= The Jungle (TV series) =

2023 Thai television series

- Official series poster
- Thai: เกมรัก นักล่า บาร์ลับ
- Genre: Romantic drama; Mystery
- Based on: "The Jungle: ป่า / ล่า / รัก" by baison
- Screenplay by: Jinatcha Maneesriwong; Pratchaya Thavornthummarut
- Directed by: Arisa Wawwanjit
- Starring: Jumpol Adulkittiporn; Thanat Lowkhunsombat; Korapat Kirdpan; Perawat Sangpotirat; Luke Ishikawa Plowden; Chayanit Charnsangarvej; Worranit Thawornwong; Sutatta Udomsilp; Lapassalan Jiravechsoontornkul; Bhasidi Petchsutee; Sarunchana Apisamaimongkol; Sahaphap Wongratch
- Opening theme: "Beast Inside"
- Composer: Supakorn Jermcharoen
- Country of origin: Thailand
- Original language: Thai
- No. of episodes: 16

Production
- Executive producers: Sataporn Panichraksapong; Darapa Choeysanguan
- Producer: Noppharnach Chaiyahwimhon
- Running time: 40 - 45 minutes
- Production companies: GMMTV; Snap25

Original release
- Network: GMM 25; Viu
- Release: July 24 – September 12, 2023

The Jungle (Thai: เกมรัก นักล่า บาร์ลับ; RTGS: Game Rak Nak La Bar Lap) is a 2023 Thai romantic drama starring Jumpol Adulkittiporn (Off), Thanat Lowkhunsombat (Lee), Korapat Kirdpan (Nanon), Perawat Sangpotirat (Krist), Luke Ishikawa Plowden and Sahaphap Wongratch (Mix) based on the novel of the same name. It aired on GMM 25 on July 24, 2023, airing Mondays and Tuesdays at 20:30 ICT and streaming on Viu at 22:30 ICT the same day.

Directed by Arisa Wawwanjit and produced by GMMTV and Snap25, it was announced at the GMMTV 2022 Borderless event held on 1 December 2021.

== Synopsis ==
In the centre of this night-life city, there is a famous place for night travellers: Rendezvous, a mysterious club hidden in a basement in a corner of Thonglor. With a secret entrance and password that changes every day, the nights are filled with temptation and lust. This is the meeting place of the six boys — The Jungle. The only rule that must be remembered is that all the stories that happened in this club are secret. Or the Hunter will take matters into his own hands.

Six boys, six girls, the threat of falling in love and a mysterious place in the middle of a big city. Will all twelve people be able to discover their own hearts?

== Cast and characters ==
=== Main ===
- Jumpol Adulkittiporn (Off) as Pine (Lion)
- Thanat Lowkhunsombat (Lee) as Phethai (Jaguar) / Wayu
- Korapat Kirdpan (Nanon) as Nanfah (Tiger) / Nannam (Viper)
- Perawat Sangpotirat (Krist) as Hack (Tarantula)
- Luke Ishikawa Plowden as Nathee (Wolf)
- Chayanit Charnsangarvej (Pat) as August (Lioness)
- Worranit Thawornwong (Mook) as Kirata (Gale / Rabbit)
- Sutatta Udomsilp (Punpun) as Pladao (Gazelle)
- Lapassalan Jiravechsoontornkul (Mild) as Nithan (Squirrel)
- Bhasidi Petchsutee (Lookjun) as Irin (Butterfly)
- Sarunchana Apisamaimongkol (Aye) as Florence (Flamingo)
- Sahaphap Wongratch (Mix) as Hunter

=== Supporting ===
- Benyapa Jeenprasom (View) as Kaewta
- Sivakorn Lertchuchot (Guy) as Kitti
- Ploynira Hiruntaveesin (Kapook) as Puinun
- Praekwan Phongskul (Bimbeam) as Ally
- Thanaboon Wanlopsirinun (Na) as Pheem
- Pat Chatburirak as Kanta
- Vichuda Pindum (Mam) as Romklao
- Pattamawan Kaomulkadee (Yui) as Phen
- Sukol Sasijulaka (Jome) as Nop
- Natchukorn Maikan (Nong) as Meth
- Piyamas Monayakol (Pu)

=== Guest ===
- Navapaibool Wutthinanon (Boss) as Pingpong (Ep. 1)
- Peerapun Chungcharoenpanich (Leo) as Nathee (young) (Ep. 9)
- Krongkwan Nakornthap (Jaoying) as Florence (young) (Ep. 9)
- Chatchawit Techarukpong (Victor) as Posh (Ep. 11)
- Phromphiriya Thongputtaruk (Papang) as Tee (Ep. 12)
- Phanuroj Chalermkijporntavee (Pepper) as Kim (Ep. 13)
- Juthapich Indrajundra (Jamie) as Emmy (Ep. 16)
- Phuwin Tangsakyuen (Ep. 16)
- Phimkhae Kunchon Na Ayutthaya as Phethai's grandmother
- Thitiwan Klatalumbon (YaiBua) as Saifa and Phayu's mother

== Original soundtrack ==
The official soundtrack for The Jungle features:

Song	Artist(s)	Label	Ref.
"Beast Inside"	Off, Lee, Nanon, Krist, and Luke	GMMTV Records	
"หากวันหนึ่ง (What If I...)"	Lee Thanat	GMMTV Records	
"แค่ปากแข็ง (Pretend)"	Nanon Korapat	GMMTV Records	
"ฉันดีกว่า (Treat You Like Angels)"	Krist Perawat	GMMTV Records	
"รักเธอจนมากพอ (Can’t Have You)"	Luke Ishikawa	GMMTV Records	
"จุดจบคนเก่ง (In The End)"	Off Jumpol	GMMTV Records	
