= Mama Gogo =

2022 Thai television series

- Official series poster
- Thai: แม่มาคุม...หนุ่มบาร์ร้อน
- Genre: Comedy drama; Sex comedy; Romance
- Screenplay by: Tichakorn Phukhaotong; Sedthawut Inboon; Kirati Kumsat; Nuttamon Yimyam; Pacharawan Chaipuwarat
- Directed by: Tichakorn Phukhaotong
- Starring: Cris Horwang; Thanat Lowkhunsombat; Paweenut Pangnakorn
- Country of origin: Thailand
- Original language: Thai
- No. of episodes: 12

Production
- Executive producers: Sataporn Panichraksapong; Darapa Choeysanguan; Noppharnach Chaiyahwimhon
- Cinematography: Rath Roongrueangtantisook; Pongthorn Thongwattana
- Running time: 60 - 65 minutes
- Production companies: GMMTV; Hard Feeling Film

Original release
- Network: GMM 25; AIS Play
- Release: June 12 – August 28, 2022

Mama Gogo (Thai: แม่มาคุม...หนุ่มบาร์ร้อน; RTGS: Mae Ma Khum... Num Bar Ron) is a 2022 Thai comedy drama series starring Cris Horwang, Thanat Lowkhunsombat (Lee) and Paweenut Pangnakorn (Pookie). It aired on GMM 25 on June 5, 2023, airing on Sundays at 20:30 ICT and streaming on AIS Play at 22:30 ICT the same day.

Directed by Tichakorn Phukhaotong and produced by GMMTV and Hard Feeling Film, it was introduced as one of GMMTV's "GMMTV 2021: The New Decade Begins" event on 3 December 2020.

== Synopsis ==
Annie (Cris Horwang), a formerly popular singer in the 90s, inherits something from her uncle. She renovates an old men's bar and go-go boy club called Papa Gogo and is on a quest to find some dancers to populate the stage. This leads to the bar becoming famous under the new name Mama Gogo, but now faces obstacles from the local mafia, led by Chen (Thanat Lowkhunsombat). Plus her former best friend-turned-rival Tina (Paweenut Pangnakorn) opens her own go-go bar to compete with Annie's newfound success. Can Mama Annie lead her boys to not only success on the stage, but to feeling comfortable in their own bodies and sexuality?

== Cast and characters ==
=== Main ===
- Cris Horwang as Annie Lee
- Thanat Lowkhunsombat (Lee) as Chen
- Paweenut Pangnakorn (Pookie) as Tina

=== Supporting ===
- Way-Ar Sangngern (Joss) as Kayu
- Pirapat Watthanasetsiri (Earth) as Kampan
- Chanunphat Kamolkiriluck (Gigie) as Kungten
- Chinnarat Siriphongchawalit (Mike) as Chok
- Sivakorn Lertchuchot (Guy) as Yut
- Suphakorn Sriphotong (Pod) as Mudaeng
- Jirakit Kuariyakul (Toptap) as Auto
- Sattabut Laedeke (Drake) as Mikhael
- Rutricha Phapakithi (Ciize) as Fifa lee
- Chanagun Arpornsutinan (Gunsmile) as Huge
- Nat Sakdatorn as Ball
- Puttachat Pongsuchat (Tuitui) as Sui

=== Guest ===
- Darina Boonchu (Nancy) as Pupae (Ep. 1)
- Patara Eksangkul (Foei) as Dome (Ep. 1, 11)
- Watthanachai Treedecha as Pramote Thamjai (Ep. 2)
- Krittaphat Chanthanaphot (Pong) as Guang (Ep. 5)
- Tipnaree Weerawatnodom (Namtan) as Kiwi (Ep. 12)

== Production ==
On May 20, 2021, it was revealed that Luke Ishikawa Plowden had swapped projects with Way-Ar Sangngern (Joss), transferring over to the series Drag, I Love You.

== Original soundtrack ==
The official soundtrack for Mama Gogo features:

Song	Artist(s)	Label	Ref.
"ว่างอยู่ (Available)"	Jan Ployshompoo and Ciize Rutricha	GMMTV Records	
