= Weerawatnodom =

Weerawatnodom is a surname. People with the surname include:

- Tipnaree Weerawatnodom
- Narubadin Weerawatnodom
