= My Dear Donovan =

2022 Thai television series

- Official series poster
- Thai: โดโนวาน...ที่รัก
- Genre: Drama; Romantic comedy
- Directed by: Sakon Wongsinwiset
- Starring: Luke Ishikawa Plowden; Tipnaree Weerawatnodom
- Country of origin: Thailand
- Original language: Thai
- No. of episodes: 16

Production
- Executive producer: Sataporn Panichraksapong
- Running time: 48 minutes
- Production companies: GMMTV; Gmo Films

Original release
- Network: GMM25; TrueID
- Release: 10 August – 29 September 2022

My Dear Donovan (Thai: โดโนวาน...ที่รัก; Donovan... Thirak, lit. Donovan... My Love) is a 2022 Thai television series starring Luke Ishikawa Plowden and Tipnaree Weerawatnodom (Namtan). Directed by Golf Sakon Wongsinwiset and produced by GMMTV together with Gmo Films, this series aired on GMM25 and TrueID from August 10, 2022 to September 29, 2022.

== Synopsis ==
Donovan (Luke Ishikawa Plowden), an American model, is looking for a woman he no longer communicates with. Later on, he meets Pam (Tipnaree Weerawatnodom), a kindergarten teacher who works as Donovan's personal manager and interpreter at Palee Modeling. She changes her job because she needs to raise money to pay for her grandfather's expensive surgery. However, she quickly becomes involved in both his professional and personal problems, and as the two grow closer, she discovers Donovan's secret.

== Cast and characters ==
=== Main ===
- Luke Ishikawa Plowden as Donovan McDaniel (Dino)
- Tipnaree Weerawatnodom (Namtan) as Pam Pemanee

=== Supporting ===
- Krissana Sreadthatamrong as Pun (Pam's grandfather)
- Piyamas Maneeyakul (Pu) as Savitree (Pam's grandmother)
- Suphakorn Sriphotong (Pod) as Aood
- Aerin Yuktadatta as Jessica
- Pakkaramai Potranan (Tong) as Da Dararai
- Chanokwanun Rakcheep (Took) as Parichat (Pam's mother)
- Nattharat Kornkaew (Champ) as Pete

=== Guest ===
- Bhasidi Petchsutee (Lookjun) as young Parichat (Ep. 1)
- Thanaset Suriyapornchaikul (Euro) as Aood's employee (Ep. 3)
