= Drag, I Love You =

2022 Thai television series

- Official series poster
- Thai: นางฟ้าคาบาเรต์
- Genre: Romantic comedy; Drama; Mystery
- Directed by: Kritsada Techanilobon
- Starring: Karnklao Duaysienklao; Luke Ishikawa Plowden
- Country of origin: Thailand
- Original language: Thai
- No. of episodes: 22

Production
- Executive producer: Sataporn Panichraksapong
- Running time: 50 minutes
- Production companies: GMMTV; Prakaifah Production

Original release
- Network: GMM25; AIS Play
- Release: 2 March – 19 May 2022

Drag, I Love You (Thai: นางฟ้าคาบาเรต์; Nang Fah Cabaret, lit. Cabaret Angel) is a 2022 Thai television series starring Karnklao Duaysienklao (Grace) and Luke Ishikawa Plowden. The series follows a police officer who goes undercover in a drag bar to solve a complicated case that threatens the lives of local celebrities.

Directed by Kritsada Techanilobon and produced by GMMTV together with Prakaifah Production, it was announced as one of the television series of GMMTV for 2021 during their "GMMTV2021: The New Decade Begins" event on December 3, 2020. The series aired on GMM25 and AIS Play from March 2, to May 19, 2022.

== Synopsis ==
The series follows the chaotic and spectacular world of "Blueberry Rama," a cabaret show that becomes the unexpected meeting ground for two individuals forced into becoming "showgirls" out of sheer necessity. Noona (Grace Karnklao), the twin sister of top showgirl Nadia, goes undercover to investigate her sister's mysterious disappearance, only to cross paths with Prabsuek (Luke Ishikawa), an eccentric police officer undercover on a secret investigation. Because both are hunting for the truth in the exact same venue, their dual missions spark absolute chaos, comedy, and an unexpected romance. In the end, their shared journey raises the question of whether their fake stage personas will blossom into a very real connection.

== Cast and characters ==
=== Main ===
- Karnklao Duaysienklao (Grace) as Noona / Nadia
- Luke Ishikawa Plowden as Prabsuek

=== Supporting ===
- Chatchawit Techarukpong (Victor) as Tanu
- Tipnaree Weerawatnodom (Namtan) as Parn
- Jai Sira as Pree
- Rhatha Phongam (Ying) as Lucy
- Sivakorn Lertchuchot (Guy) as Decha
- Jennie Panhan as Honey
- Tachakorn Boonlupyanun (Godji) as Julia
- Kittipat Chalaragse (Golf) as Tomo
- Aanan Boonnak as Tanya
- Kohtee Aramboy as Bambi
- Thanapat Sornkoon (Peii) as Panpan
- Thongchai Thongkanthom (Pingpong) as Platoo

=== Guest ===
- Niti Chaichitathorn (Pompam) as Fai (Ep. 2, 6, 12)
- Jiratchai Chayuti (Techin) as Ting Li (Ep. 9, 11, 17–18, 21)
- Pittaya Na Ranong (Bird) as Lucas (Ep. 12, 15, 17)

== Production ==
On May 20, 2021, it was revealed that Way-Ar Sangngern (Joss) had swapped projects with Luke Ishikawa Plowden, transferring over to the series Mama Gogo.
