= GMMTV =

Thai television production company

- Native name: จีเอ็มเอ็มทีวี
- Formerly: Grammy Television
- Type: Limited
- Industry: Artist management agency; Television production; Filmmaking
- Founded: 3 August 1995 (31 years ago)
- Headquarters: GMM Grammy Place, 50 Sukhumvit Road, Khlong Toei Nuea, Watthana, Bangkok, Thailand
- Key people: Sataporn Panichraksapong
- Revenue: ▲2,401.26 million baht (2023)
- Net income: ▼220.96 million baht (2023)
- Parent: GMM Grammy (1995–2020); The One Enterprise (2020–present)
- Website: gmm-tv.com

GMMTV (Thai: จีเอ็มเอ็มทีวี) is a television production and talent agent subsidiary to the Thai entertainment conglomerate GMM Grammy, under The One Enterprise, which produces television shows, songs, and music videos. It was founded on August 3, 1995. Sataporn Panichraksapong is the company's chief executive officer.

== History ==
Logos

It was first known as Grammy Television (which refers to its acronym from the latter)

First logo used from 2007 to 2013

Current logo since 2014

GMMTV Company Limited (Thai: บริษัท จีเอ็มเอ็มทีวี จำกัด) (also known as Grammy Television Company Limited Thai: บริษัท แกรมมี่ เทเลวิชั่น จำกัด) was founded on August 3, 1995 by the GMM Grammy executives who saw the potential in developing, growing and strengthening the Thai television industry. The marketing department of the company was created into a separate entity to manage the television production industry. GMMTV started to produce TV game shows and music shows for analogue TV stations in Thailand at that time, namely, Channel 3, Channel 5, Channel 7, and iTV, with Duangjai Lorlertwit and Saithip Montrikul na Ayudhaya as the managing directors, respectively.

In 2007, Saithip Montrikul na Ayudhaya left the company to manage GMM Media Public Co., Ltd. As a result, Sataporn Panichraksapong, who was then the deputy managing director, became the new managing director (chief executive officer at present) and renamed the company into GMMTV Company Limited.

On February 2, 2009, the company started running a cable and satellite television channel named Bang Channel by moving some of the TV shows which were aired on Channel 5 to its own channel, and began to produce different television programs in other genres aside from game shows and music shows. On June 29, 2011, GMMTV had set up a joint venture with Rungtham Pumseenil to establish Memiti Co., Ltd. to expand and innovate the Thai television industry with 70% of shares held by GMMTV, and 30% held by Rungtham. Consequently, Memiti became a subsidiary of GMMTV.

Due to the business restructuring of GMM Grammy, on June 24, 2015, GMM Grammy's board of directors has passed the resolution to dispose of the total 70% shares held by GMMTV in Memiti to The One Enterprise or One 31 channel business group as a new shareholder affecting Memiti to become a subsidiary of The One Enterprise accordingly. On December 5 the same year, GMMTV's board of directors resolved to close its cable and satellite television channel and instead focus on television production for One31 and GMM 25 which are digital channels. As a result, Bang Channel stopped broadcasting from December 31, 2015, onwards.

On August 24, 2017, after Adelfos Co., Ltd, a subsidiary of TCC Group has subscribed for the newly issued ordinary shares in GMM Channel Trading Co., Ltd., GMM Grammy has restructured its business to be in line with the share subscription agreement by passing a resolution to transfer all of its shares held in GMMTV to GMMCH (GMM Channel Holding Co., Ltd., formerly GMM Channel Trading Co., Ltd.) or the business group of GMM 25 as the new shareholder.

However, on November 27, 2020, the board of directors’ meeting of GMM Grammy, in company with Siridamrongdham Co., Ltd. of TCC Group, had the resolution to dispose of and transfer all of their shares in GMMCH to ONEE (The One Enterprise Public Company Limited or One31 business group) in accordance with the conditions and plans in relation to an initial public offering and list ONEE in the Stock Exchange of Thailand. As a result, the company has been a subsidiary of The One Enterprise group with Takonkiet Viravan as the indirect director since December 1.

On October 20, 2022, GMMTV set up a joint venture with Benetone Films Co., Ltd. to produce and distribute the film Congrats My Ex! and holds a 25% stake or 10,500,000 baht of the total investment.

On November 22, 2022, during the GMMTV 2023 Diversely Yours, press conference, Sataporn announced plans to invest a 51% stake in Parbdee Tawesuk Co., Ltd., the creative production house which co-produced Wake Up Ladies: The Series, The Gifted, F4 Thailand: Boys Over Flowers, etc. in an effort to grow GMMTV's business model and enhance potential and elevate Thai content to reach new heights in the global market. The acquisition was completed a month later on December 22, 2022.

On November 26, 2025, during the GMMTV 2026 Magic Vibes Maximized, press conference, Sataporn revealed new plans for newly acquired and pending subsidiares of GMMTV. The 100% stake into Gemmistry Studio Co., Ltd. the creative production house which co-produced Me and Thee, Peach and Me, Ticket to Heaven, etc. with the objective of producing a greater volume of television dramas, series, variety shows and news shows at a higher quality. The 51% stake acquisition of NewbbeventCo., Ltd. on January 5, 2026, formed Gemmistry Soul Co., Ltd., the subsidiary responsible for managing the representative Mascots of fan communities of each GMMTV artist, with the intent of increasing the Group's revenue from artist management. The October 30, 2025, acquisition of Gemmistry Flow D Co., Ltd. as a subsidiary with a 100% stake was made with the intent to operate an academy of dance, singing, music, and to provide training services and courses in vocal performance, dancing and choreography.

On May 11, 2026, The One Enterprise resolved to approve the establishment of Studio Wabi Sabi Co., Ltd., the creative production house which co-produced A Boss and a Babe, Perfect 10 Liners, Revamp The Undead Story, etc. as an indirect subsidiary to GMMTV, focusing on content production and development, and integrated artist management. The acquisition was completed on September 14, 2026, with GMMTV holding a 51% stake.

Currently, GMMTV is producing entertainment programs, dramas, and television series, including boys' love and girls' love series, under the supervision and management of The One Enterprise, which has the right to organize both One31 and GMM 25 channels. The One Enterprise granted the prime time 8:30–9:30 pm timeslot on GMM 25 to GMMTV to broadcast their series.

== Artists ==
=== Current ===
These are the current artists under the talent arm of GMMTV including TV presenters/hosts, actors and singers:

1. Allan Asawasuebsakul (Ford)
2. Anthony Buisseret (Anthony)
3. Archen Aydin (Joong)
4. Atthaphan Phunsawat (Gun)
5. Benyapa Jeenprasom (View)
6. Bhobdhama Hansa (Java)
7. Chanikarn Tangkabodee (Prim)
8. Chanitsiri Ratananimit (Waifha)
9. Charisar Oldham (Chari)
10. Chayada Akiyama (Mook)
11. Chayakorn Jutamas (JJ)
12. Chayapol Jutamas (AJ)
13. Chayatorn Trairattanapradit (Tui)
14. Chayuth Gorsurat (Titan)
15. Chompoopuntip Temtanamongkol (Acare)
16. Dechchart Tasilp (Sea)
17. Gawin Caskey (Gawin)
18. Harit Cheewagaroon (Sing)
19. Hirunkit Changkham (Nani)
20. Ing Asavanund (Ing)
21. Itchayada Vibhupipat (Earn)
22. Jackrin Kungwankiatichai (Jackie)
23. Jakrapatr Kaewpanpong (William)
24. Jeeratch Wongpian (Fluke)
25. Jiratchapong Srisang (Force)
26. Jirawat Sutivanichsak (Dew)
27. Jiruntanin Trairattanayon (Mark)
28. Jitaraphol Potiwihok (Jimmy)
29. Jittanan Sirisamrit (Benz)
30. Jumpol Adulkittiporn (Off)
31. Juthapich Indrajundra (Jamie)
32. Kanaphan Puitrakul (First)
33. Kanthee Limpitikranon (Ken)
34. Kanyarat Ruangrung (Piploy)
35. Kasidet Plookphol (Book)
36. Kay Lertsittichai (Kay)
37. Kirati Puangmalee (Title)
38. Kittipat Chalaragse (Golf)
39. Kittiphop Sereevichayasawat (Satang)
40. Korapat Kirdpan (Nanon)
41. Kridchayaan Attavipach (Prom)
42. Krittanun Aunchananun (Ping)
43. Krongkwan Nakornthap (Jaoying)
44. Lapat Ngamchaweng (Third)
45. Leo Saussay (Leo)
46. Matas Bayseng (Geno)
47. Metas Opas-iamkajorn (Mick)
48. Metawin Opas-iamkajorn (Win)
49. Nachat Juntapun (Nicky)
50. Nachcha Chuedang (Parn)
51. Nalada Bejrajati (Lana)
52. Namassakarn Trangkhasombat (Lighty)
53. Nannaphas Loetnamchoetsakun (Mewnich)
54. Napapat Sattha-atikom (Chelsea)
55. Napat Patcharachavalit (Aun)
56. Naravit Lertratkosum (Pond)
57. Naruth Prateeppavameta (Franc)
58. Natachai Boonprasert (Dunk)
59. Natarit Worakornlertsith (Marc)
60. Nattanon Tongsaeng (Fluke)
61. Nattapat Nimjirawat (Mac)
62. Nattawat Jirochtikul (Fourth)
63. Natthawat Burathanawat (NJ)
64. Natticha Chantaravareelekha (Fond)
65. Nichapa Praepeerakul (Mymé)
66. Nippitcha Pipitdaecha (Paeyah)
67. Niti Chaichitathorn (Pompam)
68. Nonthakarn Kaewobchoey (Tonkhaw)
69. Noppanut Guntachai (Boun)
70. Norawit Titicharoenrak (Gemini)
71. Nutnicha Sangmanee (Pream)
72. Nuttanicha Dungwattanawanich (Nycha)
73. Ochiris Suwanacheep (Aungpao)
74. Pakin Kunaanuwit (Mark)
75. Panachai Sriariyarungruang (Junior)
76. Panachkorn Rueksiriaree (Stamp)
77. Pansa Vosbein (Milk)
78. Passawish Thamasungkeeti (Progress)
79. Patchara Silapasoonthorn (Surf)
80. Pathitta Pornchumroenrut (Pahn)
81. Patsit Permpoonsavat (Soodyacht)
82. Pattariyakorn Luangkungwankij (Mata)
83. Pattranite Limpatiyakorn (Love)
84. Pattraphus Borattasuwan (Bonnie)
85. Pawat Chittsawangdee (Ohm)
86. Peemsan Sotangkur (Luke)
87. Peerakan Teawsuwan (Ashi)
88. Perawat Sangpotirat (Krist)
89. Phakawat Tangchatkeaw (Tor)
90. Phatchatorn Thanawat (Ployphach)
91. Pheerawit Koolkang (Captain)
92. Phichayada Chonpaipimolrut (Pang)
93. Phromphiriya Thongputtaruk (Papang)
94. Phudtripart Bhudthonamochai (Ryu)
95. Phuwin Tangsakyuen (Phuwin)
96. Pichetpong Chiradatesakunvong (Hong)
97. Pirapat Watthanasetsiri (Earth)
98. Ploynira Hiruntaveesin (Kapook)
99. Ployshompoo Supasap (Jan)
100. Pongsapak Udompoch (Santa)
101. Poomsuwan Suwansatit (Almond)
102. Poon Mitpakdee (Poon)
103. Poon Sutarom (Pun)
104. Prachaya Ruangroj (Singto)
105. Prariyapit Yu (JingJing)
106. Puttipong Jitbut (Chokun)
107. Rachanun Mahawan (Film)
108. Rapeepong Supatineekitdecha (Lego)
109. Rapheephong Thapsuwan (Bright)
110. Ratapirom Bandapraneat (Michiru)
111. Ratiphat Luengvoraphan (Aston)
112. Rattanawadee Wongthong (Mim)
113. Rutricha Phapakithi (Ciize)
114. Sabsima Payakharn (Pang)
115. Sahaphap Wongratch (Mix)
116. Samantha Melanie Coates (Sammy)
117. Sapol Assawamunkong (Great)
118. Sarin Ronnakiat (Inn)
119. Save Saisawat (Save)
120. Sillapintr Sillapachai (Sangt)
121. Singha Luangsuntorn (Singha)
122. Sitthithat Tungtisanon (Keaton)
123. Srisirin Vichayasut (Artist)
124. Supakorn Kantanit (Guitar)
125. Supha Sangaworawong (Est)
126. Suphakorn Sriphotong (Pod)
127. Suvijak Piyanopharoj (Keen)
128. Taas Tanyongmas (Taas)
129. Tachakorn Boonlupyanun (Godji)
130. Tanan Lohawatanakul (Paul)
131. Tanapon Sukumpantanasan (Perth)
132. Tanutchai Wijitvongtong (Mond)
133. Tarnpol Pongnarisorn (Tata)
134. Tawan Vihokratana (Tay)
135. Tawinan Anukoolprasert (Sea)
136. Teepakron Kwanboon (Prom)
137. Teeradech Vitheepanich (Tee)
138. Teshow Promsakha Na Sakonnakhon (Teshow)
139. Thamonchita Narmkool (Mantra)
140. Thanaboon Kiatniran (Aou)
141. Thanachai Sakchaicharoenkul (Kin)
142. Thanat Danjesda (Nut)
143. Thanathat Tanjararak (Indy)
144. Thanawat Rattanakitpaisan (Khaotung)
145. Thanawat Suppakijjanusorn (Fu)
146. Thanawin Pholcharoenrat (Winny)
147. Thanawin Teeraphosukarn (Louis)
148. Thanchanok Tinsulanonda (Maitai)
149. Thasorn Klinnium (Emi)
150. Thinnaphan Tantui (Thor)
151. Thipakorn Thitathan (Ohm)
152. Thishar Thurachon (Mint)
153. Thitipoom Techaapaikhun (New)
154. Thitiwat Ritprasert (Ohm)
155. Tinnasit Isarapongporn (Barcode)
156. Tipnaree Weerawatnodom (Namtan)
157. Tiranat Kittisattho (Juno)
158. Tontawan Tantivejakul (Tu)
159. Trai Nimtawat (Neo)
160. Tupthong Suwanrakanont (Tham)
161. Tytan Teepprasan (Tytan)
162. Ukrit Rattanasuk (Krit)
163. Wachirawit Ruangwiwat (Chimon)
164. Wanwimol Jaenasavamethee (June)
165. Warut Chawalitrujiwong (Prem)
166. Watchara Sukchum (Jennie Panhan)
167. Wattanin Songtaweesub (Khaokla)
168. Way-Ar Sangngern (Joss)
169. Weerayut Chansook (Arm)
170. Wongravee Nateetorn (Sky)
171. Yosita Wasuphiruk (Yoghurt)

=== Former ===
1. Achirawich Saliwattana (Gun Achi)
2. Akeburud Sophon (Suice)
3. Akkaranat Ariyaritwikul (Nott)
4. Alysaya Tsoi (Alice)
5. Bhasidi Petchsutee (Lookjun)
6. Chanagun Arpornsutinan (Gunsmile)
7. Chanunphat Kamolkiriluck (Gigie)
8. Charada Imraporn (Piglet)
9. Chatchawit Techarukpong (Victor)
10. Chinnarat Siriphongchawalit (Mike)
11. Jirakit Kuariyakul (Toptap)
12. Jirakit Thawornwong (Mek)
13. Justin Angus Moir (Justin)
14. Juti Jumroenketpratip (Mek)
15. Kasempong Paladesh (Bezt)
16. Khemarat Sunthorranon (Oung)
17. Khoo Pei-Cong (Wave)
18. Kitkasem McFadden (James)
19. Korawit Boonsri (Gun)
20. Korn Khunatipapisiri (Oaujun)
21. Kritchanok Suaysod (Atom)
22. Krithawat Akachai (Non)
23. Krittanai Arsalprakit (Nammon)
24. Krittaphorn Monteerarat (Mook)
25. Kunchanuj Kengkarnka (Kun)
26. Luke Ishikawa Plowden (Luke)
27. Marie Eugenie Le Lay (Zom)
28. Maripha Siripool (Wawa)
29. Methavee Pichetchaiyuth (Now)
30. Napasasi Surawan (Mind)
31. Napasorn Weerayuttvilai (Puimek)
32. Nararak Jaibumrung (Ten)
33. Natcha Janthapan (Mouse)
34. Natkritta Vongruangvisal (Aim)
35. Nattawat Finkler (Patrick)
36. Nattharat Kornkaew (Champ)
37. Nawat Phumphotingam (White)
38. Neen Suwanamas (Neen)
39. Nicharut Sakkasemrut (Ning)
40. Noelle Klinneam (Tiny)
41. Ornalin Leelaburanathanakul (Gene)
42. Oranicha Krinchai (Proud)
43. Patara Eksangkul (Foei)
44. Patchata Janngeon (Fiat)
45. Pathompong Reonchaidee (Toy)
46. Peerapon Senakun (Ikkyu)
47. Perawit Pinta (Palm)
48. Phakjira Kanrattanasood (Nanan)
49. Phanuroj Chalermkijporntavee (Pepper)
50. Phurikulkrit Chusakdiskulwibul (Amp)
51. Pimlada Chaiprichawit (Prae)
52. Pisith Nimitsamanjit (Fluk)
53. Pluem Pongpisal (Pluem)
54. Porntip Pantawong (Ploy)
55. Praekwan Phongskul (Bimbeam)
56. Premanat Suwannannon (Peck)
57. Pronpiphat Pattanasettanon (Plustor)
58. Pumipat Paiboon (Prame)
59. Purim Rattanaruangwattana (Pluem)
60. Pusit Dittapisit (Fluke)
61. Puttichai Kasetsin (Push)
62. Ramida Jiranorraphat (Jane)
63. Rapa Surajaras (Rapa)
64. Sarunchana Apisamaimongkol (Aye)
65. Sarunyu Winaipanit (Ice)
66. Sattabut Laedeke (Drake)
67. Sean Jindachot (Sean)
68. Sheranut Yusananda (Namcha)
69. Sirichok Sae-Tang (Ball)
70. Sirintip Hanpradit (Rose)
71. Sivakorn Lertchuchot (Guy)
72. Smith Sirisrimungkorn (Bank)
73. Sureeyares Yakares (Prigkhing)
74. Sutthipha Kongnawdee (Noon)
75. Thanaboon Wanlopsirinun (Na)
76. Thanakorn Phowijit (Float)
77. Thanaphon U-sinsap (Leng)
78. Thanaset Suriyapornchaikul (Euro)
79. Thanat Lowkhunsombat (Lee)
80. Thanatsaran Samthonglai (Frank)
81. Thanik Kamontharanon (Pawin)
82. Thapat Niyommalai (Tee)
83. Tharatorn Jantharaworakarn (Boom)
84. Theeratach Sriboonnark (Bond)
85. Vachirawit Chivaaree (Bright)
86. Warinda Damrongphol (Dada)
87. Winyu Wongsurawat (John)
88. Worranit Thawornwong (Mook)
89. Yongwaree Anilbol (Fah)

== Television and online ==
=== TV shows ===
Aside from its dramas and boys' love/girls' love series airing on primetime every 20:30 ICT slot on GMM25, GMMTV also produced variety shows that air on GMM25 and ONE31. Every show's full episode catch-up is available via GMMTV's YouTube channels as well as other social media platforms and partner streaming services.

=== Online shows ===
GMMTV is also releasing exclusive online shows through their YouTube channels; including TikTok and Facebook, as well as other social media platforms and partner streaming services.

On GMMTV Official (YouTube)

- GMMTV Live House with (alternatively hosting) Off Jumpol, Tay Tawan, Jan Ployshompoo, Junior Panachai, Sing Harit, Mark Pakin, Neo Trai, Winny Thanawin and Pahn Pathitta – Tuesdays and Thursdays (since September 4, 2023) (9:30 pm ICT)
- Arm Share with Arm Weerayut – alternate Wednesdays (since April 16, 2019) (6:00 pm ICT)
- Based on 2 Stories – monthly when two TV series are airing within the same timeframe (since August 15, 2025) (6:00 pm ICT)
- The Trio Invites You to Eat by Pepsi Mitrchuankin with Junior Panachai, Jan Ployshompoo and Book Kasidet – Last Friday of every month (since June 26, 2026) (6:00 pm ICT)
- Stay Awake "Almost Out... But Still Up" by Birdy with Force Jiratchapong, Jimmy Jitaraphol and Junior Panachai – alternate Thursdays (since July 2, 2026) (6:00 pm ICT)
- Garnier Witty Academy Field Trip with Leo Saussay and Godji Tachakorn – alternate Tuesdays (since August 18, 2026) (6:00 pm ICT) (Note: new iteration of Garnier Witty Academy)
- Max Vote Road Trip (Season 2) with Win Metawin, Off Jumpol, Jackie Jackrin and Nicky Nachat — Sundays (since September 20, 2026) (3:00 pm ICT)
- Idol Energy (Season 2) — with LYKN, JASP.ER and PERSES — Sundays (since October 4, 2026) (6:00 pm ICT)

On GMMTV Official (TikTok)

- GMMTV Giggle Gang with GMMTV's mascots — Saturdays (since October 5, 2025) (9:30 pm ICT)

On GMMTV Official (Facebook)

- CLUB FUN DEE with Dentist Tu with Tu Tontawan – Saturdays (since October 3, 2026) (9:00 am ICT)
Defunct (Note: Some defunct shows may still be returning for special episodes.)
- Chuan Len Challenge (April 1, 2016 – March 20, 2022)
- Manud Pa La Dek (July 25, 2016 – August 27, 2020)
- Off Gun Fun Night (November 12, 2017 – July 12, 2018)
- Friend.ship with Krist-Singto (July 15, 2019 – December 15, 2019)
- Off Gun Fun Night (Season 2) (July 24, 2019 – December 24, 2019)
- TayNew Meal Date (November 30, 2018 – December 26, 2019)
- Jen Jud God Jig (August 19, 2019 – March 27, 2020)
- Be My Baby (November 26, 2019 – March 31, 2020)
- Mu Jong Pung (April 10, 2019 – July 3, 2020)
- Love White Love Animal (March 5, 2020 – April 2, 2020)
- Sanae Hong Krueng (April 24, 2019 – April 20, 2020)
- Come & Joy Gun (January 30, 2020 – June 4, 2020)
- Play2gether (May 25, 2020 – June 15, 2020)
- Hungry Sister (February 25, 2020 – July 21, 2020)
- Jen Jud God Jig Up Level (July 30, 2020 – September 30, 2020)
- Game Nong Kong Phi (November 5, 2020 – November 19, 2020)
- Bright - Win Inbox (June 30, 2020 – November 24, 2020)
- Topak Tokham Titfaidaeng (Season 4) (June 26, 2020 – December 18, 2020)
- Kuad Wicha (November 9, 2020 – January 18, 2021)
- OffGun Mommy Taste (August 6, 2020 – March 4, 2021)
- Hub Talk (February 1, 2020 – March 15, 2021)
- Play Lift (March 29, 2021 – April 12, 2021)
- Nicky Kii Tuen (April 9, 2021)
- Isuzu Max Challenge (May 27, 2021 – July 1, 2021)
- Safe House Season 1 (September 13 – 19, 2021)
- Safe House Season 2: Winter Camp (November 15 – 21, 2021)
- Hub! Hub (September 25, 2021 – November 13, 2021)
- Safe House Season 3: Best Bro Secret (March 21 – 27, 2022)
- Let’s play Lay’s 24 Hrs. (March 29, 2022 – April 12, 2022)
- Force - Book Show Real (February 17, 2022 – April 21, 2022)
- Krahai Lao (April 20, 2021 — July 12, 2022)
- Young Survivors (May 18, 2022 – July 13, 2022)
- E.M.S: Earth-Mix Space (September 10, 2021 – July 29, 2022)
- Ohm Nanon Upvel (March 28, 2022 – August 22, 2022)
- Safe House Season 4: Vote Live (September 5 – 11, 2022)
- Lay's On Cruise (August 30, 2022 – September 13, 2022)
- Hub A Nice Day (August 15, 2022 – September 26, 2022)
- Raeng Long (July 13, 2022 – November 30, 2022)
- BMC Way (August 28, 2022 – December 26, 2022)
- Isuzu Magic Eyes Challenge (December 4, 2022 – December 25, 2022)
- Little Big World With Pond Phuwin (August 26, 2022 – January 27, 2023)
- Chuat Chuat (August 11, 2022 – February 2, 2023)
- Once Upon A Time with Tay Tawan (September 12, 2022 – April 3, 2023)
- E.M.S: Earth-Mix Space (Season 2) (January 17, 2023 – June 30, 2023)
- Alpha Roommate (April 1 – 23, 2023)
- ALPHA X (March 22, 2023 – May 3, 2023)
- Lay's Very Thai Very Toey (February 23, 2023 – May 11, 2023)
- LYKN Late Night Live (formerly named Alpha Live Room) – (March 16, 2023 – May 11, 2023)
- Fancam For Fan – (May 2, 2023)
- All Area Ticket – (May 9, 2023)
- Rang Zong Gamer – (May 16, 2023)
- Kaeng Puea – (May 30, 2023)
- Len Mun – (June 8, 2023)
- Cheer Reader (July 21, 2022 – August 16, 2023)
- Lun Aroi Free Pepsi Kho Liang Dai Pa – (July 21, 2023 – September 15, 2023)
- LANEIGE Let It Go (Season 1) – (October 14, 2023 – November 4, 2023)
- Mission Tum Duay Jai Moment Nai Mai Wai Bok Brand – (July 10, 2023 – November 13, 2023)
- Saeb Save Saen (Season 1) – (December 2–16, 2023)
- Hidden Hangout – (October 31, 2023 – April 2, 2024)
- Fully Booked – (March 18, 2024 – April 22, 2024)
- Rot Song Taew (July 20, 2022 – May 15, 2024) (became a part of Freeform section of Talk-with-ToeyS
- High Season (Season 1) – (April 25, 2024 – June 6, 2024)
- LANEIGE Let It Go (Season 2) – (July 20, 2024 – September 14, 2024)
- High Season (Season 2) – (September 14, 2024 – October 5, 2024)
- Sip Sense Challenge – (September 17, 2024 – October 15, 2024)
- BRAND’S Brain Camp – alternate Wednesdays (June 13, 2024 – December 25, 2024)
- Pepsi Mitrchuankin Guide with Gemini - Fourth (Note: new iteration of Lun Aroi Free Pepsi Kho Liang Dai Pa) Season 1 – (April 5, 2024 – December 27, 2024)
- Peak Trip with Win Mick – (August 6, 2024 – February 3, 2025)
- Bestie Tasty (Season 1) – (January 7, 2025 – February 4, 2025)
- High Season (Season 3) – (January 18, 2025 – March 8, 2025)
- The Unexpected Trip by NIVEA – (February 18, 2025 – March 18, 2025)
- Pepsi Mitrchuankin Guide with Gemini - Fourth (Season 2) (February 28, 2025 – January 30, 2026)
- FriendEd101 – (March 6, 2025 – June 12, 2025)
- JaturaMeet – (July 10, 2025 – August 21, 2025)
- Bestie Tasty (Season 2) – (May 13, 2025 – August 5, 2025)
- GARNIER Witty Academy (July 16, 2025 – August 13, 2025)
- Saeb Save Saen (Season 2) – (August 4, 2025 – September 1, 2025)
- High Season (Season 4) – (August 17, 2025 – October 5, 2025)
- Max Vote Road Trip (Season 1) — (August 24, 2025 — September 7, 2025)
- Idol Energy (Season 1) — (December 12, 2025 — December 29, 2025)
- Bestie Tasty (Season 3) – (January 13, 2026 – March 10, 2026)
- Trend to Golden Figure — (March 22, 2026 – September 7, 2026)
- CLOUD DREAM Project – (May 21, 2026 – July 9, 2026)

=== Special shows ===
Special show is a documentary program presenting GMMTV's drama, television series and other projects, including cast and crew interviews, behind-the-scenes, and footage from the production. It normally airs a week before the first episode or after the last episode on GMM25 and GMMTV's official YouTube channel.

Year	Title	(Thailand) Thai title	Presenting	Release date
2021	Sweet Day Tour	บุกครัว Baker Boys	Baker Boys	November 20, 2021
2021	F4 Thailand Begins	เปิดหัวใจรักสี่ดวงดาว	F4 Thailand: Boys Over Flowers	December 11, 2021
2022	Behind the Scenes of Devil Sister	เปิดเบื้องหลัง แอ๊บร้ายให้นายไม่รัก	Devil Sister	May 25, 2022
2022	Before Astrophile	ก่อนจะถึง... คืนนับดาว	Astrophile	May 26, 2022
2022	Mama Gogo's Bar Tour	บุกบาร์ Mama Gogo	Mama Gogo	June 5, 2022
2022	Inside Vice Versa	ก่อนจะ...รักสลับโลก	Vice Versa	July 9, 2022
2022	Good Old Days Soft Opening	เปิดร้านซื้อขายความทรงจำ	Good Old Days	August 4, 2022
2022	The Eclipse Special	คาธ ตอน เรื่องที่(คาธ)ไม่ถึง	The Eclipse	August 5, 2022
2022	Open House Open Heart	—N/a	My School President	November 25, 2022
2022	10 Years Ticket Exclusive	—N/a	10 Years Ticket	December 13, 2022 (YouTube)
2022	Never Let Me Go Exclusive	—N/a	Never Let Me Go	December 28, 2022 (YouTube)
2022	Midnight Series Special	—N/a	Midnight Series: Midnight Motel; Dirty Laundry; Moonlight Chicken	December 30, 2022 (YouTube); February 21, 2022 (GMM 25)
2023	A Boss and a Babe Special	ชอกะเชร์คู่กันต์ Special	A Boss and a Babe	March 9, 2023 (YouTube)
2023	LYKN - Day 1 to Debut	—N/a	LYKN	May 2, 2023 (YouTube); June 22, 2023 (GMM25)
2023	—N/a	โคตรเหงา เรา2คน Special	Loneliness Society	May 30, 2023
2023	Home School Series Special	เปิดรั้ว Home School นักเรียนต้องขัง	Home School	June 22, 2023
2023	Be My Favorite Stories	บทกวีของปีแสง Be My Favorite Stories	Be My Favorite	July 1, 2023
2023	Hidden Agenda Special EP	วาระพิเศษ	Hidden Agenda	July 2, 2023
2023	Enigma Special	คน มนตร์ เวท Special	Enigma	July 8, 2023
2023	Before Last Twilight	—N/a	Last Twilight	November 8, 2023 (YouTube)
2023	—N/a	เปิดครัว Cooking Crush อาหารเป็นยังไงครับหมอ	Cooking Crush	November 19, 2023
2024	23.5 Special	เมื่อโลกเริ่มเอียง 23.5 องศา	23.5	March 1, 2024
2024	—N/a	บุกที่กอง แค่ที่แกง Only Boo!	Only Boo!	March 24, 2024
2024	We Are The Beginning	ก่อนเรารักกัน	We Are	March 27, 2024
2024	Wandee Day	วันดีวิทยา Wandee Day	Wandee Goodday	April 27. 2024
2024	My Love Mix-Up! First Time Writing	เริ่มเขียนด้วยรัก	My Love Mix-Up!	May 31, 2024
2024	Kidnap Special	เปิดปมลับ-จ้าง-รัก	Kidnap	August 30, 2024
2024	Pluto Special	นิทาน ดวงดาว ความรัก Special	Pluto	October 12, 2024 (YouTube)
2024	Perfect 10 Liners Special	สายรหัสเทวดา Special	Perfect 10 Liners	October 22, 2024 (YouTube)
2024	Intro to Thame-Po Heart That Skips a Beat	—N/a	ThamePo Heart That Skips a Beat	December 6, 2024
2025	The Story of Us	รักของเรา	Us	January 11, 2025
2025	My Golden Blood Special	เปิดเบื้องหลัง เลือดนายลมหายใจฉัน	My Golden Blood	March 5, 2025
2025	Sweet Tooth, Good Dentist Special	แฟนที่ทันตแพทย์ส่วนใหญ่แนะนำ Special	Sweet Tooth, Good Dentist	March 14, 2025
2025	Before I Love 'A Lot Of' You	ก่อนจะรักมากเธอ	I Love 'A Lot Of' You	May 10, 2025
2025	The Ex-Morning Special	เพราะแฟนเก่าเปลี่ยนแปลงบ่อย Special	The Ex-Morning	May 15, 2025
2025	Memoir Of Rati Special	เปิดบันทึก จาฤกรติชา	Memoir of Rati	June 13, 2025
2025	Whale Store xoxo Special	เคุณวาฬร้านชำ Special เปิดร้านวันแรก	Whale Store xoxo	June 18, 2025
2025	Boys in love Graduation	เปิดเทอมใหม่ หัวใจหัดรัก Boys in love Graduation	Boys in Love	July 13, 2025
2025	My Magic Prophecy Special	ทำนายทายทัพ เปิดไพ่ใบที่หนึ่ง	My Magic Prophecy	July 20, 2025
2025	Revamp the Undead Story Special	—N/a	Revamp The Undead Story	August 16, 2025
2025	The Dark Dice: First Roll	เกมทอยทะลุมิติ First Roll	The Dark Dice	September 3, 2025
2025	Before That Summer	ก่อนเจอเจ้าชายบนชายหาด	That Summer	September 12, 2025
2025	Head 2 Head Special	ไหนใครว่าพวกมันไม่ถูกกัน รายการพิเศษ	Head 2 Head	October 19, 2025
2025	Friendshit Forever Special	เพื่อนสนิท พิษสหาย Special	Friendshit Forever	October 28, 2025
2025	Me and Thee Special	มีสติหน่อยคุณธีร์ Special	Me and Thee	November 8, 2025
2025	Burnout Syndrome Special	รายการพิเศษ ภาวะรักคนหมดไฟ	Burnout Syndrome	November 19, 2025
2025	The First Melody of Secrets	ความลับในบทเพลงที่บรรเลงไม่รู้จบ The First Melody of Secrets	Melody of Secrets	November 28, 2025
2025	Dare You to Death Special: File Unlocked	เปิดแฟ้ม ไขคดีเป็น เห็นคดีตาย	Dare You to Death	December 4, 2025
2026	Cat for Cash Special	เปิดคาเฟ่ เปย์รักด้วยแมวเลี้ยง	Cat for Cash	January 13, 2026
2026	My Romance Scammer Special	รายการพิเศษ รักจริง หลังแต่ง	My Romance Scammer	January 25, 2026
2026	Only Friends: Dream On Special	—N/a	Only Friends: Dream On	February 20, 2026
2026	Girl Rules Special	กฎหลัก...ห้ามรักเธอ Special	Girl Rules	March 2, 2026
2026	Love You Teacher Special	รักครูเท่าโลกเลย Special	Love You Teacher	March 7, 2026
2026	Enemies with Benefits Special	ลัลล์ไม่ชอบไวน์ Special	Enemies with Benefits	April 26, 2026
2026	Wu Special	อู Special	Wu	April 28, 2026
2026	When Oranges Fall Special	ต้นส้มอยู่บ้านเขา แต่ผลส้มหล่นมาบ้านเราตลอดเลย Special	When Oranges Fall	May 6, 2026
2026	A Dog and a Plane: Boarding Time	หมาเห่าเครื่องบิน A Dog and a Plane : Boarding Time	A Dog and a Plane	May 22, 2026
2026	Ticket to Heaven Special: The Making of Heaven	เด็กชายไม่ไปสวรรค์ Special : The Making of Heaven	Ticket to Heaven	May 23, 2026
2026	Mr. Kill Special	มังงะสั่งตาย Special	Mr. Kill	June 30, 2026
2026	Moonshadow Special	เงาใต้พระจันทร์ Special	Moonshadow	August 5, 2026
2026	Weirdo-101 Special	แรงโน้มถ่วงระหว่างเรา Special	Weirdo-101	August 7, 2026
2026	Making of Scarlet Heart Ullavee: A Miracle Through Time	เบื้องหลังกว่าจะมาเป็น: ปาฏิหาริย์ข้ามกาลเวลา	Scarlet Heart Ullavee	October 29, 2026

== Discography ==
GMMTV has been producing original soundtracks and covers under the label GMMTV Records. The vocalist(s) of a song may be either an artist under GMMTV or any subsidiary of GMM Grammy conglomerate.

GMMTV revealed its brand new record label Riser Music on January 20, 2023, consisting Perawat Sangpotirat (Krist), Vachirawit Chivaaree (Bright), and Korapat Kirdpan (Nanon) as the initial artist roster. Later, on April 5, 2023, GMMTV held the press conference and showcase to officially launch the record label in Get Rising To Riser, along with the presentation of its label manager, Kangsomks (Tanatat Chaiyaat) and the two new groups of artists, namely LYKN, a boy group of winners from Project Alpha and SIZZY, a girl group who was previously under GMMTV Records.

=== Albums ===
Boys Don't Cry – released: April 1, 2021
1. "Missing" (ขอโทษที่ยังร้องไห้) by Krist Perawat
2. "Why?" by Lee Thanat
3. "Lonely Mode" (เหงาเป็น) by Joss Way-ar
4. "Unmovable" (ไปไหน) by Bright Vachirawit
5. "My Universe Is You" (จักรวาลที่ฉันต้องการมีแค่เธอ) by Nanon Korapat
6. "Just So You Know" (แค่...) by Mek Jirakit
7. "I'm OK" (ไม่เป็นไร) by Toy Pathompong
8. "Invisible Tears" (เก็บความรู้สึกเก่ง) by Tay Tawan
9. "What's on Your Mind?" (ยังรักกันอยู่ไหม) by Pluem Purim
Adolescent by Bright – released: June 17, 2023
1. "My Ecstasy"
2. "Saturday Night" (มาดูแมวดำน้ำทำกับข้าวบ้านเรามั้ย)
3. "I Think of You"
4. "Try"
The Secrets of the Universe by Nanon – released: November 15, 2023
1. "Spark!"
2. "Cute Cute" (มองกี่ทีก็น่ารัก) (Album Edition)
3. "YOUniverse" (จักรวาลเธอ) (Album Edition)
4. "Knock Knock"
5. "Please Try Again" (ความพยายามอยู่ที่ไหน)
6. "How Much?" (เคยมาเท่าไหร่)
7. "Why Always Me?" (ทำไมต้องเป็นฉัน)
8. "Butterfly Effect"
9. "B612" (ดาวเดิม)
10. "Unidentified Wonder" (สิ่งมหัศจรรย์ที่ไม่มีรูปแบบ)
11. "My Universe Is You" (จักรวาลที่ฉันต้องการมีแค่เธอ) (Album Edition)
12. "The Secrets of the Universe"
Best of GMMTV – released: March 19, 2025
1. "Eye Contact" (เสียงจากสายตา) by Krist Perawat and Singto Prachaya
2. "No Definition" (ไม่มีนิยาม) (from Dark Blue Kiss) by Tay Tawan and New Thitipoom
3. "คั่นกู" (from 2gether) by Bright Vachirawit
4. "Still Together" (ยังคู่กัน) (from Still 2gether) by Bright Vachirawit and Win Metawin
5. "Ten Years Later" (อีก 10 ปีก็ยังรัก!) (from 2gether: The Movie) by Win Metawin
6. "Too Cute to Handle" (ไม่รักไม่ลง) by Off Jumpol and Gun Atthaphan
7. "Beside" (ข้างๆ) (from Fish upon the Sky) by Louis Thanawin
8. "A Tale of Thousand Stars" (นิทานพันดาว) (from A Tale of Thousand Stars) by Gun Napat
9. "Just Friend?" (แค่เพื่อนมั้ง) (from Bad Buddy) by Nanon Korapat
10. "Who Am I" (from F4 Thailand: Boys Over Flowers) by Bright Vachirawit, Win Metawin, Dew Jirawat and Nani Hirunkit
11. "My Starlight" (แล้วแต่ดาว) (from Star in My Mind) by Joong Archen
12. "Closer" (ไม่ไกลหัวใจ) (from Cupid's Last Wish) by Earth Pirapat and Mix Sahaphap
13. "I Have Found" (เป็นเธอใช่ไหม) (from Vice Versa) by Sea Tawinan
14. "You Got Ma Back" (ไหล่เธอ) (from My School President) by Fourth Nattawat, Winny Thanawin, Satang Kittiphop and Ford Allan
15. "Hook" (เพลงรัก) (from My School President) by Gemini Norawit
16. "My Luck" (มีเธอนี่แหละดี) (from A Boss and a Babe) by Book Kasidet
17. "Let's Try" (เอาเลยมั้ย) (from Only Friends) by Khaotung Thanawat
18. "Last Twilight" (ภาพสุดท้าย) (from Last Twilight) by William Jakrapatr
19. "Tilt" (โลกเอียง) (from 23.5) by Milk Pansa and Love Pattranite
20. "Truth in the Eyes" (แค่ในวันนั้น) (from We Are) by Pond Naravit and Phuwin Tangsakyuen
21. "First Love" (รักแรก) (from My Precious) by Gemini Norawit (Japanese version)
22. "Living for You" (เพื่อเธอแค่หนึ่งเดียว) (from Never Let Me Go) by Phuwin Tangsakyuen (Japanese version)
Dusk & Dawn by LYKN – released: October 14, 2025
1. "เลิกกับเขาเดี๋ยวเหงาเป็นเพื่อน" (May I?)
2. "UMM UMM"
3. "แอบรักไม่ทำให้ใครตาย" (No Worries)
4. "ฉ่ำ" (Charm) (Feat. Joong Archen and Pond Naravit)
5. "ความรักไม่ได้น่ากลัวขนาดนั้น" (Trust Me)
6. โฮ่ง!" (Sugoi)
7. "ทัก" (First Sight)
8. "น้ำหยดลงหิน" (Drip)
9. "หน้าเบลอหลังชัด" (Foreground)
10. "ชอบก็บอก" (Feel Like Me)
11. "หยอกไม่หลอก" (Trick or Treat) (Feat. Chrrissa)
12. "LYKYOU"
SEVEN: The Second Chapter by Nanon – released: November 7, 2025
1. "Make You Mine"
2. "Bad" (คนไม่ดี)
3. "Dissatisfied" (พอใจ)
4. "Shiftless" (ไม่อยากรัก)
5. "Fake U" (รำไม่ดีโทษปี่โทษกู)
6. "Why, Why, Why?!" (ทำไมไม่เป็นฉัน) (Feat. The Darkest Romance)
7. "It's Me" (ฉันอยู่ดี)
Best of GMMTV Vol. 2 – released: April 22, 2026
1. "Re-Move On" (ลบยัง) (from My Love Mix-Up!) by Gemini Norawit and Fourth Nattawat
2. "Love Training" (ฝึกรัก) (from The Trainee) by Gun Atthaphan
3. "Perfect" (วันนี้) (from Perfect 10 Liners) by Force Jiratchapong, Book Kasidet, Perth Tanapon, Santa Pongsapak, Junior Panachai and Mark Jiruntanin
4. "Love Suspect" (ผู้ร้ายปากแข็ง) (from Perfect 10 Liners) by Force Jiratchapong and Book Kasidet
5. "No One Else" (แค่เธอเท่านั้น) (from Perfect 10 Liners) by Perth Tanapon and Santa Pongsapak
6. "Trial Love" (ทดลองรัก) (from Perfect 10 Liners) by Junior Panachai and Mark Jiruntanin
7. "Pluto" (พลูโต) (from Pluto) by Namtan Tipnaree and Film Rachanun
8. "Promise" (ไม่ทิ้งกัน) (from High School Frenemy) by Sky Wongravee and Nani Hirunkit
9. "Would You Mind?" (จีบได้มั้ย) (from ThamePo: Heart That Skips a Beat) by LYKN
10. "5CM" (from ThamePo: Heart That Skips a Beat) by William Jakrapatr
11. "Destined" (ไม่ใช่บังเอิญ) (from ThamePo: Heart That Skips a Beat) by Tui Chayatorn
12. "Never Back Down" (ตื๊อเท่านั้นที่ครองโลก) (from The Heart Killers) by First Kanaphan, Khaotung Thanawat, Joong Archen and Dunk Natachai
13. "Hurt Me Please" (เจ้าความรัก) (from The Heart Killers) by Joong Archen
14. "Stuckling" (สะมะกึ๊กสะมะกั๊ก) (from Ossan's Love Thailand) by Earth Pirapat and Mix Sahaphap (feat. Jennie Panhan)
15. "No More" (ชอบแบบนี้) by Tay Tawan and New Thitipoom
16. "Ever After" (from My Golden Blood) by Joss Way-ar and Gawin Caskey
17. "Lesson One" (from Boys in Love) by Barcode Tinnasit
18. "Morning Love" (รักก็ได้) (from The Ex-Morning) by Krist Perawat and Singto Prachaya
19. "My Only Champion" (รางวัลคนเก่ง) (from Whale Store xoxo) by Milk Pansa and Love Pattranite
20. "Under the Moonlight" (ลิขิต) (from Revamp The Undead Story) by Boun Noppanut and Prem Warut
21. "More Than Words" (มากกว่าที่รัก) (from Us) by Emi Thasorn (Japanese version)
22. "Closer" (from My Golden Blood) by Gawin Caskey (Japanese version)
Silhouettes by Krist – released: October 20, 2026
1. "ถูกที่ผิดเวลา" (Wrong Time)
2. "เจ็บเมื่อไหร่" (Call Me)
3. "ประตูอากาศและวันดีดี"
4. "ยิ่งรักยิ่งเจ็บ"
5. "เติมเธอ" (Fill My Heart)
6. "ครบรอบไปด้วยกัน"
7. "ครบรอบไปด้วยกัน (Counting Till I Die)" (Feat. Fellow Fellow) (Album Edition)
8. "ดาวหางฮัลเลย์" (Feat. Fellow Fellow)
9. "ทำดีได้ดี ทำชั่วได้เธอ"
10. "เริ่มต้นใหม่ครั้งที่เท่าไหร่"
11. "คืนนี้ออกไหม" (Night Out)
12. "ย้อนเวลา" (REDO) (Album Edition)
13. "You're So Beautiful"
14. "Butterflies" (Album Edition)
15. "ความคิดถึงที่ไม่จำเป็น" (Friend Zone) (Feat. Nanon Korapat)
16. "Honey"
17. "นอนไม่พอ" (SLEEPLESS)
Reflexion by LYKN – pending release: TBA
1. "โลเล โยเย โมเม" (No Way)
2. "ถูกสเปก" (Let's Go) (Hongshi (Note: solo stage name of LYKN member Hong.) solo)
3. "ถ้าเกิด" (If Only)
4. "เทสดี" (Tasty) (Nutdan (Note: solo stage name of LYKN member Nut.) solo)
5. "จำได้ว่าลืม" (Flashback) (William solo)
6. "ปล่อยใจ" (Bloom) (Tui solo)
7. "หน้าไหว้หลังหลอก" (Oh My Gosh)
8. "ไม่รวยไม่คุย" (Rich) (Lego solo)
9. "ครั้งแรกพอทน" (Not Again) Feat. JOKE iScream
10. TBA
11. TBA
12. TBA

== Filmography ==
=== Films ===
==== As Production Company ====
Year	Title	(Thailand) Thai title	Release date	Co-production company(s)	Notes	Ref.
2016	Little Big Dream	ความฝันอันสูงสุด	December 5, 2016 (One31); October 1, 2017 (GMM 25)		A short television film to honour and pay tribute to His Majesty King Bhumibol Adulyadej.	
2021	2gether: The Movie	เพราะเราคู่กัน The Movie	June 4, 2021 (Japan); November 11, 2021 (Thailand); February 11, 2022 (Disney+ Hotstar)	Nar-ra-tor; Housestories 8	The movie adaptation of boys' love series 2gether and Still 2gether.	
2023	My Precious	รักแรก โคตรลืมยาก	April 27, 2023 (Thailand); November 3, 2023 (Netflix)	Nar-ra-tor	Adaptation of You Are the Apple of My Eye. originally set for release in 2020 but was postponed due to the COVID-19 impact.	
2024	Love You to Debt	เธอ ฟอร์ แคช สินเชื่อ..รักแลกเงิน	April 25, 2024 (Thailand)	Parbdee Tawesuk	Adaptation of Man in Love.	formerly named The Interest ผ่อนรักนอกระบบ.

==== As Co-Production Company ====
Year	Title	(Thailand) Thai title	Release date	Production company(s)	Notes	Ref.
2023	Congrats My Ex!	ลุ้นรักป่วน ก๊วนแฟนเก่า	November 16, 2023 (Amazon Prime Video)	Benetone Films; T&B Global Media (co-production); Slap Monsters (co-production); PTG Entertainment (co-production); W Empire (co-production)		

=== Drama ===
Most of GMMTV's drama and television series plot and screenplay are based on or adapted from fictions and novels.

Currently, GMMTV-produced series and dramas air from Mondays to Sundays at 8:30-9:30 pm (ICT) through Channel GMM25, while the full uncut version of series' episodes are made available right after airing or delayed telecast through their respective partner streaming services, (Such as AIS Play, Viu, WeTV, Disney+ Hotstar and oneD).

The divided portions of series' episodes will be airing simulcast for international viewers through GMMTV's official YouTube channel. These may be supplemented by English subtitles or captions.

Year	Title	(Thailand) Thai title	Network	Co-production company(s)	Notes	Ref.
1995	Sarm Num Sarm Mum	3 หนุ่ม 3 มุม	Channel 7		Sitcom produced from 1995 to 1998 by Exact Co., Ltd. the subsidiary of Grammy Television.	
1995	Lud Fah Ma Ha Ruk	ลัดฟ้ามาหารัก	Channel 5		Produced by Exact Co., Ltd. the subsidiary of Grammy Television.	
2003	Rak Harm Promote	รักห้ามโปรโมท	iTV		Produced by Exact Co., Ltd. the subsidiary of Grammy Television.	
2005	Girl Gang Malang Za	เกิร์ลแก๊งแมลงซ่า	Channel 3		Produced under the name Grammy Television.	
2005	Phor Kae Kab Mae Chan	พ่อแกกับแม่ฉัน	Channel 3		Produced under the name Grammy Television.	
2008	Love Beyond Frontier	อุบัติรักข้ามขอบฟ้า	Modernine TV; Bang Channel			
2009	Love Beyond Frontier 2	อุบัติรักข้ามขอบฟ้า 2	Modernine TV; Bang Channel		Sequel to Love Beyond Frontier.	
2010	Chocolate Sweethearts	ช็อกโกแลต 5 ฤดู	Modernine TV; Bang Channel			
2011	Rongngan Samran Jai	โรงงานสำราญใจ	Thai PBS			
2011	Dolphins Dream Fight	โลมากล้าท้าฝัน	Modernine TV; Bang Channel			
2012	Si Roon Si Woon The Series	4 รุ่น 4 วุ่น เดอะซีรีส์	Modernine TV; Bang Channel			
2012	Rak Jing Ping Ker	รักจริงปิ๊งเก้อ	Bang Channel		Based on topics from TV talk show with the same title.	
2013	Love Balloon	รักพองลม	Bang Channel			
2013	Forward	ท้าเวลา พลิกอนาคต	Modernine TV; Bang Channel			
2021	Nabi, My Stepdarling	นาบี ฉันจะไม่รักเธอ	GMM 25	Prakaifah Production		
2021	Mr. Lipstick	แต้มรัก	GMM 25	Keng Kwang Kang Waisai	Based on the novel with the same title.	
2021	An Eye for an Eye	เธอ เขา เงาแค้น	GMM 25	Anda99		
2021	Irresistible	สั่งใจให้หยุดรักเธอ	GMM 25	GoodBoy Entertainment	Adaptation of Roy Ruk Raeng Kaen that adapted from the novel "เมียนอกหัวใจ"	
2022	The War of Flowers	สงครามดอกไม้	GMM 25	GoodBoy Entertainment		
2022	Drag, I Love You	นางฟ้าคาบาเรต์	GMM 25	Prakaifah Production		
2022	Devil Sister	แอ๊บร้ายให้นายไม่รัก	GMM 25	Keng Kwang Kang Waisai	Based on the novel "Beauty and The Guy รักของนางร้าย"	
2022	Astrophile	คืนนับดาว	GMM 25	Keng Kwang Kang Waisai	Based on the novel "คิมหันต์พันดาว"	

=== TV series ===
Year	Title	(Thailand) Thai title	Network	Co-production company(s)	Notes	Ref.
2014	Room Alone 401-410	—N/a	One HD; Bang Channel			
2015	Wifi Society	—N/a	One HD; Bang Channel		Based on the popular topics on Pantip.com.	
2015	Ugly Duckling	รักนะเป็ดโง่	GMM 25; Bang Channel		Based on and adapted from "Ugly Duckling ลูกเป็ดขี้เหร่" fiction series.	
2015	Wonder Teacher	อัศจรรย์คุณครูเทวดา	One31; Bang Channel	Sea Studio		
2015	Room Alone 2	—N/a	One31; Bang Channel		Sequel to Room Alone 401-410.	
2015	Love Flight	รักสุดท้ายที่ปลายฟ้า	GMM 25; Bang Channel			
2016	Kiss: The Series	รักต้องจูบ	GMM 25		Based on "Pink Kiss" and "Natural Kiss" fictions.	
2016	Senior Secret Love	รุ่นพี่ Secret Love	One31	Housestories 8		
2016	U-Prince	—N/a	GMM 25	Baa-Ram-Ewe	Based on the original "U-Prince" fiction series.	
2016	Lovey Dovey	แผนร้ายนายเจ้าเล่ห์	One31		Based on "Lovey Brother" and "Dovey Sister" fictions.	
2016	SOTUS	พี่ว้ากตัวร้ายกับนายปีหนึ่ง	One31	Felloww	Based on the fiction with the same title.	
2016	Senior Secret Love: My Lil Boy 2	น้อง ม.4 พี่ปี 1	One31	Housestories 8	Sequel to Senior Secret Love: My Lil Boy, based on the fiction with the same title.	
2017	Senior Secret Love: Puppy Honey 2	สแกนหัวใจ นายหมอหมา	One31	Housestories 8	Sequel to Senior Secret Love: Puppy Honey.	
2017	Water Boyy	—N/a	GMM 25		Adapted from 2015 film version.	
2017	Slam Dance	ทุ่มฝันสนั่นฟลอร์	One31	Studio Commuan		
2017	My Dear Loser	รักไม่เอาถ่าน	GMM 25			
2017	Teenage Mom: The Series	คุณแม่วัยใส The Series	LINE TV; One HD	Housestories 8	Web series adapted from "คุณแม่วัยใส (Teenage Mom)" comic on LINE WEBTOON.	
2017	Secret Seven	เธอคนเหงากับเขาทั้งเจ็ด	One31			
2017	Fabulous 30: The Series	30 กำลังแจ๋ว The Series	One31		Adapted from 2011 film version.	
2017	SOTUS S	—N/a	One31	Bear House Production	Sequel to SOTUS.	
2018	Wake Up Ladies: The Series	Wake Up ชะนี The Series	One31	Parbdee Taweesuk	Adapted from "Wake Up ชะนี" paperback.	
2018	Love Bipolar	เลิฟนะคะ รักนะครับ	GMM 25	On & On Infinity		
2018	Kiss Me Again	จูบให้ได้ถ้านายแน่จริง	GMM 25	Housestories8	Paraquel and prequel to Kiss the Series, based on "Violet Kiss", "Red Kiss", "Peach Kiss", and "Blue Kiss" fictions.	
2018	YOUniverse	จักรวาลเธอ	LINE TV; YouTube; Facebook; GMM 25			
2018	'Cause You're My Boy	อาตี๋ของผม	One31	COSOCOMO	Based on the fiction with the same title.	
2018	Mint To Be	นายนั่นแหละ… คู่แท้ของฉัน	GMM 25	Baa-Ram-Ewe	Adapted from "เขาว่ากันว่า… นายเกิดมาเพื่อเป็นของฉัน!" fiction.	
2018	The Gifted	นักเรียนพลังกิฟต์	One31	Parbdee Taweesuk	Adapted from the 2015 short film version and "ภารกิจลับ นักเรียนพลังกิฟต์" novel.	
2018	Love at First Hate	มารร้ายคู่หมายรัก	One31	On & On Infinity	Based on the novel with the same title.	
2018	Happy Birthday	วันเกิดของนาย วันตายของฉัน	GMM 25	Nar-ra-tor		
2018	Friend Zone	เอา ให้ ชัด	One31	Trasher Bangkok		
2018	Our Skyy	อยากเห็นท้องฟ้าเป็นอย่างวันนั้น	LINE TV; GMM 25	Beluga Production (Note: Arthit-Kongpob episode only)	Sequel/Special episode anthology series of: Pick-Rome from Senior Secret Love: Puppy Honey & Senior Secret Love: Puppy Honey 2; In-Sun from My Dear Loser: Edge of 17; Tee-Mork from 'Cause You're My Boy; Pete-Kao from Kiss: The Series & Kiss Me Again; Arthit-Kongpob from SOTUS & SOTUS S	
2019	Wolf	เกมล่าเธอ	One31			
2019	He's Coming to Me	เขามาเชงเม้งข้างๆ หลุมผมครับ	LINE TV; GMM 25		Adapted from the fiction with the same title.	
2019	Boy For Rent	ผู้ชายให้เช่า	One31	Keng Kwang Kang	Adapted from "Badz Boy For Rent" and "Sexy Boy For Rent" fictions.	
2019	Love Beyond Frontier	อุบัติรักข้ามขอบฟ้า	GMM 25	Lasercat; Parbdee Taweesuk	Remaking of 2008 Love Beyond Frontier drama.	
2019	Theory of Love	ทฤษฎีจีบเธอ	GMM 25		Based on the fiction with the same title.	
2019	3 Will Be Free	สามเราต้องรอด	One31	Trasher Bangkok		
2019	Endless Love	รักหมดใจ	GMM 25	Keng Kwang Kang	Adapted from 2010 Taiwanese "Endless Love" drama.	
2019	The Sand Princess	เจ้าหญิงเม็ดทราย	GMM 25	On & On Infinity	Based on the novel with the same title.	
2019	Dark Blue Kiss	จูบสุดท้ายเพื่อนายคนเดียว	GMM 25		Sequel to Kiss Me Again, based on "Dark Blue Kiss" fiction.	
2019	Blacklist	นักเรียนลับ บัญชีดำ	GMM 25	Lasercat	Adapted from Blacklist novel series: Blacklist ปิดบัญชีลับฉีกกฎหัวใจให้เรารักกัน; Black Date เดตลับๆ ฉบับเราสองคน; Black Secret พลิกบัญชีลับซ่อนหัวใจ (ไม่) ให้รักเธอ; Black Kiss สลับกฎร้ายให้หัวใจบอกรักเธอ; Black Heart ผมโสดครับ... โปรดรับผิดชอบด้วย; B(l)ack to School สวัสดีครับ... ยินดีต้อนรับสู่ห้อง 6/6; Black Council ไอดอลดวงกุด... ขอฉุดหัวใจคุณประธาน	
2019	A Gift For Whom You Hate	ของขวัญเพื่อคนที่คุณเกลียด	One31	Nar-ra-tor	Based on "The Gift Shop For Whom You Hate" (ร้านของขวัญเพื่อคนที่คุณเกลียด) from the Thai comic book My Mania 2 (2014) by Eakasit Thairaat	
2019	One Night Steal	แผนรักสลับดวง	GMM 25	Parbdee Taweesuk	Adapted from Just My Luck film.	
2020	Angel Beside Me	เทวดาท่าจะรัก	GMM 25		Based on "Angel Beside Me รัก (หล่น) จากฟากฟ้า" fiction.	
2020	Turn Left Turn Right	สมองเลี้ยวซ้าย หัวใจเลี้ยวขวา	GMM 25	Lasercat; Parbdee Taweesuk	Adapted from Jimmy Liao's "Turn Left, Turn Right (A Chance of Sunshine)".	
2020	2gether: The series	เพราะเราคู่กัน	GMM 25	Housestories 8	Adapted from the fiction with the same title.	
2020	Girl Next Room	หอนี้ชะนีแจ่ม	GMM 25	Gmo Films	Based on "9irlfriends" fiction series: Motorbike Baby วินสุดหล่อขอส่งเธอให้ถึงหัวใจ; Midnight Fantasy สถานีขี้เซาของเราสองคน; Richy Rich! รวยมากนะ! รู้ยังคะทุกคน; Security Love ยามหล่อบอกต่อว่ารัก	
2020	Who Are You	เธอคนนั้น คือ ฉันอีกคน	GMM 25	Nar-ra-tor	Adapted from Who Are You: School 2015 series.	
2020	The Shipper	จิ้นนายกลายเป็นฉัน	GMM 25	Parbdee Taweesuk		
2020	Still 2gether	เพราะเรา (ยัง) คู่กัน	GMM 25		Sequel to 2gether: The series.	
2020	The Gifted: Graduation	—N/a	GMM 25	Parbdee Taweesuk	Sequel and prequel to The Gifted (2018).	
2020	My Gear and Your Gown	เกียร์สีขาวกับกาวน์สีฝุ่น	WeTV; GMM 25	Studio Wabi Sabi	Based on the novel with the same title.	
2020	I'm Tee, Me Too	คนละทีเดียวกัน	GMM 25; AIS Play			
2020	Friend Zone 2: Dangerous Area	—N/a	GMM 25	Trasher Bangkok	Sequel and prequel to Friend Zone.	
2020	Theory of Love: Stand By Me	ทฤษฎีจีบเธอ Stand By Me	YouTube; GMM 25		Special episode of Theory of Love (2019).	
2020	Tonhon Chonlatee	ต้นหนชลธี	GMM 25; AIS Play	Keng Kwang Kang Waisai	Based on the novel with the same title.	
2020	Wake Up Ladies: Very Complicated	Wake Up ชะนี: Very Complicated	GMM 25	Parbdee Taweesuk	Sequel to Wake Up Ladies The Series.	
2021	A Tale of Thousand Stars	นิทานพันดาว 1000stars	GMM 25		Based on the fiction with the same title.	
2021	Girl2K	สาวออฟฟิศ 2000 ปี	GMM 25			
2021	Fish Upon the Sky	ปลาบนฟ้า	GMM 25	Gmo Films	Based on the novel with the same title.	
2021	Oh My Boss	นายคะอย่ามาอ่อย	GMM 25	FuKDuK Production	Based on the fiction with the same title.	
2021	The Comments	ทุกความคิดเห็น..มีฆ่า	GMM 25	Nar-ra-tor		
2021	46 Days	46วัน ฉันจะพังงานวิวาห์	GMM 25; AIS Play	Keng Kwang Kang Waisai	Based on the novel with the same title.	
2021	Bad Buddy	แค่เพื่อนครับเพื่อน	GMM 25		Based on the novel "หลังม่าน Behind the Scenes" by Afterday, West	
2021	Baker Boys	รักของผม ขนมของคุณ	GMM 25	Baa-Ram-Ewe	Based on the Japanese manga Antique Bakery by Fumi Yoshinaga	
2021	55:15 Never Too Late	—N/a	Disney+ Hotstar; GMM 25	Gmo Films		
2021	Not Me	เขา...ไม่ใช่ผม	GMM 25; AIS Play	Gmo Films	Adapted from the novel "Not Me เด็ก ถ่อย รัก จริง" by Saisioo	
2021	F4 Thailand: Boys Over Flowers	หัวใจรักสี่ดวงดาว	GMM 25	Parbdee Taweesuk	Adaptation of Boys Over Flowers.	
2021	The Player	รัก เป็น เล่น ตาย	GMM 25	Trasher Bangkok		
2022	Enchanté	ใครคืออองชองเต	GMM 25		Based on the novel with the same title.	
2022	Cupid's Last Wish	พินัยกรรมกามเทพ	Disney+ Hotstar; GMM 25	Gmo Films	Based on the novel with the same title.	
2022	Star & Sky: Star in My Mind | Sky in Your Heart	แล้วแต่ดาว | ขั้วฟ้าของผม	GMM 25	Studio Wabi Sabi	Adapted from the novels "แล้วแต่ดาว" & "ขั้วฟ้าของผม" by peachhplease	
2022	Mama Gogo	แม่มาคุม...หนุ่มบาร์ร้อน	GMM 25	Hard Feeling Film		
2022	Oops! Mr. Superstar Hit on Me	ซุป'ตาร์กับหญ้าอ่อน	GMM 25	On & On Infinity	Based on the novel with the same title.	
2022	Vice Versa	รักสลับโลก	GMM 25; YouTube		Based on the novel with the same title.	
2022	P.S. I Hate You	ด้วยรักและหักหลัง	GMM 25	Snap25	Based on the novel "วงกตดอกไม้"	
2022	Good Old Days	ร้านซื้อขายความทรงจำ	Disney+ Hotstar; GMM 25	Parbdee Taweesuk	Adapted from comic books by สะอาด: บทกวีชั่วชีวิต; ชายผู้ออกเดินทางตามเสียงของตัวเอง; ให้รักเป็นบทกวีชั่วชีวิต	
2022	My Dear Donovan	โดโนวาน...ที่รัก	GMM 25	Gmo Films	Adapted from the novel "Sexy Guy, My Sexy Love" by ณารา	
2022	Magic of Zero	—N/a	GMM 25; YouTube	Dee Hup House	Sequel and spin-off mini-series of: Ink-Pa from Bad Buddy; Korn-Win from Cupid's Last Wish; and an original story of Fong-Maki	
2022	The Eclipse	คาธ	GMM 25	All This Entertainment	Based on the novel with the same title.	
2022	The Three GentleBros	คู่แท้ แม่ไม่เลิฟ	GMM 25	Keng Kwang Kang Waisai	Adapted from "เท่าที่... รัก" novel series: เท่าที่ใจ... เว้าวอน; เท่าที่รู้... ผมเป็นของคุณ; เท่าที่หวง... ดังดวงใจ	
2022	My School President	แฟนผมเป็นประธานนักเรียน	GMM 25		Based on the novel "My President แฟนผมเป็นประธาน" by Pruesapha	
2022	The Warp Effect	รูปลับรหัสวาร์ป	GMM 25	Hard Feeling Film		
2022	Never Let Me Go	เพื่อนายแค่หนึ่งเดียว	GMM 25; YouTube	Hard Feeling Film		
2022	10 Years Ticket	หนังรักเรื่องที่แล้ว	GMM 25	Nar-ra-tor		
2022	Midnight Series: Midnight Motel	แอปลับ โรงแรมรัก	Disney+ Hotstar; GMM 25	Wakeup Rabbit Studio		
2023	Midnight Series: Dirty Laundry	ซักอบร้ายนายสะอาด	Disney+ Hotstar; GMM 25	Hard Feeling Film		
2023	Midnight Series: Moonlight Chicken	พระจันทร์มันไก่	Disney+ Hotstar; GMM 25			
2023	A Boss and a Babe	ชอกะเชร์คู่กันต์	GMM 25	Studio Wabi Sabi	Based on the novel with the same title.	
2023	Midnight Museum	พิพิธภัณฑ์รัตติกาล	GMM 25	Anda99		
2023	UMG (Unidentified Mystery Girlfriend)	รักแรกหายไป ได้ใครมาวะ?	GMM 25	Parbdee Taweesuk		
2023	Double Savage	สองเดือดเลือดเดียวกัน	GMM 25	Eightfinity (Note: uncredited)		
2023	Our Skyy 2	อยากเห็นท้องฟ้าเป็นอย่างวันนั้น 2	GMM 25; YouTube	Hard Feeling Film (Note: Our Skyy เพื่อนายแค่หนึ่งเดียว only); Studio Wabi Sabi (Note: Our Skyy แล้วแต่ดาว & Our Skyy ชอกะเชร์คู่กันต์ only); All This Entertainment (Note: Our Skyy คาธ only)	Sequel/Special episode anthology series of: Palm-Nuengdiao from Never Let Me Go; Khabkluen-Daonuea from Star & Sky: Star in My Mind; Akk-Ayan from The Eclipse; Puen-Talay from Vice Versa; Tinn-Gun from My School President; Gun-Cher from A Boss and a Babe; Pat-Pran from Bad Buddy; Phupha-Tian from A Tale of Thousand Stars	
2023	Be My Favorite	บทกวีของปีแสง	GMM 25	Parbdee Taweesuk	Adapted from the novel with the same title.	
2023	Loneliness Society	โคตรเหงา เรา2คน	GMM 25	Keng Kwang Kang	Adapted from While You Were Sleeping film.	
2023	Home School	นักเรียนต้องขัง	Amazon Prime Video; GMM 25	Nar-ra-tor		
2023	Hidden Agenda	วาระซ่อนเร้น	GMM 25; YouTube	Dee Hup House	Based on the novel with the same title.	
2023	Enigma	คน มนตร์ เวท	GMM 25; Amazon Prime Video	Parbdee Taweesuk		
2023	The Jungle	เกมรัก นักล่า บาร์ลับ	GMM 25	Snap25	Based on the novel "The Jungle : ป่า / ล่า / รัก"	
2023	Only Friends	เพื่อนต้องห้าม	GMM 25	Hard Feeling Film		
2023	Dangerous Romance	หัวใจในสายลม	GMM 25	Fillframe		
2023	Wednesday Club	คนกลางแล้วไง	GMM 25	Keng Kwang Kang	Adapted from the novel "ตุ๊กตาแต้มสี" by สุนันทา	
2023	Faceless Love	รักไม่รู้หน้า	Amazon Prime Video; GMM 25	Keng Kwang Kang	Adapted from 2012 Japanese Rich Man, Poor Woman series.	
2023	Last Twilight	ภาพนายไม่เคยลืม	GMM 25; YouTube			
2023	Cooking Crush	อาหารเป็นยังไงครับหมอ	GMM 25	Gmo Films	Adapted from the novel "Love Course! เสื้อกาวน์รุกเสื้อกุ๊กรับ" by iJune4S	
2023	Cherry Magic	30 ยังซิง	GMM 25		Adaptation of Cherry Magic! Thirty Years of Virginity Can Make You a Wizard?!.	
2023	Find Yourself	หารักด้วยใจเธอ	GMM 25	Insight Entertainment	Adapted from 2020 Chinese Find Yourself series.	
2024	Beauty Newbie	หัวใจไม่มีปลอม	GMM 25	Wattpad WEBTOON Studios; Parbdee Taweesuk	Adaptation of My ID is Gangnam Beauty.	
2024	23.5	23.5 องศาที่โลกเอียง	GMM 25	Nar-ra-tor	Based on the novel with the same title.	
2024	My Precious The Series	รักแรกโคตรลืมยาก The Series	GMM 25; YouTube	Nar-ra-tor	Extended version of 2023 film with the same name, which is an adaptation of You Are the Apple of My Eye.	
2024	Only Boo!	แค่ที่แกง	GMM 25; YouTube	Gmo Films	Based on the novel with the same title.	
2024	We Are	คือเรารักกัน	GMM 25	Studio Wabi Sabi	Originally a project by Studio Wabi Sabi, adapted from the novel of the same title.	
2024	Ploy's Yearbook	หนังสือรุ่นพลอย	GMM 25	Snap25	Adapted from "หนังสือรุ่น" novel series: The Only Regret สิ่งเดียวที่เสียดาย ในวันวัยที่สวยงาม; Moving Around You ดาวหมุนรอบฉัน ตะวันหมุนรอบเธอ; Secretly Love เพราะเธอคือความลับของหัวใจ; Busy February หรือเดือนกุมภามันสั้น เราเลยรักกันไม่ได้เสียที; Faded Memory ภาพสีจางกับบางความทรงจำ	
2024	Wandee Goodday	วันดีวิทยา	GMM 25	All This Entertainment	Based on the novel with the same title.	
2024	A Love So Beautiful	เพราะเธอคือรักแรก	GMM 25	Insight Entertainment	Adaptation of A Love So Beautiful.	
2024	My Love Mix-Up!	เขียนรักด้วยยางลบ	GMM 25		Adaptation of My Love Mix-Up!	
2024	The Trainee	ฝึกงานเทอมนี้ รักพี่ได้ไหม	GMM 25	Parbdee Taweesuk		
2024	Summer Night	ความลับในคืนฤดูร้อน	GMM 25	LINE Webtoon Thailand	Based on the web comic with the same title.	
2024	Peaceful Property	บ้านหลอน On Sale	GMM 25	Parbdee Taweesuk		
2024	Kidnap	ลับ-จ้าง-รัก	GMM 25	Anda99	Formerly named in Thai ลับ-จ้าง-ลัก	
2024	High School Frenemy	มิตรภาพ คราบศัตรู	GMM 25	Nar-ra-tor	Adapted from School 2013 series.	
2024	Pluto	นิทาน ความรัก ดวงดาว	GMM 25	Snap25	Based on the novel with the same title.	
2024	Perfect 10 Liners	สายรหัสเทวดา	GMM 25	Studio Wabi Sabi	Adapted from "Engineer Cute Boy" novel series: วิศวกรรมประสาท; วิศวกรรณโยธา; วิศวะกับไฟฟ้า	
2024	The Heart Killers	เขาจ้างให้ผมจีบนักฆ่า	GMM 25	Gmo Films	Inspired by William Shakespeare's The Taming of the Shrew.	
2024	ThamePo Heart That Skips a Beat	เธมโป้	GMM 25	Parbdee Taweesuk		
2025	Ossan's Love Thailand	รักนี้ให้นาย	GMM 25		Adaptation of Ossan's Love.	
2025	Us	รักของเรา	GMM 25; YouTube	Nar-ra-tor	Adapted from the novel with the same title.	
2025	My Golden Blood	เลือดนายลมหายใจฉัน	GMM 25	Matching Max Solution		
2025	Sweet Tooth, Good Dentist	แฟนที่ทันตแพทย์ส่วนใหญ่แนะนำ	GMM 25	Hosanna Halelujah	Adapted from the novel with the same title.	
2025	Break Up Service	บริษัทลดรักเลิก	GMM 25	LINE Webtoon Thailand; Parbdee Taweesuk	Adapted from the web comic "Break-Up Service บริษัทรับจ้างทำลายรัก" by กอไหม	
2025	Leap Day	วันแก้ตาย	GMM 25	Keng Kwang Kang		
2025	Boys in Love	เปิดเทอมใหม่ หัวใจหัดรัก	GMM 25	Parbdee Taweesuk		
2025	I Love 'A Lot Of' You	รัก มาก เธอ	GMM 25	Parbdee Taweesuk		
2025	The Ex-Morning	เพราะแฟนเก่าเปลี่ยนแปลงบ่อย	GMM 25	Dream Dimension		
2025	Memoir of Rati	จาฤกรติชา	GMM 25	Cholumpi Production	Adapted from the novel with the same title.	
2025	Whale Store xoxo	คุณวาฬร้านชำ	GMM 25	Chamade Film	Based on the novel "คุณวาฬร้านชำ The Whale Store ร้านนี้ไม่มีรักขาย" by เสือดาวหิมะ.	
2025	Hide & Sis	น้องสาวหายนะ	GMM 25	Snap25	Based on the novel "เพลิงบุปผา".	
2025	Enigma Black Stage	บุหงาหมื่นภมร	One 31	Parbdee Taweesuk	Sequel to Enigma.	
2025	My Magic Prophecy	ทำนายทายทัพ	GMM 25	Maker–Y	Based on the novel with the same title.	
2025	Revamp The Undead Story	—N/a	GMM 25	Studio Wabi Sabi	Originally an independent project by Studio Wabi Sabi, it was formerly named "Vampire Project".	
2025	MuTeLuv	โปรดใช้วิจารณญาณในการรักเธอ	GMM 25	Parbdee Taweesuk		
2025	The Dark Dice	เกมทอยทะลุมิติ	GMM 25	Parbdee Taweesuk		
2025	That Summer	ผมเจอเจ้าชายบนชายหาด	One 31; YouTube	Chamade Film		
2025	Head 2 Head	ไหนใครว่าพวกมันไม่ถูกกัน	GMM 25	Studio Wabi Sabi	Based on the novel "ไหนใครว่าเจเจไม่ถูกกัน?" by My feline.	
2025	Friendshit Forever	เพื่อนสนิท พิษสหาย	GMM 25	Keng Kwang Kang		
2025	Me and Thee	มีสติหน่อยคุณธีร์	GMM 25	Gemmistry Studio	Based on the novel with the same title.	
2025	Burnout Syndrome	ภาวะรักคนหมดไฟ	GMM 25	Chamade Film		
2025	Melody of Secrets	ความลับในบทเพลงที่บรรเลงไม่รู้จบ	One 31	Snap25		
2025	Dare You to Death	ไขคดีเป็น เห็นคดีตาย	GMM 25	Keng Kwang Kang	Based on the novel with the same title.	
2026	Cat for Cash	เปย์รักด้วยแมวเลี้ยง	GMM 25	Gemmistry Studio		
2026	My Romance Scammer	รักจริง หลังแต่ง	GMM 25	Studio Wabi Sabi		
2026	Only Friends: Dream On	—N/a	One 31	Chamade Film	Sequel to Only Friends.	
2026	Girl Rules	กฎหลัก...ห้ามรักเธอ	GMM 25	Moongdoo Production		
2026	Love You Teacher	รักครูเท่าโลกเลย	GMM 25	Parbdee Taweesuk		
2026	Enemies with Benefits	ลัลล์ไม่ชอบไวน์	GMM 25	Snap25	Based on the novel with the same title.	
2026	Wu	อู	GMM 25	Parbdee Taweesuk		
2026	When Oranges Fall	ต้นส้มบ้านเขา แต่ผลส้มหล่นมาบ้านเราตลอดเลย	GMM 25	Studio Wabi Sabi	Based on the novel with the same title.	
2026	A Dog and a Plane	หมาเห่าเครื่องบิน	One 31	Chamade Film		
2026	Ticket to Heaven	เด็กชายไม่ไปสวรรค์	GMM 25	Gemmistry Studio		
2026	Mr. Kill	มังงะสั่งตาย	GMM 25	Keng Kwang Kang		
2026	Peach and Me	มีสติแล้วลูกพีช	GMM 25	Gemmistry Studio	Sequel to Me and Thee.	
2026	Match Point	รักนี้ต้องเสิร์ฟ	GMM 25	Keng Kwang Kang		
2026	Unlucky Bae	จุดจีบสายมู	GMM 25	Yolo Production	Based on the novel with the same title.	
2026	Moonshadow	เงาใต้พระจันทร์	GMM 25	Nar-ra-tor	Based on the novel with the same title.	
2026	Weirdo-101	แรงโน้มถ่วงระหว่างเรา	One 31	H8 Production	Based on the novel with the same title.	
2026	You Maniac	เดี๋ยวจะรักซะให้บ้า	GMM 25	Parbdee Taweesuk		
2026	Good Boy	จิรภัทรจะเป็นเด็กดี	GMM 25	Studio Wabi Sabi	Based on the webnovel with the same title.	
2026	Lovers & Gangsters	หงเสนคลุกฝุ่น	One 31	Cholumpi Production	Adapted from the novels "Hong Sen Kao Yot" (หงเสนเก้ายอด) and "Seng Khluk Fun" (เส็งคลุกฝุ่น) by rolisrose.	
2026	Scarlet Heart Ullavee	ปาฏิหาริย์ข้ามกาลเวลา	One 31	Nar-ra-tor	Formerly named Scarlet Heart Thailand; Adapted from the novel Scarlet Heart by Tong Hua	
2026	Oxytoxin	จุนใจไอดาว	GMM 25	Parbdee Taweesuk		
2026	Gunshot	ผมหลงรักฆาตกร	GMM 25	Keng Kwang Kang		
2026	Kiss Me, Remember?	จำเลยจุ๊บ	TBA	Gemmistry Studio		
2026	Ditto	ระฟ้าหล่นสวรรค์	TBA	Snap25	Based on the novel with the same title.	
2026	Love's Echoes	ให้รักกังวานในใจ	TBA	Moongdoo Production	Adapted from plot of the same name from GMMTV Y Find Project.	
2026	Surf 'n' Love	—N/a	TBA	Gemmistry Studio		
2026	I Will Always Save You	โปรดอยู่ในความคุ้มครองของป้องปืน	TBA	Chamade Film		
2026	Roommate Chaos	หอในหัวใจวุ่นรัก	TBA	Chamade Film	Adapted from the novels "Rak-Thasat 311" (รักฐศาสตร์ 311), "Nithetsat 224" (นิเทศศาสตร์ 224), and "Sathapat 510" (สถาปัตย์ 510) by JittiRain.	
2026	Cupid's Ghost	ผีผลักให้รักคุณ	TBA	Cholumpi Brothers		
2026	Round One	รักวนกับคนเดิม	TBA	Parbdee Taweesuk		
2026	The Invisible Dragon	เคียงมังกร	TBA	Maker–Y		
2026	Write You Again	เขียนรักครั้งใหม่	TBA	Parbdee Taweesuk		
2026	Plan B to U	จากศัตรูสู่ที่รัก	TBA	Parbdee Taweesuk	Based on the novel with the same title.	
2026	17th Spring	ใบไม้ผลิปีที่ 17	TBA	Studio Wabi Sabi	Based on the novel with the same title.	
2026	Vamp: Eternal Destiny	—N/a	TBA	MDA Entertainment	Originally an independent project by MDA Entertainment.	
2026	Arrest and Action	ภารกิจลับ จับ จิ้น เดือด	TBA	Parbdee Taweesuk		
2026	Bake Love Feeling	ขนมปังชีสเนย	TBA	Dream Dimension	Based on the novel with the same title.	
2026	Wish upon a Star	คืนนั้นฉันมองเห็นดาวด้วยตาเปล่า	TBA	Gemmistry Studio		
2026	Her	รักของเธอ	TBA	Snap25		
2026	Twenty One	21 วัน ลองมารักกันดูไหม	TBA	Gemmistry Studio	Based on the novel with the same title.	
2026	The Spooky Love Tale	เขียนผีให้เธอรัก	TBA	TBA	Adapted from the webtoon "The Spooky Love Tale of Gongchan Seol" (설공찬전) by YSE.	
2026	Heartbound	สุดทางหัวใจ	TBA	Nar-ra-tor	Adapted from the novel "Sud Thang... Hua Jai" by Bacteria.	
2026	The Missing Sunshine	ดั่งแสงที่หายไป	TBA	Cholumpi Production		
2026	High & Low: Born to Be High	—N/a	TBA	Parbdee Taweesuk	An official overseas expansion of High&Low franchise.	
2027	A Season to Remember	ตรีวัชรกาล	TBA	Maker Y	Adapted from the webnovel "Triwatcharakan" (ตรีวัชรกาล) by coconutpie, maggie mae, and purepudding (สามโสภา).	
2027	Love After Class	มัธยมพบรัก	TBA	Studio Wabi Sabi	Adapted from the webnovel of the same name.	
2027	Beyond You	เพียงคุณที่อยู่เหนือกว่า	TBA	Chamade Film	Adapted from the webnovel of the same name.	
2027	Starscope	เขตเคียงดาว	TBA	Studio Wabi Sabi	Originally a project by Studio Wabi Sabi, adapted from the novel of the same title.	
2027	Above Her Class	ขอให้รักลงจอดอย่างปลอดภัย	TBA	Moongdoo Production		
2027	Shooting Stars	—N/a	TBA	Parbdee Taweesuk	Based on the original drama series Sh**ting Stars.	
2027	Pit Stop	จุดพักใจ	TBA	Cholumpi Production		
2027	Saran Wants You!	คุณสราญหาคู่	TBA	Keng Kwang Kang	Adapted from the webnovel "Khun Saran Ha Khu" (คุณสราญหาคู่) by Wan Kling (วาฬกลิ้ง).	
2027	Shrimply Mine	อย่ามาอยู่กับกุ้ง	TBA	Dream Dimension	Adapted from the webnovel "Ya Ma Yu Kap Kung" (อย่ามาอยู่กับกุ้ง) by theneoclassic.	
2027	Kiss Me, Stranger	เธอแปลกหน้า	TBA	Parbdee Taweesuk		
2027	Billionaire Biker	พี่วินร้อยล้าน กับหวานใจเกลือสมุทร	TBA	Dream Dimension	Based on the novel with the same title.	
2027	Pineapple Leaf Blade	คมใบสับปะรด	TBA	Chamade Film	Based on the novel by Jidanun Lueangpiansamut.	
2027	Our Melodies	ทํานองนั้น	TBA	Snap25	Adapted from the webnovel of the same name.	
2027	Cherish	วันที่ฟ้ามีเฌอ	TBA	Nar-ra-tor		
2027	Cinematch	หมี่ซีนีม่า	TBA	H8 Production	Adapted from the novel of the same name.	
2027	Pie and the 7 Witches	พายยกกำลังเจ็ด	TBA	Parbdee Taweesuk	Thai adaptation of the Japanese series Yamada-kun to 7-nin no Majo.	
2027	The Gentlemen's Blood	เลือดสุภาพบุรุษ	TBA	Chamade Film		
2027	My Beautiful Enemy	ที่ร้ายที่รัก	TBA	Life Creator	Adapted from the novel "For Her: Catching a Butterfly" (For Her ไม่ใช่สำหรับเธอ) by KWONAE.	
2027	Your Eyes, My Ears	สื่อรักสองสัมผัส	TBA	Nar-ra-tor		
2027	The Jigsoul	ยินดีด้วยรักได้ไปต่อ	TBA	Parbdee Taweesuk		
2027	Lost in Your Eyes	คนเดียวในสายตา	TBA	Nar-ra-tor		
2027	Stalemate	เกมรักหมากสุดท้าย	TBA	Parbdee Taweesuk		
2027	Blue Print	—N/a	TBA	Keng Kwang Kang		
2027	Be Mine	รักนี้เป็นของเธอ	TBA	Snap25	Adapted from the web novels "Be My Baby!" (ฺBe My Baby! #บมบบยูริ), "Be My Sugar!" (Be My Sugar! #บมชก), "Be My Boo!" (Be My Boo! #บมบ) and "More & More #Winniethecat" by Khun Phuying (คุณผู้หญิง).	
2027	Fake Boss, Real Boyfriend	จริงๆ แล้ว แฟนเราเป็นยามบริษัท	TBA	Parbdee Taweesuk		
2027	Our Lyrics	บทเพลงของความไม่จริงใจ	TBA	Gemmistry Studio	Adapted from the novel of the same name.	
2027	Safety Flirt	ห้ามเข้าใกล้ หัวใจกำลังทำงาน	TBA	Parbdee Taweesuk		
2027	I Wanna Hold Your Hand	อยากให้เราอยู่ตรงนี้	TBA	Chamade Film		
2027	52Hz	สองฝันสัญญาณเดียว	TBA	Happer House		
2027	Boys 4 Moms	ลูกเพื่อนแม่	TBA	Keng Kwang Kang	Adapted from the webnovels "Secret Garden" (Secret Garden ความลับของต้นไม้), "Music Box" (Music Box กล่องดนตรี), "Jewelry Design" (อัญมณีที่รัก), and "Water Color" (Water Color #ที่พักพิงสีน้ำ) by RIBBINBO.	
2027	Itaewon Class: Thai Edition	—N/a	TBA	Gemmistry Studio	Thai adaptation of the Korean original series Itaewon Class, still a working title.	
2027	The Halo	เทวดามาขอพร	TBA	Parbdee Taweesuk		
2027	My Professional Boyfriend	แฟนมืออาชีพ จีบ จ่าย จบ	TBA	Chamade Film		
2027	How to Survive My CEO	พัตลมอย่าแย่	TBA	Studio Wabi Sabi	Based on the novel "พัตลมอย่าแย่" by kunredbeb (คุณเรดเบ๊บ).	

Currently airing
In post-production or Not yet aired
In production or Filming
Upcoming
On hiatus or Unknown current status

==== Cancelled series ====
On 23 September 2020, GMMTV issued an official statement on the cancellation of the following series due to the COVID-19 pandemic:

Year	Title	(Thailand) Thai title	Co-production company(s)	Notes
2020	Devil Sister	รักของนางร้าย	Keng Kwang Kang Waisai	Resurrected in 2022 as Devil Sister แอ๊บร้ายให้นายไม่รัก
2020	Military of Love	กองร้อยอินเลิฟ	Boonnum Production	

On 22 November 2022, GMMTV announced during its "2023 DIVERSELY YOURS" conference that following series was cancelled due to scheduling conflicts.

Year	Title	(Thailand) Thai title	Co-production company(s)	Notes
2022	You Fight, and I Love	พี่ช้าง	Anda99	Based on the novel "Chang Thai หนูเป็นเมียพี่ช้าง"

On 28 November 2025, GMMTV announced the termination of the following series production due to the controversy surrounding the author.

Year	Title	(Thailand) Thai title	Co-production company(s)	Notes
2026	Replay	ย้อนรักเก่า ให้เรารักใหม่	Keng Kwang Kang Waisai	Adapted from the novels "Replay 1: Captain Plawan" (Replay 1: กัปตันปลาวาฬ), "Replay 2: Doctor Songkran" (Replay 2: คุณหมอสงกรานต์), and "Replay 3: God JJ" (Replay 3: เทพเจ้าเจเจ) by Shernara (เฌอนารา).

On 3 November 2026, GMMTV announced that due to unforeseen circumstances, and following discussions, the company and all relevant parties have mutually agreed to discontinue the production of the following series.

Year	Title	(Thailand) Thai title	Co-production company(s)	Notes
2026	Overdose	คืนแค้น	Snap25	

== Stage ==
Year	Title	(Thailand) Thai title	Venue	Co-production company(s)	Notes	Ref.
2026	The Love of Siam: The Musical	รักแห่งสยาม เดอะมิวสิคัล	Muangthai Rachadalai Theatre, Esplanade Ratchada	Studio Commuan; Sahamongkol Film International; Scenario	Adapted from the 2007 film Love of Siam	
2027	Dear Evan Hansen Thailand	—N/a	TBA	TBA	Adapted from the 2015 stage musical Dear Evan Hansen	

== Partnerships ==
- (Philippines) ABS-CBN
- (Japan) TV Asahi
