= Pluto (Thai TV series) =

2024–25 Thai television series

- Official series poster
- นิทาน ดวงดาว ความรัก
- Genre: Girls' love; Romantic drama
- Based on: Pluto: นิทาน ดวงดาว ความรัก by Chao Planoy (เจ้าปลาน้อย)
- Written by: Kusolin Mekviphat; Bangpahn Homjan
- Directed by: Snap25
- Starring: Tipnaree Weerawatnodom; Rachanun Mahawan
- Opening theme: พลูโต ("Pluto") by: Tipnaree Weerawatnodom; Rachanun Mahawan
- Ending theme: เรื่องเล่าของเจ้าหญิง ("A Princess' Tale") by: Tipnaree Weerawatnodom; Rachanun Mahawan
- Country of origin: Thailand
- Original language: Thai
- No. of seasons: 1
- No. of episodes: 12

Production
- Running time: 55 minutes
- Production companies: GMMTV; Snap25

Original release
- Network: GMM 25; YouTube; Viu
- Release: 19 October 2024 – 4 January 2025

Pluto (Thai: นิทาน ดวงดาว ความรัก RTGS: Nithan Duangdao Khwam Rak; lit. 'Tales, Stars, Love') is a Thai girls' love television series starring Tipnaree Weerawatnodom (Namtan) and Rachanun Mahawan (Film).

Adapted from the novel of the same name and produced by GMMTV together with Snap25, it was announced as one of the television series of GMMTV for 2024 during their "GMMTV2024: UP&ABOVE Part 1" event held on 17 October 2023. It is also the second girls' love series produced by GMMTV after 23.5. It officially premiered on GMM 25, GMMTV YouTube channel, and Viu on 19 October 2024 for 12 episodes, and ran until 4 January 2025.

== Synopsis ==
Ai-oon is forced to break up with May, her twin sister Oaboom's girlfriend, as per Oaboom's last request before she was involved in an accident on her wedding day. However, when Ai-oon meets May, she realizes that May is blind. Furthermore, May's kiss has Ai-oon's heart fluttering in ways she has never felt before. All of this causes Ai-oon to refuse to break up with her, instead professing her love and pretending to be her identical twin sister. This matter will not be simple, given that this relationship began with deception.

== Cast and characters ==
=== Main ===
- Tipnaree Weerawatnodom (Namtan) as Ai-oon / Oaboom Ingsamug
- Rachanun Mahawan (Film) as Metawee Mekasiri (May)

=== Supporting ===
- Duangdao Jarujinda as Duean (Ai-oon and Oaboom's grandmother)
- Rutricha Phapakithi (Ciize) as Pang (Ai-oon's friend)
- Ploynira Hiruntaveesin (Kapook) as Pim (Pang's girlfriend)
- Preeyaphat Lawsuwansiri (Earn) as Jan (Oaboom's friend)
- Neen Suwanamas as Ploy (May's ex-girlfriend)
- Sivakorn Lertchuchot (Guy) as Paul (Oaboom's husband)
- Weerayut Chansook (Arm) as Ton (May's cousin)
- Thinnaphan Tantui (Thor) as Kosol
- Kirati Puangmalee (Title) as Ben

=== Guest ===
- Juthapich Indrajundra (Jamie) as Franc (May's friend)
- Thishar Thurachon (Mint) as Ann (May's friend)
- Suphakorn Sriphotong (Pod) as Batman
- Nuttanan Khunwat (Earth)

== Soundtrack ==
No.	Title	Artist	Ref.
1	"เรื่องเล่าของเจ้าหญิง (A Princess' Tale)"	Namtan Tipnaree, Film Rachanun	
2	"พลูโต (Pluto)"	Namtan Tipnaree, Film Rachanun	
3	"นิยายเรื่องเธอ (Your Story)"	Namtan Tipnaree	
4	"Somewhere Only We Know"	Namtan Tipnaree	
5	"รอนะ (Linger)"	Film Rachanun	

== Awards and nominations ==
Year	Award	Category	Recipient(s)	Result	Ref.
2024	The Viral Hits Awards 2024	Most Popular Yuri Series of the Year Award	Pluto	Won	
2025	ContentAsia Awards 2025	Best LGBTQ+ Programme Made in Asia	Pluto	Nominated	
2025	Seoul International Drama Awards	Outstanding Asian Star (Thailand)	Film Rachanun	Won	
2025	Seoul International Drama Awards	Outstanding Asian Star (Thailand)	Namtan Tipnaree	Nominated	
2025	FEED x Khaosod Awards 2025	Top-Tier GL Series of the Year	Pluto	Won	
2025	FEED x Khaosod Awards 2025	Girl's Love Actress of the Year	Film Rachanun	Won	
2025	Y Entertain Awards 2025	Leading Girls’ Love Star of the Year	Namtan Tipnaree	Won	
2025	Y Entertain Awards 2025	Princess of Girls’ Love	Namtan Tipnaree	Won	
2025	Y Entertain Awards 2025	Best Y Series Director of the Year	Snap25 Team	Nominated	
2025	HOWE Awards 2025	Hottest Series Award	Pluto	Nominated	
2026	Y Universe Awards 2025	Best Social Commentary Series	Pluto	Nominated	
2026	Y Universe Awards 2025	Best Special Effect	Pluto	Nominated	
2026	Y Universe Awards 2025	The Best GL Series (Popular Vote)	Pluto	Nominated	
2026	Y Universe Awards 2025	Best Leading Actress (Jury Award)	Namtan Tipnaree	Nominated	
2026	Y Universe Awards 2025	Best Leading Role (Popular Vote)	Namtan Tipnaree	Nominated	
2026	Y Universe Awards 2025	Rising Star (Popular Vote)	Film Rachanun	Nominated	
2026	Y Universe Awards 2025	The Best Couple (Popular Vote)	Namtan Tipnaree and Film Rachanun	Won	
