= Wake Up Ladies: Very Complicated =

2020–21 Thai television series

- Official series poster
- Thai: Wake Up ชะนี: Very Complicated
- Genre: Romantic comedy; Drama
- Created by: GMMTV; Parbdee Taweesuk
- Based on: Wake Up ชะนี
- Directed by: Komgrit Triwimol; Rangsima Mathipornwanich
- Starring: Niti Chaichitathorn; Akhamsiri Suwanasuk; Apissada Kreurkongka; Maneerat Kam-Uan; Tipnaree Weerawatnodom; Methika Jiranorraphat
- Country of origin: Thailand
- Original language: Thai
- No. of episodes: 10

Production
- Production companies: GMMTV; Parbdee Taweesuk

Original release
- Network: GMM 25; LINE TV
- Release: 6 December 2020 – 14 February 2021

Related
- Wake Up Ladies: The Series

Wake Up Ladies: Very Complicated (Thai: Wake Up ชะนี: Very Complicated) is a 2020 Thai television series starring Niti Chaichitathorn (Pompam), Akhamsiri Suwanasuk (Jakjaan), Apissada Kreurkongka (Ice), Maneerat Kam-Uan (Ae), Tipnaree Weerawatnodom (Namtan) and Methika Jiranorraphat (Jane) which serves as the sequel of Wake Up Ladies: The Series (2018).

Directed by Komgrit Triwimol and Rangsima Mathipornwanich, and produced by GMMTV together with Parbdee Taweesuk, it is one of the twelve television series for 2020 showcased by GMMTV during their "New & Next" event on 15 October 2019. It premiered on GMM 25 and LINE TV on 6 December 2020, airing on Sundays at 20:30 ICT and 22:30 ICT, respectively.

== Cast and characters ==
Below are the cast of the series:

=== Main ===
- Niti Chaichitathorn (Pompam) as Dr. Nat
- Akhamsiri Suwanasuk (Jakjaan) as Jane
- Apissada Kreurkongka (Ice) as Chloe
- Maneerat Kam-Uan (Ae) as Aoey
- Tipnaree Weerawatnodom (Namtan) as Tata
- Methika Jiranorraphat (Jane) as Lookmai

=== Supporting ===
- Piyathida Mittiraroch as Piengkwan
- Katreeya English as Miriam
- Thanat Lowkhunsombat (Lee) as Saifah
- Kanaphan Puitrakul (First) as Ryu
- Benjamin Varney (Ben) as Boy
- Thongpoom Siripipat (Big) as Ton
- Luke Ishikawa Plowden as Jeff
- Phromphiriya Thongputtaruk (Papang) as Shin
- Paopetch Charoensook (Petch) as Ig
- Taveesak Phetpraneenukul (Tle) as Dummy (Boy's friend)
- Darisa Karnpoj (Pahn) as Lin

=== Guest ===
- Sivakorn Lertchuchot (Guy) as Ohm
- Chatchawit Techarukpong (Victor) as Jack
- Pusit Dittapisit (Fluke) as Mayom
- Ratthanant Janyajirawong (Ter) as Host
- Weerayut Chansook (Arm) as Jonathan
- Jirakit Kuariyakul (Toptap) as Shinjuku
- Anuchit Sapunpohng (Oh) as Im (Nutt's ex-boyfriend)
- Sarut Vichitrananda (Big) as Ball (Piengkwan's suitor)
