= The Three GentleBros =

2022 Thai television series

- Official series poster
- Thai: คู่แท้ แม่ไม่เลิฟ
- Genre: Romantic comedy; Family drama
- Directed by: Ekkasit Trakulkasemsuk; Pantip Vibultham
- Starring: Kathaleeya McIntosh; Luke Ishikawa Plowden; Tawan Vihokratana; Atthaphan Phunsawat; Worranit Thawornwong; Sutatta Udomsilp; Rachanun Mahawan
- Country of origin: Thailand
- Original language: Thai
- No. of episodes: 18

Production
- Running time: 47 minutes
- Production companies: GMMTV; Keng Kwang Kang Waisai

Original release
- Network: GMM 25; Viu
- Release: 10 October – 6 December 2022

The Three GentleBros (Thai: The Three GentleBros; RTGS: Khu Thae Mae Mai Love) is a Thai television series starring Kathaleeya McIntosh (Mam), Luke Ishikawa Plowden, Tawan Vihokratana (Tay), Atthaphan Phunsawat (Gun), Worranit Thawornwong (Mook), Sutatta Udomsilp (Punpun), and Rachanun Mahawan (Film).

Directed by Ekkasit Trakulkasemsuk (Koo) alongside Pantip Vibultham (Bo) and produced by GMMTV together with Keng Kwang Kang Waisai, it was announced as one of the television series of GMMTV for 2022 during their "GMMTV2022: BORDERLESS" event held on December 1, 2021. It officially premiered on GMM 25 and Viu on October 10, and ran until December 6, 2022.

== Synopsis ==
The story follows Itch, a young man abandoned by his biological mother as a child and raised under the suffocating control of his father and stepmother. Unable to make his own choices, his trajectory changes when he accidentally becomes involved with his father's mistress. Although she initially treats him coldly, everything changes when Itch desperately tries to keep her from leaving, triggering a complex dynamic that challenges his lack of freedom.

Meanwhile, Thames desperately wants a romantic partner who is the complete opposite of his overbearing mother. He crosses paths with Nueng, a fiery young woman who frequently clashes with his mother, initially making Thames fear that she might be just like her. However, as he gets to know her deeper layers, he realizes that he has already unintentionally given her his heart.

The youngest brother, Arty, grew up closely copying his mother's traits, making him a prime target for her matchmaking schemes. In an attempt to reject an arranged relationship with his mother's friend's daughter, Arty hires View, someone completely outside their social circle, to act as his fake partner. Though he believes he can end the act whenever he wants, Arty soon finds himself genuinely falling in love with View.

== Cast and characters ==
=== Main ===
- Kathaleeya McIntosh (Mam) as Pimphattra "Pim" (Itch, Thames, and Arty's mother)
- Luke Ishikawa Plowden as Itchaya "Itch"
- Tawan Vihokratana (Tay) as Thevis "Thames"
- Atthaphan Phunsawat (Gun) as Ashira "Arty"
- Worranit Thawornwong (Mook) as Kaewklao
- Sutatta Udomsilp (Punpun) as Nuengnaret "Nueng"
- Rachanun Mahawan (Film) as Nareeya "View"

=== Supporting ===
- Supoj Janjareonborn (Lift) as Anthony (Itch's father)
- Penpetch Benyakul (Jab) as Phat (Thames's father)
- Amarin Nitibhon (Am) as Atsadin (Arty's father)
- Sarucha Petchroj (Yingying) as Kan (Kaewklao' sister)
- Juthapich Indrajundra (Jamie) as Nichapha "Pha"
- Chatchawit Techarukpong (Victor) as Chakrit "Krit"
- Ploynira Hiruntaveesin (Kapook) as Vivi
- Tharatorn Jantharaworakarn (Boom) as Win
- Wanwimol Jaenasavamethee (June) as Rata
- Kasidet Plookphol (Book) as Sun
- Benyapa Jeenprasom (View) as Namwa (View's sister)
- Bhasidi Petchsutee (Lookjun) as Eri
- Preeyaphat Lawsuwansiri (Earn) as Pim
- Thanik Kamontharanon (Pawin) as Bam
- Chakrabandhu Na Ayudhya (Claudia) as Kanokchat (Itch's stepmother)
- Pattamawan Kaomulkadee (Yui) as Napha (Kaewklao's mother)
- Wae Soul as Ramai (Eri's mother)
- Paramej Noiam (Plai) as Karan (Nueng's father)
- Deejai Dididi (Pattai) as Waew (View's mother)

=== Guest ===
- Orapan Phongmaykin (Aya) as Onnie (Ep. 13)
- Jirapat Uttamanan (Khunnote) as writer

== Soundtrack ==
Song title	Artist	Ref.
"แม่ไม่ชอบ แต่ฉันชอบ (Be Mine)"	Fluke Gawin	
"แม่ไม่ชอบ แต่ฉันชอบ (Be Mine)"	Mook Worranit	
