= Bhasidi Petchsutee =

Thai actress and model (born 1998)

- ภาสิดี เพชรสุธี
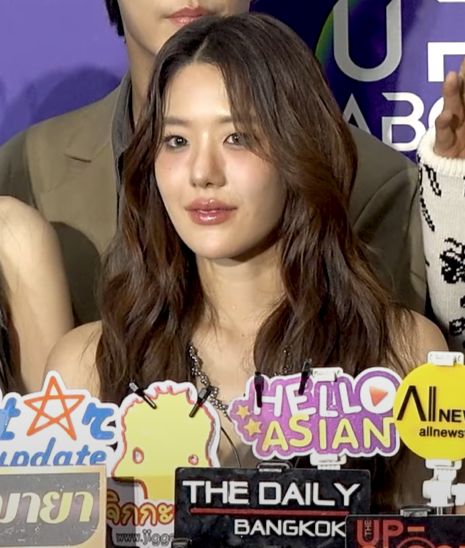
- Bhasidi in April 2024
- Born: 2 February 1998 (age 28); Bangkok, Thailand
- Other name: Lookjun
- Education: Silpakorn University
- Occupations: Actress; Model
- Years active: 2021–present
- Agent: GMMTV (2021–2024)
- Notable work: Namo in Not Me; Alice in Astrophile; Namcheum in Only Friends
- Height: 160 cm (5 ft 3 in)

Bhasidi Petchsutee (Thai: ภาสิดี เพชรสุธี; born 2 February 1998), nicknamed Lookjun (Thai: ลูกจัน), is a Thai actress and model. She is known for her roles in Namo in Not Me (2021), Alice in Astrophile (2022), Tian in A Boss and a Babe (2023), and Namcheum in Only Friends (2023).

== Early life and education ==
Bhasidi was born in Bangkok, Thailand. She is currently studying Fashion Design at Silpakorn University.

== Career ==
Bhasidi worked as a model before joining GMMTV. During the GMMTV 2022: Bordless press event in late 2021, Bhasidi was announced as a rookie artist under the production and talent agency GMMTV. Since her debut, she has played supporting roles within the industry such as Namo in Not Me, Alice in Astrophile, Tian in A Boss and a Babe, and Pang in Good Old Days: Story 5 - Love Wins. She landed her first lead role in the show The Jungle, which aired in July 2023. In 2024, Bhasidi decided to terminate her contracts with GMMTV.

== Personal life ==
Bhasidi owns two pet rabbits named Larry and Panini. She has been dating fellow GMMTV artist Phanuroj Chalermkijporntavee since 2021.

== Filmography ==
=== Television series ===
Year	Title	Role	Notes	Network	Ref.
2021	Not Me	Namo	Supporting role	GMM25	
2022	Astrophile	Alice	Supporting role	GMM25	
2022	Good Old Days: Story 5: Love Wins	Pang	Supporting role	Disney+ Hotstar	
2022	My Dear Donovan	Parichata (young)	Guest role	GMM25	
2022	The Three GentleBros	Eri	Supporting role	GMM25	
2023	A Boss and a Babe	Tian	Supporting role	GMM25	
2023	The Jungle	Irin	Main role	GMM25	
2023	Only Friends	Namchueam	Supporting role	GMM25	
2023	Cooking Crush	Jane	Supporting role	GMM25	
2024	Summer Night	Ivy	Supporting role	GMM25	
2026	Duang with You	Alice	Supporting role	One 31	
