= Who Are You (Thai TV series) =

2020 Thai television series

- Official series poster
- Thai: Who Are You – เธอคนนั้น คือ ฉันอีกคน
- Genre: Mystery; Drama
- Created by: GMMTV
- Based on: Who Are You: School 2015 by Kim Min-jung and Im Ye-jin
- Directed by: Kanittha Kwunyoo
- Starring: Tipnaree Weerawatnodom; Perawat Sangpotirat; Kay Lertsittichai
- Country of origin: Thailand
- Original language: Thai
- No. of episodes: 18

Production
- Running time: 60 minutes
- Production companies: GMMTV; Nar-ra-tor

Original release
- Network: GMM 25; LINE TV
- Release: 2 May – 28 June 2020

Who Are You (Thai: Who Are You – เธอคนนั้น คือ ฉันอีกคน; Who Are You – Thoe Khon Nan Khue Chan Ik Khon, lit. Who Are You: She Is Another Me) is a 2020 Thai television series starring Tipnaree Weerawatnodom (Namtan), Perawat Sangpotirat (Krist) and Kay Lertsittichai. An adaptation of the South Korean drama Who Are You: School 2015, the series follows a pair of identical twins, one orphaned and constantly suffering from bullying, and the other living a better life with her rich adoptive mother.

Directed by Kanittha Kwunyoo and produced by GMMTV together with Nar-ra-tor, the series was one of the twelve television series for 2020 showcased by GMMTV during their "New & Next" event on 15 October 2019. It premiered on GMM 25 and LINE TV on 2 May 2020, airing on Saturdays and Sundays at 21:30 ICT and 23:00 ICT, respectively. The series concluded on 28 June 2020.

== Synopsis ==
After enduring vicious bullying, orphaned student, Mind (Tipnaree Weerawatnodom), attempts to take her life in hopes of escaping her problems. Miraculously, she survives with the loss of all memory and wakes up with a new life as she takes on the identity of Meen (Tipnaree Weerawatnodom). Mind and Meen couldn't be more different, of course, besides the fact that they are identical twins. Living as Meen, Mind is granted the opportunity to meet Natee (Perawat Sangpotirat), a young swimming athlete who is Meen's close friend, and Gunkan (Kay Lertsittichai), a mischievous handsome boy at the school who later comes to help her recover her lost memories. But, as time passes, unveiling the truth causes her to feel more pain than she had ever experienced.

== Cast and characters ==
=== Main ===
- Tipnaree Weerawatnodom (Namtan) as Meennara Nunnithisopa (Meen) / Manita Euarak (Mind)
- Perawat Sangpotirat (Krist) as Natee (Na)
- Kay Lertsittichai as Gunkan (Gun)

=== Supporting ===
- Ployshompoo Supasap (Jan) as Tida Traiwitsakul
- Harit Cheewagaroon (Sing) as Chaowat (Pete)
- Apichaya Saejung (Ciize) as Leila
- Juthapich Indrajundra (Jamie) as Arisara (Kat)
- Nuttawut Jenmana (Max) as Teacher Q
- Mayurin Pongpudpunth (Kik) as Kwan

Meen's mother

- Alysaya Tsoi (Alice) as Teacher May
- Songsit Roongnophakunsri (Kob) as Korn

Gun's father / Director of Panyasorn College

- Apasiri Nitibhon (Um) as Pacharee

Pete's mother/ President of Parent Association

- Santisuk Promsiri (Noom) as Leng

Natee's father

- Wanwimol Jaenasavamethee (June) as June
- Krittanai Arsalprakit (Nammon) as Damrong (Gus)
- Napasorn Weerayuttvilai (Puimek) as Kannika (Koykaew)
- Kallaya Lertkasemsab (Ngek) as Darunee

Tida's mother

- Surasak Chaiyaat (Noo) as Thanadol

Tida's father

- Panadda Wongphudee (Boom) as Mew

Gun's mother

- Kittipat Chalaragse (Golf) as Teacher An
- Thanaboon Wanlopsirinun (Na) as Coach James

Natee's swimming coach

- Lapisara Intarasut (Apple) as Ning

== Soundtracks ==
Song title	Romanized title	Artist	Ref.
ลืมว่าต้องลืม	Luem Wa Tong Luem (Forget to Forget)	Getsunova	
อยากถูกมองด้วยแววตาแบบนั้น	Yark Took Mong Duay Waew Tar Bap Nan	Sarunchana Apisamaimongkol (Aye)	
คนเดิมที่ไม่เหมือนเดิม	Kon Derm Tee Mai Meuan Derm	Getsunova	

== Reception ==
=== Review ===
The Thai drama series was much more better than the Original Korean Drama Series having 2 more episodes. While Kim So Hyun starred Original Korean Drama Series ending was a bit hurried one, the Thai adaptation had a well explained ending.

=== Thailand television ratings ===
- In the table below, the blue number represents the lowest ratings and the red number represents the highest ratings.

Episode No.	Timeslot (UTC+07:00)	Air date	Average audience share	Ref.
1	Saturday 9:30 pm	2 May 2020	0.390%	
2	Sunday 9:30 pm	3 May 2020	0.499%	
3	Saturday 9:30 pm	9 May 2020	0.489%	
4	Sunday 9:30 pm	10 May 2020	0.340%	
5	Saturday 9:30 pm	16 May 2020	0.462%	
6	Sunday 9:30 pm	17 May 2020	0.498%	
7	Saturday 9:30 pm	23 May 2020	0.346%	
8	Sunday 9:30 pm	24 May 2020	0.411%	
9	Saturday 9:30 pm	30 May 2020	0.363%	
10	Sunday 9:30 pm	31 May 2020	0.363%	
11	Saturday 9:30 pm	6 June 2020	0.396%	
12	Sunday 9:30 pm	7 June 2020	0.555%	
13	Saturday 9:30 pm	13 June 2020	0.664%	
14	Sunday 9:30 pm	14 June 2020	0.451%	
15	Saturday 9:30 pm	20 June 2020	0.757%	
16	Sunday 9:30 pm	21 June 2020	0.627%	
17	Saturday 9:30 pm	27 June 2020	0.670%	
18	Sunday 9:30 pm	28 June 2020	0.682%	
Average			0.498% ^{1}	

^1 Based on the average audience share per episode.

== Awards and nominations ==
Award	Year	Category	Recipient(s) and nominee(s)	Result	Ref.
Asian Academy Creative Awards	2020	Best Drama Series	Who Are You	Nominated	
Asian Television Awards	2021	Best Actress in a Leading Role	Tipnaree Weerawatnodom	Nominated	
Asian Television Awards	2021	Best Actress in a Supporting Role	Ployshompoo Supasap	Nominated	
Zoomdara Awards	2020	Drama Actor	Perawat Sangpotirat	Won	
Zoomdara Awards	2020	Best Actress in a Villain Role	Ployshompoo Supasap	Won	
Zoomdara Awards	2020	Rising Star Actress	Tipnaree Weerawatnodom	Won	

== Broadcast ==
- In the Philippines, the series was acquired by GMA Network, together with My Dear Donovan, Blacklist, The Gifted series, Senophile, and Beauty and the Guy. The series is slated to air this September 2023.
- The series was acquired by Japan through Fuji TV.
- YouTube Originals aired this Drama in India & rest of South Asia through GMA Network YouTube Channel.
