= Tipnaree Weerawatnodom =

Thai actress and host (born 1996)

- ทิพนารี วีรวัฒโนดม
- Tipnaree in September 2026
- Born: Narumon Weerawatnodom; 1 July 1996 (age 30); Phra Nakhon Si Ayutthaya, Thailand
- Other names: Namtan (น้ำตาล), Tan (ตาล), NT/Noto (นท)
- Education: Srinakharinwirot University; Faculty of Fine Arts (M.F.A.)
- Occupations: Actress; television host
- Years active: 2013–present
- Agent: GMMTV
- Known for: Boom in Friend Zone; Meen/Mind in Who Are You; Pam in My Dear Donovan; Ai-oon/Oaboom in Pluto; Prim in Girl Rules
- Height: 169 cm (5 ft 7 in)
- Relatives: Narubadin Weerawatnodom (brother)
- Website: https://www.instagram.com/namtan.tipnaree

Tipnaree Weerawatnodom (Thai: ทิพนารี วีรวัฒโนดม, RTGS: Thipnari Wirawatnodom; born 1 July 1996), nicknamed Namtan (Thai: น้ำตาล, lit. 'Sugar'), is a Thai actress, singer, model and television host. She began her career in 2013 as a co-host of the variety show Strawberry Krubcake. She later gained widespread recognition for her roles in several television series, notably as Boom in Friend Zone (2018) and its sequel Friend Zone 2: Dangerous Area (2020), as well as her dual roles as Meen and Mind in Who Are You (2020). Her career progressed with prominent roles in Law-less (2024) and her portrayal of the twin characters Ai-oon and Oaboom in the girls' love series Pluto (2024).

== Early life and education ==
Born in Phra Nakhon Si Ayutthaya Province, Thailand, as Narumon Weerawatnodom, she completed her secondary education at Chomsurang Upatham School. In 2018, she graduated with a bachelor's degree in Fine Arts, majoring in acting and directing, from Srinakharinwirot University. She later earned her master's degree in Performing Arts from the same institution in 2024.

== Career ==
Tipnaree entered the entertainment industry in 2013 as a regular co-host on the youth variety show Strawberry Krubcake alongside future fellow GMMTV artists Bright Vachirawit Chivaaree and Pronpiphat Pattanasettanon. She subsequently transitioned to acting, taking on main and supporting roles in GMMTV television series including U-Prince (2016–2017), Slam Dance (2017), My Dear Loser (2017), Friend Zone (2018) and Love Beyond Frontier (2019).

In 2020, Tipnaree earned critical praise for portraying the twin characters Meen and Mind in the drama Who Are You. The same year, she reprised her role as Boom in Friend Zone 2: Dangerous Area and starred as Pon in Romantic Blue: The Series. In 2022, she starred alongside Luke Ishikawa Plowden in the romantic comedy My Dear Donovan (2022). She achieved further critical and commercial success in 2024 by portraying twin sisters Ai-oon and Oaboom in the girls' love television series Pluto (2024), alongside Rachanun Mahawan.

Following the success of Pluto, Tipnaree expanded her presence in the fashion industry. In 2025, she was named a brand friend of COS Thailand and FRED Jewelry. She also attended the COS Autumn/Winter 2025 show at New York Fashion Week with Zee Pruk Panich and the Polo Ralph Lauren Spring/Summer 2026 presentation in Paris alongside her on-screen partner, Film Rachanun. Her profile grew significantly through her collaboration with Prada. After attending several international shows for the fashion house, she was officially named Prada's second Thai female brand ambassador in September 2026. She made her debut in this role at Milan Fashion Week Spring/Summer 2027 alongside fellow ambassador Metawin Opas-iamkajorn, with the pair also becoming the first Thai artists to be invited to Vogue World and sit in the front row. Additionally, she was appointed Thailand's first Emporio Armani Fragrance Ambassador for the "Power of You" campaign and brand ambassador for FitFlop.

In 2026, Tipnaree starred in the series Girl Rules alongside Rachanun, featuring as part of an ensemble cast that also includes Pansa Vosbein, Pattranite Limpatiyakorn, Benyapa Jeenprasom, and Rattanawadee Wongthong. She is also scheduled to appear in a supporting role in the boys' love series The Invisible Dragon and will reteam with Rachanun for the upcoming girls' love series Her. Following online criticism regarding the representation of transgender themes in the initial trailer for Her, Tipnaree stated she welcomed constructive feedback and expressed confidence that the production team would deliver a balanced narrative.

== Personal life ==
Tipnaree is the younger sister of professional footballer Narubadin Weerawatnodom.

She is openly queer and pansexual. In 2025, she publicly shared that she has been in relationships with both men and women, and experiences attraction regardless of gender identity.

== Filmography ==
=== Television series ===
Key
†	Denotes television productions that have not yet been released

Year	Title	Role	Notes	Ref.
2013	The Beginning	Tan	Main role	
2016	U-Prince:The Lovely Geologist	Bell	Supporting role	
2016	Little Big Dream	Mo	Supporting role	
2016	U-Prince: The Foxy Pilot	Bell	Guest role	
2017	U-Prince: The Playful Comm-Arts	Bell	Guest role	
2017	Senior Secret Love: Puppy Honey 2	Friend	Supporting role	
2017	U-Prince: The Crazy Artist	Bell	Supporting role	
2017	U-Prince: Badly Politics	Bell	Supporting role	
2017	Slam Dance	Woon	Supporting role	
2017	U-Prince:The Ambitious Boss	Bell	Supporting role	
2017	My Dear Loser: Edge of 17	On	Guest role	
2017	Love Songs Love Series: Oh	Fon	Main role	
2017	My Dear Loser: Monster Romance	On	Supporting role	
2017	My Dear Loser: Happy Ever After	On	Guest role	
2018	Wake Up Ladies: The Series	Tata	Main role	
2018	Friend Zone	Boom	Main role	
2019	Wolf	Pin	Guest role	
2019	Love Beyond Frontier	Pat	Main role	
2019	A Gift For Whom You Hate	Bell	Main role	
2020	Who Are You	Meen / Mind	Main role	
2020	The Gifted: Graduation	Nayanate Jiraarpa (Nate) (young)	Guest role	
2020	Friend Zone 2: Dangerous Area	Boom	Main role	
2020	Wake Up Ladies: Very Complicated	Tata	Main role	
2020	Romantic Blue: The Series	Sutatinee Supaworakran (Pon)	Main role	
2021	The Player	Gewalin Theerachaichan (Giwi)	Main role	
2022	Drag, I Love You	Paranee	Supporting role	
2022	Mongkut Karma	Ning	Supporting role	
2022	My Dear Donovan	Pemanee (Pam)	Main role	
2022	Good Old Days: Story 3: Road to Regret	Kai	Main role	
2022	Mama Gogo	Kiwi	Guest role	
2022	Vice Versa	Paeng Piyada	Supporting role	
2023	Midnight Museum	June	Supporting role	
2023	UMG (Unidentified Mysterious Girlfriend)	Fahsai	Main role	
2023	Enigma	Anya Tiwa-asan	Guest role (Ep 4)	
2023	Last Twilight	Porjai	Supporting role	
2024	Ploy's Yearbook	Ploypang	Main role	
2024	Law-less	Phraochanok	Main role	
2024	Pluto	Ai-oon / Oaboom Ingsamug	Main role	
2025	Break Up Service	Cherry	Guest role	
2025	Enigma Black Stage	Anya Tiwa-asan	Supporting role	
2025	That Summer	Princess Anya	Supporting role	
2026	Girl Rules	Pariyakorn Roongruengsook (Prim)	Main role	
2026	Moonshadow	Elle	Supporting role	
TBA	Her †	Arpo	Main role	
TBA	Lost in Your Eyes †	Plum	Main role	
TBA	The Invisible Dragon †	Yok	Supporting role	

=== Television show ===
Year	Title	Network	Notes	Ref.
2013–2015	Strawberry Krubcake	Channel 3		
2017–2019	#TEAMGIRL	GMM 25		
2018	ก็กูทําไม่เป็น	Line TV	Ep 7	
2019	School Rangers	GMM 25	Ep 63–64, 97–101	
2019	Tred Tray Fest with Tay Tawan	GMMTV	Ep 11	
2020	School Rangers	GMM 25	Ep 118–119, 131–132, 141–142, 149–150	
2020	Talk with Toey	GMM 25	Ep 19, 47	
2020	Arm Share	GMMTV	Ep 50, 52	
2020	Brand's Summer Camp	GMMTV		
2021	School Rangers	GMM 25	Ep 155–156	
2021	กระหายเล่า Krahai Lao	GMMTV	Ep 2, 17	
2021	Arm Share	GMMTV	Ep 65, 67	
2021	Isuzu Max Challenge	GMMTV	Ep 3–4	
2022	School Rangers	GMM 25	Ep 216–217, 231–232, 261	
2022	Arm Share	GMMTV	Ep 99–100, 111–112, 114	
2022	รุ่นนี้ต้องรอด Young Survivors	GMMTV	Ep 5	
2022	Talk with Toeys	GMM 25	Ep 70	
2023	Project Alpha Special	GMM 25		
2023	Arm Share	GMMTV	Ep 116, 126, 139–141	
2023	Project Alpha	GMM 25	Ep 7	
2023	Once Upon a Time with Tay Tawan by Lactasoy	GMMTV	Ep 6	
2023	School Rangers	GMM 25	Ep 261, 265–266, 294–295	
2023	Laneige Let It Glow ซีนป่วนก๊วนผิวปัง	Laneige Thailand		
2023	A Free Meal Chance – May Pepsi Treat You?	GMMTV	Ep 4	
2023	Laneige Let It Go ทริปป่วน ก๊วนผิวปัง	GMMTV		
2023	Save 100K – แสบ Save แสน	GMMTV		
2024	Laneige Let It Glow ซีนป่วนก๊วนผิวปัง SS2	Laneige Thailand		
2024	School Rangers	GMMTV	Ep 7–8, 17, 24, 27, 29	
2024	Arm Share	GMMTV	Ep 150, 168	
2024	Pepsi Friend Feast Guide with Gemini-Fourth	GMMTV	Ep 2, 12	
2024	High Season แคมป์ซ่าฮาทุกฤดู	GMMTV	Ep 3–7	
2024	Laneige Let It Go ทริปป่วน ก๊วนผิวปัง Season 2	GMMTV		
2024	EMS Earth-Mix Space Special	GMMTV	Ep 3	
2024	Laneige Let It Glow ซีนป่วนก๊วนผิวปัง Season 3	Laneige Thailand		
2024	หัวท้ายตายก่อน The First and Last Thailand	Workpoint TV	Ep 143	
2024	Face Off แฝดคนละฝา	Workpoint TV	3 December 2024 (Ep 47)	
2025	High Season แคมป์ซ่าฮาทุกฤดู Season 3 Winter	One 31, GMMTV	Ep 1–4	
2025	Bestie Tasty	GMMTV	Ep 3	
2025	The Unexpected Trip ไปไม่หวัง ปังไม่ไหว by Nivea	GMMTV	Ep 1–3	
2025	FriendEd 101	GMMTV	Ep 4	
2025	Face Off แฝดคนละฝา	Workpoint TV	15 July 2025 (Ep 79), 9 December 2025 (Ep 100)	
2025	Garnier วิทย์ตี้ Academy	GMMTV	Ep 2	
2025	Arm Share	GMMTV	Ep 183	
2025	The Wall Song	Workpoint TV	Ep 265	
2025	Pepsi Friend Feast Guide with Gemini-Fourth Season 2	GMMTV	Ep 9	
2026	Running Man Thailand	iQIYI	Ep 2	
2026	Based on 2 Stories	GMMTV	Ep 7	
2026	EAT By PEPSI มิตรชวนกิน	GMMTV	Ep 1	
2026	Preawpak	Preawpakth YouTube	Ep 23	
2026	CLUB D: Drive Well, Everything Goes Well	Channel 3	Ep 1 - 10	
2026	TRENDTOร่างทอง	GMMTV	Ep 11	
2026	GARNIER วิทย์ตี้ Academy Field Trip	GMMTV	Ep 2	

== Discography ==
=== Singles ===
==== Collaborations ====
Year	Title	Notes	Ref.
2025	"ฤดูของเรา (Blooming Blossom)" (with Film, Milk, Love, Emi, Bonnie, June, Mewnich, View, Mim)	Blush Blossom Fan Fest	

==== Soundtrack appearances ====
Year	Title	Album	Label	Ref.
2022	"ถ้าเราไม่รู้จักกัน (Pam Version)"	My Dear Donovan OST	GMMTV Records	
2024	"เรื่องเล่าของเจ้าหญิง (A Princess' Tale)" with Film Rachanun	Pluto OST	GMMTV Records	
2024	"พลูโต (Pluto)" with Film Rachanun	Pluto OST	GMMTV Records	
2024	"นิยายเรื่องเธอ (Your Story)"	Pluto OST	GMMTV Records	
2024	"Somewhere Only We Know"	Pluto OST	GMMTV Records	
2026	"Girl Rules" with Film Rachanun, Milk Pansa, Love Pattranite, View Benyapa, Mim Rattanawadee	Girl Rules OST	GMMTV Records	
2026	"Favorite Toxic" with Film Rachanun	Girl Rules OST	GMMTV Records	

== Fan meetings ==
Title	Date	Venue	Notes	Ref.
Last Twilight Final EP. Fan Meeting	26 January 2024	Siam Pavalai Royal Grand Theater, Siam Paragon	With Last Twilight cast	
Last Twilight New Dawn Live On Stage	30 March 2024	Union Hall, Union Mall	With Last Twilight cast	
Pluto Final EP. Fan Meeting	4 January 2025	Siam Pavalai Royal Grand Theater, Siam Paragon	With Pluto cast	
GMMTV Fan Day 16 in Cambodia	26 January 2025	Aeon Mall Sen Sok City, Phnom Penh	With Film	
Namtan 1st Fan Meeting in Nanning	15 February 2025	Nanning International Convention and Exhibition Center, Nanning, China	—N/a	
Namtan Film Princess's Tale Fan Meeting	8–9 March 2025	MCC Hall, The Mall Lifestore Bangkapi, Bangkok	With Film	
My Muses - NamtanFilm 1st Fanmeeting in Vietnam	29 March 2025	Ben Thanh Theater, Ho Chi Minh City	With Film	
Namtan Fan Meeting in Fuzhou	12 April 2025	Strait Culture and Art Centre Opera House, Fuzhou, China	—N/a	
NamtanFilm Fanmeeting in Macao	20 April 2025	The Venetian Theatre, Macau	With Film	
The 25th Thai Festival Tokyo 2025 Special Fanmeeting	9 May 2025	New Pier Hall, Tokyo	With Film	
Sweet Journey - Namtan Fan Appreciation Party	31 May 2025	Hangzhou, China	—N/a	
Namtan Film 1st Fan Meeting in Manila	18 July 2025	UP Theater, Manila, Philippines	With Film	
NamtanFilm 1st Fanmeeting in Hong Kong	10 August 2025	AXA Dreamland, Go Park, Hong Kong	With Film	
NamtanFilm 1st Fan Meeting in Singapore	1 November 2025	GVmax, VivoCity	With Film	
NamtanFilm Fan Meeting in Taipei	18 January 2026	Zepp New Taipei	With Film	
GMMTV Fan Day 30 in Osaka	15 March 2026	Cool Japan Park Osaka WW Hall	With Film	
NamtanFilm Fan Meeting in Hong Kong 2026	5 April 2026	AXA Dreamland, Go Park	With Film	
NamtanFilm 1st Fan Meeting in Madrid	21 June 2026	La Estación - Gran Teatro CaixaBank Príncipe Pio	With Film	
Girl Rules Fan Meeting in Seoul	4 July 2026	Kwangwoon University Donghae Culture Art Center	With Girl Rules cast	
Girl Rules Fan Meeting in Singapore	1 August 2026	D'Marquee, Downtown East	With Girl Rules cast	
Girl Rules Fan Meeting in Macau	8 August 2026	Macau Fisherman's Wharf Convention and Exhibition Center	With Girl Rules cast	
Girl Rules Fan Meeting in Taipei	15 August 2026	NCCU Art & Culture Center, Auditorium	With Girl Rules cast	
Girl Rules Fan Meeting in Manila	3 October 2026	SMX Convention Center Manila	With Girl Rules cast	
Double Trouble with Lunar: NamtanFilm & Lunar Fan Meeting in Ho Chi Minh City	13 December 2026	C30 Hoa Binh Stage, Ho Chi Minh City	With Film	
NamtanFilm Fan Meeting in Seoul	13 February 2027	Cube Convention Center	With Film	

== Concerts ==
Title	Date	Venue	Notes	Ref.
Blush Blossom Fan Fest	28–29 June 2025	Union Hall, Union Mall	With Film, Milk, Love, Emi, Bonnie, View, Mim, June, Mewnich	
Blush Blossom Fan Fest in Macau	30 November 2025	Fisherman's Wharf Convention & Exhibition Center	With Film, Milk, Love, Emi, Bonnie, View, Mim, June, Mewnich	
Toey Fair Concert #เทยแฟร์69	3 March 2026	Union Hall, Union Mall	With Pompam, Godji, Golf, Jennie	
Blush Blossom Fan Fest: Midnight Bloom	13–14 June 2026	BITEC Live	With Film, Milk, Love, Emi, Bonnie, View, Mim, Jan, JingJing, June, Mewnich, Pahn, Fond, Kapook, Ciize	
Blush Blossom Fan Fest: Midnight Bloom in Macau	24 October 2026	Fisherman's Wharf Convention & Exhibition Center	With Film, Milk, Love, Emi, Bonnie, View, Mim, Jan, JingJing, Pahn, Fond, Kapook, Ciize	
Blush Blossom Fan Fest: Midnight Bloom in Kaohsiung	7 November 2026	Kaohsiung Music Center	With Film, Milk, Love, Emi, Bonnie, View, Mim, Jan, JingJing, Pahn, Fond, Kapook, Ciize	
NamtanFilm Glamorous Fancon	13–14 November 2026	Union Hall, Union Mall	With Film	
PEBACA Legacy Fam Concert	30–31 January 2027	BITEC LIVE	With Krist, Singto, Off, Gun, Tay, New, Nanon, Gawin, Nani, JingJing, Prem, Sky, Bonnie, Phuwin	

== Awards and nominations ==
Key
†	Indicates non-competitive categories

Award nominations for Tipnaree Weerawatnodom
Year	Award	Category	Nominee(s)	Result	Ref.
2019	Council of Creative Artists	Outstanding Female Artist †		Won	
2020	Kazz Awards 2020	Hottest Female Teenage of the Year		Nominated	
2020	Zoomdara Awards	Rising Star Actress	Who Are You	Won	
2021	25th Asian Television Awards	Best Actress in a Leading Role	Who Are You	Nominated	
2021	Kazz Awards 2021	Popular Female Teenage Award		Nominated	
2021	Siam Series Awards	Most Popular Supporting Actress	Friend Zone 2: Dangerous Area	Nominated	
2024	29th Asian Television Awards	Best Actress in a Supporting Role	Last Twilight	Nominated	
2025	Thailand Y Content Awards 2024	Couple of the Year with Film Rachanun	Pluto	Nominated	
2025	Seoul International Drama Awards (SDA)	Outstanding Asian Star (Thailand)	Pluto	Nominated	
2025	Y Entertain Awards 2025	Leading Girls' Love Star of the Year	Pluto	Won	
2025	Y Entertain Awards 2025	Princess of Girls' Love	Pluto	Won	
2025	Y Entertain Awards 2025	Y Couple of The Year with Film Rachanun	Pluto	Nominated	
2025	Maya TV Awards 2025	Female Couple of the Year with Film Rachanun	Pluto	Nominated	
2025	HOWE Awards 2025	Hottest Actress Award	Pluto	Won	
2026	Japan Expo Thailand Award 2026	Actress Award with Film Rachanun	Pluto	Won	
2026	Y Universe Awards 2025	Best Leading Actress (Jury Award)	Pluto	Nominated	
2026	Y Universe Awards 2025	Best Leading Role (Popular Vote)	Pluto	Nominated	
2026	Y Universe Awards 2025	The Best Couple with Film Rachanun	Pluto	Won	
2026	Thairath Awards 2025	Best GL of the Year with Film Rachanun	Pluto	Nominated	
2026	Sanook Top of the Year 2025	Rising Female Couple with Film Rachanun	Pluto	Nominated	
2026	Seoul International Drama Awards	Outstanding Asian Star (Thailand)	Girl Rules, Enigma Black Stage	Nominated	
2026	#100List Social Club 2026	Kols & Influencer †		Won	
2026	Feed x Khaosod Awards 2026	Best Chemistry of the Year with Film Rachanun	Girl Rules	Nominated	
2026	Asian Academy Creative Awards 2026	Best Actress in a Supporting Role; National (Thailand)	Enigma Black Stage	Won	
2026	Asian Academy Creative Awards 2026	Best Actress in a Supporting Role; Regional (Asia)	Enigma Black Stage	Pending	
2026	31st Asian Televison Awards	Best Actress in a Supporting Role	Enigma Black Stage	Nominated	
