= Luke Ishikawa Plowden =

American actor and model (born 1995)

- ลุค อิชิคาว่า พลาวเด้น
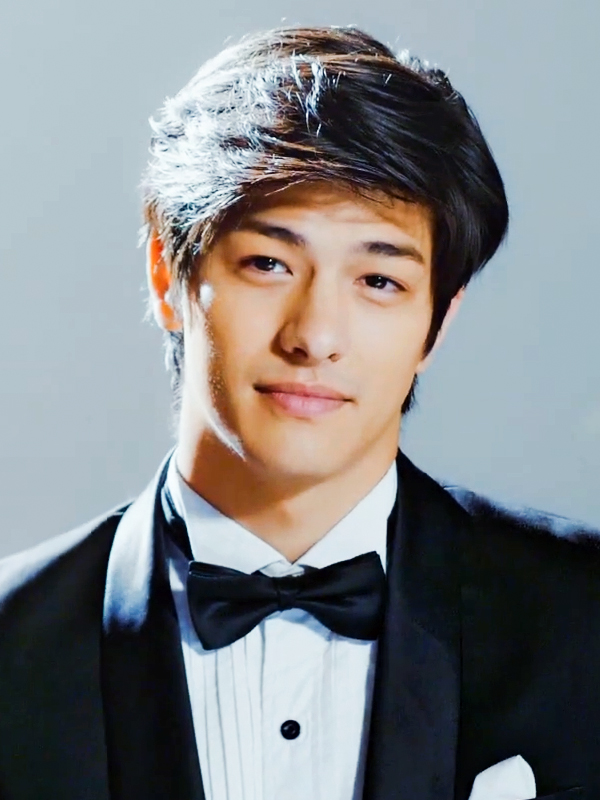
- Plowden in February 2019
- Born: September 13, 1995 (age 31); Washington, Pennsylvania, U.S.
- Education: George Washington University
- Occupation: Actor
- Years active: 2019–present
- Agent: GMMTV (2019–2025)
- Known for: Oh My Boss; My Dear Donovan

Luke Ishikawa Plowden (born September 13, 1995), is an American actor based in Thailand. He is best known for his leading roles in Oh My Boss (2021), My Dear Donovan (2022), and The Three GentleBros (2022).

== Early life ==
Plowden was born in Washington, Pennsylvania to a Japanese mother and an American-Thai father. He has an older sister. He received his bachelor's degree from George Washington University in 2017.

== Career ==
He began his entertainment career as a model in 2017, after being scouted by an international modeling agency. He then got his first modeling job in Thailand, so he moved there from the United States.

In 2018, he was named as one of CLEO Thailand's 50 Most Eligible Bachelors of 2018. He later signed with GMMTV and his first performance was a guest role in the series Wolf (2019).

He later rose to fame for playing the lead role of Akitsuki Koji on the drama series Oh My Boss (2021), alongside Worranit Thawornwong. He also gained wider recognition for starring in the romantic comedy series My Dear Donovan (2022), alongside Tipnaree Weerawatnodom.

In September 2025, he announced his departure from GMMTV on his social media accounts.

== Filmography ==
=== Film ===
Year	Title	Role	Notes	Ref.
2021	Undefeated	Ren	Short film for Free Fire Thailand	
2023	Slyth: The Hunt Saga	Name	Main role	

=== Television ===
Year	Title	Role	Channel	Notes	Ref.
2019	Wolf	Ken	One31	Guest role	
2020	Wake Up Ladies: Very Complicated	Jeff	GMM25	Supporting role	
2021	Nabi, My Stepdarling	"Pong" Pongpop	GMM25	Supporting role	
2021	Oh My Boss	Akitsuki Koji	GMM25	Main role	
2021	F4 Thailand: Boys Over Flowers	Dominique Shun	GMM25	Guest role	
2022	Drag, I Love You	Prabsuek	GMM25	Main role	
2022	My Dear Donovan	Donovan "Dino" McDaniel	GMM25	Main role	
2022	The Three GentleBros	"Itch" Itchaya Prapavisanu	GMM25	Main role	
2023	The Jungle	Nathee	GMM25	Main role	
2023	Faceless Love	Chanon	GMM25	Main role	
2024	Wandee Goodday	Sasaki	GMM25	Supporting role	
2025	Hide & Sis	Arch	GMM25	Supporting role	
2026	Love Destiny	Constantine Phaulkon / Chao Phraya Wichayen	Channel 3 HD	Supporting role	

== Discography ==
=== Soundtrack appearances ===
Year	Title	Label	Ref.
2022	"So Hot" (My Dear Donovan OST)	GMMTV Records	
2023	"Beast Inside" (The Jungle OST) with Krist Perawat, Nanon Korapat, Off Jumpol, Lee Thanat	GMMTV Records	
2023	"รักเธอจนมากพอ (Can’t have you)" (The Jungle OST)	GMMTV Records	
