= Girl Rules =

2026 Thai television series

- Official series poster
- Thai: กฎหลัก…ห้ามรักเธอ
- Genre: Drama; Romance; Girls' love
- Screenplay by: Tichakorn Phukhaotung; Athima Iamathikhom; Nuttamon Yimyam; Shanya Jiwachotkamjorn; Kanokphan Ornrattanasakul; Issaraporn Kuntisuk; Irene Insot
- Directed by: Tichakorn Phukhaotung
- Starring: Tipnaree Weerawatnodom; Rachanun Mahawan; Pansa Vosbein; Pattranite Limpatiyakorn; Benyapa Jeenprasom; Rattanawadee Wongthong
- Opening theme: "Girl Rules" by Namtan Tipnaree, Film Rachanun, Milk Pansa, Love Pattranite, View Benyapa, Mim Rattanawadee
- Composer: Pure Kanin
- Country of origin: Thailand
- Original language: Thai
- No. of episodes: 12

Production
- Executive producers: Sataporn Panichraksapong; Darapa Choeysanguan
- Producers: Rtnthon Kritsanamontri; Rabob Pokanngaen; Noppharnach Chaiyahwimhon
- Cinematography: Rath Roongrueangtantisook; Surasak Sakunrueang
- Running time: 50-55 minutes
- Production companies: GMMTV; Moongdoo Production

Original release
- Network: GMM 25; YouTube; iQIYI
- Release: 9 March – 1 June 2026

Girl Rules (Thai: กฎหลัก…ห้ามรักเธอ RTGS: Kot Lak… Ham Rak Thoe; lit. 'Main Rule… Don't Love Her') is a 2026 Thai girls' love television series, starring Tipnaree Weerawatnodom (Namtan), Rachanun Mahawan (Film), Pansa Vosbein (Milk), Pattranite Limpatiyakorn (Love), Benyapa Jeenprasom (View) and Rattanawadee Wongthong (Mim). The series premiered on GMM25 on 9 March 2026, airing every Monday at 20:30 ICT. The uncut version was made available for streaming at 21:30 ICT on iQIYI. The series concluded after 12 episodes on 1 June 2026.

Directed by Tichakorn Phukhaotung and produced by GMMTV together with Moongdoo Production, the series was announced at the GMMTV 2025: Riding the Wave event on 26 November 2024.

== Synopsis ==
Behind the dazzling lights of the fashion world lies love, secrets, and tangled relationships filled with chaos and complexity. Prim (Tipnaree Weerawatnodom), a talented director, finds fate playing a cruel joke when she has to work again with Bambi (Rachanun Mahawan), her ex who disappeared without a word. This time, Bambi returns asking to be friends, but the question remains: can two people truly be “just friends” when they still share the same bed? While Prim navigates this old flame, Shasha (Pansa Vosbein), a confident top model, hides a fragile side drawn to Gorya (Pattranite Limpatiyakorn), the stylist who plays hard to get longer than anyone Shasha has ever chased, and the more she is rejected, the more her desire burns hotter with every encounter. Meanwhile, Min (Benyapa Jeenprasom), a producer burdened by life and expectations, stands at a crossroads between marrying her long-term boyfriend and following her own dreams, until she meets Praew (Rattanawadee Wongthong), a bartender who opens her eyes to a kind of love she’s never known before.

Six women. Six hearts. Entangled in emotions too complicated to define. The only rule to protect their hearts is simple: Don’t fall in love with her.

== Cast and characters ==
=== Main ===
- Tipnaree Weerawatnodom (Namtan) as Pariyakorn Roongruengsook (Prim)

A talented director and photographer who is also the founder of "Lady Bird Production", a fashion and media production company she built with her best friend, Min. She's the ex-girlfriend of Bambi who broke up with her because she wants to be prioritized and doesn't want to interfere with Prim's career path. Though they stayed friends, she was left devastated when Bambi disappeared on her birthday.

- Rachanun Mahawan (Film) as Bambi Yanin

A daughter of a famous fashion designer who owns "Yanin". She is appointed as the Project Manager for its new sub-brand "Fiona". She's the ex-girlfriend of Prim whom she broke up initially because she doesn't want to be an obstacle to Prim's career and stayed friends with her. Yet she disappeared on the day of Prim's birthday. She then comes back a year later after missing it to win her back.

- Pansa Vosbein (Milk) as Shasha

A famous model known for her confidence and being a perfectionist, yet struggles with dealing with boundaries. She became the brand ambassador for Bambi's brand. She becomes interested in Gorya, pursuing the stylist with confidence and seeing through Gorya's tough exterior to the loneliness within despite the former's dislike towards her.

- Pattranite Limpatiyakorn (Love) as Gorya

The talented professional freelance stylist but mainly works for Prim and Min's company, who is known to be petite but resilient, unafraid of difficult clients and knows how to set boundaries. She has a likening towards Prim since high school and is determined to pursue her when they crossed paths again as professionals, until Shasha came into the picture and challenges her feelings.

- Benyapa Jeenprasom (View) as Min

The producer and co-owner of "Lady Bird Production", the company she built with Prim, where she handles more on the business side of things. She has a troublesome relationship with her boyfriend. She eventually meets Praew who'll make her life turn around into something she didn't expect.

- Rattanawadee Wongthong (Mim) as Praew

A bartender at a lesbian bar who also knows to do photography. She met Min at the bar where she works at and eventually works as the photographer in Prim & Min's company. She is open about her feelings and becomes the catalyst for Min to break free from her toxic relationship.

=== Supporting ===
- Mintita Wattanakul (Mint) as Ant

The owner of the lesbian bar "Blossom", where Praew works as a bartender and where the girls usually hang out at.

- Alissa Intusmith (Yuyee) as Yanin / Nin

Bambi's mother who is the owner of the brand "Yanin". She has a troublesome relationship with her daughter, believing that she is not good at anything.

- Pattraphus Borattasuwan (Bonnie) as Baipor Roongruengsook

Prim's younger sister who just graduated. She had a crush on Shasha when she worked with her in one of her school projects. She eventually then became an intern at her sister's company.

- Ploynira Hiruntaveesin (Kapook) as Zee

She became Bambi's girlfriend after breaking-up with Prim, but an unfortunate event led to their complete separation.

- Rutricha Phapakithi (Ciize) as Airy

The girl who showed likening towards Prim and applied as an employee on her company, but hides a hidden agenda particularly targeted on Bambi.

- Thasorn Klinnium (Emi) as Krystal (Kris)

A famous singer who was Shasha's ex-girlfriend, where their relationship didn't work out because of their similarities.

== Episodes ==
No.	Title	Original release date
1	"Birthday Girl"	9 March 2026
2	"Jealous Girl"	16 March 2026
3	"Straight Girl"	23 March 2026
4	"Try Girl"	30 March 2026
5	"Past Girl"	6 April 2026
6	"Trouble Girl"	20 April 2026
7	"Trapped Girl"	27 April 2026
8	"Haunted Girl"	4 May 2026
9	"Girls Together"	11 May 2026
10	"Healing Girl"	18 May 2026
11	"Broken Girl"	25 May 2026
12	"Final Girls"	1 June 2026

== Production ==
After the success of MilkLove pairing from television series Bad Buddy (2021) and 23.5 (2024), also NamtanFilm pairing from Pluto (2024), GMMTV announced a new girls' love original series titled Girl Rules during the GMMTV 2025: Riding the Wave event on 26 November 2024 along with the pilot trailer. In addition to the pairing of MilkLove and NamtanFilm, the cast also featured the new pairing ViewMim. Directed by Tichakorn Phukhaotung and produced by GMMTV together with Moongdoo Studio, the series was initially scheduled to air in 2025 but was delayed due to production reasons.

On 10 September 2025, the series' official account shared a photo of the cast gathered for a reading session. On 20 September, the cast (Namtan, Film, View, Mim) gathered for a reading session and the fittings photoshoot. On 25 September, the cast (Namtan, Film, Milk, Love) gathered for a second workshop session and the fittings photoshoot.

Principal photography began on 27 September 2025. Filming initially wrapped up on 21 February 2026. However, director Tichakorn stated that there were still a few scenes left to reshoot. Filming officially wrapped up on 11 March 2026.

== Ratings ==
Girl Rules received positive audience ratings following its premiere. As of June 2026, the series held an IMDb rating of 9.0/10 based on more than 120 user reviews, with several episodes receiving ratings above 9.0/10 on the platform. The series was particularly successful among international viewers through streaming services, including iQIYI and YouTube, and regularly generated online discussion and trending topics on social media. Commentators noted that the show's audience was concentrated on digital platforms rather than conventional television broadcasts, reflecting broader viewing trends for Thai girls' love (GL) productions.

== Book ==
A novel of the same name by Jinatcha Maneesriwong (Baison) was published as a companion to the series. The physical copy was published on 13 October 2025, while its e-book version was published on 17 October 2025 on GMMTV's e-book website.

== Original soundtrack ==
The official soundtrack for Girl Rules features:

Song	Artist(s)	Label	Ref.
"Girl Rules"	Namtan Tipnaree, Film Rachanun, Milk Pansa, Love Pattranite, View Benyapa and Mim Rattanawadee	GMMTV Records	
"Cross the Line"	Milk Pansa and Love Pattranite	GMMTV Records	
"Favorite Toxic"	Namtan Tipnaree and Film Rachanun	GMMTV Records	
"Something New"	View Benyapa and Mim Rattanawadee	GMMTV Records	
"Forever Yours"	Emi Thasorn	GMMTV Records	

== Awards and nominations ==
Year	Award	Category	Nominee(s)	Result	Ref.
2024	HUB Awards 2024	Most Awaited Series of 2025	Girl Rules	Won	
