= Pansa Vosbein =

Thai actress (born 1996)

- พรรษา วอสเบียน
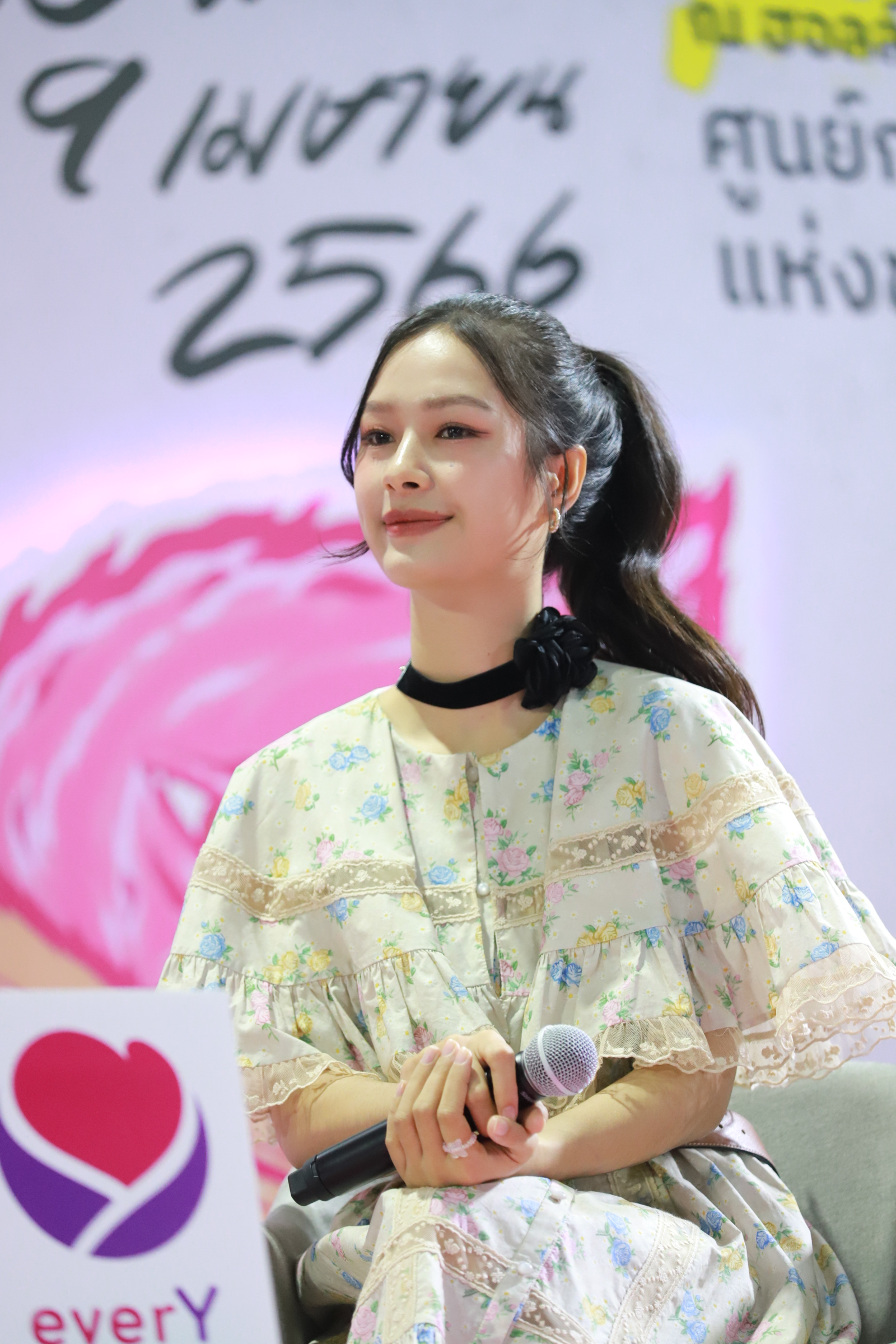
- Pansa in April 2023
- Born: 31 July 1996 (age 30)
- Occupations: Actress; model
- Years active: 2019–present
- Known for: Bad Buddy; F4 Thailand: Boys Over Flowers; 23.5; Whale Store xoxo; Girl Rules
- Height: 170 cm (5 ft 7 in)

Pansa Vosbein (Thai: พรรษา วอสเบียน; born 31 July 1996), nicknamed Milk (Thai: มิ้ลค์), is a Thai actress and model. She first gained recognition for her role in the 2021 television series Bad Buddy and came to further prominence for starring in F4 Thailand: Boys Over Flowers, the Thai adaptation of the Japanese manga Hana Yori Dango. She is also well known for her sapphic roles in girl's love series, including 23.5 (2024), Whale Store xoxo (2025) and Girl Rules (2026).

== Early life and education ==
Pansa was born on 31 July 1996, the fourth of five siblings. She is of mixed Chinese, Danish, Mon, and Thai descent. She graduated with a bachelor's degree from Maejo University in Chiang Mai Province.

== Career ==
=== 2018–2021: Career beginnings and breakthrough ===
Pansa began her career modeling in commercials during her student years. In 2018, she participated in the GSB Gen Campus Star talent search, where she was selected as one of the 23 representatives for Northern Thailand. The following year, she made her acting debut in the music video for Ronnadet Wongsaroj's song "Pen Arai Sak Yang". She transitioned to full-time acting after being scouted by film director Kanittha Kwunyoo, subsequently signing with GMMTV.

Pansa made her screen acting debut under the agency with a sapphic role as Ink in the 2021 series Bad Buddy, starring opposite Pattranite Limpatiyakorn. The on-screen pairing gained significant popularity on social media, establishing them as a prominent partnership. Later that year, Pansa starred as Lita in F4 Thailand: Boys Over Flowers, the Thai television adaptation of the Japanese manga Hana Yori Dango, playing the fiancée of Thyme (portrayed by Vachirawit Chivaaree).

=== 2022–present: Television roles and recognition ===
Following her initial roles, Pansa continued to expand her television career, frequently collaborating with Pattranite in several series, including Vice Versa (2022) and Magic of Zero (2022). The duo later took on leading roles in 23.5 (2024), Whale Store xoxo (2025), and Girl Rules (2026). Their partnership led to fan meetings across Asia, an appearance at the 2nd WTW Global Woman Summit in Shanghai in July 2024, and a joint concert in Bangkok in December 2024.

=== Fashion and endorsements ===
Pansa made her international fashion debut in March 2025 at the Saint Laurent Fall/Winter 2025 fashion show during Paris Fashion Week. In January 2026, she was named a brand ambassador for Yves Saint Laurent (YSL) under creative director Anthony Vaccarello.

She has also achieved notable commercial impact as a fashion influencer. For the Spring/Summer 2026 season, marketing agency Lefty ranked her as the top influencer for Loewe and the fourth highest-earning Thai influencer overall, after she generated $5.09 million in Earned Media Value (EMV). Later that year, her appearance at the Calvin Klein Fall/Winter 2026 show during New York Fashion Week generated $7.8 million in EMV with a 36% engagement rate, ranking her as the top individual talent of the event.

== Filmography ==
=== Film ===
Year	Title	Role	Ref.
2022	Haunted Universities: 2nd Semester		

=== Television series ===
Key
†	Denotes television productions that have not yet been released

Year	Title	Role	Network	Ref.
2021	Bad Buddy	Ink	GMM 25	
2021	F4 Thailand: Boys Over Flowers	Lita	GMM 25	
2022	UMG	Erng	GMM 25	
2022	Oops! Mr. Superstar Hit on Me	Now	GMM 25	
2022	Vice Versa	Som	GMM 25	
2022	Magic of Zero	Ink	GMM 25	
2024	23.5	Ongsa / Earth	GMM 25	
2024	Only Boo!	Net	GMM 25	
2025	Whale Store xoxo	Wan	GMM 25	
2026	Girl Rules	Shasha	GMM 25	
2026	Scarlet Heart Ullavee	Hong Kham	One 31	
TBA	Ditto †	Rafah / Dear / Dream	TBA	
TBA	Cherish †	Fah	TBA	

=== Music video appearances ===
Year	Title	Artist	Ref.
2019	"Pen Arai Sak Yang" (Thai: เป็นอะไรสักอย่าง)	Ronnadet Wongsaroj	
2020	"Love Stranger"	Getsunova and Krist Perawat	
2020	"Hidden Track"	Trinity	
2021	"Missing"	Krist Perawat	
2023	"I Think of You"	Bright Vachirawit	

== Discography ==
=== Singles ===
==== Collaborations ====
Year	Title	Notes	Ref.
2024	"Shot-Feel"	With Love Pattranite	
2025	"Blooming Blossom"	With Love, Namtan, Film, Emi, Bonnie, View, Mim, June, Mewnich	

==== Soundtrack appearances ====
Year	Title	Album	Notes	Ref.
2024	"Tilt"	23.5	With Love Pattranite	
2025	"My Only Champion"	Whale Store xoxo	With Love Pattranite	
2025	"One-Heart Deal"	Whale Store xoxo	With Love Pattranite	
2026	"Girl Rules"	Girl Rules	With Love Pattranite, Namtan Tipnaree, Film Rachanun, View Benyapa, Mim Rattanawadee	
2026	"Cross the Line"	Girl Rules	With Love Pattranite	

== Other performances ==
=== Fan meetings ===
Solo

Title	Date	Place	Ref.
Where My Heart Rests: Milk Fan Meeting in Nanning	8 March 2025	Nanning Wharton International Hotel, Nanning	
Starry River: Milk Fan Meeting in Suzhou	26 July 2025	Suzhou, China	
Whale Dream: Milk Fan Event in Chongqing	20 September 2025	Chongqing, China	
Let's Meet in the Midsummer: Milk Fan Sign in Shanghai	20 June 2026	Shanghai, China	

Joint

Title	Date	Venue	Notes	Ref.
MilkLove 1st Fan Meeting in Hong Kong	2 June 2024	Hong Kong	With Love	
MilkLove 1st Fan Meeting in Taipei	9 June 2024	Taipei, Taiwan	With Love	
Only Boo! Final Ep. Fan Meeting	23 June 2024	SF World Cinema, CentralWorld	With Only Boo! cast	
GMMTV Fan Day 12 in Japan	29 June 2024	Tokyo, Japan	With Love	
GMMTV Fan Day 12 in Japan	30 June 2024	Osaka, Japan	With Love	
MilkLove 1st FanMeeting in Manila	20 July 2024	SM North EDSA Skydome Manila, Philippines	With Love	
GMMTV Fan Day 14 in Vietnam	10 August 2024	Ho Chi Minh City, Vietnam	With Love	
MilkLove 1st Fan Meeting in Macau	24 August 2024	Macau, China	With Love	
GMMTV Fan Day 15 in Singapore	19 October 2024	Singapore	With Love	
MilkLove Fan Meeting in Taipei 2025	11 January 2025	Zepp New Taipei	With Love	
MilkLove Fan Meeting in Hong Kong: Heart Field Blossoms	2 March 2025	AXA Dreamland, Go Park, Hong Kong	With Love	
Whale Store xoxo: First Come, First Love!	25 June 2025	SF World Cinema, CentralWorld	With Whale Store xoxo cast	
25th Thai Festival: Tokyo; MilkLove Special Fan Meeting	9 May 2025	New Pier Hall, Tokyo	With Love	
MilkLove - Connected Hearts in Vietnam Fan Meeting	2 August 2025	District 10 Cultural Center	With Love	
Whale Store xoxo Final EP. Fan Meeting	27 August 2025	Siam Pavalai Royal Grand Theater, Siam Paragon	With Whale Store xoxo cast	
MilkLove Fanmeeting in Manila 2026	25 January 2026	SM North EDSA Skydome Manila, Philippines	With Love	
Girl Rules Fan Meeting in Seoul	4 July 2026	Kwangwoon University Donghae Culture Art Center	With Girl Rules cast	
Girl Rules Fan Meeting in Singapore	1 August 2026	D'Marquee, Downtown East	With Girl Rules cast	
Girl Rules Fan Meeting in Macau	8 August 2026	Fisherman's Wharf Convention and Exhibition Center	With Girl Rules cast	
Girl Rules Fan Meeting in Taipei	15 August 2026	NCCU Art & Culture Center, Auditorium	With Girl Rules cast	
Girl Rules Fan Meeting in Manila	3 October 2026	SMX Convention Center Manila	With Girl Rules cast	
MilkLove Fan Meeting in Madrid	12 December 2026	Espacio Pablo IV Foundation	With Love	
GMMTV Fan Day 40 in USA	16 January 2027	The Ridglea Theatre, Fort Worth	With Love	
MilkLove 1st Fan Meeting in Mexico	20 January 2027	Teatro Metropólitan	With Love	
A Place to Belong: MilkLove Fan Meeting in Brazil	22 January 2027	Teatro Bandeirantes	With Love	

=== Concerts ===
Title	Date	Venue	Notes	Ref.
GMMTV Fanday in Bangkok 2024	1 December 2024	Union Hall, Union Mall	With Love	
Blush Blossom Fan Fest	28–29 June 2025	Union Hall, Union Mall	With Love, Namtan, Film, Emi, Bonnie, View, Mim, June, Mewnich,	
Blush Blossom Fan Fest in Macau	30 November 2025	Fisherman's Wharf Convention & Exhibition Center	With Love, Namtan, Film, Emi, Bonnie, View, Mim, June, Mewnich,	
Blush Blossom Fan Fest: Midnight Bloom	13–14 June 2026	BITEC Live	With Love, Namtan, Film, Emi, Bonnie, View, Mim, Jan, JingJing, June, Mewnich, Pahn, Fond, Kapook, Ciize	
Blush Blossom Fan Fest: Midnight Bloom in Macau	24 October 2026	Fisherman's Wharf Convention & Exhibition Center	With Love, Namtan, Film, Emi, Bonnie, View, Mim, Jan, JingJing, Pahn, Fond, Kapook, Ciize	
Blush Blossom Fan Fest: Midnight Bloom in Kaohsiung	7 November 2026	Kaohsiung Music Center	With Love, Namtan, Film, Emi, Bonnie, View, Mim, Jan, JingJing, Pahn, Fond, Kapook, Ciize	
MilkLove Whimsical House Fancon	15 November 2026	Union Hall, Union Mall	With Love, Kapook, Ciize, Hong, Tui, View, Prim, Tu	

== Awards and nominations ==
Award nominations for Pansa Vosbein
Year	Award	Category	Nominee(s)	Result	Ref.
2024	Howe Awards 2024	The Best Couple Award with Love Pattranite	23.5	Nominated	
2024	Howe Awards 2024	Shining Female Award	23.5	Nominated	
2024	2024 WTW Most Popular Female Artist	Most Popular Female Artist		Won	
2024	2024 Thailand Headlines Person of the Year	Culture and Entertainment		Won	
2025	Kazz Awards 2025	Sao wai sai of the year 2024		Won	
2025	Howe Awards 2025	Hottest Actress Award		Nominated	
2025	The Viral Hits Awards 2025	Best Yuri Duo of the Year with Love Pattranite		Won	
2025	The Viral Hits Awards 2025	Best Yuri Series of the Year	Whale Store xoxo	Won	
2025	NPBL Choice Awards 2025	GL Series of the Year	Whale Store xoxo	Won	
2025	NPBL Choice Awards 2025	Dramatic Scene of the Year	Whale Store xoxo	Won	
2025	NPBL Choice Awards 2025	Kiss Scene of the Year with Love Pattranite	Whale Store xoxo	Won	
2025	NPBL Choice Awards 2025	OST of the Year	My Only Champion	Won	
2025	Hub Awards 2025	Best Chemistry with Love Pattranite	Whale Store xoxo	Won	
2025	Hub Awards 2025	Best Lead Couple (Characters) with Love Pattranite	WanMaewnam	Won	
2025	Hub Awards 2025	Best Original Soundtrack	My Only Champion	Won	
2025	Hub Awards 2025	Best Dramatic Scene	Whale Store xoxo	Won	
2025	Hub Awards 2025	Best Kiss Scene with Love Pattranite	WanMaewnam	Won	
2025	Hub Awards 2025	Best Series	Whale Store xoxo	Won	
2025	Hub Awards 2025	Best Couple with Love Pattranite		Won	
2025	Hub Awards 2025	Best Thai GL	Whale Store xoxo	Won	
2026	Legend 100 List Social Club 2026	Legend Category New Faces		Won	
2026	Lifestyle Asia 50 Icons	Entertainment Leaders		Won	
