= Benyapa Jeenprasom =

Thai actress (born 2002)

- เบญญาภา จีนประสม
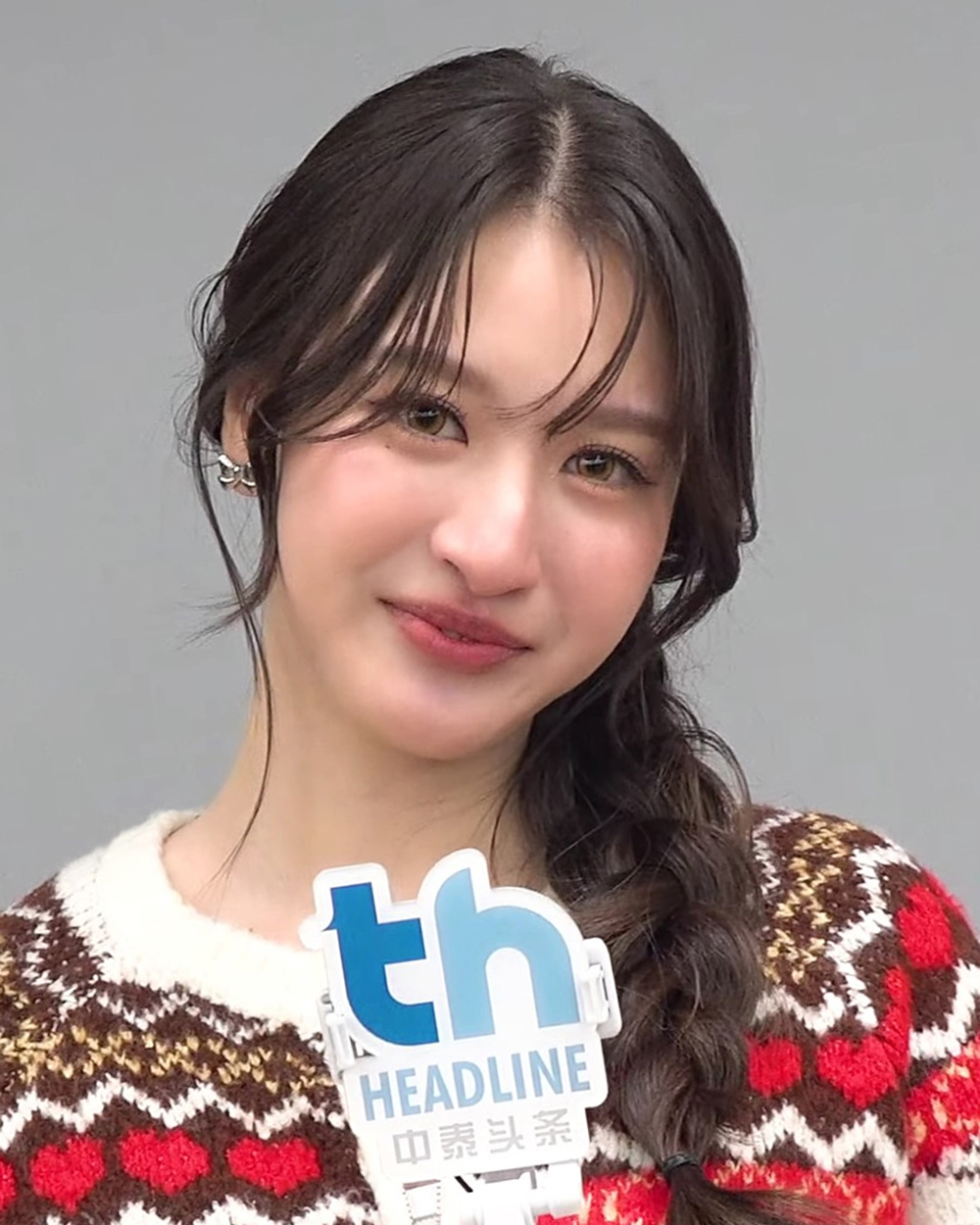
- Benyapa in March 2025
- Born: 4 June 2002 (age 24); Thailand
- Other name: View (วิว)
- Education: Srinakharinwirot University
- Occupation: Actress
- Years active: 2019–present
- Agent: GMMTV
- Known for: Jarunee (aged 15 years old) in 55:15 Never Too Late; Fuji in Home School; Aylin in 23.5
- Height: 172 cm (5 ft 7 1/2 in)

Benyapa Jeenprasom (Thai: เบญญาภา จีนประสม; RTGS: Benyapha Chinprasom; born 4 June 2002), nicknamed View (Thai: วิว), is a Thai actress. She is best known for her roles as 15-year-old Jarunee in 55:15 Never Too Late (2021), Fuji in Home School (2023), and Aylin in 23.5 (2024).

== Early life and education ==
Born in Thailand, Benyapa completed her secondary education at Streesmutprakan School. She graduated with a bachelor's degree in acting and directing for cinema from the College of Social Communication Innovation at Srinakharinwirot University in 2024.

== Career ==
Benyapa entered the entertainment industry after finishing as second runner up in Miss Teen Thailand 2017. She subsequently signed with GMMTV, making her acting debut as Carrot in the 2019 television series Blacklist.

In 2020, she appeared in the series 2gether and played Phingphing, the girlfriend of Way (Pusit Dittapisit), in The Shipper (2020). She landed her first main role the following year as the 15-year-old Jarunee in the coming of age science fiction television series 55:15 Never Too Late.

Benyapa's career expanded in 2022 with several supporting and starring roles, including Gia in Star in My Mind, Ink in Good Old Days: Story 5 - Love Wins, Namwa in The Three GentleBros, and Lookzo in 10 Years Ticket.

In 2023, she played Praew in Moonlight Chicken alongside Pakin Kunaanuwit and portrayed Ja-Oh in the coming-of-age romance film My Precious and its television adaptation. That same year, she gained wider recognition for starring as Fuji in the suspense-horror television series Home School. Her other 2023 projects included Midnight Museum, The Jungle, and Dangerous Romance.

Benyapa achieved further prominence in 2024 for portraying Aylin, a neurodivergent lesbian character, in the Thai girls' love television series 23.5. Later that year, she received additional recognition for playing Eve in High School Frenemy, alongside her appearance in The Trainee.

In 2025, she took on sapphic roles in the television series Us and Sweet Tooth, Good Dentist, starring alongside Rattanawadee Wongthong (Mim). In 2026, View and Mim reunited to star in Girl Rules, followed by the upcoming girls' love television series Bake Love Feeling and Beyond You.

== Filmography ==
=== Film ===
| Year | Title | Role | Ref. |
|---|---|---|---|
| 2021 | 2gether: The Movie | Noomnim | |
| 2023 | My Precious | Ja-Oh | |

Key
| † | Denotes television productions that have not yet been released |

=== Television series ===
Key
| † | Denotes television productions that have not yet been released |

| Year | Title | Role | Notes | Ref. |
|---|---|---|---|---|
| 2019 | Blacklist | Carrot | Supporting role | |
| 2020 | 2gether | Noomnim | Guest role | |
| 2020 | The Shipper | Phingphing | Supporting role | |
| 2021 | 55:15 Never Too Late | Jarunee (aged 15 years old) | Main role | |
| 2022 | Star and Sky: Star in My Mind | "Gia" Georgia | Supporting role | |
| 2022 | Good Old Days: Story 5 - Love Wins | Ink | Supporting role | |
| 2022 | The Three GentleBros | Namwa | Supporting role | |
| 2022 | 10 Years Ticket | Lookzo | Main role | |
| 2023 | Moonlight Chicken | Praew | Supporting role | |
| 2023 | Midnight Museum | Anne | Guest role | |
| 2023 | Home School | Fuji | Main role | |
| 2023 | The Jungle | Kaewta | Supporting role | |
| 2023 | Dangerous Romance | Pimfah | Supporting role | |
| 2024 | 23.5 | Aylin Kuea-ari | Supporting role | |
| 2024 | My Precious The Series | Ja-Oh | Supporting role | |
| 2024 | The Trainee | "Pie" Gulasatree Sansopa | Supporting role | |
| 2024 | High School Frenemy | Eve | Supporting role | |
| 2025 | Us | Oat | Supporting role | |
| 2025 | Sweet Tooth, Good Dentist | Yada | Supporting role | |
| 2026 | Girl Rules | Min | Main role | |
| 2026 | Enemies with Benefits | "Noey" Naralak | Guest role | |
| TBA | Bake Love Feeling † | "Noey" Naralak | Main role | |
| TBA | Beyond You † | Quest | Main role | |

=== Music video appearances ===
| Year | Title | Artist | Ref. |
|---|---|---|---|
| 2019 | "Sky" | Krist Perawat | |
| 2024 | "Yes Man" | Dice | |

== Discography ==
=== Singles ===
==== Collaborations ====
| Year | Title | Notes | Ref. |
|---|---|---|---|
| 2025 | "ฤดูของเรา (Blooming Blossom)"; With Mim, Milk, Love, Namtan, Film, Emi, Bonnie, June, Mewnich | Blush Blossom Fan Fest | |

==== Soundtrack appearances ====
| Year | Title | Soundtrack | Ref. |
|---|---|---|---|
| 2026 | "Girl Rules"; With Mim Rattanawadee, Namtan Tipnaree, Film Rachanun, Milk Pansa, Love Pattranite | Girl Rules OST | |
| 2026 | "Something New"; With Mim Rattanawadee | Girl Rules OST | |

== Fan meetings ==
| Title | Date | Venue | Notes | Ref. |
|---|---|---|---|---|
| 2gether: The Movie First Premiere | 10 November 2021 | Siam Pavalai Royal Grand Theater, Siam Paragon | With 2gether: The Movie Cast | |
| Star in My Mind Final Ep | 27 May 2022 | Siam Pavalai Royal Grand Theater, Siam Paragon | With Star in My Mind Cast | |
| Opening Night Moonlight Chicken | 8 February 2023 | Ballroom Hall 1–2, Queen Sirikit National Convention Center | With Moonlight Chicken Cast | |
| Moonlight Chicken Final Ep. Fan Meeting | 2 March 2023 | True Icon Hall, Iconsiam | With Moonlight Chicken Cast | |
| My Precious First Premiere | 25 April 2023 | Siam Pavalai Royal Grand Theater, Siam Paragon | With My Precious Cast | |
| My Precious On Tour | 27 April – 7 May 2023 | SF Cinema, Thailand | With My Precious Cast | |
| My Precious Finale | 13 June 2023 | SF World Cinema, CentralWorld | With My Precious Cast | |
| Dangerous Romance Final Ep. Fan Meeting | 3 November 2023 | Ultra Arena, Show DC, Bangkok | With Dangerous Romance Cast | |
| 23.5 Lovtitude Final EP. Fan Meeting | 24 May 2024 | Siam Pavalai Royal Grand Theater, Siam Paragon | With 23.5 Cast | |
| The Trainee Final Ep. Fan Meeting | 15 September 2024 | Siam Pavalai Royal Grand Theater, Siam Paragon | With The Trainee Cast | |
| Us Final Ep. Fan Meeting | 5 April 2025 | Siam Pavalai Royal Grand Theater, Siam Paragon | With Us Cast | |
| Sweet Tooth, Good Dentist Final Ep. Fan Meeting | 6 June 2025 | SF World Cinema, CentralWorld | With Sweet Tooth, Good Dentist Cast | |
| Girl Rules: The 1st Rule | 9 March 2026 | MCC Hall, Floor 3, The Mall Lifestore Bangkapi | With Girl Rules Cast | |
| Girl Rules Final Ep. Fan Meeting | 1 June 2026 | Iconsiam Hall, 7th Floor Iconsiam | With Girl Rules Cast | |
| Girl Rules Fan Meeting in Seoul | 4 July 2026 | Dongnae Culture Art Centre, Kwangwoon University | With Girl Rules Cast | |
| Girl Rules Fan Meeting in Singapore | 1 August 2026 | D’Marquee, Downtown East, Singapore | With Girl Rules Cast | |
| Girl Rules Fan Meeting in Macau | 8 August 2026 | Macau Fisherman's Wharf Conference Exhibition Center Hall Two | With Girl Rules Cast | |
| Girl Rules Fan Meeting in Taipei | 15 August 2026 | NCCU Art & Culture Center, Taipei City | With Girl Rules Cast | |
| Girl Rules Fan Meeting in Manila | 3 October 2026 | Function Room 3-5, 2nd Floor, SMX Convention Center Manila | With Girl Rules Cast | |

== Concerts ==
| Title | Date | Venue | Notes | Ref. |
|---|---|---|---|---|
| Blush Blossom Fan Fest | 28–29 June 2025 | Union Hall, Union Mall | With Mim, Milk, Love, Namtan, Film, Emi, Bonnie, June, Mewnich | |
| Blush Blossom Fan Fest in Macau | 30 November 2025 | Fisherman's Wharf Convention & Exhibition Center | With Mim, Milk, Love, Namtan, Film, Emi, Bonnie, June, Mewnich | |
| Blush Blossom Fan Fest: Midnight Bloom | 13–14 June 2026 | BITEC Live | With Mim, Milk, Love, Namtan, Film, Emi, Bonnie, Jan, JingJing, June, Mewnich, Pahn, Fond, Kapook, Ciize | |
| Blush Blossom Fan Fest: Midnight Bloom in Macau | 24 October 2026 | Fisherman's Wharf Convention & Exhibition Center | With Mim, Milk, Love, Namtan, Film, Emi, Bonnie, Jan, JingJing, Pahn, Fond, Kapook, Ciize | |
| Blush Blossom Fan Fest: Midnight Bloom in Kaohsiung | 7 November 2026 | Kaohsiung Music Center | With Mim, Milk, Love, Namtan, Film, Emi, Bonnie, Jan, JingJing, Pahn, Fond, Kapook, Ciize | |
| MilkLove Whimsical House Fancon | 15 November 2026 | Union Hall, Union Mall | With Milk, Love, Prim, Tu, Kapook, Ciize, Hong, Tui | |
