= Whale Store xoxo =

2025 Thai television series

- Official series poster
- Thai: คุณวาฬร้านชำ Whale Store xoxo
- Genre: Girls' love; Romantic drama
- Based on: The Whale Store: คุณวาฬร้านชำ by Snow Leopard (เสือดาวหิมะ)
- Screenplay by: Pattarawalai Wongsinwises; Sureechay Kaewses; Rittikrai Kanjanawiphu
- Directed by: Sakon Wongsinwiset
- Starring: Pansa Vosbein; Pattranite Limpatiyakorn
- Country of origin: Thailand
- Original language: Thai
- No. of episodes: 10

Production
- Running time: 50 minutes
- Production companies: GMMTV; Chamade Film

Original release
- Network: GMM 25; Netflix
- Release: 25 June – 27 August 2025

Related
- Enemies With Benefits; Bake Love Feeling

Whale Store xoxo (Thai: คุณวาฬร้านชำ RTGS: Khun Wan Ran Cham; lit. 'Khun Wan Grocery Store') is a Thai girls' love television series starring Pansa Vosbein (Milk) and Pattranite Limpatiyakorn (Love).

Adapted from the novel of the same name by Snow Leopard (Thai: เสือดาวหิมะ) and produced by GMMTV together with Chamade Film, it was announced as one of the television series of GMMTV for 2025 during their GMMTV 2025: Riding the Wave event held on 26 November 2024. It premiered on 25 June 2025 airing every Wednesday at 20:30 (ICT) on GMM 25 and also streams on Netflix. The series concluded on 27 August 2025 with 10 episodes.

It serves as a standalone series in a shared universe with Enemies With Benefits (2026) and the upcoming Thai girl’s love television series Bake Love Feeling.

== Synopsis ==
When it rains, it pours. Wan feels sad after she's fired by her boss and her father dies of a heart attack. As a result, she inherits her father's struggling grocery store. One day, she meets Maewnam, a charming regular customer, carrying half a cup of noodles with a note that said: "Give to the customer at 11 pm." Wan is confused, who would come to a grocery store at that hour? The customer is later revealed to be Maewnam. Moreover, Wan is Maewnam's first love!

Maewnam then begins to approach Wan again like there's no tomorrow. Her actions eventually reach Maewnam's friends, Tonnam and Chompoo. Whenever Maewnam tells them about Wan, the two tend to have very opposing opinions, since Maewnam's family has a business that could be a threat to Wan's store. After all, Maewnam has to do everything she can to win Wan's heart.

== Cast and characters ==
=== Main ===
- Pansa Vosbein (Milk) as Wan
- Pattranite Limpatiyakorn (Love) as Maewnam

=== Supporting ===
- Wanwimol Jaenasavamethee (June) as Tonnam
- Nannaphas Loetnamchoetsakun (Mewnich) as Chompoo
- Kanyarat Ruangrung (Piploy) as Noey
- Prariyapit Yu (JingJing) as Mahnmook (Wan's ex-girlfriend)
- Supoj Pongpancharoen (Durian) as Wan's father
- Thansita Suwatcharathanakit (Chompu) as Chompoo's mother
- Sukhapat Lohwacharin (Suam) as Phruek (Wan's boss)
- Jirawat Vachirasarunpatra (War) as Lee
- Pariya Wongrabieb (Mam) as Pim
- Thawatchai Petchsuk (Nuree) as Fern (Som Salon employee)
- Gandhi Wasuwitchayagit as Vee
- Kamolnapatch Thanwong (Pangza) as Yu (Wan's co-worker)
- Pongsit Phisitthakarn (Eikew) as Dome (Wan's co-worker)
- Thanawin Teeraphosukarn (Louis) as Arm
- Napat Patcharachavalit (Aun) as Wanan
- Phumphat Chartsuriyakiat (Meng) as Kung

== Episodes ==
No. in series	Title	Directed by	Written by	Original release date
1	"Life is Riding a Bicycle"	Sakon Wongsinwiset	Pattarawalai Wongsinwises, Sureechay Kaewses, Rittikrai Kanjanawiphu	25 June 2025
2	"When One Door Closes, Another Door Opens"	Sakon Wongsinwiset	Pattarawalai Wongsinwises, Sureechay Kaewses, Rittikrai Kanjanawiphu	2 July 2025
3	"It's Never Too Late to Start Again"	Sakon Wongsinwiset	Pattarawalai Wongsinwises, Sureechay Kaewses, Rittikrai Kanjanawiphu	9 July 2025
4	"Everything Happens for a Reason"	Sakon Wongsinwiset	Pattarawalai Wongsinwises, Sureechay Kaewses, Rittikrai Kanjanawiphu	16 July 2025
5	"Try to be a Rainbow in Someone's Cloud"	Sakon Wongsinwiset	Pattarawalai Wongsinwises, Sureechay Kaewses, Rittikrai Kanjanawiphu	23 July 2025
6	"Believe You Can and You're Halfway There"	Sakon Wongsinwiset	Pattarawalai Wongsinwises, Sureechay Kaewses, Rittikrai Kanjanawiphu	30 July 2025
7	"If Opportunity Doesn't Knock Build A Door"	Sakon Wongsinwiset	Pattarawalai Wongsinwises, Sureechay Kaewses, Rittikrai Kanjanawiphu	6 August 2025
8	"It Hurts Because It Mattered"	Sakon Wongsinwiset	Pattarawalai Wongsinwises, Sureechay Kaewses, Rittikrai Kanjanawiphu	13 August 2025
9	"Don't Cry Because It Mattered, Smile Because It Happened"	Sakon Wongsinwiset	Pattarawalai Wongsinwises, Sureechay Kaewses, Rittikrai Kanjanawiphu	20 August 2025
10	"A Good Beginning Makes A Good Ending"	Sakon Wongsinwiset	Pattarawalai Wongsinwises, Sureechay Kaewses, Rittikrai Kanjanawiphu	27 August 2025

== Soundtrack ==
Song title	English title	Artist	Ref.
รางวัลคนเก่ง	"My Only Champion"	Milk Pansa, Love Pattranite	
เหนื่อยจะถาม	"Lost In Between"	June Wanwimol, Mewnich Nannaphas	
จ่ายด้วยหัวใจ	"One-Heart Deal"	Milk Pansa, Love Pattranite	

== Awards and nominations ==
Award nominations for Whale Store xoxo
Year	Award	Category	Nominee(s)	Result	Ref.
2025	The Viral Hits Awards 2025	Best Yuri Series of the Year	Whale Store xoxo	Won	
2025	NPBL Choice Awards 2025	GL Series of the Year	Whale Store xoxo	Won	
2025	NPBL Choice Awards 2025	Actress of the Year	Pattranite Limpatiyakorn	Won	
2025	NPBL Choice Awards 2025	Dramatic Scene of the Year	Whale Store xoxo	Won	
2025	NPBL Choice Awards 2025	Kiss Scene of the Year	Pattranite Limpatiyakorn and Pansa Vosbein	Won	
2025	NPBL Choice Awards 2025	OST of the Year	"My Only Champion"	Won	
2025	Hub Awards 2025	Best Chemistry	Pattranite Limpatiyakorn and Pansa Vosbein	Won	
2025	Hub Awards 2025	Best Lead Couple (Characters)	WanMaewnam Pattranite Limpatiyakorn and Pansa Vosbein	Won	
2025	Hub Awards 2025	Best Original Soundtrack	"My Only Champion"	Won	
2025	Hub Awards 2025	Best Dramatic Scene	Whale Store xoxo	Won	
2025	Hub Awards 2025	Best Kiss Scene	Pattranite Limpatiyakorn and Pansa Vosbein	Won	
2025	Hub Awards 2025	Best Series	Whale Store xoxo	Won	
2025	Hub Awards 2025	Best Couple	Pattranite Limpatiyakorn and Pansa Vosbein	Won	
2025	Hub Awards 2025	Best Actress	Pattranite Limpatiyakorn	Won	
2025	Hub Awards 2025	Best Thai GL	Whale Store xoxo	Won	
2026	SEC Awards 2026	Favorite Couple/Ship	Pattranite Limpatiyakorn and Pansa Vosbein	Won	
2026	SEC Awards 2026	Best LGBTQIA+ Series	Whale Store xoxo	Won	
2026	SEC Awards 2026	International Crush of the Year	Pattranite Limpatiyakorn	Nominated	
2026	SEC Awards 2026	Performance in Asian Series	Pansa Vosbein	Nominated	
2026	Thailand Y Content Awards 2025	Best Production Design	Whale Store xoxo	Nominated	
2026	Thailand Y Content Awards 2025	Best Promotion of Thai Tourism	Whale Store xoxo	Nominated	
