= Rattanawadee Wongthong =

Thai actress and model (born 2004)

- รัตนวดี วงค์ทอง
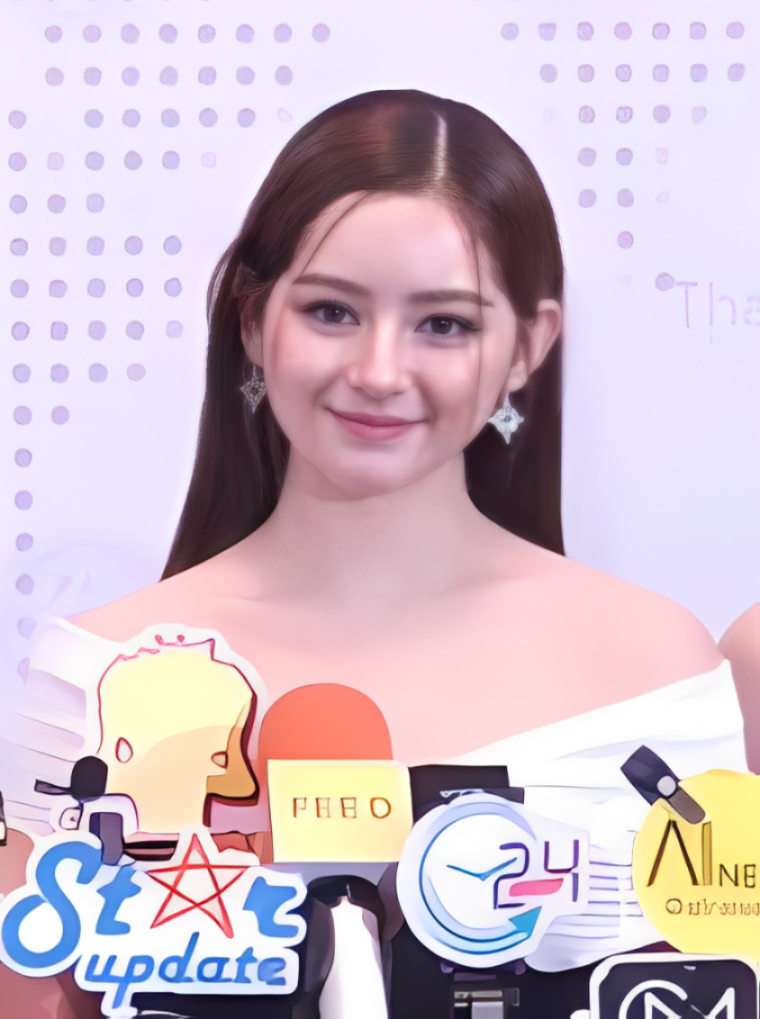
- Rattanawadee in December 2025
- Born: 22 May 2004 (age 22); Bangkok, Thailand
- Other name: Mim (มิ้ม)
- Education: Srinakharinwirot University
- Occupations: Actress; model
- Years active: 2019–present
- Agent: GMMTV
- Known for: Yam in Death Whisperer and Death Whisperer 2; Nene in Us
- Height: 160 cm (5 ft 3 in)

Rattanawadee Wongthong (Thai: รัตนวดี วงค์ทอง; born 22 May 2004), nicknamed Mim (Thai: มิ้ม), is a Thai actress and model. Her breakthrough came in 2023 with her first major film role as Yam in the critically acclaimed and commercially successful horror film Death Whisperer, a role she reprised in its sequel, Death Whisperer 2 (2024). In 2024, she signed with GMMTV and expanded her work by taking on sapphic roles in the television series Us (2025) and Girl Rules (2026).

== Early life and education ==
Rattanawadee was born in Bangkok, Thailand. She is the eldest of three siblings. She completed her secondary education at Nawaminthrachinuthit Satriwitthaya 2 School. She initially studied law at Sripatum University for a year before transferring to Srinakharinwirot University's Faculty of Fine Arts, majoring in acting and directing.

== Career ==
Rattanawadee began her career as a child actress, making early television appearances in 2019 as younger versions of main characters in Plerng Prang Tian and Si Mai Khan, followed by supporting roles in My Himalayan Embrace and Watsanarak in 2020. She subsequently played Kimchi in Help Me! Oh My Ghost (2021) and Marin in My Coach (2022).

Her career reached a turning point in 2023 when she gained widespread fame for starring as Yam, a young woman possessed by a malevolent spirit, in the hit horror film Death Whisperer. In 2024, she took on main roles across several television series. That August, it was announced that she had signed with GMMTV, coming immediately after Riser Music revealed her as the star of Norawit Titicharoenrak's music video for "เหนื่อยหน่อยนะ" (Someone Like Me). Later that year, she reprised her role as Yam in the blockbuster sequel Death Whisperer 2.

In 2025, she took on sapphic roles in both television series Us and Sweet Tooth, Good Dentist, starring alongside Benyapa Jeenprasom (View). In 2026, she extended her ongoing on-screen partnership with View in the romantic drama Girl Rules, featuring as part of an ensemble cast that also includes Milk Pansa, Love Pattranite, Namtan Tipnaree, and Film Rachanun. She is also set to star alongside View in the upcoming girls' love series Bake Love Feeling and Beyond You.

== Filmography ==
=== Film ===
| Year | Title | Role | Ref. |
|---|---|---|---|
| 2023 | Death Whisperer | Yam | |
| 2024 | Death Whisperer 2 | Yam | |
| 2025 | Art of the Devil: Beginning | Jib | |
| 2026 | The Djinn's Curse 2 | Diana | |

=== Short film ===
| Year | Title | Role | Notes | Ref. |
|---|---|---|---|---|
| 2024 | My Soulmate Is Meteor | Namtan / Narin | Main role | |

=== Television series ===
Key
| † | Denotes television productions that have not yet been released |

| Year | Title | Role | Notes | Ref. |
|---|---|---|---|---|
| 2019 | Plerng Prang Tian | Ounhuan (young) | Supporting role | |
| 2019 | Si Mai Khan | Phikul (young) | Guest role | |
| 2020 | My Himalayan Embrace | Saipan | Guest role | |
| 2020 | Watsanarak | "Sa" Phansa Khanthong (young) | Supporting role | |
| 2021 | Help Me! Oh My Ghost | Kimchi | Supporting role | |
| 2022 | My Coach | Marin | Supporting role | |
| 2024 | Club Friday Hot Love Issue: New Story, Old Love | Grace | Main role | |
| 2024 | Eightraordinary | "Tulip" Thipnaree Jongrueangsamut | Main role | |
| 2024 | Rujak Phi Yajai Mai? | Chompoo | Main role | |
| 2024 | That Night Was You | Ploy | Main role | |
| 2025 | Us | "Nene" Lalana Asavasuree | Supporting role | |
| 2025 | Sweet Tooth, Good Dentist | Baipor | Supporting role | |
| 2026 | Girl Rules | Praew | Main role | |
| 2026 | Enemies with Benefits | "Cheese" Chadcharan | Guest role | |
| TBA | Bake Love Feeling † | "Cheese" Chadcharan | Main role | |
| TBA | Beyond You † | Mar | Main role | |
| TBA | Pie and the 7 Witches † | Meen | Main role | |

=== Music video appearances ===
| Year | Title | Artist | Ref. |
|---|---|---|---|
| 2023 | "ธี่เดินทางกลับมา" (Death Whisperer OST) | Karn The Parkinson | |
| 2023 | "เพื่อนคนเดิม" (Friend Zone) | Firzter | |
| 2024 | "ลูกคุณหนู" | Meyou ft. Pun | |
| 2024 | "เหนื่อยหน่อยนะ" (Someone Like Me) | Gemini | |
| 2024 | "ฝนดาวตก" | Tytan | |
| 2025 | "City Lights" | This City | |

== Discography ==
=== Singles ===
==== Collaborations ====
| Year | Title | Notes | Ref. |
|---|---|---|---|
| 2025 | "ฤดูของเรา (Blooming Blossom)"; With View, Milk, Love, Namtan, Film, Emi, Bonnie, June, Mewnich | Blush Blossom Fan Fest | |

==== Soundtrack appearances ====
| Year | Title | Album | Ref. |
|---|---|---|---|
| 2026 | "Girl Rules"; With View Benyapa, Namtan Tipnaree, Film Rachanun, Milk Pansa, Love Pattranite | Girl Rules OST | |
| 2026 | "Something New"; With View Benyapa | Girl Rules OST | |

== Fan meetings ==
| Title | Date | Venue | Notes | Ref. |
|---|---|---|---|---|
| Us Final Ep. Fan Meeting | 5 April 2025 | Siam Pavalai Royal Grand Theater, Siam Paragon | With Us Cast | |
| Girl Rules: The 1st Rule | 9 March 2026 | MCC Hall, Floor 3, The Mall Lifestore Bangkapi | With Girl Rules Cast | |
| Girl Rules Final Ep. Fan Meeting | 1 June 2026 | Iconsiam Hall, 7th Floor Iconsiam | With Girl Rules Cast | |
| Girl Rules Fan Meeting in Seoul | 4 July 2026 | Dongnae Culture Art Centre, Kwangwoon University, Korea | With Girl Rules Cast | |
| Girl Rules Fan Meeting in Singapore | 1 August 2026 | D’Marquee, Downtown East, Singapore | With Girl Rules Cast | |
| Girl Rules Fan Meeting in Macau | 8 August 2026 | Macau Fisherman's Wharf Conference Exhibition Center Hall Two | With Girl Rules Cast | |
| Girl Rules Fan Meeting in Taipei | 15 August 2026 | NCCU Art & Culture Center, Taipei Cit | With Girl Rules Cast | |
| Girl Rules Fan Meeting in Manila | 3 October 2026 | Function Room 3-5, 2nd Floor, SMX Convention Center Manila | With Girl Rules Cast | |

== Concerts ==
| Title | Date | Venue | Notes | Ref. |
|---|---|---|---|---|
| Blush Blossom Fan Fest | 28–29 June 2025 | Union Hall, Union Mall | With View, Milk, Love, Namtan, Film, Emi, Bonnie, June, Mewnich | |
| Blush Blossom Fan Fest in Macau | 30 November 2025 | Fisherman's Wharf Convention & Exhibition Center | With View, Milk, Love, Namtan, Film, Emi, Bonnie, June, Mewnich | |
| Blush Blossom Fan Fest: Midnight Bloom | 13–14 June 2026 | BITEC Live | With View, Milk, Love, Namtan, Film, Emi, Bonnie, Jan, JingJing, June, Mewnich, Pahn, Fond, Kapook, Ciize | |
| Blush Blossom Fan Fest: Midnight Bloom in Macau | 24 October 2026 | Fisherman's Wharf Convention & Exhibition Center | With View, Milk, Love, Namtan, Film, Emi, Bonnie, Jan, JingJing, Pahn, Fond, Kapook, Ciize | |
| Blush Blossom Fan Fest: Midnight Bloom in Kaohsiung | 7 November 2026 | Kaohsiung Music Center | With View, Milk, Love, Namtan, Film, Emi, Bonnie, Jan, JingJing, Pahn, Fond, Kapook, Ciize | |

== Awards and nominations ==
Award nominations for Rattanawadee Wongthong
| Year | Award | Category | Nominee(s) | Result | Ref. |
|---|---|---|---|---|---|
| 2023 | Superstar Maya Idol Awards 2023 | Superstar Rookie | Death Whisperer | Won | |
| 2024 | 12th Ganesha Awards | Best Leading Actress | Death Whisperer | Won | |
| 2025 | Siamrath Awards 2025 | Most Popular Rising Star | Death Whisperer | Won | |
