= Nannaphas Loetnamchoetsakun =

Thai singer and actress (born 2002)

- นันท์นภัส เลิศนามเชิดสกุล
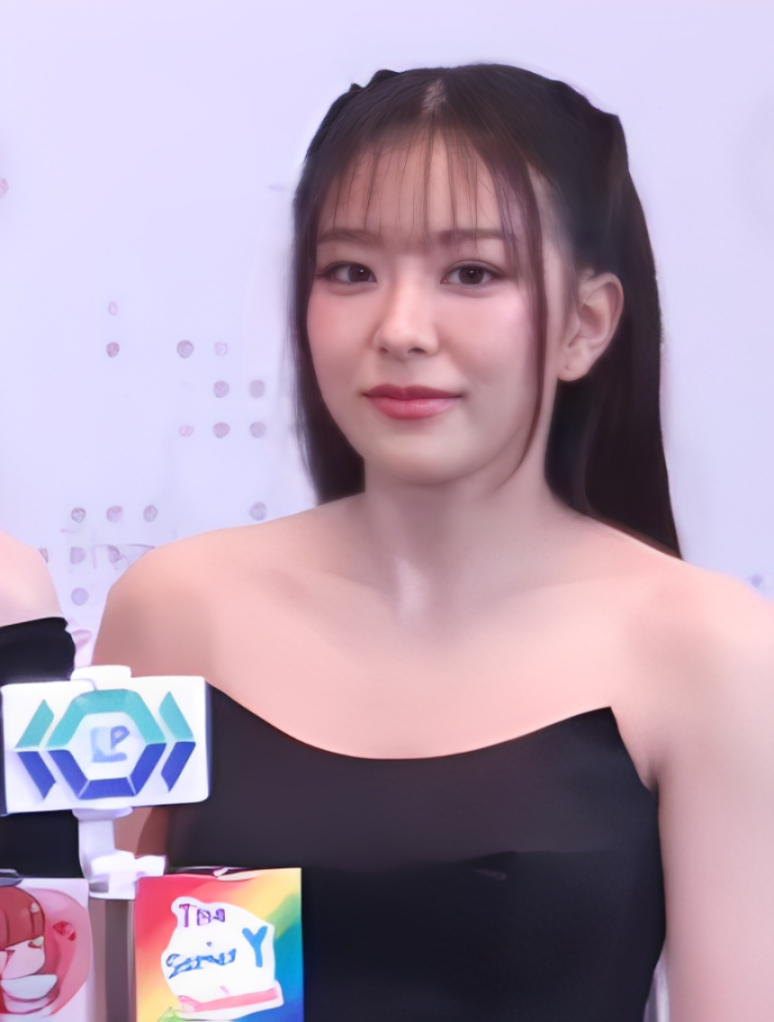
- Nannaphas in December 2025
- Born: 11 March 2002 (age 24); Samut Prakan, Thailand
- Other name: Mewnich (มิวนิค)
- Education: Srinakharinwirot University
- Occupations: Singer; actress
- Years active: 2008–present
- Agents: BNK48 Office (2018–2019); iAM (2019–2021); GMMTV (2024–present)
- Known for: Channel 7's Disney Club (host, 2010–2018); The Underclass (actress as Pang, 2020)
- Height: 160 cm (5 ft 3 in)
- Musical career
- Genres: T-pop; J-pop
- Instrument: Vocals
- Labels: BNK48 Office; independent Artist Management (iAM)
- Formerly of: BNK48

Nannaphas Loetnamchoetsakun (Thai: นันท์นภัส เลิศนามเชิดสกุล; born 11 March 2002), nicknamed Mewnich (Thai: มิวนิค), is a Thai actress and singer. She is a former member of the Thai idol girl group BNK48, an international sister group of the Japanese idol girl group AKB48, where she served as a second-generation member and part of Team NV.

Prior to joining BNK48 in 2018, she is known as a main host of Channel 7's Disney Club. She is also recognized for her leading roles in the romantic comedy series One Year (2019) and the Netflix teen drama series The Underclass (2020).

== Early life and education ==
Nannaphas was born in Samut Prakan, Thailand. She received her nickname "Mewnich" because her mother was pregnant with her while visiting Munich, Germany. She has a younger sister nicknamed Ming.

She attended Assumption College Samutprakarn through Grade 11, obtained a GED diploma, and subsequently enrolled at Srinakharinwirot University, graduating with a Bachelor of Arts degree in Integrated Tourism Management from the Faculty of Environmental Culture and Ecotourism in 2023.

== Career ==
=== 2010–2018: Child actress and Disney Club's host ===
Nannaphas began her career as a child actress, making her television debut in the 2008 lakorn Seu Rak Chak Yai Olawon and her film debut in The Last Moment the same year. She gained wider recognition as a main co-host of Channel 7's Disney Club alongside Teeratun Khachonchaidechawut (Bogus) and Peerapon Permped (Pepe) from 2010 to 2018. She stepped down from the hosting role to join BNK48's second generation in 2018, inspired by the group's first generation to pursue singing and dancing skills. Throughout her childhood, she continued to appear in various lakorns, portraying younger counterparts of main characters or child roles.

=== 2018–2021: BNK48 member and other performances ===
Nannaphas was introduced as a second-generation trainee at Bangkok Comic Con x Thailand Comic Con on 29 April 2018, making her official stage debut during "BNK48 2nd Generation: The Debut" on 17 July. She served as the center for "Tsugi no Season", a coupling song sung by second-generation trainees on BNK48's fourth single, "Kimi wa Melody", and was selected as a senbatsu member for "BNK Festival".

In 2019, she placed 23rd in BNK48's first general election, earning a spot as an "Undergirls" on the B-side "Kimi no Koto ga Suki Dakara" for the sixth single "Beginner". On 4 April of that same year, she starred as Mora in the horror film SisterS, playing a girl carrying the krasue curse. She later participated in the coupling song "Reborn" from the second album "Jabaja".

On 19 November 2019, she was promoted to a regular member of the newly formed Team NV. Shortly after, she starred as Praewprow in the romantic comedy series One Year alongside fellow BNK48 members, and featured on its soundtrack "Supporter" from the seventh single "77 no Suteki na Machi e".

In 2020, she ranked 20th in BNK48's second general election, securing another "Undergirls" position for the ninth single. She then starred as Pang, a Class A student demoted to Class F following a cheating scandal in the Netflix teen drama series The Underclass, appearing alongside fellow BNK48 members and Tanutchai Wijitvongtong. Her other 2020 projects included appearances in the documentary film BNK48: One Take and various single B-sides, such as "Hashire! Penguin", "Can you ...?", and "Ma Ma Milk".

=== 2021–present: Departure from BNK48 and subsequent acting career ===
Nannaphas announced her graduation from BNK48 on 12 March 2021 due to health and educational priorities. Her final activities as a member concluded on 30 September, and she officially graduated on 5 December.

Transitioning back to full-time acting, she played Faifu in the coming-of-age melodrama series Finding the Rainbow (2022). In 2023, she portrayed Patty in the comedy series Mission Fan-Possible.

In May 2024, she officially signed with GMMTV. Her first project under the agency was starring in the music video for Nattawat Jirochtikul's single "ง้อ" (Alright). She subsequently took on girls' love roles, starring alongside Wanwimol Jaenasavamethee (June) in the television series Whale Store xoxo (2025). They were originally paired for the upcoming girls' love series Love's Echoes, though June later stepped down from the project and was replaced by Krongkwan Nakornthap (Jaoying).

== Discography ==
=== BNK48 singles ===
Year	Title	Role	Notes
2018	"Kimi wa Melody"	B-side	Sang "Tsugi no Season (ฤดูใหม่)" as centre
2018	"BNK Festival"	A-side	
2019	"Beginner"	B-side	Sang "Kimi no Koto ga Suki Dakara (ก็เพราะว่าชอบเธอ)"
2019	"77 no Suteki na Machi e"	B-side	Sang "Supporter (สายซับ)"
2020	"Heavy Rotation"	B-side	Sang "Hashire! Penguin (วิ่งไปสิ...เพนกวิน)"

=== BNK48 albums ===
Year	Title	Role	Notes
2019	"Jabaja"	B-side	Sang "Reborn"
2020	"Warota People"	B-side	Sang "Can you ...?" and "Ma Ma Milk"

=== Singles ===
==== Collaborations ====
Year	Title	Notes	Ref.
2025	"ฤดูของเรา (Blooming Blossom)" (with June, Milk, Love, Namtan, Film, Emi, Bonnie, View, Mim)	Blush Blossom Fan Fest	

==== Soundtrack appearances ====
Year	Title	Album	Label	Ref.
2025	"เหนื่อยจะถาม (Lost In Between)" (with June Wanwimol)	Whale Store xoxo OST	GMMTV Records	

== Filmography ==
=== Film ===
Year	Title	Role	Notes	Ref.
2008	The Last Moment	Nong Fah	Supporting role	
2010	After School	Tune	Supporting role	
2019	SisterS	Mora	Main role	
2020	BNK48: One Take	Herself	Documentary film	

=== Television series ===
Key
†	Denotes television productions that have not yet been released

Year	Title	Role	Notes	Ref.
2008	Seu Rak Chak Yai Olawon	Jin	Supporting role	
2009	Fai Ruk Arsoon	Goong Nang	Supporting role	
2009	Khun Nu Chantana	Aye	Supporting role	
2010	Mongkut Dok Som	Kongkaew	Supporting role	
2011	Dok Som See Thong	Kongkaew	Supporting role	
2012	Moo Daeng	Prim	Supporting role	
2012	Tawan Yod Rak	Nungning	Supporting role	
2012	Qi Pao	Pei Pei (young)	Guest role	
2013	E-Sa	E-Sa / Usawadee (young)	Guest role	
2014	Rai Rak Payak Kung Fu	Lin Lin	Supporting role	
2015	Mongkut Ritsaya	Fah (young)	Supporting role	
2016	Kamin Gub Poon	Tantawan (young)	Supporting role	
2017	Tawan Yor Saeng	Tawan (young)	Guest role	
2018	Muang Maya Live The Series: Sai Luerd Maya	An	Supporting role	
2019	One Year 365	Praewprow	Supporting role	
2020	The Underclass	Pang	Main role	
2022	Finding The Rainbow	Faifu	Supporting role	
2023	Mission Fan-Possible	Patty	Main role	
2025	Whale Store xoxo	Chompoo	Supporting role	
2025	The Dark Dice	Mamay	Supporting role	
2026	Love's Echoes †	New	Main role	

=== Television shows ===
Year	Title	Channel	Notes	Ref.
2010–2018	Disney Club	Channel 7	Main host	
2018	Victory BNK48	Workpoint TV	Regular member	
2018	BNK48 Senpai: 2nd Generation	Workpoint TV	Regular member	
2018	AniParade!	One31	Main host	

=== Music video appearances ===
Year	Title	Artist	Ref.
2024	"ง้อ" (Alright)	Fourth	

== Fanmeetings ==
Title	Date	Venue	Notes	Ref.
Whale Store xoxo: First Come, First Love!	June 25, 2025	SF World Cinema, CentralWorld	With Whale Store xoxo cast	
Whale Store xoxo Final EP. Fan Meeting	August 27, 2025	Siam Pavalai Royal Grand Theater, Siam Paragon	With Whale Store xoxo cast	
Naiin Book Fair 2026	January 24, 2026	Samyan Mitrtown, 5th Fl.	With June	
GMMTV Fanival: Happy Family	October 3, 2026	Union Hall, Union Mall	With Jaoying	

== Concerts ==
Title	Date	Venue	Notes	Ref.
BNK48 Concert: 1st 2gether	September 15, 2018	CentralWorld, Bangkok	With BNK48's 1st and 2nd generation	
BNK48 Space Mission Concert	January 26, 2019	Impact Arena, Muang Thong Thani	With BNK48	
BNK48 2nd Generation: Blooming Season Concert	November 2, 2019	BITEC Bangna Hall 106, Bangkok	With BNK48's 2nd generation	
Blush Blossom Fan Fest	June 28–29, 2025	Union Hall, Union Mall	With June, Milk, Love, Namtan, Film, Emi, Bonnie, View, Mim	
Blush Blossom Fan Fest in Macau	November 30, 2025	Fisherman’s Wharf Convention & Exhibition Center, Macau	With June, Milk, Love, Namtan, Film, Emi, Bonnie, View, Mim	
Blush Blossom Fan Fest: Midnight Bloom	June 13–14, 2026	BITEC LIVE	With June, Milk, Love, Namtan, Film, Emi, Bonnie, View, Mim, Jan JingJing, Pahn, Fond, Kapook, Ciize	

== Awards and nominations ==
Year	Award	Category	Work	Result	Ref.
2020	Kazz Awards 2020	Sao Wai Sai of The Year	—N/a	Won	
2021	12th Nataraja Awards	Best Cast Ensemble	One Year 365	Nominated	
