= Pattranite Limpatiyakorn =

Thai actress (born 2000)

- ภัทรานิษฐ์ ลิ้มปติยากร
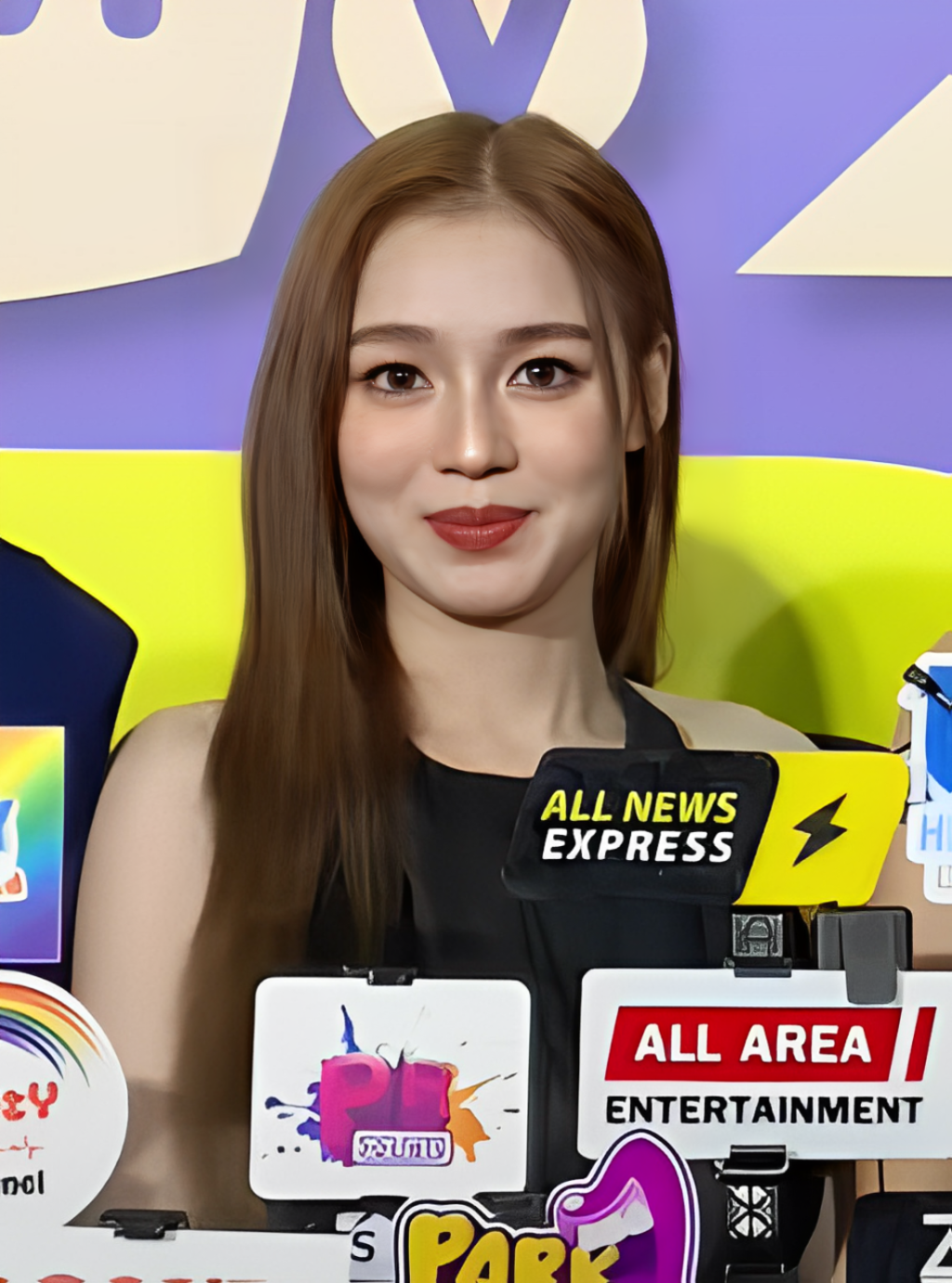
- Pattranite in November 2024
- Born: 23 May 2000 (age 26)
- Education: Srinakharinwirot University
- Occupations: Actress; model
- Years active: 2019–present
- Agent: GMMTV
- Notable work: 2gether: The Series (2020); Bad Buddy (2021); 23.5 (2024); Whale Store xoxo (2025); Girl Rules (2026)
- Height: 156 cm (5 ft 1 1/2 in)

Pattranite Limpatiyakorn (Thai: ภัทรานิษฐ์ ลิ้มปติยากร; RTGS: Phatthranit Limpatiyakon; IPA: [pʰát.tʰraː.nít lím.pà.tì.jaː.kɔːn]; born 23 May 2000), nicknamed Love (Thai: เลิฟ), is a Thai actress and model. She made her acting debut in the 2019 television series He's Coming to Me and gained wider recognition through 2gether (2020). She is also well known for her sapphic roles in Bad Buddy (2021), 23.5 (2024) and Whale Store xoxo (2025).

== Early life and education ==
Pattranite was born on 23 May 2000, the eldest of three siblings. Her father gave her the nickname "Love" as she was their first-born child.

She completed her secondary education at Mater Dei School, where she initially studied French with intentions of pursuing a diplomatic career. She subsequently attended the College of Social Communication Innovation at Srinakharinwirot University, majoring in performing arts. She graduated with her bachelor's degree in 2022.

== Career ==
=== 2018–2020: Career beginnings ===
Pattranite began modeling for magazines and television advertisements during her school years. In 2018, she participated in the Go On Girl Star Search talent contest, organized by GMMTV and Clean & Clear. After winning the competition, she signed an exclusive contract with the agency.

She made her screen acting debut in 2019 with a supporting role in He's Coming to Me, followed by a role in the series Blacklist later that year. She gained wider recognition in 2020 for her role as Pear in the romantic comedy-drama 2gether, reprising the role in its sequel series Still 2gether later that year.

=== 2021–present: Television roles and recognition ===
In 2021, Pattranite reprised her role as Pear in the film adaptation 2gether: The Movie. Later that year, she starred as Pa in the romantic drama Bad Buddy, playing opposite Pansa Vosbein. Their on-screen pairing gained significant popularity on social media, establishing them as a prominent partnership.

Following this success, Pattranite continued to expand her acting career, frequently collaborating with Pansa in various television series. The duo co-starred in Vice Versa (2022) and Magic of Zero (2022), and later took on leading roles in 23.5 (2024), Whale Store xoxo (2025), and Girl Rules (2026). Their partnership led to fan meetings across Asia, an appearance at the 2nd WTW Global Woman Summit in Shanghai in July 2024, and a joint concert in Bangkok in December 2024.

=== Other ventures ===
In 2020, Pattranite launched her own cosmetics brand, Twenty Wendy. She founded the brand after developing an allergic reaction to an imported South Korean lip tint oil, which inspired her to formulate her own alternative products suitable for sensitive skin within the Thai market. Originally named Twenty Twenty, the brand was officially rebranded to its current name during the COVID-19 pandemic.

== Filmography ==
=== Film ===
| Year | Title | Role | Ref. |
|---|---|---|---|
| 2021 | 2gether: The Movie | Pear | |
| 2022 | Alone in Outing | Bell | |

=== Television series ===
Key
| † | Denotes television productions that have not yet been released |

| Year | Title | Role | Network | Ref. |
|---|---|---|---|---|
| 2019 | He's Coming to Me | Kwan | GMM 25 | |
| 2019 | Blacklist | Phukkad | GMM 25 | |
| 2020 | 2gether: The Series | Pear | GMM 25 | |
| 2020 | Still 2gether | Pear | GMM 25 | |
| 2021 | Bad Buddy | Pa | GMM 25 | |
| 2022 | Vice Versa | Prae | GMM 25 | |
| 2022 | Magic of Zero | Pa | GMM 25 | |
| 2023 | Home School | Pleng | GMM 25 | |
| 2024 | 23.5 | Sun | GMM 25 | |
| 2025 | Whale Store xoxo | Maewnam | GMM 25 | |
| 2026 | Girl Rules | Gorya | GMM 25 | |
| TBA | Ditto † | Rafah | GMM 25 | |
| TBA | Cherish † | Cher | TBA | |

=== Music video appearances ===
| Year | Title | Artist | Ref. |
|---|---|---|---|
| 2020 | "You're So Beautiful" | Krist Perawat | |
| 2020 | "Dao Tho Prakai" (Thai: ดาวทอประกาย) | Chino Atipat | |
| 2021 | "Ying Klai Ying Klua" (Thai: ยิ่งใกล้ยิ่งกลัว) | Chino Atipat | |
| 2021 | "For What?" | Ninew Suparerk | |
| 2021 | "Won't U Come Back?" | Bambam Niwirin | |
| 2022 | "What's the Matter" | LAZ1 | |

== Discography ==
=== Singles ===
==== Soundtrack appearances ====
| Year | Title | OST | Artist(s) | Ref. |
|---|---|---|---|---|
| 2024 | "Tilt" | 23.5 | With Milk Pansa | |
| 2025 | "My Only Champion" | Whale Store xoxo | With Milk Pansa | |
| 2025 | "One-Heart Deal" | Whale Store xoxo | With Milk Pansa | |
| 2026 | "Girl Rules" | Girl Rules | With Milk Pansa, Namtan Tipnaree, Film Rachanun, View Benyapa and Mim Rattanawadee | |
| 2026 | "Cross the Line" | Girl Rules | With Milk Pansa | |

=== Collaborations ===
| Year | Title | Notes | Ref. |
|---|---|---|---|
| 2024 | "Shot-Feel" | With Milk Pansa | |
| 2025 | "Blooming Blossom" | With Milk, Namtan, Film, Emi, Bonnie, View, Mim, June, Mewnich | |

== Other performances ==
=== Fan meetings ===
Solo

| Title | Date | Venue | Ref. |
|---|---|---|---|
| Inches From The Heart: Love Fan Meeting in Nanning | 9 March 2025 | Nanning Wharton International Hotel, Nanning | |
| Blossoms Shining: Love Fan Meeting in Suzhou | 27 July 2025 | Suzhou, China | |
| Whale Alley: Love Fan Event in Chongqing | 21 September 2025 | Chongqing, China | |
| Let's Meet With Excitement: Love Fan Sign in Shanghai | 21 June 2026 | Shanghai, China | |

Joint

| Title | Date | Venue | Notes | Ref. |
|---|---|---|---|---|
| MilkLove 1st FanMeeting in Hong Kong | 2 June 2024 | Hong Kong | With Milk | |
| MilkLove 1st FanMeeting in Taipei | 9 June 2024 | Taipei, Taiwan | With Milk | |
| GMMTV Fan Day 12 in Japan | 29 June 2024 | Tokyo, Japan | With Milk | |
| GMMTV Fan Day 12 in Japan | 39 June 2024 | Osaka, Japan | With Milk | |
| MilkLove 1st FanMeeting in Manila | 20 July 2024 | SM North EDSA Skydome Manila, Philippines | With Milk | |
| GMMTV Fan Day 14 in Vietnam | 10 August 2024 | Ho Chi Minh City, Vietnam | With Milk | |
| MilkLove 1st FanMeeting in Macau | 24 August 2024 | Macau, China | With Milk | |
| GMMTV Fan Day 15 in Singapore | 19 October 2024 | Singapore | With Milk | |
| MilkLove Fanmeeting in Taipei 2025 | 11 January 2025 | Zepp New Taipei | With Milk | |
| MilkLove Fan Meeting in Hong Kong: Heart Field Blossoms | 2 March 2025 | AXA Dreamland, Go Park, Hong Kong | With Milk | |
| Whale Store xoxo: First Come, First Love! | 25 June 2025 | SF World Cinema, CentralWorld | With Whale Store xoxo cast | |
| 25th Thai Festival: Tokyo; MilkLove Special Fan Meeting | 9 May 2025 | New Pier Hall, Tokyo | With Milk | |
| MilkLove - Connected Hearts in Vietnam | 2 August 2025 | District 10 Cultural Center | With Milk | |
| Whale Store xoxo Final Ep. Fan Meeting | 27 August 2025 | Siam Pavalai Royal Grand Theater, Siam Paragon | With Whale Store xoxo cast | |
| MilkLove Fan Meeting in Manila 2026 | 25 January 2026 | SM North EDSA Skydome Manila, Philippines | With Milk | |
| Girl Rules Fan Meeting in Seoul | 4 July 2026 | Kwangwoon University Donghae Culture Art Center | With Girl Rules cast | |
| Girl Rules Fan Meeting in Singapore | 1 August 2026 | D'Marquee, Downtown East | With Girl Rules cast | |
| Girl Rules Fan Meeting in Macau | 8 August 2026 | Macau Fisherman's Wharf Convention and Exhibition Center | With Girl Rules cast | |
| Girl Rules Fan Meeting in Taipei | 15 August 2026 | NCCU Art & Culture Center, Auditorium | With Girl Rules cast | |
| Girl Rules Fan Meeting in Manila | 3 October 2026 | SMX Convention Center Manila | With Girl Rules cast | |
| MilkLove Fan Meeting in Madrid | 12 December 2026 | Espacio Pablo IV Foundation | With Milk | |
| GMMTV Fan Day 40 in USA | 16 January 2027 | The Ridglea Theatre, Fort Worth | With Milk | |
| MilkLove 1st Fan Meeting in Mexico | 20 January 2027 | Teatro Metropólitan | With Milk | |
| A Place to Belong: MilkLove Fan Meeting in Brazil | 22 January 2027 | Teatro Bandeirantes | With Milk | |

=== Concerts ===
| Title | Date | Venue | Notes | Ref. |
|---|---|---|---|---|
| GMMTV Fanday in Bangkok 2024 | 1 December 2024 | Union Hall, Union Mall | With Milk | |
| Blush Blossom Fan Fest | 28–29 June 2025 | Union Hall, Union Mall | With Milk, Namtan, Film, Emi, Bonnie, View, Mim, June, Mewnich | |
| Blush Blossom Fan Fest in Macau | 30 November 2025 | Fisherman's Wharf Convention & Exhibition Center | With Milk, Namtan, Film, Emi, Bonnie, View, Mim, June, Mewnich | |
| Blush Blossom Fan Fest: Midnight Bloom | 13–14 June 2026 | BITEC Live | With Milk, Namtan, Film, Emi, Bonnie, View, Mim, Jan, JingJing, June, Mewnich, Pahn, Fond, Kapook, Ciize | |
| Blush Blossom Fan Fest: Midnight Bloom in Macau | 24 October 2026 | Fisherman's Wharf Convention & Exhibition Center | With Milk, Namtan, Film, Emi, Bonnie, View, Mim, Jan, JingJing, Pahn, Fond, Kapook, Ciize | |
| Blush Blossom Fan Fest: Midnight Bloom in Kaohsiung | 7 November 2026 | Kaohsiung Music Center | With Milk, Namtan, Film, Emi, Bonnie, View, Mim, Jan, JingJing, Pahn, Fond, Kapook, Ciize | |
| MilkLove Whimsical House Fancon | 15 November 2026 | Union Hall, Union Mall | With Milk, View, Prim, Tu, Kapook, Ciize, Hong, Tui | |

== Awards and nominations ==
| Year | Award | Category | Work | Result | Ref. |
|---|---|---|---|---|---|
| 2020 | 12th Nataraja Awards | Best Cast | 2gether: The Series | Nominated | |
| 2021 | Kazz Awards 2021 | Rising Star of the Year | | Won | |
| 2022 | Kazz Awards 2022 | Sao wai sai of the Year | | Won | |
| 2022 | Howe Awards 2022 | Howe New Generation Award | | Won | |
| 2024 | Howe Awards 2024 | The Best Couple Award with Milk Pansa | 23.5 | Nominated | |
| 2024 | Howe Awards 2024 | Hottest Actress Award | 23.5 | Nominated | |
| 2024 | 2024 WTW Most Popular Female Artist | Most Popular Female Artist | | Won | |
| 2024 | 2024 Thailand Headlines Person of the Year | Culture and Entertainment | | Won | |
| 2025 | The Viral Hits Awards 2025 | Best Yuri Duo of the Year with Milk Pansa | Whale Store XOXO | Won | |
| 2025 | NPBL Choice Awards 2025 | Actress of the Year | | Won | |
| 2025 | NPBL Choice Awards 2025 | Kiss Scene of the Year with Milk Pansa | Whale Store XOXO | Won | |
| 2025 | Hub Awards 2025 | Best Chemistry with Milk Pansa | Whale Store XOXO | Won | |
| 2025 | Hub Awards 2025 | Best Lead Couple (Characters) with Milk Pansa | WanMaewnam | Won | |
| 2025 | Hub Awards 2025 | Best Kiss Scene with Milk Pansa | WanMaewnam | Won | |
| 2025 | Hub Awards 2025 | Best Couple with Milk Pansa | | Won | |
| 2025 | Hub Awards 2025 | Best Actress | Whale Store XOXO | Won | |
| 2026 | SEC Awards 2026 | Favorite Couple/Ship with Milk Pansa | Whale Store XOXO | Won | |
| 2026 | SEC Awards 2026 | International Crush of the Year | | Nominated | |
| 2026 | Legend 100 List Social Club 2026 | Legend Category New Faces | | Won | |
| 2026 | Vogue Beauty Awards 2026 | Best Bright & Shine Corrector | twenty wendy | Won | |
| 2026 | Lifestyle Asia 50 Icons | Entertainment Leaders | | Won | |
