= Rachanun Mahawan =

Thai actress (born 2000)

- รชานันท์ มหาวรรณ์
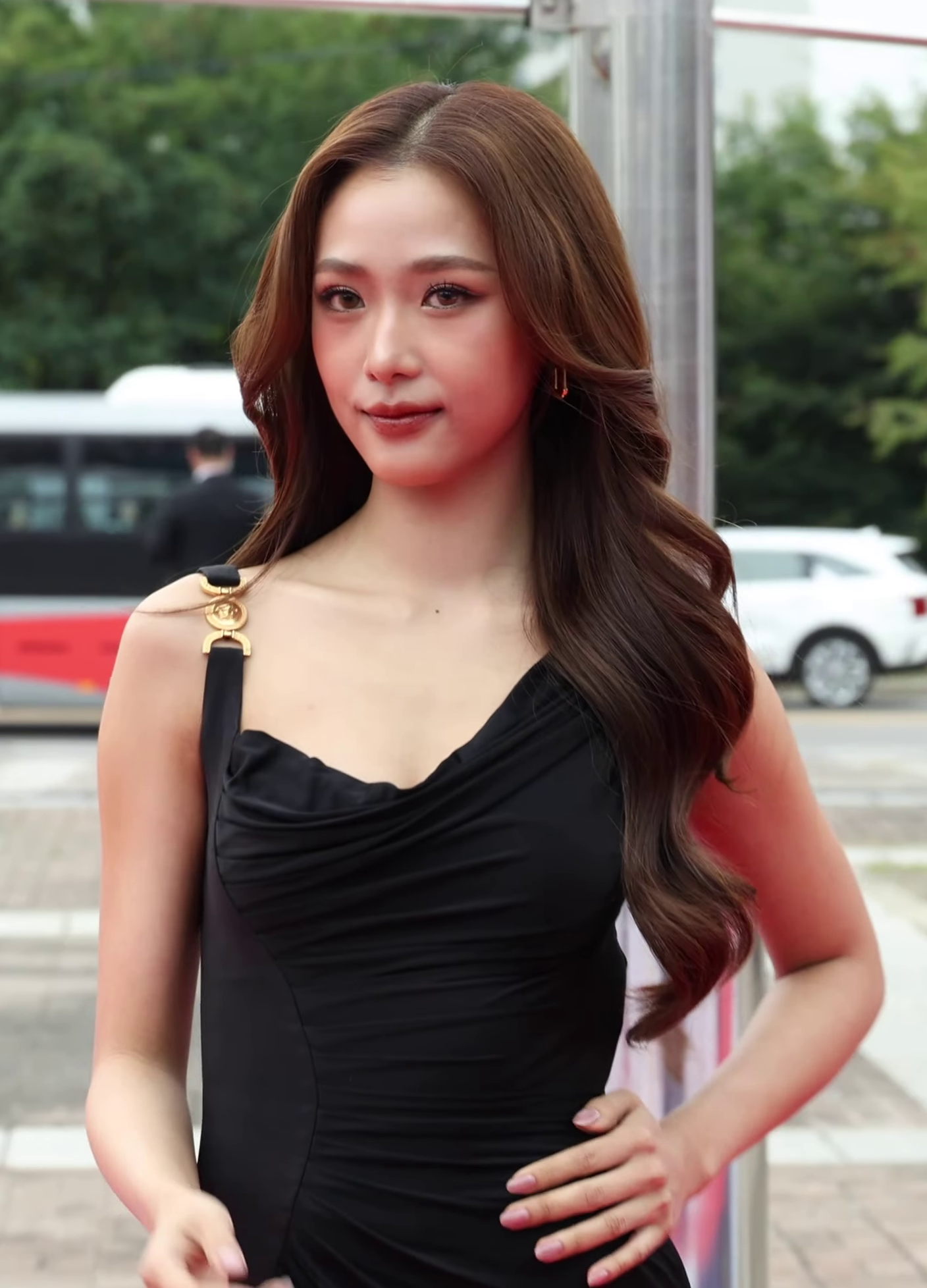
- Rachanun in October 2025
- Born: 14 July 2000 (age 26)
- Other name: Film (ฟิล์ม)
- Education: King Mongkut's University of Technology Thonburi
- Occupations: Actress; Model
- Years active: 2019–present
- Agent: GMMTV
- Known for: 2gether; Home School; My Precious; Pluto
- Website: gmm-tv.com

Rachanun Mahawan (Thai: รชานันท์ มหาวรรณ์; born 14 July 2000), nicknamed Film (Thai: ฟิล์ม), is a Thai actress. She first garnered attention for her role as Earn in the 2020 television series 2gether, before achieving wider recognition as Maki in the television series Home School and as Lin in the 2023 film My Precious, the Thai adaptation of the Taiwanese novel The Girl We Chased Together in Those Years by Giddens Ko. She gained further prominence for her portrayal of May Metawee in the 2024 girls' love series Pluto, for which she won the 20th Seoul International Drama Awards for Outstanding Asian Star.

== Education ==
Rachanun completed her secondary education at La Salle School Bangkok. Following high school, she enrolled at King Mongkut's University of Technology Thonburi (KMUTT), graduating in early 2023 with a Bachelor of Technology degree in Medical and Science Media from the School of Architecture and Design.

== Career ==
Rachanun entered the entertainment industry after winning the Go On Girl Star Search by Clean & Clear in 2019. She soon signed with GMMTV and made her television debut with a guest role in Dark Blue Kiss (2019). In 2020, she gained recognition for her supporting role as Earn in 2gether: The Series, reprising the role in Still 2gether (2020) and 2gether: The Movie (2021). She secured her first leading role as Toon in the miniseries The Comments (2021) before taking on various supporting and main roles across later television series.

In 2023, she landed her first major film role as Lin in the coming of age romance film My Precious, alongside her Midnight Series: Dirty Laundry costar Nanon Korapat. That same year, she received wider recognition for her leading role as Maki, an intelligent scholarship student, in the suspense-horror television series Home School.

She achieved further prominence for her leading sapphic role as May Metawee in the Thai girls' love television series Pluto (2024) alongside Namtan Tipnaree. Following the success of Pluto, she continued her on-screen partnership with Namtan in the romantic drama Girl Rules, starring alongside an ensemble cast that includes Milk Pansa, Love Pattranite, View Benyapa and Mim Rattanawadee. Her subsequent television work includes a supporting role in Moonshadow and upcoming starring roles alongside Namtan in the thriller drama series Her and Lost in Your Eyes.

== Filmography ==
=== Film ===
Year	Title	Role	Ref.
2021	2gether: The Movie	Earn	
2023	My Precious	Lin	

=== Television series ===
Key
†	Denotes television productions that have not yet been released

Year	Title	Role	Notes	Ref.
2019	Dark Blue Kiss	Namwan	Guest role	
2020	Angel Beside Me	Baitoey	Guest role	
2020	2gether	Earn	Supporting role	
2020	Still 2gether	Earn	Supporting role	
2020	I'm Tee, Me Too	Looksorn	Guest role	
2021	The Debut	Farn	Supporting role	
2021	The Comments	"Toon" Theerata	Main role	
2021	Not Me	Eugene	Supporting role	
2022	The Three GentleBros	"View" Nareeya	Main role	
2023	Midnight Series: Dirty Laundry	Neon	Main role	
2023	Double Savage	"Rung" Rungtawan	Main role	
2023	Home School	Maki	Main role	
2023	Wednesday Club	Tam	Main role	
2023	Last Twilight	Gee	Supporting role	
2024	My Precious The Series	Lin	Main role	
2024	Ploy's Yearbook	"Ploy" Pandara	Main role	
2024	Pluto	"May" Metawee Mekasiri	Main role	
2026	Girl Rules	Bambi Yanin	Main role	
2026	Moonshadow	Jay	Supporting role	
TBA	Her †	"Pan" Porpan	Main role	
TBA	Lost in Your Eyes †	Mild	Main role	
TBA	Itaewon Class: Thai Edition †	TBA	Main role	

=== Music video appearances ===
Year	Title	Artist	Ref.
2020	"อย่าเกลียดกันก็พอ" ("Just Don't Hate Each Other")	Lipta feat. Maiyarap	
2023	"รักแรก" ("First Love") (My Precious OST)	Nont Tanont	
2024	"นิยายเรื่องเธอ" ("Your Story") (Pluto OST)	Namtan Tipnaree	
2024	"Somewhere Only We Know" (Pluto OST)	Namtan Tipnaree	
2025	"ทัก" ("First Sight")	LYKN	
2026	"Black Card"	Phuwin Tangsakyuen	

== Discography ==
=== Singles ===
==== Collaborations ====
Year	Title	Notes	Ref.
2025	"ฤดูของเรา (Blooming Blossom)" (with Namtan, Milk, Love, Emi, Bonnie, View, Mim, June, Mewnich)	Blush Blossom Fan Fest	

==== Soundtrack appearances ====
Year	Title	Album	Label	Ref.
2024	"รักแรก (First Love) (หลิน Version)"	My Precious The Series OST	GMMTV Records	
2024	"เรื่องเล่าของเจ้าหญิง (A Princess' Tale)" (with Namtan Tipnaree)	Pluto OST	GMMTV Records	
2024	"พลูโต (Pluto)" (with Namtan Tipnaree)	Pluto OST	GMMTV Records	
2024	"รอนะ (Linger)"	Pluto OST	GMMTV Records	
2026	"Girl Rules" (with Namtan Tipnaree, Milk Pansa, Love Pattranite, View Benyapa & Mim Rattanawadee)	Girl Rules OST	GMMTV Records	
2026	"Favorite Toxic" (with Namtan Tipnaree)	Girl Rules OST	GMMTV Records	

== Fan meetings ==
Title	Date	Venue	Notes	Ref.
Kun-Gu 2gether Live on Stage	17–18 October 2020	Union Hall, Union Mall	With 2gether cast	
2gether The Movie First Premiere	10 November 2021	Siam Pavalai Royal Grand Theater, Siam Paragon	With 2gether: The Movie cast	
My Precious First Premiere	25 April 2023	Siam Pavalai Royal Grand Theater, Siam Paragon	With My Precious cast	
My Precious on Tour	27 April – 7 May 2023	SF Cinema	With My Precious cast	
My Precious Finale	13 June 2023	SF World Cinema, CentralWorld	With My Precious cast	
My Precious Gala Premiere and Fan Screening in Jakarta	3–4 July 2023	Cinepolis Senayan Park	With Nanon	
Last Twilight Final EP. Fan Meeting	26 January 2024	Siam Pavalai Royal Grand Theater, Siam Paragon	With Last Twilight cast	
Last Twilight New Dawn Live on Stage	30 March 2024	Union Hall, Union Mall	With Last Twilight cast	
Pluto Final EP. Fan Meeting	4 January 2025	Siam Pavalai Royal Grand Theater, Siam Paragon	With Pluto cast	
GMMTV Fanday 16 in Cambodia	26 January 2025	Aeon Mall Sen Sok City, Phnom Penh	With Namtan	
Film 1st Fan Meeting in Nanning	16 February 2025	Nanning International Convention and Exhibition Center	—N/a	
NamtanFilm Princess's Tale Fan Meeting	8–9 March 2025	MCC Hall, The Mall Lifestore Bangkapi	With Namtan	
My Muses - NamtanFilm 1st Fan Meeting in Vietnam	29 March 2025	Ben Thanh Theater, Ho Chi Minh City	With Namtan	
Film Fan Meeting in Fuzhou	13 April 2025	Strait Culture and Art Centre Opera House	—N/a	
NamtanFilm Fan Meeting in Macau	20 April 2025	The Venetian Theatre	With Namtan	
The 25th Thai Festival Tokyo 2025 Special Fan Meeting	9 May 2025	New Pier Hall	With Namtan	
Dream Vacation - Film Fan Appreciation Party	1 June 2025	Hangzhou	—N/a	
NamtanFilm 1st Fan Meeting in Manila	18 July 2025	UP Theater	With Namtan	
NamtanFilm 1st Fan Meeting in Hong Kong	10 August 2025	AXA Dreamland, Go Park	With Namtan	
NamtanFilm 1st Fan Meeting in Singapore	1 November 2025	GVmax, VivoCity	With Namtan	
NamtanFilm Fan Meeting in Taipei	18 January 2026	Zepp New Taipei	With Namtan	
Girl Rules: The 1st Rule	9 March 2026	MCC Hall, Floor 3, The Mall Lifestore Bangkapi	With Girl Rules cast	
GMMTV Fanday 30 in Osaka	15 March 2026	Cool Japan Park Osaka WW Hall	With Namtan	
NamtanFilm Fan Meeting in Hong Kong 2026	5 April 2026	AXA Dreamland, Go Park	With Namtan	
Girl Rules Final EP. Fan Meeting	1 June 2026	Iconsiam Hall, 7th Floor Iconsiam	With Girl Rules cast	
NamtanFilm 1st Fan Meeting in Madrid	21 June 2026	La Estación - Gran Teatro CaixaBank Príncipe Pio	With Namtan	
Girl Rules Fan Meeting in Seoul	4 July 2026	Dongnae Culture Art Centre, Kwangwoon University	With Girl Rules cast	
Girl Rules Fan Meeting in Singapore	1 August 2026	D’Marquee, Downtown East	With Girl Rules cast	
Girl Rules Fan Meeting in Macau	8 August 2026	Fisherman's Wharf Conference Exhibition Center, Hall Two	With Girl Rules cast	
Girl Rules Fan Meeting in Taipei	15 August 2026	NCCU Art & Culture Center, Taipei City	With Girl Rules cast	
Girl Rules Fan Meeting in Manila	3 October 2026	Function Room 3-5, 2nd Floor, SMX Convention Center	With Girl Rules cast	
Double Trouble with Lunar: NamtanFilm & Lunar Fan Meeting in Ho Chi Minh City	13 December 2026	C30 Hoa Binh Stage, Ho Chi Minh City	With Namtan	
Film & Lunar Fan Meeting in Kuala Lumpur	20 December 2026	JioSpace, Kuala Lumpur	With LUNAR	
NamtanFilm Fan Meeting in Seoul	13 February 2027	Cube Convention Center	With Namtan	

== Concerts ==
Title	Date	Venue	Notes	Ref.
Blush Blossom Fan Fest	28–29 June 2025	Union Hall, Union Mall	With Namtan, Milk, Love, Emi, Bonnie, View, Mim, June, Mewnich	
Blush Blossom Fan Fest in Macau	30 November 2025	Fisherman's Wharf Conference Exhibition Center	With Namtan, Milk, Love, Emi, Bonnie, View, Mim, June, Mewnich	
Blush Blossom Fan Fest: Midnight Bloom	13–14 June 2026	BITEC Live	With Namtan, Milk, Love, Emi, Bonnie, View, Mim, Jan, JingJing, June, Mewnich, Pahn, Fond, Kapook, Ciize	
JuniorMark Sunny Moon Concert	9 August 2026	BITEC Live	With Junior, Mark, Prem, Nani, Tay	
Blush Blossom Fan Fest: Midnight Bloom in Macau	24 October 2026	Fisherman's Wharf Conference Exhibition Center	With Namtan, Milk, Love, Emi, Bonnie, View, Mim, Jan, JingJing, Pahn, Fond, Kapook, Ciize	
Blush Blossom Fan Fest: Midnight Bloom in Kaohsiung	7 November 2026	Kaohsiung Music Center	With Namtan, Milk, Love, Emi, Bonnie, View, Mim, Jan, JingJing, Pahn, Fond, Kapook, Ciize	
NamtanFilm Glamorous Fancon	13–14 November 2026	Union Hall, Union Mall	With Namtan	

== Awards and nominations ==
Award nominations for Rachanun Mahawan
Year	Award	Category	Nominee(s)	Result	Ref.
2021	Kazz Awards 2021	Rising Actress of the Year		Nominated	
2023	Kazz Awards 2023	Sao Wai Sai of the Year		Nominated	
2024	Kazz Awards 2024	Popular Female Teenage Award		Nominated	
2024	Maya TV Awards 2024	Female Rising Star of the Year		Nominated	
2025	Kazz Awards 2025	The Best Actress of the Year		Nominated	
2025	Thailand Y Content Awards 2024	Couple of the Year with Namtan Tipnaree	Pluto	Nominated	
2025	Thailand Y Content Awards 2024	Best Leading Actress	Pluto	Nominated	
2025	20th Seoul International Drama Awards	Outstanding Asian Star (Thailand)	Pluto	Won	
2025	ContentAsia Awards 2025	Viewers' Choice Awards – Favorite Actress (Thailand)	Pluto	Won	
2025	Feed x Khaosod Awards 2025	Girl's Love Actress of the Year	Pluto	Won	
2025	Y Entertain Awards 2025	Princess of Girls’ Love	Pluto	Nominated	
2025	Maya TV Awards 2025	Rising Star Female of the Year	Pluto	Won	
2025	Maya TV Awards 2025	Female Couple of the Year with Namtan Tipnaree	Pluto	Nominated	
2025	Howe Awards 2025	Shining Female Award	Pluto	Won	
2026	Japan Expo Thailand Award 2026	Actress Award with Namtan Tipnaree	Pluto	Won	
2026	Y Universe Awards 2025	Rising Star (Popular Vote) with Namtan Tipnaree	Pluto	Nominated	
2026	Y Universe Awards 2025	The Best Couple with Namtan Tipnaree	Pluto	Won	
2026	Thairath Awards 2025	Best GL of the Year with Namtan Tipnaree	Pluto	Nominated	
2026	Sanook Top of the Year 2025	Rising Star of 2025	Pluto	Nominated	
2026	Sanook Top of the Year 2025	Rising Female Couple with Namtan Tipnaree	Pluto	Nominated	
2026	Kazz Awards 2026	People of the Year		Won	
2026	Feed x Khaosod Awards 2026	Best Chemistry of the Year with Namtan Tipnaree		Nominated	
