= Rutricha Phapakithi =

Thai actress and singer (born 1999)

- รัตท์ริชา ประภากิติ
- Born: Apichaya Saejung (อภิชญา แซ่จัง); September 23, 1999 (age 27); Bangkok, Thailand
- Other name: Ciize (ไซซี)
- Education: Bangkok University
- Occupations: Actress; Singer; Model
- Years active: 2015–present
- Agent: GMMTV
- Known for: Alpha in 23.5; Pang in Pluto; Proud in Enemies with Benefits
- Musical career
- Genre: T-pop
- Instrument: Vocals
- Labels: GMMTV Records; Riser Music
- Formerly of: Sizzy
- Website: www.gmm-tv.com/artists/view/24/

Rutricha Phapakithi (Thai: รัตท์ริชา ประภากิติ; born 23 September 1999), formerly Apichaya Saejung (Thai: อภิชญา แซ่จัง), nicknamed Ciize (Thai: ไซซี), is a Thai actress and singer. She is a former member of the girl group Sizzy under Riser Music. She gained recognition for her performances in various television series, including YOUniverse (2018), 23.5 (2024), Pluto (2024), and Enemies with Benefits (2026).

== Names ==
Rutricha was born in Bangkok, Thailand, as Apichaya Saejung. In July 2023, she announced on Twitter that she was changing her legal name to Rutricha Phapakithi because someone else shared her exact birth name.

She is of Thai Chinese descent, and her Chinese name is Zeng Xishi (Chinese: 曾西施; pinyin: Céng Xī Shī).

== Education ==
Rutricha graduated from Satriwitthaya 2 School before attending Bangkok University, where she earned a bachelor's degree in business Chinese in 2022.

== Career ==
Rutricha made her acting debut in 2015 with a supporting role as Cherry in the television series Wonder Teacher. She subsequently took on various roles in several series, including May in Kiss: The Series (2016) and Mochi in My Dear Loser: Edge of 17 (2017).

In 2018, she landed her first main role as Nik in the web series YOUniverse alongside Wachirawit Ruangwiwat, and also played Ching in 'Cause You're My Boy. The following year, she portrayed Onnie in Boy For Rent as the best friend of Smile, who was played by Sananthachat Thanapatpisal. She also played New Year, a high school student who dies from a hate gift, in A Gift For Whom You Hate.

During this period, she signed with GMMTV and debuted as an idol in the girl group Sizzy, originally known as Sissy, in November 2019. She remained with the group until their official disbandment in October 2024.

Her television work continued in 2020 with roles as Lyla in Who Are You and Pang in Tonhon Chonlatee. In 2021, she played Thong Hansa, a village chief's daughter, in The Prince Who Turns into a Frog, and secured a main role as Nan in the mystery teen miniseries The Comments. She also appeared as Cin in 46 Days alongside several other television appearances.

In 2024, she appeared in Beauty Newbie before achieving wider recognition for portraying Alpha, an academically gifted student council president and the older sister of Ongsa (Pansa Vosbein), in the girls' love television series 23.5. That same year, she played Fai in We Are and Rak in Peaceful Property.

She gained further prominence later in 2024 as Pang, a friend caught up in a messy love triangle with Pim (Ploynira Hiruntaveesin) and Jan (Preeyaphat Lawsuwansiri), in the girls' love television series Pluto. Rounding out her 2024 projects, she played Baifern in ThamePo: Heart That Skips a Beat alongside various music video appearances.

In 2025, she went viral for her fluency in Thai, English, and Chinese while serving as an event host for "Chuang Busking Day", which showcased trainees from Chuang Asia: Season 2. Later that year, she played Jin in Boys in Love. Her earlier work in Pluto also marked her first screen collaboration with Ploynira Hiruntaveesin, whom she subsequently joined for special appearances in Revamp The Undead Story and Girl Rules before they co-starred in the 2026 series Enemies with Benefits, bringing Rutricha wider public recognition.

== Filmography ==
=== Television series ===
Key
†	Denotes television productions that have not yet been released

Year	Title	Role	Notes	Ref.
2015	Wonder Teacher	Cherry	Supporting role	
2016	Kiss: The Series	May	Supporting role	
2016	Lovey Dovey	Koi	Supporting role	
2017	Water Boyy	Namkhaeng	Supporting role	
2017	My Dear Loser: Edge of 17	Mochi	Supporting role	
2017	Teenage Mom: The Series	Mint	Supporting role	
2018	YOUniverse	Nik	Main role	
2018	'Cause You're My Boy	Ching	Supporting role	
2019	Boy For Rent	Onnie	Supporting role	
2019	A Gift For Whom You Hate	New Year	Supporting role	
2020	Who Are You	Lyla Rojkija	Supporting role	
2020	Tonhon Chonlatee	Pang	Supporting role	
2021	The Prince Who Turns into a Frog	Thong Hansa	Supporting role	
2021	The Comments	Nan	Main role	
2021	46 Days	Cin	Supporting role	
2022	Star & Sky: Star in My Mind	Tingting	Supporting role	
2022	Mama Gogo	Fifa	Supporting role	
2022	The Warp Effect	Liu	Supporting role	
2024	Beauty Newbie	Milin	Guest role	
2024	23.5	Alpha	Supporting role	
2024	We Are	Fai	Supporting role	
2024	Peaceful Property	Rak	Guest role	
2024	Pluto	Pang	Supporting role	
2024	ThamePo: Heart That Skips a Beat	Baifern	Supporting role	
2025	Boys in Love	Jin	Supporting role	
2025	Revamp The Undead Story	Mariah	Guest role	
2026	Girl Rules	Airy	Supporting role	
2026	Enemies With Benefits	Proud	Supporting role	
2026	Scarlet Heart Ullavee	Lha / Eva	Supporting role	
TBA	Ditto †	Lalil	Supporting role	
TBA	Be Mine: Be My Baby! †	Sitang	Main role	

=== Television show ===
Year	Title	Network	Notes	Ref.
2018–2019	#TEAMGIRL	GMM 25		

=== Music video appearances ===
Year	Title	Artist	Ref.
2012	"คิดถึงได้ไหม"	MIN	
2017	"พรุ่งนี้ทุกวัน" (Water Boyy OST)	Chatchawit Techarukpong (Victor)	
2018	"จักรวาลเธอ" (YOUniverse) (YOUniverse OST)	Korapat Kirdpan (Nanon)	
2018	"L.O.V.E." (#PLAY2project)	Paradox	
2019	"กุหลาบพิษ" (A Gift For Whom You Hate OST)	Paper Planes x Oui Buddha Bless	
2023	"Safe Zone" (The Warp Effect OST)	Harit Cheewagaroon (Sing)	
2025	"แค่เธอไม่รัก" (LOVE LEFT ME BEHIND)	Rathavit Kijworalak (Plan) ft. NICECNX, MIGBIZZY	
2025	"ผิดแผน" (FOUL)	Kantapon Jindataweephol (Offroad) ft. SMEW	
2025	"Wondering"	BamBam	

== Discography ==
=== Soundtrack appearances ===
Year	Title	Soundtrack	Label	Ref.
2022	"ว่างอยู่ (Available)" with Jan Ployshompoo	Mama Gogo OST	GMMTV Records	
2026	"ไม่ชอบเลยที่ชอบเธอ (I don’t like that I like you)" with Kapook Ploynira	Enemies with Benefits OST	GMMTV Records	

=== Concerts ===
Title	Date	Venue	Notes	Ref.
Get Rising to RISER	May 5, 2023	Centralworld, Square A	With Krist, Bright, Nanon, Sizzy, LYKN	
Blush Blossom Fan Fest: Midnight Bloom	June 13–14, 2026	BITEC LIVE	With Kapook, Milk, Love, Namtan, Film, Emi, Bonnie, View, Mim, Jan, JingJing, June, Mewnich, Pahn, Fond	
Blush Blossom Fan Fest: Midnight Bloom in Macau	October 24, 2026	Fisherman’s Wharf Convention & Exhibition Center	With Kapook, Milk, Love, Namtan, Film, Emi, Bonnie, View, Mim, Jan, JingJing, Pahn, Fond	
Blush Blossom Fan Fest: Midnight Bloom in Kaohsiung	November 7, 2026	Kaohsiung Music Center	With Kapook, Milk, Love, Namtan, Film, Emi, Bonnie, View, Mim, Jan, JingJing, Pahn, Fond	
MilkLove Whimsical House Fancon	November 15, 2026	Union Hall, Union Mall	With Milk, Love, Kapook, Hong, Tui, View, Prim, Tu	

== Awards ==
Year	Award	Category	Work	Result	Ref.
2020	Zoom Dara Awards 2020	Popular Single	"เปลี่ยนคะแนนเป็นแฟนได้ไหม" (Love Score) by Sizzy x Nanon	Won	
2021	Kazz Awards 2021	Popular Young Woman of The Year		Won	
2021	Kazz Awards 2021	Female Teenage of the Year		Nominated	
