= Ploynira Hiruntaveesin =

Thai actress (born 1994)

- พลอยนิรา หิรัญทวีศิลป์
- Born: Phatchara Tubthong (พัชรา ทับทอง); October 29, 1994 (age 32); Bangkok, Thailand
- Other name: Kapook (กระปุก)
- Education: Bangkok University
- Occupation: Actress
- Years active: 2016–present
- Agent: GMMTV
- Known for: Mim in The Player; Judy in The Trainee; Pim in Pluto
- Height: 167 cm (5 ft 5 1/2 in)
- Website: GMMTV Artists

Ploynira Hiruntaveesin (Thai: พลอยนิรา หิรัญทวีศิลป์; born 29 October 1994), formerly Phatchara Tubthong (Thai: พัชรา ทับทอง), nicknamed Kapook (Thai: กระปุก), is a Thai actress. She gained recognition for her performances in several Thai television dramas, including F4 Thailand: Boys Over Flowers (2021), The Trainee (2024), Pluto (2024), and Enemies with Benefits (2026).

== Early life and education ==
Ploynira was born in Bangkok, Thailand as Phatchara Tubthong. She has an older sister, former actress Patcharee Tubthong (Join), and a younger brother.

In October 2023, she revealed that she had legally changed her name to Ploynira Hiruntaveesin a month prior. She explained that she changed it for peace of mind after discovering negative associations with her former name online, adding that she was very happy with the choice.

Ploynira completed her secondary education at Prasarnmit Demonstration School, Srinakharinwirot University. She later earned a bachelor's degree in marketing from Bangkok University.

== Career ==
Ploynira made her acting debut in 2016 with a supporting role as Orn in the television series Senior Secret Love: My Lil Boy, reprising her role later that year in the sequel Senior Secret Love: My Lil Boy 2. After appearing in several supporting roles, she landed her first main role as Pan opposite Tanont Chumroen in Love Songs Love Series: Sabai Sabai.

After joining GMMTV, she took on multiple television roles in 2020, portraying Dujao in Angel Beside Me, Yogurt in My Bubble Tea, Music in Friend Zone 2: Dangerous Area, Amp in Tonhon Chonlatee, and Laweng in Khun Mae Mafia.

In 2021, she played Jane, the leader of a trio that bullies the female protagonist Gorya, played by Tontawan Tantivejakul, in F4 Thailand: Boys Over Flowers. That same year, she took on a main antagonistic role as Mim in The Player, followed by appearances in several subsequent television series.

In 2024, she expanded into sapphic drama roles, playing Judy in The Trainee opposite Ba-Mhee (Kanyarat Ruangrung) and Pim in Pluto opposite Pang (Rutricha Phapakithi). Pluto also marked her first screen work alongside Rutricha Phapakithi, whom she subsequently joined for special appearances in Revamp The Undead Story and Girl Rules before starring together in the 2026 series Enemies with Benefits, which brought Ploynira wider public recognition.

== Filmography ==
Key
†	Denotes television productions that have not yet been released

=== Television series ===
Year	Title	Role	Notes	Ref.
2016	Senior Secret Love: My Lil Boy	Orn	Supporting role	
2016	Senior Secret Love: My Lil Boy 2	Orn	Supporting role	
2017	Roi Pa Wai Duay Rak	Jandee	Supporting role	
2018	Kiss Me Again	Nicole	Supporting role	
2018	Sanae Rak Nang Cin	Namwan	Supporting role	
2018	Rup Thong	Som	Guest role	
2018	Seua Chanee Gayng: Freshy	Deer	Guest role	
2018	Love Songs Love Series: Sabai Sabai	Pan	Main role	
2018	Our Skyy: Tee-Mork	Nae	Supporting role	
2019	Rak Nee Hua Jai Rao Jong	Lalita	Supporting role	
2020	Angel Beside Me	Dujao	Supporting role	
2020	My Bubble Tea	Yogurt	Supporting role	
2020	Friend Zone 2: Dangerous Area	Music	Supporting role	
2020	Tonhon Chonlatee	Amp	Supporting role	
2020	Khun Mae Mafia	Laweng	Supporting role	
2021	A Tale of Thousand Stars	Jeab	Guest role	
2021	Girl2K	Punpun	Guest role	
2021	Nabi, My Stepdarling	Chonlada	Supporting role	
2021	Fish upon the Sky	Namphueng	Guest role	
2021	Oh My Boss	Pinn	Supporting role	
2021	Irresistible	Gina	Supporting role	
2021	F4 Thailand: Boys Over Flowers	Jane	Supporting role	
2021	The Player	Mim	Main role	
2022	Astrophile	Kewalin	Supporting role	
2022	Good Old Days: Story 5 - Love Wins	Miw	Supporting role	
2022	The Three GentleBros	Vivi	Supporting role	
2023	Midnight Series: Dirty Laundry	Momay	Supporting role	
2023	The Jungle	Puinun	Supporting role	
2024	Emergency Couple	Alice	Supporting role	
2024	Ploy's Yearbook	Jaochan	Supporting role	
2024	The Trainee	Judy	Supporting role	
2024	Pluto	Pim	Supporting role	
2024	ThamePo Heart That Skips a Beat	Music Max host	Guest role	
2025	Ossan's Love Thailand	Chicha	Supporting role	
2025	Break Up Service	Cupid	Guest role	
2025	Memoir of Rati	Yingpa	Supporting role	
2025	Revamp The Undead Story	Elise	Supporting role	
2026	My Romance Scammer	Nana	Supporting role	
2026	Girl Rules	Zee	Supporting role	
2026	Love You Teacher	Pang	Guest role	
2026	Enemies With Benefits	Tangkwa	Supporting role	
2026	A Dog and a Plane	Phailin	Supporting role	
TBA	Bake Love Feeling †	Tangkwa	Supporting role	
TBA	Shooting Stars †	Praew	Supporting role	
TBA	Be Mine: Be My Baby! †	Jaojay	Main role	

=== Movies ===
Year	Title	Role	Notes	Ref.
2018	As Long As I Breathe	Aom	Short film for "ตราบที่ยังหายใจ" by Ae Jirakorn	
2019	Friend Zone	Flight attendant	Guest role	

== Discography ==
=== Soundtrack appearances ===
Year	Title	Soundtrack	Label	Ref.
2026	"ไม่ชอบเลยที่ชอบเธอ (I don’t like that I like you)" with Ciize Rutricha	Enemies with Benefits OST	GMMTV Records	

=== Concerts ===
Title	Date	Venue	Notes	Ref.
Blush Blossom Fan Fest: Midnight Bloom	June 13–14, 2026	BITEC LIVE	With Ciize, Milk, Love, Namtan, Film, Emi, Bonnie, View, Mim, Jan, JingJing, June, Mewnich, Pahn, Fond	
Blush Blossom Fan Fest: Midnight Bloom in Macau	October 24, 2026	Fisherman’s Wharf Convention & Exhibition Center	With Ciize, Milk, Love, Namtan, Film, Emi, Bonnie, View, Mim, Jan, JingJing, Pahn, Fond	
Blush Blossom Fan Fest: Midnight Bloom in Kaohsiung	November 7, 2026	Kaohsiung Music Center	With Ciize, Milk, Love, Namtan, Film, Emi, Bonnie, View, Mim, Jan, JingJing, Pahn, Fond	
MilkLove Whimsical House Fancon	November 15, 2026	Union Hall, Union Mall	With Milk, Love, Ciize, Hong, Tui, View, Prim, Tu	

== Awards and nominations ==
Year	Award	Category	Result	Reference
2024	TikTok Awards Thailand 2024	Celebrity Creator of the Year	Nominated	
