= Wanwimol Jaenasavamethee =

Thai actress (born 2000)

- วรรณวิมล เจนอัศวเมธี
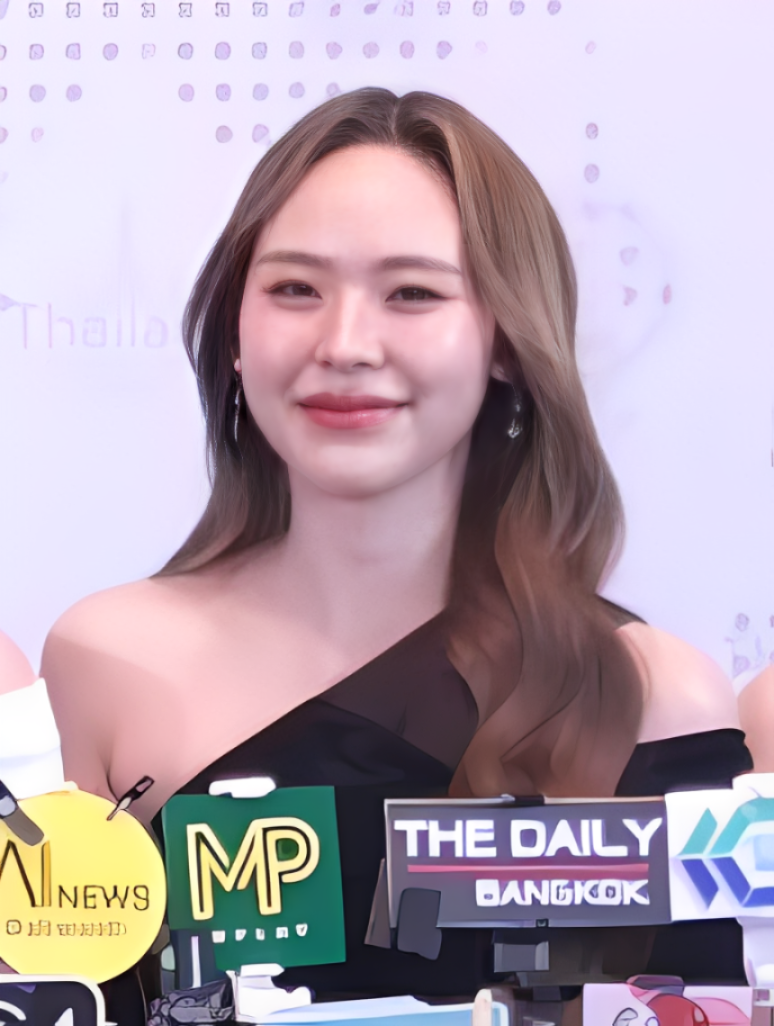
- Wanwimol in December 2025
- Born: 19 April 2000 (age 26); Samut Prakan, Thailand
- Other name: June (จูน)
- Education: Srinakharinwirot University
- Occupations: Actress; Youtuber
- Years active: 2018–present
- Agent: GMMTV
- Known for: Sangnuea in Turn Left Turn Right; Hana in F4 Thailand: Boys Over Flowers; Luna in 23.5
- Height: 162 cm (5 ft 4 in)

Wanwimol Jaenasavamethee (Thai: วรรณวิมล เจนอัศวเมธี; born 19 April 2000), nicknamed June (Thai: จูน), is a Thai actress. She is known for her roles as Sangnuea in Turn Left Turn Right (2020), Hana in F4 Thailand: Boys Over Flowers (2021), and Luna in 23.5 (2024).

== Early life and education ==
Wanwimol was born in Samut Prakan, Thailand. She completed her secondary education at Ratwinit Bangkaeo School. In 2022, she graduated from Srinakharinwirot University, earning a bachelor's degree in Computer Innovation for Communication from the College of Social Communication Innovation.

== Career ==
Wanwimol entered the entertainment industry after winning the "Go On Girl Star Search by Clean & Clear" contest in 2018, subsequently signing a contract with the production agency GMMTV. She made her acting debut that same year with a minor role as Koi in the series The Gifted (2018), followed by an appearance in Boy For Rent (2019).

In 2020, she portrayed Sangnuea, the girlfriend of Tai (Korapat Kirdpan) in the television series Turn Left Turn Right (2020). The following year, she appeared as Dujdao in Mr. Lipstick and gained attention for her role in F4 Thailand: Boys Over Flowers (2021) as Hana, a character who initially befriends the protagonist Gorya (Tontawan Tantivejakul) before later betraying her.

Wanwimol landed her first main television role in 2022 as Iris, one of the grandchildren of Kannika (Duangdao Jarujinda), in the family drama The War of Flowers. Later that year, she played Nink in the drama series 10 Years Ticket, followed by a role as Nubdao in the romantic drama Dangerous Romance (2023).

In 2024, she gained wider recognition after starring as Luna, a lesbian character in the Thai girls' love television series 23.5, appearing alongside Benyapa Jeenprasom. That same year, she made her feature film debut as Nita in the romantic action film Love You to Debt. Her other 2024 television credits included roles as Prakaimook in Ploy's Yearbook and as Airy in High School Frenemy.

In 2025, she starred as Tonnam in the television series Whale Store xoxo, performing opposite Nannaphas Loetnamchoetsakun, with whom she also collaborated on the series soundtrack single "Lost In Between (เหนื่อยจะถาม)". That same year, she was cast as Cherreen in Dare You to Death.

== Filmography ==
Key
†	Denotes films that have not yet been released

=== Films ===
Year	Title	Role	Ref.
2024	Love You to Debt	Nita	

=== Television series ===
Year	Title	Role	Notes	Ref.
2018	The Gifted	Koi	Guest role	
2019	Boy For Rent	Bonne	Guest role	
2020	Turn Left Turn Right	Sangnuea	Supporting role	
2020	2gether	Wan	Guest role	
2020	Who Are You	June	Guest role	
2020	Girl Next Room: Richy Rich	Fahsai	Supporting role	
2020	My Gear and Your Gown	Pang	Guest role	
2021	Mr. Lipstick	Dujdao	Supporting role	
2021	F4 Thailand: Boys Over Flowers	Hana	Supporting role	
2022	The War of Flowers	Iris	Main role	
2022	The Three GentleBros	Rata	Supporting role	
2022	Never Let Me Go	Maggie	Supporting role	
2022	10 Years Ticket	Nink	Supporting role	
2023	Dangerous Romance	Nubdao	Supporting role	
2023	Faceless Love	Thanya	Supporting role	
2024	23.5	Luna	Supporting role	
2024	Ploy's Yearbook	Prakaimook	Supporting role	
2024	High School Frenemy	Airy	Supporting role	
2025	Whale Store xoxo	Tonnam	Supporting role	
2025	Dare You to Death	Cherreen	Supporting role	
TBA	My Professional Boyfriend †	TBA	Supporting role	

=== Music video appearances ===
Year	Title	Artist	Ref.
2026	"Story Together"	iZ	

== Discography ==
=== Singles ===
==== Collaborations ====
Year	Title	Notes
2025	"ฤดูของเรา (Blooming Blossom)" (with Namtan, Film, Milk, Love, Emi, Bonnie, Mewnich, View, Mim)	Blush Blossom Fan Fest

==== Soundtrack appearances ====
Year	Title	Album	Label	Ref.
2025	"เหนื่อยจะถาม (Lost In Between)" (with Mewnich Nannaphas)	Whale Store xoxo OST	GMMTV Records	

== Concerts and fanmeetings ==
Title	Date	Venue	Notes	References
Never Let Me Go Final EP. Fan Meeting	February 28, 2023	True Icon Hall, Iconsiam, Bangkok	With Never Let Me Go cast	
Dangerous Romance Final EP. Fan Meeting	November 3, 2023	Ultra Arena, Show DC, Bangkok	With Dangerous Romance cast	
23.5 Lovtitude Final EP. Fan Meeting	May 24, 2024	Siam Pavalai Royal Grand Theater, Siam Paragon, Bangkok	With 23.5 cast	
June's Lover - June Wanwimol Fan Meeting in Vietnam	October 5, 2024	Ben Thanh Theater, Ho Chi Minh City, Vietnam	—N/a	
High School Frenemy Final EP. Fan Meeting	December 3, 2024	Siam Pavalai Royal Grand Theater, Siam Paragon, Bangkok	With High School Frenemy cast	
Blush Blossom Fan Fest	June 28–29, 2025	Union Hall, Union Mall	With Mewnich, Milk, Love, Namtan, Film, Emi, Bonnie, View, Mim	
Blush Blossom Fan Fest in Macau	November 30, 2025	Fisherman’s Wharf Convention & Exhibition Center, Macau	With Mewnich, Milk, Love, Namtan, Film, Emi, Bonnie, View, Mim	
Blush Blossom Fan Fest: Midnight Bloom	June 13–14, 2026	BITEC LIVE	With Mewnich, Milk, Love, Namtan, Film, Emi, Bonnie, View, Mim, Jan JingJing, Pahn, Fond, Kapook, Ciize	
