= Pattraphus Borattasuwan =

Thai actress and singer (born 2004)

- ภัทราภัสร์ โบรัชตะสุวรรณ์
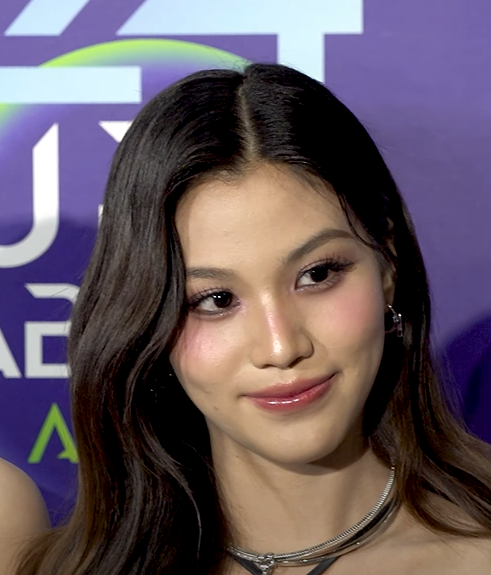
- Pattraphus in April 2024
- Born: Pussarasorn Bosuwan; 27 January 2004 (age 22); Thailand
- Other name: Bonnie (บอนนี่)
- Education: Srinakharinwirot University
- Occupations: Actress; singer; model
- Years active: 2024–present
- Agent: GMMTV
- Known for: Peeta in High School Frenemy; Dokrak in Us; Lookplub in Me and Thee
- Height: 164 cm (5 ft 4 1/2 in)

Pattraphus Borattasuwan (Thai: ภัทราภัสร์ โบรัชตะสุวรรณ์; born 27 January 2004), formerly Pussarasorn Bosuwan (Thai: ภัสรสรณ์ บ่อสุวรรณ), nicknamed Bonnie (Thai: บอนนี่), is a Thai actress and singer. She is signed with the production agency GMMTV and its music label sub-brand Riser Music. She began her acting career with a supporting role as Peeta in the 2024 television series High School Frenemy, which earned her the 2025 Mint Award for Rookie of the Year. She gained further prominence for her lead role as Dokrak in the girls' love series Us (2025) and as Lookplub in Me and Thee (2025).

== Early life and education ==
Pattraphus was born on 27 January 2004 in Thailand. She completed her secondary education at Rajini School. She currently attends the College of Social Communication Innovation at Srinakharinwirot University, where she majors in Cyber Business Management.

In January 2025, GMMTV released the official poster for the television series Us, revealing that she had changed her legal name from Pussarasorn Bosuwan to Pattraphus Borattasuwan. The agency subsequently updated her profile on its official website.

== Career ==
Before entering the entertainment industry, Pattraphus worked as a commercial model for several local brands. Notably, she served as a model and brand ambassador for Twenty Wendy, a cosmetics brand founded by actress and fellow future GMMTV artist Pattranite Limpatiyakorn (Love).

In 2023, Pattraphus was scouted by a casting agent on social media and invited to audition. After successfully passing, she signed a contract with GMMTV and made her acting debut the following year as Peeta in High School Frenemy (2024).

In 2025, she achieved wider recognition after starring opposite Thasorn Klinnium (Emi) in the Thai girls' love television series Us, playing the lead role of Dokrak. The same year, she received positive reviews for her supporting role as Lookplub, the younger sister of Peach, in the boys' love television series Me and Thee (2025).

In 2026, Pattraphus branched out into music under Riser Music, partnering with Emi to form the vocal duo EmiBonnie. The duo made their official musical debut on 24 February 2026 with the release of their digital single "Fall For You (ยิ่งชิดยิ่งคิด)". Her television projects that same year featured roles in the romantic drama Girl Rules and Peach and Me. She also reunited with Emi to headline the drama series Moonshadow, starring in the lead role of Key. In December 2026, she marked her first stage production appearance by portraying Ying in The Love of Siam: The Musical at the Muangthai Rachadalai Theatre.

== Acting credits ==
Key
†	Denotes television productions that have not yet been released

=== Television series ===
Year	Title	Role	Network	Notes	Ref.
2024	High School Frenemy	"Peeta" Peechaya	GMM 25	Supporting role	
2025	Us	"Dokrak" Kanda Chitrarak	GMM 25	Main role	
2025	Me and Thee	"Lookplub" Panachakorn Janekit	GMM 25	Supporting role	
2026	Girl Rules	Baipor Roongruengsook	GMM 25	Guest role	
2026	Peach and Me	"Lookplub" Panachakorn Janekit	GMM 25	Supporting role	
2026	Moonshadow	"Key" Kiran Mahattanakit	GMM 25	Main role	
TBA	Be Mine: Be My Sugar †	Pipim	TBA	Main role	

=== Theater ===
Year	Date	Title	Role	Venue	Notes	Ref.
2026	11–25 December	The Love of Siam: The Musical	Ying	Muangthai Rachadalai Theatre	Supporting role	

=== Music video appearances ===
Year	Title	Artist	Ref.
2024	"เทคะแนน (Candidate)"	Fourth	
2026	"จำใจ (Gone Away)"	Gawin	
2026	"เพลงรักที่ยังไม่ลืม (Glitch)"; Moonshadow OST	Emi	

== Discography ==
=== Singles ===
==== Digital singles ====
Year	Title	Artist	Label	Ref.
2026	"ยิ่งชิดยิ่งคิด (Fall For You)"	EmiBonnie	Riser Music	
2026	"Red Kiss"	EmiBonnie	Riser Music	
2026	"กุญแจพระจันทร์ (Moonkey)"	EmiBonnie	Riser Music	
2026	"ชั่วคราวหรือค้างคืนตลอดไป"	EmiBonnie	Riser Music	

==== Collaborations ====
Year	Title	Notes	Ref.
2025	"ฤดูของเรา (Blooming Blossom)"; With Emi, Milk, Love, Namtan, Film, View, Mim, June, Mewnich	Blush Blossom Fan Fest	

==== Soundtrack appearances ====
Year	Title	Notes	Label	Ref.
2025	"Between Us"	Us OST	GMMTV Records	
2025	"ไม่อยากจูบเธอในฝัน (Kissin' Out of Dream)"; With Emi Thasorn	Us OST	GMMTV Records	
2026	"ภาษารัก (Love Language)"	Cat for Cash OST	GMMTV Records	
2026	"Red Kiss"; With Emi Thasorn	Moonshadow OST	Riser Music	
2026	"จะรักให้จำ (Your One)"	Moonshadow OST	Riser Music	
2026	"กุญแจพระจันทร์ (Moonkey)"; With Emi Thasorn	Moonshadow OST	Riser Music	
2026	"ชั่วคราวหรือค้างคืนตลอดไป" with Emi Thasorn	Moonshadow OST	Riser Music	

== Fan meetings ==
Title	Date	Venue	Notes	Ref.
High School Frenemy Final Ep. Fan Meeting	3 December 2024	Siam Pavalai Royal Grand Theater, Siam Paragon	With High School Frenemy cast	
Us Final Ep. Fan Meeting	5 April 2025	Siam Pavalai Royal Grand Theater, Siam Paragon	With Us cast	
EmiBonnie 1st Fan Meeting in Taipei	17 May 2025	NCCU Art & Culture Center Auditorium, Taipei	With Emi	
GMMTV Fanday 22 in Osaka	19 July 2025	Cool Japan Park Osaka WW Hall, Osaka	With Emi	
Emi & Bonnie 1st Fan Meet in Singapore	9 August 2025	GVmax Vivocity, Singapore	With Emi	
EmiBonnie 1st Fanmeeting in Hong Kong	27 September 2025	AXA Dreamland, Go Park, Hong Kong	With Emi	
GMMTV Fanday 26 in Vietnam	22 November 2025	Ben Thanh Theatre, Ho Chi Minh City	With Emi	
EmiBonnie Fan Meeting in Taipei	11 January 2026	Zepp New Taipei, Taipei	With Emi	
Me and Thee Fan Party	17 January 2026	Union Hall, Union Mall	With Me and Thee cast	
Me and Thee After Party	18 January 2026	Union Hall, Union Mall	With Me and Thee cast	
EmiBonnie 1st Fan Meeting in Manila	21 February 2026	SM North EDSA Skydome, Manila	With Emi	
EmiBonnie 1st Fan Meeting in Seoul	11 April 2026	Kwangwoon University Donghae Culture & Arts Center, Seoul	With Emi	
Bonnie & Any Guangzhou Fan Meeting	18 April 2026	Guangzhou, China	With ANY	
Emi & Bonnie JIB Dream Fanmeet 6.5	23 May 2026	Hilton Rome Airport Hotel, Rome	With Emi	
Moonshadow: Under The First Moon	12 August 2026	CentralWorld Pulse Hall, CentralWorld	With Moonshadow cast	
Moonshadow: The Afterglow Fan Party	14 October 2026	Iconsiam Hall, Iconsiam	With Moonshadow cast	
Moonshadow: The Afterglow After Party	15 October 2026	Iconsiam Hall, Iconsiam	With Moonshadow cast	
GMMTV Fan Day 41 in Tokyo	14 February 2027	New Pier Hall, Tokyo	With Emi	

== Concerts ==
Title	Date	Venue	Notes	Ref.
Blush Blossom Fan Fest	28–29 June 2025	Union Hall, Union Mall	With Milk, Love, Namtan, Film, Emi, View, Mim, June, Mewnich	
Blush Blossom Fan Fest in Macau	30 November 2025	Fisherman's Wharf Convention & Exhibition Center, Macau	With Milk, Love, Namtan, Film, Emi, View, Mim, June, Mewnich	
EmiBonnie: Love Session	7–8 March 2026	MCC Hall, The Mall Lifestore Bangkapi, Bangkok	With Emi	
Blush Blossom Fan Fest 2026: Midnight Bloom	13–14 June 2026	BITEC LIVE, Bangkok	With Milk, Love, Namtan, Film, Emi, View, Mim, Jan, JingJing, June, Mewnich, Pahn, Fond, Kapook, Ciize	
JuniorMark Sunny Moon Concert	8 August 2026	BITEC LIVE, Bangkok	With Junior, Mark, Emi, Pahn, Fond	
PondPhuwin Space Soul-dyssey Concert	21–23 August 2026	Impact Arena, Muang Thong Thani	With Pond, Phuwin, Emi, Est, Perth, Santa	
Gemini Art-Venture Concert	4 September 2026	BITEC LIVE, Bangkok	With Gemini, Third, Fourth	
Blush Blossom Fan Fest 2026: Midnight Bloom in Macau	24 October 2026	Fisherman's Wharf Convention & Exhibition Center	With Milk, Love, Namtan, Film, Emi, View, Mim, Jan, JingJing, Pahn, Fond, Kapook, Ciize	
Blush Blossom Fan Fest 2026: Midnight Bloom in Kaohsiung	7 November 2026	Kaohsiung Music Center	With Milk, Love, Namtan, Film, Emi, View, Mim, Jan, JingJing, Pahn, Fond, Kapook, Ciize	
EmiBonnie: Love Session in Singapore	9–10 January 2027	Capitol Theatre	With Emi, ANY	
PEBACA Legacy Fam Concert	30–31 January 2027	BITEC LIVE	With Krist, Singto, Off, Gun, Tay, New, Nanon, Namtan, Gawin, Nani, JingJing, Prem, Sky, Phuwin	
EmiBonnie Concert	24–25 April 2027	Paragon Hall	With Emi	

== Awards and nominations ==
Award nominations for Pattraphus Borattasuwan
Year	Award	Category	Nominee(s)	Result	Ref.
2025	Mint Awards 2025	Rookie of the Year	High School Frenemy	Won	
2025	Howe Awards 2025	The Best Couple Award	with Thasorn Klinnium	Nominated	
2025	Howe Awards 2025	Rising Icon Award	Us	Won	
2025	2025 Thailand Headlines Person of the Year	Culture and Entertainment Award		Won	
2026	Maya Superstar Idol Awards 2026	Rookie Female of the Year		Nominated	
2026	Kazz Awards 2026	Youth Choice of the Year (2nd place)		Won	
2026	Feed x Khaosod Awards 2026	Best Chemistry of the Year	with Thasorn Klinnium	Nominated	
