= Streesmutprakan School =

- Thai: โรงเรียนสตรีสมุทรปราการ

Location
- 489 Moo 1, Sukhumvit Road; Pak Nam Sub-district, Mueang Samut Prakan District, Samut Prakan; 10270; Thailand
- Coordinates: 13°35′51″N 100°36′18″E

Information
- Type: Public school
- Established: 1902; 124 years ago
- Grades: Mathayom 1–6
- Enrollment: 2,870
- Colors: Green and white
- Website: www.streesp.ac.th

Streesmutprakan School (Thai: โรงเรียนสตรีสมุทรปราการ; RTGS: Rongrian Satri Samut Prakan) is a coeducational public high school in Samut Prakan Province, Thailand.

The school has junior high school and high school levels. In 2011 the school received an award from King Bhumibol Adulyadej and was honoured by the Department of Education as an International Standard Quality School.

== History ==
On July 18, 1883. Prince Damrong Rajanubhab established the school as a primary school at Wat Klang, Paknam Muang, in Samut Prakarn In 1900, Chao Phraya Sadej Suren Tara Tippadee made it a high school.

In 1902, a separate school building was built, becoming the first public school in Smutprakan Province Praya Racha Yusatok established another school building for girls in the temple.

In 1938, Streesmutprakan school moved to a new site, incorporating the girls school from the temple. The school was opposite Pichai Songkram Temple and had an area of about three hectares. The school taught primary school level 3 to junior high school level 3 by Krasair RatanaWraha, who established the first two buildings of the school named RuenSangruji and Phinittantakit.

In 1942, Sobsamai Burawas became the principal . On 8 August 1956, the school was moved to the present site. The land was donated by Loung Prajerd Ugsornluk, who gave 8,000 square metres (86,000 sq ft), and the school bought an additional 8,988 square metres (96,750 sq ft) with money from the Department of Education. Later on, the school received 760 square metres (8,200 sq ft) from Srisomboon Sittichai. The school now has a total area of 17,748 square metres (191,040 sq ft).
