= 23.5 =

2024 Thai television series

- Official series poster
- 23.5 องศาที่โลกเอียง
- Genre: Girls' love; Romantic comedy
- Based on: 23.5 When the Earth Is Spinning Around by Blue (น้ำเงิน)
- Written by: Nichaphat Buranadilok; Naphat Chitveerapat; Lalil Kittitanaphan
- Directed by: Kanittha Kwanyu
- Starring: Pansa Vosbein; Pattranite Limpatiyakorn
- Country of origin: Thailand
- Original language: Thai
- No. of seasons: 1
- No. of episodes: 12

Production
- Cinematography: Weeranuch Laometakorn; Tanai Nimchareonpong
- Running time: 45 minutes
- Production company: GMMTV

Original release
- Network: GMM 25; YouTube; Netflix
- Release: 8 March – 24 May 2024

23.5 (Thai: 23.5 องศาที่โลกเอียง RTGS: Yisip Sam Chut Ha Ongsa Thi Lok Iang; lit. 'The Earth's Axis Tilts by 23.5 Degrees') is a Thai girls' love romantic comedy television series starring Pansa Vosbein (Milk) and Pattranite Limpatiyakorn (Love). Adapted from the novel of the same name, the series follows the story of Ongsa, a shy transfer student who befriends Sun, one of the most popular girls at her new school, on social media using the pseudonym “Earth.” Directed by Kanittha Kwanyu and produced by GMMTV, it premiered on GMM 25, GMMTV YouTube channel and Netflix on 8 March 2024, and ran until 24 May 2024. It was one of GMMTV's first major girls' love series.

== Synopsis ==
Ongsa starts her new high school life as an awkward transfer student, but things quickly change when Ongsa uses the Instagram name Earth to talk to her classmate Sun, who happens to be one of the most popular girls at school. However Ongsa's username lead Sun to believe she is actually talking to a guy. Not wanting to give up the opportunity to keep talking to Sun, Ongsa keeps her identity a secret and continues talking as Earth.

== Cast and characters ==
=== Main ===
- Pansa Vosbein (Milk) as Nunnapat Ampornsopon (Ongsa) / Earth
- Pattranite Limpatiyakorn (Love) as Prawtawan Ampanlert (Sun)

=== Supporting ===
- Benyapa Jeenprasom (View) as Aylin Kuea-ari
- Wanwimol Jaenasavamethee (June) as Luna
- Rutricha Phapakithi (Ciize) as Napatsanun Ampornsopon (Alpha)
- Preeyaphat Lawsuwansiri (Earn) as Charoen
- Allan Asawasuebsakul (Ford) as Tinh
- Chayapol Jutamas (AJ) as Ton
- Thanaset Suriyapornchaikul (Euro) as Mawin
- Tachakorn Boonlupyanun (Godji) as Nida
- Kittipat Chalaragse (Golf) as Bambam

== Production ==
A teaser trailer was released on 22 November 2022. Norawit Titicharoenrak (Gemini) and Nattawat Jirochtikul (Fourth) were initially cast in the project, however GMMTV announced on 19 July 2023, that both actors would no longer take part in 23.5 in order to prepare for their roles in a new series together. Filming for 23.5 finished in November 2023, and the official trailer was released on 23 February 2024.

== Reception ==
Frank Hecker, a staff writer at Okazu, gave the series an overall 8 out of 10, praising it and noting that "those familiar with mistaken identity romances know how this will end, but the journey on the way is quite enjoyable, thanks in large part to the central couple. As portrayed by Love, Sun is one of the most adorable and charming love interests ever to grace this solar system, while Milk’s Ongsa is completely endearing as she veers from giddy infatuation to agonized embarrassment."
