= Ronnadet Wongsaroj =

Thai singer (born 1980)

- รณเดช วงศาโรจน์
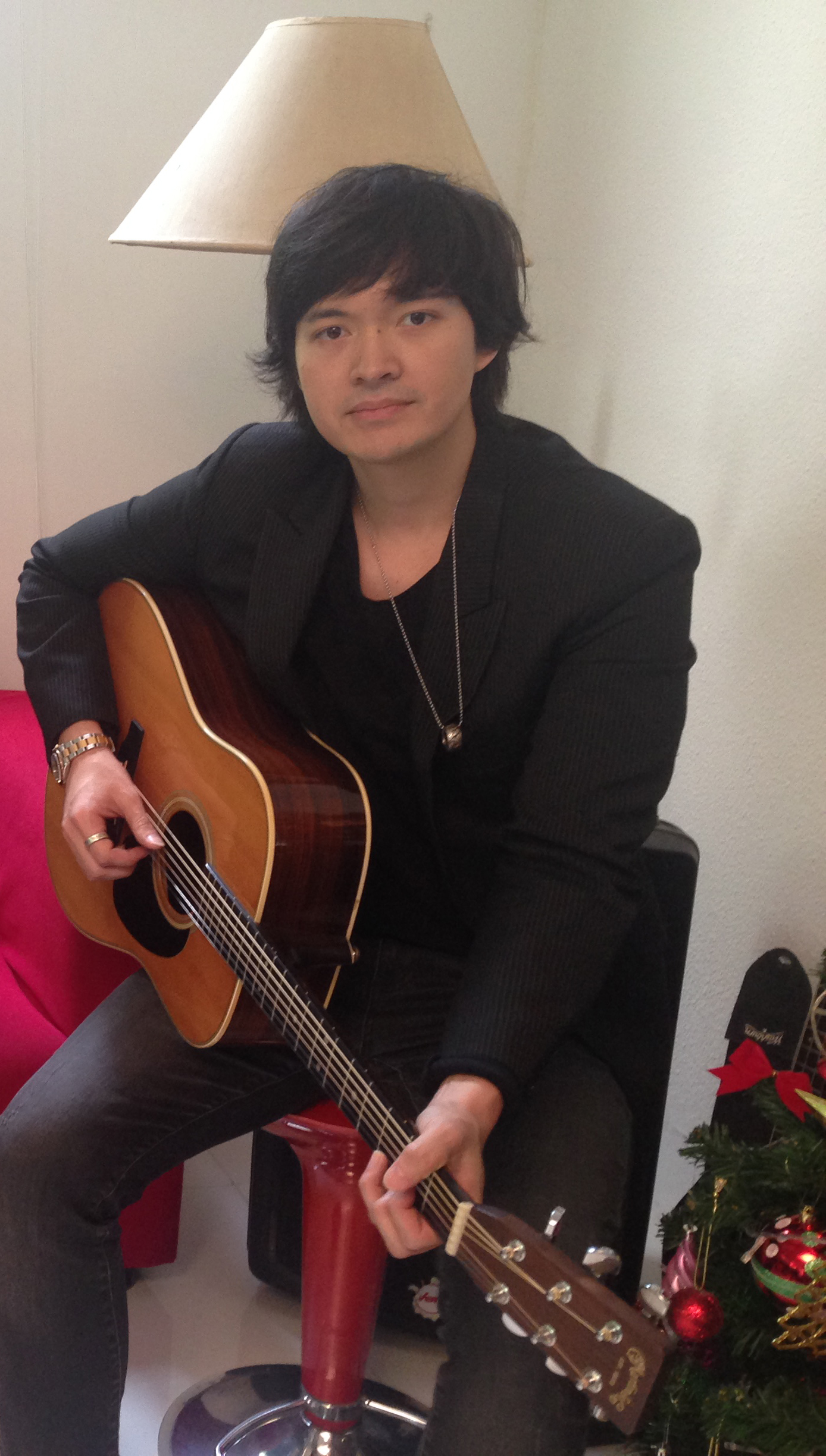
- Born: Ronnadet Wongsaroj; 22 April 1980 (age 46); Bangkok, Thailand
- Other name: Namm Ronnadet
- Height: 1.77 m (5 ft 9 1/2 in)

Ronnadet Wongsaroj (Thai: รณเดช วงศาโรจน์; born 22 April 1980) is a Thai singer. He graduated at Bangkok Christian College, Mahidol University International College (Salaya) and Chulalongkorn University.

== Personal life ==
Ronnadet is first son of Jirasak Wongsaroj and Dararat Wongsaroj. He has 1 sister named Ureson Wongsaroj. He is now in a relationship with Onjira Lamvilai.

== Work ==
=== Sitcom ===
- 2013 - Series Club Friday
- 2014 - Heng Heng Heng
