= Natticha Chantaravareelekha =

Thai singer and actress (born 2002)

- ณัฐทิชา จันทรวารีเลขา
- Natticha in 2025
- Born: 3 December 2002 (age 23); Bangkok, Thailand
- Other name: Fond (ฟ้อนด์)
- Education: Bangkok University
- Occupations: Singer; actress
- Years active: 2018–present
- Agent: GMMTV (2025–present)
- Known for: Mew in The Cheese Sisters
- Height: 1.57 m (5 ft 2 in)
- Musical career
- Genres: T-pop; J-pop
- Instrument: Vocals
- Labels: BNK48 Office; independent Artist Management (iAM)
- Formerly of: BNK48

Natticha Chantaravareelekha (Thai: ณัฐทิชา จันทรวารีเลขา; born 3 December 2002), nicknamed Fond (Thai: ฟ้อนด์), is a Thai singer and actress. She is a former member of the Thai idol girl group BNK48, an international sister group of the Japanese idol girl group AKB48, under team NV. She was one of the second-generation members of the group.

== Early life and education ==
Natticha was born in Bangkok, Thailand, but was raised in Prachuap Khiri Khan province from a young age. She went on to study at Bangkok University's School of Entrepreneurship and Management, graduating from the Bachelor of Business Administration Program in Entrepreneurship in December 2025.

== Career ==
She began her acting career as a child. Natticha was one of three remaining founding members of QRRA (pronounced like "Car-ra") before they disbanded in 2025. QRRA was BNK48's second sub-unit. The group formerly performed under the name LYRA, consisting of five other members who were also chosen to be trained by Universal Music Thailand and debuted on October 7, 2020. The group was later renamed VYRA on March 12, 2021, and on September 27, 2022, the group was renamed QRRA.

She joined GMMTV in 2025. Her first project under GMMTV is alongside acting partner Pathitta Pornchumroenrut (Pahn) with their upcoming series Wish upon a Star.

== Discography ==
=== BNK48 ===
Year	Title	Album	Group name	Ref.
2020	"LYRA"	LYRA: The 1st EP	LYRA	
2020	"Vanilla"	LYRA: The 1st EP	LYRA	
2020	"เมโลดี้..ที่คิดถึง (Our Memory)"	—N/a	LYRA	
2021	"ต๊ะต่อนยอน...Hurry Up!" (feat. Sunnee)	—N/a	VYRA	
2023	"Miracle"	—N/a	QRRA	
2024	"Happy We Day"	—N/a	QRRA	
2024	"Enough"	—N/a	QRRA	
2024	"After Flirt"	—N/a	QRRA	
2025	"CAKE ROULETTE"	—N/a	QRRA	
2025	"Midnight Text"	—N/a	QRRA	

=== Soundtrack appearances ===
Year	Title	Soundtrack	Label	Ref.
2022	"Bye Bye"; With Wee Weeraya	The Cheese Sisters OST	Independent Records	
2026	"หลง (Lost in Dreams)"	Oxytoxin OST	GMMTV Records	

== Filmography ==
=== Film ===
Year	Title	Role	Notes	Ref.
2018	BNK48: Girls Don't Cry	Herself	Documentary film	
2020	BNK48: One Take	Herself	Documentary film	
2022	The Cheese Sisters	Mew	Main role	
2023	The Ghoul Mansion	Kib	Main role	
2023	Not Friends	Liu	Main role	

=== Television series ===
Key
†	Denotes television productions that have not yet been released

Year	Title	Role	Notes	Network	Ref.
2018	Love Destiny	Kaew	Guest role	Channel 3	
2018	Love Destiny: Uncut	Kaew	Guest role	Channel 3	
2018	Kiss Me Again	Gift	Guest role	GMM 25	
2018	Social Death Vote	Fiw	Supporting role	Channel 3	
2019	One Year	"Baby" Phrima Chotiwiriyakul	Supporting role	One 31	
2020	The Underclass	Meow	Supporting role	GMM 25	
2023	Escape to Homestay	Bell	Main role	iQIYI	
2025	Dating Game	Jeans	Supporting role	Netflix	
TBA	Wish upon a Star †	"Satellite" Dao	Main role	TBA	
TBA	Kiss Me, Stranger †	Sirin	Main role	TBA	

=== Appearances in music videos ===
Year	Title	Artist(s)	Ref.
2024	"เหตุผลข้อเดียว (I Mean)"	NEVONE	
2024	"ฝันสุดท้าย"	Famoso	
2024	"อยู่ได้แล้ว (Yoodailaew)"	Lipta (feat. Mirrr)	
2024	"ความสวยงาม"	The Publish	
2025	"ใจเย็น (Head Over Heels)"	Sarah Salola	
2025	"เทหมดหน้าตัก (All In)"	Phuwin Tangsakyuen	
2026	"ยิ่งห้ามยิ่งยุ (YHYU)"	Mirrr	

== Fanmeetings ==
Title	Date	Venue	Notes	Ref.
The Crowning Step: QRRA Fanmeet	December 14, 2025	Union Hall, Union Mall	With Chanya, Niky, Paeyah, Popper	
GMMTV International Novel Festival 2026	July 26, 2026	Samyan Mitrtown, 5th Fl.	With Pahn	

== Concerts ==
Title	Date	Venue	Notes	Ref.
BNK48 Concert: 1st 2gether	September 15, 2018	CentralWorld	With BNK48's 1st and 2nd generation	
BNK48 Space Mission Concert	January 26, 2019	Impact Arena	With BNK48	
BNK48 2nd Generation: Blooming Season Concert	November 2, 2019	BITEC LIVE	With BNK48's 2nd generation	
Blush Blossom Fan Fest: Midnight Bloom	June 13–14, 2026	BITEC LIVE	With Pahn, Milk, Love, Namtan, Film, Emi, Bonnie, View, Mim, Jan, JingJing, June, Mewnich, Kapook, Ciize	
JuniorMark Sunny Moon Concert	August 8, 2026	BITEC LIVE	With Junior, Mark, Pahn, Emi, Bonnie	
Gemini Art-Venture Concert	September 5, 2026	BITEC LIVE	With Gemini, Tytan, Fourth, Billkin	
Blush Blossom Fan Fest: Midnight Bloom in Macau	October 24, 2026	Fisherman’s Wharf Convention & Exhibition Center	With Pahn, Milk, Love, Namtan, Film, Emi, Bonnie, View, Mim, Jan, JingJing, Kapook, Ciize	
Blush Blossom Fan Fest: Midnight Bloom in Kaohsiung	November 7, 2026	Kaohsiung Music Center	With Pahn, Milk, Love, Namtan, Film, Emi, Bonnie, View, Mim, Jan, JingJing, Kapook, Ciize	

== Awards and nominations ==
Year	Event	Category	Result	Ref.
2021	Maya Awards	People's Choice Artist Award; With VYRA	Won	
