= Tanan Lohawatanakul =

Thai actor (born 2007)

- ธนัน โลหะวัฒนกุล
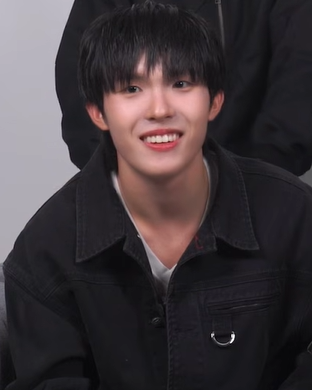
- Paul in May 2026
- Born: Tanan Lohawatanakul; 9 March 2007 (age 19); Bangkok, Thailand
- Other name: Paul (พอล)
- Education: Open School (Creative Media Program)
- Occupation: Actor
- Years active: 2024–present
- Agent: GMMTV
- Known for: Tar in Boys in Love; Achi in When Oranges Fall
- Height: 1.70 m (5 ft 7 in)

Tanan Lohawatanakul (Thai: ธนัน โลหะวัฒนกุล; born 9 March 2007), nicknamed Paul (Thai: พอล), is a Thai actor under GMMTV. He made his television debut in 2024 with the series Summer Night and became better known for his roles in the series The Heart Killers (2024), Boys in Love (2025), Head 2 Head (2025) and When Oranges Fall (2026), broadcast on GMM 25.

== Biography and career ==
Tanan Lohawatanakul was born on 9 March 2007 in Bangkok, Thailand. During high school, he studied in the Creative Media Program at Open School. In 2023, Paul was represented by Mchoice. In December 2023, he participated in the agency's Mchoice Fans Day 2023 event. In 2024, he signed with GMMTV and made his acting debut in the series Summer Night, portraying Ice in a guest role. Later that same year, he joined the cast of The Heart Killers as Knot, his first recurring television role.

In 2025, he was among the actors starring in the GMMTV series Boys in Love, portraying Tar Tinnaphop Limwatthanakul opposite Kanthee Limpitikranon (Ken). In the same year, he appeared in the series Revamp The Undead Story, portraying the younger version of Jett, Head 2 Head as Beam, and made a guest appearance in MuTeLuv.

In 2026, he was cast as Achi Achira Loetwarit in the series When Oranges Fall, as part of the main cast. In 2026, he was also cast in the series Kiss Me, Remember?.

== Filmography ==
=== Television series ===
Year	Title	Role	Network	Category	Ref.
2024	Summer Night	Ice	GMM 25	Guest role	
2024	The Heart Killers	Knot	GMM 25	Supporting role	
2025	Boys in Love	"Tar" Tinnaphop Limwatthanakul	GMM 25	Main role	
2025	Revamp The Undead Story	Jett (young)	GMM 25	Guest role	
2025	Head 2 Head	Beam	GMM 25	Guest role	
2025	Muteluv: Not My Father!	Celebrity	GMM 25	Guest role	
2026	When Oranges Fall	"Achi" Achira Loetwarit	GMM 25	Main role	
TBA	Kiss Me, Remember?	Tengnueng	TBA	Supporting role	

=== Television show ===
Year	Title	Network	Notes
2025	GMMTV Live House	YouTube	with Ken, Paul, Sing and Jan (15 May 2025)
2025	Arm Share	YouTube, LINE TV	Episode 181 (25 June 2025)
2025	GMMTV Live House	YouTube	with Luke, Mick, Chokun, Aston, Ken, Paul and Tay (3 July 2025)
2026	GMMTV Live House	YouTube	with Ken, Paul and Junior (26 May 2026)
2026	GMMTV Live House	YouTube	with Junior, Mark, Paul and Jummo (9 July 2026)
2026	GMMTV Live House	YouTube	with Almond, Progress, Ken, Paul and Neo (21 July 2026)

=== Music videos ===
Year	Title	Artist	Album	Appearance	Ref.
2026	"Season of You" (ฤดูกาลที่มีเธอ)	Satang Kittiphop	When Oranges Fall OST	Appears in the music video	

== Fan meetings ==
Year	Date	Event	Venue
2025	13 February	The Heart Killers: Never Back Down Final Ep. Fan Party	MCC Hall
2025	6 July	Boys in Love Final Eo. Fan Meeting	Siam Pavalai Royal Grand Theatre
2025	23 November	GMMTV Fanday 26 in Vietnam	Ben Thanh Theater
2026	13 May	When Oranges Fall: First Fall, First Love	Siam Pavalai Royal Grand Theatre
2026	29 July	When Oranges Fall Final Ep. Fan Meeting	CentralWorld Pulse Hall

== Events ==
Year	Date	Event	Venue	Ref.
2023	3 December	Mchoice Fans Day 2023	Central Chaengwattana Hall	
2024	21 December	GMMTV Starlympic	Impact Arena	
2025	20 December	GMMTV Starlympic	Impact Arena	
2026	28 November	GMMTV Starlympic	Impact Arena	
2026	2 August	National Book Fair 2026 – Ken–Paul–Keaton Fan Sign	Queen Sirikit National Convention Center	
