= Not Friends (film) =

- Theatrical release poster
- Directed by: Atta Hemwadee
- Written by: Atta Hemwadee
- Produced by: Vanridee Pongsittisak; Baz Poonpiriya
- Starring: Thitiya Jirapornsilp; Pisitphon Ekphongpisit; Anthony Buisseret; Tanakorn Tiyanont; Natticha Chantaravareelekha
- Cinematography: Pasit Tandaechanurat
- Edited by: Chonlasit Upanigkit
- Music by: Vichaya Vatanasapt
- Production company: Houseton Films
- Distributed by: GDH 559
- Release date: October 26, 2023 (Thailand)
- Running time: 130 minutes
- Country: Thailand
- Language: Thai

Not Friends (Thai: เพื่อน(ไม่)สนิท, RTGS: Phuean (Mai) Sanit, lit. '(Not) close friends') is a 2023 Thai coming-of-age comedy-drama film written and directed by Atta Hemwadee in his directorial debut. It stars Thitiya Jirapornsilp, Pisitphon Ekphongpisit, Anthony Buisseret, Tanakorn Tiyanont and Natticha Chantaravareelekha. It was released on October 26, 2023, in Thai theaters.

It was selected as the Thai entry for the Best International Feature Film at the 96th Academy Awards but was not nominated.

== Synopsis ==
Pae is a bitter student who recently transferred to a new school in the middle of his sixth semester. There he meets Joe, the class favorite, who wanted to have him as a friend, but Pae denied him. The next day, a car crash kills Joe, leaving the entire school in mourning. Seeing this as a perfect opportunity to win on his college application, Pae, despite having no real connection to the school favorite, proposes to the entire institution that he make a short film to commemorate Joe's death.

== Cast ==
The actors participating in this film are:

- Anthony Buisseret as Pae
- Pisitpol Ekaphongpisit as Joe
- Thitiya Jirapornsilp as Bokeh
- Tanakorn Tiyanont as Ping
- Ingkarat Damrongsakkul as Ohm
- Natticha Chantaravareelekha as Liu
- Jirapat Siwakosit as Boom
- Panachanok Wattanavrangkul as Pop
- Pathaseth Kooncharoen as Art
- Poon Mitpakdee as Thanon
- Tipagorn Chaiprasit as Class teacher
- Kittiphong Dumavibhat as Principal Cherdchai
- Duangjai Hiransri as Joe's mother
- Naruemon Pongsupap as Ohm's mother
- Pramote Sangsorn as Pae's father
- Sira Simmee as Atom
- Komsan Wattanavanitchakorn as Atom' professor
- Pimfun Chaisongcroh as Jane
- Parama Malakul Na Ayudhya as Jane's husband
- Goppong Khunthreeya as Meiji's girlfriend's father
- Fuki Tamura as Meiji
- Benyapa Noosaeng as Meiji's girlfriend
- Naratip Chainarong as PE teacher
- Warapass Rangsiyawath as Bokeh's mother
- Uthit Boonsoemkhanit as Bokeh's father

== Release ==
The film was screened at the 28th Fantasia International Film Festival on July 21, 2024.

== See also ==
- List of Thai submissions for the Academy Award for Best International Feature Film
- List of submissions to the 96th Academy Awards for Best International Feature Film
