= Enigma Black Stage =

2025 Thai television series

- Official series poster
- Also known as: Enigma 2
- บุหงาหมื่นภมร
- Genre: Supernatural thriller
- Created by: Patha Thongpan; Puchong Tuntisungwaragul
- Screenplay by: Patha Thongpan; Jarinee Thanomyat
- Directed by: Patha Thongpan
- Starring: Metawin Opas-iamkajorn; Jarinporn Joonkiat
- Country of origin: Thailand
- Original language: Thai
- No. of seasons: 1
- No. of episodes: 5

Production
- Executive producers: Darapa Chaysanguan; Sataporn Panichraksapong
- Producer: Nuttapong Mongkolsawas
- Production location: Thailand
- Cinematography: Supawat Morakotamporn
- Editor: BUZZCUT
- Camera setup: Multi-camera
- Running time: 53 minutes
- Production companies: The One Enterprise; GMMTV; Parbdee Tawesuk

Original release
- Network: One 31; Netflix
- Release: 26 July – 23 August 2025

Related
- Enigma (2023)

Enigma Black Stage (Thai: บุหงาหมื่นภมร, RTGS: Bu-nga Muen Phamon) is a Thai supernatural thriller television series and the sequel to Enigma (2023). The series stars Metawin Opas-iamkajorn (Win) reprising his role as Ajin, alongside Jarinporn Joonkiat (Toey) in a leading role. Directed by the original creator Patha Thongpan, and produced by GMMTV and Parbdee Tawesuk, the series premiered on Channel One 31 and Netflix on 26 July 2025, and airs every Saturday at 20:30 ICT.

== Synopsis ==
Ajin (Metawin Opas-iamkajorn) discovers a casting competition for the stage play Buhnga Muen Phamon (The Bloom and a Thousand Bees), hosted by M.L. Ray (Niti Chaichitathorn), a well-known socialite and heir to the original novel, the stage play will be based on. He reaches out to Plengpin (Jarinporn Joonkiat), a struggling model he believes has untapped talent. He encourages her to audition, putting her in direct competition with three standout contenders: Jew (Prariyapit Yu), an acclaimed dancer; Myday (Thishar Thurachon), a popular influencer; and Anya (Tipnaree Weerawatnodom), a rising actress. As the competition intensifies, hidden motives and unsettling truths begin to surface behind the show’s polished exterior.

== Cast and characters ==
=== Main ===
- Metawin Opas-iamkajorn (Win) as Ajin Nakaritta

A mysterious man with powerful sorcery who senses something sinister behind the Buhnga Muen Phamon stage play contest. He recruits Plengpin, a down-on-her-luck promo girl, to enter the competition and to get him access to the cursed dress.

- Jarinporn Joonkiat (Toey) as Plengpin Piengamorn

A struggling model whose career has hit rock bottom. Desperate for a break, she agrees to enter the Buhnga Muen Phamon stage play contest after being approached by Ajin.

=== Supporting ===
- Tipnaree Weerawatnodom (Namtan) as Anya Tiwa-asan

Ajin’s ex-girlfriend, who is a talented and popular model and actress, is seen as one of the top threats in the competition.

- Prariyapit Yu (JingJing) as Jew

A skilled dancer and multiple time competition winner.

- Thishar Thurachon (Mint) as Myday

A famous influencer with a massive nationwide following.

- Niti Chaichitathorn (Pompam) as M.L. Ray (Note: M.L. stands for Mom Luang, the lowest rank of Thai nobility. It is an honorific title used for descendants of Thai royalty, often translated as "The Honorable".)

A high-society figure who organizes a competition to find a leading lady for a stage play based on the novel Buhnga Muen Phamon, written by his late grandfather.

=== Guest ===
- Sikha Thitaradis as Kosum
- Ratcha-arpa-ake Tunsiriwanlobp as Aekasit
- Nophand Boonyai as Anant
- Pannawit Karnjanaveerawit as Ajin (young)
- Bulasak Prasitvatanakul as Rath

== Soundtrack ==
No.	Title	Music	Artist	Length
1.	"Ten Billion Years"	Femme TOV	Torii Wolf	04:26
2.	"Heartbeat Faster"	Karapet R. Moralyan	Mia Mormino	03:11
3.	"Frolicking Mayhem"	Mauro Colangelo	Robert Etoll	02:16
4.	"The Web"	Karapet R. Moralyan	Mia Mormino	00:50
5.	"Malevolent Compulsion"	Benjamin Hayden · James Murray	Benjamin Hayden	02:00

== Episodes ==
No.	Title	Directed by	Written by	Original release date
1	"Episode 1"	Patha Thongpan	Patha Thongpan & Jarinee Tanomyat	26 July 2025
Plengpin is approached by Ajin, a mysterious man who offers to mentor her for an audition. A competition led by M.L. Ray, aims to adapt her late grandfather’s unpublished novel into a stage play 66 years after it was written. At the audition, Plengpin meets Anya, an actress and Ajin’s ex, whom Ajin warns her to avoid. Though Plengpin's semifinal audition seems successful, she later receives a rejection letter but then called back to record another tape, only to be drugged and wake up in a forest, facing a series of unsettling events that later revealed to be part of an unconventional final test. Phlengphin passes, joining Anya, Jew, and Myday as finalists. That night, Anya warns her to quit, and Ajin is revealed to have entered the process under false pretenses.
2	"Episode 2"	Patha Thongpan	Patha Thongpan & Jarinee Tanomyat	2 August 2025
The audition continues in a secluded mansion where Ajin is secretly disguised as an assistant producer. The girls are paired into teams, but tension quickly escalates when shards of glass are found in Myday’s shoes. Jew uses shapeshifting magic to frame Anya. But it’s later revealed that Myday faked the injury with help from her enchanted crew while spreading damaging rumors online about Anya and Ajin. Furious and misled, Anya nearly attacks Ajin, but their emotional confrontation ends with her choosing to help him. Just as things begin to settle, she is suddenly and mysteriously attacked.
3	"Episode 3"	Patha Thongpan	Patha Thongpan & Jarinee Tanomyat	9 August 2025
After Anya’s death, M.L. Ray insists the competition continue, and everyone is forced to go along with it. Aekasit, unsettled by the sheer insanity, asks Ajin if they should escape. Only turns out he and the rest of the crew are actually part of the Enigma, working with Ajin’s ruthless aunt Kosum, who is after the Bunga Muen Phamon dress. She orders him to get Plengpin to quit the competition. Fearing Plengpin could share Anya’s fate, Ajin urges her to leave the mansion, but Plengpin calls her bluff and convinces Ajin to stay in the game.
4	"Episode 4"	Patha Thongpan	Patha Thongpan & Jarinee Tanomyat	16 August 2025
The competition narrows down to the finals between Jew and Plengpin, but the event takes a dark turn when Mayday in a fit of rage attacks Jew with a hot iron, leaving half of her face disfigured. Furious at the setback Madam Kosum transfers Jew's injury to Mayday. During the tense finale Madam Kosum attempts to kill Plengpin but Ajin intervenes saving her life, this sparks a brutal showdown between Ajin and Kosum ending with Kosum’s death. Plengpin emerges victorious in the competition and Plengpin and Ajin decided to part ways, but just as Plengpin steps into her new role as the lead she is suddenly ambushed by Jew.
5	"Episode 5"	Patha Thongpan	Patha Thongpan & Jarinee Tanomyat	23 August 2025
On the night of the grand performance, Jew kidnaps Plengpin. Ajin and M.L. Ray rush to stop her as Jew insists the competition is not truly over and that a hidden epilogue remains. In the ensuing struggle, Jew falls from the building to her death. Determined to keep the show alive, M.L. Ray carries on with the performance until Plengpin suddenly turns on Ajin and stabs him. The horrifying truth comes to light: she has been possessed by the author of Buhnga Muen Phamon, the very creator of the cursed dress, whose spirit once controlled Aekasit and claimed her body after his death. With her loyal followers, Plengpin sets the building ablaze, erasing everything in fire. Five years later, the possessed Plengpin has risen to fame as a celebrated star and later transformed herself into a powerful political figure. Just as she reaches the height of her influence, Ajin returns and unveils long-buried footage from that night, threatening to bring her empire crashing down. Meanwhile, Plengpin's spirit, which was chained in the mental dimension, began to signal her signs of resistance and fight back with finger symbols.

== Production ==
The sequel to Enigma was officially announced at the GMMTV 2024 UP & ABOVE PART 1 event, held on 18 October 2023 at Union Hall, Bangkok. The event featured the premiere of the first teaser trailer, which confirmed Metawin Opas-iamkajorn’s return as the lead and introduced Jarinporn Joonkiat as the new female lead. Both actors were present at the event. This marks Jarinporn’s first announced project since ending her exclusive contract with Channel 3, and her first collaboration with GMMTV in seventeen years.

Production began with a script reading session held on 4 September 2024, bringing together the main cast and crew. During this session, Prariyapit Yu and Thishar Thurachon were first introduced as new additions to the cast. A workshop followed on 26 September 2024, focusing on character development and scene preparation. Principal photography began on 28 October 2024, with Tipnaree Weerawatnodom confirmed to be reprising her role as Anya after a behind-the-scenes photo of her on set was posted by the official X account, which led to public recognition of her return. Filming continued for approximately two months and concluded on 22 December 2024.

== Release ==
The official trailer for Enigma Black Stage was released on 12 July 2025 on GMMTV’s official social media platforms, including YouTube, Instagram, TikTok, and X (formerly Twitter).

The series premiered on 26 July 2025 on the Thai television network One 31, airing weekly every Saturday at 8:30 PM ICT. Episodes are also available for streaming worldwide on Netflix shortly after the original broadcast.

A special press screening and launch event was held on 26 July 2025 at SF World Cinema, CentralWorld in Bangkok, with the main cast and the director in attendance.

== Reception ==
The official trailer for Enigma: Black Stage garnered over 2.74 million views across all platforms, within the first 24 hours. The release also generated significant buzz on social media, trending in multiple regions on X (formerly Twitter).

Ticket sales for the special screening event Enigma Black Stage First Screening had sold out within minutes of being made available.

Following the release of its first episode, Enigma Black Stage was listed as the 8th most popular new addition to Netflix in the United States for that week.

== Awards and nominations ==
Award nominations for Enigma Black Stage
Year	Award	Category	Nominee(s)	Result	Ref.
2025	Thailand Box Office Awards 2025	Series of the Year (Drama)	Enigma Black Stage	Won	
2026	ContentAsia Awards 2026	Best Cinematography in a TV Series	Enigma Black Stage	Nominated	
2026	ContentAsia Awards 2026	Best Supporting Actress in a TV Programme / Series Made in Asia	Thishar Thurachon	Nominated	
2026	Asian Academy Creative Awards 2026	Best Actress in a Supporting Role (Thailand)	Tipnaree Weerawatnodom	Won	
2026	Asian Academy Creative Awards 2026	Best Cinematography (Fiction)	Enigma Black Stage	Won	
2026	Asian Academy Creative Awards 2026	Best Screenplay	Enigma Black Stage	Won	
2026	Asian Academy Creative Awards 2026	Best Promo or Trailer	Enigma Black Stage	Won	
2026	31st Asian Television Awards	Best Actress in a Supporting Role	Prariyapit Yu	Nominated	
2026	31st Asian Television Awards	Best Actress in a Supporting Role	Tipnaree Weerawatnodom	Nominated	
2026	31st Asian Television Awards	Best Original Screenplay	Jarinee Thanomyat and Patha Thongpan	Nominated	
2026	31st Asian Television Awards	Best Scriptwriting	Jarinee Thanomyat and Patha Thongpan	Nominated	
2026	31st Asian Television Awards	Best Cinematography (Drama)	Natthaphak Khanachotchaiyapong	Nominated	
2026	31st Asian Television Awards	Best Production Design (Drama)	Teerachard Pongvilai	Nominated	
2026	31st Asian Television Awards	Best Editing (Drama)	Natthaphon Timmuang and Krich Towiwat	Nominated	
2026	31st Asian Television Awards	Best Southeast Asian Drama Series	Enigma Black Stage	Nominated	
2026	31st Asian Television Awards	Best Southeast Asian Drama (Direction)	Patha Thongpan	Won	
2026	31st Asian Television Awards	Best Southeast Asian Drama (Screenplay)	Jarinee Thanomyat and Patha Thongpan	Won	
2026	31st Asian Television Awards	Best Southeast Asian Drama (Cinematography)	Natthaphak Khanachotchaiyapong	Nominated	
