= Krongkwan Nakornthap =

Thai singer and actress (born 2005)

- ครองขวัญ นาครทรรพ
- Born: 17 January 2005 (age 21); Bangkok, Thailand
- Other name: Jaoying (เจ้าหญิง)
- Education: Chulalongkorn University
- Occupations: Singer; actress
- Years active: 2020–present
- Agents: Nadao Bangkok (2020–2022); GMMTV (2022–present)
- Known for: Khaotung in Loneliness Society; Gale in Beauty Newbie; Ploypim in Oxytoxin
- Height: 1.68 m (5 ft 6 in)
- Musical career
- Genre: Thai Pop
- Instrument: Vocals
- Years active: 2024–present
- Label: Riser Music
- Member of: Felizz

Krongkwan Nakornthap (Thai: ครองขวัญ นาครทรรพ; born 17 January 2005), nicknamed Jaoying (Thai: เจ้าหญิง), is a Thai singer and actress. She is the lead vocalist of the T-Pop girl group Felizz under Riser Music. She is known for her roles in Loneliness Society (2023), Beauty Newbie (2024), and MuTeLuv: Not My Father (2025), as well as for competing on the Chinese-Thai reality survival show Chuang Asia: Thailand, where she finished in 19th place out of 70 contestants.

== Early life and education ==
Krongkwan was born on 17 January 2005 in Bangkok, Thailand. She is the second child of Anudith Nakornthap, a Thai politician and retired Royal Thai Air Force officer. She has two brothers and three sisters. After completing her secondary education at Kasetsart University Laboratory School, she enrolled at Chulalongkorn University, where she is currently pursuing a Bachelor of Arts in Speech Communication and Performing Arts at the Faculty of Communication Arts.

== Career ==
=== 2020–2024: Nadao Bangkok, GMMTV and Chuang Asia: Thailand ===
Krongkwan began her career as a trainee under Nadao Bangkok in 2020, making her on-screen debut with a guest appearance in the series I Promised You the Moon. Following the closure of Nadao Bangkok's artist management division in 2022, she signed with GMMTV. She appeared in the psychological thriller film Faces of Anne (2022), was subsequently cast in a supporting role as Khaotung in Loneliness Society (2023), and made a guest appearance as the younger version of Florence in The Jungle (2023).

In late 2023, she entered the Chinese-Thai reality survival show Chuang Asia: Thailand, which aired in 2024, competing alongside future fellow Riser Rookies members Nutnicha Sangmanee (Pream) and Chompoopuntip Temtanamongkol (Acare). She was the final contestant eliminated in the third round, finishing in 19th place out of 70 contestants.

=== 2024–present: Debut with Felizz and Love's Echoes ===
On 26 November 2024, during the "GMMTV 2025: Riding the Wave" event, it was revealed that Riser Music had started training a new girl group named Riser Rookies. During this period, Krongkwan and the other members performed dance covers of tracks by fellow Riser Music artists with original choreography to build their fanbase and showcase their skills. On 16 May 2025, the group's official name was revealed as Felizz and they debuted on 23 May 2025 with the digital single "See Through". Later that year, she played Fay in the "Not My Father" segment of the supernatural romantic comedy anthology series MuTeLuv, made a guest appearance in Sweet Tooth, Good Dentist, and was cast in a supporting role in the upcoming series Wish upon a Star. On 19 July 2026, GMMTV announced that Krongkwan had been cast as a main lead alongside Nannaphas Loetnamchoetsakun (Mewnich) in the girls' love series Love's Echoes, replacing Wanwimol Jaenasavamethee (June).

== Discography ==
=== Singles ===
==== Collaborations ====
Year	Title	Notes
2024	"Summer Dream" (with the contestants of Chuang Asia: Thailand)	Theme song for Chuang Asia: Thailand

== Filmography ==
=== Film ===
Year	Title	Role	Notes
2022	Faces of Anne	Anne	Supporting role

=== Television series ===
Key
†	Denotes television productions that have not yet been released

Year	Title	Role	Notes	Ref.
2021	I Promised You The Moon	Airy	Guest role	
2023	Loneliness Society	Khaotung	Supporting role	
2023	The Jungle	Florence (young)	Guest role	
2024	Beauty Newbie	Gale Sayapisit	Supporting role	
2025	Sweet Tooth, Good Dentist	An	Guest role	
2025	MuTeLuv: Not My Father	Fay	Supporting role	
2026	Oxytoxin	Ploypim Chaiotrakhul	Supporting role	
TBA	Love's Echoes †	Clara	Main role	
TBA	Wish upon a Star †	Anda	Supporting role	

=== Music video appearances ===
Year	Title	Artist	Ref.
2026	"ความคิดถึงที่ไม่จำเป็น (Friend Zone)"	Krist Perawat (feat. Nanon Korapat)	
2026	"พระเอก (Prince Charming)"	Serious Bacon (feat. URBOYTJ)	

== Fanmeetings ==
Title	Date	Venue	Notes	Ref.
GMMTV International Novel Festival 2026	July 24, 2026	Samyan Mitrtown, 5th Fl.	With Felizz	
GMMTV Fanival: Happy Family	October 3, 2026	Union Hall, Union Mall	With Mewnich	
GMMTV Fanival: Happy Family	October 7, 2026	Union Hall, Union Mall	With Felizz	
