= Wish upon a Star =

Upcoming Thai television series

- Official pilot poster
- Thai: คืนนั้นฉันมองเห็นดาวด้วยตาเปล่า
- Genre: Girls' love; Romantic fantasy
- Screenplay by: Nichaphat Buranadilok; Pongsate Lucksameepong
- Directed by: Kornprom Niyomsil
- Starring: Pathitta Pornchumroenrut; Natticha Chantaravareelekha
- Country of origin: Thailand
- Original language: Thai

Production
- Executive producers: Sataporn Panichraksapong; Darapa Choeysanguan
- Production companies: GMMTV; Gemmistry Studio

Wish upon a Star (Thai: คืนนั้นฉันมองเห็นดาวด้วยตาเปล่า; RTGS: Khuen Nan Chan Mong Hen Dao Duai Ta Plao; lit. 'That Night I Could See Stars with the Naked Eye') is an upcoming Thai girls' love series starring Pathitta Pornchumroenrut (Pahn) and Natticha Chantaravareelekha (Fond).

Directed by Kornprom Niyomsil and produced by GMMTV together with Gemmistry Studio, it was announced at the GMMTV 2026: Magic Vibes Maximized event on 25 November 2025.

== Synopsis ==
A writer and an actress once crossed paths, only to be separated by death. When one of them manages to travel back in time, she's determined to change everything in hopes of saving the other's life.

== Cast and characters ==
=== Main ===
- Pathitta Pornchumroenrut (Pahn) as Dao (Star)
- Natticha Chantaravareelekha (Fond) as Dao (Satellite)

=== Supporting ===
- Krongkwan Nakornthap (Jaoying) as Anda
- Charisar Oldham (Chari) as Sandy
- Napapat Sattha-atikom (Chelsea) as Plaifah
