= When Oranges Fall =

2026 Thai television series

- Official series poster
- Thai: ต้นส้มบ้านเขา แต่ผลส้มหล่นมาบ้านเราตลอดเลย
- Genre: Coming-of-age; Romance; Boys' love
- Based on: ต้นส้มบ้านเขา แต่ผลส้มหล่นมาบ้านเราตลอดเลย by Littleskyofme
- Screenplay by: Thanaporn Phetcharas; Kirati Kumsat
- Directed by: Siwaj Sawatmaneekul
- Starring: Poomsuwan Suwansatit; Passawish Thamasungkeeti
- Opening theme: "คุ้มค่าการรอคอย (Worth the Wait)" by Almond Poomsuwan and Progress Passawish
- Ending theme: "ฤดูกาลที่มีเธอ (Season of You)" by Satang Kittiphop
- Composer: Sompob Pokepoon
- Country of origin: Thailand
- Original language: Thai
- No. of episodes: 12

Production
- Executive producers: Sataporn Panichraksapong; Darapa Choeysanguan
- Producers: Nuttapong Mongkolsawas; Supaporn Lertthitiverakarn
- Cinematography: Panpode Boonprasert; Theeranai Wongklom
- Running time: 41–54 minutes
- Production companies: GMMTV; Studio Wabi Sabi

Original release
- Network: GMM 25; OneD
- Release: 13 May – 29 July 2026

When Oranges Fall (Thai: ต้นส้มบ้านเขา แต่ผลส้มหล่นมาบ้านเราตลอดเลย; RTGS: Ton Som Ban Khao Tae Phon Som Lon Ma Ban Rao Talot Loei, lit. 'The Orange Tree Is at His House, but the Oranges Always Fall to My House') is a 2026 Thai coming-of-age boys' love television series adapted from the novel of the same name by Littleskyofme, starring Poomsuwan Suwansatit (Almond) and Passawish Thamasungkeeti (Progress).

Directed by Siwaj Sawatmaneekul and produced by GMMTV together with Studio Wabi Sabi, the series was announced at the GMMTV 2026: Magic Vibes Maximized event on 25 November 2025.

The series premiered on GMM 25 on 13 May 2026, airing every Wednesday at 20:30 ICT, and was made available for streaming on the OneD app at 21:30 ICT. The series concluded on 29 July 2026.

== Synopsis ==
A high school romance story begins when an orange from Ko Song’s (Poomsuwan Suwansatit) tree falls into the yard of Ko Neung (Passawish Thamasungkeeti), his neighbor and classmate who shares the same nickname but has a very different personality. Their relationship, which started with dislike, develops into a close friendship through the oranges on Ko Song’s tree. The series also explores the friendship of their group of friends; Augar (Kanthee Limpitikranon), Achi (Tanan Lohawatanakul) and August (Justin Angus Moir), as well as their roommate Tle (Sitthithat Tungtisanon), all set against the backdrop of 1990s high school life.

== Cast and characters ==
=== Main ===
- Poomsuwan Suwansatit (Almond) as Kanin Siritara (Ko Song)
- Passawish Thamasungkeeti (Progress) as Krittin Yingkhun (Ko Neung / Orange)
- Kanthee Limpitikranon (Ken) as Thawan Obkit (Augar)
- Tanan Lohawatanakul (Paul) as Achira Loetwarit (Achi)
- Justin Angus Moir as Thawin Obkit (August)
- Sitthithat Tungtisanon (Keaton) as Techin Rungcharoenchai (Tle)

=== Supporting ===
- Sujira Aroonpipat (Nui) as Ko Neung’s mother
- Poothanate Hongmanop (Captain) as Ko Neung’s father
- Thinnaphan Tantui (Thor) as Kong

== Original soundtrack ==
The official soundtrack for When Oranges Fall features:

Song	Artist(s)	Label	Ref.
"ฤดูกาลที่มีเธอ (Season of You)"	Satang Kittiphop	GMMTV Records	
"คุ้มค่าการรอคอย (Worth the Wait)"	Almond Poomsuwan and Progress Passawish	GMMTV Records	

== Production ==
After the series was announced by GMMTV during their GMMTV 2026: Magic Vibes Maximized event on 25 November 2025. Workshop for the series began on 1 February 2026. Principal photography began on 22 February 2026. The official trailer was revealed on 29 April 2026.

== Fan meetings ==
Year	Title	Date	Venue	Ref.
2026	When Oranges Fall: First Fall, First Love	13 May 2026	6th Fl. Siam Paragon - Siam Pavalai, Paragon Cineplex	
2026	When Oranges Fall: Final EP Fan Meeting	29 July 2026	Centralworld Pulse Hall, 6th Fl. Central World	
