= Pathitta Pornchumroenrut =

Thai actress (born 2004)

- ปทิตตา พรจำเริญรัตน์
- Born: 1 June 2004 (age 22); Thailand
- Other name: Pahn (ป่าน)
- Education: Chulalongkorn University
- Occupations: Actress; YouTuber; host
- Years active: 2024–present
- Agent: GMMTV
- Known for: Mudmee in My Love Mix-Up!; Dream in Leap Day; Puifai in Dare You to Death
- Height: 1.67 m (5 ft 6 in)

Pathitta Pornchumroenrut (Thai: ปทิตตา พรจำเริญรัตน์; born 1 June 2004), nicknamed Pahn (Thai: ป่าน), is a Thai actress. She is best known for her roles in My Love Mix-Up! (2024), Leap Day (2025), and Dare You to Death (2025).

== Early life and education ==
Pathitta was born on 1 June 2004 in Bangkok, Thailand. After graduating from Chonkanyanukoon School, she attended Chulalongkorn University's Faculty of Communication Arts, where she majored in Advertising and Brand Communication in the Department of Public Relations, graduating with first-class honours in October 2026. Outside of her studies, Pathitta is active as a beauty YouTuber on her channel @pahnn. A polyglot, she regularly features her language skills on her channel and speaks Thai, English, Japanese, Korean, Spanish, and Mandarin.

== Career ==
Pathitta began her acting career after signing with GMMTV in late 2023. In 2024, she made her television debut with a supporting role as Mudmee in the romantic comedy series My Love Mix-Up!, a Thai adaptation of the Japanese manga series of the same name. The following year, she received wider recognition for her role as Dream in the mystery thriller television series Leap Day. She then portrayed Puifai in the crime thriller series Dare You to Death and made a guest appearance as the young Panyada in the supernatural survival series The Dark Dice.

Outside of acting, Pathitta has worked as a multilingual interviewer, including interviewing South Korean boy group NCT Wish and the cast of The Manipulated in 2025. Later that year, she was announced as a lead actress in GMMTV's upcoming girls' love television series Wish Upon a Star, starring alongside Natticha Chantaravareelekha (Fond). The pair subsequently performed together at GMMTV's Blush Blossom Fan Fest 2026 in June 2026. She was later cast in Kiss Me, Stranger, again alongside Natticha, as well as the upcoming series I Wanna Hold Your Hand.

== Filmography ==
=== Television series ===
Key
†	Denotes television productions that have not yet been released

Year	Title	Role	Notes	Network	Ref.
2024	My Love Mix-Up!	"Mudmee" Monticha Phonglaksamee	Supporting role	GMM 25	
2025	Leap Day	"Dream" Phakhwan	Main role	GMM 25	
2025	The Dark Dice	"Pan" Panyada Phlanudet	Supporting role	GMM 25	
2025	Dare You to Death	"Fai" Puifai	Supporting role	GMM 25	
TBA	Wish upon a Star †	"Star" Dao	Main role	TBA	
TBA	Kiss Me, Stranger †	Dear	Main role	TBA	
TBA	I Wanna Hold Your Hand †	Yo	Supporting role	TBA	

=== Music video appearances ===
Year	Title	Artist(s)	Label	Ref.
2025	"จองตั๋วแล้วจองตัวเธอด้วยได้ปะ (Love Ticket)"	Tay Tawan, Nanon Korapat, Gemini Norawit and Fourth Nattawat	GMMTV Records	
2025	"หน้าเบลอหลังชัด (Foreground)"	LYKN	Riser Music	
2026	"ยิ่งห้ามยิ่งยุ (YHYU)"	Mirrr	What the Duck	
2026	"วันแรก (D-1)"	VVV	What the Duck	

== Fanmeetings ==
Title	Date	Venue	Notes	Ref.
Leap Day: Final Screening	24 June 2025	SF World Cinema, 9th Fl. CentralWorld	With Leap Day cast	
Dare You to Death Final EP Fanmeeting	26 February 2026	Centralworld Pulse Hall, 7th Fl. CentralWorld	With Dare You to Death cast	
GMMTV International Novel Festival 2026	26 July 2026	Samyan Mitrtown, 5th Fl.	With Fond Natticha	

== Concerts ==
Title	Date	Venue	Notes	Ref.
Blush Blossom Fan Fest: Midnight Bloom	13–14 June 2026	BITEC Live	With Fond, Milk, Love, Namtan, Film, Emi, Bonnie, View, Mim, Jan, JingJing, June, Mewnich, Kapook, Ciize	
JuniorMark Sunny Moon Concert	8 August 2026	BITEC Live	With Junior, Mark, Fond, Emi, Bonnie	
Blush Blossom Fan Fest: Midnight Bloom in Macau	24 October 2026	Fisherman’s Wharf Convention & Exhibition Center	With Fond, Milk, Love, Namtan, Film, Emi, Bonnie, View, Mim, Jan, JingJing, Kapook, Ciize	
Blush Blossom Fan Fest: Midnight Bloom in Kaohsiung	7 November 2026	Kaohsiung Music Center	With Fond, Milk, Love, Namtan, Film, Emi, Bonnie, View, Mim, Jan, JingJing, Kapook, Ciize	
