= Youniverse (web series) =

2018 Thai television series

- Official series poster
- Also known as: YOUniverse
- Thai: YOUniverse – จักรวาลเธอ
- Genre: Romance
- Created by: GMMTV
- Directed by: Pawis Sowsrion
- Starring: Korapat Kirdpan; Ployshompoo Supasap; Wachirawit Ruangwiwat; Rutricha Phapakithi
- Country of origin: Thailand
- Original language: Thai
- No. of episodes: 4

Production
- Running time: 8 – 11 minutes
- Production company: GMMTV

Original release
- Network: LINE TV; Facebook; YouTube
- Release: 24 April – 3 May 2018

Youniverse (styled as YOUniverse) (Thai: YOUniverse – จักรวาลเธอ; YOUniverse – ChakkRawan Thoe) is a 2018 Thai streaming television series starring Korapat Kirdpan (Nanon), Ployshompoo Supasap (Jan), Wachirawit Ruangwiwat (Chimon) and Rutricha Phapakithi (Ciize).

Directed by Pawis Sowsrion and produced by GMMTV, the series premiered on LINE TV, Facebook and YouTube on 24 April 2018, airing on Tuesdays and Thursdays at 18:00 ICT. It concluded on 3 May 2018.

== Cast and characters ==
Below are the cast of the series:

=== Main ===
- Korapat Kirdpan (Nanon) as Knight
- Ployshompoo Supasap (Jan) as Sun
- Wachirawit Ruangwiwat (Chimon) as Earth
- Rutricha Phapakithi (Ciize) as Nik

=== Guest ===
- Weerayut Chansook (Arm) as an ice cream shop owner

== Soundtrack ==
Song title	Romanized title	Artist	Ref.
เกมล่าเธอ	Chak Ra Wan Thoe	Korapat Kirdpan (Nanon)	
