= Leap Day (Thai TV series) =

2025 Thai television series

- Official series poster
- Thai: Leap Day วันแก้ตาย
- Genre: Thriller; Mystery; Fantasy; Teen drama
- Written by: Nepal Jitranon
- Directed by: Sakon Tiacharoen
- Starring: Jirawat Sutivanichsak; Naravit Lertratkosum; Atthaphan Phunsawat; Pathitta Pornchumroenrut
- Country of origin: Thailand
- Original language: Thai
- No. of episodes: 12

Production
- Running time: 41–52 minutes
- Production companies: GMMTV; Keng Kwang Kang Waisai

Original release
- Network: GMM 25; YouTube; Viu
- Release: 1 April – 24 June 2025

Leap Day (Thai: วันแก้ตาย; RTGS: Wan Kae Tai; lit. 'Day [to] Defy Death') is a Thai mystery thriller television series starring Jirawat Sutivanichsak (Dew), Naravit Lertratkosum (Pond), Atthaphan Phunsawat (Gun) and Pathitta Pornchumroenrut (Pahn).

Produced by GMMTV together with Keng Kwang Kang Waisai, it was announced at the GMMTV 2024: Up & Above Part 2 event held on 23 April 2024.

The series premiered on GMM 25 and Viu on 1 April 2025, airing on Tuesdays at 20:30 ICT and 22:30 ICT, respectively. The series concluded on 24 June 2025.

== Synopsis ==
Day (Naravit Lertratkosum) and Night (Jirawat Sutivanichsak), who were born on February 29, are both afflicted by a horrible curse that will take away their loved ones every four years. The curse's threat to others around them keeps the two isolated. One day, Night meets Dream (Pathitta Pornchumroenrut), his classmate who becomes his source of happiness. Meanwhile, Day is caring for Ozone (Atthaphan Phunsawat), an autistic kid of his distant relative after his mother dies. As Day and Night's twentieth birthday draws near, they become more concerned about their loved ones.

== Cast and characters ==
=== Main ===
- Jirawat Sutivanichsak (Dew) as Rattikan Chayutra (Night)
- Naravit Lertratkosum (Pond) as Itsara Jittiphat (Day)
- Atthaphan Phunsawat (Gun) as Ozone Anawin
- Pathitta Pornchumroenrut (Pahn) as Dream Phakhwan

=== Supporting ===
- Gandhi Wasuwitchayagit as Professor Wiwat

Night's lecturer at the medical school who was an active obstetrician-gynecologist that delivered Night and Day and shares the same birthday as them.

- Sirininatthakul (Pon) as Kittiphop Jarudej (Kit)

A doctor whose license was revoked and Professor Wiwat’s friend. He has the same fate as Professor Wiwat, Day, and Night as he was also born on February 29.

- Kirati Puangmalee (Title) as Win

Dream's senior who often flirts with her.

- Preeyaphat Lawsuwansiri (Earn) as Joy

Night's girlfriend who suddenly dies on his birthday after Night blows the candle.

== Soundtrack ==
Song title	English title	Artist	Ref.
"อยู่เพื่อรักเธอ"	"Here You Are"	Louis Thanawin, Ford Allan, Fluke Nattanon	
