= Loneliness Society =

2023 Thai television series

- Official series poster
- Thai: โคตรเหงา เรา2คน
- Genre: Romantic comedy
- Based on: While You Were Sleeping
- Screenplay by: Ping Lumpraploeng
- Directed by: Ekkasit Trakulkasemsuk
- Starring: Woranuch Bhirombhakdi; Way-Ar Sangngern; Sittha Sapanuchart
- Ending theme: "เหงา (Loneliness)" by Fluke Nattanon
- Country of origin: Thailand
- Original language: Thai
- No. of episodes: 14

Production
- Executive producers: Sataporn Panichraksapong; Darapa Choeysanguan
- Producer: Nuttapong Mongkolsawas
- Cinematography: Somboon Phopitakkul
- Running time: 50 minutes
- Production companies: GMMTV; Keng Kwang Kang Waisai

Original release
- Network: GMM 25; Viu
- Release: June 5 – July 18, 2023

Loneliness Society (Thai: โคตรเหงา เรา2คน; RTGS: Khot Ngao Rao Song Khon) is a 2023 Thai romantic comedy series starring Woranuch Bhirombhakdi (Nune), Way-Ar Sangngern (Joss) and Sittha Sapanuchart (Iang) adapted from the 1995 film While You Were Sleeping. It aired on GMM 25 on June 5, 2023, airing Mondays and Tuesdays at 20:30 ICT and streaming on Viu at 22:30 ICT the same day.

Directed by Ekkasit Trakulkasemsuk and produced by GMMTV and Keng Kwang Kang Waisai, it was announced at the GMMTV "Diversely Yours" event in November 2022.

== Synopsis ==
Meena (Woranuch Bhirombhakdi), a 30 year-old IT professional takes a job as a delivery person and meets Arthit (Sittha Sapanuchart), whom she falls in love with at first sight. One day, Arthit has an accident and is saved by Meena, who is roped into impersonating his girlfriend. Arthit's family is overjoyed to meet his "girlfriend", except for Thann (Way-Ar Sangngern), Arthit's younger brother, who doesnt believe her. Thann and Meena take care of Arthit until he recovers and they develop feelings for each other. However, new problems arises when Katie (Ployshompoo Supasap), Arthit's real girlfriend, appears and develops feelings for Thann. How will the relationships between these four people end? Ultimately, who will win Meena's heart?

== Cast and characters ==
=== Main ===
- Woranuch Bhirombhakdi (Nune) as Meena Srinakkharin / Rabbit
- Way-Ar Sangngern (Joss) as Thann Saengsawang / Turtle
- Sittha Sapanuchart (Iang) as Arthit Sunthornpodjanaruj

=== Supporting ===
- Ployshompoo Supasap (Jan) as Katie
- Naravit Lertratkosum (Pond) as Alan Sunthornpodjanaruj
- Krongkwan Nakornthap (Jaoying) as Khaotung
- Yanee Jongwisut (Tuk) as Raynu Sunthornpodjanaruj
- Nathapatsorn Simasthien (Dao) as Earng
- Pachchun Hiranprateep (Chun) as Ball
- Jirawat Vachirasarunpatra (War) as Manit Sunthornpodjanaruj
- Warinda Damrongphol (Dada) as Linda Sunthornpodjanaruj
- Sumet Ong as Jek Sunthornpodjanaruj
- Thanik Kamontharanon (Pawin) as James

=== Guest ===
- Suphach Tawsagun (Boky) as Arthit (young)
- Natee Chawapong (Kai) as Doctor (Ep. 2-4)

== Original soundtrack ==
The official soundtrack for Loneliness Society features:

Song	Artist(s)	Label	Ref.
"เหงา (Loneliness)"	Fluke Nattanon	GMMTV Records	
