= Poomsuwan Suwansatit =

Thai actor and singer (born 2007)

- ภูมิสุวรรณ สุวรรณสถิตย์
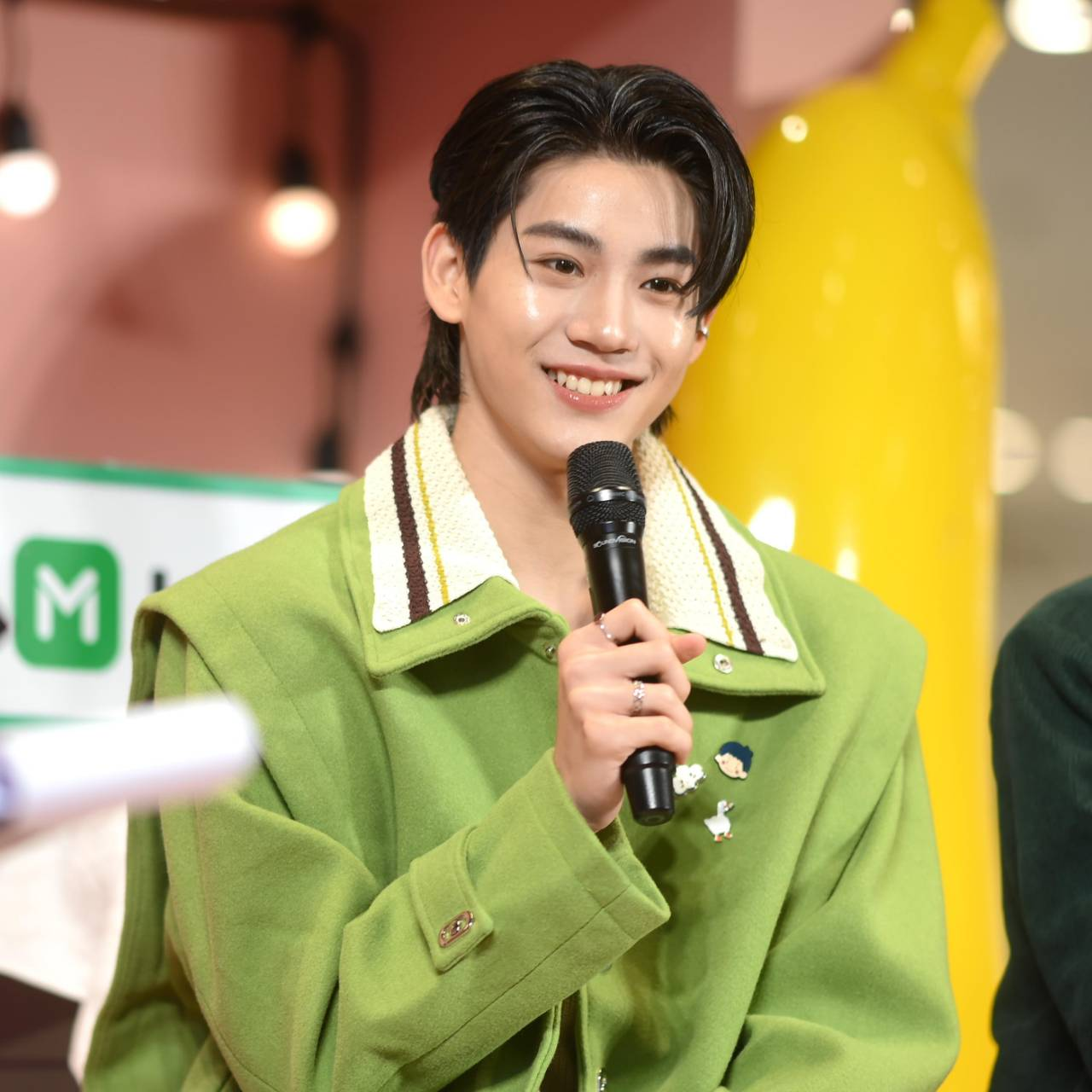
- Poomsuwan in 2024
- Born: 30 October 2007 (age 19); Thailand
- Other name: Almond (แอลม่อน)
- Education: Yothinburana School
- Occupations: Actor; singer
- Years active: 2024–present
- Agents: Tia51 (2024-2025); GMMTV (2025-present)
- Known for: Pun in Love Sick; Ko Song in When Oranges Fall
- Height: 1.85 m (6 ft 1 in)
- Website: GMMTV Artists

Poomsuwan Suwansatit (Thai: ภูมิสุวรรณ สุวรรณสถิตย์), nicknamed Almond (Thai: แอลม่อน), is a Thai actor and singer under GMMTV. He is known for his lead roles in the series Love Sick (2024) and When Oranges Fall (2026).

== Early life and education ==
Poomsuwan was born on 30 October, 2007, in Thailand. He graduated from Yothinburana School in February 2026.

== Career ==
Almond made his acting debut in 2024 in the series Love Sick, playing the character Pun. The same year, he recorded the song "ขอแค่เป็น" for the series' soundtrack.

In May 2025, Almond left his agency Tia51 and signed a contract with GMMTV.

In 2026, he starred in the series When Oranges Fall, alongside Passawish Thamasungkeeti (Progress), playing Khanin Sirithara (Ko Song). The series premiered on 13 May 2026.

== Filmography ==
=== Television series ===
Key
†	Denotes television productions that have not yet been released

Year	Title	Role	Notes	Network	Ref.
2024	Love Sick	Pun	Main role	MCOT	
2026	When Oranges Fall	Khanin Sirithara (Ko Song)	Main role	GMM 25	
TBA	Love After Class †	Pope	Main role	TBA	

=== Music video appearances ===
Year	Title	Artist	Label	Ref.
2026	"ฤดูกาลที่มีเธอ (Season of You)"; When Oranges Fall OST	Satang Kittiphop	GMMTV Records	
2026	"Butterflies"	Krist Perawat ft. Pup Potato	Riser Music	

== Discography ==
=== Soundtrack appearances ===
Year	Title	Soundtrack	Label	Ref.
2024	"สั่น (Shake)" with Love Sick cast	Love Sick OST	Tia51	
2024	"ขอแค่เป็น"	Love Sick OST	Tia51	
2024	"ให้เธอเป็นทะเล" with Progress Passawish	Love Sick OST	Tia51	
2026	"คุ้มค่าการรอคอย (Worth the wait)" with Progress Passawish	When Oranges Fall OST	GMMTV Records	

== Fan meetings ==
Title	Date	Venue	Notes	Ref.
Love Sick First Step	17 August 2024	Major Cineplex Sukhumvit-Ekkamai	With Love Sick cast	
Love Sick Back to School	14 September 2024	Siam Pavalai Royal Grand Theatre	With Love Sick cast	
Love Sick Midterm Friday College	19 October 2024	Tia51, Tipco Tower 2	With Love Sick cast	
Love Sick 2024 Farewell: Final EP. Fan Meeting	21 December 2024	Siam Pavalai Royal Grand Theatre	With Love Sick cast	
Love Sick 2024 Fan Sign	15 February 2025	Kbank Siam Pre-Ganesha Hall	With Love Sick cast	
Friday Playground 1st Fan Meet	10 May 2025	Union Hall, Union Mall	With Love Sick cast	
GMMTV Fan Day 22 in Osaka	20 July 2025	Cool Japan Park Osaka WW Hall	With Progress	
GMMTV Fan Day 26 in Vietnam	23 November 2025	Ben Thanh Theatre	With Progress	
When Oranges Fall: First Fall, First Love	13 May 2026	Siam Pavalai Royal Grand Theatre	With When Oranges Fall cast	
When Oranges Fall: Final EP Fan Meeting	29 July 2026	CentralWorld Pulse Hall, CentralWorld	With When Oranges Fall cast	
GMMTV FanDay 35 in Vietnam	26 September 2026	Nguyen Du Gymnasium, Ho Chi Minh City	With Progress	
GMMTV Fan Day 39 in Taipei	31 October 2026	Zepp New Taipei	With Progress	
GMMTV Fan Event in Tokyo	5 December 2026	Animate Theater	With Progress	
AlmondProgress Fan Meeting in Thailand	23 January 2027	MCC Hall, The Mall Lifestore Bangkapi	With Progress	

== Concerts ==
Title	Date	Venue	Notes	Ref.
GMMTV Starlympics	20 December 2025	Impact Arena	GMMTV Artists	
GMMTV Fan Fest 2026: Macau	8 August 2026	The Venetian Cotai Expo Hall	With Progress, Boun, Prem, Pond, Phuwin, Joong, Dunk, Jimmy, Sea, Gemini, Fourth, Perth, Santa	
Nineentertain 24th Anniversary Charity Concert	30 September 2026	Parc Paragon, Siam Paragon	With Progress, Krist, Jan, JingJing, Felizz, Clo'ver	

== Awards and nominations ==
Year	Award	Category	Work	Result	Ref.
2024	Thailand Box Office Awards	Rookie of the Year with Progress Passawish	Love Sick	Won	
2025	Kazz Awards	Couple of the Year with Progress Passawish	—N/a	Nominated	
2025	Kazz Awards	Rising Male of The Year	—N/a	Nominated	
2025	Mint Awards	Rookie of the Year with Progress Passawish	—N/a	Nominated	
2026	Praew Awards	Rising Star of the Year with Progress Passawish	—N/a	Won	
