= Passawish Thamasungkeeti =

Thai actor and singer (born 2009)

- ภาสวิชญ์ ธรรมสังคีติ
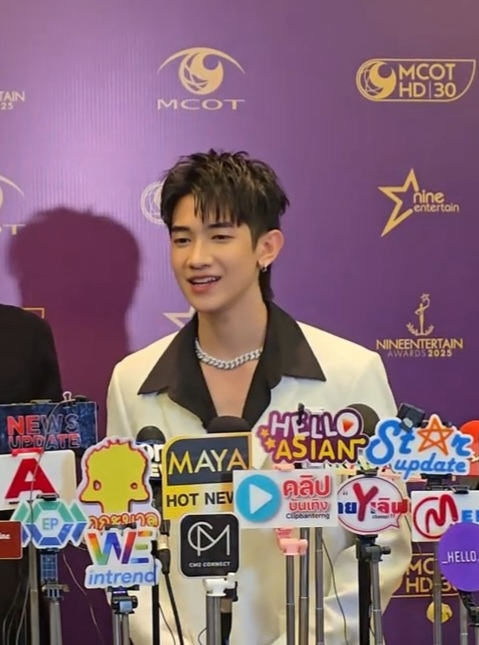
- Passawish in May 2025
- Born: 26 March 2009 (age 17); Thailand
- Other name: Progress (โปรเกรส)
- Education: Saint Gabriel's College
- Occupations: Actor; singer
- Years active: 2024–present
- Agents: Tia51 (2024–2025); GMMTV (2025–present)
- Known for: No in Love Sick; Ko Neung in When Oranges Fall
- Height: 1.77 m (5 ft 10 in)

Passawish Thamasungkeeti (Thai: ภาสวิชญ์ ธรรมสังคีติ; born 26 March 2009), nicknamed Progress (Thai: โปรเกรส), is a Thai actor and singer under GMMTV. He is known for his lead roles in the series Love Sick (2024) and When Oranges Fall (2026).

== Early life and education ==
Passawish was born on 26 March, 2009, in Thailand. He is currently attending high school at Saint Gabriel's College.

== Career ==
In November 2023, Tia51 announced the remake of the series Love Sick with Progress in the lead role of No. In April 2024, he participated in the blessing ceremony for the series.

In June 2024, he participated in the recording of the song "สั่น (Shake)" for the Love Sick soundtrack. The series premiered on 14 September 2024, with Progress starring opposite Poomsuwan Suwansatit (Almond) as his romantic partner.

In May 2025, Progress left Tia51 and signed a contract with GMMTV.

In 2026, he starred in the series When Oranges Fall alongside Almond, playing Krittin (Ko Neung). The series premiered on 13 May 2026 on GMM 25.

== Filmography ==
=== Television series ===
Year	Title	Role	Network	Notes	Ref.
2024	Love Sick	No	MCOT	Main role	
2026	When Oranges Fall	Krittin Yingkhun (Ko Neung / Orange)	GMM 25	Main role	
TBA	Love After Class †	Third	TBA	Main role	

=== Music video appearances ===
Year	Title	Artist(s)	Label	Ref.
2024	"รักศาสตร์"; Love Sick OST	Krit Ngamtanakijja, Toto Thayawat, Chok Ditheechok, VJ Phongphan	Tia51	
2026	"ฤดูกาลที่มีเธอ (Season of You)"; When Oranges Fall OST	Satang Kittiphop	GMMTV Records	
2026	"Butterflies"	Krist Perawat ft. Pup Potato	Riser Music	

== Discography ==
=== Soundtrack appearances ===
Year	Title	Album	Label	Ref.
2024	"สั่น (Shake)" with Love Sick 2024 cast	Love Sick OST	Tia51	
2024	"ให้เธอเป็นทะเล" with Almond Poomsuwan	Love Sick OST	Tia51	
2024	"ถ้าหากรักมีจริง"	Love Sick OST	Tia51	
2024	"เธอเชื่อเรื่องพรหมลิขิตหรือเปล่า"	Love Sick OST	Tia51	
2026	"คุ้มค่าการรอคอย (Worth the wait)" with Almond Poomsuwan	When Oranges Fall OST	GMMTV Records	

== Fan meetings ==
Title	Date	Venue	Notes	Ref.
Love Sick First Step	17 August 2024	Major Cineplex Sukhumvit-Ekkamai	With Love Sick cast	
Love Sick Back to School	14 September 2024	Siam Pavalai Royal Grand Theatre	With Love Sick cast	
Love Sick Midterm Friday College	19 October 2024	Tia51, Tipco Tower 2	With Love Sick cast	
Love Sick 2024 Farewell: Final EP. Fan Meeting	21 December 2024	Siam Pavalai Royal Grand Theatre	With Love Sick cast	
Love Sick 2024 Fan Sign	15 February 2025	Kbank Siam Pre-Ganesha Hall	With Love Sick cast	
Friday Playground 1st Fan Meet	10 May 2025	Union Hall, Union Mall	With Love Sick cast	
GMMTV FanDay 22 in Osaka	20 July 2025	Cool Japan Park Osaka WW Hall	With Almond	
GMMTV Fan Day 26 in Vietnam	23 November 2025	Ben Thanh Theatre	With Almond	
When Oranges Fall: First Fall, First Love	13 May 2026	Siam Pavalai Royal Grand Theatre	With When Oranges Fall cast	
When Oranges Fall: Final EP Fan Meeting	29 July 2026	CentralWorld Pulse Hall, CentralWorld	With When Oranges Fall cast	
GMMTV Fan Day 35 in Vietnam	26 September 2026	Nguyen Du Gymnasium, Ho Chi Minh City	With Almond	
GMMTV Fan Day 39 in Taipei	31 October 2026	Zepp New Taipei	With Almond	
GMMTV Fan Event in Tokyo	5 December 2026	Animate Theater	With Almond	
AlmondProgress Fan Meeting in Thailand	23 January 2027	MCC Hall, The Mall Lifestore Bangkapi	With Almond	

== Concerts ==
Title	Date	Venue	Notes	Ref.
GMMTV Starlympics	20 December 2025	Impact Arena	GMMTV Artists	
GMMTV Fan Fest 2026: Macau	8 August 2026	The Venetian Cotai Expo Hall	With Almond, Boun, Prem, Pond, Phuwin, Joong, Dunk, Jimmy, Sea, Gemini, Fourth, Perth, Santa	
Nineentertain 24th Anniversary Charity Concert	30 September 2026	Parc Paragon, Siam Paragon	With Almond, Krist, Jan, JingJing, Felizz, Clo'ver	

== Awards and nominations ==
Year	Award	Category	Work	Result	Ref.
2024	Thailand Box Office Awards	Rookie of the Year with Almond Poomsuwan	Love Sick	Won	
2025	Nine Entertain Awards	New Rising Star on Screen with Almond Poomsuwan	Love Sick	Nominated	
2025	Kazz Awards	Couple of the Year with Almond Poomsuwan	Love Sick	Nominated	
2025	Kazz Awards	Rising Male Actor of the Year	Love Sick	Nominated	
2025	Y Entertain Awards	New Generation Couple with Almond Poomsuwan	Love Sick	Nominated	
2025	Y Universe Awards	Rising Artist	—N/a	Nominated	
2026	Praew Awards	Rising Star of the Year with Almond Poomsuwan	—N/a	Won	
