= App War =

2018 Thai romantic comedy-drama film by Yanyong Kuruangkura

- Theatrical release poster
- Thai: แอปชนแอป
- Directed by: Yanyong Kuruangkura
- Screenplay by: Phuwanit Pholdee; Sutthipong Phanthanalai; Rangsima Akarawiwat
- Produced by: Amornthep Sukmanont; Charoen Kaithitisuwan; Genwaii Thongdenok; Nitcha-orn Palakon
- Starring: Nat Kitcharit; Varitsara Yu; Sirat Intarachote; Patchanan Jiajirachote; Apiwit Reardon; Ticha Wongtipkanon; Tanaphop Yoovichit
- Cinematography: Phaklao Jiraungkoonkun
- Edited by: Artit Kenchompoo; Rachaphun Phisutsinthop; Chaloemkiat Saeyong; Teerapat Charoenpukdi; Manussa Vorasingha
- Music by: Chapavich Temnitikul
- Production companies: TMoment; Foolhouse Production
- Distributed by: TMoment
- Release date: 1 August 2018 (Thailand)
- Running time: 130 minutes
- Country: Thailand
- Language: Thai
- Box office: ฿17.8 Million

App War (Thai: แอปชนแอป; RTGS: Aep Chon Aep) is a 2018 Thai romantic comedy-drama film directed by Yanyong Kuruangkura. It stars Nat Kitcharit, Varitsara Yu (JingJing), Patchanan Jiajirachote (Orn), Sirat Intarachote (Too), Tanaphop Yoovichit (Third), Ticha Wongtipkanon and Apiwit Reardon (Rang). The film follows two entrepreneurs, Bomb and June, who become rivals after serendipitous encounters as they compete for investment in a national start-up competition by developing similar apps.

Produced and distributed by TMoment with the co-production of Foolhouse Production, the film was theatrically released in Thailand on August 1, 2018.

== Cast and characters ==
=== Main ===
- Nat Kitcharit as Bomb

A programmer on the Inviter team whose niche interests make him feel out of place, prompting him to build an app that unites people with shared interests to connect and interact.

- Varitsara Yu (JingJing) as June

A marketing member on the Amjoin team who faces pressure from her father, hoping to break her twelve-competition losing streak before being forced to give up her ambitions to work for the family company.

=== Supporting ===
- Patchanan Jiajirachote (Orn) as Mild

A new intern at Amjoin assigned to investigate the Inviter startup, only to find herself living and working within both teams.

- Sirat Intarachote (Too) as Tai

A graphic designer on the Inviter team who, despite his hesitation, acts as an undercover spy for Amjoin where he eventually discovers the meaning in his work.

- Apiwit Reardon (Rang) as Build

A marketing member on the Inviter team known for his intense and straightforward personality, whose relentless drive often leads him to sacrifice anything to achieve his goals.

- Ticha Wongtipkanon as Fai

A software engineer on the Amjoin team whose ambitious nature and feisty temperament drive her to achieve her goals by any means necessary.

- Tanaphop Yoovichit (Third) as Bun

A creative designer on the Amjoin team who is strong willed and confident, known for his artistic vision, varied fashion sense, and loyalty to his friends.

== Soundtrack ==
- "Keep Going" (App War version) by Boom Boom Cash

== Release and reception ==
App War earned ฿1.3 million on its opening day, with an additional ฿2.02 million brought in from early Wednesday screenings. It grossed ฿8.64 million after its first weekend of release and finished its theatrical run with a total revenue of ฿17.8 million.

== Accolades ==
Award	Year	Category	Recipient(s)	Result
28th Suphannahong National Film Awards	2019	Best Film Director	Yanyong Kuruangkura	Nominated
28th Suphannahong National Film Awards	2019	Best Leading Actress	Varitsara Yu	Nominated
28th Suphannahong National Film Awards	2019	Best Supporting Actress	Patchanan Jiajirachote	Nominated
28th Suphannahong National Film Awards	2019	Outstanding Cinematography	Phaklao Jiraungkoonkun	Nominated
28th Suphannahong National Film Awards	2019	Best Film Editing	Foolhouse Production	Nominated
28th Suphannahong National Film Awards	2019	Best Sound Editing and Mixing	Kantana Group	Nominated
28th Suphannahong National Film Awards	2019	Best Costume Design	Pawaret Wongaram	Nominated
28th Suphannahong National Film Awards	2019	Outstanding Art Direction	Toey Jaruwateekul	Nominated
15th Kom Chad Luek Awards	2019	Best Film Director	Yanyong Kuruangkura	Nominated
15th Kom Chad Luek Awards	2019	Best Leading Actress	Varitsara Yu	Won
27th Bangkok Critics Assembly Awards	2019	Best Picture	—N/a	Nominated
27th Bangkok Critics Assembly Awards	2019	Best Director	Yanyong Kuruangkura	Nominated
27th Bangkok Critics Assembly Awards	2019	Best Leading Actor	Nat Kitcharit	Nominated
27th Bangkok Critics Assembly Awards	2019	Best Leading Actress	Varitsara Yu	Nominated
27th Bangkok Critics Assembly Awards	2019	Best Supporting Actor	Sirat Intarachote	Nominated
27th Bangkok Critics Assembly Awards	2019	Best Supporting Actress	Patchanan Jiajirachote	Nominated
27th Bangkok Critics Assembly Awards	2019	Best Screenplay	Phuwanit Pholdee, Sutthipong Phanthanalai, Rangsima Akarawiwat	Nominated
27th Bangkok Critics Assembly Awards	2019	Excellent Cinematography	Foolhouse Production	Nominated
27th Bangkok Critics Assembly Awards	2019	Outstanding Production Design	Toey Jaruwateekul	Nominated
27th Bangkok Critics Assembly Awards	2019	Outstanding Original Score	Chapavich Temnitikul	Nominated
9th Thai Film Director Awards	2019	Best Picture	—N/a	Nominated
9th Thai Film Director Awards	2019	Best Director	Yanyong Kuruangkura	Runner-up
9th Thai Film Director Awards	2019	Best Leading Actress	Varitsara Yu	Nominated
9th Thai Film Director Awards	2019	Best Supporting Actress	Patchanan Jiajirachote	Nominated
9th Thai Film Director Awards	2019	Best Supporting Actor	Sirat Intarachote	Nominated
9th Thai Film Director Awards	2019	Best Screenplay	Phuwanit Pholdee, Sutthipong Phanthanalai, Rangsima Akarawiwat	Nominated
16th Starpics Thai Film Awards	2019	Best Leading Actor	Nat Kitcharit	Nominated
16th Starpics Thai Film Awards	2019	Best Leading Actress	Varitsara Yu	Nominated
16th Starpics Thai Film Awards	2019	Best Supporting Actor	Sirat Intarachote	Nominated
16th Starpics Thai Film Awards	2019	Best Cinematography	Phaklao Jiraungkoonkun	Nominated
16th Starpics Thai Film Awards	2019	Best Editing	Ratchaphan Phisutsinthop, Chaloemkiat Saeyong, Thirapat Charoenpakdee, Manussa Vorasingha, Artid Kenchompu	Nominated
16th Starpics Thai Film Awards	2019	Outstanding Production Design	Toey Jaruwateekul	Nominated
