= Hide & Sis =

2025 Thai television series

- Official series poster
- Thai: น้องสาวหายนะ
- Genre: Drama; Mystery; Romantic thriller
- Created by: GMMTV
- Based on: Phloeng Buppha (เพลิงบุปผา) by Jinatcha Maneesriwong
- Directed by: Tawan Charuchinda
- Starring: Ployshompoo Supasap; Sarunchana Apisamaimongkol; Prariyapit Yu; Kanyarat Ruangrung
- Ending theme: "Hide (หาย)" by Sarunchana Apisamaimongkol, Thasorn Klinnium
- Country of origin: Thailand
- Original language: Thai
- No. of episodes: 14

Production
- Executive producer: Sataporn Panichraksapong
- Producer: Snap25
- Running time: 46 minutes
- Production companies: GMMTV; Snap25

Original release
- Network: GMM25; Viu
- Release: 30 June – 12 August 2025

Hide & Sis (Thai: น้องสาวหายนะ; RTGS: Nong Sao Haiyana; lit. 'Disastrous younger sister') is a 2025 Thai television series starring Ployshompoo Supasap (Jan), Sarunchana Apisamaimongkol (Aye), Prariyapit Yu (JingJing) and Kanyarat Ruangrung (Piploy). Based on the novel Phloeng Buppha by Jinatcha Maneesriwong (Baison), the series follows Bupphachinda sisters who have their family secrets slowly unveiled after their youngest sister falls from the top floor of their vacation home and disappears.

Directed by Tawan Charuchinda and produced by GMMTV together with Snap25, the series was announced as one of the television series of GMMTV for 2024 during their "GMMTV2024: UP&ABOVE Part 2" event on April 23, 2024. It officially premiered on June 30, 2025, airing on Mondays and Tuesdays at 20:30 ICT on GMM25 and 22:30 ICT on Viu. The series concluded on August 12, 2025 with 14 episodes.

== Synopsis ==
Chatfah (Kanyarat Ruangrung), the youngest sister of the Bupphachinda family who recently received the largest inheritance from her father and is about to get married, falls from the top floor of the vacation home, leaving her three elder sisters stunned. However, her body vanishes. The three older sisters, Baibua (Ployshompoo Supasap), Chompoo (Sarunchana Apisamaimongkol), and Picha (Prariyapit Yu), who have become suspects, must find out the truth. The more they investigate, the more they discover a rotten relationship hidden behind the word "family."

== Cast and characters ==
=== Main ===
- Ployshompoo Supasap (Jan) as Boontharika Bupphachinda (Baibua)
- Sarunchana Apisamaimongkol (Aye) as Chompoonut Bupphachinda (Chompoo)
- Prariyapit Yu (JingJing) as Putpichaya Bupphachinda (Picha)
- Kanyarat Ruangrung (Piploy) as Chatfah Bupphachinda

=== Supporting ===
- Phatchatorn Thanawat (Ployphach) as Parn
- Gawin Caskey (Fluke) as Khem
- Luke Ishikawa Plowden as Arch
- Tanutchai Wijitvongtong (Mond) as Nathat
- Wachirawit Ruangwiwat (Chimon) as Thana
- Sivakorn Lertchuchot (Guy) as Chain
- Paramej Noiam (Plai) as Asoksapun Bupphachinda (Asok)
- Surawut Maikun (Noom) as Kajorn
- Naiyana Kachasang as Chomchai (Bupphachinda's maid)
- Duangdao Jarujinda as Nathat's grandmother
- Ramavadee Nakchudtree (Pupae)

=== Guest ===
- Juthapich Indrajundra (Jamie) as Sara
- Peter Tuinstra as Chatchai
- Namthip Siamthong

== Awards and nominations ==
Award nominations for Hide & Sis
Year	Award	Category	Nominee(s)	Result	Ref.
2025	Asian Academy Creative Awards	Best Actress in a Supporting Role	Kanyarat Ruangrung	Won	
2025	30th Asian Television Awards	Best Actress in a Leading Role	Sarunchana Apisamaimongkol	Nominated	
2025	30th Asian Television Awards	Best Actress in a Supporting Role	Kanyarat Ruangrung	Nominated	
2026	ContentAsia Awards 2026	Best Original Song Created in Asia for an Asian TV Series/Programme or Movie	"Hide (หาย)"	Pending	
