= The Heart Killers =

2024–25 Thai television series

- Official series poster
- Thai: เขาจ้างให้ผมจีบนักฆ่า
- Genre: Action; Comedy
- Inspired by: The Taming of the Shrew by Shakespeare; 10 Things I Hate About You
- Screenplay by: Tichakorn Phukhaotung; Kanokphan Ornrattanakahul; Issaraporn Kuntisuk; Fleur Irene Insot
- Directed by: Tichakorn Phukhaotung
- Starring: Kanaphan Puitrakul; Thanawat Rattanakitpaisan; Archen Aydin; Natachai Boonprasert
- Opening theme: "Destroy Love" by Khaotung Thanawat
- Ending theme: "Destroy Love" by Khaotung Thanawat (Ep. 1–5) "รักแรงทะลุนรก (Fast Love)" by Dunk Natachai (Ep. 6–7) "เจ้าความรัก (Hurt Me Please)" by Joong Archen (Ep. 8–9) "เชื้อเพลิง (My Fuel)" by First Kanaphan (Ep. 10–12)
- Country of origin: Thailand
- Original language: Thai
- No. of episodes: 12

Production
- Executive producers: Sataporn Panichraksapong; Darapa Choeysanguan
- Producer: Noppharnach Chaiyahwimhon
- Production location: Thailand
- Running time: 44–66 minutes
- Production companies: GMMTV; GMO Films

Original release
- Network: GMM 25 iQIYI; GagaOOLala; YouTube
- Release: November 20, 2024 – February 12, 2025

The Heart Killers (Thai: เขาจ้างให้ผมจีบนักฆ่า, RTGS: Khao Chang Hai Phom Chip Nakkha) is a 2024 Thai action-comedy television series starring Kanaphan Puitrakul (First), Thanawat Rattanakitpaisan (Khaotung), Archen Aydin (Joong), and Natachai Boonprasert (Dunk). The series, directed by Tichakorn Phukhaotung and produced by GMMTV and GMO Films, was announced at the GMMTV 2024 "Up&Above" Part 2 event on April 23, 2024. It premiered on GMM 25 on November 20, 2024, airing on Wednesdays at 20:30 ICT. The series is also available for the uncut version on iQIYI (Canada, USA & Thailand), GagaOOLala (Australia, Germany & UK), and on GMMTV Official YouTube Channel (Worldwide, except Canada & Thailand). The series was concluded on February 12, 2025 with a fan meeting.

== Synopsis ==
Tattooist Kant (First) works as a spy for the police. When he's tasked to investigate a pair of gunman brothers, he finds that one of them is a one-night stand he hasn't been able to forget—Bison (Khaotung). The two assassins own a hamburger shop. Kant goes there and focuses his efforts on charming Bison into giving up information. When his attempts are thwarted by Bison's scary, protective older brother, Fadel (Joong), he hires someone who can take him on.

He enlists the help of his handsome best friend, Style (Dunk), who's a pain in the neck and not afraid of anything. Mechanic Style once rearended Fadel, and they fought. Kant promises Style the car he'd had his eyes on if he can win Fadel's heart. If his mission is successful, Kant's been promised a clean criminal record so he can start a new life.

== Cast and characters ==
=== Main ===
- Kanaphan Puitrakul (First) as Kant Pattanawat
- Thanawat Rattanakitpaisan (Khaotung) as Aechitpol Phanlert (Bison)
- Archen Aydin (Joong) as Fadel Kasemsan
- Natachai Boonprasert (Dunk) as Sattawat Chayakorn (Style)

=== Supporting ===
- Thanaporn Wagprayoan (Parn) as Lily
- Peter Tuinstra as Captain/Christ
- Phanuroj Chalermkijporntavee (Pepper) as Keen
- Chayakorn Jutamas (JJ) as Thanon
- Kanthee Limpitikranon (Ken) as Babe (Kant's brother)
- Tanan Lohawatanakul (Paul) as Knot
- Jeeratch Wongpian (Fluke) as Fluke
- Jatuporn Dangurai (Jay) as James
- Chaiwat Singha (Jeab) as Jay (Style's father)
- Nashisha Nunchanok (Muay) as Penpak

== Soundtrack ==
| Title | Artist | Ref. |
|---|---|---|
| "Destroy Love" | Thanawat Rattanakitpaisan (Khaotung) | |
| "รักแรงทะลุนรก (Fast Love)" | Natachai Boonprasert (Dunk) | |
| "เจ้าความรัก (Hurt Me Please)" | Archen Aydin (Joong) | |
| "เชื้อเพลิง (My Fuel)" | Kanaphan Puitrakul (First) | |
| "ตื๊อเท่านั้นที่ครองโลก (Never Back Down)" | Kanaphan Puitrakul (First), Thanawat Rattanakitpaisan (Khaotung), Archen Aydin (Joong), Natachai Boonprasert (Dunk) | |

== Production ==
=== Development ===
After the release of the pilot trailer on April 23, the director Tichakorn Phukhaotung (Jojo) posted on X that the series will be a loose adaptation of The Taming of the Shrew by William Shakespeare and the movie 10 Things I Hate About You. He also stated that he is very excited to finally be able to apply his literature major into a series.

=== Casting ===
On June 21, the series' official account shared a photo of the cast gathered for a reading session before the fittings photoshoot the next day. On July 3, the cast and production crew arranged a worship ceremony for a safe and smooth filming process.

=== Filming ===
On July 18, the series started to principal photography. The news was announced through both official accounts on X and Instagram. Even though Dunk was missing as he was still wrapping up his previous series, Summer Night, before joining the rest of the cast on July 28. The filming wrapped up on October 30.

== Media ==
The GMMTV Shop announced on October 7 that the series would be adapted into a novel, which would be released on October 17 as part of the Book Expo Thailand 2024 event. The event was held in Bangkok's Queen Sirikit Convention Centre from October 10 to 20, 2024.

The novel's author, Nottakorn, stated that the writing process was different for this novel. Typically, a novel is adapted into a series; however, this time it was the opposite. She received the series' script and wrote a novel based upon it. The cast of the series convinced her to accept the job as the novel's author, as she was already preoccupied with other projects when she received the proposal.

== Release ==
They announced via several GMMTV official accounts that the official trailer for THK would be released later that day, on November 1. At the same time, the series' main cast attended iQIYI iJOY TH 2025 event as one of the streaming platforms for the uncut version of the series. The official trailer was released during the event.

On November 14, GagaOOLala announced that the series will be available on their platform starting on November 20 in Australia, Germany, and the UK, while starting on December 21 in the US.

The production revealed that the series will air EP 6 as scheduled, which is on Christmas Day, but take a break on the New Year. The series will resume airing on January 8, 2025, for EP 7.

On February 20, the series is also available on OneD Thailand, a mobile app where users can access a wide range of Thai entertainment content like dramas, series, variety shows, and concerts, primarily from producers like GMMTV, GMM25, One31, and other top studios within the Thai entertainment industry.

On March 12, iQIYI Korea, through their social media, stated that a few GMMTV series will be available on their site soon. Those series are the upcoming series My Golden Blood on March 12 and Sweet Tooth, Good Dentist on March 20, while The Heart Killers and We Are will be available on March 21.

== Tours ==
| Year | Title | Date | Venue | Ref. |
|---|---|---|---|---|
| 2024 | The Heart Killers : Love at First Kill | November 20, 2024 | Siam Pavalai Theatre, Paragon Cineplex, Siam Paragon | |
| 2025 | The Heart Killers : Never Back Down Fan Party | February 12, 2025 | MCC Hall Fl. 4, The Mall Lifestore Ngamwongwan, Nonthaburi, Thailand | |
| 2025 | The Heart Killers Fan Meeting in Vietnam | April 5, 2025 | District 10, Ho Chi Minh City, Vietnam | |
| 2025 | The Heart Killers Fan Meeting in Macao | April 19, 2025 | The Venetian Theatre, The Venetian Macao | |
| 2025 | The Heart Killers Escape to Americas Tour | July 5, 2025 | Terra SP, São Paulo, Brazil | |
| 2025 | The Heart Killers Escape to Americas Tour | July 10, 2025 | Theatre Metropolitan, Mexico City, Mexico | |
| 2025 | The Heart Killers Escape to Americas Tour | July 12, 2025 | United Palace, New York, USA | |
| 2025 | The Heart Killers Fan Meeting in Manila | July 19, 2025 | Up Theater, Manila, Philippines | |
| 2025 | The Heart Killers Fan Meeting in Osaka | July 21, 2025 | Cool Japan Park Osaka WW Hall, Osaka, Japan | |
| 2025 | The Heart Killers - GMMTV FANDAY 24 in Singapore | September 6, 2025 | D'Marquee @Downtoen East, Singapure | |
