= Enemies with Benefits =

2026 Thai television series

- Official series poster
- Thai: ลัลล์ไม่ชอบไวน์
- Genre: Girls' love; Romantic comedy
- Based on: Enemies with Benefits (ลัลล์ไม่ชอบไวน์) by Snow Leopard (เสือดาวหิมะ)
- Screenplay by: Jinatcha Maneesriwong
- Directed by: Tawan Charuchinda; Arisa Wawwanjit
- Starring: Ployshompoo Supasap; JingJing Yu
- Opening theme: "งั้นรักละ (Don’t Wanna, but I Do)" by Jan Ployshompoo and JingJing Yu
- Ending theme: "Wine I Hate You?" by Jan Ployshompoo and JingJing Yu
- Country of origin: Thailand
- Original language: Thai
- No. of episodes: 11

Production
- Executive producers: Sataporn Panichraksapong; Darapa Choeysanguan
- Producers: Noppharnach Chaiyahwimhon; Bangpahn Homjan; Rabob Pokanngaen
- Production companies: GMMTV; Snap25

Original release
- Network: GMM 25; OneD
- Release: 3 May – 5 July 2026

Related
- Whale Store xoxo; Bake Love Feeling

Enemies with Benefits (Thai: ลัลล์ไม่ชอบไวน์; RTGS: Lan Mai Chop Wai; lit. 'Lal Doesn't Like Wine') is a Thai girl's love television series, starring Ployshompoo Supasap (Jan) and JingJing Yu. Adapted from the novel of the same name by Snow Leopard (เสือดาวหิมะ), it serves as a standalone series in a shared universe with Whale Store xoxo (2025) and the upcoming Thai girl's love television series Bake Love Feeling.

Directed by Tawan Charuchinda alongside Arisa Wawwanjit and produced by GMMTV together with Snap25, the series was announced during the GMMTV 2026: Magic Vibes Maximized event on 25 November 2025.

The series premiered on GMM 25 on 3 May 2026, airing every Sunday at 20:30 ICT, and was made available for streaming on the OneD app at 21:30 ICT. Initially running for 10 episodes, a special episode "Married to My Enemy" was announced at the Enemies With Benefits Final EP. Fan Meeting event on 5 July 2026.

== Synopsis ==
Lal (Ployshompoo Supasap), Head of Sales, always tries to outdo Wine (JingJing Yu), Head of Accounting, who is her complete opposite and known for her cruel attitude. After certain circumstances lead them into a secret "friends with benefits" arrangement, the two must pretend to be enemies to hide the relationship from their colleagues. However, their closeness eventually develops into an unexpected love.

== Cast and characters ==
=== Main ===
- Ployshompoo Supasap (Jan) as Lallalin (Lal)
- JingJing Yu as Vetaka (Wine)

=== Supporting ===
- Ploynira Hiruntaveesin (Kapook) as Tangkwa
- Rutricha Phapakithi (Ciize) as Proud
- Phatchatorn Thanawat (Ployphach) as Numnim
- Chayakorn Jutamas (JJ) as Bas
- Juthapich Indrajundra (Jamie) as Marisa (Medsai)
- Kittipat Chalaragse (Golf) as Jantra
- Niti Chaichitathorn (Pompam) as Phakphoom
- Leo Saussay as New
- Vichuda Pindum (Mam)
- Nanthasai Visalyaputra (Tae) as Korn

=== Guest ===
- Rattanawadee Wongthong (Mim) as Chadcharan (Cheese) (Ep. 2, 8, 10)
- Kullanat Kulpreeyawat (Namfon)
- Benyapa Jeenprasom (View) as Naralak (Noey) (Ep. 10)
- Sillapintr Sillapachai (Sangt) (Ep. 10)

== Original soundtrack ==
The official soundtrack for Enemies with Benefits features:

Song	Artist(s)	Label	Ref.
"งั้นรักละ (Don’t Wanna, but I Do)"	Jan Ployshompoo and JingJing Yu	GMMTV Records	
"Wine I Hate You?"	Jan Ployshompoo and JingJing Yu	GMMTV Records	
"ระยะใกล้รัก (Afraid)"	JingJing Yu	GMMTV Records	
"ฉันผิดเองที่รักเธอ (It’s All My Fault)"	Jan Ployshompoo	GMMTV Records	
"ไม่ชอบเลยที่ชอบเธอ (I Don't Like That I Like You)"	Kapook Ploynira and Ciize Rutricha	GMMTV Records	

== Episodes ==
No.	Title	Directed by	Written by	Original release date
1	"Episode 1"	Tawan Charuchinda; Arisa Wawwanjit	Jinatcha Maneesriwong	May 3, 2026
On her first day at Syntara, sales executive Lal mistakes accounting manager Wine for an intern, getting their relationship off to a rocky start. Lal's attempts to win Wine over fail, and an open rivalry forms between them at the office. A company night out later throws the two together outside of work, and an unplanned encounter leaves them far closer than either expected.
2	"Episode 2"	Tawan Charuchinda; Arisa Wawwanjit	Jinatcha Maneesriwong	May 10, 2026
Unwilling to let their colleagues find out what happened between them, Wine suggests that she and Lal keep seeing each other privately while maintaining the appearance of mutual dislike at work. The pair try to set ground rules for the secret arrangement, but a company bowling outing blurs the line between professional rivalry and growing attraction.
3	"Episode 3"	Tawan Charuchinda; Arisa Wawwanjit	Jinatcha Maneesriwong	May 17, 2026
As Lal and Wine settle into their secret arrangement, a colleague named Proud begins spending increasing time with Wine, drawing close to her and pushing Lal to the margins. Lal is unexpectedly bothered by Proud's presence, complicating the boundaries she and Wine had tried to establish.
4	"Episode 4"	Tawan Charuchinda; Arisa Wawwanjit	Jinatcha Maneesriwong	May 24, 2026
A burst pipe leaves Wine's condo uninhabitable, and Lal offers to let her stay at her place while repairs are carried out. Sharing close quarters for an extended period forces the two to adjust to an unfamiliar domestic routine, testing the boundaries of their secret relationship.
5	"Episode 5"	Tawan Charuchinda; Arisa Wawwanjit	Jinatcha Maneesriwong	May 31, 2026
Lal is caught off guard when Proud directly asks her whether she and Wine are actually dating. Meanwhile, Wine asks colleague Tangkwa to help Proud with a task, a request that surprises Tangkwa given Wine's usual manner toward her.
6	"Episode 6"	Tawan Charuchinda; Arisa Wawwanjit	Jinatcha Maneesriwong	June 7, 2026
A company outing puts Lal and Wine in front of their colleagues, whose teasing speculation about a romance between the two intensifies. Spurred by the moment, Lal admits to Wine that she wants their relationship to be more than a casual arrangement.
7	"Episode 7"	Tawan Charuchinda; Arisa Wawwanjit	Jinatcha Maneesriwong	June 14, 2026
A misunderstanding among the group leaves Tangkwa upset, straining the friendship. Wine, meanwhile, continues to grapple with her growing feelings for Lal as old fears resurface and complicate her ability to move the relationship forward.
8	"Episode 8"	Tawan Charuchinda; Arisa Wawwanjit	Jinatcha Maneesriwong	June 21, 2026
Lal and Wine discover evidence that implicate's Korn's involvement in corrupt practices against company policies. Later, despite a heartfelt confession of their feelings for each other, Wine decides to drop her relationship with Lal after Korn threatens to expose them to HR.
9	"Episode 9"	Tawan Charuchinda; Arisa Wawwanjit	Jinatcha Maneesriwong	June 28, 2026
Lal brings evidence of Korn's corruption to the Vice President, while Korn reports both Lal and Wine of their secret relationship. Wine denies the relationship and voluntarily resigns. During Wine's farewell party, Korn forces a drunk Wine to leave with him to a love hotel. Elsewhere, Lal exposes Medsai as New and Korn's accomplice.
10	"Episode 10"	Tawan Charuchinda; Arisa Wawwanjit	Jinatcha Maneesriwong	July 5, 2026
Korn is arrested, while Lal asks Wine to be her girlfriend. The company offers Wine a position in Japan, which she rejects. Both argued about her decision, but reconciled after brief time apart. Wine goes to Japan for 3 months, and returns to continue her relationship with Lal while working at a subsidiary company.

== Sequel ==
On 5 July 2026, during the screening of the final episode of Enemies with Benefits, a special sequel episode titled Married to My Enemy was announced. The special is expected to premiere in late 2026, although an official release date has not yet been confirmed.

== Production ==
After the series was announced by GMMTV during their GMMTV2026: Magic Vibes Maximized event on 25 November 2025, production for the series began 3 December 2025. Filming for the series began on 9 January 2026, and officially ended on 14 March 2026. The official trailer was revealed on 15 April 2026.

== Fan meetings ==
Year	Title	Date	Venue	Ref.
2026	Enemies with Benefits: Fight at First Sight	May 3, 2026	6th Fl. Siam Paragon - Siam Pavalai, Paragon Cineplex	
2026	Enemies With Benefits Final EP. Fan Meeting	July 5, 2026	MCC Hall fl. 3, The Mall Lifestore Bangkapi	
2026	Enemies with Benefits Fan Meeting in Macau	July 25, 2026	Fisherman's Wharf Convention and Exhibition Center	
2026	Enemies with Benefits Fan Meeting in Taipei	September 6, 2026	Zepp New Taipei, Honhui Plaza	
2026	GMMTV FanDay 35: Enemies with Benefits	September 26, 2026	Nguyen Du Gymnasium, Ho Chi Minh City	
2026	Enemies with Benefits Fan Meeting in Seoul	October 11, 2026	Coex Artium, Seoul	
2026	Enemies with Benefits Fan Meeting in Singapore	December 5, 2026	D’Marquee, Downtown East	
2026	Enemies with Benefits Fan Meeting in Hong Kong	December 12, 2026	MacPherson Stadium, Hong Kong	
2027	Enemies with Benefits Fan Meeting in Manila	January 9, 2027	The Crossroad Center, Quezon City	

== Awards and nominations ==
Award nominations for Enemies with Benefits
Year	Award	Category	Nominee(s)	Result	Ref.
2026	Mint Awards 2026	Breakthrough Cast of the Year	Enemies with Benefits	Won	
2026	Feed x Khaosod Awards 2026	Girls' Love Actress of the Year	JingJing Yu	Nominated	
2026	Feed x Khaosod Awards 2026	Top-Tier GL Series of the Year	Enemies with Benefits	Nominated	
