= JingJing Yu =

Thai actress, model and singer (born 1997)

- จิงจิง ยู
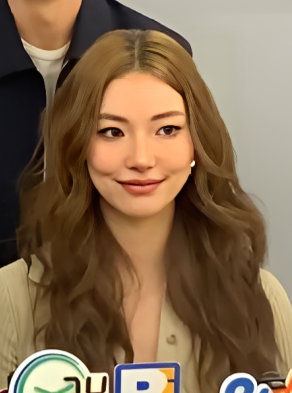
- Yu in June 2025
- Born: Varitsara Yu (วริศรา ยู); 1 April 1997 (age 29); Bangkok, Thailand
- Education: Assumption University of Thailand
- Occupations: Actress; Model; Singer
- Years active: 2012–present
- Agents: Kiss Models Bangkok (2012–2017); ESteem Entertainment (2017–2020); QOW Entertainment (2022–2023); GMMTV (2024–present)
- Known for: June in App War; Mahnmook in Whale Store xoxo; Picha in Hide & Sis; Wine in Enemies With Benefits

Prariyapit Yu (Thai: ปริยพิชญ์ ยู; born 1 April 1997), formerly Varitsara Yu (Thai: วริศรา ยู), known professionally as JingJing Yu (Thai: จิงจิง ยู), is a Thai-Chinese actress, model and singer. She is a former member of the girl group 2021 Ratri under White Fox. She initially gained recognition when she became the first foreign model to sign with South Korean model agency ESteem Entertainment in 2017. She later made her film debut in the 2018 drama movie App War for which she won the 15th Kom Chad Luek Awards for Best Actress, as well as a nomination for the 28th Suphannahong National Film Awards in 2019.

After she signed with GMMTV in 2024, she gained further recognition for her performances throughout 2025 in various television series, including Hide & Sis and Enigma Black Stage. She is also known for her sapphic roles in Whale Store xoxo (2025), MuTeLuv: Hello, Is This Luck? (2025) and Enemies with Benefits (2026).

== Early and personal life ==
Yu was born as Varitsara Yu in Bangkok, Thailand, to a Chinese father and a Thai mother. She is of Thai Chinese descent. She is the middle child of three, with an older sister, Junjun (Thai: จันจัน), and a younger sister, Junejune (Thai: จูนจูน). Yu attended high school at Srivikorn School, and later studied communication arts at Assumption University of Thailand before she dropped out to pursue her modelling career. In June 2022, Yu and Ratanadaros Umpujh (Ittirit) publicly confirmed their relationship.

== Career ==
Yu entered the entertainment industry at age 15 after winning the Thai Supermodel Contest 2012 and subsequently signed a contract with Kiss Models Bangkok. In the meantime, she appeared in various music videos, most notably in Labanoon's "แพ้ทาง" and in The Rube's "I'm Sorry" where she played as Sita, a striking Thai traditional dancer. She said she accepted the offer of Sita as it was a job where she got to dance, the thing she used to do before becoming a model. When she was 19, she got the opportunity to do a photoshoot in South Korea after a friend of a friend of hers recommended her to the stylists. She later signed with South Korean model agency ESteem Entertainment, marking the first foreign model to sign with the agency. In her first runway season, she walked fashion runway shows for Fleamadonna, Supercomma B, Abell, JWL, PushBUTTON, Low Classic, Kye Noke and Ych at the 2018 Seoul Fashion Week. She then did photoshoots for various Korean magazines and commercials for many brands, including two big Korean brands 8seconds and Nona9on, along with Lisa.

In the same year, Yu made her film debut in the movie App War (2018) as June, a determined young tech entrepreneur caught between her ruthless drive to win a high-stakes start-up competition and her romantic chemistry with her rival Bom (Nat Kitcharit). She received critical praise for her performance, winning the 15th Kom Chad Luek Awards for Best Actress, as well as a nomination for the 28th Suphannahong National Film Awards.

In 2020, Yu's contract with ESteem Entertainment ended amid the COVID-19 pandemic, though the contract was supposed to expire in 2025. In the next year, she debuted as a member of 2021 Ratri, a revived version of 2002 Ratri, alongside Milli, Gam, Blossom, and Waii, with the release of their single "จีนี่ จ๋า (2021)", a rearranged version of 2002 Ratri's single of the same name. After the release of "ที่สุดของฉัน" in the same year, the group presumably disbanded.

In October 2022, she signed with QOW Entertainment, an entertainment company and talent agency owned by the then-couple Kanyawee Songmuang (Thanaerng) and Krissanapoom Pibulsonggram (JJ). Yu and Songmuang have been close friends, along with Maylada Susri (Bow), since they participated the Thai Supermodel contest. She said that she chose the agency because she had only one manager throughout her career until her manager passed away, so she wanted to find someone who shared her perspective and loved her like a daughter, and she found the agency to be a perfect fit. However, she concluded her contract with the agency a year later in November 2023.

In early 2024, she signed a contract with GMMTV. Although she signed with the new agency, she fulfilled her previous commitment by playing a lead role of Yok Suricha in Channel 3's lakorn Naka De Salon (2024). She also starred in Win Metawin's music video for "ดึกมากแล้ว (NIGHT RIDE)".

In 2025, she went on to play various roles in several television series, including as Picha, one of the Bupphachinda sisters in Hide & Sis, and as Jew, an acclaimed dancer in Enigma Black Stage. She also gained wider recognition for her sapphic roles in Whale Store xoxo, where she played as Mahnmook, Wan's (Pansa Vosbein) ex-girlfriend, and MuTeLuv: Hello, Is This Luck?, where she played as Leemhai, alongside Ployshompoo Supasap (Jan). Her partnership with Supasap continues with Enemies with Benefits and the upcoming drama Bake Love Feeling, which are set to air in 2026.

== Filmography ==
Key
†	Denotes films that have not yet been released

=== Film ===
Year	Title	Role	Notes	Ref.
2018	Please This Year	Lin	Short film for "ขอเถอะปีนี้" by Somkiat	
2018	App War	June	Main role	

=== Television series ===
Year	Title	Role	Network	Notes	Ref.
2019	Sleepless Society: Insomnia	Mo	One31	Main role	
2024	Naka De Salon	Yok Suricha	Channel 3	Main role	
2025	Ossan's Love Thailand	Rose	GMM25	Guest role	
2025	Break Up Service	Rose	GMM25	Supporting role	
2025	Whale Store xoxo	Mahnmook Manatsanan	GMM25	Supporting role	
2025	Hide & Sis	"Picha" Putpichaya Bupphachinda	GMM25	Main role	
2025	Enigma Black Stage	"Jew" Jinjanya Jiaramani	One31	Supporting role	
2025	MuTeLuv: Hello, Is This Luck?	Leemhai	GMM25	Main role	
2026	Enemies with Benefits	"Wine" Vetaka	GMM25	Main role	
2026	Oxytoxin	Padcha	GMM25	Supporting role	
TBA	Bake Love Feeling †	"Wine" Vetaka	TBA	Supporting role	
TBA	My Beautiful Enemy †	Yara	TBA	Main role	

=== Television show ===
Year	Title	Network	Notes	Ref.
2022	Oh, Teacher Khong	Workpoint TV	Khaohom (Guest, Ep. 215)	
2025	Goodbye My Luck	Workpoint TV	Guest (Ep. 51)	
2026	The Face Men Thailand season 4	Netflix	Off's guest mentor (Ep. 2)	

=== Music video appearances ===
Year	Title	Artist	Ref.
2015	"คู่ชีวิต"	Cocktail	
2016	"แพ้ทาง"	Labanoon	
2016	"I'm Sorry (สีดา)"	The Rube	
2016	"Fin (วันทอง)"	The Rube feat. Mildvocalist	
2017	"Foe (ไม่ใช่พระเอก)"	The Rube feat. Leew Ajareeya	
2017	"Fail (ขันหมากล่ม)"	The Rube	
2018	"ขอเถอะปีนี้"	Somkiat	
2018	"มีผลต่อหัวใจ"	Nont Tanont	
2021	"หาย (Ship High)"	Pok	
2021	"แค่อยากพูดคำว่ารัก"	NiceCNX feat. Ferri	
2022	"พิเศษจะตาย (One of a Kind)"	Ice Paris	
2022	"แอบรัก"	C Siwat feat. T Goff	
2023	"พี่มันเลว สีดา๒"	The Rube feat. Seeda Thevillain	
2023	"เทพลีลา"	Silly Fools	
2024	"ดึกมากแล้ว (Night Ride)"	Win Metawin feat. Badmixy	
2026	"ดื้อ (Cheeky)"	Le7el	
2026	"ปล่อยใจ (Bloom)"	Tui Chayatorn	

== Discography ==
=== Singles ===
==== Digital singles ====
Year	Title	Label	Notes	Ref.
2021	"จีนี่ จ๋า (2021)" with 2021 Ratri	White Fox	Rearranged version of 2002 Ratri's single of the same name	
2021	"ที่สุดของฉัน" with 2021 Ratri	White Fox	2021 Ratri 2nd digital single	

===== Collaborations =====
Year	Title	Label	Ref.
2026	"Don't Come Down" with Jan Ployshompoo	GMMTV Records	

===== Soundtrack appearances =====
Year	Title	Soundtrack	Label	Ref.
2026	"งั้นรักละ (Don’t Wanna, but I Do)" with Jan Ployshompoo	Enemies with Benefits OST	GMMTV Records	
2026	"Wine I Hate You?" with Jan Ployshompoo	Enemies with Benefits OST	GMMTV Records	
2026	"ระยะใกล้รัก (Afraid)"	Enemies with Benefits OST	GMMTV Records	

== Fan meetings ==
Title	Date	Venue	Notes	Ref.
Whale Store xoxo Final Ep. Fan Meeting	27 August 2025	6th Fl. Siam Pavalai Theatre, Paragon Cineplex	With Whale Store xoxo Cast	
Enemies with Benefits: Fight at First Sight	3 May 2026	6th Fl. Siam Pavalai Theatre, Paragon Cineplex	With Enemies with Benefits Cast	
Enemies with Benefits Final Ep. Fan Meeting	5 July 2026	MCC Hall 3rd Fl. The Mall Lifestore Bangkapi	With Enemies with Benefits Cast	
Enemies with Benefits Fan Meeting in Macau	25 July 2026	Fisherman's Wharf Convention and Exhibition Center	With Enemies with Benefits Cast	
GMMTV International Novel Festival 2026	31 July 2026	Samyan Mitrtown, 5th Fl.	With Jan	
Starry Veils Drift Softly, Meet JingJing	23 August 2026	China	—N/a	
Enemies with Benefits Fan Meeting in Taipei	6 September 2026	Zepp New Taipei	With Enemies with Benefits Cast	
GMMTV FanDay 35: Enemies with Benefits	26 September 2026	Nguyen Du Gymnasium, Ho Chi Minh City	With Enemies with Benefits Cast	
GMMTV FanDay 36 in Tokyo	2 October 2026	New Pier Hall	With Jan	
GMMTV FanDay 37 in Paris	4 October 2026	Novotel Paris Est Centre de Conference	With Jan	
GMMTV Fanival: Happy Family	7 October 2026	Union Hall, Union Mall	With Jan	
Enemies with Benefits Fan Meeting in Seoul	11 October 2026	Coex Artium	With Enemies with Benefits Cast	
Enemies with Benefits Fan Meeting in Singapore	5 December 2026	D’Marquee, Downtown East	With Enemies with Benefits Cast	
Enemies with Benefits Fan Meeting in Hong Kong	12 December 2026	MacPherson Stadium	With Enemies with Benefits Cast	
Enemies with Benefits Fan Meeting in Manila	9 January 2027	The Crossroad Center, Quezon City	With Enemies with Benefits Cast	

== Concerts ==
Title	Date	Venue	Notes	Ref.
Blush Blossom Fan Fest: Midnight Bloom	13–14 June 2026	BITEC Live	With Jan, Milk, Love, Namtan, Film, Emi, Bonnie, View, Mim, June, Mewnich, Pahn, Fond, Kapook, Ciize	
Nineentertain 24th Anniversary Charity Concert	30 September 2026	Parc Paragon, Siam Paragon	With Jan, Krist, Almond, Progress, Felizz, Clo'ver	
Blush Blossom Fan Fest: Midnight Bloom in Macau	24 October 2026	Fisherman's Wharf Convention & Exhibition Center	With Jan, Milk, Love, Namtan, Film, Emi, Bonnie, View, Mim, Pahn, Fond, Kapook, Ciize	
Blush Blossom Fan Fest: Midnight Bloom in Kaohsiung	7 November 2026	Kaohsiung Music Center	With Jan, Milk, Love, Namtan, Film, Emi, Bonnie, View, Mim, Pahn, Fond, Kapook, Ciize	
JanJingJing Bewitch You Fancon	21–22 November 2026	Thunder Dome, Muang Thong Thani	With Jan	
PEBACA Legacy Fam Concert	30–31 January 2027	BITEC Live	With Krist, Singto, Off, Gun, Tay, New, Nanon, Namtan, Gawin, Nani, Prem, Sky, Bonnie, Phuwin	

== Awards and nominations ==
Award nominations for JingJing Yu
Year	Award	Category	Nominee(s)	Result	Ref.
2019	28th Suphannahong National Film Awards	Best Leading Actress	App War	Nominated	
2019	15th Kom Chad Luek Awards	Best Leading Actress	App War	Won	
2019	27th Bangkok Critics Assembly Awards	Best Leading Actress	App War	Nominated	
2019	9th Thai Film Director Awards	Best Leading Actress	App War	Nominated	
2026	Feed x Khaosod Awards 2026	Girls' Love Actress of the Year	Enemies with Benefits	Nominated	
2026	31st Asian Television Awards	Best Actress in a Supporting Role	Enigma Black Stage	Nominated	
