= Oxytoxin (TV series) =

2026–27 Thai television series

- Official series poster
- Thai: จุนใจไอดาว
- Genre: Romance; Drama
- Created by: Grit Jirakiertivadhana
- Screenplay by: Patha Thongpan; Thanaporn Phetcharas; Jarinee Thanomyat
- Directed by: Patha Thongpan
- Starring: Chanitsiri Ratananimit; Nonthakarn Kaewobchoey; Yosita Wasuphiruk; Sabsima Payakharn; Jittanan Sirisamrit
- Opening theme: "RIP (to the Boys)" by Zorro and Gamma Skies
- Ending theme: "หลง (Lost in Dreams)" by Fond Natticha
- Country of origin: Thailand
- Original language: Thai
- No. of episodes: 10

Production
- Executive producers: Sataporn Panichraksapong; Darapa Choeysanguan; Kamthorn Lorjitramnuay; Puchong Tuntisungwaragul
- Producers: Supaporn Lertthitiverakarn; Nuttapong Mongkolsawas
- Running time: 50–54 minutes
- Production companies: GMMTV; Parbdee Taweesuk

Original release
- Network: GMM 25; Netflix
- Release: 7 November 2026 – present

Oxytoxin (Thai: จุนใจไอดาว; RTGS: Chunchai Aidao; lit. 'Junjai Aidao') is a 2026 Thai girls' love series starring Chanitsiri Ratananimit (Waifha), Nonthakarn Kaewobchoey (Tonkhaw), Yosita Wasuphiruk (Yogurt), Sabsima Payakharn (Pang) and Jittanan Sirisamrit (Benz).

Directed by Patha Thongpan and produced by GMMTV together with Parbdee Taweesuk, the series was announced at the GMMTV Magic Vibes Maximized event on 25 November 2025.

The series premiered on GMM 25 and Netflix on 7 November 2026, airing on Saturdays at 21:30 ICT.

== Synopsis ==
At Saint Cecilia's, an all-girls school, rules and order are paramount, except for "Toxxxxin", the school's resident student gang. Led by Aidao (Nonthakarn Kaewobchoey), the daughter of an influential politician, along with Gale (Jittanan Sirisamrit), Chelsea (Yosita Wasuphiruk), and Meimei (Sabsima Payakharn), who are widely known across the school.

The turning point begins when Aidao meets Junjai (Chanitsiri Ratananimit), a scholarship student who has been bullied to the edge but looks exactly like Aidao's dream girl. Aidao pulls Junjai into their group, transforming her from a victim into a new queen, helping her pursue her dreams of becoming a model and designer. But reality isn't as rosy as their dreams. The girls face formidable challenges, including the political games of the adults, the dark powers of their families, and social pressures ready to destroy them all with the flick of a wrist.

== Cast and characters ==
=== Main ===
- Chanitsiri Ratananimit (Waifha) as Junjai Janyakul
- Nonthakarn Kaewobchoey (Tonkhaw) as Aidao Laosathitphong
- Yosita Wasuphiruk (Yogurt) as Sasi Kinghathai (Chelsea)
- Sabsima Payakharn (Pang) as Heman Wiriyanapha (Meimei)
- Jittanan Sirisamrit (Benz) as Klaorin Wongrak (Gale)

=== Supporting ===
- Prariyapit Yu (JingJing) as Padcha
- Krongkwan Nakornthap (Jaoying) as Ploypim Chaiotrakhul
- Save Saisawat as Dim Laosathitphong
- Polpat Asavaprapha (Moo) as Jessada Wei (Jes)
- Rasee Wacharapolmek (Organ)
- Phollawat Manuprasert (Tom) as Sathit Laosathitphong
- Samantha Melanie Coates
- Ratapirom Bandapraneat (Michiru) as A

=== Guest ===
- Janie Tienphosuwan

== Episodes ==
| No. | Title | Original release date |
|---|---|---|
| 1 | "Blind Fold" | 7 November 2026 |
After rescuing Junjai from drowning in a pool, the girls of "Toxxxxin" invite her to join their ranks in the most popular clique in their high school.
| 2 | "Kiss Mark" | 14 November 2026 |
Aidao helps Junjai adjust to "Toxxxxxin", but Gale's reluctant approval and a looming school competition makes the newcomer question her place in the group.
| 3 | "Lock Pick" | 21 November 2026 |
Junjai gets a modelling offer, but the school forbids her from accepting it, so "Toxxxxxin" negotiates with someone they hate — the student body president.

== Original soundtrack ==
The official soundtrack for Oxytoxin features:

| Song | Artist(s) | Label | Ref. |
|---|---|---|---|
| "หลง (Lost in Dreams)" | Fond Natticha | GMMTV Records | |

== Fan meetings ==
| Year | Title | Date | Venue | Ref. |
|---|---|---|---|---|
| 2026 | Oxytoxin: Love to Meet You | 7 November 2026 | SF World Cinema, CentralWorld | |
