= Love Sick (2024 Thai TV series) =

2024 Thai television series

- Thai: ชุลมุนกางเกงน้ำเงิน
- Literally: Love Sick
- Genre: Romantic drama; Boys' love; Romantic comedy
- Directed by: Cheewin Thanamin Wongskulphat
- Starring: Poomsuwan Suwansatit; Passawish Thamasungkeeti; Krit Ngamtanakijja; Pongphop Samranchaiyakorn; Thayawat Sereeviriyakun; Deeprompt Soontornsittisopa; Thanatpong Thaveesapmanee; Phasith Aroonratanakul; Vachirawit Ouitayakul; Busaya Wanna; Purichaya Saranark
- Country of origin: Thailand
- Original language: Thai
- No. of episodes: 15

Production
- Editor: Theerasan Petmai
- Running time: 60 minutes
- Production company: Tia51

Original release
- Network: Channel 9 MCOT HD; WeTV; iQIYI
- Release: 14 September – 22 December 2024

Love Sick (Thai: ชุลมุนกางเกงน้ำเงิน) is a 2024 Thai television series in the romantic drama, romantic comedy and boys' love (BL) genres, directed by Thanamin Wongskulphat (Cheewin) and produced by Tia51. The series is a remake of the 2014 version, based on the original work by Kwang Latika Chumpoo.

The series aired from 14 September to 22 December 2024, with weekly episodes on Sundays on Channel 9 MCOT HD. It was also made available on WeTV and iQIYI.

== Synopsis ==
Pun (Poomsuwan Suwansatit) has a girlfriend, but his father wants him to date his business partner's daughter. Pang, Pun's younger sister, is obsessed with boys' love. To convince his father to accept his relationship with his friend's daughter, Pun asks No (Passawish Thamasungkeeti) to pretend to be his boyfriend. In return, Pun helps No raise funds for the school's music club.

What starts as a fake relationship gradually becomes real, and the two must deal with confused feelings and the pressure of maintaining the charade.

== Cast and characters ==
=== Main ===
- Poomsuwan Suwansatit (Almond) as Pun
- Passawish Thamasungkeeti (Progress) as No

=== Supporting ===
- Krit Ngamtanakijja (Krit) as Earn
- Pongphop Samranchaiyakorn (Phop) as Pete
- Thayawat Sereeviriyakun (Toto) as Mick
- Deeprompt Soontornsittisopa (NJ) as Ohm
- Thanatpong Thaveesapmanee (Shane) as Per
- Phasith Aroonratanakul (Sky) as Mawin
- Vachirawit Ouitayakul (Volk) as Fi (Ohm's friend)
- Busaya Wanna (Bew) as Aim (Pun's girlfriend)
- Purichaya Saranark (Yeepun) as Yuri
- Todsawat Loylertrit (Tac) as Khom (No's friend)
- Phurinat Panprommin (Copter) as Keng (No's friend)
- Chirapatch Vitookijwattana (Earth) as Ken (No's friend)
- Sirapope Jutaroj (Pheem) as Dong (No's friend)
- Khetsophon Sophonmanee (Pooh) as Rotkeng (No's friend)
- Veeraphat Youngyuenskuldej (Peak) as Phong (No's friend)
- Pichitchai Limpakuptathaworn (Pao) as Palm (No's friend)
- Ditheechok Wongbunditjaroen (Chok) as Not (music club member)
- Theechula Wontanawaigoon (Thee) as Phum (music club member)
- Kwanbhumi Sermsirimongkol (Dedee) as Film (music club member)
- Pattarakit Thangmongkholkitchakan (Ben) as Ngor (music club member)
- Chawanwit Phongphan (VJ) as Pao (music club member)
- Komtaat Pichetpaisarn (Fair) as Art (music club member)
- Tobias Vandepitte (Toby) as Ben (music club member)
- Nuttaon Usavaprasertdee (Ice) as Li
- Sirawas Tanatatsupaset (Asia) as Ton (No's friend)

=== Guest ===
- Apivich Rinthapoln (Jade) as Nan (Pun's family servant) (Ep. 1)
- Jennie Panhan as Im (Ep. 2)
- Ninew Phetdankaeo as Ann (Ep. 2)
- Pympan Chalayanacupt (Pym) as Aim's mother (Ep. 2)
- Chanagun Arpornsutinan (Gunsmile) as drum vendor (Ep. 4, uncredited)
- Peerada Namwong (Paper) as Grace (Ep. 5, uncredited)
- Tinnakorn Puwasakdiwong (Tontae) as sports day emcee (Ep. 5)
- Pannin Charnmanoon (Pineare) as Plai (open house MC) (Ep. 10, uncredited)
- Primrose Chindavanich (Prim) as Theeros (open house MC) (Ep. 10, uncredited)
- Manatsanan Wanichsataporn (Tammy) as Nan
- Supoj Janjareonborn (Lift) as Pun's father
- Dhanyabhorn Sondhikandha (Joy) as Pun's mother
- Nantawat Palakawongsna Ayudhya (Earth) as Mawin's father

== Production ==
The series was announced as a remake of the 2014 version, produced by Tia51. The director was Thanamin Wongskulphat (Cheewin), known for other works in the BL genre.

The official pilot was released before the premiere to build anticipation.

In June 2024, a launch event for the music video of the song "สั่น" (Shake), the series' soundtrack, was held with the cast in attendance. A blessing ceremony also took place before filming began.

== Release ==
The series premiered on 14 September 2024 on Channel 9 MCOT HD, airing weekly on Sundays at 11:00 p.m. (local time). The uncut version was made available on WeTV and iQIYI.

The final episode aired on 22 December 2024.

== Awards and nominations ==
Year	Award	Category	Work	Result	Ref.
2025	Thailand Viral Hits Awards	Most Popular Boys' Love Series of the Year	Love Sick 2024	Won	
2025	Thailand Box Office Awards	Rookie of the Year	Almond Poomsuwan Suwansatit and Progress Passawish Thamasungkeeti	Won	
