= Warinrat Yolprasong =

Thai singer (born 2005)

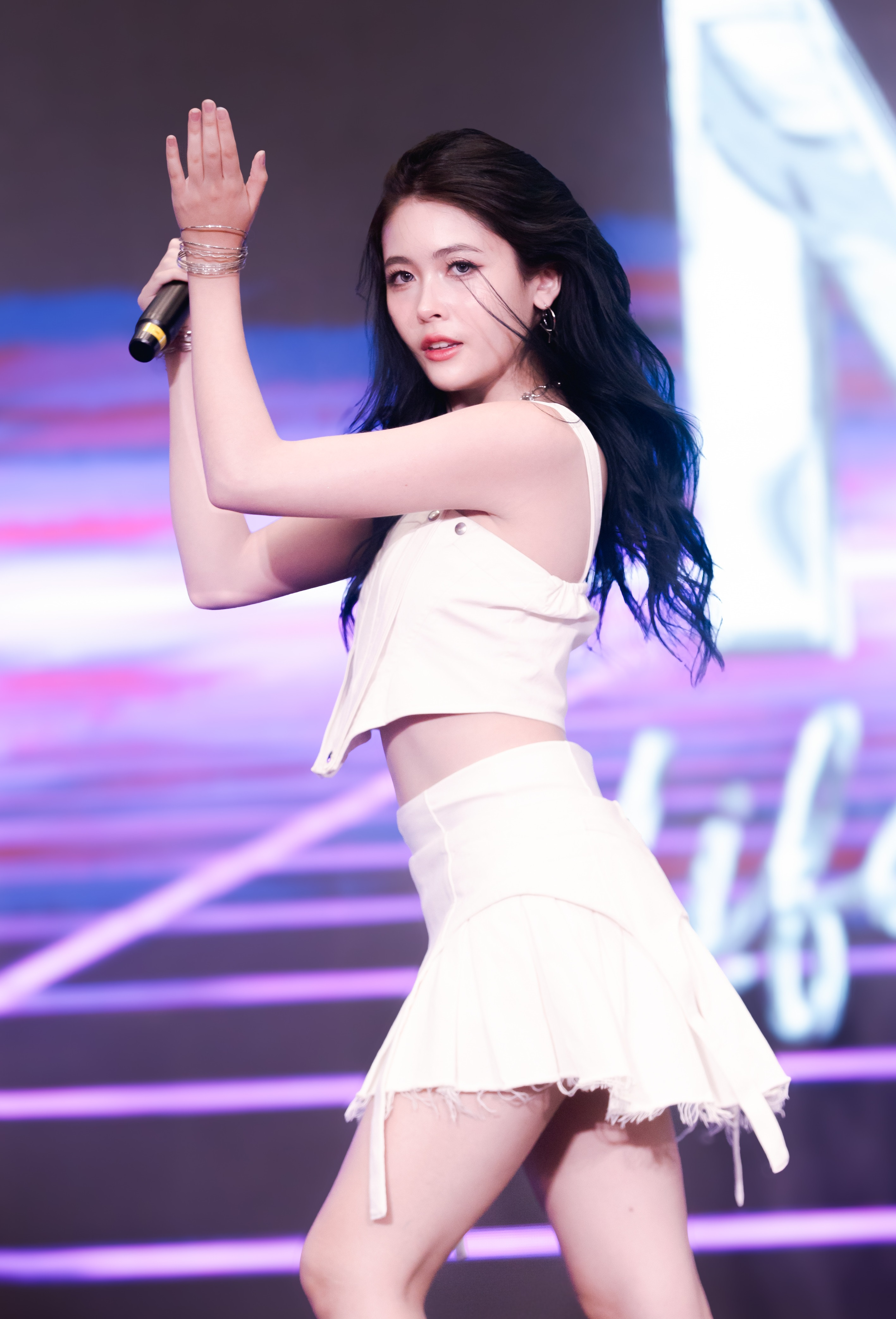
- Niky in 2023

Background information
- Also known as: Niky, Niky Warinrat, Niky BNK48, Niky QRRA
- Born: January 26, 2005 (age 21); Udon Thani, Thailand
- Genres: T-pop; J-pop
- Occupations: Idol; Singer; Actress
- Years active: 2018–Present
- Labels: BNK48 Office (2018–2019) iAM (2019–2025); FRT Entertainment (2025–Present)
- Formerly of: BNK48; QRRA

Warinrat Yolprasong (born January 26, 2005) nickname Niky (Dutch name Neera Schut) is a Thai-Dutch idol. She is a former member of a member of the Thai idol girl group BNK48, 2nd generation and also part of BNK48's Team BIII. She was also a member of BNK48's sub-unit QRRA.

== Early life ==
Niky was born in Udon Thani, Thailand, to a Thai mother and a Dutch father born in the Netherlands. Niky and her family moved to Chiang Mai when she was 9 years old. She attended Regina Coeli College for her primary and elementary education. Niky later moved to Bangkok and attended Udomsuksa School for elementary and high school until the 9th grade, when she decided to drop out and take the General Educational Development (GED) test to enter university at the age of 17. She is currently pursuing a degree in Broadcast Journalism at Bangkok University.

Niky identifies as bisexual.

== Career ==
Niky joined BNK48 in 2018 as part of the 2nd generation trainees. She was first introduced to the public at Bangkok Comic Con x Thailand Comic Con on April 29, 2018. On July 17, 2018, Niky made her debut and performed as a BNK48 member for the first time during "BNK48 2nd Generation: The Debut." She was also selected to be a senbatsu member for the 2nd generation's song "Tsugi no Season”

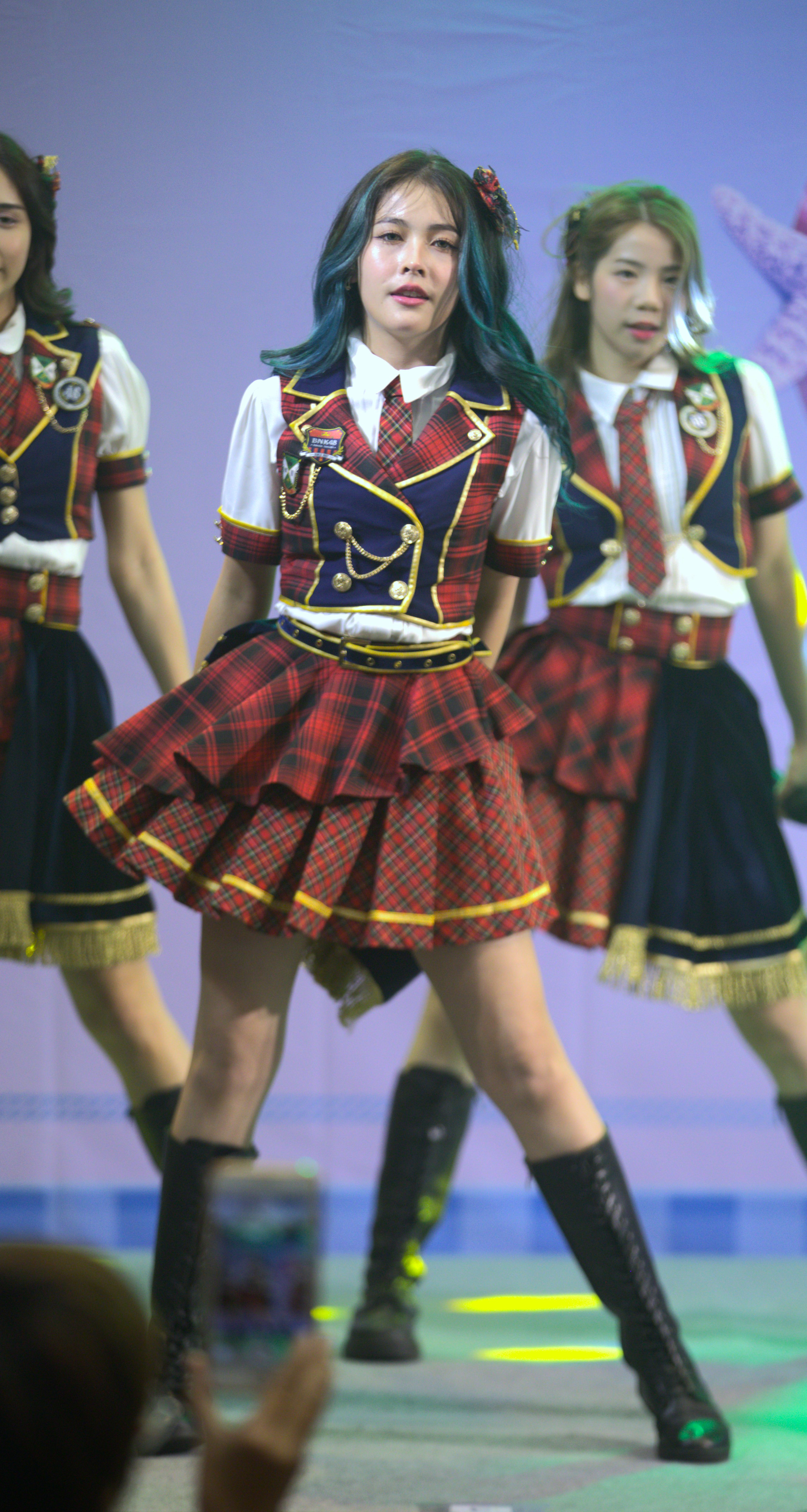
Niky BNK48 at Roadshow in Rayong on 21 October 2023

Niky participated in the senbatsu singing audition for “Mata Anata no Koto wo Kangaeteta'” on October 29, 2018. She successfully passed the audition and was selected as a senbatsu member for this song. In 2019, Niky became the senbatsu member of an BNK48 title track for the first time in the 7th single "77 no Suteki na Machi e" (Thai: 77 ดินแดนแสนวิเศษ) During the same year, Niky joined BNK48 Team BIII and was part of the 'Gomen ne Jewel' unit in BNK48 Team BIII's 2nd Stage.

On December 7, 2019, at the BNK48 7th Single "77 ดินแดนแสนวิเศษ" Handshake event, Niky was announced to have passed the audition and was selected to join the BNK48 x Universal Music Group Special Unit. This project was a collaboration between Independent Artist Management and Universal Music Thailand, along with 5 members from BNK48, Noey, Pun, Jennis, and New. They were scheduled to travel to Los Angeles, USA, for professional training in singing, dancing, and acting. However, due to the COVID-19 pandemic, all plans were postponed, and they began training in Thailand for one month instead. During this period, they introduced their group name as "LYRA" to the public. On October 7, 2020, LYRA officially made their debut during the "LYRA Debut Stage" at Emquartier Gallery, M floor, EmQuartier shopping mall.

In 2020, in BNK48 9th Single Senbatsu General Election, Niky achieved her first ranking, securing the 38th place with 2,305 votes. This earned her a spot in the 'Next Girls' group, which performed the song "Wink wa 3 Kai" in the single "Heavy Rotation." At the BNK48 12th Single Senbatsu General Election in 2021, Niky ranked in 36th place, with 5,074.41 votes (tokens), becoming part of Next Girls which performed the song "Kinou Yori Motto Suki" in the single "Believers"

On September 17, 2023, at the BNK48 4th Album "Gingham Check" 2-Shot Event, Niky was announced to have joined the senbatsu members of BNK48's 15th coupling song, “Must Be Now,” due to her high scores in dancing during the internal test.

== Discography ==
=== BNK48 ===
| Year | Title | Single | Album | Position | Ref. |
|---|---|---|---|---|---|
| 2018 | Tsugi no Season | Kimi wa Melody | Jabaja | | |
| 2018 | Mata Anata no Koto wo Kangaeteta | BNK Festival | Jabaja | | |
| 2019 | 77 no Suteki na Machi e | 77 no Suteki na Machi e | Warota People | Senbatsu | |
| 2020 | Wink wa 3 Kai | Heavy Rotation | Warota People | | |
| 2021 | Only today – Acapella Version | D.AAA | Gingham Check | | |
| 2022 | Hoshizora wo Kimi Ni | Sayonara crawl | Gingham Check | | |
| 2022 | Kinou Yori Motto Suki | Believers | Gingham Check | | |
| 2023 | Must Be Now | Kibouteki Refrain | | | |

=== LYRA/VYRA/QRRA ===
| Year | Title | Single | Album | Group | Ref. |
|---|---|---|---|---|---|
| 2020 | LYRA | | LYRA The 1st EP | LYRA | |
| 2020 | Vanilla | | LYRA The 1st EP | LYRA | |
| 2020 | เมโลดี้..ที่คิดถึง (Our Memory) | | | LYRA | |
| 2021 | ต๊ะต่อนยอน...Hurry Up! (feat. Sunnee) | ต๊ะต่อนยอน...Hurry Up! | | VYRA | |
| 2023 | Miracle | Miracle | | QRRA | |
| 2024 | Happy We Day | Happy We Day | | QRRA | |
| 2024 | Enough | Enough | | QRRA | |
| 2024 | After Flirt | After Flirt | | QRRA | |
| 2025 | CAKE ROULETTE | CAKE ROULETTE | | QRRA | |
| 2025 | Midnight Text | Midnight Text | | QRRA | |

== Filmography ==
=== Film ===
| Year | Title | Role | Notes | Ref. |
|---|---|---|---|---|
| 2020 | BNK48: One Take | Herself | Sequel documentary of BNK48: Girls Don't Cry | |

=== Television ===
| Year | Title | Role | Notes | Ref. |
|---|---|---|---|---|
| 2026 | Shades | Belle | GL series produced by FRT Entertainment | |

=== Advertisement ===
| Year | Brand | Notes | Ref. |
|---|---|---|---|
| 2019 | Atmos | With BNK48 members | |
| 2025 | EleX by EGAT | EV charging station by Electricity Generating Authority of Thailand | |

== Acting coach credits ==
=== Music video ===
| Year | Title | Notes | Ref. |
|---|---|---|---|
| 2024 | Dare no Koto wo Ichiban Aishiteru? | | |
| 2024 | Kurumi to Dialogue | | |

== Concerts ==
| Year | Date | Concert | Venue | Notes |
|---|---|---|---|---|
| 2018 | 15 September | BNK48 1st 2gether Concert | CentralWorld Square | Free concert from BNK48 1st and 2nd generation. |
| 2019 | 26 January | BNK48 Space Mission Concert | IMPACT Arena | The concert before BNK48 6th Single Senbatsu General Election, which was also held on Niky's birthday. |
| 2019 | 23 March | The Return of BBB # 11 Dream Journey Restage | IMPACT Arena | As a guest. |
| 2019 | 24 August | AKB48 Group Asia Festival 2019 in Shanghai | National Exhibition and Convention Center | 48 Group concert (with AKB48 / JKT48 / BNK48 / MNL48 / AKB48 Team SH / AKB48 Team TP / SGO48). Niky played keyboard in BNK48's special band show. |
| 2019 | 2 November | BNK48 2nd Generation Concert "Blooming Season" | BITEC HALL 106 | BNK48 2nd generation first concert. |
| 2022 | 30 October | BNK48 & CGM48 Request Hour 2022 | Union Hall, 6F Union Mall | First Request Hour concert in Thailand. |
| 2023 | 4 November | AKB48 Group CIRCLE JAM | centralwOrld LIVE | 48 Group concert (AKB48 / BNK48 / CGM48 and more) |
| 2023 | 6 August | BNK48 vs CGM48 Concert "The Battle of Idols" | Union Hall, 6F Union Mall | BNK48 and CGM48 concert. |
| 2023 | 28 October | i-Riginal Live 2023 | Thunder Dome, Muang Thong Thani | First Independent Records concert, where Niky performed as QRRA. |
| 2023 | 29 October | Depart' Cher Cherprang BNK48's Graduation Concert | Thunder Dome, Muang Thong Thani | Cherprang's graduation concert. |
| 2024 | 28 April | Last Season | Centerpoint Studio | BNK48 2nd generation's graduation concert. |
