= Ployshompoo Supasap =

Thai actress and singer (born 1995)

- พลอยชมพู ศุภทรัพย์
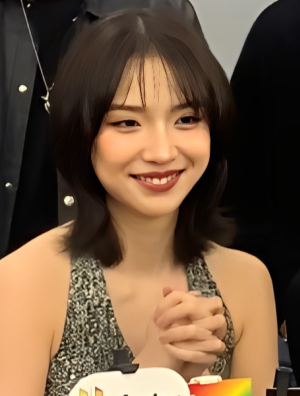
- Ployshompoo in June 2025
- Born: January 5, 1995 (age 31); Bangkok, Thailand
- Other names: Jan (แจน), Janhae (แจนเฮ)
- Education: Thammasat University
- Occupations: Actress; Singer; Model
- Years active: 2014–present
- Agent: GMMTV
- Known for: Tida in Who Are You; Meen in P.S. I Hate You; Pai in Cherry Magic; Lal in Enemies With Benefits
- Musical career
- Genre: T-pop
- Instrument: Vocals
- Labels: GMMTV Records; Riser Music
- Formerly of: Sizzy
- Website: gmm-tv.com

Ployshompoo Supasap (Thai: พลอยชมพู ศุภทรัพย์; born 5 January 1995), nicknamed Jan (Thai: แจน), is a Thai actress, singer and model. She is a former member of the girl group Sizzy under Riser Music. She first gained recognition for her performances in various television series, notably portraying Praepailin in SOTUS (2016) and Sun in YOUniverse (2018). For playing Tida in the 2020 teen mystery series Who Are You, she won the Zoom Dara Awards for Best Actress in a Villain Role, as well as a nomination for the 25th Asian Television Award for Best Actress in a Supporting Role in 2020.

She gained further recognition for her performances in various television series, including P.S. I Hate You (2022), Cherry Magic (2023) and Hide & Sis (2025). She is also known for her sapphic roles in MuTeLuv: Hello, Is This Luck? (2025) and Enemies With Benefits (2026).

== Early life and education ==
Ployshompoo was born in Bangkok, Thailand on 5 January 1995. Her original nickname is Jan, but she is also known by her another nickname Janhae, derived from the combination of Jan and Donghae as she is a fan of Super Junior's Lee Donghae. She graduated from Bodindecha (Sing Singhaseni) School and went to Thammasat University where she graduated with a bachelor's degree in philosophy, politics, and economics (PPE) in 2017.

== Career ==
Ployshompoo began her career in 2014 after winning a nationwide talent search for the beverage brand B-ing. This competition offered Thai fans the opportunity to appear in a commercial featuring SNSD's Kim Taeyeon. Out of numerous candidates, Ployshompoo was one of two winners selected for the advertisement. Following this debut, she appeared in several music videos and signed with GMMTV.

In 2016, she debuted as an actress by appearing in the television series Senior Secret Love: Puppy Honey. She began to gain recognition for her role as Cream in U-Prince (2016–2017) and Praepailin in SOTUS (2016) and SOTUS S (2017). In the next year, she landed her first main role as Sun, in the 2018 web series YOUniverse alongside Korapat Kirdpan (Nanon).

In November 2019, she debuted as a member of the GMMTV girl group Sizzy (originally SISSY), alongside Methika Jiranorraphat (Jane), Rutricha Phapakithi (Ciize) and Sarunchana Apisamaimongkol (Aye). Known for a youthful pop image, the group released several singles and performed at major GMMTV events before officially disbanding in October 2024.

In 2020, she portrayed Tida, one of the antagonists who often bullies Mind (Tipnaree Weerawatnodom) in the television series Who Are You. For her performance in the series, she won the Best Actress in a Villain Role at the Zoom Dara Awards 2020 and nominated for Best Actress in a Supporting Role at The 25th Asian Television Awards.

In 2022, she played as Lin, a character who swaps body with her brother Win (Sahaphap Wongratch) in Cupid's Last Wish. She later received warm reception for starring as Meen, a member of a group of five women who have their secrets slowly unveiled after one of them committed suicide in the mystery thriller drama television series P.S. I Hate You. In the same year, she played a sapphic role in The Warp Effect alongside Pavida Moriggi and Jessica Pasaphan. She also got the main role of Kat, a young woman who forced to work as a prostitute to pay off her mother's debt in Midnight Series: Midnight Motel.

In 2023, she portrayed Katie in Loneliness Society, Phinya in Home School, and Pai in Cherry Magic. In the next year, she starred as Pangpang in the 2024 horror comedy television series Peaceful Property. In addition to her acting career, she was chosen as the first female brand ambassador for H&M Thailand in 2024.

In 2025, she went on to play various roles in several television series, including as Baibua, one of the Bupphachinda sisters in Hide & Sis. She later played sapphic role again in MuTeLuv: Hello, Is This Luck?, where she played as Na, alongside Prariyapit Yu (JingJing). Her partnership with Yu continued with Enemies With Benefits, and the pair are set to appear in the upcoming drama Bake Love Feeling.

== Filmography ==
Key
†	Denotes films that have not yet been released

=== Television series ===
Year	Title	Role	Notes	Ref.
2016	Senior Secret Love: Puppy Honey	Fun	Guest role	
2016	U-Prince: The Handsome Cowboy	Cream	Guest role	
2016	SOTUS	Praepailin Phutthiaksorn	Supporting role	
2016	U-Prince: The Foxy Pilot	Cream	Guest role	
2017	U-Prince: The Playful Comm-Arts	Cream	Supporting role	
2017	U-Prince: The Crazy Artist	Cream	Supporting role	
2017	U-Prince: The Badly Politics	Cream	Supporting role	
2017	Slam Dance	Praemai	Supporting role	
2017	Fabulous 30: The Series	Gift	Supporting role	
2017	SOTUS S	Praepailin Phutthiaksorn	Supporting role	
2018	Wake Up Ladies: The Series	New	Guest role	
2018	YOUniverse	Supattra Sakunjan (Sun)	Main role	
2018	Happy Birthday	Noinha	Supporting role	
2018	Our Skyy: Arthit-Kongpob	Praepailin Phutthiaksorn	Supporting role	
2019	Wolf	Khwan	Guest role	
2019	The Charming Step Mom	Namfon	Supporting role	
2019	One Night Steal	Bono	Supporting role	
2020	Who Are You	Tida Traiwitsakul	Supporting role	
2020	Tonhon Chonlatee	Miriam	Supporting role	
2021	Nabi, My Stepdarling	Saendee	Supporting role	
2021	Mr. Lipstick	Pijika	Supporting role	
2021	Fish upon the Sky	Bam	Supporting role	
2021	F4 Thailand: Boys Over Flowers – The Secret Story of Iris	Natnada Saenthaweesuk (Um)	Guest role	
2022	Cupid's Last Wish	Lalin Warodom (Lin) / Win	Main role	
2022	P.S. I Hate You	Meena Jessina (Meen)	Main role	
2022	The Warp Effect	Nim	Supporting role	
2022	Midnight Series: Midnight Motel	Kat	Main role	
2023	Loneliness Society	Katie	Supporting role	
2023	Home School	Phinya	Guest role	
2023	Cherry Magic	Pai	Supporting role	
2024	Peaceful Property	Pangpang	Main role	
2025	Break Up Service	Komai	Guest role	
2025	Hide & Sis	Boontharika Bupphachinda (Baibua)	Main role	
2025	Melody of Secrets	Darakorn Decha-anek (Dao)	Supporting role	
2025	MuTeLuv: Hello, Is This Luck?	Nararat Jongmankit (Na)	Main role	
2026	Missing	Aim	Main role	
2026	Enemies With Benefits	Lallalin (Lal)	Main role	
TBA	Bake Love Feeling †	Lallalin (Lal)	Supporting role	
TBA	My Beautiful Enemy †	Vir	Main role	
TBA	Beyond You †	Gale	Supporting role	

=== Television show ===
Year	Title	Network	Notes	Ref.
2018–2019	#TEAMGIRL	GMM 25		

=== Music video appearances ===
Year	Title	Artist	Ref.
2015	"รูปไม่หล่อมีสิทธิ์ไหมครับ"	Cowboy ft. Dao Khummin + Pong Phatthalung	
2015	"รอฉันอยู่ตรงนั้น"	Kacha Nontanun ft. F.HERO	
2016	"เธอคือ"	Mr.Lazy ft. Beau Sunita	
2016	"ร่มคันหนึ่ง"	The soundblossom ft. ม่อน Pure	
2017	"รู้งี้"	Phrik Supavej ft. BABY$CA$H & Chocolate-T	
2018	"จักรวาลเธอ" (YOUniverse)	Korapat Kirdpan (Nanon)	
2018	"ผู้บ่าวรองเท้าแตะ (รัก ฝัน ส้นตีน)"	Kong Huayrai	
2020	"มองกี่ทีก็น่ารัก" (CUTE CUTE)	Korapat Kirdpan (Nanon)	
2021	"ใครคิดถึงก่อนคนนั้นแพ้"	LOSTBOYS	
2021	"เขาดีอย่างนั้นเลิกกันทำไม"	LOSTBOYS	
2021	"จักรวาลที่ฉันต้องการมีแค่เธอ" (My Universe is You)	Korapat Kirdpan (Nanon)	
2022	"ทักครับ" (TUK KRUB)	Lipta ft. GUYGEEGEE	
2024	"ดาวเดิม" (B612)	Korapat Kirdpan (Nanon)	

== Discography ==
=== Singles ===
==== Digital singles ====
===== Collaborations =====
Year	Title	Label	Ref.
2026	"Don't Come Down" with JingJing Yu	GMMTV Records	

===== Soundtrack appearances =====
Year	Title	Soundtrack	Label	Ref.
2022	"ว่างอยู่ (Available)" with Ciize Rutricha	Mama Gogo OST	GMMTV Records	
2026	"งั้นรักละ (Don’t wanna, But I Do)" with JingJing Yu	Enemies With Benefits OST	GMMTV Records	
2026	"Wine I hate you?" with JingJing Yu	Enemies With Benefits OST	GMMTV Records	
2026	"ฉันผิดเองที่รักเธอ (It’s all my fault)"	Enemies With Benefits OST	GMMTV Records	

== Fan meetings ==
Title	Date	Venue	Notes	Ref.
Meet Greet Eat ว้าก With SOTUS the Series	January 14, 2017	Scala Cinema, Siam Square	With SOTUS Cast	
Melody of Secrets: Final EP. FanMeeting	February 13, 2026	6th Fl. Siam Pavalai Theatre, Paragon Cineplex	With Melody of Secrets Cast	
Enemies with Benefits: Fight at First Sight	May 3, 2026	6th Fl. Siam Pavalai Theatre, Paragon Cineplex	With Enemies with Benefits Cast	
Enemies With Benefits Final EP. FanMeeting	July 5, 2026	MCC Hall 3rd Fl. The Mall Lifestore Bangkapi	With Enemies with Benefits Cast	
Enemies with Benefits FanMeeting in Macau	July 25, 2026	Fisherman's Wharf Convention and Exhibition Center	With Enemies with Benefits Cast	
GMMTV International Novel Festival 2026	July 31, 2026	Samyan Mitrtown, 5th Fl.	With JingJing	
Starry Veil's Embrace: the Encounter with Jan	August 22, 2026	China	—N/a	
Enemies with Benefits FanMeeting in Taipei	September 6, 2026	Zepp New Taipei	With Enemies with Benefits Cast	
GMMTV FanDay 35: Enemies with Benefits	September 26, 2026	Nguyen Du Gymnasium, Ho Chi Minh City	With Enemies with Benefits Cast	
GMMTV FanDay 36 in Tokyo	October 2, 2026	New Pier Hall	With JingJing	
GMMTV FanDay 37 in Paris	October 4, 2026	NOVOTEL PARIS EST Centre de Conference	With JingJing	
GMMTV Fanival: Happy Family	October 7, 2026	Union Hall, Union Mall	With JingJing	
Enemies with Benefits FanMeeting in Seoul	October 11, 2026	Coex Artium	With Enemies with Benefits Cast	
Enemies with Benefits FanMeeting in Singapore	December 5, 2026	D’Marquee, Downtown East	With Enemies with Benefits Cast	
Enemies with Benefits Fan Meeting in Hong Kong	December 12, 2026	MacPherson Stadium	With Enemies with Benefits Cast	
Enemies with Benefits FanMeeting in Manila	January 9, 2027	The Crossroad Center, Quezon City	With Enemies with Benefits Cast	

== Concerts ==
Title	Date	Venue	Notes	Ref.
SOTUS: The Memories	May 5, 2018	Thunder Dome, Muang Thong Thani	With SOTUS Cast	
F4 Thailand: Shooting Star Concert	July 23, 2022	Union Hall, Union Mall	With Tu, Bright, Win, Dew, Nani, Prim, Gawin, Fah	
Get Rising to RISER	May 5, 2023	Centralworld, Square A	With Krist, Bright, Nanon, Sizzy, LYKN	
JuniorMark ShineRise Fancon	August 12, 2025	Union Hall, Union Mall	With Junior, Mark, Sing, Force, Book	
Blush Blossom Fan Fest: Midnight Bloom	June 13–14, 2026	BITEC LIVE	With JingJing, Milk, Love, Namtan, Film, Emi, Bonnie, View, Mim, June, Mewnich, Pahn, Fond, Kapook, Ciize	
SOTUS Teniversary Concert	August 29–30, 2026	Union Hall, Union Mall	With Krist, Singto, New, Neen, Gunsmile, Fluke, Off, Ice, Oat, Wawa, Prince, Amp, Gun Achi	
Nineentertain 24th Anniversary Charity Concert	September 30, 2026	Parc Paragon, Siam Paragon	With JingJing, Krist, Almond, Progress, Felizz, Clo'ver	
Oh My Fourth Concert	October 16, 2026	BITEC LIVE	With Fourth	
Blush Blossom Fan Fest: Midnight Bloom in Macau	October 24, 2026	Fisherman's Wharf Convention & Exhibition Center	With JingJing, Milk, Love, Namtan, Film, Emi, Bonnie, View, Mim, Pahn, Fond, Kapook, Ciize	
Blush Blossom Fan Fest: Midnight Bloom in Kaohsiung	November 7, 2026	Kaohsiung Music Center	With JingJing, Milk, Love, Namtan, Film, Emi, Bonnie, View, Mim, Pahn, Fond, Kapook, Ciize	
JanJingJing Bewitch You Fancon	November 21–22, 2026	Thunder Dome, Muang Thong Thani	With JingJing	

== Awards and nominations ==
Year	Award	Category	Work	Result	Ref.
2020	Zoom Dara Awards 2020	Popular Single	"เปลี่ยนคะแนนเป็นแฟนได้ไหม" (Love Score) by Sizzy x Nanon	Won	
2020	Zoom Dara Awards 2020	Best Actress in a Villain Role	Who Are You	Won	
2021	25th Asian Television Awards	Best Actress in a Supporting Role	Who Are You	Nominated	
2021	Kazz Awards 2021	Popular Female Teenage Award		Nominated	
2021	Kazz Awards 2021	Popular Young Woman of The Year		Won	
2022	Kazz Awards 2022	Popular Female Teenage Award		Won	
2023	Kazz Awards 2023	The Best Actress of The Year		Nominated	
2024	Kazz Awards 2024	The Best Actress of The Year		Nominated	
2025	Thailand Y Content Awards 2024	Best Supporting Actress	Peaceful Property	Nominated	
