= Naravit Lertratkosum =

Thai actor, model and singer (born 2001)

- ณราวิชญ์ เลิศรัตน์โกสุมภ์
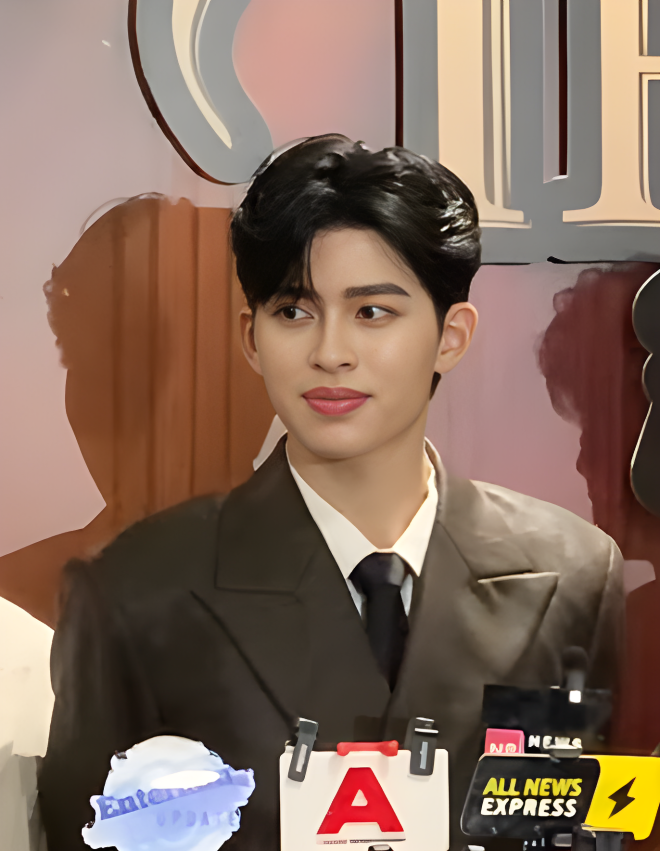
- Naravit in January 2026
- Born: 1 February 2001 (age 25); Bangkok, Thailand
- Other name: Pond Naravit
- Education: King Mongkut's Institute of Technology Ladkrabang
- Occupation: Actor
- Years active: 2020–present
- Agent: GMMTV
- Known for: Mork in Fish upon the Sky; Palm in Never Let Me Go; Phum in We Are; Day in Leap Day; Thee in Me and Thee
- Height: 1.85 m (6 ft 1 in)
- Musical career
- Genres: Pop; T-pop
- Label: Riser Music
- Member of: JASP.ER

Naravit Lertratkosum (Thai: ณราวิชญ์ เลิศรัตน์โกสุมภ์; born 1 February 2001), nicknamed Pond (Thai: ปอนด์), is a Thai actor singer. He began his career after winning the Go On Girl & Guy Star Search in 2020, which led to an exclusive contract with GMMTV. He gained widespread recognition for his role as Mork in the 2021 series Fish upon the Sky. In addition to his acting career, Naravit is a member of the Thai boy group JASP.ER, formed by Riser Music.

== Early life and education ==
Naravit was born on 1 February 2001 in Bangkok, Thailand. He first started his studies in Biomedical Engineering, but later changed to Engineering Management and Entrepreneurship at the King Mongkut's Institute of Technology Ladkrabang. In 2019, during his early college days, Naravit was named the "Most Handsome Man" in the Faculty of Engineering and was a candidate for the "Hot Student" competition of the Ladkrabang Raja Mongkut Institute of Technology.

== Career ==
=== 2020–2021: Rising popularity, Fish upon the Sky ===
In 2020, Naravit started his career when he won the third season of Go On Girl & Guy Star Search by Clean & Clear. Following his win, he signed an exclusive contract with GMMTV in the same year. He first appeared on television when he played Non, an extra role in the science fiction series The Gifted: Graduation (2020). His part was aired after each episode, as part of the promotion for Clean & Clear.

In 2021, he took on his first lead role in the Thai comedy series Fish upon the Sky when he played Mork, skyrocketing his career.

=== 2022–2023: Never Let Me Go, Our Skyy 2 ===
Naravit starred in the lead role as Palm in Never Let Me Go (2022), a mafia-themed series produced by GMMTV, together with Phuwin Tangsakyuen as his love interest and Wachirawit Ruangwiwat (Chimon) as his love rival.

At the Kazz Awards 2022, Naravit was named "Rising Male Actor of the Year" for his performance in Fish upon the Sky.

In 2023, Naravit played Judo in Dirty Laundry, a mysterious lead in a thrilling money chase. he reprised his role as Palm in Our Skyy 2, bringing back the chemistry from Never Let Me Go. He also played Alan in Loneliness Society, showcasing a different side of his acting.

=== 2024–present: We Are, Leap Day, and Me and Thee ===
Naravit continued to expand his acting career with his lead role as Phum in the television series We Are (2024). His performances earned him multiple accolades, including the Japan Expo Actors Award, which he received alongside his co-star Phuwin. Additionally, the duo won the Couple of the Year award at the Feed Y Awards 2024.

In 2025, Naravit starred as Day in the Thai mystery thriller series Leap Day. Pond and his on-screen partner Phuwin were also cast as the main leads of the comedy television series Me and Thee (2025). The series gained nationwide recognition due to its many comedic lakorn references and Pond became widely known as his character Thee, a soap opera-loving mafia heir.

Pond got his first voice role in 2026 as Tom Lizard in the Thai dubbed version of the Pixar animation movie Hoppers. In April, Naravit and Phuwin gave their first full radio interview in the United States with Zach Sang. Following the massive success of Me and Thee, the 4-part mini series Peach and Me was announced in January and started to air on 11 July. The Pond Phuwin Space Soul-dyssey Concert was held at Impact Arena on 21–23 August.

== Filmography ==
=== Film ===
Year	Title	Role	Notes	Ref.
2026	Hoppers	Tom Lizard	Voice role, Thai version	

=== Television series ===
Key
†	Denotes television productions that have not yet been released

Year	Title	Role	Network	Notes	Ref.
2020	The Gifted: Graduation	Non	GMM 25	Guest role	
2021	Fish upon the Sky	"Mork" Suttaya Nithikornkul	GMM 25	Main role	
2022	Never Let Me Go	"Palm" Pannakorn Jannaloy	GMM 25	Main role	
2023	Dirty Laundry	Judo	GMM 25	Supporting role	
2023	Our Skyy 2	"Palm" Pannakorn Jannaloy	GMM 25	Main role	
2023	Loneliness Society	Alan Sunthornpodjanaruj	GMM 25	Supporting role	
2024	We Are	Phum	GMM 25	Main role	
2025	Leap Day	"Day" Itsara Jittiphat	GMM 25	Main role	
2025	Me and Thee	"Thee" Theerakit Kian Lee	GMM 25	Main role	
2026	Peach and Me	"Thee" Theerakit Kian Lee	GMM 25	Main role	
TBA	High & Low: Born to Be High †	Big Mac	TBA	Supporting role	
TBA	The Missing Sunshine †	Noom	TBA	Main role	
TBA	The Halo †	Jaran	TBA	Main role	

=== Television show ===
Year	Title	Network	Notes	Ref.
2020	Go On Girl & Guy Star Search 2020	GMM 25	Contestant	
2020	เกมน้องกองพี่ Game Nong Gong Phi	GMMTV		
2021	School Rangers	GMM 25	Ep. 167–168	
2021	Arm Share	GMMTV	Ep. 72, 83	
2021	Safe House Season 1	GMMTV		
2021	Talk with Toeys - โคตร ซ่อน แอบ!	GMM 25	Ep. 34	
2022	รุ่นนี้ต้องรอด Young Survivors	GMMTV	Ep. 1, 4	
2022	Arm Share	GMMTV	Ep. 99, 113	
2022	LittleBigworld with Pond Phuwin	GMMTV	Host, Ep. 1–12	
2022	Talk with Toeys	GMM 25	Ep. 70	
2023	School Rangers	GMM 25	Ep. 253–254	
2023	Project Alpha	GMM 25	Ep. 7	
2023	Missionทำด้วยใจ – Mission Done with Heart	GMMTV	Ep. 1–4, 8, 10	
2023	LittleBigworld with Pond Phuwin	GMMTV	Ep. 13	
2024	Fully Booked	GMMTV	Cast Member	
2024	Arm Share	GMMTV	Ep. 149	
2024	LittleBigworld with Pond Phuwin	GMMTV	Ep. 14	
2024	School Rangers	GMMTV	Ep. 8, 20	
2024	The Wall Song	Workpoint TV	Ep. 220	
2025	Bestie Tasty	GMMTV	Ep. 1	
2025	The Wall Song	Workpoint TV	Ep. 234	
2025	LittleBigworld with Pond Phuwin	GMMTV	Ep. 15	
2025	แฉ Chae	GMM 25	24 December 2025	
2026	เฮ็ดอย่างเซียนหรั่ง Het Yang Sian Rang	One Playground	Ep. 71 (18 January 2026)	
2026	Bestie Tasty Season 3	GMMTV	Ep. 4	

=== Web series ===
Year	Title	Role	Notes	Ref.
2026	Thee and Thee	"Thee" Theerakit Kian Lee / Theerak	Main role	

=== Music video appearances ===
Year	Title	Artist	Label	Ref.
2022	"เพื่อเธอแค่หนึ่ง เดียว" (Living for You); Never Let Me Go OST	Phuwin Tangsakyuen	GMMTV Records	
2024	"นานตลอดกาล (We Are Forever)"; We Are OST	Phuwin Tangsakyuen	GMMTV Records	
2024	"อยู่คนเดียวกับเขา"	Zom Marie	ZomMarie Music	
2024	"ไม่ก้าวผ่าน"	Zom Marie	ZomMarie Music	
2025	"Abracadabra" (จงรัก จงหลง)	Felizz	Riser Music	
2025	"Love's Eye View"; Me and Thee OST	Phuwin Tangsakyuen	GMMTV Records	

== Discography ==
=== Singles ===
==== Digital Singles ====
===== Collaborations =====
Year	Title	Label	Ref.
2023	"100 Seasons" with Phuwin Tangsakyuen	GMMTV Records	
2023	"Hugs" with Phuwin, Off, Gun, Tay, New, Gemini, Fourth, Perth, Chimon	GMMTV Records	
2024	"You're My Treasure" with Phuwin, Earth, Mix, Force, Book, Joong, Dunk, Jimmy, Sea, First, Khaotung, Gemini, Fourth, Winny, Satang, Perth, Chimon	GMMTV Records	
2024	"Charm" with LYKN, Joong Archen	Riser Music	
2025	"ดาวของฉัน (You're My Star)" with Phuwin Tangsakyuen	GMMTV Records	
2026	"Love Feels So Fast" with Phuwin, Earth, Boun, Prem, Mix, Force, Book, Joong, Dunk, Jimmy, Sea, First, Khaotung, Gemini, Fourth, Perth, Santa, William, Est, Junior, Mark, Joss, Gawin	GMMTV Records	

===== Soundtrack appearances =====
Year	Title	Album	Label	Ref.
2023	"หนึ่งเดียว (Only One)"	Never Let Me Go OST	GMMTV Records	
2024	"เรามีเรา (We Are)" with Phuwin, Winny, Satang, Aou, Boom, Marc, Poon	We Are OST	GMMTV Records	
2024	"แค่ในวันนั้น (Truth in the Eyes)" with Phuwin Tangsakyuen	We Are OST	GMMTV Records	
2025	"แค่คนขี้เหงา (Me and You)" with Phuwin Tangsakyuen	Me and Thee OST	GMMTV Records	
2025	"ไม่มีคำว่ามากไป (Everything is for You)"	Me and Thee OST	GMMTV Records	
2026	"บอกธีร์ (One Word)"	Me and Thee OST	GMMTV Records	
2026	"มีเธอดีกว่า (You with Me)" with Phuwin Tangsakyuen	Peach and Me OST	GMMTV Records	
2026	"มีเพียงเธอ (My Only Focus)" with Phuwin Tangsakyuen	Peach and Me OST	GMMTV Records	

== Fan meetings ==
Solo

Title	Date	Venue	Ref.
So Pond With U: Pond Fan Meeting in Guiyang	2 May 2024	Guiyang International Eco-conference Center	
GMMTV Fan Event in Tokyo	13 July 2024	Shibuya Stream Hall	
Glad to meet U: Pond Fan Meeting in Qingdao	10 August 2024	Tempo Livehouse	
Stand by Pond: Pond Fan Sign in Shanghai	28 December 2024	Shanghai, China	
GMMTV Fan Day 17 in Jakarta	22 February 2025	Bekasi Convention Center	
Yizhiyu Offline Event in Qingdao: Pond Special Fan Event	22 March 2025	Qingdao, China	
A Little Joy: Pond Fan Meeting in Guangzhou	13 July 2025	Guangzhou, China	
Autumn Blossom: Pond Fan Event in Shanghai	5 October 2025	Shanghai, China	
Meet the Dominant CEO: Pond Fan Sign in Hangzhou	8 February 2026	Hangzhou, China	
Pond With You! Pond Fan Sign in Shanghai	3 May 2026	Shanghai, China	
Devotion Across Miles: Pond Fan Meeting in Hong Kong	9 January 2027	Hong Kong, China	

Joint

Title	Date	Venue	Notes	Ref.
A Sky Full of Fish: Fish Upon the Sky Fan Meeting	4 September 2021	TTM Live (Live stream)	With Fish upon the Sky cast	
GMMTV Fan Day in Tokyo	29 January 2023	Hokutopia Sakura Hall	With Phuwin	
PondPhuwin Fan Meeting in Cambodia	19 February 2023	Major Cineplex by Smart, Aeon Mall Mean Chey	With Phuwin	
Never Let Me Go Final EP. Fan Meeting	28 February 2023	True Icon Hall, Iconsiam	With Never Let Me Go cast	
Miracle in April: PondPhuwin Fan Meeting in Vietnam	8 April 2023	District 10 Cultural Center	With Phuwin	
PondPhuwin Fan Meeting in Macau	6 August 2023	H853 Entertainment Place	With Phuwin	
GMMTV Fan Day 7 in Cambodia	9–10 September 2023	Aeon Hall, Aeon Mall Sen Sok City	With Phuwin	
PondPhuwin Fan Meeting in Hong Kong	4 November 2023	Rotunda 2, KITEC	With Phuwin	
Celebrate Winter: PondPhuwin Fan Meeting in Osaka	24 November 2023	Toyonaka Performing Arts Center	With Phuwin	
PondPhuwin Fan Meeting in Taipei	2 December 2023	Zepp New Taipei, Honhui Plaza	With Phuwin	
GMMTV Fan Day 13 in Manila	6 July 2024	SM North EDSA Skydome	With Phuwin	
We Are Forever Fan Meeting in Tokyo	17–18 October 2024	Tachikawa Stage Garden	With We Are cast	
We Are Forever Fan Meeting in Hong Kong	20 October 2024	The Londoner, Macau	With We Are cast	
We Are Forever Fan Meeting in Taipei	2 November 2024	Legacy TERA	With We Are cast	
Leap Day: First Screening	1 April 2025	SF World Cinema, CentralWorld	With Leap Day cast	
Leap Day: Final Screening	24 June 2025	SF World Cinema, CentralWorld	With Leap Day cast	
PondPhuwin Fan Meeting in Hong Kong	9 August 2025	AXA Dreamland, Go Park	With Phuwin	
Me and Thee: Premiere Night	15 November 2025	MCC Hall, The Mall Lifestore Bangkapi	With Me and Thee cast	
Me and Thee: Fan Party	17 January 2026	Union Hall, Union Mall	With Me and Thee cast	
Me and Thee: After Party	18 January 2026	Union Hall, Union Mall	With Me and Thee cast	
GMMTV Fan Day 29 in USA	10 March 2026	Brooklyn Steel, New York	With Phuwin	
GMMTV Fan Day 29 in USA	15 March 2026	Alex Theatre, Los Angeles	With Phuwin	
Peach and Me: Premiere Night	11 July 2026	Union Hall, Union Mall	With Peach and Me cast	
JIB Dream Fanmeet 7	20 August 2026	Hilton Rome Airport Hotel, Rome	With Phuwin	

== Concerts ==
Title	Date	Venue	Notes	Ref.
Feel Fan Fun Camping Concert	15 October 2022	Union Hall, Union Mall	With Phuwin, Earth, Mix, Joong, Dunk	
Love Out Loud Fan Fest 2023: Lovolution	24–25 June 2023	Royal Paragon Hall, Siam Paragon	With Phuwin, Earth, Mix, Ohm, Nanon, Force, Book, Joong, Dunk, Jimmy, Sea, First, Khaotung, Gemini, Fourth	
GMMTV Fan Fest 2023: Japan	9 October 2023	PIA ARENA MM	With Phuwin, Earth, Ohm, Nanon, Mix, Force, Book, Joong, Dunk, Jimmy, Sea, First, Khaotung, Gemini, Fourth, Perth, Chimon, Gawin, Krist	
GMMTV Happy Weekend: Sunday Funday	25 February 2024	Tachikawa Stage Garden	With Gun, Mix, Book, Joong, Fourth	
Love Out Loud Fan Fest 2024: The Love Pirates	18–19 May 2024	Impact Arena, Muang Thong Thani	With Phuwin, Earth, Mix, Force, Book, Joong, Dunk, Jimmy, Sea, First, Khaotung, Gemini, Fourth, Winny, Satang, Perth, Chimon	
We Are Forever Fancon	16–17 August 2024	True Icon Hall, Iconsiam	With Phuwin, Winny, Satang, Aou, Boom, Marc, Poon, Pepper, Tee, JJ	
We Are Forever Fancon in Vietnam	14 September 2024	Hoa Binh Theater	With Phuwin, Winny, Satang, Aou, Boom, Marc, Poon	
GMMTV Fan Fest 2025: Japan	13 January 2025	Tokyo Garden Theater, Tokyo	With Phuwin, Krist, Singto, Off, Gun, Tay, New, Jimmy, Sea, Gemini, Fourth	
Love Out Loud Fan Fest 2025: Lovemosphere	17–18 May 2025	Impact Arena, Muang Thong Thani	With Phuwin, Earth, Boun, Prem, Mix, Force, Book, Joong, Dunk, Jimmy, Sea, First, Khaotung, Gemini, Fourth, Winny, Satang, Perth, Santa, William, Est	
PondPhuwin Rendezvous Fancon	31 October 2025	Union Hall, Union Mall	With Phuwin, Gemini	
PondPhuwin Rendezvous Fancon	1 November 2025	Union Hall, Union Mall	With Phuwin, Winny, Satang	
PondPhuwin Rendezvous Fancon	2 November 2025	Union Hall, Union Mall	With Phuwin, Fourth	
PondPhuwin Rendezvous Fancon in Macau	19 February 2026	Fisherman's Wharf Convention and Exhibition Centre	With Phuwin	
GMMTV Fan Fest 2026: Japan	21 February 2026	Tokyo Garden Theater, Japan	With Phuwin, Krist, Singto, Off, Gun, Tay, New, Boun, Prem, Joong, Dunk, Sky, Nani	
PondPhuwin Rendezvous Fancon in Singapore	4 April 2026	The Theatre at Mediacorp, Singapore	With Phuwin	
Love Out Loud Fan Fest 2026: Heart Race	22–24 May 2026	Impact Arena, Muang Thong Thani	With Phuwin, Earth, Boun, Prem, Mix, Force, Book, Joong, Dunk, Jimmy, Sea, First, Khaotung, Gemini, Fourth, Perth, Santa, William, Est, Junior, Mark, Joss, Gawin	
PondPhuwin Rendezvous Fancon in Hong Kong	13 June 2026	AXA Dreamland, Go Park	With Phuwin	
PondPhuwin Rendezvous Fancon in Vietnam	18 July 2026	Hoa Binh Theatre, Ho Chi Minh City	With Phuwin	
PondPhuwin Rendezvous Fancon in Taipei	25 July 2026	Legacy TERA, Taipei	With Phuwin	
PondPhuwin Rendezvous Fancon in Manila	2 August 2026	New Frontier Theater, Manila	With Phuwin	
GMMTV Fan Fest 2026: Macau	8 August 2026	The Venetian Cotai Expo Hall	With Phuwin, Boun, Prem, Joong, Dunk, Jimmy, Sea, Gemini, Fourth, Perth, Santa, Almond, Progress	
PondPhuwin Space Soul-dyssey Concert	21 August 2026	Impact Arena, Muang Thong Thani	With Phuwin, Perth, Santa, Est, Emi, Bonnie	
PondPhuwin Space Soul-dyssey Concert	22–23 August 2026	Impact Arena, Muang Thong Thani	With Phuwin, Perth, Santa, Est, Emi, Bonnie, Joong, Aou	

== Awards and nominations ==
Award nominations for Naravit Lertratkosum
Year	Award	Category	Nominee(s)	Result	Ref.
2022	รางวัลพระพิฆเนศวร ประจำปี 2565 (Ganesha Award 2022)	นักแสดงหน้าใหม่ดีเด่น (Outstanding Rising Actor) with Phuwin Tangsakyuen	Fish upon the Sky	Won	
2022	Kazz Awards 2022	Rising Male Actor of The Year	Fish upon the Sky	Won	
2022	Kazz Awards 2022	Num Wai Sai 2021 (Popular Male Teenager)	—N/a	Won	
2024	Japan Expo Thailand Award 2024	Actors Award with Phuwin Tangsakyuen	—N/a	Won	
2024	Line Stickers Awards 2023	Best Couple Stickers with Phuwin Tangsakyuen	PondPhuwin	Won	
2024	Feed Y Awards 2024	Couple of the Year with Phuwin Tangsakyuen	We Are	Won	
2024	Best Artist Award 2024	Popular Y-series Actor	—N/a	Won	
2025	2025 Weibo Cultural Exchange Night	Most Popular Young Actor	—N/a	Won	
2025	Mint Awards 2025	Best of Mint Six Pack (Special Award)	—N/a	Won	
2026	Kazz Awards 2026	People of the Year	—N/a	Won	
2026	Thailand Y Content Awards 2025	Best Leading Actor	Me and Thee	Nominated	
2026	Feed x Khaosod Awards 2026	Boys' Love Actor of the Year	Me and Thee	Nominated	
2026	Feed x Khaosod Awards 2026	Best Chemistry of the Year with Phuwin Tangsakyuen	—N/a	Nominated	
