= Phuwin Tangsakyuen =

Thai actor (born 2003)

- ภูวินทร์ ตั้งศักดิ์ยืน
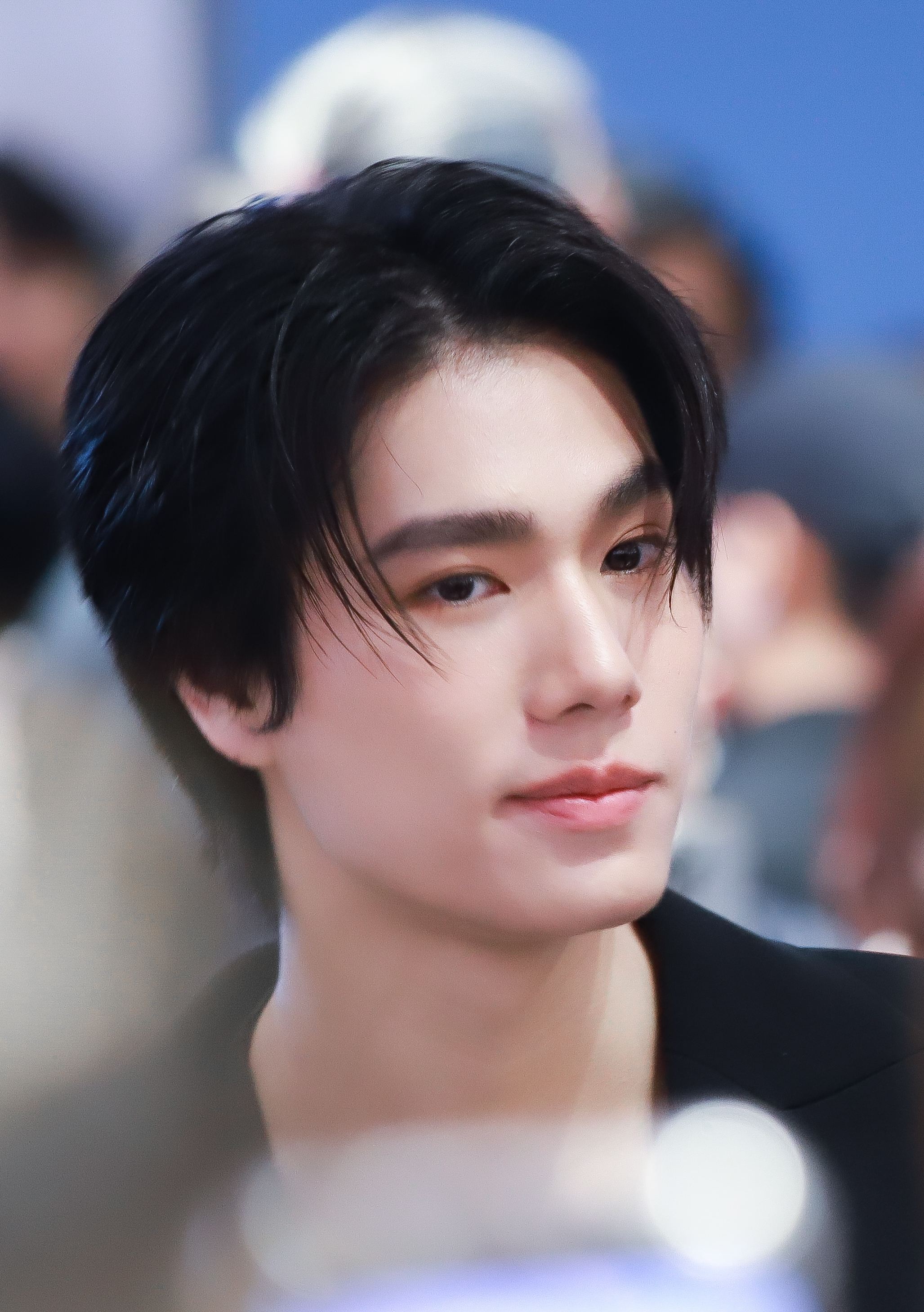
- Phuwin in September 2024
- Born: 5 July 2003 (age 23); Bangkok, Thailand
- Education: Chulalongkorn University
- Occupation: Actor
- Years active: 2014–present
- Agent: GMMTV
- Known for: Third in The Gifted: Graduation; Pi in Fish upon the Sky; Nuengdiao in Never Let Me Go; Peem in We Are; Peach in Me and Thee

Phuwin Tangsakyuen (Thai: ภูวินทร์ ตั้งศักดิ์ยืน; born 5 July 2003) is a Thai actor under GMMTV and a singer under Riser Music. Phuwin began his career as a child actor and gained popularity for his lead role as Pi in the BL series Fish upon the Sky (2021).

== Early life and education ==
Phuwin was born on 5 July 2003 in Bangkok, Thailand. After graduating Kindergarten - Year 4 from Ascot International School Bangkok, he attended Ruamrudee International School until Grade 11. He got a GED diploma and enrolled at Chulalongkorn University, Faculty of Engineering. He graduated in Information and Communication Engineering (International Program) in 2024.

== Career ==
=== 2014–2016: Beginnings as a child actor ===
Phuwin made his debut at the age of eleven in television drama. He appeared in his first television drama Sunshine My Friend (2014). Since then, he went on to play the younger characters of the lead roles in television dramas such as in Neung Nai Suang (2015), Mafia Luerd Mungkorn (2015), and Sane Rai Ubai Rak (2016). He has also played Friedrich von Trapp in the 2015 Thai adaptation of the musical The Sound of Music at Muangthai Rachadalai Theatre.

=== 2018–2021: Rising popularity ===
Phuwin starred as main role in the 'Cause You're My Boy series (2018), playing the role of Morn. He then starred as one of the main role in the science fantasy series The Gifted: Graduation (2020). He played the role of Third, who has the potential to mind-read. He then went on to take on the lead role in the comedy series Fish upon the Sky (2021). Phuwin also started his own clothing label DialBlack.

=== 2022–2025: Breakthrough with Never Let Me Go, We Are, and Overwatch 2 ===
Aside from the BL (boys' love) projects that raised his name beyond Thailand, Phuwin also took part in other series such as The Warp Effect (2022), in which he portrayed a teenage character named Ice.

Following the success of Fish upon the Sky (2021) with his on-screen partner, Naravit Lertratkosum (Pond), the two came back by starring in the GMMTV original BL series titled Never Let Me Go (2022) as the main characters. To celebrate the last episode of the series, a special fan meeting was held on 28 February 2023. The event was attended by him and Pond Naravit as the lead couple, along with co-stars Tanapon Sukumpantanasan (Perth), Wachirawit Ruangwiwat (Chimon), Pawin Kulkaranyawich, and Wanwimol Jaenasavamethee (June).

Phuwin also participated in a special series called Our Skyy 2 (2023) alongside Naravit, where he reprises his role as Nuengdiao Kiattrakulmethee from Never Let Me Go (2022). The first episode was released on 19 April 2023.

In the same year, he made his movie debut in Hoon Payon (2023), a horror movie based on the Thai enchanted effigies of the dead. He portrayed Tham, the skeptical lead-role who travels a long way to see his ordained monk brother in deep mountain, who later finds himself in a supernatural situation. However, the movie had to be postponed as it received a 20+ rating a few days before its original release date on 9 March 2023. After the re-rating process, the movie received an 18+ rating, which allowed them to set the new release date to be on 12 April 2023. The movie released both versions with different age ratings as Hoon Payon and Plook Payon.

In April 2023, Phuwin was announced as the voice actor of a new hero in the first-person shooter game, Overwatch 2. The new hero, Lifeweaver aka Niran “Bua” Pruksamanee, is claimed to be the first of Thai-origin and openly pansexual character in the gaming industry. Phuwin passed the blind audition in which they were looking for a native Thai who is fluent in English as there are some in-game scripts in the character’s mother tongue. The news of his voice acting debut in the popular game by Blizzard Entertainment made his name known in the international gaming scene. The new character voiced by Phuwin was launched on 12 April 2023, coinciding with Songkran.

Another project of Phuwin was Wednesday Club (2023). In this series, he participated as one of the main role named Kul. He also played the role of Peem in We Are (2024), alongside Naravit.

He later participated in Summer Night (2024), a non-BL series, in which he played the main role named Lune, alongside Parn Nachcha. Demonstrating his musical talents, Phuwin made his solo debut as a singer on 19 September 2024 with the digital single "To You" under Riser Music.

In the same year, Phuwin became affiliated with American fashion brand Tommy Hilfiger as brand ambassador and with Spanish luxury fashion brand Loewe as friend of house.

=== 2025–present: Expanding career with Taste, and Me and Thee ===
In 2025, Phuwin portrayed Kris Tangsinsup a teenage singer entangled in his family's dark secrets in Netflix series Dalah: Death and the Flowers (2025), earning praise for his compelling performance. Phuwin voiced Hiccup in the Thai dub of How to Train Your Dragon (2025). He also starred in Taste (2025) as Diesel. Phuwin released his second single "All In" on 15 September 2025.

Phuwin and Pond held a special event PondPhuwin Rendezvous Fancon 2025 at Union Hall, Union Mall, on 1–2 November 2025. The first fancon sold out several ticket categories instantly, with the organizers adding an extra show on 31 October that was also sold out.

Phuwin starred as Peach in Me and Thee, alongside Pond, which aired from November 2025 until January 2026. The series gained nationwide recognition due to its comedic lakorn references.

In February 2026, Phuwin performed among other artists of the same music label at Impact arena for the Riser Concert: The First Rise. On 31 March, Phuwin's third single "A Minute" was released. In April, Phuwin and Pond gave their first full radio interview in the United States with Zach Sang. Following the success of Me and Thee, the 4-part mini series Peach and Me was announced in January and started to air on July 11th.

Phuwin's single "Black Card" was released in August, shortly before Phuwin's and Pond's sold-out concerts. The Pond Phuwin Space Soul-dyssey Concert was held at Impact Arena on 21–23 August.

Phuwin is set to star in the upcoming series Scarlet Heart Ullavee and The Missing Sunshine.

== Filmography ==
=== Film ===
| Year | Title | Role | Notes | Ref. |
|---|---|---|---|---|
| 2023 | Hoon Payon | Tham | Main role | |
| 2025 | How to Train Your Dragon | Hiccup | Voice role, Thai version | |

=== Television series ===
Key
| † | Denotes television productions that have not yet been released |

| Year | Title | Role | Network | Notes | Ref. |
|---|---|---|---|---|---|
| 2014 | Sunshine My Friend | —N/a | Mono 29 | Guest role | |
| 2015 | Neung Nai Suang | Pu Sattha (young) | Channel 3 | Guest role | |
| 2015 | Luerd Mungkorn: Krating | Songklod (young) | Channel 3 | Guest role | |
| 2015 | Luerd Mungkorn: Hong | Songklod (young) | Channel 3 | Guest role | |
| 2016 | Sane Rai Ubai Rak | Thanatus (young) | PPTV | Guest role | |
| 2018 | 'Cause You're My Boy | Morn | One 31 | Main role | |
| 2018 | Our Skyy | Morn | Line TV Original | Supporting role | |
| 2019 | The Charming Step Mom | Namfah | GMM 25 | Supporting role | |
| 2019 | Dark Blue Kiss | Morn | GMM 25 | Guest role | |
| 2020 | My Bubble Tea | Wifi | One 31 | Supporting role | |
| 2020 | The Gifted: Graduation | "Third" Thammarong Decharat | GMM 25 | Main role | |
| 2021 | Fish upon the Sky | "Pi" Pattawee Panichapun | GMM 25 | Main role | |
| 2022 | The Warp Effect | Ice | GMM 25 | Supporting role | |
| 2022 | Never Let Me Go | Nuengdiao Kiattrakulmethee | GMM 25 | Main role | |
| 2023 | Our Skyy 2 | Nuengdiao Kiattrakulmethee | GMM 25 | Main role | |
| 2023 | The Jungle | —N/a | GMM 25 | Guest role | |
| 2023 | Wednesday Club | Kul | GMM 25 | Main role | |
| 2024 | We Are | "Peem" Peeranat Rueangsiriwong | GMM 25 | Main role | |
| 2024 | Summer Night | "Lune" Nontharat Phuwananon | GMM 25 | Main role | |
| 2025 | Dalah: Death and the Flowers | Kris Tangsinsup | Netflix | Supporting role | |
| 2025 | Taste | "Diesel" Danaiphat Sasipattana | One 31 | Main role | |
| 2025 | Me and Thee | "Peach" Peachayarat Janekit | GMM 25 | Main role | |
| 2026 | Wu | Sira | GMM 25 | Guest role | |
| 2026 | Peach and Me | "Peach" Peachayarat Janekit | GMM 25 | Main role | |
| 2026 | Scarlet Heart Ullavee | Prince Fah Haam | One 31 | Main role | |
| TBA | The Missing Sunshine † | "New" Navi / Nas | TBA | Main role | |
| TBA | The Halo † | Pran | TBA | Main role | |

=== Television show ===
| Year | Title | Network | Notes | Ref. |
|---|---|---|---|---|
| 2018 | Talk with Toey Tonight | GMM 25 | Ep. 121 | |
| 2018 | มนุษย์ป้าล่าเด็ก Season 2 | Line TV | Ep. 2 | |
| 2018 | School Rangers | GMM 25 | Ep. 44–46 | |
| 2020 | School Rangers | GMM 25 | Ep. 147–148 | |
| 2021 | School Rangers | GMM 25 | Ep. 167–168 | |
| 2021 | Arm Share | GMMTV | Ep. 72, 83 | |
| 2021 | Safe House Season 1 | GMMTV | | |
| 2022 | รุ่นนี้ต้องรอด Young Survivors | GMMTV | Ep. 1–2 | |
| 2022 | กระหายเล่า Krahai Lao | GMMTV | Ep. 24 | |
| 2022 | Arm Share | GMMTV | Ep. 99, 113 | |
| 2022 | Little Big World with Pond Phuwin | GMMTV | Web series | |
| 2022 | Talk with Toeys | GMM 25 | Ep. 70 | |
| 2023 | School Rangers | GMM 25 | Ep. 253–254 | |
| 2023 | Project Alpha | GMM 25 | Ep. 7, 9 | |
| 2023 | Missionทำด้วยใจ – Mission Done with Heart | GMMTV | Ep. 1–4, 8, 10 | |
| 2023 | The Wall Song | Workpoint TV | Ep. 169 | |
| 2023 | Save 100K – แสบ Save แสน | GMMTV | | |
| 2024 | School Rangers | GMMTV | Ep. 8, 20 | |
| 2024 | Arm Share | GMMTV | Ep. 152 | |
| 2024 | Thailand Music Countdown | Channel 3 | Ep. 21 | |
| 2024 | T-Pop Stage Show | Workpoint TV | 10 October 2024 | |
| 2024 | The Wall Song | Workpoint TV | Ep. 220 | |
| 2025 | Bestie Tasty | GMMTV | Ep. 1 | |
| 2025 | Who Is My Chef | Workpoint TV | Ep. 307 | |
| 2025 | Goodbye ตายไม่รู้ตัว | Workpoint TV | 3 March 2025 | |
| 2025 | 4 ต่อ 4 Celebrity | One 31 | Ep. 953 | |
| 2025 | Guest Who? | One Connection | Ep. 20 | |
| 2025 | T-Pop Stage Show | Workpoint TV | 19 September 2025 | |
| 2025 | แฉ Chae | GMM 25 | 1 July 2025, 24 December 2025 | |
| 2025 | Thailand Music Countdown | Channel 3 | Ep. 21 | |
| 2026 | เฮ็ดอย่างเซียนหรั่ง Het Yang Sian Rang | One Playground | Ep. 71 (18 January 2026) | |
| 2026 | Bestie Tasty Season 3 | GMMTV | Ep. 4 | |

=== Musical ===
| Year | Title | Role | Notes | Ref. |
|---|---|---|---|---|
| 2015 | The Sound of Music (Thailand) | Friedrich | Supporting role | |

=== Web series ===
| Year | Title | Role | Notes | Ref. |
|---|---|---|---|---|
| 2026 | Thee and Thee | Pearachon | Main role | |

=== Music video appearances ===
| Year | Title | Artist | Label | Ref. |
|---|---|---|---|---|
| 2022 | "Together Absolutely" | Ada Chunhavajira | Special Olympics Thailand | |
| 2022 | "แกน่ารักมาตลอด (All Kill)" | Praesun | Kiddo Records | |
| 2023 | "แดนซ์อัพมู้ด (Just Dance)" | Violette Wautier | Brilliant & Million | |
| 2023 | "นี่นะคะ (I'm Here!)" | Mxfruit | Ily Lab | |
| 2024 | "เอ็นดู" | Paradox | Genierock | |

=== Video games ===
| Year | Title | Role | Notes | Ref. |
|---|---|---|---|---|
| 2023 | Overwatch 2 | Lifeweaver/Niran “Bua” Pruksamanee | Voice role, English version | |
| 2025 | How to Train Your Dragon | Hiccup | Thai version | |
| 2025 | Overwatch 2 Season 19 | Mythic Divine Druid Lifeweaver | Voice role, English version | |

== Discography ==
=== Singles ===
==== Digital Singles ====
| Year | Title | Label | Ref. |
|---|---|---|---|
| 2024 | "วันเกิดเธอ (To You)" | Riser Music | |
| 2025 | "เทหมดหน้าตัก (All In)" | Riser Music | |
| 2025 | "เพื่อเธอแค่หนึ่งเดียว (Living For You)"; Japanese version | GMMTV Records | |
| 2026 | "แค่นาทีเดียว (A Minute)" | Riser Music | |
| 2026 | "Black Card" | Riser Music | |

===== Collaborations =====
| Year | Title | Label | Ref. |
|---|---|---|---|
| 2023 | "100 Seasons" with Pond Naravit | GMMTV Records | |
| 2023 | "กอด กอด (Hugs)" with Pond, Off, Gun, Tay, New, Gemini, Fourth, Perth, Chimon | GMMTV Records | |
| 2024 | "You're My Treasure" with Pond, Earth, Mix, Force, Book, Joong, Dunk, Jimmy, Sea, First, Khaotung, Gemini, Fourth, Winny, Satang, Perth, Chimon | GMMTV Records | |
| 2025 | "ดาวของฉัน (You're My Star)" with Pond Naravit | GMMTV Records | |
| 2026 | "Love Feels So Fast" with Pond, Earth, Boun, Prem, Mix, Force, Book, Joong, Dunk, Jimmy, Sea, First, Khaotung, Gemini, Fourth, Perth, Santa, William, Est, Junior, Mark, Joss, Gawin | GMMTV Records | |

===== Soundtrack appearances =====
| Year | Title | Album | Label | Ref. |
|---|---|---|---|---|
| 2018 | "สู้ซ่า (Soo Sah)" (with Sing Harit, Fiat Pattadon) | 'Cause You're My Boy OST | GMMTV Records | |
| 2022 | "เพื่อเธอแค่หนึ่งเดียว (Living For You)" | Never Let Me Go OST | GMMTV Records | |
| 2024 | "เรามีเรา (We Are)" with Pond, Winny, Satang, Aou, Boom, Marc, Poon | We Are OST | GMMTV Records | |
| 2024 | "นานตลอดกาล (We Are Forever)" | We Are OST | GMMTV Records | |
| 2024 | "Truth in the Eyes" with Pond Naravit | We Are OST | GMMTV Records | |
| 2024 | "รักก็คือรัก (No Doubt)" | Summer Night OST | GMMTV Records | |
| 2025 | "แค่คนขี้เหงา (Me and You)" with Pond Naravit | Me and Thee OST | GMMTV Records | |
| 2025 | "ไม่มีคำว่ามากไป (Everything is for You)" | Me and Thee OST | GMMTV Records | |
| 2025 | "Love's Eye View" | Me and Thee OST | GMMTV Records | |
| 2026 | "มีเธอดีกว่า (You with Me)" with Pond Naravit | Peach and Me OST | GMMTV Records | |
| 2026 | "มีเพียงเธอ (My Only Focus)" with Pond Naravit | Peach and Me OST | GMMTV Records | |

== Fan meetings ==
Solo

| Title | Date | Venue | Ref. |
|---|---|---|---|
| Nice to meet U: Phuwin Fan Meeting in Qingdao | 11 August 2024 | Tempo Livehouse | |
| Stay with Phuwin: Phuwin Fan Sign in Shanghai | 29 December 2024 | Shanghai, China | |
| Shine: Phuwin Fan Event in Suzhou | 22 February 2025 | Suzhou, China | |
| Gift For You: Phuwin Fan Meeting in Guangzhou | 12 July 2025 | Guangzhou, China | |
| Stellar Glow: Phuwin Fan Event in Shanghai | 4 October 2025 | Shanghai, China | |
| Reborn as a Photographer: Phuwin Fan Sign in Hangzhou | 7 February 2026 | Hangzhou, China | |
| Phuwin Mode On! Phuwin Fan Sign in Shanghai | 2 May 2026 | Shanghai, China | |
| Melody of Longing: Phuwin Fan Meeting in Hong Kong | 10 January 2027 | Hong Kong, China | |

Joint

| Title | Date | Venue | Notes | Ref. |
|---|---|---|---|---|
| A Sky Full of Fish: Fish Upon the Sky Fan Meeting | 4 September 2021 | TTM Live (Live stream) | With Fish upon the Sky cast | |
| GMMTV Fan Day in Tokyo | 29 January 2023 | Hokutopia Sakura Hall | With Pond | |
| PondPhuwin Fan Meeting in Cambodia | 19 February 2023 | Major Cineplex by Smart, Aeon Mall Mean Chey | With Pond | |
| Never Let Me Go Final EP. Fan Meeting | 28 February 2023 | True Icon Hall, Iconsiam | With Never Let Me Go cast | |
| Miracle in April: PondPhuwin Fan Meeting in Vietnam | 8 April 2023 | District 10 Cultural Center | With Pond | |
| PondPhuwin Fan Meeting in Macau | 6 August 2023 | H853 Entertainment Place | With Pond | |
| GMMTV Fan Day 7 in Cambodia | 9–10 September 2023 | Aeon Hall, Aeon Mall Sen Sok City | With Pond | |
| PondPhuwin Fan Meeting in Hong Kong | 4 November 2023 | Rotunda 2, KITEC | With Pond | |
| Celebrate Winter: PondPhuwin Fan Meeting in Osaka | 24 November 2023 | Toyonaka Performing Arts Center | With Pond | |
| PondPhuwin Fan Meeting in Taipei | 2 December 2023 | Zepp New Taipei, Honhui Plaza | With Pond | |
| GMMTV Fan Day 13 in Manila | 6 July 2024 | SM North EDSA Skydome | With Pond | |
| We Are Forever Fan Meeting in Tokyo | 17–18 October 2024 | Tachikawa Stage Garden | With We Are cast | |
| We Are Forever Fan Meeting in Hong Kong | 20 October 2024 | The Londoner, Macau | With We Are cast | |
| We Are Forever Fan Meeting in Taipei | 2 November 2024 | Legacy TERA | With We Are cast | |
| PondPhuwin Fan Meeting in Hong Kong | 9 August 2025 | AXA Dreamland, Go Park | With Pond | |
| Me and Thee: Premiere Night | 15 November 2025 | MCC Hall, The Mall Lifestore Bangkapi | With Me and Thee cast | |
| Me and Thee: Fan Party | 17 January 2026 | Union Hall, Union Mall | With Me and Thee cast | |
| Me and Thee: After Party | 18 January 2026 | Union Hall, Union Mall | With Me and Thee cast | |
| GMMTV Fan Day 29 in USA | 10 March 2026 | Brooklyn Steel, New York | With Pond | |
| GMMTV Fan Day 29 in USA | 15 March 2026 | Alex Theatre, Los Angeles | With Pond | |
| Peach and Me: Premiere Night | 11 July 2026 | Union Hall, Union Mall | With Peach and Me cast | |
| JIB Dream Fanmeet 7 | 20 August 2026 | Hilton Rome Airport Hotel, Rome | With Pond | |
| Scarlet Heart Ullavee: The Grand Premiere | 4 November 2026 | Union Hall, Union Mall | With Scarlet Heart Ullavee cast | |

== Concerts ==
Solo

| Title | Date | Venue | Ref. |
|---|---|---|---|
| Phuwin Fancon in Nanning | 28 December 2025 | Guangxi Culture and Art Center, Nanning | |
| Phuwin Fancon in Indonesia | 29 April 2027 | Bekasi Convention Center, Jakarta | |

Joint

| Title | Date | Venue | Notes | Ref. |
|---|---|---|---|---|
| Y I Love U Fan Party 2019 next to Ha Island Y | 26-27 January 2019 | Thunder Dome, Muang Thong Thani | With Krist, Singto, Off, Gun, Tay, New, Drake, Frank, Earth, Oaujun, Fiat, Guy, Nammon, Neo | |
| Feel Fan Fun Camping Concert | 15 October 2022 | Union Hall, Union Mall | With Pond, Earth, Mix, Joong, Dunk | |
| Love Out Loud Fan Fest 2023: Lovolution | 24–25 June 2023 | Royal Paragon Hall, Siam Paragon | With Pond, Earth, Mix, Ohm, Nanon, Force, Book, Joong, Dunk, Jimmy, Sea, First, Khaotung, Gemini, Fourth | |
| GMMTV Fan Fest 2023: Japan | 9 October 2023 | Pia Arena MM | With Pond, Earth, Mix, Ohm, Nanon, Force, Book, Joong, Dunk, Jimmy, Sea, First, Khaotung, Gemini, Fourth, Perth, Chimon, Gawin, Krist | |
| GMMTV Happy Weekend: Friday Fineday | 23 February 2024 | Tachikawa Stage Garden | With Tay, Earth, Sea, Khaotung, Gemini, Perth | |
| Love Out Loud Fan Fest 2024: The Love Pirates | 18–19 May 2024 | Impact Arena, Muang Thong Thani | With Pond, Earth, Mix, Force, Book, Joong, Dunk, Jimmy, Sea, First, Khaotung, Gemini, Fourth, Winny, Satang, Perth, Chimon | |
| We Are Forever Fancon | 16–17 August 2024 | True Icon Hall, Iconsiam | With Pond, Winny, Satang, Aou, Boom, Marc, Poon, Pepper, Tee, JJ | |
| We Are Forever Fancon in Vietnam | 14 September 2024 | Hoa Binh Theater | With Pond, Winny, Satang, Aou, Boom, Marc, Poon | |
| GMMTV Musicon 2025: Nanning | 5 January 2025 | Guanxi Sports center Gymnasium, Nanning | With Krist, Nanon, Dunk, Fourth, Perth, LYKN | |
| GMMTV Fan Fest 2025: Japan | 13 January 2025 | Tokyo Garden Theater, Tokyo | With Pond, Krist, Singto, Off, Gun, Tay, New, Jimmy, Sea, Gemini, Fourth | |
| Love Out Loud Fan Fest 2025: Lovemosphere | 17–18 May 2025 | Impact Arena, Muang Thong Thani | With Pond, Earth, Mix, Boun, Prem, Force, Book, Joong, Dunk, Jimmy, Sea, First, Khaotung, Gemini, Fourth, Winny, Satang, Perth, Santa, William, Est | |
| PondPhuwin Rendezvous Fancon | 31 October 2025 | Union Hall, Union Mall | With Pond, Gemini | |
| PondPhuwin Rendezvous Fancon | 1 November 2025 | Union Hall, Union Mall | With Pond, Winny, Satang | |
| PondPhuwin Rendezvous Fancon | 2 November 2025 | Union Hall, Union Mall | With Pond, Fourth | |
| PondPhuwin Rendezvous Fancon in Macau | 19 February 2026 | Fisherman's Wharf Convention and Exhibition Centre | With Pond | |
| GMMTV Fan Fest 2026: Japan | 21 February 2026 | Tokyo Garden Theater, Japan | With Pond, Krist, Singto, Off, Gun, Tay, New, Boun, Prem, Joong, Dunk, Sky, Nani | |
| PondPhuwin Rendezvous Fancon in Singapore | 4 April 2026 | The Theatre at Mediacorp, Singapore | With Pond | |
| Love Out Loud Fan Fest 2026: Heart Race | 22–24 May 2026 | Impact Arena, Muang Thong Thani | With Pond, Earth, Mix, Boun, Prem, Force, Book, Joong, Dunk, Jimmy, Sea, First, Khaotung, Gemini, Fourth, Perth, Santa, William, Est, Junior, Mark, Joss, Gawin | |
| PondPhuwin Rendezvous Fancon in Hong Kong | 13 June 2026 | AXA Dreamland, Go Park | With Pond | |
| PondPhuwin Rendezvous Fancon in Vietnam | 18 July 2026 | Hoa Binh Theatre, Ho Chi Minh City | With Pond | |
| PondPhuwin Rendezvous Fancon in Taipei | 25 July 2026 | Legacy TERA, Taipei | With Pond | |
| PondPhuwin Rendezvous Fancon in Manila | 2 August 2026 | New Frontier Theater, Manila | With Pond | |
| GMMTV Fan Fest 2026: Macau | 8 August 2026 | The Venetian Cotai Expo Hall | With Pond, Boun, Prem, Joong, Dunk, Jimmy, Sea, Gemini, Fourth, Perth, Santa, Almond, Progress | |
| PondPhuwin Space Soul-dyssey Concert | 21 August 2026 | Impact Arena, Muang Thong Thani | With Pond, Perth, Santa, Est, Emi, Bonnie | |
| PondPhuwin Space Soul-dyssey Concert | 22–23 August 2026 | Impact Arena, Muang Thong Thani | With Pond, Perth, Santa, Est, Emi, Bonnie, Joong, Aou | |
| PEBACA Legacy Fam Concert | 30–31 January 2027 | BITEC LIVE | With Krist, Singto, Off, Gun, Tay, New, Nanon, Namtan, Gawin, Nani, JingJing, Prem, Sky, Bonnie | |

== Awards and nominations ==
Award nominations for Naravit Lertratkosum
| Year | Award | Category | Nominee(s) | Result | Ref. |
|---|---|---|---|---|---|
| 2021 | Nation-Building Youth Award | Preservation of Arts, Culture and Performance | —N/a | Won | |
| 2021 | Nontalee Siam | Child that Builds Reputation for the Nation | —N/a | Won | |
| 2022 | Kazz Awards 2022 | Popular Young Man of the Year | —N/a | Won | |
| 2022 | Ganesha Awards 10th | Outstanding New Actors | Fish upon the Sky | Won | |
| 2024 | Japan Expo Thailand Award 2024 | Actors Award with Pond Naravit | —N/a | Won | |
| 2024 | Line Stickers Awards 2023 | Best Couple Stickers with Pond Naravit | PondPhuwin | Won | |
| 2024 | Thailand Social AIS Gaming Awards | The Most Popular Male Game Celebrity | —N/a | Won | |
| 2024 | Feed Y Awards 2024 | Couple of the Year with Pond Naravit | We Are | Won | |
| 2024 | Best Artist Award 2024 | Popular Y Series Actor | —N/a | Won | |
| 2025 | 2025 Weibo Cultural Exchange Night | Best Promising Artist | —N/a | Won | |
| 2026 | Kazz Awards 2026 | People of the Year | —N/a | Won | |
| 2026 | Thailand Y Content Awards 2025 | Best Leading Actor | Me and Thee | Nominated | |
| 2026 | Feed x Khaosod Awards 2026 | Best Chemistry of the Year with Pond Naravit | —N/a | Nominated | |
