= Me and Thee =

2025–26 Thai television series

- Official series poster
- มีสติหน่อยคุณธีร์
- Genre: Romantic comedy; Boys' love
- Based on: มีสติหน่อยคุณธีร์ by LaWila (ลวิฬาร์)
- Screenplay by: VANGVELA.
- Directed by: Nuttapong Mongkolsawas
- Starring: Naravit Lertratkosum; Phuwin Tangsakyuen
- Opening theme: "Me and You"
- Ending theme: "Me and You"; "Everything Is for You"; "Love’s Eye View"
- Country of origin: Thailand
- Original language: Thai
- No. of seasons: 1
- No. of episodes: 10

Production
- Executive producers: Sataporn Panichraksapong; Darapa Choeysanguan
- Producer: Nuttapong Mongkolsawas
- Running time: 45–60 minutes
- Production companies: GMMTV; Gemmistry Studio

Original release
- Network: GMM 25; iQIYI; YouTube
- Release: 15 November 2025 – 17 January 2026

Related
- Peach and Me

Me and Thee (Thai: มีสติหน่อยคุณธีร์; RTGS: Mi Sati Noi Khun Thi) is a 2025 Thai boys' love television series starring Naravit Lertratkosum (Pond), Phuwin Tangsakyuen, Supha Sangaworawong (Est), Pattraphus Borattasuwan (Bonnie), Tanapon Sukumpantanasan (Perth), and Pongsapak Udompoch (Santa). The series is based on the novel of the same name, created and written by laWila (ลวิฬาร์).

Directed by Nuttapong Mongkolsawas and produced by GMMTV and Gemmistry Studio, the series was announced at the "GMMTV 2025: Riding the Wave" event on 26 November 2024. It premiered on GMM 25 and iQIYI on 15 November 2025, airing on Saturdays at 20:30 ICT and 21:30 ICT, respectively.

Following the conclusion of the series, a sequel project named Peach and Me (Thai: มีสติแล้วลูกพีช; RTGS: Mi Sati Laeo Luk Phit) was announced at the Me and Thee Fan Party on 17 January 2026.

The series also returned with the release of a vertical miniseries titled Thee and Thee (Thai: ตั้งสติหน่อยคุณธีร์; RTGS: Tang Sati Noi Khun Thi), streaming on YouTube, Instagram, and TikTok on 24 January 2026.

== Synopsis ==
Theerakit Kian Lee, nicknamed Thee (Naravit Lertratkosum), the eldest son of an ex-mafia, left his past in arms trafficking behind to launch a perfume and accessories brand called Arseni. Chaos erupts when Mr. Thee has his eyes on Aran (Pongsapak Udompoch), a model close to Peachayarat, nicknamed Peach (Phuwin Tangsakyuen), a famous freelance photographer shooting the brand's new perfume collection. Peach loves his quiet, introverted life—but it's turned upside down forever when he's roped into becoming Mr. Thee's love coach, only to be pursued by him instead in over-the-top ways, as if trying to set a new world record in wooing.

== Cast and characters ==
=== Main ===
- Naravit Lertratkosum (Pond) as Theerakit Kian Lee (Thee)
- Phuwin Tangsakyuen as Peachayarat Janekit (Peach)

=== Supporting ===
- Supha Sangaworawong (Est) as Mok
- Pattraphus Borattasuwan (Bonnie) as Panachakorn (Lookplub)
- Tanapon Sukumpantanasan (Perth) as Tawan
- Pongsapak Udompoch (Santa) as Aran Sappanakul
- Jakrapatr Kaewpanpong (William) as Kritdanai (Rome)
- Mayurin Pongpudpunth (Kik) as Thee's mother
- Piya Vimuktayon (Ex) as Thee's father
- Tachakorn Boonlupyanun (Godji) as Nuch
- Chayakorn Jutamas (JJ) as Note
- Teeradech Vitheepanich (Tee) as Tatsuya (Touch)
- Panachkorn Rueksiriaree (Stamp) as Trend
- Thishar Thurachon (Mint) as Montpreeya (Mim)
- Wiwid Bavornkiratikajorn (Tee) as Wiwid

=== Guest ===
- Chayuth Gorsurat (Titan) as Boy with Camera
- Chanakan Poonsiriwong (Boss) as Shadow of Vengeful Love actor
- Sataporn Panichraksapong (Tha) as himself
- Nuttapong Mongkolsawas (X) as himself

== Soundtrack ==
No.	Title	Writer(s)	Artist	Length
1.	"แค่คนขี้เหงา" (Me and You)	Teepakorn Kumsuree; Ittipat Wongniwatkajohn	Pond Naravit; Phuwin	5:12
2.	"ไม่มีคำว่ามากไป" (Everything Is for You)	Pure Kanin; Jeaniich	Pond Naravit	3:32
3.	"Love’s Eye View"	Amp Achariya Dulyapaiboon	Phuwin	3:24
4.	"บอกธีร์" (One Word)	Thanee Wongniwatkajorn (Gop Postcard)	Pond Naravit	3:37

== Marketing ==
The series was promoted with the Me and Thee Premiere Night event, held at the MCC Hall, The Mall Lifestore Bangkapi in Bangkok on 15 November 2025. The event featured a premiere screening of the first episode, live performances by the cast, as well as exclusive behind-the-scenes stories shared by the cast and director Nuttapong Mongkolsawas (X).

For the series finale, the Me and Thee Fan Party and the Me and Thee After Party were held at the Union Hall, Union Mall on 17 and 18 January 2026, respectively. The events featured live performances by the cast and a Q&A session with the cast and director. A sequel project named Peach and Me (Thai: มีสติแล้วลูกพีช; RTGS: Mi Sati Laeo Luk Phit) was announced at the Me and Thee Fan Party. The event also featured a screening of the final episode, allowing the fans to watch together with the cast. The screening segment was replaced with additional concert performances by the cast at the Me and Thee After Party.

== Awards and nominations ==
Award nominations for Me and Thee
Year	Award	Category	Nominee(s)	Result	Ref.
2026	Kazz Awards 2926	Most Trending on Social Media	Me and Thee	Won	
2026	Thailand Y Content Awards 2025	Best Series	Me and Thee	Nominated	
2026	Thailand Y Content Awards 2025	Best Director	Nuttapong Mongkolsawas	Nominated	
2026	Thailand Y Content Awards 2025	Best Leading Actor	Naravit Lertratkosum	Nominated	
2026	Thailand Y Content Awards 2025	Best Leading Actor	Phuwin Tangsakyuen	Nominated	
2026	Thailand Y Content Awards 2025	Best Series Script	Me and Thee	Won	
2026	Thailand Y Content Awards 2025	Best Supporting Actor	Supha Sangaworawong	Nominated	
2026	ContentAsia Awards 2026	Best LGBTQ+ Programme Made in Asia	Me and Thee	Nominated	
2026	Y Entertain Awards 2026	Best Creative Team of the Year	Me and Thee	Nominated	
2026	Y Entertain Awards 2026	Best Series OST of the Year	"Me and You"	Nominated	
2026	Praew Awards 2026	Best BL-GL Series of the Year	Me and Thee	Won	
2026	Mint Awards 2026	Entertainment Program of the Year	Me and Thee	Won	
2026	Feed x Khaosod Awards 2026	Best Chemistry of the Year	Naravit Lertratkosum and Phuwin Tangsakyuen	Nominated	
2026	Feed x Khaosod Awards 2026	Boys' Love Actor of the Year	Naravit Lertratkosum	Nominated	
2026	Feed x Khaosod Awards 2026	Top-Tier BL Series of the Year	Me and Thee	Nominated	
