= Never Let Me Go (TV series) =

2022–23 Thai television series

- Official series poster
- เพื่อนายแค่หนึ่งเดียว
- Genre: Romantic drama; Boys' Love
- Screenplay by: Kittisak Kongka; Chalermpong Udomsilp; Sedthawut Inboon; Kirati Kumsat
- Directed by: Tichakorn Phukhaotong
- Starring: Naravit Lertratkosum; Phuwin Tangsakyuen; Rasee Diskul Na Ayudhaya; Nat Sakdatorn; Tanapon Sukumpantanasan; Wachirawit Ruangwiwat
- Opening theme: Living For You
- Ending theme: Only One
- Country of origin: Thailand
- Original language: Thai
- No. of seasons: 1
- No. of episodes: 12

Production
- Executive producers: Sataporn Panichraksapong; Darapa Choeysanguan
- Producer: Noppharnach Chaiwimol
- Running time: 45 - 60 minutes
- Production companies: GMMTV; Hard Feeling Film

Original release
- Network: GMM 25; YouTube
- Release: December 13, 2022 – February 28, 2023

Related
- Our Skyy 2

Never Let Me Go (Thai: เพื่อนายแค่หนึ่งเดียว; RTGS: Phuea Nai Khae Nueng Diao) is a 2022 Thai television series, starring Naravit Lertratkosum (Pond) and Phuwin Tangsakyuen. Directed by Tichakorn Phukhaotong, produced by GMMTV and Hard Feeling Film, the series was announced at the GMMTV Borderless event on December 1, 2021. The series premiered on GMM 25 and YouTube on December 13, 2022, airing on every Tuesday at 20:30 ICT (8:30 pm). The series concluded on February 28, 2023.

== Synopsis ==
Nuengdiao is the heir to a prestigious family. His status has forced him to grow up isolated with no room for imperfection. Then his father is shot to death right in front of him. Now he and his mother's lives are in danger. The son of a loyal Kiattrakulmethee family employee, Palm is appointed to protect him from the dangers in and outside school. In his life of uncertainty, Palm's presence leads Nuengdiao to new experiences.

== Cast and characters ==
=== Main ===
- Naravit Lertratkosum (Pond) as Pannakorn Jannaloy (Palm)
- Phuwin Tangsakyuen as Nuengdiao Kiattrakulmethee

=== Supporting ===
- Rasee Wacharapolmek (Organ) as Thanya
- Nat Sakdatorn as Suphakit
- Tanapon Sukumpantanasan (Perth) as Chopper
- Wachirawit Ruangwiwat (Chimon) as Ben
- Pitisak Yaowananon (Tae) as Chanon
- Panadda Ruangwut as Mam
- Pawin Kulkaranyawich as Phum
- Wanwimol Jaenasavamethee (June) as Maggie
- Pisith Nimitsamanjit as Aun

=== Guest ===
- Supakit Tungtatsawat as Phiphop

== Soundtrack ==
Title	Artist	Ref.
"Living For You"	Phuwin	
"Only One"	Pond Naravit	
