= Love You Teacher =

2026 Thai television series

- Official series poster
- Thai: รักครูเท่าโลกเลย
- Genre: Drama; Romance
- Screenplay by: Jarupat Kannul; Methus Sirinawin; Pacharawan Chaipuwarat; Waneepan Ounphoklang
- Directed by: Jarupat Kannul
- Starring: Tanapon Sukumpantanasan; Pongsapak Udompoch
- Composer: Pure Kanin
- Country of origin: Thailand
- Original language: Thai
- No. of episodes: 10

Production
- Executive producers: Sataporn Panichraksapong; Darapa Choeysanguan; Puchong Tuntisungwaragul; Kamthorn Lorjitramnuay; Patha Thongpan
- Producers: Nuttapong Mongkolsawas; Supaporn Lertthitiverakarn
- Cinematography: Natthaphak Khanachotchaiyapong
- Editors: Masarat Panitinantapat; Chaipat Eamraksa; Mitpracha Outtaros
- Running time: 45-50 minutes
- Production companies: GMMTV; Parbdee Taweesuk

Original release
- Network: GMM 25
- Release: 14 March – 16 May 2026

Love You Teacher (Thai: รักครูเท่าโลกเลย) is a 2026 Thai romantic drama television series starring Tanapon Sukumpantanasan (Perth) and Pongsapak Udompoch (Santa).

The series premiered on March 14, 2026 on GMM25 and is available for streaming on the oneD platform and the official GMMTV channel on YouTube. It concluded on May 16th, 2026 after 10 episodes.

== Synopsis ==
Pobmek (Tanapon Sukumpantanasan) is a teacher who dislikes children but devotes his affection to his partner Solar (Pongsapak Udompoch), who is also a teacher. After a serious accident, Solar suffers neurological damage and begins to behave like a seven-year-old child. Pobmek's life changes dramatically as he must balance being a loving partner and a caregiver, facing the emotional and professional challenges of sustaining their relationship under difficult circumstances.

== Cast and characters ==
=== Main ===
- Tanapon Sukumpantanasan (Perth) as Pobmek Ekrakrak
- Pongsapak Udompoch (Santa) as Solar / Sun

=== Supporting ===
- Kay Lertsittichai as Jee
- Samantha Melanie Coates (Sammy) as Sodchuen
- Patchanok Iamsa-Ard (Berm) as Prani (Solar's mother)
- Sarocha Watittapan (Tao) as Phafan (Pobmek's mother)
- Chalita Fuangaromya (Nan) as Atsara (Sun's mother)
- Nophand Boonyai (On) as Saran (Sun's father)
- Suphakit Wongsa (Shogun) as Four

=== Guest ===
- Ploynira Hiruntaveesin (Kapook) as Pang (Ep. 5)
- Dechchart Tasilp (Sea) as Wayo (Ep. 10)
- Suvijak Piyanopharoj (Keen) as Thara (Ep. 10)

== Original soundtrack ==
The official soundtrack for Love You Teacher features:

Song	Artist(s)	Label	Ref.
"อะ-รัก-อะ-รัก (A-Rak-A-Rak)"	Perth Tanapon and Santa Pongsapak	GMMTV Records	
"ขีดเขียนเรื่องเรา (Written in Our Hearts)"	Perth Tanapon	GMMTV Records	
"พบฟ้า (My Sky)"	Santa Pongsapak	GMMTV Records	
"เสียงอากาศ (Like the Air)"	Perth Tanapon	GMMTV Records	

== Production ==
The series was announced by GMMTV in 2025 as part of its new BL and GL lineup. MintMagTH highlighted the release of the official trailer and the first promotional images of Perth and Santa, noting the anticipation surrounding the pair.

The portal Khaosod also reported on the production, emphasizing the dramatic nature of the plot and the challenge for the lead actors in portraying complex roles.

== Broadcast ==
Love You Teacher aired starting 14 March 2026, with weekly episodes on Saturdays. The series consisted of 10 episodes of approximately 45 minutes each, broadcast on GMM25, available on oneD, and released on the official GMMTV YouTube channel. It concluded on May 16th, 2026.

== Reception ==
Before its premiere, the series attracted media attention. Doramazine described the work as a mix of romance and school chaos, while Bangkok Biz News highlighted the expected cultural impact of the production.

MintMagTH emphasized the chemistry between Perth and Santa as one of the series’ strengths, and international sites such as World of BL listed Love You Teacher among the most anticipated releases of the genre.
