= Peach and Me =

2026 Thai television series

- Official series poster
- Thai: มีสติแล้วลูกพีช
- Genre: Romantic comedy; Boys' love
- Based on: The characters from มีสติหน่อยคุณธีร์ by LaWila (ลวิฬาร์)
- Screenplay by: Vangvela.
- Directed by: Nuttapong Mongkolsawas
- Starring: Naravit Lertratkosum; Phuwin Tangsakyuen
- Theme music composer: Tunwa Ketsuwan
- Ending theme: "You with Me (มีเธอดีกว่า)" by Pond, Phuwin
- Country of origin: Thailand
- Original language: Thai
- No. of episodes: 4

Production
- Executive producers: Sataporn Panichraksapong; Darapa Choeysanguan
- Producers: Nuttapong Mongkolsawas; Supaporn Lertthitiverakarn; Nichakorn Pairachwatin
- Cinematography: Panpode Boonprasert; Theeranai Wongklom
- Running time: 52–58 minutes
- Production companies: GMMTV; Gemmistry Studio

Original release
- Network: GMM 25; iQIYI; YouTube
- Release: 11 July – 1 August 2026

Related
- Me and Thee

Peach and Me (Thai: มีสติแล้วลูกพีช; RTGS: Mi Sati Laeo Luk Phit) is a Thai boys' love television series starring Naravit Lertratkosum (Pond), Phuwin Tangsakyuen, Jakrapatr Kaewpanpong (William), Supha Sangaworawong (Est), Pattraphus Borattasuwan (Bonnie), Tanapon Sukumpantanasan (Perth), Pongsapak Udompoch (Santa) and Thasorn Klinnium (Emi). The series is based on the characters from มีสติหน่อยคุณธีร์, created and written by laWila (ลวิฬาร์).

Directed by Nuttapong Mongkolsawas and produced by GMMTV and Gemmistry Studio, the series was announced at the Me and Thee Fan Party on 17 January 2026 following the conclusion of its parent series Me and Thee (Thai: มีสติหน่อยคุณธีร์; RTGS: Mi Sati Noi Khun Thi).

The series premiered on GMM 25 and iQIYI on 11 July 2026, airing on Saturdays at 20:30 ICT and 21:30 ICT, respectively.

== Synopsis ==
After the heartwarming wedding in the Arseni mansion, Thee (Naravit Lertratkosum) and Peach (Phuwin Tangsakyuen) make a strong resolution to become more sensible and composed from now on. The first thing they do is go on a honeymoon every week for six consecutive months after their marriage! This forces Peach to ask for time off to go back to work. Meanwhile, Rome (Jakrapatr Kaewpanpong) has to take over as the leader of Arseni, whilst Mr Tee has turned his focus to his work in the GMMTheeV company. What will become of Mr Thee, who is determined to be sensible in his obsessive love for Peach? And how chaotic will the next story in the Arseni mansion be?

== Cast and characters ==
=== Main ===
- Naravit Lertratkosum (Pond) as Theerakit Kian Lee (Thee)
- Phuwin Tangsakyuen as Peachayarat Janekit (Peach)

=== Supporting ===
- Jakrapatr Kaewpanpong (William) as Kritdanai Lee (Rome)
- Supha Sangaworawong (Est) as Mok
- Pattraphus Borattasuwan (Bonnie) as Panachakorn Janekit (Lookplub)
- Tanapon Sukumpantanasan (Perth) as Tawan Weeraarpakorn
- Pongsapak Udompoch (Santa) as Aran Sappanakul
- Thasorn Klinnium (Emi) as Mira
- Piya Vimuktayon (Ex) as Thee and Rome's father
- Chayuth Gorsurat (Titan) as Boy with Camera
- Natthamol Ratanarojananon as Marn
- Chulkiat Chitvarodom (Arathorn) as Mork

=== Guest ===
- Tawan Vihokratana (Tay) as himself
- Thitipoom Techaapaikhun (New) as himself
- Jitaraphol Potiwihok (Jimmy) as himself
- Tawinan Anukoolprasert (Sea) as himself
- Panachai Sriariyarungruang (Junior) as himself
- Jiruntanin Trairattanayon (Mark) as himself
- Jiratchapong Srisang (Force) as himself
- Kasidet Plookphol (Book) as himself
- Jennie Panhan as herself

== Soundtrack ==
No.	Title	Writer(s)	Artist	Length
1.	"มีเธอดีกว่า" (You with Me)	Tunwa Ketsuwan; Chayapat Thongsiri	Pond Naravit; Phuwin	2:45
2.	"มีเพียงเธอ" (My Only Focus)	Tabeazy; Jeaniich	Pond Naravit; Phuwin	4:00
