= Dangerous Romance =

2023 Thai television series

- Official series poster
- Thai: หัวใจในสายลม
- Genre: Romantic drama
- Screenplay by: Pratchaya Thavornthummarut; Pongsate Lucksameepong
- Directed by: Phadung Samajarn; Worawut Thanamatchaicharoen
- Starring: Tanapon Sukumpantanasan; Wachirawit Ruangwiwat
- Opening theme: "สายลม (Wind)" by Chimon Wachirawit
- Composer: Ratthakorn Komol
- Country of origin: Thailand
- Original language: Thai
- No. of episodes: 12

Production
- Executive producers: Sataporn Panichraksapong; Darapa Choeysanguan
- Producer: Noppharnach Chaiyahwimhon
- Cinematography: Nidchaya Boonsiripunth
- Running time: 40-45 minutes
- Production companies: GMMTV; Fillframe

Original release
- Network: GMM 25; Viu
- Release: August 18 – November 3, 2023

Dangerous Romance (Thai: หัวใจในสายลม lit. 'Heart in the Wind') is a 2023 Thai boys' love television series starring Tanapon Sukumpantanasan (Perth) and Wachirawit Ruangwiwat (Chimon).

It aired on GMM 25 on August 18, 2023, airing every Friday at 20:30 ICT, and was available for streaming on Viu at 22:30 ICT the same day. Directed by Phadung Samajarn alongside Worawut Thanamatchaicharoen and produced by GMMTV and Fillframe, it was announced at the GMMTV 2023: Diversely Yours press event on November 22, 2022.

== Synopsis ==
When Sailom (Wachirawit Ruangwiwat), a poor scholarship student, unexpectedly becomes a tutor for Kanghan (Tanapon Sukumpantanasan), a spoiled rich guy and a student he doesnt get along with, a strong friendship develops between them. Before Kanghan realises it, he develops feelings for Sailom despite their vastly different lives.

== Cast and characters ==
=== Main ===
- Tanapon Sukumpantanasan (Perth) as Krittin Sukprasert (Kanghan)
- Wachirawit Ruangwiwat (Chimon) as Sailom Homchan

=== Supporting ===
- Pahun Jiyacharoen (Marc) as Koraphat (Guy)
- Thanik Kamontharanon (Pawin) as Nawaphon (Nawa)
- Benyapa Jeenprasom (View) as Pimfah
- Wanwimol Jaenasavamethee (June) as Napdao
- Phromphiriya Thongputtaruk (Papang) as Saifah Homchan
- Phanuroj Chalermkijporntavee (Pepper) as Thanadol Vattawut (Name)
- Thanaset Suriyapornchaikul (Euro) as Auto
- Chayakorn Jutamas (JJ) as Max
- Phimkhae Kunchon Na Ayutthaya as King Sukprasert

=== Guest ===
- Natchukorn Maikan (Nong) as Kongkiat Sukprasert (Ep. 1, 3, 7)
- Savika Kanjanamas (Tuang) as Kana Sukprasert (Ep. 3)

== Original soundtrack ==
The official soundtrack for Dangerous Romance features:

Song	Artist(s)	Label	Ref.
"สายลม (Wind)"	Chimon Wachirawit	GMMTV Records	
"ไม่ต้องเป็นแฟนก็ได้ (Here with you)"	Perth Tanapon	GMMTV Records	
"ซบกันไปนานๆ (Sunset)"	Perth Tanapon and Chimon Wachirawit	GMMTV Records	
