= Fish upon the Sky =

2021 Thai television series

- Official series poster
- ปลาบนฟ้า
- Genre: Romantic comedy; Boys' love; Drama
- Created by: JittiRain
- Based on: Fish upon the Sky by JittiRain
- Written by: Sakon Wongsinwiset; Ritthikrai Kanchanawiphu; Sureechay Kaewses; Pattarawalai Wongsinwises
- Directed by: Sakon Wongsinwiset
- Starring: Phuwin Tangsakyuen; Naravit Lertratkosum
- Opening theme: ข้างๆ (RTGS: Khaang lit. Beside) by Louis Thanawin
- Ending theme: คนแบบไหน (RTGS: Kon Baeb Nai lit. What Kind of Person (Are you looking for?)) by Mix Sahaphap
- Country of origin: Thailand
- Original language: Thai
- No. of seasons: 1
- No. of episodes: 12

Production
- Producer: Noppharnach Chaiwimol
- Production location: Thailand
- Editor: Sataporn Panichraksapong
- Camera setup: Multiple camera setup
- Running time: 45-60 minutes
- Production company: GMMTV

Original release
- Network: GMM 25; LINE TV
- Release: April 9 – June 25, 2021

Fish upon the Sky (Thai: ปลาบนฟ้า; RTGS: Pla Bon Fa, also known as "Fish from the Sky, Fish upon the Sky") is a 2021 Thai boys' love television series starring Phuwin Tangsakyuen, Naravit Lertratkosum (Pond), Trai Nimtawat (Neo), and Thanawin Teeraphosukarn (Louis). The series is based on the novel of the same name created and written by JittiRain. Directed by Sakon Wongsinwiset and produced by GMMTV, it premiered on GMM 25 and LINE TV on April 9, 2021, airing Fridays at 20:30 ICT and 22:30 ICT, respectively. The series concluded on June 25, 2021.

== Synopsis ==
Pi is a nerdy second-year dental student harboring a secret crush on fellow second-year student Muang Nan of the Allied Health Sciences faculty. Faced with Nan's warm personality, charisma, and handsomeness, Pi's lack of looks and confidence lead him to feel helpless. Deciding to consult his older brother, Duean, on what he could change about himself, Pi undergoes a makeover with the help of Duean and his friends. Now a stylish, handsome student and armed with some courage, Pi finally has the guts to approach his crush. Upon doing so, he meets his love rival, Mork, a popular Medicine student who is always at Muang Nan's side.

Pi does everything to get Nan's attention over Mork, but is not lucky enough to beat him. Things begin to change when Pi begins experiencing different feelings for Mork, complicating the situation. Will he continue to try to show his feelings to Nan? Or will an unexpected love blossom with Mork?

== Cast and characters ==
=== Main ===
- Phuwin Tangsakyuen as Pattawee Panichapun (Pi)

An asocial, nerdy second-year dentistry student often bullied for his thick glasses and braces. With strong desires to win Muang Nan over, he changes his appearance to be more attractive and fit for his crush, until his feelings for Mork give him a change of heart.

- Naravit Lertratkosum (Pond) as Sutthaya Nithikornkul (Mork)

A hot, popular second-year medicine student who is Muang Nan's best friend. He has a long time secret crush on Pi, and enjoys teasing him to get his attention.

=== Supporting ===
- Trai Nimtawat (Neo) as Dollawee Panichapun (Duean)

A sharp-tongued fifth-year engineering student, the leader of the "Kitty Gang", Pi's second older brother, and Meen's love interest.

- Thanawin Teeraposukarn (Louis) as Sittha Nithikornkul (Meen)

A cute, innocent, first-year medicine student, Mork's younger brother, and Duean's love interest.

- Sahaphap Wongratch (Mix) as Muang Nan

A popular, kind second-year pharmacy student, Mork's best friend, and Pi's crush.

- Thanawin Pholcharoenrat (Winny) as Koh
- Thanaset Suriyapornchaikul (Euro) as Yok
- Chayapol Jutamas (AJ) as Jeans
- Kittiphop Sereevichayasawat (Satang) as James

=== Guest ===
- Ployshompoo Supasap (Jan) as Bam (Ep. 8-9, 11-12)
- Phatchara Tubthong (Kapook) as Teacher Namphueng (Ep. 5–7)
- Phromphiriya Thongputtaruk (Papang) as Wan (Ep. 7)
- Darina Bunchu (Nancy) as Prik Pao (Ep. 4-12)
- Thawatchai Petchsuk (Yourboy Nuree) as Kluea Kang (Ep. 4-12)
- Chotipat Surasawat (Jeng) as Phu (Ep. 9)

== Episodes ==
No.	Title	Original release date
1	"The Change // Leech upon the Sky"	9 April 2021
Following a university Valentine's Day event, Pi meets Muang Nan, who offers him an umbrella and a walk to the bus stop. Always seeing Mork and Nan together, Pi is infuriated, and dubs Mork his love rival. In an attempt to befriend Pi, Mork offers to take photos of him with Nan, not expecting the overwhelming criticism of Pi's looks when the photos were posted. Meanwhile, Duean enrolls in a life skills class he once failed four years ago in order to graduate, meeting Meen and feeling annoyed by the other constantly following him around.
2	"The Kitty Gang and Pi, The Guy on Fire // Haunted Dreams"	16 April 2021
Duean sets up a meeting with Pi and the Kitty Gang for his makeover. While at the mall, Pi encounters Mork, who attempts to apologize for the photo incident. While running behind a bus to beat Mork to Muang Nan's faculty, he faints from heat exhaustion. Duean and Meen meetup to work on their first group assignment.
3	"Oh My Gross // The Dangerous Water Bottle"	23 April 2021
Pi invites Muang Nan to an event, who rejects at first, but eventually agrees. After hearing a conspiracy involving one of the labs being haunted by ghosts who grant wishes, Pi goes to the lab late at night where he unexpectedly meets Mork. Meanwhile, Duean accidentally loses Meen's water bottle.
4	"Building a Ship // Left or Right"	30 April 2021
After the events from the night before, an online fandom was created by MorkPi shippers. Pi deals with the discomfort of having photos of him and Mork shared online. Meen mentions to Duean that he found it funny that a fifth-year student was in their class. In the midst of chaos, Pi, Duean, and the gang develop a plan to get Nan's attention away from Mork and onto Pi.
5	"Sailing the Ship // Love or Lie"	7 May 2021
Pi drives Mork home, who confesses his crush. Duean, meanwhile, continues to pretend to be a first-year dentistry student throughout his project trip with Meen. Additionally, Pi is able to convince the fanpage masters to stop following him and Mork.
6	"Getting a Vaccine // Deadly Mosquitos"	14 May 2021
Pi continues to insist that he doesn't have feelings for Mork, but even he isn't convinced. To distract himself, he confesses to Nan. After Pi returns home in the early hours of the morning, he finds his mom witnessing evidence of his crush. Meanwhile, Meen searches the name printed on Duean's lab gown in an attempt to figure out his identity.
7	"Complications // No More Gown"	21 May 2021
Following rejection from Muang Nan, Pi begins spending more time with Mork. Scared by the comfort he feels around the other, Pi becomes defensive and steps back from the friendship. Duean and Pi's eldest brother, Wan, visits home from his internship and provides some advice. At the same time, Meen and Duean fall into an argument over the confusion surrounding Duean's true identity.
8	"Social Distancing // Withdrawal Symptoms"	28 May 2021
Pi insists on winning over Nan despite Mork's continued confessions. After rejection from Pi, Mork consults the fanpage masters in a final attempt to get his attention. In a moment of anger, Pi tells Mork to stay away from him, but can't seem to stop thinking about him when he actually does it. Meanwhile, Duean finds himself missing Meen while he continued to avoid him.
9	"Placebo Effect // Start Again"	4 June 2021
Mork's friend Bam pretends to be his girlfriend to make Pi jealous and succeeding, but he fights back by inviting Muang Nan out. Nan reveals a secret to Mork that only further confuses him about his feelings. Mork explains the origins of his crush on Pi. Later, Meen and Duean reconnect.
10	"Probation // The Sweet Lucky Draw"	11 June 2021
Pi opens up and proposes a dating probation where he asks Mork to keep their relationship secret. Not completely happy with the terms, Mork accepts. Meen discovers that Duean is still the same person despite the lie.
11	"Paranoia // Changed but Still the Same"	18 June 2021
Pi goes to extreme lengths to hide his relationship with Mork from their friends. Duean encounters Mork when studying at Meen's house, and they come to an agreement on their feelings for each other's brother. While dealing with backlash from the MorkBam fandom, Pi takes out his frustration on Mork. During celebrations following passing the life skills class, Duean tries to coerce Meen into drinking.
12	"Fish upon the Sky // From Bad Luck to Beautiful Love (Finale)"	25 June 2021
Pi suffers when his old photos are leaked at Mork's birthday party. With only Mork to blame, he feels helpless. With Bam's confession and help, they eventually reconcile. After Meen's performance in the Medicine Faculty's play, Duean confesses his feelings.

== Reception ==
=== Viewership ===
In the table below, the blue numbers represent the lowest ratings and the red number represents the highest rating.

Episode	Time Slot (UTC+07:00)	Average Audience Share
1	Friday 20:30	0.163%
2	Friday 20:30	0.245%
3	Friday 20:30	0.135%
4	Friday 20:30	0.236%
5	Friday 20:30	0.159%
6	Friday 20:30	0.183%
7	Friday 20:30	0.249%
8	Friday 20:30	0.222%
9	Friday 20:30	0.235%
10	Friday 20:30	0.135%
11	Friday 20:30	0.185%
12	Friday 20:30	0.207%
Average		0.197%

== Soundtrack ==
Title	Romanized title	English title	Artist(s)	Ref.
ข้างๆ	Khang Khang	"Beside"	Thanawin Teeraphosukarn (Louis)	
คนแบบไหน	Kon Baeb Nai	"What Kind of Person (Are you looking for?)"	Sahaphap Wongratch (Mix)	

== Fan meeting ==
On August 3, 2021, two months after the series ended, GMMTV announced on its social media platforms that the series would have a live virtual fan meeting entitled "Fish upon the Sky Live Fan Meeting: A Sky Full of Fish" wherein, the actors Phuwin Tangsakyuen, Naravit Lertratkosum, Trai Nimtawat, Thanawin Teeraphosukarn, and Sahaphap Wongratch would take part. It occurred on September 4, 2021.
