= Double Savage =

2023 Thai television series

- Official series poster
- Thai: สองเดือดเลือดเดียวกัน
- Genre: Action; Drama
- Screenplay by: Siwaj Sawatmaneekul; Inthira Thanasarnsumrit
- Directed by: Preedaporn Buatoom
- Starring: Pawat Chittsawangdee; Tanapon Sukumpantanasan; Rachanun Mahawan
- Opening theme: "แค่ฝุ่น (OUT OF SIGHT)" by Ohm Pawat
- Ending theme: "เป็นเธอคนเดียว (The Only One)" by Perth Tanpon
- Composer: Nadol Lamprasert
- Country of origin: Thailand
- Original language: Thai
- No. of episodes: 12

Production
- Executive producers: Sataporn Panichraksapong; Darapa Choeysanguan
- Producer: Nuttapong Mongkolsawas
- Cinematography: Somboon Phopitakkul
- Running time: 50 minutes
- Production companies: GMMTV; Eightfinity (Note: uncredited)

Original release
- Network: GMM 25; Viu
- Release: April 17 – May 29, 2023

Double Savage (Thai: สองเดือดเลือดเดียวกัน; RTGS: Song Dueat Lueat Diao Kan, lit. 'Two Bloody Savages') is a 2023 Thai action series starring Pawat Chittsawangdee (Ohm), Tanapon Sukumpantanasan (Perth) and Rachanun Mahawan (Film). It aired on GMM 25 on April 17, 2023, airing Mondays and Tuesdays at 20:30 ICT and streaming on Viu at 22:30 ICT the same day.

Directed by Preedaporn Buatoom and produced by GMMTV and Eightfinity (Note: uncredited), it was announced during GMMTV's "Diversely Yours" event at Union Hall, Bangkok.

== Synopsis ==
The relationship between siblings Li (Zuvapit Traipornworakit), Pakorn (Pawat Chittsawangdee) and Pawin (Tanapon Sukumpantanasan) is severed by two major factors: Rungtawan (Rachanun Mahawan), the daughter of a garment factory owner in the same alley, and Asalha, or Sia Ah (Patara Eksangkul), a thief Pakorn unintentionally becomes tangled with, making him an undeniable suspect in a serious crime.

== Cast and characters ==
=== Main ===
- Pawat Chittsawangdee (Ohm) as Pakorn Beng (Korn)
- Tanapon Sukumpantanasan (Perth) as Pawin Beng (Win)
- Rachanun Mahawan (Film) as Rungtawan (Rung)

=== Supporting ===
- Sanya Kunakorn (Duu) as Ko Beng
- Zuvapit Traipornworakit (Baitoei) as Li Beng
- Patara Eksangkul (Foei) as Asalha / Sia Ah
- Chatchawit Techarukpong (Victor) as Mek
- Kittiphop Sereevichayasawat (Satang) as Pea
- Sivakorn Lertchuchot (Guy) as Kriangkrai
- Ramawadee Sirisuka (Pupae) as Phen
- Phollawat Manuprasert (Tom) as Wit
- Trakarn Punthumlerdrujee (Ton) as Kamthorn
- Narumon Phongsupan (Koy) as Duangjai

== Original soundtrack ==
The official soundtrack for Double Savage features:

Song	Artist(s)	Label	Ref.
"แค่ฝุ่น (OUT OF SIGHT)"	Ohm Pawat	GMMTV Records	
"เป็นเธอคนเดียว (The Only One)"	Perth Tanapon	GMMTV Records	
