= Supha Sangaworawong =

Thai actor and swimmer (born 2001)

- ศุภ สง่าวรวงศ์
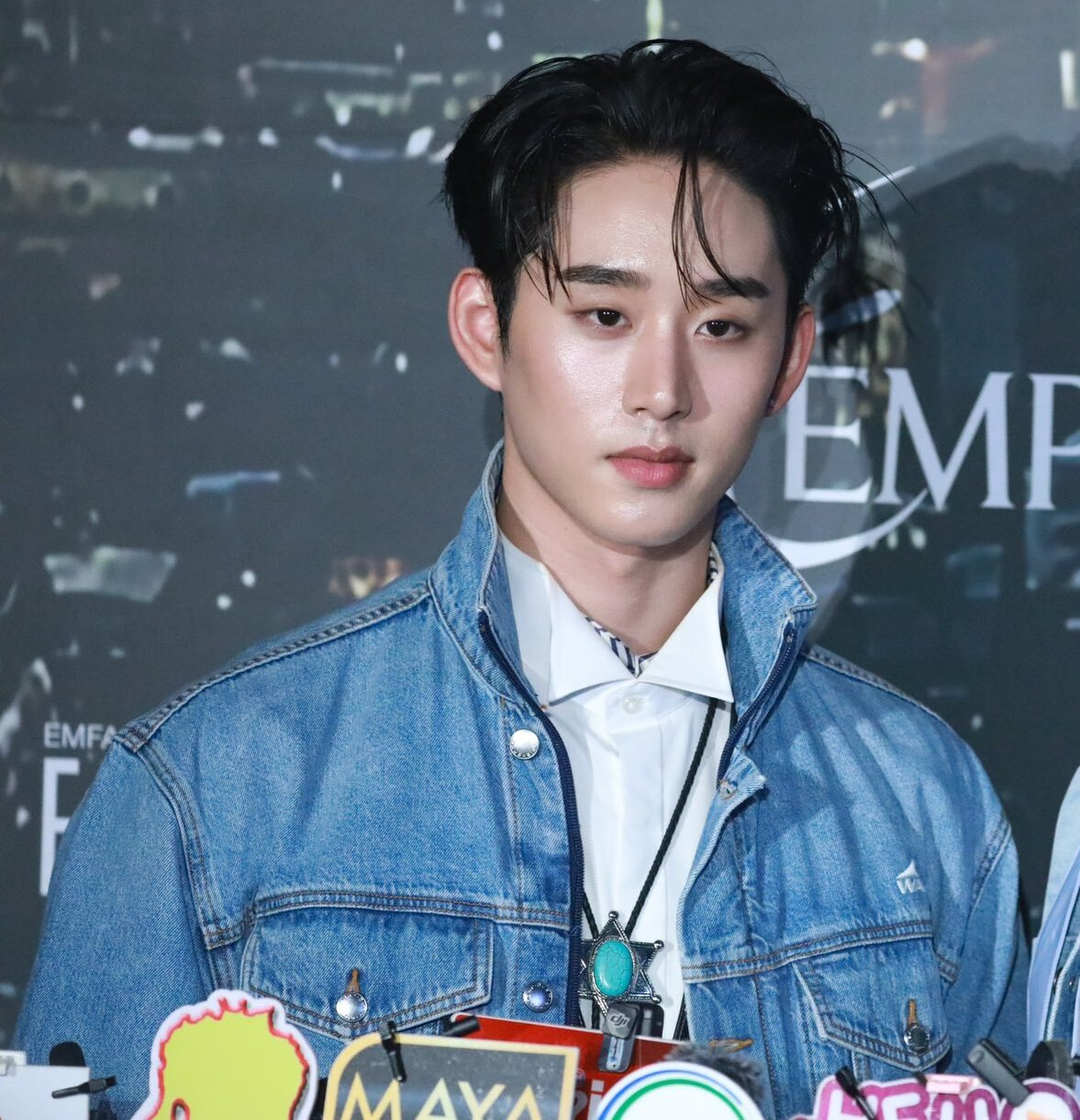
- Est in June 2025
- Born: 19 May 2001 (age 25); Bangkok, Thailand
- Other names: Est Supha, Est
- Education: Chulalongkorn University
- Occupations: Actor; Swimmer
- Years active: 2020–present
- Agent: GMMTV
- Known for: Gonhin in Love by Chance 2; Tew in High School Frenemy; Po in ThamePo: Heart That Skips a Beat; Mok in Me and Thee
- Sports career
- Height: 1.80 m (5 ft 11 in)
- Sport: Swimming
- Strokes: Butterfly, Freestyle
- Club: STA Marlins
Medal record
Men's swimming
Representing Thailand
Southeast Asian Games
Bronze medal – third place	2021 Vietnam	4×100 m freestyle

Supha Sangaworawong (Thai: ศุภ สง่าวรวงศ์; born 19 May 2001), formerly Ravipon Sangaworawong (Thai: รวิพล สง่าวรวงศ์), nicknamed Est (Thai: เอส), is a Thai actor under GMMTV and was a competitive swimmer, representing the Thai national team. He won a bronze medal at the 31st Southeast Asian Games. He starred in his first lead role as Po, alongside Jakrapatr Kaewpanpong (William) of LYKN, in ThamePo: Heart That Skips a Beat (2024).

== Early life and education ==
Supha, nicknamed Est, was born as Ravipon Sangaworawong on 19 May 2001 in Bangkok, Thailand. He began learning to swim around the age of five. He began competitive swimming at the age of seven and earned a spot on the Thai national team when he was twelve.

He attended Bangkok Christian College. In 2016, Est began attending British International School, Phuket (BISP) on a full scholarship for swimming athletes when he was in Year 10 (Matthayom 4). He shared that he wanted to be in an environment to pursue his dreams, despite barely understanding English at the time and never having travelled to a distant province alone. He shared that he attended the school for two years, during which he made a lot of progress in his swimming career and his English had greatly improved. He competed overseas with the BISP Flying Fish Team. In his second year there, he was unable to swim during the first semester due to a chronic shoulder injury. At the beginning of 2018, he returned to training after making a full recovery.

He went on to graduate from Bangkok Christian College. Est later pursued higher education at Chulalongkorn University, where he earned a degree in Public Relations from the Faculty of Communication Arts.

== Swimming career ==
At the 31st Southeast Asian Games, he helped the Thai national men's swimming team win bronze in the 4x100m freestyle relay.

At the 32nd Southeast Asian Games in 2023, Est helped Thailand break two national swimming records. In the 4×200m freestyle relay, the team finished with a time of 7 minutes 30.83 seconds. In the 4×100m freestyle relay, they finished with a time of 3 minutes 21.69 seconds.

=== Competition ===
Date	Meet	Event	Time	Ref.
15 August 2019	2019 FINA Swimming World Cup	50m freestyle	00:23.39	
16 August 2019	2019 FINA Swimming World Cup	100m freestyle	00:51.33	
25 October 2020	Thailand Age Group Swimming Championships 2020	100m freestyle	00:51.09	
25 October 2020	Thailand Age Group Swimming Championships 2020	200m freestyle	01:51.86	
6 April 2022	Thailand Age Group Swimming Championships 2022	400m freestyle	04:03.26	
14 May 2022	31st Southeast Asian Games	4×100m freestyle relay	03:24.28 (Thai record)	
7 May 2023	32nd Southeast Asian Games	4×200m freestyle relay	07:30.83 (Thai record)	
10 May 2023	32nd Southeast Asian Games	4×100m freestyle relay	03:21.69 (Thai record)	
11 May 2023	32nd Southeast Asian Games	50m butterfly	00:24.87	
11 May 2023	32nd Southeast Asian Games	50m freestyle	00:23.33	
29 September 2023	19th Asian Games	50m butterfly	00:25.17	

== Discography ==
=== Singles ===
==== Collaborations ====
Year	Title	Notes
2025	"เสียงหัวใจ (Love Echo)" (with William Jakrapatr)	—N/a
2026	"Love Feels So Fast" (with Earth, Mix, Pond, Phuwin, First, Khaotung, Joong, Dunk, Gemini, Fourth, Perth, Santa, Force, Book, Jimmy, Sea, Boun, Prem, William, Junior, Mark, Joss, Gawin)	Love Out Loud Fan Fest 2026

==== Soundtrack appearances ====
Year	Title	Album
2025	"ไม่อยากเป็นรักแรก (Your Last)"	ThamePo: Heart That Skips a Beat OST
2025	"ระหว่างทาง (Good Time)" (Cover) (Original by Bright and Thanaerng) (with William Jakrapatr)	ThamePo: Heart That Skips a Beat OST
2026	"Red Flag" (with William Jakrapatr)	You Maniac OST
2026	"ใช้ใจ (By Heart)"	You Maniac OST
2026	"อาการจะรัก (Love Symptoms)" (with William Jakrapatr)	You Maniac OST

== Filmography ==
=== Television series ===
Key
†	Denotes television productions that have not yet been released

Year	Title	Role	Network	Notes	Ref(s)
2020	Love by Chance 2: A Chance to Love	Gonhin	WeTV	Supporting role	
2023	Get Rich	Bom	Viu	Supporting role	
2023	Naughty Babe	On	One 31	Supporting role	
2024	Beauty Newbie	Note	GMM 25	Supporting role	
2024	High School Frenemy	Tew	GMM 25	Supporting role	
2024	ThamePo: Heart That Skips a Beat	"Po" Pawat Nuenganan	GMM 25	Main role	
2025	Me and Thee	Mok	GMM 25	Supporting role	
2026	Peach and Me	Mok	GMM 25	Supporting role	
2026	You Maniac	Moth	GMM 25	Main role	
TBA	Surf 'n' Love †	"Ton" Tonhon	TBA	Main role	
TBA	The Halo †	TBA	TBA	Main role	
TBA	The Jigsoul †	Thanu	TBA	Supporting role	

=== Television show ===
Year	Title	Network	Notes
2021	A Chance to Sing	AIS Play	Ep. 6–8
2022	Super Match	One 31	Ep. 10
2022	สมรภูมิดาวกีฬา Superstar Challenge	Workpoint TV	Ep. 2
2023	Talk with Toeys	GMM 25	Ep. 134
2023	ปากสว่าง Pak Sawang	Workpoint TV	13 December 2023
2024	ซานิเบาได้เบา Zani, Bao Dai Bao	One Playground	Ep. 78
2024	Arm Share	GMMTV	Ep. 152
2024	The Wall Song	Workpoint TV	Ep. 216
2024	Pepsi Friend Feast Guide with Gemini-Fourth	GMMTV	Ep. 17
2025	Who Is My Chef	Workpoint TV	Ep. 306
2025	แฉ Chae	GMM 25	6 February 2025
2025	4 ต่อ 4 Celebrity	One 31	Ep. 935
2025	The Wall Song	Workpoint TV	Ep. 232
2025	จตุรMEET ยกหยุดโลก	GMMTV	Ep. 4
2026	Trend to ร่างทอง	GMMTV	Ep. 6

== Awards and nominations ==
Award nominations for Supha Sangaworawong
Year	Award	Category	Nominee(s)	Result	Ref.
2025	Howe Awards 2025	Rising Icon Award	ThamePo: Heart That Skips a Beat	Won	
2026	Kazz Awards 2026	Hottest Artist Award	with Jakrapatr Kaewpanpong	Won	
2026	Thailand Y Content Awards 2025	Best Supporting Actor	Me and Thee	Nominated	
