= Phromphiriya Thongputtaruk =

Thai actor (born 1993)

- พรหมพิริยะ ทองพุทธรักษ์
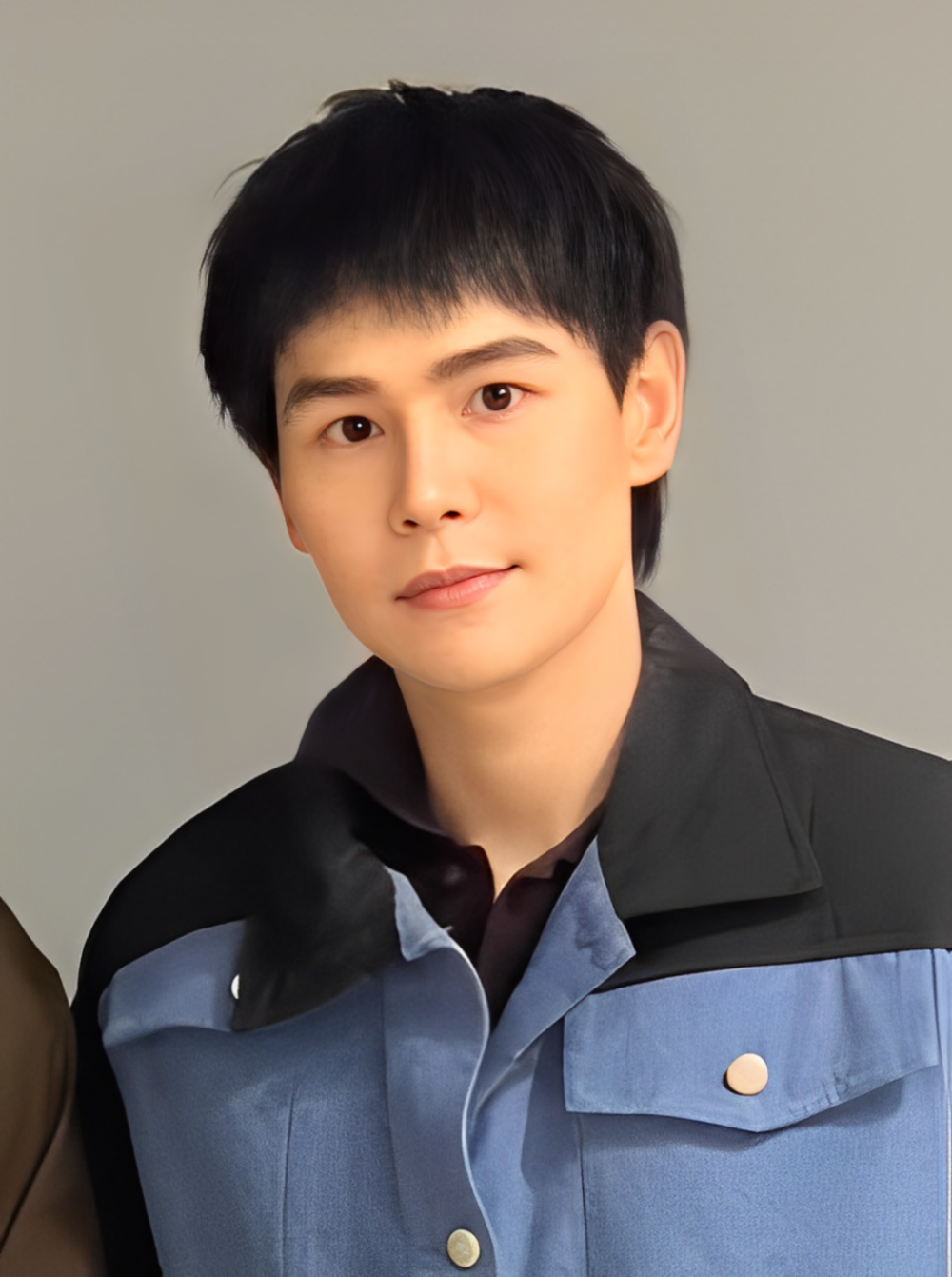
- Phromphiriya in April 2025
- Born: 18 February 1993 (age 33); Ratchaburi, Thailand
- Other name: Papang (ปาแปง)
- Occupation: Actor
- Years active: 2013–present
- Agent: GMMTV
- Known for: Gumpa in Not Me; Tan in Boys in Love
- Height: 1.85 m (6 ft 1 in)

Phromphiriya Thongputtaruk (Thai: ปาแปง พรหมพิริยะ ทองพุทธรักษ์; born 18 February 1993), known professionally as Papang, is a Thai actor. He began his career after participating in the Dutchie Boy & Girl competition in 2013 and later appeared in productions for Channel 7 before joining GMMTV.

He is known for his roles in television series including Not Me (2021), P.S. I Hate You (2022), Moonlight Chicken (2023), Dangerous Romance (2023), Only Friends (2023), Kidnap (2024), and Boys in Love (2025).

== Early life and career ==
Papang was born in Ratchaburi Province, Thailand. In 2013, he entered the entertainment industry after participating in the Dutchie Boy & Girl competition. He subsequently worked as a model and appeared in advertising campaigns before signing with Channel 7.

Among his early notable works were Phayasok (2015), Thong 10 (2016), Hak Lin Chang (2017), and Sarawat Mae Luk On (2017), the latter helping increase his recognition among Thai television audiences.

In 2020, he began appearing in productions by GMMTV, including Wake Up Ladies 2, Fish Upon the Sky, Baker Boys, Not Me, P.S. I Hate You, Moonlight Chicken, Only Friends, Dangerous Romance, Kidnap, and Boys in Love.

== Filmography ==
=== Television series ===
Key
†	Denotes television productions that have not yet been released

Year	Title	Role	Notes	Ref.
2015	Waan Jai Nai Jit Raberd	Joey	Supporting role	
2015	Phayasok	Jakrin	Supporting role	
2016	Thong 10	Kayo	Supporting role	
2017	Hak Lin Chang	Nampol	Supporting role	
2017	Koet Pen Ka	Tom	Supporting role	
2017	The Spirit of the Ruler	Techo	Supporting role	
2017	Sarawat Mae Luk On	Kokiat	Supporting role	
2018	Khun Noo Ruen Lek	Hoem	Guest role	
2018	The Big Gun	Rueangkrit	Supporting role	
2019	Suay Sorn Kom	Praphon	Supporting role	
2019	Suparburoot Jorm Jon: Maturot Lohgan	Kong	Supporting role	
2020	Por Mai Lek Tai Song Tua	Trakarn	Supporting role	
2020	Wake Up Ladies 2: Very Complicated	Shin	Supporting role	
2021	Nabi, My Stepdarling	Phraphai	Supporting role	
2021	Fish upon the Sky	Wan	Guest role	
2021	Baker Boys	Toomtam	Supporting role	
2021	Not Me	Gumpa	Supporting role	
2022	Oh, Teacher Kong	—N/a	Guest role	
2022	Revenge from the Past	Lieutenant In	Supporting role	
2022	Astrophile	Saimok	Supporting role	
2022	P.S. I Hate You	"Phu" Phureenut	Supporting role	
2023	Moonlight Chicken	Beam	Supporting role	
2023	Home School	Champ	Supporting role	
2023	The Jungle	Tee	Guest role	
2023	Only Friends	Dan	Guest role	
2023	Dangerous Romance	Saifah Homchan	Supporting role	
2023	The Bride of Naga	Sean	Supporting role	
2023	Wednesday Club	Karn	Supporting role	
2023	Cherry Magic	—N/a	Guest role	
2024	Ploy's Yearbook	Saendee	Supporting role	
2024	My Love Mix-Up!	Annop	Supporting role	
2024	Kidnap	Suea	Supporting role	
2025	Boys in Love	"Tan" Thiti Watthanachaikul	Supporting role	
2026	Cat for Cash	Hongtae	Guest role	
TBA	17th Spring †	Nathi	Supporting role	
TBA	Pit Stop †	TBA	Supporting role	
TBA	Heartbound †	TBA	Supporting role	
