= Taste (Thai TV series) =

2025 Thai television series

- Official series poster
- Thai: เด็กเจนแซ่บ
- Genre: Suspense; Teen drama
- Screenplay by: Kornkawin Chetchupayak; Naruekorn Natakul; Panich Pongpanich
- Directed by: Naruekorn Natakul; Panich Pongpanich
- Starring: Suchada Sonpan; Anthony Buisseret; Phuwin Tangsakyuen; Charlette Wasita Hermenau; Saharat Thiempan; Punnavich Sirikiatvanit; Prudtichai Ruayfupant; Yanin Opassathaworn
- Country of origin: Thailand
- Original language: Thai
- No. of episodes: 8

Production
- Executive producers: Takonkiet Viravan; Nipon Pewnen
- Running time: 60 minutes
- Production companies: The One Enterprise; Tada Entertainment; 5x6 House

Original release
- Network: One 31; oneD
- Release: 25 June – 17 July 2025

Taste (Thai: เด็กเจนแซ่บ; Dek Gen Saep, lit. The Sassy Gen Z Kids) is a 2025 Thai television series written and directed by Naruekorn Natakul and Panich Pongpanich. It stars Suchada Sonpan (Mabelz), Anthony Buisseret, Phuwin Tangsakyuen, Charlette Wasita Hermenau, Saharat Thiempan (Boom), Punnavich Sirikiatvanit (Obey), Prudtichai Ruayfupant (Sam) and Yanin Opassathaworn (Ninna).

Produced by The One Enterprise together with Tada Entertainment and 5x6 House, it aired on One 31 and oneD from June 25, 2025, to July 17, 2025.

== Synopsis ==
Bambi (Suchada Sonpan), an ambitious Generation Z teenager, craves social recognition and online visibility. Her breakthrough occurs when her custom-designed "Trash Princess" outfit goes viral. Earning an invitation to a high-profile awards ceremony, she uses the event to gain entry into elite social circles that she had only briefly crossed paths with due to her curiosity about an exclusive study group. Now backed by sudden digital fame, she draws closer to prominent on-screen couple Pure (Anthony Buisseret) and Nam Kang (Prudtichai Ruayfupant), fashionista Tokyo (Punnavich Sirikiatvanit), spoiled wealthy heiress Lukjan (Yanin Opassathaworn), and Diesel (Phuwin Tangsakyuen), the wealthy son of an influential politician.

Bambi strategically leverages these new connections to elevate her public status and surpass her peers. However, her sole focus on social climbing begins to damage her personal life. Her rise to prominence distances her from childhood friends, including Mhong (Saharat Thiempan), a trainee artist at a record label, and Dream (Charlette Wasita Hermenau), an activist fighting local injustice.

Ultimately, the progressive rift between her past life and her new environment serves as a critical turning point. Through the isolation from her lifelong companions and the volatile nature of internet clout, Bambi is forced to learn that "you have to pay a price for what you want," which becomes a crucial life lesson she does not initially realize.

== Cast and characters ==
=== Main ===
- Suchada Sonpan (Mabelz) as Bambi
- Anthony Buisseret as Patrick Collins Natakul “Pure”
- Phuwin Tangsakyuen as Danaiphat Sasipattana “Diesel”
- Charlette Wasita Hermenau as Danupha Phongsrifah "Dream"
- Saharat Thiempan (Boom) as Mhong
- Punnavich Sirikiatvanit (Obey) as Tokyo
- Prudtichai Ruayfupant (Sam) as Akira Mizuhara “Nam Kang”
- Yanin Opassathaworn (Ninna) as Lukjan Awaratsuntorn

=== Supporting ===
- Warin Treenuparb (Geng) as Jay (Tokyo's boyfriend)
- Apiwit Reardon (Rang) as Name / Boy Marx
- Siraphun Wattanajinda (Noon) as Mrs. Duangtawan (Diesel's mother)
- Nattee Kosolpisit (Bob) as Mr. Thara (Diesel's father)

=== Guest ===
- Yatichapat Hanbenjapong (Knomjean) as Pin (Bambi's friend)
- Pornthiphat Lertwuthanon (Mashii) as Model (Bambi's friend)
- Alie Blackcobra as herself
- Kanyawee Songmuang (Thanaerng) as Kimia Isarani
- Panich Pongpanich (Tung) as New (student study group tutor)
- Pariya Wongrabieb (Mam) as Bambi's mother
- Thospol Sirivivat (Tos) as Bambi's father
- Yannassma Thannitsch as Taeng (Pure & Nam Kang's manager)
- Wisarut Chantajorn (Gunner) as himself
- Danupha Kanateerakul (Milli) as herself
- Amata Piyavanich (Jum) as Dream's mother
- Saifah Tanthana as Dream's father

== Production ==
The project was officially announced as part of the OneD Original lineup during the "onePhenomenon 2025 LINEUP" event, held at the Muangthai Rachadalai Theatre on October 17, 2024. According to producer Kriangkrai Vachiratamporn (Ping), who is known for directing the hit series Hormones: The Series, development and preparation for the project spanned a two-year period prior to its public unveiling. Casting director A-tis Asanachinda (Aom) later shared via social media that the audition process attracted thousands of applicants, ultimately resulting in the selection of the eight lead actors.
