= Tanapon Sukumpantanasan =

Thai actor and singer (born 2001)

- ธนพนธ์ สุขุมพันธนาสาร
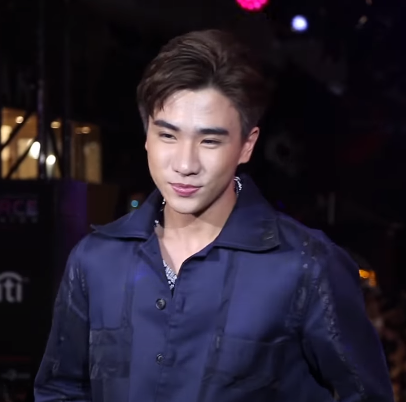
- Tanapon in June 2019
- Born: 20 March 2001 (age 25); Bangkok, Thailand
- Education: Srinakharinwirot University
- Occupations: Actor; singer
- Years active: 2017–present
- Known for: Ae in Love by Chance; Krit in The Stranded; Yotha in Perfect 10 Liners
- Height: 1.78 m (5 ft 10 in)

Tanapon Sukumpantanasan (Thai: ธนพนธ์ สุขุมพันธนาสาร; born 20 March 2001), nicknamed Perth (Thai: เพิร์ธ), is a Thai actor and singer. He gained widespread recognition for his lead role as Ae in the 2018 series Love by Chance. Following his breakout, he appeared in several productions including Reminders (2019) and The Stranded (2019). In 2023, he signed with GMMTV and was later cast in the series Double Savage (2023), and ensemble series Perfect 10 Liners (2024). He launched his solo music career with the single "Secret" in 2024 under Riser Music.

== Early life and education ==
Tanapon was born in Bangkok, Thailand and is an only child; his nickname Perth comes from a city in Australia. He's a Christian and he graduated from Saint Dominic School and earned his bachelor's degree in Film and Digital Media, major in Acting and Film Directing from the College of Social Communication Innovation, Srinakharinwirot University.

== Career ==
Tanapon made his acting debut as Breeze in the 2017 drama series Soul Call. In 2018, he became widely known for his portrayal of Ae Intouch, the male lead in the Thai BL series Love by Chance alongside Suppapong Udomkaewkanjana who played the role of Pete Pitchaya. Their performance in the series helped them gain fame and fans all over East and Southeast Asia and parts of Europe, America, and Latin America.

Perth was introduced as a member of the boy group TEMPT on January 5, 2019. In November 2, he played the role of Krit in The Stranded, produced by GMM Grammy's Bravo Studios and H2L Media Group in association with Netflix Studios, He starred in the series together with Papangkorn Lerkchaleampote, Chutawut Phatrakampol and Oabnithi Wiwattanawarang.

In 2020, Tanapon relived his character as Ae Intouch on Love by Chance 2: A Chance to Love, this time in a supporting role.

On 13 July 2020, Tanapon left his management AttractorTH along with Rathavit Kijworalak and Napat na Ranong due to an "internal matter," insisting there were no hard feelings behind the decision; he then worked as a freelancer for a year.

In 2020 he joined a 10-member collaboration boy group under MBO called Boyfriends, which consist of him, Kanawut Traipipattanapong, Noppakao Dechaphatthanakun, Talay Sanguandikul, Rueangrit Siriphanit, Sapol Assawamunkong, Sittichok Pueakpoolpol, Gavin Duval, Nontanun Anchuleepradit and Wanarat Ratsameerat. He was paired up with Rueangrit Siriphanit and they released their first single, "Hello Doctor" (อาการงี้), in September 2020.

In October 2020, it was announced that he would star in the movie Tell the World I Love You with Suradet Piniwat. It was supposed to be released on Valentines Day 2021, but was later moved back to 27 January 2022.

On 4 April 2022, Tanapon was announced as the newest GMMTV's talent through its official Instagram and Twitter.

== Filmography ==
=== Film ===
Year	Title	Role	Notes	Ref.
2019	Love: Must Fight		Main role	
2022	Tell the World I Love You	Boang	Main role	

=== Television ===
Key
†	Denotes television productions that have not yet been released

Year	Title	Role	Notes	Ref.
2017	Please... Seiyng Reiyk Wiyyan (Soul Call)	Breeze	Supporting role	
2018	Love by Chance	Ae Intouch	Main role	
2019	Reminders	Pin	Main role	
2019	Kao Waan Hai Noo Pen Sai Lub	Sia Ha (young)	Guest role	
2019	Until We Meet Again	Somkrit	Guest role	
2019	The Stranded	Krit Kheetikawong	Main role	
2019	2Wish	Pin	Guest role	
2020	Love by Chance 2: A Chance to Love	Ae Intouch	Main role	
2021	Seven Project	Beam	Main role	
2022	My Coach	Jon	Main role	
2022	Vice Versa	Mek	Guest role	
2022	Never Let Me Go	Chopper	Supporting role	
2023	Dangerous Romance	"Kanghan" Krittin Sukprasert	Main role	
2023	Double Savage	"Win" Pawin	Main role	
2024	Peaceful Property	Best	Guest role	
2024	Perfect 10 Liners	Yotha	Main role	
2025	Me and Thee	Tawan Weeraarpakorn	Supporting role	
2026	Love You Teacher	Pobmek Ekrakrak	Main role	
2026	Peach and Me	Tawan Weeraarpakorn	Supporting role	
2026	Scarlet Heart Ullavee	Kong Tai, Prince Buriratana	Main role	
TBA	Heartbound †	Gun DeGustro	Main role	
TBA	High & Low: Born to Be High †	Way	TBA	
TBA	The Halo †	Tham	Main role	

=== Music videos ===
Year	Song title	English title	Artist	Notes
2018	"ไม่ว่าอะไร"	Wish This Love	Arunpong Chaiwinit	Love by Chance OST
2018	"หวัง"	Hope	Sirintip Hanpradit	Love by Chance OST
2018	"ขอ"	Wish	Boy Sompob	Love by Chance OST
2018	"นา นา นา"	Na Na Na	Boy Sompob	Love by Chance OST
2020	"บังเอิญรัก"		Perth, Title, Mark, Mean & Plan	Love by Chance: A Chance to Love OST
2021	"เหตุผลที่ฉันไม่กลับมา"	The Reason I Didn't Come Back	Tanapon Sukumpantanasan	Tell the World I Love You OST
2023	"Wind"	Wind	Chimon Wachirawit	Dangerous Romance OST

== Discography ==
=== Singles ===
==== As lead artist ====
Year	Title	Ref.
2024	"Secret"	
2025	"ด้านชา (Numb)" (feat. Paper Planes)	
2026	"Sorry Not Sorry"	

==== Collaborations ====
Year	Title	Artist	Notes	Ref.
2019	"ใช่...ใช่ไหม (Tell Me Is This Love)"	Tempt		
2020	"โชว์เพลง (Be with Me Tonight)"	Tempt		
2020	"อาการงี้ (Hello Doctor)"	Ritz x Perth		
2023	"Hugs"	Off, Gun, Tay, New, Pond, Phuwin, Gemini, Fourth, Perth, Chimon		
2024	"You're My Treasure"	Earth, Mix, Pond, Phuwin, First, Khaotung, Joong, Dunk, Gemini, Fourth, Perth, Chimon, Force, Book, Jimmy, Sea, Winny, Satang	Love Out Loud Fan Fest 2024	
2024	"Over the Moon (คืนนี้แค่มีเรา)"	Perth, Chimon		
2026	"Love Feels So Fast"	Earth, Mix, Pond, Phuwin, First, Khaotung, Joong, Dunk, Gemini, Fourth, Santa, Force, Book, Jimmy, Sea, Boun, Prem, William, Est, Junior, Mark, Joss, Gawin	Love Out Loud Fan Fest 2026	

==== Soundtrack appearances ====
Year	Title	Artist	Album	Ref.
2020	"บังเอิญรัก"	Perth, Title, Mark, Mean & Plan	Love by Chance 2: A Chance to Love OST	
2021	"เหตุผลที่ฉันไม่กลับมา (The Reason I Didn't Come Back)"	Perth Tanapon	Tell the World I Love You OST	
2023	"ซบกันไปนานๆ (Sunset)"	Perth Tanapon, Chimon Wachirawit	Dangerous Romance OST	
2023	"ไม่ต้องเป็นแฟนก็ได้ (Here with You)"	Perth Tanapon	Dangerous Romance OST	
2023	"เป็นเธอคนเดียว (The Only One)"	Perth Tanapon	Double Savage OST	
2024	"วันนี้ (Perfect)"	Force, Book, Perth, Santa, Junior, Mark	Perfect 10 Liners OST	
2024	"แค่เธอเท่านั้น (No One Else)"	Perth Tanapon, Santa Pongsapak	Perfect 10 Liners OST	
2026	"อะ-รัก-อะ-รัก (A-Rak-A-Rak)"	Perth Tanapon, Santa Pongsapak	Love You Teacher OST	
2026	"ขีดเขียนเรื่องเรา (Written in Our Hearts)"	Perth Tanapon	Love You Teacher OST	
2026	"เสียงอากาศ (Like the Air)"	Perth Tanapon	Love You Teacher OST	

== Awards and nominations ==
Award nominations for Tanapon Sukumpantanasan
Year	Award	Category	Nominee(s)	Result	Ref.
2019	2nd Line TV Awards	Best Couple	Love by Chance (with Saint Suppapong)	Won	
2019	2nd Line TV Awards	Best Kiss Scene	Love by Chance (with Saint Suppapong)	Won	
2019	13th Kazz Awards	Young Boys of the Year	—N/a	Won	
2020	16th Kom Chad Luek Award	Popular Vote	Love by Chance	Won	
2020	16th Kom Chad Luek Award	Most Popular TV Series – Drama	Love by Chance	Nominated	
2020	14th Kazz Awards	Popular Male Teenage	—N/a	Won	
2020	14th Kazz Awards	Popular Vote	—N/a	Nominated	
2020	6th Maya Awards	Charming Boy	—N/a	Won	
2025	Feed x Khaosod Awards	Couple of the Year	Perfect 10 Liners (with Santa Pongsapak)	Won	
2026	Kazz Awards 2026	Shining Star of the Year	—N/a	Won	
2026	31st Asian Television Awards	Best Music Video	"ด้านชา (Numb)"	Nominated	
