= The Missing Sunshine =

Thai upcoming television series

- Official pilot poster
- Thai: ดั่งแสงที่หายไป
- Genre: Romance; Drama
- Starring: Naravit Lertratkosum; Phuwin Tangsakyuen
- Country of origin: Thailand
- Original language: Thai

Production
- Production companies: GMMTV; Cholumpi Production

The Missing Sunshine (Thai: ดั่งแสงที่หายไป; RTGS: Dang Saeng Thi Hai Pai, lit. 'Like a Lost Light') is an upcoming Thai boys' love television series starring Naravit Lertratkosum (Pond) and Phuwin Tangsakyuen.

Produced by GMMTV and Cholumpi Production, it was announced on the third and final day of the "PondPhuwin Space Soul-dyssey Concert", on August 23, 2026 after the cancellation of the previous project both of the main leads were signed to.

== Synopsis ==
A solitary operative (Naravit Lertratkosum) who sees life in grayscale is assigned to surveil a corrupt executive (Phuwin Tangsakyuen), only to discover this person brings color to his world, forcing them to choose between duty and an unexpected connection.

== Cast and characters ==
=== Main ===
- Naravit Lertratkosum (Pond) as Noom
- Phuwin Tangsakyuen as Navi (New) / Nas
