= Pawat Chittsawangdee =

Thai actor (born 2000)

- ภวัต จิตต์สว่างดี
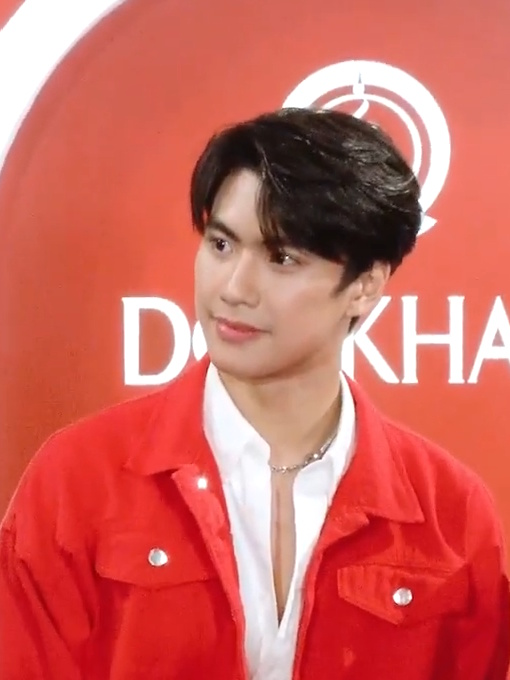
- Pawat in 2022
- Born: 22 March 2000 (age 26); Bangkok, Thailand
- Other name: Ohm
- Education: Srinakharinwirot University; College of Social Communication Innovation
- Occupations: Actor, Racer
- Years active: 2016–present
- Agent: GMMTV
- Known for: Pat in Bad Buddy; Frame in Make It Right; Thun in He's Coming to Me; Dew in Dew
- Height: 1.86 m (6 ft 1 in)

Pawat Chittsawangdee (Thai: ภวัต จิตต์สว่างดี; born 22 March 2000), nicknamed Ohm (Thai: โอม), is a Thai actor. He is known for his main roles as Frame in MCOT HD's Make It Right (2016), adult Thun in GMMTV's He's Coming to Me (2019), as the title character in the film Dew (2019), Khet in The Shipper (2020), Pat in Bad Buddy (2021), and Min in Kidnap (2024).

== Early life and education ==
Pawat was born in Bangkok, Thailand. He completed his secondary education at Assumption College. He received a bachelor's degree in cinema and digital media under the College of Social Communication Innovation of Srinakharinwirot University.

== Career ==
In 2016, Pawat started in the entertainment industry with his first role as Frame in MCOT HD's television series Make It Right and later reprised his role in its second season in 2017. He went on to star in several dramas such as Siam 13 Hours, Bangkok Ghost Stories: Rescuer and Beauty Boy: The Series. Before becoming part of GMMTV, he was initially invited by its managing director, Sataporn Panichraksapong, to audition for an upcoming series. He then accepted the invitation and successfully landed the role of an adult Thun in He's Coming to Me, where he was paired with Prachaya Ruangroj (Singto).

He starred in the Thai romantic movie Dew where he played the leading role of Dew. In 2021, Chittsawangdee was paired with Korapat Kirdpan (Nanon) in Bad Buddy. He and Korapat had a fan meeting in the Philippines in January 2023. Their partnership officially ended in July 2024 after GMMTV released a statement that they had mutually decided to cease their work as a duo to focus on individual career paths.

In May 2024, GMMTV announced it was taking legal action against the company UGO Nutrition for terminating Ohm Pawat's contract as a presenter without a valid reason.

In March 2025, GMMTV announced that Ohm and Leng Thanapol U-Sinlaparat had ended their professional partnership by mutual agreement, leading to them being replaced in the series Only Friends: Dream On and MU-TE-LUV.

Ohm publicly spoke about his growing passion for motorsports, revealing he had been practicing motorcycle riding regularly and hoped to one day compete professionally. Later Ohm ventured into motorsports, getting involved with the NEXZTER BRIC Superbike racing series to help attract a new generation of fans. His first appearance was at the series' pre-season test.

== Bullying scandal ==
=== Exposure ===
After the release of Korean TV Series The Glory (which focused on bullying and the revenge by victim), several celebrities worldwide, especially in Asia, were accused of bullying in the past. For Pawat's case, one of the netizens (who were also one of Pawat's bullying victims) reveal in her post that she indeed, is one of his bullying victim, and she also stated that she witness him bullying the other friend, who was also being an autistic.

=== Acceptance and apology ===
Later, he admit it that he was a bully, but he stated that he already say sorry to the victim during school days. He also said in his apology statement that his bullying was just "mischievous" act.

=== Public reactions ===
After the apology, many people (especially who aren't his fans) sees that the apology wasn't sincerely enough (due to his justification of bullying as "mischievous act"), but his fans sees that his apology was enough. Many netizens also say that he should apologize to the victims.

== Filmography ==
=== Film ===
Year	Title	Role	Notes	Ref.
2018	Cross-Dimension Love		Guest role	
2019	Dew	Dew	Main role	
2023	My Precious	Dong	Supporting role	

=== Television ===
Key
†	Denotes television productions that have not yet been released

Year	Title	Role	Notes	Ref.
2016	Make It Right	Frame	Main role	
2016	Haunted	Ter	Main role (Ep.11)	
2016	War of High School	Pound	Main role	
2017	Make It Right 2	Frame	Main role	
2017	Siam 13 Hours	Ick	Main role	
2017	Enough		Main role	
2018	Bangkok Ghost Stories: Rescuer	Frame	Main role	
2018	Beauty Boy: The Series	Pound	Support role	
2019	He's Coming to Me	"Thun" Thunyakorn	Main role	
2019	Make It Live: On The Beach	Frame	Guest role	
2019	Blacklist	Highlight	Main role	
2020	The Shipper	"Khet" Khemachat Dhamrong-rattanaroj	Main role	
2021	An Eye for an Eye	Nawa	Support role	
2021	Bad Buddy	"Pat" Napat Jindapat	Main role	
2022	Vice Versa	"Tess" Thattawa / Talay	Support role	
2022	10 Years Ticket	Phukhao Siraphuchaya	Main role	
2023	Our Skyy 2	"Pat" Napat Jindapat	Main role	
2023	Double Savage	"Korn" Pakorn Beng	Main role	
2023	Wednesday Club	Kong	Main role	
2024	Kidnap	"Min" Athikhun Monkolsit	Main role	
2024	My Cruel Cutie	Sun	Main role	
2026	Gunshot †	Arnut	Support role	
TBA	Surf 'n' Love †	Porsche	Main role	
TBA	Police Chap Khamoi †	TBA	Main role	
TBA	Vamp Eternal Destiny †	TBA	TBA	
TBA	Pit Stop †	Ray	Main role	

=== Music video appearances ===
Year	Title	Artist	Role	Ref.
2021	จักรวาลที่ฉันต้องการมีแค่เธอ (My Universe is You); Jak Gra Wan Tee Chan Tong Gan Mee Kae Tur	Korapat Kirdpan	Himself	
2021	แค่เพื่อนมั้ง (Just Friend?); Khae Phuean Mang	Korapat Kirdpan	Pat	
2021	จะไม่บอกใครละกันว่าเธอชอบฉันก่อน (Secret); Cha Mai Bok Khrai La Kan Wa Thoe Chop Chan Kon	Kacha Nontanun	Pat	
2022	เพลงที่เพิ่งเขียนจบ (OUR SONG); Pleng Tee Perng Kiian Jop	Korapat Kirdpan	Pat	

=== Web show ===
Year	Title	Role	Note	Ref.
2022	Ohm Nanon UpVel	Host	with Nanon Korapat	

== Discography ==
=== Soundtrack appearances ===
Year	Title	Soundtrack	Label	Ref.
2016	"ความรักทั้งเจ็ด" (with Make It Right cast)	Make It Right OST	GMM Grammy	
2022	"แค่คิดก็ผิดแล้ว (Unlovable)"	10 Years Ticket OST	GMMTV Records	
2023	"แค่ฝุ่น (OUT OF SIGHT)"	Double Savage OST	GMMTV Records	
2023	"คำเดียว (My Word)"	Our Skyy 2 OST	GMMTV Records	
2024	"รักพา (Love Leads)" (with Leng Thanaphon)	Kidnap OST	GMMTV Records	
2024	"แข็งใจ (Hard-Hearted)"	Kidnap OST	GMMTV Records	

== Awards and nominations ==
Key
†	Indicates non-competitive categories

Year	Award	Category	Nominated work	Result	Ref.
2019	Thailand Master Youth	Artists, Performers, Singers & Entertainers †	—N/a	Won	
2020	LINE TV Awards	Best Dramatic Scene	He's Coming to Me (shared with Prachaya Ruangroj)	Won	
2020	28th Bangkok Critics Assembly Awards	Best Supporting Actor	Dew	Won	
2021	Kazz Awards	Num Wai Sai	Bad Buddy Series	Nominated	
2022	Kazz Awards	Attractive Young Man of the Year	Bad Buddy Series	Won	
2022	Kazz Awards	Best Scene with Korapat Kirdpan	Bad Buddy Series	Won	
2022	Kazz Awards	Best Actor	Bad Buddy Series	Nominated	
2022	Kazz Awards	Best Couple with Korapat Kirdpan	Bad Buddy Series	Won	
2024	28th Asian Television Awards	Best Actor in a Leading Role	10 Years Ticket	Nominated	
2025	Japan Expo Thailand Award	Japan Expo Artist Award		Won	
2025	Mint Awards 2025	Best of Mint Six Pack (Special Award)		Nominated	
