= Mint Magazine =

Thai entertainment and fashion magazine

- Categories: Entertainment, fashion and lifestyle
- Founded: 2020
- Country: Thailand
- Based in: Bangkok
- Language: Thai
- Website: www.mintmagth.com

Mint Magazine is a Thai entertainment, fashion and lifestyle magazine founded in 2020 and based in Bangkok. The publication produces interviews, fashion editorials, photo shoots and feature stories on artists in the Thai entertainment industry, while also organizing events and awards dedicated to pop culture. The magazine has a print circulation of over 50,000 copies per issue and is published six times a year.

== History ==
The magazine was co-founded in 2020 by Grit Jirakiertivadhana (Gong), the founder of Millennials Choice (Mchoice) and creative director of Hive Salon, and Soraya Vattanajiamwong, former deputy editor of Vogue Thailand and former editor-in-chief of Elle Thailand. According to its founders, the publication adopted a concept based on bringing together artists, fans and brands through editorial content, live experiences and special events.

According to a study conducted by the Faculty of Journalism and Mass Communication at Thammasat University, the publication adopts an editorial model based on the concept of Fan-based Economy, integrating print media, digital platforms and events to connect artists, brands and audiences.

In 2025, the magazine celebrated its fifth anniversary with the Mint 5 Years of Freshness exhibition, held at Siam Center in Bangkok. The exhibition featured historical magazine covers, exclusive photographs, special content and activities for readers, as well as charitable initiatives.

== Mint Awards ==
Since 2022, the magazine has organized the Mint Awards, an annual awards ceremony dedicated to the Thai entertainment industry. The event recognizes actors, musicians, television series and other entertainment productions through both public voting categories and editorial awards selected by the magazine's editorial team. The event brings together artists from different Thai entertainment companies and features musical performances, fashion shows and collaborations with international fashion brands.

The 2025 edition was held at True Icon Hall, Iconsiam, Bangkok, and featured performances by 4Eve, Proxie, Perses, BUS, DICE and other guests from the Thai entertainment industry.

== See also ==
- GMMTV
