= Pongsapak Udompoch =

Thai actor and singer (born 2003)

- พงศภัค อุดมโภชน์
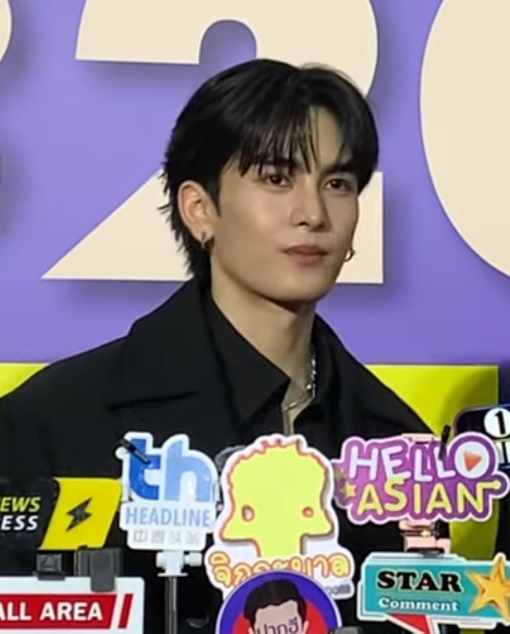
- Pongsapak in November 2024
- Born: 3 November 2003 (age 23); Thailand
- Other name: Santa (แซนต้า)
- Education: Rangsit University
- Occupations: Actor; singer; dancer
- Years active: 2019–present
- Agents: Studio Wabi Sabi (2019–2024); GMMTV (2024–present)
- Known for: Gun in Perfect 10 Liners; Aran in Me and Thee; Solar/Sun in Love You Teacher

Pongsapak Udompoch (Thai: พงศภัค อุดมโภชน์; born 5 November 2003), nicknamed Santa (Thai: แซนต้า). He is an actor under Thai television production agent GMMTV. He then gained widespread recognition for his role as Gun in the 2024 series Perfect 10 Liners. In December 2024, he later became a member of the Thai pop boy band JASP.ER under Riser Music. Before debuting in the group, he had been a K-pop trainee in South Korea for six months, participating in the 2023 survival show Fantasy Boys.

== Early life and education ==
Pongsapak was born in Thailand. Initially passionate about technology, he dreamed of working as a programmer. However, after being inspired by BTS, he developed aspirations of pursuing a career as an idol. His ambitions as an artist solidified after participating in contests such as To Be Number One Idol 9 in 2019 and Fantasy Boys in 2023. Devoted to dance, he has consistently posted dance videos on social media platforms such as X and TikTok.

He received his high school diploma from Triampat and pursued a post-secondary degree in Digital Marketing Communication and Branding at Rangsit University. While in college, he was involved in school events, such as serving as the MC for the student orientation ceremony.

== Filmography ==
=== Television series ===
Key
†	Denotes television productions that have not yet been released

Year	Title	Role	Notes	Network	Ref.
2021	7 Project	"Sun" Tawan Watcharagul	Main role	iQIYI	
2022	War of Y	Santa	Guest role	AIS Play	
2022	My Only 12%	Cake	Main role	iQIYI	
2022	Between Us	"Wiew" Phuri Wanichkanchanakul	Support role	iQIYI	
2024	Perfect 10 Liners	"Gun" Gunyukhol	Main role	GMM 25	
2025	Me and Thee	Aran Sappanakul	Support role	GMM 25	
2026	Love You Teacher	Solar / Sun	Main role	GMM 25	
2026	Peach and Me	Aran Sappanakul	Support role	GMM 25	
TBA	Heartbound †	"Ai" Aiyara Singhamekha	Main role	TBA	
TBA	The Halo †	Nat	Main role	TBA	

=== Variety shows ===
Year	Title	Network	Notes	Ref.
2023	Fantasy Boys	MBC	Contestant	
2025	เป๊ปซี่ มิตรชวนกิน Guide Season 2	YouTube	Guest (EP.3)	
2025	Bestie Tasty Season 2	YouTube	Guest (EP.2)	
2025	IDOL ENERGY	YouTube	Guest (EP.1-3)	

== Discography ==
=== Soundtrack appearances ===
Year	Title	Soundtrack	Label	Ref.
2024	"วันนี้ (Perfect)" with Force Jiratchapong, Book Kasidet, Perth Tanapon, Junior Panachai and Mark Jiruntanin	Perfect 10 Liners OST	GMMTV Records	
2024	"แค่เธอเท่านั้น (No One Else)" with Perth Tanapon	Perfect 10 Liners OST	GMMTV Records	
2026	"อะ-รัก-อะ-รัก (A-Rak-A-Rak)" with Perth Tanapon	Love You Teacher OST	GMMTV Records	
2026	"พบฟ้า (My Sky)"	Love You Teacher OST	GMMTV Records	

=== Singles ===
Year	Title	Label	Notes	Ref.
2025	"อยู่ไม่ไหว（Be with Me)" with Perth Tanapon	GMMTV Records	Credited for lyrics and melody	
2026	"Love Feels So Fast"	GMMTV Records	LOL Fan Fest 2026	

=== Composer credits ===
Year	Song title	Label	Ref.
2025	"อยู่ไม่ไหว (Be with Me)"	GMMTV Records	

== Live performances ==
=== Fan meeting ===
Year	Date	Event	Country/Region	Location	Ref.
2024	October 27, 2024	Perfect 10 Liners First Date	Thailand	Siam Pavalai Royal Grand Theater	
2025	January 26, 2025	Perfect 10 Liners Mid Term	Thailand	Siam Pavalai Royal Grand Theater	
2025	April 6, 2025	Perfect 10 Liners Bye Nior Fan Party	Thailand	MCC Hall	
2025	April 7, 2025	Perfect 10 Liners Bye Nior After Party	Thailand	MCC Hall	
2025	May 24, 2025	Perfect 10 Liners Fan Meeting	Japan	Ebisu the Garden Hall	
2025	August 23, 2025	Perfect 10 Liners Fan Meeting	Philippines	Samsung Hall	
2025	August 30, 2025	Perth Santa JIB Dream Fan Meeting	Italy	Hilton Rome Airport Hotel	
2025	October 11, 2025	Perfect 10 Liners Fan Meeting	Vietnam	Hoa Binh District 10 Cultural Center	
2026	January 17, 2026 January 18, 2026	Me and Thee Fan Party	Thailand	Union Hall	
2026	January 31, 2026	Santa 1st Fan Sign in Shanghai	China	Shanghai	
2026	March 14, 2026	Love You Teacher Lesson One	Thailand	Bhiraj Hall	
2026	March 22, 2026	Santa Fan Sign in Tianjin	China	Tianjin	
2026	May 16, 2026	Love You Teacher Final EP. Fan Meeting	Thailand	MCC Hall	

=== Concerts ===
Year	Date	Event	Country/Region	Location	Ref.
2025	May 17, 2025 May 18, 2025	Love Out Loud Fan Fest 2025	Thailand	Impact Arena	
2025	July 19, 2025 July 20, 2025	Perth Santa Time Stopper Fancon	Thailand	Union Hall	
2026	March 7, 2026	Perth Santa Time Stopper in Vietnam	Vietnam	Hoa Binh Theater	
2026	April 19, 2026	Perth Santa Time Stopper in Taipei	Taiwan	Zepp New Taipei	
2026	May 22, 2026 May 23, 2026 May 24, 2026	Love Out Loud Fan Fest 2026: Heart Race	Thailand	Impact Arena	
2026	July 18, 2026 July 19, 2026	PerthSanta Devil's Kiss Concert	Thailand	Paragon Hall	

=== Other ===
Year	Date	Event	Country/Region	Location	Ref.
2024	December 21, 2024	GMMTV Starlympic	Thailand	Impact Arena	
2025	April 10, 2025	Iconsiam Thaiconic Songkran Celebration	Thailand	Iconsiam	
2025	June 21, 2025	Thai Festival in Yangon	Myanmar	Novotel Yangon Max	
2025	December 20, 2025	GMMTV Starlympic	Thailand	Impact Arena	
2026	April 12, 2026	SUPERFLUID 2026 Songkran Music Festival	Thailand	King Power Rangnam	

== Awards and nominations ==
Year	Award	Nominated Work	Category	Result	Ref.
2024	Thailand Y Content Awards	Perfect 10 Liners	Rising Star of the Year	Won	
2025	Kazz Awards	Perfect 10 Liners	Couple Of The Year with Perth Tanapon	Nominated	
2025	Kazz Awards	Perfect 10 Liners	Rising Male Of The Year	Nominated	
2025	Bangkok Pride Awards	—N/a	Pride Popular of Y Series Star with Perth Tanapon	Nominated	
2025	Feed x Khaosod Awards	—N/a	Couple Of The Year with Perth Tanapon	Won	
2025	Y Entertain Awards	—N/a	Rising Star Couple with Perth Tanapon	Nominated	
2025	Maya TV Awards	—N/a	Male Couple of the Year Award with Perth Tanapon	Nominated	
2025	Maya TV Awards	—N/a	Rising Star Male of the Year	Nominated	
2025	Howe Awards	—N/a	Howe Shining Male Award	Nominated	
2025	Howe Awards	—N/a	Howe The Best Couple Award with Perth Tanapon	Nominated	
2026	Kazz Awards	—N/a	Youth Choice of the Year	Won	
