= Sataporn Panichraksapong =

Thai business executive (born 1967)

- สถาพร พานิชรักษาพงศ์
- Born: 27 December 1967 (age 58)
- Education: Thammasat University
- Occupation: Managing Director of GMMTV
- Years active: 2007–present

Sataporn Panichraksapong (Thai: สถาพร พานิชรักษาพงศ์; also known as Tha (Thai: ถา), born 27 December 1967) is a Thai business executive in Thai entertainment conglomerate GMM Grammy. He is currently serving as the managing director of GMMTV.

== Education ==
Sataporn graduated with a bachelor's degree in journalism and mass communications (cinematography) from Thammasat University. In 2014, he completed the Director Certification Program (DCP) from the Thai Institute of Directors Association.

== Career ==
In January 2007, Sataporn, who was serving as deputy managing director of GMMTV, became its new managing director after Saithip Montrikul na Ayudhaya left the company to manage GMM Media Public Co., Ltd.

He became the chief executive officer of GMM 25 on 16 September 2018 replacing Saithip Montrikul na Ayudhaya.
