= Teeradech Vitheepanich =

Thai actor (born 2001)

- ธีรเดช วิถีพานิชย์
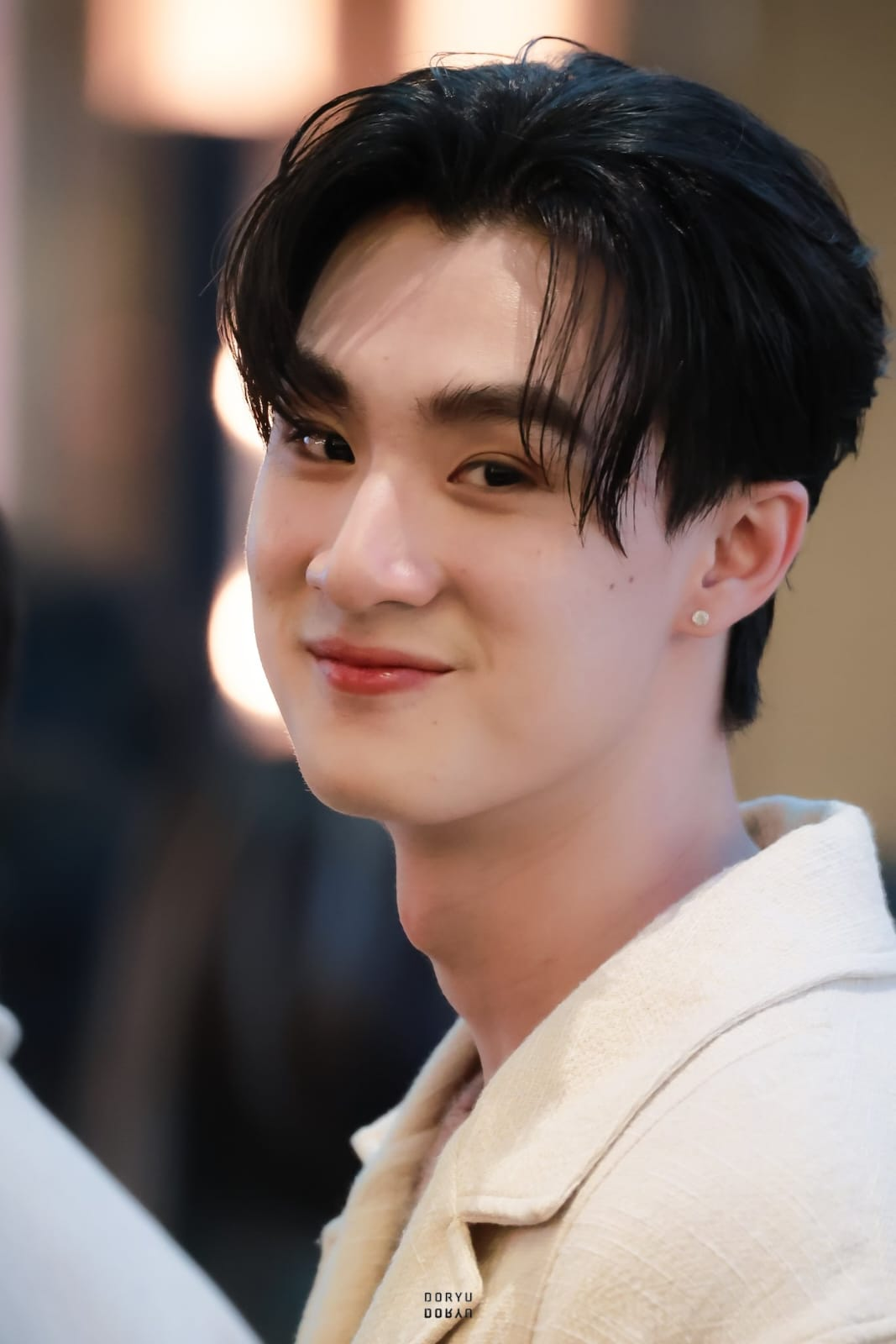
- Teeradech in May 2025
- Born: 20 March 2001 (age 25); Thailand
- Other name: Tee (ธี)
- Education: Srinakharinwirot University
- Occupation: Actor
- Years active: 2023–present
- Agents: Add Me I (2020-2022); GMMTV (2023-present)
- Known for: Phat in Mr. Kill
- Height: 1.88 m (6 ft 2 in)

Teeradech Vitheepanich (Thai: ธีรเดช วิถีพานิชย์; born 2001), nicknamed Tee (Thai: ธี), is a Thai actor known for his roles in We Are (2024), Perfect 10 Liners (2024), Me and Thee (2025) and Mr. Kill (2026).

== Early life and education ==
Teeradech was born on 20 March 2001 in Thailand. He graduated from Srinakharinwirot University's College of Social Communication Innovation in 2024, majoring in Cyber Business Management.

== Career ==
He was first introduced to the entertainment scene on 10 August 2022, as a trainee of GMM Academy under the group name "Team Popstar", a training academy and entertainment agency under GMM Grammy. He signed on as a GMMTV artist in 2023.

In 2020, he began appearing as supporting roles in productions by GMMTV, including appearances in Only Friends, We Are, Kidnap, Perfect 10 Liners and Me and Thee. His first main role in a series came alongside acting partner Jirawat Sutivanichsak in the 2026 mystery thriller series Mr. Kill.

== Filmography ==
=== Television series ===
Key
†	Denotes television productions that have not yet been released

Year	Title	Role	Network	Notes	Ref.
2023	Only Friends	Plug	GMM 25	Supporting role	
2024	We Are	Mick	GMM 25	Supporting role	
2024	Kidnap	Third	GMM 25	Supporting role	
2024	Perfect 10 Liners	Ben	GMM 25	Supporting role	
2025	Break Up Service	Kong	GMM 25	Guest role	
2025	I Love 'A Lot Of' You	Chin	GMM 25	Guest role	
2025	That Summer	Victor	One 31	Guest role	
2025	Me and Thee	"Touch" Shohei Tatsuya	GMM 25	Supporting role	
2026	Girl from Nowhere: The Reset	New	One 31	Supporting role	
2026	Mr. Kill	"Phat" Yotsaphat Traikanawut	GMM 25	Main role	
TBA	Blue Print †	TBA	TBA	Main role	

=== Music video appearances ===
Year	Title	Artist	Label	Ref.
2021	"Ja Glub Pai Dee Gub Khao Gor Bok (จะกลับไปดีกับเขาก็บอก)"	Serious Bacon	Boxx Music	
2022	"Yod Nuk Sueb (ยอดนักสืบ)"	I Hate Monday	White Music	
2026	"What's Wrong? (ผิดมากไหม)"	Nanon Korapat	Riser Music	
2026	"Friend List"	Felizz	Riser Music	

== Discography ==
=== Singles ===
==== Soundtrack appearances ====
Year	Title	Soundtrack	Label	Ref.
2026	"โลกขาวดำ (True Color)" with Dew Jirawat	Mr. Kill OST	GMMTV Records	
2026	"เสียงของเงา (Our Name)"	Mr. Kill OST	GMMTV Records	

== Fan meetings ==
Title	Date	Venue	Notes	Ref.
Mr. Kill: The First Page	7 July 2026	MCC Hall, Floor 3, The Mall Lifestore Bangkapi	With Mr. Kill cast	
Mr. Kill Final EP. Fan Meeting	8 September 2026	CentralWorld Pulse Hall, CentralWorld	With Mr. Kill cast	
GMMTV Fanival: Happy Family	12 October 2026	Union Hall, Union Mall	With Dew	
Dew-Tee Fan Meeting in Taipei	27 December 2026	Zepp New Taipei, New Taipei	With Dew	
GMMTV Fan Day 41 in Tokyo	14 February 2027	New Pier Hall, Tokyo	With Dew	

== Concerts ==
Title	Date(s)	Venue	Notes	Ref.
We Are Forever Fancon	16–17 August 2024	True Icon Hall, Iconsiam	With Pond, Phuwin, Winny, Satang, Aou, Boom, Marc, Poon, Pepper, JJ	
GMMTV Starlympics 2025	20 December 2025	Impact Arena, Muang Thong Thani	GMMTV Artists	
Dew-Tee Secret Area Fancon	7 November 2026	Union Hall, Union Mall	With Dew, Win	
Dew-Tee Secret Area Fancon	8 November 2026	Union Hall, Union Mall	With Dew, Winny	

== Awards and nominations ==
Year	Award	Category	Work	Result	Ref.
2026	Maya Awards 2026	Outstanding Couple of the year with Dew Jirawat	Mr. Kill	Won	
2026	14th Howe Awards	Rising Icon	—N/a	Won	
