= How to Survive My CEO =

Upcoming Thai television series

- Official series pilot poster
- พัตลมอย่าแย่
- Genre: Romantic Comedy; Boy's Love
- Based on: Phatlom Ya Yae (พัตลมอย่าแย่) by kunredbeb (คุณเรดเบ๊บ)
- Directed by: Natthanon Kheeddee
- Starring: Archen Aydin; Natachai Boonprasert
- Country of origin: Thailand
- Original language: Thai

Production
- Producer: GMMTV
- Production location: Thailand
- Production companies: GMMTV; Studio WabiSabi

How to Survive My CEO (Thai: พัตลมอย่าแย่; RTGS: Phatlom Ya Yae) is an upcoming Thai romantic comedy television series, starring Archen Aydin (Joong) and Natachai Boonprasert (Dunk). The series, directed by Natthanon Kheeddee and produced by GMMTV together with Studio WabiSabi, was announced at the GMMTV 2026: Magic Vibes Maximised event on November 25, 2025. It is an adaptation of a web novel. This show is cancelled.

== Cast and characters ==
=== Main ===
- Archen Aydin (Joong) as Patlom
- Natachai Boonprasert (Dunk) as Pafon

=== Supporting ===
- Rapeepong Supatineekitdecha (Lego) as Pheem
- Chayatorn Trairattanapradit (Tui) as Itt
- Samantha Melanie Coates (Sammy) as Blink
- Chayakorn Jutamas (JJ)
- Chayapol Jutamas (AJ)
