= Thanawin Pholcharoenrat =

Thai actor (born 2000)

- ธนวินท์ ผลเจริญรัตน์
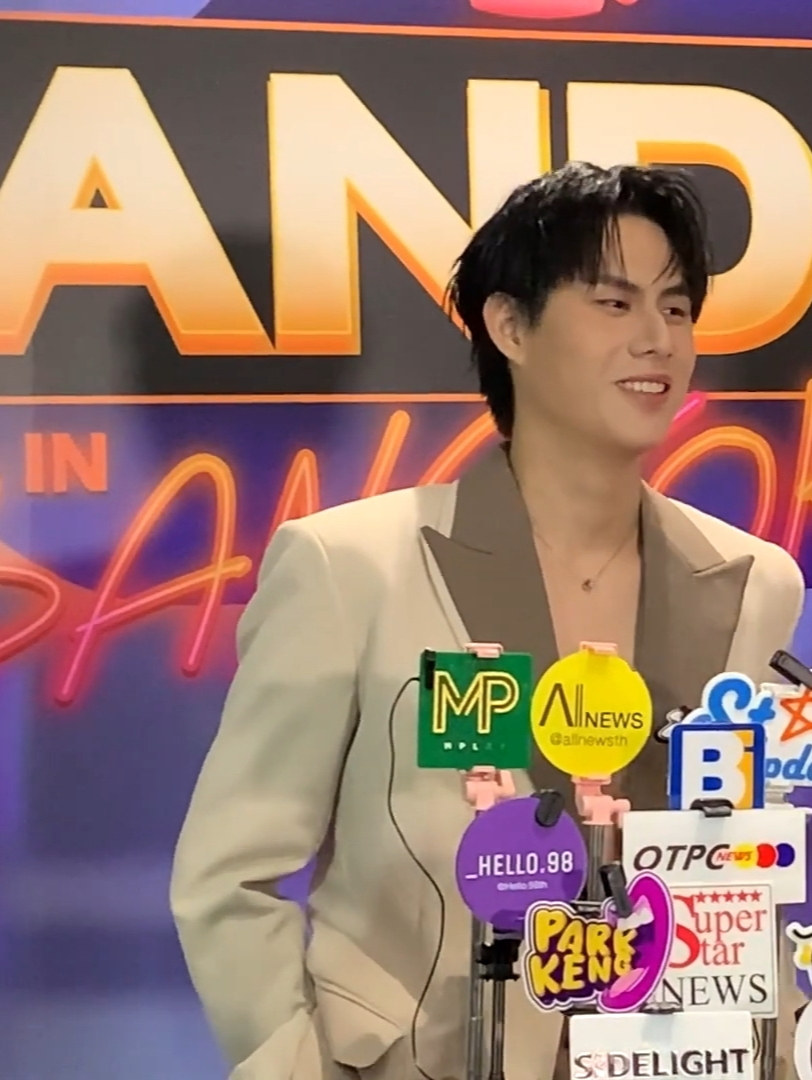
- Thanawin in December 2024
- Born: 12 November 2000 (age 25); Thailand
- Other name: Winny (วินนี่)
- Education: Bangkok Christian College
- Alma mater: University of the Thai Chamber of Commerce
- Occupation: Actor
- Years active: 2021–present
- Agent: GMMTV
- Known for: Win in My School President; Q in We Are; Lava in That Summer
- Height: 1.8 m (5 ft 11 in)

Thanawin Pholcharoenrat (Thai: ธนวินท์ ผลเจริญรัตน์; born 2000), nicknamed Winny (Thai: วินนี่), is a Thai actor known for his roles in My School President (2022), We Are (2024) and That Summer (2025).

== Early life and education ==
After completing his secondary education at Bangkok Christian College, he graduated from the University of the Thai Chamber of Commerce with a bachelor's degree in communications in December 2025, after dropping out of a Law course at Thammasat University Faculty of Law.

== Career ==
His first significant was Win, a member of the fictional band Chinchilla, in My School President. In this series he was paired with Kittiphop Sereevichayasawat (Satang), who portrayed Sound. This on-screen pairing became a fan-favorite “ship,” contributing substantially to his growing popularity. He also participated in several songs featured on the series' original soundtrack. In 2023, GMMTV launched a fan meeting tour for My School President cast members, including him and Winny, with events held across Vietnam, Singapore, the Philippines, Taiwan and Cambodia. Following the success of My School President, he reprised his role as Win in Our Skyy 2 (2023), as well as his role as Kay from the duology series Star in My Mind and Sky in Your Heart.

On October 17, during the "GMMTV 2024 Up & Above Part 1" event, it was announced that he would star as Q, the main character in the series We Are, alongside his My School President costar Kittiphop Sereevichayasawat (Satang). After he played in We Are, he made a guest appearance as Win in episode 11 of My Love Mix-Up! (2024), reprising his character from My School President. The 2024 GMMTV Fandom Characters project, he and Satang created Samruay, a mascot representing both of them.

He then starred in his first lead role alongside Kittiphop Sereevichayasawat (Satang) in romance drama series That Summer. On March 3, 2026, GMMTV announced he and Satang had mutually agreed to cease their work as a pair.

Currently, his next scheduled appearances will be in the upcoming boys' love series Gunshot, and the Thai expansion of the High&Low universe, High & Low: Born to Be High.

On October 22, 2026, he was revealed to be the newest host for the webshow GMMTV Live House.

== Filmography ==
=== Television series ===
Key
†	Denotes television productions that have not yet been released

Year	Title	Role	Network	Notes	Ref.
2021	Fish upon the Sky	Koh	GMM 25	Supporting role	
2022	Star in My Mind	Nay	GMM 25	Supporting role	
2022	Sky in Your Heart	Nay	GMM 25	Guest role	
2022	My School President	Win	GMM 25	Supporting role	
2023	Midnight Museum	It	GMM 25	Guest role	
2023	Our Skyy 2: KluenDao	Nay	GMM 25	Supporting role	
2023	Our Skyy 2: TinGun	Win	GMM 25	Supporting role	
2024	We Are	"Q" Nirandon Yodsavathin	GMM 25	Main role	
2024	My Love Mix-Up!	Win	GMM 25	Guest role	
2024	High School Frenemy	Jom	GMM 25	Guest role	
2025	That Summer	"Lava" Tiwakorn Rapeepong	One 31	Main role	
2026	Cat for Cash	Pug	GMM 25	Guest role	
2026	Gunshot †	Sapsin	GMM 25	Supporting role	
TBA	High & Low: Born to Be High †	Nemo	TBA	Supporting role	
TBA	Pineapple Leaf Blade †	TBA	TBA	Supporting role	

=== Music video appearances ===
Year	Title	Artist	Soundtrack	Label	Ref.
2022	"อีกนิด (Come Closer)"	Ford Allan	My School President OST	GMMTV Records	
2023	"เพื่อนเล่นไม่เล่นเพื่อน (Just Being Friendly)" cover	Fourth Nattawat, Satang Kittiphop and Ford Allan	My School President OST	GMMTV Records	
2023	"ถ้าไม่ใช่ (No One Else Like Me)"	Satang Kittiphop	My School President OST	GMMTV Records	
2023	"พูดได้ไหม (Let Me Tell You)"	Fourth Nattawat	My School President OST	GMMTV Records	
2023	"รักษา (Healing)"	Gemini Norawit, Fourth Nattawat, Satang Kittiphop and Ford Allan	My School President OST	GMMTV Records	
2023	"ก้อนหินกับดวงดาว (Rock & Star)"	Fourth Nattawat	My School President OST	GMMTV Records	
2023	"แค่ครั้งเดียว (Once Upon a Time)"	Gemini Norawit, Fourth Nattawat, Satang Kittiphop and Ford Allan	My School President OST	GMMTV Records	
2024	"นานตลอดกาล (We Are Forever)"	Phuwin Tangsakyuen	We Are OST	GMMTV Records	
2025	"ดาวหลงทาง (Sea and Star)"	Satang Kittiphop	That Summer OST	GMMTV Records	

== Discography ==
=== Singles ===
==== Collaborations ====
Year	Title	Label	Ref.
2024	"You're My Treasure" with Satang, Earth, Mix, Pond, Phuwin, Force, Book, Joong, Dunk, Jimmy, Sea, First, Khaotung, Gemini, Fourth, Perth, Chimon	GMMTV Records	
2024	"ขั้วตรงข้าม (OPPOSITE)" with Satang Kittiphop	GMMTV Records	

==== Soundtracks ====
Year	Title	Soundtrack	Label	Ref.
2022	"ไหล่เธอ (You've Got Ma Back)" with Fourth, Satang and Ford	My School President OST	GMMTV Records	
2022	"ฟัง (Listen)" with Fourth, Satang and Ford ft. Lookwa Pijika	My School President OST	GMMTV Records	
2022	"ง้อว (Smile Please)" with Gemini, Fourth, Satang, Mark, Ford, Prom and Captain	My School President OST	GMMTV Records	
2023	"รักคู่ขนาน (Multi-Love)" with Gemini, Fourth, Satang, Mark and Ford	Our Skyy 2 OST	GMMTV Records	
2024	"เรามีเรา (WE ARE)" with Pond, Phuwin, Satang, Aou, Boom, Marc and Poon	We Are OST	GMMTV Records	
2024	"คิดถึงฉันใช่ป่ะ (Missing Me?)" with Satang Kittiphop	We Are OST	GMMTV Records	
2025	"สายลมกับเกลียวคลื่น (Wind and Wave)"	That Summer OST	GMMTV Records	
2025	"ใจฉันมีแค่เธอ (Belong With You)" with Satang Kittiphop	That Summer OST	GMMTV Records	

== Fanmeetings ==
Title	Date	Venue	Notes	Ref.
Star in My Mind Final EP. FanMeeting	May 27, 2022	Siam Pavalai Royal Grand Theater, Siam Paragon	With Star in My Mind Cast	
My School President: Prom Night Live on Stage	March 18–19, 2023	Union Hall, Union Mall	With My School President Cast	
GMMTV FanDay 4 in Osaka	May 7, 2023	Dojima River Forum	With My School President Cast	
My School President FanMeeting in Cambodia	May 27–28, 2023	AEON Hall	With My School President Cast	
WinnySatang FanMeeting in Vietnam	June 18, 2023	White Palace Covention Centre	With Satang	
My School President FanMeeting in Taipei	July 8, 2023	Zepp New Taipei	With My School President Cast	
My School President FanMeeting in Singapore	July 1, 2023	Capitol Theatre	With My School President Cast	
My School President FanMeeting in Manila	August 5, 2023	University Theater of UP Diliman	With My School President Cast	
My School President FanMeeting in Hong Kong	August 12, 2023	AsiaWorld-Summit, AsiaWorld-Expo	With My School President Cast	
GMMTV FanDay 6 in Seoul	August 20, 2023	Hansung University	With Satang	
WinnySatang FanMeeting in Taipei	October 28, 2023	WESTAR	With Satang	
My School President FanMeeting in Vietnam	November 12, 2023	Hoa Binh Theater	With My School President Cast	
My School President FanMeeting in Tokyo	November 23, 2023	Belle Salle Shinjuku Grand Hall	With My School President Cast	
My School President FanMeeting in Seoul	November 25, 2023	Woonjung Green Campus Grand Hall, Sungshin Women's University	With My School President Cast	
My School President FanMeeting in Macau	December 3, 2023	H853 Fun Factory	With My School President Cast	
GMMTV FanDay 12 in Japan	June 30, 2024	Zepp Namba	With Satang	
We Are FOREVER FanMeeting in Tokyo	October 17–18, 2024	Tachikawa Stage Garden	With We Are Cast	
We Are FOREVER FanMeeting in Hong Kong	October 20, 2024	The Londoner, Macau	With We Are Cast	
We Are FOREVER FanMeeting in Taipei	November 2, 2024	Legacy TERA	With We Are Cast	
GMMTV FanDay in Bangkok 2024	November 30, 2024	Union Hall, Union Mall	With Satang	
That Summer: The First Sunshine	September 19, 2025	6th Fl. Siam Paragon, Siam Pavalai, Paragon Cineplex	With That Summer Cast	
That Summer Final EP. FanMeeting	November 21, 2025	6th Fl. Siam Paragon, Siam Pavalai, Paragon Cineplex	With That Summer Cast	
Naiin Book Fair 2026	January 24, 2026	Samyan Mitrtown, 5th Fl.	With Satang	

== Concerts ==
Title	Date	Venue	Notes	Ref.
Love Out Loud Fan Fest 2024: The Love Pirates	May 18–19, 2024	Impact Arena	With Satang, Earth, Mix, Pond, Phuwin, Force, Book, Joong, Dunk, Jimmy, Sea, First, Khaotung, Gemini, Fourth, Perth, Chimon	
We Are FOREVER Fancon	August 16–17, 2024	True Icon Hall	With Satang, Pond, Phuwin, Aou, Boom, Marc, Poon, Pepper, Tee, JJ	
We Are FOREVER Fancon in Vietnam	September 19, 2024	Hoa Binh Theater	With Satang, Pond, Phuwin, Aou, Boom, Marc, Poon	
Love Out Loud Fan Fest 2025: Lovemosphere	May 17–18, 2025	Impact Arena	With Satang, Earth, Mix, Boun, Prem, Pond, Phuwin, Force, Book, Joong, Dunk, Jimmy, Sea, First, Khaotung, Gemini, Fourth, Perth, Santa, William, Est	
GeminiFourth A.W.A.K.E. Concert	August 30–31, 2025	Impact Arena	With Gemini, Fourth, Satang, Mark, Ford, Prom, Captain, Aun	
PondPhuwin Rendezvous Fancon	November 1, 2025	Union Hall	With Pond, Phuwin, Satang	
Dew-Tee Secret Area Fancon	November 8, 2026	Union Hall	With Dew, Tee	
