= Dare You to Death =

2025–26 Thai television series

- Official series poster
- ไขคดีเป็นเห็นคดีตาย
- Genre: Thriller; Mystery
- Based on: Dare You to Death ไขคดีเป็นเห็นคดีตาย by MTRD.S
- Directed by: Jade Bunyoprakarn
- Starring: Archen Aydin; Natachai Boonprasert
- Opening theme: "Final Interval" by Guy Copeland
- Ending theme: "แรงมาแรงกลับไม่โกง (Dare You To Love)" by Joong Archen, Dunk Natachai (Ep. 1-6, 9) "ค้างคา (Doubt)" by Joong Archen (Ep. 7) "ไม่ค่อยได้พูด (Wordless)" by Dunk Natachai (Ep. 8)
- Country of origin: Thailand
- Original language: Thai
- No. of episodes: 10

Production
- Executive producer: Sataporn Panichraksapong Darapa Choeysanguan
- Producers: Ekkasit Trakulkasemsuk; Sakon Tiacharoen; Nuttapong Mongkolsawas; Supaporn Lertthitiverakarn
- Production location: Thailand
- Running time: 42-48 minutes
- Production companies: GMMTV; Keng Kwang Kang Waisai

Original release
- Network: GMM 25; Netflix
- Release: December 18, 2025 – February 26, 2026

Dare You to Death (Thai: ไขคดีเป็นเห็นคดีตาย; RTGS: Khai Khadi Pen Hen Khadi Tai) is a Thai mystery and thriller television series, starring Archen Aydin (Joong) and Natachai Boonprasert (Dunk). The series, directed by Jade Bunyoprakarn and produced by GMMTV together with Keng Kwang Kang Waisai, was announced at the GMMTV 2025: Riding the Wave event on November 26, 2024. It premiered on GMM 25 on December 18, 2025, airing on Thursdays at 20:30 ICT. The series is also available in the uncut version on Netflix Thursdays at 21:30 ICT.

== Synopsis ==
When Puifai (Pathitta Pornchumroenrut) dies after a night of partying with friends, new police Inspector Kamin (Natachai Boonprasert) and Captain Jade (Archen Aydin), adversaries, join forces to find out the truth behind her death. The case, however, proves not to be as simple as it first appears.

== Cast and characters ==
=== Main ===
- Archen Aydin (Joong) as Jaruwat Chotisuntrakul (Jade)
- Natachai Boonprasert (Dunk) as Kamin Kananon

=== Supporting ===
- Thipakorn Thitathan (Ohm) as Jirawit Chotisuntrakul (Jay) (Jade's younger brother)
- Pathitta Pornchumroenrut (Pahn) as Puifai
- Wachirawit Ruangwiwat (Chimon) as Champ
- Wanwimol Jaenasavamethee (June) as Cherreen
- Harit Cheewagaroon (Sing) as Phut
- Teepakorn Kwanboon (Prom) as Time
- Peerakan Teawsuwan (Ashi) as Pharit Kritniwat (Tonkla)
- Preeyaphat Lawsuwansiri (Earn) as Pannita Thomanat (Bell)
- Ochiris Suwanacheep (Aungpao) as Tar
- Jeeratch Wongpian (Fluke) as Thaenkhun Iriyasasanakul (Forensic physician)
- Samantha Melanie Coates (Sammy) as Emiran Kiattikhongrak (Mirin) (Forensic investigator)
- Natarit Worakornlertsith (Marc) as Ken (Police officer)
- Tharatorn Jantharaworakarn (Boom) as Yuki/YU (Detective from Special Investigation Unit)
- Thanaboon Kiatniran (Aou) as Lee (Detective from Special Investigation Unit)
- Jirapat Uttamanan (Khunnote) as Lee Seon Jae
- Dusit Witooteerasan (Tae) as Don (Commander)

== Episodes ==
No.	Title	Original release date
1	"EPISODE 1"	December 18, 2025
After a student dies mysteriously at a college party, Captain Jade investigates but instantly clashes with the newly transferred Inspector Kamin.
2	"EPISODE 2"	December 25, 2025
Puifai's autopsy confirms she was poisoned, which prompts Kamin and Jade to investigate her friends. Tar, another student, receives an ominous challenge.
3	"EPISODE 3"	January 8, 2026
Jade and Kamin believe truth-or-dare challenges are a pretext for revenge killings. Chereen comes clean about the night of Puifai's murder. Tonkla is hiding dark secrets and cracks are appearing in Jay's loyalty to his friend.
4	"EPISODE 4"	January 15, 2026
Jade and Kamin's relationship grows complicated as the hunt for the killer intensifies. Another gruesome murder among the Avengers provides a dangerous new lead.
5	"EPISODE 5"	January 22, 2026
Kamin discovers that the murdered Avengers all have something in common. But before they can make an arrest, Jet is forced into a fight for his life.
6	"EPISODE 6"	January 29, 2026
Suspicious flare when Jade finds out that his younger brother was the only witness to one of the murders but Kamin has an idea to put them back on track.
7	"EPISODE 7"	February 5, 2026
Kamin and Jet find the links between victims to narrow the suspects — but before they can break the case, the killer sends a new truth-or-dare challenge.
8	"EPISODE 8"	February 12, 2026
With only three Avengers left alive, suspicion is cast on each of them in the murder case. To protect Jade, Kamin lets him handle the case alone.
9	"EPISODE 9"	February 19, 2026
Even while suspended, Kamin continues to help Jade find the murderer. But time wears thin when the killers lures the remaining Avengers to a farm.
10	"EPISODE 10"	February 26, 2026
Kamin and Jade race to save the last three Avengers, who are forced into a deadly final game. But the killer refuses to let the plan be ruined.

== Original soundtrack ==
Dare You To Death Original Soundtrack
No.	Title	Artist	Length
1.	"Dare You To Love (แรงมาแรงกลับไม่โกง)"	Archen Aydin, Natachai Boonprasert	3:10
2.	"Doubt (ค้างคา)"	Archen Aydin	3:33
3.	"Wordless (ไม่ค่อยได้พูด)"	Natachai Boonprasert	3:22

== Production ==
On November 29, 2024, the series was in the pre-production phase, per the Parbdee official X account.

On August 4, 2025, the original director, Waasuthep Keppetch (Waa), announced on X that he would no longer direct the series due to timeline conflicts. The project was also transferred to a different production company, although the replacement director was not immediately identified. On the same day, the main cast confirmed that they had attended a basic acting workshop and participated in an introduction session with the new production crew.

On August 10, the official social media account posted a black-and-white photo from the pictorial set, later confirmed as the fitting day for the series. Several additional fitting photos released by the actors and production crew were circulated online and received notable attention, helping to bring further spotlight to the series.

On August 19, the official social media account posted a video of the main leads training in boxing as part of their role preparation. Later that day, GMMTV released a statement regarding cast changes for three of its series: A Dog and a Plane, My Romance Scammer, and Dare You to Death. The announcement confirmed that Wachirawit Ruangwiwat (Chimon) would replace Sattabut Laedeke (Drake) in the cast, and Jeeratch Wongpian (Fluke) would also join the series.

On August 23, filming for the series officially began. It was confirmed through the official social media channels that the director is Jade Bunyoprakarn (Dome), under the Keng Kwang Waisai production house, by a series of pictures posted.

The filming was concluded on November 15. A video of the cast with the filming crew was posted along with the caption, "Q1 23/08/2025 - Q25 15/11/2025 #DareYouToDeathQ25 ปิดกล้องงงงงงงงงงง 🔥".

== Release ==
A teaser was released on various GMMTV social media platforms that the official trailer will be released at 5PM on November 27, 2025. The series will air on December 18, 2025, on GMM 25 at 20:30 PM ICT. The series is available on Netflix worldwide at 21:30 PM ICT on the same day.

The production revealed that the series will air EP 3 as scheduled, which is on Christmas Day, but take a break on the New Year. The series will resume airing on January 8, 2026, for EP 3.

== Fan Meeting ==
Year	Title	Date	Venue	Ref.
2025	Dare You to Death: The Case Open	December 18, 2025	Siam Pavalai Theatre, Paragon Cineplex, Siam Paragon	
2026	Dare You to Death FINAL EP. FAN MEETING	February 26, 2026	CentralwOrld PULSE Hall, 7th fl. CentralWorld	
