= Tharatorn Jantharaworakarn =

Thai actor and singer (born 1998)

- ธราธร จันทรวรกาญจน์
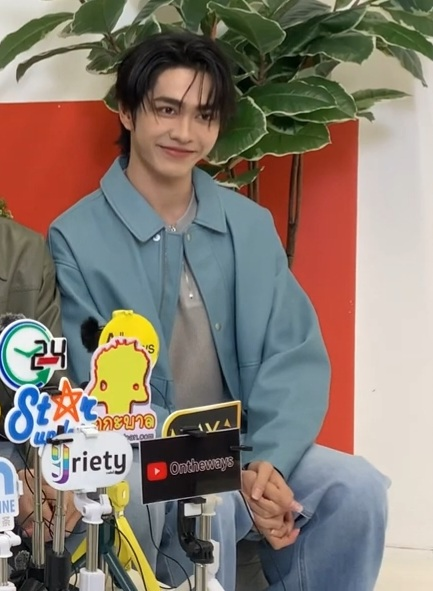
- Tharatorn in June 2025
- Born: 28 September 1998 (age 28); Ban Pong, Ratchaburi, Thailand
- Other name: Boom (บูม)
- Education: Kasetsart University
- Occupations: Actor; Singer
- Years active: 2022–present
- Agent: GMMTV (2022–2026)
- Known for: Khaofang in We Are; Warich in Perfect 10 Liners; Raffy in Only Friends: Dream On
- Height: 187 cm (6ft 1in)
- Website: GMMTV Artists

Tharatorn Jantharaworakarn (Thai: ธราธร จันทรวรกาญจน์; born 28 September 1998), nicknamed Boom (Thai: บูม), is a Thai actor and singer known for his roles in We Are (2024), Perfect 10 Liners (2024) and Only Friends: Dream On (2026).

== Career ==
Tharatorn officially first entered the acting industry with a supporting role in the GMMTV television series Enchanté in 2022. His breakthrough role came in the 2024 television series We Are where he was cast as a lead, with a second lead role in the 2026 television series Only Friends: Dream On when the acting partnership between Pawat Chittsawangdee and Thanaphon U-sinsap was dissolved.

On October 19, 2026, the acting partnership between Tharatorn and Thanaboon Kiatniran (Aou) was dissolved. Tharatorn subsequently left GMMTV on October 31, 2026.

== Filmography ==
=== Television series ===
Year	Title	Role	Notes	Network	Ref.
2008	Spirit of Love	Jeng	Guest role	Channel 5	
2020	Fai Sin Chua	—N/a	Guest role	GMM 25	
2022	Enchanté	Wayo	Supporting role	GMM 25	
2022	Oops! Mr. Superstar Hit on Me	Sunny	Supporting role	GMM 25	
2022	Vice Versa	Fuse	Supporting role	GMM 25	
2022	Good Old Days: Love Wins	Meng	Supporting role	GMM 25	
2022	The Three GentleBros	Win	Supporting role	GMM 25	
2023	Midnight Museum	"Dome" Danuphong Udomsin	Guest role	GMM 25	
2023	Hidden Agenda	Pok	Supporting role	GMM 25	
2024	We Are	Khaofang	Main role	GMM 25	
2024	Perfect 10 Liners	Warich	Supporting role	GMM 25	
2025	Memoir of Rati	Baronet Dech / M.L. Dechapatrapee Suriyakorn	Supporting role	GMM 25	
2025	Dare You to Death	Yuki	Supporting role	GMM 25	
2026	Only Friends: Dream On	Raffy	Main role	One 31	

=== Music video appearances ===
Year	Title	Artist	Soundtrack	Label	Ref.
2024	"นานตลอดกาล (We Are Forever)"	Phuwin Tangsakyuen	We Are OST	GMMTV Records	
2026	"ห้ามแต (No One Can)"	Gawin Caskey	Only Friends: Dream On OST	GMMTV Records	
2026	"ไม่ยอม (All In)"	Mix Sahaphap	Only Friends: Dream On OST	GMMTV Records	

== Discography ==
=== Singles ===
==== Soundtracks ====
Year	Title	Soundtrack	Label	Ref.
2024	"เรามีเรา (WE ARE)" with Pond, Phuwin, Winny, Satang, Aou, Marc and Poon	We Are OST	GMMTV Records	
2024	"หมดมุก (Jokester)" with Aou Thanaboon	We Are OST	GMMTV Records	
2025	"อยาก-ให้ (Wishes Come True)" with Aou Thanaboon	Memoir of Rati OST	GMMTV Records	
2026	"วงแหวนดาวเสาร์ (Saturn)" with Aou Thanaboon	Only Friends: Dream On OST	GMMTV Records	
2026	"เอาเลยมั้ย (Let’s Try)" Dream On Ver. with Earth, Mix, Joss, Gawin and Aou	Only Friends: Dream On OST	GMMTV Records	

== Fanmeetings ==
Title	Date	Venue	Notes	Ref.
Vice Versa Final EP. FanMeeting	October 1, 2022	Mastercard Cinema, SF World Cinema, Centralworld	With Vice Versa Cast	
We Are FOREVER Fan Meeting in Tokyo	October 17–18, 2024	Tachikawa Stage Garden	With We Are Cast	
We Are FOREVER Fan Meeting in Hong Kong	October 20, 2024	The Londoner, Macau	With We Are Cast	
We Are FOREVER Fan Meeting in Taipei	November 2, 2024	Legacy TERA	With We Are Cast	
GMMTV FanDay 18 in Tokyo	March 1, 2025	Bellesalle Shiodome, B1F Hall	With Aou	
AouBoom FanMeeting in Macau	May 4, 2025	Broadway Theatre	With Aou	
Memoir of Rati: The First Chapter	June 20, 2025	6 Fl. Siam Paragon, Siam Pavalai, Paragon Cineplex	With Memoir of Rati Cast	
Memoir of Rati Final EP. Fan Meeting	September 5, 2025	6 Fl. Siam Paragon, Siam Pavalai, Paragon Cineplex	With Memoir of Rati Cast	
GMMTV FanDay 26 in Vietnam	November 22, 2025	Ben Thanh Theatre	With Aou	
AouBoom FanMeeting in Italy	December 13, 2025	Milton Rome Airport Hotel	With Aou	
GMMTV FanDay 28 in Tokyo	January 11, 2026	Nissho Hall	With Aou	
Naiin Book Fair 2026	January 31st, 2026	Samyan Mitrtown, 5th Fl.	With Aou	
Only Friends: Dream On - The Play Begins	February 27, 2026	7th Fl. Centralworld Pulse Hall	With Only Friends: Dream On Cast	
GMMTV Fanival 2026	March 20, 2026	7th Fl. Centralworld Pulse Hall	With Aou	
Only Friends: Dream On - Final EP. Fan Meeting	May 15, 2026	3rd Fl. MCC Hall, The Mall Lifestore Bangkapi	With Only Friends: Dream On Cast	
Only Friends: Dream On in Mexico City	September 9, 2026	Expo Reforma	With Only Friends: Dream On Cast	
Only Friends: Dream On in Lima	September 12, 2026	Parque de la Exposición	With Only Friends: Dream On Cast	
Only Friends: Dream On in Brazil	September 14, 2026	Teatro Renault	With Only Friends: Dream On Cast	

== Concerts ==
Title	Date	Venue	Notes	Ref.
We Are FOREVER Fancon	16–17 August 2024	True Icon Hall, Iconsiam	With Aou, Pond, Phuwin, Winny, Satang, Marc, Poon, Pepper, Tee, JJ	
We Are FOREVER Fancon in Vietnam	14 September 2024	Hoa Binh Theater	With Aou, Pond, Phuwin, Winny, Satang, Marc, Poon	
