= Thanaboon Kiatniran =

Thai actor and singer (born 2000)

- ธนบูรณ์ เกียรตินิรันดร์
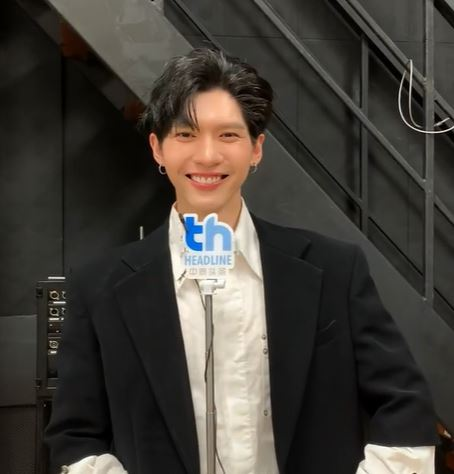
- Thanaboon in April 2025
- Born: 9 January 2000 (age 26); Khon Kaen, Thailand
- Other name: Aou (อู๋)
- Education: Khon Kaen University
- Occupations: Actor; Singer
- Years active: 2022–present
- Agent: GMMTV
- Known for: Tan in We Are; Klao in Perfect 10 Liners; Rome in Only Friends: Dream On
- Height: 184 cm (6ft)
- Musical career
- Genre: Thai Pop
- Instrument: Vocals
- Years active: 2024–present
- Label: Riser Music
- Website: GMMTV Artists

Thanaboon Kiatniran (Thai: ธนบูรณ์ เกียรตินิรันดร์; born 9 January 2000), nicknamed Aou (Thai: อู๋), is a Thai actor. In addition to his acting career, Thanaboon is a singer-songwriter and a member of the T-pop boy group JASP.ER, formed by Riser Music. The group debuted on December 19th, 2024, with the digital single "แรงอีกนิด (Sadistic)".

== Career ==
Thanaboon first entered the acting industry with a supporting role in the GMMTV television series Enchanté in 2022. His breakthrough role came in the 2024 television series We Are where he was cast as a lead. He gained his second lead role in the 2026 television series Only Friends: Dream On when the acting partnership between Pawat Chittsawangdee and Thanaphon U-sinsap was dissolved.

In 2024, Thanaboon and fellow GMMTV actors Archen Aydin, Pongsapak Udompoch and Naravit Lertratkosum formed the boy group JASP.ER under the Riser Music label. JASP.ER debuted with their digital single "แรงอีกนิด (Sadistic)" on December 19th, 2024.

On October 19, 2026, the acting partnership between Thanaboon and Tharatorn Jantharaworakarn (Boom) was dissolved.

== Filmography ==
=== Film ===
Year	Title	Role	Notes	Ref.
2024	Love You to Debt	Pad	Supporting role	

=== Television series ===
Key
†	Denotes television productions that have not yet been released

Year	Title	Role	Notes	Network	Ref.
2022	Enchanté	Phupha	Supporting role	GMM 25	
2022	Vice Versa	Aou / Tou	Supporting role	GMM 25	
2022	The Eclipse	Mes	Guest role	GMM 25	
2023	Midnight Museum	Jib	Guest role	GMM 25	
2023	Our Skyy 2: PuenTalay	Tou	Supporting role	GMM 25	
2023	Be My Favorite	Max	Supporting role	GMM 25	
2023	Hidden Agenda	Jeng	Supporting role	GMM 25	
2024	Beauty Newbie	Jerry	Supporting role	GMM 25	
2024	We Are	Tan	Main role	GMM 25	
2024	Perfect 10 Liners	Klao	Supporting role	GMM 25	
2025	The Ex-Morning	"Tae" Treenat Jarussakkul	Supporting role	GMM 25	
2025	Memoir of Rati	Mek	Supporting role	GMM 25	
2025	Dare You to Death	Lee	Supporting role	GMM 25	
2026	Only Friends: Dream On	Rome	Main role	One 31	
TBA	Fake Boss, Real Boyfriend †	Yos	Main role	TBA	
TBA	High & Low: Born to Be High †	Fifa	Supporting role	TBA	
TBA	Vamp Eternal Destiny †	TBA	TBA	TBA	

=== Music video appearances ===
Year	Title	Artist	Soundtrack	Label	Ref.
2024	"นานตลอดกาล (We Are Forever)"	Phuwin Tangsakyuen	We Are OST	GMMTV Records	
2026	"ห้ามแต (No One Can)"	Gawin Caskey	Only Friends: Dream On OST	GMMTV Records	
2026	"ไม่ยอม (All In)"	Mix Sahaphap	Only Friends: Dream On OST	GMMTV Records	

== Discography ==
=== Singles ===
==== Digital singles ====
Year	Title	Label	Notes	Ref.
2024	"แรงอีกนิด (Sadistic)"	Riser Music	JASP.ER 1st digital single	
2025	"ถอด (Take It Off)"	Riser Music	JASP.ER 2nd digital single	
2025	"Touch"	Riser Music	JASP.ER 3rd digital single	
2026	"Love Scene"	Riser Music	JASP.ER 4th digital single	
2026	"Wish"	Riser Music	JASP.ER 5th digital single	
2026	"Please"	Riser Music	JASP.ER 6th digital single	

==== Soundtracks ====
Year	Title	Soundtrack	Label	Ref.
2024	"เรามีเรา (WE ARE)" with Pond, Phuwin, Winny, Satang, Boom, Marc and Poon	We Are OST	GMMTV Records	
2024	"หมดมุก (Jokester)" with Boom Tharatorn	We Are OST	GMMTV Records	
2025	"อยาก-ให้ (Wishes Come True)" with Boom Tharatorn	Memoir of Rati OST	GMMTV Records	
2026	"วงแหวนดาวเสาร์ (Saturn)" with Boom Tharatorn	Only Friends: Dream On OST	GMMTV Records	
2026	"เอาเลยมั้ย (Let’s Try)" Dream On Ver. with Earth, Mix, Joss, Gawin and Boom	Only Friends: Dream On OST	GMMTV Records	

==== Composer credits ====
Year	Artist	Song title
2026	JASP.ER	"Love Scene"

== Fanmeetings ==
Title	Date	Venue	Notes	Ref.
Vice Versa Final EP. FanMeeting	October 1, 2022	Mastercard Cinema, SF World Cinema, Centralworld	With Vice Versa Cast	
Be My Favorite Final EP. Fan Meeting	August 11, 2023	Mastercard Cinema, SF World Cinema, Centralworld	With Be My Favorite Cast	
We Are FOREVER Fan Meeting in Tokyo	October 17–18, 2024	Tachikawa Stage Garden	With We Are Cast	
We Are FOREVER Fan Meeting in Hong Kong	October 20, 2024	The Londoner, Macau	With We Are Cast	
We Are FOREVER Fan Meeting in Taipei	November 2, 2024	Legacy TERA	With We Are Cast	
GMMTV FanDay 18 in Tokyo	March 1, 2025	Bellesalle Shiodome, B1F Hall	With Boom	
AouBoom FanMeeting in Macau	May 4, 2025	Broadway Theatre	With Boom	
Memoir of Rati: The First Chapter	June 20, 2025	6 Fl. Siam Paragon, Siam Pavalai, Paragon Cineplex	With Memoir of Rati Cast	
The Ex-Morning Final EP. FanMeeting	July 24, 2025	6 Fl. Siam Paragon, Siam Pavalai, Paragon Cineplex	With The Ex-Morning Cast	
Memoir of Rati Final EP. Fan Meeting	September 5, 2025	6 Fl. Siam Paragon, Siam Pavalai, Paragon Cineplex	With Memoir of Rati Cast	
GMMTV FanDay 26 in Vietnam	November 22, 2025	Ben Thanh Theatre	With Boom	
AouBoom FanMeeting in Italy	December 13, 2025	Milton Rome Airport Hotel	With Boom	
GMMTV FanDay 28 in Tokyo	January 11, 2026	Nissho Hall	With Boom	
Naiin Book Fair 2026	January 31st, 2026	Samyan Mitrtown, 5th Fl.	With Boom	
Only Friends: Dream On - The Play Begins	February 27, 2026	7th Fl. Centralworld Pulse Hall	With Only Friends: Dream On Cast	
GMMTV Fanival 2026	March 20, 2026	7th Fl. Centralworld Pulse Hall	With Boom	
Only Friends: Dream On - Final EP. Fan Meeting	May 15, 2026	3rd Fl. MCC Hall, The Mall Lifestore Bangkapi	With Only Friends: Dream On Cast	
GMMTV International Novel Festival 2026	July 30, 2026	Samyan Mitrtown, 5th Fl.	With JASP.ER	
Only Friends: Dream On in Mexico City	September 9, 2026	Expo Reforma	With Only Friends: Dream On Cast	
Only Friends: Dream On in Lima	September 12, 2026	Parque de la Exposición	With Only Friends: Dream On Cast	
Only Friends: Dream On in Brazil	September 14, 2026	Teatro Renault	With Only Friends: Dream On Cast	

== Concerts ==
Title	Date	Venue	Notes	Ref.
We Are FOREVER Fancon	August 16–17, 2024	True Icon Hall, Iconsiam	With Boom, Pond, Phuwin, Winny, Satang, Marc, Poon, Pepper Tee, JJ	
We Are FOREVER Fancon in Vietnam	September 14, 2024	Hoa Binh Theater	With Boom, Pond, Phuwin, Winny, Satang, Marc, Poon	
GMMTV Musicon Japan	July 26–27, 2025	Toyosu PIT	With JASP.ER, Krist, Gawin, Satang, Keen, Barcode, LYKN	
Riser Concert: The First Rise	February 13–15, 2026	Impact Arena, Muang Thong Thani	With JASP.ER, Krist, Nanon, Win, Fourth, Gemini, Phuwin, Perth, LYKN, Felizz, Clo'ver	
GMMTV Musicon Singapore	May 30–31, 2026	Singapore Expo, Singapore	With JASP.ER, Krist, Nanon, Gawin, LYKN, Felizz, Clo'ver	
PerthSanta Devil's Kiss Concert	July 18, 2026	Paragon Hall	With Perth, Santa, Luke	
PondPhuwin Space Soul-dyssey Concert	August 22, 2026	Impact Arena, Muang Thong Thani	With Phuwin, JASP.ER	
JASP.ER Temptation Concert	December 18–20, 2026	Impact Arena, Muang Thong Thani	With JASP.ER	

Upcoming

== Awards and nominations ==
Year	Event	Category	Nominated work	Result	Ref.
2025	Komchadleuk Awards	Best New Artist Award with JASP.ER	"แรงอีกนิด (Sadistic)"	Nominated	
2025	Kazz Awards	Rookie Artist Award with JASP.ER	—N/a	Won	
