= Sapol Assawamunkong =

Thai actor (born 1993)

- สพล อัศวมั่นคง
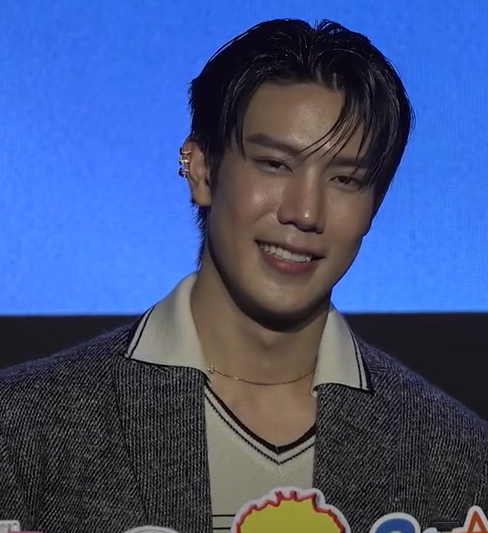
- Sapol in October 2023
- Born: 6 December 1993 (age 32); Bangkok, Thailand
- Other name: Great (เกรท)
- Education: Sirindhorn International Institute of Technology
- Occupations: Actor; MC; singer; YouTubers
- Years active: 2015—present
- Agents: Channel 7 (2018—2022); GMMTV (2022-present)
- Known for: Jerd in Inhuman Kiss; Saoek in Rak Wan Ban Wun; Sarn in Song Naree; Zeng in Lovers & Gangsters
- Height: 180 cm (5 ft 11 in)

Sapol Assawamunkong (Thai: สพล อัศวมั่นคง; born 6 December 1993), nicknamed Great (Thai: เกรท), is a Thai actor, MC and singer. He is known for his roles in the film Inhuman Kiss, and in the television series Song Naree (2019), Manner of Death (2020), Wandee Goodday (2024), and Memoir of Rati (2025).

== Early life and education ==
Sapol Assawamunkong was born on 6 December 1993 in Bangkok, Thailand. He graduated high school from Bodindecha School (Sing Singhaseni). He hold a bachelor's degree in the Department of Technology Management from Sirindhorn International Institute of Technology.

== Career ==
He began his entertainment career in 2015. He competed in The Cleo Most Eligible Bachelor 2016 competition and won the first prize.

He made his acting debut with the 2015 drama Room Alone 2, playing Key. In 2017, he played a supporting role in the drama Bangkok Love Stories: Please. In 2018, he signed a contract for 5 years with the Channel 7 and starred in the drama Rak Wan Ban Wun where he reprised his role as Saoek as the male lead. He then starred in drama Jao Sao Chang Yon in the same year.

In 2019, he made his big-screen debut as a main role in the popular romantic horror film Inhuman Kiss. In the same year, he starred as a main role in the drama Song Naree.

In 2010, he played supporting roles in several dramas: Tawan Arb Dao, Prom Pissawat, Rahut Rissaya, and Manner of Death. He received positive reviews for his portrayal of Inspector M in Manner of Death which led to increased popularity. He released a duet with Kao Noppakao titled "Too Little, Too Late" (คิดได้) under the 'Boyfriends' project in September 2020.

In 2022, he signed a five-year contract with GMMTV, under which he was paired with Sarin Ronnakiat.

== Personal life ==
He is a Blink and fanboy of Lisa.

== Filmography ==
=== Film ===
Year	Title	Role	Notes
2019	How To Train Your Dragon 3	Hiccup	Thai dubbing
2020	Inhuman Kiss	Jerd	Main role
2021	OM! Crush On Me!	Thong	Support role
2023	Mondo	Dom	Main role
2023	Postman	Day	Main role
2023	Ghost Rookie	Win	Main role

=== Television ===
Key
†	Denotes television productions that have not yet been released

Year	Title	Role	Channel	Notes
2015	Room Alone 2	Key	One 31	Supporting role
2017	Bangkok Love Stories: Please	Pong	GMM25	Supporting role
2017	Por Yung Lung Mai Wahng	Cao Cao	Channel 3	Guest role
2018	Rak Wan Ban Wun	Saoek	Channel 7	Main role
2018	Jao Sao Chang Yon	Theeranun	Channel 7	Supporting role
2019	Lhong Ngao Jun	Plathip/Pete	Channel 7	Supporting role
2019	Song Naree	Wisarn/"Sarn"	Channel 7	Main role
2020	Tawan Arb Dao	Mek	Channel 7	Supporting role
2020	Prom Pissawat	Arnon/"Non"	Channel 7	Supporting role
2020	Rahut Rissaya	Thanakorn/"Thana"	Channel 7	Supporting role
2020	Manner of Death	Jirapat Polpraseit (Inspector M)	WeTV	Supporting role
2022	Miraculous 5 / Sao 5	Kring Khlongtakhian	Channel 7	Main role
2022	Sweet Prison	Saknarong	Channel 7	Supporting role
2022	Catch Me Baby	Pipat (Phat)	WeTV	Main role
2024	Start-Up	Jiraphat	TrueID	Main role
2024	Beauty Newbie	Saint	GMM25	Main role
2024	Wandee Goodday	"Yoryak" Phadetseuk	GMM25	Main role
2024	Octo: Kanjo Sosakan Shinno Akari Season 2	Krit Wonrat	YTV	Supporting role
2025	Memoir of Rati	Theerathon / M.R. Theerathonthanin Wisut / Count Suratheetamtanapich	GMM25	Main role
2026	Cat for Cash	Doctor Pom	GMM25	Supporting role
2026	Only Friends: Dream On	—N/a	One 31	Guest role (Ep. 12)
2026	Wu	Tong	GMM25	Supporting role
2026	Lovers & Gangsters	Zeng Klookfoon	One 31	Main role
TBA	Twenty One †	Mix	TBA	Supporting role
TBA	Stalemate †	Jump	TBA	Main role

=== Short series ===
Year	Title	Role	Notes
2020	Fah Mee Ta: The One I Miss	Kung	Main role

=== Music video appearances ===
Year	Title	Artist
2015	หลุมรัก	Instinct
2016	ไว้ใจ	KLEAR
2017	ไกลเท่าเดิม	Instinct
2018	ทานข้าวกันไหม	Palaphol Pholkongseng
2019	SRY(SORRY)	ฟักกลิ้ง ฮีโร่ ft.Maiyarap
2020	พูดเหมือนจำ ทำเหมือนเดิม	New Jiew
2021	หมดความหมาย	Potato

== Discography ==
Year	Title	With	Notes
2018	รักหวานบ้านวุ่น	Thanyawee Chunhasawasdikul	Rak Wan Ban Wun OST
2018	ในเมื่อมันคือรัก	Korakot Tunkaew	Jao Sao Chang Yon OST
2018	ปันรัก “ด้วยสองมือเรา”	Artit Tangwiboonpanit, Varakorn Sawaskorn, Phattharapon Dejpongwaranon, Yotsawat Tawapee, Pimprapa Tangprabhaporn, Maylada Susri, Mookda Narinrak, Kharittha Sungsaopath, Ramida Teerapat	Assemble the project of 7 Colors, Sharing Love for the World Year 10
2020	นอกสายตา		Prom Pissawat OST
2020	คิดได้	Noppakao Dechaphatthanakun	

== Hosting ==
Television

- 2017 : SPOTLIGHT ON TV On Air Ch.7 (2017–2018)
- 2019 : เส้นทางบันเทิง On Air Ch.7 (2019)

Online

- 2022 : On Air YouTube:Great SAPOL

== Awards and nominations ==
Year	Awards	Category	Nominated work	Result
2015	The Cleo Most Eligible Bachelor 2016	Winner	—N/a	Won
2017	Thailand Fever Awards 2017	Male Fever Rising Star Award 2017	Rak Wan Ban Wun	Won
2019	The 17th STARPICS THAI FILMS AWARDS	Outstanding Supporting Actor Award	Inhuman Kiss	Nominated
2019	Kazz Awards 2018	Hot new branch (male)	—N/a	Nominated
2020	Kazz Awards 2020	Rising Star Actor of the Year Award	—N/a	Nominated
2020	Kazz Awards 2020	Young Bang of The Year 2020	—N/a	Won
