= My Gear and Your Gown =

2020 Thai television series

- Official series poster
- Thai: เกียร์สีขาวกับกาวน์สีฝุ่น
- Genre: Romance; Drama
- Based on: เกียร์สีขาวกับกาวน์สีฝุ่น by ninepinta
- Directed by: Siwaj Sawatmaneekul
- Starring: Pahun Jiyacharoen; Pawin Kulkarunyawich; Chayakorn Jutamas; Patchata Janngeon; Napat Patcharachavalit
- Country of origin: Thailand
- Original language: Thai
- No. of episodes: 12

Production
- Production companies: GMMTV; Studio Wabi Sabi

Original release
- Network: WeTV; GMM 25 (Re-run release on 9 January 2021)
- Release: 14 September – 30 November 2020

My Gear and Your Gown (Thai: เกียร์สีขาวกับกาวน์สีฝุ่น; RTGS: Kia Si Khao Kap Kao Si Fun) is a 2020 Thai television series starring Pahun Jiyacharoen (Marc), Pawin Kulkarunyawich (Win), Chayakorn Jutamas (JJ), Patchata Janngeon (Fiat) and Napat Patcharachavalit (Aun).

Directed by Siwaj Sawatmaneekul, who also directed Love by Chance and Until We Meet Again, and produced by GMMTV together with Studio Wabi Sabi, the series was one of the three television series launched by WeTV together with GMMTV, Studio Wabi Sabi and TV Thunder on 23 June 2020. It premiered on WeTV on 14 September 2020, airing on Mondays at 18:00 ICT. The series concluded on 30 November 2020.

== Synopsis ==
Dr. Pai (Pawin Kulkarunyawich) is a medical student who previously led the school's academic club. With glasses on while growing up, he didn't have that confidence with his look and has never believed in love. Meanwhile, Itt (Pahun Jiyacharoen) is an engineering student and previously led the school's sports club. With his dominating presence, fate brings him back to his enemy who wears a dust grey medical gown earring.

== Cast and characters ==
=== Main ===
- Pahun Jiyacharoen (Marc) as Itt
- Pawin Kulkarunyawich (Pawin) as Pai
- Chayakorn Jutamas (JJ) as Waan
- Patchata Janngeon (Fiat) as Pure
- Napat Patcharachavalit (Aun) as Folk

=== Supporting ===
- Neen Suwanamas as Beau
- Intira Jaroenpura as Ms. Walailak Jaijong (school teacher)
- Phollawat Manuprasert (Tom) as Pai's father
- Nicole Theriault (Nikki) as Pai's mother
- Amarin Nitibhon (Am) as Itt's father
- Ratchanok Sangchuto (Nok) as Itt's mother
- Chonwari Chutiwatkhotrachai (Am) as Kai
- Wanwimol Jaenasavamethee (June) as Pang

=== Guest ===
- Surat Permpoonsavat (Yacht) as Nickie (Ep. 3, 10, 11)
- Kris Songsamphant (Karisa) as Pure's fling (Ep. 3)
- Chiwpreecha Thitichaya (Olive) as June (Ep. 4)
- Wanut Sangtianprapai (Mix) as Pure's ex (Ep. 4)
- Samantha Melanie Coates as Freshy Boy & Girl emcee (Ep. 11)

== Soundtrack ==
Song title	Romanized title	Artist	Ref.
ถ้าเธอลองเป็นฉัน	"Tha Tur Long Pen Chan"	Weerayut Chansook (Arm)	
