= Only Friends: Dream On =

2026 Thai television series

- Official series poster
- Thai: โอนลีเฟรนด์ : ดรีมออน
- Genre: Drama; Boys' love
- Screenplay by: Kanokphan Ornrattanasakul; Issaraporn Kuntisuk; Irene Insot
- Directed by: Pinya Chookamsri
- Starring: Pirapat Watthanasetsiri; Sahaphap Wongratch; Way-Ar Sangngern; Gawin Caskey; Thanaboon Kiatniran; Tharatorn Jantharaworakarn
- Opening theme: "ห้ามแตะ (No One Can)" by Gawin Caskey
- Ending theme: "ปิดฉาก (Dejavu)" by Earth Pirapat and Mix Sahaphap (Ep. 1, 5, 9); "Like The Tide" by Joss Way-ar and Gawin Caskey (Ep. 2, 4, 8); "วงแหวนดาวเสาร์ (Saturn)" by Aou Thanaboon and Boom Tharatorn (Ep. 3, 6–7); "ไม่ยอม (All In)" by Mix Sahaphap (Ep. 10–11); "เอาเลยมั้ย (Let’s Try)" Dream On Ver. by Earth Pirapat, Mix Sahaphap, Joss Way-ar, Gawin Caskey, Aou Thanaboon and Boom Tharatorn (Ep. 12)
- Composer: Anuroth Ketlekha
- Country of origin: Thailand
- Original language: Thai
- No. of episodes: 12

Production
- Executive producers: Sataporn Panichraksapong; Darapa Choeysanguan
- Producers: Tichakorn Phukhaotong; Krirana Sangkulang; Noppharnach Chaiyahwimhon; Jutamas Khawchat; Kaneenut Ruengrujira; Rabob Pokanngaen
- Production locations: Thammasat University; Denla British School; House Prachachuen
- Cinematography: Rath Roongrueangtantisook; Surasak Sakunrueang
- Running time: 50-80 minutes
- Production companies: GMMTV; Chamade Film

Original release
- Network: One 31; OneD; GagaOOLala
- Release: 27 February – 15 May 2026

Related
- Only Friends

Only Friends: Dream On (Thai: โอนลีเฟรนด์ : ดรีมออน) is a 2026, Thai television series starring Pirapat Watthanasetsiri (Earth), Sahaphap Wongratch (Mix), Way-Ar Sangngern (Joss), Gawin Caskey, Thanaboon Kiatniran (Aou) and Tharatorn Jantharaworakarn (Boom). It serves as a standalone series in a shared universe with Only Friends (2023) with Trai Nimtawat (Neo) reprising his role from the original series. It was broadcast on One 31 and is available to stream on OneD, GagaOOLala and the GMMTV official YouTube channel. It aired every Friday until May 15, 2026, concluding after 12 episodes.

Directed by Pinya Chookamsri and produced by GMMTV and Chamade Film, it was announced at GMMTV's Riding the Wave event on November 26, 2024.

== Synopsis ==
The plot involves deception, infidelity, betrayal, and the reappearance of a former acquaintance, which complicate both the production and the central romance

Romeo & Romeo: a queer twist on the well-known Shakespeare tragedy. With Jack (Pirapat Watthanasetsiri) set to direct the Fine Arts facility's annual stage play once again, his ex-boyfriend Dean (Sahaphap Wongratch) is ready to claim both the leading role and his spot back in Jack's heart. Raffy (Tharatorn Jantharaworakarn) is determined to not only rip the coveted role of Romeo from out of Dean's grip, but to finally win Jack's affections for himself. After their initial hookup, Rome (Thanaboon Kiatniran) is stuck on Raffy and accepts Dean's offer to lure him away from Jack. Despite his reservations, dance major Arnold (Way-Ar Sangngern) is willing to join the production once he hears about the cash reward for participation. His best friend and the show's costume designer Tua (Gawin Caskey) is more than willing to pay Arnold's way through if it means getting closer to his long-time crush.

== Cast and characters ==
=== Main ===
- Pirapat Watthanasetsiri (Earth) as Jakkarin Jookamsri (Jack)
- Sahaphap Wongratch (Mix) as Dechakorn Prempreeda (Dean)
- Way-Ar Sangngern (Joss) as Arnold
- Gawin Caskey as Tua
- Thanaboon Kiatniran (Aou) as Rome
- Tharatorn Jantharaworakarn (Boom) as Raffy

=== Supporting ===
- Trai Nimtawat (Neo) as Boston
- Patsit Permpoonsavat (Soodyacht) as Timmy
- Nattanon Tongsaeng (Fluke) as Pete
- Suphakorn Sriphotong (Pod) as Gameplay

=== Guest ===
- Kittiporn Rodvanich (Tangmo) as Pink (Ep. 1, 8)
- Kanaphan Puitrakul (First) as Sand (Ep. 1, 6, 12)
- Thanawat Rattanakitpaisan (Khaotung) as Ray Pakon (Ep. 1, 6, 12)
- Dujdao Vadhanapakorn as Ranchalee (Ep. 4–5)
- Jiratchapong Srisang (Force) as Top Tanin (Ep. 5, 8, 11)
- Kasidet Plookphol (Book) as Mew Witsarut (Ep. 5, 8, 11)
- Pakin Kunaanuwit (Mark) as Nick (Ep. 10)
- Thipakorn Thitathan (Ohm) as Win (Ep. 10)
- Panachkorn Rueksiriaree (Stamp) (Ep. 12)
- Sapol Assawamunkong (Great) (Ep. 12)

== Episodes ==
No.	Title	Original release date
1	"Act 1: Game On"	27 February 2026
Jack is set to direct the art and drama faculty's production once again. Dean and Raffy fight for the role of Romeo - and Jack's heart. Rome is determined to hook up with Raffy again. Tua convinces Arnold to audition through some unorthodox means.
2	"Act 2: Character Background"	6 March 2026
Arnold and Dean successfully score the leading roles as Romeo & Romeo, leaving Raffy stuck as a supporting role. Rome joins the production as sound designer at Jack's begruding request as Dean enlists Rome to keep Raffy away from Jack. Tua is convinced by Dean to share a private moment with Arnold.
3	"Act 3: Memory Recall"	13 March 2026
Boston forcefully inserts himself back into Tua's life as Arnold promises Tua he'll help keep them apart. Dean finds out Jack ended up in rehab because of him. Rome takes Raffy with him whilst he DJs a party with Raffy taking his first step to truly ruin Dean, only to succeed in pushing Jack back towards his ex instead.
4	"Act 4: Have Fun, No Drama"	20 March 2026
Rome chauffeurs Raffy to a talk show with his actress mother as Jack confirms he is still in love with Dean. Dean is determined to become a better person for Jack. Arnold is convinced by Tua to take on a modelling job for Boston after unintentionally leaving Tua in the friendzone again. Arnold is forced to begin confronting his feelings.
5	"Act 5: Super Objective"	27 March 2026
Arnold is still unsure of his feelings for Tua. When a sponsor for the play wants Raffy as Romeo instead of Dean, Jack comes up with a compromise. Tua gives Dean permission to post "couples content" online with Arnold. Rome warns Jack not to lead Raffy on as Boston turns his attention to the latter, causing Rome to lash out.
6	"Act 6: Building A Relationship"	3 April 2026
Dean and Arnold keep shooting fan-service content together, interfering with rehearsals and Jack's temper. Pete is encouraged to hit on Rome in front of Raffy. Timmy unknowingly throws a wrench into Tua's plan. Rome takes Raffy to a concert hosted by their seniors.
7	"Act 7: Point Of No Return"	10 April 2026
The theatre department are on their yearly outing as Jack and Dean reminisce about their beginning. Arnold makes Tua promise that he'll never lie to him again. Timmy realises someone is embezzling the production's sponsorship money and investigates. Rome and Raffy hook up in the woods despite knowing how Pete feels about Rome.
8	"Act 8: Intermission"	17 April 2026
Now that Jack and Dean are officially back together, Dean hires Rome's help again in order to make sure Raffy doesn't leak the video of himself and Arnold. Arnold and Tua go dancing. Rome takes Raffy to another club with the intent to delete the video himself. Arnold makes a choice that will define his relationship with Tua.
9	"Act 9: The Climax"	24 April 2026
Raffy decides to drop out of the play after losing his passion for acting and takes Rome out to dinner. Arnold and Tua go on a date to the amusement park Tua's family owns whilst Jack and Dean go on a movie date. When another video of Dean and Arnold gets leaked, Tua seeks out comfort in another.
10	"Act 10: The Show Must Go On"	1 May 2026
Raffy stops a drunk Jack from getting into a bar fight and takes him home. With nowhere else to go, Dean moves in with Gameplay. Boston gives Arnold some hard truths. Jack wants to use Raffy in order to hurt Dean, causing Rome to snap. Arnold corners Tua in the dressing room and declares his love again. Raffy finally chooses between Jack and Dean.
11	"Act 11: Off Stage"	8 May 2026
Timmy urges all his friends to make peace with each other. Raffy is determined to make Rome take a chance on him. Arnold earns Tua's forgiveness but at a physical cost. Rome finds out who leaked the video. Dean and Raffy form a truce whilst Arnold and Tua go dancing again. Jack and Dean share a moment.
12	"Act 12: Curtain Call"	15 May 2026
Jack and Dean come to an understanding. Raffy takes it upon himself to organise DJ gigs for Rome. Arnold's family want him to move to America. When a year has passed, who will follow their dreams and who will stay only friends?

== Original soundtrack ==
The official soundtrack for Only Friends: Dream On features:

Song	Artist(s)	Label	Ref.
"ห้ามแตะ (No One Can)"	Gawin Caskey	GMMTV Records	
"ปิดฉาก (Dejavu)"	Earth Pirapat and Mix Sahaphap	GMMTV Records	
"Like The Tide"	Joss Way-ar and Gawin Caskey	GMMTV Records	
"วงแหวนดาวเสาร์ (Saturn)"	Aou Thanaboon and Boom Tharatorn	GMMTV Records	
"ไม่ยอม (All In)"	Mix Sahaphap	GMMTV Records	
"เอาเลยมั้ย (Let’s Try)" Dream On Ver.	Earth Pirapat, Mix Sahaphap, Joss Way-ar, Gawin Caskey, Aou Thanaboon and Boom Tharatorn	GMMTV Records	

== Production ==
Due to the termination of the acting partnership between Pawat Chittsawangdee (Ohm) and Thanaphon U-sinsap (Leng) on March 15, 2025, it was announced a day later that the role of Rome would be recast to Thanaboon Kiatniran (Aou) and the role of Raffy would be recast to Tharatorn Jantharaworakarn (Boom). Production for the series began on June 27, 2025, and filming for the series officially ended on September 8, 2025.

== Fan meetings ==
Year	Title	Date	Venue	Ref.
2026	Only Friends Dream On : The Play Begins	27 February 2026	7th fl. centralwOrld PULSE Hall	
2026	Only Friends Dream On : Final EP. Fan Meeting	15 May 2026	MCC HALL FL. 3, THE MALL LIFESTORE BANGKAPI	

== Tours ==
Year	Title	Date	Venue	Ref.
2026	Only Friends: Dream On in Mexico City	9 September 2026	Expo Reforma, Mexico City, Mexico	
2026	Only Friends: Dream On in Lima	12 September 2026	Parque de la Exposición, Lima, Peru	
2026	Only Friends: Dream On in Brazil	14 September 2026	Teatro Renault, São Paulo, Brazil	

=== Cancelled events ===
On August 22, 2026, GMMTV released a statement that "due to delays of the US Visa process that were outside our control, Pirapat Watthanasetsiri (Earth), Sahaphap Wongratch (Mix), Thanaboon Kiatniran (Aou) and Tharatorn Jantharaworakarn (Boom) are not able to travel to North America" for the Vancouver and Washington D.C. legs of the Only Friends: Dream On Americas Tour, and that the Only Friends: Dream On in Vancouver event had been cancelled.

Year	Title	Date	Venue
2026	Only Friends: Dream On in Vancouver	4 September 2026	The Queen Elizabeth Theatre, Vancouver, Canada

=== Altered events ===
However, since Way-Ar Sangngern (Joss) and Gawin Caskey were able to travel at this time, the Only Friends: Dream On in Washington D.C. had been rebranded to the JossGawin Fan Meeting in Washington D.C. at the same venue, merging both scheduled shows onto September 6, 2026 instead.

Year	Title	Date	Venue
2026	Only Friends: Dream On in Washington D.C.	6–7 September 2026	The Howard Theatre, Washington D.C., USA
