= Bad Buddy =

2021–22 Thai television series

- Official series poster
- Thai: แค่เพื่อนครับเพื่อน
- Genre: Romantic comedy; Boys' love
- Based on: หลังม่าน (Behind The Scenes) by Afterday, -West-
- Directed by: Noppharnach Chaiwimol
- Starring: Korapat Kirdpan; Pawat Chittsawangdee
- Opening theme: • "เพลงที่เพิ่งเขียนจบ (Our Song) (Instrumental) by Nanon Korapat
- Ending theme: • "แค่เพื่อนมั้ง (Just Friend?)" by Nanon Korapat (since Episode 1) • "จะไม่บอกใครละกันว่าเธอชอบฉันก่อน (Secret: Won't Tell Anyone That You Like Me First)" by Kacha Nontanun (since Episode 6) • "เพลงที่เพิ่งเขียนจบ (Our Song) by Nanon Korapat (since Episode 11)
- Country of origin: Thailand
- Original language: Thai
- No. of seasons: 1
- No. of episodes: 12

Production
- Production company: GMMTV

Original release
- Network: GMM 25; WeTV
- Release: 29 October 2021 – 21 January 2022

Related
- Our Skyy 2

Bad Buddy (Thai: แค่เพื่อนครับเพื่อน; RTGS: Khae Phuean Khrap Phuean, lit. "Just a Friend, Friend") is a 2021 Thai romantic BL comedy-drama television series starring Korapat Kirdpan (Nanon) and Pawat Chittsawangdee (Ohm). Based on the novel Behind The Scenes by Afterday and -West-, it tells the story of two boys who came from warring, neighboring families and found themselves competing for almost everything, but developed romantic feelings for each other along the way.

Directed by Noppharnach Chaiwimol (Aof) and produced by GMMTV, this series is one of 16 television series of GMMTV for 2021 during their "GMMTV 2021: The New Decade Begins" event on 3 December 2020. It premiered on GMM25 on 29 October 2021, airing on every Friday at 20:30 ICT (8:30 pm), while its full uncut version aired at 22:30 ICT (10:30 pm) on WeTV. It replaced the Friday slot of the Fish upon the Sky rerun on GMM25.

It was featured on Teen Vogue's best BL dramas of 2022 list.

== Synopsis ==
The narrative centers on a long-standing intergenerational rivalry between Pat (Pawat Chittsawangdee), and Pran (Korapat Kirdpan), Raised by parents who operate competing neighboring hardware businesses and maintain deep-seated personal animosity, the two boys are driven into continuous competition. Despite their contrasting personalities. Pat being impulsive and Pran meticulous their upbringing obliges them to treat each other as opponents in all academic and personal pursuits.

When an incident happens at the age of 12, their hatred begins to dissolve: Pat's little sister, Pa (Pattranite Limpatiyakorn), starts drowning in a pond. While Pat is still in a state of shock and fear, Pran immediately rushes into the water and saves Pa from drowning. Their relationship has changed since then. On the surface, they still appear to be enemies, but they no longer truly detest each other. In the tenth grade, they are assigned to be in the same music band and become closer. Pran's family finds out, and he is sent away to a boarding school.

Two years later, they are brought together once again. Pat is chosen to be the freshman class president of the Faculty of Engineering while Pran is the class president of the Faculty of Architecture, two faculties that have a historic rivalry as well. Pa quickly finds out and asks Pat not to do Pran any harm because he was the one who saved her life. Pat and Pran's friends have a series of physical fights, and are told they will suffer consequences if they fight again. Pat and Pran, the leaders of their friend groups, decide to coordinate to keep their friends from running into each other. As they coordinate, they become closer, and eventually fall in love. They begin dating, hiding it from all of their friends and family until they are caught and must deal with the consequences.

== Cast and characters ==
=== Main ===
- Korapat Kirdpan (Nanon) as Pran
- Pawat Chittsawangdee (Ohm) as Pat

=== Supporting ===
- Pattranite Limpatiyakorn (Love) as Pa
- Pansa Vosbein (Milk) as Ink
- Jitaraphol Potiwihok (Jimmy) as Wai
- Sattabut Laedeke (Drake) as Korn
- Pahun Jiyacharoen (Marc) as Louis
- Teepakron Kwanboon (Prom) as Mo
- Thakorn Promsatitkul (Lotte) as Safe
- Pakin Kunaanuwit (Mark) as Chang
- Puttipong Sriwat (Leo Putt) as Ming (Pat's father)
- Pattamawan Kaomulkadee (Yui) as Pat's mother
- Passin Ruangvuth (A) as Pran's father
- Paradee Vongsawad (Ple) as Dissaya (Pran's mother)
- Thanavate Siriwattanakul (Gap) as Chai
- Kongkiat Khomsiri (Kome) as Tong

=== Guest ===
- Natachai Boonprasert (Dunk) Pat & Pran's school bandmate
- Passatorn Koolkang (Captain) Pat & Pran's school classmate
- Kittiphop Sereevichayasawat (Satang) as Pat & Pran's school bandmate
- Napat Patcharachavalit (Aun) as Pat & Pran's school classmate
- Norawit Titicharoenrak (Gemini) as Pat & Pran's school junior
- Arun Asawasuebsakul (Ford) as Pat & Pran's school junior
- Nattawat Jirochtikul (Fourth) as Pat & Pran's school junior
- Achita Panyamang (Kim) as Young Pat
- Tanapatch Chanthasorn (Zen) as Young Pran
- Nichamon Ladapornpipat (Nene) as Young Pa
- Chertsak Pratumsrisakhon (Chert) as Professor Pichai
- Suphasawatt Purnaveja (Watt) as Professor of Architecture
- Yaowalak Mekkulwiroj as Professor / Lecturer
- Kusuma Teppharak (Pong) as Ms. Payao
- Chayanee Chaladthanyakij (Meen) as Ms. Sunee
- Thitisan Goodburn (Kim) as Ham
- Passakorn Chaithep (Cnine) as Junior
- Amata Piyavanich (Jum) as Junior's mother
- Pradit Prasartthong (Tou) as Yod
- Thanadon Meewongtham (Au)
- Kornprom Niyomsil (Au) as Toto
- Wisit Chantaraparb (Plug) as Chart
- Poom Kaewfacharoen as Kwan (Architecture stageplay actor)

== Reception ==
=== Critical response ===
Jasmine Floretta, writing in Magdalene, called Bad Buddy "a Boys Love (BL) version of Romeo and Juliet" that "that transcends its own genre, combining brilliant acting and well written storyline."

=== Viewership ===
- In the table below, the blue number represents the lowest ratings and the red number represents the highest ratings.

Episode No.	Timeslot (UTC+07:00)	Air date	Average audience share	Ref.
1	Friday 8:30 pm	29 October 2021	0.131%	
2	Friday 8:30 pm	5 November 2021	0.112%	
3	Friday 8:30 pm	12 November 2021	0.131%	
4	Friday 8:30 pm	19 November 2021	0.058%	
5	Friday 8:30 pm	26 November 2021	0.150%	
6	Friday 8:30 pm	3 December 2021	0.072%	
7	Friday 8:30 pm	10 December 2021	0.062%	
8	Friday 8:30 pm	17 December 2021	0.088%	
9	Friday 8:30 pm	24 December 2021	0.158%	
10	Friday 8:30 pm	7 January 2022	0.1%	
11	Friday 8:30 pm	14 January 2022	0.2%	
12	Friday 8:30 pm	21 January 2022	0.165%	
Average			0.121% ^{1}	

^1 Based on the average audience share per episode.

=== Online ratings ===
As of 15 November 2021, the series has reached the No. 1 position on WeTV Thailand's most popular BL series rankings. It further become the most-streamed Thai television series and drama on 23 November 2021 and the most-watched title on the platform on 13 December 2021 after the release of Episode 7. Likewise, the series also made it to the Weekly Top 10 Most Watched Series of iWantTFC despite its exclusive availability in the Philippines. On the first rank release on 3 November 2021, the series' English-subtitled version reached Top 9. It consistently remained in the Top 10 throughout the weeks and as of 14 December 2021, few days after the release of Episode 7, the English-subtitled version reached Top 8 and the Filipino-dubbed version achieved Top 9.

== Soundtrack ==
Song title (Official Spelling)	Romanized title (RTGS)	English title	Artist	Ref.
แค่เพื่อนมั้ง (Kae Peuan Mang)	Khae Phuean Mang	"Just Friend?"	Korapat Kirdpan (Nanon)	
จะไม่บอกใครละกันว่าเธอชอบฉันก่อน (Ja Mai Bork Krai La Gun Wah Tur Chob Chan Korn)	Cha Mai Bok Khrai La Kan Wa Thoe Chop Chan Kon	"Secret (Won't Tell Anyone That You Like Me First)"	Kacha Nontanun	
เพลงที่เพิ่งเขียนจบ (Pleng Tee Peung Khean Jhob)	Phleng Thi Phoeng Khian Chop	"Our Song"	Korapat Kirdpan (Nanon)	

== Other appearances ==
Bad Buddy was included in the roster for the second part of their series, Our Skyy (entitled Our Skyy 2). Ohm and Nanon reprised their roles as Pat and Pran respectively.

== Awards and nominations ==
Year	Award	Category	Recipient(s) and nominee(s)	Result	Refs.
2021	WeTV Awards	Best of Thai Series	Bad Buddy Series	Won	
2021	WeTV Awards	Best of Y-Series	Bad Buddy Series	Won	
2021	PCA 2021	Best Thai Actor	Korapat Kirdpan (Nanon)	Won	
2021	PCA 2021	Best Thai Drama	Bad Buddy Series	Won	
2022	18th Kom Chad Luek Awards	Most Popular Lakorn/Series	Bad Buddy Series	Won	
2022	Maya Entertain Awards 2022	Song of The Year	Just Friend? by Korapat Kirdpan (Nanon)	Nominated	
2022	Maya Entertain Awards 2022	Series of The Year	Bad Buddy Series	Won	
2022	Kazz Awards 2022	Best Scene	Korapat Kirdpan (Nanon) and Pawat Chittsawangdee (Ohm)	Won	
2022	Kazz Awards 2022	Best Actor	Korapat Kirdpan (Nanon)	Won	
2022	Kazz Awards 2022	Best Couple	Korapat Kirdpan (Nanon) and Pawat Chittsawangdee (Ohm)	Won	
2022	Content Asia Awards 2022	Best LGBTQ+ Programme Made in Asia	Bad Buddy Series	Won	
2022	27th Asian Television Awards	Best Theme Song	Just Friend? by Korapat Kirdpan (Nanon)	Won	

== International broadcast ==
- Philippines – The series is one of the newest five GMMTV television series alongside "Baker Boys", "Not Me", "Enchanté", and "F4 Thailand: Boys Over Flowers" (a Thai adaptation of Meteor Garden, which had different versions in Taiwan, Japan, South Korea and China, which was aired before on ABS-CBN) that was acquired by ABS-CBN Corporation, after its successful acquisition of eight previous series under GMMTV. It was announced by Dreamscape Entertainment on 28 June 2021. All episodes with English subtitles was made available for streaming via iWantTFC starting on 29 October 2021, simulcast with its Thailand broadcast. The platform likewise released the series as dubbed in Filipino starting with the first episode on 4 November 2021.
- Japan – The series is acquired by TV Asahi and au to be released in Japan for the first time on the streaming platform Telasa. The first episode premiered with Japanese subtitles on 11 November 2021 and the succeeding episodes has been available sequentially every Thursday.

== Spin-off ==
Stories about Ink and Pa, a yuri couple in the series, have been made into an episode called "Zero Photography" of the miniseries Magic of Zero, released on 11 August 2022, with Milk and Love reprising their roles of Ink and Pa.

== See also ==
- List of BL dramas
