= Memoir of Rati =

2025 Thai television series

- Official series poster
- Thai: จาฤกรติชา
- Genre: Boys' love; Romance; Historical drama
- Based on: Memoir of Rati: จาฤกรติชา by P.PICHA (พลอยพิชา)
- Directed by: Natchanit Jirarungroj
- Starring: Sapol Assawamunkong; Sarin Ronnakiat
- Country of origin: Thailand
- Original language: Thai
- No. of episodes: 12

Production
- Executive producer: Sataporn Panichraksapong
- Running time: 50 minutes
- Production companies: GMMTV; Cholumpi Production

Original release
- Network: GMM25; Netflix
- Release: 20 June – 5 September 2025

Memoir of Rati (Thai: จาฤกรติชา; Charuekraticha) is a 2025 Thai television series directed by Natchanit Jirarungroj, starring Sapol Assawamunkong (Great) and Sarin Ronnakiat (Inn). Adapted from the novel of the same name by P.PICHA (พลอยพิชา) and produced by GMMTV together with Cholumpi Production, it was announced as one of the television series of GMMTV for 2025 during their "GMMTV2025: RIDING THE WAVE" event held on November 26, 2024. This series aired on GMM25 and Netflix from June 20 to September 5, 2025.

== Synopsis ==
After 20 years working as a translator for the French Embassy, Rati (Sarin Ronnakiat), an orphan adored by his master, returns to Siam. There, he meets Theerathon (Sapol Assawamunkong), the Deputy Minister of Education. They fell in love at first sight when they first met, and as they grew closer, their feelings for one another became more obvious. However, they must conceal it amidst the numerous hurdles that surround them. The same goes for Mek (Thanaboon Kiatniran), a manual laborer, and Baronet Dech (Tharatorn Jantharaworakarn). Therefore, is there a true love miracle that will allow their love to bloom in the midst of conflict?

== Cast and characters ==
=== Main ===
- Sapol Assawamunkong (Great) as Theerathon "Thee" / M.R. Theerathonthanin Wisut / Count Suratheetamtanapich
- Sarin Ronnakiat (Inn) as Rati Dier / Viscount Rati Jarupich

=== Supporting ===
- Thanaboon Kiatniran (Aou) as Mek
- Tharatorn Jantharaworakarn (Boom) as Baronet Dech / M.L. Dechapatrapee Suriyakorn
- Sivakorn Lertchuchot (Guy) as Sadejmai / Prince Krom Phraya Pijitpaibool
- Ploynira Hiruntaveesin as Yingpa / M.R. Tikumporn Borrirak
- Allan Asawasuebsakul (Ford) as M.R. Thiwa Wisut (Thee's younger brother)
- Thanik Kamontharanon (Pawin) as Kui
- David Asavanond as Lutin
- Penpetch Benyakul (Jab) as Prince Ram (Thee's father)
- Ronnadet Wongsaroj as Ruj (Dech's father)
- Tarika Thidathit (Koi) as Nareerat (Thee's grandmother)
- Sompob Benjathikul (Hmu) as Prince Ronnares
- Pimdao Panichsamai (Mutmee) as Rung
- Benedict Rebillet (Namo) as Florian
- Thanatchaporn Utsahajit (Best) as Jaem
- Varatta Vajrathon (Toh) as Ruedi (Prince Ram's second wife)
- Duangjai Hiransri (Pure) as Buaphan
