= That Summer (TV series) =

2025 Thai television series

- Official series poster
- Original title: ผมเจอเจ้าชายบนชายหาด
- Genre: Boys' love; Romantic drama
- Screenplay by: Tichakorn Phukhaotong; Nuttamon Yimyam
- Directed by: Tichakorn Phukhaotong
- Starring: Thanawin Pholcharoenrat; Kittiphop Sereevichayasawat
- Opening theme: "สายลมกับเกลียวคลื่น (Wind and Wave)" by Thanawin Pholcharoenrat
- Country of origin: Thailand
- Original language: Thai
- No. of episodes: 10

Production
- Executive producers: Sataporn Panichraksapong; Darapa Choeysanguan
- Producers: Noppharnach Chaiyahwimhon; Anuson Limprasert
- Production location: Thailand
- Running time: 47–80 minutes
- Production company: GMMTV

Original release
- Network: One 31; YouTube
- Release: 19 September – 21 November 2025

That Summer (Thai: ผมเจอเจ้าชายบนชายหาด; RTGS: Phom Choe Chao Chai Bon Chaihat lit. 'I Met a Prince on the Beach') is a 2025 Thai boys' love romantic drama television series, starring Thanawin Pholcharoenrat (Winny) and Kittiphop Sereevichayasawat (Satang). Directed by Tichakorn Phukhaotong (Jojo) and produced by GMMTV together with Chamade Film, it was announced at the GMMTV 2025: Riding the Wave event on 26 November 2024.

The series premiered on 19 September 2025, airing every Friday at 20:30 ICT on One 31 and GMMTV's official YouTube channel, and concluded on 21 November 2025.

== Synopsis ==
When Lava (Thanawin Pholcharoenrat), a troubled young man, is sent to live with his uncle on an island for a summer rehabilitation session, what he expected was a carefree vacation turns into a heart-wrenching encounter. He finds a mysterious man (Kittiphop Sereevichayasawat) unconscious on the beach, suffering from amnesia, and has to take care of him, unaware that this man is actually a prince.

== Cast and characters ==
=== Main ===
- Thanawin Pholcharoenrat (Winny) as Lava Tiwakorn

A troublesome young man, Lava, who constantly causes problems for his mother, so he is sent to an island to straighten him out and live with his uncle, Peng. But his life changes when he meets Davin, a young man who has lost his memory and is found washed up on the beach.

- Kittiphop Sereevichayasawat (Satang) as Wave / Prince Davin Everett Delroy

A prince of the fictional Kingdom of Arantha who is about to be appointed heir to the throne. However, due to certain circumstances, he ends up on an island with Lava, who takes care of him. Lava finds him unconscious on the beach of the island where he was sent. Suffering from loss of memory, Davin is put under the care of Uncle Peng. Lava names him Wave, after the waves that brought the young man to him.

=== Supporting ===
- Tanutchai Wijitvongtong (Mond) as Peng (Lava's uncle)

He's tasked with reforming the troublemaker Lava by Lava's mother. He's a key character who teaches Lava to adapt and confront life-changing situations.

- Phudtripart Bhudthonamochai (Ryu) as Dr. Wut

A doctor stationed on the island where Lava is sent and seems to be have quite a close relationship with Pheng. He examines Davin when Lava brought him to the hospital.

- Trai Nimtawat (Neo) as Tum

Tum is a worker at Peng's resort, who becomes Lava's friend. They're practically in the same friend group as Lava, and they often go everywhere together.

- Thishar Thurachon (Mint) as Kratae

A nurse at the hospital where Dr. Wut works.

=== Guest ===
- Tipnaree Weerawatnodom (Namtan) as Princess Anya (Davin's older sister)
- Charisar Oldham (Chari) as Princess Kate (Davin's younger sister)
- Sarut Vichitrananda (Big) as Davin's father
- Kwanrudee Klomklorm (Kwan) as Davin's mother
- Teeradech Vitheepanich (Tee) as Victor (Davin's friend)
- Ratchaarpaake Tunsiriwanlobp (Tutun) as Victor's father
- Ornanong Thaisriwong (Golf) as Lava's mother
- Gawin Caskey (Fluke) as Natee / Paolo
- Thinnaphan Tantui (Thor) as Peng's ex-boyfriend
- Harit Cheewagaroon (Sing) as Dr. Mai

== Production ==
After the series was announced by GMMTV during their Riding the Wave event on 26 November 2024, fitting of the cast members was held on 17 April 2025 before the script reading on 21 April. Filming started on 8 May 2025 and wrapped up on 4 August 2025. The official trailer was revealed on 1 September 2025.

== Fan meetings ==
Year	Title	Date	Venue	Ref.
2025	That Summer: The First Sunshine	19 September 2025	6th Fl. Siam Paragon - Siam Pavalai, Paragon Cineplex	
2025	That Summer: Final EP. Fan Meeting	21 November 2025	6th Fl. Siam Paragon - Siam Pavalai, Paragon Cineplex	

== Soundtrack ==
Title	Artist(s)	Ref.
"สายลมกับเกลียวคลื่น (Wind and Wave)"	Thanawin Pholcharoenrat	
"ใจฉันมีแค่เธอ (Belong With You)"	Thanawin Pholcharoenrat, Kittiphop Sereevichayasawat	
"ดาวหลงทาง (Sea and Star)"	Kittiphop Sereevichayasawat	

== Accolades ==
=== Listicles ===
Year-end lists for That Summer
Critic/Publication	List	Rank	Ref.
Teen Vogue	13 Best BL Dramas of 2025	Included	
