= Wandee Goodday =

2024 Thai television series

- Official series poster
- Thai: วันดีวิทยา
- Genre: Boys' love; Drama; Romantic comedy
- Based on: Wandee Wittaya: วันดีวิทยา by Nottakorn (นทกร)
- Directed by: Tanwarin Sukkhapisit
- Starring: Sapol Assawamunkong; Sarin Ronnakiat
- Country of origin: Thailand
- Original language: Thai
- No. of episodes: 12

Production
- Executive producer: Sataporn Panichraksapong
- Running time: 49 minutes
- Production companies: GMMTV; All This Entertainment

Original release
- Network: GMM25; Viu
- Release: 4 May – 20 July 2024

Wandee Goodday (Thai: วันดีวิทยา; Wandee Wittaya) is a 2024 Thai television series directed by Tanwarin Sukkhapisit, starring Sapol Assawamunkong (Great) and Sarin Ronnakiat (Inn). Adapted from the novel of the same name by Nottakorn (นทกร) and produced by GMMTV together with All This Entertainment, it was announced as one of the television series of GMMTV for 2024 during their "GMMTV2024: UP&ABOVE Part 1" event held on October 17, 2023. This series aired on GMM25 and Viu from May 4 to July 20, 2024.

== Synopsis ==
Because of drunkenness and heartbreak, Dr. Wandee (Sarin Ronnakiat) is suddenly dealing with Yoryak Phadetseuk (Sapol Assawamunkong), a cocky boxer who he had a one-night stand with. However, there's a reason that they decide to become "lovers" with benefits. However, things become complicated when the fake dating begins to turn into something more and they end up developing crushes on each other. Nevertheless, both of them still believe that they have someone else in their hearts, so they don’t dare to admit their own feelings.

== Cast and characters ==
=== Main ===
- Sapol Assawamunkong (Great) as Yoryak Phadetseuk
- Sarin Ronnakiat (Inn) as Doctor Wandee Laowatthana

=== Supporting ===
- Suphakorn Sriphotong (Pod) as Doctor Ter
- Thinnaphan Tantui (Thor) as Oye
- Nattanon Tongsaeng (Fluke) as Cher
- Sattabut Laedeke as Plakao
- Phatchatorn Thanawat (Ployphach) as Taemrak
- Chayapol Jutamas (AJ) as Ohm
- Thasorn Klinnium (Emi) as Doctor Kwan
- Veeraporn Nitiprapha as Monthakan
- Samart Payakaroon as Yingyot
- Pijika Jittaputta (Lookwa) as Nipa
- Parinphop Pahoul (Premier) as Namphu
- Luke Ishikawa Plowden as Sasaki
- Apirak Chaipanha (Yokee) as Doctor Aphichat

=== Guest ===
- Yamin PK Saenchai as boxer (Ep. 1)
- Wasupol Panyalertprapha (Boss) as All Day All Night salesman (Ep. 1)
- Phubeth Atarunwong (Theme) as Mac (Ep. 2)
- Oubonpun Werajong as nurse (Ep. 2–3)
- Praweenpatch Sukhaphisit (Gift) as nurse (Ep. 2–3)
- Tanwarin Sukkhapisit (Golf) as cafe waitress (Ep. 2, 5, 12)
- Jirat Oonkaew as nurse (Ep. 3, 12)
- Petsimok PK Saenchai as big boy JC (Ep. 4)
- Theerachaya Pimkitidaj (Book) as Mai (Ep. 7, 9, 11–12)
- Patcharapon Santiporn (Pass) as doctor (Ep. 9)
- Kirati Puangmalee (Title) as Blue (Ep. 11–12)
