= Star in My Mind =

2022 Thai television series

- Official series poster
- Thai: แล้วแต่ดาว
- Genre: Comedy; Romantic; Boys' Love
- Based on: แล้วแต่ดาว by Peachhplease
- Screenplay by: Inthira Thahasarnsumrit
- Directed by: Siwaj Sawatmaneekul
- Starring: Archen Aydin; Natachai Boonprasert
- Opening theme: "แล้วแต่ดาว (My Starlight)" by Joong Archen (Ep. 1, 3–8) "ท้องฟ้ากับแสงดาว (Star & Sky)" by Louis Thanawin (Ep. 2)
- Ending theme: "ท้องฟ้ากับแสงดาว (Star & Sky)" by Louis Thanawin (Ep. 1–8)
- Country of origin: Thailand
- Original language: Thai
- No. of episodes: 8

Production
- Executive producers: Sataporn Panichraksapong; Darapa Choeysanguan
- Producer: Nuttapong Mongkolsawas
- Production location: Thailand
- Running time: 41 - 47 minutes
- Production companies: GMMTV; Studio Wabi Sabi

Original release
- Network: GMM 25; YouTube
- Release: April 8 – May 27, 2022

Related
- Sky in Your Heart; Our Skyy 2

Star in My Mind (Thai: แล้วแต่ดาว; RTGS: Laeo Tae Dao) is a 2022 Thai boys' love television series, starring Archen Aydin (Joong) and Natachai Boonprasert (Dunk). Directed by Siwaj Sawatmaneekul (New) and produced by GMMTV, the series was announced at the GMMTV "BORDERLESS" event on 1 December 2021. The series premiered on GMM 25 and Viu on 8 April 2022 until 27 May 2022.

== Synopsis ==
Daonuea (Natachai Boonprasert), a high school student, confesses his feelings to Khabkluen (Archen Aydin), his crush, before moving to Germany. However, Khabkluen does not reciprocate his feelings, leading to an awkward parting. Years later, they reunite at university, now living in the same dormitory. As they spend more time together, old emotions resurface, and Khabkluen's true feelings become clearer. Will Daonuea be able to move on, or will their love story get a second chance? This romantic drama explores themes of unspoken love, second chances, and self-discovery.

== Cast and characters ==
=== Main ===
- Natachai Boonprasert (Dunk) as Daonuea Wattana-wattanachot (Nuea / Dao)
- Archen Aydin (Joong) as Kanaruj Wongthampanich (Khabklen / Kluen)

=== Supporting ===
- Phanuroj Chalermkijporntavee (Pepper) as Typhoon / Phoon
- Chayakorn Jutamas (JJ) as Pokpong / Pong
- Thanawin Pholcharoenrat (Winny) as Nay
- Thinnaphan Tantui (Thor) as Noel
- Thanik Kamontharanon (Pawin) as Maitee
- Kittiphop Sereevichayasawat (Satang) as Sean
- Rutricha Phapakithi (Ciize) as Ting-Ting
- Preeyaphat Lawsuwansiri (Earn) as Papang
- Benyapa Jeenprasom (View) as Gia / Georgia
- Jirakit Thawornwong (Mek) as Khuafah Pitakchetaponkul (Fah)
- Jiruntanin Trairattanayon (Mark) as Na Chiang Dao (Prince) (Ep. 4, 8)

=== Guest ===
- Samantha Melanie Coates (Sammy) as Mentor (Ep. 1–3)
- Patsit Permpoonsavat (Sood Yacht) as Mentor (Ep. 1–3)
- Sueangsuda Lawanprasert (Namfon) as Khabkleun's mother (Ep. 2–5)
- Ratchapong Anomakiti (Poppy) as Buay (Ep. 8)
- Chinnarat Siriphongchawalit (Mike) as JJ (Ep. 8)
- Weerayut Chansook (Arm) as Mesa (Ep. 8)

== Soundtrack ==
Title	Artist	Ref.
"แล้วแต่ดาว (My Starlight)"	Archen Aydin (Joong)	
"ท้องฟ้ากับแสงดาว (Star&Sky)"	Thanawin Teeraphosukarn (Louis)	
"แล้วแต่ดาว (My Starlight) (English Version)"	Archen Aydin (Joong), Natachai Boonprasert (Dunk)	

== Reception ==
=== Viewership ===
In the table below, the blue numbers represent the lowest rating and the red numbers represent the highest rating.

Episode	Date	Timeslot (UTC+07:00)	Average audience share	Ref.
1	April 8, 2022	Friday 8:30 pm	0.071%	
2	April 15, 2022	Friday 8:30 pm	0.124%	
3	April 22, 2022	Friday 8:30 pm	0.087%	
4	April 29, 2022	Friday 8:30 pm	0.124%	
5	May 6, 2022	Friday 8:30 pm	0.086%	
6	May 13, 2022	Friday 8:30 pm	0.076%	
7	May 20, 2022	Friday 8:30 pm	0.084%	
8	May 27, 2022	Friday 8:30 pm	0.120%	
