= Midnight Museum =

2023 Thai television series

- Official series poster
- Original title: th
- Genre: Supernatural; Fantasy; Mystery; Thriller; Bromance
- Created by: GMMTV
- Written by: Chalermpong Udomsilp; Folk Sornpanath Patpho; Game Kirati Kumsat; Three Supawith Utama; Tatum Thanaphan Tangsittiprasert
- Directed by: Noom Attaporn Teemarkorn
- Starring: Thanapob Leeratanakachorn; Atthaphan Phunsawat; Patara Eksangkul; Tipnaree Weerawatnodom; Phatchatorn Thanawat; Apinya Sakuljaroensuk
- Country of origin: Thailand
- Original language: Thai
- No. of seasons: 1
- No. of episodes: 10

Production
- Producers: GMMTV; X Nuttapong Mongkolsawas
- Cinematography: Ruay Samruay Kruth-arj
- Editor: Pangpond Pitchayut Promsuwan
- Running time: 45 minutes
- Production company: GMMTV

Original release
- Network: GMM 25; Viu
- Release: 6 March – 4 April 2023

Midnight Museum (Thai: พิพิธภัณฑ์รัตติกาล), is a supernatural fantasy-thriller, starring Thanapob Leeratanakachorn (Tor) and Atthaphan Phunsawat (Gun) as main casts. In November 2022, the trailer was released during GMMTV's "Diversely Yours" event at Union Hall, Bangkok. On 6 March 2023, the series premiered on GMM 25 and VIU.

== Cast and characters ==
=== Main ===
- Thanapob Leeratanakachorn (Tor) as Khatha
- Atthaphan Phunsawat (Gun) as Dome

=== Supporting ===
- Apinya Sakuljaroensuk (Saiparn) as Anthika
- Patara Eksangkul (Foei) as Triphop
- Tipnaree Weerawatnodom (Namtan) as June
- Phatchatorn Thanawat (Ployphach) as Bam
- Tawan Vihokratana (Tay) as Boon

=== Guest ===
- Thanaboon Kiatniran (Aou) as Jib (Dome's co-worker)
- Chayakorn Jutamas (JJ) as Boss (Jib's friend)
- Thanat Lowkhunsombat (Lee) as Ghost
- Thanawin Pholcharoenrat (Winny) as It (thief)
- Chinnarat Siriphongchawalit (Mike) as Thief
- Vachirawit Chivaaree (Bright) as Moth
- Chayanit Chansangavej (Pat) as Rinlada Phitkosol (Rin)
- Way-Ar Sangngern (Joss) as Zen
- Thanathat Tanjararak (Indy) as Jay
- Bhobdhama Hansa (Java) as Auto
- Pawin Kulkaranyawich (Win) as Game
- Tharatorn Jantharaworakarn (Boom) as Danuphong Udomsin (Dome)
- Yongwaree Anilbol (Fah) as Ing
- Pimthong Washirakom (Dao) as Nisa
- Nophand Boonyai (On) as Kong
- Tontawan Tantivejakul (Tu) as Bee
- Worranit Thawornwong (Mook) as Ratchanee
- Korapat Kirdpan (Nanon) as Ton
- Benyapa Jeenprasom (View) as Anne
- Sivakorn Lertchuchot (Guy) as Soldier
- Jiruntanin Trairattanayon (Mark) as Phone
- Panachai Sriariyarungruang (Junior) as Nonthakon Phanpho (Tum)

== Production ==
On 6 March 2023, every Monday and Tuesday at 6:30pm Thailand time, the series released on GMMTV and streaming platform VIU. GMMTV put together many top Thai artists in one project. Each artist in cameo represents supernatural element associated with the items in the museum.

== Reception ==
Cameo roles of various artists in this supernatural series received warm reception and gained decent viewership. It got dubbed in many languages, and got released with subtitles in Singapore and Indonesia VIU.

== Viewership ratings and ranking ==
=== Average TV viewership ratings ===
- The blue number represents the lowest ratings and the red number represents the highest ratings in Thailand.

Episode	Original Broadcast Date	Average Audience Share
1	March 6, 2023	0.097%
2	March 7, 2023	0.118%
3	March 13, 2023	0.096%
4	March 14, 2023	0.088%
5	March 20, 2023	0.080%
6	March 21, 2023	0.088%
7	March 27, 2023	0.144%
8	March 28, 2023	0.064%
9	April 3, 2023	0.1%
10	April 4, 2023	0.1%
Average Rating		0.098%

^1Based on the average audience share per episode.
