= Natarit Worakornlertsith =

Thai actor (born 2002)

- ณฐริศร์ วรกรเลิศสิทธิ์
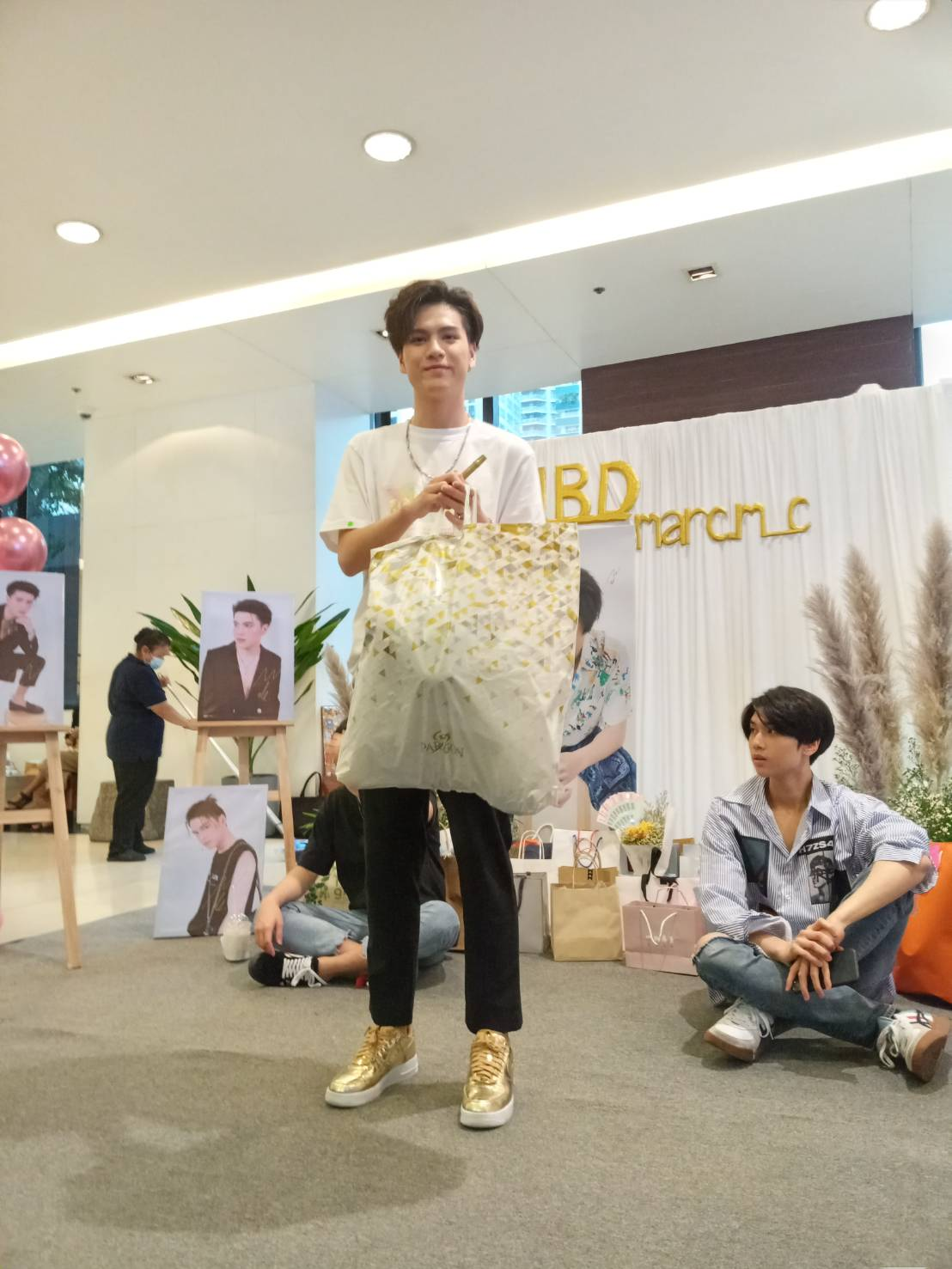
- Natarit in 2021
- Born: Pahun Jiyacharoen (ปาหุณ จิยะเจริญ); 27 March 2002 (age 24); Thailand
- Other name: Marc (มาร์ค)
- Education: Bangkok Christian College; College of the Assumption Bangrak; Srinakharinwirot University
- Occupation: Actor
- Years active: 2018–present
- Agent: GMMTV
- Known for: Itt in My Gear and Your Gown; Chain in We Are; Pond in Perfect 10 Liners
- Height: 1.8 m (5 ft 11 in)

Natarit Worakornlertsith (Thai: ณฐริศร์ วรกรเลิศสิทธิ์; born 2002), formerly Pahun Jiyacharoen (Thai: ปาหุณ จิยะเจริญ), nicknamed Marc (Thai: ธมาร์ค), is a Thai actor known for his roles in My Gear and Your Gown (2020), We Are (2024) and Perfect 10 Liners (2024).

== Early life and education ==
Natarit was born as Pahun Jiyacharoen on March 27, 2002. He officially changed in name in May 2023, sharing the announcement during an Instagram Live session.

He graduated from Srinakharinwirot University's College of Social Communication Innovation in 2024, alongside classmates and fellow GMMTV actors Kittiphop Sereevichayasawat (Satang) and Benyapa Jeenprasom (View), where he majored in Acting and Film Directing.

== Career ==
Natarit got his first main role in the 2020 boys' love series My Gear and Your Gown alongside acting partner Thanik Kamontharanon (Pawin). They continued to film more projects together as a pair in the coming years, including 55:15 Never Too Late, Our Skyy 2: PalmDiao and Dangerous Romance.

Due to the legal proceedings surrounding Pawin at the time of filming the TV series We Are, Natarit entered a new acting partnership with newcomer Poon Mitpakdee, filming both We Are and Perfect 10 Liners as a pairing. However, on August 19, 2025, it was announced both Natarit and Poon had parted ways as a pairing too, leading both of the to drop out of the lineup for A Dog and a Plane and for Natarit to gain a role in Dare You to Death instead.

== Filmography ==
=== Television series ===
Key
†	Denotes television productions that have not yet been released

Year	Title	Role	Network	Notes	Ref.
2018	Friend Zone	Umm	One 31	Guest role	
2019	Wolf	Mark	One 31	Guest role	
2019	Blacklist	Viking	GMM 25	Supporting role	
2020	My Gear and Your Gown	"Itt" Ittikorn Noppanaradol	WeTV	Main role	
2021	Bad Buddy	Louis	GMM 25	Supporting role	
2021	55:15 Never Too Late	Pruek	GMM 25	Supporting role	
2022	10 Years Ticket	Chalee	GMM 25	Supporting role	
2023	Chains of Heart	Hin	Channel 3	Main role	
2023	Past-Senger	"Bamee" Ekkawee	AIS Play	Main role	
2023	Our Skyy 2: PalmDiao	Kan	GMM 25	Supporting role	
2023	Our Skyy 2: PatPran	Louis	GMM 25	Supporting role	
2023	Dangerous Romance	"Guy" Koraphat	GMM 25	Supporting role	
2024	We Are	Chain	GMM 25	Main role	
2024	High School Frenemy	Pipe	GMM 25	Guest role	
2024	Perfect 10 Liners	Pond	GMM 25	Supporting role	
2025	MuTeLuv: Diva Deva Mata	Bank	GMM 25	Supporting role	
2025	Dare You to Death	Ken	GMM 25	Supporting role	
2026	Weirdo-101	Oy	One 31	Supporting role	
2026	Lovers & Gangsters	Din	One 31	Supporting role	
TBA	Blue Print †	TBA	TBA	Supporting role	

=== Music video appearances ===
Year	Title	Artist	Soundtrack	Label	Ref.
2020	"If You Tried to Be Me (ถ้าเธอลองเป็นฉัน)"	Arm Weerayut	My Gear and Your Gown OST	GMMTV Records	
2024	"นานตลอดกาล (We Are Forever)"	Phuwin Tangsakyuen	We Are OST	GMMTV Records	

== Discography ==
=== Singles ===
==== Soundtracks ====
Year	Title	Soundtrack	Label	Ref.
2024	"เรามีเรา (WE ARE)" with Pond, Phuwin, Winny, Satang, Aou, Boom and Poon	We Are OST	GMMTV Records	
2024	"แอบเพื่อน (Hidden Love)" with Poon Mitpakdee	We Are OST	GMMTV Records	

=== Concerts ===
Year	Title	Date(s)	Venue	Ref.
2024	We Are FOREVER Fancon	16–17 August 2024	True Icon Hall, Iconsiam	
2024	We Are FOREVER Fancon in Vietnam	14 September 2025	Hoa Binh Theater	
2024	GMMTV Starlympics 2024	21 December 2024	Impact Arena, Muang Thong Thani	
