= Hidden Agenda (TV series) =

2023 Thai television series

- Official series poster
- Thai: วาระซ่อนเร้น
- Genre: Comedy; Romance; Boys' Love
- Based on: วาระซ่อนเร้น by Dezair
- Screenplay by: Somchai Tidsanawoot; Wanna Kortunyavat; Ekarin Mungmee; Apichayar Sinithichayanon
- Directed by: Bundit Sintanaparadee
- Starring: Archen Aydin; Natachai Boonprasert; Thanaboon Kiatniran; Tharatorn Jantharaworakarn
- Opening theme: "หมดเวลาซ่อน (Hidden Agenda)" by Joong Archen & Dunk Natachai
- Ending theme: Same as opening theme
- Country of origin: Thailand
- Original language: Thai
- No. of episodes: 12

Production
- Executive producers: Sataporn Panichraksapong; Darapa Choeysanguan
- Producers: Noppharnach Chaiyahwimhon; Anuson Limprasert
- Production location: Thailand
- Running time: 48 minutes
- Production companies: GMMTV; Dee Hup House

Original release
- Network: GMM 25; YouTube
- Release: July 9 – September 24, 2023

Hidden Agenda (Thai: วาระซ่อนเร้น; RTGS: Wara Son Ren) is a 2023 Thai romantic comedy television series starring Archen Aydin (Joong), Natachai Boonprasert (Dunk), Thanaboon Kiatniran (Aou), and Tharatorn Jantharaworakarn (Boom). Directed by Bundit Sintanaparadee, the series was co-produced by GMMTV and Dee Hup House. It was first announced during GMMTV's 2023 "DIVERSELY, YOURS" event on November 22, 2022. The show aired from July 9 to September 24, 2023, on GMM 25 and GMMTV's official YouTube channel.

== Synopsis ==
Zo (Natachai Boonprasert), a fourth-year international relations student, has secretly admired his classmate Nita (Juthapich Indrajundra) for years. When he finally decides to confess, he realises he has no idea how to woo someone.

His friends suggest seeking help from Joke (Archen Aydin), a governance student and Nita’s ex-boyfriend, notorious for his temper and impatience. But as Joke offers advice, his true motives come into question.

Will Zo succeed in love, or will hidden agendas derail his plans?

== Cast and characters ==
=== Main ===
- Archen Aydin (Joong) as Joke Jiranai
- Natachai Boonprasert (Dunk) as Zo Sitang

=== Supporting ===
- Thanaboon Kiatniran (Aou) as Jeng (Joke's cousin)
- Tharatorn Jantharaworakarn (Boom) as Pok
- Chayapol Jutamas (AJ) as Kot
- Thanawin Teeraphosukarn (Louis) as Pat
- Juthapich Indrajundra (Jamie) as Nita
- Suphakorn Sriphotong (Pod) as Wave
- Sivakorn Lertchuchot (Guy) as Trin
- Weerayut Chansook (Arm) as Park
- Kirati Puangmalee (Title) as Puen (Ep. 7)
- Cong Duong as James / Poom (Ep. 6, 8)
- Puttipong Jitbut (Chokun) as Joke's younger brother (Ep. 12)

== Soundtrack ==
Title	Artist(s)	Ref.
"หมดเวลาซ่อน (Hidden Agenda)"	Archen Aydin & Natachai Boonprasert	
"อย่านอยด์ดิ (Your Smile)"	Archen Aydin	
