= Sarin Ronnakiat =

Thai actor (born 1995)

- สาริน รณเกียรติ
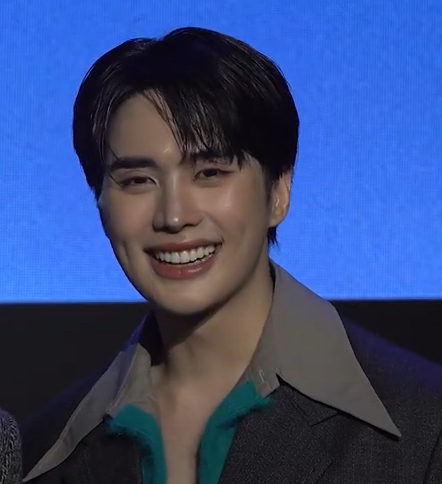
- Sarin in October 2023
- Born: Sarin Ronnakiat; 4 January 1995 (age 31); Bangkok, Thailand
- Other name: Inn
- Education: Chulalongkorn University (Faculty of Architecture)
- Occupation: Actor
- Years active: 2017–present
- Agent: GMMTV

Sarin Ronnakiat (Thai: สาริน รณเกียรติ; born 4 January 1995), nicknamed Inn (Thai: อิน), is a Thai actor and entrepreneur. He began his acting career in 2018 with a supporting role in Duang Jai Nai Fai Nhao and gained recognition for his leading roles in The Man Series: Pupa (2019), The Miracle of Teddy Bear (2022), Wandee Goodday (2024) and Memoir of Rati (2025).

== Early life ==
Sarin was born in Bangkok, Thailand. He is the middle son with two sisters. The family work in real estate.

He studied at the Bangkok Christian College, the Faculty of Architecture Architectural Design (International Program)/International Program in Design & Architecture, and Chulalongkorn University.

== Career ==
After graduation from university, Sarin entered the entertainment industry, starting as a Get 102.5 DJ. He later became an actor, appearing in Duang Jai Nai Fai Nhao.

In 2019 he appeared in the drama series The Man Series, the drama Thong Eak Mor Ya Tah Chaloang, and Fak Fah Kiri Dao. In 2023, he joined the production and talent agency GMMTV.

== Filmography ==
=== Television series ===
Year	Title	Role	Network	Notes	Ref(s)
2018	Duang Jai Nai Fai Nhao	Thanu	Channel 3		
2019	The Man Series: Pupa	Pupa	Channel 3		
2019	Thong Eak Mor Ya Tah Chaloang	Perm	Channel 3		
2020	Fak Fah Kiri Dao	Kiri	Channel 3		
2020	Kwam Song Jum See Jang	Dr. (Invited actor)	Channel 3	(Cameo, ep 16)	
2022	The Miracle of Teddy Bear	Taohu / "Nueng" Anon Thanakul / Prince Noi	Channel 3		
2024	Wandee Goodday	"Wandee" Laowatthana	GMM 25		
2025	Memoir of Rati	"Rati" Dier	GMM 25		

=== Concert ===
- Channel 3 Super Fan Live!: SUPERNOVA Universe Explosion Concert

== Hosting ==
Online

- 2020 : อยู่บ้านอิน On Air YouTube:StayINN
- 2020 : StayINN On Air YouTube:StayINN

== Recognition ==
- Kazz Awards 2019 Best “Cute Boy of the Years (2019)
