= We Are (TV series) =

2024 Thai television series

- Official series poster
- คือเรารักกัน
- Genre: Romantic comedy; Boys' love
- Based on: We Are…คือเรารักกัน by ภารวี
- Screenplay by: Rampha Phetchart; Utchariyakorn Sirikam; Inthira Thanasarnsumrit
- Directed by: Siwaj Sawatmaneekul
- Starring: Naravit Lertratkosum; Phuwin Tangsakyuen; Thanawin Pholcharoenrat; Kittiphop Sereevichayasawat; Thanaboon Kiatniran; Tharatorn Jantharaworakarn; Natarit Worakornlertsith; Poon Mitpakdee
- Opening theme: "We Are"
- Ending theme: "We Are Forever"
- Country of origin: Thailand
- Original language: Thai
- No. of seasons: 1
- No. of episodes: 16

Production
- Executive producers: Sataporn Panichraksapong; Darapa Choeysanguan
- Producer: Nuttapong Mongkolsawas
- Running time: 45-60 minutes
- Production companies: GMMTV; Studio Wabi Sabi

Original release
- Network: GMM 25; iQIYI
- Release: 3 April – 17 July 2024

Related
- We Are The Beginning

We Are (Thai: คือเรารักกัน; RTGS: Khue Rao Rak Kan) is a 2024 Thai boys' love television series, starring Naravit Lertratkosum (Pond), Phuwin Tangsakyuen, Thanawin Pholcharoenrat (Winny), Kittiphop Sereevichayasawat (Satang), Thanaboon Kiatniran (Aou), Tharatorn Jantharaworakarn (Boom), Natarit Worakornlertsith (Marc), and Poon Mitpakdee. Directed by Siwaj Sawatmaneekul, and produced by GMMTV and Studio Wabi Sabi, the series was announced at the GMMTV UP&ABOVE PART1 event on 17 October 2023. The series premiered on GMM 25 and IQIYI on 3 April 2024, airing every Wednesday at 20:30 (ICT, 8:30pm).

== Plot ==
We Are follows a close-knit group of university friends navigating art school, campus life, and falling in love.

== Cast and characters ==
=== Main ===
- Naravit Lertratkosum (Pond) as Khaopan known as Phum

Khaofang's younger brother

- Phuwin Tangsakyuen as Peeranat Rueangsiriwong (Peem)
- Thanawin Pholcharoenrat (Winny) as Nirandon Yodsavathin (Q)
- Kittiphop Sereevichayasawat (Satang) as Toey

=== Supporting ===
- Thanaboon Kiatniran (Aou) as Tan
- Tharatorn Jantharaworakarn (Boom) as Khaofang

Phum's elder brother

- Natarit Worakornlertsith (Marc) as Chain
- Poon Mitpakdee as Pun
- Rutricha Phapakithi (Ciize) as Fai

Prem and Q's classmate, Fang's ex

- Chayakorn Jutamas (JJ) as Matthew

Toey's friend

- Teeradech Vitheepanich (Tee) as Mick

Phum's friend

- Kirati Puangmalee (Title) as Kluen

Peem's interest

- Phanuroj Chalermkijporntavee (Pepper) as Beer

Phum's friend

=== Guest ===
- Weerayut Chansook (Arm) as Oh
- Tachakorn Boonlupyanun (Godji) as Pui
- Thanaboon Wanlopsirinun (Na) as Po
- Nattharat Kornkaew (Champ) as Ueai

== Soundtrack ==
| No. | Title | Artist | Length |
|---|---|---|---|
| 1. | "เรามีเรา" ("We Are") | Pond Naravit, Phuwin, Winny Thanawin, Satang Kittiphop, Aou Thanaboon, Boom Tharatorn, Marc Natarit and Poon | 3:31 |
| 2. | "นานตลอดกาล" ("We Are Forever") | Phuwin | 3:52 |
| 3. | "หมดมุก" ("Jokester") | Aou Thanaboon, Boom Tharatorn | 2:51 |
| 4. | "แค่ในวันนั้น" ("Truth In The Eyes") | Pond Naravit, Phuwin | 3:59 |
| 5. | "คิดถึงฉันใช่ป่ะ" ("Missing Me?") | Winny Thanawin, Satang Kittiphop | 3:13 |
| 6. | "แอบเพื่อน" ("Hidden Love") | Marc Natarit, Poon | 3:07 |

== Accolades ==
=== Listicles ===
Year-end lists for We Are
| Critic/Publication | List | Rank | Ref. |
|---|---|---|---|
| Teen Vogue | 13 Best BL Dramas of 2024 | Included | |

== See also ==
- List of BL dramas
