= Samantha Melanie Coates =

Thai actress (born 1995)

- ซาแมนท่า เมลานี่ โค้ทส์
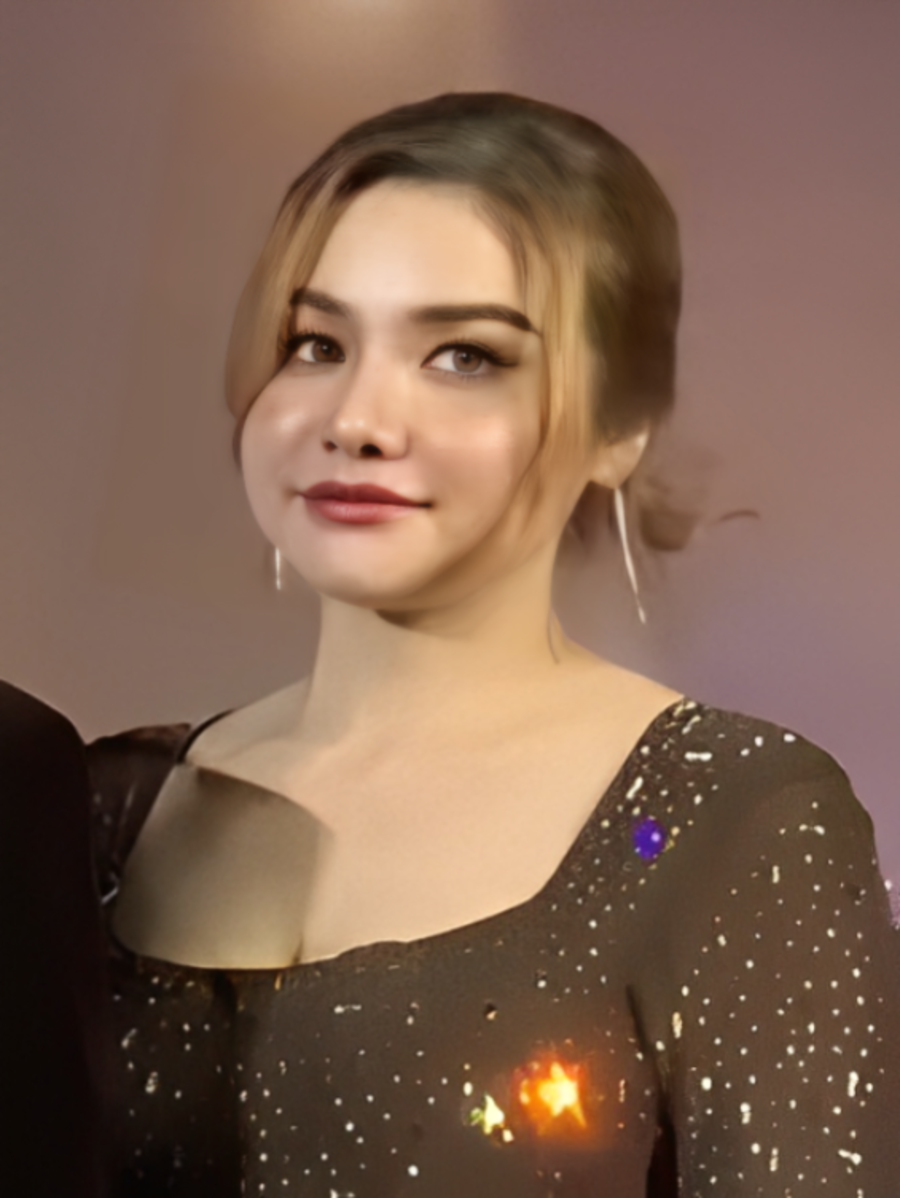
- Samantha in April 2025
- Born: 30 August 1995 (age 31)
- Other name: Sammy (แซมมี่)
- Education: Rangsit University
- Occupations: Actress; Internet celebrity
- Years active: 2014–present
- Agents: Studio Wabi Sabi (2018–2024); GMMTV (2024–present)
- Known for: Bow in Love by Chance; Cake in 2 Moons 2; Manaow in Until We Meet Again and Between Us
- Height: 170 cm (5 ft 7 in)

Samantha Melanie Coates (Thai: ซาแมนท่า เมลานี่ โค้ทส์; born August 30, 1995), nicknamed Sammy (Thai: แซมมี่), is a Thai-British actress and internet celebrity. She is known for her roles in Love by Chance (2018), 2 Moons 2 (2019), and Until We Meet Again (2019), as well as her comedy videos on Instagram and TikTok.

== Early life and education ==
Samantha was born on August 30, 1995, to a British father and a Thai mother. She completed her secondary education at Pattaya Arunotai School. After high school, she attended Kasem Bundit University Romklao Campus before dropping out, and later enrolled at Rangsit University, where she majored in digital marketing communication and branding at the College of Communication Arts in 2022.

== Career ==
Samantha made her acting debut in 2014 as Nan in the first season of Love Sick, a role she reprised in the second season (2015). She subsequently appeared in several popular boys love series, including Love by Chance (2018), 2 Moons 2 (2019), and Until We Meet Again (2019), while signed with Studio Wabi Sabi.

In 2020, she reprised her role as Bow in Love by Chance 2 and appeared in GMMTV's My Gear and Your Gown. She landed her first main role as Proud in the anthology series 7 Project (2021), featuring in a sapphic storyline alongside Pannin Charnmanoon (Pineare).

Following guest appearances in GMMTV's Star & Sky: Star in My Mind (2022) and We Are (2024), she officially joined GMMTV in 2024 after her contract with Studio Wabi Sabi expired.

Following her transition to GMMTV, she secured roles in various television series, including Fourever You (2024) as Mei Li and ThamePo: Heart That Skips a Beat (2024) as Ming. She subsequently appeared as Natcha in Us (2025), Bly in MuTeLuv: Hello, Is This Luck? (2025), and Sodchuen in Love You Teacher (2026).

== Filmography ==
Key
†	Denotes films that have not yet been released

=== Television series ===
Year	Title	Role	Notes	Ref.
2014	Love Sick Season 1	Nan	Supporting role	
2015	Love Sick Season 2	Nan	Supporting role	
2016	War of High School	Jessica	Supporting role	
2018	What the Duck	Nok	Supporting role	
2018	Love by Chance	Bow	Supporting role	
2019	2 Moons 2	Cake	Supporting role	
2019	Until We Meet Again	Manaow	Supporting role	
2020	Love, Lie, Haunt The Series: The Haunted Corpse	Noomnim	Supporting role	
2020	Love by Chance 2	Bow	Supporting role	
2020	My Gear and Your Gown	Host	Guest role	
2021	7 Project	Proud	Main role	
2022	Star & Sky: Star in My Mind	Mentor	Guest role	
2022	Unforgotten Night	Jin	Supporting role	
2022	Between Us	Manaow	Supporting role	
2023	Dinosaur Love	Plabu	Guest role	
2024	We Are	Fon	Guest role	
2024	Fourever You	Mei Li	Supporting role	
2024	ThamePo Heart That Skips a Beat	Ming	Supporting role	
2025	Us	Natcha	Supporting role	
2025	MuTeLuv: Hello, Is This Luck?	Bly	Supporting role	
2026	Love You Teacher	Sodchuen	Supporting role	
2026	Good Boy	Mai	Supporting role	
2026	Built in Love	Nan	Supporting role	
2026	Oxytoxin	TBA	Supporting role	
TBA	I Will Always Save You †	So	Supporting role	
TBA	Shooting Stars †	TBA	Supporting role	

=== Film ===
Year	Title	Role	Ref.
2023	Dinosaur Love: The Movie	Plabu	

=== Music video appearances ===
Year	Title	Artist	Ref.
2025	"พอใจ" (Dissatisfied)	Nanon	

== Discography ==
=== Singles ===
Year	Title	Label	Ref.
2024	"ไหนว่าโสด? (Liar)"	Studio Wabi Sabi	

=== Soundtrack appearances ===
Year	Title	Album	Label	Ref.
2014	"ยังทำไม่ได้"	Love Sick OST	BEC-Tero Entertainment	
2020	"อยากบอกเธอ"	Until We Meet Again OST	Studio Wabi Sabi	
2021	"แด่ความคิดถึง (Memory)"	7 Project OST	Studio Wabi Sabi	

== Awards and nominations ==
Year	Award	Category	Work	Result	Ref.
2020	Kazz Awards 2020	Hottest Female Teenage of the Year		Nominated	
2021	Kazz Awards 2021	Popular Female Teenage Award		Nominated	
2021	Siam Series Awards	Most Popular Supporting Actress	Love by Chance 2	Nominated	
