= Natachai Boonprasert =

Thai actor and singer (born 2000)

- ณัฎฐ์ฐชัย บุญประเสริฐ
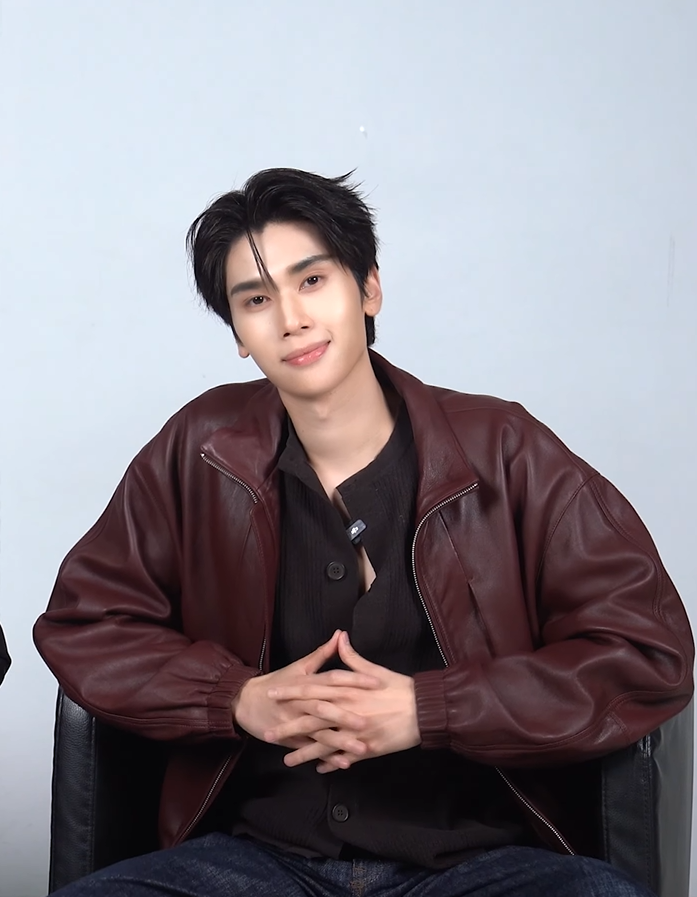
- Natachai in March 2026
- Born: 1 October 2000 (age 26); Bangkok, Thailand
- Other name: Dunk
- Education: King Mongkut's Institute of Technology Ladkrabang
- Occupations: Actor; singer
- Years active: 2021–present
- Agent: GMMTV
- Known for: Daonuea in Star & Sky: Star in My Mind; Zo in Hidden Agenda; Style in The Heart Killers
- Height: 1.85 m (6 ft 1 in)

Natachai Boonprasert (Thai: ณัฎฐ์ฐชัย บุญประเสริฐ; born 1 October 2000), nicknamed Dunk (Thai: ดัง), is a Thai actor and singer under GMMTV. He gained prominence for his leading roles in the television series Star & Sky: Star in My Mind (2022), Hidden Agenda (2023) and The Heart Killers (2024). Beyond acting, Natachai is also a singer and entrepreneur. He has released several songs associated with his television projects and is the founder of the clothing brand cloudis club (formerly Vespera) and the bakery brand Navori.

== Early life and education ==
Natachai was born on 1 October 2000 in Bangkok, Thailand. He has a younger sister. Dunk's mother was a flight attendant, and both his father and grandfather were pilots. Growing up, it was Dunk's dream to also be a pilot.

Dunk completed his primary and secondary schooling at Thailand's Heathfield International School. In 2023, he graduated with a bachelor's degree in Computer Innovation Engineering from King Mongkut's Institute of Technology Ladkrabang (KMITL), Faculty of Engineering International Programs. Dunk was a drum major during his time at university.

== Career ==
In 2021, Dunk was signed as an artist under the production and talent agency GMMTV after a talent scout noticed him on social media. Later that year he made his television debut with a small role in the series Bad Buddy, playing the main character's school friend.

In 2022, Dunk landed his first main role, playing Daonuea in the television series Star & Sky: Star in My Mind, alongside Archen Aydin. The series was well received, winning a Best Viu Award 2022 for Most Satisfying Series of the Year and ranking 5th inside the Viu Top 10 Awards 2022: Thailand Series. The series also has over 100 million total views on YouTube. Dunk would reprise his role as Daonuea in Star & Sky: Sky in Your Heart, Star & Sky: Special Episode, and in the 2023 anthology series Our Skyy 2.

In 2023, Dunk reunited with on-screen partner Aydin for television series Hidden Agenda. Dunk also participated and performed at GMMTV's Love Out Loud Fan Fest 2023: Lovolution that same year.

In 2024, Dunk became one of the new hosts of the long-running Thai variety show School Rangers. It was also revealed that he will star in two television series: Summer Night, in the role of White, and The Heart Killers, as Style.

On October 19, 2026, the acting partnership between Dunk and Joong was dissolved.

== Business ==
Natachai has his owned pastry business named Navori and a street-style clothing brand named cloudis.club (formerly Vespera).

== Filmography and discography ==
=== Television series ===
Key
†	Denotes television productions that have not yet been released

Year	Title	Role	Notes	Ref.
2021	Bad Buddy	Pran & Pat's high school bandmate	Guest role (Ep. 2, 4 & 12)	
2022	Star & Sky: Star in My Mind	"Dao" Daonuea Wattana-wattanachot	Main role	
2022	Star & Sky: Sky in Your Heart	"Dao" Daonuea Wattana-wattanachot	Supporting role	
2022	Star & Sky: Special Episode	"Dao" Daonuea Wattana-wattanachot	Main role	
2023	Our Skyy 2	"Dao" Daonuea Wattana-wattanachot	Main role	
2023	Hidden Agenda	"Zo" Sitang	Main role	
2024	Summer Night	"White" Thiwakorn Phonkitkamol	Main role	
2024	The Heart Killers	"Style" Sattawat Chayakorn	Main role	
2025	Revamp The Undead Story	Feratu	Guest role (Ep. 8-10)	
2025	Dare You to Death	"Khamin" Khananon Wiriyasak	Main role	
TBA	I Will Always Save You †	"Sharp" Komcharn Yuyangyuen	Supporting role	
TBA	Above Her Class †	TBA	Supporting role	

=== Variety shows (Note: Selected. Only solo guesting, or non promotional guesting with series cast.) ===
Year	Title	Role	Notes
2022	Safe House Season 3: Best Bro Secret	Fixed cast	7 days live streaming
2022	Arm Share	Guest	Ep. 97 (Home Tour)
2022	Talk with Toey: FreeForm	Guest	Ep. 70 (GMMTV Rookies Edition)
2023	Project Alpha	Panelist	Ep. 8
2023	Ploychom Play	Guest	Ep. 6
2023	Dara Lor Kan Len, what is this?	Guest	Ep. 39
2023	Hidden Hangout	Host	
2024	School Rangers	Host	

=== Music video appearances ===
Year	Title	Artist	Label	Ref.
2023	Reverse (จะเลิกกันอีกวันไหน)	Dunk ft. F.Hero	RS Music Thailand	

=== Soundtrack appearances ===
Year	Title	Label	Notes	Ref.
2023	"ท้องฟ้ากับแสงดาวและสองเรา (No More Empty Night)" (with Joong)	GMMTV Records	Our Skyy 2 OST	
2023	"หมดเวลาซ่อน (Hidden Agenda)" (with Joong)	GMMTV Records	Hidden Agenda OST	
2024	"รักแรงทะลุนรก (Fast Love)"	GMMTV Records	The Heart Killers OST	
2025	"ตื๊อเท่านั้นที่ครองโลก (Never Back Down)" (with First, Khaotung, Joong)	GMMTV Records	The Heart Killers OST	
2026	"แรงมาแรงกลับไม่โกง (Dare You To Love)" (with Joong)	GMMTV Records	Dare You to Death OST	
2026	"ไม่ค่อยได้พูด (Wordless)"	GMMTV Records	Dare You to Death OST	

== Live performances ==
=== Concerts ===
Year	Title	Artists	Venue	Notes
2022	Feel Fan Fun Camping Concert	Earth, Mix, Pond, Phuwin, Joong, Dunk	Union Hall, Union Mall	
2023	Charity Concert Smiling Hearts	BNK48, Joong, Dunk, Ada, Pond, Phuwin, Katherine Aliakseyeva with Russian Dance Academy Katyusha, Anzhela Tamazashvili, Irina Borisenko, featuring leading opera singer and winning dance performers	Thailand Culture Centre, Main Hall	
2023	Love Out Loud Fan Fest 2023: Lovolution	Earth, Mix, Ohm, Nanon, Pond, Phuwin, First, Khaotung, Joong, Dunk, Force, Book, Jimmy, Sea, Gemini, Fourth	Royal Paragon Hall, Siam Paragon	
2023	GMMTV Fan Fest 2023 Live in Japan	Earth, Mix, Ohm, Nanon, Pond, Phuwin, First, Khaotung, Joong, Dunk, Force, Book, Jimmy, Sea, Gemini, Fourth, Gawin, Krist, Perth, Chimon	PIA Arena MM	
2023	GMMTV Starlympic 2023	GMMTV Artist	Impact Arena, Muang Thong Thani	
2024	GMMTV Happy Weekend in Japan	Off, Gun, Tay, New, Earth, Mix, Pond, Phuwin, Force, Book, Joong, Dunk, First, Khaotung, Jimmy, Sea, Gemini, Fourth, Perth, Chimon	Tachikawa Stage Garden	
2024	Love Out Loud Fan Fest 2024: The Love Pirates	Earth, Mix, Pond, Phuwin, First, Khaotung, Joong, Dunk, Force, Book, Jimmy, Sea, Gemini, Fourth, Perth, Chimon, Winny, Satang	Impact Arena, Muang Thong Thani	
2024	GMMTV Fan Fest 2024 in Macau	Off, Gun, Tay, New, Boun, Prem, Earth, Mix, Milk, Love, Force, Book, Joong, Dunk, Jimmy, Sea, First, Khaotung,	Galaxy Arena, Macau	
2024	GMMTV Starlympic 2024	GMMTV Artist	Impact Arena, Muang Thong Thani	
2025	GMMTV MUSICON in Nanning	Krist, Nanon, Phuwin, Dunk, Sea, Fourth, Perth, LYKN	Guangxi Sports Center Gymnasium	
2025	The Heart Killers: Never Back Down Final Ep. Fan Party	Joong, Dunk, First, Khaotung, Ken, Paul	MCC Hall Fl. 4, The Mall Lifestore Ngamwongwan	
2025	Love Out Loud Fan Fest 2025: Lovemosphere	Earth, Mix, Boun, Prem, Pond, Phuwin, First, Khaotung, Joong, Dunk, Force, Book, Jimmy, Sea, Gemini, Fourth, Perth, Santa, Winny, Satang, William, Est	Impact Arena, Muang Thong Thani	
2025	GMMTV Starlympic 2025	GMMTV Artist	Impact Arena, Muang Thong Thani	
2026	GMMTV Fan Fest 2026 Live in Japan	Krist, Singto, Off, Gun, Tay, New, Boun, Prem, Pond, Phuwin, Joong, Dunk, Sky, Nani	Tokyo Garden Theater	
2026	JoongDunk Eyes On You Fancon	Joong Archen, Dunk Natachai	Union Hall, Union Mall	
2026	Love Out Loud Fan Fest 2026: Heart Race	Earth, Mix, Boun, Prem, Pond, Phuwin, Force, Book, Joong, Dunk, Jimmy, Sea, First, Khaotung, Gemini, Fourth, Perth, Santa, William, Est, Junior, Mark, Joss, Gawin	Impact Arena, Muang Thong Thani	
