= Kittiphop Sereevichayasawat =

Thai actor (born 2001)

- กิตติภพ เสรีวิชยสวัสดิ์
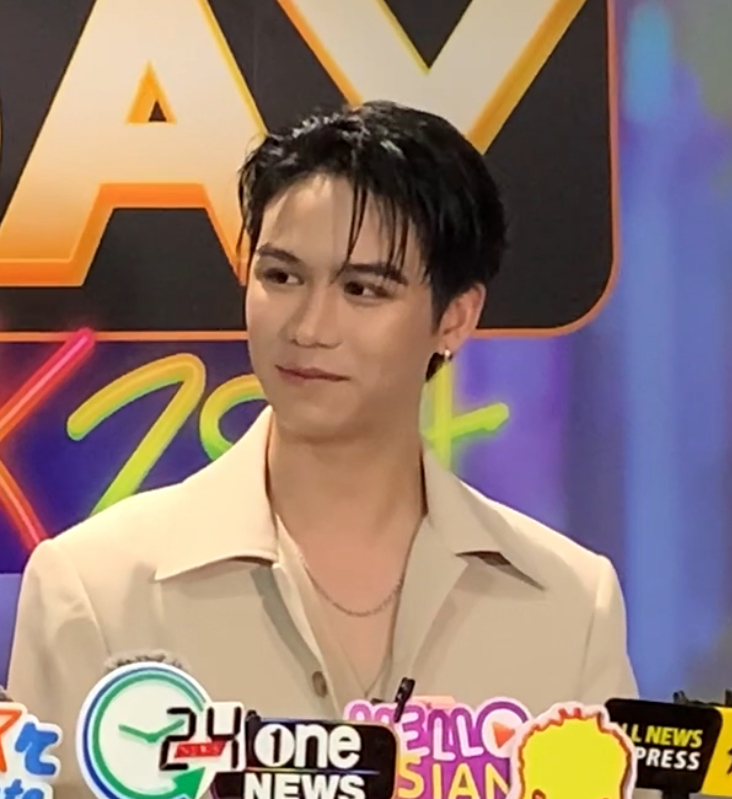
- Kittiphop in December 2024
- Born: 16 November 2001 (age 25); Bangkok, Thailand
- Other name: Satang (สตางค์)
- Education: Srinakharinwirot University
- Occupations: Actor; singer
- Years active: 2020–present
- Agent: GMMTV (2020–present)
- Known for: Sound in My School President; Toey in We Are
- Height: 178 cm (5 ft 10 in)

Kittiphop Sereevichayasawat (Thai: กิตติภพ เสรีวิชยสวัสดิ์; born 16 November 2001), nicknamed Satang (Thai: สตางค์), is a Thai actor and singer under GMMTV. He is known for his roles in My School President (2022), We Are (2024), and That Summer (2025).

== Early life and education ==
Kittiphop was born and raised in Bangkok, Thailand. He attended Suankularb Wittayalai School, an all-boys school in Bangkok. He graduated with bachelor's degree in Film and Digital Media from College of Social Communication Innovation at the Srinakharinwirot University.

== Career ==
Kittiphop started his career when he participated in the GMMTV's reality competition TV show Thailand School Star 2019. Although he did not win, he subsequently signed an exclusive contract with GMMTV.

In 2020, he made his acting debut by appearing in Bad Genius. in the same year he also appeared in The Gifted: Graduation. Following which he played various roles in GMMTV series Fish upon the Sky (2021), Bad Buddy (2021) and Star and Sky: Star in My Mind (2022).

He played the role of Sound, a member of the fictional band Chinzhilla, in My School President. In this series he was paired with Thanawin Pholcharoenrat (Winny), who portrayed Win. This on-screen pairing became a fan-favorite "ship", contributing substantially to his growing popularity. He also participated in several songs featured on the series' original soundtrack.

In 2023, GMMTV launched a fan meeting tour for My School President cast members, including him and Winny, with events held across Vietnam, Singapore, the Philippines, Taiwan and Cambodia. In the same year, he played as Pea in Double Savage (2023).

Following the success of My School President, he reprised his role as Sound in Our Skyy 2 (2023). He also got the main role of Pheem in Wednesday Club. On 17 October, during the GMMTV 2024 Up & Above Part 1 event, it was announced that he would star as Toey, the main character in the series We Are, alongside his My School President costar Thanawin Pholcharoenrat (Winny). In addition to acting, he contributed to various soundtrack projects.

After he played in We Are, he made a guest appearance as Sound in episode 11 of My Love Mix-Up! (2024), reprising his character from My School President. The 2024 GMMTV Fandom Characters project, he and Winny created Samruay, a mascot representing both of them.

He starred in his first lead role alongside Thanawin Pholcharoenrat (Winny) in romance drama series That Summer.

He appeared in the drama Cat for Cash, which was announced at the GMMTV 2025 Riding the Wave press conference.

In 3 March 2026, GMMTV announced he and Winny have mutually agreed to cease their work as a pair.

Satang is set to star alongside Tytan Teepprasan in the upcoming series Our Melodies.

== Other ventures ==
In 2023, he launched the apparel brand KUDO$.

== Filmography ==
=== Television series ===
Key
†	Denotes television productions that have not yet been released

Year	Title	Role	Notes	Ref.
2020	Bad Genius	Lin's students	Guest role	
2020	The Gifted: Graduation	Bomb	Supporting role	
2021	Fish upon the Sky	James	Supporting role	
2021	Bad Buddy	Pat and Pran's school bandmate	Guest role	
2022	Star and Sky: Star in My Mind	Sean	Supporting role	
2022	My School President	Sound	Supporting role	
2023	Double Savage	Pea	Supporting role	
2023	Our Skyy 2	Sound / Sean	Supporting role	
2023	Wednesday Club	Pheem	Main role	
2024	We Are	Toey	Main role	
2024	My Love Mix-Up!	Sound	Guest role	
2025	That Summer	Wave / Darwin	Main role	
2026	Cat for Cash	Leo	Supporting role	
TBA	Our Melodies †	Tungman	Main role	
TBA	Pie and the 7 Witches †	Sarut	Supporting role	

=== Stage ===
Year	Title	Role	Notes	Venue	Ref.
2026	The Love of Siam: The Musical	Ex	Supporting role	Muangthai Rachadalai Theatre, Esplanade Ratchada	

== Discography ==
=== Singles ===
==== Collaborations ====
Year	Title	Artist(s)	Notes
2024	"You're My Treasure"	Earth, Mix, Pond, Phuwin, First, Khaotung, Joong, Dunk, Gemini, Fourth, Perth, Chimon, Force, Book, Jimmy, Sea, Winny, Satang	Love Out Loud Fan Fest 2024
2024	"ขั้วตรงข้าม (Opposite)"	Winny Thanawin, Satang Kittiphop	

==== Soundtrack appearances ====
Year	Title	Artist(s)	Album
2022	"ไหล่เธอ (You've Got Ma Back)"	Fourth, Ford, Satang, Winny	My School President OST
2023	"ฟัง (Listen)"	Fourth, Ford, Satang, Winny feat. Lookwa Pijika	My School President OST
2023	"เพื่อนเล่นไม่เล่นเพื่อน (Just Being Friendly)"	Fourth, Ford, Satang	My School President OST
2023	"ง้อว (Smile Please)"	Fourth, Gemini, Ford, Satang, Winny, Mark, Captain, Prom	My School President OST
2023	"ถ้าไม่ใช่ (No One Else Like Me)"	Satang Kittiphop	My School President OST
2023	"รักษา (Healing)"	Gemini, Fourth, Ford, Satang	My School President OST
2023	"แค่ครั้งเดียว (Once Upon a Time)"	Fourth, Gemini, Ford, Satang	My School President OST
2023	"รักคู่ขนาน (Multi-Love)"	Gemini, Fourth, Winny, Satang, Mark, Ford	Our Skyy 2: My School President OST
2023	"มีกันไม่เหลือใคร (All or Nothing)"	Satang Kittiphop	Wednesday Club OST
2024	"แค่คืบ (A Step Closer)"	Satang Kittiphop	Last Twilight OST
2024	"เรามีเรา (We Are)"	Pond, Phuwin, Winny, Satang, Aou, Boom, Marc, Poon	We Are OST
2024	"คิดถึงฉันใช่ป่ะ (Missing Me?)"	Winny Thanawin, Satang Kittiphop	We Are OST
2025	"ปัญหาระดับชาติ (So Fly)"	Satang Kittiphop feat. Off Jumpol	Break Up Service OST
2025	"ใจฉันมีแค่เธอ (Belong with You)"	Winny Thanawin, Satang Kittiphop	That Summer OST
2025	"ดาวหลงทาง (Sea and Star)"	Satang Kittiphop	That Summer OST
2026	"ฤดูกาลที่มีเธอ (Season of You)"	Satang Kittiphop	When Oranges Fall OST

== Awards and nominations ==
Award nominations for Kittiphop Sereevichayasawat
Year	Award	Category	Nominee(s)	Result	Ref.
2023	Kazz Awards	Most Trending on Social Media	My School President	Won	
2023	Mint Awards	Breakthrough Cast of the Year	My School President	Won	
