= Sahaphap Wongratch =

Thai actor, model and singer (born 1998)

- สหภาพ วงศ์ราษฎร์
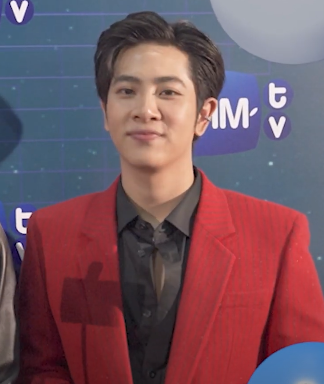
- Sahaphap in December 2021
- Born: 22 July 1998 (age 28); Lampang, Thailand
- Other names: Mix; Mixxiw
- Citizenship: Thai
- Education: Veterinary Science Chulalongkorn University
- Occupation: Actor
- Years active: 2020–present
- Agent: GMMTV
- Known for: Tian in A Tale of Thousand Stars; Muang Nan in Fish upon the Sky; Wen in Moonlight Chicken; Momo in Ossan's Love Thailand

Sahaphap Wongratch (Thai: สหภาพ วงศ์ราษฎร์; born 22 July 1998), nicknamed Mix (Thai: มิกซ์), is a Thai actor, singer. He gained recognition for his leading role as Tian in the series A Tale of Thousand Stars (2021). He further gained further prominence roles as Wen in Moonlight Chicken (2023) and Momo in Ossan's Love Thailand (2025).

== Early life and education ==
Sahaphap was born in Lampang Province, Thailand. He graduated and obtained a high school certificate from Bunyawat Witthayalai School. He can speak Northern dialect or Kam Muang, (Thai: กำเมือง) but in the series A Tale of Thousand Stars, he acted in the lead role as a boy from central Thailand, so he had to speak with the standard Thai accent. With his fame and reputation as someone originally from the northern area who can speak the northern dialect fluently, he is frequently asked by the media to speak his dialect during shows or interviews.

Sahaphap was a student at Chulalongkorn University in the Faculty of Veterinary Science. He entered into the Thailand entertainment industry when he was selected to be part of Chula Cute Boy and participated in the parade of the Chula-Thammasat Traditional Football Match, leading out the university flag during the parade.

Sahaphap had completed his entire course study in mid-2024 and officially celebrated his graduation Ceremony in October 2024 from Chulalongkorn University in the Faculty of Veterinary Science and got Second-Class Honours. Through his social media accounts, he has also started sharing glimpses of his professional life as a Vet at the clinic.

=== Beginnings ===
Sahaphap made his debut in 2018 when he began appearing publicly on television shows. He debuted in 2019 as an actor under GMMTV. He was a member of the boy band called Cute Chef Thailand, and its debut single was "Haguttokyuukyuu (มะงึก ๆ อุ๋ง ๆ)" In December 2021, he introduced a merchandise line called XIW. He also featured in a Star Wars x Pandora collaboration piece. Additionally, he became an endorser of some international brands (Lazada, Foodpanda and Burger King). In his guesting with GMMTV's online show, Arm Share in an episode about "Skin Care Sharing", aside from sharing the Skin care routine and products he uses, he also shared his other nickname which is @mixxiw, which adds to his name MIX, that name rotated to 180°, to became XIW, or "Mixxiw", which serves as his name for his merchandise line.

=== Rising popularity and breakthrough ===
Sahaphap's name became more popular in Thailand and across the world when he played the lead dramatic role in hit-Thai Boys' Love series A Tale of Thousand Stars as Tian, a rich man turned volunteer teacher in Pha Pun Dao, alongside Pirapat Watthanasetsiri (Earth) who played the role of Chief Phupha' He received positive reviews for his portrayal of Tian, which led to increased popularity and opened more opportunities for him. And because of his and Pirapat's perfect chemistry as a couple in the series, their fandom called them "EarthMix", derived from their respective names.

He played the role of Muang Nan, the kind-hearted, handsome second year student of the Allied Health Sciences Department in the Thai boys' love series Fish upon the Sky alongside Phuwin Tangsakyuen, Naravit Lertratkosum (Pond), Trai Nimtawat (Neo), and Thanawin Teeraphosukarn (Louis). On 26 June 2021, he had his first-ever digital fan meeting called Earth Mix: Love at First Live Fan Meeting along with his on-screen partner, Earth. He also featured in Fish upon the Sky Live Fan Meeting: A Sky Full of Fish alongside his fellow Fish upon the Sky lead stars.

In July 2023, Sahaphap shared that he is taking a short hiatus from acting to focus on completing his veterinary studies.

== Personal life ==
Sahaphap openly supports the LGBT community and LGBT rights, including the movement to legalize same-sex marriage in Thailand.

== Filmography ==
=== Television series ===
Key
†	Denotes television productions that have not yet been released

Year	Title	Role	Network	Notes	Ref.
2021	A Tale of Thousand Stars	"Tian" Sopasitsakun	GMM 25	Main role	
2021	Fish upon the Sky	Mueang Nan	GMM 25	Supporting role	
2021	55:15 Never Too Late	Himself	Disney+ Hotstar	Guest role	
2022	Cupid's Last Wish	"Win" Sawin Warodom	Disney+ Hotstar	Main role	
2022	Vice Versa	Veterinarian	GMM 25	Guest role	
2023	Moonlight Chicken	"Wen" Wongsakorn Thunapakarn	GMM 25	Main role	
2023	Our Skyy 2	"Tian" Sopasitsakun	GMM 25	Main role	
2023	The Jungle	Hunter	GMM 25	Main role	
2023	Only Friends	—N/a	GMM 25	Guest role	
2024	Ossan's Love Returns	"Wen" Wongsakorn Thunapakarn	TV Asahi	Guest role	
2025	Ossan's Love Thailand	"Momo" Hatainutt Nuntacharoensakul	GMM 25	Main role	
2025	The Ex-Morning	—N/a	GMM 25	Guest role	
2026	Only Friends: Dream On	"Dean" Dechakorn Prempreeda	GMM 25	Main role	
TBA	Cupid's Ghost †	Phut	TBA	Main role	
TBA	Love's Echoes †	TBA	TBA	Supporting role	
TBA	A Season to Remember †	Thiamthiwa	TBA	Main role	

=== Television show ===
Key
†	Denotes television productions that have not yet been released

Year	Title	Network	Notes
2016	I Can See Your Voice Thailand	Workpoint TV	Season 1, Ep 15
2020	เจนจัด ก๊อตจิก Jen Jud God Jig	GMMTV	Ep 16
2020	Arm Share	GMMTV	Ep 37, 54
2020	School Rangers	GMM 25	Ep 139–140
2020	เกมน้องกองพี่ Game Nong Gong Phi	GMMTV	Ep 3
2020	เจนจัด ก๊อตจิก Up Level	GMMTV	27 November 2020
2021	คุณพระช่วย Khun Pra Chuay	Workpoint TV	31 January 2021
2021	OffGun Fun Night	GMMTV	Special 3
2021	Talk with Toey	GMM 25	Ep 56
2021	Arm Share	GMMTV	Ep 59, 64, 76, 78
2021	School Rangers	GMM 25	Ep 157–158, 184–185
2021	Play ลิฟต์	GMMTV	Ep 2
2021	คู่มันส์ Funday 2021	True4U	Ep 2
2021	กระหายเล่า Krahai Lao	GMMTV	Ep 7, 9
2021	Safe House	GMMTV	
2021	Hollywood Game Night Thailand Season 5	Channel 3	Ep 34
2021–2022	EMS Earth-Mix Space	GMMTV	
2022	Safe House 3: Best Bro Secret	GMMTV	
2022	Arm Share	GMMTV	Ep 101, 113
2022	Talk with Toeys	GMM 25	Ep 74
2022–2023	School Rangers	GMM 25	Host
2022–2023	EMS Earth-Mix Space in Japan	GMMTV	
2023	Project Alpha Special	GMM 25	
2023	EMS Earth-Mix Space SS2	GMMTV	
2023	Project Alpha	GMM 25	Ep 7
2023	Talk with Toeys	GMM 25	Ep 104
2023	Arm Share	GMMTV	Ep 133
2023–2024	EMS Earth-Mix Space Special	GMMTV	
2024	School Rangers – Extra Chapter: Once Upon a Ranger	GMM 25	
2024	The Wall Song	Workpoint TV	Ep 201
2024	Pepsi Friend Feast Guide with Gemini-Fourth	GMMTV	Ep 9
2025	High Season แคมป์ซ่าฮาทุกฤดู Season 3 Winter	One 31, GMMTV	Ep 1-4
2025	Arm Share	GMMTV	Ep 174, 194
2025	Goodbye ตายไม่รู้ตัว	Workpoint TV	Ep 49
2026	ทศกัณฐ์ รันวงการ Tossakan Runs the Industry	Workpoint TV	Ep 1–2
2026	Based on 2 Stories	GMMTV	Ep 6
2026	Pepsi Friend Feast Guide with Gemini-Fourth Season 2	GMMTV	Ep 12
2026	Face Off	Workpoint TV	3 February 2026

=== Music video appearances ===
Year	Title	Artist	Label	Ref.
2021	"ครึ่งชีวิต (ทั้งจิตใจ)"	New Jiew	White Music	
2026	"ห้ามแต (No One Can)"; Only Friends: Dream On OST	Gawin Caskey	GMMTV Records	

== Discography ==
=== Singles ===
==== Collaborations ====
Year	Title	Label	Ref.
2022	"รับผิดชอบใจฉันด้วย (Love Response)" with Earth Pirapat, Sizzy	GMMTV Records	
2023	"Save All Memories in This House" with Earth Pirapat, Off Jumpol, Gun Atthaphan, Joong Archen, Dunk Natachai, Jimmy Jitaraphol, Sea Tawinan, Neo Trai, Louis Thanawin	GMMTV Records	
2024	"You're My Treasure" with Earth, Pond, Phuwin, Force, Book, Joong, Dunk, Jimmy, Sea, First, Khaotung, Gemini, Fourth, Winny, Satang, Perth, Chimon	GMMTV Records	
2026	"Love Feels So Fast" with Earth, Boun, Prem, Pond, Phuwin, Force, Book, Joong, Dunk, Jimmy, Sea, First, Khaotung, Gemini, Fourth, Perth, Santa, William, Est, Junior, Mark, Joss, Gawin	GMMTV Records	

==== Soundtrack appearances ====
Year	Title	Album	Label	Ref.
2021	"คนแบบไหน (What Kind of Person)"	Fish upon the Sky OST	GMMTV Records	
2021	"นิทานพันดาว (1000 Stars) [เธียร Version]"	A Tale of Thousand Stars OST	GMMTV Records	
2022	"พิ่งรู้ (Never Knew)" with Earth Pirapat	Cupid's Last Wish OST	GMMTV Records	
2022	"ไม่ไกลหัวใจ (Closer)" with Earth Pirapat	Cupid's Last Wish OST	GMMTV Records	
2023	"The Moon Represents My Heart" (Cover) with Earth, First, Khaotung, Gemini, Fourth	Moonlight Chicken OST	GMMTV Records	
2023	"ผาเคียงดาว (No Matter What)" with Earth Pirapat	Our Skyy 2 OST	GMMTV Records	
2024	"สะมะกึ๊กสะมะกั๊ก (Stuckling)" with Earth Pirapat (feat. Jennie Panhan)	Ossan's Love Thailand OST	GMMTV Records	
2025	"คนที่ตามหา (You Are My Best)" with Earth Pirapat	Ossan's Love Thailand OST	GMMTV Records	
2025	"ฝันในฝัน (False Awakening)"	Ossan's Love Thailand OST	GMMTV Records	
2026	"ปิดฉาก (Dejavu)" with Earth Pirapat	Only Friends: Dream On OST	GMMTV Records	
2026	"ไม่ยอม (All In)"	Only Friends: Dream On OST	GMMTV Records	
2026	"เอาเลยมั้ย (Let's Try)" Dream On Ver. with Earth, Joss, Gawin, Aou, Boom	Only Friends: Dream On OST	GMMTV Records	

== Fan meetings ==
Solo

Title	Date	Venue	Ref.
Beginning with You: Mix Fan Meeting in Shanghai	18 January 2026	Shanghai, China	

Joint

Title	Date	Venue	Notes	Ref.
A Sky Full of Fish: Fish Upon the Sky Fan Meeting	4 September 2021	TTM Live (Live stream)	With Fish upon the Sky cast	
Wonderful Day: EarthMix Fan Meeting in Vietnam	4 December 2022	Hoa Binh Theater	With Earth	
Opening Night: Moonlight Chicken	8 February 2023	Ballroom Hall 1–2, Queen Sirikit National Convention Center	With Moonlight Chicken cast	
GMMTV Fan Day 2 in Osaka	25–26 February 2023	Dojima River Forum	With Earth	
Moonlight Chicken Final EP. Fan Meeting	2 March 2023	True Icon Hall, Iconsiam	With Moonlight Chicken cast	
GMMTV Fan Day 3 in Seoul	22 April 2023	Guro-gu Community Center	With Earth	
EarthMix Fan Meeting in Taipei	13 May 2023	Original ATT Show Box Da Zhi	With Earth	
EarthMix Fan Meeting in Hong Kong	9 June 2023	Rotunda 2,3/F, KITEC	With Earth	
Fly to the Moon: EarthMix Fan Meeting in Vietnam	22 July 2023	The Adora Center	With Earth	
EarthMix Fan Meeting in Manila	30 July 2023	SM North EDSA Skydome	With Earth	
EarthMix Fan Meeting in Macau	6 January 2024	H853 Entertainment Place	With Earth	
Memories of You: EarthMix Fan Meeting in Vietnam	30 March 2024	Hoa Binh Theater	With Earth	
Destined Night: EarthMix Fan Meeting in Hong Kong	21 June 2024	Rotunda 2,3/F, KITEC	With Earth	
Ossan's Love: First-Eye-View	6 January 2025	SF World Cinema, CentralWorld	With Ossan's Love Thailand cast	
EarthMix Fan Meeting in Taipei	23 February 2025	Zepp New Taipei, Honhui Plaza	With Earth	
Ossan's Love Final EP. Fan Meeting	24 March 2025	Siam Pavalai Royal Grand Theater, Siam Paragon	With Ossan's Love Thailand cast	
Love Beyond Eternity: EarthMix Fan Meeting in Hong Kong	30 March 2025	Regala Skycity Hotel	With Earth	
GMMTV Fan Day 24 in Singapore	6 September 2025	D'Marquee, Downtown East	With Earth	
EarthMix Fan Meeting in Mexico	21 September 2025	Frontón Bucareli, Cuauhtémoc	With Earth	
Only Friends: Dream On The Play Begins	27 February 2026	Centralworld Pulse Hall, Centralworld	With Only Friends: Dream On cast	
EarthMix Fan Meeting in Berlin	22 March 2026	Estrel Hotel, Berlin	With Earth	
Only Friends: Dream On Final EP. Fan Meeting	15 May 2026	MCC Hall, The Mall Lifestore Bangkapi	With Only Friends: Dream On cast	
Only Friends: Dream On Americas Tour: Only Friends: Dream On in Mexico City	9 September 2026	Expo Reforma, Mexico City	With Only Friends: Dream On cast	
Only Friends: Dream On Americas Tour: Only Friends: Dream On in Lima	12 September 2026	Parque de la Exposición, Lima	With Only Friends: Dream On cast	
Only Friends: Dream On Americas Tour: Only Friends: Dream On in Brazil	14 September 2026	Teatro Renault, São Paulo	With Only Friends: Dream On cast	
GMMTV Fan Day 41 in Tokyo	13 February 2027	New Pier Hall, Tokyo	With Earth	

== Concerts ==
Title	Date	Venue	Notes	Ref.
GMMTV Fan Fest 2022: Japan	27–28 August 202$	Pia Arena MM	With Earth, Krist, Off, Gun, Tay, New, Bright, Win, Ohm, Nanon, Dew, Nani	
Feel Fan Fun Camping Concert	15 October 2022	Union Hall, Union Mall	With Earth, Pond, Phuwin, Joong, Dunk	
Love Out Loud Fan Fest 2023: Lovolution	24–25 June 2023	Royal Paragon Hall, Siam Paragon	With Earth, Pond, Phuwin, Ohm, Nanon, Force, Book, Joong, Dunk, Jimmy, Sea, First, Khaotung, Gemini, Fourth	
GMMTV Fan Fest 2023: Japan	9 October 2023	Pia Arena MM	With Earth, Ohm, Nanon, Pond, Phuwin, Force, Book, Joong, Dunk, Jimmy, Sea, First, Khaotung, Gemini, Fourth, Perth, Chimon, Gawin, Krist	
GMMTV Happy Weekend: Sunday Funday	25 February 2024	Tachikawa Stage Garden	With Gun, Pond, Book, Joong, Fourth	
Love Out Loud Fan Fest 2024: The Love Pirates	18–19 May 2024	Impact Arena	With Earth, Pond, Phuwin, Force, Book, Joong, Dunk, Jimmy, Sea, First, Khaotung, Gemini, Fourth, Winny, Satang, Perth, Chimon	
GMMTV Fan Fest 2024: Macau	12 December 2024	Galaxy Arena, Macau	With Earth, Off, Gun, Tay, New, Boun, Prem, Force, Book, Joong, Dunk, Jimmy, Sea, First, Khaotung, Milk, Love	
Love Out Loud Fan Fest 2025: Lovemosphere	17–18 May 2025	Impact Arena	With Earth, Boun, Prem, Pond, Phuwin, Force, Book, Joong, Dunk, Jimmy, Sea, First, Khaotung, Gemini, Fourth, Winny, Satang, Perth, Santa, William, Est	
Love Out Loud Fan Fest 2026: Heart Race	22–24 May 2026	Impact Arena	With Earth, Boun, Prem, Pond, Phuwin, Force, Book, Joong, Dunk, Jimmy, Sea, First, Khaotung, Gemini, Fourth, Perth, Santa, William, Est, Junior, Mark, Joss, Gawin	
Feel Fun Fan Party Concert	25–26 July 2026	Union Hall, Union Mall	With Earth, Boun, Prem, First, Khaotung	

== Awards and nominations ==
Award nominations for Sahaphap Wongratch
Year	Award	Category	Nominee(s)	Result	Ref.
2021	Thailand Master Youth	Artists, Singers, Actors	—N/a	Won	
2021	7th Maya Awards	Best Couple (with Earth Pirapat)	A Tale of Thousand Stars	Nominated	
2021	3rd Zoomdara Awards	Best Couple (with Earth Pirapat)	A Tale of Thousand Stars	Nominated	
2021	3rd Zoomdara Awards	Rising Actor	A Tale of Thousand Stars	Won	
2021	1st Siam Series Award	Best Couple (with Earth Pirapat)	A Tale of Thousand Stars	Nominated	
2021	1st Siam Series Award	Popular New Actor	A Tale of Thousand Stars	Nominated	
2021	1st Siam Series Award	Best Scene (with Earth Pirapat)	A Tale of Thousand Stars	Nominated	
2021	Kazz Awards 2021	Num Wai Sai	—N/a	Nominated	
2021	Howe Awards 2020	Best Couple (with Earth Pirapat)	A Tale of Thousand Stars	Won	
2022	Maya Entertain Awards 2022	Best Couple (with Earth Pirapat)	A Tale of Thousand Stars	Nominated	
2022	Maya Entertain Awards 2022	Male Rising Star	—N/a	Nominated	
2022	Kazz Awards 2022	Best Couple (with Earth Pirapat)	A Tale of Thousand Stars	Nominated	
2022	Kazz Awards 2022	Best Actor	A Tale of Thousand Stars	Nominated	
2022	Kazz Awards 2022	Rising Male Actor	A Tale of Thousand Stars	Won	
2022	Kazz Awards 2022	Num Wai Sai	—N/a	Won	
2022	Line Sticker Thailand Awards	Best Couple (with Earth Pirapat)	—N/a	Won	
2023	ContentAsia Awards	Best Asian LGBTQ+ Programme	Moonlight Chicken	Won	
2024	28th Asian Television Awards	Best Theme Song	"The Moon Represents My Heart"	Nominated	
2024	Maya TV Awards 2024	Supporting Actor of the Year	Find Yourself	Won	
2026	Japan Expo Thailand Award 2026	Actor Award (with Earth Pirapat)	—N/a	Won	
