= School Rangers =

2018 Thai television show

- Genre: Variety show; Game show
- Presented by: Nachat Juntapun; Weerayut Chansook; Leo Saussay; Kanaphan Puitrakul; Thanawat Rattanakitpaisan; Jiratchapong Srisang; Kasidet Plookphol; Archen Aydin; Natachai Boonprasert; Trai Nimtawat; Pakin Kunaanuwit; Sattabut Laedeke; Chayapol Jutamas; Chayakorn Jutamas; Thanawin Pholcharoenrat; Kittiphop Sereevichayasawat
- Country of origin: Thailand
- Original language: Thai
- No. of episodes: 339

Production
- Producer: Tachakorn Boonlupyanun
- Production company: GMMTV

Original release
- Network: GMM 25
- Release: 15 January 2018 – 28 September 2024

Related
- High School Reunion

School Rangers is a Thai variety and game show produced by GMMTV. Originally hosted by Nachat Juntapun (Nicky), Weerayut Chansook (Arm), Leo Saussay, Jumpol Adulkittiporn (Off), Atthaphan Phunsawat (Gun), Tawan Vihokratana (Tay), Thitipoom Techaapaikhun (New), Harit Cheewagaroon (Sing), Chatchawit Techarukpong (Victor), Tanutchai Wijitvongtong (Mond), Korapat Kirdpan (Nanon) and Wachirawit Ruangwiwat (Chimon). Nachat, Weerayut, Saussay, Kanaphan Puitrakul (First), Thanawat Rattanakitpaisan (Khaotung), Jiratchapong Srisang (Force), Kasidet Plookphol (Book), Archen Aydin (Joong), Natachai Boonprasert (Dunk), Trai Nimtawat (Neo), Pakin Kunaanuwit (Mark), Sattabut Laedeke (Drake), Chayapol Jutamas (AJ), Chayakorn Jutamas (JJ), Thanawin Pholcharoenrat (Winny) and Kittiphop Sereevichayasawat (Satang) served as the final hosts.

The show was previously titled as รถโรงเรียน School Rangers (lit. School Bus: School Rangers) to serve as a sequel of High School Reunion. It was premiered in Thailand on 15 January 2018 on GMM 25

The show is rebranded and renamed School Rangers, with the new set of show hosts and format. The first episode of the brand new season premiered on February 10, 2024.

== Hosts ==
=== Final hosts ===
- Leo Saussay
- Nachat Juntapun (Nicky)
- Weerayut Chansook (Arm)
- Kanaphan Puitrakul (First)
- Thanawat Rattanakitpaisan (Khaotung)
- Jiratchapong Srisang (Force)
- Kasidet Plookphol (Book)
- Archen Aydin (Joong)
- Natachai Boonprasert (Dunk)
- Trai Nimtawat (Neo)
- Pakin Kunaanuwit (Mark)
- Sattabut Laedeke (Drake)
- Chayapol Jutamas (AJ)
- Chayakorn Jutamas (JJ)
- Thanawin Pholcharoenrat (Winny)
- Kittiphop Sereevichayasawat (Satang)

=== Former hosts ===
- Jumpol Adulkittiporn (Off)
- Atthaphan Phunsawat (Gun)
- Tawan Vihokratana (Tay)
- Thitipoom Techaapaikhun (New)
- Harit Cheewagaroon (Sing)
- Chatchawit Techarukpong (Victor)
- Tanutchai Wijitvongtong (Mond)
- Korapat Kirdpan (Nanon)
- Wachirawit Ruangwiwat (Chimon)
- Nawat Phumphotingam (White)
- Pirapat Watthanasetsiri (Earth)
- Sahaphap Wongratch (Mix)
