= Archen Aydin =

Thai actor, model and singer (born 2001)

- อาเชน ไอย์ดึน
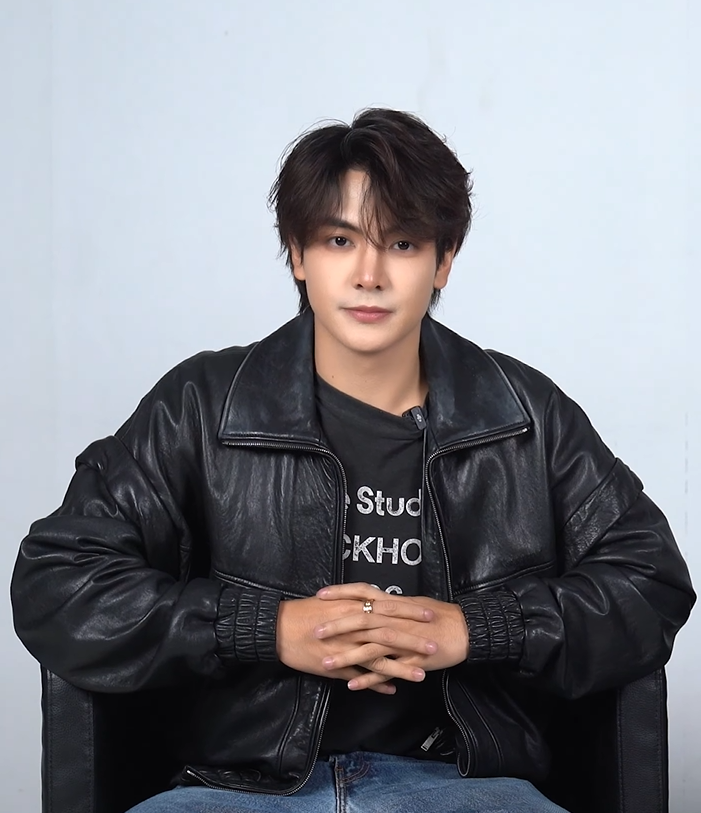
- Archen in March 2026
- Born: 10 March 2001 (age 25); Bangkok, Thailand
- Other names: Joong; Chen; Emre
- Education: Bangkok University
- Occupations: Actor; singer; model
- Years active: 2019–present
- Agents: Motive Village (2019–2021); Insight Entertainment (2021-2022); GMMTV (2024–present)
- Known for: Ming in 2 Moons 2; Khabkluen in Star & Sky: Star in My Mind; Joke in Hidden Agenda; Fadel in The Heart Killers
- Height: 1.86 m (6 ft 1 in)
- Musical career
- Genre: Thai Pop
- Instrument: Vocals
- Years active: 2020–present
- Labels: Motive Village (2020); Insight Entertainment (2021-2022); Riser Music (2024-present)
- Website: GMMTV Artists

Archen Aydin (Thai: อาเชน ไอย์ดึน; Turkish: Archen Aydın; born 10 March 2001), nicknamed Joong (Thai: จุง), is a Thai actor and singer under GMMTV. He gained recognition for his performances in popular Thai television series such as 2 Moons 2 (2019), Star & Sky: Star in My Mind (2022), Hidden Agenda (2023), and The Heart Killers (2024).

== Early life and education ==
Archen was born in Bangkok, Thailand but moved with his mother and stepfather to Turkey when he was eight years old. He lived in Turkey for ten years and can speak fluent Turkish.

He returned to Thailand after ten years to attend university, where he enrolled in Stamford International University in Bangkok to study Creative Media Design. In 2023, he changed his major and is currently studying at Bangkok University at the School of Communication Arts, majoring in Broadcasting and Streaming Media Production.

== Career ==
=== 2018–2020: Return to Thailand ===
After staying for 10 years in Turkey, Archen decided to leave his mother, stepfather, and his 3 younger siblings to return to Thailand. He had planned to finish his high school earlier than his peers back in Turkey in 2018 to help his family financially. Later, he entered a pageant, "Mister Teen Thailand," which he bagged the first prize crown.

In 2019, Archen started his acting career when he signed with the talent agency Motive Village and made his television debut in 2 Moons 2. Due to the success of the series, Archen along with the other main leads, participates in numerous events and fan meetings abroad.

The company announced that they will announce a boy band called "OXQ", which means "Ordinary X Quake," that consists of Pavel, Dome, Ben, Nine, and Joong. The group released their first digital single, "ME!" on 7 June 2020. The group presumably disbanded in 2020 after multiple ongoing controversies.

In 2020, Archen revealed that he had become an Insight Entertainment trainee, confirming his departure from both Motive Village and OXQ.

=== 2021–2026: New beginning and challenge ===
He was scheduled to compete in Asian Super Young as a trainee for Insight Entertainment. However, the show was cancelled because of COVID-19 before the recording began. He is returning empty-handed after months of learning Mandarin and practicing his singing and dancing skills. Joong, Pentor, Cheetah, Frank, and Samui released the pre-release single "I Like U Summer" as the Insight Rookies as a tribute to all of their supporters. Joong's contract with Insight Entertainment was terminated as a result of the show's termination. Archen made the decision to go independent in order to start over after his disappointments. He was considered fortunate because he eventually began to return to work in the industry.

Sometime around September 2021, he surprised fans by revealing that he was now signed to the production and talent agency GMMTV. Archen will be teamed with Natachai Boonprasert (Dunk) as his co-star in the series STAR & SKY: Star in My Mind and Sky in Your Heart as the primary leads for the first half of the series, according to the announcement made during the annual GMMTV series press conference, GMMTV 2022: BOARDERLESS. Mek Jirakit and Mark Jiratunin will work together as the main leads in the second half of the series. Later episodes feature occasional appearances of Joong's and Dunk's characters. This series only aired 8 episodes for each pair, but due to the surprising popularity of the series, they added an additional special episode that aired on 29 July.

His debut OST for the series "My Starlight" was also released. As a result of the series' success, JoongDunk gained widespread recognition in the Thai BL business. The English version of the OST, "My Starlight Eng. Vers," was later released as a thank you to fans for their encouragement and support during the series. On 23 August, GMMTV released the teaser for the "Feel Fan Fun Camping Concert." Later that day, a series, My Dear Donovan, released an OST sung by Joong. The FFF Camping Concert was scheduled on 15 October. For Joong, this is his first big-scale concert.

The annual GMMTV press conference, GMMTV 2023: Diversely Yours, was held on 22 November, as 2023 approached. Not only did Archen and Dunk obtain one series, Hidden Agenda, but they also took part in the project called Our Skyy 2. Following the conclusion of the series, the project brings together eight couples from the following series: My School President (GeminiFourth), Bad Buddy (OhmNanon), Star In My Mind (JoongDunk), ViceVersa (JimmySea), The Eclipse (FirstKhaotung), Never Let Me Go (PondPhuwin), and A Tale of Thousand Stars (EarthMix) for a follow-up. On 3 December, Archen and his co-star Dunk will hold their first-ever fan meeting in Cambodia to wrap up the year.

From the start of 2023 to its end, Archen attended events both domestically and overseas, attending several fan meetings throughout Southeast Asia. On 26 April, Joong and Dunk were able to release their two-episode series as part of the Our Skyy 2 project. Joong also performed alongside other artists at the GMMTV-organised concert, "Love Out Loud Fan Fest 2023: LOVOLUTION," which took place over two days on 24–25 June. On 9 July, the Hidden Agenda was scheduled to premiere. Their last series consisted of only 8 episodes, so this is their first full 12-episode series.

GMMTV teased the possibility of hosting their first-ever, large-scale fan event locally, GMMTV FANDAY in BANGKOK, on 8 August. Later, it was revealed that five couples EarthMix, ForceBook, FirstKhaotung, PondPhuwin, and JoongDunk will have fan meetings from 22 to 24 September. The fan meetings will last two hours each, with JoongDunk receiving two and a half hours because it was featured in the final episode of Hidden Agenda.

The most notable event abroad was when he made an appearance at the Women's Paris Fashion Week 2024 SS for the brand Saint Laurent on 26 September. Although this was Joong's first trip on the global fashion scene, it was actually his second invitation from the brand; the first time was an invitation to watch the show online.

Beginning in 2024, it was announced at the GMMTV 2024: Up & Above Part 1 press event that Joong would become the new host of the long-running variety show School Rangers and would star in the series Ploy's Yearbook.

On October 19, 2026, the acting partnership between Joong and Dunk was dissolved.

== Filmography ==
=== Television series ===
Key
†	Denotes television productions that have not yet been released

Year	Title	Role	Notes	Ref.
2019	2 Moons 2	Ming	Main role	
2022	Star & Sky: Star in My Mind	"Kluen" Kanaruj Wongthampanich	Main role	
2022	Star & Sky: Sky in Your Heart	"Kluen" Kanaruj Wongthampanich	Supporting role	
2022	The Warp Effect	Tony	Supporting role	
2023	Our Skyy 2	"Kluen" Kanaruj Wongthampanich	Main role	
2023	Home School	Amin (young)	Guest role (Ep. 12–13)	
2023	Hidden Agenda	"Joke" Jiranai	Main role	
2024	The Heart Killers	"Fadel" Kasemsan	Main role	
2024	ThamePo: Heart That Skips a Beat	Ice	Guest role (Ep. 2 & 7–10)	
2025	Dare You to Death	"Jade" Jaruwat Chotisuntrakul	Main role	
2026	Loveless Heroine	Plewkham	Main role	
2026	Our Melodies †	Khram	Supporting role	

=== Music video appearances ===
Year	Title	Artist	Label	Ref.
2020	"Long Trip (ต้น ธนษิต)"	Thanasit Jaturaput	GMM Grammy	
2022	"Not Bad"	Pixxie	Lit Entertainment	
2023	"Reverse (จะเลิกกันอีกวันไหน)"	Dunk ft. F.Hero	RS Music Thailand	
2024	"หมอไหน"	Namcha feat. Nutt Nisamanee	Warner Music Thailand	
2024	"Looking for Love"	Seya ft. Oak Soe Khant	Lil' Brat Records	
2025	"ไม่ใช่ที่รัก"	Num Kala	Genie Records	

== Discography ==
=== Collaborations ===
Year	Title	Label	Notes	Ref.
2022	"Save All Memories in This House" (with Off, Gun, Earth, Mix, Neo, Louis, Dunk, Jimmy, Sea)	GMMTV Records		
2022	"แล้วแต่ดาว (My Starlight) (English Version)" (with Dunk Natachai)	GMMTV Records		
2023	"Special Olympics Cheering Song" (with BNK48, Dunk Natachai, ADA)	Special Olympics Thailand		
2024	"ฉ่ำ (Charm)" (with Lykn, Pond Naravit)	Riser Music	LYKN 4th Single	
2024	"You're My Treasure" (with Earth, Mix, Pond, Phuwin, Force, Book, Dunk, Jimmy, Sea, First, Khaotung, Gemini, Fourth, Winny, Satang, Perth, Chimon)	GMMTV Records	Love Out Loud Fan Fest 2024	
2026	"Eyes On You" (with Dunk Natachai)	GMMTV Records		
2026	"Love Feels So Fast" (with Earth, Mix, Boun, Prem, Pond, Phuwin, Force, Book, Dunk, Jimmy, Sea, First, Khaotung, Gemini, Fourth, Perth, Santa, William, Est, Junior, Mark, Joss, Gawin)	GMMTV Records	Love Out Loud Fan Fest 2026	

=== Soundtrack appearances ===
Year	Title	Label	Notes	Ref.
2022	"แล้วแต่ดาว (My Starlight)"	GMMTV Records	Star In My Mind OST	
2022	"ถ้าเราไม่รู้จักกัน (If We Don't Know Each Other) "	GMMTV Records	My Dear Donovan OST	
2023	"ท้องฟ้ากับแสงดาวและสองเรา (No More Empty Night)" (with Dunk)	GMMTV Records	Our Skyy 2 OST	
2023	"หมดเวลาซ่อน (Hidden Agenda)" (with Dunk)	GMMTV Records	Hidden Agenda OST	
2023	"อย่านอยด์ดิ (Your Smile)"	GMMTV Records	Hidden Agenda OST	
2024	"เธอคือพรุ่งนี้ (My Tomorrow)" (with Earth, Jimmy, Toy, Mond)	GMMTV Records	Ploy's Yearbook OST	
2024	"เยียวยา (Heal)"	GMMTV Records	Ploy's Yearbook OST	
2024	"เจ้าความรัก (Hurt Me Please)"	GMMTV Records	The Heart Killers OST	
2025	"จีบได้มั้ย (Would You Mind?)"	GMMTV Records	ThamePo: Heart That Skips a Beat OST	
2025	"ตื๊อเท่านั้นที่ครองโลก (Never Back Down)" (with First, Khaotung, Dunk)	GMMTV Records	The Heart Killers OST	
2026	"แรงมาแรงกลับไม่โกง (Dare You To Love)" (with Dunk)	GMMTV Records	Dare You to Death OST	
2026	"ค้างคา (Doubt)"	GMMTV Records	Dare You to Death OST also credited for melody and lyric	

=== Composing and writing credits ===
Year	Artist	Title	Label	Credits	Ref.
2026	Krist Perawat feat. Nanon Korapat	ความคิดถึงที่ไม่จำเป็น (Friend Zone)	Riser Music	Composer & Writer	

== Live performances ==
=== Concert ===
Year	Title	Artist	Venue	Ref.
2022	Feel Fan Fun Camping Concert	Earth, Mix, Pond, Phuwin, Joong, Dunk	Union Hall, Union Mall	
2023	Love Out Loud Fan Fest 2023: Lovolution	Earth, Mix, Ohm, Nanon, Pond, Phuwin, First, Khaotung, Joong, Dunk, Force, Book, Jimmy, Sea, Gemini, Fourth	Royal Paragon Hall, Siam Paragon	
2023	GMMTV MUSICON in Tokyo	Krist, Nanon, Perth, Gawin, Phuwin, Joong, Gemini, LYKN	Zepp DverCity & Toyosu PIT, Tokyo	
2023	GMMTV Fan Fest 2023 Live in Japan	Earth, Mix, Ohm, Nanon, Pond, Phuwin, First, Khaotung, Joong, Dunk, Force, Book, Jimmy, Sea, Gemini, Fourth, Gawin, Krist, Perth, Chimon	Pia Arena MM	
2023	GMMTV Starlympic 2023	GMMTV Artist	Impact Arena, Muang Thong Thani	
2024	GMMTV Happy Weekend 2024	Off, Gun, Tay, New, Earth, Mix, Pond, Phuwin, Force, Book, Joong, Dunk, First, Khaotung, Jimmy, Sea, Gemini, Fourth, Perth, Chimon	Tachikawa Stage Garden	
2024	Love Out Loud Fan fest 2024: The Love Pirates	Earth, Mix, Pond, Phuwin, First, Khaotung, Joong, Dunk, Force, Book, Jimmy, Sea, Gemini, Fourth, Perth, Chimon, Winny, Satang	Impact Arena, Muang Thong Thani	
2024	Boun Bouncy Concert (Guest)	Boun Noppanut	Thunder Dome, Muang Thong Thani	
2024	LYKN Unleashed Concert (Guest)	LYKN	Thunder Dome, Muang Thong Thani	
2024	GMMTV MUSICON in Cambodia	Boun, Joong, Perth, Gemini, Fourth, Sea, LYKN	NABA Theatre, NAGAWorld2	
2024	GMMTV Fan Fest 2024 in Macau	Off, Gun, Tay, New, Boun, Prem, Earth, Mix, Milk, Love, Force, Book, Joong, Dunk, Jimmy, Sea, First, Khaotung,	Galaxy Arena, Macau	
2024	GMMTV Starlympic 2024	GMMTV Artist	Impact Arena, Muang Thong Thani	
2025	The Heart Killers: Never Back Down Final Ep. Fan Party	Joong, Dunk, First, Khaotung, Ken, Paul	MCC Hall Fl. 4, The Mall Lifestore Ngamwongwan	
2025	Love Out Loud Fan Fest 2025: Lovemosphere	Earth, Mix, Boun, Prem, Pond, Phuwin, First, Khaotung, Joong, Dunk, Force, Book, Jimmy, Sea, Gemini, Fourth, Perth, Santa, Winny, Satang, William, Est	Impact Arena, Muang Thong Thani	
2025	GMMTV Starlympic 2025	GMMTV Artist	Impact Arena, Muang Thong Thani	
2026	RISER Concert: The First Rise	RISER MUSIC Artist	Impact Arena, Muang Thong Thani	
2026	GMMTV Fan Fest 2026 Live in Japan	Krist, Singto, Off, Gun, Tay, New, Boun, Prem, Pond, Phuwin, Joong, Dunk, Sky, Nani	Tokyo Garden Theater	
2026	JoongDunk Eyes on You Fancon	Joong Archen, Dunk Natachai	Union Hall, Union Mall	
2026	Love Out Loud Fan Fest 2026: The Heart Race	Earth, Mix, Boun, Prem, Pond, Phuwin, Force, Book, Joong, Dunk, Jimmy, Sea, First, Khaotung, Gemini, Fourth, Perth, Santa, William, Est, Junior, Mark, Joss, Gawin	Impact Arena, Muang Thong Thani	
2026	GMMTV FAN FEST 2026 IN MACAU	Boun, Prem, Pond, Phuwin, Joong, Dunk, Jimmy, Sea, Gemini, Fourth, Perth, Santa, Almong, Progress	The Venetian Cotai Expo Hall , Macau	
2026	OH MY FOURTH CONCERT (Guest)	Nattawat Jirochtikul	BITEC LIVE	

=== Fan meeting ===
Year	Title	Artist	Venue	Ref.
2022	Star In My Mind Final EP Fan Meeting	Joong, Dunk, Louis, Pepper, JJ, Winny, Thor, Pawin, Satang, View, Ciize, Earn, Mek, Mark	Siam Pavalai Theatre, 6th Floor, Siam Paragon	
2022	JoongDunk 1st Fan Meeting in Cambodia	Joong Archen, Dunk Natachai	Major Cineplex by Smart Aeon 2, Phnom Penh	
2023	JoongDunk Shining in Vietnam	Joong Archen, Dunk Natachai	Gala Center, Ho Chi Minh City	
2023	GMMTV Fanday 3 In Seoul: JoongDunk 1st Fan Meeting In Seoul	Joong Archen, Dunk Natachai	Guro-gu Community Center, Seoul	
2023	GMMTV Fanday 4 In Osaka: JoongDunk Show	Joong Archen, Dunk Natachai	Dojima River Forum, Osaka	
2023	Joong Dunk: Back to Memories in Vietnam	Joong Archen, Dunk Natachai	The Adora Center, Ho Chi Minh City	
2023	GMMTV Fanday in Bangkok	Joong Archen, Dunk Natachai	Union Hall, Union Mall	
2023	Joong Dunk Love (Hidden) Agenda Fan Meeting In Cambodia	Joong Archen, Dunk Natachai	Aeon Hall, Aeon Mall Sen Sok (Aeon2)	
2023	GMMTV Fan-event in Tokyo	Joong, Dunk, Jimmy, Sea	Animate Ikebukuro Flagship Store	
2023	Joong Dunk 1st Fan Meeting In Taipei	Joong, Dunk	Legacy Taipei	
2023	Fanday 8 in Manila	Joong, Dunk, Jimmy, Sea	The Podium Hal, Philippines	
2024	JoongDunk 1st Fan Meeting in Hong Kong Love Agenda	Joong, Dunk	KITEC Rotunda 3	
2024	Joong 1st Fan Sign in China		Gunagzhou, China	
2024	Fanday 15 in Singapore	Joong, Dunk, Singto, Krist, Milk, Love	GV Max VivoCity	
2024	Joong "Your Smile" 1st Solo Fan Meeting		Hall A Grand Ballroom LUXUS, MGK Kemayoran, Jakarta	
2024	The Heart Killers: Love at First Kill	Joong, Dunk, First, Khaotung	Siam Pavalai Royal Grand Theater, Siam Paragon	
2025	Celebrate Spring with Joong Fansign in China		Guangzhou, China	
2025	The Heart Killers Fan Meeting in Vietnam	Joong, Dunk, First, Khaotung	District 10 Culture Centre	
2025	The Heart Killers Fan Meeting in Macao	Joong, Dunk, First, Khaotung	The Venetian Theatre, The Venetian Macao	
2025	The Heart Killers US & LATAM Tour	Joong, Dunk, First, Khaotung	Mexico City, Mexico & New York, USA	
2025	The Heart Killers Fan Meeting in Manila	Joong, Dunk, First, Khaotung	Up Theater, Manila, Philippines	
2025	The Heart Killers Fan Meeting in Osaka	Joong, Dunk, First, Khaotung	Cool Japan Park Osaka WW Hall	
2025	JIB Dream Fanmeet 5	Joong, Dunk. Earth, Mix, First, Khaotung, Perth, Santa	Hilton Rome Airport Hotel	
2025	The Heart Killers Fanday 24 in Singapore	Joong, Dunk, First, Khaotung	D'Marque @Downtown East	
2025	Sun and Moon with You Joong Fan Sign in Guangzhou		Guangzhou, China	
2025	Fall in Love with Joong Archen Fan Sign in Zhejiang		Zhejiang, China	
2025	Dare You to Death: The Case Opens	Joong, Dunk	Siam Pavalai Theatre, 6th Floor, Siam Paragon	
2026	Joong Dunk Fan Meeting in Seoul with Jaidee	Joong, Dunk, Jaidee	Yearimdong Art Hall, Seoul	
2026	Dare You to Death Final EP Fan Meeting	Joong, Dunk, Ohm Thipakorn, Chimon, June, Sing Harit, Pahn, AUngpao, Ashi, Prom, Earn	Siam Pavalai Theatre, 6th Floor, Siam Paragon	
2026	Joong Archen Fan Sign in Guangzhou		Guangzhou, China	
2026	Hidden Heart in Ho Chi Minh City	Joong, Dunk	C30, Hao Binh, Cultural Centre	
2026	GMMTV Fanday 31 in Taipei	Joong, Dunk, Force, Book	Zepp New Taipei	
2026	FSLucky with Joong		China	
2026	Joong 1st Solo Fan Meeting in Kuala Lumpur		JioSpace, Malaysia	

== Awards and nominations ==
Award nominations for Archen Aydin
Year	Award	Category	Nominee(s)	Result	Ref.
2020	14th Kazz Awards	Male Teenager of the Year		Won	
2020	14th Kazz Awards	Imaginary Couple of the Year	with Kornchid Boonsathipakdee	Nominated	
2022	Thailand Digital Awards 2022	Couple of the Year	with Natachai Boonprasert	Won	
2023	19th Kom Chad Luek Awards	Most Popular Y Couple	with Natachai Boonprasert	Nominated	(Note: Star and Sky: Star In My Mind was also nominated for Most Popular Thai Series.)
2023	Kazz Awards 2023	Couple of the Year	with Natachai Boonprasert	Nominated	
2024	Lifestyle Asia Thailand 50 Icons	Idol Icons		Won	
2026	#legend100	New Face		Won	
2026	#legend100	The Rising Force Awards		Won	
