= Kanaphan Puitrakul =

Thai actor, model and host (born 1998)

- คณพันธ์ ปุ้ยตระกูล
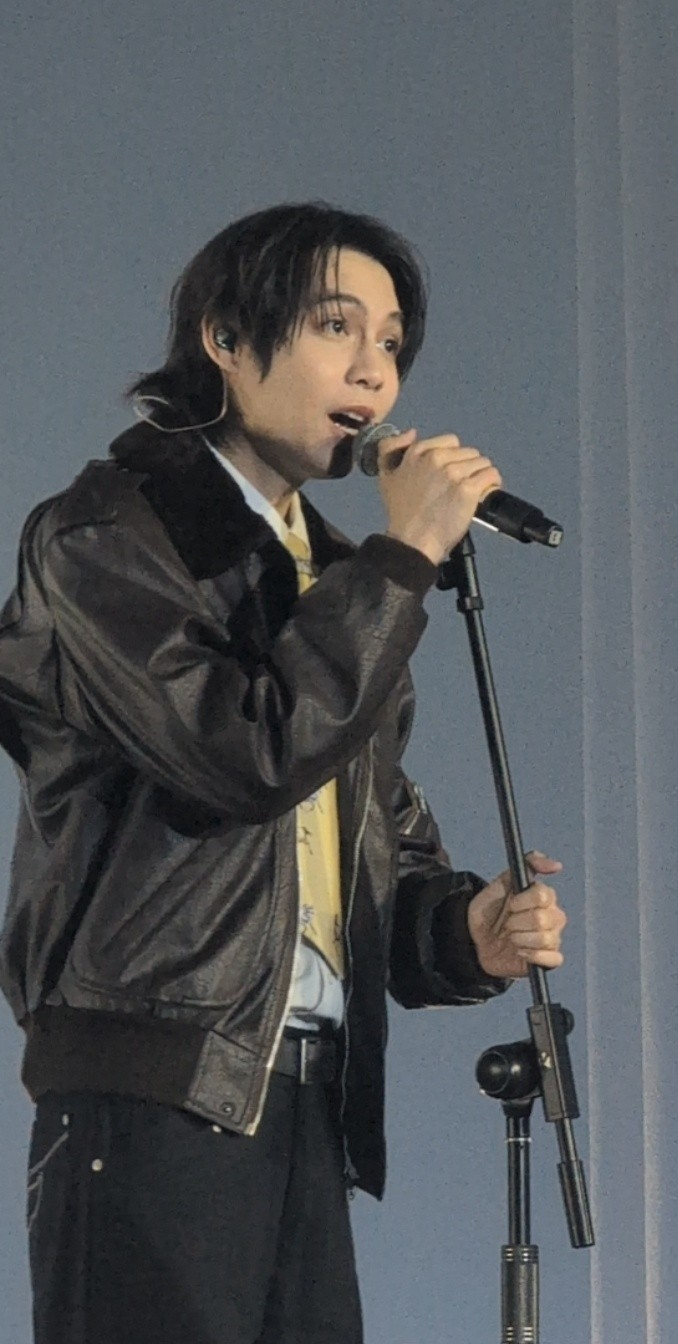
- Kanaphan at The Heart Killers Fan Meeting in Manila in July 2025
- Born: 3 September 1998 (age 28); Bangkok, Thailand
- Other name: First
- Education: Srinakharinwirot University
- Occupations: Actor; Model; Host
- Years active: 2016–present
- Agent: GMMTV
- Known for: Ryu in Wake Up Ladies: The Series; Ryo in Wolf; Jim Bae in Blacklist; Kim in The Shipper; Yok in Not Me; Poi in Astrophile; Akk in The Eclipse; Alan in Moonlight Chicken; Sand in Only Friends; Kant in The Heart Killers; Karn in My Magic Prophecy
- Height: 185 cm (6 ft 1 in)

Kanaphan Puitrakul (Thai: คณพันธ์ ปุ้ยตระกูล; born 3 September 1998), nicknamed First (Thai: เฟิร์ส), is a Thai actor, singer and television host under GMMTV. He is best known for his roles in the seriesThe Eclipse (2022), Only Friends (2023), The Heart Killers (2024) and Cat for Cash (2026).

== Early life and education ==
Kanaphan was born and raised in Bangkok, Thailand. He has an older and a younger brother. His parents nicknamed him "First", so that he could achieve many things in his life. He completed his secondary education at Suankularb Wittayalai School. In 2021, he graduated with second-class honours from Srinakharinwirot University, with a bachelor's degree in Cyber Business Management.

== Career ==
In 2016, Kanaphan started his acting career at the age of eighteen. He auditioned for The Assassin (ฆาตกร), a movie produced for Children's Day, and was selected for the main role out of a pool of 100 teenagers. In 2017, he participated in the "Cool Man Good Man" competition and entered the top 4. Later that year, he was hired by KA Cosmetics, together with Poompat Iam-samang (Up), for a yaoi television advertisement which went viral years later.

In 2018, he joined the production and talent agency GMMTV and made his television debut with a supporting role in Wake Up Ladies: The Series. In the same year, he became one of the hosts of GMM25's popular travel-based show Toe Laew. In 2020, he reprised his role as host in the show's second season. First has been a regular guest and main host (since 2022) on Thai variety and game show School Rangers.

In 2019, Kanaphan had a main role in the series Wolf and Blacklist. The following year, he starred in The Shipper and reprised his role as Ryu in the sequel series Wake Up Ladies: Very Complicated. In 2021 he played the role of Yok in Not Me. Arguably his breakout role.

In 2022, Kanaphan became an official pair with his real-life best friend Thanawat Rattanakitpaisan (Khaotung). They starred together in The Eclipse (Thai TV series). The series won multiple awards and was named one of Teen Vogue's best BL Series of the year 2022. In the same year, First had supporting roles in F4 Thailand: Boys Over Flowers and Astrophile. He also had a small role in the Netflix movie The Lost Lotteries.

In 2023, Kanaphan starred as Alan in the Moonlight Chicken. The show won Best LGBTQ+ Programme Made in Asia at the Content Asia Awards 2023. He also reprised his role as Akk in Our Skyy 2. For the series, First and co-star Khaotung Thanawat Rattanakitpaisan, released the single ฟังดีดี (Your World, My World) under GMMTV Records. Later in 2023, he played Sand in the ensemble series Only Friends.

In 2024, Kanaphan starred as Kant opposite Khaotung in the series The Heart Killers, which also starred Archen Aydin (Joong) and Natachai Boonprasert (Dunk) in lead roles. It was the number one watched series on streaming service iQIYI while airing. The cast is currently having fan meetings around the world.

In 2026, he appeared in Ossan's Love Thailand and My Magic Prophecy. He also starred as Tiger in the series Cat for Cash, opposite Khaotung.

Kanaphan has participated in the GMMTV two-day concert Love Out Loud Fan Fest in both 2023 and 2024. He will also appear in the 2025 edition.

== Public image ==
Kanaphan has his own clothing brand called Momento. By September 2025, he had over 3.6 million followers on Instagram and 1.9 million followers on X.

== Filmography ==
=== Film ===
| Year | Title | Role | Notes | Ref. |
|---|---|---|---|---|
| 2016 | The Assassin: ฆาตกร | Younger brother | Main role | |
| 2022 | The Lost Lotteries | Great | Guest role | |

=== Television ===
Key
| † | Denotes television productions that have not yet been released |

| Year | Title | Role | Notes | Ref. |
|---|---|---|---|---|
| 2018 | Wake Up Ladies: The Series | Ryu | Supporting role | |
| 2019 | Toe Laew Season 1 | Himself | Main host | |
| 2019 | Wolf | Ryo | Main role | |
| 2019 | Blacklist | Jim Bae | Main role | |
| 2020 | The Shipper | "Kim" Kimhan Dhamrong-rattanaroj / Pan | Main role | |
| 2020 | Toe Laew Season 2 | Himself | Main host | |
| 2020 | Wake Up Ladies: Very Complicated | Ryu | Supporting role | |
| 2021 | Not Me | Yok | Supporting role | |
| 2021 | F4 Thailand: Boys Over Flowers | Phupha | Guest role (Ep. 1, 6, 11) | |
| 2022 | The Eclipse | Akk | Main role | |
| 2022 | Astrophile | Poi | Supporting role | |
| 2023 | Moonlight Chicken | "Alan" Anantachai Lertwongsa | Supporting role | |
| 2023 | Our Sky 2 | Akk | Main role | |
| 2023 | Only Friends | Sand | Main role | |
| 2024 | The Heart Killers | "Kant" Pattanawat | Main role | |
| 2025 | Ossan's Love Thailand | Alone (Heng's university mentee) | Guest role (Ep. 2, 11) | |
| 2025 | My Magic Prophecy | "Karn" Siriphatthanaroj | Supporting role | |
| 2026 | Cat for Cash | Tiger | Main role | |
| 2026 | Only Friends: Dream On | Sand | Guest role (Ep. 1, 6, 12) | |
| TBA | The Invisible Dragon † | Earn | Main role | |
| TBA | A Season to Remember † | Punmarut | Main role | |

== Discography ==
=== Singles ===
==== Collaborations ====
| Year | Title | Label | Notes | Ref. |
|---|---|---|---|---|
| 2024 | "You're My Treasure" (with Earth, Mix, Pond, Phuwin, Khaotung, Joong, Dunk, Gemini, Fourth, Perth, Chimon, Force, Book, Jimmy, Sea, Winny, Satang) | GMMTV Records | Love Out Loud Fan Fest 2024 | |
| 2026 | "Love Feels So Fast" (with Earth, Mix, Pond, Phuwin, Khaotung, Joong, Dunk, Gemini, Fourth, Perth, Santa, Force, Book, Jimmy, Sea, Boun, Prem, William, Est, Junior, Mark, Joss, Gawin) | GMMTV Records | Love Out Loud Fan Fest 2026 | |

==== Soundtrack appearances ====
| Year | Title | Album | Label | Ref. |
|---|---|---|---|---|
| 2023 | "The Moon Represents My Heart" (Cover) (with Earth, Mix, Khaotung, Gemini, Fourth) | Moonlight Chicken OST | GMMTV Records | |
| 2023 | "ฟังดีดี (Your World, My World)" (with Khaotung Thanawat) | Our Skyy 2 OST | GMMTV Records | |
| 2025 | "เชื้อเพลิง (My Fuel)" | The Heart Killers OST | GMMTV Records | |
| 2025 | "ตื๊อเท่านั้นที่ครองโลก (Never Back Down)" (with Khaotung, Joong, Dunk) | The Heart Killers OST | GMMTV Records | |
| 2026 | "บ้านของหัวใจ (Found My Home)" (with Khaotung Thanawat) | Cat for Cash OST | GMMTV Records | |

== Awards and nominations ==
Award nominations for Kanaphan Puitrakul
| Year | Award | Category | Nominee(s) | Result | Ref. |
|---|---|---|---|---|---|
| 2022 | Thailand Digital Awards | Best Y Series Award | "The Eclipse" (with Khaotung Thanawat) | Won | |
| 2024 | 28th Asian Television Awards | Best Theme Song | "The Moon Represents My Heart" | Nominated | |
| 2024 | Thai Headlines Person of the Year Awards | Most Beloved On-Screen Duo of the Year (with Khaotung Thanawat) | | Won | |
