= Thanawat Ratanakitpaisan =

Thai actor (born 1998)

- ธนวัฒน์ รัตนกิจไพศาล
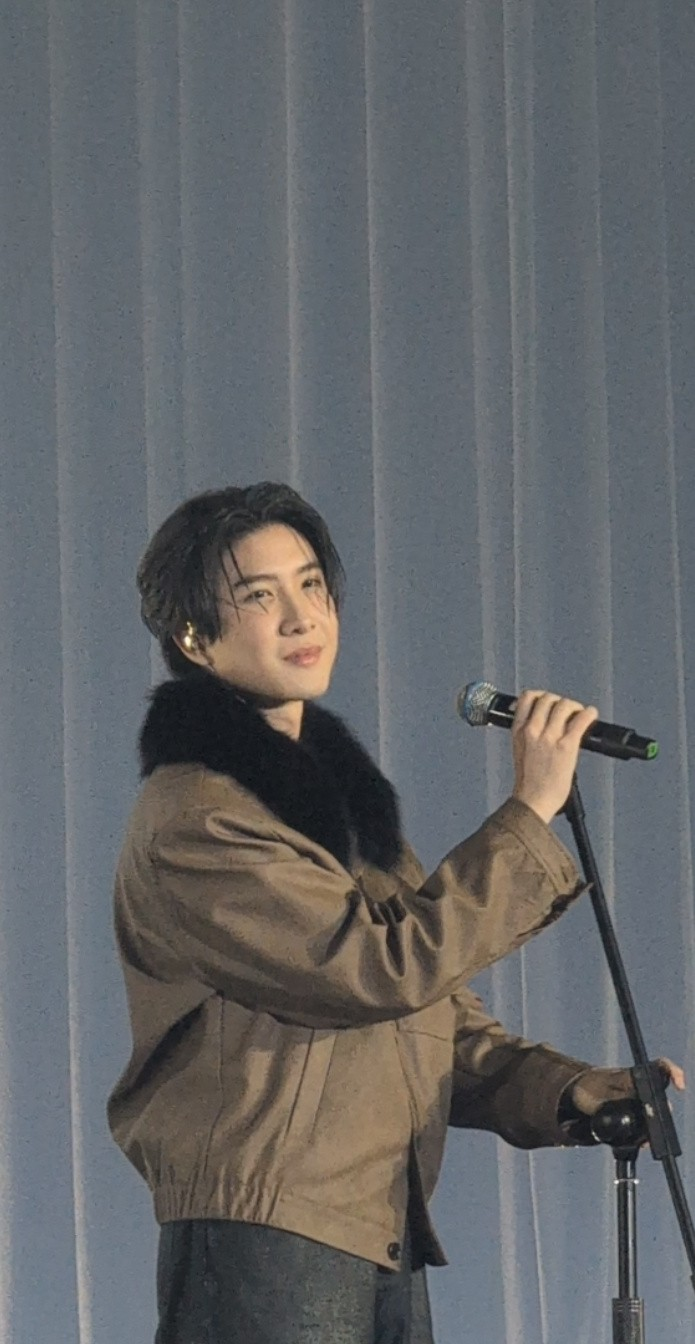
- Thanawat at The Heart Killers Fan Meeting in Manila in July 2025
- Born: October 13, 1998 (age 28); Lamphun Province, Thailand
- Other name: Khaotung
- Occupation: Actor
- Years active: 2018–present
- Agent: GMMTV
- Known for: Chonlatee/Chon in Tonhon Chonlatee; Songpol in 55:15 Never Too Late; Longtae in A Tale of Thousand Stars; Ayan in The Eclipse; Gaipa in Moonlight Chicken; Ray in Only Friends; Bison in The Heart Killers
- Height: 175 cm (5 ft 9 in)

Thanawat Ratanakitpaisan (Note: Also romanized Rattanakitpaisan) (Thai: ธนวัฒน์ รัตนกิจไพศาล; born 13 October 1998), nicknamed Khaotung (Thai: ข้าวตัง) is a Thai actor signed under GMMTV. He made his acting debut in 'Cause You're My Boy (2018) and is best known for his starring roles in the television series Tonhon Chonlatee (2020), 55:15 Never Too Late (2021), The Eclipse (2022), Only Friends (2023) and The Heart Killers (2024).

== Early life and education ==
Ratanakitpaisan was born and raised in Lamphun Province, Thailand. He has a younger sister. His father died when he was seven years old. He completed his secondary education at Monfort College. In 2017, he enrolled at Chiang Mai University under the Faculty of Medical Technology before transferring to Kasetsart University to study Environmental Engineering in 2018.

== Career ==
In 2018, at the age of 19, Ratanakitpaisan was signed as an artist under the production and talent agency GMMTV after a casting manager saw his photos on social media and asked him to audition for the company. Shortly after, he made his acting television debut as a supporting character in the series 'Cause You're My Boy. He followed this by supporting roles in The Charming Step Mom, Blacklist and 2gether.

In 2020, Ratanakitpaisan landed his first leading role as the titular character in the boys' love series Tonhon Chonlatee alongside Suphakorn Sriphothong.

In 2021, Ratanakitpaisan played Longtae, the village chief's son, in A Tale of Thousand Stars. Later in the year, he ventured into music, releasing his first single, "Never Too Late", which served as the opening theme song for the series 55:15 Never Too Late, in which he also starred in a main role as Paul, a closeted 55-year-old man who wakes up in the body of his 15-year-old self.

In 2022, Ratanakitpaisan starred as Ayan in the series The Eclipse alongside real-life best friend Kanaphan Puitrakul (First). The Eclipse won Best BL Series at the Thai Digital Awards 2022 and the Bronze Award for Best LGBTQ+ Programme Made in Asia at the Content Asia Awards 2023. He also earned an Asia Television Awards nomination for Best Theme Song for "Over the Moon (คลาด)" for which Ratanakitpaisan provided lead vocals. First Kanaphan and Ratanakitpaisan would later reprise their roles as Akk and Ayan in the 2023 anthology series Our Skyy 2.

In 2023, Ratanakitpaisan had a supporting role in the Moonlight Chicken. For his portrayal of Gaipa, he won the award for Best Supporting Actor at the Y Universe Awards, as well as a nomination for Best Actor in A Supporting Role at the Asia Television Awards. In August, Ratanakitpaisan played Ray, a wealthy university student suffering from alcohol addiction, in the ensemble cast series Only Friends. The role earned him a Best Actor in a Leading Role nomination at the Y Universe Awards.

In 2024, Ratanakitpaisan became one of the new hosts of the long-running variety show School Rangers. Later in the year, he worked again with Only Friends director Tichakorn Phukhaotong and on-screen partner Kanaphan Puitrakul (First), playing an assassin in The Heart Killers.

== Filmography ==
=== Television series ===
Key
†	Denotes television productions that have not yet been released

Year	Title	Role	Notes	Ref.
2018	'Cause You're My Boy	Au	Supporting role	
2018	Our Skyy	Au	Guest role	
2019	The Charming Step Mom	Kothom	Supporting role	
2019	Blacklist	Joe	Supporting role	
2020	2gether	Fong (Tine's friend)	Supporting role	
2020	Still 2gether	Fong (Tine's friend)	Supporting role	
2020	Tonhon Chonlatee	Chonlatee	Main role	
2021	A Tale of Thousand Stars	Longtae (Khama's son)	Supporting role	
2021	55:15 Never Too Late	Songpol / Paul	Main role	
2022	The Eclipse	Ayan	Main role	
2023	Moonlight Chicken	Gaipa	Supporting role	
2023	Our Skyy 2	Ayan	Main role	
2023	Home School	Zero	Guest role (Ep. 18)	
2023	Only Friends	"Ray" Pakon	Main role	
2024	The Heart Killers	"Bison" Aechitpol Phanlert	Main role	
2025	Ossan's Love Thailand	Kaitong (Alone's boyfriend)	Guest role (Ep. 2, 11)	
2025	Sweet Tooth, Good Dentist	Jeng	Guest role (Ep. 9–10)	
2026	Cat for Cash	Lynx	Main role	
2026	Only Friends: Dream On	"Ray" Pakon	Guest role (Ep. 1, 6, 12)	
TBA	The Invisible Dragon †	Khun	Main role	
TBA	High & Low: Born to Be High †	Zero	TBA	
TBA	A Season to Remember †	"Klao" Ketklao	Main role	

=== Television show ===
Year	Title	Role	Notes	Ref.
2021	Safe House	Cast member	Season winner	
2022	Safe House: Season 4	Cast member		
2024	School Rangers	Host		

=== Film ===
Year	Title	Role	Notes	Ref.
2021	2gether: The Movie	Fong	Supporting role	

== Discography ==
=== Collaborations ===
Year	Title	Label	Notes
2024	"You're My Treasure" (with Earth, Mix, Pond, Phuwin, First, Joong, Dunk, Gemini, Fourth, Perth, Chimon, Force, Book, Jimmy, Sea, Winny, Satang)	GMMTV Records	Love Out Loud Fan Fest 2024
2026	"Love Feels So Fast" (with Earth, Mix, Pond, Phuwin, First, Joong, Dunk, Gemini, Fourth, Perth, Santa, Force, Book, Jimmy, Sea, Boun, Prem, William, Est, Junior, Mark, Joss, Gawin)	GMMTV Records	Love Out Loud Fan Fest 2026

=== Soundtrack appearances ===
Year	Title	Album	Label	Ref.
2021	"Never Too Late"	55:15 Never Too Late OST	GMMTV Records	
2022	"คลาด (Over the Moon)"	The Eclipse OST	GMMTV Records	
2023	"The Moon Represents My Heart" (Cover) (with Earth, Mix, First, Gemini, Fourth)	Moonlight Chicken OST	GMMTV Records	
2023	"ฟังดีดี (Your World, My World)" (with First Kanaphan)	Our Skyy 2 OST	GMMTV Records	
2023	"เอาเลยมั้ย (Let's Try)"	Only Friends OST	GMMTV Records	
2024	"เขาจ้างให้ผมจีบนักฆ่า (Destroy Love)"	The Heart Killers OST	GMMTV Records	
2026	"บ้านของหัวใจ (Found My Home)" (with First Kanaphan)	Cat for Cash OST	GMMTV Records	
2026	"ใจโหด (Fearless)"	Lovers & Gangsters OST	GMMTV Records	

== Awards and nominations ==
Award nominations for Thanawat Ratanakitpaisan
Year	Award	Category	Nominee(s)	Result	Ref.
2023	Y Universe Awards	Best Supporting Actor	Moonlight Chicken	Won	
2023	Y Universe Awards	Best Actor in a Leading Role	Only Friends	Nominated	
2023	Y Universe Awards	Best Series OST	Only Friends	Nominated	
2024	28th Asian Television Awards	Best Actor in a Supporting Role	Moonlight Chicken	Nominated	
2024	28th Asian Television Awards	Best Theme Song	"The Moon Represents My Heart"	Nominated	
2024	28th Asian Television Awards	Best Theme Song	"คลาด (Over the Moon)"	Nominated	
2024	29th Asian Television Awards	Best Actor in a Leading Role	Only Friends	Nominated	
2024	29th Asian Television Awards	Best Theme Song	"เอาเลยมั้ย (Let’s Try)"	Nominated	
