= Melody of Secrets =

2025–26 Thai television series

- Official series poster
- Thai: ความลับในบทเพลงที่บรรเลงไม่รู้จบ
- Genre: Romance; Drama; Mystery
- Created by: Bangpahn Homjan
- Screenplay by: Kusolin Mekviphat; Phoutida Nosavan
- Directed by: Tawan Charuchinda; Arisa Wawwanjit
- Starring: Jiratchapong Srisang; Kasidet Plookphol
- Opening theme: "โลกสีเทา (Dark and Light)" by Book Kasidet
- Ending theme: "ความรักในบทเพลงที่บรรเลงไม่รู้จบ (Endless Love Song)" by Force Jiratchapong
- Country of origin: Thailand
- Original language: Thai
- No. of episodes: 10

Production
- Executive producers: Sataporn Panichraksapong; Darapa Choeysanguan
- Producers: Noppharnach Chaiyahwimhon; Rabob Pokanngaen
- Cinematography: Ratthakit Kittiratthanaphokin
- Running time: 45–50 minutes
- Production companies: GMMTV; Snap25

Original release
- Network: One 31; Viu
- Release: 5 December 2025 – 13 February 2026

Melody of Secrets (Thai: ความลับในบทเพลงที่บรรเลงไม่รู้จบ; RTGS: Khwam Lap Nai Botphleng Thi Banleng Mai Ru Jop, lit. 'Secret in the Song Lyrics that Play Endlessly') is a Thai boys' love television series starring Jiratchapong Srisang (Force) and Kasidet Plookphol (Book). Directed by Tawan Charuchinda alongside Arisa Wawwanjit and produced by GMMTV and Snap25, it was announced at the GMMTV Riding the Wave event on 26 November 2024.

The series aired on One 31 on 5 December 2025, airing every Friday at 20:30 ICT, and was made available for streaming on Viu at 22:30 ICT.

== Synopsis ==
Botphleng (Kasidet Plookphol), a young man who lost his memory from an accident, receives a mysterious diary that said he used to have a lover from the past: Tankhun (Jiratchapong Srisang). But when they meet, Botphleng immediately knows that this man is not his Tankhun despite the gaps in his memories. Botphleng therefore uses the murder that occurred on the day he met Tankhun to investigate who this mysterious yet charming man really is. However, Botphleng soon realises he has more questions about himself than he ever could about Tankhun.

== Cast and characters ==
=== Main ===
- Jiratchapong Srisang (Force) as Tankhun Rongsompong (Tan)
- Kasidet Plookphol (Book) as Botphleng Thayadol

=== Supporting ===
- Ployshompoo Supasap (Jan) as Darakorn Decha-anek (Dao)
- Noppanut Guntachai (Boun) as Muenmile
- Patchatorn Thanawat (Ployphach) as Jennari Rongsompong (Jen)
- Thiyada Phanbua (Kate) as Khitakan Thayadol
- Piyamas Monayakol (Pu) as Kessara Thayadol
- Tawan Charuchinda (Tle) as Tanu Thiwfon
- Juthapich Indrajundra (Jamie) as Nim

=== Guest ===
- Panachai Sriariyarungruang (Junior) as Thunphob Rongsomphong
- Jiruntanin Trairattanayon (Mark) as Phleng

== Original soundtrack ==
The official soundtrack for Melody of Secrets features:

Song	Artist(s)	Label	Ref.
"โลกสีเทา (Dark and Light)"	Book Kasidet	GMMTV Records	
"ความรักในบทเพลงที่บรรเลงไม่รู้จบ (Endless Love Song)"	Force Jiratchapong	GMMTV Records	

== Fan meetings ==
Year	Title	Date	Venue	Ref.
2025	Melody of Secrets: The 3rd Tune	19 December 2025	Siam Pavalai Paragon Cineplex	
2026	Melody of Secrets: Final EP. Fan Meeting	13 February 2026	Siam Pavalai Paragon Cineplex	

== Awards and nominations ==
Award nominations for Melody of Secrets
Year	Award	Category	Nominee(s)	Result	Ref.
2026	ContentAsia Awards 2026	Best LGBTQ+ Programme Made in Asia	Melody of Secrets	Bronze	
