= Jiratchapong Srisang =

Thai actor (born 1997)

- จิรัชพงศ์ ศรีแสง
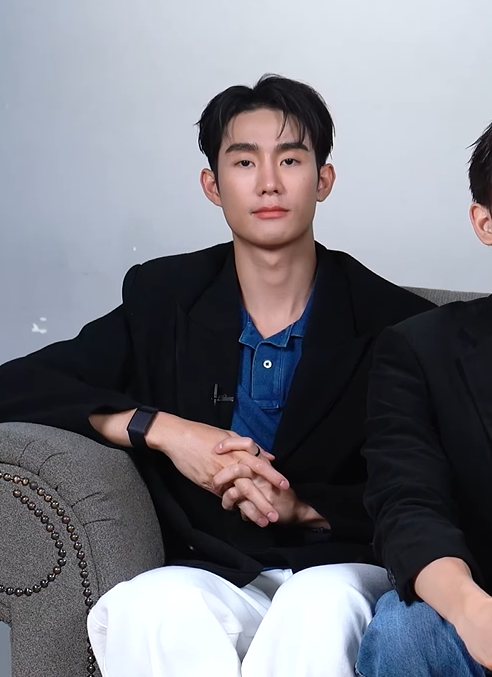
- Jiratchapong in April 2025
- Born: 9 March 1997 (age 29); Thailand
- Other name: Force (ฟอส)
- Education: Rangsit University
- Occupation: Actor
- Years active: 2022–present
- Agent: GMMTV
- Known for: Akk in Enchanté; Top in Only Friends; Arc in Perfect 10 Liners; Tan in Melody of Secrets; Sen in Lovers & Gangsters
- Height: 185 cm (6 ft 1 in)

Signature
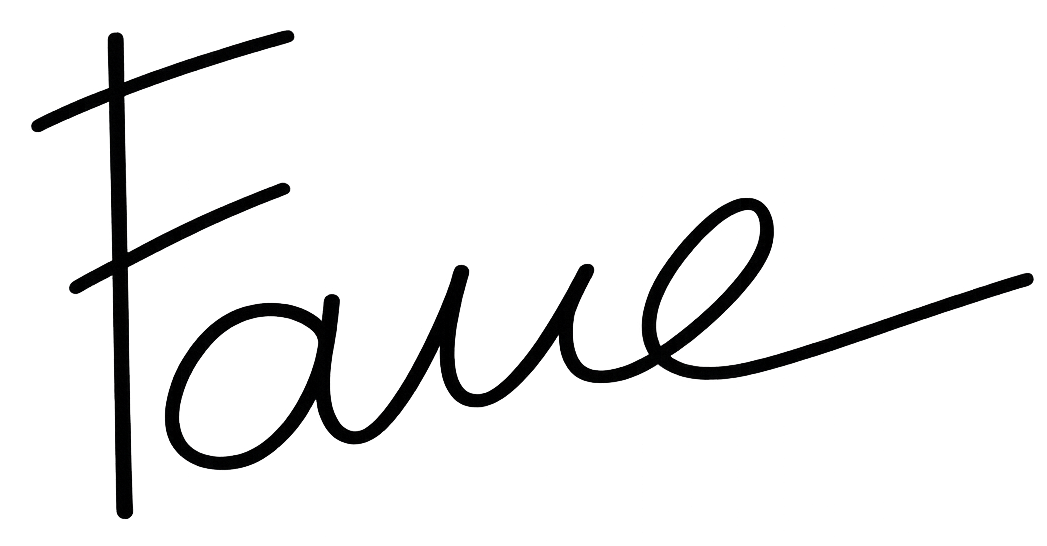

Jiratchapong Srisang (Thai: จิรัชพงศ์ ศรีแสง; born 1997), nicknamed Force (Thai: ฟอส), is a Thai actor known his roles in Only Friends (2023), Perfect 10 Liners (2024), Melody of Secrets (2025) and Lovers & Gangsters (2026).

== Early life and education ==
Jiratchapong was born on 9 March 1997 in Thailand. He studied at Rangsit University College of Communication Arts with a bachelor's degree in digital marketing.

== Career ==
In 2020, Jiratchapong began as a trainee under MBO, a Thai record label and management agency and a subsidiary of GMM Grammy, before the label went defunct in 2021. Afterwards, he signed with GMMTV He was further introduced to the audience of the entertainment industry through the GMMTV variety show Safe House Season 2: Winter Camp in 2021.

In 2022, he landed his first main role as Akk in the series Enchanté alongside Kasidet Plookphol (Book). Both of them gained recognition as ForceBook, leading to more numerous joint projects. Before their partnership on the screen, they are already close friends who attended the same school from kindergarten to high school.

In 2023, Jiratchapong starred in A Boss and a Babe as Gun, the boss of a failing game company who discovers his new eternally optimistic intern Cher (Kasidet Plookphol) is secretly his favourite e-sports streamer. In the same year, both of them reprised their roles in Our Skyy 2 and starred in Only Friends. In 2024, Jiratchapong continued his acting works by appearing as lead role in Perfect 10 Liners (2024) together with Kasidet Plookphol.

Outside his acting works, he also has been involved in various brands partnerships. In January 2024, he attended the Dolce&Gabbana Party during Milan Menswear Fall/Winter 2024–2025 in Milan, Italy, together with Kasidet Plookphol. In 2025, Jiratchapong founded and owns the Rowie's Coffee brand, operating in several locations throughout Bangkok's shopping malls.

== Filmography ==
=== Television series ===
Key
†	Denotes television productions that have not yet been released

Year	Title	Role	Notes	Network	Ref.
2017	Noir	"Mark" Thatadon Tangphatthanasakulchai	Main role	YouTube	
2020	Voice in the Rain	—N/a	Guest role		
2022	Enchanté	"Akk" Itsara	Main role	GMM 25	
2022	Vice Versa	"Akk" Itsara	Guest role	GMM 25	
2023	A Boss and a Babe	"Gun" Gungawin	Main role	GMM 25	
2023	Our Skyy 2: GunCher	"Gun" Gungawin	Main role	GMM 25	
2023	Only Friends	"Top" Tanin	Main role	GMM 25	
2024	Only Boo!	—N/a	Guest role	GMM 25	
2024	Peaceful Property	Phoom (young)	Guest role	GMM 25	
2024	Perfect 10 Liners	"Arc" Anol Paraminphisan	Main role	GMM 25	
2025	Break Up Service	First	Guest role	GMM 25	
2025	Melody of Secrets	"Tan" Tankhun Rongsompong	Main role	One 31	
2026	Only Friends: Dream On	"Top" Tanin	Guest role	One 31	
2026	Peach and Me	Himself	Guest role	GMM 25	
2026	Lovers & Gangsters	"Sen" Hongsen Gaoyod	Main role	One 31	
2026	Scarlet Heart Ullavee	Prince Pha Wiang of Meng Mang / Bew	Main role	One 31	
TBA	Boys 4 Moms †	Porsche	Main role	TBA	

=== Television show ===
Year	Title	Network	Notes
2021	Jen Jud God Jig Up Level Special	GMMTV	Ep. 3
2021	Safe House Season 2: Winter Camp	GMMTV	Regular member
2021	Arm Share	GMMTV	Ep. 83
2022	OffGun Mommy Taste Special	GMMTV	Ep. 5
2022	Arm Share	GMMTV	Ep. 87
2022	School Rangers	GMM 25	Ep. 208
2022	Krahai Lao	GMMTV	Ep. 20
2022	School Rangers	GMM 25	Ep. 209
2022	Talk with Toey	GMM 25	Ep. 49
2022	Arm Share	GMM 25	Ep. 113
2022	Arm Share	GMM 25	Ep. 123
2023	Project Alpha	GMM 25	Ep. 9
2023	Project Alpha	GMM 25	Ep. 12
2023	Talk with Toey	GMM 25	Ep. 104
2023	School Rangers	GMM 25	Ep. 262–263
2023	Sound Check 2023		Ep. 53
2023	School Rangers	GMM 25	Ep. 284–285
2024	School Rangers	GMM 25	Main host
2024	The Story 2024	One 31	Ep. 6
2024	Arm Share	GMMTV	Ep. 152
2024	Grow Up To Be		Ep. 15
2024	Fully Booked		Regular member
2024	High Season: Fun Summer Camp		Ep. 3–7
2024	Arm Share	GMMTV	Ep. 167
2025	TayNew Meal Date Special	GMM 25	Ep. 20
2025	Bestie Tasty Season 2	GMM 25	Ep. 1
2025	Arm Share	GMMTV	Ep. 179
2026	Trend to Golden Figure		Ep. 2
2026	TayNew Meal Date Special	GMM 25	Ep. 23
2026	Stay Awake	GMMTV	Main host

=== Music video appearances ===
Year	Title	Artist	Label	Notes	Ref.
2022	"ยินดีที่รู้ใจ (Enchanté)"	Tay Tawan	GMMTV Records	Enchanté OST	
2022	"รู้แค่ผมรักคุณก็พอ (Je t’aime à la folie)"	Gawin Caskey	GMMTV Records	Enchanté OST	
2023	"มีเธอนี่แหละดี (My Luck)"	Book Kasidet	GMMTV Records	A Boss and a Babe OST	
2023	"แค่คนตัวเล็กๆ (Selfless)"	Louis Thanawin	GMMTV Records	A Boss and a Babe OST	
2023	"เอาเลยมั้ย (Let’s Try)"	Khaotung Thanawat	GMMTV Records	Only Friends OST	
2023	"รัก…แล้วได้อะไร (So What?)"	Ford Allan	GMMTV Records	Only Friends OST	
2025	"โลกสีเทา (Dark and Light)"	Book Kasidet	GMMTV Records	Melody of Secrets OST	

== Discography ==
=== Singles ===
==== Collaborations ====
Year	Title	Label	Notes	Ref.
2024	"You're My Treasure" with Book, Earth, Mix, Pond, Phuwin, Joong, Dunk, Jimmy, Sea, First, Khaotung, Gemini, Fourth, Winny, Satang, Perth, Chimon	GMMTV Records	Love Out Loud Fan Fest 2024	
2025	"เติมใจ (Heart Full)" with Book Kasidet	GMMTV Records	—N/a	
2026	"Love Feels So Fast" with Book, Earth, Mix, Boun, Prem, Pond, Phuwin, Joong, Dunk, Jimmy, Sea, First, Khaotung, Gemini, Fourth, Perth, Santa, William, Est, Junior, Mark, Joss, Gawin	GMMTV Records	Love Out Loud Fan Fest 2026	

==== Soundtrack appearances ====
Year	Title	Album	Label	Ref.
2023	"เปลี่ยนใจแล้ว (Second Thoughts)" with Book Kasidet	Our Skyy 2 OST	GMMTV Records	
2024	"วันนี้ (Perfect)" with Book Kasidet, Perth Tanapon, Santa Pongsapak and Junior Panachai and Mark Jiruntanin	Perfect 10 Liners OST	GMMTV Records	
2024	"ผู้ร้ายปากแข็ง (Love Suspect)" with Book Kasidet	Perfect 10 Liners OST	GMMTV Records	
2025	"ความรักในบทเพลงที่บรรเลงไม่รู้จบ (Endless Love Song)"	Melody of Secrets OST	GMMTV Records	

== Fan meetings ==
Title	Date	Venue	Notes	Ref.
A Boss and a Babe: Final Ep. Fan Meeting	May 19, 2023	Siam Pavalai Theatre, Paragon Cineplex	With A Boss and a Babe Cast	
ForceBook Fan Meeting in Japan	July 16, 2023	Shintoshi Hall, Yokohama	With Book	
GMMTV Fan Day 6 in Seoul	August 20, 2023	Naksan Hall, Hansung University	With Book	
GMMTV Fan Day in Bangkok	September 23, 2023	Union Hall, Union Mall	With Book	
ForceBook Fan Meeting in Manila	October 1, 2023	SM North EDSA Skydome	With Book	
ForceBook FanMeeting in Taipei	October 15, 2023	Legacy Taipei	With Book	
Only Friends: Final Ep. Fan Meeting	October 28, 2023	Siam Pavalai Theatre, Paragon Cineplex	With Only Friends Cast	
ForceBook Fan Meeting in Hong Kong	November 3, 2023	KITEC	With Book	
ForceBook Fan Meeting in Italy	December 2, 2023	Hilton Rome Airport Hotel	With Book	
Only Friends Fan Meeting in Japan	December 9, 2023	Saitama Hall	With Only Friends Cast	
ForceBook Fan Meeting in Macau	December 16, 2023	H853 Entertainment Place, Lisboeta Macau	With Book	
Only Friends Fan Meeting in Taipei	April 7, 2024	NTU Sports Center	With Only Friends Cast	
GMMTV Fan Day 10 in Cambodia	June 2, 2024	Naga World-Phnom Penh	With Book	
Only Friends Fan Meeting in Hong Kong	June 15, 2024	AXA Dreamland	With Only Friends Cast	
GMMTV Fan Day 12 in Japan	June 23, 2024	Winc Aichi, Nagoya	With Book	
Only Friends Fan Meeting in Vietnam	July 6, 2024	Hoa Binh Theater	With Only Friends Cast	
Only Friends Fan Meeting in Manila	August 24, 2024	New Frontier Theater	With Only Friends Cast	
Perfect 10 Liners: First Date	October 27, 2024	Siam Pavalai Theatre, Paragon Cineplex	With Perfect 10 Liners Cast	
ForceBook 2nd Fan Meeting in Hong Kong	November 17, 2024	Gordon Wu Hall	With Book	
ForceBook 2nd Fan Meeting in Italy	January 12, 2025	Hilton Rome Airport Hotel	With Book	
Perfect 10 Liners: Bye Nior Fan Party	April 6, 2025	MCC Hall 4th Fl. The Mall Lifestore Ngamwongwan	With Perfect 10 Liners Cast	
Perfect 10 Liners: Bye Nior After Party	April 7, 2025	MCC Hall 4th Fl. The Mall Lifestore Ngamwongwan	With Perfect 10 Liners Cast	
Perfect 10 Liners Fan Meeting in Japan	May 24, 2025	Ebisu The Garden Hall	With Perfect 10 Liners Cast	
Perfect 10 Liners Fan Meeting in Manila	August 23, 2025	Samsung Hall, SM Aura Premier	With Perfect 10 Liners Cast	
Perfect 10 Liners Fan Meeting in Vietnam	October 11, 2025	District 10 Cultural Center	With Perfect 10 Liners Cast	
Melody of Secrets: The 3rd Tune	December 19th, 2025	Siam Pavalai Theatre, Paragon Cineplex	With Melody of Secrets Cast	
Melody of Secrets: Final Ep. Fan Meeting	February 13, 2026	Siam Pavalai Theatre, Paragon Cineplex	With Melody of Secrets Cast	
ForceBook Fan Meeting in Ho Chi Minh City	July 26, 2026	C30 Stage	With Book	
GMMTV Fan Day 31 in Taipei	June 13, 2026	Zepp New Taipei	With Book	
GMMTV Fan Day 32 in Singapore	September 5, 2026	The Theatre at Mediacorp	With Book	
GMMTV Fanival: Happy Family	October 10, 2026	Union Hall, Union Mall	With Book	
GMMTV Fan Day 38 in USA	October 21, 2026	Harris Theatre	With Book	
GMMTV Fan Day 38 in USA	October 25, 2026	Woodlawn Theatre	With Book	
Lovers & Gangsters: The Legend Begins	October 30, 2026	Union Hall, Union Mall	With Lovers & Gangsters cast	
Scarlet Heart Ullavee: The Grand Premiere	November 4, 2026	Union Hall, Union Mall	With Scarlet Heart Ullavee cast	
ForceBook Fan Meeting in Berlin	December 5, 2026	Estrel Berlin	With Book	
ForceBook Fan Meeting in Manila	December 12, 2026	Solaire North Ballroom	With Book	
GMMTV Fan Day 2027: Tokyo	February 13–14, 2027	New Pier Hall, Tokyo	With Book	
GMMTV Fan Day 2027: Taipei	April 17–18, 2027	Zepp New Taipei, Honhui Plaza	With Book	

== Concerts ==
Title	Date(s)	Venue	Artist(s)	Ref.
Love Out Loud Fan Fest 2023: Lovolution	May 24–25, 2023	Royal Paragon Hall	With Book, Earth, Mix, Pond, Phuwin, Ohm, Nanon, Joong, Dunk, Jimmy, Sea, First, Khaotung, Gemini, Fourth	
GMMTV Fan Fest 2023	October 9, 2023	Pia Arena MN	With Book, Earth, Mix, Pond, Phuwin, Joong, Dunk, Jimmy, Sea, First, Khaotung, Gemini, Fourth, Perth, Chimon, Gawin, Krist	
GMMTV Happy Weekend in Japan	February 24, 2024	Tachikawa Stage Garden	With Book, Off, Gun, Tay, New, Pond, Phuwin, Joong, Dunk, Jimmy, Sea, First, Khaotung, Gemini, Fourth, Perth, Chimon	
Love Out Loud Fan Fest 2024: The Love Pirates	May 18–19, 2024	Impact Arena, Muang Thong Thani	With Book, Earth, Mix, Pond, Phuwin, Joong, Dunk, Jimmy, Sea, First, Khaotung, Gemini, Fourth, Winny, Satang, Perth, Chimon	
GMMTV Fan Fest 2024	December 8, 2024	Galaxy Arena, Macau	With Book, Off, Gun, Tay, New, Earth, Mix, Boun, Prem, Pond, Phuwin, Joong, Dunk, Jimmy, Sea, First, Khaotung, Milk, Love	
Love Out Loud Fan Fest 2025: Lovemosphere	May 17–18, 2025	Impact Arena, Muang Thong Thani	With Book, Earth, Mix, Boun, Prem, Pond, Phuwin, Joong, Dunk, Jimmy, Sea, First, Khaotung, Gemini, Fourth, Winny, Satang, Perth, Santa, William, Est	
JuniorMark Shine Rise Fancon	August 12, 2025	Union Hall, Union Mall	With Junior, Mark, Book, Sing, Jan	
ForceBook Funtopia Fancon	April 3–4, 2026	Union Hall, Union Mall	With Book, Jung, First, Khaotung, Jimmy, Junior, Joss, Gawin	
Love Out Loud Fan Fest 2026: Heart Race	May 22–24, 2026	Impact Arena, Muang Thong Thani	With Book, Earth, Mix, Boun, Prem, Pond, Phuwin, Joong, Dunk, Jimmy, Sea, First, Khaotung, Gemini, Fourth, Perth, Santa, William, Est, Junior, Mark, Joss, Gawin	
PerthSanta Devil's Kiss Concert	July 19, 2026	Paragon Hall	With Perth, Santa, Off, Junior	

== Awards and nominations ==
Award nominations for Jiratchapong Srisang
Year	Award	Category	Nominee(s)	Result	Ref.
2022	CBLO Awards	Rising BL Actor of the Year	—N/a	Won	
2022	CBLO Awards	Most Supportive BL Fandom	with Kasidet Plookphol	Won	
2024	HiBL! Awards	Best Series	Only Friends	Won	
2024	Kazz Awards	Couple of the Year	with Kasidet Plookphol	Won	
2024	Thailand Y Content Awards	Best Series	Perfect 10 Liners	Won	
2025	Mint Awards 2025	Entertainment Program of the Year	Perfect 10 Liners	Won	
