= Our Skyy =

2018 Thai television series

- Official series poster for season 1
- Thai: Our Skyy – อยากเห็นท้องฟ้าเป็นอย่างวันนั้น
- Genre: Boys' love; Romantic comedy; Drama; Anthology
- Starring: Jumpol Adulkittiporn; Atthaphan Phunsawat; Purim Rattanaruangwattana; Wachirawit Ruangwiwat; Thanatsaran Samthonglai; Sattabut Laedeke; Tawan Vihokratana; Thitipoom Techaapaikhun; Perawat Sangpotirat; Prachaya Ruangroj; Naravit Lertratkosum; Phuwin Tangsakyuen; Archen Aydin; Natachai Boonprasert; Kanaphan Puitrakul; Thanawat Rattanakitpaisan; Jitaraphol Potiwihok; Tawinan Anukoolprasert; Norawit Titicharoenrak; Nattawat Jirochtikul; Jiratchapong Srisang; Kasidet Plookphol; Pawat Chittsawangdee; Korapat Kirdpan; Pirapat Watthanasetsiri; Sahaphap Wongratch
- Opening theme: เสียดาย (Sia Dai) (lit. Pity) by 5U
- Country of origin: Thailand
- Original language: Thai
- No. of seasons: 2
- No. of episodes: 21

Production
- Running time: 45-50 minutes
- Production company: GMMTV

Original release
- Network: LINE TV; GMM25
- Release: November 23, 2018 – June 8, 2023

Our Skyy (Thai: Our Skyy – อยากเห็นท้องฟ้าเป็นอย่างวันนั้น; Our Skyy – Yak Hen Thong Fa Pen Yang Wan Nan) (translated as Our Skyy - I Want To See The Sky Like That Day) is a Thai anthology BL television series that expands on different concluded BL series.

== Synopsis ==
Each episode of Our Skyy intends to further explore and give closure to a different relationship featured in a previous show.

== Season 1 (2018) ==
=== PickRome ===
==== Cast and characters ====
===== Main =====
- Jumpol Adulkittiporn (Off) as Pakorn Sirinachot (Pick)
- Atthaphan Phunsawat (Gun) as Thanapat Pornprom (Rome)

==== Supporting ====
- Weerayut Chansook (Arm) as Good
- Phongsathorn Padungktiwong (Green) as Pao
- Petchbuntoon Pongphan (Louis) as Nueng
- Sarocha Burintr (Gigie) as Jay

=== InSun ===
==== Cast and characters ====
===== Main =====
- Purim Rattanaruangwattana (Pluem) as In
- Wachirawit Ruangwiwat (Chimon) as Sun

==== Supporting ====
- Chinnarat Siripongchawalit (Mike) as Toey

=== TeeMork ===
==== Cast and characters ====
===== Main =====
- Thanatsaran Samthonglai (Frank) as Mungkorn Jiaranontanan (Tee)
- Sattabut Laedeke (Drake) as Nueamork Jirapakpinit (Mork)

==== Supporting ====
- Phuwin Tangsakyuen as Morn
- Trai Nimtawat (Neo) as Gord
- Ploynira Hiruntaveesin (Kapook) as Nae

==== Guest ====
- Chayapol Jutamas (AJ) as Ton
- Thanawat Rattanakitpaisan (Khaotung) as Au

=== PeteKao ===
==== Cast and characters ====
===== Main =====
- Tawan Vihokratana (Tay) as Phubodin Rachatraku (Pete)
- Thitipoom Techaapaikhun (New) as Phanuwat Chotiwat (Kao)

==== Guest ====
- Tachakorn Boonlupyanun (Godji)

=== KongphobArthit ===
==== Cast and characters ====
===== Main =====
- Perawat Sangpotirat (Krist) as Arthit Rojnapat (Oon)
- Prachaya Ruangroj (Singto) as Kongphop Suttilak (Kong)

==== Supporting ====
- Korn Khunatipapisiri (Oaujun) as Tew
- Ployshompoo Supasap (Jan) as Praepailin
- Neen Suwanamas as May
- Naradon Namboonjit (Prince) as Oak
- Chanagun Arpornsutinan (Gunsmile) as Prem
- Natthawaranthorn Khamchoo as Tutah

==== Guest ====
- Sivakorn Lertchuchot (Guy) as Yong

== Season 2 (2023) ==
=== PalmDiao ===
==== Main ====
- Naravit Lertratkosum (Pond) as Pannakorn Jannaloy (Palm)
- Phuwin Tangsakyuen as Nuengdiao Kiattrakulmethee

==== Supporting ====
- Natarit Worakornlertsith (Marc) as Kan
- Thanik Kamontharanon (Pawin) as Phum

==== Guest ====
- Pitayut Orsuwan (Nice) as Attacker

=== KluenDao ===
==== Main ====
- Archen Aydin (Joong) as Kanaruj Wongthampanich (Khabkluen)
- Natachai Boonprasert (Dunk) as Daonuea (Dao)

==== Supporting ====
- Phanuroj Chalermkijporntavee (Pepper) as Typhoon
- Thanawin Pholcharoenrat (Winny) as Nay
- Thanik Kamontharanon (Pawin) as Maitee
- Kittiphop Sereevichayasawat (Satang) as Sean

==== Guest ====
- Praekwan Phongskul (Bimbeam) as Min

=== AkkAyan ===
==== Main ====
- Kanaphan Puitrakul (First) as Akk Pipitphattana
- Thanawat Ratanakitpaisan (Khaotung) as Ayan Sukkhaphisit

==== Supporting ====
- Trai Nimtawat (Neo) as Khanlong
- Thanawin Teeraphosukarn (Louis) as Thuaphu
- Chayapol Jutamas (AJ) as Wasuwat
- Thanik Kamontharanon (Pawin) as Namo
- Phatchatorn Thanawat (Ploypach) as Sani

==== Guest ====
- Wasin Panunaporn (Kenji) as Mok (Ep. 1)
- Tanwarin Sukkhapisit (Golf) (Ep. 2)
- Theepisit Mahaneeranon (Frame) (Ep. 2)

=== PuenTalay ===
==== Main ====
- Jitaraphol Potiwihok (Jimmy) as Puen
- Tawinan Anukoolprasert (Sea) as Rawi Lertpanya (Talay)

==== Supporting ====
- Trai Nimtawat (Neo) as Up
- Thanaboon Kiatniran (Aou) as Tou
- Pachchun Hiranprateep (Chun) as Jigsaw

=== TinnGun ===
==== Main ====
- Norawit Titicharoenrak (Gemini) as Tinnaphob Jirawatthanakul (Tinn)
- Nattawat Jirochtikul (Fourth) as Guntaphon Wongwitthaya (Gun)

==== Supporting ====
- Thanawin Pholcharoenrat (Winny) as Win
- Kittiphop Sereevichayasawat (Satang) as Sound
- Allan Asawasuebsakul (Ford) as Por
- Teepakron Kwanboon (Prom) as Patchara (Pat)
- Pheerawit Koolkang (Captain) as Yo
- Pakin Kunaanuwit (Mark) as Tiwson
- Napat Patcharachavalit (Aun) as Kajorn (Jorn)

==== Guest ====
- Sarocha Watittapan (Tao) as Potjanee (Tinn's mother)
- Pijika Jittaputta (Lookwa) as Ratchanee (Gun's mother)

=== GunCher ===
==== Main ====
- Jiratchapong Srisang (Force) as Gun
- Kasidet Plookphol (Book) as Cher

==== Supporting ====
- Chinnarat Siriphongchawalit (Mike) as Jack
- Pusit Dittapisit (Fluke) as Thi
- Thipakorn Thitathan (Ohm) as Zo
- Leo Saussay as Tubtab
- Yardpirun Poolun (Namyard) as Oi

=== PatPran ===
==== Main ====
- Pawat Chittsawangdee (Ohm) as Napat Jindapat (Pat)
- Korapat Kirdpan (Nanon) as Parakul Siridechawat (Pran)

==== Supporting ====
- Pansa Vosbein (Milk) as Ink
- Pattranite Limpatiyakorn (Love) as Pa
- Jitaraphol Potiwihok (Jimmy) as Wai
- Pakin Kunaanuwit (Mark) as Chang
- Sattabut Laedeke (Drake) as Korn
- Natarit Worakornlertsith (Marc) as Louis
- Teepakron Kwanboon (Prom) as Mo
- Lotte Thakorn Promsatitkul (Lotte) as Safe

==== Guest ====
- Chertsak Pratumsrisakhon as Pichai
- Nattharat Kornkaew (Champ) as Yod
- Pirapat Watthanasetsiri (Earth) as Phupha Viriyanon
- Sahaphap Wongratch (Mix) as Tian Sopasitsakun

=== PatPran & PhuphaTian ===
==== Main ====
- Pawat Chittsawangdee (Ohm) as Napat Jindapat (Pat)
- Korapat Kirdpan (Nanon) as Parakul Siridechawat (Pran)
- Pirapat Watthanasetsiri (Earth) as Phupha Viriyanon
- Sahaphap Wongratch (Mix) as Tian Sopasitsakun

==== Supporting ====
- Nattharat Kornkaew (Champ) as Yod

==== Guest ====
- Kornprom Niyomsil (Au) as Villager

=== PhuphaTian ===
==== Main ====
- Pirapat Watthanasetsiri (Earth) as Phupha Viriyanon
- Sahaphap Wongratch (Mix) as Tian Sopasitsakun

==== Supporting ====
- Nattharat Kornkaew (Champ) as Yod
- Pawat Chittsawangdee (Ohm) as Napat Jindapat (Pat)
- Korapat Kirdpan (Nanon) as Parakul Siridechawat (Pran)

==== Guest ====
- Pansa Vosbein (Milk) as Ink
- Pattranite Limpatiyakorn (Love) as Pa
- Nawat Phumphotingam (White) as Tui
- Jitaraphol Potiwihok (Jimmy) as Wai
- Sattabut Laedeke (Drake) as Korn
- Paweena Charivsakul (Jeab) as Lalita
- Jakkrit Ammarat (Ton) as Teerayut

== Series overview ==
Season	Episodes		Originally released	
Season	Episodes		First released	Last released
1	5	PickRome	November 23, 2018	
1	5	InSun	November 30, 2018	
1	5	TeeMork	December 7, 2018	
1	5	PeteKao	December 14, 2018	
1	5	KongphobArthit	December 21, 2018	
2	16	PalmDiao	April 19, 2023	April 20, 2023
2	16	KluenDao	April 26, 2023	April 27, 2023
2	16	AkkAyan	May 3, 2023	May 4, 2023
2	16	PuenTalay	May 10, 2023	May 11, 2023
2	16	TinnGun	May 17, 2023	May 18, 2023
2	16	GunCher	May 24, 2023	May 25, 2023
2	16	PatPran	May 31, 2023	
2	16	PatPran & PhupaTian	June 1, 2023	June 7, 2023
2	16	PhupaTian	June 8, 2023	

== Production ==
=== Casting ===
In first season which aired in 2018. It was composed of 5 episodes. It starred Jumpol Adulkittiporn (Off) and Atthaphan Phunsawat (Gun) from Senior Secret Love: Puppy Honey and Senior Secret Love: Puppy Honey 2, Purim Rattanaruangwattana (Pluem) and Wachirawit Ruangwiwat (Chimon) from My Dear Loser: Edge of 17, Thanatsaran Samthonglai (Frank) and Sattabut Laedeke (Drake) from 'Cause You're My Boy, Tawan Vihokratana (Tay) and Thitipoom Techaapaikhun (New) from Kiss: The Series and Kiss Me Again, and Perawat Sangpotirat (Krist) and Prachaya Ruangroj (Singto) from SOTUS and SOTUS S.

The second season aired in 2023. It was composed of 8 different stories with 2 episodes per couple. It starred Naravit Lertratkosum (Pond) and Phuwin Tangsakyuen from Never Let Me Go, Archen Aydin (Joong) and Natachai Boonprasert (Dunk) from Star in My Mind and Sky in Your Heart, Kanaphan Puitrakul (First) and Thanawat Rattanakitpaisan (Khaotung) from The Eclipse, Jitaraphol Potiwihok (Jimmy) and Tawinan Anukoolprasert (Sea) from Vice Versa, Norawit Titicharoenrak (Gemini) and Nattawat Jirochtikul (Fourth) from My School President, Jiratchapong Srisang (Force) and Kasidet Plookphol (Book) from A Boss and a Babe, Pawat Chittsawangdee (Ohm) and Korapat Kirdpan (Nanon) from Bad Buddy, and Pirapat Watthanasetsiri (Earth) and Sahaphap Wongratch (Mix) from A Tale of Thousand Stars.

== Release ==
The show was produced by GMMTV. The first season premiered on LINE TV on 23 November 2018, airing on Fridays at 20:00 ICT. The series concluded on 21 December 2018. While the second season premiered on 19 April 2023 on Channel GMM25 and GMMTV's YouTube Channel, airing on Wednesdays and Thursday at 20:30 ICT.

== Original soundtrack ==
The official soundtrack for Our Skyy and Our Skyy 2 features:

Season	Song	Artist(s)	Label	Ref.
1	"เสียดาย (Sia Dai)"	5U	GMMTV Records	
1	"เข้าใจใช่ไหม"	Fiat Pattadon	GMMTV Records	
2	"ท้องฟ้ากับแสงดาวและสองเรา"	Joong Archen and Dunk Natachai	GMMTV Records	
2	"ฟังดีดี (Your World, My World)"	First Kanaphan and Khaotung Thanawat	GMMTV Records	
2	"ใครคลั่งรักกว่ากัน (Madly in Love)"	Jimmy Jitaraphol and Sea Tawinan	GMMTV Records	
2	"รักหน้าตาเหมือนเธอไหม (Love Love Love)"	Gemini Norawit	GMMTV Records	
2	"รักคู่ขนาน (Multi-Love)"	Gemini Norawit, Fourth Nattawat, Winny Thanawin, Satang Kittiphop, Mark Pakin and Ford Allan	GMMTV Records	
2	"เปลี่ยนใจแล้ว (Second Thoughts)"	Force Jiratchapong and Book Kasidet	GMMTV Records	
2	"คำเดียว (My Word)"	Ohm Pawat	GMMTV Records	
2	"ผาเคียงดาว (No Matter What)"	Earth Pirapat and Mix Sahaphap	GMMTV Records	

== Awards and nominations ==
Year	Award	Category	Recipient	Result	Ref
2019	LINE TV Awards	Best Couple	Pick – Rome (from *Our Skyy*)	Won	
