= Cat for Cash =

2026 Thai television series

- Official series poster
- Thai: เปย์รักด้วยแมวเลี้ยง
- Genre: Boys' love; Romantic comedy; Fantasy
- Directed by: Kornprom Niyomsil
- Starring: Kanaphan Puitrakul; Thanawat Ratanakitpaisan
- Country of origin: Thailand
- Original language: Thai
- No. of episodes: 10

Production
- Executive producer: Sataporn Panichraksapong
- Running time: 44–52 minutes
- Production companies: GMMTV; Gemmistry Studio

Original release
- Network: GMM 25; iQIYI
- Release: 20 January – 24 March 2026

Cat for Cash (Thai: เปย์รักด้วยแมวเลี้ยง; RTGS: Pe Rak Duai Maeo Liang, lit. 'Lavishing Love with a Pet Cat') is a 2026 Thai television series starring Kanaphan Puitrakul (First) and Thanawat Ratanakitpaisan (Khaotung). Directed by Kornprom Niyomsil (Au) and produced by GMMTV together with Gemmistry Studio, it was announced at the GMMTV 2025 Riding the Wave event on 26 November 2024. The series premiered on GMM 25 and TrueVisions Now on 20 January 2026, airing on Tuesdays at 20:30 ICT. The series concluded on 24 March 2026.

== Synopsis ==
Tiger (Kanaphan Puitrakul), a virtuous, cat-loving creditor, inherits the unique ability to communicate with cats from Auntie Meow (Fresh Arisara), the late owner of a cat cafe. Before her passing, the cats beg Tiger to save the cafe from Auntie Meow's son, Lynx (Thanawat Ratanakitpaisan), who intends to take over. Tiger faces obstacles from Lynx's half-brother, Leo (Kittiphop Sereevichayasawat), and a local veterinarian, Dr. Pom (Sapol Assawamunkong). These clashing dynamics create numerous complications at the cafe, ultimately leading to family reconciliations and romantic developments driven by Tiger's ability.

== Cast and characters ==
=== Main ===
- Kanaphan Puitrakul (First) as Tiger
- Thanawat Ratanakitpaisan (Khaotung) as Lynx

=== Supporting ===
- Kittiphop Sereevichayasawat (Satang) as Leo
- Arisara Wongchalee (Fresh) as Meow (Lynx's mother)
- Chayakorn Jutamas (JJ) as Krapor
- Sapol Assawamunkong (Pom) as Dr. Pom, D.V.M.

=== Guest ===
- Poothanate Hongmanop (Captain) as Wichian (Ep. 7)
- Phromphiriya Thongputtaruk (Papang) as Hongtae (Ep. 8)
- Thanawin Pholcharoenrat (Winny) as Pug (Pom's younger brother) (Ep. 8, 10)

== Soundtrack ==
Song title	Artist	Ref.
"ภาษารัก (Love Language)"	Bonnie Pattraphus	
"บ้านของหัวใจ (Found My Home)"	First Kanaphan, Khaotung Thanawat	
