= A Boss and a Babe =

2023 Thai television series

- Official series poster
- Thai: ชอกะเชร์คู่กันต์
- Genre: Romantic Comedy; Drama
- Based on: "Khob Wanni Loek Kan Pi Mai #chokacherkhugun" (คบวันนี้ เลิกกันปีใหม่ #ชอกะเชร์คู่กันต์) by Brave2Y (หน่วยกลว้าวาย)
- Screenplay by: Inthira Thanasarnsumrit
- Directed by: Siwaj Sawatmaneekul
- Starring: Jiratchapong Srisang; Kasidet Plookphol
- Opening theme: "มีเธอนี่แหละดี (My Luck)" by Book Kasidet
- Ending theme: "แค่คนตัวเล็กๆ (Selfless)" by Louis Thanawin
- Composer: Nattawat Somsamai
- Country of origin: Thailand
- Original language: Thai
- No. of episodes: 12

Production
- Executive producers: Sataporn Panichraksapong; Darapa Choeysanguan
- Producer: Nuttapong Mongkolsawas
- Cinematography: Saran Jantharakkha
- Running time: 40-45 minutes
- Production companies: GMMTV; Studio Wabi Sabi

Original release
- Network: GMM 25; Viu
- Release: March 3 – May 19, 2023

Related
- Our Skyy 2

A Boss and a Babe (Thai: ชอกะเชร์คู่กันต์ lit. 'Together, Cher and Gun'; RTGS: Cho Ka Cher Khu Gun) is a 2023 Thai boys' love television series starring Jiratchapong Srisang (Force) and Kasidet Plookphol (Book) based on the novel by Brave2Y (หน่วยกลว้าวาย).

It aired on GMM 25 on March 3, 2023, airing every Friday at 20:30 ICT, and was available for streaming on Viu at 22:30 ICT the same day. Directed by Siwaj Sawatmaneekul and produced by GMMTV and Studio Wabi Sabi, it was announced at the GMMTV 2023: Diversely Yours press event on November 22, 2022.

== Synopsis ==
When Cher (Kasidet Plookphol), a final-year university student, starts an internship at a struggling game company owned by Gun (Jiratchapong Srisang), what was supposed to be a peaceful internship turns into something much more. Cher's quick wit catches the eye of the boss, but not just as an intern. Besides his gaming skills as a E-sports athlete known as Laem, Cher also runs an ASMR channel. These are the only videos that lull the boss to sleep every night, so it's no surprise he recognises his babe's voice instantly.

== Cast and characters ==
=== Main ===
- Jiratchapong Srisang (Force) as Gungawin (Gun)
- Kasidet Plookphol (Book) as Saran Thepthat (Cher) / Laem

=== Supporting ===
- Chinnarat Siriphongchawalit (Mike) as Jack
- Pusit Dittapisit (Fluke) as Thi
- Thipakorn Thitathan (Ohm) as Zo
- Leo Saussay as Tub
- Bhobdhama Hansa (Java) as Thup
- Bhasidi Petchsutee (Lookjun) as Thian
- Sattabut Laedeke (Drake) as Time
- Thinnaphan Tantui (Thor) as Porsche
- Yardpirun Poolun (Namyard) as Oi
- Waratchaya Noliam (Aomsin) as Ink

=== Guest ===
- Patsit Permpoonsavat (Soodyacht) as Barista (Ep. 1, 8, 11)
- Natphichamon Singkornwat (Yongyee) as Gun's mother (Ep. 9–12)

== Original soundtrack ==
The official soundtrack for A Boss and a Babe features:

Song	Artist(s)	Label	Ref.
"มีเธอนี่แหละดี (My Luck)"	Book Kasidet	GMMTV Records	
"แค่คนตัวเล็กๆ (Selfless)"	Louis Thanawin	GMMTV Records	
