= Enchanté (TV series) =

2022 Thai television series

- Official series poster
- Thai: ใครคืออองชองเต
- Genre: Romantic comedy; Boys' Love
- Created by: Kittisak Kongka
- Based on: Enchanté by NinePinta
- Directed by: Pawis Sowsrion
- Starring: Kasidet Plookphol; Jiratchapong Srisang
- Opening theme: "ยินดีที่รู้ใจ (Enchanté)" by Tay Tawan
- Ending theme: "ยินดีที่รู้ใจ (Enchanté)" by Tay Tawan
- Composer: Anuroth Ketlekha
- Country of origin: Thailand
- Original languages: Thai; French
- No. of episodes: 10

Production
- Executive producers: Sataporn Panichraksapong; Darapa Choeysanguan
- Producers: Pawis Sowsrion; Sakon Wongsinwiset; Pattarawalai Wongsinwises; Rittikrai Kanjanawiphu; Sureechay Kaewses
- Cinematography: Anansit Inklub
- Running time: 40-45 minutes
- Production company: GMMTV

Original release
- Network: GMM 25
- Release: 28 January – 1 April 2022

Enchanté (Thai: ใครคืออองชองเต RTGS: Khrai Khue [Enchanté], lit. 'Who is Enchanté?') is a 2022 Thai boys' love romantic comedy television series starring Kasidet Plookphol (Book) and Jiratchapong Srisang (Force), based on the novel of the same name by NinePinta. It is directed by Pawis Sowsrion and produced by GMMTV. Enchanté was introduced as one of GMMTV's "GMMTV 2021: The New Decade Begins" event on 3 December 2020. It officially premiered on January 28, 2022, on GMM 25, every Friday at 20:30 IST (8:30pm).

== Synopsis ==
Theo (Kasidet Plookphol) suddenly moved to France during childhood to live with his grandmother. However, after the sudden death of his grandmother, he moves back to Thailand. Theo meets his childhood friend and neighbour Akk (Jiratchapong Srisang) who welcomes him back and helps Theo settle in. Theo joins the university that his father owns, majoring in literature. Due to Theo's father owning the university, Theo is already popular as he joins.

One day, Theo finds a book in the University library. Theo writes a message in the book, not expecting a response. When Theo opens the book the next time, an anonymous responder signs themselves as 'Enchanté', meaning 'Nice to meet you' in French. Theo becomes curious of who 'Enchanté' may be. Akk puts posters around the university to help Theo find out who 'Enchanté' is. Four male university students come forward claiming they are 'Enchanté', Saifa (Gawin Caskey), Natee (Pusit Dittapisit), Wayo (Tharatorn Jantharaworakarn) and Phupha (Thanaboon Kiatniran).

Will Theo, with the help of Akk, find out who the anonymous 'Enchanté' is?

== Cast and characters ==
=== Main ===
- Kasidet Plookphol (Book) as Theo Asawa-ekanan
- Jiratchapong Srisang (Force) as Akk Itsara

=== Supporting ===
- Gawin Caskey (Fluke) as Saifa
- Pusit Dittapisit (Fluke) as Natee
- Tharatorn Jantharaworakarn (Boom) as Wayo
- Thanaboon Kiatniran (Aou) as Phupha
- Chayakorn Jutamas (JJ) as Ton
- Napat Patcharachavalit (Aun) as Tan
- Nalinthip Phoemphattharasakun (Fon) as Im
- Keetapat Pongruea (Pleng) as Egg
- Narumon Phongsupan (Koy) as Amphawa
- Oliver Poupart (An) as Dr. Thamrong
- Jitaraphol Potiwihok (Jimmy) as Sun
- Yongwaree Anilbol (Fah) as Fon

=== Guest ===
- Pawis Sowsrion (Film) (Ep. 1)
- Ravipon Pumruang (Aea) as Saifa’s boss (Ep. 2, 8)
- Darina Boonchu (Nancy) as Nancy (Ep. 4)
- Kanlaya Lerdkasemsub (Ngek) as Phupha’s mother (Ep. 5)
- Thanat Lowkhunsombat (Lee) as Punn (Ep. 10)
- Purim Rattanaruangwattana (Pluem) as Krating (Ep. 10)

== Soundtrack ==
Song title (Official Spelling)	Romanized title (RTGS)	English title	Artist	Ref.
ยินดีที่รู้ใจ	Yin-Deē Têē Róō Zhai	"Enchanté"	Tay Tawan	
รู้แค่ผมรักคุณก็พอ	Roo Kae Pom Rak Koon Gaw Paw	"Je t’aime à la folie"	Fluke Gawin	

== Reception ==
=== Viewership ===
- In the table below, the blue number represents the lowest ratings and the red number represents the highest ratings.

Episode No.	Timeslot (UTC+07:00)	Air date	Average audience share	Ref.
1	Friday, 8:30pm	28 January 2022	0.146%	
2	Friday, 8:30pm	4 February 2022	0.126%	
3	Friday, 8:30pm	11 February 2022	0.072%	
4	Friday, 8:30pm	18 February 2022	0.027%	
5	Friday, 8:30pm	25 February 2022	0.084%	
6	Friday, 8:30pm	4 March 2022	0.061%	
7	Friday, 8:30pm	11 March 2022	0.146%	
8	Friday, 8:30pm	18 March 2022	0.095%	
9	Friday, 8:30pm	25 March 2022	0.102%	
10	Friday, 8:30pm	1 April 2022	0.052%	
Average			0.91% ^{1}	

^1 Based on the average audience share per episode.
