= Peaceful Property =

2024 Thai television series

- Official series poster
- บ้านหลอน On Sale
- Genre: Horror; Drama; Comedy; Supernatural; Bromance
- Directed by: Jarupat Kannula
- Starring: Thitipoom Techaapaikhun; Tawan Vihokratana; Ployshompoo Supasap; Worranit Thawornwong
- Country of origin: Thailand
- Original language: Thai
- No. of episodes: 12

Production
- Running time: 48 minutes
- Production companies: GMMTV; Parbdee Taweesuk

Original release
- Network: GMM 25; Viu
- Release: 28 August – 13 November 2024

Peaceful Property (Thai: บ้านหลอน On Sale; RTGS: Ban Lon On Sale; lit. Haunted House On Sale) is a Thai supernatural comedy television series starring Thitipoom Techaapaikhun (New), Tawan Vihokratana (Tay), Ployshompoo Supasap (Jan) and Worranit Thawornwong (Mook).

Directed by Jarupat Kannula (Dome) and produced by GMMTV together with Parbdee Taweesuk, it was announced as one of the television series of GMMTV for 2024 during their "GMMTV2024: UP&ABOVE Part 1" event held on October 17, 2023. It officially premiered on GMM 25 and Viu on August 28, 2024, and ran until November 13, 2024.

== Synopsis ==
Home (Thitipoom Techaapaikhun) is an heir of a prominent Thai elite family. He wastes his family's money in the USA while living life to the fullest every day. Despite the fact that many people are envious of his life, he secretly feels lonely because no one has ever made him feel at "home". When his grandfather died, Home as his biological grandson has to go back to Thailand to receive his inheritance. Initially, he intends to sell all of the assets he inherits, regardless of their value, in order to maintain his opulent and carefree lifestyle. But when he learns that he is left with a large amount of land and properties—but they are not typical real estate—everything changes. No one would purchase any of the properties that Home receives since they are all said to be haunted!

On the other hand, Peach (Tawan Vihokratana), a professional chef, has his life changed drastically after he has a serious accident. He starts to have the ability to see ghosts in the house, which upsets his TikTok-addicted sister Pangpang (Ployshompoo Supasap). One day, Peach visits a housewarming party that turns out to be full of ghosts, so Pangpang makes a TikTok video of the event, and it goes viral. Home is furious when he sees the video, so he and Lawyer Kan (Worranit Thawornwong) find Peach and demand that he take responsibility by banishing the ghosts from the place... and other things.

== Cast and characters ==
=== Main ===
- Thitipoom Techaapaikhun (New) as Saharat Vimarnsukman (Home)
- Tawan Vihokratana (Tay) as Santiphap Tantitaymitr (Peach)
- Ployshompoo Supasap (Jan) as Pangpang
- Worranit Thawornwong (Mook) as Kan

=== Supporting ===
- Charas Fuangaromya (Taem) as Samai Vimarnsukman
- Kasab Champadib (Ong) as Somkid Vimarnsukman
- Puttachat Pongsuchat (Tui) as Somphon Vimarnsukman
- Poramath Samart (New) as Suradech
- Kittipol Kesmanee (Pu) as Yai

=== Guest ===
- Kristina Ostapenko as Kathy (Ep. 1)
- Tachakorn Boonlupyanun (Godji) as Fan Singsing (Ep. 1)
- Kieranitch Thammanit (Thank) as Fan Singsing's disciple (Ep. 1)
- Suphach Tawsagun (Boky) as young Home (Ep. 1, 3)
- Tanapon Sukumpantanasan (Perth) as Best (Ep. 1, 5, 10)
- Panachai Sriariyarungruang (Junior) as Ju (Ep. 2)
- Chayapat Wiratyosin (Milo) as Mi (Ep. 2)
- Tatchapol Thitiapichai (Tanthai) as Tan (Ep. 2)
- Panupat Sutirak as Aek (Ep. 2)
- Rutricha Phapakithi (Ciize) as Rak Suksanguan (Ep. 2)
- Puttipong Jitbut (Chokun) as Ride (Ep. 3)
- Jennie Panhan as Tarnsai (Ep. 3)
- Yoojin Joo (Victoria) as Cherry (Ep. 4)
- Patara Eksangkul (Book) as Chobkol (Ep. 4, 11)
- Niti Chaichitathorn (Pompam) as Chai-un (Ep. 5–6)
- Kasidet Plookphol (Book) as Vicha Kannula (Ep. 7)
- Jiratchapong Srisang (Force) as young Phoom (Ep. 7)
- Narin Puwanacharoen (A) as Phoom (Ep. 7, 11)
- Sittawasilp Kabilchonlathit (Ofah) as young Somkid (Ep. 11)
- Natchaphat Kerdmuangsamut (Than) as young Somjai Vimarnsukman (Ep. 11–12)

== Soundtrack ==
Song title	English title	Artist	Ref.
ผีหยอก	Haunted House	Tay Tawan, New Thitipoom	
