= Tonhon Chonlatee =

2020–21 Thai television series

- Official series poster
- Thai: ต้นหนชลธี
- Genre: Boys' love; Romance; Drama; Comedy
- Directed by: Ekkasit Trakulkasemsuk
- Starring: Suphakorn Sriphothong; Thanawat Rattanakitpaisan
- Country of origin: Thailand
- Original language: Thai
- No. of seasons: 1
- No. of episodes: 10

Production
- Producers: Nattapong Mongkolsawat; Sataporn Panichraksapong
- Running time: 50 - 70 minutes
- Production companies: GMMTV; Keng Kwang Kang

Original release
- Network: GMM 25; AIS Play
- Release: 13 November 2020 – 22 January 2021

Tonhon Chonlatee (Thai: ต้นหนชลธี; RTGS: Tonhon Chonlathi) is a 2020 Thai boys' love television series starring Suphakorn Sriphothong (Pod) and Thanawat Rattanakitpaisan (Khaotung). Directed by Ekkasit Trakulkasemsuk and produced by GMMTV together with Keng Kwang Kang, the series is one of the two television series launched by GMMTV together with AIS Play on 8 July 2020. It premiered on GMM 25 and AIS Play on 13 November 2020, airing on Fridays at 21:30 ICT.

This serves as a reunion project for Thanawat Rattanakitpaisan (Khaotung), Jirakit Kuariyakul (Toptap), Chinnarat Siriphongchawalit (Mike), Sivakorn Lertchuchot (Guy) and Chanagun Arpornsutinan (Gunsmile) after the hit boys' love series 2gether: The Series, wherein the said series was also featured in Episode 9 of the series.

== Synopsis ==
Chonlatee (Thanawat Rattanakitpaisan) is a shy, kind-hearted boy, who has a crush secretly on Tonhon (Suphakorn Sriphotong), the guy next door, since their childhood days. Tonhon has always taken care of him as if they were real "brothers". But Chonlatee watching Tonhon and his girlfriend Amp from a distance. That is until destiny favors him when Tonhon updates his status as single. Chonlatee then decides to change his look to get Tonhon's attention and love.

Their closeness starts to change into a deeper bond. Tonhon starts to get confused about his feelings. His mouth keeps saying that he doesn't think of Chonlatee that way but when Chonlatee goes out with someone else, he feels insecure, being possessive and worried about Chonlatee. And in the midst of that, his ex-girlfriend, Amp, returns to pursue Tonhon's feelings back.

== Cast and characters ==
=== Main ===
- Suphakorn Sriphothong (Pod) as Tonhon/Ton - Chonlatee's childhood best friend who he's pretending that Chonlatee is just a "brother" to him.
- Thanawat Rattanakitpaisan (Khaotung) as Chonlatee/Chon - Tonhon's childhood best friend who has had a secret crush on Tonhon since their childhood.

=== Supporting ===
- Jirakit Kuariyakul (Toptap) as Ai - Ni's boyfriend and Tonhon's best friend and housemate
- Chinnarat Siriphongchawalit (Mike) as Ni - Ai's boyfriend and Tonhon's best friend and housemate
- Phatchara Tubthong (Kapook) as Amp - Tonhon's ex-girlfriend
- Apichaya Saejung (Ciize) as Pang - Chonlatee's childhood best friend.
- Trai Nimtawat (Neo) as Na - Chonlatee and Pang's self-described rich and good-looking friend who has a crush on Chonlatee.
- Ployshompoo Supasap (Jan) as Miriam - a "call girl" helped by Ai and Ni, and a housemate and friend of Chonlatee who is a big fan of boys' love series.
- Chanagun Arpornsutinan (Gunsmile) as Neung - A senior in the campus who has a crush for Chonlatee.
- Wanpiya Oamsinnoppakul (Gwang) as Baipai - Ton's sister and Itt's wife.
- Sivakorn Lertchuchot (Guy) as Itt - Ton's brother-in-law and Baipai's husband.
- Jennifer Kim as Mae Nam - Chon's mother
- Kalaya Lerdkasemsap (Ngek) as Amporn - Ton's mother
- Dilok Thongwattana (Moo) as Chaeron - Ton's father

=== Guest ===
- Thanathorn Khuankaew (Jom) as Por
- Samitpong Sakulpongchai (Tong) as Ken

== Soundtrack ==
Song title	Romanized title	English title	Artist	Ref.
ไม่มีวันไหนไม่รัก	Mai Mi Wan Nai Mai Rak	"Never Love"	Saranyu Winaipanit (Ice)	
