= Only Friends =

2023 Thai television series

- Official series poster
- เพื่อนต้องห้าม
- Genre: Drama; Boys' Love
- Directed by: Tichakorn Phukhaotong; Pinya Chookamsri
- Starring: Kanaphan Puitrakul; Thanawat Rattanakitpaisan; Jiratchapong Srisang; Kasidet Plookphol; Trai Nimtawat; Pakin Kunaanuwit
- Opening theme: "เอาเลยมั้ย (Let’s Try)" (Instrumental)
- Ending theme: "รัก…แล้วได้อะไร (So What?)" by Ford Arun
- Country of origin: Thailand
- Original language: Thai
- No. of episodes: 12

Production
- Executive producers: Sataporn Panichraksapong; Darapa Choeysanguan
- Running time: 50–80 minutes
- Production company: GMMTV

Original release
- Network: GMM 25
- Release: August 12 – October 28, 2023

Related
- Only Friends: Dream On

Only Friends (Thai: เพื่อนต้องห้าม lit. 'Forbidden Friends') is a 2023 Thai television series starring Kanaphan Puitrakul (First), Thanawat Rattanakitpaisan (Khaotung), Jiratchapong Srisang (Force), Kasidet Plookphol (Book), Trai Nimtawat (Neo) and Pakin Kunaanuwit (Mark), exploring the theme of friends-with-benefits relationships among youth. It is directed by Tichakorn Phukhaotong and Pinya Chookamsri and produced by GMMTV. The series was announced at the GMMTV 2023: Diversely Yours press event on November 22, 2022. The series premiered on GMM 25 on August 12, 2023, and concluded on October 28, 2023, after 12 episodes. It serves as a standalone series in a shared universe with Only Friends: Dream On (2026).

== Synopsis ==
Alcohol, drugs, pheromones, partying and music lead a group of university students to become entangled in love, passion and secrets. Lines will be crossed and friendships will be broken. Will they become something more, or will they remain only friends?

Mew has spent the last four years of university only focusing on his studies, leaving no time for sex or relationships. His friend Boston wants Mew to finally lose his virginity and introduces him to Top, intending for them to have a one-night stand. However, he is not happy when Top wants a relationship with Mew instead. Meanwhile, bar singer Sand begins to fall for Ray after spending time together, but Ray is in love with his best friend, Mew. Elsewhere, Boston becomes friends with benefits with IT guy Nick, but Nick wants to make their relationship exclusive.

== Cast and characters ==
=== Main ===
- Kanaphan Puitrakul (First) as Sand
- Thanawat Rattanakitpaisan (Khaotung) as Ray Pakon
- Jiratchapong Srisang (Force) as Top Tanin
- Kasidet Plookphol (Book) as Mew Witsarut
- Trai Nimtawat (Neo) as Boston
- Pakin Kunaanuwit (Mark) as Nick

=== Supporting ===
- Bhasidi Petchsutee (Lookjun) as Namcheum
- Pitchaporn Kirdpan (Nonnie) as April
- Jennie Panhan as Yo
- Teeradech Vitheepanich (Tee) as Plug
- Kirati Puangmalee (Title) as Atom

=== Guest ===
- Sattabut Laedeke (Drake) as Gap
- Phromphiriya Thongputtaruk (Papang) as Dan
- Tanutchai Wijitvongtong (Mond) as Boeing
- Kankanueng Netsrithong Damrongsakul (Meen) as Sand's mom
- Gandhi Wasuwitchayagit as Boston's dad
- Saifah Tanthana as Ray's dad

== Episodes ==
No.	Title	Original release date
1	"What's Your Role in a Bar?"	12 August 2023
Ray, Mew, Boston and Namcheum begin working on their university project to develop a hostel. Boston introduces Top to the friend group to help with the design work; Top and Mew instantly make a connection beyond their project. Meanwhile, Boston meets IT boy Nick and bar singer Sand looks after a drunk Ray.
2	"My Favorite Man"	19 August 2023
Mew asks Top for a restart after Top's public proposal to be boyfriends at Yo's bar. Ray finds himself in need of company as all his friends are busy without him. Nick and Boston begin to hook up regularly, but Boston makes it clear that he is not interested in anything serious.
3	"What am I to you?"	19 August 2023
Ray, Mew, Boston and Namcheum prepare for a pool party at the "Only Friends Hostel". Nick stresses over the status of his relationship with Boston. Boston approaches Top with some information about Mew and Ray's relationship.
4	"Emergency Contact"	2 September 2023
Sand is upset after being ditched at the party. Ray reflects on his past, while Mew sets boundaries for their friendship. Nick confronts Top about his night in the car with Boston.
5	"The Extra Hour"	9 September 2023
Ray spends the day with Sand to get to know him better. Mew begins to feel ready to take his relationship with Top a step further. Nick makes some changes in his life by buying a new wardrobe and going to the gym.
6	"Happy (F*cking) Birthday"	16 September 2023
The group gathers at Yo's bar to celebrate Mew's birthday. However, relationships are impacted after a quarrel between Top and Sand sets off a chain of events.
7	"After Effect"	23 September 2023
Mew sets his sights on revenge after learning about Boston and Top's relationship at his birthday party. Meanwhile, Sand takes care of Ray following his car accident.
8	"Save Me"	30 September 2023
Ray and Mew decide to throw a Halloween party at the hostel, inviting everyone to join, but things take a turn for the worse when the police show up.
9	"The Return"	7 October 2023
Sand and Nick go on a trip together, while Ray struggles with his competing feelings for Mew and Sand. Elsewhere, Top tries to get back on Mew's good side.
10	"Redemption"	14 October 2023
Mew is introduced to Top's ex, Boeing. Sand convinces Ray to go to rehab, while Boston tries to make amends with Nick
11	"Move On, Move In"	21 October 2023
Mew's efforts to punish Top by spending time with Boeing puts a strain on their attempt to move forward. Sand meets his ex while at the bar with Ray. Boston and Nick discuss their future together as Boston grows closer to leaving for America.
12	"Begin Again"	28 October 2023
The group celebrates New Year's Eve together and the "Only Friends Hostel" finally opens its doors. Which couples will stay together, and who will remain only friends?

== Soundtrack ==
Title	Artist	Ref.
"เอาเลยมั้ย (Let’s Try)"	Thanawat Rattanakitpaisan (Khaotung)	
"รัก…แล้วได้อะไร (So What?)"	Arun Asawasuebsakul (Ford)	

== Awards and nominations ==
Year	Award	Category	Recipient	Result	Ref.
2023	Y Universe Awards	Outstanding Series	Only Friends	Nominated	
2023	Y Universe Awards	Outstanding Lead Actor	Thanawat Rattanakitpaisan	Nominated	
2023	Y Universe Awards	Outstanding Supporting Actor	Trai Nimtawat	Nominated	
2023	Y Universe Awards	Outstanding Supporting Actor	Pakin Kuna-anuvit	Nominated	
2023	Y Universe Awards	Outstanding Director	Pinya Chookamsri	Nominated	
2023	Y Universe Awards	Outstanding Director	Tichakorn Phukhaotong	Nominated	
2023	Y Universe Awards	Outstanding Writing	Only Friends	Nominated	
2023	Y Universe Awards	Outstanding Theme Song	Thanawat Rattanakitpaisan	Nominated	
2023	Y Universe Awards	Outstanding Socially Reflective Television Media	Only Friends	Nominated	
2024	Kazz Awards	Series of the Year	Only Friends	Pending	
2024	HiBL! Awards	Best Series	Only Friends	Won	
2024	HiBL! Awards	Best Actor	Thanawat Rattanakitpaisan	Won	
2024	HiBL! Awards	Best Couple	First & Khaotung	Won	
2024	HiBL! Awards	Best OST	Thanawat Rattanakitpaisan	Won	
2024	Thailand Social Awards	Best Content Performance on Social Media	Only Friends	Pending	
2024	29th Asian Television Awards	Best Actor in a Leading Role	Thanawat Rattanakitpaisan	Nominated	
2024	29th Asian Television Awards	Best Original Screenplay	Panuwat Intawat, Tichakorn Phukhaotong & Kittisak Kongka	Nominated	
2024	29th Asian Television Awards	Best Theme Song	"เอาเลยมั้ย (Let’s Try)"	Nominated	
2024	29th Asian Television Awards	Best Direction (Drama, ASEAN)	Pinya Chookamsri & Tichakorn Phukhaotong	Nominated	
2024	29th Asian Television Awards	Best Cinematography	Rath Roongrueangtantisook	Nominated	

== Tours ==
Year	Title	Date	Venue	Ref.
2023	Only Friends Final EP. Fan Meeting	October 28, 2023	Siam Pavalai Royal Grand Theater, Siam Paragon	
2023	Only Friends Fan Meeting in Japan	December 9, 2023	Saitama Hall	
2024	Only Friends Fan Meeting in Taipei	April 7, 2024	NTU Sports Center	
2024	Only Friends Fan Meeting in Hong Kong	June 15, 2024	AXA Dreamland	
2024	Only Friends Fan Meeting in Vietnam	July 6, 2024	Hoa Binh Theater	
2024	Only Friends Fan Meeting in Manila	August 24, 2024	New Frontier Theater	
