= Trai Nimtawat =

Thai actor and former basketball player (born 2001)

- ตรัย นิ่มทวัฒน์
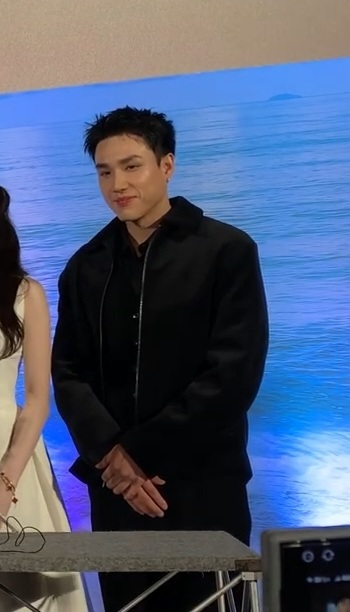
- Neo in November 2025
- Born: January 14, 2001 (age 25); Bangkok, Thailand
- Other name: Neo
- Occupation: Actor
- Agent: GMMTV
- Height: 179 cm (5 ft 10 in)

Trai Nimtawat (Thai: ตรัย นิ่มทวัฒน์, born 14 January 2001), nicknamed Neo (Thai: นีโอ) is a Thai actor signed to GMMTV, for which he is best known for his roles in Fish upon the Sky (2021), The Eclipse (2022), and Only Friends (2023). He is also a former basketball player and a member of Thailand's national youth team, who won bronze at the 2018 ASEAN School Games.

== Early life and education ==
Trai was born and raised in Bangkok, Thailand. He completed his secondary education at Bangkok Christian College and is currently studying at Bangkok University in the Faculty of Business Ownership and Management.

== Career ==
In 2018, at the age of 16, Trai was signed as an artist under the production and talent agency GMMTV and subsequently quit his basketball career to focus on acting. That same year, he made his acting television debut as a main character in the series 'Cause You're My Boy. He continued to act with roles in Wolf, Tonhon Chonlatee, and the Girl Next Room series.

In 2021, Trai played a main role alongside Thanawin Teeraphosukarn (Louis) in Fish upon the Sky. They would then work together again in The Eclipse and reprise their roles in the anthology series Our Skyy 2.

In 2023, Trai made his film acting debut in My Precious. Later that year, he joined the cast of the ensemble series Only Friends as Boston, and played Fire in Cooking Crush.

In 2024, Trai reprised his role of Mai in the television adaptation of My Precious: The Series. He also starred in A Love So Beautiful and in 2025 he appeared in the series, My Golden Blood. He is currently set to reprise his role as Boston in the upcoming series, Only Friends: Dream On.

== Filmography ==
=== Television series ===
Key
†	Denotes television productions that have not yet been released

Year	Title	Role	Notes	Ref
2018	'Cause You're My Boy	Gord	Main role	
2018	Our Skyy	Gord	Supporting role	
2019	Wolf	Bank	Supporting role	
2019	Dark Blue Kiss	Gord	Guest role	
2020	Girl Next Room: Motorbike Baby	Sky	Supporting role	
2020	Girl Next Room: Midnight Fantasy	Sky	Supporting role	
2020	Girl Next Room: Richy Rich	Sky	Supporting role	
2020	Girl Next Room: Security Love	Sky	Supporting role	
2020	Tonhon Chonlatee	Na	Supporting role	
2021	Fish upon the Sky	"Duean" Dollawee	Main role	
2022	Vice Versa	"Up" Preeda	Supporting role	
2022	The Eclipse	"Khan" Khanlong	Supporting role	
2023	Our Skyy 2	"Khan" Khanlong	Supporting role	
2023	Midnight Motel	Tony	Guest role (Ep. 5)	
2023	Only Friends	Boston	Main role	
2023	Cooking Crush	"Fire" Akkhi Phloengphirotchotchuangchatchawan	Supporting role	
2024	My Precious The Series	Mai	Supporting role	
2024	A Love So Beautiful	"Tao" Nakrop Sutpreecha	Supporting role	
2025	My Golden Blood	Tonkla	Supporting role	
2025	That Summer	Tum	Supporting role	
2025	MuTeLuv: Diva Deva Mata	"Kat" Katrina Wangrareng	Main role	
2026	Only Friends: Dream On	Boston	Supporting role	
2026	Mr. Kill	"Nop" Nopphan Kongkram	Supporting role	
TBA	Surf 'n' Love †	Boat	Supporting role	
TBA	Plan B to U †	TBA	Supporting role	
TBA	Shooting Stars †	Ohm	Supporting role	
TBA	Your Eyes, My Ears †	TBA	Supporting role	

=== Films ===
Year	Title	Role	Notes	Ref
2023	My Precious	Mai	Support role	
