= Kasidet Plookphol =

Thai actor, model, and singer (born 1996)

- กษิดิ์เดช ปลูกผล
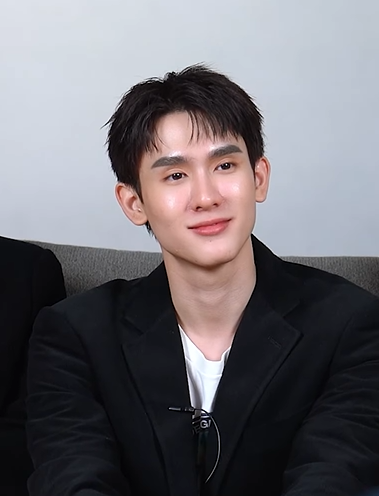
- Kasidet in April 2025
- Born: 25 October 1996 (age 30); Bangkok, Thailand
- Other name: Book (บุ๊ค)
- Education: King Mongkut's University of Technology Thonburi
- Occupations: Actor; Model
- Years active: 2020–present
- Agent: GMMTV
- Known for: Theo in Enchanté; Cher in A Boss and a Babe; Mew in Only Friends; Arm in Perfect 10 Liners; Phleng in Melody of Secrets; Yong in Lovers & Gangsters
- Height: 181 cm (5 ft 11 1/2 in)
- Musical career
- Genre: T-pop
- Instrument: Vocals
- Label: JomeFam
- Formerly of: Cute Chef

Kasidet Plookphol (Thai: กษิดิ์เดช ปลูกผล; born 25 October 1996), nicknamed Book (Thai: บุ๊ค), is a Thai actor and singer under GMMTV. He is a former member of the boy band Cute Chef under JomeFam. He is known for his roles on the television series Enchanté (2022), A Boss and a Babe (2023), Only Friends (2023) and Perfect 10 Liners (2024).

== Early life and education ==
Kasidet was born and raised in Bangkok, Thailand. He completed his primary education at Patai Udom Suksa School and his secondary education at Sarawittaya School. He later received his bachelor's degree from the Faculty of Engineering, King Mongkut's University of Technology Thonburi.

== Career ==
In 2018, he began his career as a member of the boy group Cute Chef under JomeFam during his university years, including his fellow GMMTV artist Sahaphap Wongratch.

In 2020, Kasidet made his television acting debut as a supporting character in the series Friend Forever and made a cameo appearance as himself in the film Pojaman Sawang Ka Ta. In the same year, he was signed as an artist by the production and talent agency GMMTV.

In 2022, he landed his first main role as Theo in the series Enchanté alongside Jiratchapong Srisang (Force). Both of them gained recognition as ForceBook, leading to more numerous joint projects. Before their partnership on the screen, they are already close friends who attended the same school from kindergarten to high school.

In 2023, Kasidet starred in A Boss and a Babe as Cher, a gamer who plans to excel in e-sports industry but faces unexpected challenges when interning at a company where his boss, Gun (Jiratchapong Srisang), assigns him strange tasks, confusing him about his boss' true intentions. In the same year, both of them reprised their roles in Our Skyy 2 and starred in Only Friends.

In 2024, Kasidet continued his acting works by appearing in Only Boo! and Peaceful Property, also playing a lead role in Perfect 10 Liners (2024) together with Jiratchapong Srisang.

Outside his acting works, he participated in singing several soundtracks for the television series. He also has been involved in various brands partnerships. In January 2024, he attended the Dolce&Gabbana Party during Milan Menswear Fall/Winter 2024–2025 in Milan, Italy, together with Jiratchapong Srisang.

In 2025, he debuted as a voice actor by providing his voice for Inspector Rikuo Hasebe in the Thai version of Japanese animated mystery film Detective Conan: One-eyed Flashback. Then he also participated as one of the main artists in the concert Love Out Loud Fan Fest 2025: Lovemosphere.

== Filmography ==
=== Film ===
Year	Title	Role	Notes
2020	Pojaman Sawang Ka Ta	Himself	Supporting role
2025	Detective Conan: One-eyed Flashback	Inspector Rikuo Hasebe	Voice role, Thai version

=== Television series ===
Key
†	Denotes television productions that have not yet been released

Year	Title	Role	Network	Notes
2020	Friend Forever	Kit	Channel 9	Support role
2022	Enchanté	"Theo" Asawa-ekanan	GMM 25	Main role
2022	Vice Versa	"Theo" Asawa-ekanan	GMM 25	Guest role (Ep. 1)
2022	The Three GentleBros	Sun	GMM 25	Support role
2023	A Boss and a Babe	"Cher" Saran Thepthat / Laem	GMM 25	Main role
2023	Our Skyy 2	"Cher" Saran Thepthat / Laem	GMM 25	Main role
2023	Only Friends	"Mew" Witsarut	GMM 25	Main role
2024	Only Boo!	Shone	GMM 25	Support role
2024	Peaceful Property	"Vicha" Kannula	GMM 25	Guest role (Ep. 7)
2024	Perfect 10 Liners	"Arm" Anon Phuwakomol	GMM 25	Main role
2025	My Magic Prophecy	"Wan" Warayu	GMM 25	Guest role (Ep. 7–8)
2025	Melody of Secrets	"Phleng" Botphleng Thayadol	One 31	Main role
2026	Only Friends: Dream On	"Mew" Witsarut	One 31	Guest role (Ep. 5, 8, 11)
2026	Peach and Me	Himself	GMM 25	Guest role
2026	Lovers & Gangsters	"Yong" Yongyi	One 31	Main role
TBA	Boys 4 Moms †	"Tim" Tubtim	TBA	Main role
TBA	High & Low: Born to Be High †	Puen	TBA	TBA

== Discography ==
=== Cute Chef ===
Year	Title	Notes	Ref.
2018	"กวิน (Gavin)"	Pre-debut digital singles	
2018	"ฮักเมา (Love Drunk)"	Pre-debut digital singles	
2018	"มะงึกๆอุ๋งๆ (Haguttokyuukyuu)" with Ornly You		
2018	"นะนะน้าเนี้ย (Nananaa Nia)"		

=== Soundtrack appearances ===
Year	Title	Album	Label	Ref.
2023	"มีเธอนี่แหละดี (My Luck)"	A Boss and a Babe OST	GMMTV Records	
2023	"เปลี่ยนใจแล้ว (Second Thoughts)" with Force Jiratchapong	Our Skyy 2 OST	GMMTV Records	
2024	"ผู้ร้ายปากแข็ง (Love Suspect)" with Force Jiratchapong	Perfect 10 Liners OST	GMMTV Records	
2024	"วันนี้ (Perfect)" with Force Jiratchapong, Perth Tanapon, Santa Pongsapak, Junior Panachai, Mark Jiruntanin	Perfect 10 Liners OST	GMMTV Records	
2025	"โลกสีเทา (Dark and Light)"	Melody of Secrets OST	GMMTV Records	

== Fan Meetings ==
Title	Date	Venue	Notes	Ref.
A Boss and a Babe: Final EP. Fan Meeting	May 19, 2023	Siam Pavalai Theatre, Paragon Cineplex	With A Boss and a Babe Cast	
ForceBook Fan Meeting in Japan	July 16, 2023	Shintoshi Hall, Yokohama	With Force	
GMMTV Fan Day 6 in Seoul	August 20, 2023	Naksan Hall, Hansung University	With Force	
GMMTV Fan Day in Bangkok	September 23, 2023	Union Hall, Union Mall	With Force	
ForceBook Fan Meeting in Manila	October 1, 2023	SM North EDSA Skydome	With Force	
ForceBook Fan Meeting in Taipei	October 15, 2023	Legacy Taipei	With Force	
Only Friends: Final EP. Fan Meeting	October 28, 2023	Siam Pavalai Theatre, Paragon Cineplex	With Only Friends Cast	
ForceBook Fan Meeting in Hong Kong	November 3, 2023	KITEC	With Force	
ForceBook Fan Meeting in Italy	December 2, 2023	Hilton Rome Airport Hotel	With Force	
Only Friends Fan Meeting in Japan	December 9, 2023	Saitama Hall	With Only Friends Cast	
ForceBook Fan Meeting in Macau	December 16, 2023	H853 Entertainment Place, Lisboeta Macau	With Force	
Only Friends Fan Meeting in Taipei	April 7, 2024	With Only Friends Cast	NTU Sports Center	
GMMTV Fan Day 10 in Cambodia	June 2, 2024	Naga World-Phnom Penh	With Force	
Only Friends Fan Meeting in Hong Kong	June 15, 2024	AXA Dreamland	With Only Friends Cast	
GMMTV Fan Day 12 in Japan	June 23, 2024	Winc Aichi, Nagoya	With Force	
Only Friends Fan Meeting in Vietnam	July 6, 2024	Hoa Binh Theater	With Only Friends Cast	
Only Friends Fan Meeting in Manila	August 24, 2024	New Frontier Theater	With Only Friends Cast	
Perfect 10 Liners: First Date	October 27, 2024	Siam Pavalai Theatre, Paragon Cineplex	With Perfect 10 Liners Cast	
ForceBook 2nd Fan Meeting in Hong Kong	November 17, 2024	Gordon Wu Hall	With Force	
Book FanEvent in Tokyo	December 14, 2024	Animate Theatre	—N/a	
ForceBook 2nd Fan Meeting in Italy	January 12, 2025	Hilton Rome Airport Hotel	With Force	
Perfect 10 Liners: Bye Nior Fan Party	April 6, 2025	MCC Hall 4th Fl. The Mall Lifestore Ngamwongwan	With Perfect 10 Liners Cast	
Perfect 10 Liners: Bye Nior After Party	April 7, 2025	MCC Hall 4th Fl. The Mall Lifestore Ngamwongwan	With Perfect 10 Liners Cast	
Perfect 10 Liners Fan Meeting in Japan	May 24, 2025	Ebisu The Garden Hall	With Perfect 10 Liners Cast	
Perfect 10 Liners Fan Meeting in Manila	August 23, 2025	Samsung Hall, SM Aura Premier	With Perfect 10 Liners Cast	
Perfect 10 Liners Fan Meeting in Vietnam	October 11, 2025	District 10 Cultural Center	With Perfect 10 Liners Cast	
Melody of Secrets: The 3rd Tune	December 19th, 2025	Siam Pavalai Theatre, Paragon Cineplex	With Melody of Secrets Cast	
Melody of Secrets: Final EP. Fan Meeting	February 13, 2026	Siam Pavalai Theatre, Paragon Cineplex	With Melody of Secrets Cast	
ForceBook Fan Meeting in Ho Chi Minh City	July 26, 2026	C30 Stage	With Force	
GMMTV Fan Day 31 in Taipei	June 13, 2026	Zepp New Taipei	With Force	
GMMTV Fan Day 32 in Singapore	September 5, 2026	The Theatre at Mediacorp	With Force	
GMMTV Fanival: Happy Family	October 10, 2026	Union Hall, Union Mall	With Force	
GMMTV Fan Day 38 in USA	October 21, 2026	Harris Theatre	With Force	
GMMTV Fan Day 38 in USA	October 25, 2026	Woodlawn Theatre	With Force	
Lovers & Gangsters: The Legend Begins	October 30, 2026	Union Hall, Union Mall	With Lovers & Gangsters cast	
ForceBook Fan Meeting in Berlin	December 5, 2026	Estrel Hotel, Berlin	With Force	
ForceBook Fan Meeting in Manila	December 12, 2026	Solaire North Ballroom	With Force	
GMMTV Fan Day 2027: Tokyo	February 13–14, 2027	New Pier Hall, Tokyo	With Force	
GMMTV Fan Day 2027: Taipei	April 17–18, 2027	Zepp New Taipei, Honhui Plaza	With Force	
