= Thitiwat Ritprasert =

Thai actor and model (born 1997)

- ฐิติวัฒน์ ฤทธิ์ประเสริฐ
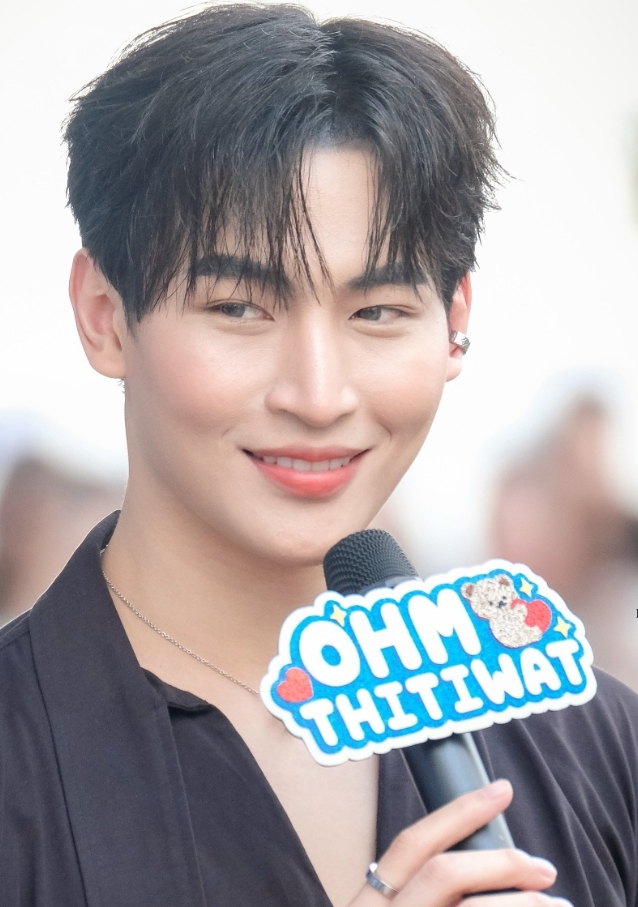
- Thitiwat in February 2026
- Born: 26 March 1997 (age 29); Chiang Rai, Thailand
- Other name: Ohm (โอห์ม)
- Education: Rajamangala University of Technology Thanyaburi
- Occupation: Actor
- Years active: 2017–present
- Agent(s): Channel 8 (Thailand) (2017-2024); GMMTV (2024–present)
- Known for: Dean in Until We Meet Again
- Height: 186 cm (6 ft 1 in)
- Website: GMMTV Artists

Thitiwat Ritprasert (Thai: ฐิติวัฒน์ ฤทธิ์ประเสริฐ; born 26 March 1997), nicknamed Ohm (Thai: โอห์ม), is a Thai actor. He is best known for his roles in Until We Meet Again (2019).

== Early life and education ==
Thitiwat was born in Chiang Rai, Thailand. He graduated from Rajamangala University of Technology Thanyaburi with a bachelor's degree in the Faculty of Mass Communication Technology.

== Career ==
Thitiwat entered the entertainment industry by participating in the CH8 Asia New Star Model Contest Face of Thailand 2016, where he won the competition. He also received a special award at the Asia Model Festival FACE of ASIA 2016.

In 2017, he made his acting debut in the television drama Jai Luang on Channel 8.

In 2019, his popularity increased significantly after portraying the lead role as Dean Ratthanon Wongnate, a university student, the swimming club president, and one of the central characters whose connection to a past-life romance drives the narrative in the television series Until We Meet Again, alongside Natouch Siripongthon (Fluke). The series is based on the novel The Red Thread by Lazy Sheep.

On September 1, 2024, he joined the production and talent agency GMMTV. This move marked his departure from his former company, and at that time his last series under the previous studio had not yet been released or aired—leaving fans uncertain whether it would ever be broadcast. Only weeks after the transfer, his former network, Channel 8, announced the upcoming airing of that final project: Suek Saneha Kraithong Chalawan (also known as Love of the Two Realms). The series draws inspiration from Thai folklore “Kraithong,” depicting the story of Chalawan—the powerful crocodile king who becomes infatuated with the daughters of a wealthy man, Tapaokaew and Tapaothong. Driven by desire, he abducts the sisters and brings them to his underwater palace. Chalawan is portrayed as a formidable and nearly unbeatable antagonist—until the warrior Kraithong arrives, defeats the crocodile king, and rescues the sisters, who later become his wives. Although Chalawan was a villain in the series, Thitiwat’s portrayal received widespread praise. Viewers admired his performance, and he gained new fans, with many affectionately referring to him as “Chalawan” in online spaces and everyday conversation—demonstrating how the character left a lasting impact despite being an antagonist.

On November 26, 2024, Thitiwat was announced as part of the main cast of My Romance Scammer, alongside Panachai Sriariyarungruang (Junior) and Jiruntanin Trairattanayon (Mark). He was initially announced to be paired with Jeeratch Wongpian for the series. On August 19, 2025, it was officially confirmed that Poon Mitpakdee would replace Jeeratch in the main role and become Thitiwat’s on-screen partner. The series later aired on February 1, 2026, marking the pair’s first on-screen project together following the casting announcement.

== Filmography ==
=== Television ===
Key
†	Denotes television productions that have not yet been released

Year	Title	Role	Channel	Notes
2017	Jai Luang	—N/a	Channel 8	Supporting role
2019	Dong Poo Dee	Rum Pichairanarong	Channel 8	Supporting role
2019	Leh Runjuan	Athip	Channel 8	Supporting role
2019	Until We Meet Again	"Dean" Ratthanon Wongnate	LINE TV	Main role
2020	Love, Lie, Haunt The Series: The Haunted Corpse	Tak	Channel 8	Supporting role
2020	Poot Ratikarn	Pha Mueang	Channel 8	Supporting role
2020	Romantic Blue	Mai	Channel 8	Main role
2020	Saneha Stories 3: Saneha Maya	Pete	TV Thunder	Main role
2021	Close Friend Season 1	Pierce	Viu	Main role
2022	Buang Bai Bun	Eku	Channel 8	Supporting role
2022	Close Friend Season 2	Pierce	Viu	Main role
2022	Oh! My Sunshine Night	"Kim" Kimhant Kannakool	AIS Play	Main role
2022	Between Us	"Dean" Ratthanon Wongnate	One31	Supporting role
2022	609 Bedtime Story	Mum	WeTV	Main role
2023	Bake Me Please	Shin	Channel 8	Main role
2024	Lustful Phantom	Inchaweng	Channel 8	Main role
2024	Love of the Two Realms	Chalawan	Channel 8	Main role
2024	Quarantine	Jon	Thai PBS	Main role
2024	Perfect 10 Liners	Tor	GMM 25	Guest role
2025	The Ex-Morning	Paul	GMM 25	Guest role
2026	My Romance Scammer	"Yu" Itsara Preechajit	GMM 25	Main role
TBA	High & Low: Born to Be High †	Whin	TBA	Supporting role
TBA	Vamp Eternal Destiny †	TBA	TBA	TBA

=== Film ===
Year	Title	Role	Note
2023	Step Up To Runway	Marwin	Main role

== Discography ==
=== Singles ===
==== As lead artist ====
Year	Title	Ref.
2021	"พื้นที่เสี่ยง"	

==== Collaborations ====
Year	Title	Artist	Ref.
2021	"ยืนหนึ่ง"	PMCปู่จ๋าน ลองไมค์ x Ohm Fluke	
2022	"ถ้าเธอคิดเหมือนกัน" (feat. Jorin 4EVE & Ohm Thitiwat)	No One Else	
2022	"Falling For You"	Ohm Fluke	

==== Soundtrack appearances ====
Year	Title	Album	Notes	Ref.
2019	"โชคดีแค่ไหน" (with the cast of Until We Meet Again)	Until We Meet Again OST		
2020	"เราจะกลับมาพบกันเสมอ" (with Fluke Natouch)	Until We Meet Again OST		
2020	"บอกรักในใจ"	Poot Ratikarn OST		
2020	"โลกทั้งใบให้นายคนเดียว2020"	Romantic Blue OST		
2022	"อีกนานมั้ย (How Long)" (with Fluke, Kimmon, Copter)	Close Friend โคตรแฟน 2 OST		
2022	"609"	609 Bedtime Story OST	Acoustic + Special version	
2026	"รักหลอก (Love or Lie)" (with Poon Mitpakdee)	My Romance Scammer OST		

== Awards and nominations ==
Year	Awards	Category	Nominated work	Result	Ref.
2021	Fever Awards 2020	Couple of the Year	with Natouch Siripongthon	Won	
2021	Fever Awards 2020	Super Fever Awards	—N/a	Won	
2021	2021 Line TV Awards	Best Dramatic Scene	Until We Meet Again	Nominated	
2021	2021 Line TV Awards	Best Kiss Scene	Until We Meet Again	Nominated	
2021	2021 Line TV Awards	Best Couple	Until We Meet Again (with Natouch Siripongthon)	Nominated	
2021	Siam Series Awards 2021	Imaginary Couple	with Natouch Siripongthon	Won	
2022	Fever Awards 2021	Favorite Series	Romantic Blue	Won	
2022	Fever Awards 2021	Imaginary Couple	with Natouch Siripongthon	Won	
2022	Star Media 2022	International Awards	—N/a	Won	
2023	Asia Top Awards 2023	Best Actor	—N/a	Won	
