= Rathavit Kijworalak =

Thai actor (born 1997)

- รัฐวิทย์ กิจวรลักษณ์
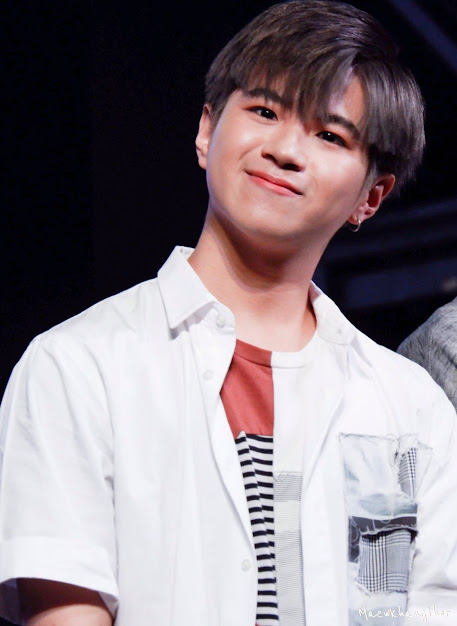
- Born: 19 February 1997 (age 28); Bangkok, Thailand
- Other names: Plan, Pen
- Occupation: Actor
- Years active: 2016–present
- Notable work: Cantaloupe in Love by Chance
- Height: 177 cm (5 ft 9 1/2 in)

Rathavit Kijworalak (Thai: รัฐวิทย์ กิจวรลักษณ์; born 19 February 1997), nicknamed Plan (Thai: แปลน), is a Thai actor. He began his acting career as at age of 19 in the 2016 Thai TV series Make It Right. He is best known for his role as Can or Cantaloupe in the 2018 Thai TV Series Love by Chance.

== Early life & education ==
Rathavit was born on in Thailand. He graduated from Demonstration School of Suan Sunandha Rajabhat University and he went to Dusit Thani College, majoring in Service Innovation in Tourism and Hotel Business. He currently suspended his studies to focus on his acting career.

== Career ==
He was suggested to cast in the Thai TV series Make It Right by Copy A Bangkok in 2016, he played the role of Wit. In 2018, he became well known for his role as Can or Cantaloupe, his character in a BL TV series, “ Love By Chance “ that was aired on GMM 25 and on Line TV. In 2020, he reprised his role as Can in Love by Chance 2: A Chance to Love alongside his on-screen partner, Phiravich Attachitsataporn (Mean)

In May 2020, he signed on as an actor of TV Thunder.

== Filmography ==
=== Television Drama ===
Year	Title	Role	Remark
2019	Kao Waan Hai Noo Pen Sai Lub 2019		Invited

=== Television series ===
Year	Title	Role	Note
2016	Make It Right: The Series	Wit	Supporting
2016	War of High School	Petch / Petchy	Supporting
2017	Make It Right: The Series season 2	Wit	Main
2018	Love by Chance	"Can" Cantaloupe Kirakorn	Main
2019	Reminders	Wish	Main
2019	2Wish	Wish	Main
2019	Make It Live: On The Beach	Wit	Guest
2019	Kao Waan Hai Noo Pen Sai Lub	Young Chuchai	Guest
2019	Until We Meet Again	Student	Guest
2020	Love by Chance 2: A Chance to Love	Cantaloupe "Can" Kirakorn	Main
2021	From Zero To Hero	Ten	Main
2021	7 Project-Breakup Zone	Ryu	Main
2022	Junk Mail	Gene	Main
2022	Why You… Y Me?	Maipai	Support Role
2023	Escape to Homestay	Film	Main
2023	นางฟ้าไร้นาม	Lieutenant Nikorn	Support Role

=== Movies ===
Year	Title	Role	Note
2022	Pee Nak 3 (พี่นาค 3)		Guest
2024	Pee Nak 4 (พี่นาค 4)		Main Role

=== Music video ===
Year	Tiltle	Remark
2018	กระแสน้ำตา (Flow of Tear)	Song by Kulamas Limpawutivaranon
2019	ใช่...ใช่ไหม (Tell Me Is This Love)	with TEMPT (band)
2019	เป็นอะไรสักอย่าง	2wish
2020	Be With Me Tonight	with TEMPT (band)
2020	เจ้าความรัก (My Love)	with Jump Pisitponjangan
2021	พัก (Pause)	with Sammy Samantha
2021	เลิกเก่ง (Loser)	ost. 7 Project
2021	ยาหม่อง (ITCHY)	KANGSOMKS ft. RachYO, Plan Rathavit
2023	เปิดห้องรอแล้วนะ	Song by Grand Kornpassorn

=== Other works ===
Year	Title	Remark
2018–present	Try It TH	Attractor YouTube Channel

== Accolades ==
Year	Award	Category
2020	KAZZ Awards	Cute Boy of the Year
2020	KAZZ Awards	Popular Male Teenage Award
