= Cherry Magic =

Cherry Magic may refers to:

- Cherry Magic! Thirty Years of Virginity Can Make You a Wizard?!, a Japanese manga series by Yuu Toyota
  - Cherry Magic (Thai TV series), a live action adaptation of the manga
