= My Romance =

My Romance may refer to:

- "My Romance" (song), a 1935 song written by Richard Rodgers and Lorenz Hart
- "My Romance" (musical), 1948
- My Romance (Chris Anderson album), 1983
- My Romance (Carly Simon album), 1990
- My Romance (Houston Person album), 1998

== See also ==
- My Bromance, a 2014 Thai movie
