= Saran Anantasetthakul =

Thai actor and model (born 1998)

- ศรัณญ์ อนันตะเศรษฐกูล
- Born: 22 October 1998 (age 27); Thailand
- Other name: Ton (ต้น)
- Education: Thammasat University (International Relations)
- Occupation: Actor
- Years active: 2021–present
- Agent: Domundi TV (2026–present)
- Height: 1.82 m (6 ft 0 in)

Saran Anantasetthakul (Thai: ศรัณญ์ อนันตะเศรษฐกูล; born 22 October 1998), nicknamed Ton (Thai: ต้น), is a Thai actor. He made his acting debut in 2021 in the BL series Y-Destiny, which aired on AIS Play. In 2022, he starred in the BL series Unforgotten Night alongside Phusanu Wongsavanischakorn (Yoon), which aired on GMM 25. He also appeared in Dinosaur Love (2023), Fourever You (2024) on One 31 and RunAway (2025).

== Early life and education ==
Saran was born in Thailand. He attended Hat Yai Wittayalai School in Songkhla province for high school. He was an exchange student in the United States for 10 months, studying at Waterford Mott High School in Michigan. He also volunteered teaching children in Anhui province, China, for a month and a half.

Saran graduated with a degree in International Relations (BIR) from the Faculty of Political Science at Thammasat University. During university, he was elected "Political Science Faculty Moon" and "Thammasat University Moon" in 2018.

== Career ==
Saran made his acting debut in 2021 in the BL series Y-Destiny on AIS Play.

In 2022, he played Kim in the BL series Unforgotten Night on GMM 25, alongside Phusanu Wongsavanischakorn (Yoon). The series was based on an online novel that had accumulated over 15.9 million views. In 2023, he appeared in the series Dinosaur Love on Amarin TV. In 2025, he played Jompol in the series RunAway.

In 2026, he announced that he had joined Thai television production company and talent agency Domundi TV as one of their artists.

== Filmography ==
=== Television series ===
| Year | Title | Role | Notes | Ref. |
|---|---|---|---|---|
| 2021 | Y-Destiny | Choke | Main role | |
| 2022 | Unforgotten Night | Kim | Main role | |
| 2023 | Dinosaur Love | Ton | Guest role | |
| 2024 | Fourever You | Day | Guest role (Ep. 8) | |
| 2025 | RunAway | Jompol Narankankul | Supporting role | |
| 2026 | Mr. Fanboy | Himself | Guest role (Ep. 1) | |

=== Film ===
| Year | Title | Notes |
|---|---|---|
| 2023 | Dinosaur Love: The Movie | Guest role |

== Public events ==
| Year | Title | Date | Location | Ref. |
|---|---|---|---|---|
| 2022 | Birthday Fan Meeting "Chef Ton Omakase" | 23 October 2022 | Siam Hall 2, Bangkok, Thailand | |
| 2023 | Yoon & Ton 1st Fan Meeting in Myanmar | 5–6 May 2023 | Wyndham Grand Yangon Hotel, Yangon, Myanmar | |
| 2024 | 1st Fancon "A NIGHT OF SECRET UNBOX" | 23 October 2024 | EmSphere Hall, Bangkok, Thailand | |

== Awards and nominations ==
| Year | Award | Category | Work | Result | Ref. |
|---|---|---|---|---|---|
| 2022 | Y Universe Awards | Best Leading Role | Yoon Phusanu and Ton Saran (Unforgotten Night) | Nominated | |
| 2023 | Kom Chad Luek Awards | Most Popular Y Couple (Popular Vote) | Yoon Phusanu and Ton Saran (Unforgotten Night) | Nominated | |
