= Perfect 10 Liners =

2024–25 Thai television series

- Official series poster
- Thai: สายรหัสเทวดา
- Genre: Romantic drama; Boys' Love
- Based on: Engineer Cute Boy by JittiRain
- Screenplay by: Inthira Thanasarnsumrit
- Directed by: Siwaj Sawatmaneekul
- Starring: Jiratchapong Srisang; Kasidet Plookphol; Tanapon Sukumpantanasan; Pongsapak Udompoch; Panachai Sriariyarungruang; Jiruntanin Trairattanayon
- Opening theme: "(วันนี้) Perfect" by Force Jiratchapong, Book Kasidet, Perth Tanapon, Santa Pongsapak, Junior Panachai and Mark Jiruntanin
- Composers: Panoth Khunprasert; Tanatat Chaiyaat
- Country of origin: Thailand
- Original language: Thai
- No. of episodes: 24

Production
- Executive producers: Sataporn Panichraksapong; Darapa Choeysanguan
- Producers: Nuttapong Mongkolsawas; Supaporn Lertthitiverakarn
- Cinematography: Saran Jantharakkha; Chonticha Suttiphaet
- Running time: 45 - 60 minutes
- Production companies: GMMTV; Studio Wabi Sabi

Original release
- Network: GMM 25; YouTube
- Release: October 27, 2024 – April 6, 2025

Perfect 10 Liners (Thai: สายรหัสเทวดา) is a 2024 Thai television series, starring Jiratchapong Srisang (Force), Kasidet Plookphol (Book), Tanapon Sukumpantanasan (Perth), Pongsapak Udompoch (Santa), Panachai Sriariyarungruang (Junior) and Jiruntanin Trairattanayon (Mark). The series premiered on the GMM 25 channel and GMMTV's YouTube on October 27, 2024.

The series follows six university students, three couples, with each couple having a separate arc in the series. The first arc is led by Arm (Kasidet Plookphol) and Arc (Jiratchapong Srisang), the second arc is led by Yotha (Tanapon Sukumpantanasan) and Gun (Pongsapak Udompoch), and the third and final arc is led by Faifa (Panachai Sriariyarungruang) and Wine (Jiruntanin Trairattanayon).

== Cast and characters ==
=== Main ===
- Jiratchapong Srisang (Force) as Anol Paraminphisan (Arc)
- Kasidet Plookphol (Book) as Anon Phuwakomol (Arm)
- Tanapon Sukumpantanasan (Perth) as Yotha Thanawanyotha (Yotha/Yo)
- Pongsapak Udompoch (Santa) as Gunyukhol Jiraroj (Gun)
- Panachai Sriariyarungruang (Junior) as Faifa Thanawanyotha (Faifa/Fa)
- Jiruntanin Trairattanayon (Mark) as Witsawa (Wine), formerly Warat Oon-arun

=== Supporting ===
- Natarit Worakornlertsith (Marc) as Pond (Arc's friend)
- Poon Mitpakdee as Sand (Arm's friend)
- Thasorn Klinnium (Emi) as Yeepun / Pun (Arm's peer mentor)
- Jeeratch Wongpian (Fluke) as Jet (Yeepun's boyfriend and Arc's peer mentor)
- Gawin Caskey as Warm (Arc's friend)
- Sattabut Laedeke (Drake) as Copp (Arc's friend)
- Chayakorn Jutamas (JJ) as Pipo / Po (Arm's friend)
- Preeyaphat Lawsuwansiri (Earn) as Arisara Methasiri (A-ngun)
- Napat Patcharachavalit (Aun) as Kong (Gun's friend)
- Ochiris Suwanacheep (Aungpao) as Franc (Gun's friend)
- Allan Asawasuebsakul (Ford) as Book (Gun's friend)
- Thanawin Teeraphosukarn (Louis) as Phuri (Faifa's friend)
- Naruth Prateeppravameta (Franc) as Jay (Wine's friend)
- Teeradech Vitheepanich (Tee) as Ben (Wine's friend)
- Kirati Puangmalee (Title) as Sam
- Thanaboon Kiatniran (Aou) as Klao
- Tharatorn Jantharaworakarn (Boom) as Warich (Klao's boyfriend and Yotha's ex)
- Patsit Permpoonsavat (Soodyacht) as Nop
- Phanuroj Chalermkijporntavee (Pepper) as Newton / Ton (Bar owner)
- Juthapich Indrajundra (Jamie) as Kloi (Gun's older sister)

=== Guest ===
- Tawan Vihokratana (Tay) as Tawan (Ep. 5, 14, 23)
- Kanyarat Ruangrung (Piploy) as Brink (Ep. 6–8)
- Tawinan Anukoolprasert (Sea) as Thongfah (Ep. 6–8)
- Kochakorn Nimakorn (Ngor) (Ep. 9, 11, 14–16)
- Pijika Jittaputta (Lookwa) as Yotha and Faifa's mother (Ep. 12–13, 16, 21–23)
- Attaporn Teemarkorn (Noom) as Yotha and Faifa's father (Ep. 12, 14, 16, 18, 23)
- Pisith Nimitsamanjit (Fluk) as Kim (Uncredited) (Ep. 17)
- Phatchatorn Thanawat (Ployphach) as Toey (Wine's ex) (Ep. 18–19, 22)
- Thitiwat Ritprasert (Ohm) as Tor (Ep. 22–23)

== Original soundtrack ==
The official soundtrack for Perfect 10 Liners features:

Song	Artist(s)	Label	Ref.
"(วันนี้) Perfect"	Force Jiratchapong, Book Kasidet, Perth Tanapon, Santa Pongsapak, Junior Panachai and Mark Jiruntanin	GMMTV Records	
"(ผู้ร้ายปากแข็ง) Love Suspect"	Force Jiratchapong and Book Kasidet	GMMTV Records	
"(แค่เธอเท่านั้น) No One Else"	Perth Tanapon and Santa Pongsapak	GMMTV Records	
"(ทดลองรัก) Trial love"	Junior Panachai and Mark Jiruntanin	GMMTV Records	

== Awards and nominations ==
Year	Award	Category	Result	Ref
2024	Thailand Y Content Awards 2024	Best Series	Won	
