= Natouch Siripongthon =

Thai actor (born 1996)

- ณธัช ศิริพงษ์ธร
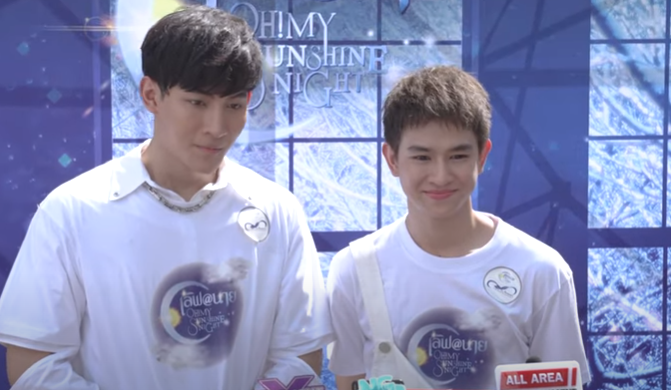
- Fluke (right) and Ohm Thitiwat in November 2021
- Born: 1 June 1996 (age 30); Lamphun, Thailand
- Other name: Fluke (ฟลุ้ค)
- Education: Faculty of Arts, Dhurakij Pundit University
- Occupations: Actor; YouTuber
- Years active: 2013–present
- Notable work: Grean Fictions; My Bromance; Until We Meet Again
- Height: 170 cm (5 ft 7 in)

Natouch Siripongthon (Thai: ณธัช ศิริพงษ์ธร, RTGS: Nathat Siriphongthon; born 1 June 1996), nicknamed Fluke, is a Thai actor. He is best known for his roles in Grean Fictions (2013), My Bromance (2014), and Until We Meet Again (2019).

== Early life and education ==
Natouch Siripongthon was born on 1 June 1996. He graduated from Dhurakij Pundit University with a bachelor's degree in the Faculty of Arts. He is currently studying for a master's degree at Chulalongkorn University. He is openly gay.

== Career ==
His first major film was Grean Fictions, released in 2013 and shot in Chiang Mai—the film was cast with young actors of the region. He was noted for his performance in Grean Fictions, which landed him the starring role in the film My Bromance in 2014, where he plays a young man who falls in love with his new stepfather's son. With the positive reception of the film, Fluke became one of the young Thai actors better known abroad. In 2015, Fluke starred in Tanwarin Sukkhapisit's film Red Wine in the Dark Night as an innocent young man who encounters an amnesiac vampire.

He performed as Pharm in Until We Meet Again, released in 2019, where he plays a reborn man who committed suicide together with his male lover due to love rejection from his lover's parents. This is based on the book, The Red Thread by Lazy Sheep.

== Filmography ==
=== Film ===
Year	Title	Role	Notes
2013	Grean Fictions	Pang	Supporting role
2013	3 A.M. Part 2	Kamod	Supporting role
2014	My Bromance	Bank	Main role
2014	Change	Champ	Main role
2015	Feel Good	NewNew	Main role
2015	Red Wine in the Dark Night	Wine	Main role
2015	Ghost Ship	Yorla	Main role
2020	My Bromance: 5 Years Later	Bank	Main role
TBA	Thesis	Nawa	Main role

=== Television series ===
Year	Title	Role	Network	Notes	Ref.
2015	Nong Mai Rai Borisut	Fong	Channel 3	Guest role	
2015	LOL	Chacha	True4U	Supporting role	
2015	Crazy Love	—N/a	—N/a	Main role	
2015	Part of Love	Ayang	Channel 9	Main role	
2017	Sai Lub Jub Abb	Yibun (Plar's student)	Channel 3	Supporting role	
2019	Wai Sab Saraek Kad 2	Anne	Channel 3	Supporting role	
2019	Until We Meet Again	Pharm	Line TV	Main role	
2019	Blacklist	Nattee	GMMTV	Guest role	
2020	Daughters	Yok	PPTV	Main role	
2020	Poot Ratikarn	Namnuea	Channel 8	Supporting role	
2021	Close Friend Season 1	Typhoon (Ep.1)	Viu	Main role	
2022	Close Friend Season 2	Typhoon	Viu	Main role	
2022	Oh! My Sunshine Night	"Sun" / Tawan Theekhakorn	AIS Play	Main role	
2022	Between Us	Pharm	iQIYI	Supporting role	
2022	609 Bedtime Story	Dew	WeTV	Main role	
2023	Boyband The Series	Himself	GMM 25	Guest role	
2023	Make a Wish	Angel Krit	Viu	Main role	
2023	Shadow	Nine	Viu	Main role	
2026	Your Third	Pimai	GMM 25	Supporting role	

== Discography ==
Year	Title	Notes	Ref.
2019	"โชคดีแค่ไหน"	With the cast of Until We Meet Again	
2020	"เราจะกลับมาพบกันเสมอ"	With Thitiwat Ritprasert; Until We Meet Again (TV series) OST.	
2020	"เก็บ (Hidden)"		
2021	"ยืนหนึ่ง"	With PMCปู่จ๋าน ลองไมค์ X Thitiwat Ritprasert	
2022	"อีกนานมั้ย (How Long)"	With Thitiwat Ritprasert, Warodom Khemmonta, & Panuwat Kerdthongtavee; Close Friend โคตรแฟน 2 OST	
2022	"Failing For You"	With Thitiwat Ritprasert + English Version	
2023	"เจ้าชายนิทรา (Sleeping Prince)"	Boyband The Series OST	
2023	"Make a Wish"	Make A Wish OST	

== Awards and nominations ==
Year	Award	Category	Nominated work	Result	Ref.
2021	Fever Awards 2020	Couple of the Year (with Thitiwat Ritprasert)	—N/a	Won	
2021	2021 Line TV Awards	Best Dramatic Scene	Until We Meet Again	Nominated	
2021	2021 Line TV Awards	Best Kiss Scene	Until We Meet Again	Nominated	
2021	2021 Line TV Awards	Best Couple (with Thitiwat Ritprasert)	Until We Meet Again	Nominated	
2021	Siam Series Awards 2021	Imaginary Couple (with Thitiwat Ritprasert)	—N/a	Won	
2022	Fever Awards 2021	Imaginary Couple (with Thitiwat Ritprasert)	—N/a	Won	
