= Terror Tuesday: Extreme =

2024 Thai horror anthology television series

- Thai: อังคารคลุมโปง: เอ็กซ์ตรีม
- Genre: Horror; Anthology
- Written by: Chayan Laoyodtrakool; Prueksa Amaruji; Abhichoke Chandrasen; Pun Homchuen; Prin Keeratiratanalak; Kanokphan Ornrattanasakul; Chukiat Sakveerakul; Kasidej Sundararjun; Eakasit Thairatana; Thanamas Thalerngsuk
- Directed by: Prueksa Amaruji; Abhichoke Chandrasen; Prin Keeratiratanalak; Alisa Pien; Chayan Laoyodtrakool; Surapong Ploensang; Chukiat Sakveerakul; Eakasit Thairatana
- Starring: See below
- Music by: Terdsak Janpan
- Country of origin: Thailand
- Original language: Thai
- No. of episodes: 8

Production
- Cinematography: Kritsada Nakagate; Wara Pornkulwat; Anupong Posuwan; T-Thawat Taifayongvichit
- Editors: Wachrakorn Thaweesab; Nisarat Meechok; Asamapon Samakphan
- Camera setup: Multi-camera
- Running time: 38–46 min
- Production companies: ATIME Media; Brandthink Cinema

Original release
- Network: Netflix
- Release: August 20, 2024

Terror Tuesday: Extreme (Thai: อังคารคลุมโปง: เอ็กซ์ตรีม) is a Thai horror anthology television series. Produced by ATIME Media and Brandthink Cinema, and stars Nat Kitcharit, Charada Imraporn, and Sutthirak Subvijitra. The series premiered on Netflix on August 20, 2024.

== Cast ==
- Nat Kitcharit
- Charada Imraporn
- Sutthirak Subvijitra
- Parada Thitawachira
- Pattaravadee Boonmeesup
- Cherprang Areekul
- Praewa Suthamphong
- Duangporn Sonthikhun
- Laphasrada Chuaykua
- Vorarit Fuangarom
- Narupornkamol Chaisang
- Poon Mitpakdee
- Panisara Rikulsurakan
- Sakuntala Thianphairot
- Chayanit Chansangavej
- Cholawit Meetongcom
- Namthip Jongrachatawiboon
- Supitcha Sungkajinda
- Kachapa Toncharoen
- Yarinda Bunnag
- Phumphat Chartsuriyakiat
- Sirani Yankittikan
- Paramej Noiam
- Dhanyabhorn Sondhikandha
- Ongart Cheamcharoenpornkul
- Autthaphol Thetthawong
- Prince Tanatchanon
- Vasana Chalakorn
- Neeranuch Pattamasoot
- Jarupus Pattamasiri
- Surapol Poonpiriya

== Production ==
In February 2024, the series was announced on Netflix. Principal photography of the series commenced in Bangkok, Thailand. On 22 July, the trailer of the series was released.

== Reception ==
Upon release the series emerged as the most watched Netflix series in Indonesia. On the review aggregator website Rotten Tomatoes, 80% of 5 critics' reviews are positive, with an average rating of 6.3/10. Jenny Nixon of Common Sense Media a score of 2 stars out of 5. Joel Keller of Decider reviewed the series.
