= Poon Mitpakdee =

Thai actor and singer (born 1999)

- ปูน มิตรภักดี
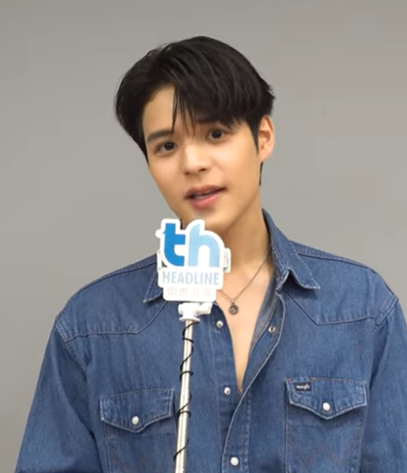
- Poon in March 2025
- Born: 4 December 1999 (age 26); Phanom Thuan District, Kanchanaburi Province, Thailand
- Other name: Pun Mitphakdi
- Education: Thammasat University
- Occupations: Actor; Singer
- Years active: 2020–present
- Agent: GMMTV
- Known for: Pun in We Are; Sand in Perfect 10 Liners; North in My Romance Scammer
- Height: 177 cm (5 ft 8 in)
- Website: GMMTV Artists

Poon Mitpakdee (Thai: ปูน มิตรภักดี; born 4 December 1999) is a Thai actor and singer. He is best known for his roles in Perfect 10 Liners (2024), We Are (2024) and My Romance Scammer (2026).

== Early life and education ==
Poon was born in Phanom Thuan District, Kanchanaburi Province, Thailand. He graduated from Thammasat University with a bachelor's degree in the Faculty of Journalism and Mass Communication, Majoring in Radio & Television.

== Career ==
Poon was invited to join GMMTV by producer and senior director of content production Noppharnach Chaiyahwimhon. Poon secured his breakthrough role due to the legal proceedings surrounding actor Thanik Kamontharanon (Pawin) at the time of filming the TV series We Are and subsequently the role of Pun was recast as Poon. Due to the termination of Poon's acting partnership with Natarit Worakornlertsith (Marc), he obtained the role of North in the television series My Romance Scammer after replacing Jeeratch Wongpian (Fluke). He is also the owner of the clothing brand flup.bkk.

== Filmography ==
=== Film ===
Year	Title	Role	Notes	Distributed by
2021	The Medium	Mac	Support role	GDH 559 (Thailand); Showbox (South Korea)
2023	Not Friends	Thanon	Guest role	GDH 559
2025	Happy Monday(s)	Tae	Support role	Abnormal Studios

=== Television series ===
Key
†	Denotes television productions that have not yet been released

Year	Title	Role	Notes	Network	Ref.
2019	Theory of Love	Ko (Two's friend)	Uncredited	GMM25	
2020	Bad Genius	—N/a	Uncredited	One31	
2022	Our Days	Pond	Support role	One31	
2023	Don't Touch My Gang	Roll	Support role	WeTV	
2023	Shadow	Josh	Support role	Viu	
2024	1000 Years Old	Chalui	Support role	Channel 3	
2024	We Are	Pun	Main role	GMM25	
2024	The Trainee	"Pah" Pramote Boonkoet	Support role	GMM25	
2024	Terror Tuesday: Extreme (Ep 3: Ode to My Family)	Chawin	Main role	Netflix	
2024	Perfect 10 Liners	Sand	Support role	GMM25	
2025	Dalah: Death and the Flowers	Ekasit (young)	Guest role	Netflix	
2025	Sweet Tooth, Good Dentist	Gugg	Support role	GMM25	
2025	The Dark Dice	Benz	Support role	GMM25	
2026	Missing	Win	Main role	TrueAsian More	
2026	My Romance Scammer	"North" Nipitpon Jiramongkolthanun	Main role	GMM25	
2026	Pha Jaan: The Roommate †	TBA	Main role	YouTube	
TBA	Plan B to U †	TBA	Support role	TBA	
TBA	Vamp Eternal Destiny †	TBA	Support role	TBA	

=== Appearances in music videos ===
Year	Title	Artist(s)	Label	Ref.
2019	"ทุกลมหายใจ"	Tor Ponnakod	Genie Records	
2020	"ฤดู (Cycle of Love)"	Dept	SMALLROOM BANGKOK	
2020	"เก็บ (Ctrl+S)"	Pray	Independent Artist	
2021	"ถึงเวลาฟัง (hear(t))"	mints	What The Duck	
2021	"บานปลาย (best wishes)"	BOWKYLION	What The Duck	
2021	"พอดี"	COCKTAIL	Gene Lab	
2022	"กลัวเธอจะไม่รู้ (Inbox)"	WHITE YOU	Independent Artist	
2022	"เรื่องของใจ"	Zee	Sanamluang Music	
2022	"มันจะไม่มีอีกครั้ง"	The White Hair Cut	Genie Records	
2022	"MUSIC FEST (มิวสิค เฟส)"	BOWPRAT	WYNN Entertainment	
2023	"เขาไม่ชอบเธอหรอก (Pick Me)"	PRMRYPIE x Txrbo	High Cloud Entertainment	
2023	"โรคคลั่งรัก (Loveholic)"	Mercury Goldfish	ChaseMusicTH	
2023	"ยอมแพ้ (Enough)"	Mercury Goldfish	ChaseMusicTH	
2023	"แค่มองตา"	KWANG ABnormal	Genie Records	
2023	"บอกลาไม่ลง (Can't Say Goodbye)"	Pol Nopwichai	Independent Artist	
2023	"หมอนช้าง"	LUSS	XOXO Entertainment	
2023	"ฤดูหนาว"	PARADOX feat.LHAN	Genie Records	
2024	"นานตลอดกาล (We Are Forever)"; We Are OST	Phuwin Tangsakyuen	GMMTV Records	
2024	"ฝึกรัก (LOVE TRAINING)"; The Trainee OST	Gun Atthaphan	GMMTV Records	
2024	"มากกว่า"	FrenchW	Tero Music	
2025	"จันทร์สะท้อนใจ (Mirror Moon)"	Kamin Kingsak	Independent Artist	

== Discography ==
=== Singles ===
==== Soundtracks ====
Year	Title	Soundtrack	Label	Ref.
2024	"เรามีเรา (WE ARE)" with Pond, Phuwin, Winny, Satang, Aou, Boom, Marc	We Are OST	GMMTV Records	
2024	"แอบเพื่อน (Hidden Love)" with Marc Natarit	We Are OST	GMMTV Records	
2026	"รักหลอก (Love or Lie)" with Ohm Thitiwat	My Romance Scammer OST	GMMTV Records	

== Fan meetings ==
Title	Date	Venue	Notes	Ref.
The Trainee Final EP. Fan Meeting	September 15, 2024	Siam Pavalai Royal Grand Theater, Siam Paragon	With The Trainee Cast	
We Are FOREVER Fan Meeting in Tokyo	October 17–18, 2024	Tachikawa Stage Garden	With We Are Cast	
We Are FOREVER Fan Meeting in Hong Kong	October 20, 2024	The Londoner, Macau	With We Are Cast	
We Are FOREVER Fan Meeting in Taipei	November 2, 2024	Legacy TERA	With We Are Cast	
Sweet Tooth, Good Dentist Final EP. Fan Meeting	June 6, 2025	SF World Cinema, CentralWorld	With Sweet Tooth, Good Dentist Cast	
Naiin Book Fair 2026	January 31, 2026	Samyan Mitrtown, 5th Fl.	With Ohm	
My Romance Scammer: Love at First Scam	February 1, 2026	6th Fl. Siam Paragon - Siam Pavalai, Paragon Cineplex	With My Romance Scammer Cast	
GMMTV Fanival 2026	March 20, 2026	CentralWorld Pulse, 7th Fl.	With Ohm	
My Romance Scammer Final EP. Fan Meeting	April 19, 2026	MCC Hall, floor 3, The Mall Lifestore Bangkae	With My Romance Scammer Cast	
WeTV x My Romance Scammer	April 29, 2026	Union Mall, Union Co-Event Studio, 5th Fl.	With My Romance Scammer Cast	
GMMTV International Novel Festival 2026	July 26, 2026	Samyan Mitrtown, 5th Fl.	With Ohm	
GMMTV Fanival: Happy Family	October 8, 2026	Union Hall, Union Mall	With Ohm	

== Concerts ==
Title	Date	Venue	Artist(s)	Ref.
We Are FOREVER Fancon	August 16–17, 2024	True Icon Hall, Iconsiam	With Pond, Phuwin, Winny, Satang, Aou, Boom, Marc, Pepper, Tee, JJ	
We Are FOREVER Fancon in Vietnam	September 14, 2024	Hoa Binh Theater	With Pond, Phuwin, Winny, Satang, Aou, Boom, Marc	
GMMTV Starlympics 2024	December 21, 2024	Impact Arena, Muang Thong Thani	GMMTV Artists	
JossGawin Invincible Fancon	September 27, 2025	MCC Hall, The Mall Lifestore Bangkapi	With Joss, Gawin, Barcode, Neo, Mond, Ryu, Satang, Ford	
GMMTV Starlympics 2025	December 20, 2025	Impact Arena, Muang Thong Thani	GMMTV Artists	
JuniorMark Sunny Moon Concert	August 7, 2026	Bitec Live	With Junior, Mark, Aun, Save, Leo	
