= Kirati Puangmalee =

Thai actor, model and singer (born 1998)

- กีรติ พวงมาลี
- Born: 26 March 1998 (age 28); Thailand
- Other name: Title (ไตเติ้ล)
- Education: University of the Thai Chamber of Commerce (Bachelor of Aviation Business)
- Occupations: Actor; model; singer
- Years active: 2017–present
- Agent: GMMTV
- Height: 182 cm (6 ft 0 in)

Kirati Puangmalee (Thai: กีรติ พวงมาลี; born 26 March 1998), known by his nickname Title (Thai: ไตเติ้ล), is a Thai actor, model and singer under GMMTV. He is known for his roles in Love by Chance (2018), Until We Meet Again (2019), We Are (2024), Kidnap (2024), Pluto (2024), and Perfect 10 Liners (2024). He was the lead vocalist of the musical project TEMPT.

== Early life and education ==
Kirati was born on 26 March 1998 in Thailand. He is 182 cm tall and weighs 70 kg. He earned a bachelor's degree in Aviation Business from the University of the Thai Chamber of Commerce (UTCC).

== Career ==
Title made his acting debut in 2017 as Guide in the short film Let Me Kiss You. His first major television role came in 2018 as Tum in the series Love by Chance.

Title was also the lead vocalist of the musical group TEMPT, formed in 2019. The group released their debut single, "Tell Me This is Love", on 24 July 2019.

== Filmography ==
=== Television ===
Year	Title	Role	Notes	Network	Ref.
2018	Love by Chance	Tum	Main role	GMM 25	
2019	Until We Meet Again	Krit Ariyasakul (young)	Supporting role	Line TV	
2020	Love by Chance 2: A Chance to Love	Tum	Main role	GMM 25	
2020	You Never Eat Alone	Bod	Guest role	AIS Play	
2022	Saneha Stories 4: Saneha Aep Son	Zen	Supporting role	Channel 3	
2022	Unforgotten Night	Karan	Guest role	GMM 25	
2023	Matalada	Min	Supporting role	Channel 3	
2023	Be My Favorite	Knot	Supporting role	GMM 25	
2023	Only Friends	Atom	Supporting role	GMM 25	
2024	We Are	Kluen	Supporting role	GMM 25	
2024	Pluto	Ben	Supporting role	GMM 25	
2024	Kidnap	James	Supporting role	GMM 25	
2024	Wandee Goodday	Blue	Guest role	GMM 25	
2024	Ploy's Yearbook	—N/a	Guest role	GMM 25	
2024	Perfect 10 Liners	Sam	Supporting role	GMM 25	
2024	Leap Day	Win	Supporting role	GMM 25	
2025	Friendshit Forever	Q	Supporting role	GMM 25	
2025	Break Up Service	Ek	Guest role	GMM 25	
2026	My Romance Scammer	Kuea	Supporting role	GMM 25	
2026	You Maniac	Jo	Supporting role	GMM 25	
2026	Gunshot †	Mao	Supporting role	GMM 25	
TBA	Blue Print †	TBA	Supporting role	TBA	

=== Film ===
Year	Title	Role	Notes	Ref.
2017	Let Me Kiss You	Guide	Short film	
2019	Love: Must Fight	—N/a	Short film	

== Discography ==
=== Solo ===
- 2020: "เพลงเดิม (Same Old Song)" – Love by Chance 2 OST

=== As a member of TEMPT ===
- 2019: "Tell Me This is Love" (debut single)
