= Save Saisawat =

Thai actor (born 1998)

- เซฟ ไซสวัสดิ์
- Save in July 2025
- Born: 9 September 1998 (age 28); Phrae, Mueang Phrae District, Thailand
- Education: Kasetsart University
- Occupation: Actor
- Years active: 2022–present
- Agents: MChoice (2022–2025); GMMTV (2025–present)
- Known for: Chonlathee in Ai Long Nhai; Jay in Eccentric Romance; Ton in My Magic Prophecy
- Height: 1.75 m (5 ft 9 in)

Save Saisawat (Thai: เซฟ ไซสวัสดิ์; born 1998), is a Thai actor known for his roles in Ai Long Nhai (2022), Eccentric Romance (2023) and My Magic Prophecy (2025).

== Early life and education ==
Save was born in Phrae, Mueang Phrae District, Thailand. He graduated from Kasetsart University with a bachelor's degree in social and political sciences.

== Career ==
Save first entered the entertainment industry as a YouTuber alongside Supat Loylawan (G) with their shared channel @saveG. On November 19, 2021, Save was launched as one of the first artists under MChoice Thailand.

In September 2022, Save had his first supporting role in the boys' love series Ai Long Nhai. That same year, he had his first main role in the musical drama series Why You… Y Me?. In 2023, Save landed his second main role in the Korean-Thai collaboration project Eccentric Romance, partnering with Korean actor Yoon Jun Won.

On March 18, 2025, Save signed with GMMTV, being paired with acting partner Naruth Prateeppavameta (Franc) for My Magic Prophecy and the upcoming series Roommate Chaos.

== Filmography ==
=== Film ===
Year	Title	Role	Notes	Ref.
2025	Panyi I See You	Park	Main role	

=== Television series ===
Key
†	Denotes television productions that have not yet been released

Year	Title	Role	Notes	Network	Ref.
2022	Ai Long Nhai	Chonlathee	Supporting role	Channel 3 HD	
2022	Why You… Y Me?	Maito	Main role	WeTV	
2023	To the Moon and Back	—N/a	Guest role	Channel 3 HD	
2024	Eccentric Romance	Jay	Main role	?	
2025	My Magic Prophecy	Ton	Supporting role	GMM 25	
2026	My Romance Scammer	—N/a	Guest role	GMM 25	
2026	Oxytoxin	Dim Laosathitphong	Supporting role	GMM 25	
TBA	Roommate Chaos †	Monthol	Main role	TBA	
TBA	Billionaire Biker †	Wanchana Ajcharangkun	Main role	TBA	

=== Stage ===
Year	Title	Role	Notes	Venue	Ref.
2026	The Love of Siam: The Musical	Mac	Supporting role	Muangthai Rachadalai Theatre, Esplanade Ratchada	

== Discography ==
=== Singles ===
==== Soundtrack appearances ====
Year	Title	Soundtrack	Label	Ref.
2022	"อย่าลืมกันนะ (Dont Forget)" with Evening Sunday	Why You… Y Me? OST	MChoice TH	
2022	"คิดถึงที่ไหน (Where Do You Miss?)" with Evening Sunday	Why You… Y Me? OST	MChoice TH	
2022	"คิดถึงที่ไหน (Where Do You Miss?)" with Evening Sunday (feat. Parn Nachcha)	Why You… Y Me? OST	MChoice TH	
2022	"เพื่อนธรรมดา (Normal Friend)" with Evening Sunday	Why You… Y Me? OST	MChoice TH	

== Fanmeetings ==
Title	Date	Venue	Notes	Ref.
My Magic Prophecy: Let the Magic Begin	July 27, 2025	Siam Pavalai Royal Grand Theatre	With My Magic Prophecy cast	
My Magic Prophecy Lucky in Love Fan Party	September 28, 2025	MCC Hall, The Mall Lifestore Bangkapi	With My Magic Prophecy cast	
My Magic Prophecy Lucky in Love After Party	September 29, 2025	MCC Hall, The Mall Lifestore Bangkapi	With My Magic Prophecy cast	
Naiin Book Fair 2026	January 23, 2026	Samyan Mitrtown, 5th Fl.	With Franc	
GMMTV Fanival 2026	March 27, 2026	CentralWorld Pulse, 7th Fl.	With Franc	
GMMTV International Novel Festival 2026	July 27, 2026	Samyan Mitrtown, 5th Fl.	With Franc	
GMMTV International Novel Festival 2026	July 27, 2026	Samyan Mitrtown, 5th Fl.	With Roommate Chaos Cast	
GMMTV Fanival: Happy Family	October 1, 2026	Union Hall, Union Mall	With Franc	

== Concerts ==
Title	Date	Venue	Notes	Ref.
JuniorMark Sunny Moon Concert	August 7, 2026	BITEC LIVE	With Junior, Mark, Poon, Aun, Leo	
