= Love by Chance =

2018–20 Thai television series

- Promotional poster for season one
- Also known as: My Accidental Love Is You
- Original title: บังเอิญรัก Love By Chance
- Genre: BL
- Based on: My Accidental Love is You รักนี้บังเอิญคือคุณ by MAME12938
- Written by: MAME12938
- Directed by: Siwaj Sawatmaneekul
- Starring: Tanapon Sukumpantanasan; Suppapong Udomkaewkanjana; Phiravich Attachitsataporn; Rathavit Kijworalak; Siwat Jumlongkul; Napat na Ranong; Kirati Puangmalee; Katsamonnat Namwirote
- Opening theme: Wish This Love by Dew Arunpong
- Country of origin: Thailand
- Original language: Thai
- No. of seasons: 2
- No. of episodes: 26

Production
- Producer: Siwaj Sawatmaneekul
- Running time: 50 minutes
- Production companies: Studio Wabi Sabi Co., Ltd. Millennials Choice (season 2)

Original release
- Network: GMM 25; LINE TV
- Release: August 3, 2018 – November 18, 2020

Related
- TharnType; TharnType 2: 7 Years of Love

Love by Chance (Thai: บังเอิญรัก; RTGS: Bang-oen Rak) is a 2018 Thai boys' love drama series based on My Accidental Love Is You รักนี้บังเอิญคือคุณ by MAME12938, a popular novel on website Dek-D.com. It's about the love story of two people who coincidentally met and helped each other, and is directed by Siwaj Sawatmaneekul. The series initially scheduled to air on Channel 9 MCOT HD on May 27, 2018, but the broadcast was suspended a day before initial date. It is finally aired on GMM 25 on August 3, 2018, and re-released on LINE TV, with over 118 million views. The series gained popularity series in East and Southeast Asia, and parts of Europe, North and South America. The second season premiered on September 2, 2020 with a focus on the characters Tin and Can.

== Synopsis ==
=== Season 1 ===
The story of Ae (Tanapon Sukumpantanasan), a freshman from Engineering School and also a member of the college football team, who accidentally helps Pete (Suppapong Udomkaewkanjana), a handsome freshman from International College, from his ex-boyfriend who's blackmailing Pete with a clip that exposes his homosexuality to Pete's mother. Ae helps Pete without expecting anything in return, but he doesn't know Pete's already greatly drawn by his kindness and gentle nature and has begun to develop feelings for him. Unbeknownst to Pete, Ae is also drawn to Pete's innocence and immense kindness. But Pete is wary and knows painfully well that he's different than many other boys due to his sexuality. He feels he would rather keep his feelings hidden than destroy his new friendship with Ae. However, with time and patience their relationship starts to grow and they become closer than either of them could have ever imagined.

=== Season 2 ===
Growing up in a wealthy family, Tin (Phiravich Attachitsataporn) had always enjoyed the privileges that inherently came with wealth. Never denied a thing, he had the world at his fingertips, yet his heart constantly reminded him that there were more important things in life than wealth and privilege. But with people using him as a means to better their own lives, he had little chance to explore the desire of his own heart. Suspicious of anyone who ever tried to get close, Tin had closed his heart off to the world, until the day he met Can (Rathavit Kijworalak). An innocent and rather impressionable young man, Can had never met anyone quite like Tin. An incorruptible soul, Can’s sweetness left an indelible impression on Tin and their friendship blossomed overnight. However, as Tin and Can drew closer, Tin began to realize his feelings for his friend were quickly becoming much stronger than those of simple friendship. Mustering the courage to tell Can how he felt, Tin admitted his feelings for his friend, but Can could not accept them. Heartbroken, Tin must now decide where things go from here. Does he give up on the boy who stole his heart? Or does he hold onto the hope that eventually, true love will conquer all?

== Cast and characters ==
=== Main ===
- Tanapon Sukumpantanasan (Perth) as Ae Intouch
- Suppapong Udomkaewkanjana (Saint) as Pete Pichaya (season 1; flashbacks season 2)
- Phiravich Attachitsataporn (Mean) as Tin Medthanan
- Rathavit Kijworalak (Plan) as Can Kirakorn
- Napat na Ranong (Gun) as Techno
- Siwat Jumlongkul (Mark) as Kengkla
- Kirati Puangmalee (Title) as Tum
- Katsamonnat Namwirote (Earth) as Tar

=== Supporting ===
- Surat Permpoonsawat (Yacht) as Pond
- Nachjaree Horvejkul (Cherreen) as ChaAim
- Pirapat Watthanasetsiri (Earth) as Type
- Phurin Ruangvivatjarus (M) as Trump
- Preya Wongrabeb as Can's Mom
- Apasiri Nitibhon (Um) as Pete's Mom
- Chutima Limcharoenrat as Nat
- Vitthawat Singlampong as Oh
- Vittawin Veeravidhayanant (Best) as Good
- Kris Songsamphant as Technic
- Samantha Melanie Coates as Bow
- Praphatthon Chakkhuchan (James) as Ping
- Channanda Chieovisaman (Ew) as Champ
- Mudchima Pluempitiviriyavaj (Bua) as Chompoo
- Pannin Charnmanoon (Pineare) as Daily
- Praeploy Oree as Lemon
- Thanaboon Wanlopsirinan (Na) as Tul
- Chonrawee Chutiwatkhachonchai as Ae's Mom
- Nichakoon Khajornborirak (Meen) as Tul
- Ravipon Sangaworawong (Est) as Gonhin
- Pisitpon Ekpongpisit (Jump) as Job
- Krittin Sosungnern (Krit) as Mai
- Thapanat Athikompokin (Boss) as Keen

== Soundtrack ==
- Dew Arunpong - "Mai Wah Arai (Wish This Love)" (opening theme)
- Boy Sompob - Kor (Wish)
- Boy Sompob feat. Catchy - "Na Na Na"
- Various Artist - "Sun (Shake)" (Love Sick OST)
- Stamp - "Supermarket"

== Accolades ==
- KoreanUpdates Awards 2018 - Asian Drama of The Year
- KoreanUpdates Awards 2018 - Asian Artist of The Year (Tanapon Sukumpantanasan)
- LINE TV AWARDS 2019 - Best Kiss Scene (Tanapon Sukumpantanasan and Suppapong Udomkaewkanjana)
- LINE TV AWARDS 2019 - Best Couple (Tanapon Sukumpantanasan and Suppapong Udomkaewkanjana)
- KAZZ AWARDS 2019 - Rising Male Star of the Year 2019 (Suppapong Udomkaewkanjana)
