= Break Up Service =

2025 Thai television series

- Official series poster
- Thai: บริษัทลดรักเลิก
- Genre: Comedy; Romance
- Created by: GMMTV; Parbdee Tawesuk
- Based on: Break-Up Service บริษัทรับจ้างทำลายรัก by Komai (กอไหม)
- Screenplay by: Meathus Sirinawin; Kannika Tovaranonte
- Story by: Komai (กอไหม)
- Directed by: Thachai Komolphet; Sasinan Pattana
- Starring: Jumpol Adulkittiporn; Jorin Khumpiraphan
- Opening theme: "So Fly" by Satang Kittiphop feat. Off Jumpol
- Country of origin: Thailand
- Original language: Thai
- No. of episodes: 12

Production
- Executive producers: Darapa Chaysanguan; Sataporn Panichraksapong; Kamthorn Lorjitramnuay
- Producers: Nattapong Mongkolsawat; Supaporn Lertthitiverakarn; Jittaya Chanpoung; Krittanan Deedenkeeratisakul; Benjaphan Rungsubhatanond; Naruchan Sakunjan; Pinyapat Wongpattanakunkit
- Production location: Thailand
- Cinematography: Nattawat Chermchoi; Nattanon Jettanakan; Ittipong Klinchart; Nattapon Liamwinit; Supawat Morakotamporn; Anuchit Panyapliw; Rum Suknarong
- Editors: Peerawit Angkaria; Chankanet Leksomboon; Teerapong Limthongchai; Tawiporn Tianhom
- Running time: 45–49 minutes
- Production companies: The One Enterprise; GMMTV; Parbdee Tawesuk; Naver Webtoon Ltd.

Original release
- Network: GMM25
- Release: 31 March – 23 June 2025

Break Up Service (Thai: บริษัทลดรักเลิก, RTGS: Borisat Lot Rak Loek) is a 2025 Thai television series starring Jumpol Adulkittiporn (Off) and Jorin Khumpiraphan. The show is based on a Thai webtoon of the same name, written by Komai (กอไหม).

The series premiered on GMM 25 and TrueVisions Now on 31 March 2025, airing on Mondays at 20:30 ICT. The series concluded on 23 June 2025.

== Synopsis ==
Desperate for money, Jued (Jorin Khumpiraphan) is willing to do whatever it takes, even team up with Boss (Jumpol Adulkittiporn), a man who earns a living by ending other people's relationships. After an unlucky first encounter, Boss, a seasoned professional who usually works alone, constantly gives Jued a hard time. But Jued proves to be tougher than she looks and far more capable than either of them expected.

== Cast and characters ==
=== Main ===
- Jumpol Adulkittiporn as Pakorn Pasupakorn (Boss)
- Jorin Khumpiraphan as Jinsiree Sriwiangchuen (Jued)

=== Supporting ===
- Tachakorn Boonlupyanun (Godji) as Nut
- Patara Eksangkul (Foei) as Tee
- Thanakrit Panichawid (Wan) as Chan
- Tawan Vihokratana (Tay) as Oat
- Nipaporn Thititanakarn (Zani) as Kesorn (Chan's ex-wife)
- Prariyapit Yu (JingJing) as Rose

=== Guest ===
- Chayanon Akaradumrongdej (Udon) as Boss (5 years old) (Ep. 1)
- Kanthee Limpitikranon (Ken) as Boss (15 years old) (Ep. 1)
- Kirati Puangmalee (Title) as Ek (Jued's ex-boyfriend) (Ep. 1)
- Jiratchapong Srisang (Force) as First (trainer) (Ep. 2)
- Juthapich Indrajundra (Jaime) as Best (Yoga teacher) (Ep. 2)
- Thanathat Tanjararakas (Indy) as Gym receptionist (Ep. 3)
- Ochiris Suwanacheep (Aungpao) as Mocha (Ep. 3)
- Sattabut Laedeke (Drake) as Made (Ep. 3)
- Teepakron Kwanboon (Prom) as Ice (Ep. 3)
- Ployshompoo Supasap (Jan) as Kormai (Ep. 3, 6–8)
- Harit Cheewagaroon (Sing) as Pop Piya (Ep. 3, 6–7)
- Thasorn Klinnium (Emi) as Baimon (Ep. 4)
- Metawin Opas-iamkajorn (Win) as Baimai (Ep. 4)
- Kay Lertsittichai as Jang (Ep. 5)
- Kanyarat Ruangrung (Piploy) as Khao (Ep. 5)
- Teeradech Vitheepanich (Tee) as Kong (Ep. 5)
- Wanwimol Jaenasavamethee (June) as Nuch Neeranuch (Ep. 6–7)
- Ploynira Hiruntaveesin (Kapook) as Cupid (Destiny's employee) (Ep. 7, 9–10)
- Jeeratch Wongpian (Fluke) as Ryo (Ep. 7)
- Suphakorn Sriphothong (Pod) as Art (Ep. 8)
- Tipnaree Weerawatnodom (Namtan) as Cherry (Ep. 8–9)
- Panachai Sriariyarungruang (Junior) as Bee (Ep. 8–9)
- Bangkokboy as Stephen Choi (Ep. 10–11)
- Thitipoom Techaapaikhun (New) as Am (Oat's patient) (Ep. 12)

== Production ==
Break Up Service was one of 14 series announced during GMMTV 2024: Up & Above Part 2 event on 23 April 2024.
