= Napat Patcharachavalit =

Thai actor (born 2003)

- ณภัทร พัชรชวลิต
- Born: 6 January 2003 (age 23); Bangkok, Thailand
- Other name: Aun (อั๋น)
- Education: King Mongkut's University of Technology Thonburi
- Occupation: Actor
- Years active: 2020–present
- Agent: GMMTV
- Known for: Folk in My Gear and Your Gown; Jorn in My School President; Potae in Only Boo!; Mehkin in Revamp The Undead Story; Krit in Unlucky Bae

Napat Patcharachavalit (Thai: ณภัทร พัชรชวลิต; born 2003), nicknamed Aun (Thai: อั๋น), is a Thai actor. He is best known for his roles in My Gear and Your Gown (2020), My School President (2022), Only Boo! (2024), Revamp The Undead Story (2025) and Unlucky Bae (2026).

== Early life and education ==
Napat was born on 6 January 2003 in Bangkok, Thailand. In 2025, he graduated from King Mongkut's University of Technology Thonburi with a degree in civil engineering.

== Career ==
Napat began his career in the entertainment industry by competing in Go on Girl & Guy Star Search 2019, coming as the runner-up behind Yin Haoyu, and being a contestant on Smart Boy 2019 before signing a contract with GMMTV.

His first main role was in the 2020 boys' love series My Gear and Your Gown, his breakthrough role coming in 2022 with My School President. Since his debut, Napat has been a regular mainstay in the GMMTV boys' love scene, including being paired with former Project Alpha contestant Peerakan Teawsuwan (Ashi) for Only Boo! and Panachkorn Rueksiriaree (Stamp) for Revamp The Undead Story, Unlucky Bae and You Maniac.

== Filmography ==
=== Television series ===
Year	Title	Role	Notes	Network	Ref.
2017	Love Songs Love Series: Rueng Tee Koh	—N/a	Guest role	GMM 25	
2020	Turn Left Turn Right	Ham	Guest role	GMM 25	
2020	Girl Next Room: Motorbike Baby	Tanth	Supporting role	GMM 25	
2020	My Gear and Your Gown	Folk	Main role	GMM 25	
2021	Bad Buddy	—N/a	Guest role	GMM 25	
2022	Enchanté	Tan	Supporting role	GMM 25	
2022	Star & Sky: Sky in Your Heart	Sinsia	Supporting role	GMM 25	
2022	My School President	"Jorn" Khajorn	Supporting role	GMM 25	
2023	Our Skyy 2: TinnGun	"Jorn" Khajorn	Supporting role	GMM 25	
2024	Only Boo!	"Potae" Naphat Chaowalitkul	Supporting role	GMM 25	
2024	Perfect 10 Liners	Kong	Supporting role	GMM 25	
2024	ThamePo: Heart That Skips a Beat	"Potae" Naphat Chaowalitkul	Guest role	GMM 25	
2025	Boys in Love	Name	Supporting role	GMM 25	
2025	Whale Store xoxo	Wanan	Supporting role	GMM 25	
2025	Revamp The Undead Story	"Mekhin" Marquise Soleil	Supporting role	GMM 25	
2025	MuTeLuv: "Hi" by My Luck	"Mhee" Kirtsana Morakot-amphorn	Supporting role	GMM 25	
2026	My Romance Scammer	—N/a	Guest role	GMM 25	
2026	Unlucky Bae	"Krit" Kritchaphat Iamchaisree	Supporting role	GMM 25	
2026	You Maniac	Ohm	Supporting role	GMM 25	
TBA	Plan B to U †	TBA	TBA	TBA	
TBA	Starscope †	TBA	Supporting role	TBA	
TBA	Pie and the 7 Witches †	Gus	Supporting role	TBA	

=== Appearances in music videos ===
Year	Title	Artist(s)	Label	Ref.
2024	"เกินกว่า Friend (Situationship)"; Only Boo! OST	Ashi Peerakan	GMMTV Records	

== Discography ==
=== Singles ===
==== Soundtrack appearances ====
Year	Title	Soundtrack	Label	Ref.
2024	"ติดกลางใจ (Gump)" with Keen Suvijak, Ashi Peerakan, Louis Thanawin	Only Boo! OST	GMMTV Records	

== Fan meetings ==
Title	Date	Venue	Notes	Ref.
My School President: Prom Night Live on Stage	March 18–19, 2023	Union Hall, Union Mall	With My School President cast	
GMMTV FanDay 4 in Osaka	May 7, 2023	Dojima River Forum	With My School President cast	
My School President Fan Meeting in Cambodia	May 27–28, 2023	AEON Hall	With My School President cast	
My School President Fan Meeting in Taipei	July 8, 2023	Zepp New Taipei	With My School President cast	
My School President Fan Meeting in Singapore	July 1, 2023	Capitol Theatre	With My School President cast	
My School President Fan Meeting in Manila	August 5, 2023	University Theater of UP Diliman	With My School President cast	
My School President Fan Meeting in Hong Kong	August 12, 2023	AsiaWorld-Summit, AsiaWorld-Expo	With My School President cast	
My School President Fan Meeting in Vietnam	November 12, 2023	Hoa Binh Theater	With My School President cast	
My School President Fan Meeting in Tokyo	November 23, 2023	Belle Salle Shinjuku Grand Hall	With My School President cast	
My School President Fan Meeting in Seoul	November 25, 2023	Woonjung Green Campus Grand Hall, Sungshin Women's University	With My School President cast	
My School President Fan Meeting in Macau	December 3, 2023	H853 Fun Factory	With My School President cast	
Only Boo! Final Ep. Fan Meeting	June 23, 2024	9th Fl. Earthlab Cinema by Dr. CBD, SF World Cinema, CentralWorld	With Only Boo! cast	
Revamp The Undead Story: First Premiere	August 23, 2025	Siam Paragon, Siam Pavalai Theatre	With Revamp The Undead Story cast	
Revamp The Undead Story Final EP. Fan Meeting	October 25, 2025	Siam Paragon, Siam Pavalai Theatre	With Revamp The Undead Story cast	
Unlucky Bae: Meet & Mu Together	August 6, 2026	SF World Cinema, CentralWorld	With Unlucky Bae cast	
GMMTV Fanival: Happy Family	October 3, 2026	Union Hall, Union Mall	With Stamp	
Unlucky Bae Final EP. Lucky To Meet You	October 8, 2026	SF World Cinema, CentralWorld	With Unlucky Bae cast	

== Concerts ==
Title	Date	Venue	Notes	Ref.
GeminiFourth A.W.A.K.E. Concert	August 30–31, 2025	Impact Arena	With Gemini, Fourth, Winny, Satang, Mark, Ford, Prom, Captain	
JuniorMark Sunny Moon Concert	August 7, 2026	BITEC LIVE	With Junior, Mark, Poon, Save, Leo	
