= My Romance Scammer =

2026 Thai television series

- Official series poster
- Thai: รักจริง หลังแต่ง
- Genre: Romantic comedy; Drama
- Screenplay by: Sornpanath Patpho Suwanun Pohgudsai
- Directed by: Siwaj Sawatmaneekul
- Starring: Panachai Sriariyarungruang; Jiruntanin Trairattanayon; Thitiwat Ritprasert; Poon Mitpakdee
- Opening theme: "วางใจ (Trust Me)" by Junior Panachai and Mark Jiruntanin
- Ending theme: "รักหลอก (Love or Lie)" by Ohm Thitiwat and Poon Mitpakdee (Ep. 1–8) "ให้ได้รัก (Let Me Love You)" by Junior Panachai (Ep. 9–12)
- Composers: Panoth Khunprasert; Pure Kanin
- Country of origin: Thailand
- Original language: Thai
- No. of episodes: 12

Production
- Executive producers: Sataporn Panichraksapong; Darapa Choeysanguan
- Producers: Supaporn Lertthitiverakarn; Nuttapong Mongkolsawas
- Cinematography: Chanon Yingyong
- Running time: 55-60 minutes
- Production companies: GMMTV; Studio Wabi Sabi

Original release
- Network: GMM 25; WeTV
- Release: February 1 – April 19, 2026

My Romance Scammer (Thai: รักจริง หลังแต่ง lit. 'True Love After Marriage'; RTGS: Rak Ching Lang Taeng) is a 2026 Thai boys' love television series starring Panachai Sriariyarungruang (Junior), Jiruntanin Trairattanayon (Mark), Thitiwat Ritprasert (Ohm) and Poon Mitpakdee. The series premiered on GMM 25 on February 1, 2026, and concluded on April 19, 2026, after 12 episodes. It is available to stream on WeTV and the GMMTV official YouTube channel.

Directed by Siwaj Sawatmaneekul and produced by GMMTV and Studio Wabi Sabi, it was announced during GMMTV'S RIDING THE WAVE event on November 26, 2024.

== Synopsis ==
Pai (Jiruntanin Trairattanayon) and North (Poon Mitpakdee), two cousins and heirs to the billionaire empire known as the Thai-Chinese Jiramongkolthanun family, couldn't be more different. Pai is careful, guarded, and weighed down by the expectations of his family. North is an optimistic romanticist who believes in true love and is completely uninterested in the family businesses. But as different as they are, they both have the same problem: their love-lives have been infiltrated by romance scammers!

For the past year, Pai has let his walls down enough to be proposed to by his boyfriend Tim (Panachai Sriariyarungruang). Meanwhile, North secretly marries handsome stranger Yu (Thitiwat Ritprasert) after a chance encounter. Tim and Yu begrudgingly work together to save their own scams after realising they both have ulterior motives. Everything falls apart when Yu is caught out, leaving North unable to pursue divorce after signing over some of his assests to his false lover. Tim continues planning his wedding with Pai whilst trying to ignore the guilt of scamming the man he's starting to fall for. Yu is determined to prove his feelings have become genuine and win North's heart once again.

Will Pai ever learn the truth about Tim? Will Yu and North manage to complete their divorce? Can a love built on lies ever become real?

== Cast and characters ==
=== Main ===
- Panachai Sriariyarungruang (Junior) as Thanin Chaiyanuwat (Tim)
- Jiruntanin Trairattanayon (Mark) as Jirachot Jiramongkolthanun (Pai)
- Thitiwat Ritprasert (Ohm) as Itsara Preechajit (Yu)
- Poon Mitpakdee as Nipitpon Jiramongkolthanun (North)

=== Supporting ===
- Ploynira Hiruntaveesin (Kapook) as Nana
- Thanawin Teeraphosukarn (Louis) as Pure
- Kirati Puangmalee (Title) as Kuea
- Weerayut Chansook (Arm) as Prem
- Nattapat Nimjirawat (Mac) as Da Zhan Jiramongkolthanun
- Sarocha Watittapan (Tao) as Oom
- Pijika Jittaputta (Lookwa) as Kia Jiramongkolthanun
- Montree Jenuksorn (Pu) as Soepohn Jiramongkolthanun
- Warinda Damrongphol (Dada) as Airy
- Rudklao Amratisha (Tongneng) as Nart Preechajit

=== Guest ===
- Thinnaphan Tantui (Thor) as Juean (Ep. 4)
- Tanutchai Wijitvongtong (Mond) (Ep. 9)
- Save Saisawat (Ep. 9)
- Napat Patcharachavalit (Aun) (Ep. 9)

== Episodes ==
No.	Title	Original release date
1	"Episode One"	1 February 2026
After gaining the approval of his family, Pai's long-time boyfriend, Tim, proposes. Meanwhile, a heartbroken North gets lost and falls in love with the handsome Yu, leading them to sign their marriage papers only a day after meeting.
2	"Episode Two"	8 February 2026
Pai and North fight over the validity of Yu and North's marriage whilst Tim and Yu make a wary truce in order to protect themselves. Yu's past comes back to haunt him as he and Tim recognise each other for who they really are.
3	"Episode Three"	15 February 2026
Tim and Yu continue to scheme together as Yu attempts to gain Pai's favour through their shared affection for North. Yu and North consider having a real wedding ceremony whilst Pai dodges the increasingly controlling behaviour of Kia.
4	"Episode Four"	22 February 2026
North unintentionally exposes Yu as a scammer and must divorce him as per Pai's orders. Tim is determined to marry Pai more than ever. North and Pure hatch a plan to test where Yu's loyalty lies. Tim hires Prem as a lawyer to represent Yu.
5	"Episode Five"	1 March 2026
Pai and Tim meet with Kuea to discuss their gated community project whilst Yu helps North and Pure with their failing bakery. North is still in love with Yu but cannot trust him. As Pai risks his relationship to his family, Tim resolves to end his own scam and commit to his true feelings for Pai.
6	"Episode Six"	8 March 2026
Yu takes North to his real home as he and Oom explain their entire scam. Just as it seems Yu and North are to part ways for good, Tim and Pai meet with Kuea once again as they prepare for their upcoming wedding. Tim finally breaks off his mutual arrangement with Airy, now fully committed to Pai and their future together.
7	"Episode Seven"	15 March 2026
With Tim's scam finally exposed, Pai's world crumbles as he and North are both disowned for the shame they brought to their family. With nowhere else to go, the two former heirs must turn to their scammers for help. Yu and North decide to officially restart their relationship as Tim tries to break down Pai's rebuilt walls.
8	"Episode Eight"	22 March 2026
Since North and Pure's bakery is the only business not tied to the Jiramongkolthanun family assets, Pai decides the four outcasts must embrace their situation as best they can. Yu meets with his mother for closure as she meets with North behind Yu's back. Tim and Pai have one final dinner together before Pai goes back to insisting on their divorce.
9	"Episode Nine"	29 March 2026
Nana seeks out North with a proposition from his Grandfather. North only agrees to finally join the family business if Yu can come with him. Pai spends his day as a free man going on dates, with Tim following along at every turn. Kia uses Da Zhan to test North's competency. After spending the rest of their day together, Tim resolves to never let Pai feel lonely again.
10	"Episode Ten"	5 April 2026
Pai tries to juggle working at the bakery with feeling lonelier than ever. Yu and North get bumped up to the sales team where they are pitted against each other. Tim recruits Pure to help Pai's parents make contact with their son again. The cousins' Grandfather takes matters into his own hands.
11	"Episode Eleven"	12 April 2026
As Kuea attempts to finally bridge the gap between himself and Pai, Yu and North attempt to intervene on Tim's behalf. Tim finally introduces his real family to Pai and comes clean about his past at the patriarch's orders. Yu asks North a question that will change their relationship forever.
12	"Episode Twelve"	19 April 2026
Pai must look after Da Zhan whilst Kia is away on business. Soepohn threatens to ruin the scammers' lives if they hurt his grandsons again. North is tired of performing for everyone else's expectations. As minor misunderstandings threaten to tear the happy couples apart once again, Tim, Pai, Yu and North must confront their partners and embrace their futures together.

== Production ==
The series was directed by Siwaj Sawatmaneekul with scripts by Nontakorn Padpo and Suwanan Phokutsai. Executive production was handled by Sataporn Panichraksapong and Darapa Choeysanguan. Supaporn Lertthitiverakarn and Nuttapong Mongkolsawas served as producers. On August 19, 2025, it was announced that the role of North would be recast from Jeeratch Wongpian (Fluke) to Poon Mitpakdee after the latter's acting partnership with Natarit Worakornlertsith (Marc) was formally dissolved. Both Fluke and Marc would go on to pursue roles in the TV series Dare You to Death as a result of this. Production officially concluded on February 11, 2026.

== Release ==
My Romance Scammer premiered on February 1, 2026, concluded on April 19, 2026, with 12 episodes of approximately 55–60 minutes each. Episoded aired weekly on Sundays via GMM 25 and are also available on WeTV via paid subscription and GMMTV’s official YouTube channel.

== Original soundtrack ==
The official soundtrack for My Romance Scammer features:

Song	Artist(s)	Label	Ref.
"วางใจ (Trust Me)"	Junior Panachai and Mark Jiruntanin	GMMTV Records	
"รักหลอก (Love or Lie)"	Ohm Thitiwat and Poon Mitpakdee	GMMTV Records	
"ให้ได้รัก (Let Me Love You)"	Junior Panachai	GMMTV Records	

== Reception ==
My Romance Scammer received wide coverage in Thai and international media. Sanook highlighted the plot's focus on romance scams and family inheritance, Kapook emphasized the dilemmas between love and deception, and The Geekiary reviewed early episodes as engaging, praising the chemistry between the leads.

== Fan meetings ==
Year	Title	Date	Venue	Ref.
2026	My Romance Scammer : Love at First Scam	February 1, 2026	6th Fl. Siam Paragon - Siam Pavalai, Paragon Cineplex	
2026	My Romance Scammer Final EP. FAN MEETING	April 19, 2026	MCC HALL FL. 3, THE MALL LIFESTORE BANGKAE	
