= Jeeratch Wongpian =

Thai actor (born 1998)

- จีรัสณ์ วงศ์เพียร
- Born: Pongsakorn Wongpian; 13 August 1998 (age 28); Bangkok, Thailand
- Other name: Fluke (ฟลุ๊ค)
- Education: Bangkok University
- Occupation: Actor
- Years active: 2020–present
- Agents: Mono Talent Studio (2020–2024); GMMTV (2024–present)
- Known for: Jet in Perfect 10 Liners; Thaenkhun in Dare You to Death
- Height: 1.79 m (5 ft 10 in)

Jeeratch Wongpian (Thai: จีรัสณ์ วงศ์เพียร; born Pongsakorn Wongpian on 13 August 1998), known professionally as Fluke, is a Thai actor. He is best known for his leading roles in the series My Ride (2022) and The Whisperer (2023), and his roles in The Heart Killers (2025), Perfect 10 Liners (2025), and Dare You to Death (2025).

== Early life and career ==
Jeeratch was born in Bangkok, Thailand. He graduated with a degree in Communication Arts from Bangkok University. Before entering the entertainment industry, he won the GSB Gen Campus Star 2018 competition. In 2020, he made his film debut as Hip-Hop in Make Money. The following year, he appeared in the historical comedy film Om! Crush on Me (Ayothaya Mahalayaloi), portraying Asim. In 2022, he gained wider recognition for his leading role as Mork in the BL series My Ride, starring opposite Chawinroj Likitcharoensakul (Fame). In 2023, he returned to a leading role as Khun in The Whisperer. He later joined productions under GMMTV, appearing in series such as Perfect 10 Liners, The Heart Killers, Ossan's Love Thailand and Break Up Service. In 2024, he was announced as the lead actor of My Romance Scammer opposite Thitiwat Ritprasert (Ohm), but was later replaced by Poon Mitpakdee.

== Filmography ==
=== Film ===
Year	Title	Role	Notes
2020	Make Money	Hip-Hop	Main role.
2021	Om! Crush on Me (Ayothaya Mahalayaloi)	Asim	Supporting role
2026	Yai Sa	Sa	Main role

=== Television series ===
Key
†	Denotes television productions that have not yet been released

Year	Title	Role	Notes	Network
2022	My Ride	Mork	Main role	WeTV
2023	The Whisperer	Khun	Main role	Workpoint TV
2024	Perfect 10 Liners	Jet	Supporting role	GMM 25
2024	The Heart Killers	Fluke	Supporting role	GMM 25
2025	Ossan's Love Thailand	JJ	Guest role	GMM 25
2025	Break Up Service	Ryo	Guest role	GMM 25
2025	Dare You to Death	Thaenkhun Iriyasasanakul	Supporting role	GMM 25
2026	Good Boy	Tinnapob	Supporting role	GMM 25
2026	Gunshot †	Pokpong	Supporting role	GMM 25

== Awards and nominations ==
Year	Award	Category	Work	Result
2018	GSB Gen Campus Star	Male Winner	—N/a	Won
