= Katsamonnat Namwirote =

Thai actor (born 1996)

- กัษมนณัฎฐ์ นามวิโรจน์
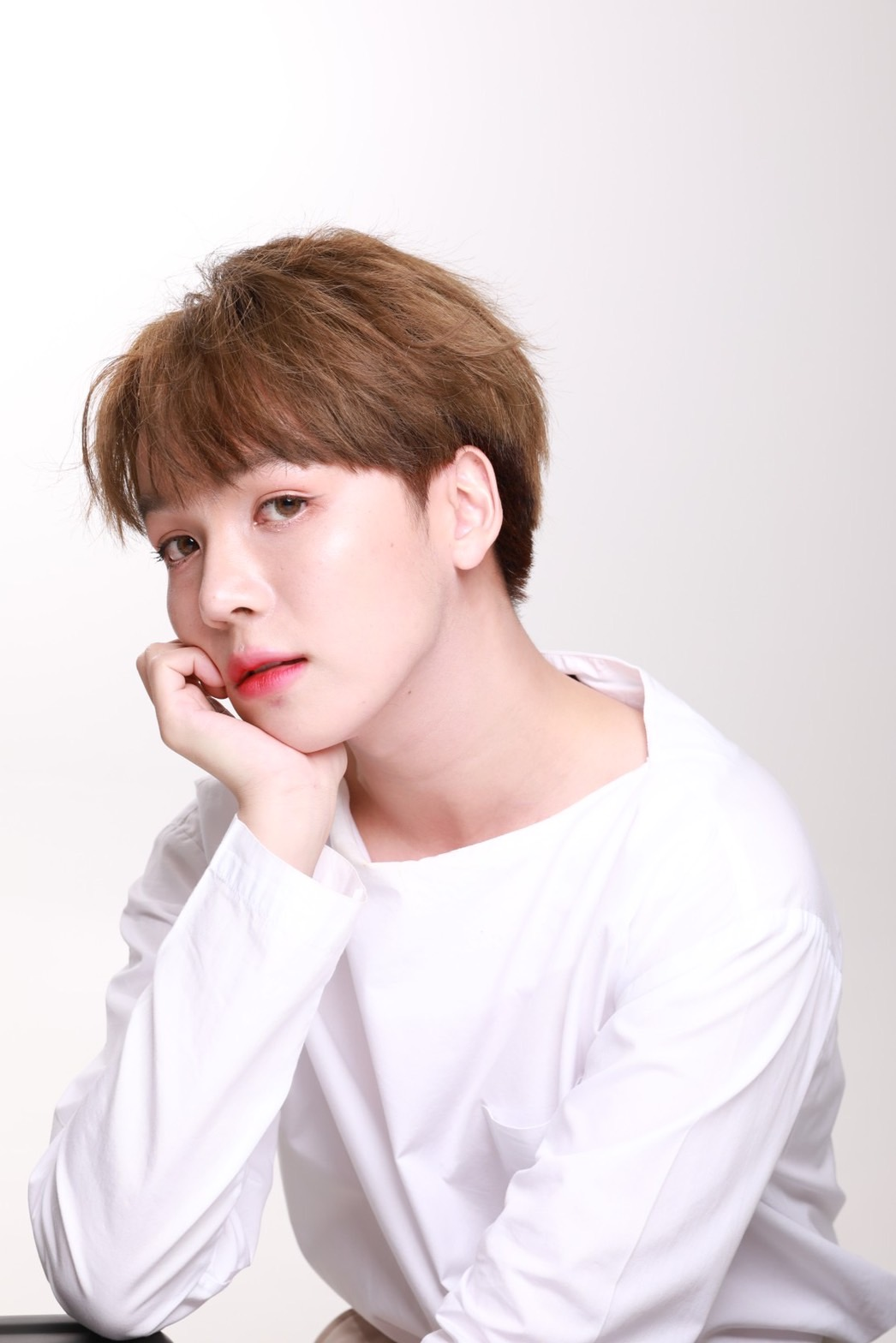
- Katsamonnat in March 2022
- Born: 1 November 1996 (age 29); Chiang Mai, Thailand
- Other name: Earth (เอิร์ธ)
- Education: Chiang Mai University
- Occupation: Actor
- Years active: 2017–present
- Notable work: Until We Meet Again (TV series) (2019)
- Website: instagram.com/cooheart/

Katsamonnat Namwirote (Thai: กัษมนณัฎฐ์ นามวิโรจน์, RTGS: Katsamonnat Namwirot; born 1 November 1996) is a Thai actor.

== Early life and education ==
Katsamonnat Namwirote was born on November 1, 1996 in Thailand. He graduated in architecture at Chiang Mai University.

== Career ==
Namwirote made his acting debut as Pie in the 2017 movie Let Me Kiss You. In 2018, he had his break in the entertainment industry for his portrayal of Tar in the popular BL drama series Love By Chance and its 2020 sequel, A Chance to Love. His acting ability gained further recognition when he played Intouch in Until We Meet Again: The Series in 2019.

== Personal life ==
Namwirote is openly gay. He also owns his own clothing brand named CIELO. In July 2018, he was ordained as a Buddhist monk.

== Filmography ==
=== Film ===
Year	Title	Role
2017	Let Me Kiss You	Pie
2019	Love: Must Fight	
2019	Love: Must Take it Off	

=== Television ===
Year	Title	Role	Notes
2018	Love by Chance	Tar	Main role
2019	Until We Meet Again	Intouch Wongnate	Main role
2020	A Chance to Love	Tar	Main role
2021	7 Project	Pavin Lertpana / Ozone	Main role
2022	Saneha Stories Season 4: Thanon Sai Saneha	Em	Main role
2022	War of Y	New ship	Guest role
2022	My Only 12%	Seeiw	Main role
2024–2025	Fourever You	Easter "Ter"	Main role
