= Sky in Your Heart =

2022 Thai television series

- Official series poster
- Thai: ขั้วฟ้าของผม
- Genre: Comedy; Romance
- Based on: ขั้วฟ้าของผม by Peachhplease
- Screenplay by: Pratchaya Thavornthummarut
- Directed by: Siwaj Sawatmaneekul
- Starring: Jirakit Thawornwong; Jiruntanin Trairattanayon
- Opening theme: "กลางทาง (Our Way)" by Mek Jirakit
- Ending theme: "ท้องฟ้ากับแสงดาว (Star & Sky)" by Louis Thanawin
- Country of origin: Thailand
- Original language: Thai
- No. of episodes: 8

Production
- Executive producers: Sataporn Panichraksapong; Darapa Choeysanguan
- Producer: Nuttapong Mongkolsawas
- Cinematography: Saran Jantharakkha
- Running time: 41 - 47 minutes
- Production companies: GMMTV; Studio Wabi Sabi

Original release
- Network: GMM 25; Viu
- Release: June 3 – July 22, 2022

Related
- Star in My Mind

Sky in Your Heart (Thai: ขั้วฟ้าของผม; RTGS: Khuafah Khong Phom) is a 2022 Thai boys' love television series starring Jirakit Thawornwong (Mek) and Jiruntanin Trairattanayon (Mark). It is the second installment of the duology series Star & Sky. It aired on GMM 25 on June 3, 2022, airing Fridays at 20:30 ICT and streaming on Viu at 22:30 ICT the same day.

Directed by Siwaj Sawatmaneekul and produced by GMMTV and Studio Wabi Sabi, the series was announced at the GMMTV "BORDERLESS" event on 1 December 2021.

== Synopsis ==
After driving whilst inebriated and crashing, Fah (Jirakit Thawornwong) and his friends are forced to stay in a mountain community and run the medical center as community service. When Fah meets Prince (Jiruntanin Trairattanayon), a volunteer teacher who seems to despise him, they argue and slowly come to understand one another. After all, two very different people left alone on a mountain can be romantic if the circumstances are just right.

== Cast and characters ==
=== Main ===
- Jirakit Thawornwong (Mek) as Khuafah Pitakchetaponkul (Fah)
- Jiruntanin Trairattanayon (Mark) as Na Chiang Dao (Prince)

=== Supporting ===
- Natachai Boonprasert (Dunk) as Daonuea Wattana-wattanachot (Nuea / Dao)
- Archen Aydin (Joong) as Kanaruj Wongthampanich (Khabklen / Kluen)
- Weerayut Chansook (Arm) as Mesa
- Chinnarat Siriphongchawalit (Mike) as JJ
- Jirakit Kuariyakul (Toptap) as Ou
- Napat Patcharachavalit (Aun) as Sinsia
- Sureeyares Yakares (Prigkhing) as Yaya
- Supoj Janjareonborn (Lift) as The Village Chief

=== Guest ===
- Chayakorn Jutamas (JJ) as Pokpong / Pong
- Thanawin Pholcharoenrat (Winny) as Nay
- Thinnaphan Tantui (Thor) as Noel
- Ornanong Panyawong (Orn) as Prince's mother
- Ratchapong Anomakiti (Poppy) as Buay
- Supawadee Khunthi (Tongkhow) as a villager

== Original soundtrack ==
The official soundtrack for Sky in My Heart features:

Song	Artist(s)	Label	Ref.
"กลางทาง (Our Way)"	Mek Jirakit	GMMTV Records	
"ท้องฟ้ากับแสงดาว (Star & Sky)"	Louis Thanawin	GMMTV Records	
