= Unforgotten Night =

2022 Thai television series

- Thai: ร้ายนักนะ รักของมาเฟีย
- Literally: Unforgotten Night
- Genre: Romantic drama; Boys' love; Action
- Directed by: Ong-art Singlumpong
- Starring: Yoon Phusanu Wongsavanischakorn; Ton Saran Anantasetthakul; Ging Areeya Pholphutrakul; Gun Thapanawat Kaewbumrung
- Country of origin: Thailand
- Original language: Thai
- No. of episodes: 12

Production
- Producer: Wayu Pattarawut Sangyahya
- Running time: 45 minutes
- Production company: Y Entertainment

Original release
- Network: GMM 25
- Release: 22 June – 7 September 2022

Unforgotten Night (Thai: ร้ายนักนะ รักของมาเฟีย) is a 2022 Thai television series in the romantic drama, action and boys' love (BL) genres. It was directed by Ong-art Singlumpong, produced by Y Entertainment and aired on GMM 25. The series stars Yoon Phusanu Wongsavanischakorn and Saran Anantasetthakul (Ton) in the lead roles.

The series aired from 22 June to 7 September 2022, with weekly episodes on Wednesdays on GMM 25. It is also available on Viki and iQIYI.

== Synopsis ==
Kim (Ton Saran) is a 25-year-old office worker who has been secretly in love with his coworker Day (Khopkhet Natkharin) for years. Trying to get over his unrequited feelings, he decides to spend a night with a stranger he meets at a bar. What he did not expect was that the stranger would be Kamol (Yoon Phusanu), a 30-year-old mafia boss with specific needs who had never found anyone who could satisfy him.

From that night on, Kamol decides he will not let Kim go. He starts pursuing him, and slowly the two become involved in an intense and dangerous relationship, surrounded by conflicts from the criminal underworld and secrets from the past.

== Cast ==
=== Main ===
- Phusanu Wongsavanischakorn (Yoon) as Kamol-
- Saran Anantasetthakul (Ton) as Kim

=== Supporting ===
- Ging Areeya Pholphutrakul (Ging) as Cherry
- Gun Thapanawat Kaewbumrung (Gun) as Khom
- Peat Suchanon Chueluecha (Peat) as Baiboon
- Khopkhet Natkharin Tankaew (Khopkhet) as Day
- Ice Saranwich Nilsinthop (Ice) as Itt
- Ku Deachit Daosaengpetch (Ku) as Kit
- Tong Supanut Sudjinda (Tong) as Lop
- Akin Akinkorn Limsilatham (Akin) as Ruj
- Baitoey Punnisa Sirisang (Baitoey) as Metawee
- Sammy Samantha Melanie Coates (Sammy) as Jin
- Beam Sarunyoo Prachakit (Beam) as Danai

=== Guest ===
- Jeab Paweena Charivsakul as Nee (Baiboon's grandmother) (Ep. 2, 4, 10-12)
- Ball Saranwut Chatjaratsaeng (Ball) as Kim's friend (Ep. 3)
- Amen Sotthibandhu Komeluecha (Amen) as Danil (Ep. 9-12)
- Utt Uttsada Panichkul (Utt) as Evan
- Kirati Puangmalee (Title) as Karan
- Kuma Punnathorn Pornprasit (Kuma) as Salmon (Itt's nephew)
- Suchao Pongwilai as Kim's father
- Tai Penpak Sirikul as Kim's mother

== Production ==
The series was announced in August 2021 by Y Entertainment. The production was based on an online novel that had accumulated over 15.9 million views on reading applications. The executive producer was Wayu Pattarawut Sangyahya, and the series was directed by Ong-art Singlumpong.

The blessing ceremony took place in January 2022. Filming took place throughout 2021 and 2022. The series generated high expectations among genre fans even before its premiere.

The premiere event, featuring a screening of the first episode, was attended by the cast and fans.

== Release and reception ==
The series premiered on 22 June 2022 on GMM 25, airing weekly on Wednesdays at 11:00 p.m. (local time).

The series was a ratings success on online platforms, surpassing 1 million views per episode. The official hashtag often appeared among trending topics on Twitter/X during its broadcast.

The series is also available internationally on Viki and iQIYI.
