= My Bromance (TV series) =

2016–2021 Thai television series

- Genre: Boys' love; Drama; Romance
- Directed by: Tosatid Danrkhuntod
- Starring: Chaiya Jirapirom; Patpasit Songkla; Kwantuch Takuathung; Oumjaroem Chatchawal
- Opening theme: "ครั้งแรก (Krung Raek)” by Bass Hello Icons
- Ending theme: “ฝาก (Fahk)” by Bass Hello Icons
- Country of origin: Thailand
- Original language: Thaï
- No. of seasons: 2
- No. of episodes: 21 (12+9)

Production
- Running time: 45 minutes
- Production company: Greatest Entertainment

Original release
- Network: MCOT; 9MCOT HD; Line TV
- Release: December 11, 2016 – February 3, 2021

Related
- My Bromance (2014)

My Bromance (Thai: My Bromance พี่ชาย เดอะซีรีส์) is a Thai boys' love drama television series produced by Greatest Entertainment that aired on MCOT. The series starring Chaiya Jirapirom and Patpasit Songkla. It was filmed primarily in Thailand and is based on the 2014 film My Bromance. The first season ran for 12 episodes in 2016. The second season, titled My Bromance: 5 Years Later (Thai: พี่ชาย My Bromance 2: 5 Years Later), consisted of 9 episodes, which aired in 2021.

== Synopsis ==
Golf's and Bank's homophobic father/stepfather, sends Bank to the US to study, while a devastated Golf stays in Bangkok, Thailand, after knowing their relationship. However 8 years later, Bank and Golf returns home from their respective trips (Bank was in Los Angeles working on a project as a researcher), and (Golf returns from a working trip in Pulau Weh, Indonesia as an experienced diver). Unbeknownst to Golf, is that Bank is attached to his overseas boyfriend (Jackson) of 2 years. Who will Bank choose, Golf, a lover/brother for more than 8 years or his soon to be husband (Jackson) of 2 years.

== Cast and characters ==
Character	Portrayed by	Remarks
"Bank" Naivinann	Chaiya Jirapirom	Nickname: "GD Oppa" (used by Jieb); Golf's stepbrother; Boy's brother; Thara's biological son; Vut's stepson; Engaged to Jackson in Episode 1; Golf's love interest; Researcher in aquatic sciences; Classmates with Golf, Waen, Paan, Jieb and Tar; Referred as a sweet natured, gentle and considerate boy; Golf's junior by 3 months; Good with maps; Born in Chonburi; Threatened by Golf in Episode 2 to strip down; Afraid of removing clothes, due to a scar on his back (His own father often hit him when he was younger); Love Golf at first sight (Episode 5)
"Golf" Jirayut Atsawametanon	Patpasit Songkla	Bank's step brother; Boy's brother; Vut's biological son; Thara's step son; Bank's love interest; Jackson's and Thom's love rival; Referred as a playboy, likes playing truant, bad tempered and easily jealous; Bank's senior by 3 months; Diver in Aquatic Sciences; Good in soccer/football; Classmates with Bank, Waen, Paan, Jieb and Tar; Threatened Bank in Episode 2 to strip down; Love Bank at first sight (Episode 5)
Thara		Bank's biological mother; Boy's biological mother; Vut's second wife; Golf's step mother
Vut	Kwantuch Takuathung	Golf's biological father; Boy's biological father; Thara's husband; Bank's step father; Hospitalized in Episode 3
Ping		Golf's biological mother; Vut's first wife; Suicide 2 years ago by medication
Bing		Golf's Aunt; Ping's Sister; Bang's mother; Relocated to Chiang Mai and has poor health
Bang		Golf's cousin; Vut's niece; Bing's daughter; Relocated to Chiang Mai since Mai has poor health
Boy		Vut's and Thara's biological son; Golf's step brother; Bank's biological brother
"Jieb" Jintara Chompoo		Classmates with Golf, Waen, Paan, Bank and Tar; Worshipped Bank in Episode 2
Paan		Classmates with Golf, Waen, Bank, Jieb and Tar
Tar		Classmates with Golf, Waen, Paan, Jieb and Bank
"Waen" Natwut	Oumjaroem Chatchawal	Classmates with Golf, Bank, Paan, Jieb and Tar; Likes classical music
Jackson		Chief Researcher in Aquatic Sciences; Bank's unmarried fiancé (Episode 1)
Thom		Nickname: "Top Oppa" (used by Jieb); Likes Bank; Gave uniform to Bank in Episode 2, as Golf threatens Bank to strip off his clothes

== Episodes ==
=== Season 1 ===
Episode no.	Original air date
1	December 11, 2016
Bank and Golf returns home from their trip (Bank was on his trip to Los Angeles) and Golf (on a diving trip in Pulau Weh, Indonesia), both stepbrothers were reunited, but Golf was shocked to find out that Bank were engaged to his boyfriend of two years while on his trip to Los Angeles. Golf unable to accept this piece of news, quarreled with his family members over Bank's new room which is just beside his.: This episode has several flashbacks dated 8 years ago, when Golf is not forgiving and has several disputes with his family members including the new members Bank and Thara. Golf also targeted Bank for barging into the room besides theirs and damaged a photo-frame, and Golf punished Bank to spend the night outside the house.
2	December 18, 2016
Bank returns to the old house, but was disturbed by a group of hooligans who are Golf's friends, and when he threatens to call the police, a fight ensues, and Golf tries to protect Bank but was injured. Later one of the men, said something that irritates Golf who later tries to challenge. Golf selfishness on not to sell the house enrages Bang, whom later rushes out of the house and a concerned Bank told Bang that her would help to convince Golf in selling the house, as both are co-owners of the house. (Bang has relocated to Chiang Mai, and requires a sum of money to get her mum's health back). Golf returns to Pulau Weh, Indonesia and met up with Jieb, who informs her that Bank is about to marry.: This episode has several flashbacks dated eight years ago. Golf burns off Bank's books and clothes and threatens Bank to strip off his clothes in school, and Thom gave a near naked Bank his clothes. Bank met his new classmates, including Jieb whom is obsessed with Korean pop stars, and worshiped Bank as her new 'Oppa'. Jieb and her friends later knew from Bank that Golf is his stepbrother.
3	December 25, 2016
TBA: This episode has several flashbacks dated 8 years ago,
4	January 1, 2017
While visiting Golf at his room, Jieb found out that Golf was having a threesome with two girls. Vut had small talk with the discharge nurse and told her that he had spent so long selling a product that he got to use finally. Golf brought Jieb to a pier that was the place where Golf scattered his mum's ashes years ago.: This episode has several flashbacks dated 8 to 10 years ago. Vut visits his ailing wife Ping, and was sorry for what he has done to the family, Bank is helping Jieb and her group of friends in practicing a Korean dance move, when Thom popped by, and instantly worshiped the two being together. Jieb also informs Thom that Bank will be dancing for the event, which makes Thom super happy. Thom picks Bank home after school. Upon reaching home, Bank helps Aunt Bing in folding clothes and bringing it to the deceased Ping's room, but while asking Bing some questions on Bing, Bank takes out a bottle of medicines from Ping's cabinet, and was chided by Bing. Upon knowing this, Bang stepped in to mediate and tell what happened to Ping two years ago. Also Bank discovers that his mum met his now stepfather one year ago, and not two years ago as suggested. Golf was sent to the discipline master's room.
5	January 8, 2017
TBA: This episode has several flashbacks dated 8 years ago,
