= Cherry Magic (Thai TV series) =

2023–24 Thai television series

- Official series poster
- Thai: Cherry Magic 30 ยังซิง
- Genre: Boys' love; Romantic comedy; Drama
- Created by: GMMTV
- Based on: Cherry Magic! Thirty Years of Virginity Can Make You a Wizard?! by Yuu Toyota
- Directed by: Nuttapong Mongkolsawas
- Starring: Tawan Vihokratana; Thitipoom Techaapaikhun; Panachai Sriariyarungruang; Jiruntanin Trairattanayon
- Country of origin: Thailand
- Original language: Thai
- No. of episodes: 12

Production
- Running time: 45 minutes
- Production companies: GMM Grammy; GMMTV

Original release
- Network: GMM 25; Viu
- Release: 9 December 2023 – 2 March 2024

Related
- Cherry Magic! Thirty Years of Virginity Can Make You a Wizard?!

Cherry Magic (Thai: Cherry Magic 30 ยังซิง; lit. 'Cherry Magic 30 Still Single') is a 2023 Thai boys' love television series produced by GMMTV. The series is the Thai adaptation of Yuu Toyota's yaoi manga Cherry Magic! Thirty Years of Virginity Can Make You a Wizard?! starring Tawan Vihokratana (Tay) and Thitipoom Techaapaikhun (New).

== Synopsis ==
Achi (Thitipoom Techaapaikhun), a worker at a stationery company, discovers an article stating that once he turns 30 and is still a virgin, he will gain a special power. He soon figures out that he has gained a special power—the ability to read people's minds—but everything takes a turn once he reads the mind of Karan (Tawan Vihokratana), his most famous, handsome, and kind coworker having a crush on him. Knowing this, Achi tries his best to keep his distance.

== Cast and characters ==
=== Main ===
- Tawan Vihokratana (Tay) as Karan Wongkarun
- Thitipoom Techaapaikhun (New) as Achirawit Jittawisut (Achi)

=== Supporting ===
- Panachai Sriariyarungruang (Junior) as Jinta
- Jiruntanin Trairattanayon (Mark) as Min
- Ployshompoo Supasap (Jan) as Pai
- Harit Cheewagaroon (Sing) as Rock Banphot
- Thanaporn Wagprayoon (Parn) as Dujdao
- Sereeroj Jayaphorn (Roj) as Tanaka

=== Guest ===
- Keita Tanaka as Ikeda
- Janya Thanasawaangkoun (Ya) as Achi's aunt
- Phromphiriya Thongputtaruk (Papang) as Pai's ex-sweetheart
- Thanida Manalertruengkul (Pimtha) as Karan's older sister
- Phassapong Boonvittayakul (Time) as Min's friend
- Pongpak Pimsarn (Boss) as Min's friend
- Peerakan Teawsuwan (Ashi) as Min's friend
- Pijika Jittaputta (Lookwa) as Khem
- Hattaya Wongkrachang (Ple)
- Warapun Nguitragool
- Sivakorn Lertchuchot (Guy)
- Varot Makaduangkeo (Arm)

== Soundtrack ==
Date Released	Song title	Artist(s)	Label	Ref.
9 Dec 2023	"แอบตะโกน (Loudest Love)"	Tawan Vihokratana and Thitipoom Techaapaikhun	GMMTV Records	
16 Dec 2023	"พลังวิเศษของคนไม่พิเศษ (Everything is Magic)"	Thitipoom Techaapaikhun	GMMTV Records	
6 Jan 2024	"ถ้าเธอได้ยิน (Voice Within)"	Tawan Vihokratana	GMMTV Records	

== Release ==
On 21 December 2023, GMMTV stated on their social media pages the need to suspend the broadcast of the film on YouTube to all viewers outside of Thailand until further notice. The original author, Yuu Toyota shocked upon hearing it, stated that she was not involved in the suspension of the airing. Nevertheless, the drama could still be viewed by international viewers using Viu with added English subtitles.

== Reception ==
Upon its release, Cherry Magic quickly became the number one trending topic in the Philippines and Thailand on X (formerly Twitter).

=== Accolades ===
==== Listicles ====
Year-end lists for Cherry Magic
Critic/Publication	List	Rank	Ref.
Teen Vogue	13 Best BL Dramas of 2024	Included	
