= Panachai Sriariyarungruang =

Thai actor (born 1996)

- ปณชัย ศรีอาริยะรุ่งเรือง
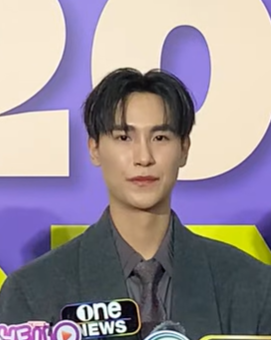
- Panachai in November 2024
- Born: 23 October 1996 (age 30); Bangkok, Thailand
- Other name: Junior (จูเนียร์)
- Education: Chulalongkorn University
- Occupations: Actor; Singer
- Years active: 2017–present
- Agents: Nadao Bangkok (2018–2022); GMMTV (2022–present)
- Known for: Jinta in Cherry Magic; Faifa in Perfect 10 Liners; Tim in My Romance Scammer
- Height: 1.81 m (5 ft 11 in)

Panachai Sriariyarungruang (Thai: ปณชัย ศรีอาริยะรุ่งเรือง; born 23 October 1996), nicknamed Junior (Thai: จูเนียร์), is a Thai actor known for his roles in Cherry Magic (2023), Perfect 10 Liners (2024) and My Romance Scammer (2026).

== Career ==
Previously an actor under Nadao Bangkok, he continued his acting career under Thai television production agent GMMTV in late 2022. He gained widespread recognition for his role as Faifa in the 2024 television series Perfect 10 Liners.

== Filmography ==
=== Film ===
Year	Title	Role	Notes
2017	ABABO: Group O	"Junior" Narongrit	Supporting role

=== Television series ===
Key
†	Denotes television productions that have not yet been released

Year	Title	Role	Network	Notes	Ref.
2016	I Hate You, I Love You	—N/a	Line TV	Guest role	
2017	Project S: Spike!	Nao	GMM 25	Supporting role	
2019	The Golden Silkworm	Thot	One 31	Supporting role	
2020	Quarantine Stories (Ep. 6)	Meng	GMM 25	Main role	
2020	Bad Genius	Third	One 31	Supporting role	
2020	The Graduates	Job	Line TV	Main role	
2021	#Hatetag (Ep. 10: #CyberExposure)	Himself	Line TV	Main role	
2022	Club Sapan Fine Season 2 (Ep. 6: Sud Pang Phalang Ting)	A-chi	AIS Play	Main role	
2023	Midnight Museum	"Tum" Nonthakon Phanpho	GMM 25	Guest role	
2023	Cherry Magic	Jinta	GMM 25	Supporting role	
2024	Peaceful Property	Ju	GMM 25	Guest role	
2024	Perfect 10 Liners	Faifa	GMM 25	Main role	
2025	Break Up Service	Bee	GMM 25	Guest role	
2025	I Love 'A Lot Of' You	Phat	GMM 25	Supporting role	
2025	My Magic Prophecy	Tul	GMM 25	Supporting role	
2025	Revamp The Undead Story	Mun Dal	GMM 25	Guest role	
2025	Melody of Secrets	Thunphob Rongsomphong	One 31	Guest role	
2026	My Romance Scammer	"Tim" Thanin Chaiyanuwat	GMM 25	Main role	
2026	Peach and Me	Himself	GMM 25	Guest role	
TBA	Twenty One †	Aii	TBA	Main role	
TBA	Her †	Apo Wanwara	TBA	Supporting role	
TBA	Boys 4 Moms †	"Kin" Phakin	TBA	Main role	
TBA	High & Low: Born to Be High †	Tiger	TBA	TBA	

== Discography ==
=== Singles ===
==== Collaborations ====
Year	Title	Label	Ref.
2025	"อย่าน่ารักเกิน (Cutie Overload)" with Mark	GMMTV Records	
2026	"Love Feels So Fast" with Mark, Earth, Mix, Boun, Prem, Pond, Phuwin, Force, Book, Joong, Dunk, Jimmy, Sea, First, Khaotung, Gemini, Fourth, Perth, Santa, William, Est, Joss, Gawin	GMMTV Records	

==== Soundtrack appearances ====
Year	Title	Album	Label	Ref.
2024	"วันนี้ (Perfect)" with Mark Jiruntanin, Force Jiratchapong, Book Kasidet, Perth Tanapon, Santa Pongsapak	Perfect 10 Liners OST	GMMTV Records	
2024	"ทดลองรัก (Trial Love)" with Mark Jiruntanin	Perfect 10 Liners OST	GMMTV Records	
2026	"วางใจ (Trust Me)" with Mark Jiruntanin	My Romance Scammer OST	GMMTV Records	
2026	"ให้ได้รัก (Let Me Love You)"	My Romance Scammer OST	GMMTV Records	

== Fan meetings ==
Title	Date	Venue	Notes	Ref.
Perfect 10 Liners: First Date	October 27, 2024	Siam Pavalai Theatre, Paragon Cineplex	With Perfect 10 Liners Cast	
GMMTV Fan Day 20 in Taipei	March 7, 2025	WESTAR	With Mark	
Perfect 10 Liners: Bye Nior Fan Party	April 6, 2025	MCC Hall 4th Fl. The Mall Lifestore Ngamwongwan	With Perfect 10 Liners Cast	
Perfect 10 Liners: Bye Nior After Party	April 7, 2025	MCC Hall 4th Fl. The Mall Lifestore Ngamwongwan	With Perfect 10 Liners Cast	
Perfect 10 Liners Fan Meeting in Japan	May 24, 2025	Ebisu The Garden Hall	With Perfect 10 Liners Cast	
Perfect 10 Liners Fan Meeting in Manila	August 23, 2025	Samsung Hall, SM Aura Premier	With Perfect 10 Liners Cast	
Perfect 10 Liners Fan Meeting in Vietnam	October 11, 2025	District 10 Cultural Center	With Perfect 10 Liners Cast	
GMMTV Fan Day 27 in Tokyo	December 13, 2025	Nissho Hall	With Mark	
My Romance Scammer: Love at First Scam	February 1, 2026	6th Fl. Siam Paragon - Siam Pavalai, Paragon Cineplex	With My Romance Scammer Cast	
GMMTV Fanival 2026	March 20, 2026	CentralWorld Pulse, 7th Fl.	With Mark	
JuniorMark Fan Meeting in Taipei	March 29, 2026	WESTAR	With Mark	
Across the Sky to You: Junior & Jummo Fan Meeting in Shanghai	April 11, 2026	Shanghai	—N/a	
My Romance Scammer Final EP. Fan Meeting	April 19, 2026	MCC Hall, floor 3, The Mall Lifestore Bangkae	With My Romance Scammer Cast	
WeTV x My Romance Scammer	April 29, 2026	Union Mall, Union Co-Event Studio, 5th Fl.	With My Romance Scammer Cast	
GMMTV International Novel Festival 2026	July 26, 2026	Samyan Mitrtown, 5th Fl.	With Mark	
JuniorMark Fan Meeting in Singapore	September 19, 2026	D’marquee, Downtown East	With Mark	
GMMTV Fan Day 36 in Tokyo	October 3, 2026	New Pier Hall	With Mark	
GMMTV Fanival: Happy Family	October 8, 2026	Union Hall, Union Mall	With Mark	
JuniorMark Fan Meeting in Manila	November 14, 2026	Music Museum	With Mark	

== Concerts ==
Year	Title	Date(s)	Venue	Artist(s)	Ref.
2025	JuniorMark Shine Rise Fancon	August 11, 2025	Union Hall, Union Mall	With Mark, Great, Serious Bacon	
2025	JuniorMark Shine Rise Fancon	August 12, 2025	Union Hall, Union Mall	With Mark, Sing, Jan, Force, Book	
2025	JimmySea Dreamscape Fancon	November 30, 2025	The Theatre at Mediacorp	With Jimmy, Sea, Book, Tay, Gawin	
2026	ForceBook Funtopia Fancon	April 4, 2026	Union Hall, Union Mall	With Force, Book, Jimmy, Joss, Gawin	
2026	Love Out Loud Fan Fest 2026: Heart Race	May 22–24, 2026	Impact Arena, Muang Thong Thani	With Mark, Earth, Mix, Boun, Prem, Pond, Phuwin, Force, Book, Joong, Dunk, Jimmy, Sea, First, Khaotung, Gemini, Fourth, Perth, Santa, William, Est, Joss, Gawin	
2026	PerthSanta Devil's Kiss Concert	July 19, 2026	Paragon Hall	With Perth, Santa, Off, Force	
2026	JuniorMark Sunny Moon Concert	August 7, 2026	BITEC LIVE	With Mark, Leo, Poon, Aun, Save	
2026	JuniorMark Sunny Moon Concert	August 8, 2026	BITEC LIVE	With Mark, Emi, Bonnie, Pahn, Fond	
2026	JuniorMark Sunny Moon Concert	August 9, 2026	BITEC LIVE	With Mark, Film, Tay, Prem, Nani	
2026	JuniorMark Sunny Moon Fancon in Macau	December 19–20, 2026	Broadway Theatre, Broadway Macau	With Mark	

== Awards and nominations ==
Award nominations for Panachai Sriariyarungruang
Year	Award	Category	Nominee(s)	Result	Ref.
2024	Thailand Y Content Awards	Best Series	Perfect 10 Liners	Won	
