= My Bromance =

2014 Thai film

- Theatrical release poster
- Directed by: Nitchapoom Chaianun
- Produced by: Navaraj Kanagaraj; Nantuchaporn Samerpong
- Starring: Teerapat Lohanan; Pongsatorn Sripinta.
- Music by: Piyatut Hemstapat; Bill Piyatut H. Harmonica Sunrise
- Production company: Navaraj Studio
- Distributed by: WayuFilm
- Release date: 20 February 2014 (Thailand)
- Running time: 118 minutes
- Country: Thailand
- Language: Thai
- Box office: $102,015

My Bromance (Thai: พี่ชาย My Bromance RTGS: Phi Chai My Bromance) is a 2014 Thai drama film starring Teerapat Lohanan and Pongsatorn Sripinta, and directed by Nitchapoom Chaianun. Filmed primarily in Chiang Mai, Thailand, it premiered on February 20, 2014. The film was adapted into a television series of the same name. The first season premiered in 2016 for 12 episodes and the second season titled My Bromance: 5 Years Later aired in 2021 for nine episodes.

== Plot ==
Golf (played by Teerapat Lohanan) whom is referred by his friends as aggressive, hot-tempered, a playboy and foul-mouth 18-year-old high school student. He comes from a broken family, often living in the semi-detached home alone, often depriving the love and attention from his father, but the latter showered him with money.

One day, Golf was thrown in a ruthless world of family politics when Golf's father brought a woman (Thara) and Bank (played by Pongsatorn Sripinta) home, confused as it is, Golf slowly learns that, that Thara would be his new step-mother, and also had to learn that he has a step-brother who is just 4 months his junior. Golf, who has never been an older brother and doesn't wish to have a younger brother was forced to accept the sudden change with new additions in the family. Golf began to ostracized Bank when he tries to make contact with the new older brother.

Soon after, initially belonging to another class, Bank asked the school principal to transfer him to Golf's class to be close to him, Golf's chanced the opportunity on Bank by bullying him. as he hates to see him, taking any opportunity that comes his way, resulting dampening the relationship with his friends (especially Jieb). And the concerned group of classmates of theirs stepped in, making Golf's in realizing what he did to Bank was wrong, When the jealous Golf discovers that Bank who is willing to do anything and everything for his older brother. Bank's actions slowly earn and won the respect of Golf, and slowly accepts him as brother. However, love starts to dazzle and blossom in the two unknown brothers.

Things gets sticky when Thom (played by Withawat Thaokhamlue) a popular school singer tries his ways to woo Bank, by sending him lunchbox, flowers and snacks. Also, he went as far as to buying Bank's contact number from Bank's classmate and friend (Tar), knowing his family is poor. Affected by what Golf's saw in his own eyes, that Bank communicated with Thom, he turned jealous, and started a heated argument with Bank, and end up forcing Bank to confess his true feelings for his older brother. Golf later confessed his true feelings too and in return, gave Bank a couple ring which Bank wanted to buy earlier on.

Things does not look so good as it seems, apart from having the approval by their classmates (Jieb, Paan, Tar and Tued), the duo relationship start to crack when Golf's aunt suspected and eventually caught the audacious act by the two step-brothers laying on top of each other as they return home from a trip. Horrified and notified by the action, Golf's father called for a family meeting and eventually sent Golf to America to study, in hopes that the two brother's relationship will break, leaving both boys sad and withered like flowers.

Six months has passed, Golf returned home, a happy Bank was shocked and couldn't accept that his older brother has a new girlfriend (Kaem) whom they knew in America, and to make matters worst, Golf is about to get engaged to Kaem, leaving a heart-broken Bank to date Thom, however Bank's steadfast love for Golf did not change. Being confronted by Golf's firm love to Bank and in the state of a heated argument proving who loves who, both brothers was involved in a car accident leaving the two brothers seriously injured.

A shocked Golf slowly understands that his brother life was left hanging when the doctors had to remove one of his kidneys, and the latter's health did not improve, as Bank's other kidney did not function properly, a sad Golf decides to donate his kidney to Bank, with several disapproval from his father. After pleading, Golf eventually donates his kidney to his younger brother, a pact they have done before that none of the brothers will leave each other.

Fast forward to one year later, during Bank's 19th birthday, unbeknownst to Bank about his brother Golf's death. Bank unwraps the last present and a letter given to him, but was left in tears when he learnt that his brother had died of a brain tumor (a condition that was discovered after the duo had the car accident), and the truth that Golf has donated one of the kidneys to Bank, telling him his love to his younger brother, leaving Bank even more distraught.

As Bank visited Golf's grave, he thanked the older brother and offered the ring to him, with his finger wearing one, proving Bank's everlasting and steadfast love to his brother. To a boy who has suffered so much, Bank took on his brother legacy by doing what he likes most, painting and collecting plastic toy fixtures. (To the viewers, it was shown that Bank's mother had born a son). And Bank fully understands and is able to with-hold the love of his older brother, Bank later affirmed the love of his brother by visiting a bridge area which the brothers frequently visited.

== Cast ==
=== Main ===
Character	Portrayed by	Remarks
Kanthitat Atsawametanon	Teerapat Lohanan	Better known as Golf; Vut's Biological son Thara's older step-son Bank's older step-brother Bank's love interest Thom's love rival Kaem's unmarried fiancé Born on 1 August 1994; Deceased on 9 May 2013; Being referred as a playboy, likes playing truant, bad tempered, a person who doesn't reflect own words and easily jealous Died of brain tumor Donated kidney to Bank; Ended up being with Bank (although he has died); In Grade 11 Class 1
Baworananan	Pongsatorn Sripinta	Better known as Bank; Thara's Biological son Vut's younger step-son Golf's younger step-brother Golf's love interest Thom's love interest Kaem's love rival Born in December 1994/January 1995. Being referred as a sweet natured, gentle and considerate Recipient of Golf's kidney Ended up being with Golf (although Golf has died); In Grade 11 Class 1

=== Supporting ===
Character	Portrayed by	Remarks
Thom	Withawat Thaokhamlue	Golf's love rival Bank's love interest Jieb's super fan School Boy-Band Member
Vut	—N/a	Golf's biological father Mai's brother Married Bank's Mother Thara; Bank's step-father Works in a plastic toy company. Father of a later born child
Mai	—N/a	Golf's Aunt; Vut's Sister; A Divorcee
Thara	Phantphin T Chiangmai	Also known as Tara; Bank's Biological Mother; Golf's step-mother An ex-widow Married Golf's Father; Had a baby in the end
Tar	Worakamon Nokkaew	Bank and Golf's classmate Paan's love interest Pann's boyfriend In Grade 11 Class 1
Jieb	Wachiraporn Attawut	Bank and Golf's classmate Thom's admirer In Grade 11 Class 1
Paan	Varatchaya Comemamoon	Bank and Golf's classmate Tar's love interest Tar's girlfriend In Grade 11 Class 1
Tued	Naradon Namboonjit	Bank and Golf's classmate In Grade 11 Class 1
Mr Nikom	—N/a	Grade 11 Class 1 Form Teacher; Golf, Bank, Jieb, Tar, Paan and Tued Form Teacher
Sutthisanan	—N/a	Also known as Kaem; Golf's unmarried fiancée Bank's love rival Did not marry Golf in the end
