= Until We Meet Again (TV series) =

2019 Thai television series

- Official series poster
- Thai: ด้ายแดง
- Genre: Boys' love
- Based on: The Red Thread by LazySheep
- Directed by: Siwaj Sawatmaneekul
- Starring: Natouch Siripongthon; Thitiwat Ritprasert; Katsamonnat Namwirote; Noppakao Dechaphatthanakun; Warut Chawalitrujiwong; Noppanut Guntachai; Samantha Melanie Coates
- Opening theme: I Found You by Dome Jaruwat
- Country of origin: Thailand
- Original language: Thai
- No. of episodes: 17

Production
- Production location: Thailand
- Running time: 45 minutes
- Production companies: Studio Wabi Sabi Co., Ltd.

Original release
- Network: Line TV; YouTube
- Release: 9 November 2019 – 1 March 2020

Related
- Between Us (2021)

Until We Meet Again (Thai: ด้ายแดง; RTGS: Dai daeng; lit. The Red Thread) is a 2019 Thai boys' love television series starring Natouch Siripongthon (nicknamed Fluke) and Thitiwat Ritprasert (nicknamed Ohm). The series, directed by Siwaj Sawatmaneekul (nicknamed New), premiered in Thailand and aired from November 9, 2019, to March 1, 2020, with repeats on LINE TV. The series is based on the novel The Red Thread (Thai: ด้ายแดง) authored under the pseudonym ‘LazySheep’ and published by Hermit Books in 2018. The story is about two modern-day college students who discover that they are the reincarnated souls of two past lovers who had committed suicide.

The series garnered international attention specifically in Southeast Asia and Latin America. On May 7, 2020, director New Siwaj Sawatmaneekul and author LazySheep confirmed that there will be a new series based on the side story for the characters Win and Team called Between Us.

== Synopsis ==
Thirty years prior to the main events, Korn and Intouch were university students in Bangkok. Intouch became involved with Korn despite Korn's status as the son of a prominent mafia don in Bangkok. Although Korn initially rejected Intouch, the two eventually entered into a romantic relationship.

Their relationship was opposed by their families and was affected by the social attitudes toward homosexuality at the time. As tensions surrounding the relationship increased, Korn ultimately ended their relationship, despite Intouch's efforts to maintain it. The conflict culminated in the couple taking their own lives.

In the present day, 19-year old Pharm recently returned to Thailand. He is a university freshman who has an unexplained feeling of waiting for someone since childhood. He has recurring nightmares, a fear of loud noises, and a birthmark on his temple. Dean is 21 years old and the third-year swimming club president at the same university. He spent his life searching for people whose faces he cannot remember.

Pharm and Dean develop a relationship. The series uses the “red thread of fate” as a narrative motif to connect Pharm and Dean with Korn and Intouch, their counterparts from a previous life.

== Cast and characters ==
=== Main ===
- Natouch Siripongthon (Fluke) as Pharm

a 19 year old freshman in college and an aspiring chef. He is the reincarnation of Intouch. He was reincarnated into Korn's family, Korn being his paternal uncle.

- Thitiwat Ritprasert (Ohm) as Dean

a third-year and the president of the swimming club. He is the reincarnation of Korn. He was reincarnated into Intouch's family, his mother is Intouch's niece and his grandmother is In's older sister.

- Katsamonnat Namwirote (Earth) as Intouch

Pharm's past self. He remains optimistic about his relationship with Korn even though he knows he is unhappy.

- Noppakao Dechaphatthanakun (Kao) as Korn

Dean's past self. His father is an important figure in the mafia, who expects Korn, the oldest, to take his place, despite Korn being against his father's work.

=== Supporting ===
- Warut Chawalitrujiwong (Prem) as Team

Pharm's best friend and a member of the swimming club. He is often teased by Win, who he soon grows feelings for.

- Noppanut Guntachai (Boun) as Win

Dean's best friend and a member of the swimming club. He enjoys playing with Team, whom he has a crush on.

- Samantha Melanie Coates (Sammy) as Manaow

Pharm's and Team's best friend and a member of the drama club along with Del. She later dates Pruk.

- Supadach Wilairat (Boston) as Pruk

a handsome swim club member and Manaow's love interest.

- Pannin Charnmanoon (Pineare) as Del, Dean's and Don's younger sister.
- Wanut Sangtianprapai (Mix) as Don,

Dean's younger brother and Del's older brother.

- Phachara Suansri (Ja) as Sin

Pharm's cousin. He assists Dean in researching more about Korn and In.

- Naphat Vikairungroj (Na) as Sorn

Dean's friend and Sin's boyfriend.

- Songsit Roongnophakunsri as Mr. Wongnate

Dean's father.

- Sinjai Plengpanich as Alin

Dean's mother and Intouch's niece.

- Tarika Thidathit as An

In's older sister and Dean's grandmother.

- Savitree Suttichanond (Beau) as adult An
- Ploy Sornarin as young An.
- Nirut Sirijanya as Mr. Ariyasakul

Korn's father.

- Phollawat Manuprasert as Krit

Korn's brother, Sin's father and Pharm's uncle.

- Kirati Puangmalee (Title) as young Krit.
- Phiravich Attachitsataporn (Mean) as Alex

a bisexual guy and the president of the Drama club, who makes a bunch of attempts to flirt with Pharm.

- Surat Permpoonsavat (Yacht) as Mew

a swimming club member.

=== Guest ===
- Saranwut Chatjaratsaeng (Ball) as Phoom, Pharm's younger brother.
- Tanapon Sukumpantanasan (Perth) as In's best friend.
- Vittawin Veeravidhayanant (Best) as Dej, a cooking club member.
- Rathavit Kijworalak (Plan) as one of Dean's business faculty friends.
- Napat na Ranong (Gun) as another one of Dean's friends.

== Soundtrack ==
Song title	Artist
"I Found You"	Dome Jaruwat
"Until We Meet Again"	Boy Sompob
"Until We Meet Again" (English version)	Boy Sompob
"Until We Meet Again"	Namcha
"Luckiest Boy"	The cast of UWMA
"Luckiest Boy"	Boy Sompob
"Luckiest Boy" (English version)	Boy Sompob
"Or We Have Met"	Noppanut Guntachai (Boun)
"I Want To Tell You" [Official MV]	Samantha Melanie Coates
"Still Have Me"	Catnap
"From This Day Forward"	Arunpong Chaiwinit
"We’ll Always Meet Again"	Natouch Siripongthon (Fluke) & Thitiwat Ritprasert (Ohm)

== Release ==
The series was released on DVD in November 2020. It was made available on the Rakuten Viki platform.

== Reception ==
The series gained a certain popularity in the Philippines. The presence of queer themes in the series has been noted.
