= Jiruntanin Trairattanayon =

Thai actor (born 1997)

- จิรันธนิน ตรัยรัตนยนต์
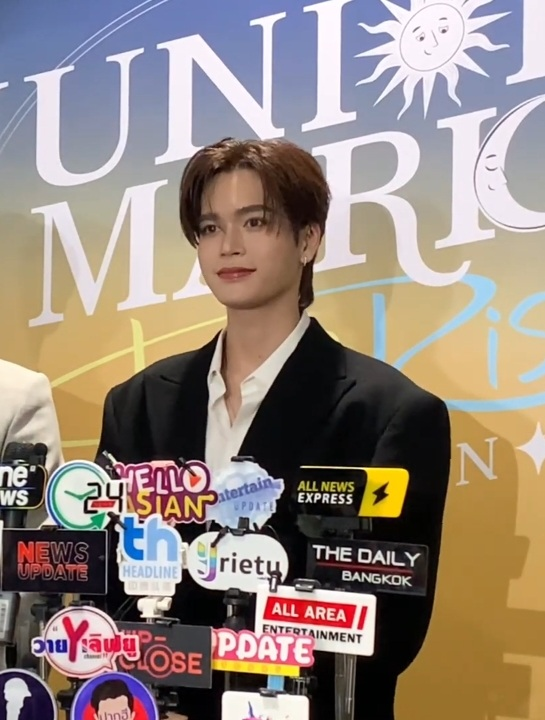
- Jiruntanin in August 2025
- Born: 15 June 1997 (age 29); Bangkok, Thailand
- Other name: Mark (มาร์ค)
- Education: Sarasas Witaed Saimai School; Sirindhorn International Institute of Technology, Thammasat University
- Occupations: Actor; singer
- Years active: 2022–present
- Agent: GMMTV
- Known for: Prince in Star & Sky; Min in Cherry Magic; Wine in Perfect 10 Liners; Pai in My Romance Scammer
- Height: 1.8 m (5 ft 11 in)

Jiruntanin Trairattanayon (Thai: จิรันธนิน ตรัยรัตนยนต์; born 15 June 1997), nicknamed Mark (Thai: มาร์ค), is a Thai actor known for his roles in Cherry Magic (2023), Perfect 10 Liners (2024) and My Romance Scammer (2026).

== Early life and education ==
Jiruntanin was born in Bangkok, Thailand and attended Sarasas Witaed Saimai School before studying at Sirindhorn International Institute of Technology for a bachelor’s degree in industrial engineering. Prior to signing with GMMTV, Jiruntanin ran the YouTube channel MARKMEAN alongside Vorrapath Jitpaisarnwattana (Mean).

== Career ==
In 2022, Jiruntanin signed as an artist with GMMTV and made his television acting debut as a supporting character in the first installment of the duology series Star & Sky, becoming a main lead in the second part of the series. He gained widespread recognition for his role as Wine in the 2024 television series Perfect 10 Liners.

== Filmography ==
=== Television series ===
Key
†	Denotes television productions that have not yet been released

Year	Title	Role	Network	Notes	Ref.
2022	Star & Sky: Star in My Mind	"Prince" Na Chiang Dao	GMM 25	Supporting role	
2022	Star & Sky: Sky in Your Heart	"Prince" Na Chiang Dao	GMM 25	Main role	
2023	Midnight Museum	Phone	GMM 25	Guest role	
2023	Cherry Magic	Min	GMM 25	Supporting role	
2024	High School Frenemy	Cable	GMM 25	Supporting role	
2024	Perfect 10 Liners	"Wine" Witsawa	GMM 25	Main role	
2025	Revamp The Undead Story	"Methus" Methuselah Soleil	GMM 25	Supporting role	
2025	Melody of Secrets	Phleng	One 31	Guest role	
2026	My Romance Scammer	"Pai" Jirachot Jiramongkolthanun	GMM 25	Main role	
2026	Peach and Me	Himself	GMM 25	Guest role	
TBA	Twenty One †	Koon	TBA	Main role	
TBA	Boys 4 Moms †	Srinam	TBA	Main role	

== Discography ==
=== Singles ===
==== Collaborations ====
Year	Title	Label	Ref.
2025	"อย่าน่ารักเกิน (Cutie Overload)" with Junior	GMMTV Records	
2026	"Love Feels So Fast" with Junior, Earth, Mix, Boun, Prem, Pond, Phuwin, Force, Book, Joong, Dunk, Jimmy, Sea, First, Khaotung, Gemini, Fourth, Perth, Santa, William, Est, Joss, Gawin	GMMTV Records	

==== Soundtrack appearances ====
Year	Title	Album	Label	Ref.
2024	"วันนี้ (Perfect)" with Junior Panachai, Force Jiratchapong, Book Kasidet, Perth Tanapon, Santa Pongsapak	Perfect 10 Liners OST	GMMTV Records	
2024	"ทดลองรัก (Trial Love)" with Junior Panachai	Perfect 10 Liners OST	GMMTV Records	
2026	"วางใจ (Trust Me)" with Junior Panachai	My Romance Scammer OST	GMMTV Records	

== Fan meetings ==
Title	Date	Venue	Notes	Ref.
Star in My Mind Final EP. Fan Meeting	May 27, 2022	Siam Pavalai Royal Grand Theater, Siam Paragon	With Star in My Mind Cast	
Perfect 10 Liners: First Date	October 27, 2024	Siam Pavalai Theatre, Paragon Cineplex	With Perfect 10 Liners Cast	
GMMTV Fan Day 20 in Taipei	March 7, 2025	WESTAR	With Junior	
Perfect 10 Liners: Bye Nior Fan Party	April 6, 2025	MCC Hall 4th Fl. The Mall Lifestore Ngamwongwan	With Perfect 10 Liners Cast	
Perfect 10 Liners: Bye Nior After Party	April 7, 2025	MCC Hall 4th Fl. The Mall Lifestore Ngamwongwan	With Perfect 10 Liners Cast	
Perfect 10 Liners Fan Meeting in Japan	May 24, 2025	Ebisu The Garden Hall	With Perfect 10 Liners Cast	
Perfect 10 Liners Fan Meeting in Manila	August 23, 2025	Samsung Hall, SM Aura Premier	With Perfect 10 Liners Cast	
Perfect 10 Liners Fan Meeting in Vietnam	October 11, 2025	District 10 Cultural Center	With Perfect 10 Liners Cast	
Revamp The Undead Story Final EP. Fan Meeting	October 25, 2025	6th Fl. Siam Paragon - Siam Pavalai, Paragon Cineplex	With Revamp The Undead Story Cast	
GMMTV Fan Day 27 in Tokyo	December 13, 2025	Nissho Hall	With Junior	
My Romance Scammer: Love at First Scam	February 1, 2026	6th Fl. Siam Paragon - Siam Pavalai, Paragon Cineplex	With My Romance Scammer Cast	
GMMTV Fanival 2026	March 20, 2026	CentralWorld Pulse, 7th Fl.	With Junior	
JuniorMark Fan Meeting in Taipei	March 29, 2026	WESTAR	With Junior	
Across the Sky to You: Mark & Jummo Fan Meeting in Shanghai	April 12, 2026	Shanghai	—N/a	
My Romance Scammer Final EP. Fan Meeting	April 19, 2026	MCC Hall, floor 3, The Mall Lifestore Bangkae	With My Romance Scammer Cast	
WeTV x My Romance Scammer	April 29, 2026	Union Mall, Union Co-Event Studio, 5th Fl.	With My Romance Scammer Cast	
GMMTV International Novel Festival 2026	July 26, 2026	Samyan Mitrtown, 5th Fl.	With Junior	
JuniorMark Fan Meeting in Singapore	September 19, 2026	D’marquee, Downtown East	With Junior	
GMMTV Fan Day 36 in Tokyo	October 3, 2026	New Pier Hall	With Junior	
GMMTV Fanival: Happy Family	October 8, 2026	Union Hall, Union Mall	With Junior	
JuniorMark Fan Meeting in Manila	November 14, 2026	Music Museum	With Junior	

== Concerts ==
Year	Title	Date(s)	Venue	Artist(s)	Ref.
2025	JuniorMark Shine Rise Fancon	August 11, 2025	Union Hall, Union Mall	With Junior, Great, Serious Bacon	
2025	JuniorMark Shine Rise Fancon	August 12, 2025	Union Hall, Union Mall	With Junior, Sing, Jan, Force, Book	
2026	Love Out Loud Fan Fest 2026: Heart Race	May 22–24, 2026	Impact Arena, Muang Thong Thani	With Junior, Earth, Mix, Boun, Prem, Pond, Phuwin, Force, Book, Joong, Dunk, Jimmy, Sea, First, Khaotung, Gemini, Fourth, Perth, Santa, William, Est, Joss, Gawin	
2026	JuniorMark Sunny Moon Concert	August 7, 2026	BITEC LIVE	With Junior, Poon, Aun, Save, Leo	
2026	JuniorMark Sunny Moon Concert	August 8, 2026	BITEC LIVE	With Junior, Pahn, Fond, Emi, Bonnie	
2026	JuniorMark Sunny Moon Concert	August 9, 2026	BITEC LIVE	With Junior, Prem, Nani, Film, Tay	
2026	JuniorMark Sunny Moon Fancon in Macau	December 19–20, 2026	Broadway Theatre, Broadway Macau	With Junior	

== Awards and nominations ==
Award nominations for Jiruntanin Trairattanayon
Year	Award	Category	Nominee(s)	Result	Ref.
2024	Thailand Y Content Awards	Best Series	Perfect 10 Liners	Won	
