= Phiravich Attachitsataporn =

Thai actor and model (born 1998)

- พีรวิชญ์ อรรถชิตสถาพร
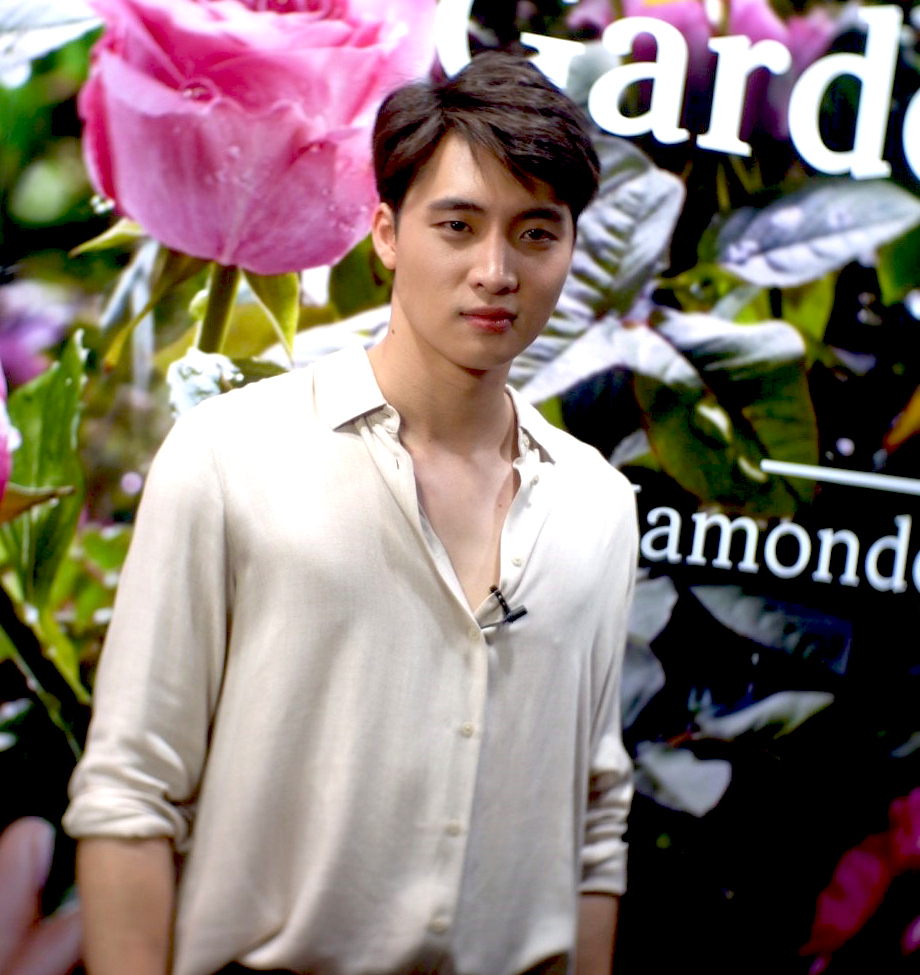
- Phiravich at a Mamonde event in October 2018
- Born: 5 March 1998 (age 28); Chachoengsao, Thailand
- Other names: Mean; M34N; Nong
- Education: Thammasat University Journalism and Mass Comm.
- Occupations: Actor; MC; YouTuber
- Years active: 2015–present
- Agent: Channel 3 (2020–present)
- Known for: Tin in Love by Chance
- Height: 180 cm (5 ft 11 in)

Phiravich Attachitsataporn (Thai: พีรวิชญ์ อรรถชิตสถาพร; born 5 March 1998), nicknamed Mean (Thai: มีน) is a Thai television actor, director. He is best known for his role as Tin in the 2018 Thai television drama Love by Chance. He featured with main roles in movies such as Blood Valentine (2019), and Pee Nak 2 (2020). He also had a lead role in a series My Bubble Tea, Win 21 Ded Jai Tur, and The Graduates (2020).

== Early life and education ==
Phiravich Attachitsataporn was born on 5 March 1998 in Chachoengsao, Thailand. He was once the president of the youth in his hometown, Chachoengsao. At the time of its management, its members were only 20-30 members. He graduated Faculty of journalism and Mass communication from Thammasat University.

== Career ==
Mean made his acting debut with a guest role in the Thai BL series Love Sick: The Series Season 2 (2015) in 2015, a talent-searching and reality TV programme produced by Channel 9.

In 2016, he then starred supporting role as Tonson in the Thai drama series I Love The Fat Guy 2 (2016) and Make It Right: The Series (2016) where he played the role as Champ.

Mean rose to fame with his role as Tin in the 2018 Thai BL drama series Love by Chance which aired on LINE TV and GMM 25 on August 3, 2018. In November it was announced that Mean was cast in the Mono29 movie Blood Valentine playing a police officer. On July 29, Mean's Mono29 movie, Touchdown Kiss, where he plays as Quentin will be released.

Mean made his directorial debut with the series The Yearbook which was adapted from the short film school project "The Yearbook" written by him. The executive producer of the series is Witwisit Hiranyawongkul.

== Discography ==
=== Songs ===
Year	Song Title	English Title	Note
2019	เพิ่งได้รู้	Just know	Kissboys TH single
2019	ดีต่อใจ	Good to heart	Kissboys TH single

== Filmography ==
=== Movie ===
Year	Title	Role	Notes	Ref.
2015	Water Boyy: The Movie	Classmate	Guest	
2019	Touchdown Kiss	Quentin	Main Role	
2019	Blood Valentine	Sun	Main Role	
2020	Pee Nak 2	Tho	Main Role	
2020	Please (Her)	Deaw	Main Role	
2022	Breaking the 4th Wall	Forth	Main Role	
2022	Pee Nak 3	Tho	Main Role	
2022	The Cleaner	Way	Main Role	
2022	The Yearbook (Movie)	Sarut	Guest Director	
2022	The Antique Shop	{Happy birthday} Champ	Main Role	
2024	Death Whisperer 2	Pradit	Support Role	
2025	Tharae The Exorcist	Sopha	Support Role	

=== Television series ===
Year	Title	Role	Network	Notes	Ref.
2015	Love Sick: The Series Season 2	Student	Channel 9	Cameo (Ep 4,10)	
2016	I Love The Fat Guy 2	Tonson	NOW26	Support Role	
2016	Make It Right: The Series	Champ	Channel 9	Support Role	
2017	That time.. Not forget	Porsche	Channel 3 SD	Main Role	
2018	Love by Chance The Series	Tin	GMM 25		
2018	Beauty Boy: The Series		Channel 3	Cameo	
2019	REMINDERS	Two	Line TV	Main Role	
2019	Touchdown kiss	Quentin	Mono 29		
2019	Make It Live: On The Beach	Champ	LINE TV	Cameo (Ep 6)	
2019	TharnType	Tin	ONE 31	Cameo	
2019	Until We Meet Again	Alex	LINE TV	Support Role	
2020	My Bubble Tea	Light	ViuTV, ONE 31	Main Role	
2020	Win 21 Ded Jai Tur	Phira	LINE TV	Cameo (Ep 14)	
2020	Hook	Saifah	GMM 25	Main Role	
2020	Love By Chance 2	Tin	We TV	Main Role	
2020	Saneha StoriesSS3	Fuse	Ais Play	Main Role	
2020	The Graduates	Ohm	LINE TV	Main Role	
2021	Sweet Secret	Kraeng		Main Role	
2021	The Yearbook	Sarut	LINE TV	Cameo Directorial Debut	
2022	My Sweet Assassin	Phop	Channel 3	Support Role	
2022	Suptar 2550	Taro	Channel 3	Support Role	
2022	Remember Me	Itthipat Kanjarouk (Nak-Naen)	Amarin TV	Main Role Director	
2023	Krong Dok Sroi		Channel 3	Main Role Director	Support Role
2024	Love at First Night	Tin		Support Role	
2024	The Believers	Cameo	Netflix	Guest	

=== Music video ===
Year	Song Title	English Title	Singer
2015	ไม่อยากสนิทกับความเหงา	Don't want to be close to loneliness.	Praew Kanitkul
2016	จูบปาก	Kiss	Fellow Fellow
2018	ไม่ว่าอะไร	Wish this love	Dew Arunpong
2018	หวัง	Hope	Rose Sirintip
2018	ขอ	Wish	Boy Sompob
2018	กระแสน้ำตา	Tears	Kunlamas Limpawutwaranon
2019	ใครมีแฟนออกจากแก๊งเราไป	BYE	Hi-U

=== Stage play ===
Year	Title	Role	Place	Date
2019	Who is the real murderer?	Phum	Art Center @Thailand. Prof. Dr.Saroj Buasri Innovation Building, Srinakharinwirot University	8 June 2019

=== Concert ===
- Kissboys TH The Final Concert (8 September 2019)
- Channel 3 Super Fan Live!: SUPERNOVA Universe Explosion Concert

=== Variety shows ===
Year	Title	Type	Network	Air time
2019	Kissboys Thailand	Reality Show	9 MCOT HD FB Kissboys TH	13 July 2019 – 7 September 2019

=== MC ===
Television

- 2022: ซุปตาร์เวลานอก by สีสันบันเทิง On Air 3HD33 (รับเชิญเทปวันที่ 5,6 มีนาคม) ร่วมกับ Mil Sarut Nawapraditkul

Online

- 2021: คิดถึงไก่หมายยย EP.1 On Air YouTube:MEAN PHIRAVICH OFFICIAL

== Awards and nominations ==
Year	Award	Category	Nominated work	Result	Ref.
2021	17th Kom Chad Luek Award	Best Supporting Actor (Film)	Von	Won	
