= Tinnasit Isarapongporn =

Thai actor and singer (born 2004)

- ตฤณสิษฐ์ อิสระพงศ์พร
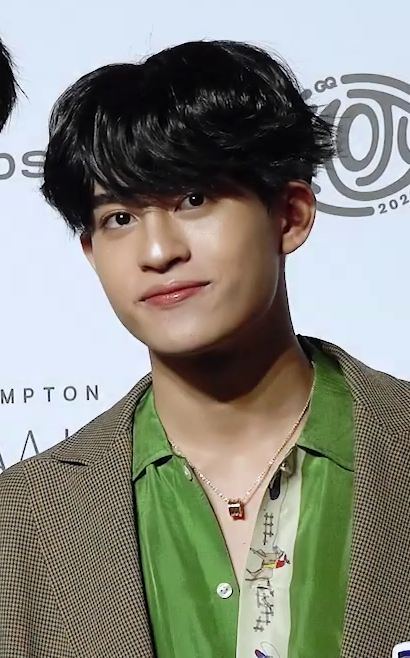
- Tinnasit in November 2022
- Born: 4 August 2004 (age 22); Bangkok, Thailand
- Other name: Barcode (บาร์โค้ด)
- Education: Suankularb College; Chulalongkorn University
- Occupations: Actor; Singer
- Years active: 2022–present
- Agent: Be On Cloud (2022-2024) GMMTV (2024-present)
- Known for: Porchay in KinnPorsche; Non in Dead Friend Forever; Ciar in Revamp The Undead Story
- Height: 1.80 m (5 ft 11 in)
- Relatives: Ploypapas Isarapongporn
- Musical career
- Genre: Thai pop
- Instrument: Vocals
- Years active: 2022–present
- Label: Riser Music
- Member of: Clo'ver

Tinnasit Isarapongporn (Thai: ตฤณสิษฐ์ อิสระพงศ์พร; born 4 August 2004), nicknamed Barcode (Thai: บาร์โค้ด), is a Thai actor and singer-songwriter. He first gained widespread recognition for his role as Porchay in the 2022 television series KinnPorsche.

In addition to his acting career, Tinnasit is a member of the T-pop boy group Clo'ver, formed by Riser Music. The group debuted on 27 November 2025, with the digital single "คนคุ้นคอย (Next To You)".

== Early life and education ==
Tinnasit was born in Bangkok, Thailand and is the younger brother of actress Ploypapas Isarapongporn. He went on to study at Chulalongkorn University's Faculty of Communication Arts after graduating from Suankularb College in February 2023.

== Career ==
In 2022, Tinnasit made his acting debut in the series KinnPorsche and was managed by Be On Cloud until April 2024. After a short period with Aplan International from May to September of that same year, he joined GMMTV later that December. In October 2024, he launched his own label: Taintis Studio. In November 2025, he was revealed as a member of the T-pop boy group Clo'ver, managed under Riser Music.

== Filmography ==
=== Television series ===
Key
†	Denotes television productions that have not yet been released

Year	Title	Role	Notes	Network	Ref.
2022	KinnPorsche	"Chay" Porchay Kittisawasd	Supporting role	One 31	
2023	Dead Friend Forever	"Non" Thanakorn Prathipsit	Main role	iQIYI	
2024	Good Doctor Thailand	Earth	Guest role (Ep. 7)	True ID	
2025	Revamp The Undead Story	"Ciar" Ciarán Soleil	Supporting role	GMM 25	
2026	Wooju Bakery	U Ju	Main role	GagaOOLala	
2026	You Maniac	Ten	Supporting role	GMM 25	
TBA	Kiss Me, Remember? †	Pas	Main role	TBA	
TBA	Happy Ending †	Anawin	Main role	TBA	
TBA	High & Low: Born to Be High †	Euro	Supporting role	TBA	
TBA	Shrimply Mine †	Thak	Main role	TBA	

=== Appearances in music videos ===
Year	Title	Artist(s)	Label	Ref.
2022	"แค่เธอ (Why Don't You Stay)" KinnPorsche OST	Jeff Satur	Be On Cloud	
2022	"แค่เธอ (Why Don't You Stay)" World Tour version	Jeff Satur	Be On Cloud	
2025	"จองตั๋วแล้วจองตัวเธอด้วยได้ปะ (LOVE TICKET)"	Tay Tawan, Nanon Korapat, Gemini Norawit and Fourth Nattawat	GMMTV Records	

== Discography ==
=== Singles ===
Year	Title	Label	Notes	Ref.
2024	"หมาหวงก้าง (No Right)"	Taintis Studio	Independent release	
2024	"เขยิบเข้ามา (Move Your Body)"	Taintis Studio	Independent release	
2024	"Only Christmas"	Taintis Studio	Independent release	
2025	"คนคุ้นคอย (Next To You)"	Riser Music	Clo'ver 1st digital single	
2026	"Bad Boy No 'Do'"	Riser Music	Clo'ver 2nd digital single	
2026	"Lonely Girl"	Riser Music	Clo'ver 3rd digital single	
2026	"Think About You"	Riser Music	Clo'ver 4th digital single	

=== Covers (singles) ===
Year	Title	Label	Ref.
2025	"Knock Knock" with Chari Charisar and Sangt Sillapintr	Riser Music	
2026	"Trust Me" with Keen Suvijak	Riser Music	

=== Soundtracks ===
Year	Title	Soundtrack	Label	Ref.
2022	"เพลงนี้ชื่อว่าเธอ (This Song is Called You)"	KinnPorsche OST	Be On Cloud	
2023	"ไม่อยากจะฝันดี (No More Dream)"	Dead Friend Forever OST	Be On Cloud	
2025	"Lesson One"	Boys in Love OST	GMMTV Records	
2026	"รักกันได้ยัง (Approved?)" with Kin Thanachai	You Maniac OST	GMMTV Records	

== Fan meetings ==
Title	Date	Venue	Notes	Ref.
BFF Fan Meeting	April 24, 2024	Cinema 13, Major Cineplex Ratchayothin	With Ta, Copper	
Barcode Fan Meeting in Thailand	July 20, 2024	The Bazaar Theatre	—N/a	
Barcode Fan Meeting in Japan	August 8, 2024	Hokusen Theater	—N/a	
Barcode Fan Meeting in China	August 17, 2024	Nanning	—N/a	
Barcode Fan Meeting in Italy	August 31, 2024	Hotel NH Venezia Laguna Palace	—N/a	
GMMTV Fan Event in Tokyo	June 22, 2025	Animate Theatre	—N/a	
Revamp The Undead Story: First Premiere	August 23, 2025	6th Fl. Siam Paragon - Siam Pavalai, Paragon Cineplex	With Revamp The Undead Story Cast	
Revamp The Undead Story Final EP. Fan Meeting	October 25, 2025	6th Fl. Siam Paragon - Siam Pavalai, Paragon Cineplex	With Revamp The Undead Story Cast	
GMMTV Fanival 2026	April 1st, 2026	CentralWorld Pulse, 7th Fl.	With Clo'ver	
You Maniac: Opening Night	August 29, 2026	MCC Hall 3rd Fl. The Mall Lifestore Bangkapi	With You Maniac Cast	
Thailand Grand Festival 2026 in Sydney	September 19, 2026	Tumbalong Park, Darling Harbour	With Clo'ver	
Clo'ver Fan Sign in Sydney	September 19, 2026	City Recital Hall	With Clo'ver	
GMMTV Fanival: Happy Family	October 7, 2026	Union Hall, Union Mall	With Clo'ver	
GMMTV Fanival: Happy Family	October 11, 2026	Union Hall, Union Mall	With Kin	
You Maniac Final EP. Fan Meeting	October 31, 2026	Union Hall, Union Mall	With You Maniac Cast	

== Concerts ==
Title	Date	Venue	Notes	Ref.
KinnPorsche The Series: World Tour 2022-23	July 24–25, 2022	Impact Arena, Muang Thong Thani	With KinnPorsche Cast	
KinnPorsche The Series: World Tour 2022-23	October 8, 2022	The Star Theatre, Singapore	With KinnPorsche Cast	
KinnPorsche The Series: World Tour 2022-23	October 16, 2022	KBS Arena, Seoul	With KinnPorsche Cast	
KinnPorsche The Series: World Tour 2022-23	October 22, 2022	SM Mall of Asia, Manila	With KinnPorsche Cast	
KinnPorsche The Series: World Tour 2022-23	October 30, 2022	Taipei International Convention Center	With KinnPorsche Cast	
KinnPorsche The Series: World Tour 2022-23	February 25–26, 2023	Impact Arena, Muang Thong Thani	With KinnPorsche Cast	
GMMTV Musicon Japan	July 26–27, 2025	Toyosu PIT	With Krist, Gawin, Satang, Keen, LYKN, JASP.ER	
JossGawin Invincible Fancon	September 27, 2025	Mall Lifestore Bangkapi, Bangkok	With Joss, Gawin, Poon, Neo, Mond, Ryu, Satang, Ford	
GMMTV Starlympics 2025	December 20, 2025	Impact Arena, Muang Thong Thani	GMMTV Artists	
Riser Concert: The First Rise	February 13–15, 2026	Impact Arena, Muang Thong Thani	With Krist, Nanon, Win, Fourth, Gemini, Phuwin, Perth, LYKN, JASP.ER, Felizz, Clo'ver	
Clo'ver & Felizz T-Pop Showcase	May 3, 2026	Hanaspace, Taipei	With Felizz, Clo'ver	
Riser Music T-Pop Showcase 2026	May 8, 2026	Hokutopia Sakura Hall, Tokyo	With Krist, Nanon, Gawin, Felizz, Clo'ver	
26th Thai Festival in Tokyo	May 10, 2026	Yoyogi Park, Shibuya Ward	With Clo'ver, Sea, Krist, Singto	
GMMTV Musicon Singapore	May 30–31, 2026	Singapore Expo	With Krist, Nanon, Gawin, LYKN, JASP.ER, Felizz, Clo'ver	
Gotchapop Concert 4	June 6, 2026	Queen Sirikit National Convention Center	With Felizz, Clo'ver	
"มิตรTime" at Samyan Mitrtown Vol. 2	June 20, 2026	Samyan Mitrtown	With Felizz, Clo'ver	
SawasdeeSeoul Thai Festival 2026	June 21, 2026	Cheonggye Plaza, Seoul	With Clo'ver	
Monster Music Festival 2026	July 25, 2026	Queen Sirikit National Convention Center	With Felizz, Clo'ver	
Felizz & Clo'ver Happening Stage	August 5, 2026	One Bangkok Park	With Felizz, Clo'ver	
Nineentertain 24th Anniversary Charity Concert	September 30, 2026	Parc Paragon, Siam Paragon	With Krist, Almond, Progress, Jan, JingJing, Felizz, Clo'ver	
T-Pop Stage in Paris	October 3, 2026	Novotel Paris Est Centre de Conference	With Clo'ver	
Tout à fait Thaï 2026	October 4, 2026	Parc de Bagatelle	With Clo'ver, Sea	
GMMTV Starlympics 2026	November 28, 2026	Impact Arena, Muang Thong Thani	GMMTV Artists	

Upcoming

== Awards and nominations ==
Year	Event	Category	Nominated work	Result	Ref.
2022	YUniverse Awards	Best Cuties	—N/a	Nominated	
2022	TikTok Awards Thailand	Rising Star of the Year	—N/a	Won	
2022	MChoice Mint Awards	Breakthrough Cast of 2022	KinnPorsche	Won	
2023	Kazz Awards	Shining Star of the Year	—N/a	Won	
