= Dechchart Tasilp =

Thai actor (born 2005)

- เดชชาติ ทาศิลป์
- Born: 3 May 2005 (age 21); Thailand
- Other name: Sea (ซี)
- Education: King Mongkut's Institute of Technology Ladkrabang
- Occupation: Actor
- Years active: 2023–present
- Agents: Sol Entertainment (2022); GMMTV (2023–present)
- Known for: Kang in Only Boo!; Jerome / J in Head 2 Head; Cheewa in Weirdo-101
- Height: 1.83 m (6 ft 0 in)

Dechchart Tasilp (Thai: เดชชาติ ทาศิลป์; born 3 May 2005), nicknamed Sea (Thai: ซี), is a Thai actor signed under GMMTV. He is known for his roles in Only Boo! (2024), Head 2 Head (2025) and Weirdo-101 (2026).

== Early life and education ==
Dechchart was born in Thailand. He is currently studying at King Mongkut's Institute of Technology Ladkrabang.

== Career ==
In 2022, he filmed the pilot for the cancelled series Jump, alongside then-fellow Sol Entertainment artists Patchara Silapasoonthorn (Surf) and Phudtripart Bhudthonamochai (Ryu).

In 2023, Dechchart was announced to star in his breakthrough role in Only Boo! during the GMMTV 2024 Riding the Wave showcase event. He played the lead role of Kang, alongside Suvijak Piyanopharoj (Keen).

Following the humble success of the series Only Boo!, Dechchart established a prominent on-screen partnership with Suvijak, leading to consecutive joint projects. He went on to star in several series, including MuTeLuv and Head 2 Head.

In addition to his acting roles, Dechchart has also ventured into music by performing several official soundtracks (OSTs) for his series, often in collaboration with Suvijak.

He starred in the lead role as Cheewa in Weirdo-101 (2026).

== Filmography ==
=== Television series ===
Key
| † | Denotes television productions that have not yet been released |

| Year | Title | Role | Network | Notes | Ref. |
|---|---|---|---|---|---|
| 2024 | Only Boo! | "Kang" Pakorn Wongwiset | GMM25 | Main role | |
| 2025 | MuTeLuv: "Hi" By My Luck | Mawin Suthiraksa | GMM25 | Main role | |
| 2025 | Head 2 Head | "Jerome / J" Jirakan Methaves | GMM25 | Main role | |
| 2026 | Love You Teacher | Wayo | GMM25 | Guest role | |
| 2026 | Weirdo-101 | "Cheewa" Parncheewa | One 31 | Main role | |
| TBA | Starscope † | "Khet" Khopkhet | TBA | Main role | |
| TBA | High & Low: Born to Be High † | Tone | TBA | TBA | |

=== Music video appearances ===
| Year | Title | Artist(s) | Role | Ref. |
|---|---|---|---|---|
| 2024 | "แค่ที่แกง (Only Boo!)" | Keen Suvijak | Kang | |
| 2024 | "ดังกว่าเก่า (Louder)" | Keen Suvijak | Kang | |
| 2024 | "สถานีที่ศูนย์ (Station No.0)" | Keen Suvijak | Kang | |
| 2025 | "ไหนว่าไม่ชอบ (Not a Crush?)" | Keen Suvijak | Jerome | |

== Discography ==
=== Singles ===
==== Collaborations ====
| Year | Title | Label | Ref. |
|---|---|---|---|
| 2026 | "ยอมมะ (Will You?)" with Keen Suvijak | GMMTV Records | |

==== Soundtrack appearances ====
| Year | Title | Album | Label | Ref. |
|---|---|---|---|---|
| 2024 | "พี่(อย่า)แกง (Don't Be Fooled)" with Keen Suvijak | Only Boo! OST | GMMTV Records | |
| 2025 | "คิดว่าไม่ แต่ดันใช่ (Turns Out It's You)" with Keen Suvijak | Head 2 Head OST | GMMTV Records | |
| 2025 | "จริงๆ ชอบเธอ (Secret Crush?)" | Head 2 Head OST | GMMTV Records | |
| 2026 | "โน้ม (Gravity)" with Keen Suvijak | Weirdo-101 OST | GMMTV Records | |
| 2026 | "วอนขอดาว (Beside You)" with Keen Suvijak | Weirdo-101 OST | GMMTV Records | |

== Fan meetings ==
| Title | Date | Venue | Notes | Ref. |
|---|---|---|---|---|
| GMMTV Fan Event in Tokyo | 15 May 2024 | Animate Theatre | With Keen | |
| Only Boo! Final EP. Fan Meeting | 23 June 2024 | 9th Fl. Earthlab Cinema by Dr. CBD, SF World Cinema, Centralworld | With Only Boo! Cast | |
| SeaKeen Fan Meeting in Taipei | 17 August 2024 | Hanaspace | With Keen | |
| Head 2 Head: The First Round | 18 October 2025 | 9th Fl. Cinema 15, SF World Cinema, Centralworld | With Head 2 Head Cast | |
| Head 2 Head Final EP. Fan Meeting | 11 January 2026 | 6th Fl. Siam Paragon, Siam Pavalai, Paragon Cineplex | With Head 2 Head Cast | |
| Naiin Book Fair 2026 | 25th January 2026 | 5th Fl. Samyan Mitrtown | With Keen | |
| GMMTV Fanival 2026 | 6 April 2026 | 7th Fl. CentralWorld Pulse Hall, Centralworld | With Keen | |
| SeaKeen Fan Meeting in Thailand | 28 April 2026 | 3rd Fl. MCC Hall, The Mall Lifestore Bangkapi | With Keen | |
| SeaKeen 2nd Fan Meeting in Taipei | 3 May 2026 | Hanaspace | With Keen | |
| GMMTV International Novel Festival 2026 | 26 July 2026 | 5th Fl. Samyan Mitrtown | With Keen | |
| Weirdo-101: The First Gravity | 14 August 2026 | 7th Fl. Centralworld Pulse Hall, Centralworld | With Weirdo-101 Cast | |
| GMMTV Fan Day 34 in Sydney | 19 September 2026 | City Recital Hall | With Keen | |
| Thailand Grand Festival 2026 in Sydney | 19 September 2026 | Park, Darling Harbour | With Keen | |
| GMMTV Fan Day 37 in Paris | 3 October 2026 | Novotel Paris Est Centre de Conference | With Keen | |
| GMMTV Fanival: Happy Family | 6 October 2026 | Union Hall, Union Mall | With Keen | |
| Weirdo-101 Final EP. Fan Meeting | 16 October 2026 | 7th Fl. Iconsiam Hall | With Weirdo-101 cast | |
| GMMTV Fan Day 2027: Taipei | 17–18 April 2027 | Zepp New Taipei, Honhui Plaza | With Keen | |

== Concerts ==
| Title | Date | Venue | Notes | Ref. |
|---|---|---|---|---|
| GMMTV Starlympics 2025 | 20 December 2025 | Impact Arena, Muang Thong Thani | GMMTV Artists | |
| 26th Thai Festival in Tokyo | 10 May 2026 | Yoyogi Park, Shibuya Ward | With Keen, Krist, Singto, Clo'ver, | |
| Praew Charity Concert 2026 | 5 September 2026 | Nex Hall, 5th Fl. Siam Paragon | With Keen, Tham, Mac, FLIO | |
| Tout à fait Thaï 2026 | 4 October 2026 | Parc de Bagatelle | With Keen, Clo'ver | |

== Awards and nominations ==
Award nominations for Dechchart Tasilp
| Year | Award | Category | Nominee(s) | Result | Ref. |
|---|---|---|---|---|---|
| 2026 | Global OTT Awards | Best Newcomer (Male) | Head 2 Head | Nominated | |
| 2026 | 14th Howe Awards | Rising Icon | —N/a | Won | |
