= Summer Night (TV series) =

2024 Thai television series

- Official series poster
- Thai: ความลับในคืนฤดูร้อน
- Genre: Drama; Romantic comedy
- Based on: Summer Night ความลับในคืนฤดูร้อน by Boran and Jormungan
- Directed by: Rawiphon Hong-ngam
- Starring: Phuwin Tangsakyuen; Nachcha Chuedang; Natachai Boonprasert; Bhasidi Petchsutee
- Country of origin: Thailand
- Original language: Thai
- No. of episodes: 10

Production
- Executive producer: Sataporn Panichraksapong
- Running time: 57 minutes
- Production companies: GMMTV; LINE Webtoon Thailand

Original release
- Network: GMM25; Viu
- Release: 5 August – 7 October 2024

Summer Night (Thai: ความลับในคืนฤดูร้อน; RTGS: Khwam Lap Nai Khuen Ruedu Ron) is a 2024 Thai television series starring Phuwin Tangsakyuen, Nachcha Chuedang (Parn), Natachai Boonprasert (Dunk) and Bhasidi Petchsutee (Lookjun). It is based on Thai webtoon of the same name by Boran and Jormungan.

Directed by Rawiphon Hong-ngam (Captain) and produced by GMMTV together with LINE Webtoon Thailand, it was announced as one of the television series of GMMTV for 2024 during their "GMMTV2024: UP&ABOVE Part 1" event held on October 17, 2023. It aired on GMM25 and Viu from August 5 to October 7, 2024.

== Synopsis ==
Lune (Phuwin Tangsakyuen), a high school student, is sort of invisible to the rest of the school. Nobody pays attention to him. He only pays attention to Star (Nachcha Chuedang), the most popular girl in school. He can only look at her from afar because he always believes she is out of his league. He's never had the opportunity to be close to her. However, Lune and Star eventually meet through White (Natachai Boonprasert), who invites Lune to be his friend and introduces him to Star. Due to their shared interests, they gradually get closer. Until their friends get suspicious, especially White, who believes that Lune must secretly like Star, and Ivy (Bhasidi Petchsutee), Star's best friend who is protective of her. The trouble does not end there, because White also likes Star. Those events of that summer night mark the start of a turbulent tale of friendship, friendship, love, and hatred.

== Cast and characters ==
=== Main ===
- Phuwin Tangsakyuen as Nontharat Phuwananon (Lune)
- Nachcha Chuedang (Parn) as Darika Jittraphiphatkul (Star)
- Natachai Boonprasert (Dunk) as Thiwakorn Phonkitkamol (White)
- Bhasidi Petchsutee (Lookjun) as Irin Phrimkittikorn (Ivy)

=== Supporting ===
- Phudtripart Bhudthonamochai (Ryu) as Jewel
- Bhobdhama Hansa (Java) as Tan
- Praekwan Phongskul (Bimbeam) as Sera
- Nichapa Praepeerakul (Mymé) as Nana
- Kiatkamol Lata (Tui) as Alex (Lune's father)
- Preeyasuda Akkarasrisawad (Amm) as Duean (Star's mother)

=== Guest ===
- Chayapol Jutamas (AJ) as Zen (Ep. 1, 4)
- Peemsan Sotangkur (Luke) as Tan's co-worker (Ep. 5–6)
- Nutnicha Sangmanee (Pream) as Milk (Ep. 6–7)
- Tanan Lohawatanakul (Paul) as Ice (Ep. 6–7)
