= You Maniac =

2026 Thai television series

- Official series poster
- Thai: เดี๋ยวจะรักซะให้บ้า
- Genre: Romantic drama; Boys' love
- Written by: Waasuthep Ketpetch; Kanokphan Ornrattanasakul; Issaraporn Kuntisuk
- Directed by: Sasinan Pattana
- Starring: Jakrapatr Kaewpanpong; Supha Sangaworawong
- Music by: Putthipat Sangwanphet
- Opening theme: "Red Flag" by William Jakrapatr and Est Supha
- Country of origin: Thailand
- Original language: Thai
- No. of episodes: 10

Production
- Executive producers: Sataporn Panichraksapong; Darapa Choeysanguan
- Producers: Waasuthep Ketpetch; Hlung Lorjitramnuay; Puchong Tuntisungwaragul; Patha Thongpan; Nuttapong Mongkolsawas
- Cinematography: Rattaporn Thaiprasong
- Running time: 43–56 minutes
- Production companies: GMMTV; Parbdee Taweesuk

Original release
- Network: GMM 25; OneD
- Release: 29 August – 31 October 2026

You Maniac (Thai: เดี๋ยวจะรักซะให้บ้า; RTGS: Diao Cha Rak Sa Hai Ba, lit. 'Wait/Soon, I'll Love You Like Crazy' (Note: ให้บ้า can also be translated as 'to the point of [making someone go] crazy'.)) is a 2026 Thai boys' love television series starring Jakrapatr Kaewpanpong (William) and Supha Sangaworawong (Est).

Directed by Sasinan Pattana and produced by GMMTV and Parbdee Taweesuk, the series was announced during the GMMTV 2026: Magic Vibes Maximized event on 25 November 2025.

The series premiered on GMM 25 and OneD on 29 August 2026, airing on Saturdays at 20:30 ICT and 21:30 ICT, respectively.

== Synopsis ==
Handsome, tasteful Dean (Jakrapatr Kaewpanpong) likes to party and seduce, never wanting to be tied down. However, after accepting a request from his good friend Ten (Tinnasit Isarapongporn), Dean finds himself doing whatever it takes to win over contradictory artist Moth (Supha Sangaworawong). Ten wants to pursue Pun (Thanachai Sakchaicharoenkul), but Pun has feelings for Moth. At first, Dean doesn't give much thought to flirting, but Moth's indifference to him triggers his competitive instinct to win.

== Cast and characters ==
=== Main ===
- Jakrapatr Kaewpanpong (William) as Dean
- Supha Sangaworawong (Est) as Moth

=== Supporting ===
- Tinnasit Isarapongporn (Barcode) as Ten
- Thanachai Sakchaicharoenkul (Kin) as Pun
- Napat Patcharachavalit (Aun) as Ohm
- Panachkorn Rueksiriaree (Stamp) as Boom
- Phudtripart Bhudthonamochai (Ryu) as Hun
- Kirati Puangmalee (Title) as Jo

=== Guest ===
- Rapheephong Thapsuwan (Bright) as Mes
- Thishar Thurachon (Mint) as Duen
- Gojinmontouch Jirawongtaworn (Gojin)

== Original soundtrack ==
The official soundtrack for You Maniac features:

| Song | Artist(s) | Label | Ref. |
|---|---|---|---|
| "Red Flag" | William Jakrapatr and Est Supha | GMMTV Records | |
| "ใช้ใจ (By Heart)" | Est Supha | GMMTV Records | |
| "อาการจะรัก (Love Symptoms)" | William Jakrapatr and Est Supha | GMMTV Records | |
| "รักกันได้ยัง (Approved?)" | Barcode Tinnasit and Kin Thanachai | GMMTV Records | |
| "ครั้งหนึ่ง (One More Night)" | William Jakrapatr | GMMTV Records | |
| "Here with You" | William Jakrapatr | GMMTV Records | |
