= Kiss Me, Remember? =

Thai upcoming television series

- Official pilot poster
- Thai: จำเลยจุ๊บ
- Genre: Romance; Comedy
- Directed by: Sanpetch Wongprasertphol
- Starring: Tinnasit Isarapongporn; Thanachai Sakchaicharoenkul
- Country of origin: Thailand
- Original language: Thai

Production
- Production companies: GMMTV; Gemistry Studio

Kiss Me, Remember? (Thai: จำเลยจุ๊บ; RTGS: Cham Loei Chup) is an upcoming Thai boys' love television series starring Tinnasit Isarapongporn (Barcode) and Thanachai Sakchaicharoenkul (Kin).

Directed by Sanpetch Wongprasertphol and produced by GMMTV and Gemistry Studio, it was announced during the GMMTV 2026: Magic Vibes Maximized event on 25 November 2025.

== Synopsis ==
Pas (Tinnasit Isarapongporn), who has lost his memory, is saved from drowning through mouth-to-mouth. When Pas realizes that every time he kisses Kit (Thanachai Sakchaicharoenkul), the one who saved him, fragments of his memories are restored. As he attempts to uncover his past, Pas gradually grows closer to Kit, beginning a relationship that changes both of their lives.

== Cast and characters ==
=== Main ===
- Tinnasit Isarapongporn (Barcode) as Pas
- Thanachai Sakchaicharoenkul (Kin) as Kit

=== Supporting ===
- Kanthee Limpitikranon (Ken) as Phakin
- Tanan Lohawatanakul (Paul) as Tengnueng
- Poon Sutarom (Pun) as Bank
- Sillapintr Sillapachai (Sangt) as Jane
- Supakorn Kantanit (Guitar) as Korn
- Tachakorn Boonlupyanun (Godji) as Eiang

== Production ==
In June 2026, the cast held the first script reading for the series. The event was attended by Tinnasit Isarapongporn, Thanachai Sakchaicharoenkul and the remaining members of the main cast. On 7 July 2026, GMMTV aired a segment on GMMTV Live House featuring behind-the-scenes footage from the first day of filming. The programme included interviews with Tinnasit Isarapongporn, Thanachai Sakchaicharoenkul, Kanthee Limpitikranon, Tanan Lohawatanakul, Sillapintr Sillapachai and Poon Sutarom.
