= Muteluv =

2025–26 Thai television series

- Official series poster
- Thai: โปรดใช้วิจารณญาณในการรักเธอ
- Genre: Drama; Supernatural; Romantic comedy
- Directed by: Muangthai Sarupkarn; Sasinan Pattana; Thachai Komolphet; Jarupat Kannula; Suwanun Pohgudsai
- Starring: Dechchart Tasilp; Suvijak Piyanopharoj; Hirunkit Changkham; Warut Chawalitrujiwong; Nachcha Chuedang; Nattanon Tongsaeng; Rapeepong Supatineekitdecha; Patsit Permpoonsavat; Trai Nimtawat; Wongravee Nateetorn; Chanikarn Tangkabodee; Ployshompoo Supasap; Prariyapit Yu; Thanaphon U-sinsap; Jirawat Sutivanichsak; Juthapich Indrajundra; Kucci; Patchara Silapasoonthorn; Bhobdhama Hansa
- Opening theme: "Abracadabra จงรักจงหลง" by FELIZZ
- Country of origin: Thailand
- Original language: Thai
- No. of episodes: 28

Production
- Running time: 48 minutes
- Production companies: GMMTV; Parbdee Taweesuk

Original release
- Network: GMM 25; YouTube; TrueVisions NOW
- Release: 25 August 2025 – 2 March 2026

Muteluv (Thai: โปรดใช้วิจารณญาณในการรักเธอ; RTGS: Prot Chai Wicharanayan Nai Kan Rak Thoe; lit. Please Use Discretion in Loving You; stylized as MuTeLuv) is a Thai supernatural romantic comedy anthology television series produced by GMMTV together with Parbdee Taweesuk. The series consists of seven short stories with each story being split into four episodes, following the various people who use the supernatural forces to achieve their goals, including in finding love.

Directed by five directors, it was announced as one of the television series of GMMTV for 2025 during their "GMMTV 2025: Riding the Wave" event held on 26 November 2024. It premiered on 25 August 2025, airing every Monday at 20:30 (ICT) on GMM 25 and TrueVisions NOW.

== "Hi" by My Luck ==
=== Synopsis ===
When a fortune teller predicts that love will come in the form of someone close to him, Err (Suvijak Piyanopharoj) has to go all out to win over Mawin (Dechchart Tasilp), his academic rival who stole the number one spot in their class. The mission is to stick together, helping each other with studies and tutoring. But when one of them takes a real interest, what will happen?

=== Cast and characters ===
==== Main ====
- Dechchart Tasilp (Sea) as Mawin Suthiraksa
- Suvijak Piyanopharoj (Keen) as Anantachai Kraikaew (Err)

==== Supporting ====
- Puttipong Jitbut (Chokun) as Benz
- Napat Patcharachavalit (Aun) as Kirtsana Morakot-amphorn (Mhee)
- Chompoopuntip Temtanamongkol (Acare) as Natcha Jettanakan (Mangpor)
- Pheerawit Koolkang (Captain) as Tontrakul Yotsongkhram (Ton)
- Supakorn Kantanit (Guitar) as Khirakorn Semlao (Prik-klua)
- Chayuth Gorsurat (Titan) as Chonlathorn Sinsak (Yo)
- Sillapintr Sillapachai (Sangt) as Klinkaew Sirikan (Golf)
- Tupthong Suwanrakanont (Tham) as Phonthep Thatuphaibun
- Tiranat Kittisattho (Juno) as Suksawat La-iat (Mara)

==== Guest ====
- Tipnaree Weerawatnodom (Namtan, cameo)
- Panachai Sriariyarungruang (Junior, cameo)
- Nattawat Jirochtikul (Fourth, cameo)

== Not My Father ==
=== Synopsis ===
Ploy's (Nachcha Chuedang) life is turned upside down when Phupha (Warut Chawalitrujiwong), the senior she secretly likes, invites her to join a dangerous mission: exposing the "Chantharusati Family," a local cult within their province. But her hopes of getting closer to Phupha are thwarted when she starts being watched by Wutkrai (Hirunkit Changkham), a suspicious young follower. "The Father", also seems to take a particular interest in Ploy. How will Ploy and Phupha survive the clutches of this cult and its leader?

=== Cast and characters ===
==== Main ====
- Hirunkit Changkham (Nani) as Wutkrai Phantharak
- Warut Chawalitrujiwong (Prem) as Phupha Akkhrawaranon
- Nachcha Chuedang (Parn) as Ployphairin Klinkluai (Ploy)

==== Supporting ====
- Krongkwan Nakornthap (Jaoying) as Fay
- Gornpop Janjaroen (Joke) as Father
- Preeyaphat Lawsuwansiri (Earn) as Yok
- Chayakorn Jutamas (JJ) as Ake

== Diva Deva Mata ==
=== Synopsis ===
The members of popular influencer group the "Air Dolls" Nevia (Nattanon Tongsaeng), Ingky (Rapeepong Supatineekitdecha), Fews (Soodyacht Permpoonpatsit), and Katrina (Trai Nimtawat) turn to a powerful spirit medium - "Diva Deva Mata", who is said to have the power to help influencers reach the top - when their channel's follower count stops increasing. However, when the spirit turns against Kat, Nevia, Ingky and Fews must work together to find a way to exorcise the spirit of Diva Deva Mata from their friend.

=== Cast and characters ===
==== Main ====
- Nattanon Tongsaeng (Fluke) as Pichapob Narawin (Nevia)
- Rapeepong Supatineekitdecha (Lego) as Daruni Laohongyokfah (Ingky)
- Patsit Permpoonsavat (Soodyacht) as Fews
- Trai Nimtawat (Neo) as Katrina Wangrareng (Kat)

==== Supporting ====
- Natarit Worakornlertsith (Marc) as Bank
- Metas Opas-iamkajorn (Mick) as Pat
- Kittipat Chalaragse (Golf) as Medtubtim
- Niti Chaichitathorn (Pompam) as Edith Proof

== Fist Foot Fusion ==
=== Synopsis ===
Klairung (Wongravee Nateetorn), a rising TikToker and boxing influencer, is in trouble. Sunrise (Pakin Kunaanuwit), a TikToker known for exposing secrets, is about to reveal the truth: that Klairung is just a fashion boxer who can't actually fight! Afraid of being exposed, Klairung decides to make a wish at a shrine, praying for victory in his upcoming fight. And surprisingly, he wins. But with his "I'm just naturally talented, sir!" attitude, Klairung refuses to fulfill his vow, resulting in his hand being permanently open, unable to clench his fist and box anymore. Klairung has no choice but to rely on Malai (Chanikarn Tangkabodee), a cunning and resourceful dancer who seems to be the only one who knows how to fulfill his vow.

=== Cast and characters ===
==== Main ====
- Wongravee Nateetorn (Sky) as Phayap Trisiriwimol (Klairung)
- Chanikarn Tangkabodee (Prim) as Malai

==== Supporting ====
- Pakin Kunaanuwit (Mark) as Sunrise
- Kanyarat Ruangrung (Piploy) as Lipsync

==== Guest ====
- Napapat Sattha-atikom (Chelsea) as Mali
- Leo Saussay as Biao

== Hello, Is This Luck? ==
=== Synopsis ===
Sixth-year medical student Na (Ployshompoo Supasap) is the epitome of "talented but unlucky." She always believes that where there's effort, there's success. When Na falls in love with Nine (Thanaphon U-sinsap), a handsome and intelligent senior doctor who is beyond her reach, she discovers her rival is Leemhai (Prariyapit Yu), a successful artist who seems to be incredibly lucky in everything she does.

=== Cast and characters ===
==== Main ====
- Ployshompoo Supasap (Jan) as Nararat Jongmankit (Na)
- Prariyapit Yu (JingJing) as Leemhai
- Thanaphon U-sinsap (Leng) as Nine

==== Supporting ====
- Thamonchita Narmkool (Mantra) as Wathini Sinthupanya (Aim)
- Panachkorn Rueksiriaree (Stamp) as Dylan
- Samantha Melanie Coates (Sammy) as Bly

== Love Lock ==
=== Synopsis ===
Moving on from a past love isn't easy, as memories and good feelings often haunt the heart. Payu (Jirawat Sutivanichsak), a recent graduate dumped by his ex-girlfriend, May (Juthapich Indrajundra), is no exception. On their anniversary, he finds himself experiencing vivid hallucinations of May, both visually and audibly, whenever he tries to start a new relationship. Every date falls apart. He believes the cause is an "Ema" plaque - a Japanese love charm that May had written just for him. Driven on by a single photograph, Payu embarks on a journey to find it, hoping to break the curse. An unexpected accident leads him to meet Satsuki (Kucci), an unlucky Japanese woman who reluctantly takes care of him and becomes his guide in his quest for the mysterious charm. Amidst a journey filled with confusion, injury and problems, Payu must decide whether his solution is to destroy the charm and return to Thailand, or to confront the new feelings slowly developing in his heart.

=== Cast and characters ===
==== Main ====
- Jirawat Sutivanichsak (Dew) as Payu
- Juthapich Indrajundra (Jamie) as May
- Kucci as Satsuki

==== Supporting ====
- Chayapol Jutamas (AJ) as Jab

== Love Me If You Swear ==
=== Synopsis ===
When Tum (Patchara Silapasoonthorn), the newly-minted leader of the Nuea In gang, just got the position through a 'spiritual' ritual. He experiences terrible luck when Oh (Bhobdhama Hansa), the leader of the Pathumphaisan gang steals his gang's emblem. When his gang members begin to question Tum's abilities and whether he deserves the position, Tum realizes it's all because he didn't fulfill the vow he made. He embarks on a mission to fulfill his vow at nine temples, but his bad luck doesn't stop there; he encounters Oh, who is also there to fulfill his own vow. As the two embark on a journey to fulfill their vows together, will this adventure transform them from rivals to partners-in-crime, or perhaps even something more?

=== Cast and characters ===
==== Main ====
- Patchara Silapasoonthorn (Surf) as Teetat Rungreungtat (Tum)
- Bhobdhama Hansa (Java) as Christopher Boonying (Oh)

==== Supporting ====
- Thanawin Teeraphosukarn (Louis) as Messi
- Thanathat Tanjararak (Indy) as Mojo

== Series overview ==
Series	Title	Episodes	Originally released	
Series	Title	Episodes	First released	Last released
1	"Hi" by My Luck	4	25 August 2025	15 September 2025
2	Not My Father	4	22 September 2025	13 October 2025
3	Diva Deva Mata	4	20 October 2025	10 November 2025
4	Fist Foot Fusion	4	17 November 2025	8 December 2025
5	Hello, Is This Luck?	4	15 December 2025	5 January 2026
6	Love Lock	4	12 January 2026	2 February 2026
7	Love Me If You Swear	4	9 February 2026	2 March 2026

== Movie screenings ==
- The segments "Hi" by My Luck and Love Me If You Swear received exclusive movie screenings in Hong Kong, Cebu, Manila and Singapore, with the latter also receiving a screening in Tokyo.

Year	Title	Date	Venue	Ref.
2026	"Hi" by My Luck The Movie: Screening in Hong Kong	29 August 2026	Cine-Art House, Emerald Plaza	
2026	Love Me If You Swear The Movie: Screening in Hong Kong	29 August 2026	Cine-Art House, Emerald Plaza	
2026	"Hi" by My Luck The Movie: Screening in Cebu	12 September 2026	Sky Hall Seaside	
2026	Love Me If You Swear The Movie: Screening in Cebu	12 September 2026	Sky Hall Seaside	
2026	"Hi" by My Luck The Movie: Screening in Manila	13 September 2026	Samsung Hall, SM Aura Premiere	
2026	Love Me If You Swear The Movie: Screening in Manila	13 September 2026	Samsung Hall, SM Aura Premiere	
2026	"Hi" by My Luck The Movie: Screening in Singapore	21 November 2026	Foochow Building	
2026	Love Me If You Swear The Movie: Screening in Singapore	21 November 2026	Foochow Building	
2026	Love Me If You Swear The Movie: Screening in Tokyo	4 December 2026	Animate Theatre	
