= Kucci =

- Born: June 16, 2004 (age 22); Nagoya, Aichi Prefecture, Japan
- Occupations: Singer, songwriter
- Instrument: Guitar
- Years active: 2025–present
- Label: Sony Music Entertainment Japan

Kucci (born June 16, 2004) is a Japanese singer and songwriter from Nagoya who is affiliated with Sony Music Entertainment Japan. Having been active as a singer on TikTok, she made her major debut in 2025 with the release of her debut song "Tokimeki". Her song "Liar" was used as the first opening theme to the anime television series Chitose Is in the Ramune Bottle.

== Biography ==
Kucci was born in Nagoya on June 16, 2004. Her interest in music began at an early age when she taught herself to play the piano that her parents gifted her for Christmas. She started singing in a choir in elementary school, an activity she would continue upon entering junior high school. Despite her interest in music, she initially thought she would enter the beauty industry, following in the footsteps of her mother. However, during her first year of high school, she was forced to spend three months at home due to the COVID-19 pandemic. It was during this time she started playing the guitar, a gift her parents gave her for passing her high school entrance exams. After classes resumed, she joined her the school light music club.

When she was 16 years old, Kucci uploaded a video on social media of her singing a song written by her mother; the song was originally dedicated to Kucci's late father. This caught the attention of a talent agency, who reached out to her. As she was in her second year of high school, she was skeptical at first, knowing it meant moving to Tokyo, but ultimately decided to accept the offer in order to pursue a music career. She began her activities as a musician since she was 17 years old, posting covers of musicians and bands such as Macaroni Empitsu, Hitsujibungaku, and Mariya Takeuchi. She spent four months studying abroad in Thailand in 2024, taking advantage of the period before her major debut, becoming able to understand and speak some Thai.

Kucci made her major debut in 2025, performing the song "Tokimeki". The song was used as the theme song to the two-part film Megami Kōrin, a Japanese adaptation of the Korean webtoon True Beauty. Later that year, she performed the song "Liar", which was used as the first opening theme to the anime television series Chitose Is in the Ramune Bottle.

== Discography ==
=== Singles ===
- "Tokimeki" (ときめき) (March 20, 2025) (Digital single)
- Liar (ライアー, Raiā) (October 15, 2025) (Digital single), (December 17, 2025) (Physical release)

=== EPs ===
- Tokimeki (May 1, 2025)

== Filmography ==
=== Television series ===
| Year | Title | Role | Notes | Channel | Ref. |
|---|---|---|---|---|---|
| 2026 | MuTeLuv: Love Lock | Satsuki | Main Role | GMM25 | |
