= Only Boo! =

2024 Thai television series

- Official series poster
- Thai: แค่ที่แกง
- Genre: Boys' love; Romantic comedy
- Based on: แค่ที่แกง (Khae Thi Kaeng) by peachhplease
- Screenplay by: Sakon Wongsinwiset; Pattarawalai Wongsinwises; Sureechay Kaewses; Rittikrai Kanjanawiphu
- Directed by: Sakon Wongsinwiset
- Starring: Dechchart Tasilp; Suvijak Piyanopharoj
- Opening theme: "แค่ที่แกง" by Keen Suvijak
- Composers: Orave Pinijsarapirom; Supakorn Jermcharoen
- Country of origin: Thailand
- Original language: Thai
- No. of episodes: 12

Production
- Executive producers: Sataporn Panichraksapong; Darapa Choeysanguan
- Cinematography: Pongthorn Thongwattana; Wongbavorn Onwimon
- Running time: 45–50 minutes
- Production companies: GMMTV; Gmo Films

Original release
- Network: GMM 25
- Release: 31 March – 23 June 2024

Only Boo! (Thai: แค่ที่แกง; Khae Thi Kaeng) is a 2024 Thai boys' love television series directed by Sakon Wongsinwiset, starring Dechchart Tasilp (Sea) and Suvijak Piyanopharoj (Keen). Adapted from the novel of the same name by peachhplease and produced by GMMTV together with Gmo Films, it was announced at the GMMTV 2024: Up & Above Part 1 event held on 17 October 2023.

The series premiered on GMM 25 on 31 March 2024, airing every Friday at 20:30 ICT, and concluded on 23 June 2024.

== Synopsis ==
Moo (Suvijak Piyanopharoj), a high school student with dreams of debuting as a boy band member, is transferred to a new school. Fate leads Moo to meet Kang (Dechchart Tasilp), a street food vendor. Kang's kindness impresses Moo, who gradually developing feelings for him. Feeling adventurous, Moo is determined to win him over. Moo persistently pursues Kang while diligently practicing his singing and dancing, eventually debuting as an artist. However, this debut comes with a strict rule from the agency: "Absolutely no girlfriends or boyfriends!"

== Cast and characters ==
=== Main ===
- Dechchart Tasilp (Sea) as Pakorn Wongwiset (Kang)
- Suvijak Piyanopharoj (Keen) as Mok Diloksakulkan (Moo)

=== Supporting ===
- Napat Patcharachavalit (Aun) as Naphat Chaowalitkul (Potae)
- Peerakan Teawsuwan (Ashi) as Phira Thiansuwan (Payos)
- Pansa Vosbein (Milk) as Net
- Kasidet Plookphol (Book) as Shone
- Thanawin Teeraphosulaen (Louis) as Jang

=== Guest ===
- Lerwith Sangsith (Aon) as Kang's father (Ep. 1–2)
- Naruemon Phongsupap (Koy) as Kai (Kang's mother) (Ep. 1, 3–4, 12)
- Supoj Pongpancharoen (Durian) as Principal Somkhuan (Ep. 1, 4–5, 12)
- Teeranai Na Nongkai (Nammon) as Dao (Moo's mother) (Ep. 1, 6, 9–10, 12)
- Pongsit Phisitthakarn (Eikew) as Joei (Ep. 2–5, 12)
- Jiratchapong Srisang (Force) (Ep. 12)

== Production and release ==
Production began on 12 January 2024, and officially concluded on 12 April 2024.

The official trailer was released on 17 March 2024, alongside the announcement of the release date. The series premiered on GMM 25 on 31 March 2024.

Production revealed that the series would air second episode as scheduled and then release a rerun of the same episode the week after, with third episode being a delayed release. The series resumed by airing the third episode on 21 April 2024. It officially concluded on 23 June 2024.

== Original soundtrack ==
The official soundtrack for Only Boo! features:

Song	Artist(s)	Label	Ref.
"แค่ที่แกง (Only Boo)"	Keen Suvijak	GMMTV Records	
"เกินกว่า Friend (Situationship)"	Ashi Peerakan	GMMTV Records	
"Check Me"	Louis Thanawin	GMMTV Records	
"พี่(อย่า)แกง (Don't Be Fooled)"	Sea Dechchart and Keen Suvijak	GMMTV Records	
"ดังกว่าเก่า (Louder)"	Keen Suvijak	GMMTV Records	
"ติดกลางใจ (Gump)"	Keen Suvijak, Aun Napat, Ashi Peerakan and Louis Thanawin	GMMTV Records	
"สถานีที่ศูนย์ (Station No.0)"	Keen Suvijak	GMMTV Records	
