= Head 2 Head (Thai TV series) =

2025–26 Thai television series

- Official series poster
- Thai: ไหนใครว่าพวกมันไม่ถูกกัน
- Genre: Romantic drama; Boys' Love
- Based on: ไหนใครว่าเจเจไม่ถูกกัน? by My feline
- Screenplay by: Inthira Thanasarnsumrit
- Directed by: Siwaj Sawatmaneekul
- Starring: Dechchart Tasilp; Suvijak Piyanopharoj
- Opening theme: "คิดว่าไม่ แต่ดันใช่ (Turns Out It’s You)" by Sea Dechchart and Keen Suvijak
- Ending theme: "คิดว่าไม่ แต่ดันใช่ (Turns Out It’s You)" by Sea Dechchart and Keen Suvijak (Ep. 1); "จริงๆ ชอบเธอ (Secret Crush)" by Sea Dechchart (Ep. 2, 4, 8–12); "ไหนว่าไม่ชอบ (Not a Crush?)" by Keen Suvijak (Ep. 3, 7); "เพื่อนข้างๆ (Friend Next Door)" by Surf Patchara and Java Bhobdhama (Ep. 5–6)
- Composer: Pure Kanin
- Country of origin: Thailand
- Original language: Thai
- No. of episodes: 12

Production
- Executive producers: Sataporn Panichraksapong; Darapa Choeysanguan
- Producers: Nuttapong Mongkolsawas; Supaporn Lertthitiverakarn
- Cinematography: Saran Jantharakkha; Chonticha Suttiphaet
- Running time: 45–51 minutes
- Production companies: GMMTV; Studio Wabi Sabi

Original release
- Network: GMM 25
- Release: 26 October 2025 – 11 January 2026

Head 2 Head (Thai: ไหนใครว่าพวกมันไม่ถูกกัน; RTGS: Nai Khrai Wa Phuak Man Mai Thukkan, lit. 'Who Said They Don't Get Along?') is a 2025 Thai boys' love television series, starring Dechchart Tasilp (Sea) and Suvijak Piyanopharoj (Keen), based on the novel ไหนใครว่าเจเจไม่ถูกกัน? by My feline.

Directed by Siwaj Sawatmaneekul and produced by GMMTV and Studio Wabi Sabi, it was announced during GMMTV Riding the Wave event on 26 November 2024. The series premiered on 26 October 2025 and aired on GMM 25, and was available for streaming internationally via GMMTV's official YouTube channel and TrueVisions Now.

== Synopsis ==
The rivalry between Jerome (Dechchart Tasilp) and Jinn (Suvijak Piyanopharoj), known throughout the university as "Two J's", begins with their childhood. Even after entering university, they somehow remain inseparable. Their houses are directly across from each other, they share the same friend group, and their families are close. Despite attempts by those around them to bridge the gap, nothing works; their intense hatred for each other persists.

However, fate plays a cruel trick when Jerome becomes able to foresee events set to happen ten years into the future, realising that the two, who currently despise each other, will become life partners and that Jinn will disappear from his life soon after. No matter how much they hate each other or push each other away, Jerome is determined to rewrite their future for the better.

== Cast and characters ==
=== Main ===
- Dechchart Tasilp (Sea) as Jirakan Methaves (Jerome / J)
- Suvijak Piyanopharoj (Keen) as Jinn Thichayothin

=== Supporting ===
- Patchara Silapasoonthorn (Surf) as Farm
- Bhobdhama Hansa (Java) as Van
- Chayakorn Jutamas (JJ) as Mai
- Sujira Arunpipat (Nui) as Jan Thichayothin (Jinn's mother)
- Vichuda Pindum (Mam) as Jen Methaves (Jerome's mother)
- Supoj Janjareonborn (Lift) as Wee Methaves (Jerome's father)
- Patiparn Patavekarn (Mos) as Jet Thichayothin (Jinn's father)

=== Guest ===
- Thitipoom Techaapaikhun (New) as Tar (Ep. 1–2, 5)
- Tanan Lohawatanakul (Paul) as Beam (Ep. 1, 3)

== Broadcast ==
The series was broadcast on GMM 25, streamed on YouTube via GMMTV’s official channel and was available on TrueVisions Now.

== Original soundtrack ==
Song	Artist(s)	Label	Ref.
"คิดว่าไม่ แต่ดันใช่ (Turns Out It's You)"	Sea Dechchart and Keen Suvijak	GMMTV Records	
"จริงๆ ชอบเธอ (Secret Crush)"	Sea Dechchart	GMMTV Records	
"ไหนว่าไม่ชอบ (Not a Crush?)"	Keen Suvijak	GMMTV Records	
"เพื่อนข้างๆ (Friend Next Door)"	Surf Patchara and Java Bhobdhama	GMMTV Records	

== Reception ==
TrueID emphasized the dynamic between rivalry and friendship in the storyline. MGR Online noted that the series attracted attention for its BL format aimed at younger audiences and its positive early reception. Kapook highlighted the chemistry between the lead actors. Sanook also reported on the audience response. Bangkok Biz News and Thai Post mentioned the series as part of GMMTV’s 2025 programming.

== Awards and nominations ==
Year	Award ceremony	Category	Nominee / work	Result	Ref.
2026	Global OTT Awards	Best Newcomer (Male)	Dechchart Tasilp	Nominated	
