= Suvijak Piyanopharoj =

Thai actor and singer (born 2005)

- สุวิจักขณ์ ปิยะนพโรจน์
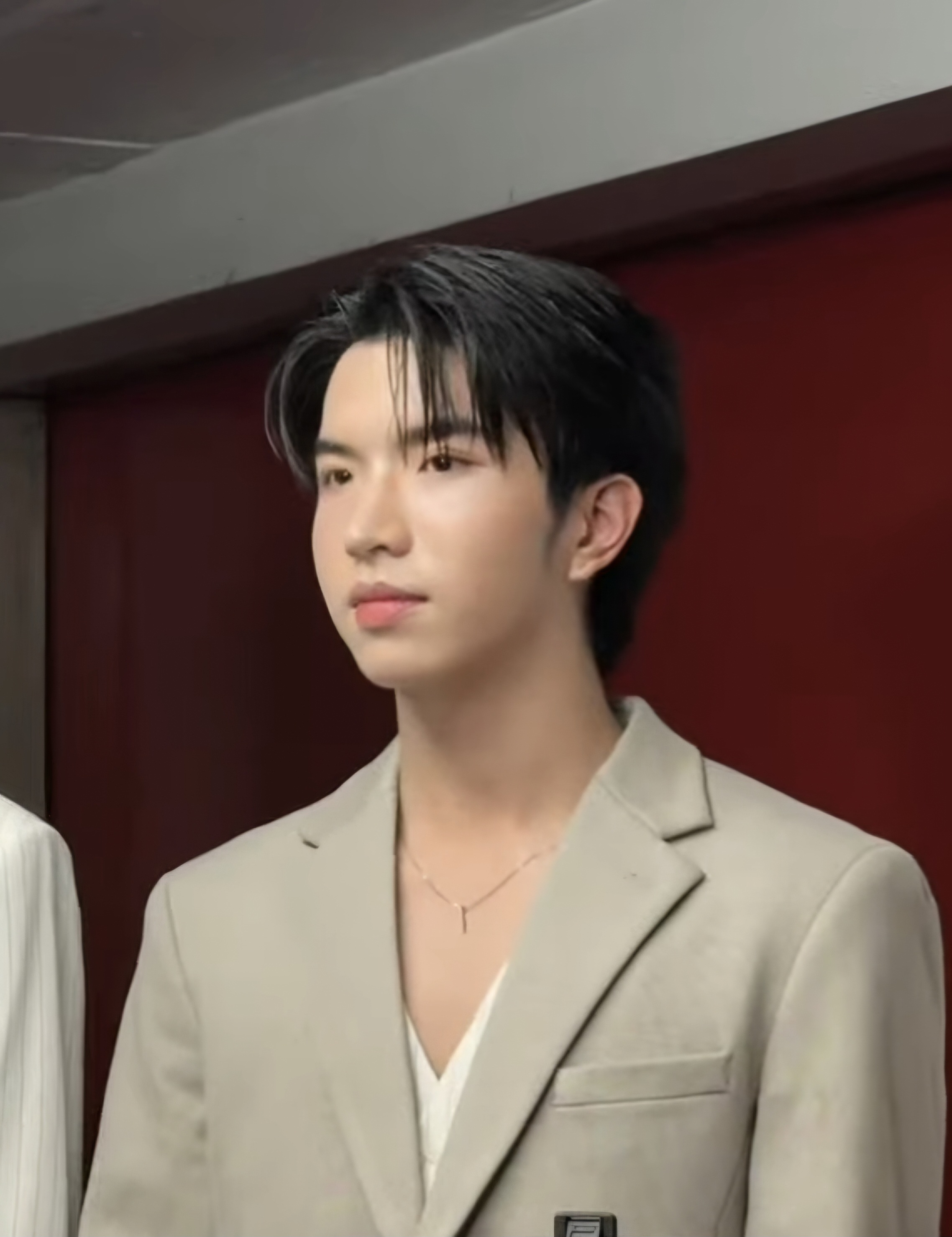
- Suvijak in December 2025
- Born: 18 August 2005 (age 21); Thailand
- Other names: Keen (คีน); Suwichak Piyanoppharot
- Education: Chulalongkorn University
- Occupations: Singer; actor
- Years active: 2024–present
- Agent: GMMTV
- Known for: Moo in Only Boo!; Jinn in Head 2 Head; Niran in Weirdo-101
- Height: 1.78 m (5 ft 10 in)
- Musical career
- Genre: Thai pop
- Instrument: Vocals
- Years active: 2025–present
- Label: Riser Music
- Member of: Clo'ver

Suvijak Piyanopharoj (Thai: สุวิจักขณ์ ปิยะนพโรจน์; born 18 August 2005), nicknamed Keen (Thai: คีน), is a Thai singer and actor signed under GMMTV, known for his roles in Only Boo! (2024), Head 2 Head (2025) and Weirdo-101 (2026). He was a contestant on the survival show Project Alpha, coming in 7th place behind the five-member boy group LYKN and Vendelbo Jakobsen.

Suvijak is also a member of the T-pop boy group Clo'ver formed by Riser Music. The group debuted on 27 November 2025, with the digital single "คนคุ้นคอย (Next To You)".

== Early life and education ==
Keen attended Assumption College for secondary education, which he, along with 7 other students, represented in the international CanSat Competition held in the United States from 9–12 June 2022 where his team won the championship while in Grade 12 (Matthayom 6). He is currently pursuing a bachelor's degree in Electrical Engineering at Chulalongkorn University.

== Career ==
In 2023, Keen competed in the survival show Project Alpha, coming in 7th place and signing with GMMTV after the completion of the show.

In 2025, Keen was announced as a member of the boy group Clo'ver under the Riser Music label, alongside fellow GMMTV actors Tinnasit Isarapongporn (Barcode), Peerakan Teawsuwan (Ashi) and Ochiris Suwanacheep (Aungpao). Ashi and Aungpao were also contestants on Project Alpha alongside Keen. Clo'ver debuted with their digital single "คนคุ้นคอย (Next To You)" on 27 November 2025.

== Filmography ==
=== Film ===
Year	Title	Role	Notes	Ref.
2022	My Tempo	Taekhun	Supporting role	

=== Television series ===
Key
†	Denotes television productions that have not yet been released

Year	Title	Role	Network	Notes	Ref.
2023	My Tempo: The Series	Taekhun	YouTube	Supporting role	
2024	Only Boo!	"Moo" Mok Diloksakulkan	GMM 25	Main role	
2024	ThamePo: Heart That Skips a Beat	"Moo" Mok Diloksakulkan	GMM 25	Guest role	
2025	MuTeLuv: "Hi" by My Luck	"Err" Anantachai Kraikaew	GMM 25	Main role	
2025	Head 2 Head	Jinn Thichayothin	GMM 25	Main role	
2026	Love You Teacher	Thara	GMM 25	Guest role	
2026	Ticket to Heaven	Phai	GMM 25	Guest role	
2026	Weirdo-101	"Niran" Phiangniran Kittimetee	One 31	Main role	
TBA	Starscope †	"Khiang" Khiangdao	TBA	Main role	

=== Music video appearances ===
Year	Title	Artist(s)	Role	Ref.
2024	"Check Me"	Louis Thanawin	"Moo" Mok Diloksakulkan	
2025	"จริงๆ ชอบเธอ (Secret Crush)"	Sea Dechchart	Jinn Thichayothin	

== Discography ==
=== Singles ===
==== Digital singles ====
Year	Title	Label	Notes	Ref.
2025	"คนคุ้นคอย (Next To You)"	Riser Music	Clo'ver 1st digital single	
2026	"Bad Boy No 'Do'"	Riser Music	Clo'ver 2nd digital single	
2026	"Lonely Girl"	Riser Music	Clo'ver 3rd digital single	
2026	"Think About You"	Riser Music	Clo'ver 4th digital single	

==== Collaborations ====
Year	Title	Label	Ref.
2026	"ยอมมะ (Will You?)" with Sea Dechchart	GMMTV Records	

==== Soundtrack appearances ====
Year	Title	Soundtrack	Label	Ref.
2024	"แค่ที่แกง (Only Boo)"	Only Boo! OST	GMMTV Records	
2024	"พี่(อย่า)แกง (Don't Be Fooled)" with Sea Dechchart	Only Boo! OST	GMMTV Records	
2024	"ดังกว่าเก่า (Louder)"	Only Boo! OST	GMMTV Records	
2024	"ติดกลางใจ (Gump)" with Aun Napat, Ashi Peerakan, Louis Thanawin	Only Boo! OST	GMMTV Records	
2024	"สถานีที่ศูนย์ (Station No.0)"	Only Boo! OST	GMMTV Records	
2025	"คิดว่าไม่ แต่ดันใช่ (Turns Out It's You)" with Sea Dechchart	Head 2 Head OST	GMMTV Records	
2025	"ไหนว่าไม่ชอบ (Not a Crush?)"	Head 2 Head OST	GMMTV Records	
2026	"โน้ม (Gravity)" with Sea Dechchart	Weirdo-101 OST	GMMTV Records	
2026	"วอนขอดาว (Beside You)" with Sea Dechchart	Weirdo-101 OST	GMMTV Records	

== Fan meetings ==
Title	Date	Venue	Notes	Ref.
GMMTV Fan Event in Tokyo	15 May 2024	Animate Theatre	With Sea	
Only Boo! Final EP. Fan Meeting	23 June 2024	9th Fl. Earthlab Cinema by Dr. CBD, SF World Cinema, Centralworld	With Only Boo! cast	
SeaKeen Fan Meeting in Taipei	17 August 2024	Hanaspace	With Sea	
Head 2 Head: The First Round	18 October 2025	9th Fl. Cinema 15, SF World Cinema, Centralworld	With Head 2 Head cast	
Head 2 Head Final EP. Fan Meeting	11 January 2026	6th Fl. Siam Paragon, Siam Pavalai, Paragon Cineplex	With Head 2 Head cast	
Naiin Book Fair 2026	25 January 2026	5th Fl. Samyan Mitrtown	With Sea	
GMMTV Fanival 2026	1 April 2026	7th Fl. CentralWorld Pulse Hall, Centralworld	With Clo'ver	
GMMTV Fanival 2026	6 April 2026	7th Fl. CentralWorld Pulse Hall, Centralworld	With Sea	
SeaKeen Fan Meeting in Thailand	26 April 2026	3rd Fl. MCC Hall, The Mall Lifestore Bangkapi	With Sea	
SeaKeen 2nd Fan Meeting in Taipei	3 May 2026	Hanaspace	With Sea	
GMMTV International Novel Festival 2026	26 July 2026	5th Fl. Samyan Mitrtown	With Sea	
Weirdo-101: The First Gravity	14 August 2026	7th Fl. Centralworld Pulse Hall, Centralworld	With Weirdo-101 cast	
GMMTV Fan Day 34 in Sydney	19 September 2026	City Recital Hall	With Sea	
Clo'ver Fan Sign in Sydney	19 September 2026	City Recital Hall	With Clo'ver	
Thailand Grand Festival 2026 in Sydney	19 September 2026	Tumbalong Park, Darling Harbour	With Clo'ver	
Thailand Grand Festival 2026 in Sydney	19 September 2026	Tumbalong Park, Darling Harbour	With Sea	
GMMTV Fan Day 37 in Paris	3 October 2026	Novotel Paris Est Centre de Conference	With Sea	
GMMTV Fanival: Happy Family	6 October 2026	Union Hall, Union Mall	With Sea	
GMMTV Fanival: Happy Family	7 October 2026	Union Hall, Union Mall	With Clo'ver	
Weirdo-101 Final EP. Fan Meeting	16 October 2026	7th Fl. Iconsiam Hall	With Weirdo-101 cast	
GMMTV Fan Day 2027: Taipei	17–18 April 2027	Zepp New Taipei, Honhui Plaza	With Sea	

== Concerts ==
Title	Date	Venue	Notes	Ref.
GMMTV Musicon Japan	26–27 July 2025	Toyosu PIT	With Krist, Gawin, Satang, Barcode, LYKN, JASP.ER	
GMMTV Starlympics 2025	20 December 2025	Impact Arena, Muang Thong Thani	GMMTV Artists	
Riser Concert: The First Rise	13–15 February 2026	Impact Arena, Muang Thong Thani	With Krist, Nanon, Win, Fourth, Gemini, Phuwin, Perth, LYKN, JASP.ER, Felizz, Clo'ver	
Clo'ver & Felizz T-Pop Showcase	3 May 2026	Hanaspace, Taipei	With Felizz, Clo'ver	
Riser Music T-Pop Showcase 2026	8 May 2026	Hokutopia Sakura Hall, Tokyo	With Krist, Nanon, Gawin, Felizz, Clo'ver	
26th Thai Festival in Tokyo	10 May 2026	Yoyogi Park, Shibuya Ward	With Clo'ver, Sea, Krist, Singto	
GMMTV Musicon Singapore	30–31 May 2026	Singapore Expo	With Krist, Nanon, Gawin, LYKN, JASP.ER, Felizz, Clo'ver	
Gotchapop Concert 4	6 June 2026	Queen Sirikit National Convention Center	With Felizz, Clo'ver	
"มิตรTime" at Samyan Mitrtown Vol. 2	20 June 2026	Samyan Mitrtown	With Felizz, Clo'ver	
SawasdeeSeoul Thai Festival 2026	21 June 2026	Cheonggye Plaza, Seoul	With Clo'ver	
Monster Music Festival 2026	25 July 2026	Queen Sirikit National Convention Center	With Felizz, Clo'ver	
Felizz & Clo'ver Happening Stage	5 August 2026	One Bangkok Park	With Felizz, Clo'ver	
Praew Charity Concert 2026	5 September 2026	Nex Hall, 5th Fl. Siam Paragon	With Sea, Tham, Mac, FLIO	
Nineentertain 24th Anniversary Charity Concert	30 September 2026	Parc Paragon, Siam Paragon	With Krist, Almond, Progress, Jan, JingJing, Felizz, Clo'ver	
T-Pop Stage in Paris	3 October 2026	Novotel Paris Est Centre de Conference	With Clo'ver	
Tout à fait Thaï 2026	4 October 2026	Parc de Bagatelle	With Sea, Clo'ver	
GMMTV Starlympics 2026	28 November 2026	Impact Arena, Muang Thong Thani	GMMTV Artists	

Upcoming

== Awards and nominations ==
Award nominations for Suvijak Piyanopharoj
Year	Award	Category	Nominee(s)	Result	Ref.
2026	14th Howe Awards	Rising Icon	—N/a	Won	
