= Bhobdhama Hansa =

Thai actor (born 2005)

- พบธรรม หรรษา
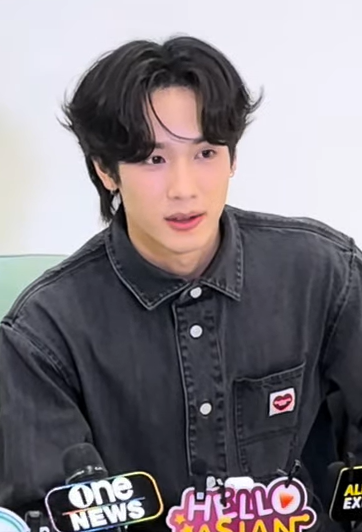
- Bhobdhama in 2026
- Born: 28 September 2005 (age 21); Thailand
- Other name: Java (จาว่า)
- Education: Saint Gabriel's College
- Occupation: Actor
- Years active: 2023–present
- Agent: GMMTV (2023–present)
- Known for: Van in Head 2 Head; Oh in MuTeLuv
- Height: 179 cm (5 ft 10 in)
- Website: GMMTV Artists

Bhobdhama Hansa (Thai: พบธรรม หรรษา; born 28 September 2005), nicknamed Java (Thai: จาว่า), is a Thai actor under GMMTV. He made his television debut in 2023 with supporting roles in A Boss and a Babe and Midnight Museum. In 2025, he appeared in Head 2 Head. In 2026, he starred in MuTeLuv: Love Me If You Swear alongside Surf Patchara, and will star in Roommate Chaos (2026).

== Early life and education ==
Bhobdhama finished his secondary education at Saint Gabriel's College.

== Career ==
Bhobdhama began acting in 2023. His first role was Thup in A Boss and a Babe. The same year, he appeared in one episode of Midnight Museum as Auto.

In 2024, he played Tan in Summer Night (TV series), where he was paired with actor Phudtripart Bhudthonamochai (Ryu).

In 2025, he had a supporting role as Van in Head 2 Head, where he was paired with actor Patchara Silapasoonthorn (Surf).

In 2026, he starred in his first leading role in MuTeLuv: Love Me If You Swear, playing Oh, the leader of the Pathumphaisan gang. The series was part of GMMTV's anthology project Mu-Te-Luv. Initially, the series was set to star Pawat Chittsawangdee (Ohm) and Thanaphon U-sinsap (Leng). Also in 2026, he is set to play Vaja in Roommate Chaos and Zippo in Match Point.

== Filmography ==
=== Television series ===
Key
†	Denotes television productions that have not yet been released

Year	Title	Role	Notes	Network	Ref.
2023	A Boss and a Babe	Thup	Supporting role	GMM 25	
2023	Midnight Museum	Auto	Guest role	GMM 25	
2024	Summer Night	Tan	Supporting role	GMM 25	
2025	Head 2 Head	Van	Supporting role	GMM 25	
2026	MuTeLuv: Love Me If You Swear	"Oh" Christopher Boonying	Main role	GMM 25	
2026	Match Point	Zippo	Supporting role	GMM 25	
TBA	Roommate Chaos †	Vaja	Main role	TBA	
TBA	The Gentlemen's Blood †	Rawit	Main role	TBA	

== Discography ==
=== Collaborations ===
==== Singles ====
Year	Title	Label	Ref.
2026	"เข้าแล้วห้ามออก (No Exit)" with Surf Patchara	GMMTV Records	

==== Soundtrack appearances ====
Year	Title	Soundtrack	Label	Ref.
2025	"เพื่อนข้างๆ (Friend Next Door)" with Surf Patchara	Head 2 Head OST	GMMTV Records	

== Fan meetings ==
Title	Date	Venue	Notes	Ref.
A Boss and a Babe: Final EP. Fan Meeting	May 19, 2023	Siam Pavalai Royal Grand Theater, Siam Paragon	With A Boss and a Babe cast	
Head 2 Head: The First Round	October 18, 2025	9th Fl. Cinema 15, SF World Cinema, Centralworld	With Head 2 Head cast	
Head 2 Head Final EP. Fan Meeting	January 11, 2026	Siam Pavalai Royal Grand Theater, Siam Paragon	With Head 2 Head cast	
Naiin Book Fair 2026	January 25, 2026	Samyan Mitrtown, 5th Fl.	With Surf	
GMMTV Fanival 2026	April 6, 2026	CentralWorld Pulse, 7th Fl.	With Surf	
SurfJava Fan Meeting in Thailand	April 25, 2026	MCC Hall, The Mall Lifestore Bangkae	With Surf	
Summer Love on Java: Java Fan Sign in Shanghai	May 30, 2026	Shanghai, China	—N/a	
GMMTV International Novel Festival 2026	July 27, 2026	Samyan Mitrtown, 5th Fl.	With Surf	
GMMTV International Novel Festival 2026	July 27, 2026	Samyan Mitrtown, 5th Fl.	With Roommate Chaos cast	
GMMTV Fanival: Happy Family	October 8, 2026	Union Hall, Union Mall	With Surf	
GMMTV Fan Day 2027: Taipei	April 17–18, 2027	Zepp New Taipei, Honhui Plaza	With Surf	
