= Weirdo-101 =

2026 Thai television series

- Official series poster
- Thai: แรงโน้มถ่วงระหว่างเรา
- Genre: Romance; Boys' love
- Based on: แรงโน้มถ่วงระหว่างเรา by mostlycloudy
- Screenplay by: Thanaporn Phetcharas; Kirati Kumsat
- Directed by: Weerachit Thongjila
- Starring: Dechchart Tasilp; Suvijak Piyanopharoj
- Composer: Prathaet Indum
- Country of origin: Thailand
- Original language: Thai
- No. of episodes: 10

Production
- Executive producers: Sataporn Panichraksapong; Darapa Choeysanguan
- Producers: Champun Phanachotiwat; Nuttapong Mongkolsawas; Supaporn Lertthitiverakarn
- Cinematography: Thanawat Surapong
- Running time: 43–48 minutes
- Production companies: GMMTV; H8 Studio

Original release
- Network: One 31; TrueVisions Now
- Release: 14 August – 16 October 2026

Weirdo-101 (Thai: แรงโน้มถ่วงระหว่างเรา; RTGS: Raeng Nom Thuang Rawang Rao, lit. 'The Gravity Between Us') is a 2026 Thai boys' love television series, adapted from the novel of the same name by mostlycloudy, starring Dechchart Tasilp (Sea) and Suvijak Piyanopharoj (Keen).

Directed by Weerachit Thongjila and produced by GMMTV and H8 Studio, the series was announced at the GMMTV 2026: Magic Vibes Maximized event on 25 November 2025.

The series premiered on One 31 and TrueVisions Now on 14 August 2026, airing on Fridays at 20:30 ICT.

== Synopsis ==
Niran (Suvijak Piyanopharoj), a school judo athlete who lives day by day, meets Cheewa (Dechchart Tasilp), a genius nerd from the astronomy club who has unique ideas and a ways of communicating. A relationship that begins with mutual confusion escalates when Niran saves Cheewa from a senior. Now Cheewa is flirting with Niran openly in his own way and Niran's own feelings have him confused.

== Cast and characters ==
=== Main ===
- Dechchart Tasilp (Sea) as Parncheewa (Cheewa)
- Suvijak Piyanopharoj (Keen) as Phiangniran Kittimetee (Niran)

=== Supporting ===
- Ratiphat Luengvoraphan (Aston) as Thara
- Ochiris Suwanacheep (Aungpao) as Hemaraj (Hem)
- Peerakan Teawsuwan (Ashi) as Thipok (Pok)
- Natarit Worakornlertsith (Marc) as Oy
- Teepakron Kwanboon (Prom) as Naw
- Niti Chaichitathorn (Pompam) as Teacher Boriboon
- Thinnaphan Tantui (Thor) as Coach Ong
- Chayuth Gorsurat (Titan) as Newton
- Phakawat Tangchatkeaw (Tor) as Jomyut
- Dom Hetrakul as Niran's father
- Natrika Thampridanant (Nampung) as Niran's mother
- Natphichamon Singkornwat (Yongyee) as Auntie Tang
- Anakin Maxwell Chang as Niran (young) (Ep. 8–9)
- Padchun Hiranprateep (Chun) as Cheewa (young) (Ep. 9)

=== Guest ===
- Tawinan Anukoolprasert (Sea) as Cheewin (Ep. 5–6, 9)

== Soundtrack ==
Weirdo-101 Soundtrack
No.	Title	Writer(s)	Artist	Length
1.	"Gravity (โน้ม)"	Tabeazy	Sea Dechchart; Keen Suvijak	3:29
2.	"Beside You (วอนขอดาว)"	Tabeazy	Sea Dechchart; Keen Suvijak	3:35

== Production ==
After the series was announced at the GMMTV 2026: Magic Vibes Maximized event on 25 November 2025. The script reading for the series began on 16 April 2026, and costume fitting was held on 30 April 2026. Principal photography began on 16 May 2026.
