= The Hidden Moon =

- เดือนพราง
- Genre: Boys' love; Romantic drama; Fantasy
- Written by: Supicha Anantachat
- Directed by: Intorn Lokaew
- Starring: Thanachai Sakchaicharoenkul; David Matthew Roberts
- Country of origin: Thailand
- Original language: Thai
- No. of seasons: 1
- No. of episodes: 10

Production
- Running time: 45 minutes
- Production company: MGY Entertainment

Original release
- Network: One 31; WeTV
- Release: September 7 – November 9, 2024

The Hidden Moon (Thai: เดือนพราง; RTGS: Duean Phrang) is a Thai Boys' love fantasy television series produced by MGY Entertainment. Directed by Intorn Lokaew and written by Supicha Anantachat, it stars Thanachai Sakchaicharoenkul (Kin) and David Matthew Roberts in the lead roles.

The series premiered on One 31 on 7 September 2024 and was simultaneously released in its uncut version on WeTV.

== Synopsis ==
The story follows Khen, an ordinary young man in the present day who begins to see and hear supernatural phenomena after being involved in an accident. During these events, he meets Matthew "Mas" Coleridge, the son of the owner of a traditional Thai house during World War I. Bound together by a mysterious fate and the shared meaning of their names, the two develop a deep relationship while confronting the supernatural secrets surrounding their lives.

== Cast ==
=== Main ===
- Thanachai Sakchaicharoenkul (Kin) as Khen
- David Matthew Roberts as Matthew "Mas" Coleridge

=== Supporting ===
- Napakawat Kettreekorn (Santa) as Bing
- Patittada Photajareon (Tonkla) as To
- Nuttapong Phaojinda (Jimmy) as Thaen
- Panichada Kongsawanya (Xobam) as Namwa
- Atcharee Buakhiao (Tian) as Khampuan
- Kansuda Chanakeeree (Meme) as Sompho
- Kamonpop Kaewdiao (Pom) as Aisaeng

== Soundtrack ==
Title	Artist	Length
"Lao Duang Duean" (ลาวดวงเดือน)	Tawitch (Chaiyatuch Sreetongbai)	3:56
"Last Rain" (ฝนสุดท้าย)	Tawitch	4:06

== Awards and nominations ==
Year	Award	Category	Result
2025	Thailand Y Content Awards 2024	Best Art Direction	Nominated
2025	Thailand Y Content Awards 2024	Best Costume Design	Won
