= Roommate Chaos =

Thai upcoming television series

- Official pilot poster
- Thai: หอในหัวใจวุ่นรัก
- Genre: Romantic comedy; Boys' love
- Based on: "Rak-Thasat 311" (รักฐศาสตร์ 311), "Nithetsat 224" (นิเทศศาสตร์ 224), and "Sathapat 510" (สถาปัตย์ 510) by JittiRain
- Screenplay by: Nichaphat Buranadilok; Pongsate Lucksameepong
- Directed by: Pinya Chookamsri
- Starring: Pakin Kunaanuwit; Thipakorn Thitathan; Patchara Silapasoonthorn; Bhobdhama Hansa; Save Saisawat; Naruth Prateeppavameta
- Country of origin: Thailand
- Original language: Thai

Production
- Production companies: GMMTV; Chamade Film

Roommate Chaos (Thai: หอในหัวใจวุ่นรัก) is an upcoming Thai boys' love series starring Pakin Kunaanuwit (Mark), Thipakorn Thitathan (Ohm), Patchara Silapasoonthorn (Surf), Bhobdhama Hansa (Java), Save Saisawat and Naruth Prateeppavameta (Franc).

Based on the webnovels "Rak-Thasat 311" (รักฐศาสตร์ 311), "Nithetsat 224" (นิเทศศาสตร์ 224), and "Sathapat 510" (สถาปัตย์ 510) by JittiRain, it is set to be directed by Pinya Chookamsri and produced by GMMTV and Gemmistry Studio. It was announced on 25 November 2025 during GMMTV's 'Magic Vibes Maximised' event.

== Synopsis ==
Three couples who share dorm rooms find themselves beginning to develop unexpected feelings - A prodigy student who loves to party and the strict dorm supervisor. Two actors who are cast to lead a BL stage play together, and two complete opposites; one is a morning person, the other is a night owl.

== Cast and characters ==
=== Main ===
- Pakin Kunaanuwit (Mark) as Kiattiphum (Pao)
- Thipakorn Thitathan (Ohm) as Thia
- Patchara Silapasoonthorn (Surf) as Prat
- Bhobdhama Hansa (Java) as Vaja
- Save Saisawat as Monthol
- Naruth Prateeppavameta (Franc) as Sol

=== Supporting ===
- Chayakorn Jutamas (AJ) as Bun
- Teepakron Kwanboon (Prom) as Mai
- Napapat Sattha-atikom (Chelsea)
- Kridchayaan Attavipach (Prom)
- Tiranat Kittisattho (Juno)
- Nippitcha Pipitdaecha (Paeyah)

== Novel release ==
The novel release is separated into three separate novels focusing on a different couple within the series; Lovetic Science 313 (PaoThia), Heartification 214 (PratVaja) and Soulstructure 510 (MontholSol). They are a novelisation of the events within the series and not a one-to-one copy of the original webnovels.
