= Chitose Is in the Ramune Bottle =

Japanese light novel series

- Cover of the first light novel volume, featuring Yuuko Hiiragi

千歳くんはラムネ瓶のなか (Chitose-kun wa Ramune Bin no Naka)
- Genre: Romantic comedy
- Light novel
- Written by: Hiromu
- Illustrated by: raemz
- Published by: Shogakukan
- English publisher: NA: Yen Press
- Imprint: Gagaga Bunko
- Original run: June 18, 2019 – present
- Volumes: 9 + 3 short story collections
- Manga
- Written by: Hiromu
- Illustrated by: Bobcat
- Published by: Square Enix
- English publisher: NA: Yen Press
- Magazine: Manga Up!
- Original run: April 12, 2020 – February 8, 2025
- Volumes: 8
- Anime television series
- Directed by: Yūji Tokuno
- Produced by: Satoshi Motonaga; Suguru Saitou; Kazuhiro Kanemitsu; Hiderou Yoshida; Junya Okamoto; Hiroto Utsunomiya; Mako Kouno; Mao Higashi; Aya Iizuka; Soujirou Arimizu
- Written by: Naruhisa Arakawa; Hiromu
- Music by: Yoshiaki Fujisawa
- Studio: Feel
- Licensed by: Remow; SEA: Medialink
- English network: AT-X, Tokyo MX, KBS Kyoto, SUN, FBC, TVA, BS11
- Original run: October 7, 2025 – present
- Episodes: 25
- icon

Chitose Is in the Ramune Bottle (Japanese: 千歳くんはラムネ瓶のなか, Hepburn: Chitose-kun wa Ramune Bin no Naka) is a Japanese light novel series written by Hiromu and illustrated by raemz. Shogakukan published the first volume under its Gagaga Bunko imprint in June 2019. A manga adaptation with illustrations by Bobcat was serialized in Square Enix's Manga Up! from April 2020 to February 2025. An anime television series adaptation produced by Feel premiered in split-cours, with the first cours from October 2025 to March 2026, and the second cours in October 2026.

== Plot ==
Saku Chitose, a popular boy and class president, is the leader of a group of students named Team Chitose. Among its members is Yuuko Hiiragi, a female student who has feelings for him, though he does not reciprocate at all. One day, Saku is asked by a teacher to convince a shut-in student, Kenta Yamazaki, to return to school. The series follows Saku, Yuuko, and the other members of Team Chitose helping other students deal with their problems.

== Characters ==
=== Main characters ===
Saku Chitose (千歳 朔, Chitose Saku)
Voiced by: Junpei Baba (drama CD, audiobooks), Shogo Sakata (anime)
The main protagonist of the series. Renowned for his popularity at Fuji High School, he helms Team Chitose with determination. Once a baseball enthusiast, he now navigates through life with a keen awareness of the affectionate glances cast upon him by the female students. Despite this, Saku remains resolute in his preference for solitude, harboring no desire whatsoever to engage in any romantic entanglements, and has rejected multiple girls, including Yuuko.
Yuuko Hiiragi (柊 夕湖, Hīragi Yūko)
Voiced by: Kana Asumi (drama CD, audiobooks), Manaka Iwami (anime)
One of the members of "Team Chitose" in Class 5. She is renowned for her popularity and striking beauty, qualities that have landed her a spot in the tennis club. Despite her affection for Saku, his feelings do not mirror hers in the slightest. He eventually rejects her, which leaves her devastated; she and the rest of the group begin distancing themselves from him afterwards.
Yua Uchida (内田 優空, Uchida Yua)
Voiced by: Reina Ueda (drama CD, audiobooks), Hina Yōmiya (anime)
One of the members of "Team Chitose" in Class 5. She is an integral member of the brass club, prowess in the saxophone coming naturally to her. Her demeanor is characterized by a gentle grace and an unwavering work ethic, embodying the role of the straight man within Team Chitose.
Haru Aomi (青海 陽, Aomi Haru)
Voiced by: Chinatsu Akasaki (drama CD, audiobooks), Rumi Okubo (anime)
One of the members of "Team Chitose" in Class 5. She is a petite yet vibrant girl who leads Fuji High School's basketball team as the captain. At the beginning of their second-year, she and Yuzuki became the newest members of Team Chitose.
Yuzuki Nanase (七瀬 悠月, Nanase Yuzuki)
Voiced by: Yurina Amami (drama CD, audiobooks), Ikumi Hasegawa (anime)
One of the members of "Team Chitose" in Class 5. She is a versatile, popular, actress-type beauty who shares the spotlight with Yuuko as one of the most admired girls in her year. As a key player on the girls' basketball team, she bonds tightly with Aomi Haru, her teammate, endearingly referring to each other as "Nana" and "Umi." Her demeanor is a blend of gentle grace and effortless cool, with a keen awareness of others' perceptions of her.
Asuka Nishino (西野 明日風, Nishino Asuka)
Voiced by: Kaya Okuno (drama CD, audiobooks), Chika Anzai (anime)
A third-year student at Fuji High School who harbors a profound passion for literature. To Chitose, she stands as an admired senior, sharing facets of her personality that remain hidden from her fellow classmates, all while modestly insisting she is no more than an average individual. Her demeanor is consistently serene and graceful, and her dialogues with Saku often sparkle with poetic language. She aims to become a novelist against the wishes of her strict father. She and Saku are childhood friends, with them meeting a few times a year in the past.

=== Supporting characters ===
Kenta Yamazaki (山崎 健太, Yamazaki Kenta)
Voiced by: Kōki Miyata (drama CD, audiobooks), Masaya Miyazaki (anime)
A student who stopped going to school. He returns to school thanks to Saku's help and develops a friendship with the members of Team Chitose.
Kuranosuke Iwanami (岩波蔵之介, Iwanami Kuranosuke)
Voiced by: Mitsuhiro Sakamaki (drama CD, audiobooks), Yōhei Azakami (anime)
Kazuki Mizushino (水篠和希, Mizushino Kazuki)
Voiced by: Koutaro Nishiyama (drama CD, audiobooks), Shun'ichi Toki (anime)
A popular member from the soccer team.
Kaito Asano (浅野海人, Asano Kaito)
Voiced by: Hayato Kimura (drama CD, audiobooks), Fumiya Imai (anime)
A sporty basketball team member.

== Media ==
=== Light novels ===
Written by Hiromu and illustrated by raemz; the series' first volume was published by Shogakukan under its Gagaga Bunko imprint on June 18, 2019. As of October 2025, nine volumes and three short story volumes have been released.

In July 2021, Yen Press announced that they had licensed the series for English publication.

In 2022, the government of Fukui budgeted JP¥6 million (US$40,500) for a pop-culture tourism campaign collaboration with Chitose Is in the Ramune Bottle.

==== Volumes ====
No.	Original release date	Original ISBN	English release date	English ISBN
1	June 18, 2019	978-4-09-451796-5	March 15, 2022	978-1-9753-3905-0
Prologue: Chitose's Peaceful, Uneventful World; Chapter 1: Popular Bad Boys Do Well in High School; Chapter 2: Kenta Is in His Room; Chapter 3: Let the Mutual Understanding Commence; Chapter 4: The Nail That Sticks Up Gets Hammered Down...?; Chapter 5: A Full Moon, like a Glass Marble Sinking in a Bottle of Ramune Soda; Epilogue: Chitose's Peaceful, Uneventful World, Continued
2	October 18, 2019	978-4-09-451816-0	August 16, 2022	978-1-9753-3906-7
Prologue: The Boy; Chapter 1: A Transient Starting Line; Chapter 2: Auspicious Day and Ordinary Days; Chapter 3: Defined Relationships and Undefined Distances; Chapter 4: A Distant Moon; Epilogue: The Girl
3	April 17, 2020	978-4-09-451841-2	February 21, 2023	978-1-9753-3907-4
Prologue: The Moon That Day; Chapter 1: Rainy with a Chance of Dreams; Chapter 2: Illusions, Drop-kicked; Chapter 3: The Blue Night of the Faraway Sky We'll Remember Someday; Chapter 4: Tomorrow's Breeze; Epilogue: The Moon This Day; Side Story: The King and the Birthday
4	September 18, 2020	978-4-09-451866-5	June 20, 2023	978-1-9753-3908-1
Prologue: The Night Sky I Sought; Chapter 1: Barefoot and Ponytailed in the Pool After School; Chapter 2: Pouting Orihime and Crying Hikoboshi; Chapter 3: Light a Fire in My Heart; Chapter 4: The Sun's Smile; Epilogue: The Blue Sky I Found
5	April 20, 2021	978-4-09-451899-3; 978-4-09-453005-6 (SE)	November 21, 2023	978-1-9753-4795-6
Prologue: What Special Means to Me; Chapter 1: Summer Vacation, Daily Calendar; Chapter 2: Fireworks on a Short Summer Night; Chapter 3: The Cutoff Line Beyond the Waves; Chapter 4: An Evening Lake
6	August 19, 2021	978-4-09-453022-3	April 23, 2024	978-1-9753-4797-0
Prologue: My Normal; Chapter 5: A Kaleidoscope Colored with Scattered Tears; Chapter 6: Us Two Together with No Moon in Sight; Chapter 7: Fires for Returning Spirits, Fires for Departing Spirits; Chapter 8: A Gentle Sky; Epilogue: Your Normal; Epilogue: Your Special
6.5	March 18, 2022	978-4-09-453060-5	September 17, 2024	978-1-9753-6029-0
Chapter 1: A Pinkie Promise from Ten Years Ago, Made on an August Night; Chapter 2: Flowers Bloom from Tears in the End; Chapter 3: His and Hers Seats; Chapter 4: A Bouquet for Raised Hands
7	August 18, 2022	978-4-09-453085-8	October 21, 2025	979-8-8554-0574-3
Chapter 1: Our Own September; Chapter 2: Our Own Kind of Blue; Chapter 3: Our Rightful Places; Chapter 4: When I Get Real; Prologue: Encountering a Hero
8	June 20, 2023	978-4-09-453126-8; 978-4-09-453132-9 (SE)	May 12, 2026	979-8-8554-0576-7
Prologue: Saku Chitose; Chapter 1: Where the Moonlit Shadow Ends; Chapter 2: The Poison Apple and the Night of the Witch
9	August 20, 2024	978-4-09-453203-6	February 9, 2027	979-8-8554-4733-0
DES	August 20, 2025	978-4-09-453257-9	—	—
9.5	October 20, 2025	978-4-09-453266-1	—	—
10	November 18, 2026	978-4-09-453317-0	—	—

=== Manga ===
A manga adaptation, illustrated by Bobcat, was serialized in Square Enix's Manga Up! website from April 12, 2020, to February 8, 2025. Square Enix published the individual chapters in eight tankōbon volumes.

At Anime NYC 2021, Yen Press announced they would also publish the manga adaptation in English.

==== Volumes ====
No.	Original release date	Original ISBN	English release date	English ISBN
1	September 18, 2020	978-4-7575-6849-5	July 12, 2022	978-1-9753-4498-6
1. Saku Chitose is a Total Man-Slut Shithead; 2. After School; 3. A Chance Encounter; 4. Mutual Understanding; Bonus Manga: Summer Dream; Bonus Story: Chitose is Outside the Window
2	February 5, 2021	978-4-7575-7078-8	October 11, 2022	978-1-9753-4500-6
5. Three-Dimensional; 6. Preparations; 7. Hierarchy; 8. Extremely Average; Bonus Story: Outside the House
3	August 19, 2021	978-4-7575-7427-4	May 23, 2023	978-1-9753-6137-2
9. Types of Popular Kids; 10. The Coach and Player; 11. A Relationship of Trust; 12. The Decisive Battle; Bonus Story: A Bun on the Rooftop at Lunch Break
4	March 18, 2022	978-4-7575-7788-6	September 19, 2023	978-1-9753-7151-7
13. Savior; 14. Standing Alone; 15. Transient; 16. Yan High; Bonus Story: A Valentine's Day Any Guy Would Envy; Bonus Story: Poison Apple in the Mirror
5	November 7, 2022	978-4-7575-8233-0	January 23, 2024	978-1-9753-7401-3
17. A Fake Couple's Dilemma; 18. Library; 19. Outburst; 20. Tomoya Naruse; Bonus Story: My Repayment
6	July 6, 2023	978-4-7575-8642-0	June 18, 2024	978-1-9753-9162-1
21. Trepidation; 22. Inside and Out; 23. Yukata Date; 24. Yanashita-Senpai; Bonus Story: A Promise with Nana
7	August 19, 2024	978-4-7575-9334-3	August 26, 2025	979-8-8554-1589-6
25. The Rival; 26. Is This What You Wanted?; 27. Who Scares You More?; 28. Try Not to Think; Bonus Story: A Name Called Out in a Dream
8	March 7, 2025	978-4-7575-9714-3	April 28, 2026	979-8-8554-2656-4
29. Nanase's Resolve; 30. Yuzuki Nanase; 31. It's Just Pain; Final Story: Comparing Notes; Bonus Story: The Princess and the Birthday

=== Anime ===
An anime television series adaptation was announced on August 9, 2024. It is produced by Feel and directed by Yūji Tokuno, with Naruhisa Arakawa handling series composition and writing the scripts alongside Hiromu, Sumie Kinoshita designing the characters, and Yoshiaki Fujisawa composing the music. The series airs in split-cours, with the first cours aired from October 7, 2025, to March 31, 2026, on AT-X and other networks. Episodes 6 and beyond were delayed due to production circumstances; eventually airing with episodes 6 to 10 in December 2025, and episodes 11 to 13 back-to-back on March 31, 2026. The second cours premiered on October 13, 2026. For the first cours, the opening theme song is "Liar" (ライアー, Raiā), performed by Kucci, while the ending theme song is "Kagerō" (陽炎; 'Heat Haze'), performed by Cider Girl. For the second cours, the opening theme song is "Saku" (咲く; 'To Bloom'), performed by Cider Girl, while the ending theme song is "Doko nimo Ikenai Mama" (どこにもいけないまま; 'While I Can't Go Anywhere'), performed by Aruma. Remow licensed the series for streaming on Crunchyroll. Medialink licensed the series in Southeast Asia and Oceania (except Australia and New Zealand) for streaming on Ani-One Asia's YouTube channel.

==== Episodes ====
No.	Title	Directed by	Storyboarded by	Original release date
Part 1
1	"The Hazy Spring Moon Above" "Haru, Miageru Oborozuki" (春、見上げるおぼろ月)	Taichi Yoshizawa & Shinichi Tatsuta	Yūji Tokuno	October 7, 2025
2	"Let's Start Breaking Common Ground" "Sōgo Rikai o Hajimeyō" (相互理解をはじめよう)	Shinichi Tatsuta	Yūji Tokuno & Shinichi Tatsuta	October 14, 2025
3	"A Lonesome Hero" "Hitoribotchi no Hīrō" (ひとりぼっちのヒーロー)	Takafumi Fujii	Satoshi Shimizu & Shinichi Tatsuta	October 21, 2025
4	"The Marble Moon in the Ramune Bottle" "Ramune no Bin ni Shizunda Bīdama no Tsuki" (ラムネの瓶に沈んだビー玉の月)	Takashi Andō	Yūji Tokuno	October 28, 2025
5	"A Fickle Starting Line" "Karisome no Sutāto Rain" (かりそめのスタートライン)	Shōta Imai	Shōta Imai	November 4, 2025
6	"Blue Basketball Shoes" "Aoiro no Basshu" (青色のバッシュ)	Taichi Yoshizawa & Shinichi Tatsuta	Satoshi Shimizu	December 2, 2025
7	"Ups and Downs" "Hare no Hi Ke no Hi" (ハレの日ケの日)	Nao Miyoshi	Gin-san & Shōta Imai	December 9, 2025
8	"How to End the Unending Rain" "Yamanai Ame no Yamasekata" (やまない雨のやませ方)	Taichi Yoshizawa	Tomoki Kobayashi	December 16, 2025
9	"A Relationship with a Name and a Rift Without One" "Namae no Aru Kankei to Namae no Nai Kyori" (名前のあるカンケイと名前のないキョリ)	Takafumi Fujii	Kei Oikawa	December 23, 2025
10	"A Distant Moon" "Haruka na Tsuki" (悠な月)	Tsuyoshi Yamane	Itsuro Kawasaki	December 30, 2025
11	"Rainy with a Chance of..." "Ame, Tokidoki," (雨, ときどき,)	Shinichi Tatsuta & Yūji Tokuno	Nagisa Miyazaki	March 30, 2026
12	"With a Chance of Dreams" "Tokidoki, Yume" (ときどき、夢)	Shōta Imai	Shōta Imai	March 31, 2026
13	"The Left-Ear Promise" "Hidarimimi no Yakusoku" (左耳の約束)	Takafumi Fujii	Minoru Ōhara	March 31, 2026
Part 2
14	"Runaway Senpai and You" "Kimi to Senpai no Kakeochi" (君と先輩の駆け落ち)	Taichi Yoshizawa	Taichi Yoshizawa	October 13, 2026
15	"A Distant Indigo Night, Remembered" "Itsuka Omoidasu Tōku no Sora no Aoi Yoru" (いつか思いだす遠くの空の青い夜)	Shinichi Tatsuta & Jake Marquez	Keiichi Ishikura	October 20, 2026
16	"Tomorrow's Wind" "Ashita no Kaze" (明日の風)	Nao Miyoshi & Yuri Pinzon	Ryūtarō Suzuki	October 27, 2026
17	"The Entrance of Summer" "Natsu no Iriguchi" (夏の入り口)	Taichi Yoshizawa, Lance Fonacier & Neil Lamadrid	Itsuro Kawasaki	November 3, 2026
18	"After-School Pool and Barefoot Ponytail" "Hōkago Pūru ni Hadashi no Ponītēru" (放課後プールに裸足のポニーテール)	Shōta Imai	Kei Oikawa	November 10, 2026
19	"The Swing of Promise under the Starry Sky" "Hoshizora ni Chikai Basho, Futari no Yakusoku Buranko" (星空に近い場所、ふたりの約束ブランコ)	Shinichi Tatsuta, Jake Marquez & Clarence Bay	Tetsuo Hirakawa & Shinichi Tatsuta	November 17, 2026
20	"The Steaming Orihime and the Moping Hikoboshi" "Punpun Orihime to Shikushiku Hikoboshi" (ぷんぷん織り姫としくしく彦星)	Takafumi Fujii	Shinsuke Yanagi	November 24, 2026

==== Special episode ====
No.	Title	Original release date
13.5	"Recap"	October 6, 2026
A recap episode summarizing the events of the first thirteen episodes before the start of the second cour.

== Reception ==
In the Kono Light Novel ga Sugoi! guidebook, the series ranked first in the bunkobon category in 2021 and 2022. The series has over 280,000 copies in circulation.

== See also ==
- Even a Replica Can Fall in Love, another light novel series with the same illustrator
- Love Unseen Beneath the Clear Night Sky, another light novel series with the same illustrator
