= Thanachai Sakchaicharoenkul =

Thai actor, singer and ice hockey player (born 2004)

- ธนชัย ศักดิ์ชัยเจริญกุล
- Born: 26 June 2004 (age 22); Thailand
- Other name: Kin (คิน)
- Education: Anglo Singapore International School; Kasetsart University
- Occupations: Actor; singer; ice hockey player
- Years active: 2022–present
- Agents: White Fox (2022–2025); GMMTV (2025–present)
- Sports career
- Height: 1.75 m (5 ft 9 in)
- Sport: Ice hockey
Medal record
Ice hockey
Representing Thailand
Asia and Oceania Championship
Gold medal – first place	2022 Bangkok	National junior team
2025 SEA Games
Silver medal – second place	2025 Bangkok	Men's national team

Thanachai Sakchaicharoenkul (Thai: ธนชัย ศักดิ์ชัยเจริญกุล; born 26 June 2004), nicknamed Kin (Thai: คิน), is a Thai actor, singer and ice hockey player. He is best known for his roles in The Hidden Moon (2024) and You Maniac (2026), as well as being a three-time ice hockey champion at the South East Asia Youth Cup from 2017 to 2019.

== Early life and education ==
Thanachai was born in Thailand on 26 June 2004. He studied kindergarten at Lertlah School Kaset-Nawamin Road, and then studied his elementary education at Saint Gabriel's College. He graduated from Anglo Singapore International School, he went on to study arts in Entrepreneurial Economics with a master's degree in economics at Kasetsart University's Faculty of Economics. In addition to Thai, he speaks Chinese and English.

== Career ==
Debuting his music career under the label White Fox, he released his first EP Adrenaline in 2022. He left White Fox and signed with GMMTV in July 2025 and is set to star in the upcoming boys' love television series Kiss Me, Remember? alongside acting partner Tinnasit Isarapongporn (Barcode).

He is also an accompliced ice hockey player. Currently on the Thailand men's national ice hockey team, he is a three-time ice hockey champion at the South East Asia Youth Cup from 2017 to 2019 and participated in the Winter Olympic qualifiers. Thanachai was awarded the National Outstanding Youth Awards in sports for bringing many medals to the country in 2018 and 2021. The Creative Child and Youth Development Club of Thailand selected him to be one of the judges for the Thailand Master Youth 2020–2021 in sports.

== Filmography ==
=== Television series ===
Key
†	Denotes television productions that have not yet been released

Year	Title	Role	Network	Notes	Ref.
2023	Love Hurts	Banthao (young)	One 31	Guest role	
2024	The Hidden Moon	Khen	One 31	Main role	
2026	You Maniac	Pun	GMM 25	Supporting role	
TBA	Kiss Me, Remember? †	Kit	TBA	Main role	
TBA	Shrimply Mine †	Kung	TBA	Main role	

=== Music video appearances ===
Year	Title	Artist(s)	Label	Ref.
2025	"หน้าเบลอหลังชัด (Foreground)"	LYKN	Riser Music	

== Discography ==
=== Singles ===
==== Digital singles ====
Year	Title	Album	Label	Ref.
2022	"Yoo Kon Deaw Mun Ngao"	Adrenaline	White Fox	
2022	"Phit Ka Ti Ka"	Adrenaline	White Fox	
2022	"Huang Dai Mai"	Adrenaline	White Fox	
2022	"Wasn't Right (รู้ตัวเมื่อสาย)"	Adrenaline	White Fox	
2022	"Don't Stop Baby"	Adrenaline	White Fox	
2023	"Paper Plane" feat. OG Bobby	Hotel Fox	White Fox	
2024	"แอบรัก (เพื่อนรัก)"	—N/a	White Fox	
2024	"อยากมีเธอใกล้ๆ" feat. Tad Atlas	—N/a	White Fox	

===== Collaborations =====
Year	Title	Label	Ref.
2022	"Wow Wow Wow (ติดว้าวล้าวอ่ะ)" with Wonderframe, Engfa	White Fox	

===== Soundtrack appearances =====
Year	Title	Album	Label	Ref.
2026	"รักกันได้ยัง (Approved?)" with Barcode Tinnasit	You Maniac OST	GMMTV Records	

== Fan meetings ==
Title	Date	Venue	Notes	Ref.
You Maniac: Opening Night	29 August 2026	MCC Hall 3rd Fl. The Mall Lifestore Bangkapi	With You Maniac cast	
GMMTV Fanival: Happy Family	11 October 2026	Union Hall, Union Mall	With Barcode	
You Maniac Final Ep. Fan Meeting	31 October 2026	Union Hall, Union Mall	With You Maniac cast	
