= Ice hockey at the 2025 SEA Games =

Ice hockey at the 2025 Southeast Asian Games – Men's tournament
Tournament details
- Host country: Thailand
- Venue: 1 (in 1 host city)
- Teams: 5

Final positions
- Champions: Indonesia (1st title)
- Runners-up: Thailand
- Third place: Philippines

Tournament statistics
- Games played: 14
- Goals scored: 126 (9 per game)

Ice hockey at the 2025 Southeast Asian Games – Women's tournament
Tournament details
- Host country: Thailand
- Venue: 1 (in 1 host city)
- Teams: 4

Final positions
- Champions: Thailand (1st title)
- Runners-up: Philippines
- Third place: Singapore

Tournament statistics
- Games played: 10
- Goals scored: 102 (10.2 per game)

The ice hockey competition at the 2025 SEA Games in Thailand was held at the Thailand International Ice Hockey Arena in Bangkok.

== Participating nations ==
Nation	Men	Women
Indonesia	Yes	No
Malaysia	Yes	Yes
Philippines	Yes	Yes
Singapore	Yes	Yes
Thailand	Yes	Yes
Total: 5 NOCs	5	4

== Medal table ==
* Host nation (Thailand)

Rank	Nation	Gold	Silver	Bronze	Total
1	Thailand*	1	1	0	2
2	Indonesia	1	0	0	1
3	Philippines	0	1	1	2
4	Singapore	0	0	1	1
Totals (4 entries)		2	2	2	6

== Medalists ==
Event	Gold	Silver	Bronze
Men's tournament	Indonesia; Adel Khabibullin; Aditia Sutanto; Ammar Rafandra Saputro; Anryan Saputra; Artem Bezrukov; Arthur Jordan; Daffa Abyan Bagaskara; Daffa Fadilla; Evgenii Nurislamov; Faigan Alghani; Haykal Kaykobad Hasyim; Izzan Labib Rais; Jeremiah Ong Praptasuganda; Jonathan Ryan Ferry Nugraha; Lucas Nathaniel Valiant Salomo; Muchammad Athalaa Alqaeda; Muhamad Arsky Jayden Zen Naga; Muhammad Abyan Putra Arlan; Raihan Jufino Hafiz; Rizqi Akira Rachman Prijanto; Ronald Wijaya; Sangga Munggaran Putra; Savelii Molchanov	Thailand; Kim Juhani Aarola; Tewin Chartsuwan; Patrick Forstner; Jan Mikael Isaksson; Chayaphon Jaratkorn; Masato Kitayama; Phandaj Khuhakaew; Ken Edvin Kindborn; Benjamin David Kleineschay; Thananutch Kulthanthorn; Nicholas Charles Lampson; Tanat Limpanyakul; Chanokchon Limpinphet; Hideki Nagayama; Vijak Niyomvong; Natapat Patong; Teerasak Rattanachot; Thanachai Sakchaicharoenkul; Suwichak Suttigarn; Papan Thanakroekkiat; Pattarapol Ungkulpattanasuk; Araya Vatanapanyakul; Natchayatorn Yannakornthanapunt	Philippines; Patrick Daniel Abis; Manvil Billones; Carlo Emmanuel de Guzman; John Steven Füglister; Johann Sebastien Garcia; Francois Emmanuel Gautier; Einzenn Ham; Benjamin Jorge Imperial; Jean Gabriel Isidoro; John Glenn Lagleva; Lenard Rigel Lancero II; Mikel Sean Miller; Jared Julian Nery; Dan Carlo Pastrana; Jan Aro Regencia; Jaiden Mackale Roxas; Eishner Jigsmac Sibug; Jann Gefrey So Tiong; Paolo Spafford; Kenwrick Sze; Carlo Angelo Tigaronita
Women's tournament	Thailand; Varachanant Boonyubol; Marisa Chimpradid; Prim Dejthai; Sirikarn Jittresin; Apichaya Kosanunt; Thamida Kunthadapakorn; Nisthanant Loykulnant; Natthaporn Nakdee; Kelly Zi-Ching Pan; Suwipa Panyamaneerat; Pondnatcha Phalitphonkarnpim; Rinrada Poka; Nuchanat Ponglerkdee; Avita Pothong; Wirasinee Rattananai; Pawarisa Sakchaicharoenkul; Thitaree Satityathiwat; Kunkanchaya Swasdiparp; Supitsara Thamma; Kunlarchar Thanyalakpark; Pacharamon Vorawat; Wilaksaya Watthanakulcharoenchai; Thipwarintorn Yannakornthanapunt	Philippines; Jasmin Cian Alcido; Rhianne Hailie Jade Alix; Rangel Dex Benitez; Rita Ann Ceguerra; Kamil Cubillo; Bianca Yasmine Cuevas; Jodi Catherine Dino; Nicole Embalzado; Gabrielle Formoso-Laysico; Shaden Joy Ganac; Gerardine Ling Go; Danielle Lourdes Imperial; Illeana Venice Jimenez; Mikaella Zabrina Anne Lee; Rosalyn Elizabeth Angelina Lim; Cassia Zeth Marino; Larissa Mia Pagdato; Mikayla Dominique Pe Aguirre; Georgie Ann Regencia; Alyssa Candace Sanchez; Kimberly Athenna Sze; Kathleen Nadine Tan; Nikka Marie Villanueva	Singapore; Monica Chang; Kiarra Chin Hui Xian; Lovinia Laurentia Choe Jin Wei; Jessica Chua Yi Ping; Foo Qina; Alexia Goh Tsui Ean; Alyssa Goh Tsui Kay; Josephine Hamnett; Eva Jin Zhiyan; Emily Kwek Wei Wei; Faith Lee Duan Yi; Geraldine Shyan Lim Hui Tzer; Jaslyn Lim Pan Yu; Lim Wen Lin; Janis Mak Shu Yin; Tiffany Ong Zi Ting; Brianna Nicole Punsalan Tan; Genevieve Tan; Melissa Tan Wei Ting; Arabel Yap Shi Mei; Tiffany Anne Yeoh Hui Ting; Yew Lim Fong

== Men's tournament ==
=== Preliminary round ===
Pos	Team	Pld	W	OTW	OTL	L	GF	GA	GD	Pts	Qualification
1	Indonesia	4	3	1	0	0	24	8	+16	11	Semifinals
2	Thailand (H)	4	3	0	1	0	31	6	+25	10	Semifinals
3	Philippines	4	2	0	0	2	15	19	−4	6	Semifinals
4	Singapore	4	1	0	0	3	13	24	−11	3	Semifinals
5	Malaysia	4	0	0	0	4	10	36	−26	0	

Source: 2025 SEA Games
(H) Host

9 December; 17:00	Indonesia	6–1 (2–1, 1–0, 3–0)	Singapore	Thailand International Ice Hockey Arena

Game reference

9 December; 20:30	Philippines	7–2 (2–2, 2–0, 3–0)	Malaysia	Thailand International Ice Hockey Arena

Game reference

11 December; 16:00	Indonesia	5–1 (2–0, 2–0, 1–1)	Philippines	Thailand International Ice Hockey Arena

Game reference

11 December; 19:30	Thailand	14–0 (5–0, 5–0, 4–0)	Malaysia	Thailand International Ice Hockey Arena

Game reference

13 December; 16:00	Singapore	4–7 (1–2, 1–3, 2–2)	Philippines	Thailand International Ice Hockey Arena

Game reference

13 December; 19:30	Thailand	2–3 OT (1–0, 0–0, 1–2) (OT: 0–1)	Indonesia	Thailand International Ice Hockey Arena

Game reference

14 December; 16:00	Malaysia	4–10 (3–1, 1–5, 0–4)	Indonesia	Thailand International Ice Hockey Arena

Game reference

14 December; 19:30	Thailand	7–3 (0–1, 3–1, 4–1)	Singapore	Thailand International Ice Hockey Arena

Game reference

16 December; 16:00	Singapore	5–4 (1–1, 1–1, 3–2)	Malaysia	Thailand International Ice Hockey Arena

Game reference

16 December; 19:30	Thailand	8–0 (1–0, 3–0, 4–0)	Philippines	Thailand International Ice Hockey Arena

Game reference

=== Knockout stage ===
Semi-finals
17 December
Indonesia	8
Singapore	3
17 December
Thailand	8
Philippines	1

Gold medal match
19 December
Indonesia	3
Thailand	2
Third place
18 December
Singapore	3
Philippines	5

==== Semifinals ====
17 December; 17:00	Indonesia	8–3	Singapore	Thailand International Ice Hockey Arena

Game reference

17 December; 20:30	Thailand	8–1	Philippines	Thailand International Ice Hockey Arena

Game reference

==== Bronze medal game ====
18 December; 19:00	Singapore	3–5	Philippines	Thailand International Ice Hockey Arena

Game reference

==== Gold medal game ====
19 December; 19:00	Indonesia	3–2	Thailand	Thailand International Ice Hockey Arena

Game reference

== Women's tournament ==
=== Squads ===
Malaysia (MAS)	Philippines (PHI)	Thailand (THA)	Singapore (SGP)
Low Chloe Mei Xuen; Nurul Aliya Versluis; Adilah Junid; Erina Wanzul; Wan Mei Wah; Eunice Boon; Nur Iman Sofiah Nur Aziz; Zaira Rahman Abdulla; Jia Wen Carmen Lee; Yasmin Zainol Kamal; Tan Sie Ru; Arissa Amir; Nur Illina Mohd Rothi; Hadiya Madihah Hazurin; Athira Adrianna Mohd Anuar, Lee Jing Yee; Putri Nurtasha Mohd Khan; Aisyah Farah Azra; Low Wen Min; Fatin Najwa Muhd Fadzli Amin; Nabilah Shaharudin; Zara Batrisha Ahmad Jamal Omar	Gerardine Go; Rangel Benitez; Cassia Marino; Bianca Cuevas; Danielle Imperial; Jodi Dino; Rhianne Hailie Alix; Georgie Ann Regencia; Rita Ceguerra; Illeana Jimenez; Larissa Pagdato; Kathleen Tan; Nikka Villanueva; Rosalyn Lim; Mikayla Pe Aguirre; Gabrielle Formoso-Laysico; Mikaella Lee; Kimberly Sze; Shaden Joy Ganac; Kamil Cubillo; Jasmin Cian Alcido; Alyssa Candace Sanchez	Thamida Kunthadapakorn; Nuchanat Ponglerkdee; Avita Pothong; Supitsara Thamma; Pacharamon Vorawat; Pondnatcha Phalitphonkarnpim; Apichaya Kosanunt; Marisa Chimpradid; Pawarisa Sakchaicharoenkul; Rinrada Poka; Kunkanchaya Swasdiparp; Suwipa Panyamaneerat; Thipwarintorn Yannakornthanapunt; Varachanant Boonyubol; Nisthanant Loykulnant; Thitaree Satityathiwat; Wirasinee Rattananai; Prim Dejthai; Kelly Zi-Ching Pan; Sirikarn Jittresin; Kunlarchar Thanyalakpark; Wilaksaya Watthanakulcharoenchai	Melissa Tan; Monica Chang; Janis Mak; Tiffany Ong; Geraldine Lim; Kristy Yew; Genevieve Tan; Lovinia Choe; Jessica Chua; Kiarra Chin; Jaslyn Lim; Zhiyan Eva Jin; Arabel Yap; Lim Wen Lin; Josephine Hamnett; Brianna Tan; Faith Lee; Tiffany Yeoh; Alyssa Goh; Emily Kwek; Alexia Goh; Qina Foo

=== Preliminary round ===
Pos	Team	Pld	W	OTW	OTL	L	GF	GA	GD	Pts	Qualification
1	Thailand (H)	3	3	0	0	0	39	0	+39	9	Semifinals
2	Philippines	3	2	0	0	1	11	14	−3	6	Semifinals
3	Singapore	3	1	0	0	2	5	12	−7	3	Semifinals
4	Malaysia	3	0	0	0	3	1	30	−29	0	Semifinals

Updated to match(es) played on unknown. Source: IIHF
(H) Host

10 December; 10:00	Malaysia	1–4 (0–0, 1–1, 0–3)	Singapore	Thailand International Ice Hockey Arena

Game reference

10 December; 13:30	Philippines	0–13 (0–7, 0–2, 0–4)	Thailand	Thailand International Ice Hockey Arena

Game reference

12 December; 16:00	Philippines	3–1 (1–1, 1–0, 1–0)	Singapore	Thailand International Ice Hockey Arena

Game reference

12 December; 19:30	Malaysia	0–18 (0–4, 0–6, 0–8)	Thailand	Thailand International Ice Hockey Arena

Game reference

15 December; 16:00	Philippines	8–0 (2–0, 5–0, 1–0)	Malaysia	Thailand International Ice Hockey Arena

Game reference

15 December; 19:30	Singapore	0–8 (0–4, 0–2, 0–2)	Thailand	Thailand International Ice Hockey Arena

Game reference

=== Knockout stage ===
Semi-finals
17 December
Thailand	19
Malaysia	0
17 December
Philippines	6
Singapore	2

Gold medal match
19 December
Thailand	13
Philippines	4
Third place
18 December
Malaysia	0
Singapore	2

==== Semifinals ====
17 December; 10:00	Philippines	6–2 (2–1, 0–0, 4–1)	Singapore	Thailand International Ice Hockey Arena

17 December; 13:30	Thailand	19–0 (4–0, 10–0, 5–0)	Malaysia	Thailand International Ice Hockey Arena

Game reference

==== Bronze medal game ====
18 December; 13:00	Malaysia	0–2	Singapore	Thailand International Ice Hockey Arena

Game reference

==== Gold medal game ====
19 December; 13:00	Thailand	13–4	Philippines	Thailand International Ice Hockey Arena

Game reference
