= A Dog and a Plane =

2026 Thai television series

- Official series poster
- Thai: หมาเห่าเครื่องบิน
- Genre: Boys' love; Romantic comedy
- Screenplay by: Tichakorn Phukhaotong; Pratchaya Thavornthummarut
- Directed by: Tichakorn Phukhaotong
- Starring: Tawan Vihokratana; Thitipoom Techaapaikhun
- Opening theme: "กู้ภัยกู้ใจ (Rescue You)" by Tay Tawan
- Ending theme: "กู้ภัยกู้ใจ (Rescue You)" by Tay Tawan (Ep. 1–2); "Fly With Me, Free My Heart" by New Thitipoom (Ep. 3–10)
- Country of origin: Thailand
- Original language: Thai
- No. of episodes: 10

Production
- Executive producers: Sataporn Panichraksapong; Darapa Choeysanguan
- Producers: Jutamas Khawchat; Noppharnach Chaiyahwimhon; Rabob Pokanngaen
- Cinematography: Pongthorn Thongwattana; Rath Roongrueangtantisook; Surasak Sakunrueang
- Running time: 45–60 minutes
- Production companies: GMMTV; Chamade Film

Original release
- Network: One 31; TrueVisions Now
- Release: 29 May – 31 July 2026

A Dog and a Plane (Thai: หมาเห่าเครื่องบิน; RTGS: Ma Hao Khrueang Bin; lit. 'A Dog Barks at an Airplane') is a 2026 Thai boys' love television series, starring Tawan Vihokratana (Tay) and Thitipoom Techaapaikhun (New). The series premiered on One 31 on 29 May 2026, airing on Fridays at 20:30 ICT, and was made available for streaming on TrueVisions Now.

Directed by Tichakorn Phukhaotong and produced by GMMTV together with Chamade Film, it was announced during the GMMTV 2025: Riding the Wave event held on 26 November 2024.

== Synopsis ==
The life of Khanit (Thitipoom Techaapaikhun), a perfect young flight attendant, intersects with Toto (Tawan Vihokratana), the quirky head of a rescue unit who lives the complete opposite life. Their paths cross repeatedly, starting with a small incident of accidentally switching suitcases, escalating into a major conflict where Toto has to help Khanit catch Lion (Oabnithi Wiwattanawarang), a handsome captain and Khanit's boyfriend, cheating on him. What will happen in the chaotic story of a mission to catch an adulterer that turns rescue operations into a heart-healing adventure?

== Cast and characters ==
=== Main ===
- Tawan Vihokratana (Tay) as Phanuphong Khomklao (Toto)
- Thitipoom Techaapaikhun (New) as Khanit Sakdatawee

=== Supporting ===
- Tanutchai Wijitvongtong (Mond) as Chatchai Phimaimueang (Akki / Ki)
- Phudtripart Bhudthonamochai (Ryu) as Tanveha Wongsuksawat (Veha)
- Oabnithi Wiwattanawarang (Oab) as Lion
- Chayatorn Trairattanapradit (Tui) as Thirawat Chaemthai (Beer)
- Ploynira Hiruntaveesin (Kapook) as Phailin Piengporjai

=== Guest ===
- Tiranat Kittisattho (Juno) as Chanon Jairakman (Ja-o)
- Srisirin Vichayasut (Artist) as Tonlew Khomklao (Lew)
- Thipakorn Thitathan (Ohm) as Por
- Niti Chaichitathorn (Pompam) as Je Zo
- Jumpol Thongtan (Gokhai) as Khanit's father

== Episodes ==
No.	Title	Original release date
1	"Episode 1"	29 May 2026
After a series of run-ins and misunderstandings, Khanit bails Toto, Akki and Beer out of jail. In exchange, Toto must agree to help Khanit figure out if his boyfriend Lion is secretly cheating on him as a way to fulfill his debt.
2	"Episode 2"	5 June 2026
The EMT trio are tight on money and are signed as performers for a bachelorette party. Veha is tricked into letting Akki hit on him. Toto is absolutely certain that Lion is secretly cheating on Khanit, with the duo tailing the suspicious captain all day until Khanit confronts him.
3	"Episode 3"	12 June 2026
Toto and Akki bring Ja-o along for their next investigation into Lion. Khanit enlists Toto to help him study for an upcoming exam that will allow him to fly internationally. Akki tries to guilt Veha into learning some morality. Toto gives Lion one chance to make things right.
4	"Episode 4"	19 June 2026
Khanit is ready to exact revenge on Lion and Toto is all too eager to help. Akki realises he and Veha have some unresolved history. Beer is out on a secret mission of his own. Akki tries to help Veha one more time. Toto enlists all his friends to help plan their revenge.
5	"Episode 5"	26 June 2026
Toto is determined to help Khanit get over Lion and takes him for a night on the town. Akki is worried for Veha's mental state and breaks into his apartment. When Toto and Akki accidentally bring the wounded lovers to the same place, a fight breaks out.
6	"Episode 6"	3 July 2026
Khanit decides to cut off Toto's debt entirely, much to the latter's dismay. Akki discovers Veha's childhood diary and has a realisation. Toto will stop at nothing to become the new man in Khanit's heart. Akki is determined to make up for how he treated Veha in the past.
7	"Episode 7"	10 July 2026
Khanit's family still think he is dating Lion, so he and Toto hatch a plan to turn Toto into "Captain Thee". Akki cannot understand why liking Veha for his looks is a bad thing. Toto knocks it out of the park with impressing Khanit's family, but circumstances arise.
8	"Episode 8"	17 July 2026
Khanit is worried Toto is working himself into the ground at his expense. Veha finally relents and gives Akki a chance. Khanit realises the best thing for Toto might be to let him go. Akki gets offered a job following his true passion. Toto fights for his right to love Khanit.
9	"Episode 9"	24 July 2026
Khanit takes the chance to dote on Toto for a change. Toto's mother comes for an unwelcome visit. Akki gets a letter that could change his life but Veha refuses to let him slip away again. A plane makes and emergency landing and slides off of the runway.
10	"Episode 10"	31 July 2026
Je Zo decides to loan Toto everything he needs to start his business. Khanit is accepted into an airline overseas. Akki tries to break up with Veha again, much to Veha's dismay. Toto returns to Khanit's family to pitch a life-changing opportunity.

== Original soundtrack ==
The official soundtrack for A Dog and a Plane features:

Song	Artist(s)	Label	Ref.
"กู้ภัยกู้ใจ (Rescue You)"	Tay Tawan	GMMTV Records	
"Fly With Me, Free My Heart"	New Thitipoom	GMMTV Records	
"รักไม่มีเหตุผล (No Reason)"	Tay Tawan and New Thitipoom	GMMTV Records	
"โดยสวัสดิภาพ (Good Flight)"	Tui Chayatorn	GMMTV Records	

== Production ==
On 19 August 2025, it was announced that the role of Chatchai would be recast from Natarit Worakornlertsith (Marc) to Tanutchai Wijitvongtong (Mond) and the role of Veha (previously named Ozone) would be recast from Poon Mitpakdee to Phudtripart Bhudthonamochai (Ryu) after the acting partnership between the previous actors was terminated, with Poon transferring to the series My Romance Scammer. Production for the series officially began on 30 November 2025. The official series trailer was released on 14 May 2026.
