= Phudtripart Bhudthonamochai =

Thai actor (born 2000)

- พุติพัฒน์ พุทโธนะโมชัย
- Born: 15 August 2000 (age 26); Thailand
- Other name: Ryu (ริว)
- Education: St. Stephen's International School; Chulalongkorn University (Architecture)
- Occupation: Actor
- Years active: 2022–present
- Agent: GMMTV
- Height: 1.85 m (6 ft 1 in)

Phudtripart Bhudthonamochai (Thai: พุติพัฒน์ พุทโธนะโมชัย; born 15 August 2000), nicknamed Ryu (Thai: ริว), is a Thai actor under GMMTV. He is known for his roles in Summer Night (2024), Ossan's Love Thailand and playThat Summer (2025), and A Dog and a Plane (2026).

== Career ==
In 2022, Ryu was announced as the lead of the BL series Jump กระโดดคว้ารัก, alongside Patchara Silapasoonthorn (Surf) and Dechchart Tasilp (Sea). The pilot was released on 1 October 2022 on the Sol Entertainment Thailand YouTube channel.

In 2024, Ryu made his debut with GMMTV through a guest appearance in episode 9 of My Love Mix-Up! as a member of the astronomy club.

Later in 2024, he played Jewel in Summer Night, where he was paired with actor Bhobdhama Hansa (Java).

In November 2024, during the GMMTV 2025 "Riding the Wave" event, it was announced that the "RyuJava" pairing would be dissolved. Ryu was then paired with Tanutchai Wijitvongtong (Mond), forming the "MondRyu" duo, while Java was paired with Surf.

In 2025, Mond and Ryu appeared as a couple in the series That Summer, where Ryu played Wut, a doctor. The same year, he appeared in Ossan's Love Thailand as Newyear.

In August 2025, following the end of the "MarcPoon" (Natarit Worakornlertsith and Poon Mitpakdee) pair, Mond and Ryu were announced as the new lead couple for the BL series A Dog and a Plane.

In November 2025, at the GMMTV 2026 "Magic Vibes Maximized" event, Mond and Ryu were announced as one of the couples in the BL series The Spooky Love Tale. Ryu was also confirmed as part of the cast of You Maniac and Ditto.

== Filmography ==
=== Television series ===
Key
†	Denotes television productions that have not yet been released

Year	Title	Role	Notes	Network	Ref.
2022	Jump	Mark	Main role	YouTube	
2024	My Love Mix-Up!	Astronomy club member	Guest role (Ep. 9)	GMM 25	
2024	Summer Night	Jewel	Supporting role	GMM 25	
2025	Ossan's Love Thailand	"Newyear" Narut Jiravarapong	Supporting role	GMM 25	
2025	That Summer	Wut	Supporting role	One 31	
2026	A Dog and a Plane	"Veha" Tanveha Wongsuksawat	Supporting role	One 31	
2026	You Maniac	Hun	Supporting role	GMM 25	
TBA	Ditto †	TBA	Supporting role	TBA	
TBA	Round One †	TBA	Supporting role	TBA	
TBA	Cinematch †	TBA	Supporting role	TBA	

== Events ==
=== Fan meetings ===
Year	Date	Title	Venue	Notes	Ref.
2025	22 March	Ossan’s Love Final EP. FAN MEETING	Union Hall, Union Mall, Bangkok, Thailand	Cast appearance	
2025	21 November	That Summer Final EP. Fan Meeting	Siam Pavalai Royal Grand Theatre, Siam Paragon, Bangkok, Thailand	Cast appearance	

=== Concerts and performances ===
Year	Date	Event	Venue	Performance	Ref.
2025	27 September	JOSS GAWIN INVINCIBLE FANCON	MCC Hall, The Mall Lifestore Bangkapi, Bangkok, Thailand	Performed "Next Love" with Mond Tanutchai and Neo Trai, and "Lover" alongside Joss Way-ar, Gawin Caskey, Barcode Tinnasit, Poon Mitpakdee, Satang Kittiphop and Ford Allan	
2025	20 December	GMMTV STARLYMPICS 2025	Impact Arena, Muang Thong Thani, Nonthaburi, Thailand	Performed "Hook (เพลงรัก)" alongside the Pod and Papang pairing as part of the Mond and Ryu duo	
2026	29 May	A Dog and A Plane Love at First Flight	ICONSIAM Hall, Bangkok, Thailand	Premiere event and special stage performance	

=== Online shows ===
Year	Date	Title	Platform	Notes	Ref.
2025	7 October	GMMTV LIVE HOUSE ON STAGE with MOND RYU and SING JAN	YouTube	Guest appearance during GMMTV FANIVAL	
