= Patchara Silapasoonthorn =

Thai actor (born 2002)

- พชร ศิลปสุนทร
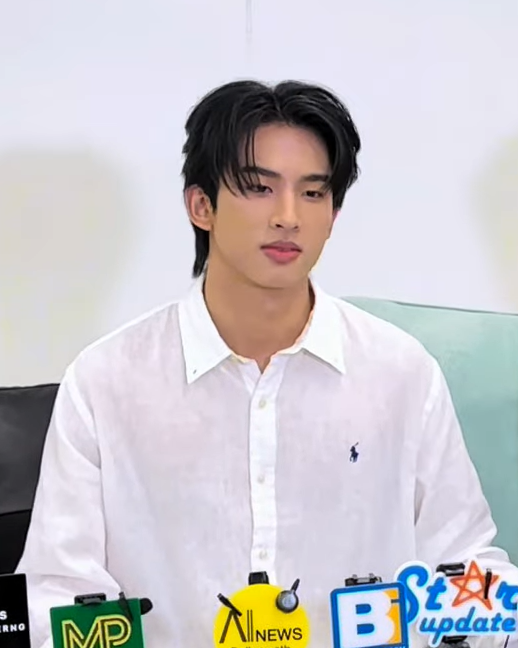
- Patchara in 2026
- Born: 26 October 2002 (age 24); Chonburi, Thailand
- Other name: Surf (เซิร์ฟ)
- Education: Mahidol University International College
- Occupation: Actor
- Years active: 2024–present
- Agent: Sol Entertainment (2022-2024) GMMTV (2024-present)
- Known for: Farm in Head 2 Head; Tum in MuTeLuv
- Height: 184 cm (6 ft 1/2 in)
- Website: GMMTV Artists

Patchara Silapasoonthorn (Thai: พชร ศิลปสุนทร; born 26 October 2002), nicknamed Surf (Thai: เซิร์ฟ), is a Thai actor. He is known for his roles in Head 2 Head (2025) and MuTeLuv: Love Me If You Swear (2026).

== Early life and education ==
Patchara was born on 26 October, 2002. He was born in Pattaya, Chonburi and attended Assumption College Sriracha for middle school and a demonstration school for high school. He graduated from Mahidol University International College in September 2026 with a degree in Business Administration. After signing with GMMTV in 2024, he was able to undertake an internship in Digital Marketing and Creativity within the company.

== Career ==
In 2022, he filmed the pilot for the cancelled series Jump, alongside fellow GMMTV Artists Dechchart Tasilp (Sea) and Phudtripart Bhudthonamochai (Ryu).

In May 2024, Surf was introduced as an artist under Dee Hup House. Later, he had his debut as Yo in the series I Saw You in My Dream

Shortly before the start of 2025, Surf joined the artist agency GMMTV. In 2025, he played Farm in the GMMTV series Head 2 Head partnered with Bhobdhama Hansa (Java) as Van. Due to the termination of the acting partnership between Pawat Chittsawangdee (Ohm) and Thanaphon U-sinsap (Leng) on 15 March, 2025, it was announced a day later that the role of Tum in MuTeLuv: Love Me If You Swear would be recast from Pawat to Patchara, becoming his breakthrough role in the BL industry. As it was also announced role of Oh would be recast from Thanaphon to Bhobdhama, this soldified their status as an official acting pair within the BL Industry.

On 25 November, 2025, he was revealed to be cast to play Prat in the GMMTV series Roommate Chaos, continuing his partnership with Bhobdhama. He is also set to appear in GMMTV's Surf 'n' Love.

== Filmography ==
=== Television series ===
Key
†	Denotes television productions that have not yet been released

Year	Title	Role	Notes	Network
2024	I Saw You in My Dream	"Yo" Yospol Silpakarnsakul	Supporting role	WeTV
2025	Head 2 Head	Farm	Supporting role	GMM 25
2026	MuTeLuv: Love Me If You Swear	"Tum" Teetat Rungreungtat	Main role	GMM 25
TBA	Roommate Chaos †	Prat	Main role	TBA
TBA	Surf 'n' Love †	Alto	Supporting role	TBA
TBA	The Gentlemen's Blood †	Kirin	Main role	TBA
TBA	Itaewon Class: Thai Edition †	TBA	Supporting role	TBA

== Discography ==
=== Collaborations ===
==== Singles ====
Year	Title	Label	Ref.
2026	"เข้าแล้วห้ามออก (No Exit)" with Java Bhobdhama	GMMTV Records	

==== Soundtrack appearances ====
Year	Title	Soundtrack	Label	Ref.
2025	"เพื่อนข้างๆ (Friend Next Door)" with Java Bhobdhama	Head 2 Head OST	GMMTV Records	

== Fan meetings ==
Title	Date	Venue	Notes	Ref.
Head 2 Head: The First Round	October 18, 2025	9th Fl. Cinema 15, SF World Cinema, Centralworld	With Head 2 Head cast	
Head 2 Head Final EP. Fan Meeting	January 11, 2026	Siam Pavalai Royal Grand Theater, Siam Paragon	With Head 2 Head cast	
Naiin Book Fair 2026	January 25, 2026	Samyan Mitrtown, 5th Fl.	With Java	
GMMTV Fanival 2026	April 6, 2026	CentralWorld Pulse, 7th Fl.	With Java	
SurfJava Fan Meeting in Thailand	April 25, 2026	MCC Hall, The Mall Lifestore Bangkae	With Java	
Summer Fantasy on Surf: Surf Fan Sign in Shanghai	May 30, 2026	Shanghai, China	—N/a	
GMMTV International Novel Festival 2026	July 27, 2026	Samyan Mitrtown, 5th Fl.	With Java	
GMMTV International Novel Festival 2026	July 27, 2026	Samyan Mitrtown, 5th Fl.	With Roommate Chaos cast	
GMMTV Fanival: Happy Family	October 8, 2026	Union Hall, Union Mall	With Java	
GMMTV Fan Day 2027: Taipei	April 17–18, 2027	Zepp New Taipei, Honhui Plaza	With Java	
