= 2026 in Thai television =

Overview of the events of 2026 in Thai television

This is a list of Thai television-related events from 2026.

== Events ==
=== February ===
- 27 February – GMMTV premieres the BL drama series Only Friends: Dream On on One 31, accompanied by a live premiere event at centralwOrld.

=== September ===
- 10 September–4 October – Live television coverage of the 2026 Asian Games is broadcast across Thailand via NBT, T Sports 7, 9 MCOT HD, One 31, Thairath TV, PPTV HD 36, and streaming platform AIS Play.

== Programs ==
=== Debuts ===
Key
†	Denotes television productions that have not yet been released

Date	Show	Network	Genre	Ref.
13 January	Bestie Tasty (Season 3)	GMM 25	Variety	
20 January	Cat for Cash	GMM 25	Romantic comedy	
20 January	Peach Lover	MCOT HD	Romantic drama	
24 January	4 Elements	Channel 7 HD	Anthology series	
30 January	Be My Angel	iQIYI	Romantic comedy	
31 January	Duang with You	One 31	Romantic comedy	
1 February	My Romance Scammer	GMM 25	Romantic comedy	
27 February	Only Friends: Dream On	One 31	Romantic drama	
2 March	Love Like a Bike	Channel 3 HD	Romantic drama	
7 March	Girl from Nowhere: The Reset	Netflix	Anthology thriller	
9 March	Girl Rules	GMM 25	Romantic drama	
14 March	Love You Teacher	GMM 25	Romantic drama	
22 March	Trend to Golden Figure	GMM 25	Variety	
27 March	Love Upon a Time	Workpoint TV	Historical romance	
21 April	Magic Move	One 31	Romantic comedy	
24 April	Love of Silom	WeTV	Romantic drama	
25 April	Flower Boy	One 31	Romantic drama	
3 May	Enemies with Benefits	GMM 25	Romantic comedy	
5 May	Wu	GMM 25	Fantasy	
9 May	Your Dear Daddy	MCOT HD	Romantic drama	
13 May	When Oranges Fall	GMM 25	Coming-of-age	
19 May	ChermChey	True Visions Now	Romantic drama	
21 May	CLOUD DREAM Project	GMM 25	Reality	
29 May	A Dog and a Plane	One 31	Romantic comedy	
30 May	Payback	One 31	Romantic drama	
30 May	Ticket to Heaven	GMM 25	Romantic drama	
20 June	Lost to Light	GMM 25	Romantic comedy	
20 June	The Edge of Horizon	One 31	Historical romance	
25 June	When Light Fades	Viu	Romantic drama	
7 July	Mr. Kill	GMM 25	Thriller	
9 July	Peach and Me	GMM 25	Romantic drama	
14 July	Love Destiny	Channel 3 HD	Historical romance	
17 July	Make It Right	MCOT HD	Romantic drama	
24 July	Class Crush Crisis	One 31	Coming-of-age	
26 July	Don't Be Too Emotional	iQIYI	Romantic drama	
26 July	Match Point	GMM 25	Romantic drama	
26 July	Your Third	GMM 25	Romantic comedy	
6 August	Unlucky Bae	GMM 25	Romantic comedy	
12 August	Moonshadow	GMM 25	Romantic drama	
14 August	Weirdo-101	One 31	Romantic drama	
29 August	You Maniac	GMM 25	Romantic drama	
29 August	Mr. Fanboy	GMM 25	Romantic drama	
5 September	The Grim Lover	One 31	Romantic drama	
7 September	Khom Khlang	WeTv	Romantic drama	
18 September	Oops! Mysterious Sounds	Workpoint TV	Romantic drama	
18 September	The Crow Club	One 31	Romantic drama	
19 September	The D Dorm	One 31	Sitcom	
20 September	Max Vote Road Trip (Season 2)	GMM 25	Travel variety	
3 October	CLUB FUN DEE with Dentist Tu	GMM 25	Talk show	
4 October	Decoding You	Channel 3 HD	Romantic drama	
4 October	Idol Energy (Season 2)	GMM 25	Variety	
8 October	Fool In Love	iQIYI	Romantic drama	
11 October	Good Boy	GMM 25	Romantic drama	
14 October	Teach Me, Touch Me	iQIYI	Romantic drama	
30 October	Lovers & Gangsters	One 31	Romantic drama	
31 October	Khemjira Forever	One 31	Romantic drama	
4 November	Scarlet Heart Ullavee	One 31	Historical romance	
7 November	Oxytoxin	GMM 25	Romantic drama	
23 November	Gunshot †	GMM 25	Romantic drama	

=== Ending this year ===
Date	Show	Network	Debut	Status	Ref.
11 January	Head 2 Head	GMM 25	2025	Ended	
17 January	Me and Thee	GMM 25	2025	Ended	
30 January	Pepsi Mitrchuankin Guide with Gemini - Fourth (Season 2)	GMM 25	2025	Ended	
4 February	Burnout Syndrome	GMM 25	2025	Ended	
13 February	Melody of Secrets	One 31	2025	Ended	
26 February	Dare You to Death	GMM 25	2025	Ended	
2 March	MuTeLuv	GMM 25	2025	Ended	
10 March	Bestie Tasty (Season 3)	GMM 25	2026	Ended	
20 March	Be My Angel	iQIYI	2026	Ended	
24 March	Cat for Cash	GMM 25	2026	Ended	
24 March	Peach Lover	MCOT HD	2026	Ended	
18 April	Duang with You	One 31	2026	Ended	
19 April	My Romance Scammer	GMM 25	2026	Ended	
20 April	Love Like a Bike	Channel 3 HD	2026	Ended	
15 May	Only Friends: Dream On	One 31	2026	Ended	
16 May	Love You Teacher	GMM 25	2026	Ended	
1 June	Girl Rules	GMM 25	2026	Ended	
12 June	Love Upon a Time	Workpoint TV	2026	Ended	
13 June	Flower Boy	One 31	2026	Ended	
23 June	Magic Move	One 31	2026	Ended	
27 June	Your Dear Daddy	MCOT HD	2026	Ended	
30 June	Wu	GMM 25	2026	Ended	
4 July	Ticket to Heaven	GMM 25	2026	Ended	
5 July	Enemies with Benefits	GMM 25	2026	Ended	
9 July	CLOUD DREAM Project	GMM 25	2026	Ended	
10 July	Love of Silom	WeTV	2026	Ended	
14 July	ChermChey	TrueVisions Now	2026	Ended	
18 July	Lost to Light	GMM 25	2026	Ended	
29 July	When Oranges Fall	GMM 25	2026	Ended	
31 July	A Dog and a Plane	One 31	2026	Ended	
29 August	4 Elements	Channel 7 HD	2026	Ended	
1 August	Payback	One 31	2026	Ended	
1 August	Peach and Me	GMM 25	2026	Ended	
13 August	When Light Fades	Viu	2026	Ended	
29 August	The Edge of Horizon	One 31	2026	Ended	
7 September	Trend to Golden Figure	GMM 25	2026	Ended	
8 September	Mr. Kill	GMM 25	2026	Ended	
11 September	Class Crush Crisis	One 31	2026	Ended	
11 September	Don't Be Too Emotional	iQIYI	2026	Ended	
15 September	Love Destiny	Channel 3 HD	2026	Ended	
27 September	Match Point	GMM 25	2026	Ended	
2 October	Make It Right	MCOT HD	2026	Ended	
8 October	Unlucky Bae	GMM 25	2026	Ended	
11 October	Your Third	GMM 24	2026	Ended	
14 October	Moonshadow	GMM 25	2026	Ended	
16 October	Weirdo-101	One 31	2026	Ended	
31 October	You Maniac	GMM 25	2026	Ended	
3 November	Khom Khlang	WeTV	2026	Ended	
14 November	Mr. Fanboy	GMM 25	2026	Ended	
20 November	Oops! Mysterious Sounds	Workpoint TV	2026	Ended	
21 November	Khemjira Forever	One 31	2026	Ended	
22 November	Decoding You	Channel 3 HD	2026	Ended	
5 December	The D Dorm	One 31	2026	Ongoing	
13 December	Fool In Love	iQIYI	2026	Ongoing	
13 December	Good Boy	GMM 25	2026	Ongoing	
16 December	Teach Me, Touch Me	iQIYI	2026	Ongoing	

== Networks and services ==
=== Launches ===
- MONOMAX SPORTS TV – Launched/operated for live sports broadcasting, including the 2026 Asian Games.
