= Narongdet Rungarun =

Thai actor (born 2000)

- เดช ณรงค์เดช รุ่งอรุณ
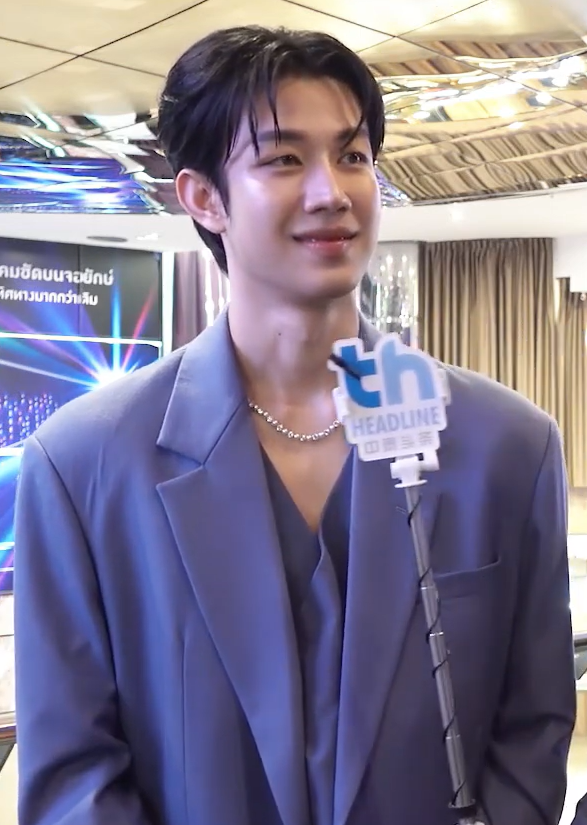
- Dech in 2025
- Born: 24 April 2000 (age 26); Thailand
- Other name: Dech
- Occupation: Actor
- Years active: 2022–present
- Agent: Dee Hup House
- Notable work: Playboyy; Knock Out; Influlover; Bling Bling

Narongdet Rungarun (Thai: เดช ณรงค์เดช รุ่งอรุณ; born 24 April 2000), professionally known as Dech, is a Thai actor. He made his television debut in Remember Me in 2022. He is best known for his roles in Playboyy (2023), Knock Out (2025), Influlover (2026), and Bling Bling (2026). In 2026, he was announced as part of the cast of I Flower You.

== Career ==
Narongdet made his acting debut in 2022 with the television series Remember Me.

In 2023, he landed his first leading role in the boys' love series Playboyy, portraying the twins Nont and Nant.

In 2025, he joined the cast of Knock Out, an action romance series centred on the world of Muay Thai, portraying Mawin opposite Kantapon Chompupan (Guide)'s character Itt. In 2025, he joined the cast of Knock Out, an action romance series centred on the world of Muay Thai.

In 2026, Narongdet starred in Influlover and Bling Bling, playing Focus and Thoprakai, respectively. The same year, he was announced as part of the cast of I Flower You.

== Filmography ==
=== Television ===
| Year | Title | Role | Billing | Network / Platform |
|---|---|---|---|---|
| 2022 | Remember Me | — | Supporting | Channel 3 |
| 2023 | Playboyy | Nont / Nant | Leading | GagaOOLala, iQIYI |
| 2025 | Knock Out | Mawin | Supporting | WeTV |
| 2026 | Influlover | Focus | Leading | YouTube |
| 2026 | Bling Bling | Thoprakai | Leading | TrueVisions NOW |
| 2026 | I Flower You | Phat | Supporting | One 31, iQIYI |
