= Don't Say No =

Don't Say No may refer to:

- Don't Say No (album), a 1981 album by Billy Squier, or the title track
- Don't Say No (Seohyun EP), a 2016 EP by Seohyun, or the title track
- "Don't Say No", a song by KC and the Sunshine Band from the 1981 album The Painter
- "Don't Say No", a song by Tom Tom Club song from the 1988 album Boom Boom Chi Boom Boom
- "Don't Say No", a song by Robbie Williams from the 2005 album Intensive Care
- Don't Say No (TV series), a 2021 Thai television series

== See also ==
- "Don't Say No Tonight", a 1985 single by Eugene Wilde
