= Chintub Duangkaew =

Thai actor and model

- เฟย์ ชินทัพพ์ ดวงแก้ว
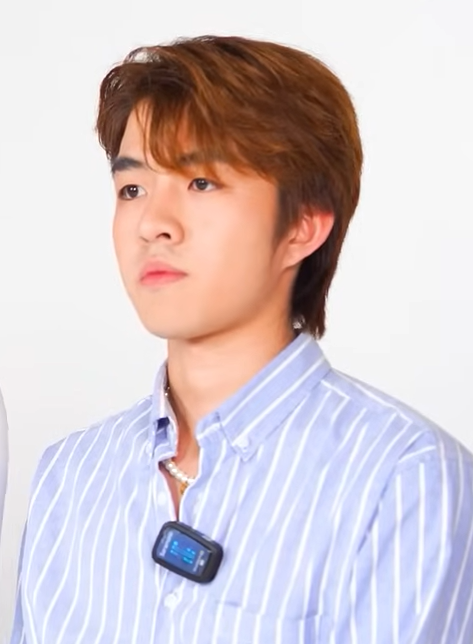
- Fay in 2023
- Born: Jutapat Duangkaew; 22 June 2003 (age 23); Thailand
- Other names: Fay (เฟย์), Chinthap Duangkaeo
- Occupations: Actor; Model
- Years active: 2017–present
- Agent: Ajintai Entertainment (2023) - CUU Thailand (2025 - Present)
- Notable work: Porsche inPlayboyy; Mai in Gelboys; Yam in Love Destiny

Chintub Duangkaew (Thai: ชินทัพพ์ ดวงแก้ว; born 22 June 2003), professionally known as Fay (Thai: เฟย์), is a Thai actor and model. He is also known as Jutapat Duangkaew and Chinthap Duangkaeo. He is known for his roles in 2 Moons: The Series (2017), Playboyy (2023), Gelboys (2025), ChermChey (2026), and Love Destiny (2026).

== Career ==
Duangkaew began his acting career in 2017, when he appeared in the television series 2 Moons: The Series, portraying the younger version of Kit.

In 2023, he portrayed Porsche, his first leading role, in the boys' love series Playboyy, which was distributed by iQIYI.

In 2025, he joined the cast of the first season of Gelboys, portraying Mai, a member of the 100% Battery group.

In 2026, he portrayed A-Ten in the series ChermChey. In the same year, he joined the main cast of the remake of Love Destiny, produced by Channel 3, portraying Yam and appearing opposite Thunyatorn Viwatdecha (Thun).

In June 2023, Duangkaew was introduced as a member of the third generation of a boy group being developed by Ajintai Entertainment.

== Filmography ==
=== Television series ===
Year	Title	Role	Role type	Network
2017	2 Moons: The Series	Kit (young)	Guest role	One 31
2023	Playboyy	Porsche Patchanon Ponglert	Main cast	iQIYI
2025	Gelboys	Mai	Supporting cast	One 31
2026	ChermChey	A-Ten	Supporting cast	GagaOOlala
2026	Love Destiny	Yam	Main cast role	Channel 3

=== Television programs ===
Year	Title	Role	Notes	Network
2020	SosatSeoulsay	Guest	Episodes 212, 219 and 234	YouTube
