= Ratchanon Kanpiang =

Thai actor and singer

- นนท์ รัชชานนท์ กันเพรียง
- Non in 2026
- Born: 17 February 2001 (age 25)
- Other name: Non (นนท์)
- Occupations: Actor; singer
- Years active: 2020–present
- Agent: AB Group Entertainment

Ratchanon Kanpiang (Thai: นนท์ รัชชานนท์ กันเพรียง; born 17 February 2001), known professionally as Non, is a Thai actor and singer. His television credits include Friend Forever, Love Syndrome III, The Rebound, Sangmin Dinneaw and Teach Me, Touch Me.

== Career ==
Non began his acting career in 2020 with a supporting role in the Thai television series Friend Forever.

In 2023, he appeared in the series Love Syndrome III. In September 2023, Non was announced to play Cake in the Thai series Live in Love. However, before the series premiered, the cast was changed, and the character was ultimately played by Junior Chokkorn Deotrakul.

In 2024, he was paired with actor Chaloemdet Thammawut (Joke), forming the on-screen pairing known as NonJoke. That year, he also played Tor in Sangmin Dinneaw and appeared in The Rebound.

In 2025, Non released the single "เป็นแฟนกันหน่อยดิ" as part of the musical duo NON X JOKE, alongside actor and singer Joke Chaloemdet Thammawut. The song was accompanied by an official music video published on AB Group Entertainment's YouTube channel.

In 2026, Non joined the cast of the series Teach Me, Touch Me, playing Nu.

== Filmography ==
=== Television ===
Year	Title	Role	Notes	Network/platform	Ref.
2020	Friend Forever	Not	Supporting role	MCOT HD	
2021	F4 Thailand: Boys Over Flowers	Student	Guest appearance	GMM 25, Viu	
2022	GAP	Nop	Supporting role	Channel 3	
2022	The Eclipse	Young (Thua's stepfather)	Guest appearance (episode 8)	GMM 25, Viu	
2022	Love Stage!!	Bank	Supporting role; Anda's friend	Amarin TV, AIS Play	
2023	Love Syndrome III	Mac	Supporting role; Itt's high school friend	Amarin TV, WeTV	
2024	The Rebound	Prince	Supporting role	Channel 3, Viu	
2024	Sangmin Dinneaw	Tor	Supporting role; the uncut version was released as Sangmin Dinneaw: Uncut	MCOT HD, iQIYI	
2026	Girl From Nowhere: The Reset	BB	Guest appearance (episode 5)	Netflix	
2026	Teach Me, Touch Me	Nu	Main role	iQIYI	

=== Films ===
Year	Title	Role	Notes	Ref.
2021	Once in Memory: Just Found Love	Film	Lead role; part of the Once in Memory anthology	
2021	Once in Memory: Love at First Sight	Film	Lead role; part of the Once in Memory anthology	
2023	Moments of Love	Non	Lead role in the "My Ex-Boyfriend" segment	

== Music videos ==
Year	Title	Artist(s)	Notes	Ref.
2025	"เป็นแฟนกันหน่อยดิ" (Would You Please Be My Boyfriend?)	NON X JOKE	Official music video; released on 11 March 2025	
