= Siraphop Manithikhun =

Thai actor (born 1997)

- สิรภพ มานิธิคุณ
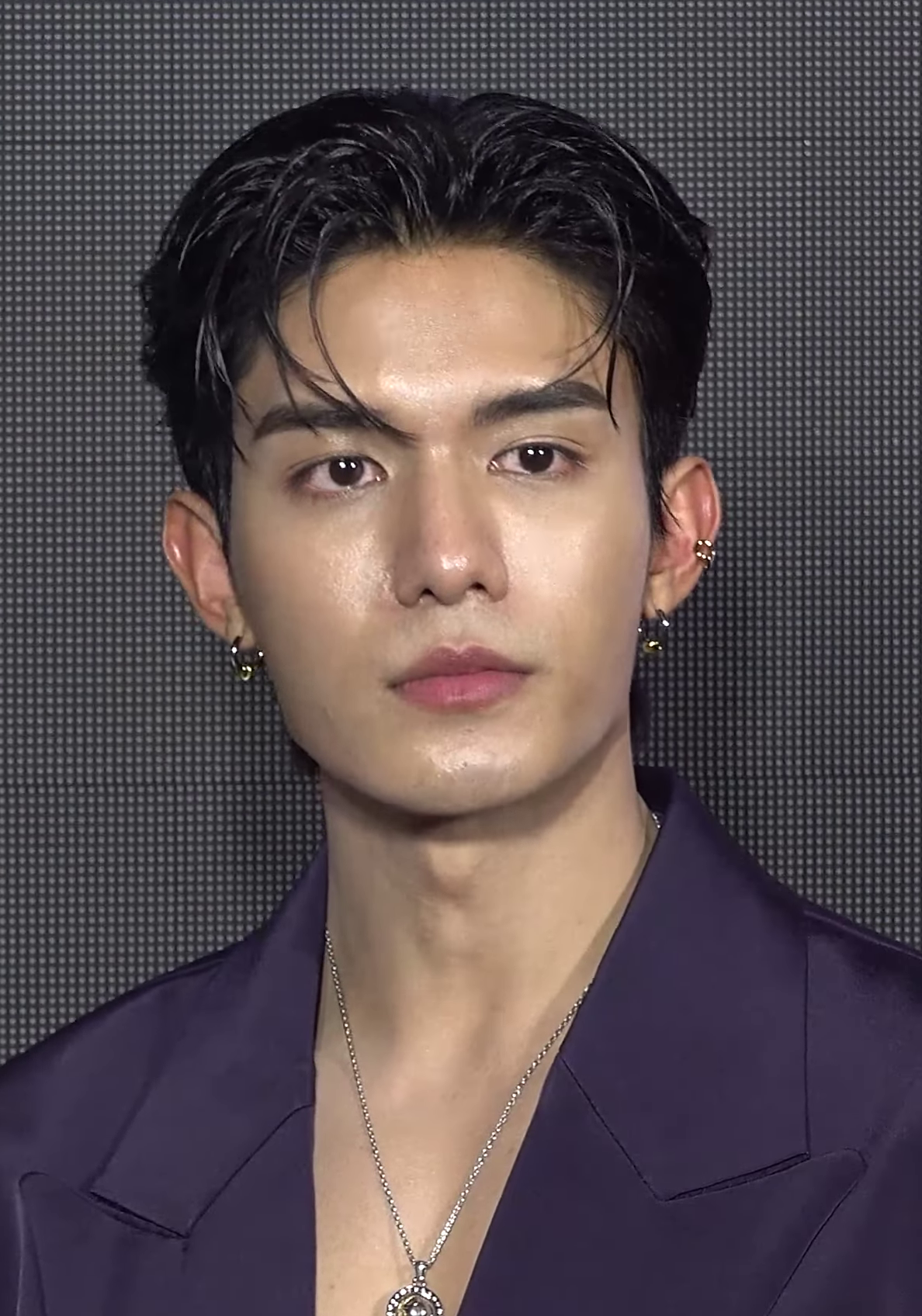
- Manithikhun in 2024
- Born: 8 July 1997 (age 29)
- Other name: Net (เน็ต)
- Occupation: Actor
- Years active: 2013–present
- Agent: Domundi

Siraphop Manithikhun (Thai: สิรภพ มานิธิคุณ, born 8 July 1997), nicknamed Net (Thai: เน็ต), is a Thai actor under Domundi TV.

He is best known for his role as Phop in Love Upon a Time (2026).

== Early life and education ==
Siraphop Manithikhun attended Assumption College in Bangkok and got a bachelor's degree in International trade from Coventry University, London. He has been learning guitar and playing music since his childhood. Middle child, he has two brothers and his family runs the food business My Foodnet.

== Career ==
Manithikhun had been wanting to become an actor since he was a kid. In high school, he starred in the horror movie series Make Me Shudder, but then left the entertainment industry to focus on his studies. After his bachelor's degree, he came back to Thailand and took part in the movie Tell the World I Love You. He was subsequently signed by Domundi.

In 2022, he starred in the TV series Catch Me Baby, then played his first main role as King in Bed Friend.

In 2025, he was listed among Thailand 50 rising icons by Lifestyle Asia.

== Filmography ==
=== Film ===
Year	Title	Role	Notes	Ref.
2013	Make Me Shudder	Net	Supporting role	
2014	Make Me Shudder 2	Net	Supporting role	
2014	Dangerous Boys	Paeng	Supporting role	
2015	Make Me Shudder 3	Net	Main role	
2022	Tell the World I Love You	Tai	Supporting role	
2024	Dangerous Boys 2	Paeng	Main role	

=== Television series ===
Year	Title	Role	Network	Notes	Ref.
2021	Y-Destiny	Top	AIS Play	Guest role (Ep. 11–12)	
2022	Cutie Pie		Workpoint TV	Guest role (Ep. 12)	
2022	War of Y		AIS Play	Guest role	
2022	Catch Me Baby	Captain	WeTV	Supporting role	
2023	Suphapburut Sut Soi 2023	King	One 31	Guest role	
2023	Bed Friend	King	One 31, IQIYI	Main role	
2023	The Middleman's Love	King	One 31, IQIYI	Supporting role	
2025	The Next Prince	Calvin	One 31, IQIYI	Supporting role	
2025	Khemjira	Kachen Erdoğan	One 31, IQIYI	Supporting role	
2025	Zomvivor	Earth	Netflix	Supporting role	
2025	Rock and Soul	Nike	Channel 7	Supporting role	
2026	Love Upon a Time	Phop/Tinnaphop	Workpoint TV, iQIYI	Main role	
2026	The D Dorm	Dawin	One 31	Main role	
2026	Khemjira Forever	Kachen Erdoğan	One 31, iQIYI	Supporting role	
TBA	Restart				
TBA	30 Days of Us	Bear		Main role	

=== Web series ===
Year	Title	Role	Notes	Ref.
2023	Y Journey: Stay Like a Local	Mai	Main role	
2025	Black Valentine	Bomb	Main role	

=== Music video appearances ===
Year	Title	Artist(s)	Ref.
2022	"ย้อน (Back)"	ZMaj	

== Discography ==
Title	Year	Album
Soundtrack appearances
"Feel Fan" (ไม่ชอบเป็นเพื่อนเธอ) (with James Su)	2023	Bed Friend OST
"Only One Word" (คำพูดคำเดียว)	2024	The Middleman's Love OST
"Within" (คำคะนึง)	2026	Love Upon a Time OST
"The Love I Found" (รักที่เป็นเธอ) (with JJ Radchapon)	2026	Love Upon a Time OST

== Awards and nominations ==
Name of the award ceremony, year presented, category, nominee of the award, and the result of the nomination
Award	Year	Category	Nominee/work	Result	Ref.
Howe Awards	2022	Howe New Generation Award	Siraphop Manithikhun	Won	
Kazz Awards	2023	Favorite Award	with Supamongkon Wongwisut	Won	
Kazz Awards	2024	The Best Actor of the Year	Siraphop Manithikhun	Won	
Kazz Awards	2024	Most Popular Youth Award	Siraphop Manithikhun	3rd place	
Kazz Awards	2024	Couple of the Year	with Supamongkon Wongwisut	Nominated	
Nakarat Awards	2026	Boy's Love Rising Star of the Year	with Radchapon Phornpinit	Won	
Pattaya International Film Festival	2026	Outstanding Rising BL Actor	with Radchapon Phornpinit	Won	
Sanook Top of the Year Awards	2023	Best Couple of the Year	with Supamongkon Wongwisut	Nominated	
Shimo 3rd Anniversary Party	2023	Overseas Popular Actor of the Year	Siraphop Manithikhun	Won	
Silk Road Cohesion Ceremony	2024	Silk Road China-Thailand Potential Actor Award	Siraphop Manithikhun	Won	
The Viral Hits Thailand Spotlight Awards	2026	Best Trending On-Screen Couple Award	with Radchapon Phornpinit	Won	
Zoomdara Awards	2025	Hottest Male Rising Star of the Year	Siraphop Manithikhun	Nominated	
