= Knock Out (TV series) =

- Official poster
- หมัดน็อกล็อกหัวใจ
- Genre: Boys' love, Drama, Romance, Sports
- Created by: Dawin
- Written by: Siraya Lertsmithwong, Pawich Amnajkasem
- Directed by: Tee Sintanaparadee
- Country of origin: Thailand
- Original language: Thai
- No. of seasons: 1
- No. of episodes: 12

Production
- Executive producers: Earnie Jantawong, Boss Anuson Limprasert
- Editor: Benz Baragrom Sawangthaitawat
- Running time: 64 minutes

Original release
- Network: WeTV
- Release: May 16 – July 18, 2025

Knock Out (Thai: หมัดน็อกล็อกหัวใจ) is a 2025 Thai television series released as an original production on WeTV. Directed by Tee Sintanaparadee, the main cast features Boripat Jamsat (Nice) and Natsakan Chairote (Gun).

== Synopsis ==
After the sudden death of his father, Keen is left to deal with debts and takes refuge in a Muay Thai camp. There he meets Than, a renowned fighter who refuses to compete despite his reputation. As they train and spend time together, Keen gradually breaks through Than's emotional barriers. Their relationship develops into a passionate romance, marked by personal challenges and the need to confront past secrets that threaten their future.

== Cast and characters ==
=== Main ===
- Boripat Jamsat (Nice) as Keen
- Natsakan Chairote (Gun) as Than
- Kantapon Chompupan (Guide) as Itt
- Narongdet Rungarun (Dech) as Mawin
- Thanakrit Talasopon (Earth) as Typhoon
- Jakarin Puribhat (Gap) as Yut

=== Supporting ===
- Ploiyukhon Rojanakatanyoo (Jo) as Klao
- Wiset as Mai
- Samart Payakaroon as Phet
- Napassakorn Midaim as Phuwis
- Malys Choeysobhon as Pakorn

=== Guest ===
- Orn-arnin Peerachakajornpatt (Artz) as Muay (Ep. 1–2, 4, 9)
- Savitree Samipak as Thida (Than's mother) (Ep. 2, 10–12)
- Chananticha Chaipa (Taengkwa) as Keaw (Itt's younger sister) (Ep. 3–5, 8, 10, 12)
- Phongpat Pongprapai (O) as Dang (Ep. 5, 8–12)
- Sakda Jutathep as Thep's subordinate (Ep. 8)
- Ratchapong Anomakiti (Poppy) as Poppy (Ep. 11)

== Production ==
The series was created by Dawin and directed by Tee Sintanaparadee. The script was written by Siraya Lertsmithwong and Pawich Amnajkasem. Production was overseen by Earnie Jantawong and Boss Anuson Limprasert.

== Broadcast ==
Knock Out premiered on May 16, 2025, and concluded on July 18, 2025, with 12 episodes of approximately 64 minutes each. Episodes were released weekly on Fridays as part of WeTV's original programming.

== Reception ==
Knock Out received wide coverage in Thai media. Sanook highlighted the blend of romance and sports as a distinctive element, TrueID emphasized the intensity of the protagonists’ relationship, and Naewna reported on the positive audience reception and the series’ prominence in WeTV's catalog.

== Awards and nominations ==
Award nominations for Knock Out
Year	Award	Category	Nominee(s)	Result	Ref.
2026	Thailand Y Content Awards 2025	Best Promotion of Thai Culture	Knock Out	Nominated	
