= I Feel You Linger in the Air =

2023 Thai television series

- Official series poster
- Also known as: Scent of Love; The Fragrance of Love; Hom Klin Khwam Rak
- Original title: หอมกลิ่นความรัก
- Genre: Historical drama; Fantasy romance; Boy's love
- Based on: I Feel You Linger in the Air (หอมกลิ่นความรัก) by Violet Rain
- Screenplay by: Somchai Tidsanawoot; Jungjing Wanna Kortunyavat; Tan Ekarin Mungmee
- Directed by: Tee Bundit Sintanaparadee
- Starring: Chanon Santinatornkul; Rapheephong Thapsuwan
- Composer: Ohm Cocktail
- Country of origin: Thailand
- Original language: Thai
- No. of episodes: 12

Production
- Producer: Wan Thabkrajang
- Cinematography: Jim Picharn Wimolchaiyaporn
- Running time: 46 minutes
- Production companies: YYDS Entertainment; Dee Hup House

Original release
- Network: One 31
- Release: August 18 – November 3, 2023

I Feel You Linger in the Air (Thai: หอมกลิ่นความรัก; RTGS: Hom Klin Khwam Rak; lit. 'Scent of Love') is a 2023 Thai boys' love-historical romance television series based on the 1994 novel by Violet Rain. The series is notable for being one of the first to combine period drama within the Thai BL genre. It stars Chanon Santinatornkul (Nonkul) and Rapheephong Thapsuwan (Bright).

== Synopsis ==
Jom, a modern-day architect managing the restoration of a dilapidated estate, sees strange visions of a man he has never met. Jilted by his lover Ohm, an accident thrusts him into 1927 where he meets Yai, the enigmatic man from his dreams.

== Cast and characters ==
- Chanon Santinatornkul (Nonkul) as Jom
- Rapheephong Thapsuwan (Bright) as Yai
- Kanokchat Munyadon (Typhoon) as Ohm / Kham Saen
- Nannirin Varokornwatcharakool (June) as Khai Muk / Fongkaew
- Auttharinya Uengsilpsrikul (Alee) as Ueang Phueng / Somjeed
- Kantapon Chompupan (Guide) as Ming
- Arthur Gagnaux (Attila) as Robert
- Thitisan Goodburn (Kimmy) as James

== Episodes ==
Episode	Episode title	Original air date	Summary
1	"The Past That Not Returns"	August 18, 2023	Following an abrupt and startling separation, Jom drives drunk and ends up in the river. He awakens to find himself in a strange area of Chiang Mai. He doesn't start to realize he's traveled through time until he catches a glimpse of a newspaper.
2	"Realm Of Memory"	August 25, 2023	Jom begins to adjust to his new surroundings, but he wasn't prepared to see so many people he knew.
3	"Thoughts of You That Distract"	September 1, 2023	Jom finds himself in a difficult predicament after unintentionally spotting Ohm beside the river.
4	"A Fresh Relationship Start"	September 8, 2023	After moving into Yai's home and beginning work for him, Jom meets Yai's father.
5	"Too Much for the Heart to Resist"	September 15, 2023	Jom deviates from the norm in the hopes of gaining Yai's support since he finds the conventions of the servant-master relationship intolerable.
6	"The Turning Point of the Heart"	September 22, 2023	Following the Christmas celebration, Yai makes the decision to express his true feelings for Jom.
7	"My Special Person"	September 29, 2023	Rumors of Yai and Jom's connection begin to circulate as they become closer.
8	"Forbidden Relationship"	October 6, 2023	Jom begins to sense that someone is watching them, and Yai's father begins to pay great attention to everything that the two of them do.
9	"Major Test of the Heart"	October 13, 2023	Yai and Jom's love is in danger of ending due to a marriage that the patriarch of the household arranges.
10	"Exposure for Change"	October 20, 2023	Just before the wedding, Jom unexpectedly appears and reveals a startling conspiracy.
11	"Countdown To Leave"	October 27, 2023	While Jom invites everyone to a party, Yai begins to assist Jom in finding a means to aid him.
12	"Never Return"	November 3, 2023	Jom bids Yai farewell as the lovers notice that Jom's body is slowly disappearing.

== Release ==
I Feel You Linger in the Air was released on One 31 on August 18, 2023. The series also streamed simultaneously on Youkou and GagaOoLala.

== Original soundtrack ==
- "Never Come Back" Image Suthita
- "Blissful Dream" Bright Rapheephong

== Accolades ==
=== Listicles ===
Year-end lists for Gelboys
Critic/Publication	List	Rank	Ref.
Teen Vogue	27 Best BL Dramas of All Time	Included	
