= Kantapon Chompupan =

Thai actor

- กันตพนธ์ ชมภูพาน
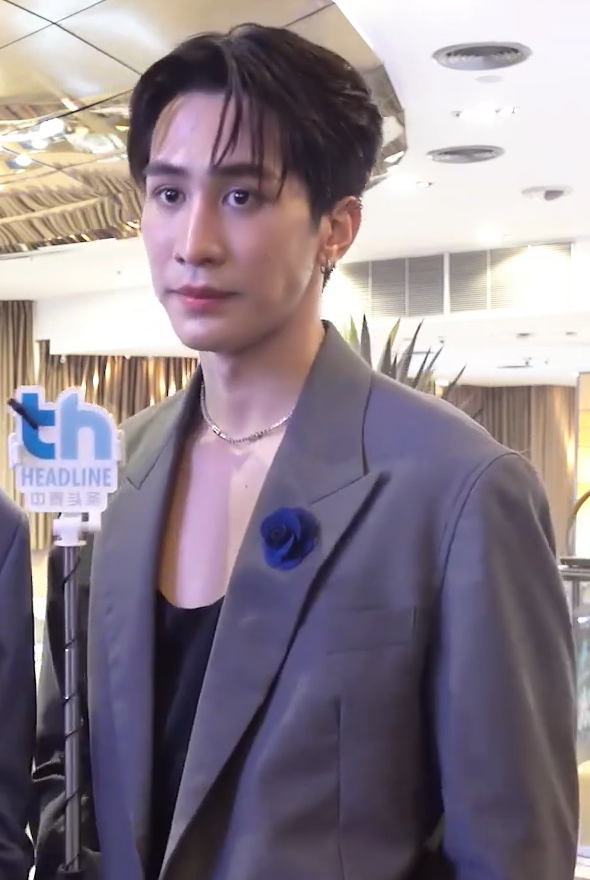
- Guide in 2025
- Born: Kantapon Chompupan; 21 February 2000 (age 26); Thailand
- Education: Faculty of Communication, Dhurakij Pundit University
- Occupation: Actor
- Years active: 2022–present
- Agent: DeeHup House (Generation D)
- Known for: Peach in Bake Me Please; Itt in Knock Out; Chatban in The Mask of Love; Ming in I Feel You Linger in the Air

Kantapon Chompupan (Thai: กันตพนธ์ ชมภูพาน; born 21 February 2000) is a Thai actor. He became best known for starring in the BL series Bake Me Please (2023) as Peach, and Knock Out (2025) as Itt. He also starred in the lakorn The Mask of Love and is recognized for his role as Ming in I Feel You Linger in the Air (2023). In 2026, he starred Influlover and Bling Bling.

== Biography ==
Kantapon is affiliated with Channel 8 and represented by DeeHup House (Generation D). He studied communication at Dhurakij Pundit University.

He began his career in television productions such as Mongkut Karma (2022), Muay Sading Mat Sing Saifah (2023), Saen Kaen Saen Sanaeha (2023), and Tanaosri (2023). In 2023, he starred in the BL Bake Me Please, in 2025 in Knock Out and the lakorn The Mask of Love.

In 2026, he was confirmed as the lead in Bling Bling, produced by Copy A Bangkok, alongside Narongdet Rungarun (Dech). That same year, he also starred in the vertical BL Influlover, produced by DeeHup House.

== Filmography ==
=== Television ===
Year	Title	Role	Type	Network / Platform
2022	Mongkut Karma	Montri	Supporting role	Channel 8
2023	Bake Me Please	Peach	Main role	Channel 8, TrueID, Viki
2023	I Feel You Linger in the Air	Ming	Supporting role	One 31 , GagaOOLala
2023	Muay Sading Mat Sing Saifah	Pele	Supporting role	Channel 8
2023	Saen Kaen Saen Sanaeha	Niphon	Supporting role	Channel 8
2023	Tanaosri	Kla	Supporting role	Thai PBS
2025	Knock Out	Itt	Supporting role	WeTV
2025	The Mask of Love	Chatban	Main role	Channel 78
2026	Bling Bling	Nine	Main role	TrueVisions NOW
2026	Influlover	Jed	Main role	Dee Hup House
2026	I Flower You	Wit	Supporting role	One 31, iQIYI
