= Bling Bling (TV series) =

2026 Thai television series

- Thai: เพชรประกาย
- Genre: Boys' love; Romantic comedy-drama
- Directed by: Cheewin Thanamin Wongskulphat
- Starring: Bank Sornram Aneklap; Mobile Pimrapat Phadungwatanachok; Kantapon Chompupan (Guide); Narongdet Rungarun (Dech); Markpoom Phatsanan Thanachotsakulwong; Cheriie Pichsinee Saejung
- Country of origin: Thailand
- Original language: Thai
- No. of episodes: 12

Production
- Editor: Theerasan Petmai
- Running time: 49 minutes

Original release
- Network: TrueVisions NOW
- Release: 13 March – 29 May 2026

Bling Bling (เพชรประกาย) is a 2026 Thai boys' love romantic comedy-drama television series directed by Cheewin Thanamin Wongskulphat and produced by COPY A BANGKOK. The series stars Bank Sornram Aneklap (Bank) and Pimrapat Phadungwatanachok (Mobile), alongside Kantapon Chompupan (Guide), Narongdet Rungarun (Dech), Markpoom Phatsanan Thanachotsakulwong, and Cheriie Pichsinee Saejung.

The series premiered on TrueVisions NOW on 13 March 2026 and aired weekly on Fridays, concluding on 29 May 2026 after 12 episodes.

== Synopsis ==
Following the sudden death of the founder of a traditional likay troupe, Petch-thae unexpectedly becomes the group's leader. As he struggles with financial difficulties, declining public interest in traditional Thai folk theatre, and tensions within his family, he is determined to preserve the troupe founded by his father.

By his side is Ployying, his longtime friend and the troupe's leading actress, who helps him navigate the challenges ahead. Meanwhile, Petch-thae's younger brother pursues a different path in the entertainment industry, while other members of the troupe embrace social media and digital platforms in an effort to introduce likay to a new generation.

== Cast ==
- Bank Sornram Aneklap as Petch-thae
- Mobile Pimrapat Phadungwatanachok as Ployying
- Kantapon Chompupan (Guide) as Nine
- Narongdet Rungarun (Dech) as Thoprakai
- Markpoom Phatsanan Thanachotsakulwong as Phlengchai
- Cheriie Pichsinee Saejung as Linji

== Production ==
Bling Bling was produced by COPY A BANGKOK and directed by Cheewin Thanamin Wongskulphat. The series was announced as part of the studio's 2026 line-up during a blessing ceremony held in February 2026 alongside several other productions.

The project was developed to present likay, a traditional form of Thai folk theatre, from a contemporary perspective by exploring themes such as social media, generational change, and the digital era. The official trailer was released on 3 March 2026 through COPY A BANGKOK's YouTube channel.

== Reception ==
Prior to its premiere, Bling Bling attracted attention from the Thai media for incorporating likay into a contemporary television narrative. The Standard highlighted the series' efforts to introduce the traditional performing art to modern audiences through a story set in the digital age.

Following its release, entertainment media described the series as a blend of romance, drama, and traditional Thai culture, while praising its cast and its portrayal of likay for younger audiences.
