= Nutthawut Eamchuen =

Thai actor (born 2004)

- โบนัส ณัฐวัฒน์ เอี่ยมชื่น
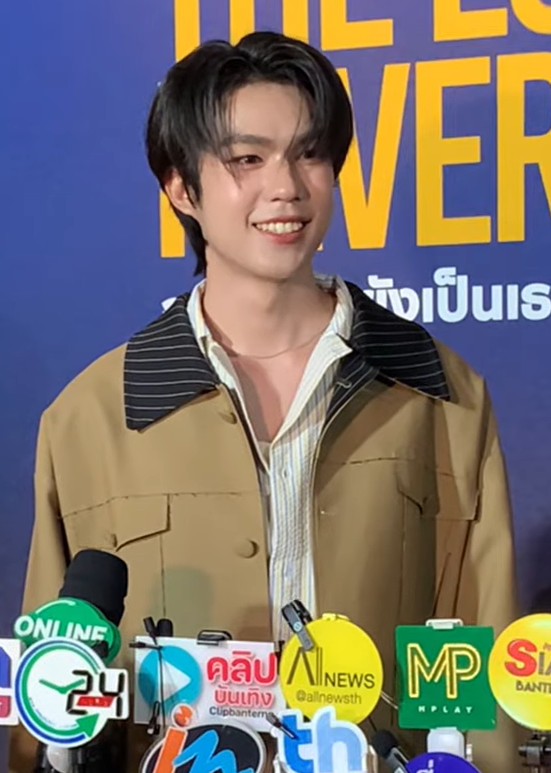
- Born: 16 November 2004 (age 21); Thailand
- Other name: Bonus
- Education: Chulalongkorn University
- Occupation: Actor
- Years active: 2022–present
- Agent: iQIYI
- Notable work: 6th Sense Agency; Gelboys; The Love Never Sets

Nutthawut Eamchuen (Thai: โบนัส ณัฐวัฒน์ เอี่ยมชื่น; born 16 November 2004), professionally known as Bonus, is a Thai actor. He began his acting career in 2022 and became known for his roles in the television series 6th Sense Agency (2024), Gelboys (2025), and The Love Never Sets (2025). In 2026, he was announced as the lead actor of the iQIYI series My Secret Boyfriends.

== Career ==
Bonus began his acting career in 2022. In 2023, he appeared in music videos by Thai artists and participated in television productions while studying at Chulalongkorn University.

In 2024, he made his debut as a leading actor in the Workpoint television series 6th Sense Agency, portraying Tom. The following year, he appeared in Gelboys as Moo and joined the cast of The Love Never Sets, in which he portrayed Warm.

In 2026, he joined the talent agency iQIYI Artist and was announced as the lead actor of My Secret Boyfriends. Earlier that year, he also appeared in the television series Duang with You.

== Filmography ==
=== Television ===
Year	Title	Role	Billing	Network / Platform
2024	Blondie in an Ancient Time	—	Supporting role	Workpoint
2024	6th Sense Agency	Tom	Main role	Workpoint
2025	Gelboys	Moo	Supporting role	One 31, iQIYI
2026	Duang with You	Communication Arts student (ep. 1)	Guest role	One 31, iQIYI

=== Film ===
Year	Title	Role	Billing
2025	TaKhon: The Cursed Mask	Arj's son	Guest role

=== Web dramas ===
Year	Title	Role	Billing	Platform
2025	Charging Gel	Moo (ep. 3)	Guest role	YouTube
2025	The Love Never Sets	Warm	Supporting role	iQIYI
2026	Fool In Love	Pite	Supporting role	iQIYI
2026	My Secret Boyfriends	Dan Khunusorn Phromsri	Main role	iQIYI

=== Music videos ===
Year	Song	Artist
2023	Just Kid(ding) รู้ว่าเด็ก	JustmineNika
2023	ซ่อนยังไงให้เธอรู้ (Hide and Seek)	paiiinntt
2024	พูดไม่ฟัง (Comeback No Comeback)	DICE
2024	ใครทำนาย (Destine It Yourself)	Cast of the Chulalongkorn University musical
