= Phachara Suansri =

Thai actor and singer (born 1998)

- พชร สวนศรี
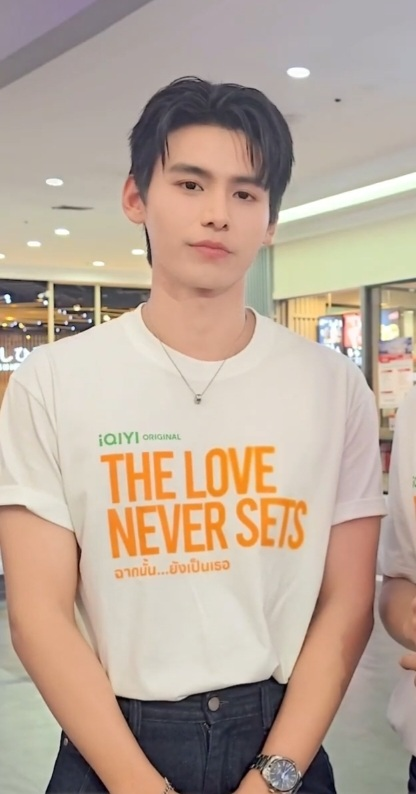
- Phachara in October 2025
- Born: April 6, 1998 (age 28); Bangkok, Thailand
- Other name: Ja (จา)
- Occupations: Actor; singer
- Years active: 2018–present

Phachara Suansri (Thai: พชร สวนศรี; born 6 April 1998), nicknamed Ja (Thai: จา), is a Thai actor, singer, pilot, and businessman. He played roles in the television series TharnType 2: 7 Years of Love (2020), Don't Say No (2021), Remember Me (2022) and The Love Never Sets (2025).

== Early life and education ==
Ja was born in Bangkok, Thailand. In September 2020, he graduated from the Civil Aviation Training Center.

== Career ==
Phachara began his acting career in 2018 with a supporting role in the series Beauty Boy.

In 2020, he had a supporting role in TharnType as Leo. In 2021, he reprised his role as Leo in Don't Say No.

In 2025, he starred as Saint in The Love Never Sets.

== Filmography ==
=== Television ===
Year	Title	Role	Notes	Network
2018	Beauty Boy	Namnuea	Supporting role	Channel 3
2019	Until We Meet Again	Sin	Guest role	LINE TV, iQIYI
2020	TharnType 2: 7 Years of Love	Leo	Supporting role	LINE TV, One 31
2021	Close Friend	Xin	Main role	Viu
2021	Don't Say No	Leo	Main role	LINE TV, One 31
2022	Remember Me	Golf	Main role	Amarin TV 34 HD, iQIYI
2023	Be Mine, Superstar	Punn Setthaphakdi	Main role	Channel 3, iQIYI
2024	Love Sea	Wit	Guest role	GMM 25, iQIYI
2025	The Love Never Sets	Saint	Main role	iQIYI
