= Remember Me (Thai TV series) =

Thai boys' love drama television series (2022–2023)

- ความรักเขียนด้วยความรัก
- Genre: Boys' love (BL); Drama; Romance; Coming-of-age
- Written by: Nutt Nutthakorn Phorntiramongkol
- Directed by: Snook Jukkruw Nipitpon Muangsinun
- Starring: Chalongrat Novsamrong; Phachara Suansri; Teshin Anusananan; Supakrit Charoonmatha; Phiravich Attachitsataporn; Tanatorn Saenangkanikorn
- Country of origin: Thailand
- Original language: Thai
- No. of seasons: 1
- No. of episodes: 14

Production
- Executive producer: Phiravich Attachitsataporn
- Running time: 44 minutes
- Production company: Ultimate Troop

Original release
- Network: Amarin TV HD 34; 3Plus; iQIYI
- Release: 9 October 2022 – 8 January 2023

Remember Me (Thai: ความรักเขียนด้วยความรัก) is a Thai boys' love drama television series produced by Ultimate Troop. The series stars Chalongrat Novsamrong (First), Phachara Suansri (Ja), Teshin Anusananan (Title), Supakrit Charoonmatha (Mamean), Phiravich Attachitsataporn (Mean), and Tanatorn Saenangkanikorn (Title).

The series aired on Amarin TV HD 34 from 9 October 2022 to 8 January 2023.

== Synopsis ==
The series follows a group of friends through different eras of communication technology, from handwritten letters and MSN Messenger to BlackBerry Messenger (BBM) and LINE. While technology brings people closer together, their personal relationships often move in the opposite direction, testing friendships, romances, and family bonds.

Each story arc revolves around a different form of communication, exploring how technological changes influence the characters' relationships and personal growth.

== Cast ==
=== Main ===
- Chalongrat Novsamrong as Gun
- Phachara Suansri as Golf
- Teshin Anusananan as Name
- Supakrit Charoonmatha as Em
- Phiravich Attachitsataporn as Naknan (Nan)
- Tanatorn Saenangkanikorn as Champ

=== Supporting ===
- Pariya Wongrabieb as Gun's mother
- Anna Chuanchuen as Champ's grandfather
- Puttachat Pongsuchat as Champ's mother
- Jumpol Thongtan as Champ and Cha-em's father
- Punyawee Sukkulworasate
- Chollatorn Pratchyaroongroj as Cha-em
- Suphach Tawsagun as NoName
- Ramil Sasit Chatpiroonpun as Young Gun

=== Guest appearances ===
- Tonnam Piamchon Damrongsunthornchai as a phone salesman (ep. 10)
- Pepper Pongpat Unhapipatpong as Pu (eps. 10–14)
- Kong Montree Pattarachitphinyo as Dream
- Aom Pongsapak Tantinarawat
- Peak Natchanon Chaipongpati
- Narongdet Rungarun (Dech)

== Soundtrack ==
Year	Title	Artist	Notes
2022	"Khokhwam Thi Fak Wai" (ข้อความที่ฝากไว้)	Cheriie (Pichsinee Saejung)	Official soundtrack

== Production ==
The series was produced by Ultimate Troop and announced during the 3Plus Line Up 2022: We Belong Together event. Director Snook Jukkruw Nipitpon Muangsinun stated that the series was conceived as a reflection on the evolution of human communication through different technologies used between the 2000s and 2020s, with letters, MSN Messenger, BlackBerry Messenger, and LINE serving as central narrative devices. According to the production team, one of the main challenges was recreating objects and software that were no longer in common use, requiring additional work from the art, costume, and graphic design departments.

== Release ==
The series premiered on 9 October 2022 on Amarin TV HD 34, airing weekly on Sundays at 22:30. Episodes were later made available on the 3Plus streaming platform. Internationally, the series was distributed through iQIYI and Rakuten Viki.

== Promotion ==
In October 2022, the six lead actors participated in True Insider Special Talk to promote the series. During the broadcast period, members of the cast participated in interviews, media appearances, and promotional events related to the series.

== Reception ==
Remember Me received positive audience reviews. On Rakuten Viki, the series holds a rating of 8.9/10 based on more than 7,000 user reviews. On iQIYI, the series achieved a score of 9.6/10 based on more than 3,000 ratings. Digital More included Remember Me among its recommendations of notable Thai BL series released in 2023.

== Events ==
Date	Event	Venue	Location
1 October 2022	Remember Me Press Conference	Bangkok Art and Culture Centre	Bangkok, Thailand
27 November 2022	Remember Me Special Episode	Paragon Cineplex	Bangkok, Thailand
