= Natsakan Chairote =

Thai actor

- ณัฐสกรรจ์ ไชยโรจน์
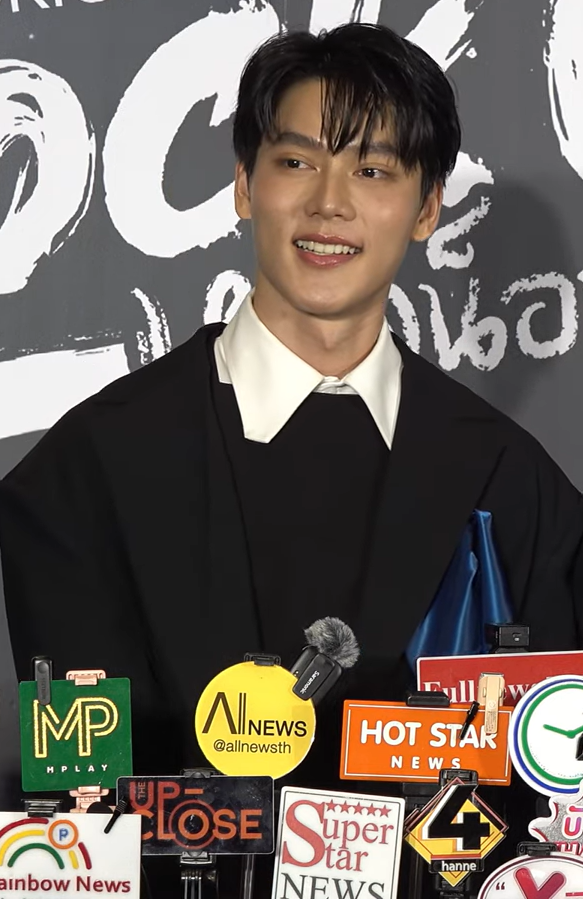
- Gun in 2025
- Born: 17 March 2003 (age 23); Thailand
- Other name: Gun (กันเนอร์)
- Occupation: Actor
- Years active: 2025–present

Natsakan Chairote (th:ณัฐสกรรจ์ ไชยโรจน์; born 17 March 2003), professionally known as Gun (กันเนอร), is a Thai actor. He is best known for his roles in Knock Out, Fourever You Part 2, Love of Silom, and Yesterday. In 2026, he appeared in Love Destiny and Be My Player Two.

== Biography and career ==
In 2023, Chairote was announced as part of the cast of the television series Shining Stars House.

In 2024, he was cast in the lead role of the WeTV original series Knock Out.

In 2026, he appeared in Fourever You Part 2, Love of Silom, and Yesterday. He also joined the cast of Love Destiny and was cast in Be My Player Two. In July 2026, Headliner Thailand officially introduced Gunner and Waiyakorn Wongkhakaew (Newton) as an on-screen pairing under the name GunnerNewton. Their first project as a pairing is the WeTV Original series Be My Player Two.

== Filmography ==
=== Television ===
Year	Title	Role	Notes	Network
2025	Knock Out	Than	Main role	WeTV
2025	Fourever You Part 2	Khram	Guest role	WeTV
2026	Love of Silom	Chenphop Udomdirek (Chen)	Guest role	WeTV
2026	Yesterday	Rawit	Supporting role	WeTV
2026	Love Destiny	Chao Fa Noi	Supporting role	Channel 3
2026	Be My Player Two	Jack (Jjack)	Supporting role	WeTV

== Awards and nominations ==
Year	Award	Category	Result	Ref.
2025	Thailand Box Office Awards	Outstanding Rising Star Award	Nominated	
