= Koraphat Lamnoi =

Thai actor, model and singer (born 2000)

- กรภัทร์ ลำน้อย
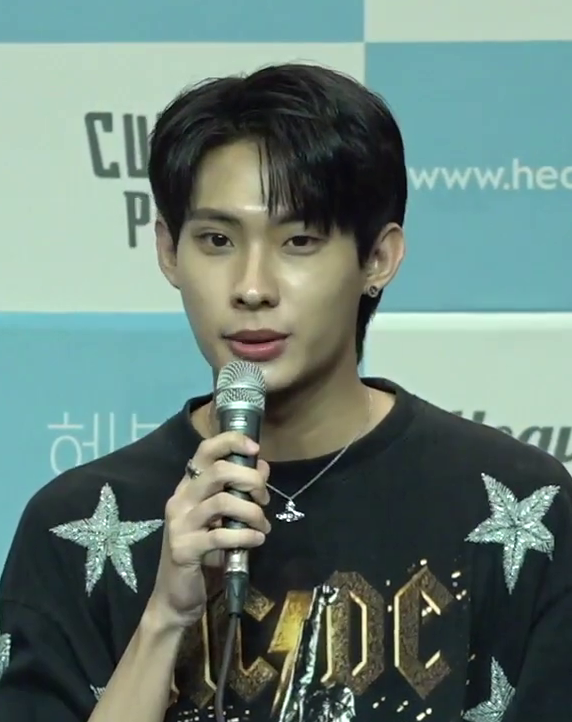
- Koraphat in June 2022
- Born: 4 September 2000 (age 26); Nan province, Thailand
- Other name: Tutor (ติวเตอร์)
- Occupations: Actor; singer; YouTuber
- Years active: 2021–present
- Agent: Domundi TV
- Height: 180 cm (5 ft 11 in)
- Musical career
- Genre: T-pop
- Label: DMD Music
- Member of: DEXX

Koraphat Lamnoi (Thai: กรภัทร์ ลำน้อย; born 4 September 2000), nicknamed Tutor (Thai: ติวเตอร์), is a Thai actor, singer and YouTuber. He is a member of the boy group DEXX. He is best known for his roles in Cutie Pie (2022), The Middleman's Love (2023), and Battle of the Writers (2024). In 2026, he stars in the series ChermChey.

== Early life and education ==
Koraphat was born in Nan province, Thailand. In 2024, he graduated from the Faculty of Business Administration at the University of the Thai Chamber of Commerce, majoring in finance.

== Career ==
Tutor was a member of the Domundi TV "Hot-boys Gang", which produced song and dance covers and travel shows on their YouTube channel. In 2021, he made his television acting debut as a soldier in A Tale of Thousand Stars.

In 2022, Tutor appeared in Cutie Pie as Nuer, a university student, classmate of the protagonist Kuea (Chawarin Perdpiriyawong) and romantic partner of Prarinyakorn Kansawa (Yim). In 2023, Tutor and Yim reprised their roles in Naughty Babe and starred in The Middleman's Love.

In 2024, Tutor played Shan in the series Battle of the Writers. In 2025, he played Win, a supporting character in the series Zomvivor.

In June 2025, Domundi announced the formation of a six-member boy group named DEXX under DMD Music, consisting of James, Tutor, Yim, Auau, Por, and TeeTee. The group debuted with their first single "Clang Clang" on 24 June 2025.

== Discography ==
=== Singles ===
==== Soundtrack appearances ====
Year	Title	Album	Ref.
2022	"เป็นไปได้ไหมเธอ (Suddenly)"	Cutie Pie OST	
2024	"I Want to Keep You in My Eyes" (with Yim)	Battle of the Writers OST	
2024	"Best to See You" (with Yim)	Battle of the Writers OST	
2024	"อบอุ่น (You)"	Battle of the Writers OST	
2024	"What Do You Think"	Battle of the Writers OST	
2024	"I Want to Keep You in My Eyes" (Thai version) (with Yim)	Battle of the Writers OST	
2026	"รักได้แล้ว (Next Status)" (with DEXX)	Duang with You OST	

== Filmography ==
=== Television series ===
Year	Title	Role	Network	Notes	Ref.
2021	A Tale of Thousand Stars	Soldier	GMM 25	Guest role (Ep. 8)	
2022	Cutie Pie	Nuer	Workpoint TV	Supporting role	
2023	Bed Friend	Mai Pakin	One 31, iQIYI	Guest role	
2023	Naughty Babe	Nuea	One 31, iQIYI	Supporting role	
2023	The Middleman's Love	Mai Pakin	One 31, iQIYI	Main role	
2024	Battle of the Writers	Shan	iQIYI	Main role	
2025	Zomvivor	Kawin / Win	Netflix	Supporting role	
2026	Love Upon a Time	Roong	Workpoint TV	Guest role (Ep. 8)	
2026	ChermChey	Intha	TrueVisions Now	Main role	
2026	The D Dorm	Drip	One 31	Main role	
TBA	Restart			Supporting role	
TBA	The Scent of Sorrow	Pikhan		Main role	
TBA	Zomvivor Chapter 2	Kawin / Win		Supporting role	
TBA	Friend Benefit			Supporting role	

=== Television show ===
Year	Title	Network	Notes
2022	T-Pop Stage Show	Workpoint TV	Ep. 35 (30 April 2022)
2022	คู่มันส์ Fun Day	True Inside	23 October 2022
2023	คุณพระช่วย Khun Pra Chuay	Workpoint TV	23 July 2023
2023	หัวท้ายตายก่อน The First and Last Thailand	Workpoint TV	Ep. 79 (31 July 2023)
2023	4 ต่อ 4 Celebrity	One 31	Ep. 812 (10 September 2023)
2023	โตมาเป็น Grow Up to Be	One Playground	Ep. 1
2024	Sawatdee Khrap T-Boys!! 今、注目すべきタイのトップアーティストに密着	TV Tokyo, TVer	
2024	Who Is My Chef	Workpoint TV	Ep. 301 (13 December 2024)
2025	T-Pop Stage	Workpoint TV	26 June 2025
2025	Thailand Music Countdown	Channel 3	Ep. 12 (3 August 2025)
2025	รอบวัน Rop Wan	One 31	16 October 2025
2026	3Fight3 Basket Boy Season 2	Workpoint TV	Team Black
2026	โตมาเป็น Grow Up to Be	Asok Montri	Ep. 24
2026	Who Is My Chef	Workpoint TV	Ep. 366 (13 March 2026)

=== Web series ===
Year	Title	Role	Notes	Ref.
2023	Our Winter		Main role	
2023	Crush on You		Main role	
2023	Mission Fan-Possible	Porpor	Main role	
2023	Jun & Jun		Cameo (Ep. 6)	
