= The Middleman's Love =

2023 Thai television series

- Official series poster
- Thai: พี่เจตคนกลาง
- Literally: The Middleman's Love
- Genre: Boys' love; Romantic comedy
- Based on: Middleman's Love by Littlebbear96
- Screenplay by: Wanna Kortunyavat; Wannapa Lertkultanon; Thidaphon Phrueksamaswong
- Directed by: Thanamin Wongskulphat
- Starring: Prarinyakorn Kansawa; Koraphat Lamnoi
- Opening theme: "Middleman (คนกลาง)" by Parkmalody
- Country of origin: Thailand
- Original language: Thai
- No. of episodes: 8

Production
- Producer: Kittipat Champa
- Cinematography: Nattheerith Boonsaen; Wisarut Netkeng
- Running time: 48–74 minutes
- Production company: Domundi TV

Original release
- Network: One 31; iQIYI; GagaOOLala; YouTube (Mandee Channel)
- Release: 10 November – 29 December 2023

The Middleman's Love (Thai: พี่เจตคนกลาง) is a Thai romantic comedy boys' love series produced by Domundi TV, starring Prarinyakorn Kansawa (Yim) and Koraphat Lamnoi (Tutor), and directed by Thanamin Wongskulphat (Cheewin).

The series aired from 10 November to 29 December 2023. It was broadcast on One 31 and made available on iQIYI, GagaOOLala and YouTube via the Mandee Channel.

== Synopsis ==
Jade (Prarinyakorn Kansawa) is the middle child and often feels left out. He did just okay in school, and even if he's a competent graphic designer at work, he's not exactly the star of the office: his siblings and friends seem more successful and popular, which only makes him feel like he's always stuck in second place. Then Mai (Koraphat Lamnoi), a charismatic and popular intern, starts showing interest. Jade figures it's the same old stories, he's just the middleman again, thinking Mai is actually into his coworker Uea's intern Gus. Turns out Mai is genuinely interested in Jade, who is then forced to face his own insecurities and the way he sees himself.

== Cast and characters ==
=== Main ===
- Prarinyakorn Kansawa (Yim) as Jetaniphat (Jade)
- Koraphat Lamnoi (Tutor) as Pakin (Mai)

=== Supporting ===
- Siraphop Manithikhun (Net) as King Kunakorn
- Supamongkon Wongwisut (James) as Uea Anol
- Thanaphat Khajornchaikul (Tai) as Gus (Uea's intern)
- Peerapun Chungcharoenpanich (Leo) as Tong (King's intern)
- Teetut Chungmanirat (Thomas) as Gun
- Sorntast Buangam (Mark) as Bas
- Parnupat Anomakiti (Park) as Mongkol
- Amarin Nitibhon (Am) as Jade's father
- Nicole Theriault as Jade's mother
- Sattaphong Phiangphor (Tao) as Jet (Jade's brother)
- Inpalee Chotiruntananon (Ingkho) as Jan

=== Guest ===
- Pete Thongchua as Mai's father
- Pympan Chalayanacupt (Pym) as Mai's mother
- Anupart Luangsodsai (Ngern) as Man
- Gun Tieosuwan as Top
- Jakkaphet Phiban (Petch) as Petch
- Thakrit Chaiwut (Shell) as Boom
- Nichapat Sujipinyo (Nycha) appears briefly in episode 4, uncredited

== Soundtrack ==
The Middleman's Love Soundtrack
No.	Title	Writer(s)	Artist	Length
1.	"Middleman (คนกลาง)"	Ballchon	Parkmalody	3:37
2.	"Person in My Heart (คนกลางใจ)"	Piyawat Meekruea	Jennis; Ingkho (Pixxie)	3:53
3.	"One Word (คำพูดคำเดียว)"	Kittipat Champa	Net Siraphop	4:28

== Production ==
The series is based on the novel Middleman's Love by Littlebbear96, originally published on Thai online platforms.

At first, Karn Kritsanaphan (Jimmy) and Sittichok Pueakpoolpol (Tommy) were supposed to play the leads. The series started filming on 10 May 2022 along with Bed Friend, another story by littlebbear96 set in the same universe, but on 15 August, Mandee Work announced that, due to personal issues involving Jimmy, both the actors had decided to withdraw, and filming was paused indefinitely. Ultimately, Koraphat Lamnoi (Tutor) and Prarinyakorn Kansawa (Yim) were brought in, after having already played a secondary couple in Cutie Pie (2022).

Filming happened throughout 2023, and the series was directed by Thanamin Wongskulphat (Cheewin), who had worked on Why R U? and Bed Friend.

== Release ==
The series premiered on 10 November 2023, with new episodes airing every Friday. There were eight episodes in total, each about 49 minutes long. The final episode aired on 29 December 2023. Two versions were released. The standard version, with 49-minute episodes, aired on One31 and was also available on GagaOOLala and YouTube. The Uncut version, which runs 74 minutes per episode, came out exclusively on iQIYI with extra scenes that didn't make it to TV.

== Reception ==
The series got attention from the Thai press, especially for the chemistry between Tutor and Yim. Thairath highlighted the pair as one of the most popular couples of the year, talking about how well they work together both on and off screen.
