= TharnType season 2 =

Second season of the One31 television series

TharnType
- Season 2
- Promotional poster
- Starring: Suppasit Jongcheveevat; Kanawut Traipipattanapong
- No. of episodes: 12 + 1 special episode

Release
- Original network: One 31; LINE TV
- Original release: November 6, 2020 – January 29, 2021

TharnType 2: 7 Years of Love is the second season of the Thai boys' love television series TharnType, which premiered on November 6, 2020. It stars Suppasit Jongcheveevat and Kanawut Traipipattanapong.

== Cast and characters ==
=== Main ===
- Suppasit Jongcheveevat as Tharn Thara Kirigun
- Kanawut Traipipattanapong as Type Thiwat Phawattakun

=== Supporting ===
- Chalongrat Novsamrong as Fiat
- Phachara Suansri as Leo
- Napat Sinnakuan as Champ
- Phat Prayunviwat as Dr. Khunpol
- Tanatorn Saenangkanikorn as Phugun
- Sarunsathorn Tanawatcharawat as Cirrus
- Becky Armstrong as Thanya
- Thanayut Thakoonauttaya as Thorn
- Suttinut Uengtrakul as Techno
- Petchpailin Chitcharoon as Amy

== Production ==
=== Development ===
In early February 2020, it was announced that a second season to TharnType will be produced. Skincare entrepreneur Golf Akaranun, who owns Hira Blue, made a surprise announcement during the TharnType fan meeting in Thailand that he will personally finance the production for a second season.

=== Casting ===
Cast members Suppasit and Kanawut were confirmed to reprise their roles in the sequel. It was announced that auditions for new characters will take place on the February 22, 2020. The first workshop was held on May 3, 2020. On June 12, 2020, the new cast members were announced via a Twitter post and a YouTube video. A mini documentary of the audition process for second season's characters titled Yicon Thailand started airing on July 6, 2020.

=== Filming ===
A worship ceremony for the drama was held on June 29, 2020. The new director, Passawut Sukbua was announced, since departure of the season one director, Bundit Sintanaparadee, from the series. Filming started on July 2, 2020.

== Soundtrack ==
Song title	Artist
ข้างเธอ ("Beside You")	Off Chainon
เธอ...ที่เดินเข้ามา ("Love's Coming")	NooNa Neungthida
เหม่อไม่ได้มอง ("Your Sights")	Arm Kornkan
ลองเป็นฉัน ("Feel Me")	Bie Thassapak
เธอคือโลกทั้งใบ ("My World")	Nont Tanont
"In My Life"	Kleytton Herivelto
