= Thanaphon U-sinsap =

Thai actor (born 2000)

- ธนพล อู่สินทรัพย์
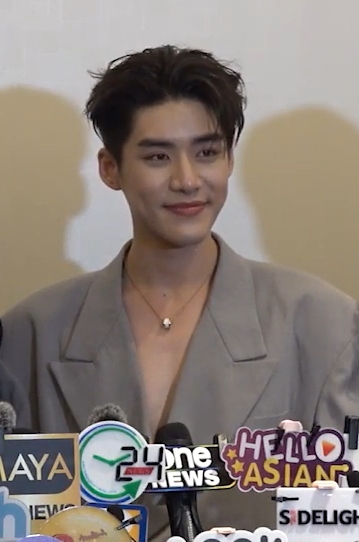
- Thanaphon in 2024
- Born: 4 July 2000 (age 26); Thailand
- Other names: Leng (เล้ง), 小冷
- Education: Kasetsart University
- Occupation: Actor
- Years active: 2021–present
- Agents: Change2561 (2022-2024); GMMTV (2024-2026); Century UU (2026-Present)
- Known for: Q in Kidnap; Gaew / Great in Love Destiny
- Height: 1.8 m (5 ft 11 in)
- Website: GMMTV Artists

Thanaphon U-sinsap (Thai: ธนพล อู่สินทรัพย์; born 4 July 2000), nicknamed Leng (Thai: เล้ง), is a Thai actor who formerly worked under GMMTV. He made his acting debut in 2021 in the series The Folly of Human Ambition, appeared in Oh, Teacher Khong in 2022, starred in the BL series Kidnap on GMMTV and Netflix in 2024, starred in Mu-Te-Luv in 2025, and starred in Love Destiny in 2026.

== Career ==
In 2024, Thanaphon landed his first leading role in Kidnap (ลับ-จ้าง-รัก), playing Q (Harit Yuenyongwisut) alongside Pawat Chittsawangdee (Ohm). In November 2024, during GMMTV's "Riding the Wave" event, it was announced that Thanaphon and Pawat would star together in Only Friends: Dream On. In March 2025, GMMTV officially announced that duo would end their partnership as an on-screen pair. As a result, both were replaced in future projects. Thanaphon left the cast of Only Friends: Dream On, replaced by actor Tharatorn Jantharaworakarn (Boom). In 2025, he starred in the segment Hello, Is This Luck? of GMMTV's anthology series MuTeLuv, playing Nine. In July 2026, is he starred in Love Destiny, playing Gaew / Great, a BL remake of the hit 2018 Thai series alongside Vachiravit Paisarnkulwong (August). Thanaphon left GMMTV on November 1, 2026.

== Filmography ==
=== Television series ===
Year	Title	Role	Notes	Network	Ref.
2021	The Folly of Human Ambition	Big	Guest role	Amarin TV 34 HD	
2022	Oh, Teacher Khong	Tong	Guest role	Workpoint TV	
2024	Kidnap	"Q" Harit Yuenyongwisut	Main role	GMM 25	
2025	MuTeLuv: Hello, Is This Luck?	Nine	Main role	GMM 25	
2026	Love Destiny	Gaew / Great	Main role	Channel 3 HD	

=== Music video appearances ===
Year	Title	Artist	Label	Ref.
2024	"แข็งใจ (Hard-Hearted)"; Kidnap OST	Ohm Pawat	GMMTV Records	
2026	"โอ้...หัวใจ (Oh...My Heart)"; Love Destiny OST	August Vachiravit	CUU Entertainment	

== Discography ==
=== Singles ===
==== Soundtrack appearances ====
Year	Title	Soundtrack	Label	Ref.
2024	"รักพา (Love Leads)" with Ohm Pawat	Kidnap OST	GMMTV Records	
2024	"มากพอ (More Than Enough)"	Kidnap OST	GMMTV Records	
2026	"有你的烟火 (Destiny Sparks)" with August Vachiravit	Love Destiny OST	CUU Entertainment	
