= The Love Never Sets =

2025 Thai television series

- ฉากนั้น…ยังเป็นเธอ
- Genre: Romance; Drama; Boys' love
- Based on: Ai Ru Yong Zhou by Ni Zhoumo You Le
- Written by: Sarun Kaensap (Myminorh); Sedthawut Inboon (Chim)
- Directed by: Bundit Sintanaparadee (Tee)
- Starring: Phachara Suansri (Ja); Weerapat Toemmaneerat (Tae); Nikita Parkin; Jutarat Thanapan (JaJa)
- Country of origin: Thailand
- Original language: Thai
- No. of episodes: 13

Production
- Running time: 60 minutes
- Production companies: Deep House; Red Elephant Entertainment

Original release
- Network: iQIYI
- Release: 14 October 2025 – 6 January 2026

The Love Never Sets (Thai: ฉากนั้น…ยังเป็นเธอ) is a 2025 Thai boys' love television series starring Phachara Suansri (Ja) and Weerapat Toemmaneerat (Tae). Based on the Chinese danmei novel Ai Ru Yong Zhou by Ni Zhoumo You Le, the series aired on iQIYI from 14 October 2025 to 6 January 2026.

== Synopsis ==
Ice (Weerapat Toemmaneerat) is a young man whose life was shattered when his father's debt forced him into shooting adult content. He dropped out of university for one year. Upon returning, he is assigned to be mentored by Saint (Phachara Suansri), a senior with whom he shares a troubled past. Forced to work together on a short film, their initial rivalry gradually transforms into a deeper connection as they confront their past and heal old wounds.

== Cast ==
=== Main ===
- Phachara Suansri (Ja) as Saint
- Weerapat Toemmaneerat (Tae) as Ice
- Nikita Parkin as Sea
- Jutarat Thanapan (JaJa) as Lanee

=== Supporting ===
- Kitmongkhon Phontad (Domon) as Mud
- Piyawat Kunrapankanrayakon (Atom) as Book
- Nutthawut Eamchuen (Bonus) as Warm

== Production ==
The series is based on the Chinese danmei novel Ai Ru Yong Zhou (Love Like an Endless Day) by Ni Zhoumo You Le. A premiere event was held on 14 October 2025 at SF World Cinema, Central World, attended by the cast and production team. A final episode screening event was held on 6 January 2026 at SF World Cinema, Central World.

== Original soundtrack ==
The song "Red Sunflower" was released as the official soundtrack, performed by Ja Phachara and Tae Weerapat.

== Broadcast ==
The series aired on iQIYI from 14 October 2025 to 6 January 2026, with 13 episodes released weekly on Tuesdays.
