= Kidnap (Thai TV series) =

2024 Thai television series

- Thai: ลับ-จ้าง-รัก
- Genre: Romantic drama; Action
- Screenplay by: Sornpanath Patpho; Suwanun Pohgudsai; Chalermpong Udomsilp; Nontachai Vinyousupornchai
- Directed by: Attaporn Teemarkorn
- Starring: Pawat Chittsawangdee; Thanaphon U-sinsap
- Opening theme: "แค่จากนี้ไปเราไม่ปล่อยมือ (From Now On)" by Tui Chayatorn
- Composers: Orave Pinijsarapirom; Achariya Dulyapaiboon; Supakorn Jermcharoen
- Country of origin: Thailand
- Original language: Thai
- No. of episodes: 12

Production
- Executive producers: Sataporn Panichraksapong; Darapa Choeysanguan
- Cinematography: Pichet Talao
- Running time: 40-45 minutes
- Production companies: GMMTV; Anda99

Original release
- Network: GMM 25; Netflix
- Release: 6 September – 22 November 2024

Kidnap (Thai: ลับ-จ้าง-รัก, lit. 'Secret-Hired-Love') is a 2024 Thai boys' love television series series starring Pawat Chittsawangdee (Ohm) and Thanaphon U-sinsap. The series aired on GMM 25 from September 6, 2024, to November 22, 2024, with weekly episodes on Fridays and was also available on Netflix.

Directed by Attaporn Teemarkorn and produced by GMMTV and Anda99, it was announced during GMMTV'S UP&ABOVE PART 1 event on 17 October 2023.

== Synopsis ==
A "kidnapping" plan suddenly changes into a "kill" order, forcing Min (Pawat Chittsawangdee), who accepts the job to earn money to help his sick brother, to save Q (Thanaphon U-sinsap). From two people with completely different lives, they are forced to live together, developing a strong bond and an inseparable love. But their thriving relationship is fraught with danger and traumatic past events that will test Min and Q's love. Will they be able to overcome these hardships together?

== Cast and characters ==
=== Main ===
- Pawat Chittsawangdee (Ohm) as Athikhun Monkolsit (Min)
- Thanaphon U-sinsap (Leng) as Harit Yuenyongwisut (Q)

=== Supporting ===
- Thipakorn Thitathan (Ohm) as Athiphat Monkolsit (Men)
- Phromphiriya Thongputtaruk (Papang) as Suea
- Kirati Puangmalee (Title) as James
- Napapat Sattha-atikom (Chelsea) as Khanomjeen
- Supoj Janjareonborn (Lift) as Khacha Yuenyongwisut
- Pympan Chalayanacupt (Pym) as Yada
- Pitisak Yaowananon (Tae) as Phum
- Teeradech Vitheepanich (Tee) as Third

== Original soundtrack ==
The official soundtrack for Kidnap features:

Song	Artist(s)	Label	Ref.
"แค่จากนี้ไปเราไม่ปล่อยมือ (From Now On)"	Tui Chayatorn	GMMTV Records	
"รักพา (Love Leads)"	Ohm Pawat and Leng Thanaphon	GMMTV Records	
"แข็งใจ (Hard-Hearted)"	Ohm Pawat	GMMTV Records	
"มากพอ (More Than Enough)"	Leng Thanaphon	GMMTV Records	

== Production ==
The series was produced by GMMTV and directed by Attaporn Teemarkorn. Originally presented as a show surrounding a growing friendship between the two male leads, production announced a name change for the series to better reflect its writing and thus changed the show over to the boys' love genre. Formerly named "ลับ-จ้าง-ลัก" (lit. 'Secret-Hired-Theft'), it was changed to "ลับ-จ้าง-รัก" (lit. 'Secret-Hired-Love').

== Release ==
The series premiered on 6 September 2024, airing on GMM 25 on Fridays at 8:30 p.m. (local time). Episodes became available on Netflix starting at 9:30 p.m. the same day The final episode aired on 22 November 2024.

== Reception ==
The series was well received by audiences and critics. Lifestyle Asia gave the production a perfect score (5/5), highlighting the chemistry between the leads, the production quality, and the way the series addresses themes such as family trauma and financial struggles. The performances of Ohm Pawat and Leng Thanaphon were praised, as well as the gradual development of the relationship between Min and Q, which evolves from a relationship of distrust into something deeper.
