= Bake Me Please =

2023 Thai television series

- พิชิตใจ นายสายหวาน
- Genre: Boys' love, Drama, Romance
- Written by: Piyaros Sunthornwiphart, Danuphon Chaimueanwong
- Directed by: Kanchanapun Meesuwan
- Country of origin: Thailand
- Original language: Thai
- No. of seasons: 1
- No. of episodes: 6

Production
- Running time: 60 minutes

Original release
- Network: Channel 8, TrueID, Viki
- Release: November 19 – December 24, 2023

Bake Me Please (Thai: พิชิตใจ นายสายหวาน) is a 2023 Thai television series broadcast on Channel 8 and TrueID, with international distribution on Viki. Directed by Kanchanapun Meesuwan, the main cast includes Thitiwat Ritprasert (Ohm), Kantapon Chompupan (Guide), and Phuripan Sapsangsawat (Poom).

== Synopsis ==
Shin, a chef known for his strict personality, decides to open a bakery with two friends. To balance the atmosphere, Peach is invited to join, bringing his warm nature and skills learned from his grandmother. Their differences soon lead to a baking competition, where Peach surprises everyone with his talent and earns recognition. What begins as rivalry gradually evolves into deeper feelings, while Guy, another colleague, also grows closer, adding complexity to the relationships.

== Cast and characters ==
=== Main ===
- Thitiwat Ritprasert (Ohm) as Shin
- Kantapon Chompupan (Guide) as Peach
- Phuripan Sapsangsawat (Poom) as Guy

=== Supporting ===
- Nathaphop Kanjanteak (Atom) as Atom
- Thanaunop Patum (Prame) as Oab
- Nawinwit Kittichanawit (Tawan) as Per

== Production ==
The series was developed as part of Channel 8's BL drama programming, with scripts by Piyaros Sunthornwiphart and Danuphon Chaimueanwong. The production aimed to combine romance with culinary themes, highlighting the chemistry between the leads.

== Broadcast ==
Bake Me Please premiered on November 19, 2023, and concluded on December 24, 2023, with 6 episodes of approximately 60 minutes each. Episodes aired weekly on Sundays via Channel 8 and TrueID, with international distribution on Viki.

== Reception ==
Bake Me Please received attention from Thai and international media. JWave highlighted the series’ debut on Viki and praised its lighthearted romance combined with culinary themes. Abstractaf described the show as entertaining but noted that some narrative elements felt underdeveloped. The Manila Bulletin emphasized the chemistry between the leads and the enthusiasm of fans, mentioning the possibility of international fan meetings.
