= Bed Friend =

2023 Thai television series

- Official series poster
- Also known as: Bed Friend Series อย่าเล่นกับอนล
- Genre: Romance; BL
- Created by: littlebbear96
- Based on: อย่าเล่นกับอนล by littlebbear96
- Written by: Wanna Kortunyavat; Thidaporn Pruekmaswong
- Directed by: Thanamin Wongskulphat
- Starring: Supamongkon Wongwisut; Siraphop Manithikhun
- Opening theme: "Feel Fan (ไม่ชอบเป็นเพื่อนเธอ)" by Net Siraphop and James Su
- Ending theme: "Friends to Rest Our Hearts (เพื่อนพักใจ)" by Tommy Sittichok
- Country of origin: Thailand
- Original language: Thai
- No. of seasons: 1
- No. of episodes: 10

Production
- Producer: Aoftion Kittipat Jampa
- Running time: 45-50 minutes
- Production company: Domundi

Original release
- Network: One 31
- Release: February 18 – April 22, 2023

Related
- The Middleman's Love

Bed Friend (อย่าเล่นกับอนล; RTGS: Ya Len Kap Anon, lit. 'Don't Play with Anol') is a 2023 Thai boys' love romance drama television series, starring Supamongkon Wongwisut (James) and Siraphop Manithikhun (Net). It aired from 18 February to 22 April 2023 on One 31 with 10 episodes, while the uncut version was made available on IQIYI. The series was also released on GagaOOLala.

== Synopsis ==
Uea and King work together for the same company. After a couple of drinks that lead them to a one-night stand, they become friends with benefits.

== Cast and characters ==
=== Main ===
- Supamongkon Wongwisut (James) as Anol Nanthaphiwat (Uea), a graphic designer who had a childhood trauma.
- Siraphop Manithikhun (Net) as Kunakorn Suthikul (King), a computer programmer.

=== Supporting ===
- Prarinyakorn Kansawa (Yim) as Jetaniphat (Jade), Uea's best friend.
- Teetut Chungmanirat (Thomas) as Gun, Uea and King's colleague.
- Sorntast Buangam as Bas, Uea and King's boss.
- Parnupat Anomakiti (Park) as Mongkol, Uea and King's colleague.
- Thanatchaphan Buranachiwawilai (Bookko) as Muay, Uea and King's colleague.
- Warinda Damrongphol (Dada) as Faii, Uea and King's colleague.
- Ratchaneekorn Phanmanee (Tom) as Thida, Uea's mother.
- Passin Reungwoot (A) as Sorn, Uea's stepfather.
- Buntarika Singpha (Pang) as Tonkhao Nanthaphiwat, Uea's younger sister.
- Elisha Triwiwatkul (Hymn) as Pock, Uea's ex-boyfriend.
- Nattawat Plengsiriwat (Chane) as Krit, the nephew of the company boss.
- Apinan Prasertwattanakul (M) as the company boss and Krit's uncle.
- Jakkrit Ammarat (Ton) as King's father.
- Savitree Samipak (Tong) as King's mother.

=== Guest ===
- Thakrit Chaiwut (Shell) as Khun "Boom" (Ep. 1 and 9)
- Punyada Intarasukum (Azy) as party girl (Ep. 3)
- Janya Thanasawaangkoun (Ya) as Uea's aunt (Ep. 8)
- Koraphat Lamnoi (Tutor) as "Mai" Pakin (Ep. 10)

== Production ==
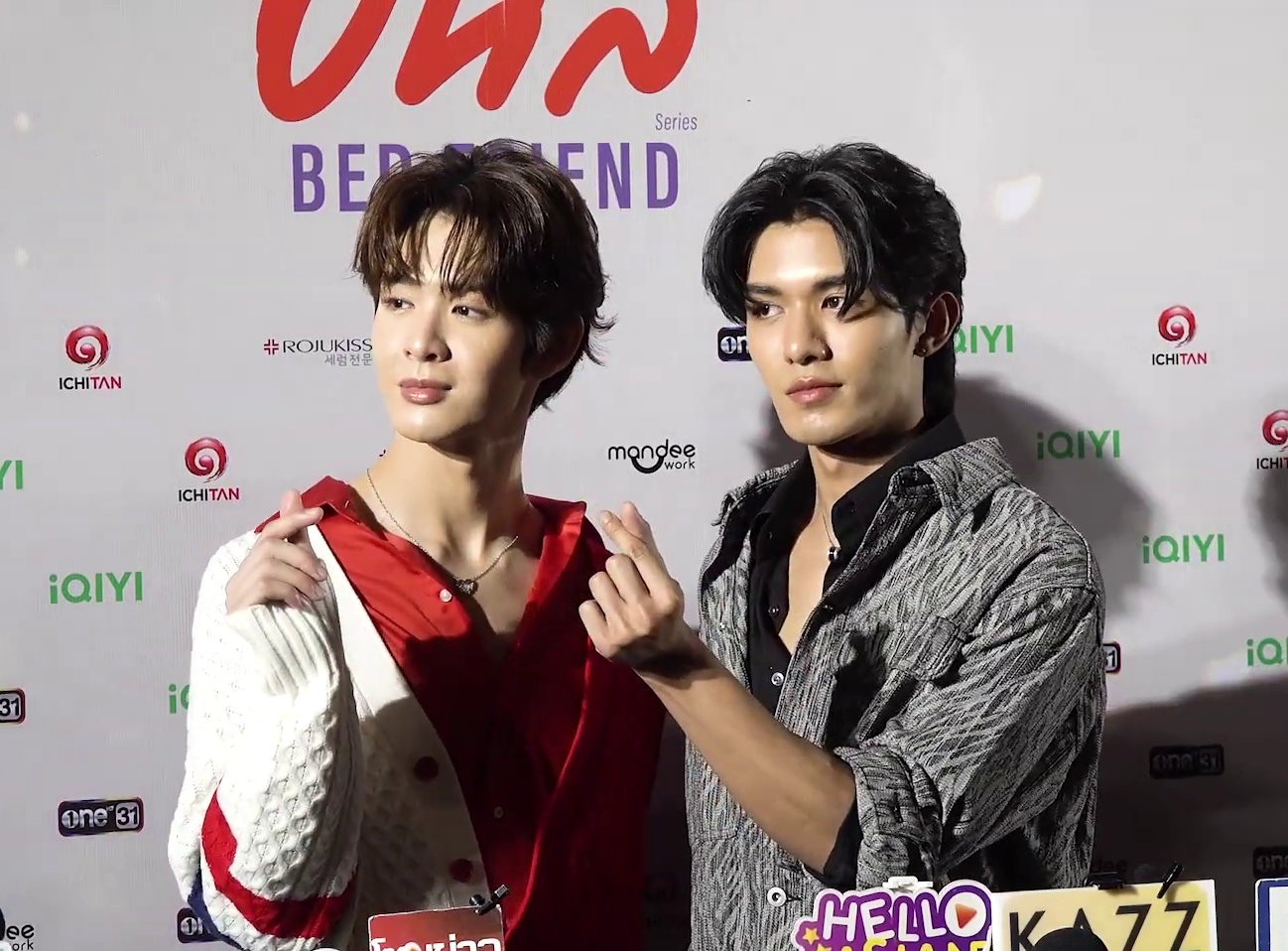
Supamongkon Wongwisut (left) and Siraphop Manithikhun (right) play Uea and King, respectively.

The production of Bed Friend, a TV adaptation of the web novel by littlebbear96, was announced on October 14, 2021 in light of a partnership between Mandee Work, Domundi and WeTV, with Supamongkon Wongwisut (James) and Siraphop Manithikhun (Net) playing an on-screen couple for the third time. Directed by Thanamin Wongskulphat, the series has characters in common with The Middleman's Love, another work by littlebbear96, and the two 8-episode series were expected to be produced at the same time, with Sittichok Pueakpoolpol (Tommy) and Karn Kritsanaphan (Jimmy) guest-starring in Bed Friend as Jade and Mai, the main characters of The Middleman's Love.

Filming for both series started on May 10, 2022. On August 15, Mandee Work announced that Kritsanaphan and Pueakpoolpol had decided to withdraw, and filming was paused indefinitely; thus, the production decided to re-film and air Bed Friend first. Ultimately, Koraphat Lamnoi (Tutor) and Prarinyakorn Kansawa (Yim) were cast as their replacement. Filming started once again on September 12, 2022 and ended on March 12, 2023. On the last day, Mandee Work announced a 2-episode extension, bringing the series to 10 episodes instead of the initially planned eight.

On December 13, 2022, Bed Friend was announced as part of Domundi's 2023 series line-up and a short pilot teaser was disclosed. The trailer was released on YouTube on February 8, 2023, while the series aired from February 18, preceded by a public screening of the first episode one week before.

Wongwisut and Manithikhun shared that filming their intimate scenes had been awkward at first; they also had to follow a strict diet and work out every day to stay in shape for their roles.

== Episodes ==
No.	Title	Original release date
1	"Episode 1"	18 February 2023
Uea and King work for the same company, but in different departments. Uea doesn't like King's flirtatious nature, but after a night out with their colleagues and a couple of drinks, they end up sleeping together. The following day, Uea demands King to forget everything.
2	"Episode 2"	25 February 2023
Uea apologizes to King for ignoring him and treating him badly after the night they spent together. King asks him to become friends with benefits, and although hesitant at first, Uea decides to give it a try.
3	"Episode 3"	4 March 2023
King and Uea lay down the rules for their secret friends-with-benefits arrangement. Uea's ex-boyfriend Pock approaches him in the office parking lot after being dumped for cheating, but is removed thanks to the intervention of Uea's friends; however, he comes back after a few days and assaults Uea one evening after work, when there's no one around.
4	"Episode 4"	11 March 2023
King rescues Uea from Pock. Uea visits his mother and sister for his birthday, but is plagued by memories of his stepfather sexually assaulting him as a teenager. The whole office goes on a trip to the seaside, and King and Uea end up sharing a room.
5	"Episode 5"	18 March 2023
King's mother wants to send him on a blind date, and both he and Uea are bothered by the proposal. King is jealous of the new manager Krit hitting on Uea.
6	"Episode 6"	25 March 2023
King and Uea's relationship has become deeper, but they struggle to acknowledge it, especially in light of King's arranged blind date.
7	"Episode 7"	1 April 2023
Krit tries to take advantage of Uea; King sees Uea flee the place and the two have a fight. Krit visiting Uea's family leads to a serious confrontation between Uea and his mother. In the end, Uea decides to quit his job and move out of the city, ending his friends-with-benefits arrangement with King.
8	"Episode 8"	8 April 2023
After discovering Uea has resigned, King tells Jade everything about them, asking for his help. He then joins Uea in Lampang and confesses his feelings. Back to the city, King reports Krit and has him fired, while Uea keeps his job because Jade did not submit his resignation letter.
9	"Episode 9"	15 April 2023
Uea gets his stepfather arrested for sexual harassment with the help of another one of his victims and King. Some months later, King introduces Uea to his mother.
10	"Episode 10"	22 April 2023
King and Uea enjoy a trip to the sea. Uea is slowly healing from his traumas and his mother doesn't contact him as ofter as before. One year later, King proposes to Uea.

== Original soundtrack ==
No.	Title	Artist	Length
1.	"Feel Fan" (ไม่ชอบเป็นเพื่อนเธอ)	Net Siraphop, James Su	3:53
2.	"Friends to Rest Our Hearts" (เพื่อนพักใจ)	Tommy Sittichok	4:29
3.	"Play Game" (เพลง ห้ามใจไม่ให้รักเธอ)	James Su	4:03
Total length:			12:25

== Awards and nominations ==
Name of award ceremony, year presented, award category, nominee of award, and result of nomination
Award	Year	Category	Nominee/work	Result	Ref.
Feed Y Capital Awards	2023	Popular Actor Award	Supamongkon Wongwisut	Nominated	
Feed Y Capital Awards	2023	Popular Series Award	Bed Friend	Nominated	
Howe Awards	2023	Hottest Series Award	Bed Friend	Nominated	
Kazz Awards	2024	Series of the Year	Bed Friend	Won	
Kazz Awards	2024	The Best Actor of the Year	Siraphop Manithikhun	Won	
Kazz Awards	2024	Rising Male of the Year	Supamongkon Wongwisut	Nominated	
Kazz Awards	2024	Most Popular Youth Award	Siraphop Manithikhun	3rd place	
Kazz Awards	2024	Most Popular Youth Award	Supamongkon Wongwisut	4th place	
Kazz Awards	2024	Couple of the Year	Supamongkon Wongwisut and Siraphop Manithikhun	Nominated	
Sanook Top of the Year Awards	2023	Best Couple of the Year	Supamongkon Wongwisut and Siraphop Manithikhun	Nominated	
Sanook Top of the Year Awards	2023	Best Series of the Year	Bed Friend	Nominated	
Shimo 3rd Anniversary Party	2023	Overseas Popular Actor of the Year	Siraphop Manithikhun	Won	
Shimo 3rd Anniversary Party	2023	Overseas Popular Actor of the Year	Supamongkon Wongwisut	Won	
