= Prarinyakorn Kansawa =

Thai actor, model and singer (born 2000)

- ปริญญากรณ์ ขันสวะ
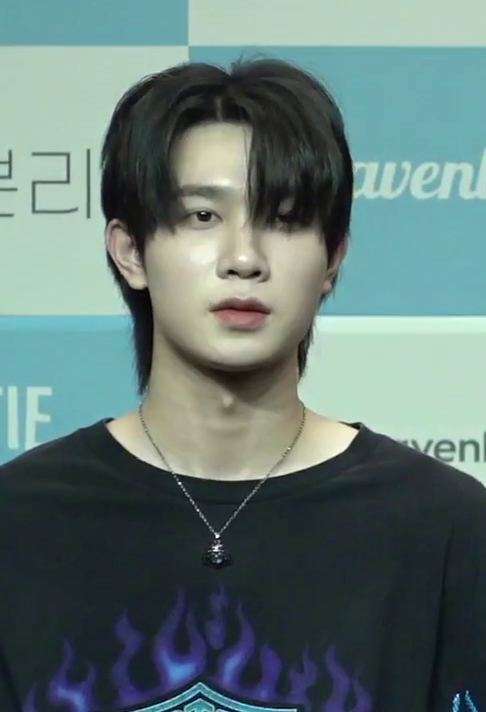
- Prarinyakorn in June 2022
- Born: 18 June 2000 (age 26); Lamphun, Thailand
- Other name: Yim (ยิม)
- Education: Bangkok University
- Occupations: Actor; singer
- Years active: 2022–present
- Agent: Domundi TV
- Height: 1.77 m (5 ft 10 in)
- Musical career
- Genre: T-pop
- Label: DMD Music
- Member of: DEXX

Prarinyakorn Kansawa (Thai: ปริญญากรณ์ ขันสวะ; born 18 June 2000), nicknamed Yim (Thai: ยิม), is a Thai actor under Domundi TV and a member of the Thai boy band DEXX under DMD Music.

He is best known for his roles in Cutie Pie (2022), The Middleman's Love (2023), and Battle of the Writers (2024) and ChermChey (2026).

== Early life and education ==
Prarinyakorn was born on 18 June 2000 in Lamphun and has one older sister.

He received a high vocational certificate in electrical technology at Lanna Polytechnic Chiang Mai Technological College. He graduated with a Bachelor of Communication Arts in Broadcasting and Streaming Media Production from Bangkok University in 2024.

== Career ==
Yim participated in the 7th edition of the To Be Number One Idol youth model contest, but did not advance in the competition. In 2018, he returned to compete the 8th edition and advanced to competed at the national level.

In 2022, Yim made his acting debut in the series Cutie Pie as Syn, a university student, classmate of the protagonist Kuea (Chawarin Perdpiriyawong) and romantic partner of Koraphat Lamnoi (Tutor). In 2023, Yim and Tutor reprised their roles in Naughty Babe and starred in The Middleman's Love.

Yim went on to star as Ob-un in the series Battle of the Writers (2024). In 2025, he played Thi in the series Zomvivor.

In June 2025, Domundi announced the formation of a six-member boy group named DEXX under DMD Music, consisting of James, Tutor, Yim, Auau, Por, and TeeTee. The group debuted with their first single "Clang Clang" on 24 June 2025.

== Discography ==
=== Singles ===
==== Soundtrack appearances ====
Year	Title	Album	Ref.
2024	"I Want to Keep You in My Eyes" (with Tutor)	Battle of the Writers OST	
2024	"Best to See You" (with Tutor)	Battle of the Writers OST	
2024	"How I Hide It"	Battle of the Writers OST	
2024	"I Want to Keep You in My Eyes" (Thai version) (with Tutor)	Battle of the Writers OST	
2026	"รักได้แล้ว (Next Status)" (with DEXX)	Duang with You OST	

== Filmography ==
=== Television series ===
Year	Title	Role	Network	Notes	Ref.
2022	Cutie Pie	"Syn" Sinsamoe	Workpoint TV	Supporting role	
2023	Bed Friend	Jade Jetaniphat	One 31, iQIYI	Supporting role	
2023	Naughty Babe	"Syn" Sinsamoe	One 31, iQIYI	Supporting role	
2023	The Middleman's Love	Jade Jetaniphat	One 31, iQIYI	Main role	
2024	Battle of the Writers	Ob-un	iQIYI	Main role	
2025	Zomvivor	Thi	Netflix	Supporting role	
2026	Duang With You	Funan	One 31, iQIYI	Supporting role	
2026	Love Upon a Time	High Lord Boribanpracha	Workpoint TV	Guest role (Ep. 8)	
2026	ChermChey	Akkhara	TrueVisions Now	Main role	
2026	The D Dorm	Dolly	One 31	Main role	
TBA	Restart			Supporting role	
TBA	The Scent of Sorrow	Wassa		Main role	
TBA	Zomvivor Chapter 2	Thi		Supporting role	
TBA	Friend Benefit			Supporting role	

=== Television show ===
Year	Title	Network	Notes
2016	High School Reunion	GMM25	Ep. 86 (11 September 2026)
2022	T-Pop Stage Show	Workpoint TV	Ep. 35 (30 April 2022)
2022	คู่มันส์ Fun Day	True Inside	23 October 2022
2023	คุณพระช่วย Khun Pra Chuay	Workpoint TV	23 July 2023
2023	หัวท้ายตายก่อน The First and Last Thailand	Workpoint TV	Ep. 79 (31 July 2023)
2023	4 ต่อ 4 Celebrity	One 31	Ep. 812 (10 September 2023)
2023	โตมาเป็น Grow Up to Be	One Playground	Ep. 1
2024	Sawatdee Khrap T-Boys!! 今、注目すべきタイのトップアーティストに密着	TV Tokyo, TVer	
2024	Who Is My Chef	Workpoint TV	Ep. 301 (13 December 2024)
2025	T-Pop Stage	Workpoint TV	26 June 2025
2025	Thailand Music Countdown	Channel 3	Ep. 12 (3 August 2025)
2025	รอบวัน Rop Wan	One 31	16 October 2025
2026	โตมาเป็น Grow Up to Be	Asok Montri	Ep. 24
2026	Who Is My Chef	Workpoint TV	Ep. 366 (13 March 2026)

=== Web series ===
Year	Title	Role	Notes	Ref.
2023	Our Winter		Main role	
2023	Crush on You		Main role	
2023	Jun & Jun		Cameo (Ep. 6)	
