= Rapheephong Thapsuwan =

Thai actor and model (born 1996)

- รพีพงศ์ ทับสุวรรณ
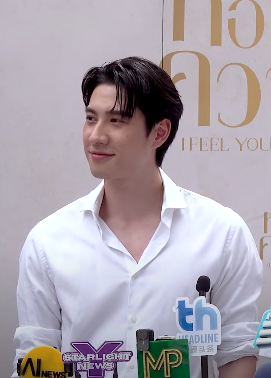
- Bright during promotion of I Feel You Linger in the Air
- Born: 11 May 1996 (age 30); Nakhon Ratchasima, Thailand
- Other name: Bright (ไบร์ท)
- Education: Thammasat University (Health Sciences, Sports Management)
- Occupations: Actor; model
- Years active: 2018–present
- Agents: Channel 3 (2018–2023); GMMTV (2025–present)
- Height: 1.80 m (5 ft 11 in)

Rapheephong Thapsuwan (Thai: รพีพงศ์ ทับสุวรรณ; born 11 May 1996), nicknamed Bright (Thai: ไบร์ท), is a Thai actor and model. He was a contracted actor for Channel 3 from 2018 to 2023 and currently works under GMMTV. He is known for his role as Khun Yai in the series I Feel You Linger in the Air (2023).

== Biography ==
Rapheephong was born on 11 May 1996 in Nakhon Ratchasima, Thailand. He is the eldest child, with one younger sister. He completed secondary school at Assumption College Nakhon Ratchasima and graduated from the Faculty of Health Sciences at Thammasat University with a bachelor's degree in Sports Management.

== Career ==
Bright began his acting career in 2018 with a supporting role in the drama Kham Si Thandar (ข้ามสีทันดร) on Channel 3. The same year, he joined Channel 3's "Supernova" project.

In 2021, he caught public attention by appearing in the music video for "It's Okay Not To Be Alright" by singer PP Krit.

His breakthrough role came in 2023 when he portrayed Khun Yai in the period BL series I Feel You Linger in the Air, alongside Chanon Santinatornkul (Nonkul). The series aired on One 31 and received positive responses from both audiences and critics.

In 2025, Bright signed a contract with GMMTV and was cast in two new series: Mu-Girl Miracle Matchmaking and The Fridge. He was also confirmed for the Channel 3 drama Pin Anong (ปิ่นอนงค์), scheduled for 2026.

== Filmography ==
=== Television series ===
Key
†	Denotes television productions that have not yet been released

Year	Title	Role	Network	Notes	Ref.
2018	Kham Si Thandar (ข้ามสีทันดร)	En	Channel 3	Supporting role	
2020	Trap Fah Mi Tawan (ตราบฟ้ามีตะวัน)	Bright	Channel 3	Guest role	
2021	Mia Jampen (เมียจำเป็น)	Suthee	Channel 3	Supporting role	
2022	Game Prattana	Sean	Channel 3	Supporting role	
2022	Buppha Roi Rai (บุพเพร้อยร้าย)	Tham / Thatch	Channel 3	Supporting role	
2023	Thi Sut Khong Hua Jai (ที่สุดของหัวใจ)	Tony	Channel 3	Supporting role	
2023	I Feel You Linger in the Air	Khun Yai	One 31	Main role	
2023	The Betrayal	Non	Channel 3	Supporting role	
2025	Mu-Girl Miracle Matchmaking	Pokpong	Mono 29	Main role	
2025	The Fridge	Makorn	Monomax	Main role	
2026	Pin Anong (ปิ่นอนงค์)	Panthep	Channel 3	Supporting role	
2026	Ticket to Heaven	Master Phak	GMM 25	Supporting role	
2026	You Maniac	Mes	GMM 25	Guest role	
2026	Lovers & Gangsters	"Zoe" Tawai Waen	One 31	Main role	
TBA	The Invisible Dragon †	Kimhan	TBA	Supporting role	
TBA	Stalemate †	Victor	TBA	Main role	

=== Film ===
Year	Title	Role	Notes	Ref.
2024	Exit	Ben	Main role	

== Discography ==
- "Fun Dee (Blissful Dream)" (ฝันดี) – I Feel You Linger in the Air OST (2023)

== Music video appearances ==
- "It's Okay Not To Be Alright" – PP Krit (2021)

== Live performances ==
- Channel 3 Super Fan Live! : SUPERNOVA – 23 August 2020
- Bright in Macau (fan meeting) – 10 December 2023

== Awards and nominations ==
Year	Award	Category	Result	Work
2024	Maya TV Awards 2024	Rising Male Star of the Year (ดาวรุ่งชายแห่งปี)	Nominated	—
