= Chalongrat Novsamrong =

Thai actor, model and singer (born 1998)

- ฉลองรัฐ นอบสำโรง
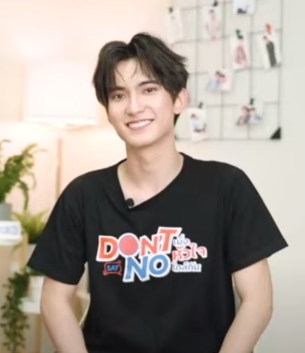
- Chalongrat in 2021
- Born: April 9, 1998 (age 28); Bangkok, Thailand
- Other name: First (เฟริสท์)
- Occupations: Actor; singer
- Years active: 2018–present
- Agent: The Terrace81 (2024–present)

Chalongrat Novsamrong (Thai: ฉลองรัฐ นอบสำโรง; born 9 April 1998), nicknamed First (Thai: เฟริสท์), is a Thai actor, and singer. He has appeared in the television series TharnType (2020), 2gether: The Series (2020), Don't Say No (2021) and Remember Me (2022).

== Career ==
First began acting in 2018 with the series Social Death Vote. The same year, he was a member of the group Cute Chef.

In 2020, he had supporting roles in 2gether: The Series as Chat and in TharnType as Fiat. In 2021, he reprised his role as Fiat in Don't Say No.

In 2024, First signed with the agency The Terrace81.

== Filmography ==
=== Television ===
Year	Title	Role	Notes	Network	Ref.
2018	Social Death Vote	Joe	Main role	Channel 28	
2020	2gether: The Series	Chat	Supporting role	GMM 25	
2020	TharnType 2: 7 Years of Love	Fiat	Supporting role	One 31	
2021	Don't Say No	Fiat	Main role	One 31, LINE TV	
2022	Remember Me	Gun	Main role	Channel 3	
2023	Be Mine, Superstar	Ashit	Main role	Channel 3	
2025	Reset	Ren	Supporting role	iQIYI	

=== Film ===
Year	Title	Role
2017	Ruk Tur Hai Noy Long	Boat
2024	Exit	Xiao

== Discography ==
Year	Title	Notes	Ref.
2021	"หัวใจใกล้เธอ" (Please Don't Say No) (with Ja Phachara)	Don't Say No OST	
2021	"ใกล้กัน" (Our Love) (with Ja Phachara, Smart Chisanupong, James Pongsapak)	Don't Say No OST	
2023	"แอบรัก" (First Love) (with Ja Phachara)	Be Mine, Superstar OST	
