= Love Like a Bike =

2026 Thai Boys' Love television series

- Also known as: Love Like a Bike
- ปั่นไปให้ถึงรัก
- Genre: Drama; Romance; Sports; Boys' Love
- Written by: Chim Sedthawut Inboon
- Directed by: Tanwarin Sukkhapisit
- Country of origin: Thailand
- Original language: Thai
- No. of seasons: 1
- No. of episodes: 8

Production
- Running time: 45 minutes
- Production companies: S-Class Entertainment, Channel 3

Original release
- Network: Channel 3; GagaOOLala
- Release: 2 March – 20 April 2026

Love Like a Bike (Thai: ปั่นไปให้ถึงรัก) is a Thai romantic drama television series with a Boys' Love (BL) theme, produced by Channel 3 in collaboration with S-Class Entertainment. The series premiered in March 2026 on Channel 3 and was made available internationally on GagaOOLala.

== Synopsis ==
Set in Pattaya, the story follows three adopted brothers who run a bicycle café together. Nub-Nueng, the eldest, is a calm and thoughtful psychologist. Tawan, the middle brother, is a former pilot still haunted by the trauma of a plane crash. Sky, the youngest, works as a nightclub host. Each brother faces unique challenges in love: Nub-Nueng meets Sailom, who struggles with androphobia; Tawan reconnects with Dindin, a past one-night stand; and Sky encounters Nava, a sharp-minded businessman. Through a transformative cycling journey, the brothers ride toward personal growth and the pursuit of happiness.

== Cast ==
=== Main ===
- Masu Junyangdikul as Nubnueng
- Tee Tanapol Jarujittranon as Sailom
- Ta Nannakun Pakapatpornpob as Dindin
- Us Nititorn Akkarachotsopon as Tawan
- Danny Luciano as Sky
- Win Thanat Wanattapong as Nava

=== Supporting ===
- Suchada Poonpattanasuk as Phailin
- Zoom Pankorn Chantasorn as Zoom
- Mickey Nathanon as Mickey

== Production ==
The series was announced in 2025 as part of Channel 3's BL lineup. MintMagTH highlighted the casting of Masu Junyangdikul and Tee Tanapol Jarujittranon as leads, noting the anticipation surrounding their on-screen chemistry.

Filming took place in Pattaya and Bangkok, incorporating urban and coastal settings into the narrative.

== Broadcast ==
Love Like a Bike aired from 2 March to 4 May 2026, with weekly episodes on Mondays. The series consists of 10 episodes of approximately 45 minutes each, broadcast on Channel 3 and distributed internationally via GagaOOLala.

== Reception ==
The series received extensive coverage in Thai media prior to its release. TrueID emphasized the romantic and sports elements of the storyline, while Thai Post discussed the cultural significance of portraying family and diversity.

Naewna published articles highlighting audience expectations and the relevance of the series within the contemporary BL landscape.

International outlets such as Aiigodoramas and GagaOOLala also covered the series, noting its appeal and the diversity of couples portrayed.
