= Magic Move =

2026 Thai television series

- ทำนายทายรัก
- Genre: Romance; Romantic comedy; Boys' love
- Directed by: Nob Sathanapong Limwongthong
- Starring: Ball Naphatsak Ekpattanaphiwat; Deam Wutthiphat Rungcharoenareechit; Shino Peraphat Dhanarattananont; Parn Thanaporn Wagprayoon; Sumet Ong; Milky Praiya Padungsuk; Intanont Non Boonchuen; Boss Chanakan Poonsiriwong
- Country of origin: Thailand
- Original language: Thai
- No. of seasons: 1

Production
- Producer: Wittawat Sangsakit
- Production company: Moonlight Glow

Original release
- Network: One31
- Release: 21 April 2026

Magic Move (Thai: ทำนายทายรัก) is a Thai television series in the romantic comedy and boys' love genres, starring Ball Naphatsak Ekpattanaphiwat and Deam Wutthiphat Rungcharoenareechit. The series premieres on 21 April 2026 on One31.

== Synopsis ==
Ritt (Ball Naphatsak) is an architecture student who accidentally starts working as a fortune teller at a friend's shop. His predictions become popular overnight. Itthi (Deam Wutthiphat), heir to a real estate business family, decides to test his skills and asks for help finding his "childhood friend," whom he doesn't remember. Ritt pretends to be that person, and a relationship begins from this lie. However, the real childhood friend returns, and Ritt must deal with the consequences of his deception.

== Cast ==
=== Main ===
- Ball Naphatsak Ekpattanaphiwat as Ritt
- Deam Wutthiphat Rungcharoenareechit as Itthi

=== Recurring ===
- Shino Peraphat Dhanarattananont
- Parn Thanaporn Wagprayoon
- Sumet Ong
- Milky Praiya Padungsuk
- Intanont Non Boonchuen
- Boss Chanakan Poonsiriwong

== Production ==
The series is produced by Moonlight Glow, and the director is Nob Sathanapong Limwongthong and the producer is Wittawat Sangsakit. The filming opening ceremony was held on 3 July 2025. The official pilot was released on 17 September 2025 on the Moonlight Glow YouTube channel. The official trailer was released on 26 February 2026 on the same channel.

== Broadcast ==
The series premieres on 21 April 2026, airing on One31.
