= Lovers & Gangsters =

2026-27 Thai television series

- Official series poster
- Thai: หงเสนคลุกฝุ่น
- Genre: Romantic Drama; Action
- Based on: Hong Sen Kao Yot (หงเสนเก้ายอด) and Seng Khluk Fun (เส็งคลุกฝุ่น) by rolisrose
- Screenplay by: Sakchai Kiatpanya-opas; Pornpitcha Boonbunjong
- Directed by: Gunyagorn Navarat
- Starring: Jiratchapong Srisang; Kasidet Plookphol; Sapol Assawamunkong; Rapheephong Thapsuwan
- Opening theme: "ใจโหด (Fearless)" by Khaotung Thanawat
- Ending theme: "บรรจบ (Reason of Seasons)" by Third Lapat
- Country of origin: Thailand
- Original language: Thai
- No. of episodes: 16

Production
- Executive producers: Sataporn Panichraksapong; Darapa Choeysanguan
- Producers: Noppharnach Chaiyahwimhon; Rabob Pokanngaen
- Cinematography: Phyungsak Naruepai
- Production companies: GMMTV; Cholumpi Production

Original release
- Network: One 31; OneD
- Release: 30 October 2026 – present

Lovers & Gangsters (Thai: หงเสนคลุกฝุ่น; RTGS: Hong Sen Khluk Fun) is a 2026–2027 Thai boys' love television series starring Jiratchapong Srisang (Force), Kasidet Plookphol (Book), Sapol Assawamunkong (Great) and Rapheephong Thapsuwan (Bright) adapted from the novels Hong Sen Kao Yot (Thai: หงเสนเก้ายอด) and Seng Khluk Fun (Thai: เส็งคลุกฝุ่น) by rolisrose.

Directed by Gunyagorn Navarat and produced by GMMTV and Cholumpi Brothers, the series was announced during the GMMTV 2026: Magic Vibes Maximized event on 25 November 2025.

The series premiered on One 31 and OneD on 30 October 2026, airing on Fridays at 20:30 ICT and 21:30 ICT, respectively.

== Synopsis ==
In 1956, Hongsen (Jiratchapong Srisang) the leader of the Gaoyod Gang controlling the Thonburi area, and Zeng (Sapol Assawamunkong) the leader of the Klookfoon Gang controlling the Phra Nakhon area, clash in a fierce battle stemming from an unresolved past feud. But admist the constant threat of conflict, love blossoms between Sen and Yong (Kasidet Plookphol) - Zeng's younger brother, and Zeng and Zoe (Rapheephong Thapsuwan), the newest member of the Klookfoon Gang. As love, revenge and secrets from the past become entangled, the four must confront danger and truths that could change their lives forever.

== Cast and characters ==
=== Main ===
- Jiratchapong Srisang (Force) as Hongsen Gaoyod (Sen)
- Kasidet Plookphol (Book) as Yongyi (Yong)
- Sapol Assawamunkong (Great) as Zeng Klookfoon
- Rapheephong Thapsuwan (Bright) as Tawai Waen (Zoe)

=== Supporting ===
- Natarit Worakornlertsith (Marc) as Din
- Teepakron Kwanboon (Prom) as Den
- Tanutchai Wijitvongtong (Mond) as Tot
- Kanyarat Ruangrung (Piploy) as Kradat
- Wayne Falconer as Inspector Yod
- Pornnapa Thepthinnakorn (Sui) as Wilai

== Original soundtrack ==
The official soundtrack for Lovers & Gangsters features:

Song	Artist(s)	Label	Ref.
"ใจโหด (Fearless)"	Khaotung Thanawat	GMMTV Records	
"บรรจบ (Reason of Seasons)"	Third Lapat	GMMTV Records	

== Fan meetings ==
Year	Title	Date	Venue	Ref.
2026	Lovers & Gangsters: The Legend Begins	30 October 2026	Union Hall, Union Mall	
