= Love Destiny (2026 TV series) =

2026 Thai television series

- Thai: บุพเพสันนิวาส
- Genre: Romantic drama; Fantasy
- Based on: บุพเพสันนิวาส (Love Destiny) by Rompaeng
- Screenplay by: Natpaphat Phanphoemsiri
- Directed by: Phawat Panangkasiri
- Starring: Vachiravit Paisarnkulwong; Thanaphon U-sinsap
- Opening theme: "โอ้...หัวใจ (Oh...My Heart)"
- Ending theme: "ทำทรง (Acting Cool)"
- Composers: Wutticha Kuanium; Narongsak Sribandasakwatcharakorn
- Country of origin: Thailand
- Original language: Thai
- No. of episodes: 10

Production
- Executive producer: Palatpol Mingpornpichit
- Producer: Tatchapong Supasri
- Cinematography: Pichet Talao
- Production company: Century UU Thailand

Original release
- Network: Channel 3 HD; IQIYI
- Release: 14 July – 15 September 2026

Related
- Love Destiny (2018)

Love Destiny (Thai: บุพเพสันนิวาส) is a Thai boys' love television series starring Vachiravit Paisarnkulwong (August) and Thanaphon U-sinsap (Leng). The series premiered on 14 July, 2026 and aired every Tuesday from 22:30 (ICT) on Channel 3, with an uncut version premiering on the streaming platform IQIYI at 23:00 the same day.

It is a remake of the 2018 series Love Destiny, which was a major success in Thailand. This version reimagines the story with a male-male lead couple, directed by Phawat Panangkasiri who helmed the original series and produced by Century UU Thailand.

== Synopsis ==
Great (Thanaphon U-sinsap), a young surgeon, has never felt the desire to love anyone and feels an emptiness in his life. He decides to resign from the hospital in search of the meaning of life, only to suffer an accident that sends his soul back to the reign of King Narai of Ayutthaya, into the body of Phor Gaew, a reckless troublemaker hated by everyone — especially Phor Dech (Vachiravit Paisarnkulwong), his former fellow disciple. Great, now in Gaew's body, tries to find a way back to the present. But when he fails, he restores his reputation. From a notorious troublemaker, he becomes a new man who uses modern knowledge — medicine, cooking, combat skills, and history — to help the people of Ayutthaya. Gradually, Dech begins to see a side of Gaew he never knew, and the feelings between them slowly begin to change.

== Cast ==
=== Main ===
- Vachiravit Paisarnkulwong (August) as Sunthorn Thewa (Dech)
- Thanaphon U-sinsap (Leng) as Gaew / Great

=== Supporting ===
- Naphat Vikairungroj (Na) as Reung / Reungrich (Rit)
- Tanapon Aukavongseree (Vin) as Wad / Wayu (Yu)
- Thunyatorn Viwatdecha (Thun) as Pin
- Chintub Duangkaew (Fay) as Yam
- Toni Rakkaen as the Fortune Teller
- Jaturong Mokjok as Okya-Horathibodi (Hore)
- Kwantip Devakula (Pom) as Jumpa Thewa
- Varitthisa Limthammahisorn (Thisa) as Thao Sri Chulalak
- Panuwat Premmaneenan (Ice) as Sriprach Thewa (Sri)
- Anna Sueangam-iam as Thao Thong Kip Ma / Maria Guyomar de Pinha (Mali)
- Luke Ishikawa Plowden as Chao Phraya Wichayen / Constantine Phaulkon
- Natsakan Chairote (Gunner) as Prince Chao Fa Noi
- Mawin Taweepol (Win) as King Narai
- Chao Phraya Kosathibodi (Kao) as Juang
- Nonthiya Jewbangpa (Jeab) as Prik

=== Guest ===
- Piyamas Monayakol (Pu) as Nualsipang (Ep. 1, 6–7, 10)
- Phornloet Phiphatrungrueang (X) as Chao Phraya Srithammasokkaraj
- Daweerit Chullasapya (Pae) as Chao Phraya Kosathibodi (Parn)
- Chuerchart Wongsawat (New) as Chao Phraya Kosathibodi (Lek)

== Original soundtrack ==
The official soundtrack for Love Destiny features:

Song	Artist(s)	Label	Ref.
"โอ้...หัวใจ (Oh...My Heart)"	August Vachiravit	CUU Entertainment	
"ทำทรง (Acting Cool)"	August Vachiravit, Na Naphat, Thun Thunyatorn and Vin Tanapon	CUU Entertainment	
"有你的烟火 (Destiny Sparks)"	August Vachiravit and Leng Thanaphon	CUU Entertainment	

== Production ==
The series was announced in September 2025, when Century UU Thailand revealed it had acquired the rights from Rompaeng to produce a BL version. The announcement generated significant discussion on social media, with fans divided between excitement and concern that the original version might be "disrespected".
