= Lost to Light =

2026 Thai television series

- Official poster
- Genre: Drama, Romantic comedy, Music, Boy Love
- Created by: Ultimate Troop
- Written by: Zaanook Jukkroww Nipitpon Muangsinun
- Directed by: Tonnam Piamchon Damrongsunthornchai
- Starring: Dome Phemadech Vattanapati; Folk Ratchanon Khajitpornphun; Aomstin Thakrit Patthanaworakit; Ford Prosan Chaivirach
- Country of origin: Thailand
- Original language: Thai
- No. of episodes: 5

Production
- Running time: 62 minutes
- Production company: Ultimate Troop

Original release
- Network: GMM 25, iQIYI
- Release: June 20 – July 18, 2026

Lost to Light (Thai: อยากจะดังหรือยังนะ; lit.) is a 2026 Thai drama, romantic comedy, musical and Boy Love television series. Written by Zaanook Jukkroww Nipitpon Muangsinun, directed by Tonnam Piamchon Damrongsunthornchai, and produced by Ultimate Troop, it stars Phemadech Vattanapati (Dome), Ratchanon Khajitpornphun (Folk), Aomstin Thakrit Patthanaworakit and Ford Prosan Chaivirach.

The series premiered on 20 June 2026 on GMM25, airing every Saturday. An uncut version was released on iQIYI, while the edited version became available on Ultimate Troop's official YouTube channel.

== Synopsis ==
Jeng tries to save his T-POP group by recruiting new members to replace those who left the band. Among them is Mai, a guitarist hiding his true identity and a secret mission.

At the same time, Sithian, the owner of the record label, reunites with his former boyfriend, Bailiu, while everyone faces the challenges of the music industry and pursues their dreams.

== Cast ==
=== Main ===
- Phemadech Vattanapati (Dome) as Jeng
- Ratchanon Khajitpornphun (Folk) as Mai
- Thakrit Patthanaworakit (Aomstin) as Boss Sithian
- Prosan Chaivirach (Ford) as Bailiu

=== Recurring ===
- Madaew Apichet Atilattana
- Alie Blackcobra
- Phiravich Attachitsataporn (Mean)
- Winner Vorasorn Wannaworasate
- B-Bas Warut Lomsawad
- Garto Pannawit Phattanasiri
- Bookko Thanatchaphan Buranachiwawilai
- Uno Laothong
- Waii Panthisa Thienprasit
- Gunsmile Chanagun Arpornsutinan

=== Special appearance ===
- Tonnam Piamchon Damrongsunthornchai

== Soundtrack ==
No.	Title	Artist	Length
1.	"Fan Content (แฟน Content)"	Offroad Kantapon

== Production ==
The project was announced by Ultimate Troop in February 2026 as part of the company's annual slate. The series combines Boy Love with the T-POP industry, exploring themes of friendship, fame, music, and personal growth.

It was directed by Tonnam Piamchon Damrongsunthornchai and written by Zaanook Jukkroww Nipitpon Muangsinun. The production features a cast of newcomer actors led by Dome Phemadech Vattanapati and Folk Ratchanon Khajitpornphun.

The official trailer was released on 5 June 2026 through Ultimate Troop's YouTube channel. Ahead of the premiere, the cast participated in interviews and promotional activities to introduce the series and its characters. According to the producers, the series was created to portray the challenges faced by aspiring artists in the T-POP industry, with music serving as a central element of the story. Prior to its premiere, the series was promoted by KAZZ Magazine, which described it as a romantic comedy set in the world of T-POP.
