= ChermChey =

2026 Thai television series

- Official series poster
- Thai: เฉิ่มเชย
- Genre: Romantic drama; Romantic comedy; Boys' love
- Based on: Chermchey by Nottakorn
- Directed by: Thanamin Wongskulphat
- Starring: Koraphat Lamnoi; Prarinyakorn Kansawa
- Country of origin: Thailand
- Original language: Thai
- No. of episodes: 10

Production
- Cinematography: Picharn Wimolchaiyaporn
- Running time: 44–52 minutes
- Production companies: Copy A Bangkok; Domundi TV

Original release
- Network: TrueVisions Now; GagaOOLala
- Release: 19 May – 14 July 2026

ChermChey (Thai: เฉิ่มเชย; RTGS: Choem Choei, lit. 'Corny Old') is a 2026 Thai romantic drama boys' love television series, starring Koraphat Lamnoi (Tutor) and Prarinyakorn Kansawa (Yim). Directed by Thanamin Wongskulphat (Cheewin) and produced by Copy A Bangkok in partnership with Domundi TV.

The series premiered on TrueVisions Now on 19 May 2026, airing on Tuesdays at 20:00 ICT.

== Synopsis ==
The story follows Erng (Prarinyakorn Kansawa), a young bar owner whose life falls apart after he discovers his partner's betrayal. Both his relationship and the business he built crumble in a single night. Seeking to heal his wounds and start over, he travels to Taiwan. During his journey, he meets Intha (Koraphat Lamnoi), a seemingly calm and wise man who hides a unique personality. Their chance encounter turns into a deep friendship that gradually develops into something more. As they grow closer, Erng must decide if he is willing to trust love again.

== Cast ==
=== Main ===
- Koraphat Lamnoi (Tutor) as Intha
- Prarinyakorn Kansawa (Yim) as Akara (Erng)

=== Supporting ===
- Phasakorn Ratnaliam (Mac) as Bomb
- Chintub Duangkaew (Fay) as A-Ten
- Peerada Namwong (Paper) as Nok
- Harit Buayoi (Keng) as Master
- Karn Kritsanaphan (Jimmy) as Aiyaret
- Thanakrit Chiamchunya (Ohm) as Chen Nai
- Kornthas Rujeerattanavorapan (Max) as Lalit
- Natasit Uareksit (Nat) as Nine
- Thanaphum Sestasittikul (Auau) as Tonhon
- Worapong Walor (Save) as Chonlatee
- Sorntast Buangam (Mark) as Araya
- Krittapod Bunyamanee (Leon) as Issara

== Production ==
The series was announced at the Copy A Bangkok Line Up 2026 event in February 2026. The series was made in partnership with Domundi TV, starring Koraphat Lamnoi (Tutor) and Prarinyakorn Kansawa (Yim).

== Marketing ==
The series was promoted with the ChermChey Grand Opening premiere screening event held at Lido Connect Hall 2 on 19 May 2026.

== Awards and nominations ==
Award nominations for ChermChey
Year	Award	Category	Nominee(s)	Result	Ref.
2026	The Viral Hits Love Moment Awards 2026	Most Popular BL Supporting Duo (People's Choice Award)	Thanaphum Sestasittikul and Worapong Walor	Won	
