= Don't Say No (TV series) =

2021 Thai television series

- Thai: เมื่อหัวใจใกล้กัน
- Literally: Don't Say No
- Genre: Boys' love; Romantic drama
- Written by: Ornwan Vichyawankul
- Directed by: Passawut Sukbua
- Starring: Phachara Suansri; Chalongrat Novsamrong; Chisanupong Paungmanee; Pongsapak Rachaporn
- Country of origin: Thailand
- Original language: Thai
- No. of episodes: 12

Production
- Running time: 50 minutes
- Production company: Me Mind Y

Original release
- Network: One 31; LINE TV
- Release: 6 August – 22 October 2021

Don't Say No (Thai: เมื่อหัวใจใกล้กัน) is a Thai boys' love (BL) television series produced by Me Mind Y. It stars Phachara Suansri (Ja) and Chalongrat Novsamrong (First), with direction by Passawut Sukbua (Pique) and screenplay by Ornwan Vichyawankul (May) .

The series aired from 6 August to 22 October 2021, with weekly episodes on Fridays on One 31 and available for replay on LINE TV.

== Synopsis ==
Leo (Ja) and Fiat (First) have been close friends since childhood. After more than ten years, they decide to begin a romantic relationship.

As they transition from friendship to a relationship, both struggle to adjust to the change in their dynamic. Leo becomes more reserved, while Fiat reacts with uncertainty, particularly in moments of physical closeness. Complications arise when people from Fiat's past reappear, leading to tension between the two.

== Cast and characters ==
=== Main ===
- Phachara Suansri (Ja) as Leo
- Chalongrat Novsamrong (First) as Fiat

=== Supporting ===
- Chisanupong Paungmanee (Smart) as Leon (Leo's brother)
- Pongsapak Rachaporn (James) as Pob
- Supakit Wilasmongkolchai (Chai) as Aek
- Supakorn Wilasmongkolchai (Seng) as Tho
- Putthanat Chayaaphinanthakul (Puth) as Plainam
- Phunthida Phairuangkij (Beam) as Natsu
- Sirinya Puengsuwan (Rin) as Anda
- Thanakorn Sangwan (Ole) as Rick
- Nattawut Praphapensuk (Earth) as Third
- Daniel Alex Bird as Varun
- Parlika Mongkonlirwrungfa (Earth) as Punn
- Jakkarin Yungnun (Natt) as King

=== Guest ===
- Natcha Somboonwong (Sound) as Nina
- Charoenchai Khantichaikhajohn (Strong) as Chika
- Sittawasilp Kabilchonlathit (Ofah) as young Fiat
- Songsit Rungnopakunsi (Kob) as Korn (Leo's father)
- Sarut Vichitrananda (Big) as Mait (Fiat's father)
- Sueangsuda Lawanprasert (Namfon) as Leo's mother
- Pumwaree Yodkamol (Air) as Fiat's stepmother

== Production ==
The series was produced by Me Mind Y, the same company behind TharnType the Series. The screenplay was written by MAME, who also wrote Love by Chance and TharnType.

Filming took place in 2021 and concluded in October of the same year.

The series ranked among the most-watched titles on LINE TV during its broadcast period.

== Release ==
The series premiered on 6 August 2021, airing on One 31 on Fridays at 10:45 p.m. (local time). Episodes were made available for replay on LINE TV later the same day.

The series was also distributed internationally on Viki, iQIYI and WeTV.

== Reception ==
The series performed strongly on LINE TV, where it ranked highly during several weeks of its broadcast.

Media coverage highlighted the on-screen chemistry between Ja and First, particularly in relation to the portrayal of the central relationship.
