= Fool In Love (Thai TV series) =

2026 Thai television series

- Official poster
- Thai: คนโง่รักเข(ล)า
- Genre: Drama; Boys' love
- Based on: 你却爱着一个他 by Shui Qiancheng
- Directed by: Stacy Baek
- Starring: Bank Artit Tangwiboonpanit; Copter Nuntapong Wongsakulyong
- Country of origin: Thailand
- Original language: Thai
- No. of episodes: 20

Production
- Production companies: iQIYI; Tailai Entertainment

Original release
- Network: iQIYI

Fool in Love (Thai: คนโง่รักเข(ล)า) is a 2026 Thai Boys' love television series produced as an original production by iQIYI in collaboration with Tailai Entertainment.

The series is based on the Chinese novel 你却爱着一个他 by Shui Qiancheng and follows the relationship between Ing (Bank Artit Tangwiboonpanit) and Yok (Copter Nuntapong Wongsakulyong). The series is scheduled to premiere on iQIYI on 8 October 2026, with a total of 20 episodes.

== Synopsis ==
The story follows Ing, a young man who becomes interested in Yok, the second son of a wealthy family. Yok is a friend of Ing's half-brother, with whom he has a troubled relationship. Determined to win Yok over, Ing approaches him without realising that his feelings are part of a scheme involving a family dispute and interests surrounding the family's fortune.

== Cast ==
=== Main ===
- Bank Artit Tangwiboonpanit as Ing
- Copter Nuntapong Wongsakulyong as Yok

=== Supporting ===
- Guy Wasu Srimook as Itt
- Jaosua Sarin Suraprasert as Singha
- Tan Buranrat Hombut as Phet
- Bank Mondop Heamtan as Leo
- Bonus Nutthawut Eamchuen as Pite

== Production ==
The series is an original production by iQIYI, produced in collaboration with Tailai Entertainment. The project marks the first collaboration between actors Bank Artit Tangwiboonpanit and Copter Nuntapong Wongsakulyong.

The series is adapted from the Chinese novel 你却爱着一个他 by Shui Qiancheng, which was published in Thai under the title คนโง่ที่ไม่เคยมีรัก. The production was presented as part of the literary universe known as the 188 Group.

The first teaser was released in August 2026, ahead of the series' premiere. The official trailer was released on 25 September 2026 on YouTube.
