= Teach Me, Touch Me =

- Official poster
- สัมผัสกันต์ธีร์
- Genre: Romance; Drama; Boys' love (BL)
- Based on: Teach Me Touch Me
- Written by: Jo Natchawan Chaithum
- Directed by: Golf Tanwarin Sukkhapisit
- Starring: Chalarm Siam Pipatcharoenwong as Kanthi; James Pongsapak Rachaporn as Gear; Non Ratchanon Kanpiang as Nu; Joke Chaloemdet Thammawut as Jay; Fort Thitipong Sangngey as Big Boss; Peat Wasuthorn Chaijindar as Chin
- Country of origin: Thailand
- Original language: Thai
- No. of seasons: 1
- No. of episodes: 10

Production
- Running time: 57 minutes

Original release
- Network: iQIYI
- Release: October 14, 2026 – present

Teach Me, Touch Me (Thai: สัมผัสกันต์ธีร์) is a 2026 Thai television series in the genres of romance, drama, and boys' love (BL), directed by Golf Tanwarin Sukkhapisit and starring Chalarm Siam Pipatcharoenwong and James Pongsapak Rachaporn. The series is produced by AB Group Entertainment and distributed by the iQIYI streaming platform. The series also features the on-screen couple Fort Thitipong Sangngey and Peat Wasuthorn Chaijindar in guest appearances.

== Synopsis ==
After ending his relationship, Gear, a university student, approaches Kanthi, a wealthy 34-year-old man, to learn about intimacy. Initially reluctant, Kanthi eventually agrees to Gear's request in exchange for three favors that Gear will not be allowed to refuse.

== Cast ==
=== Main ===
- Chalarm Siam Pipatcharoenwong as Kanthi
- James Pongsapak Rachaporn as Gear
- Ratchanon Kanpiang (Non) as Nu
- Chaloemdet Thammawut (Joke) as Jay

=== Supporting ===
- Tong Samitpong Sakulpongchai as Khim, Gear's ex-boyfriend
- Fort Thitipong Sangngey as Big Boss
- Peat Wasuthorn Chaijindar as Chin
- Teepor Krit Srisukwattananan as Pond
- Tack Phongsakorn Sukiang as Posh
- Bom Thunpisit Larpsumritphon as Bank
- Sunbites Natavish Ngamchawiwatthanasakul as Zee

=== Other cast members ===
- Gift Praweenpatch Sukhaphisit
- Tutun Ratchaarpaake Tunsiriwanlobp
- Kino Kaninnach Yompadcha
- Premier Parinphop Pahoul

== Production ==
The adaptation of Teach Me Touch Me was announced in November 2023, when details about the cast, episode count, and premiere date had not yet been disclosed. The project was subsequently developed by AB Group Entertainment in collaboration with iQIYI. Golf Tanwarin Sukkhapisit served as the director.

The pilot trailer, titled Teach Me Touch Me The Series [Official Pilot Trailer], was released on YouTube on 6 July 2025. By October 2026, the video had accumulated approximately 1.7 million views.

The official trailer was released on YouTube on 13 October 2026, ahead of the series premiere.

== Release ==
Teach Me, Touch Me premiered on 14 October 2026 on the iQIYI platform, which offers the uncut version of the series. New episodes are released on Wednesdays at 8:00 p.m. Thailand time.

The first season consists of ten episodes, each approximately 57 minutes long. The series is scheduled to conclude on 16 December 2026.
