= Oops! Mysterious Sounds =

2026 Thai television series

- Official series poster
- Thai: สืบเสียงปริศนา...อุ๊ย! เสียงหัวใจเธอดังกว่า
- Genre: Boys' love; Romantic drama; Mystery; Fantasy
- Based on: สืบจากเสียง Mysterious Sounds by Karnsaii
- Screenplay by: Kirati Kumsat; Thanaporn Phetcharas
- Directed by: Saroj Kunatanad
- Starring: Patarachai Kimanonth; Thanthai Boekprakhon
- Opening theme: "The Feeling We Don't Name" by D.O.T. House
- Country of origin: Thailand
- Original language: Thai
- No. of episodes: 10

Production
- Executive producers: Kanyaluck Milintachinda; Chanuttarm Thananunbhadej
- Producer: Penluck Ruangrabeab
- Cinematography: Pavarisa Tadee; Inphapa Pinprapa
- Running time: 48–52 minutes
- Production company: D.O.T. House

Original release
- Network: Workpoint TV; iQIYI
- Release: 18 September – 20 November 2026

Oops! Mysterious Sounds (Thai: สืบเสียงปริศนา...อุ๊ย! เสียงหัวใจเธอดังกว่า; RTGS: Suep Siang Pritsana...Ui! Siang Huachai Thoe Dang Kwa, lit. 'Investigate Mysterious Sound[s]... Oops! Sound of Your Heart is Louder') is a 2026 Thai boys' love television series, starring Patarachai Kimanonth (PK) and Thanthai Boekprakhon (Namna), based on the novel สืบจากเสียง Mysterious Sounds by Karnsaii. The series was directed by Saroj Kunatanad (Ark) and produced by D.O.T. House.

The series premiered on 18 September 2026 on Workpoint TV, airing on Fridays at 21:30 ICT. The uncut version was made available for streaming on iQIYI. The series concluded on 20 November 2026.

== Synopsis ==
The story follows Podduang (Patarachai Kimanonth) and Jinna (Thanthai Boekprakhon), two rivals who end up pretending to be a couple. After the mysterious death of an idol friend, they become involved in an investigation that leads them to supernatural secrets. A pair of earphones appears to have an unexplained connection to the dead, while their search for answers brings the two closer and puts them in danger.

== Cast and characters ==
=== Main ===
- Thanthai Boekprakhon (Namna) as Jinna Ronnarak
- Patarachai Kimanonth (PK) as Podduang
- Punyaphat Punyatham (Paul) as Anda
- Pufah Amornchatchawankul (Pufresh) as Dunk
- Viracha Thapanangkoonkorn (Fang) as Bumm
- Chayatorn Suwanpichaisi (Shin-ai) as Art
- Thanathat Kuangthung (Nes) as Tod
- Chanya Thitisakyothin (Milk) as Amp
- Sofia Valencia as Risa

=== Supporting ===
- Kanin Stanley (Ohm) as Itti
- Sathaporn Nakvilairote (Tha) as Anda's father
- Nicole Theriault (Nikki) as Anda's mother
- Sukol Sasijulaka (Jome) as Jinna's father
- Naphat Chalomephornphakdee (Inntouch) as James
- Jira Danbawornkiat (Fluke) as Kum
- Thanakrit Chantasombut as Satang (Podduang's brother)
- Supalerk Phaetwong as Pong
- Kumron Jivachat as Chok
- Nantawat Palakawongs Na Ayudhya (Earth) as Coach Kong

=== Guest ===
- Woody Milintachinda as himself (Ep. 2)

== Soundtrack ==
Oops! Mysterious Sounds Soundtrack
No.	Title	Writer(s)	Artist	Length
1.	"The Feeling We Don't Name"	Tunwa Ketsuwan (Hye); Chayapat Thongsri (Toro)	PK; Namna; Paul; Pufresh; Fang; Shin-ai; Nes; Milk; Sofia; (D.O.T. House)	3:06
2.	"Sudden Love (ชอบเฉย)"	Jin Jidapa	PK Pata; Namna Thanthai	3:11
3.	"Worth It All (ขอบคุณที่เราได้พบกัน)"	Peerapon Iamjamrat (Three Man Down)	Paul Punyaphat; PK Pata; Fang Viracha	4:01

== Production ==
Oops! Mysterious Sounds is based on the novel สืบจากเสียง Mysterious Sounds and is produced by D.O.T. House.

The project was initially promoted through an official pilot, followed by the release of images featuring the nine cast members during preparation and fitting sessions. In August 2026, D.O.T. House released behind-the-scenes images from filming and confirmed the series' September release.

The series combines romance with mystery and supernatural fantasy, centering on an investigation involving mysterious sounds and events surrounding the characters.
