= Love Upon a Time =

2026 Thai television series

- Official series poster
- Thai: ภพเธอ
- Genre: Boys' love; Historical drama; Romantic drama
- Based on: Love Upon a Time by Littlebbear96
- Written by: Piangpaitoon Satrawaha; Porndee Satrawaha
- Directed by: Panuwat Inthawat
- Starring: Siraphop Manithikhun; Radchapon Phornpinit
- Ending theme: "Fated (ภพเธอ)" by FirstOne (Ep. 1–2); "Still You (แค่เธอตรงนี้)" by JJ Radchapon (Ep. 3); "Everlasting Dreams (ฝากฝันชั่วกาล)" by Ice Sarunyu (Ep. 4); "Within (คำคะนึง)" by Net Siraphop (Ep. 5); "Still (ปักใจ)" by NuNew (Ep. 6, 8); "Daydream (ดั่งใจฝัน)" by Bowkylion (Ep. 7); "Before Tomorrow (ถ้าพรุ่งนี้ไม่มีเธอ)" by JJ Radchapon (Ep. 9); "No More Hiding (ยอมรับหัวใจ)" by Kim Pongsaton (Ep. 10); "Moon and Night (จันทร์ราตรี)" by Risa Narisa (Ep. 11); "The Love I Found (รักที่เป็นเธอ)" by Net Siraphop, JJ Radchapon (Ep. 12)
- Country of origin: Thailand
- Original language: Thai
- No. of episodes: 12

Production
- Executive producer: Kittipat Champa
- Producer: Kornkanok Rangsimontakul
- Cinematography: Sarawut Chuparkpanich; Khanit Deepuang; Panpode Boonprasert; Nattapong Leartponrat
- Running time: 48–88 minutes
- Production company: Domundi TV

Original release
- Network: Workpoint TV; iQIYI
- Release: 27 March – 12 June 2026

Love Upon a Time (Thai: ภพเธอ; RTGS: Phop Thoe) is a 2026 Thai boys' love television series, starring Siraphop Manithikhun (Net) and Radchapon Phornpinit (JJ), based on the novel of the same name by Littlebbear96. The series was produced by Domundi TV and Mandee Work.

The series premiered on Workpoint TV on 27 March 2026, airing on Fridays at 21:30 ICT. The uncut version was made available for streaming at 22:30 ICT on iQIYI. The series concluded on 12 June 2026.

== Synopsis ==
Nakun (Radchapon Phornpinit), a twenty-year-old student skeptical of superstitions, is unexpectedly transported back nearly four centuries to the Ayutthaya Kingdom. Mistaken for a missing young man named Klao, he assumes Klao's identity to uncover the mystery of his disappearance while searching for a way home. Meanwhile, Klao's friend Phop (Siraphop Manithikhun) doubts Nakun's true identity and keeps a close watch on him, unconvinced that he is the younger brother he once knew.

== Cast ==
=== Main ===
- Siraphop Manithikhun (Net) as Phop (past) / Tinnaphop (present)
- Radchapon Phornpinit (JJ) as Klao (past) / Nakun Phattanatada (present)
- Thanutchon Chankaewarmorn (Latte) as Jom (past) / Thee (present)
- Pongsaton Sittipan (Kim) as Kaew (past) / Pun (present)

=== Supporting ===
- Poothanate Hongmanop (Captain) as Preechapiban (Phop's father)
- Sueangsuda Lawanprasert (Namfon) as Prayong
- Athiwad Sanidwong Na Ayoodthayaa (Ton) as High Lord Pichayabhakdi
- Chatchawit Techarukpong (Victor) as Harn
- Sadanont Durongkavarojana (Nont) as Cherd
- Jirawat Vongdilokvath (Mai) as Fortune Teller Rattikarn
- Pariya Wongrabieb (Mam) as Muan
- Piamchon Damrongsunthornchai (Tonnam) as Chuay
- Akarathi Phichaphiromphinyo (Moz) as Khong
- Manussita Jarusasi (March) as Sai
- Malimarisar Hughes (Justmine) as Pim
- Jidapa Phonrojpanya (Tontoei) as Varna
- Suttida Kasemsan Na Ayutthaya (Nook) as Nahathai (Nakun's mother)
- Worarat Karnjanarach (Kapom) as But
- Pijika Jittaputta (Lookwa) as Sopha
- Jaturong Phonboon as Meng
- Jassada Janmano (Gems) as A-Chai
- Phuriwat Chotiratanasak (Copper) as Kla

=== Guest ===
- Koraphat Lamnoi (Tutor) as Roong (Ep. 8)
- Prarinyakorn Kansawa (Yim) as High Lord Boribanpracha (Ep. 8)

== Soundtrack ==
No.	Title	Writer(s)	Artist	Length
1.	"Fated (ภพเธอ)"	Pure Kanin; Jeaniich	FirstOne	4:11
2.	"Still You (แค่เธอตรงนี้)"	Watan-U; Nuttorn Intorachit	JJ Radchapon	3:50
3.	"Everlasting Dreams (ฝากฝันชั่วกาล)"	Watan-U	Ice Sarunyu	4:40
4.	"Within (คำคะนึง)"	Pure Kanin; Jeaniich	Net Siraphop	4:01
5.	"Still (ปักใจ)"	Amp Achariya Dulyapaiboon	NuNew	3:31
6.	"Daydream (ดั่งใจฝัน)"	Bowkylion	Bowkylion	4:17
7.	"No More Hiding (ยอมรับหัวใจ)"	Chestha Yarosake	Kim Pongsaton	5:04
8.	"Won (วอน)" (Original by The Peach Band)	Rakphol Rakkhanam; Wiriyapa Chansuwong	Monica	4:09
9.	"Moon and Night (จันทร์ราตรี)"	Amp Achariya Dulyapaiboon	Risa Narisa	3:16
10.	"Before Tomorrow (ถ้าพรุ่งนี้ไม่มีเธอ)"	Amp Achariya Dulyapaiboon	JJ Radchapon	3:47
11.	"Until We Meet"	Amp Achariya Dulyapaiboon	Justmine (JMNK)	3:03
12.	"The Love I Found (รักที่เป็นเธอ)"	Watan-U	Net Siraphop; JJ Radchapon	4:25

== Production ==
The production of Love Upon a Time was announced on 13 December 2022 as part of Domundi's 2023 line-up, starring Siraphop Manithikhun (Net) and Supamongkon Wongwisut (Jamessu). In March 2024, Jamessu exited the project to focus on his career as a singer, being replaced by JJ Radchapon Phornpinit in May.

A propitious ceremony to bless the production was held on 13 June 2025 at the Ganesha shrine in Bangkok. Costume fitting was publicly released in June 2025 ahead of filming. To prepare for their roles, the cast had to attend workshops to practice the language used in the past. Principal photography started on 25 June 2025 and ended on 27 February 2026. In November 2025, filming was delayed due to heavy rains and floods in Thailand which damaged the main set, pushing the premiere from late 2025 to the late first quarter of 2026.

The pilot episode was released on 20 February 2025, while the official trailer was released on 6 March 2026.

== Marketing ==
The series was promoted with the Love Upon a Time Ep. 1 press conference and premiere screening event held at MCC Hall, The Mall Lifestore Bangkapi on 27 March 2026. Love Upon a Time busking event was then held at Siam Square Block K on 26 April 2026. The final episode was promoted with the Love Upon a Time Series Final Ep. screening event held at MGI Hall, Bravo BKK on 12 June 2026.

== Awards and nominations ==
Award nominations for Love Upon a Time
Year	Award	Category	Nominee(s)	Result	Ref.
2026	Pattaya International Film Festival 2026	Outstanding Rising BL Actor	Siraphop Manithikhun and Radchapon Phornpinit	Won	
2026	The Viral Hits Thailand Spotlight Awards 2026	Best Trending On-Screen Couple	Siraphop Manithikhun and Radchapon Phornpinit	Won	
2026	Howe Awards 2026	Outstanding Script of the Year	Love Upon a Time	Won	
2027	Kazz Awards 2027	Youth Choice of the Year	Radchapon Phornpinit (4th place)	Won	
