= Playboyy =

2023 Thai Boys' Love television series

- Also known as: Playboyy
- เล่นจนเป็นเรื่อง
- Genre: Drama; Romance; Boys' Love
- Written by: Den Panuwat Inthawat
- Directed by: Thanamin Wongskulphat
- Country of origin: Thailand
- Original language: Thai
- No. of seasons: 1
- No. of episodes: 14

Production
- Running time: 64 minutes
- Production company: Copy 'A Bangkok

Original release
- Network: GagaOOLala; iQIYI
- Release: 16 November 2023 – 29 February 2024

Playboyy (Thai: เล่นจนเป็นเรื่อง) is a Thai romantic drama television series with a Boys' Love (BL) theme, produced by Copy 'A Bangkok. The series premiered in November 2023 on GagaOOLala and was later released in 2025 on iQIYI.

The series was renewed for a second season on 2 October 2024, through a post on X announcing the casting call for the new episodes.

== Synopsis ==
When Nant mysteriously disappears, his twin brother Nont begins an investigation to uncover the truth. Zoey and First join him, delving into a hidden world involving the sex industry, illegal pornography, online encounters, and personal revenge. Along the way, each character faces their own fears and desires: Zoey, who struggles with intimacy, is drawn to Teena, while First becomes entangled with Soong, a former sex worker. The narrative blends mystery, romance, and human dilemmas while addressing sensitive and dark themes.

== Cast ==
=== Main ===
- Dech Narongdet Rungarun as "Nont" Nontnapas Saktawee / "Nant" Nantnarin Saktawee
- Shell Thakrit Chaiwut as "Prom" Prompitch Ponglert
- Korn Palat as "Zouey" Sippakorn Kichlertpaisal
- Koawoat Supasin as "Teena" Tinarath Somwong
- Chat Wasutha Phromchainun as "First" Yodsanant Sarvasiddiwongse
- Jack Jaktrin as "Soong" Sorawis Sergio Romano
- Vivit Pharunrit as "Captain" Kamontarsna Wang
- Boat Pakorn as "Keen" Phumin Suphakijkosol
- Fay Chintub Duangkaew as "Porsche" Patchanon Ponglert
- Jeffy Chutipon as "Jump" Jessada Sopha
- Parm Pawarate as "Puen" Pakorn Booncharoen
- Aun Warit Lertjaruvong as "Aob" Anand Aiemwilai
- View Thanathorn Bunsong as "Phop" Piphop Srikaew
- Win Jirapat Uttayananon as "Nuth" Nuthakrit Varindr-Vachararodch

=== Guest ===
- Hymnnae as Jason Lee (Ep. 10–13)

== Production ==
The series was produced by Copy 'A Bangkok and filmed in Bangkok, showcasing urban, university, and nightlife settings. GagaOOLala was the first platform to broadcast the series in 2023, and in 2025 it was also released on iQIYI.

== Broadcast ==
Playboyy aired from 16 November 2023 to 29 February 2024, with weekly episodes on Thursdays. Each episode runs for approximately 64 minutes.

== Reception ==
On iQIYI, the series achieved an average rating of 9.3/10 from over 2,000 reviews, while on MyDramaList it received 6.1/10 from more than 6,700 users.

Thai media widely covered the production. MGR Online highlighted the bold storyline and its exploration of sensitive topics, while Daily News emphasized the positive reception among younger audiences. Thairath discussed the cultural impact of the series in addressing sexuality and urban life.

International outlets also commented on the series: BLWatcher reviewed it as a daring production, and the Manila Bulletin interviewed the lead actors about their careers and the show's reception.
