= Duang with You =

2026 Thai television series

- Official series poster
- Thai: ด้วงกับเธอ
- Genre: Romantic comedy; Boys' love
- Based on: Not the Best but Still Good by peachhplease
- Written by: Dearest; Sereneraphat Pareyarpatsirene; Patiwat Bubphachart
- Directed by: Nathawat Piyanonpong
- Starring: Wanpichit Nimitparkpoom; Suppakarn Jirachotikul
- Music by: Hualampong Riddim
- Opening theme: "Someday, Say Yes (จีบไม่จบ)" by Proxie
- Ending theme: "Someday, Say Yes (จีบไม่จบ)" by Proxie (Ep. 1); "Take Our Time" by Jinwook (BUS), Phutatchai (BUS) (Ep. 2); "Don't Give Up (ไม่ชูสแต่ไม่ท้อ)" by TeeTee (Ep. 3); "Boom 1000%" by TeeTee, North, Wave (Ep. 4); "Heart's Timing (จังหวะยอมรัก)" by Por Suppakarn (Ep. 5); "Not the Best but Still Good" by TeeTee, Por (Ep. 6); "It Had to Be You" by Copper (BUS) (Ep. 7); "Next Status (รักได้แล้ว)" by DEXX (Ep. 8); "101% Love (เตรียมใจไว้รักเธอ)" by TeeTee (Ep. 9–10); "After the Grey" (Ep. 11); "Found (บทเพลงที่ตามหา)" by Por Suppakarn (Ep. 12)
- Country of origin: Thailand
- Original language: Thai
- No. of episodes: 12

Production
- Executive producer: Kittipat Champa
- Producer: Sunanta Sota
- Cinematography: Nattheerith Boonsaen; Panpode Boonprasert; Nitiwat Samunlor
- Running time: 48–82 minutes
- Production company: Domundi TV

Original release
- Network: One 31; iQIYI; YouTube
- Release: 31 January – 18 April 2026

Duang with You (Thai: ด้วงกับเธอ; RTGS: Duang Kap Thoe) is a 2026 Thai boys' love romantic comedy television series, starring Wanpichit Nimitparkpoom (TeeTee) and Suppakarn Jirachotikul (Por), based on the novel Not the Best but Still Good by peachhplease. The series was directed by Nathawat Piyanonpong (Kla) and produced by Domundi TV.

The series premiered on One 31 on 31 January 2026, airing on Saturdays at 21:30 ICT. The uncut version was made available for streaming at 22:30 ICT on iQIYI. The series was also made available for streaming at 22:30 ICT through the Mandee Channel on YouTube for select authorized regions. The series concluded on 18 April 2026. Re-edited versions of the series were made available on Netflix in select regions on 18 July 2026, and on Disney+ in Thailand in October 2026.

== Synopsis ==
After experiencing love at first sight, Duang (Wanpichit Nimitparkpoom), a popular decorative arts student at Sampanthasil University, sets out to win the affection of Qin (Suppakarn Jirachotikul), the equally popular but icy and reserved jazz student. However, the problem is that Qin tends to coldly reject anyone who hits on him.

Duang musters up the courage to confess his feelings to Qin at a bustling Loy Krathong festival, boldly stating that he is not asking for permission and that he is just letting him know that he intends to win his heart. Duang admits he finds Qin incredibly charming and feels as if he has been enchanted by his singing. While Qin does not reciprocate, he does not reject him either. Instead, Qin steps closer and offers Duang encouragement in his endeavour.

Enamoured by Qin's cuteness, Duang perseveres and devises a plan to soften Qin's heart, with the help of his friends, Jamie (Chatchapon Pranotphong) and Pae (Thanaphat Tansakul).

Duang and Qin's relationship begins to change when they are paired to perform at the university's open house. Duang learns that Qin dreams of becoming a singer. Despite Duang's lack of confidence in his own abilities to sing and dance, he vows to do his best, all in hopes of delivering a performance worthy of making Qin's dreams come true.

== Cast and characters ==
=== Main ===
- Wanpichit Nimitparkpoom (TeeTee) as Cheewin (Duang / Phodduang)
- Suppakarn Jirachotikul (Por) as Charat Kongsawadphakdee (Qin)
  - Anakin Maxwell Chang as Qin (young)
- Chatchapon Pranotphong (North) as Jettana (Jamie)
- Thanaphat Tansakul (Wave) as Prachai (Pae)
- Phoowitch Chan (Hugh) as Kim
- Thirati Eksathian (Thee) as Tong
- Sorranan Suksawat (Otto) as Marvis Lee

=== Supporting ===
- Phiyada Chutharatkul (Aom) as Qin's mother
- Sarut Vichitrananda (Big) as Qin's father
- Sripan Chunechomboon (Ohn) as Duang's mother
- Supoj Janjareon (Lift) as Duang's father
- Prarinyakorn Kansawa (Yim) as Funan (Duang's brother)
- Phanuroj Chalermkijporntavee (Pepper) as Tinn
- Bhasidi Petchsutee (Lookjun) as Alice
- Chanagun Arpornsutinan (Gunsmile) as Smile
- Ratchanon Ruenpech (Gun) as Tiw
- Vitchapol Somkid (Nice) as Peem
- Tipanan Nilsiam (Punch) as Sol
- Sira Simmee (Gap) as Duang's professor
- Supawan Poolcharoen (Leegade) as Yim
- Nattanan Rojjanajarunun (Nujnoh) as Gam
- Kritsanaphong Sripattiyanon (Suar) as Cho
- Kitpokin Sirinattakan (Peach) as Kie
- Patchanok Iamsa-ard (Berm) as Auntie Joo
- Janya Thanasawangkul (Ya) as Sorn

=== Guest ===
- Nutthawut Eamchuen (Bonus) as Communication arts student (Ep. 1)
- Natasit Uareksit (Nat) as PK (Ep. 2, 4, 6)
- Kornthas Rujeerattanavorapan (Max) as X (Ep. 3–6, 12)
- Siraphop Moonsarn (Phupha) as Nut (Ep. 6)
- Supamongkon Wongwisut (Jamessu) as Gus (Ep. 6)
- Thanut Osaithai (Fifa) as Aon (Ep. 6)
- Chnanvichya Roongsiripasert (Pete) as Pluem (Ep. 6)
- Tattoo Colour as themselves (Ep. 12)

== Soundtrack ==
In the behind-the-scenes documentary, director Nathawat Piyanonpong (Kla) remarked that the soundtrack would feature a combination of original songs and featured songs. Executive producer Kittipat Champa (Aoftion) shared that since the series has a strong connection with music, the series and the soundtrack would feature artists from the T-pop industry to make the series feel more complete and lively. The soundtrack was released as a series of singles, with a music video released each week.

Duang with You Soundtrack
No.	Title	Writer(s)	Artist	Length
1.	"Someday, Say Yes (จีบไม่จบ)"	Amp Achariya Dulyapaiboon	Proxie	3:29
2.	"Time (เวลา)" (Original by Pop Pongkool)	Amp Achariya Dulyapaiboon	Qin (Por Suppakarn)	4:16
3.	"Take Our Time"	Amp Achariya Dulyapaiboon	Jinwook (BUS); Phutatchai (BUS)	3:10
4.	"Don't Give Up (ไม่ชูสแต่ไม่ท้อ)"	Dome Jaruwat; Worachet Thanupongcharat	TeeTee	3:10
5.	"Boom 1000%"	Thanee Wongniwatkajorn (Gop Postcard)	TeeTee; North; Wave	3:00
6.	"Heart's Timing (จังหวะยอมรัก)"	Pure Kanin; Jeaniich	Por Suppakarn	3:17
7.	"It Had to Be You"	Amp Achariya Dulyapaiboon	Copper (BUS)	3:56
8.	"Sing Tee Saen Dee (สิ่งที่แสนดี)" (Original by Tattoo Colour)	Ruzz Pikatpairee	Duang (TeeTee); Qin (Por Suppakarn)	5:11
9.	"Not the Best but Still Good"	Amp Achariya Dulyapaiboon	TeeTee; Por	3:37
10.	"Next Status (รักได้แล้ว)"	Dome Jaruwat; Worachet Thanupongcharat	DEXX	3:37
11.	"101% Love (เตรียมใจไว้รักเธอ)"	Thanee Wongniwatkajorn (Gop Postcard)	TeeTee	3:06
12.	"After the Grey"	Amp Achariya Dulyapaiboon	Qin (Por Suppakarn)	2:40
13.	"Only You (ขอ)" (Original by Scrubb)	Nussaree Laohavongpienput	Duang (TeeTee)	3:50
14.	"Found (บทเพลงที่ตามหา)"	Thanwa Boonsoongnern (The Toys); Marc Tatchapon	Por Suppakarn	3:43

=== Other featured songs ===
In addition to the original songs and covers released as singles, the following songs were featured in the series:

Featured songs in Duang with You
No.	Title	Artist	Ep.	Notes	Ref.
1	"Sing Tee Saen Dee (สิ่งที่แสนดี)"	Tattoo Colour	5 (Uncut)	Cover by Duang and Qin (Ep. 6)	
2	"Guess Who? (เธอ ๆ เพื่อนเราชอบ)"	Serious Bacon	5 (Uncut)	Cover by Duang (Ep. 3)	
3	"Cloudy Sky (ฟ้าครึ้ม ๆ)"	Scrubb	5 (Uncut)		
4	"Time (เวลา)"	Pop Pongkool	5 (Uncut)	Cover by Qin (Ep. 1, 10)	
5	"Will You Still Love Me (จะรักฉันอยู่ไหม)"	NuNew	6 (Uncut)	Cover by Duang (Ep. 6)	
6	"Freeze (ห้ามขยับจับนะ)" (Original by Perses)	Nice (Atlas); Punch (4Eve)	6	Performed as Peem and Sol	
7	"Love Song (เพลงรัก)" (Original by Three Man Down)	Nice (Atlas); Punch (4Eve)	6	Performed as Peem and Sol	
8	"Be Everything for You, Even Though I Can't (If You Don't Love Me, It's Okay) (เป็นให้เธอทุกสิ่งแม้เป็นให้เธอไม่ได้ (ไม่รักไม่ว่ากัน))"	Duangdao Diawdai	7		
9	"Unforgettable (ขึ้นใจ)"	NuNew	8 (Uncut)		
10	"Ordinary People" (Original by John Legend)	Qin (Por Suppakarn)	9	Piano cover	
11	"Cup of Tea" (Original by Francesca Castro)	Qin (Por Suppakarn)	11		
12	"Cute (แฟนผมน่ารัก)" (Original by Bow Maylada feat. Lipta)	Duang (TeeTee); Qin (Por)	12		
13	"Wolf Blowing (ขาหมู)"	Tattoo Colour	12		
14	"Cinderella"	Tattoo Colour	12 (Uncut)		

== Production ==
=== Development ===
Duang with You was first announced at the DMD Line Up 2025+ "Glow Up" event at the Paragon Hall, Siam Paragon on 20 February 2025. The series was also announced as part of the iQIYI iJOY TH 2026 lineup at the Sphere Hall, EmSphere on 7 November 2025.

=== Casting ===
Wanpichit Nimitparkpoom (TeeTee) and Suppakarn Jirachotikul (Por) were chosen to star in the lead roles of the series. The pair appeared on the reality show DMD Friendship the Reality, It Takes Two (2024), where they won the Best Partner Award. They previously worked together with director Kla in the series Your Sky (2024) and Your Sky of Us (2025). The pair also debuted as members of the T-pop group DEXX, under DMD Music in June 2025. The cast also included fellow DEXX member Prarinyakorn Kansawa (Yim), Ratchanon Ruenpech (Gun) of Proxie, Tipanan Nilsiam (Punch) of 4Eve, and Vitchapol Somkid (Nice) of Atlas.

=== Filming ===
A blessing ceremony for good luck was held on the rooftop of the Phenix Pratunam mall in Bangkok on 2 July 2025. Principal photography began on 15 July 2025 and concluded on 24 February 2026. Filming locations included Mahidol University, Wat Pho, and Siam Square. Additional scenes were filmed in Fukuoka Prefecture at the end of March 2026.

Director Kla commented on the challenges of filming during the rainy season, having to carefully determine the best shooting hours based on the weather forecast, which could be inconsistent at times, and then having to find solutions to adapt if it rained. Filming on university campuses was also limited to weekends in order to avoid disturbing students and staff. These circumstances limited the time frame available to film and prolonged the shooting process.

== Marketing ==
The series was promoted with the Duang with You: When We Met Ep. 1 press conference and premiere screening event, held at MCC Hall, The Mall Lifestore Ngamwongwan in Nonthaburi on 31 January 2026. The event featured performances by the cast, in addition to a conversation about the series with the cast, the director and the executive producer. Fans were also able to watch the premiere screening of the first episode together with the cast and other actors from Domundi TV.

A screening event for the fourth episode was held at Siam Pavalai, Siam Paragon on 21 February 2026. Duang with You busking event was then held at Siam Square Block I on 22 February 2026. Duang with You Ep. 6 Screening: Open House Open Heart event was held at MGI Hall, Bravo BKK on 7 March 2026. A screening event for the seventh episode was held at SF World Cinema, CentralWorld on 14 March 2026. A screening event for the ninth episode was held at MCC Hall, The Mall Lifestore Bangkapi on 28 March 2026. TeeTee and Por performed at the Thaiconic Songkran 2026 festival, organized by Iconsiam, in addition to holding the Open Air Night with You Ep. 11 screening event at Iconsiam Park on 11 April 2026.

The final episode was promoted with the Duang with You: Love Is All Around show and screening event, held at Union Hall, Union Mall on 18 April 2026. The event allowed fans to watch the series together and enjoy performances by the cast. The event also featured a special guest appearance by Princess Ubol Ratana, who performed "Someday, Say Yes (จีบไม่จบ)" with TeeTee and Por, as well as her single "Go Ahead and Flirt, I'm Still Single (จีบโลดยังโสดอยู่)". TeeTee and the princess became acquainted when he competed in the 12th edition of the To Be Number One Idol contest in 2022. The contest was hosted by the youth anti-drug campaign founded by the princess.

Following the success of the series, the cast went on to perform at the Duang Go Round Concert held at the Impact Arena on 15–16 August 2026. The concert also featured performances by Jinwook, Phutatchai, Copper and Marckris of BUS, DEXX, as well as guest performances by Ohn Sripan, who plays Duang's mother, Trinity, Scrubb, NuNew, The Toys, and Proxie.

=== Fan meetings ===
Year	Date	Event	Venue	Ref.
2026	18 October	Duang Go Round Fanmeeting in Japan	Nihonbashi Mitsui Hall	

== Awards and nominations ==
Award nominations for Duang with You
Year	Award	Category	Nominee(s)	Result	Ref.
2026	Y Universe Awards 2025	The Best Noticeable	Duang with You	Nominated	
2026	The Viral Hits Love Moment Awards 2026	BL Title of the People (People's Choice Award)	Duang with You	Won	
2026	Thailand Y Content Awards 2025	Best Cinematography	Duang with You	Nominated	
2026	Thailand Y Content Awards 2025	Best Couple of the Year	Wanpichit Nimitparkpoom and Suppakarn Jirachotikul	Nominated	
2026	Thailand Y Content Awards 2025	Best Director	Nathawat Piyanonpong	Nominated	
2026	Thailand Y Content Awards 2025	Best Leading Actor	Wanpichit Nimitparkpoom	Nominated	
2026	Thailand Y Content Awards 2025	Best Promotion of Thai Tourism	Duang with You	Won	
2026	Thailand Y Content Awards 2025	Best Series Script	Duang with You	Nominated	
2026	Thailand Y Content Awards 2025	Best Series Soundtrack	"Someday, Say Yes"	Nominated	
2026	Thailand Y Content Awards 2025	Popular Vote	Wanpichit Nimitparkpoom	Nominated	
2026	Thailand Y Content Awards 2025	Popular Vote	Suppakarn Jirachotikul	Nominated	
2026	Thailand Y Content Awards 2025	Rising Star of the Year	Wanpichit Nimitparkpoom	Nominated	
2026	Thailand Y Content Awards 2025	Rising Star of the Year	Suppakarn Jirachotikul	Nominated	
2026	Nakarat Awards 2026	Popular Vote	Wanpichit Nimitparkpoom and Suppakarn Jirachotikul	Won	
2026	Pattaya International Film Festival 2026	Outstanding BL Series	Duang with You	Won	
2026	Pattaya International Film Festival 2026	Power Couple	Wanpichit Nimitparkpoom and Suppakarn Jirachotikul	Won	
2026	Y Entertain Awards 2026	Best Series OST of the Year	"Someday, Say Yes"	Nominated	
2026	Y Entertain Awards 2026	Most Popular Y Novel	Not the Best but Still Good	Nominated	
2026	Y Entertain Awards 2026	Rising Star Couple	Wanpichit Nimitparkpoom and Suppakarn Jirachotikul	Nominated	
2026	Praew Awards 2026	Rookie of the Year	Wanpichit Nimitparkpoom and Suppakarn Jirachotikul	Won	
2026	Mint Awards 2026	Entertainment Program of the Year	Duang with You	Won	
2026	Feed x Khaosod Awards 2026	Best Chemistry of the Year	Wanpichit Nimitparkpoom and Suppakarn Jirachotikul	Nominated	
2026	Feed x Khaosod Awards 2026	Best Chemistry (Popular Vote)	Wanpichit Nimitparkpoom and Suppakarn Jirachotikul	Nominated	
2026	Feed x Khaosod Awards 2026	Most Popular Male Actor (Popular Vote)	Wanpichit Nimitparkpoom	Nominated	
2026	Feed x Khaosod Awards 2026	Most Popular Series/Drama (Popular Vote)	Duang with You	Nominated	
2026	Maya TV Awards 2026	Outstanding Series of the Year	Duang with You	Won	
2026	Maya TV Awards 2026	Male Couple of the Year	Wanpichit Nimitparkpoom and Suppakarn Jirachotikul	Nominated	
2026	Maya TV Awards 2026	Rising Star Male of the Year	Wanpichit Nimitparkpoom	Nominated	
2026	Maya TV Awards 2026	Rising Star Male of the Year	Suppakarn Jirachotikul	Won	
2026	Howe Awards 2026	Hottest Series Award	Duang with You	Nominated	
2026	Howe Awards 2026	Hottest Trending of the Year	Duang with You	Won	
2026	Howe Awards 2026	The Best Couple Award	Wanpichit Nimitparkpoom and Suppakarn Jirachotikul	Nominated	
2026	Howe Awards 2026	Shining Male Award	Wanpichit Nimitparkpoom	Nominated	
2026	iQIYI iJOY TH 2027	Most-Watched Thai Title Worldwide on iQIYI International	Duang with You	Won	
2027	Kazz Awards 2027	Youth Choice of the Year	Suppakarn Jirachotikul (1st place)	Won	
2027	Kazz Awards 2027	Youth Choice of the Year	Wanpichit Nimitparkpoom (2nd place)	Won	
