= DEXX =

Thai boy band

DEXX เด็กซ์
- DEXX in 2025; From left to right: Auau, Por, Jamessu, Tutor, Yim, and TeeTee

Background information
- Origin: Bangkok, Thailand
- Genre: T-pop
- Years active: 2025–present
- Label: DMD Music
- Members: Jamessu; Yim; Tutor; Auau; Por; TeeTee

DEXX (Thai: เด็กซ์; stylized in all caps) is a Thai boy band formed in 2025, under the label DMD Music. The group consists of six members: Jamessu, Yim, Tutor, Auau, Por, and TeeTee. They debuted with their first single "Clang Clang" on 24 June 2025.

== Name ==
DEXX is an acronym of "Diverse Element of XX", where the group's concept embraces the diversity of music genres and fashion styles.

== History ==
=== Pre-debut activities ===
Prior to the formation of DEXX, the six members had been working as actors under Domundi TV. Supamongkon Wongwisut (Jamessu) had starred in Bed Friend (2023). He also appeared on The Middleman's Love (2023) and Battle of the Writers (2024), starring fellow members Koraphat Lamnoi (Tutor) and Prarinyakorn Kansawa (Yim).

Thanaphum Sestasittikul (Auau) and Suppakarn Jirachotikul (Por) competed on the survival show Laz Icon in 2021. They later debuted under 4nologue as members of the former boy group DVI in January 2023. After DVI disbanded in 2024, Auau and Por joined Domundi TV as members of DMD Gen 4 and appeared on the reality show DMD Friendship the Reality, It Takes Two (2024). Wanpichit Nimitparkpoom (TeeTee) was also brought onto the show, where he and Por selected each other to work as partners and won the Best Partner Award. The trio went on to appear in Your Sky (2024) and Your Sky of Us (2025).

=== 2025: Debut ===
The group made its debut on 24 June 2025, with the release of their first single, "Clang Clang", produced by singer-songwriter Hye of Paper Planes. The group held their first single debut showcase at Siam Square Block I on 26 June 2025. They also performed on the program T-Pop Stage.

On 14 October 2025, they released their second single "อกหักเป็นเพื่อนเธอ (Beside You)", produced by singer-songwriter The Toys. The group went on to release their single "Skinship" on 8 December 2025, which was later used as the theme song for DMD Friendship the Reality, The Third Chapter (2025).

=== 2026–present: Duang with You, Mr. Fanboy ===
TeeTee and Por went on to star in Duang with You (2026), featuring appearances by fellow group members Yim and Jamessu. On 1 April 2026, DEXX released their pop single, "รักได้แล้ว (Next Status)", as their contribution to the soundtrack for Duang with You, collaborating with producer Worachet Thanupongcharat (Benz), who also co-wrote the song with Dome Jaruwat.

Auau and Jamessu went on to star in Mr. Fanboy (2026), featuring guest appearances by TeeTee and Por.

In June 2026, it was announced that the members of DEXX would appear in the upcoming series Friend Benefit, starring TeeTee, Por, Auau, and Worapong Walor (Save).

== Members ==
- Supamongkon Wongwisut (Jamessu)
- Prarinyakorn Kansawa (Yim)
- Koraphat Lamnoi (Tutor)
- Thanaphum Sestasittikul (Auau)
- Suppakarn Jirachotikul (Por)
- Wanpichit Nimitparkpoom (TeeTee)

== Discography ==
=== Singles ===
==== As lead artist ====
Year	Title	Ref.
2025	"Clang Clang"	
2025	"อกหักเป็นเพื่อนเธอ (Beside You)"	
2025	"Skinship"	

==== Soundtrack appearances ====
Year	Title	Album	Ref.
2026	"รักได้แล้ว (Next Status)"	Duang with You OST	

== Awards and nominations ==
Award nominations for DEXX
Year	Award	Category	Nominee(s)	Result	Ref.
2025	Weibo Music Awards 2025	Rookie Group of the Year	DEXX	Won	
2025	BreakTudo Awards 2025	Song by New International Artist	"Clang Clang"	Nominated	
2026	The Viral Hits Awards 2025	Most Popular Rookie Male Group	DEXX	Won	
2026	TOTY Music Awards 2025	Popular Rookie of the Year	"Clang Clang"	Nominated	
2026	Kazz Awards 2026	Trending Artist Award	DEXX	Won	
2026	Kom Chad Luek Awards 2026	Most Popular T-Pop	DEXX	Won	
2026	Howe Awards 2026	Hottest Artist Award	DEXX	Won	
