= Suppakarn Jirachotikul =

Thai actor and singer (born 2002)

- ศุภการ จิรโชติกุล
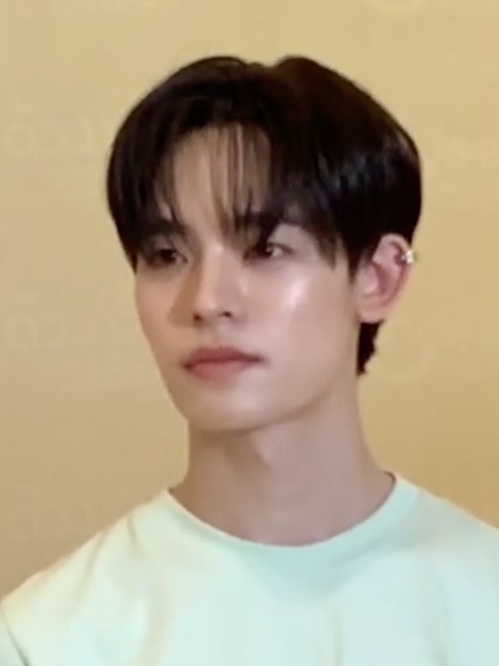
- Suppakarn in July 2025
- Born: 17 October 2002 (age 24); Bangkok, Thailand
- Other name: Por (ป๋อ)
- Education: Dusit Thani College
- Occupations: Actor; singer
- Years active: 2018–present
- Agent: Domundi TV
- Known for: Punlee in Your Sky; Qin in Duang with You
- Height: 1.74 m (5 ft 9 in)
- Musical career
- Genres: Pop; T-pop
- Instruments: Vocals; guitar
- Labels: 4nologue; DMD Music
- Member of: DEXX
- Formerly of: DVI

Suppakarn Jirachotikul (Thai: ศุภการ จิรโชติกุล; born 17 October 2002), nicknamed Por (Thai: ป๋อ), is a Thai actor under Domundi TV and a member of the Thai boy band DEXX under DMD Music. He participated on the survival show Laz Icon in 2021. He debuted as a member of the former boy group DVI under 4nologue in 2023.

He made his acting debut as Punlee in Your Sky (2024). He is best known for his lead role as Qin in Duang with You (2026).

== Early life and education ==
Suppakarn was born on 17 October 2002. He has a sister who is older than him by about 1.5 years. His family operates a jewellery business.

He attended elementary school at Bangkok Christian College. He sang in a school chorus group, starting at around the age of nine, from the third grade until the sixth grade (Prathom 3–6).

Por shared that he once told his mother that he wanted to become an actor, but instead she sent him to take singing lessons in the ninth grade (Matthayom 3), training for approximately 6 months. Por was scouted by one of the "Big 3" K-pop agencies at the time, but he wanted to stay in Thailand, adding that he did not feel confident in himself then. In 2018, while training under Grammy Vocal Studio, he performed as a guitarist for the group Septave at the Sanamluang Music Playtime Season 4 event. He graduated from Panyarat High School in 2021.

Por initially went to study culinary arts at Le Cordon Bleu Dusit Culinary School, Dusit Thani College, due to his love for food. However, he was also partaking in activities outside of school, including competing on the survival show Laz Icon, and spending late nights training as an artist. He realized that he did not have the time for his studies and decided to switch programs to focus more on music.

== Career ==
=== 2018–2024: Career beginnings with 4nologue, Laz Icon, DVI ===
Por joined 4nologue as a trainee in the tenth grade (Matthayom 4). In November 2020, Por was one of 18 trainees featured on the single "Yesterday Today Tomorrow" by the boy band Trinity. Por left the company after training for around 4 years.

In 2021, he competed as an independent artist on the survival show Laz Icon, hosted by One 31 in collaboration with Lazada to form the next boy group in the industry. After the end of the competition, Por returned to 4nologue, inviting some of his fellow competitors to join, including Thanaphum Sestasittikul (Auau). Por was told he was not ready to debut, but was given one month to train hard and prove himself.

Por and Auau were announced as members of the six-member boy group DVI (ดี-วาย di-wai). The group made its pre-debut at the Octopop music festival held at the Rajamangala National Stadium on 16 October 2022. DVI released their debut single "Sugar" on 30 January 2023. The group collaborated with the Japanese boy band Psychic Fever from Exile Tribe, releasing their single "To the Top" in February, and performing at the Battle of Tokyo: Code of Jr.Exile 5-day concert event, held at Saitama Super Arena on 21–23 July, and at Kyocera Dome Osaka on 29–30 July. The group released "Second Chance" in July and "เพื่อน (แอบ) รัก - Close(d) Friend" on 1 February 2024. DVI disbanded after 4nologue announced the decision to terminate the contracts of all members on 29 February 2024.

=== 2024–2025: Domundi, Your Sky, DEXX ===
After leaving 4nologue, Por was invited to join Domundi TV and was offered a role in the series Your Sky (2024). Por and his former DVI groupmate Auau joined Domundi as members of DMD Gen 4. They then appeared on the reality show DMD Friendship the Reality, It Takes Two, which premiered in October 2024. The show brought together DMD Gen 4 members to develop their skills, such as modelling, singing and acting, while in search for a compatible on-screen partner. Por and Wanpichit Nimitparkpoom (TeeTee) chose each other as partners. In the final episode, the duo received the Best Partner Award, winning the chance to star as the lead actors in a future production.

Por made his acting debut as Punlee in Your Sky, which premiered on 17 November 2024. Por also performed on the soundtrack with his song "ใกล้ใจ (Close to the Heart)", released on 29 January 2025. The music video featured his character's love interest, Ghlaijai, played by TeeTee. Por later reprised his role as Punlee in the special Your Sky of Us (2025).

In June 2025, Domundi announced the formation of a six-member boy group named DEXX under DMD Music, consisting of James, Tutor, Yim, Auau, Por, and TeeTee. The group debuted with their first single "Clang Clang" on 24 June 2025.

=== 2026–present: Duang with You ===
Por starred in his first lead role in Duang with You (2026) as Qin, an icy and reserved jazz student who gets pursued by a decorative arts student named Duang, played by TeeTee. The soundtrack featured performances by Por, such as his solo singles "จังหวะยอมรัก (Heart's Timing)" and "บทเพลงที่ตามหา (Found)", his duets with TeeTee, "สิ่งที่แสนดี (Sing Tee Saen Dee)" and "Not the Best but Still Good", as well as the single "รักได้แล้ว (Next Status)" with DEXX.

TeeTee and Por attended several screening events for the series, where they gave special performances and watched episodes with fans. TeeTee and Por shared that they were surprised by the support for the series and that the response had exceeded their expectations. The duo went on to headline the Duang Go Round Concert, held at the Impact Arena on 15–16 August 2026.

On 27 April 2026, TeeTee and Por revealed their fandom mascot named "BokBear". On 22 June 2026, their fandom was given the name "Vava" (วาวา wawa), which comes from the word chattawa (จัตวา 'fourth'), referring to the tone mark that appears in the names of both TeeTee (ตี๋ตี๋) and Por (ป๋อ).

In June 2026, it was announced that Por and TeeTee would star in the upcoming series Friend Benefit, featuring Auau, Worapong Walor (Save), and fellow members of DEXX.

== Discography ==
=== Singles ===
==== Collaborations ====
Year	Title	Artist	Ref.
2020	"Yesterday Today Tomorrow"	Trinity & 4nologue Trainee	
2021	"ที่หนึ่งในใจของเธอ (Last One)"	Laz Icon	
2023	"Sugar"	DVI	
2023	"To the Top" (feat. DVI)	Psychic Fever from Exile Tribe	
2023	"Second Chance"	DVI	
2024	"เพื่อน (แอบ) รัก - Close(d) Friend"	DVI	
2025	"Perfect Match"	DMD Gen4	

==== Soundtrack appearances ====
Year	Title	Album	Ref.
2025	"ใกล้ใจ (Close to the Heart)"	Your Sky OST	
2026	"เวลา (Time)" (Cover) (Original by Pop Pongkool)	Duang with You OST	
2026	"จังหวะยอมรัก (Heart's Timing)"	Duang with You OST	
2026	"สิ่งที่แสนดี (Sing Tee Saen Dee)" (Cover) (Original by Tattoo Colour) (with TeeTee)	Duang with You OST	
2026	"Not the Best but Still Good" (with TeeTee)	Duang with You OST	
2026	"รักได้แล้ว (Next Status)" (with DEXX)	Duang with You OST	
2026	"After the Grey"	Duang with You OST	
2026	"บทเพลงที่ตามหา (Found)"	Duang with You OST	
2026	"Time To Say Goodbye (หมดเวลารัก)"	Mr. Fanboy OST	

== Filmography ==
=== Television series ===
Year	Title	Role	Network	Notes	Ref.
2024	Your Sky	"Punlee" Sasin Phisut	One 31, iQIYI	Supporting role	
2025	Your Sky of Us	"Punlee" Sasin Phisut	One 31, iQIYI	Supporting role	
2026	Duang with You	"Qin" Charat Kongsawadphakdee	One 31, iQIYI	Main role	
2026	Mr. Fanboy	Himself	One 31, iQIYI	Guest role (Ep. 1)	
TBA	Friend Benefit	"Pik" / "Pookpik" Sanit Jirawatthada		Main role	

=== Television show ===
Year	Title	Network	Notes
2021	Laz Icon	One 31	
2021	Sound Check	One 31	Ep. 73 (20 October 2021)
2023	Sound Check	One 31	Ep. 32 (7 March 2023)
2023	รอบวัน Rop Wan	One 31	Ep. 22 (8 August 2023)
2024	รอบวัน Rop Wan	One 31	Ep. 147 (1 February 2024)
2024	DMD Friendship the Reality, It Takes Two	One 31	
2025	โตมาเป็น Grow Up to Be	One Playground	Ep. 18
2025	คุณพระช่วย Khun Pra Chuay	Workpoint TV	25 May 2025
2025	T-Pop Stage	Workpoint TV	26 June 2025
2025	Thailand Music Countdown	Channel 3	Ep. 12 (3 August 2025)
2025	รอบวัน Rop Wan	One 31	16 October 2025
2026	DMD Friendship the Reality, The Third Chapter	iQIYI	Ep. 6
2026	รอบวัน Rop Wan	One 31	10 February 2026
2026	โตมาเป็น Grow Up to Be	Asok Montri	Ep. 24
2026	The Wall Song	Workpoint TV	Ep. 288 (12 March 2026)
2026	3Fight3 Basket Boy Season 2	Workpoint TV	Team White, Match 9 (29 March 2025), 10 (5 April 2025)
2026	Running Man Thailand	One 31	Ep. 7
2026	4 Podum	One 31	Ep. 30 (8 July 2026)
2026	เปรี้ยวปาก Preawpak	Channel 3	Ep. 29 (18 July 2026)
2026	แฉ Chae	GMM 25	22 September 2026
2026	จริงหรือมั่ว Fact or Fake	One 31	Ep. 35 (2 November 2026)

=== Music video appearances ===
Year	Title	Artist	Ref.
2018	"ฝืนใจบอกลา" (Reluctantly Say Goodbye)	D Day	
2019	"ตัวแทน" (Stand-In)	D Day	
2022	"Champagne Poppin"	Trinity	
2026	"ฮอบ (Hob)"	Proxie	
2026	"จุ๊บเธอ (Jubu Jub)" (feat. DMD Boys)	DMD Cute Boys	

== Live performances ==
Year	Date	Name	Venue	Ref.
2022	16 October	Octopop 2022	Rajamangala National Stadium	
2023	5 February	Ballistik Boys vs Psychic Fever The Survival 2023 Thailand	CentralWorld Live	
2023	26 June	Psychic Fever Live Tour 2023: P.C.F	Zepp Haneda	
2023	21–23 July	Battle of Tokyo: Code of Jr.Exile	Saitama Super Arena	
2023	29–30 July	Battle of Tokyo: Code of Jr.Exile	Kyocera Dome Osaka	
2023	17 September	Trinity Breath of Desire Concert	Impact Arena	
2023	21 October	Octopop 2023	Thunderdome Stadium	
2025	12 January	DMD Gen3 Fan Meeting: Friendship Never Ends	Phenix Grand Ballroom	
2025	30 August	DMD Sport Day	BITEC Live	
2026	23 March	DMD World in Japan: Start to Bloom	Toyosu PIT, Tokyo	
2026	2–3 May	DMD Land 3: The Final Land	Impact Arena	
2026	1 August	DMD Sport Day 2026: High School Vibes	Indoor Stadium Huamark	
2026	15–16 August	Duang Go Round Concert	Impact Arena	
2026	27 September	Atlas: Rising Up Concert	Impact Arena	

== Awards and nominations ==
Award nominations for Suppakarn Jirachotikul
Year	Award	Category	Nominee(s)	Result	Ref.
2025	Nine Entertain Awards 2025	Rising Star Couple	with Wanpichit Nimitparkpoom	Nominated	
2025	Thailand Y Content Awards 2024	Rising Star of the Year		Nominated	
2025	Y Entertain Awards 2025	Rising Star Couple	with Wanpichit Nimitparkpoom	Nominated	
2026	Nine Entertain Awards 2026	Shining Star of the Year	with Wanpichit Nimitparkpoom	Nominated	
2026	Thailand Y Content Awards 2025	Best Couple of the Year	with Wanpichit Nimitparkpoom	Nominated	
2026	Thailand Y Content Awards 2025	Popular Vote		Nominated	
2026	Thailand Y Content Awards 2025	Rising Star of the Year		Nominated	
2026	Nakarat Awards 2026	Popular Vote	with Wanpichit Nimitparkpoom	Won	
2026	Pattaya International Film Festival 2026	Power Couple	with Wanpichit Nimitparkpoom	Won	
2026	Y Entertain Awards 2026	Rising Star Couple	with Wanpichit Nimitparkpoom	Nominated	
2026	Praew Awards 2026	Rookie of the Year	with Wanpichit Nimitparkpoom	Won	
2026	Feed x Khaosod Awards 2026	Best Chemistry of the Year	with Wanpichit Nimitparkpoom	Nominated	
2026	Feed x Khaosod Awards 2026	Best Chemistry (Popular Vote)	with Wanpichit Nimitparkpoom	Nominated	
2026	Maya TV Awards 2026	Male Couple of the Year	with Wanpichit Nimitparkpoom	Nominated	
2026	Maya TV Awards 2026	Rising Star Male of the Year		Won	
2026	Howe Awards 2026	The Best Couple Award	with Wanpichit Nimitparkpoom	Nominated	
2027	Kazz Awards 2027	Youth Choice of the Year (1st place)		Won	
