= Wanpichit Nimitparkpoom =

Thai actor and singer (born 2005)

- วันพิชิต นิมิตภาคภูมิ
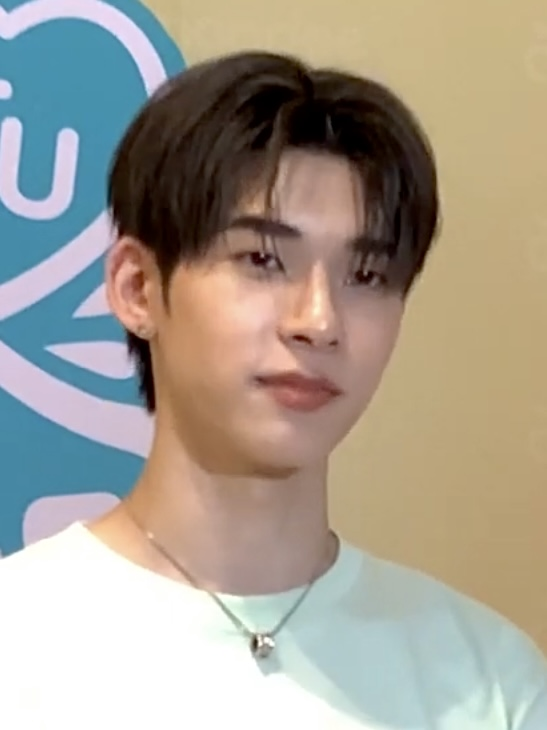
- Wanpichit in July 2025
- Born: 29 March 2005 (age 21); Chiang Mai, Thailand
- Other names: Tee (ตี๋), TeeTee (ตี๋ตี๋)
- Education: University of the Thai Chamber of Commerce
- Occupations: Actor; singer
- Years active: 2022–present
- Agent: Domundi TV
- Known for: Ghlaijai in Your Sky; Duang in Duang with You
- Height: 1.80 m (5 ft 11 in)
- Musical career
- Genres: Pop; T-pop
- Label: DMD Music
- Member of: DEXX

Wanpichit Nimitparkpoom (Thai: วันพิชิต นิมิตภาคภูมิ; born 29 March 2005), nicknamed TeeTee (Thai: ตี๋ตี๋), is a Thai actor under Domundi TV and a member of the Thai boy band DEXX under DMD Music. He participated in the 12th edition of the To Be Number One Idol competition in 2022.

He made his acting debut as Ghlaijai in Your Sky (2024). He is best known for his lead role as Duang in Duang with You (2026).

== Early life and education ==
Wanpichit was born on 29 March 2005. He was born and raised in Chiang Mai and has one older sister.

He graduated from Yupparaj Wittayalai School. He initially went on to study digital marketing, but switched programs in his second year to balance studying online and working in the entertainment industry. He completed his studies at the University of the Thai Chamber of Commerce, pursuing a Bachelor of Business Administration in Management.

== Career ==
=== 2022–2023: To Be Number One Idol 12 ===
In 2022, TeeTee competed in the 12th edition of the To Be Number One Idol youth model contest, hosted by the Department of Mental Health of Thailand and the youth anti-drug campaign founded by Princess Ubol Ratana. He was a finalist in the Chiang Mai preliminary round in February. He was eliminated during the northern regional competition in March, but he was encouraged to try again in Bangkok, where it was open to participants from all regions in Thailand. In April, he competed at the Bangkok regional level and was one of 11 participants selected to compete at the national level. In July, he advanced to the final round of the competition as one of the 16 finalists.

TeeTee went on to participate in many activities associated with the project, including serving as an assistant host on the show To Be Number One Variety. TeeTee shared that the contest helped him develop his skills in singing, dancing and acting. He was introduced to an artist manager who asked if he wanted to join the entertainment industry. Initially, TeeTee said no because he wanted to study at a university in Chiang Mai to be close to home. He ultimately decided to go study in Bangkok, where he was then introduced to Kittipat Jampa (Aoftion), who invited him to join Domundi TV.

=== 2023–2025: Domundi, Your Sky, DEXX ===
TeeTee joined Domundi as a member of DMD Gen 3. He then appeared on the reality show DMD Friendship the Reality, which premiered in December 2023. The show brought together DMD Gen 3 members to develop their skills, such as modelling, singing and acting, while in search for a compatible on-screen partner. TeeTee did not end up choosing a partner, sharing that he felt like he was not ready at the time. He wanted to improve his own skills and he also wanted to meet someone with similar interests.

TeeTee was featured on the song "รักเธอเต็มฟีด (Love Feed)", released ahead of his appearance at the DMD Land 2: Wondershow concert, held at the Impact Arena on 13 January 2024.

TeeTee was brought back to participate in the second season of the show, DMD Friendship the Reality, It Takes Two (2024), where he and Suppakarn Jirachotikul (Por) chose each other as partners. In the final episode, the duo received the Best Partner Award, winning the chance to star as the lead actors in a future production.

TeeTee made his acting debut in Your Sky (2024) as Ghlaijai, the love interest of Punlee, played by Por. He later reprised his role as Ghlaijai in the special Your Sky of Us (2025).

In June 2025, Domundi announced the formation of a six-member boy group named DEXX under DMD Music, consisting of James, Tutor, Yim, Auau, Por, and TeeTee. The group debuted with their first single "Clang Clang" on 24 June 2025.

=== 2026–present: Duang with You ===
TeeTee starred in his first lead role in Duang with You (2026) as Duang, a decorative arts student who experiences love at first sight and sets out to win the affection of a jazz student named Qin, played by Por. The soundtrack featured performances by TeeTee, such as his first solo singles "ไม่ชูสแต่ไม่ท้อ (Don't Give Up)" and "เตรียมใจไว้รักเธอ (101% Love)", his duets with Por, "สิ่งที่แสนดี (Sing Tee Saen Dee)" and "Not the Best but Still Good", as well as the single "รักได้แล้ว (Next Status)" with DEXX.

TeeTee and Por attended several screening events for the series, where they gave special performances and watched episodes with fans. TeeTee and Por shared that they were surprised by the support for the series and that the response had exceeded their expectations. The duo went on to headline the Duang Go Round Concert, held at the Impact Arena on 15–16 August 2026.

On 27 April 2026, TeeTee and Por revealed their fandom mascot named "BokBear". On 22 June 2026, their fandom was given the name "Vava" (วาวา wawa), which comes from the word chattawa (จัตวา 'fourth'), referring to the tone mark that appears in the names of both TeeTee (ตี๋ตี๋) and Por (ป๋อ).

In June 2026, it was announced that TeeTee and Por would star in the upcoming series Friend Benefit, featuring Auau, Worapong Walor (Save), and fellow members of DEXX.

== Discography ==
=== Singles ===
==== Collaborations ====
Year	Title	Artist	Ref.
2024	"รักเธอเต็มฟีด (Love Feed)"	DMD Boys	
2024	"ศูนย์รวมความน่ารัก (Cuteness Center)"	DMD Gen3	

==== Soundtrack appearances ====
Year	Title	Album	Ref.
2026	"ไม่ชูสแต่ไม่ท้อ (Don't Give Up)"	Duang with You OST	
2026	"Boom 1000%" (with North, Wave)	Duang with You OST	
2026	"สิ่งที่แสนดี (Sing Tee Saen Dee)" (Cover) (Original by Tattoo Colour) (with Por Suppakarn)	Duang with You OST	
2026	"Not the Best but Still Good" (with Por Suppakarn)	Duang with You OST	
2026	"รักได้แล้ว (Next Status)" (with DEXX)	Duang with You OST	
2026	"เตรียมใจไว้รักเธอ (101% Love)"	Duang with You OST	
2026	"ขอ (Only You)" (Cover) (Original by Scrubb)	Duang with You OST	

== Filmography ==
=== Television series ===
Year	Title	Role	Network	Notes	Ref.
2024	Your Sky	Ghlaijai Borirat	One 31, iQIYI	Supporting role	
2025	Your Sky of Us	Ghlaijai Borirat	One 31, iQIYI	Supporting role	
2026	Duang with You	"Duang" / "Phodduang" Cheewin	One 31, iQIYI	Main role	
2026	Mr. Fanboy	Himself	One 31, iQIYI	Guest role (Ep. 1)	
TBA	Friend Benefit	Jaijai		Main role	

=== Television show ===
Year	Title	Network	Notes
2022	To Be Number One Variety	NBT 2HD	9 July, 23 July 2022
2023	To Be Number One Variety	NBT 2HD	26 August – 16 September, 16–30 December 2023
2023	DMD Friendship the Reality	Mandee Channel	
2024	To Be Number One Variety	NBT 2HD	6 January, 9–30 March, 1–15 June, 21 September – 12 October, 16 November – 7 December 2024
2024	Sawatdee Khrap T-Boys!! 今、注目すべきタイのトップアーティストに密着	TV Tokyo, TVer	
2024	DMD Friendship the Reality, It Takes Two	One 31	
2025	To Be Number One Variety	NBT 2HD	11 January – 1 February 2025
2025	โตมาเป็น Grow Up to Be	One Playground	Ep. 18
2025	คุณพระช่วย Khun Pra Chuay	Workpoint TV	25 May 2025
2025	T-Pop Stage	Workpoint TV	26 June 2025
2025	Thailand Music Countdown	Channel 3	Ep. 12 (3 August 2025)
2025	รอบวัน Rop Wan	One 31	16 October 2025
2026	DMD Friendship the Reality, The Third Chapter	iQIYI	Ep. 6
2026	รอบวัน Rop Wan	One 31	10 February 2026
2026	โตมาเป็น Grow Up to Be	Asok Montri	Ep. 24
2026	The Wall Song	Workpoint TV	Ep. 288 (12 March 2026)
2026	3Fight3 Basket Boy Season 2	Workpoint TV	Team Black, Match 7 (15 March 2026), 10 (5 April 2026)
2026	Running Man Thailand	One 31	Ep. 7
2026	4 Podum	One 31	Ep. 30 (8 July 2026)
2026	เปรี้ยวปาก Preawpak	Channel 3	Ep. 29 (18 July 2026)
2026	แฉ Chae	GMM 25	22 September 2026
2026	จริงหรือมั่ว Fact or Fake	One 31	Ep. 35 (2 November 2026)

=== Music video appearances ===
Year	Title	Artist	Ref.
2024	"ปิ๊งไปป่ะ (So Bright Baby)"	Zee Pruk, NuNew	
2025	"ใกล้ใจ (Close to the Heart)"	Por Suppakarn	
2026	"ฮอบ (Hob)"	Proxie	
2026	"จุ๊บเธอ (Jubu Jub)" (feat. DMD Boys)	DMD Cute Boys	

== Live performances ==
Year	Date	Name	Venue	Ref.
2024	13 January	DMD Land 2: Wondershow	Impact Arena	
2024	21 February	DMD Land in Japan: Wondershow	Tachikawa Stage Garden, Tokyo	
2025	12 January	DMD Gen3 Fan Meeting: Friendship Never Ends	Phenix Grand Ballroom	
2025	30 August	DMD Sport Day	BITEC Live	
2026	23 March	DMD World in Japan: Start to Bloom	Toyosu PIT, Tokyo	
2026	2–3 May	DMD Land 3: The Final Land	Impact Arena	
2026	1 August	DMD Sport Day 2026: High School Vibes	Indoor Stadium Huamark	
2026	15–16 August	Duang Go Round Concert	Impact Arena	
2026	27 September	Atlas: Rising Up Concert	Impact Arena	

== Awards and nominations ==
Award nominations for Wanpichit Nimitparkpoom
Year	Award	Category	Nominee(s)	Result	Ref.
2025	Nine Entertain Awards 2025	Rising Star Couple	with Suppakarn Jirachotikul	Nominated	
2025	Y Entertain Awards 2025	Rising Star Couple	with Suppakarn Jirachotikul	Nominated	
2026	Nine Entertain Awards 2026	Shining Star of the Year	with Suppakarn Jirachotikul	Nominated	
2026	Thailand Y Content Awards 2025	Best Couple of the Year	with Suppakarn Jirachotikul	Nominated	
2026	Thailand Y Content Awards 2025	Best Leading Actor	Duang with You	Nominated	
2026	Thailand Y Content Awards 2025	Popular Vote		Nominated	
2026	Thailand Y Content Awards 2025	Rising Star of the Year		Nominated	
2026	Nakarat Awards 2026	Popular Vote	with Suppakarn Jirachotikul	Won	
2026	Pattaya International Film Festival 2026	Power Couple	with Suppakarn Jirachotikul	Won	
2026	Y Entertain Awards 2026	Rising Star Couple	with Suppakarn Jirachotikul	Nominated	
2026	Praew Awards 2026	Rookie of the Year	with Suppakarn Jirachotikul	Won	
2026	Feed x Khaosod Awards 2026	Best Chemistry of the Year	with Suppakarn Jirachotikul	Nominated	
2026	Feed x Khaosod Awards 2026	Best Chemistry (Popular Vote)	with Suppakarn Jirachotikul	Nominated	
2026	Feed x Khaosod Awards 2026	Most Popular Male Actor (Popular Vote)	Duang with You	Nominated	
2026	Maya TV Awards 2026	Male Couple of the Year	with Suppakarn Jirachotikul	Nominated	
2026	Maya TV Awards 2026	Rising Star Male of the Year		Nominated	
2026	Howe Awards 2026	The Best Couple Award	with Suppakarn Jirachotikul	Nominated	
2026	Howe Awards 2026	Shining Male Award		Nominated	
2027	Kazz Awards 2027	Youth Choice of the Year (2nd place)		Won	
