= Thanaphum Sestasittikul =

Thai actor and singer (born 2002)

- ธนภูมิ เศรษฐสิทธิกุล
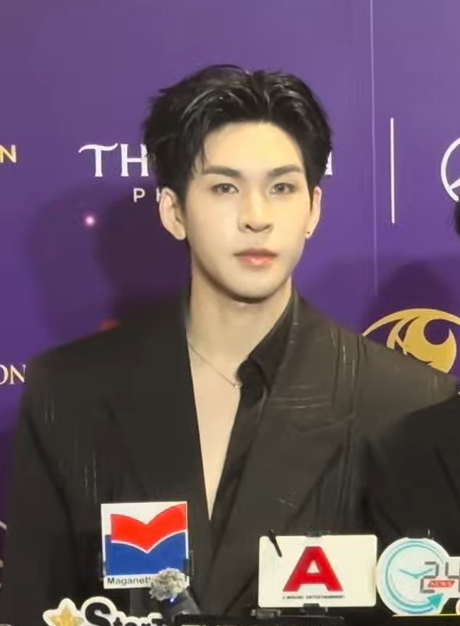
- Auau in 2026
- Born: 8 March 2002 (age 24); Pathum Thani, Thailand
- Other name: Auau (อู่อู๋)
- Education: Silpakorn University
- Occupations: Actor; singer
- Years active: 2020–present
- Agent: Domundi TV
- Known for: Real in Your Sky; Third in Mr. Fanboy
- Musical career
- Genres: Pop; T-pop
- Instrument: Vocals
- Labels: 4nologue; DMD Music
- Member of: DEXX
- Formerly of: DVI

Thanaphum Sestasittikul (Thai: ธนภูมิ เศรษฐสิทธิกุล; born 8 March 2002), nicknamed Auau (Thai: อู่อู๋), (Note: Thai pronunciation: [ʔuː˨˩.ʔuː˩˩˦]) is a Thai actor under Domundi TV and a member of the Thai boy band DEXX under DMD Music. He made an appearance auditioning on the singing competition The Star Idol, before participating on the survival show Laz Icon in 2021. He debuted as a member of the former boy group DVI under 4nologue in 2023.

He is known for his roles in Your Sky (2024), Your Sky of Us (2025), and Mr. Fanboy (2026).

== Early life and education ==
Thanaphum was born on 8 March 2002. His older sister, Chonlaphat Sestasittikul (EarnEarn), is a former singer and was a participant on The Voice Thailand season 6. Auau shared he became interested in acting while watching television series and he would sing and dance for his family, but he did not plan on entering the entertainment industry.

He graduated from high school at Saint Gabriel's College. He graduated with a Bachelor of Arts degree in Communication Arts, specializing in mass communications, from Silpakorn University in 2026.

== Career ==
=== 2021–2024: The Star Idol, Laz Icon, DVI ===
In 2021, Auau appeared on the singing competition The Star Idol on One 31. His mother had secretly submitted his application along with his sister's. He initially did not want to enter because he did not feel ready, but ultimately seized the opportunity. He trained with the help of his sister, reaching the first televised round where he was eliminated.

Auau went on to compete as an artist under Exact Scenario on the survival show Laz Icon, hosted by One 31 in collaboration with Lazada. After the end of the competition, Auau joined Suppakarn Jirachotikul (Por) to train under 4nologue.

Auau and Por were announced as members of the six-member boy group DVI (ดี-วาย di-wai). The group made its pre-debut at the Octopop music festival held at the Rajamangala National Stadium on 16 October 2022. DVI released their debut single "Sugar" on 30 January 2023. The group collaborated with the Japanese boy band Psychic Fever from Exile Tribe, releasing their single "To the Top" in February, and performing at the Battle of Tokyo: Code of Jr.Exile 5-day concert event, held at Saitama Super Arena on 21–23 July, and at Kyocera Dome Osaka on 29–30 July. The group released "Second Chance" in July and "เพื่อน (แอบ) รัก - Close(d) Friend" on 1 February 2024. DVI disbanded after 4nologue announced the decision to terminate the contracts of all members on 29 February 2024.

=== 2024–2025: Domundi, Your Sky, DEXX ===
Auau and his former DVI groupmate Por joined Domundi TV as members of DMD Gen 4. They then appeared on the reality show DMD Friendship the Reality, It Takes Two (2024). The show brought together DMD Gen 4 members to develop their skills, such as modelling, singing and acting, while in search for a compatible on-screen partner. Auau and Worapong Walor (Save) chose each other as partners. In the final episode, Auau received the Best Performance Award.

Auau made his acting debut as Real in Your Sky, which premiered on 17 November 2024. He starred alongside Save, who played his love interest Hia. Auau also performed on the soundtrack with his song "ฝากดาว (Entrust Stars)", released on 24 January 2025.

In June 2025, Domundi announced the formation of a six-member boy group named DEXX under DMD Music, consisting of James, Tutor, Yim, Auau, Por, and TeeTee. The group debuted with their first single "Clang Clang" on 24 June 2025.

=== 2026–present: Mr. Fanboy ===
On 25 April 2026, Auau and Save revealed their fandom mascot named "Mhii Praew". In June 2026, it was announced that Auau and Save would star in the upcoming series Friend Benefit, starring TeeTee and Por, and fellow members of DEXX.

Auau starred in his first lead role as Third in Mr. Fanboy, which premiered in August 2026. Auau also collaborated with SVRN and Heart of BUS, releasing their song "Fanboy" for the series soundtrack.

== Discography ==
=== Singles ===
==== As lead artist ====
Year	Title	Ref.
2026	"ไม่เล่น?" (Play with Me)	

==== Collaborations ====
Year	Title	Artist	Ref.
2021	"ที่หนึ่งในใจของเธอ (Last One)"	Laz Icon	
2023	"Sugar"	DVI	
2023	"To the Top" (feat. DVI)	Psychic Fever from Exile Tribe	
2023	"Second Chance"	DVI	
2024	"เพื่อน (แอบ) รัก - Close(d) Friend"	DVI	
2025	"Perfect Match"	DMD Gen 4	
2026	"My Bambi" (feat. AuAu)	Golf Pichaya	

==== Soundtrack appearances ====
Year	Title	Album	Ref.
2025	"ฝากดาว" (Entrust Stars)	Your Sky OST	
2026	"รักได้แล้ว (Next Status)" (with DEXX)	Duang with You OST	
2026	"Fanboy" (with SVRN, Heart (BUS))	Mr. Fanboy OST	
2026	"รับได้ใช่ไหม (Can You?)"	Mr. Fanboy OST	
2026	"Second Take" (with Savewrg)	Mr. Fanboy OST	

== Filmography ==
=== Television series ===
Year	Title	Role	Network	Notes	Ref.
2024	Your Sky	Real	One 31, iQIYI	Supporting role	
2025	Your Sky of Us	Real	One 31, iQIYI	Supporting role	
2026	ChermChey	Tonhon	TrueVisions Now	Supporting role	
2026	Mr. Fanboy	Third	One 31, iQIYI	Main role	
2026	The D Dorm	Don	One 31	Guest role (Ep. 6)	
TBA	Friend Benefit	Otd	TBA	Supporting role	

=== Television show ===
Year	Title	Network	Notes
2021	The Star Idol	One 31	
2021	Laz Icon	One 31	
2024	DMD Friendship the Reality, It Takes Two	One 31	
2025	คุณพระช่วย Khun Pra Chuay	Workpoint TV	26 January 2025
2025	โตมาเป็น Grow Up to Be	One Playground	Ep. 18
2025	Goodbye ตายไม่รู้ตัว	Workpoint TV	Ep. 25 (23 June 2025)
2025	T-Pop Stage	Workpoint TV	26 June 2025
2025	Thailand Music Countdown	Channel 3	Ep. 12 (3 August 2025)
2025	รอบวัน Rop Wan	One 31	16 October 2025
2026	T-Pop Stage	Workpoint TV	12 February 2026
2026	โตมาเป็น Grow Up to Be	Asok Montri	Ep. 24
2026	รอบวัน Rop Wan	One 31	25 February 2026
2026	แฉ Chae	GMM 25	17 September 2026
2026	ร้องให้เด็กมันดู Rong Hai Dek Man Du	Asok Montri	Ep. 1

=== Music video appearances ===
Year	Title	Artist	Ref.
2022	"Champagne Poppin"	Trinity	
2026	"จุ๊บเธอ (Jubu Jub)" (feat. DMD Boys)	DMD Cute Boys	
2026	"Red Wine"	Jetaime	

== Live performances ==
Year	Date	Name	Venue	Ref.
2022	16 October	Octopop 2022	Rajamangala National Stadium	
2023	5 February	Ballistik Boys vs Psychic Fever The Survival 2023 Thailand	CentralWorld Live	
2023	26 June	Psychic Fever Live Tour 2023: P.C.F	Zepp Haneda	
2023	21–23 July	Battle of Tokyo: Code of Jr.Exile	Saitama Super Arena	
2023	29–30 July	Battle of Tokyo: Code of Jr.Exile	Kyocera Dome Osaka	
2023	17 September	Trinity Breath of Desire Concert	Impact Arena	
2023	21 October	Octopop 2023	Thunderdome Stadium	
2024	19 December	DMD Charity 2024	Taco Bell, Samyan Mitrtown	
2025	30 August	DMD Sport Day	BITEC Live	
2025	4 December	DMD Charity 2025	Siam Square Block K	
2026	23 March	DMD World in Japan: Start to Bloom	Toyosu PIT, Tokyo	
2026	2–3 May	DMD Land 3: The Final Land	Impact Arena	
2026	1 August	DMD Sport Day 2026: High School Vibes	Indoor Stadium Huamark	
2026	15–16 August	Duang Go Round Concert	Impact Arena	

== Awards and nominations ==
Award nominations for Thanaphum Sestasittikul
Year	Award	Category	Nominee(s)	Result	Ref.
2025	Nine Entertain Awards 2025	Rising Star Couple	with Worapong Walor	Nominated	
2025	Y Entertain Awards 2025	Rising Star Couple	with Worapong Walor	Nominated	
2026	Nine Entertain Awards 2026	Shining Star of the Year	with Worapong Walor	Nominated	
2026	The Viral Hits Love Moment Awards 2026	BL Supporting Duo (People's Choice Award)	with Worapong Walor	Won	
2026	The Viral Hits Love Moment Awards 2026	People's Choice Rising Star Artist Award		Won	
2026	Howe Awards 2026	Rising Icon Award		Won	
