= Worapong Walor =

Thai actor (born 2003)

- วรพงษ์ วาเลาะ
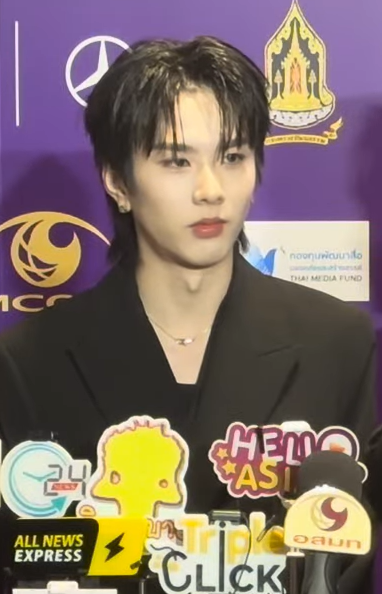
- Save in 2026
- Born: 27 June 2003 (age 23); Bangkok, Thailand
- Other name: Save (เซฟ)
- Education: Bangkok University
- Occupation: Actor
- Years active: 2024–present
- Agent: Domundi TV
- Known for: Hia in Your Sky; Wan in Mr. Fanboy

Worapong Walor (Thai: วรพงษ์ วาเลาะ; born 27 June 2003), nicknamed Save (Thai: เซฟ), is a Thai actor under Domundi TV. He is known for his roles in the series Your Sky (2024), Your Sky of Us (2025), and Mr. Fanboy (2026).

== Early life and education ==
Worapong was born in Bangkok. After his parents separated when he was young, he was raised by his grandparents, alongside his brother who is 3 years younger.

His family owned lots for rent at the Chatuchak Weekend Market, but ran into financial difficulties during the COVID-19 pandemic. In order to make money, he began selling in-game currency and items. He also learned how to code to set up and run a private game server by watching videos on YouTube. He later attended casting calls for commercials and series, and created content on TikTok.

He attended Matthayom Wat Nongkhaem School in Nong Khaem district. He was scouted to join the entertainment industry during his first year studying computer engineering at Kasetsart University, Kamphaeng Saen campus. He decided to transfer schools in order to be closer to the job opportunities. He is currently pursuing a Bachelor of Communication Arts program in Communications and New Media at Bangkok University.

== Career ==
Save made his acting debut in a guest role as Spark in the series Addicted Heroin (2024).

Save was contacted by Domundi TV director Kittipat Jampa (Aof) to join DMD Gen 3, but at the time he had signed to another company for about a year. Save later joined Domundi TV as a member of DMD Gen 4. He then appeared on the reality show DMD Friendship the Reality, It Takes Two (2024). The show brought together DMD Gen 4 members to develop their skills, such as modelling, singing and acting, while in search for a compatible on-screen partner. Save and Thanaphum Sestasittikul (Auau) chose each other as partners.

Save appeared in Your Sky (2024) as Hia, the love interest of Real, played by Auau. He later reprised his role as Hia in the special Your Sky of Us (2025).

On 25 April 2026, Auau and Save revealed their fandom mascot named "Mhii Praew". In June 2026, it was announced that Auau and Save would star in the upcoming series Friend Benefit, starring TeeTee and Por, and members of DEXX.

Save starred in his first lead role as Wan in Mr. Fanboy, which premiered in August 2026. He also performed on the soundtrack with his first solo single "เลิกเล่นครับผม (Eyes on Me)".

== Discography ==
=== Singles ===
==== Collaborations ====
| Year | Title | Artist | Ref. |
|---|---|---|---|
| 2025 | "Perfect Match" | DMD Gen 4 | |
| 2026 | "จุ๊บเธอ (Jubu Jub)" (feat. DMD Boys) | DMD Cute Boys | |

==== Soundtrack appearances ====
| Year | Title | Album | Ref. |
|---|---|---|---|
| 2026 | "เลิกเล่นครับผม (Eyes on Me)" | Mr. Fanboy OST | |
| 2026 | "Second Take" (with AuAu) | Mr. Fanboy OST | |

== Filmography ==
=== Television series ===
| Year | Title | Role | Network | Notes | Ref. |
|---|---|---|---|---|---|
| 2024 | Addicted Heroin | Spark | WeTV | Guest role | |
| 2024 | Your Sky | "Hia" Pawee Sae-song | One 31, iQIYI | Supporting role | |
| 2025 | Your Sky of Us | "Hia" Pawee Sae-song | One 31, iQIYI | Supporting role | |
| 2026 | ChermChey | Chonlatee | TrueVisions Now | Supporting role | |
| 2026 | Mr. Fanboy | Wan | One 31, iQIYI | Main role | |
| 2026 | The D Dorm | Dope | One 31 | Guest role (Ep. 5) | |
| TBA | Friend Benefit | Ozone | — | Supporting role | |

=== Television show ===
| Year | Title | Network | Notes |
|---|---|---|---|
| 2024 | DMD Friendship the Reality, It Takes Two | One 31 | Regular member |
| 2025 | คุณพระช่วย Khun Pra Chuay | Workpoint TV | 26 January 2025 |
| 2025 | โตมาเป็น Grow Up to Be | One Playground | Ep. 18 |
| 2025 | Goodbye ตายไม่รู้ตัว | Workpoint TV | Ep. 25 (23 June 2025) |
| 2026 | แฉ Chae | GMM 25 | 17 September 2026 |
| 2026 | ร้องให้เด็กมันดู Rong Hai Dek Man Du | Asok Montri | Ep. 1 |

=== Music video appearances ===
| Year | Title | Artist(s) | Ref. |
|---|---|---|---|
| 2024 | "ฝากดาว" | Auau | |

== Live performances ==
| Year | Date | Name | Venue | Ref. |
|---|---|---|---|---|
| 2025 | 30 August | DMD Sport Day | BITEC Live | |
| 2026 | 23 March | DMD World in Japan: Start to Bloom | Toyosu PIT, Tokyo | |
| 2026 | 2–3 May | DMD Land 3: The Final Land | Impact Arena | |
| 2026 | 1 August | DMD Sport Day 2026: High School Vibes | Indoor Stadium Huamark | |

== Awards and nominations ==
Award nominations for Worapong Walor
| Year | Award | Category | Nominee(s) | Result | Ref. |
|---|---|---|---|---|---|
| 2025 | Nine Entertain Awards 2025 | Rising Star Couple | with Thanaphum Sestasittikul | Nominated | |
| 2025 | Y Entertain Awards 2025 | Rising Star Couple | with Thanaphum Sestasittikul | Nominated | |
| 2026 | Nine Entertain Awards 2026 | Shining Star of the Year | with Thanaphum Sestasittikul | Nominated | |
| 2026 | The Viral Hits Love Moment Awards 2026 | BL Supporting Duo (People's Choice Award) | with Thanaphum Sestasittikul | Won | |
| 2026 | Howe Awards 2026 | Rising Icon Award | | Won | |
| 2027 | Kazz Awards 2027 | Youth Choice of the Year (5th place) | | Won | |
