= Mr. Fanboy =

2026 Thai television series

- Official series poster
- Thai: รักสุดใจนายแฟนบอย
- Genre: Romantic drama; Boys' love
- Based on: Mr. Fanboy #รักสุดใจนายแฟนบอย by Littlebbear96
- Written by: Dearest; Nithran Sisangngam
- Directed by: Nathawat Piyanonpong
- Starring: Thanaphum Sestasittikul; Worapong Walor; Supamongkon Wongwisut
- Music by: Hualampong Riddim
- Opening theme: "Fanboy" by AuAu, SVRN, Heart (BUS); "Second Take" by AuAu, Savewrg (Ep. 12)
- Ending theme: "No Pain No Gain" by Perses (Ep. 1–2, 6–7, 10); "Fanboy" by AuAu, SVRN, Heart (BUS) (Ep. 3, 5, 12); "Eyes on Me (เลิกเล่นครับผม)" by Savewrg (Ep. 4); "Safe Zone (เพลงจูบ)" by Tle Matimun (Ep. 8); "Time To Say Goodbye (หมดเวลารัก)" (Instrumental) by Por Suppakarn (Ep. 9); "No Matter (แลก)" by JamesSu (Ep. 11)
- Country of origin: Thailand
- Original language: Thai
- No. of episodes: 12

Production
- Executive producer: Kittipat Champa
- Producer: Nawaphon Natewong
- Cinematography: Nattheerith Boonsaen; Witsarut Natekeng; Chutipong Yimchalaem
- Running time: 49–73 minutes
- Production company: Domundi TV

Original release
- Network: One 31; iQIYI
- Release: 29 August – 14 November 2026

Mr. Fanboy (Thai: รักสุดใจนายแฟนบอย; RTGS: Rak Sut Chai Nai Faenboi; lit. 'Love Wholeheartedly Mr. Fanboy') is a 2026 Thai romantic drama boys' love television series, starring Thanaphum Sestasittikul (Auau), Worapong Walor (Save), and Supamongkon Wongwisut (James), based on the novel Mr. Fanboy #รักสุดใจนายแฟนบอย by Littlebbear96, produced by Domundi TV.

The series premiered on One 31 on 29 August 2026, airing on Saturdays at 22:30 ICT. The uncut version was made available for streaming at 23:30 ICT on iQIYI. The series was also made available for streaming at 23:30 ICT through the Mandee Channel on YouTube for select authorized regions. Episodes 6 to 12 were rescheduled to air fifteen minutes earlier, airing at 22:15 ICT and 23:15 ICT on One 31 and iQIYI, respectively. The series concluded on 14 November 2026.

== Synopsis ==
Wan (Worapong Walor) is a devoted fanboy of the emerging actor Nine (Supamongkon Wongwisut). While in his final semester of university studying public relations, he also works as a freelance photographer, capturing actors at fan events.

During the line up event announcing Nine's new series, The Deep Between Us, Wan finds a spot to unbox his merch in a restricted area, where he gets caught by Nine's sharp-tongued co-star Third (Thanaphum Sestasittikul). Wan is accused of being a stalker fan and tries to flee, but accidentally enters the actors' dressing room. Escorted out by security, his friend Jay (Nattanan Chindanon) comes to his rescue.

Wan learns his mother (Sujira Arunpipat) has fallen for a voice phishing scam, putting the family into financial debt. Wan finds himself entering the entertainment industry out of necessity. Despite his lack of acting experience, Wan is unexpectedly cast in a supporting role for The Deep Between Us after a fiery improvised audition opposite Third.

Third is left unimpressed when Wan shows up to his first day of acting lessons late and unprepared. Although they initially clash, the two gradually form a deeper connection as they see each other in a new light. Wan begins to discover the reality behind the scenes and must use every skill he possesses to survive in this industry.

== Cast and characters ==
=== Main ===
- Thanaphum Sestasittikul (Auau) as Tharit Charatdecha (Third)
- Worapong Walor (Save) as Ashawin Kosonkasem (Wan)
- Supamongkon Wongwisut (James) as Nopphanat Wongwiboon (Nine)
- Tinnapat Tusnytraitep (Ryujin) as Jiraphat (Renji)
- Chirachart Buspavanich (Patji) as Chonnakan (Time)
- Puntita Boonchuan (Punch) as Achiraya (View)
- Witsarut Himmarat (Most) as North
- Kittiphak Thong-uam (Title) as Wut
- Charukitt Srisawat (Judy) as Pitch
- Nichaphat Chatchaipholrat (Pearwah) as Cher
- Mueankwan Yujarern (Ker) as Sunny
- Nattanan Chindanon (Nan) as Jay

=== Supporting ===
- Chawarin Perdpiriyawong (NuNew) as Juno
- Pruk Panich (Zee) as Thee
- Panadda Wongphudee (Boom) as Third's mother
- Sujira Arunpipat (Nui) as Wan's mother
- Baromvudh Hiranyasthiti (Mick) as Wan's father
- Sukhapat Lohwacharin (Suam) as Pai
- Wisarut Homhuan (Blahboom) as Luang
- Karint Aongchum (Cartoon) as Susan
- Worawat Boonchuen (Nont) as Rin
- Patipan Khoonangeun (Mos) as Toto
- Tharathep Thaweephon as Jasmine
- Priya Sangkhachinda (Pam) as Pla
- Niti Iam-amonniphit (James) as Jern

=== Guest ===
- Ratchapong Anomakiti (Poppy) as Host
- Wanpichit Nimitparkpoom (TeeTee) as himself (Ep. 1)
- Suppakarn Jirachotikul (Por) as himself (Ep. 1)
- Teetut Chungmanirat (Thomas) as Boom (Ep. 1–2)
- Kongpob Jirojmontri (Kong) as himself (Ep. 1)
- Thirati Eksathian (Thee) as himself (Ep. 1)
- Thanaphat Tansakul (Wave) as himself (Ep. 1)
- Chatchapon Pranotphong (North) as himself (Ep. 1)
- Sorranan Suksawat (Otto) as himself (Ep. 1)
- Saran Anantasetthakul (Ton) as himself (Ep. 1)
- Nathawat Piyanonpong (Kla) as Aof (Ep. 6)
- Phirunwat Promrat (Pung) as himself (Ep. 12)

== Soundtrack ==
Mr. Fanboy Soundtrack
No.	Title	Writer(s)	Artist	Length
1.	"No Pain No Gain"	Noth (Getsunova)	Perses	3:36
2.	"Fanboy"	Amp Achariya Dulyapaiboon	AuAu; SVRN; Heart (BUS)	2:27
3.	"Eyes on Me (เลิกเล่นครับผม)"	Marc Tatchapon	Savewrg	2:16
4.	"Safe Zone (เพลงจูบ)"	Marc Tatchapon; JBank	Tle Matimun	2:43
5.	"Can You? (รับได้ใช่ไหม)"	Thunwa Natethai; Narit Pensuklua; VibeUps Team	AuAu	4:02
6.	"Fan Krub (แฟนครับ)"	Amp Achariya Dulyapaiboon	Thai (BUS)	3:54
7.	"Time To Say Goodbye (หมดเวลารัก)"	Amp Achariya Dulyapaiboon	Por Suppakarn	2:54
8.	"No Matter (แลก)"	Marc Tatchapon	JamesSu	3:12
9.	"Second Take"	Thunwa Natethai	AuAu; Savewrg	3:00

== Production ==
The series was announced in February 2025 during the DMD Line Up 2025+ "Glow Up" event organized by Domundi TV at Siam Paragon in Bangkok. A 14-minute pilot was screened at the event. The series was announced as part of the iQIYI iJOY TH 2026 lineup at the Sphere Hall, EmSphere on 7 November 2025.

Production began in February 2026. Principal photography began on 20 February 2026 and concluded on 22 September 2026.

== Marketing ==
The series was promoted with the Fanboy Gala Night Ep. 1 premiere screening event, held at CentralWorld Live on 29 August 2026. The event featured performances by the cast, along with the T-pop group Perses. The event also featured a conversation about the series with the cast, the director and the executive producer, as well as a premiere screening of the first episode, which allowed fans to watch together with the cast and other actors from Domundi TV.

Mr. Fanboy busking event was held at the Amphitheatres, One Bangkok Park on 13 September 2026. The sixth episode was promoted with the Battleground Mr. Fanboy screening event, held at MGI Hall, Bravo BKK on 3 October 2026. Following the release of the seventh episode, the cast held a busking event at CentralWorld on 11 October 2026. Halfway Mr. Fanboy Screening Ep. 8 event was held at MGI Hall, Bravo BKK on 17 October 2026. The screening event for the ninth episode was held at MCC Hall, The Mall Lifestore Bangkae on 24 October 2026. A screening event for the tenth episode was held at Siam Pavalai, Siam Paragon on 31 October 2026. A screening event for the eleventh episode was held at SF World Cinema, CentralWorld on 7 November 2026.

The final episode was promoted with the Mr. Fanboy Final Episode Welcome Back event held at the Impact Exhibition Center on 14 November 2026.

== Awards and nominations ==
Award nominations for Mr. Fanboy
Year	Award	Category	Nominee(s)	Result	Ref.
2027	Kazz Awards 2027	Youth Choice of the Year	Worapong Walor (5th place)	Won	
