= Your Sky =

2024–25 Thai television series

- Official series poster
- Thai: กี่หมื่นฟ้า
- Genre: Romantic drama; Boys' love; School drama
- Based on: Your Sky by 25.15.66.
- Written by: Wanna Kothanyawat; Wannapa Lertkultanon; Sereneraphat Pareyarpatsirene
- Directed by: Nathawat Piyanonpong
- Starring: Teetut Chungmanirat; Kongpob Jirojmontri
- Opening theme: "ที่รักครับ (Only One)" by Atlas
- Country of origin: Thailand
- Original language: Thai
- No. of episodes: 12

Production
- Producer: Kittipat Jampa
- Cinematography: Nitiwat Samunlor; Nattheerith Boonsaen
- Running time: 45–70 minutes
- Production company: Domundi TV

Original release
- Network: One 31; iQIYI
- Release: 17 November 2024 – 2 February 2025

Your Sky (Thai: กี่หมื่นฟ้า; RTGS: Gi Muen Fa) is a 2024–2025 Thai boys' love romantic drama television series, starring Teetut Chungmanirat (Thomas) and Kongpob Jirojmontri (Kong). The series is based on the novel of the same name by author 25.15.66.

Directed by Nathawat Piyanonpong (Kla) and produced by Domundi TV, the series premiered on 17 November 2024, airing on Sundays on One 31 at 22:15 ICT. The uncut version was made available for streaming at 23:15 ICT on iQIYI. The series concluded on 2 February 2025.

A three-episode special titled Your Sky of Us premiered on 29 March 2025.

== Synopsis ==
Teerak (Kongpob Jirojmontri) is a cheerful and friendly university student who struggles to say no. Even though he is uncomfortable being pursued by his senior Oh (Chinnarat Siriphongchawalit), he worries it would hurt Oh's feelings if he rejects him.

Teerak agrees to attend Oh's birthday event at a bar, believing that if he goes, Oh would stop bothering him. At the party, Oh tricks Teerak into getting drunk on cocktail shots by claiming they were non-alcoholic. Taking advantage of his drunken state, Oh asks Teerak to become his boyfriend and tries to kiss him on his cheek against his will. Fortunately, Teerak is rescued by Muenfah (Teetut Chungmanirat), the owner of the bar and older brother of Teerak's friend Punlee (Suppakarn Jirachotikul), when Muenfah intervenes and claims to be his boyfriend.

The next day, rumours of their relationship spread across campus. Teerak and Muenfah agree to pretend to be a couple to ward off Oh's unwanted pursuit. As time passes, their fake relationship begins to feel increasingly real.

== Cast and characters ==
=== Main ===
- Teetut Chungmanirat (Thomas) as Pradiphat Phisut (Muenfah)
- Kongpob Jirojmontri (Kong) as Rak Niran (Teerak)

=== Supporting ===
- Thanaphum Sestasittikul (Auau) as Prarchana Phanha (Real)
- Worapong Walor (Save) as Pawee Saesong (Hia)
- Suppakarn Jirachotikul (Por) as Sasin Phisut (Punlee)
- Wanpichit Nimitparkpoom (TeeTee) as Ghlaijai Borirat
- Chirachart Buspavanich (Patji) as Thikhayu Rungprasertsin (Type)
- Inthira Sae-sieo (In) as Jiranan Phantrakul (Joy)
- Chinnarat Siriphongchawalit (Mike) as Atthiphong Wongnithi (Oh)
- Morakot Liu (Tonliu) as Phafun Niran (Babe)
- Piamchon Damrongsunthornchai (Tonnam) as Nawin Theeraaksorn (Dom)

=== Guest ===
- Sanya Kunakorn (Duu) as Teerak's father
- Sopidnapa Chumpani (Jeab) as Teerak's mother
- Chakkrit Wangpattanasirikul as Teerak's grandfather
- Phol Tantasathien as Muenfah's father
- Naruemon Phongsupap (Koy) as Muenfah's mother
- Duangjai Hiransri (Pure) as Oh's mother
- Yosita Wasuphiruk (Yogurt) as Mew (Ep. 4)

== Soundtrack ==
Your Sky Original Soundtrack
No.	Title	Writer(s)	Artist	Length
1.	"Only One" (ที่รักครับ)	Amp Achariya Dulyapaiboon	Atlas	3:02
2.	"Fall and Fall in Love" (กี่หมื่นครั้งที่ตกหลุมรักคนเดิม)	Amp Achariya Dulyapaiboon	Marckris (BUS)	3:23
3.	"How Many Million Stars" (กี่ล้านดวงดาว)	Cake (Serious Bacon)	Serious Bacon	3:48
4.	"Entrust Stars" (ฝากดาว)	Amp Achariya Dulyapaiboon	AuAu	3:24
5.	"Close to the Heart" (ใกล้ใจ)	Amp Achariya Dulyapaiboon	Por Suppakarn	3:40
6.	"Overflowing Heart" (ล้นใจ)	Copter	JJ Radchapon	4:23
7.	"In a Relationship" (เป็นแฟนฉันแล้วนะ)	Amp Achariya Dulyapaiboon; Prateep Siri-issaranan	Thomas; Kong	3:12

== Marketing ==
The series was promoted with a premiere screening of the first episode with the cast in attendance, held at SF World Cinema, CentralWorld on 9 November 2024.

The cast also performed at the Your Sky Busking event was held at Siam Walking Street Zone, Siam Square on 22 November 2024. Your Sky Series 2nd Busking event was held in front of Thephasadin Stadium on 18 January 2025.

The final episode was promoted with the Your Sky Final Ep. screening event held at Siam Pavalai Theatre on 2 February 2025.

=== Fan meetings ===
Year	Date	Event	Venue	Ref.
2025	6 April	What's on Your Sky? Your Sky Fanmeet	Idea Live, Bravo BKK	
2025	31 May	What's on Your Sky? Your Sky Fanmeet in Hong Kong	Regal Airport Hotel, Hong Kong	
2025	6 July	What's on Your Sky? Your Sky Fanmeet in Japan	EBiS303, Shibuya	
2025	12 July	What's on Your Sky? Your Sky Fanmeet in Manila	Samsung Hall, SM Aura Premier	
2025	6 September	What's on Your Sky? Your Sky Fanmeet in Seoul	Guro Community Center, Seoul	

== Adaptation ==
Tokyo MX announced the Japanese adaptation Your Sky: Hare Nochi Koi (ハレのち恋), starring Isshin Aihara (One Love One Heart) and Ayuta Fukuda (DXTeen), which premiered on 2 August 2026. Thomas and Kong attended as special guests at the Your Sky: Hare Nochi Koi special premiere event held at Tokyo Big Sight on 5 July 2026. Thomas and Kong also made a guest appearance in episode 7 of the adaptation.

== Accolades ==
Name of award ceremony, year presented, award category, nominee of award, and result of nomination
Award	Year	Category	Nominee/work	Result	Ref.
Asia Top Awards	2024	Hottest BL Series of the Year	Your Sky	Won	
Bangkok Pride Awards	2026	Pride Popular of Y Series Star	Teetut Chungmanirat and Kongpob Jirojmontri	Nominated	
Feed x Khaosod Awards	2025	Best Original Soundtrack of the Year	"Only One"	Nominated	
Howe Awards	2025	Hottest Series Award	Your Sky of Us	Nominated	
Howe Awards	2025	Best Couple Award	Teetut Chungmanirat and Kongpob Jirojmontri	Nominated	
Howe Awards	2025	Shining Male Award	Kongpob Jirojmontri	Nominated	
Maya Superstar Idol Awards	2026	Popular Male Couple of the Year	Teetut Chungmanirat and Kongpob Jirojmontri	Nominated	
Nine Entertain Awards	2025	Couple of the Year	Teetut Chungmanirat and Kongpob Jirojmontri	Nominated	
Sanook Top of the Year Awards	2025	Rising Male Couple	Teetut Chungmanirat and Kongpob Jirojmontri	Nominated	
Thailand Y Content Awards	2024	Best Series	Your Sky	Nominated	
Thailand Y Content Awards	2024	Best Cinematography	Your Sky	Nominated	
Thailand Y Content Awards	2024	Best Director	Nathawat Piyanonpong	Nominated	
Thailand Y Content Awards	2024	Best Series Soundtrack	"ที่รักครับ (Only One)"	Nominated	
Thailand Y Content Awards	2024	Best Image Sequence Award	Your Sky	Won	
The Viral Hits Asian Soft Power Awards	2025	Best Asian Series Award	Your Sky	Won	
The Viral Hits Awards	2025	Best BL Couple of the Year	Teetut Chungmanirat and Kongpob Jirojmontri	Won	
The Viral Hits Awards	2025	Best BL Series of the Year	Your Sky	Nominated	
The Viral Hits Awards	2025	Best Newcomer of the Year	Kongpob Jirojmontri	Nominated	
Y Entertain Awards	2025	Prince of Boys' Love	Kongpob Jirojmontri	Nominated	
Y Entertain Awards	2025	Rising Star Couple	Teetut Chungmanirat and Kongpob Jirojmontri	Nominated	
Y Entertain Awards	2025	Rising Star Couple	Suppakarn Jirachotikul and Wanpichit Nimitparkpoom	Nominated	
Y Universe Awards	2025	The Best Y Series	Your Sky	Nominated	
Y Universe Awards	2025	The Best BL Series	Your Sky	Nominated	
Y Universe Awards	2025	The Best Couple	Teetut Chungmanirat and Kongpob Jirojmontri	Nominated	
Y Universe Awards	2025	The Best Leading Role	Teetut Chungmanirat	Nominated	
Y Universe Awards	2025	The Best Leading Role	Kongpob Jirojmontri	Nominated	
Y Universe Awards	2025	The Best Cuties	Kongpob Jirojmontri	Nominated	
Y Universe Awards	2025	Best Ensemble Cast	Your Sky	Nominated	
Y Universe Awards	2025	Best Original Song for a Series	"Only One"	Nominated	
Y Universe Awards	2025	The Best Series OST.	"Only One"	Nominated	
Y Universe Awards	2025	Best Partner	Teetut Chungmanirat and Kongpob Jirojmontri	Nominated	
Y Universe Awards	2025	Rising Star	Teetut Chungmanirat	Nominated	
Y Universe Awards	2025	Rising Star	Kongpob Jirojmontri	Nominated	
