= Scrubb (band) =

Thai band

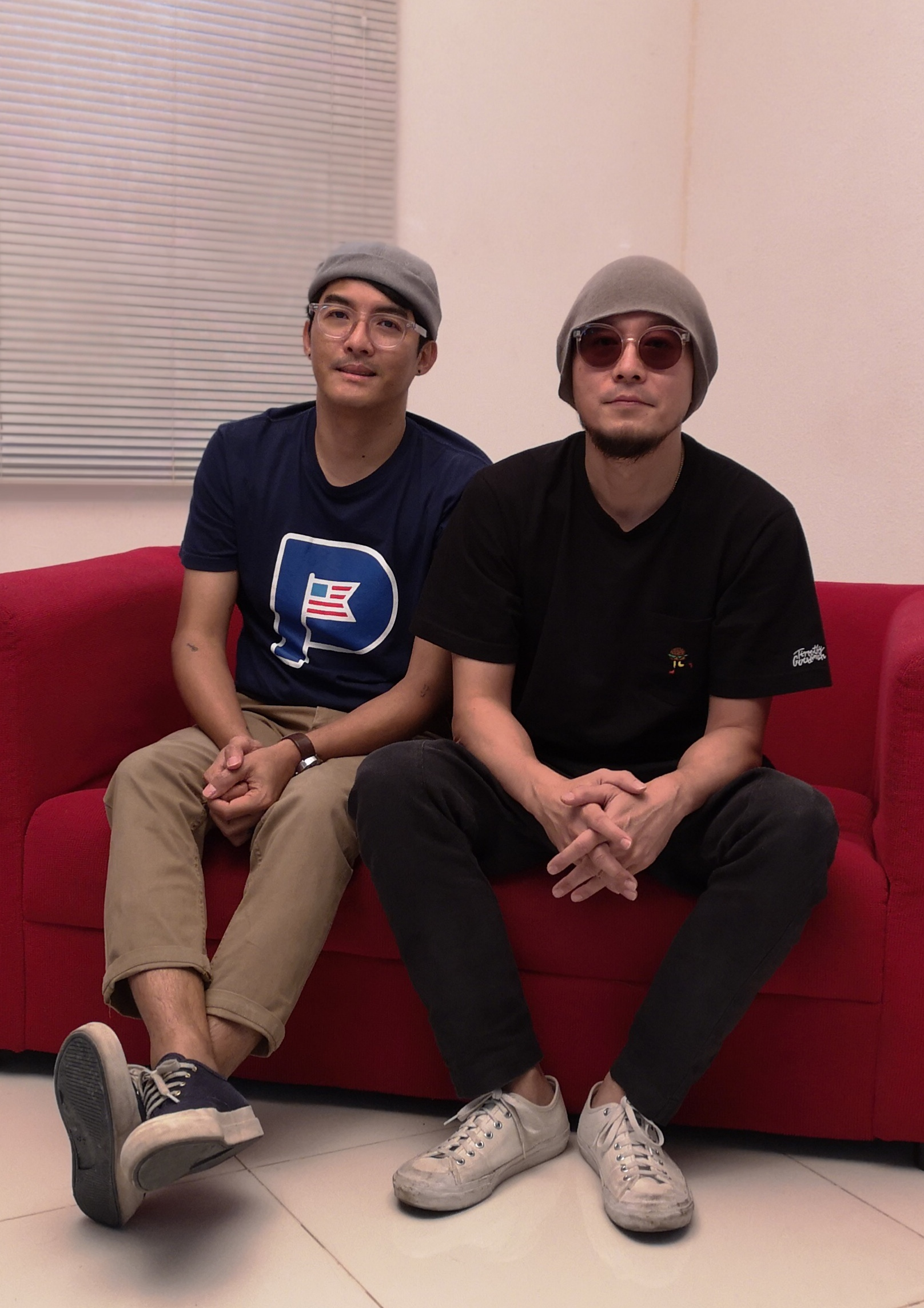

Background information
- Origin: Bangkok, Thailand
- Genres: Britpop; Chill-out music; Indie pop
- Years active: 2000–present
- Label: Black Sheep (2002–2011); BEC-TERO (2011–2019); Independent (2020–present)
- Members: Thawatpon Wongboonsiri; Torpong Chantabubpha

Scrubb (Thai: สครับบ์) is a Thai musical duo composed of Thawatpon Wongboonsiri and Torpong Chantabubpha. The band has been known for their popular hits such as ทุกอย่าง (Everything) (2003), ใกล้ (Close) (2005), คู่กัน (Together) (2005), เข้ากันดี (Click) (2007) and รอยยิ้ม (Smile) (2013).

== History ==
Scrubb was formed by Silpakorn University students namely Thawatpon Wongboonsiri (Muey), a freshman from Bangkok and Torpong Chantabubpha (Ball), a senior from Nakhon Pathom. Both music lovers and studying in the Faculty of Education, they used to be members of the university's International Music Group. Thawatpon is the lead singer and works with the lyrics while Torpong is on the rhythmic part.

As they graduated from university, they produced their own music and sold it to different record shops, promoted on websites and sent their demos to different record labels in Thailand. When their music reached Yutthana Boonaom (Ted), a director at Fat Radio, it was played on air and they eventually got an opportunity to perform for free at the Fat Festival. They went on and signed with Black Sheep Records where they released their first album SSS..S..S in 2003.

The band later signed with BEC-TERO in 2011 but did not renew their contract when it expired last 2019.

The band was also featured in 2gether: The Series in 2020, where it was the favourite band of protagonist Tine Teepakorn.

== Discography ==
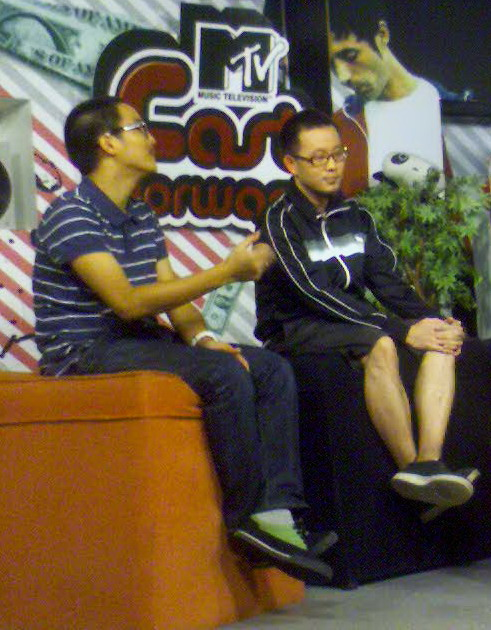
Scrubb at MTV Fast Forward in 2008

=== Studio albums ===
Title	Details
Sound About	Year: 2000; Label: Independent; Tracklist: 1. "4 คอร์ด (4 Chords)"; 2. "Scrubb"; 3. "กอดหมอน (Hug Pillow)"; 4. "ขอ (Ask)"; 5. "ตื่น (Get Up)"; 6. "ทุกอย่าง (Everything)"; 7. "ปล่อย (Release)"; 8. "ฝันร้าย (Nightmare)"; 9. "ลักษณะนาม (Noun)"
SSS..S..S	Year: 2003; Label: Black Sheep; Tracklist: 1. "เธอ (You)"; 2. "Art Bar"; 3. "ลอย (Float)"; 4. "ฝืน (Forced)"; 5. "เก็บมันเอาไว้ (Keep It)"; 6. "โรงเรียน (โรงเลียน) (School)"; 7. "ทุกอย่าง (Everything)"; 8. "กลัว (Fear)"; 9. "พอ (Stop)"; 10. "มอง (Look)"; 11. "A Day"; 12. "ชูบีดูบีดับ (Chubu Dububab)"
Club	Year: 2005; Label: Black Sheep, Sony BMG; Tracklist: 1. "เวลา (Time)"; 2. "ใกล้ (Close)"; 3. "เพลงก่อนนอน (Song Before Bed)"; 4. "See Scape"; 5. "ลืม (Forget)"; 6. "คู่กัน (Together)"; 7. "ขอ (Only You)"; 8. "ลองคิดดู (Think About It)"; 9. "ผ่านไปแล้ว (Passed)"; 10. "วันศุกร์ (Friday)"; 11. "รักกันหนอ (Love Each Other)"; 12. "วันเกิด (Birthday)"
Kid	Year: 2010; Label: Black Sheep, Sony Music; Tracklist: 1. "คำตอบ (Answer)"; 2. "พร้อม (Ready)"; 3. "รอยต่อ (Seam)"; 4. "สุขใจ (Kid Edited)"; 5. "วันเหล่านั้น (Those Days)"; 6. "หนี (Escape)"; 7. "ฉันก็เป็นเหมือนใครคนหนึ่ง (I Am Like Someone)"; 8. "คนนี้ (This Person)"; 9. "ลมเบาๆ (Gentle Wind)"; 10. "คิด (Think)"
Clean	Year: 2013; Label: BEC-TERO; Tracklist: 1. "Good Morning"; 2. "เข้าใจ (Understand)" (feat. Singto Numchok); 3. "ลาลา (Lala)"; 4. "รอยยิ้ม (Smile)"; 5. "ลึกลึก (Deep)"; 6. "ฟ้าครึ้ม ๆ (Cloudy Sky)"; 7. "สุดสัปดาห์ (Weekend)"; 8. "ลม (Wind)"; 9. "เช้า (Chao)"; 10. "เพลงนั้นยังอยู่ (That Song Is Still Here)"; 11. "ได้ยินไหม (Can You Hear)" (feat. Yaak Lab); 12. "The Picnic Song"; 13. "รักนิรันดร์ (Eternal Love)"
Season	Year: 2018; Label: BEC-TERO; Tracklist: 1. "Intro Summer"; 2. "ดวงตะวัน (Sunny Day)" (feat. Win Siriwong); 3. "ซ่อน (Hide & Seek)"; 4. "ละคร (Tales)"; 5. "ฝน (Rain)"; 6. "ทิ้งตัว (Universe)"; 7. "ม้าหมุน (Afternoon)"; 8. "รู้สึก (Diary)"; 9. "ทุกวัน (If)"; 10. "Outtro Ice"; 11. "ยังอยู่ (Wind)"; 12. "ฤดู (Season)"

=== Extended plays ===
Title	Details
Mood	Year: 2007; Label: Sony BMG; Tracklist: 1. "เข้ากันดี"; 2. "ย้อนเวลา"; 3. "เก็บไว้กับเธอ (Keep It With You)"; 4. "ฟ้า (Be The Same)"; 5. "Inchan Tree"

=== Compilation albums ===
Title	Details
Your Ears	Year: 2007; Label: Sony BMG
ชุดเล็ก (Lite)	Year: 2008; Label: Sony BMG

=== Singles ===
==== Main artist ====
Year	Title	English Title	Album
2003	"เธอ"	You	SSS..S..S
2003	"ทุกอย่าง"	Everything	SSS..S..S
2004	See Scape		Club
2005	"ใกล้"	Close	Club
2005	"คู่กัน"	Together	Club
2007	"เข้ากันดี"	Click	Mood
2007	"ย้อนเวลา"	Go Back In Time	Mood
2007	"ยังอยากรู้"	Still Curious	Your Ears
2008	"เธอหมุนรอบฉัน ฉันหมุนรอบเธอ" (Original by Chaliang)	You Revolve Around Me, I Revolve Around You	ชุดเล็ก (Lite)
2008	"ให้เธอ"	For You	ชุดเล็ก (Lite)
2010	"คำตอบ"	Answer	Kid
2010	"คนนี้"	This Person	Kid
2010	"รอยต่อ"	Seam	Kid
2010	"คิด"	Think	Kid
2010	"รักที่เพิ่งผ่านพ้นไป"	Love That Just Passed Away	Non-album single
2010	"สุดสัปดาห์"	Weekend	Clean
2012	"เช้า"	Morning	Clean
2012	"รักนิรันดร์"	Eternal Love	Clean
2013	"ลึกลึก"	Deep	Clean
2013	"ลม"	Wind	Clean
2014	"รอยยิ้ม"	Smile	Clean
2014	"เข้าใจ" (feat. Singto Numchok)	Understand	Clean
2014	"ลาลา"	Lala	Clean
2015	"เพลงนั้นยังอยู่"	That Song Is Still Here	Clean
2016	"ฝน"	Rain	Season
2017	"ทุกวัน"	If	Season
2017	"รู้สึก"	Diary	Season
2019	"ยังจำได้ไหม"	Remind?	Non-album single
2020	"ธรรมดา"	Everyday	Non-album single
2020	"อยากบอกให้รู้"	You	Non-album single
2020	"หยุดอยู่ตรงนั้น"	Breath	Non-album single

==== Guest artist ====
Year	Title	Main Artist	Album
2009	"สุหครับ"	Suharit Siamwalla	เก

== Awards and nominations ==
The band has received the following awards:

- Best New Artist – Fat Awards 2003
- Best Indie Album (Scrubb) – Hamburger Awards 2003
- Duo Artist of the Year – Seed Awards 2008
- Duo or Group Artist of the Year – Fat Awards 2010
- Album of the Year (Kid) – Fat Awards 2010
