= Atlas (Thai band) =

Thai boy band

ATLAS
- Origin: Bangkok Thailand
- Genres: T-pop; Pop dance
- Years active: 2021–present
- Label: XOXO Entertainment
- Members: Napat Osaithai (Junior); Patpaiboon Opassuwan (Jet); Dechathorn Wanwanichkul (Poom); Vichapol Somkid (Nice); Supakit Pennors (Erwin); Thapana Chongkolrattanaporn (Tad)
- Past members: Nanon Nampeeti (Muon)

ATLAS (Thai: แอทลาส) is a Thai boy band formed in 2021 and affiliated with label XOXO Entertainment. The band consists of seven members: Junior, Jet, Poom, Nice, Erwin, Muon, and Tad.

== Name ==
The name "Atlas" holds a dual meaning, referring both to the Titan in Greek mythology who bears the weight of the world, and to a map, symbolizing exploration. As a group of seven young men, Atlas embodies the spirit of adventurers, journeying across the world, through the stars, and within stories that invite others to explore alongside them.

Their official fan club is named "A-lis," a word that means "wings" in Latin. If Atlas is the explorer, then A-lis are the wings that lift and accompany them, soaring together into new realms.

== History ==
XOXO Entertainment revealed the name of its first boy band, Atlas, on September 3, 2021. All members of Atlas had previously trained under 4nologue before officially signing with XOXO Entertainment.

On December 7, 2021, Atlas made their debut with their first single launch event titled "Mayday Mayday", held at the Central World foreyard in Bangkok. They were joined on stage by labelmate 4Eve. Their debut single "Mayday Mayday" is a hip-hop dance single that channels the energy and spirit of youth fueled by determination, belief, and unwavering courage. The track was produced by Nino, Ben, and Pun from Luss, alongside Golf F.Hero, blending rhythmic punch with sonic intensity.

On December 5, 2025, Nanon, one of the members, announced his departure from the band during the band's 4th anniversary celebration, effective December 31, 2025.

== Discography ==
Title	Year	Album
"Mayday Mayday"	2021	ATLAS: The 1st Journey
"Lolay"	2022	ATLAS: The 1st Journey
"Mr.Lonely"	2022	ATLAS: The 1st Journey
"My Treasure"	2022	ATLAS: The 1st Journey
"Boyfriend"	2023	Mangosteen
"One Day"	2023	Mangosteen
"Love Fool"	2023	Mangosteen
"Mangosteen"	2023	Mangosteen
"Boys Do Cry"	2023	Mangosteen
"Still Love You"	2023	Mangosteen
"1987"	2023	Mangosteen
"I Got That Magic"	2024	Non-album singles
"Light It Up"	2024	Non-album singles
"Repeat"	2024	Non-album singles
"Let Me Try Again"	2024	Non-album singles
"Ooh!"	2025	Non-album singles
"Cause We're So..."	2025	Non-album singles
"Bad Comedy"	2025	Non-album singles
"Somtam"	2025	Non-album singles
Move Ya Body"	2026	Non-album singles
"Tell Me Now"	2026	Non-album singles
