= Trinity (Thai band) =

Thai pop boy band

TRINITY
- Also known as: TRINITY_TNT, TNT, ทรินิตี้
- Origin: Bangkok, Thailand
- Genres: T-pop; pop; Hip hop
- Years active: 2019–present
- Label: 4NOLOGUE
- Members: Third (Lapat Ngamchaweng); Porsche (Sivakorn Adulsuttikul); Jackie (Jackrin Kungwankiatichai)
- Past members: James Teeradon Supapunpinyo (2019–2021)

Trinity (stylized as TRINITY) is a three-member Thai pop boy band formed in 2019. The members were brought together by 4NOLOGUE label after the Nine by Nine special project ended in 2019. The group is composed of Third (Lapat Ngamchaweng), Porsche (Sivakorn Adulsuttikul), and Jackie (Jackrin Kungwankiatichai).

While primarily categorized as T-Pop, TRINITY's music incorporates elements of hip-hop, R&B, pop, and ballad, showcasing their diverse musicality. TRINITY aims to bring T-Pop to a global audience and redefine the image of Thai artists as internationally recognized professionals.

== Members ==
- Third (เติร์ด) – vocalist
- Porsche (ปอร์เช่) – rapper
- Jackie (แจ๊คกี้) – vocalist

=== Former member ===
- James (เจมส์) – rapper

== Branding & Concept ==
During their pre-debut training, the three founding members, Third, Porsche, and Jackie, selected the name "TRINITY" with the "TRI" prefix symbolizing the "Three Musketeers" theme. This concept emphasized their commitment to constantly improving through teamwork, singing and dancing practices. When Jamyjames joined the group, the members decided to retain the name "TRINITY" but adapted the concept to a "Four-side Pyramid." In a subsequent interview, Porsche explained that a pyramid requires four sides for stability, reflecting their four-member composition as TRINITY. This concept inspired their group logo and the theme of their first mini-album, "The Elements."

Following Jamyjames' departure in August 2021, TRINITY rebranded their official concept and logo on November 28, 2021. Their logo now features three triangle shapes assembling together, "alike the impeller which is ready to spin forward". It reflects their three-member composition. An official logo of their fandom "TWILIGHT" was also unveiled on the same day. These changes and their conceptual underpinnings are reflected in TRINITY's official merchandise.

== History ==
=== 2019: TRINITY in Pre-debut Days ===
After NINE BY NINE special project ended in March 2019, 4NOLOGUE formed its three exclusive talents in the group – Third, Porsche and Jackie – to take part in a new boy band.

As the members practiced and prepared for the debut, their official name "TRINITY", its official acronym "TNT", and the original concept (Three Musketeers) – were invented.

During this time, Third, Porsche, Jackie regularly appeared together in many brand promotion events, namely as the brand presenter of Bento & Yamaha Thailand.

Meanwhile, after ending his contract with Nadao Bangkok, Jamyjames chose to become an exclusive talent of 4NOLOGUE, and was included on TRINITY project. This explains the change of TRINITY's concept to "Four-side Pyramid."

Training ceaselessly for more than six months, on June 4, 2019, Jamyjames – Third – Porsche – Jackie were officially introduced to the press as "4NOLOGUE ARTIST," but the band name was unrevealed.

Mr. Wutt Anuwat Wichiennarat, CEO of 4NOLOGUE shared his vision with the press, after transforming 4NOLOGUE from an concert organizing agency to an artist management agency: "We intend to pursue a music business by seriously pursuing music [...] Our music market is not dead. Artists still receive support from their fans, and fans still buy their CDs and concert tickets. We just have a duty to produce quality artists. Our artist training team is now a Thai team, we use the same system as the international market. We want to create a quality T-POP phenomenon."

=== 2019: TRINITY Begins – "The Elements" Era ===
On the day "TRINITY" was announced, their hashtag "#TRINITY_TNT" reached No. 1 Trending on Twitter. Even though the members also work in various art categories, being a TRINITY member gives them a way to reload their passion together as music performers.

On September 13, 2019, TRINITY's first ever music video – "Haters Got Nothing" officially launched on YouTube. The music video garnered 1 million views within 18 hours of release. They also released their mini album, "The Elements" to music streaming platforms (Apple Music, iTunes Store, JOOX & Spotify) on the same day. The mini-album was later revealed to the press to receive 100 million Thai baht investment from 4NOLOGUE, with 40 million in music production for four singles, 7–8 million for music video production per song, and 8–10 million for artist practice per year. The concept of the mini-album, as its name, is about four elements of nature that represents each member, according to their personalities:

- Jamyjames is Wind (free-spirited and refreshing)
- Third is Earth (down to earth and caring)
- Porsche is Fire (passionate and strong-willed)
- Jackie is Water (flexible and mysterious)

All four singles for their mini album has a focus on such elements.

TRINITY performed their debut stage on September 17, 2019, at CentralwOrld Square (Bangkok, Thailand). On this day, James – Third – Porsche – Jackie performed live their four songs on the mini-album, and hosted their first-ever fansign event for 600 lucky fans.

TRINITY also released their fandom name, "TWILIGHT," sharing the fact that despite challenges, Twilight sky is always there to offers comfort and the promise of a brighter day ahead.

Following the success of "Haters Got Nothing" music video, TRINITY soon released their second music video, "IOU". This release was accompanied by a series of small concerts titled "TRINITY Showcase." Held in Bangkok, Thailand, each showcase followed the theme of a specific song: "IOU", "Jazzy", "Hidden Track". This series of showcases allowed TRINITY to showcase their performance skills and interact with their growing fanbase in an intimate setting.

Out of the four singles in the mini-album, "Hidden Track" – the only track that was produced by an entire Thai team, becomes TRINITY's most successful hit by far with over 12 million views on YouTube (updated February 2024), along with various remix versions and music covers.

By the end of 2019, they released a four episode documentary called "TRINITY The Elementories" on Line TV. The videos revealed behind-the-scenes of their journey as before and after being TRINITY members, TRINITY as a group and their debut date.

=== 2020: TRINITY during the first COVID-19 outbreak – "5:59 (Five – Fifty Nine)" Era ===
The global outbreak of COVID-19 in 2020 and 2021 significantly impacted TRINITY's planned activities. Their comeback, second album release, and schedules were all delayed.

Both TRINITY and their agency, 4NOLOGUE, attributed the delay to the group's unique production process. They explained that a substantial portion of their music production, typically takes place outside of Thailand, namely in South Korea. The pandemic's restrictions and logistical challenges to international collaborations effectively hindered their progress.

On June 18, 2020 TRINITY became the very first Thai group to have an account on the popular South Korean live streaming app VLIVE. Until the end of the VLIVE service, the boy group made several livestream sessions, so as posting their music videos, "The Elementories" series, special videos for their performances on their "The Elements" showcases and a small vlog series called "One Day With TRINITY."

In response to the COVID-19 pandemic's restrictions on outdoor activities and fan interactions, TRINITY released a special single titled "5:59 (Five – Fifty Nine)" in September 2020. This release coincided with their first anniversary as a group and served as a gift to their fanbase, known as TWILIGHT. The song comes with two versions of music videos.

Featuring an uplifting melody and lyrics, the song expressed TRINITY's longing to connect with their fans. The title "5:59" symbolically referenced the twilight hour, signifying the time they yearned to meet their fans again. Released during a period of physical separation, "5:59 (Five – Fifty Nine)" conveyed a message of hope and anticipation for future reunions.

=== 2020: TRINITY during the second COVID-19 outbreak – "Yesterday Today Tomorrow" Era and The First Concert ===
Following the measures to prevent COVID-19, TRINITY performed as special guest at the Hallyu Festival "Unite On", held online on November 23, 2020. The show had performances of famous k-pop artists, such as Monsta X, Super M, Oh My Girl and Itzy.

In November 2020, 4NOLOGUE announced their new batch of trainees, who shared a track called "Yesterday Today Tomorrow" with TRINITY. The music video, filmed at Emquartier Mall, paved the way for their festive season campaign "Emquartier Winter Wonderland 2020", has reached over 3 million views on YouTube (updated February 2024).

In December 2020, 4NOLOGUE announced TRINITY's official lightstick, coming up with the announcement of their first full concert, "TRINITY INVISIBLE WORLD LIVE IN BANGKOK 2020: REALITY AND IMAGINATION". The concert was planned to take place on December 26, 2020, at Impact Arena (Bangkok, Thailand). To support international fans and fans who couldn't travel due to pandemic restriction, the concert also release live streaming tickets via TTM Live.

However, on December 17, 2020, the second outbreak of COVID-19 hits Thailand, which led to the concert being postponed and all tickets being refunded.

=== 2021: TRINITY with T-Pop Stage and Youtube Content ===
Following the postponement of their first concert due to the pandemic, TRINITY shifted their focus towards honing their skills. In February 2021, they marked their return to the stage as the headliners for the premiere of T-Pop Stage Show, a new Thai music program broadcast by Workpoint TV.

Their performance featured a medley of "Hidden Track" and "Haters Got Nothing." James, Third, Porsche and Jackie showcased their talent through a dynamic combination of dance techniques, including locking and body wave, alongside impressive a cappella vocals. This energetic and polished performance garnered positive feedback from the audience and media, establishing TRINITY as a "leader" of T-Pop's new generation.

To bridge the gap while working on their new album, TRINITY launched a music series titled "TRINITY Music On" throughout 2021. This series showcased their musical and choreographic versatility through music covers.

The first episode of "TRINITY Music On", released in March 2021, featured a special version of their own single, "Yesterday Today Tomorrow." Performed on piano, this cover served as a farewell to member Jamyjames, who was set to depart for filming in Australia.

Shortly after the performance, Jamyjames flied to Australia, to prepare filming for Hollywood movie "Thirteen Lives," adapted from the true story of the 2018 Tham Luang Cave international rescue.

During the absence of Jamyjames, TRINITY continued to engage with fans through the following episodes of "TRINITY Music On" and vlog series "TRINITY VLOG MYSTERY BOX", all released on YouTube.

The three remaining members, Third, Porsche, and Jackie, participated in virtual interviews with brands and radio stations. During one of such interviews, Third, Porsche and Jackie confirmed that their second album is currently in production.

=== 2021: Departure of Jamyjames ===
In August 2021, member Jamyjames Teeradon Supapunpinyo removed the group name "TRINITY" and 4NOLOGUE's contact information from his Instagram profile. This sparked speculation about his potential departure from the group after five months with no activity with TRINITY.

On August 20, 2021, 4NOLOGUE released a notice that Jamyjames and the company are in the process of finding a legal agreement on a contract. They also confirmed TRINITY would continue promotions as a three-member group with Third, Porsche, and Jackie.

Jamyjames subsequently confirmed his official departure from TRINITY and termination of his contract with 4NOLOGUE on the same day. He expressed gratitude to his fellow members for the shared experiences and wished them success in their future endeavors. He also thanked fans for their unwavering support. In October 2021, Jamyjames founded his own company JMJ Label to manage his activities in the industry as an actor, brand presenter and chef.

Despite his departure, Jamyjames has maintained amicable relations with the remaining members:

- He participated in a NINE BY NINE reunion performance with Third, Porsche, and Jackie during the "789 SURVIVAL SPECIAL STAGE" in August 2023.
- He joined Third and Jackie (along with former NINE BY NINE member Jayler) on a dance challenge posted on Third's personal TikTok in October 2023.
- He attended "TRINITY BREATH OF DESIRE CONCERT 2023" as an audience (along with former NINE BY NINE members) in September 2023.
- He performed with Third (who appeared as a surprise guest appearance) on TV show "The Wall Song" in January 2024, on Workpoint 23 Channel.

=== 2022: TRINITY Strikes Back – "BREATH OF DESIRE EP.01" Era ===
On November 30, 2021, TRINITY announced their comeback with their first full-album, divided into two EPs.

The first single, "Life Ain't Over," served as a powerful introduction to the new era "EP.01: BREATH".

A press conference held at Icon Siam, on December 9, revealed a significant 20 million baht investment in "Life Ain't Over" production, with music produced by BLATINUM MUSIC TEAMWANG and the music video filmed entirely in South Korea, showcasing their commitment to high-quality production.

In the same night, TRINITY had a world premiere stage performance of "Life Ain't Over" on the balcony of Icon Siam, with the mall's triangle symbol resembles of TRINITY's logo. The performance ended with a stunning fireworks show overlooking the Chao Phraya River.

From 2021 to 2022, TRINITY continued to release the other tracks from their "EP.01: BREATH", in particular "Nobody," "I Don't Miss You" and "Oh! Oh!." Each track experimented a different music genre and promotion format:

- "Nobody" (Hip-hop, R&B), came with documentary interviews of behind-the-scene creative and production process after the official song released.
- "I Don't Miss You" (Ballad), came with a gala night conference & live performance for music video world premiere.
- "Oh! Oh!" (Pop), came with a vlog series from TRINITY's point of view on creative and production process before the official song released.

=== 2022–2023: TRINITY Goes International – "BREATH OF DESIRE EP.02" Era ===
==== "Champagne Poppin" Release ====
Following the success of "EP.01: BREATH," TRINITY returned on a new chapter with "EP.02: Desire." This era marked a significant shift towards global ambitions, evident in their lead single, "Champagne Poppin."

Released on November 8, 2022, "Champagne Poppin" showcased a hip-hop influenced party track with a unique twist – it became TRINITY's first song sung entirely in English. This strategic move underscored their intention to expand their reach beyond Thailand and conquer the international stage post-pandemic.

"Champagne Poppin" also marked the group's growth in creative control, as TRINITY actively participated in music production, vocal direction, and songwriting. The accompanying music video, released on November 10, 2022, while a performance video with choreography was released on November 24, 2022. "Champagne Poppin" was featured on Spotify charts in several countries, and hit No. 1 of the Top 50 International chart in Thailand.

==== First collaboration with BALLISTIK BOYZ ====
In another step towards their international expansion, TRINITY announced their first-ever collaboration with a Japanese boy band, BALLISTIK BOYZ from LDH Japan. This partnership resulted in the release of the single "Drop Dead," produced by High Cloud Entertainment. The meaning of the song depicts the challenge that BALLISTIK BOYZ and TRINITY faced when achieve their dream of "conquering the music world".

Released in February 2023, "Drop Dead" music video was well-received, garnering positive feedback from audiences across both Thailand and Japan. The accompanying music video has won over 12 million views on YouTube (updated February 2024).

==== 4NOMENON ====
In February 2023, 4NOLOGUE, hosted the "4NOMENON" conference, outlining their vision for the year and emphasizing the "Art of Entertainment" concept. TRINITY played a key role in the event, solidifying their position as the agency's leading artists.

During the conference, a major announcement revealed TRINITY's first international tour, slated to take place across four countries: Vietnam, Japan, the Philippines, and Indonesia.

TRINITY also announced a domestic tour, to perform across Thailand in various music events, further solidifying their status within the domestic music scene.

These appearances aimed to provide TRINITY with valuable opportunities to connect with fans and showcase their talent to wider audiences.

==== International Tour ====
After the announcement, TRINITY kicked off their international tour on June 17–18, 2023 at the "SEEN Festival" in Hoi An, Vietnam. They shared the stage with renowned K-Pop artists like Taeyang, BoA, Hyo, aespa, and KARD, marking a significant moment in their career.

The festival itself garnered positive feedback from audiences in Vietnam, Thailand, and across Asia. As the only Thai artist performing alongside established acts, TRINITY's performance attracted attention for its energy and execution. Their efforts to communicate in Vietnamese and English were well received by the Vietnamese audience, who enthusiastically supported them throughout their arrival and departure. This positive reception marked a success for their first overseas stage.

On June 30, 2023, TRINITY appeared as special guests during the "BALLISTIK BOYZ LIVE TOUR 2023 "N.E.X.T."" at the Garden Theater in Tokyo, Japan, marking their second stop on their international tour. During the encore, TRINITY joined BALLISTIK BOYZ onstage for a performance of their collaborative single, "Drop Dead." This marked the first live performance of the song in Japan.

Continuing their international tour in Japan, TRINITY participated in the "BATTLE OF TOKYO ～CODE OF Jr.EXILE" concert tour alongside BALLISTIK BOYZ and other members of Jr.EXILE. The series spanned four dates across two cities: Saitama Super Arena (on July 21–23, 2023) and Kyocera Dome Osaka (on July 29–30, 2023). These performances marked TRINITY's largest audience to date, with an estimated total of nearly 400,000 viewers.

==== Full-scale Concert: 2023 TRINITY BREATH OF DESIRE CONCERT ====
On September 17, 2023, TRINITY held their first full-scale concert, "2023 TRINITY BREATH OF DESIRE CONCERT," at Impact Arena, Muang Thong Thani, Thailand, coinciding with the group's 4th anniversary.

The set list encompassed approximately 30 songs, featuring their entire discography at the time, from their first single "Haters Got Nothing" to their full album "TRINITY 1ST FULL ALBUM EP.01 BREATH & EP.02 DESIRE," and several song covers. The concert incorporated live band accompaniment and solo stages for each member. TRINITY also featured guest artists: BALLISTIK BOYZ from EXILE TRIBE, DVI, and bXd in the concert.

During the concert, TRINITY's fan club, TWILIGHT, organized a special project where the entire audience held up signs reading "Wishing TRINITY were here with TWILIGHT forever," referencing the lyrics of their song "Five-Fifty Nine".

==== Fanmeeting: TRINITY BREATH OF DESIRE IN MANILA ====
On October 15, 2023, TRINITY held their first-ever international fan meeting, "TRINITY Breath of Desire Fan Meeting in Manila," at the SM North EDSA Skydome in Quezon City, Philippines. The fanmeeting featured performances of their hit songs "Hidden Track" and "100 Days," along with a Filipino song cover. Interactive segments are included, such as mini games with fans and discussions about their music video filming experiences, favorite Filipino foods, and future plans as a group. This event marked the third stop on their international tour.

=== 2023: End of Contract between Third and 4NOLOGUE ===
On December 15, 2023, 4NOLOGUE released an announcement regarding the end of Third Lapat Ngamchaweng (Third)'s contract.

The company announced Third's contract with 4NOLOGUE has expired. Third has decided to become an independent actor and artist and is entitled to make his own decision freely regarding all projects and opportunities in the entertainment industry.

In the terms of activity with TRINITY, they will continue under mutual consideration between the company and Third as they deemed appropriate. 4NOLOGUE also expressed gratitude to Third for his unwavering commitment in creating work, as a TRINITY member.

On the same day, Third confirmed his artist contract with 4NOLOGUE has come to an end on his social media accounts, saying his activity with TRINITY will continue under mutual consideration between the company and Third himself as they deemed appropriate. Third also expressed his gratitude to 4NOLOGUE's team, TRINITY members Porsche & Jackie, and his fans for supporting his dreams and journey with TRINITY.

Third also updated his company T3 Group Entertainment and associated contact on his Instagram profile, followed by the release of the company's social media account on January 27, 2024.

In subsequent interviews, Third stated that he is still a member of TRINITY despite pursuing solo ventures. He emphasized positive relationships with the other members and 4NOLOGUE's CEO Wutt Anuwat Wichiennarat, hinting at future collaborations on new music projects.

It's confirmed that Third will also perform with Porsche and Jackie as TRINITY in the upcoming GOTCHAPOP 2024 concert on May 11, 2024.

=== 2024: End of Contract between Porsche, Jackie and 4NOLOGUE ===
On February 29, 2024, 4NOLOGUE released an announcement regarding the expiration of contracts with Porsche Sivakorn Adulsuttikul (Porsche) and Jackie Jackrin Kungwankiatichai (Jackie).

The company will oversee the completion of all confirmed or ongoing works and continue to support future endeavors. 4NOLOGUE expressed gratitude to Porsche and Jackie for their work as TRINITY members.

Following the announcement, the members of TRINITY expressed gratitude on their social media accounts to 4NOLOGUE's CEO Wutt Anuwat Wichiennarat, the crew, and all TWILIGHT fans for their support.

After the announcement, all three members of TRINITY had a performance show at "PEPSI: Into The New Era Immersive Experience" event on March 1, 2024, at CentralwOrld Square, Bangkok, Thailand. At the event, they hinted at future plans that they might have "something coming" and requested continued support from their fans.

== Discography ==
=== Original Music ===
Year	Album name	Song name
2019	The Elements (mini-album)	1. Haters Got Nothing; 2. I.O.U; 3. Jazzy; 4. Hidden Track
2020	Single	1. 5:59 (Five-Fifty Nine)
2020	Single	1. Yesterday Today Tomorrow with 4NOLOGUE Trainees
2021	Single	1. My Calendula Porsche x Jackie
2021–2022	TRINITY 1st FULL ALBUM EP. 01 BREATH	1. Life Ain't Over; 2. Nobody; 3. I Don't Miss You; 4. Oh! Oh!
2022	Single	1. My Princess Ost. My Sassy Princess เจ้าหญิง
2023	TRINITY 1st FULL ALBUM EP. 02 DESIRE	1. Champagne Poppin; 2. 100 Days; 3. ขอไม่ยินดี (Congrats); 4. Thank You All
2023	Single	1. Drop Dead with Ballistik Boyz

=== Special Versions ===
Year	Song Version	Performed by	Event/Series
2020	Yesterday Today Tomorrow (Piano Version)	TRINITY (James, Third, Porsche, Jackie)	TRINITY Music On
2021	Hidden Track + Haters Got Nothing (Live Medley)	TRINITY (James, Third, Porsche, Jackie)	T-Pop Stage
2021	My Calendula (Studio Version)	Porsche, Jackie	TRINITY Music On
2021	Hidden Track (Orchestra Version)	TRINITY (Third, Porsche, Jackie) with Thailand Philharmonic Orchestra	Music Heals 2021 in collaboration with CentralwOrld x Thailand Philharmonic Orchestra
2021	Life Ain't Over (World Premiere Stage Performance)	TRINITY (Third, Porsche, Jackie)	TRINITY 1ST FULL ALBUM "BREATH" PRESS CONFERENCE at ICONSIAM
2022	I Don't Miss You + Nobody + Life Ain't Over (Special Show)	TRINITY (Third, Porsche, Jackie)	T-Pop Stage EP.50
2022	Life Ain't Over + Nobody (Live)	TRINITY ft. JAYLERR	TOTY Music Awards 2021
2023	ขอไม่ยินดี (Congrats) (Artistic Version)	Porsche (Dance Performance) Third & Jackie (Vocal)	TRINITY 1ST FULL ALBUM EP. 02 DESIRE
2023	Hidden Track (Live)	TRINITY ft. MATCHA	MATCHA Angelogy Stage

=== Solo Music ===
Year	Song name	Performed by	Event/Series
2021	Say It	MILLI ft. Jackie	"Say it with Cornetto" in collaboration with Cornetto Thailand
2022	รักที่ต้องหยุดไว้ (Let's End This)	Jackie	Ost. You Are My Heartbeat จังหวะหัวใจนายสะอาด
2022	Blue Moon	Third	Ost. To My Puzzle Pieces

=== Music Covers ===
Year	Cover name	Original by	Performed by	Event/Series
2019	ลืมไป (Forgot) (Live)	Wanyai แว่นใหญ่ ft. ปู่จ๋าน ลองไมค์	TRINITY (James, Third, Porsche, Jackie)	TRINITY Premiere Showcase STAGE 1: I O U – I'm in Love with You
2019	Good Boy (Live)	GD x Tae Yang	TRINITY (James, Third, Porsche, Jackie)	TRINITY Premiere Showcase STAGE 1: I O U – I'm in Love with You
2019	If I Can't Have You (Live)	Shawn Mendes	James, Third	TRINITY Premiere Showcase STAGE 1: I O U – I'm in Love with You
2019	I Love You 3000 (Live)	Stephanie Poetri ft. Jackson Wang	Porsche, Jackie	TRINITY Premiere Showcase STAGE 1: I O U – I'm in Love with You
2019	I'm Not Sorry (Live)	DEAN ft. Eric Bellinger	TRINITY (James, Third, Porsche, Jackie)	TRINITY Premiere Showcase STAGE 2: Jazzy – Fly Into the Night with You
2019	ผู้โชคดี (The Lucky One) (Live)	NINE BY NINE	TRINITY (James, Third, Porsche, Jackie)	TRINITY Premiere Showcase STAGE 2: Jazzy – Fly Into the Night with You
2019	Nothin' On You (Live)	B.o.B ft. Bruno Mars	James, Jackie	TRINITY Premiere Showcase STAGE 2: Jazzy – Fly Into the Night with You
2019	เมษา (April) (Live)	fellow fellow ft. BLACKSHEEP	Third, Porsche	TRINITY Premiere Showcase STAGE 2: Jazzy – Fly Into the Night with You
2020	รักติดไซเรน (Love Ambulance) (Live)	PARIS, PEARWAH	TRINITY (James, Third, Porsche, Jackie)	TRINITY Premiere Showcase STAGE 3: Hidden Track – I'm Secretly in Love with You]
2020	If I Ain't Got You (Live)	Alicia Keys	Third, Jackie	TRINITY Premiere Showcase STAGE 3: Hidden Track – I'm Secretly in Love with You
2020	Bullshit (Live)	G-Dragon	James, Porsche	TRINITY Premiere Showcase STAGE 3: Hidden Track – I'm Secretly in Love with You
2020	Haters Got Nothing + Titanic + Idol (Live Medley)	TRINITY + Jackson Wang (ft. Rich Brian) + BTS	TRINITY (James, Third, Porsche, Jackie)	LINE TV Awards 2020
2021	Lay Me Down	Sam Smith	Third	TRINITY Music On
2021	247	LUSS	Jackie	TRINITY Music On
2021	Therefore I Am	Billie Eilish	Porsche (Dance Performance)	TRINITY Music On
2021	Spicy	Ty Dolla $ign ft. Post Malone	TRINITY (Third, Porsche, Jackie) (Dance Performance)	TRINITY Music On
2021	ภาพจำ (Memories)	Pop Pongkool	TRINITY (Third, Porsche, Jackie)	T-Pop Stage EP.2
2022	คุยคนเดียวเก่ง (Talking Alone)	Three Man Down	TRINITY (Third, Porsche, Jackie)	T-Pop Stage EP.18
2022	พูดทำไม (Don't Say That You Do)	Two Popetorn	TRINITY (Third, Porsche, Jackie)	ชวนน้องมาร้องเพลง with LoveIS Entertainment
2022	ไม่มีเหตุผล (No Reason)	Marina	Third	ชวนน้องมาร้องเพลง with LoveIS Entertainment
202	Sad O'Clock (Live)	bamm ft. pluto	bamm ft. TRINITY (Third, Porsche, Jackie)	LIT Concert

== Tours and Concerts ==
=== TRINITY Original Concerts ===
Date	Event name	Ref
September 17, 2019	TRINITY The 1st Debut Stage	
November 16, 2019	TRINITY Premiere Showcase STAGE 1: I O U – I'm in Love with You	
December 8, 2019	TRINITY Premiere Showcase STAGE 2: Jazzy – Fly Into the Night with You	
January 26, 2020	TRINITY Premiere Showcase STAGE 3: Hidden Track – I'm Secretly in Love with You	
September 17, 2023	TRINITY INVISIBLE WORLD LIVE IN BANGKOK 2020: REALITY AND IMAGINATION [cancelled]	
September 17, 2023	TRINITY BREATH OF DESIRE CONCERT 2023	

=== Other Concerts, Tours & Music Festivals ===
Date	Event name	Place	Role	Ref
December 7, 2019	BIG MOUNTAIN MUSIC FESTIVAL X (BMMFX)	The Ocean Khao Yai (Nakhon Ratchasima, Thailand)	Official Lineup	
October 24, 2020	Blue Wave Festival 2020	Ambassador City Jomtien (Pattaya, Thailand)	Official Lineup	
November 23, 2020	Hallyu Festival "Unite On"	VLIVE (Virtual Concert)	Official Lineup	
October 16, 2022	OCTOPOP 2022	Rajamangala Stadium (Bangkok, Thailand)	Official Lineup	
December 11, 2022	BIG MOUNTAIN MUSIC FESTIVAL 12	The Ocean Khao Yai (Nakhon Ratchasima, Thailand)	Special Guest	
December 18, 2022	Siam Music Fest 2022	Seefah Stage, Siam Square (Bangkok, Thailand)	Official Lineup	
March 18, 2023	PAINT THE TOWN CONCERT	KICE (Khon Kaen, Thailand)	Official Lineup	
March 25, 2023	Sound Check Festival 2023	Thunderdome Stadium (Bangkok, Thailand)	Official Lineup	
April 14, 2023	SUPERFLUID 2023	CentralwOrld Square (Bangkok, Thailand)	Official Lineup	
May 16, 2023	MATCHA: ANGELOGY STAGE	CentralwOrld (Bangkok, Thailand)	Special Guest	
June 13, 2023	OCTOPUS Campus Tour	Rajavinit Mathayom School (Bangkok, Thailand)	Official Lineup	
June 18, 2023	SEEN FESTIVAL IN HOI AN, VIETNAM	Hoiana Resort & Golf (Hoi An, Vietnam)	Official Lineup	
June 30, 2023	BALLISTIK BOYZ LIVE TOUR 2023 "N.E.X.T."	Garden Theater (Tokyo, Japan)	Special Guest	
July 21-23-29-30, 2023	BATTLE OF TOKYO: CODE OF EXILE	Saitama Super Arena (Saitama, Japan) Kyocera Dome Osaka (Osaka, Japan)	Special Guest	
August 2, 2023	OCTOPUS Campus Tour	Maejo University (Chiang Mai, Thailand)	Official Lineup	
August 19, 2023	LIT Concert	Union Hall, Union Mall Shopping Center (Bangkok, Thailand)	Special Guest	
August 26, 2023	OCTOPUS Campus Tour	The Mall Korat (Nakhon Ratchasima, Thailand)	Official Lineup	
September 9, 2023	GOTCHA POP Concert 2023	Union Hall, Union Mall Shopping Center (Bangkok, Thailand)	Official Lineup	
October 22, 2023	OCTOPOP 2023	Thunderdome Stadium & Thunder Dome (Bangkok, Thailand)	Official Lineup	
November 5, 2023	CAT EXPO	Wonder World Fun Park (Bangkok, Thailand)	Official Lineup	
December 16, 2023	Siam Music Fest 2023	Block K Stage, Siam Square (Bangkok, Thailand)	Official Lineup	
December 10, 2023	Big Mountain Music Festival 13	The Ocean Khao Yai (Nakhon Ratchasima, Thailand)	Official Lineup	
December 31, 2023	CentralwOrld Bangkok Countdown 2024	CentralwOrld Square (Bangkok, Thailand)	Official Lineup	
May 11, 2024	GOTCHA POP Concert 2024 [upcoming]	BITEC Bangna Hall 101 – 103 (Bangkok, Thailand)	Official Lineup	

=== Fansigns ===
Date	Event name	Place
September 17, 2019	TRINITY THE FIRST FANSIGN EVENT	SF WORLD CINEMA, THEATRE 15, CentralwOrld (Bangkok, Thailand)
December 6, 2020	TRINITY 5:59 FANSIGN EVENT	Ultra Arena, Show Dc Rama 9 (Bangkok, Thailand)
August 20–21, 2022	TRINITY 1ST FULL ALBUM | EP.01 BREATH FANSIGN EVENT	MASTERCARD CINEMA, SF WORLD CINEMA CentralwOrld (Bangkok, Thailand)
December 3, 2023	TRINITY 1ST FULL ALBUM | EP.02 DESIRE FANSIGN EVENT	IMAX Laser Quartier Cineart, EMQUARTIER (Bangkok, Thailand)

=== Meet & Greet / Fanmeeting Event ===
Date	Event name	Place	Ref
February 29, 2020	Sweet Moments with TRINITY in collaboration with Emquartier	Flamenco Bangkok Fl.9, Emquartier (Bangkok, Thailand)	
February 17, 2020	4NOLOGUE Greetings in collaboration with CentralwOrld	craftstudiO, 5th fl, centralwOrld (Bangkok, Thailand)	
October 15, 2023	TRINITY BREATH OF DESIRE Fan Meeting in Manila	SM Skydome (Manila, Philippines)	

== Filmography ==
=== TV Series, Movies & Music Video Featuring ===
Year	Project	Type	Featuring	Ref
2021	Mother Gamer	Movie	Third	
2022	You Are My Heartbeat	TV Series	Jackie	
2022	To My Puzzle Pieces	TV Series	Third	
2022	ถึงเธอ จิ๊กซอว์ของฉัน Ost. To My Puzzle Pieces, by Bell Warisara ft. Say Atom	Music Video	Third	
2022	Thirteen Lives	Movie	James	
2023	ลองเลิกกันดีไหม (Next Chapter) by PIXXIE	Music Video	Porsche	
2024	โหมดพระจันทร์ by Zommarie	Music Video	Jackie	
2024	Achilles Curse [upcoming]	Movie	Third	
2024	Club Friday The Series: "The Secret of Dating App" [upcoming]	TV Series	Jackie	

=== Vlogs & Variety Shows Featuring ===
Program	Type	Description	Episode	Date	Featuring
Loukgolf's English Room	Variety show [Featuring]	Third and Porsche shares about their journey together as Kamikaze artists, Nine by Nine members and now TRINITY, and how learning English impacted their life.	Ep.228	October 7, 2019	Third, Porsche
WOODY from Home	Variety show [Featuring]	TRINITY joins famous talk show host WOODY in a virtual interview from home amidst the COVID-19 pandemic.	Single Ep.	May 23, 2020	TRINITY (James, Third, Porsche, Jackie)
One Day with TRINITY	Vlog [Original]	A one-day recap in the personal life with each TRINITY member, during the COVID-19 pandemic.	Ep.1	June 30, 2020	James
One Day with TRINITY	Vlog [Original]	A one-day recap in the personal life with each TRINITY member, during the COVID-19 pandemic.	Ep.2	July 7, 2020	Porsche
One Day with TRINITY	Vlog [Original]	A one-day recap in the personal life with each TRINITY member, during the COVID-19 pandemic.	Ep.3	July 14, 2020	Third
One Day with TRINITY	Vlog [Original]	A one-day recap in the personal life with each TRINITY member, during the COVID-19 pandemic.	Ep.4	July 21, 2020	Jackie
The Driver	Variety show [Featuring]	TRINITY joins hosts Oat Pramote, Pitt Karchai and Paloy Horwang in a car interview about their journey to become a group.	Ep.98	September 24, 2020	TRINITY (James, Third, Porsche, Jackie)
TRINITY Vlog Mystery Box	Vlog [Original]	Each TRINITY member receives a mystery box from their crew, which contains a personal challenge and materials needed to complete.	Ep.1	March 4, 2021	Third
TRINITY Vlog Mystery Box	Vlog [Original]	Each TRINITY member receives a mystery box from their crew, which contains a personal challenge and materials needed to complete.	Ep.2	March 11, 2021	Porsche
TRINITY Vlog Mystery Box	Vlog [Original]	Each TRINITY member receives a mystery box from their crew, which contains a personal challenge and materials needed to complete.	Ep.3	March 18, 2021	Jackie
TRINITY Vlog Mystery Box	Vlog [Original]	Each TRINITY member receives a mystery box from their crew, which contains a personal challenge and materials needed to complete.	Ep.4	March 25, 2021	James
#ความลับกามิ (Kami's Secret)	Vlog [Featuring]	Third and Porsche joins Kamikaze alumni Four-Mod to catch up with their old memories at Kamikaze and uncover their hidden secrets.	Ep.14	August 29, 2021	Third, Porsche
ถ้าหนูรับ พี่จะรักป่ะ (Do you love us if we love you?)	Vlog [Featuring]	TRINITY joins Goy, Natty and Dream to talk about their dating life, ideal partner and relationship goals.	Ep.67	January 15, 2022	TRINITY (Third, Porsche, Jackie)
ถ้าโลกนี้ไม่มี GPS	Variety show [Featuring]	TRINITY takes on challenge to find their shortcut from Phahonyothin 24 to Lat Phrao 15 without GPS.	Ep.16	March 11, 2022	TRINITY (Third, Porsche, Jackie)
Jackie Vlog	Vlog [Original]	Follows Jackie as he talks about his character "Din" in TV Series "You Are My Heartbeat" with other cast members.	Ep.1	March 12, 2022	Jackie
Jackie Vlog	Vlog [Original]	Follows Jackie as he talks about his character "Din" in TV Series "You Are My Heartbeat" with other cast members.	Ep.2	March 26, 2022	Jackie
Jackie Vlog	Vlog [Original]	Follows Jackie as he talks about his character "Din" in TV Series "You Are My Heartbeat" with other cast members.	Ep.3	April 9, 2022	Jackie
Jackie Vlog	Vlog [Original]	Follows Jackie as he talks about his character "Din" in TV Series "You Are My Heartbeat" with other cast members.	Ep.4	April 23, 2022	Jackie
Third Vlog	Vlog [Original]	Follows Third in his behind the scene moments filming, promoting and singing soundtrack for TV Series "To My Puzzle Pieces" – with other cast members and production crew.	Ep.1	April 15, 2022	Third
Third Vlog	Vlog [Original]	Follows Third in his behind the scene moments filming, promoting and singing soundtrack for TV Series "To My Puzzle Pieces" – with other cast members and production crew.	Ep.2	April 29, 2022	Third
Third Vlog	Vlog [Original]	Follows Third in his behind the scene moments filming, promoting and singing soundtrack for TV Series "To My Puzzle Pieces" – with other cast members and production crew.	Ep.3	June 3, 2022	Third
Third Vlog	Vlog [Original]	Follows Third in his behind the scene moments filming, promoting and singing soundtrack for TV Series "To My Puzzle Pieces" – with other cast members and production crew.	Ep.4	June 10, 2022	Third
The Driver	Variety show [Featuring]	TRINITY returns to The Driver show, this time talks about their personal hobbies and future plans aside the band's latest music – Ep.01: BREATH.	Ep.154	May 12, 2022	TRINITY (Third, Porsche, Jackie)
Pic About	Variety show [Featuring]	TRINITY confides about the creating process of their latest music product "I Don't Miss You", as well as childhood memories through each photo.	Ep.9 Part 1 Part 2	May 26, 2022	TRINITY (Third, Porsche, Jackie)
KAYAVINE	Vlog [Featuring]	TRINITY splits team with YouTuber Kay Lertsittichai to compete in speedy Q&A game – while trying not to get wet!	Single Ep.	August 16, 2022	TRINITY (Third, Porsche, Jackie)
3 หนุ่ม Trinity ตัวตึงแห่งวงการบอยกรุ๊ป กับสเป็คสาวที่ชอบของเค้า!! (TRINITY, three toughest guys in the boy group world and the type of girl they like)	Vlog [Featuring]	TRINITY spend a day hang out with singer, YouTuber Four Sakonrut while gossiping about their lifestyle, dating life, ideal partner and upcoming projects.	Single Ep.	November 26, 2022	TRINITY (Third, Porsche, Jackie)
ทอล์ก-กะ-เทยส์ (Talk With Toey)	Variety show [Featuring]	TRINITY joins the late-night talkshow with host Niti Chaichitathorn (Pompam), where they talk about funny stories of their childhood and as a group.	Ep.94	February 19, 2023	TRINITY (Third, Porsche, Jackie)
TRINITY Vlog In Tokyo	Vlog [Original]	A recap of TRINITY during their trip in Japan, including their dancing lessons at EXPG Dance Studio and hopping around Tokyo and Osaka.	Ep.1	March 8, 2023	TRINITY (Third, Porsche, Jackie)
TRINITY Vlog In Tokyo	Vlog [Original]	A recap of TRINITY during their trip in Japan, including their dancing lessons at EXPG Dance Studio and hopping around Tokyo and Osaka.	Ep.2	March 14, 2023	TRINITY (Third, Porsche, Jackie)
#XXChallenge2 – Making Process	Vlog [Original]	Follows Porsche in the production process of his own birthday song, combined all the lyrics from the fans' suggestion.	Ep.1	May 19, 2023	Porsche
TRINITY Checklist	Variety Show [Original]	TRINITY receives a checklist of challenges from their celebrity friends. What is on the checklist?	Ep.0	June 2, 2023	TRINITY (Third, Porsche, Jackie)
TRINITY Checklist	Variety Show [Original]	TRINITY becomes detectives to solve the mystery in escape games. Can they crack the case?	Ep.1	June 16, 2023	TRINITY (Third, Porsche, Jackie)
TRINITY Checklist	Variety Show [Original]	TRINITY tries to takes care of a baby together for their first time. Who will become the favourite big brother of "Nong Melody"?	Ep.2 Part 1 Part 2	July 17 – August 4, 2023	TRINITY (Third, Porsche, Jackie)
TRINITY Checklist	Variety Show [Original]	TRINITY practices making handicrafts, what will they create?	Ep.3	August 25, 2023	TRINITY (Third, Porsche, Jackie)
TRINITY Checklist	Variety Show [Original]	Porsche goes on a date with a secret lady under the control of Third and Jackie. Can he won her heart?	Ep.4	September 27, 2023	TRINITY (Third, Porsche, Jackie)
TRINITY Checklist	Variety Show [Original]	TRINITY hits the water when trying wavesurf together. Who will conquer the sea?	Ep.5	November 3, 2023	TRINITY (Third, Porsche, Jackie)
TRINITY Checklist	Variety Show [Original]	TRINITY goes on camping with their friends, where they take part in challenges, prepare the barbecue, and relive old memories through their remarkable 4-year journey.	Ep.6 Part 1 Part 2	December 21 – January 5, 2024	TRINITY (Third, Porsche, Jackie)

== Awards and nominations ==
Year	Nominated work	Category	Award	Result	Ref.
2020	TRINITY	Trending Artist	Kazz Awards 2020	Won	
2020	TRINITY	New Artist of the Year	2020 Joox Thailand Music Awards	Nominated	
2020	TRINITY	Popular Thai International Artist	16th Komchadluek Awards	Nominated	
2021	TRINITY	Youth Favorite Artist – Group	2020–2021 Thailand Master Youth Awards	Won	
2021	TRINITY	Top Social Artist of the Year	2021 Joox Thailand Music Awards	Nominated	
2021	TRINITY	Favorite Group Artist	Maya Awards 2021	Nominated	
2021	TRINITY	Trending Artist	Kazz Awards 2021	Nominated	

== Brand Partnerships ==
=== Non-fashion Brands ===
Time	Brand	Partnered with	Role	Ref
2019	Yamaha Thailand	Third, Porsche, Jackie	Brand Presenter	
2021	Yamaha Thailand	Third, Porsche, Jackie	Endorser	
2019–2020	Bento	Third, Porsche, Jackie	Brand Presenter	
2020–2021	Mali	TRINITY (James, Third, Porsche, Jackie)	Brand Presenter	
2020	Fanta Thailand	TRINITY (James, Third, Porsche, Jackie)	Brand Presenter	
2019–2021	Samsung Thailand	Third, Porsche, Jackie	Endorser	
2021–2022	AIS 5G	TRINITY (Third, Porsche, Jackie)	Brand Presenter	
2021	Nespresso TH	Third	Endorser	
2022	Nespresso TH	Porsche	Endorser	
2021	Purra Mineral Water	TRINITY (Third, Porsche, Jackie)	Endorser	
2021	Kiehl's Thailand	Porsche, Jackie	Brand Presenter as Friends of Kiehl's	
2022	Kiehl's Thailand	Third, Porsche, Jackie	Brand Presenter as Friends of Kiehl's	
2023–present	Pepsi Thailand	TRINITY (Third, Porsche, Jackie)	Endorser	
2023	9CE	Third	Brand Presenter	
2023	PUBG Mobile	Third	Endorser	
2023–present	Lolane Pixxel	Jackie	Brand Presenter	
2023	Leica Thailand	Porsche	Endorser	
2023	Bangkok Bank	TRINITY (Third, Porsche, Jackie)	Endorser	
2023	Johnnie Walker	Third, Porsche	Endorser	
2023	Neta Auto Thailand	Jackie	Endorser	
2023	L'Oreal Thailand	Porsche, Jackie	Endorser	

=== Fashion Brands ===
Time	Brand	Partnered with	Role	Ref
2019–present	Bvlgari	TRINITY (James, Third, Porsche, Jackie)	Endorser	
2019–present	Off-White	TRINITY (Third, Porsche, Jackie)	Endorser	
2019–present	Palms Angel Bangkok	TRINITY (Third, Porsche, Jackie)	Endorser	
2019	Adidas Originals Thailand	TRINITY (James, Third, Porsche, Jackie)	Endorser	
2020–present	Tiffany & Co.	TRINITY (James, Third, Porsche, Jackie)	Endorser	
2020	Franck Muller in collaboration with Pendulum Thailand	Third	Endorser	
2020	Converse	TRINITY (James, Third, Porsche, Jackie)	Endorser	
2020	GEMS PAVILION	TRINITY (James, Third, Porsche, Jackie)	Endorser	
2019–present	Gucci	TRINITY (James, Third, Porsche, Jackie)	Endorser	
2020–2022	Burberry	Third	Endorser	
2020	Bottega Veneta	Third, Jackie	Endorser	
2020	Calvin Klein Thailand	Third, Porsche	Endorser	
2019–2023	Givenchy	Third	Endorser	
2019–2023	Givenchy	Jackie	Endorser	
2021–present	SAINT LAURENT	TRINITY (James, Third, Porsche, Jackie)	Endorser	
2021–present	SAINT LAURENT	TRINITY (Third, Porsche, Jackie)	Endorser	
2021–present	SAINT LAURENT	Third	Endorser	
2021–present	SAINT LAURENT	Jackie	Endorser	
2022	Onitsuka Tiger	TRINITY (Third, Porsche, Jackie)	Endorser	
2022	Reven (Reven Exquisite)	TRINITY (Third, Porsche, Jackie)	Endorser	
2022	Louis Vuitton	TRINITY (Third, Porsche, Jackie)	Endorser	
2022	LOEWE in collaboration with PP Group Thailand	TRINITY (Third, Porsche, Jackie)	Endorser	
2022	MCM Thailand	Third	Endorser	
2022	Tomford	Third	Endorser	
2022	Dior	Third	Endorser	
2022	Fendi	Third	Endorser	
2022	Alexander McQueen	Third	Endorser	
2022	Ferragamo	Porsche	Endorser	
2022	UNIQLO	TRINITY (Third, Porsche, Jackie)	Endorser	
2023	Tomford Beauty	Porsche	Endorser	
2023	Tomford Beauty	Jackie	Endorser	
2023	Jo Malone London	Third	Endorser	
2023	Prada	Third	Endorser	
2023	Prada Beauty	TRINITY (Third, Porsche, Jackie)	Endorser	
2023	Vivienne Westwood Thailand in collaboration with Central Department Store	Third	Endorser	
2023	Sandro Paris in collaboration with Central Department Store	Jackie	Endorser	
2023	Dior Beauty	Jackie	Endorser	
2023	niko and...	TRINITY (Third, Porsche, Jackie)	Endorser	
2023	Cartier	TRINITY (Third, Porsche, Jackie)	Endorser	
2023	Club 21 Thailand	TRINITY (Third, Porsche, Jackie)	Endorser	
2023	Crocs	Jackie	Endorser	
2023	Kenzo	Jackie	Endorser	
2024	Jean Paul Gautier	Jackie	Endorser	
