= Nine Entertain Awards =

Annual Thai entertainment awards

- Awarded for: Outstanding achievements in the Thai entertainment industry
- Country: Thailand
- Presented by: MCOT Public Company Limited
- First award: 29 May 2008
- Website: nineentertain.mcot.net

The Nine Entertain Awards (Thai: ไนน์เอ็นเตอร์เทน อวอร์ดส์) is an annual awards ceremony presented by MCOT Public Company Limited to honor outstanding achievements in the Thai entertainment industry, recognizing both on-screen talents and behind-the-scenes professionals. Described as one of Thailand's most prestigious entertainment events, the ceremony has been held annually since 2008, with the first edition taking place on 29 May 2008 at the Thailand Cultural Centre.

== History ==
The Nine Entertain Awards were established by the NineEntertain business division of MCOT Public Company Limited. The inaugural ceremony was held on 29 May 2008 at the Thailand Cultural Centre. The 2026 edition, themed "Rise of Thainess," took place on 12 March 2026 at Paragon Hall, Siam Paragon, celebrating Thai culture and talent on a global stage.

== Trophy ==
The award trophy, designed by Wichit Aphichatkriangkrai, is a bronze sculpture of a figure bowing to receive applause.

== Award categories ==
The awards are divided into three main types:

Royal Award (presented by HRH Princess Maha Chakri Sirindhorn):

- Entertainment in Honor of Morality (บันเทิงเทิดธรรม)

Judge's Choice Awards:

- Actor of the Year
- Actress of the Year
- Drama/Series of the Year
- Film of the Year
- Host of the Year
- Solo Artist of the Year
- Group Artist of the Year
- Song of the Year
- Creative Team of the Year
- Family of the Year

Popular Vote Awards (fan voting via SMS and website):

- People's Choice Award (ขวัญใจมหาชน)
- Couple of the Year (คู่จิ้นแห่งปี)
- Shining Star of the Year (ดาวรุ่งแห่งปี)
