= Kazz Magazine =

Thai fashion and lifestyle magazine owned by Haemarit Co., Ltd.

- Kazz Magazine Vol. 10, Issue No. 117
- Categories: Fashion; Lifestyle
- Frequency: Monthly
- Publisher: Haemarit Co., Ltd.
- Country: Thailand
- Based in: Bangkok
- Language: Thai
- Website: kazz-magazine.com
- ISSN: 1686-8471

Kazz Magazine (sometimes stylized as KAZZ Magazine) is a Thai monthly fashion and lifestyle magazine owned by Haemarit Co., Ltd. covering topics about entertainment personalities and celebrities. The magazine is mainly read by a younger audience with a range of 18 to 28 years old and is mostly circulated within Bangkok and nearby areas.

The magazine also presents an annual entertainment award called Kazz Awards.
