= DMD Friendship =

Thai reality television show

- Also known as: DMD Friendship the Reality
- Genre: Reality competition
- Country of origin: Thailand
- Original language: Thai
- No. of seasons: 3
- No. of episodes: 18

Production
- Running time: 58–124 minutes
- Production company: Domundi TV

Original release
- Network: YouTube (Season 1–3); One 31 (Season 2); iQIYI (Season 3)
- Release: 17 December 2023 – present

DMD Friendship the Reality is a Thai reality competition show produced by Domundi TV. The program features trainees and artists competing in missions while building chemistry with potential partners. The winning couples are awarded leading roles in boys' love (BL) series produced by Domundi.

The show has currently aired three seasons, all of which are available on YouTube on Mandee Channel. The first season began airing on 17 December 2023.

== Format ==
The show gathers members under Domundi to work together and to get to know one another through different activities, such as modelling, singing and acting. Contestants are paired together to test their compatibility. Winners of each mission are rewarded with "Friendship Time", which allows the winner to spend time and bond with a partner of their choice. Towards the end of each season, contestants have the option to choose a person they wish to be partnered with.

In the final episode, contestants perform on stage in front of a panel of judges. Contestants choose a member to win the Best Friendship Award. The judges then choose a winner for the Best Performance Award, as well as a couple for the Best Partner Award. The winning couple gets the opportunity to star in the lead roles of a series.

== Series overview ==
| Season | Episodes | Originally released | | |
| Season | Episodes | First released | Last released | Network |
|---|---|---|---|---|
| 1 | 6 | 17 December 2023 | 28 January 2024 | YouTube |
| Special | | 14 March 2024 | | YouTube |
| 2 | 6 | 6 October 2024 | 10 November 2024 | One 31 |
| 3 | 6 | 21 December 2025 | 23 January 2026 | iQIYI |

== Season 1 ==
The first season, named DMD Friendship the Reality, aired on YouTube from December 2023 to January 2024.

| Name | Nickname | Role |
|---|---|---|
| Ratchapong Anomakiti | Poppy | Host (Ep. 1–2) |
| Sorntast Buangam | Mark | Host (Ep. 3–5) |
| Parnupat Anomakiti | Park | Host (Ep. 6) |
| Pruk Panich | Zee | Judge (Ep. 1) |
| Jeerapat Pimanprom | Pentor | Judge (Ep. 3) |
| Chawarin Perdpiriyawong | NuNew | Judge (Ep. 3) |
| Piamchon Damrongsunthornchai | Tonnam | Judge (Ep. 4) |
| Jennis Oprasert | Jennis | Judge (Ep. 4) |
| Jassada Janmano | Gems | Regular member |
| Kongpob Jirojmontri | Kong | Regular member |
| Wannakorn Reungrat | FirstOne | Regular member |
| Wanpichit Nimitparkpoom | TeeTee | Regular member |
| Thanutchon Chankaewarmorn | Latte | Regular member |
| Teetut Chungmanirat | Thomas | Regular member |
| Napatsakorn Pingmuang | Namping | Regular member |
| Harit Buayoi | Keng | Regular member |
| Matimun Sreeboonrueang | Tle | Regular member (Ep. 3–6) |

=== Pairing history ===
| Participant | Episode | | | | | | | | | | | |
| Participant | 1 | 2 | | | 3 | | 4 | | | 5 | | |
| Participant | Photo shoot | Friendship Time | Short video | Friendship Time | Singing | Friendship Time | | Acting | Friendship Time | 10 Questions | Friendship Time | Partner selection |
|---|---|---|---|---|---|---|---|---|---|---|---|---|
| Gems | | Latte | Latte | | Did not qualify | | | Latte | | Tle | | Tle |
| Kong | | Thomas | Thomas | | Did not qualify | | | Thomas | | Selected | | Thomas |
| FirstOne | | Latte | TeeTee | Keng | Winner | Tle | | Selected | | Selected | | Did not choose |
| TeeTee | | Selected | FirstOne | Thomas | Did not qualify | | | Selected | | Kong | | TeeTee |
| Latte | Finalist | FirstOne | Gems | | Did not qualify | | | Gems | | FirstOne | | FirstOne |
| Thomas | Finalist | Kong | Kong | Selected | Did not qualify | | | Selected | Kong | Did not participate | | Kong |
| Namping | Finalist | Kong | Keng | | 4th place | | Selected | Keng | | Selected | Keng | Keng |
| Namping | Finalist | Kong | Keng | | 4th place | | Selected | FirstOne | | Selected | Keng | Keng |
| Keng | Winner | TeeTee | Namping | Selected | 2nd place | | Namping | Selected | | Namping | | Namping |
| Tle | Absent | | | | 3rd place | Selected | | TeeTee | | Selected | | FirstOne |

Mission finalist
Won mission/selected, rewarded Friendship Time
Rewarded Friendship Time
Did not make a final pair
Made a final pair

=== Final awards ===
- Best Friendship Award
  - Wannakorn Reungrat (FirstOne)
- Best Performance Award
  - Winner: Wannakorn Reungrat (FirstOne)
  - Runner-up: Teetut Chungmanirat (Thomas)
- Best Partner Award
  - Harit Buayoi (Keng) and Napatsakorn Pingmuang (Namping), who starred in Khemjira (2025).
  - Teetut Chungmanirat (Thomas) and Kongpob Jirojmontri (Kong), who starred in Your Sky (2024).

The Best Partner Award was awarded to both couples due to a tie score given by the judges.

== Season 2 ==
The second season, named DMD Friendship the Reality, It Takes Two, aired on YouTube and One 31 from 6 October 2024 to 10 November 2024.

| Name | Nickname | Role |
|---|---|---|
| Ratchapong Anomakiti | Poppy | Host (Ep. 1–2, 6) |
| Kornthas Rujeerattanavorapan | Max | Host (Ep. 3) |
| Sorntast Buangam | Mark | Host (Ep. 4) |
| Harit Buayoi | Keng | Judge (Ep. 1) |
| Sittichok Pueakpoolpol | Tommy | Judge (Ep. 2) |
| Ratchanon Ruenpech | Gun | Judge (Ep. 2) |
| Pannathorn Jirasart | Kim | Judge (Ep. 2) |
| Pittaya Saechua | Daou | Judge (Ep. 2) |
| Janistar Phomphadungcheep | Janis | Judge (Ep. 3) |
| Pruk Panich | Zee | Judge (Ep. 4) |
| Virahya Pattarachokchai | Gina | Judge (Ep. 4) |
| Pongsaton Sittipan | Kim | Regular member |
| Thanakrit Chiamchunya | Ohm | Regular member |
| Suppakarn Jirachotikul | Por | Regular member |
| Chirachart Buspavanich | Patji | Regular member |
| Radchapon Phornpinit | JJ | Regular member |
| Thanaphum Sestasittikul | Auau | Regular member |
| Worapong Walor | Save | Regular member |
| Karn Kritsanaphan | Jimmy | Regular member (Ep. 2–6) |
| Siraphop Manithikhun | Net | Regular member (Ep. 2–6) |
| Thanutchon Chankaewarmorn | Latte | Regular member (Ep. 2–6) |
| Wanpichit Nimitparkpoom | TeeTee | Regular member (Ep. 2–6) |
| Tinnapat Tusnytraitep | Ryujin | Regular member (Ep. 3–6) |

=== Pairing history ===
| Participant | Episode | | | | | | | | |
| Participant | 1 | | 2 | 3 | | 4 | | 5 | |
| Participant | Photo shoot | Friendship Time | Singing | Friendship Time | Acting | Friendship Time | Modelling | Friendship Time | Partner selection |
|---|---|---|---|---|---|---|---|---|---|
| Kim | Finalist | Auau | Did not qualify | | Latte | | | Selected | Latte |
| Ohm | Finalist | Selected | Did not qualify | | Jimmy | | Winner | | Jimmy |
| Por | Winner | Ohm | Qualified | | TeeTee | | MVP | Patji | TeeTee |
| Patji | | Kim | Qualified | | Auau | | | Selected | Patji |
| JJ | | Kim | Winner | Net | Net | | | | Net |
| Auau | Finalist | Patji | 2nd place | Save | Patji | | Winner | Selected | Save |
| Save | | Auau | Did not qualify | Selected | Ryujin | | Winner | | Auau |
| Jimmy | Absent | | | | Ohm | | Winner | | Ohm |
| Net | Absent | | | Selected | JJ | | | | JJ |
| Latte | Absent | | | | Kim | | Winner | Kim | Kim |
| TeeTee | Absent | | | | Por | | Winner | | Por |
| Ryujin | Absent | | | | Save | | | Auau | Ryujin |

Mission finalist
Won mission/selected, rewarded Friendship Time
Won mission, rewarded group Friendship Time
Rewarded Friendship Time
Won mission, rewarded group Friendship Time, won MVP award, but gave MVP reward to Save, who passed it to Latte
Did not make a final pair
Made a final pair

=== Final awards ===
- Best Friendship Award
  - First place: Pongsaton Sittipan (Kim)
  - Second place: Radchapon Phornpinit (JJ)
- Best Performance Award
  - Winner: Thanaphum Sestasittikul (Auau)
  - Runners-up: Suppakarn Jirachotikul (Por), Chirachart Buspavanich (Patji)
- Best Partner Award
  - Wanpichit Nimitparkpoom (TeeTee) and Suppakarn Jirachotikul (Por), who starred in Duang with You (2026).

== Season 3 ==
The third season, named DMD Friendship the Reality, The Third Chapter, premiered on 21 December 2025, airing weekly on Sundays on iQIYI and YouTube, with the exception of the final two episodes, which aired on Fridays.

On 9 February 2026, the nine members of DMD Gen 5, namely Pung, North, Porsche, Fifa, Copper, Otto, Phupha, Wave and Pete, released their single "My No. 1 Duo", which was used as the opening theme song in the final two episodes of the third season.

| Name | Nickname | Role |
|---|---|---|
| Parnupat Anomakiti | Park | Host (Ep. 1) |
| Ratchapong Anomakiti | Poppy | Host (Ep. 2, 6) |
| Supamongkon Wongwisut | Jamessu | Host (Ep. 4) |
| Teetut Chungmanirat | Thomas | Judge (Ep. 1) |
| Sittichok Pueakpoolpol | Tommy | Judge (Ep. 2) |
| Matimun Sreeboonrueang | Tle | Judge (Ep. 2) |
| Wannakorn Reungrat | FirstOne | Judge (Ep. 2) |
| Napatsakorn Pingmuang | Namping | Judge (Ep. 3) |
| Phirunwat Promrat | Pung | Regular member |
| Chatchapon Pranotphong | North | Regular member |
| Thanut Osaithai | Fifa | Regular member |
| Sorranan Suksawat | Otto | Regular member |
| Sitha Kanchana-alongkorn | Porsche | Regular member |
| Phuriwat Chotiratanasak | Copper | Regular member |
| Thanaphat Tansakul | Wave | Regular member |
| Siraphop Moonsarn | Phupha | Regular member |
| Chnanvichya Roongsiripasert | Pete | Regular member |
| Chirachart Buspavanich | Patji | Regular member |
| Tinnapat Tusnytraitep | Ryujin | Regular member |

=== Pairing history ===
| Participant | Episode | | | | | | | | | | | | |
| Participant | 1 | | | 2 | | 3 | | | 4 | | | 5 | |
| Participant | Letter | Photo shoot | | Friendship Time | Singing (Duet) | Friendship Time | Letter | Friendship Time | | Acting | Friendship Time | | Partner selection |
| Participant | Letter | Solo | Pair | Friendship Time | Singing (Duet) | Friendship Time | Letter | Friendship Time | | Acting | Friendship Time | | Partner selection |
|---|---|---|---|---|---|---|---|---|---|---|---|---|---|
| Pung | Absent | | Patji | Selected | Did not qualify | Did not choose | Copper | Selected | | Copper | | Copper | Copper |
| North | Otto | | Patji | | Absent | Otto | Otto | | | Otto | | | Otto |
| Fifa | Pete | Finalist | Ryujin | | Copper | Selected | Patji | | | Selected | Copper | | Copper |
| Otto | North | Finalist | Patji | | Phupha | North | North | | Phupha | Selected | North | | North |
| Porsche | Phupha | | Ryujin | | Did not qualify | Did not choose | Ryujin | Pung | | Selected | | | Did not choose |
| Copper | Fifa | Winner | Ryujin | Pung | Fifa | Pung | Pung | | | Fifa | Selected | Selected | Fifa |
| Copper | Fifa | Winner | Ryujin | Pung | Fifa | Pung | Pung | | | Selected | Selected | Selected | Fifa |
| Wave | Fifa | Finalist | Patji | | Absent | Ryujin | Fifa | | | Pete | | | Fifa |
| Phupha | Otto | Finalist | Ryujin | | Otto | Absent | | | Selected | Porsche | | | Otto |
| Pete | Otto | | Ryujin | | Patji | Fifa | Copper | | | Selected | | | Did not choose |
| Patji | Absent | | Leader | | Pete | Fifa | Ryujin | | Ryujin | Selected | | | Ryujin |
| Ryujin | Absent | | Leader | | Did not qualify | Porsche | Porsche | | Patji | Patji | | | Patji |

Sent a letter to
Mission finalist
Won mission/selected, rewarded Friendship Time
Won mission, rewarded group Friendship Time
Rewarded Friendship Time
Won MVP award, rewarded with dinner with everyone, but gave reward to spend the night with another participant to Fifa
Did not make a final pair
Made a final pair

=== Final awards ===
- Best Friendship Award
  - Thanaphat Tansakul (Wave)
- Best Performance Award
  - Sorranan Suksawat (Otto)
- Best Shining Star Award
  - Thanut Osaithai (Fifa)
  - Siraphop Moonsarn (Phupha)
  - Chnanvichya Roongsiripasert (Pete)
- Best Partner Award
  - Tinnapat Tusnytraitep (Ryujin) and Chirachart Buspavanich (Patji)

== Judges ==
DMD Friendship the Reality has featured a rotating panel of judges drawn from different areas of the Thai entertainment industry. The panel typically includes professionals working behind the scenes, such as magazine directors, vocal and acting coaches, as well as established performers. Their role is to evaluate contestants during missions and provide guidance on performance and chemistry. Among the artists who have appeared as guest judges are Zee Pruk Panich, Daou Pittaya, Tommy Sittichok Pueakpoolpol, Tle, FirstOne, and Thomas.
