= Napatsakorn Pingmuang =

Thai actor (born 2001)

- นภัสกร ปิงเมือง
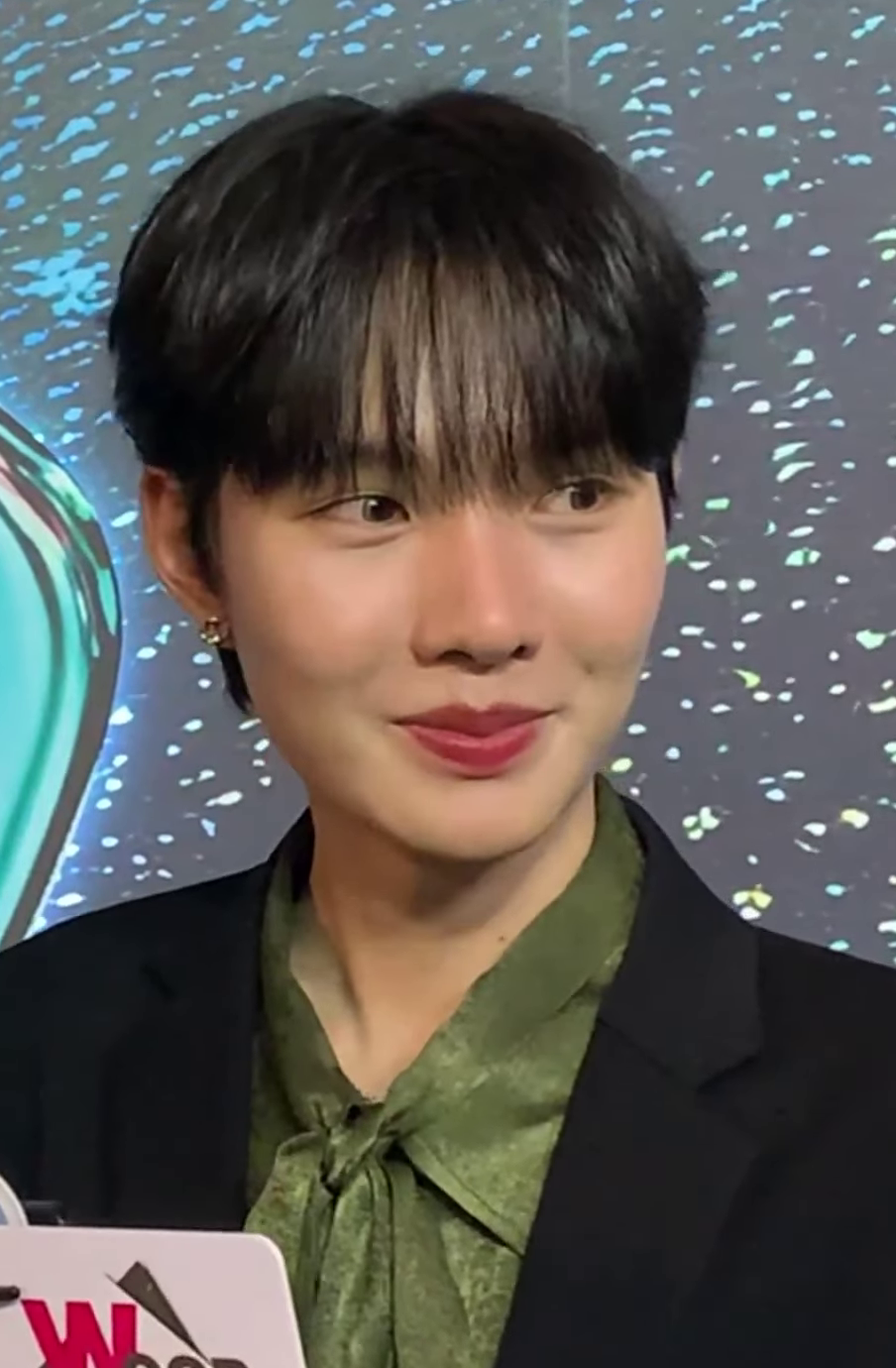
- Namping in November 2024
- Born: 17 February 2001 (age 25); Mae Hong Son province, Thailand
- Other name: Namping
- Occupation: Actor
- Years active: 2022–present
- Agent: Domundi TV
- Known for: Khem in Khemjira
- Height: 180 cm (5 ft 11 in)

Napatsakorn Pingmuang (Thai: นภัสกร ปิงเมือง; born 17 February 2001), nicknamed Namping (Thai: น้ำปิง), is a Thai actor under Domundi TV. He is best known for his roles as Phutson in After Sundown (2023) and Khem in Khemjira (2025).

== Early life and education ==
Namping was born in Mae Hong Son province, Thailand, on 17 February 2001. During high school, he served as president of the student council at Maesariang Boripat Suksa School. He later studied journalism, information and new media at the Faculty of Communication Arts of Chulalongkorn University, graduating in 2023.

== Career ==
Namping began his career in the entertainment industry in 2022, when he appeared as the protagonist in the music video for "Melt (โต๊ะริม)" by Nont Tanont, directed by Third of Tilly Birds. In 2023, he joined Domundi TV as part of its third generation through the reality show DMD Friendship. That same year, he made his acting debut as Phutson, a supporting character in the film After Sundown.

In August 2025, he starred in his first leading role in Khemjira, opposite Harit Buayoi (Keng).

== Discography ==
=== Singles ===
==== Collaborations ====
Year	Title	Artist	Ref.
2024	"Cuteness Center" (ศูนย์รวมความน่ารัก)	DMD Gen 3	
2026	"จุ๊บเธอ (Jubu Jub)" (feat. DMD Boys)	DMD Cute Boys	
2026	"รักฉันจะมั่นคง (Secure)"	Keng Namping x Marr Team	

==== Soundtrack appearances ====
Year	Title	Album	Ref.
2025	"สมมติ (Suppose)"	Khemjira OST	
2025	"Never Apart" (ทุกชาติภพ) (with Keng Harit)	Khemjira OST	
2026	"เกี่ยวก้อย (Forever Entwined)" (with Namping, Tle, FirstOne)	Khemjira OST	
2026	"คู่บุญ (Soulmate)" (with Keng Harit)	Khemjira Forever OST	
2026	"ตลอดกาล (Eternally Yours)" (with Keng, Tle, FirstOne)	Khemjira Forever OST	

== Filmography ==
=== Film ===
Year	Title	Role	Notes	Ref.
2023	After Sundown	Phutson	Supporting role	

=== Television series ===
Year	Title	Role	Network	Notes	Ref.
2023	Night Dream	Nat	Youku	Supporting role	
2025	Khemjira	Khemjira Chandrapisut	One 31, iQIYI	Main role	
2025	Me and Who	Karn	WeTV	Guest role	
2025	Zomvivor	Chi	Netflix	Supporting role	
2026	Khemjira Forever	Khemjira Chandrapisut	One 31, iQIYI	Main role	
TBA	Magic Lover	Vivian Fatherant		Main role	
TBA	Uke	TBA		Main role	
TBA	Still Holding up like the Moon	TBA		Main role	

== Awards and nominations ==
Award	Year	Category	Nominee/work	Result	Ref.
Bangkok Pride Awards	2026	Pride Popular of Y Series Star	with Harit Buayoi	Won	
Feed x Khaosod Awards	2025	Best Chemistry (Popular Vote)	with Harit Buayoi	Nominated	
Feed x Khaosod Awards	2026	Best Chemistry of the Year	with Harit Buayoi	Won	
Feed x Khaosod Awards	2026	Best Chemistry (Popular Vote)	with Harit Buayoi	Nominated	
Howe Awards	2026	The Best Couple Award	with Harit Buayoi	Nominated	
Howe Awards	2026	Shining Male Award	Napatsakorn Pingmuang	Nominated	
Kazz Awards	2026	Couple of the Year	with Harit Buayoi	Nominated	
Kazz Awards	2026	Popular Male Teenage Award	Napatsakorn Pingmuang	Won	
Kazz Awards	2026	Youth Choice of the Year (5th place)	Napatsakorn Pingmuang	Won	
Kom Chad Luek Awards	2026	Best Rising Star Couple	with Harit Buayoi	Won	
Kom Chad Luek Awards	2026	Popular Boys' Love Couple	with Harit Buayoi	Nominated	
Kom Chad Luek Awards	2026	Popular Male Actor	Napatsakorn Pingmuang	Nominated	
Lifestyle Asia 50 Icons	2025	Rising Icons	Napatsakorn Pingmuang	Won	
Maya Superstar Idol Awards	2026	Popular Male Couple of the Year	with Harit Buayoi	Nominated	
Maya Superstar Idol Awards	2026	Rookie Male of the Year	Napatsakorn Pingmuang	Nominated	
Maya TV Awards	2025	Male Couple of the Year	with Harit Buayoi	Nominated	
Maya TV Awards	2026	Male Couple of the Year	with Harit Buayoi	Nominated	
Maya TV Awards	2026	Rising Star Male of the Year	Napatsakorn Pingmuang	Nominated	
Mint Awards	2024	Rookie of the Year (Actor)	After Sundown	Nominated	
Nine Entertain Awards	2025	Rising Screen Couple	with Harit Buayoi	Nominated	
Nine Entertain Awards	2026	Couple of the Year	with Harit Buayoi	Nominated	
Nine Entertain Awards	2026	Shining Star of the Year	with Harit Buayoi	Won	
Pattaya International Film Festival	2026	Outstanding BL Actor	with Harit Buayoi	Won	
Praew Awards	2026	Praew's Cover of the Year	Harit Buayoi, Napatsakorn Pingmuang, Matimun Sreeboonrueang and Wannakorn Reungrat	Won	
Sanook Top of the Year	2025	Rising Male Couple	with Harit Buayoi	Nominated	
Sanook Top of the Year	2025	Rising Star	Napatsakorn Pingmuang	Nominated	
SEC Awards	2026	Best Performance in an Asian Series	Napatsakorn Pingmuang	Nominated	
SEC Awards	2026	Favorite Couple/Ship	Khem and Peem	Nominated	
Thailand Box Office Awards	2025	Couple of the Year (Series)	with Harit Buayoi	Nominated	
Thailand Box Office Awards	2025	Actor Series of the Year	Napatsakorn Pingmuang	Nominated	
Thailand Social Awards	2026	Best Entertainment Figures Performance on Social Media – Actor	Napatsakorn Pingmuang	Won	
Thailand Y Content Awards	2025	Best Couple of the Year	with Harit Buayoi	Nominated	
Thailand Y Content Awards	2025	Popular Vote	Napatsakorn Pingmuang	Nominated	
Thailand Y Content Awards	2025	Rising Star of the Year	Napatsakorn Pingmuang	Nominated	
The People Awards	2026	Popular of the Year	with Harit Buayoi	Nominated	
The Viral Hits Awards	2025	Best BL Couple of the Year	with Harit Buayoi	Nominated	
The Viral Hits Awards	2025	Most Popular Rising Star of The Year	Napatsakorn Pingmuang	Won	
Y Entertain Awards	2025	Rising Star Couple	with Harit Buayoi	Nominated	
Y Universe Awards	2025	The Best Partner	with Harit Buayoi	Won	
Y Universe Awards	2025	The Best Couple	with Harit Buayoi	Nominated	
Y Universe Awards	2025	The Best Cuties	Napatsakorn Pingmuang	Nominated	
Y Universe Awards	2025	The Best Leading Actor/Actress	Napatsakorn Pingmuang	Nominated	
Y Universe Awards	2025	The Best Leading Role	Napatsakorn Pingmuang	Won	
Y Universe Awards	2025	Y Iconic Star	Napatsakorn Pingmuang	Nominated	
