= Wannakorn Reungrat =

Thai actor and singer (born 2000)

- วรรณกร เรืองรัตน์
- Wannakorn in October 2024
- Born: 1 August 2000 (age 26); Bangkok, Thailand
- Other names: First (เฟิร์ส), FirstOne (เฟิร์สวัน)
- Education: Chiang Mai University
- Occupations: Actor; singer
- Years active: 2022–present
- Agent: Domundi TV
- Known for: Jet in Khemjira
- Height: 1.76 m (5 ft 9 in)
- Musical career
- Genres: Pop; T-pop
- Label: DMD Music

Wannakorn Reungrat (Thai: วรรณกร เรืองรัตน์; born 1 August 2000), formerly Pornthep Reungrat (Thai: พรเทพ เรืองรัตน์), nicknamed FirstOne (Thai: เฟิร์สวัน), is a Thai actor under Domundi TV and a singer under DMD Music.

He is best known for his role as Jet in Khemjira (2026).

== Early life and education ==
Wannakorn was born on 1 August 2000 in Bangkok. He moved to Nakhon Si Thammarat when he was in the fifth grade (Prathom 5), Phitsanulok in the sixth grade, before settling in Chiang Mai in the seventh grade (Matthayom 1).

FirstOne graduated with a Bachelor of Engineering in Mechanical Engineering from Chiang Mai University.

== Career ==
In 2022, FirstOne appeared on the singing show The Star 2022 on One 31, but did not advance in the competition. FirstOne was invited to join Domundi TV while working as an extra in the series Club Friday Love & Belief: The Seven Year Itch (2022), starring Pruk Panich (Zee).

Domundi director Kittipat Jampa (Aoftion) gave him the name FirstOne, combining his nickname First with one, a homophone of the first syllable in his name Wannakorn. FirstOne shared that both words convey the meaning of being number one and since there are many people also named First, the new name would help people remember him.

FirstOne joined Domundi as a member of DMD Gen 3. He then appeared on the reality show DMD Friendship the Reality, which premiered in December 2023. The show brought together DMD Gen 3 members to develop their skills, such as modelling, singing and acting, while in search for a compatible on-screen partner. In the final episode, he received both the Best Friendship Award and the Best Performance Award.

FirstOne became acting partners with Matimun Sreeboonrueang (Tle) and the duo went on to co-star in the web series Secret Love (2024). FirstOne released his solo single "First Love" in April 2025.

Tle and FirstOne went on to star in Khemjira (2025), playing the roles of Charn and Jet, past life soulmates who help their friend Khemjira break his family curse. Following the success of the series, the cast headlined the Khemjira The Golden Time Concert, held at the Impact Arena on 17–18 January 2026. FirstOne reprised his role as Jet in the special Khemjira Forever (2026).

DMD Music announced that Tle FirstOne would form a vocal duo, releasing their single "กลิ่นฝน (When It Rains)" in June 2026. The song won Most Popular Song at the Feed x Khaosod Awards 2026. In October 2026, FirstOne released his second solo single "8/7", collaborating with producer and songwriter The Toys.

FirstOne is set to star in the upcoming series You(r)tuber, My Merman, and The Scent of Sorrow.

== Discography ==
=== Singles ===
==== As lead artist ====
Year	Title	Ref.
2025	"First Love"	
2026	"8/7"	

==== Collaborations ====
Year	Title	Artist	Ref.
2024	"รักเธอเต็มฟีด (Love Feed)"	DMD Boys	
2024	"ศูนย์รวมความน่ารัก (Cuteness Center)"	DMD Gen3	
2024	"The Way We Want" (feat. Tle & FirstOne)	Three+One	
2025	"ชอบแกล้ง ไม่ได้แกล้งชอบ"	Tle & FirstOne	
2025	"แค่เป็นห่วงเธอ" (feat. Tle & FirstOne) [Live Session]	Ice Sarunyu	
2025	"เธอไม่ชอบฝน (Rainfall)" [Old Days Version]	Dome Jaruwat x Tle FirstOne	
2026	"ขอให้เธอหายดี"	Marr Team x Tle FirstOne	
2026	"จุ๊บเธอ (Jubu Jub)" (feat. DMD Boys)	DMD Cute Boys	
2026	"กลิ่นฝน (When It Rains)"	Tle FirstOne	

==== Soundtrack appearances ====
Year	Title	Album	Ref.
2024	"เริ่มใหม่อีกครั้ง (Start Again)"	To Be Continued OST	
2025	"จากฝัน (Reality)"	Khemjira OST	
2025	"จากนี้จะไม่ปล่อยมือ (With You Always)" (with Tle Matimun)	Khemjira OST	
2026	"เกี่ยวก้อย (Forever Entwined)" (with Keng, Namping, Tle)	Khemjira OST	
2026	"ภพเธอ (Fated)"	Love Upon a Time OST	
2026	"ขาดเธอ (Losing You)" (with Tle Matimun)	Khemjira Forever OST	
2026	"ตลอดกาล (Eternally Yours)" (with Keng, Namping, Tle)	Khemjira Forever OST	

== Filmography ==
=== Television series ===
Year	Title	Role	Network	Notes	Ref.
2022	Club Friday Love & Belief: The Seven Year Itch	Unnamed lover (Leng's friend)	One 31	Cameo (Ep. 2)	
2025	Khemjira	"Jet" Jettana Nakarnkul	One 31, iQIYI	Supporting role	
2026	Khemjira Forever	"Jet" Jettana Nakarnkul	One 31, iQIYI	Supporting role	
2026	The D Dorm	Dohyun	One 31	Guest role (Ep. 10)	
TBA	You(r)tuber	"Khun" Chopkhun		Main role	
TBA	My Merman	Pearl		Main role	
TBA	The Scent of Sorrow	Lieutenant		Supporting role	

=== Television show ===
Year	Title	Network	Notes
2022	The Star 2022	One 31	
2023	DMD Friendship the Reality	Mandee Channel	
2024	Sawatdee Khrap T-Boys!! 今、注目すべきタイのトップアーティストに密着	TV Tokyo, TVer	
2024	DMD Friendship the Reality, It Takes Two	One 31	Ep. 6
2025	T-Pop Stage	Workpoint TV	24 April, 1 May 2025
2025	ตมาเป็น Grow Up to Be	One Playground	Ep. 21 (26 September 2025)
2025	4 ต่อ 4 Celebrity	One 31	Ep. 964 (28 September 2025)
2025	The Wall Song	Workpoint TV	Ep. 272 (20 November 2025)
2025	จริงหรือมั่ว Fact or Fake	One 31	Ep. 5 (1 December 2025)
2025	Goodbye ตายไม่รู้ตัว	Workpoint TV	Ep. 50 (15 December 2025)
2025	DMD Friendship the Reality, The Third Chapter	iQIYI	Ep. 2
2026	4 Podum	One 31	Ep. 10 (21 January 2026)
2026	The Wall Song	Workpoint TV	Ep. 292 (9 April 2026), Ep. 316 (24 September 2026)
2026	แฉ Chae	GMM 25	15 June 2026
2026	T-Pop Stage	Workpoint TV	18 June 2026

=== Web series ===
Year	Title	Role	Notes	Ref.
2024	Secret Love	An	Main role	

=== Music video appearances ===
Year	Title	Artist	Ref.
2022	"ใจเกเร (Jai Gere)" (Original by Nice 2 Meet U)	Oat Pramote	
2024	"เป็นเธอได้ไหม (Can It Be You)"	Tle Matimun	

== Live performances ==
Year	Date	Name	Venue	Ref.
2024	13 January	DMD Land 2: Wondershow	Impact Arena	
2024	21 February	DMD Land in Japan: Wondershow	Tachikawa Stage Garden, Tokyo	
2025	12 January	DMD Gen3 Fan Meeting: Friendship Never Ends	Phenix Grand Ballroom	
2025	30 August	DMD Sport Day	BITEC Live	
2026	17–18 January	Khemjira The Golden Time Concert	Impact Arena	
2026	23 March	DMD World in Japan: Start to Bloom	Toyosu PIT, Tokyo	
2026	2–3 May	DMD Land 3: The Final Land	Impact Arena	
2026	1 August	DMD Sport Day 2026: High School Vibes	Indoor Stadium Huamark	

== Awards and nominations ==
Award nominations for Wannakorn Reungrat
Year	Award	Category	Nominee(s)	Result	Ref.
2025	The Viral Hits Thailand Spotlight Awards 2025	Most Popular Couple	with Matimun Sreeboonrueang	Won	
2026	Y Universe Awards 2025	The Best Partner	with Matimun Sreeboonrueang	Nominated	
2026	Y Universe Awards 2025	The Best Couple	with Matimun Sreeboonrueang	Nominated	
2026	Y Universe Awards 2025	The Best Supportive	Khemjira	Won	
2026	Y Universe Awards 2025	The Best Cuties		Won	
2026	Y Universe Awards 2025	Rising Star		Won	
2026	Nine Entertain Awards 2026	Shining Star of the Year	with Matimun Sreeboonrueang	Nominated	
2026	TOTY Music Awards 2025	Popular Rookie of the Year	"First Love"	Nominated	
2026	Line Melody Music Awards 2025	Black Melody of the Year	"Reality"	Won	
2026	Maya Superstar Idol Awards 2026	Popular Male Couple of the Year	with Matimun Sreeboonrueang	Nominated	
2026	Maya Superstar Idol Awards 2026	Rookie Male of the Year		Nominated	
2026	Kazz Awards 2026	Couple of the Year	with Matimun Sreeboonrueang	Nominated	
2026	Kazz Awards 2026	Youth Choice of the Year (2nd place)		Won	
2026	Kom Chad Luek Awards 2026	Most Popular Thai Pop Singer		Won	
2026	Bangkok Pride Awards 2026	Pride Popular of Y Series Star	with Matimun Sreeboonrueang	Nominated	
2026	Thailand Y Content Awards 2025	Best Couple of the Year	with Matimun Sreeboonrueang	Nominated	
2026	Thailand Y Content Awards 2025	Rising Star of the Year		Won	
2026	Nakarat Awards 2026	Popular Vote	with Matimun Sreeboonrueang	Nominated	
2026	Y Entertain Awards 2026	Y Star on Spotlight of the Year	with Matimun Sreeboonrueang	Won	
2026	Praew Awards 2026	Praew's Cover of the Year	Harit Buayoi, Napatsakorn Pingmuang, Matimun Sreeboonrueang and Wannakorn Reungrat	Won	
2026	Praew Awards 2026	Supporting Actor of the Year	Khemjira (with Matimun Sreeboonrueang)	Won	
2026	Feed x Khaosod Awards 2026	Most Popular Song	"When It Rains"	Won	
2026	Maya TV Awards 2026	Male Couple of the Year	with Matimun Sreeboonrueang	Nominated	
2026	Maya TV Awards 2026	Rising Star Male of the Year		Nominated	
2026	Howe Awards 2026	The Best Couple Award	with Matimun Sreeboonrueang	Nominated	
2026	Howe Awards 2026	Shining Male Award		Won	
