= Harit Buayoi =

Thai actor and model (born 1999)

- หฤษฎ์ บัวย้อย
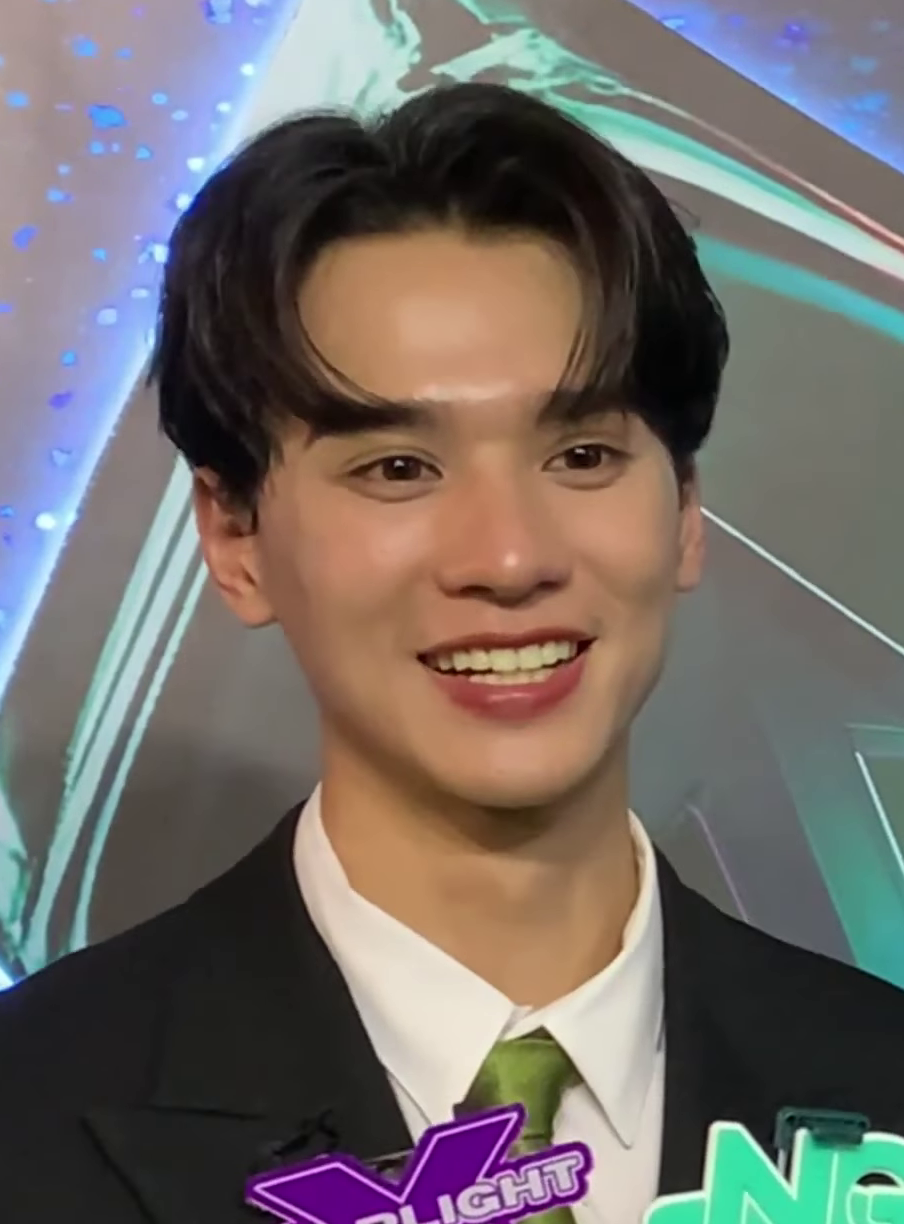
- Harit in November 2024
- Born: 19 August 1999 (age 27); Phayao Province, Thailand
- Other name: Keng (เก่ง)
- Education: University of Phayao (B.Ed.)
- Occupation: Actor
- Years active: 2023–present
- Agent: Domundi TV
- Known for: Jingna in The Paradise of Thorns; Pharan in Khemjira
- Height: 180 cm (5 ft 11 in)

Harit Buayoi (Thai: หฤษฎ์ บัวย้อย; born 19 August 1999), nicknamed Keng (Thai: เก่ง), is a Thai actor under Domundi TV. He is also represented by Red Modelling Thailand. He is best known for his roles in The Paradise of Thorns (2024) and Khemjira (2025).

== Early life and education ==
Harit Buayoi was born on 19 August 1999 in Phayao Province, Thailand. He is of Thai Lue descent. He grew up in a rubber farming family in a small village in Phu Sang district. He has a sister who is older than him by 13 years.

He completed his secondary education at Chiang Kham Wittayakom School. He graduated with a bachelor's degree in Thai Language Education from the University of Phayao in 2024. He had the opportunity to teach at his childhood school, Ban Nong Lao Community School.

== Career ==
Harit competed in the Mister Chinese Chiang Mai 2021, coming in second place. He won in the competition Yee Peng Thepbut Chiang Mai 2022, as well as Mister Yeepeng Popular Vote in 2023.

After learning that his family was burdened with debt, he decided to move to Bangkok to pursue a career in the entertainment industry, hoping to find opportunities to support his family. In 2023, he joined Domundi TV as part of the third generation through the reality show DMD Friendship, where he was awarded the Best Partner Award with Napatsakorn Pingmuang (Namping).

Harit made his breakthrough with his acting debut as Jingna in the film The Paradise of Thorns (2024). He starred in his first lead role in Khemjira (2025), alongside Namping.

== Filmography ==
=== Film ===
Year	Title	Role	Notes	Ref.
2024	The Paradise of Thorns	Jingna	Supporting role	
2025	Diva, La Vie	Alex Kim	Supporting role	

=== Television series ===
Year	Title	Role	Network	Notes	Ref.
2025	Khemjira	"Peem" Pharan Rueangdet / Phawat / Phuchagin	One 31, IQIYI	Main role	
2025	Me and Who	Korn	WeTV	Guest role (Ep. 1, 4–5)	
2025	Zomvivor	Phat	Netflix	Supporting role	
2026	ChermChey	Master	TrueVisions Now	Supporting role	
2026	Khemjira Forever	"Peem" Pharan Rueangdet	One 31, iQIYI	Main role	
TBA	Magic Lover	Lee Likhit		Main role	
TBA	Still Holding Up Like the Moon	"Duean" Daranpob Donprasoppraew / Phumek		Main role	

=== Music video appearances ===
Year	Title	Artist	Ref.
2024	"Heartstopper"	Mabelz Pixxie	
2024	"รักเธอใหม่ได้หรือเปล่า (One More Chance)"	MXFRUIT	

== Discography ==
=== Singles ===
==== Collaborations ====
Year	Title	Artist	Ref.
2024	"Cuteness Center" (ศูนย์รวมความน่ารัก)	DMD Gen 3	
2025	"รักนี้ (Forever)" (InWhite Live Session)	Aof Pongsak x Keng Harit	
2026	"รักฉันจะมั่นคง (Secure)"	Keng Namping x Marr Team	

==== Soundtrack appearances ====
Year	Title	Album	Ref.
2025	"To the Moon"	Rabbit on the Moon OST	
2025	"Be Strong" (ใจจงมั่น) (with Prang Prangthip)	Khemjira OST	
2025	"Mantra" (มนตรา)	Khemjira OST	
2025	"Never Apart" (ทุกชาติภพ) (with Namping Napatsakorn)	Khemjira OST	
2025	"Beast" (as Alex Kim)	Diva, La Vie OST	
2025	"มันส์มากคุณน้า" (with Plaifun Margaret Heng, Takhli Gang, as Alex Kim)	Diva, La Vie OST	
2026	"เกี่ยวก้อย (Forever Entwined)" (with Namping, Tle, FirstOne)	Khemjira OST	
2026	"คู่บุญ (Soulmate)" (with Namping Napatsakorn)	Khemjira Forever OST	
2026	"ตลอดกาล (Eternally Yours)" (with Namping, Tle, FirstOne)	Khemjira Forever OST	

== Awards and nominations ==
Name of the award ceremony, year presented, category, nominee of the award, and the result of the nomination
Award	Year	Category	Nominee/work	Result	Ref.
Bangkok Pride Awards	2026	Pride Popular of Y Series Star	with Napatsakorn Pingmuang	Won	
Feed x Khaosod Awards	2025	Best Chemistry (Popular Vote)	with Napatsakorn Pingmuang	Nominated	
Feed x Khaosod Awards	2026	Best Chemistry of the Year	with Napatsakorn Pingmuang	Won	
Feed x Khaosod Awards	2026	Boys' Love Actor of the Year	Harit Buayoi	Nominated	
Feed x Khaosod Awards	2026	Best Chemistry (Popular Vote)	with Napatsakorn Pingmuang	Nominated	
Feed x Khaosod Awards	2026	Most Popular Male Actor (Popular Vote)	Khemjira	Nominated	
GQ Thailand Men of the Year	2025	Rising Star of the Year	Harit Buayoi	Won	
Howe Awards	2025	Shining Male Award	Harit Buayoi	Nominated	
Howe Awards	2026	The Best Couple Award	with Napatsakorn Pingmuang	Nominated	
Howe Awards	2026	Hottest Actor Award	Harit Buayoi	Nominated	
Kazz Awards	2025	Best Actor of the Year	Harit Buayoi	Nominated	
Kazz Awards	2026	Best Actor of the Year	Harit Buayoi	Nominated	
Kazz Awards	2026	Couple of the Year	with Napatsakorn Pingmuang	Nominated	
Kazz Awards	2026	Youth Choice of the Year (4th place)	Harit Buayoi	Won	
Kom Chad Luek Awards	2025	Best Supporting Actor - Film	Harit Buayoi	Nominated	
Kom Chad Luek Awards	2026	Most Popular Thai Pop Singer	Harit Buayoi	Nominated	
Kom Chad Luek Awards	2026	Popular BL (Boys' Love) Couples	with Napatsakorn Pingmuang	Nominated	
Kom Chad Luek Awards	2026	Best Rising Star Couple	with Napatsakorn Pingmuang	Won	
Kom Chad Luek Awards	2026	Best New Artist	"Mantra"	Won	
Lifestyle Asia 50 Icons	2025	Rising Icons	Harit Buayoi	Won	
Maya Superstar Idol Awards	2026	Popular Male Couple of the Year	with Napatsakorn Pingmuang	Nominated	
Maya Superstar Idol Awards	2026	Best Series Soundtrack of the Year	"Be Strong"	Nominated	
Maya Superstar Idol Awards	2026	Best Actor of the Year	Harit Buayoi	Nominated	
Maya Superstar Idol Awards	2026	Idol of the Year	Harit Buayoi	Nominated	
Maya TV Awards	2025	Rising Star Male of the Year	Harit Buayoi	Won	
Maya TV Awards	2025	Male Couple of the Year	with Napatsakorn Pingmuang	Nominated	
Maya TV Awards	2026	Charming Man of the Year	Harit Buayoi	Nominated	
Maya TV Awards	2026	Popular Vote	Harit Buayoi	Nominated	
Maya TV Awards	2026	Male Couple of the Year	with Napatsakorn Pingmuang	Nominated	
Mchoice & Mint Awards	2025	Best Rookie of the Year	Harit Buayoi	Nominated	
Nine Entertain Awards	2025	Rising Screen Couple	with Napatsakorn Pingmuang	Nominated	
Nine Entertain Awards	2026	People's Favorite	Harit Buayoi	Nominated	
Nine Entertain Awards	2026	Couple of the Year	with Napatsakorn Pingmuang	Nominated	
Nine Entertain Awards	2026	Shining Star of the Year	with Napatsakorn Pingmuang	Won	
Pattaya International Film Festival	2026	Outstanding BL Actor	with Napatsakorn Pingmuang	Won	
Praew Awards	2026	Praew's Cover of the Year	Harit Buayoi, Napatsakorn Pingmuang, Matimun Sreeboonrueang and Wannakorn Reungrat	Won	
Sanook Top of the Year Awards	2025	Rising Star	Harit Buayoi	Nominated	
Sanook Top of the Year Awards	2025	Rising Male Couple	with Napatsakorn Pingmuang	Nominated	
Suphannahong National Film Awards	2025	Best Supporting Actor	Harit Buayoi	Nominated	
T-Pop of the Year Music Awards	2025	Most Popular OST of the Year	"Be Strong"	Nominated	
Thailand Box Office Awards	2025	Couple of the Year (Series)	with Napatsakorn Pingmuang	Nominated	
Thailand Box Office Awards	2025	Actor in a Series of the Year	Harit Buayoi	Nominated	
Thailand Box Office Movie Awards	2024	Supporting Actor of the Year	Harit Buayoi	Nominated	
Thailand Social Awards	2026	Best Entertainment Figures Performance on Social Media – Actor	Harit Buayoi	Won	
Thailand Y Content Awards	2025	Best Couple of the Year	with Napatsakorn Pingmuang	Nominated	
Thailand Y Content Awards	2025	Best Leading Actor	Khemjira	Won	
Thailand Y Content Awards	2025	Popular Vote	Harit Buayoi	Nominated	
Thailand Y Content Awards	2025	Rising Star of the Year	Harit Buayoi	Nominated	
Thailand Y Content Awards	2025	Best Series Soundtrack	"Be Strong"	Nominated	
The People Awards	2026	Popular of the Year	with Napatsakorn Pingmuang	Nominated	
The Viral Hits Awards	2025	Best Viral Creator of the Year	Harit Buayoi	Won	
The Viral Hits Awards	2025	Best BL Actor of the Year	Harit Buayoi	Nominated	
The Viral Hits Awards	2025	Best BL Couple of the Year	with Napatsakorn Pingmuang	Nominated	
TV Gold Awards	2026	Outstanding Leading Actor	Khemjira	Nominated	
Y Entertain Awards	2025	Rising Star Couple	with Napatsakorn Pingmuang	Nominated	
Y Entertain Awards	2026	Best Series OST of the Year	"Be Strong"	Won	
Y Entertain Awards	2026	Leading Boys' Love Star of the Year	Harit Buayoi	Won	
Y Entertain Awards	2026	Prince of Boys' Love	Harit Buayoi	Nominated	
Y Universe Awards	2024	Rising Star	Harit Buayoi	Won	
Y Universe Awards	2025	The Best Character of the Year	Master Pharan (Harit Buayoi)	Won	
Y Universe Awards	2025	The Best Partner	with Napatsakorn Pingmuang	Won	
Y Universe Awards	2025	The Best Couple	with Napatsakorn Pingmuang	Nominated	
Y Universe Awards	2025	The Best Leading Role	Harit Buayoi	Nominated	
Y Universe Awards	2025	The Best Series OST.	"Be Strong"	Nominated	
