= Matimun Sreeboonrueang =

Thai actor and singer (born 1998)

- มติมันท์ ศรีบุญเรือง
- Matimun in October 2024
- Born: 13 September 1998 (age 28); Lamphun, Thailand
- Other name: Tle (เติ้ล)
- Education: Chiang Mai University
- Occupations: Actor; singer
- Years active: 2024–present
- Agent: Domundi TV
- Known for: Charn in Khemjira
- Height: 1.75 m (5 ft 9 in)
- Musical career
- Genres: Pop; T-pop
- Instruments: Vocals; guitar
- Label: DMD Music

TikTok information
- Page: what.if.hub

Matimun Sreeboonrueang (Thai: มติมันท์ ศรีบุญเรือง; born 13 September 1998), nicknamed Tle (Thai: เติ้ล), (Note: RTGS: Toen, Thai pronunciation: [tɤn˥˩]) is a Thai actor under Domundi TV and a singer under DMD Music.

He is best known for his role as Charn in Khemjira (2026).

== Early life and education ==
Matimun was born on 13 September 1998 in Lamphun. His family moved to Nakhon Pathom when he was in kindergarten (Anuban 1). His family settled in Kanchanaburi province to work on their natural rubber plantation around his final year of preschool (Anuban 3).

His paternal grandmother is the younger sister of retired Pol. Lt. Gen. (Note: Abbreviation of Police Lieutenant General (Thai: พลตำรวจโท)) Rewat Klinkesorn, who is a former commissioner of the Royal Thai Police Narcotics Suppression Bureau, former acting commissioner of the Special Branch Bureau, and founder of the Rak Mueang Thai Party. He lived in the same house as his great-uncle until he finished high school (Matthayom 6).

Tle graduated with a Bachelor of Engineering in Electrical Engineering from Chiang Mai University.

== Career ==
Tle began his career in the entertainment industry creating content on TikTok. He was scouted to join Domundi TV by a manager who watched his livestream singing and playing guitar.

He joined Domundi as a member of DMD Gen 3 and was added to the cast of the reality show DMD Friendship the Reality in episode 3. The show brought together DMD Gen 3 members to develop their skills, such as modelling, singing and acting, while in search for a compatible on-screen partner.

Tle released his self-written song "เป็นเธอได้ไหม (Can It Be You)" in October 2024. He became acting partners with Wannakorn Reungrat (FirstOne) and the duo went on to co-star in the web series Secret Love (2024).

Tle and FirstOne went on to star in Khemjira (2025), playing the roles of Charn and Jet, past life soulmates who help their friend Khemjira break his family curse. Following the success of the series, the cast headlined the Khemjira The Golden Time Concert, held at the Impact Arena on 17–18 January 2026. Tle later reprised his role as Charn in the special Khemjira Forever (2026).

DMD Music announced that Tle FirstOne would form a vocal duo, releasing their single "กลิ่นฝน (When It Rains)" in June 2026. The song won Most Popular Song at the Feed x Khaosod Awards 2026.

He is set to star in the upcoming series You(r)tuber, My Merman, and The Scent of Sorrow.

== Discography ==
=== Singles ===
==== As lead artist ====
Year	Title	Ref.
2024	"เป็นเธอได้ไหม (Can It Be You)"	

==== Collaborations ====
Year	Title	Artist	Ref.
2024	"ศูนย์รวมความน่ารัก (Cuteness Center)"	DMD Gen3	
2024	"The Way We Want" (feat. Tle & FirstOne)	Three+One	
2025	"ชอบแกล้ง ไม่ได้แกล้งชอบ"	Tle & FirstOne	
2025	"แค่เป็นห่วงเธอ" (feat. Tle & FirstOne) [Live Session]	Ice Sarunyu	
2025	"เธอไม่ชอบฝน (Rainfall)" [Old Days Version]	Dome Jaruwat x Tle FirstOne	
2026	"ขอให้เธอหายดี"	Marr Team x Tle FirstOne	
2026	"กลิ่นฝน (When It Rains)"	Tle FirstOne	

==== Soundtrack appearances ====
Year	Title	Album	Ref.
2025	"เวทมนตร์ (Magic)"	Khemjira OST	
2025	"จากนี้จะไม่ปล่อยมือ (With You Always)" (with FirstOne)	Khemjira OST	
2026	"เกี่ยวก้อย (Forever Entwined)" (with Keng, Namping, FirstOne)	Khemjira OST	
2026	"เพลงจูบ (Safe Zone)"	Mr. Fanboy OST	
2026	"ขาดเธอ (Losing You)" (with FirstOne)	Khemjira Forever OST	
2026	"ตลอดกาล (Eternally Yours)" (with Keng, Namping, FirstOne)	Khemjira Forever OST	

== Filmography ==
=== Film ===
Year	Title	Role	Notes	Ref.
2026	Detective Conan: Fallen Angel of the Highway	Kazuaki Omae	Voice role, Thai version	

=== Television series ===
Year	Title	Role	Network	Notes	Ref.
2025	Khemjira	"Charn" Charnvit Charoenkiatpricha	One 31, iQIYI	Supporting role	
2026	Khemjira Forever	"Charn" Charnvit Charoenkiatpricha	One 31, iQIYI	Supporting role	
2026	The D Dorm	Delta	One 31	Guest role (Ep. 10)	
TBA	You(r)tuber	"In" Intouch Anametha		Main role	
TBA	My Merman	Kin		Main role	
TBA	The Scent of Sorrow	Inspector		Supporting role	

=== Television show ===
Year	Title	Network	Notes
2024	DMD Friendship the Reality	Mandee Channel	Ep. 3–6
2024	DMD Friendship the Reality, It Takes Two	One 31	Ep. 6
2025	T-Pop Stage	Workpoint TV	1 May 2025
2025	ตมาเป็น Grow Up to Be	One Playground	Ep. 21 (26 September 2025)
2025	4 ต่อ 4 Celebrity	One 31	Ep. 964 (28 September 2025)
2025	The Wall Song	Workpoint TV	Ep. 272 (20 November 2025)
2025	จริงหรือมั่ว Fact or Fake	One 31	Ep. 5 (1 December 2025)
2025	Goodbye ตายไม่รู้ตัว	Workpoint TV	Ep. 50 (15 December 2025)
2025	DMD Friendship the Reality, The Third Chapter	iQIYI	Ep. 2
2026	4 Podum	One 31	Ep. 10 (21 January 2026)
2026	The Wall Song	Workpoint TV	Ep. 292 (9 April 2026), Ep. 316 (24 September 2026)
2026	แฉ Chae	GMM 25	15 June 2026
2026	T-Pop Stage	Workpoint TV	18 June 2026

=== Web series ===
Year	Title	Role	Notes	Ref.
2024	Secret Love	Jin	Main role	

=== Music video appearances ===
Year	Title	Artist	Ref.
2025	"Killa"	Wizzle	
2026	"จุ๊บเธอ (Jubu Jub)" (feat. DMD Boys)	DMD Cute Boys	

== Live performances ==
Year	Date	Name	Venue	Ref.
2024	21 February	DMD Land in Japan: Wondershow	Tachikawa Stage Garden, Tokyo	
2025	12 January	DMD Gen3 Fan Meeting: Friendship Never Ends	Phenix Grand Ballroom	
2025	30 August	DMD Sport Day	BITEC Live	
2026	17–18 January	Khemjira The Golden Time Concert	Impact Arena	
2026	23 March	DMD World in Japan: Start to Bloom	Toyosu PIT, Tokyo	
2026	2–3 May	DMD Land 3: The Final Land	Impact Arena	
2026	1 August	DMD Sport Day 2026: High School Vibes	Indoor Stadium Huamark	

== Awards and nominations ==
Award nominations for Matimun Sreeboonrueang
Year	Award	Category	Nominee(s)	Result	Ref.
2025	The Viral Hits Thailand Spotlight Awards 2025	Most Popular Couple	with Wannakorn Reungrat	Won	
2026	Y Universe Awards 2025	The Best Partner	with Wannakorn Reungrat	Nominated	
2026	Y Universe Awards 2025	The Best Couple	with Wannakorn Reungrat	Nominated	
2026	Y Universe Awards 2025	Rising Star		Nominated	
2026	The Viral Hits Awards 2025	Best Newcomer of the Year	Khemjira	Won	
2026	Nine Entertain Awards 2026	Shining Star of the Year	with Wannakorn Reungrat	Nominated	
2026	Maya Superstar Idol Awards 2026	Popular Male Couple of the Year	with Wannakorn Reungrat	Nominated	
2026	Maya Superstar Idol Awards 2026	Rookie Male of the Year		Won	
2026	Kazz Awards 2026	Couple of the Year	with Wannakorn Reungrat	Nominated	
2026	Kazz Awards 2026	Rising Male of the Year		Won	
2026	Bangkok Pride Awards 2026	Pride Popular of Y Series Star	with Wannakorn Reungrat	Nominated	
2026	Thailand Y Content Awards 2025	Best Couple of the Year	with Wannakorn Reungrat	Nominated	
2026	Thailand Y Content Awards 2025	Best Supporting Actor	Khemjira	Nominated	
2026	Thailand Y Content Awards 2025	Rising Star of the Year		Nominated	
2026	Nakarat Awards 2026	Popular Vote	with Wannakorn Reungrat	Nominated	
2026	Y Entertain Awards 2026	Y Star on Spotlight of the Year	with Wannakorn Reungrat	Won	
2026	Praew Awards 2026	Praew's Cover of the Year	Harit Buayoi, Napatsakorn Pingmuang, Matimun Sreeboonrueang and Wannakorn Reungrat	Won	
2026	Praew Awards 2026	Supporting Actor of the Year	Khemjira (with Wannakorn Reungrat)	Won	
2026	Feed x Khaosod Awards 2026	Most Popular Song	"When It Rains"	Won	
2026	Maya TV Awards 2026	Male Couple of the Year	with Wannakorn Reungrat	Nominated	
2026	Howe Awards 2026	The Best Couple Award	with Wannakorn Reungrat	Nominated	
2026	Howe Awards 2026	Hottest Actor Award		Nominated	
2027	Kazz Awards 2027	Youth Choice of the Year (3rd place)		Won	
