= Maya Awards =

Maya Awards may refer to:

- Maya Awards (Indonesia), an annual Indonesian film awards initiated in 2012
- Maya Awards (Thailand), an annual entertainment award presented by Maya Channel Magazine in Thailand
