= The D Dorm =

2026 Thai television series

- Official series poster
- Thai: หอตัวดี
- Genre: Sitcom
- Written by: Natthapan Sirithanakich; Chanin Panthong; Nontaporn Prapaporn; Wannapa Charoenporn
- Directed by: Seksan Singurai; Natthapan Sirithanakich
- Starring: Ratchapong Anomakiti; Janistar Phomphadungcheep; Jaturong Mokjok
- Music by: Chanoot Ngamsiriporn
- Opening theme: "Ho Tua Di (หอตัวดี)" by Poppy Ratchapong
- Country of origin: Thailand
- Original language: Thai
- No. of episodes: 12

Production
- Executive producers: Takonkiet Viravan; Nipon Pewnen
- Producer: Kittipat Champa
- Cinematography: Tor Bangkhuwat
- Running time: 41–50 minutes
- Production company: Domundi TV

Original release
- Network: One 31; iQIYI; YouTube
- Release: 19 September 2026 – present

The D Dorm Sitcom (Thai: หอตัวดี; RTGS: Ho Tua Di) is a 2026 Thai sitcom television series, starring Ratchapong Anomakiti (Poppy), Janistar Phomphadungcheep (Janis), and Jaturong Mokjok (Rong). The series was directed by Seksan Singurai and Natthapan Sirithanakich, and produced by Domundi TV.

The series premiered on One 31 on 19 September 2026, airing on Saturdays at 18:00 ICT. It was made available for streaming at 19:00 ICT on iQIYI. The series was also made available for streaming through the Mandee Channel on YouTube for select authorized regions. The first episode was made available at 19:00 ICT and the remaining episodes were made available at 20:00 ICT.

== Synopsis ==
Following the death of his estranged grandfather, also called A-Kong (Jaturong Mokjok), Dobby (Ratchapong Anomakiti) inherits the building complex known as the D Dorm and announces his plan to sell it. His plan gets blocked when a potential buyer overhears that the building is haunted by a ghost.

The manager of the dorm, Danis (Janistar Phomphadungcheep), teams up with the residents in order to try to save their home. At the same time, the ghost of A-Kong haunts Dobby and deprives him of sleep. A-Kong promises to leave Dobby alone in exchange for help finding his first love, Gaysorn. Dobby must recruit Danis and the fellow residents to find a relative of Gaysorn that is believed to be another resident in the building.

== Cast and characters ==
=== Main ===
- Ratchapong Anomakiti (Poppy) as Dobby
- Janistar Phomphadungcheep (Janis) as Danis
- Jaturong Mokjok (Rong) as Grandpa Danai Saeja (A-Kong)
- Sudarat Butrprom (Tukky) as Auntie Duang
- Pruk Panich (Zee) as Dollar
- Kornthas Rujeerattanavorapan (Max) as Dax
- Prarinyakorn Kansawa (Yim) as Dolly
- Koraphat Lamnoi (Tutor) as Drip
- Siraphop Manithikhun (Net) as Dawin
- Radchapon Phornpinit (JJ) as Daeng
- Supatat Opas (Arethai) as Dum

=== Guest ===
- Natasit Uareksit (Nat) as Dew (Ep. 3, 6)
- Kittipong Plumpreedaporn (Pue) as Dome (Ep. 4)
- Parnupat Anomakiti (Park) as Din (Ep. 4)
- Worapong Walor (Save) as Dope (Ep. 5)
- Tinnapat Tusnytraitep (Ryujin) as Dape (Ep. 5)
- Chirachart Buspavanich (Patji) as Dump (Ep. 5)
- Supoj Janjareon (Lift) as Surachet (Ep. 5)
- Thanaphum Sestasittikul (Auau) as Don (Ep. 6)
- Jeab Chernyim as Tong (Ep. 6)
- Phirunwat Promrat (Pung) as Duong (Ep. 7)
- Thanutchon Chankaewarmorn (Latte) as Dodo (Ep. 7)
- Pongsaton Sittipan (Kim) as Dim (Ep. 7)
- Thanakrit Chiamchunya (Ohm) as Dom (Ep. 8)
- Chawarin Perdpiriyawong (NuNew) as Disney (Ep. 9)
- Piyamas Monyakul (Pu) as Nampetch / Grandma Gaysorn (Ep. 10)
- Matimun Sreeboonrueang (Tle) as Delta (Ep. 10)
- Wannakorn Reungrat (FirstOne) as Dohyun (Ep. 10)

== Soundtrack ==
The D Dorm Sitcom Soundtrack
No.	Title	Writer(s)	Artist	Length
1.	"Ho Tua Di (หอตัวดี)"	Korn Keeratikaveekarn	Poppy Ratchapong	2:48

== Production ==
A sitcom starring members of Domundi TV titled The D Dorm was first announced at the DMD Line Up 2025+ "Glow Up" event held at the Paragon Hall, Siam Paragon on 20 February 2025. The official cast was revealed at the DMD Line Up 2026: The Rise Continues event on 18 June 2026. A blessing ceremony for good luck was held on 1 September 2026.

== Marketing ==
The series was promoted with The D Dorm Grand Opening press conference event held at EmSphere on 19 September 2026.
