= Nathadej Pititranun =

Thai actor and model

- ณธเดช ปิติตรานันท์
- Born: 25 May 1999 (age 27); Thailand
- Other name: Jeff
- Education: Bangkok University
- Occupations: Actor; model
- Years active: 2020–present
- Known for: Thotsakan in Love Mechanics (2022); Kan in Future (2025); Day in Night Dream (2023-2024)

Nathadej Pititranun (Thai: ณธเดช ปิติตรานันท์; born 25 May 1999), known professionally as Jeff (เจฟ), is a Thai actor and model. He began his entertainment career as a model before moving into acting. He is known for his roles in Love Mechanics (2022), Future (2023) and Night Dream (2023).

== Biography and career ==
Nathadej Pititranun was born on 25 May 1999, in Thailand. He studied at Bangkok University in the Faculty of Information Technology and Innovation. Before beginning his acting career, he worked as a model. He later joined Rookie Thailand.

In October 2020, Jeff was introduced as one of six new actors of the production company and agency Rookie Thailand. Jeff made his acting debut in Love Mechanics (2022), which was broadcast on WeTV, portraying Thotsakan. In the same year, he appeared on the program Love or Lie. In 2023, he appeared in the series Future, broadcast on MCOT, as part of the main cast. In 2023 and 2024, he played Day in Night Dream, which was broadcast on Youku. In 2024, he appeared in the series The Rule, portraying Boem.

== Personal life ==
In December 2025, Jeff made his relationship with singer and actor Nat Thewphaingam public. The relationship attracted attention from the Thai media after the two shared photos and videos together on social media. Natthew later spoke publicly about the relationship on a television program.

== Filmography ==
=== Television series ===
Year	Title	Role	Classification	Network/platform
2022	Love Mechanics	Thotsakan	Supporting cast	WeTV
2023	Future	Kan	Main cast	MCOT
2023 - 2024	Night Dream	Day	Main cast	Youku
2024	The Rule	Boem	Supporting cast	YouTube

== Television programs ==
Year	Title	Role	Notes	Network
2020	SosatSeoulsay	Guest	Episodes 42, 139 and 179	YouTube
2021	GameGangs	Guest	Episodes 1 and 3	YouTube
2022	Love or Lie	Regular member		Rookie Thailand
2022	Talk with Love Mechanics	Guest	Episode 1	Rookie Thailand
2025	แฉ (Chae)	Guest	Episode aired 25 December	GMM 25
2026	โต๊ะหนูแหม่ม	Guest	Episode 1029, aired 9 January	Workpoint TV
2026	The Wall Song (ร้องข้ามกำแพง)	Guest	Episode 284	Workpoint TV
