= Night Dream =

2023 Thai television series

- Thai: คืนฝันของฉันและเธอ
- Genre: Boys' love; Romance
- Based on: Night Dream คืนของฉันฝันของเธอ by Faddist
- Written by: Preayaporn Boonpa
- Directed by: Kanathorn Tabvilai
- Starring: Thanakrit Chiamchunya; Krittawat Suwanich
- Opening theme: "Moon" by Blackbeans
- Country of origin: Thailand
- Original language: Thai
- No. of episodes: 6

Production
- Executive producer: Anan Thanyarat
- Cinematography: Apiwat Wannalertsiri; Apiwat Homchuen
- Running time: 30–53 minutes
- Production company: Rookie Thailand

Original release
- Network: Youku
- Release: 16 December 2023 – 27 January 2024

Night Dream (Thai: คืนของฉันฝันของเธอ; RTGS: Khuen Khong Chan Fan Khong Thoe, lit. 'My Night, Your Dream') is a 2023 Thai boys' love television series, starring Thanakrit Chiamchunya (Ohm) and Krittawat Suwanich (Toosafe), produced by Rookie Thailand. The series was released on Youku.

== Plot ==
Night (Thanakrit Chiamchunya) is a literature student struggling to complete his final project, a story about love. During this period, he meets Dream (Krittawat Suwanich), his former best friend from high school, who disappeared from his life years earlier without explaining why.

The two resume their friendship, and Dream helps Night understand the meaning of love for his project. Gradually, Night realizes that his feelings for his friend go beyond friendship, just as Dream is preparing to leave his life again.

== Cast ==
=== Main ===
- Thanakrit Chiamchunya (Ohm) as Night
- Krittawat Suwanich (Toosafe) as Dream
- Thanchanok Sanguansitthikul (Jina) as Namwan
- Thammasiri Umpujh (Frong) as Zone
- Wongrapee Krusong (Aomsin) as Khun
- Nathadej Pititranun (Jeff) as Day
- Napatsakorn Pingmuang (Namping) as Nat

=== Supporting ===
- A. Dr. Koprapong Kuthikiya
- Sinchai Uearuang
- Nawaporn Supingklat
- Sirisak Phaya
- Thop Thanawat

== Production ==
Night Dream was produced by Rookie Thailand and directed by Ball Kanathorn Tabvilai, with a screenplay by Preayaporn Boonpa and created by Faddist. The story follows the reunion of two school friends, Night and Dream, with their relationship serving as the central element of the narrative. Ohm Thanakrit Chiamchunya and Toosafe Krittawat Suwanich were cast as the protagonists Night and Dream. Promotional material for the series presented the story around the characters' reunion, with Dream running a dessert shop while Night seeks to understand the meaning of love in order to complete his literature project.
