= Your Third =

2026 Thai television series

- Official series poster
- Thai: ที่สามของเธอ
- Genre: Boys' love; Romantic comedy; Drama
- Based on: Your Third by Laila
- Directed by: Thanamin Wongskulphat
- Starring: Kornthas Rujeerattanavorapan; Natasit Uareksit
- Opening theme: "Your Third (ที่สามของเธอ)" by Zom Marie (Ep. 1–9); "One Kiss (จุ๊บทีดิ)" by DiceBlue (Ep. 10–12)
- Ending theme: "Your Third (ที่สามของเธอ)" by Zom Marie (Ep. 1–2); "Just... (แค่ได้ใกล้)" by Nat Natasit (Ep. 3–6); "Love Battery (พลังบวกเคลื่อนที่)" by Max Kornthas (Ep. 7); "One Kiss (จุ๊บทีดิ)" by DiceBlue (Ep. 8–9); "Love Mission (รักเฉพาะกิจ)" by Max, Nat (Ep. 10, 12); "Oops! (เป็นเงี้ยได้ไง)" by Gems Kantapat (Ep. 11)
- Country of origin: Thailand
- Original language: Thai
- No. of episodes: 12

Production
- Executive producer: Kittipat Champa
- Producer: Sunanta Sota
- Cinematography: Picharn Wimolchaiyaporn; Thanakrit Khemasunan
- Running time: 43–64 minutes
- Production companies: Mandee Work; Domundi TV; Copy A Bangkok

Original release
- Network: GMM 25; iQIYI
- Release: 26 July – 11 October 2026

Your Third (Thai: ที่สามของเธอ; RTGS: Thi Sam Khong Thoe) is a 2026 Thai boys' love television series, starring Kornthas Rujeerattanavorapan (Max) and Natasit Uareksit (Nat), based on the novel of the same name by Laila. The series was directed by Thanamin Wongskulphat (Cheewin) and produced by Mandee Work, Domundi TV and Copy A Bangkok.

The series premiered on GMM 25 on 26 July 2026, airing on Sundays at 22:30 ICT. The uncut version was made available for streaming at 23:30 ICT on iQIYI. The series concluded on 11 October 2026.

== Synopsis ==
Sam (Kornthas Rujeerattanavorapan) is a young farm owner who leaves home heartbroken after the person he loved for years ends up with his own brother. He isolates himself on an island in southern Thailand to clear his head. Worried, his brother sends Jam (Natasit Uareksit), his personal assistant, to go after Sam and convince him to come back. In the process, Sam and Jam begin to grow closer in ways neither of them expected.

The title "ที่สามของเธอ" ("third person" or "mistress/lover") refers to the position Sam occupied in his love interest's life, always the third person, never the one chosen.

== Cast and characters ==
=== Main ===
- Kornthas Rujeerattanavorapan (Max) as Traiphop Adisuan (Sarm)
- Natasit Uareksit (Nat) as Jiranat Ikegawa (Jam)

=== Supporting ===
- Watcharapon Konsrap (Few) as Wasin
- Kantapat Dewitpattanapong (Gems) as Lantao
- Thanakrit Chiamchunya (Ohm) as Thicha Adisuan (Song)
- Karnyaphak Pongsak (Sakul) as Namneung Adisuan (Neung)
- Tassapon Vividwarth (Peterpan) as Sattawat Adisuan (Sib)
- Natouch Siripongthong (Fluke) as Pimai
- Oliver Bever as Decha (Sarm's father)
- Sorntast Buangam (Mark) as Thee
- Pongsaton Sittipan (Kim) as Ning-nong

=== Guest ===
- Patiphan Fueangfunuwat (JT) as Payu (Ep. 12)

== Soundtrack ==
No.	Title	Writer(s)	Artist	Length
1.	"Your Third (ที่สามของเธอ)"	Thanee Wongniwatkajorn (Gop Postcard)	Zom Marie	3:12
2.	"Just... (แค่ได้ใกล้)"	Watan-U	Nat Natasit	3:35
3.	"One Kiss (จุ๊บทีดิ)"	Pure Kanin; Jeaniich	DiceBlue	3:11
4.	"Love Battery (พลังบวกเคลื่อนที่)"	Sam Samuel; Baby Rocky	Max Kornthas	2:53
5.	"Oops! (เป็นเงี้ยได้ไง)"	Watan-U	Gems Kantapat	3:26
6.	"Love Mission (รักเฉพาะกิจ)"	Sam Samuel; Baby Rocky	Max; Nat	2:59

== Production ==
The series was announced by Domundi TV at the DMD Line Up 2025+ "Glow Up" event, held in February 2025. In November 2025, iQIYI confirmed the series as part of its 2026 programming in partnership with Domundi TV. Costume fitting took place on 23 February 2026.
