= Domundi TV =

Thai television production company

Domundi TV Co., Ltd.
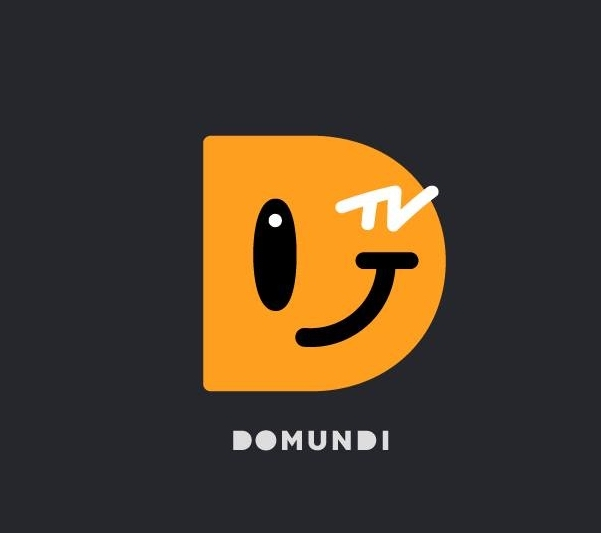
- Native name: ดูมันดิ
- Type: Limited
- Industry: Artist management agency; Television production; Music production
- Founded: 3 August 2016 (10 years ago)
- Headquarters: Bangkok, Thailand
- Key people: Kittipat Jampa
- Parent: Mandee Channel
- Website: Domundi TV's channel on YouTube

Domundi TV is a Thai television production company and talent agency founded in 2016, by director and manager Kittipat Jampa, also known as Aoftion. It produces television series, songs, and music videos, with a primary focus on boys' love (BL) content. The company is best known for producing several BL dramas, including Cutie Pie (2022), Bed Friend (2023), Your Sky (2024), The Next Prince (2025), Khemjira (2025), Duang with You (2026), and Love Upon a Time (2026).

== Background ==
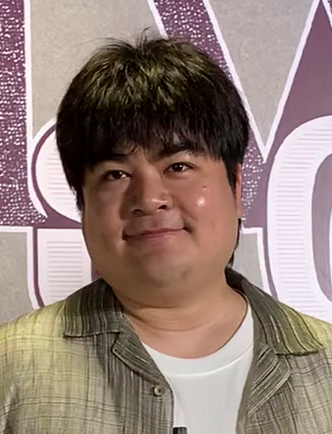
Kittipat Jampa, founder and director

Domundi began its activities in 2016 as a collective of content creators focused on travel and digital entertainment, publishing vlogs and lifestyle videos on YouTube. The original members: known as Mark, Park, Zee, Max, Poppy, and Joss, formed the core of the group.

Starting in 2020, the company shifted its focus to television production, particularly in the boys' love (BL) genre. Its first series in this format was Why R U?, starring Zee Pruk, Saint Suppapong, Tommy Sittichok, and Jimmy Karn. The series aired on Line TV and One 31, and was later made available internationally via Viki.

In 2022, Domundi released its second BL series, Cutie Pie, starring Zee Pruk and NuNew Chawarin, along with Max Kornthas and Nat Natasit. The series aired on Workpoint TV and made available for international streaming on Viki. The series was followed by a spin-off titled Naughty Babe (2023), featuring Max Kornthas and Nat Natasit as the lead couple.

On 17 November 2023, Domundi launched its reality show, DMD Friendship the Reality, which aired weekly for six episodes. The format allowed cast members from the company to get to know each other, while competing in different activities, such as modelling, singing and acting. The members were paired together to test their compatibility in order to form fixed couples (or "ships") for future productions. Due to a tie score, two couples were awarded the Best Partner Award and both pairs were given the opportunity to star in the lead roles of their own series. The first couple was Keng Harit and Namping Napatsakorn, who were cast in their first BL series Khemjira (2025). The other pair was Thomas Teetut and Kong Kongpob, who went on to star in the series Your Sky (2024).

The second season of the reality show, DMD Friendship the Reality, It Takes Two, aired from 6 October to 10 November 2024 on YouTube and One 31. The winning couple from this edition, TeeTee Wanpichit and Por Suppakarn, went on to star in Duang with You (2026). Additional couples formed during the season, Net and JJ, Auau and Save, Jimmy and Ohm, and Tle and FirstOne were also confirmed as leads in future BL series produced by the company.

On 11 June 2025, Domundi officially announced the formation of DEXX, a six-member boy group consisting of Jamessu Supamongkon, Tutor Koraphat, Yim Prarinyakorn, Auau Thanaphum, Por Suppakarn, and TeeTee Wanpichit. The group made its debut on 24 June 2025, with the release of their first single, "Clang Clang".

== List of productions ==
=== Television series ===
| Year | Title | Network | Notes | Ref. |
|---|---|---|---|---|
| 2020 | Why R U? | One 31, Line TV | Starring Zee Pruk, Saint Suppapong, Tommy Sittichok and Jimmy Karn | |
| 2022 | Cutie Pie | Workpoint TV | Starring Zee Pruk and NuNew Chawarin | |
| 2023 | Cutie Pie 2 You | Mandee Channel | Starring Zee Pruk and NuNew Chawarin | |
| 2023 | Bed Friend | One 31, iQIYI | Starring Net Siraphop and Jamessu Supamongkon | |
| 2023 | Naughty Babe | One 31, iQIYI | Spin-off of Cutie Pie; starring Max Kornthas and Nat Natasit | |
| 2023 | The Middleman's Love | One 31, iQIYI | Starring Tutor Koraphat and Yim Prarinyakorn | |
| 2024 | Battle of the Writers | iQIYI | Starring Tutor Koraphat and Yim Prarinyakorn | |
| 2024 | Your Sky | One 31, iQIYI | Starring Thomas Teetut, Kong Kongpob, Auau Thanaphum and Save Worapong | |
| 2025 | Your Sky of Us | One 31, iQIYI | Starring Thomas Teetut, Kong Kongpob, Auau Thanaphum and Save Worapong | |
| 2025 | The Next Prince | One 31, iQIYI | Starring Zee Pruk and NuNew Chawarin | |
| 2025 | Khemjira | One 31, iQIYI | Starring Keng Harit, Namping Napatsakorn, Tle Matimun and FirstOne Wannakorn | |
| 2025 | Me and Who | WeTV | Starring Big Thanakorn and Park Anantadej | |
| 2025 | Zomvivor | Netflix | Starring Weir Sukollawat, Pock Piyathida, Zee Pruk, NuNew Chawarin, Janis Janistar and Tommy Sittichok | |
| 2026 | Duang with You | One 31, iQIYI | Starring TeeTee Wanpichit and Por Suppakarn | |
| 2026 | Love Upon a Time | Workpoint TV, iQIYI | Starring Net Siraphop, JJ Radchapon, Latte Thanutchon and Kim Pongsaton | |
| 2026 | Your Third | GMM 25, iQIYI | Starring Max Kornthas and Nat Natasit | |
| 2026 | Mr. Fanboy | One 31, iQIYI | Starring Auau Thanaphum, Save Worapong and Jamessu Supamongkon | |
| 2026 | The D Dorm | One 31 | Starring Poppy Ratchapong, Zee Pruk, Max Kornthas, Net Siraphop, JJ Radchapon, Tutor Koraphat and Yim Prarinyakorn | |
| 2026 | Khemjira Forever | One 31, iQIYI | Starring Keng Harit, Namping Napatsakorn, Tle Matimun and FirstOne Wannakorn | |

Currently airing

=== Television show ===
| Year | Title | Network | Ref. |
|---|---|---|---|
| 2023 | DMD Friendship the Reality | Mandee Channel | |
| 2024 | DMD Friendship the Reality, It Takes Two | One 31 | |
| 2025 | DMD Friendship the Reality, The Third Chapter | iQIYI | |

== Upcoming TV series ==
On 20 February 2025, Domundi held an event titled DMD Line Up 2025+ "Glow Up" at Siam Paragon in Bangkok, Thailand. The showcase was broadcast live on YouTube and served to announce the company's upcoming BL productions. In addition to revealing the titles, lead actors, and supporting cast, Domundi also released pilot episodes for each announced series. A second, similar event titled DMD Line Up 2026 "The Rise Continues" was held on 18 June 2026.

Announced series
| Title | Notes | Ref. |
|---|---|---|
| You(r)tuber | Starring Tle Matimun and FirstOne Wannakorn | |
| Magic Lover | Starring Thomas Teetut, Kong Kongpob, Keng Harit, Namping Napatsakorn, JT Patiphan and Ohm Thanakrit | |
| Hug E-Lhee: The Musical | Musical format; Zee Pruk and NuNew Chawarin | |
| Did You Know | Starring Claudine Atitaya and Praew Narupornkamol | |
| No.1 Student | Starring Copper Phuriwat and Fifa Thanut | |
| Restart | School drama series in the style of Elite | |
| Unknown Lover | Starring Thomas Teetut and Kong Kongpob | |
| The Scent of Sorrow | Starring Tutor Koraphat, Yim Prarinyakorn, Tle Matimun and FirstOne Wannakorn | |
| Into Racha | Starring North Chatchapon and Otto Sorranan | |
| Zomvivor Chapter 2 | Starring Zee Pruk, NuNew Chawarin, Thomas Teetut, Kong Kongpob, etc. | |
| Still Holding Up Like the Moon | Starring Keng Harit and Namping Napatsakorn | |
| 30 Days of Us | Starring Net Siraphop and JJ Radchapon | |
| 20 Lists | Starring Ryujin Tinnapat and Patji Chirachart | |
| Friend Benefit | Starring TeeTee Wanpichit, Por Suppakarn, Auau Thanaphum, Save Worapong, Jamessu Supamongkon, Tutor Koraphat and Yim Prarinyakorn | |
| Uke | Starring Namping Napatsakorn | |
| Passenger Seat Number X | Starring Zee Pruk and NuNew Chawarin | |
| My Merman | Starring Tle Matimun, FirstOne Wannakorn, Latte Thanutchon, Kim Pongsaton and Pung Phirunwat | |

In post-production or Not yet aired
In production or Filming
Upcoming
On hiatus or Unknown current status

== Artists ==
=== Current ===
==== Generation 1 ====
- Sorntast Buangam (Mark)
- Parnupat Anomakiti (Park)
- Pruk Panich (Zee)
- Kornthas Rujeerattanavorapan (Max)
- Ratchapong Anomakiti (Poppy)
- Sittichok Pueakpoolpol (Tommy)
- Karn Kritsanaphan (Jimmy)

==== Generation 2 ====
- Siraphop Manithikhun (Net)
- Supamongkon Wongwisut (Jamessu)
- Prarinyakorn Kansawa (Yim)
- Koraphat Lamnoi (Tutor)
- Chawarin Perdpiriyawong (NuNew)
- Natasit Uareksit (Nat)

==== Generation 3 ====
- Matimun Sreeboonrueang (Tle)
- Harit Buayoi (Keng)
- Wannakorn Reungrat (FirstOne)
- Thanutchon Chankaewarmorn (Latte)
- Napatsakorn Pingmuang (Namping)
- Teetut Chungmanirat (Thomas)
- Kongpob Jirojmontri (Kong)
- Kantapat Dewitpattanapong (Gems)
- Wanpichit Nimitparkpoom (TeeTee)

==== Generation 4 ====
- Pongsaton Sittipan (Kim)
- Radchapon Phornpinit (JJ)
- Thanakrit Chiamchunya (Ohm)
- Thanaphum Sestasittikul (Auau)
- Suppakarn Jirachotikul (Por)
- Worapong Walor (Save)
- Tinnapat Tusnytraitep (Ryujin)
- Chirachart Buspavanich (Patji)

==== Generation 5 ====
- Sitha Kanchana-alongkorn (Porsche)
- Siraphop Moonsarn (Phupha)
- Phuriwat Chotiratanasak (Copper)
- Phirunwat Promrat (Pung)
- Sorranan Suksawat (Otto)
- Chatchapon Pranotphong (North)
- Thanut Osaithai (Fifa)
- Thanaphat Tansakul (Wave)
- Chnanvichya Roongsiripasert (Pete)

==== New artists ====
- Saran Anantasetthakul (Ton)
- Patiphan Fueangfunuwat (JT)
- Watcharapon Konsrap (Few)
- Thirati Eksathian (Thee)
- Tate Sippakorn Thalerngsakul (Teddy)
- Natpharit Chokrussameesiri (Reeonn)
- Nattanan Jindanon (Nan)
- Nicolas Abiven (Nick)

=== Former ===
- Way-Ar Sangngern (Joss)

== Timeline ==
Timeline of Domundi TV artists

== Accolades ==
Award nominations for Domundi TV
| Year | Award | Category | Nominee(s) | Result | Ref. |
|---|---|---|---|---|---|
| 2026 | The Viral Hits Awards 2025 | Outstanding Creative & Driving Force Company in the Thai Entertainment Industry | Domundi | Won | |
| 2026 | Y Universe Awards 2025 | Special Award: The Spotlight | Domundi | Won | |
| 2026 | Praew Awards 2026 | BL Producer of the Year | Kittipat Jampa | Won | |
