= Noknoi Uraiporn =

Noknoi Uraiporn นกน้อย อุไรพร
- Born: Urai Sihawong; October 11, 1957 (age 68); Sisaket Province, Thailand
- Genres: Luk thung; Mor lam
- Occupation: Singer
- Instrument: Vocal
- Years active: 1970–present
- Labels: Krung Thai Musicaudio; Topline Diamond

Noknoi Uraiporn (Thai: นกน้อย อุไรพร; born 11 October 1957) is a famous Thai Luk thung and Mor lam singer. She is the leader of Mor lam band, Sieang Isan (เสียงอีสาน). She has many popular songs including "Nok Jaa", "Loei Wela Kid Hod", "Mon Phleng Sieng Isan", "Phab Tay Winyan Rak", etc.

== Early life ==
Noknoi was born as Urai Sihawong (Thai: อุไร สีหะวงศ์) on 11 October 1957 in Sisaket Province. She is the daughter of Som and Phan Sihawong.

== Career ==
She started performing in 1970 in a contest. She appeared in many music contests, and often won. After that, she became popular and joined Mor lam band "Phetpinthong" presented by Nophadon Duangporn. In 1975, she released "Nok Ja" and took the stage name Noknoi Uraiporn.

She left Phetpinthong in 1975, and married Maiyakit Chimluang. After that, she founded a Mor Iam band by herself named Sieng Isan. This failed due to lack of performance in a show. She left music for 10 years. She then created another Mor lam band which became popular. It discovered many Mor lam singers including Poyfai Malaiporn, Saengaroon Boonyoo, Siriporn Ampaipong and Maithai Huajaisin. She sang and wrote Mor lam songs, including "Mor lam Glon". Her band appeared around Thailand and other countries. She was called "Queen of Mor lam" of the 21st-century.

== Personal life ==
She was charged with property fraud in 2019, because she was unable to repay debts totalling 3.8 million baht (or $125,000).

== Discography ==
=== Studio albums ===
- Khoi Rak Jak Siang Phin
- Phi Ja
- Songsan Phu Pae
- Hen Jai Phi Jon
- Lam Doen Khon Kaen Prayuk
- Phi Thit Mai Na Tam
- Nok Noi Lam Phloen
- Ro Rak Nakrop
- Sao Rong Namtan (1994)
- Nok Jaa (1996)
- Ya Duan Rak (1997)
- Sao Hang Krueang (1998)
- Dao Mai Luem Din (1999)
- Ba Kai Ti (2000)
- Hua Jai Gai Chon (2001)
- Mon Phleng Siang Isan (2002)
- Yang Hak Yang Koi (2003)
- Thang Hak Thang Jai (2004)
- Mae Luk Onlaweng (2005)
- Namta Mia (2006)
- DJ Jai Ngao (2007)
- Rot Fai Sai Namta (2008)
- Ying Diao Mue Nueng (2009)
- Fa Bo Mi Fon (2010)
- Sao Thao Kap Bao Lao Khao (2012)

=== Singles ===
- "Mae Mai Pai Daeng" (2023)
- "Sawan Ban Na" (2025)
- "Khwan Kaew Ma Su Khing" (ขวัญแก้วมาสู่คิง) – Khemjira OST (2025)

== Filmography ==
=== Film ===
Year	Title	Role	Notes	Ref.
2025	Ta Khon	Thin	Supporting role	

=== Television series ===
Year	Title	Role	Notes	Ref.
2023	Spirit of Magic Mic	Aunt Son	Supporting role	
2024	Thian Son Saeng	Ya Srinuan	Supporting role	
2025	Khemjira	Grandma Si Boonheung	Supporting role	

== Awards ==
She received the 2016 "Hemaraj" award as an "Original Person in Culture".
