= Khemjira =

2025 Thai television series

- Official series poster
- Thai: เขมจิราต้องรอด
- Genre: Romantic drama; Boys' love; Supernatural
- Based on: Khemjira Must Survive by Cali
- Screenplay by: Supachod Kajonsiripong; Jattawa
- Directed by: Panuwat Inthawat; Kittipat Champa; Patarapon To-oun
- Starring: Napatsakorn Pingmuang; Harit Buayoi; Ausadaporn Siriwattanakul; Matimun Sreeboonrueang; Wannakorn Reungrat
- Opening theme: "ผาบมาร" by Aof Surapol
- Composer: Jaithep Raroengjai
- Country of origin: Thailand
- Original languages: Thai; Isan
- No. of episodes: 12

Production
- Producer: Sunanta Sota
- Cinematography: Sarawut Chuparkpanich
- Running time: 65–115 minutes
- Production company: Domundi TV

Original release
- Network: One 31; iQIYI
- Release: 9 August – 25 October 2025

Khemjira (Thai: เขมจิราต้องรอด; RTGS: Khemchira Tong Rot, lit. 'Khemjira Must Survive') is a 2025 Thai boys' love romantic supernatural drama television series, starring Napatsakorn Pingmuang (Namping) and Harit Buayoi (Keng). The series was produced by Domundi TV and premiered on One 31 on 9 August 2025, airing every Saturday at 21:30 ICT. The uncut version was made available for streaming at 22:30 ICT on iQIYI.

A four-episode special titled Khemjira Forever (Thai: เขมจิราต้องรอดตลอดกาล; RTGS: Khemchira Tong Rot Talotkan) premiered on One 31 on 31 October 2026, airing on Saturdays at 20:30 ICT. The uncut version was made available for streaming at 21:30 ICT on iQIYI.

== Synopsis ==
Khemjira (Napatsakorn Pingmuang) is a 20-year-old born with a family curse, in which sons will die before they turn the age of 21. Because of the curse hanging over him, he lives a hard, lonely life; however, despite the struggles he faces, he still maintains a friendly and humble attitude. In order to avoid the curse following him, Khemjira's mother gave him a feminine name to protect him which made his life somewhat a mockery for others to joke about. However, as his twenty-first birthday approaches, the curse gradually intensifies leading to an increasing number of ghosts trying to harm him.

His best friend Jet (Wannakorn Reungrat), who possesses some amateur magical powers, takes him to the province of Ubon Ratchathani to seek help from his shaman teacher, Pharan (Harit Buayoi), a young and skilled white magic shaman who seems reluctant to help. Together, linked by a deeper chain of fates, destiny and curses, Khemjira and his friends discover courage, love, magic and sorrow while trying to solve the mystery surrounding this vengeful curse.

== Cast ==
=== Main ===
- Napatsakorn Pingmuang (Namping) as Khemjira Chandrapisut (Khem)
  - Norraphat Nakadumrongchai (Tham) as Khemjira (young)
  - Janistar Phomphadungcheep (Janis) as Khemmika
- Harit Buayoi (Keng) as Pharan Rueangdet / Phawat / Phuchagin
  - Chirachart Buspavanich (Patji) as Pharan (age 14)
- Ausadaporn Siriwattanakul (Green) as Ramphueng
- Matimun Sreeboonrueang (Tle) as Charnvit Charoenkiatpricha (Charn)
  - Nichapat Sujipinyo (Nycha) as Chayada
- Wannakorn Reungrat (FirstOne) as Jettana Nakarnkul (Jet)
  - Natthamon Jantraviphart (Natty) as Jintana

=== Supporting ===
- Phirunwat Promrat (Pung) as Chayos
- Chayanon Akaradumrongdej (Udon) as Thong / Suea
- Nachawakorn Sirirak (Ryuji) as Ek / Singha
- Manita Chobchuen (Om) as Khaekhai / Kakanang / Khwannari
- Noknoi Uraiporn as Grandma Si Boonheung
- Penpetch Benyakul (Jab) as Phra Phinyo / Pawin
- Arisara Wongchalee (Fresh) as Phao / Chanya
- Puri Hiranprueck as Phat / Wiraphat
- Somchai Kemglad (Tao) as Phra Yao Sing
- Rhatha Phongam (Ying) as Ketkaew
- Krittanai Asanprakit (Nammon) as Phakhaphong (Phong)
- Kanticha Chumma (Ticha) as Phrima (Prim)
- Jennis Oprasert as Jane (Jettana's older sister)
- Siraphop Manithikhun (Net) as Kachen Erdoğan

=== Guest ===
- Yasaka Chaisorn as Grand Master Sek
- Theerayut Pratyabamrung as Monk Kasem
- Boonsong Nakphoo (Sueb) as Uncle Chai
- Suthida Chantrabut as Aunt Kaew
- Pradit Prasartthong (Tua) as Village Headman Chang
- Sarayut Phetsamrit (Eddy) as Worn
- Thanyarat Praditthaen as Rae
- Porntip Kitdamrongchai (Jewly) as Mint
- Jidapa Phonrojpanya (Tontoei) as Praemai (Prae)
- Napat Rueangchaisiwawet (Perth) as Techathorn (Te)
- Phankarat Ngamdan (Nato) as Kornkan (Korn)
- Chawakorn Horsaengchai (Phone) as Phudit (Phu)
- Patarapon To-oun (Ron) as Mountain Lord Phuchong
- Thanatphong Charurangsimes (Nutt) as Big
- Ratchaneekorn Jantaharn as Earn
- Sorntast Buangam (Mark) as Kla
- Himawari Tajiri as Krongkwan

== Original soundtrack ==
Khemjira Soundtrack
No.	Title	Writer(s)	Artist	Length
1.	"Be Strong" (ใจจงมั่น)	YoYo (Thirayu Lamprasert)	Prang Prangthip; Keng Harit	4:11
2.	"Phap Man" (ผาบมาร)	Kriangdet Phonthawee	Aof Surapol	1:31
3.	"Ko Tam" (โกดำ)	Wasan17	Sayamo	4:34
4.	"Hom Khwan (Soraphan)" (โฮมขวัญ (สรภัญญ์))	Jeab Nisa	Aof Surapol	5:24
5.	"Hom Khwan" (โฮมขวัญ)	Jeab Nisa	Aof Surapol	3:30
6.	"Suppose" (สมมติ)	Amp Achariya Dulyapaiboon	Namping Napatsakorn	3:44
7.	"Mantra" (มนตรา)	Amp Achariya Dulyapaiboon	Keng Harit	3:40
8.	"Khwan Kaew Ma Su Khing" (ขวัญแก้วมาสู่คิง)	Jeab Nisa; Noknoi Uraiporn	Noknoi Uraiporn	6:34
9.	"You Must Encounter" (เธอต้องเจอ)	Suwatchai Suttirat; Pharueng Yangyuen	Green Ausadaporn	3:35
10.	"Magic" (เวทมนตร์)	Amp Achariya Dulyapaiboon	Tle Matimun	3:35
11.	"Reality" (จากฝัน)	Amp Achariya Dulyapaiboon	FirstOne	3:22
12.	"Never Apart" (ทุกชาติพบ)	Gop Postcard; Earthernative	Keng; Namping	4:00
13.	"With You Always" (จากนี้จะไม่ปล่อยมือ)	Thutz Chandakul; Jeaniich; Pure Kanin	Tle; FirstOne	3:48
14.	"Forever Entwined" (เกี่ยวก้อย)	Pure Kanin; Jeaniich	Keng; Namping; Tle; FirstOne	4:56

=== Khemjira Forever ===
Khemjira Forever Soundtrack
No.	Title	Writer(s)	Artist	Length
1.	"Khong Hak" (คองฮัก)	Phleng Mina	Ble Patumrach; Parn Thanaporn	3:39
2.	"Soulmate" (คู่บุญ)	Amp Achariya Dulyapaiboon	Keng; Namping	3:44
3.	"Losing You" (ขาดเธอ)	Pure Kanin; Jeaniich	Tle; FirstOne	3:26
4.	"Eternally Yours" (ตลอดกาล)	Watan-U	Keng; Namping; Tle; FirstOne	3:54

== Production ==
Khemjira was first announced in October 2023 by Tumi Tuma, starring Suppacheep Chanapai and Krit Songdechakraiwut. In 2024 the production team changed to Domundi TV and Mandee, with Harit Buayoi and Napatsakorn Pingmuang as the new main leads, and an official pilot was released on 6 June 2024. A blessing ceremony for good luck was held at Wat Bangchak in Pak Kret district, Nonthaburi on 31 October 2024. Principal photography began on 12 November 2024 and concluded on 3 October 2025. While the show was primarily set in Ubon Ratchathani, the series was also filmed in different provinces across Thailand.

== Marketing ==
Khemjira Homecoming press conference and premiere screening for the first episode was held at the Paragon Hall, Siam Paragon on 3 August 2025. The event featured Isan culture, with the cast dressed up in traditional Thai attire, as well a special show performed by mor lam singer Noknoi Uraiporn, who plays Grandma Si Boonheung in the series.

Following the release of the third episode, the cast held the Khemjira busking event around Siam Square on 24 August 2025. Khemjira Ep 7: Temple Fair Screening was held at the MGI Hall, Bravo BKK in Bangkok on 20 September 2025. A screening of the eighth episode, presented by iQIYI, was held at the MCC Hall, The Mall Lifestore Bangkae on 27 September 2025.

For the series finale, Khemjira's Final Blessing event was held at Union Hall, Union Mall on 25 October 2025. The event began with a dance procession and a merit-making ceremony. In addition to the screening of the final episode, the cast performed songs from the original soundtrack.

Following the success of the series, the cast went on to perform at the Khemjira The Golden Time Concert, held at the Impact Arena on 17–18 January 2026. The concert also featured performances by artists from the soundtrack, including Prang Prangthip, Aof Surapol, and Sayamo, as well as guest performances by Jeff Satur, Milli, Ink Waruntorn, and Bowkylion. Tickets for the first show sold out in under 3 minutes, so a second date was added. The concert also sparked a trend of wearing Thai silk, with the dress code "Rooted in Thai, Rising to the World", in keeping with the focus of Thai culture and beliefs integrated in the series.

== Accolades ==
Name of award ceremony, year presented, award category, nominee of award, and result of nomination
Award	Year	Category	Nominee/work	Result	Ref.
Bangkok Pride Awards	2026	Pride Popular of Series/Drama (BL)	Khemjira	Won	
Bangkok Pride Awards	2026	Pride Popular of Y Series Star	Napatsakorn Pingmuang and Harit Buayoi	Won	
Bangkok Pride Awards	2026	Pride Popular of Y Series Star	Matimun Sreeboonrueang and Wannakorn Reungrat	Nominated	
Feed x Khaosod Awards	2025	Best Chemistry (Popular Vote)	Napatsakorn Pingmuang and Harit Buayoi	Nominated	
Feed x Khaosod Awards	2026	Best Chemistry of the Year	Napatsakorn Pingmuang and Harit Buayoi	Won	
Feed x Khaosod Awards	2026	Boys' Love Actor of the Year	Harit Buayoi	Nominated	
Feed x Khaosod Awards	2026	Boys' Love–Girls' Love Director of the Year	Panuwat Inthawat	Nominated	
Feed x Khaosod Awards	2026	Top-Tier BL Series of the Year	Khemjira	Nominated	
Feed x Khaosod Awards	2026	Best Chemistry (Popular Vote)	Napatsakorn Pingmuang and Harit Buayoi	Nominated	
Feed x Khaosod Awards	2026	Most Popular Male Actor (Popular Vote)	Harit Buayoi	Nominated	
Feed x Khaosod Awards	2026	Most Popular Series/Drama (Popular Vote)	Khemjira	Nominated	
Howe Awards	2025	Hottest Trending of the Year	Khemjira	Won	
Howe Awards	2025	Shining Male Award	Harit Buayoi	Nominated	
Howe Awards	2026	Hottest Series Award	Khemjira	Nominated	
Howe Awards	2026	The Best Couple Award	Harit Buayoi and Napatsakorn Pingmuang	Nominated	
Howe Awards	2026	The Best Couple Award	Matimun Sreeboonrueang and Wannakorn Reungrat	Nominated	
Howe Awards	2026	Hottest Actor Award	Harit Buayoi	Nominated	
Howe Awards	2026	Hottest Actor Award	Matimun Sreeboonrueang	Nominated	
Howe Awards	2026	Shining Male Award	Napatsakorn Pingmuang	Nominated	
Howe Awards	2026	Shining Male Award	Wannakorn Reungrat	Won	
Kazz Awards	2026	Series of the Year	Khemjira	Nominated	
Kazz Awards	2026	Best Actor of the Year	Harit Buayoi	Nominated	
Kazz Awards	2026	Couple of the Year	Napatsakorn Pingmuang and Harit Buayoi	Nominated	
Kazz Awards	2026	Couple of the Year	Matimun Sreeboonrueang and Wannakorn Reungrat	Nominated	
Kazz Awards	2026	Popular Male Teenage Award	Napatsakorn Pingmuang	Won	
Kazz Awards	2026	Viral on Social Media	Khemjira	Won	
Kazz Awards	2026	Youth Choice of the Year	Wannakorn Reungrat (2nd place)	Won	
Kazz Awards	2026	Youth Choice of the Year	Harit Buayoi (4th place)	Won	
Kazz Awards	2026	Youth Choice of the Year	Napatsakorn Pingmuang (5th place)	Won	
Kom Chad Luek Awards	2026	Most Popular Drama – Series	Khemjira	Nominated	
Kom Chad Luek Awards	2026	Popular Male Actor	Napatsakorn Pingmuang	Nominated	
Kom Chad Luek Awards	2026	Popular BL (Boys' Love) Couples	Napatsakorn Pingmuang and Harit Buayoi	Nominated	
Kom Chad Luek Awards	2026	Best Rising Star Couple	Napatsakorn Pingmuang and Harit Buayoi	Won	
Kom Chad Luek Awards	2026	Best New Artist	"Mantra"	Won	
Line Melody Music Awards	2025	Black Melody of the Year	"Reality"	Won	
Maya Superstar Idol Awards	2026	Popular Male Couple of the Year	Napatsakorn Pingmuang and Harit Buayoi	Nominated	
Maya Superstar Idol Awards	2026	Popular Male Couple of the Year	Matimun Sreeboonrueang and Wannakorn Reungrat	Nominated	
Maya Superstar Idol Awards	2026	Rookie Male of the Year	Napatsakorn Pingmuang	Nominated	
Maya Superstar Idol Awards	2026	Rookie Male of the Year	Wannakorn Reungrat	Nominated	
Maya Superstar Idol Awards	2026	Rookie Male of the Year	Matimun Sreeboonrueang	Won	
Maya Superstar Idol Awards	2026	Best Series of the Year	Khemjira	Nominated	
Maya Superstar Idol Awards	2026	Best Series Soundtrack of the Year	"Be Strong"	Nominated	
Maya Superstar Idol Awards	2026	Best Actor of the Year	Harit Buayoi	Nominated	
Maya TV Awards	2025	Hottest Series of the Year	Khemjira	Won	
Maya TV Awards	2025	Male Couple of the Year	Napatsakorn Pingmuang and Harit Buayoi	Nominated	
Maya TV Awards	2025	Rising Star Male of the Year	Harit Buayoi	Won	
Maya TV Awards	2026	Male Couple of the Year	Napatsakorn Pingmuang and Harit Buayoi	Nominated	
Maya TV Awards	2026	Male Couple of the Year	Matimun Sreeboonrueang and Wannakorn Reungrat	Nominated	
Maya TV Awards	2026	Rising Star Male of the Year	Napatsakorn Pingmuang	Nominated	
Maya TV Awards	2026	Rising Star Male of the Year	Wannakorn Reungrat	Nominated	
Mchoice & Mint Awards	2025	Phenomenon of the Year	Khemjira	Won	
Nataraja Awards	2025	Best Drama (Short Form)	Khemjira	Nominated	
Nataraja Awards	2025	Best Screenplay (Short Form)	Supachod Kajonsiripong	Nominated	
Nataraja Awards	2025	Best Supporting Actress (Short Form)	Janistar Phomphadungcheep	Nominated	
Nataraja Awards	2025	Best Art Direction	Ctrl-V Art Group, Worawut Saengfa	Nominated	
Nataraja Awards	2025	Best Cinematography	Sarawut Chuparkpanich	Nominated	
Nataraja Awards	2025	Best Costume	Natthapong Khiaosaat	Nominated	
Nataraja Awards	2025	Best Editing	Chankanet Leksomboon, Nisarat Meechok, Peerawit Angkaria, Asamaporn Samakphan, Mitpracha Outtaros	Nominated	
Nataraja Awards	2025	Best Visual Effects	Human Farm VFX Studio, MN Ninety One, VelCurve Post-Production	Nominated	
Nine Entertain Awards	2025	Rising Screen Couple	Napatsakorn Pingmuang and Harit Buayoi	Nominated	
Nine Entertain Awards	2026	Couple of the Year	Napatsakorn Pingmuang and Harit Buayoi	Nominated	
Nine Entertain Awards	2026	Shining Star of the Year	Napatsakorn Pingmuang and Harit Buayoi	Won	
Nine Entertain Awards	2026	Drama–Series of the Year	Khemjira	Nominated	
Pattaya International Film Festival	2026	Outstanding BL Actor	Harit Buayoi and Napatsakorn Pingmuang	Won	
Pattaya International Film Festival	2026	Outstanding BL Series	Khemjira	Won	
Praew Awards	2026	Praew's Cover of the Year	Harit Buayoi, Napatsakorn Pingmuang, Matimun Sreeboonrueang and Wannakorn Reungrat	Won	
Praew Awards	2026	Supporting Actor of the Year	Matimun Sreeboonrueang and Wannakorn Reungrat	Won	
Sanook Top of the Year Awards	2025	Best BL Series	Khemjira	Nominated	
Sanook Top of the Year Awards	2025	Rising Male Couple	Napatsakorn Pingmuang and Harit Buayoi	Nominated	
Sanook Top of the Year Awards	2025	Rising Star	Napatsakorn Pingmuang	Nominated	
Sanook Top of the Year Awards	2025	Rising Star	Harit Buayoi	Nominated	
SEC Awards	2026	Best LGBTQ+ Series	Khemjira	Nominated	
SEC Awards	2026	Best Performance in an Asian Series	Napatsakorn Pingmuang	Nominated	
SEC Awards	2026	Favorite Couple/Ship	Khem and Peem	Nominated	
T-Pop of the Year Music Awards	2025	Most Popular OST of the Year	"Be Strong"	Nominated	
Thailand Box Office Awards	2025	Series of the Year (BL)	Khemjira	Nominated	
Thailand Box Office Awards	2025	Best Series Production Design	Khemjira	Won	
Thailand Box Office Awards	2025	Best Series Script	Khemjira	Won	
Thailand Box Office Awards	2025	Director of the Year (Series)	Panuwat Inthawat, Kittipat Champa and Patarapon To-oun	Nominated	
Thailand Box Office Awards	2025	Couple of the Year (Series)	Napatsakorn Pingmuang and Harit Buayoi	Nominated	
Thailand Box Office Awards	2025	Actor in a Series of the Year	Harit Buayoi	Nominated	
Thailand Box Office Awards	2025	Actor in a Series of the Year	Napatsakorn Pingmuang	Nominated	
Thailand Social Awards	2026	Best Content Performance on Social Media – Series	Khemjira	Won	
Thailand Social Awards	2026	Best Entertainment Figures Performance on Social Media – Actor	Harit Buayoi	Won	
Thailand Social Awards	2026	Best Entertainment Figures Performance on Social Media – Actor	Napatsakorn Pingmuang	Won	
Thailand Y Content Awards	2025	Best Series	Khemjira	Won	
Thailand Y Content Awards	2025	Best Director	Panuwat Inthawat, Kittipat Champa, Patarapon To-oun	Nominated	
Thailand Y Content Awards	2025	Best Leading Actor	Harit Buayoi	Won	
Thailand Y Content Awards	2025	Best Production Design	Khemjira	Nominated	
Thailand Y Content Awards	2025	Best Promotion of Thai Culture	Khemjira	Won	
Thailand Y Content Awards	2025	Best Promotion of Thai Tourism	Khemjira	Nominated	
Thailand Y Content Awards	2025	Best Series Soundtrack	"Be Strong"	Nominated	
Thailand Y Content Awards	2025	Best Special Effects	Khemjira	Won	
Thailand Y Content Awards	2025	Best Supporting Actor	Matimun Sreeboonrueang	Nominated	
Thailand Y Content Awards	2025	Best Supporting Actress	Ausadaporn Siriwattanakul	Nominated	
The Viral Hits Awards	2025	Best BL Series of the Year	Khemjira	Won	
The Viral Hits Awards	2025	Best Newcomer of the Year	Matimun Sreeboonrueang	Won	
The Viral Hits Awards	2025	Best Newcomer of the Year	Phirunwat Promrat	Nominated	
The Viral Hits Awards	2025	Best BL Couple of the Year	Napatsakorn Pingmuang and Harit Buayoi	Nominated	
The Viral Hits Awards	2025	Best BL Actor of the Year	Harit Buayoi	Nominated	
The Viral Hits Awards	2025	Most Popular Rising Star of The Year	Napatsakorn Pingmuang	Won	
The Viral Hits Thailand Spotlight Awards	2025	Most Popular Couple	Matimun Sreeboonrueang and Wannakorn Reungrat	Won	
The Viral Hits Thailand Spotlight Awards	2025	Best New Actor	Phirunwat Promrat	Won	
TV Gold Awards	2026	Outstanding Art Direction in a Drama	Khemjira	Won	
TV Gold Awards	2026	Outstanding Director	Panuwat Inthawat	Nominated	
TV Gold Awards	2026	Outstanding Drama	Khemjira	Nominated	
TV Gold Awards	2026	Outstanding Leading Actor	Harit Buayoi	Nominated	
TV Gold Awards	2026	Outstanding Screenplay	Supachod Kajonsiripong	Nominated	
Y Entertain Awards	2025	Rising Star Couple	Napatsakorn Pingmuang and Harit Buayoi	Nominated	
Y Entertain Awards	2026	Best BL Series of the Year	Khemjira	Won	
Y Entertain Awards	2026	Best Creative Team of the Year	Khemjira	Nominated	
Y Entertain Awards	2026	Best Series OST of the Year	"Be Strong"	Won	
Y Entertain Awards	2026	Best Y Series Director of the Year	Panuwat Inthawat	Nominated	
Y Entertain Awards	2026	Leading Boys' Love Star of the Year	Harit Buayoi	Won	
Y Entertain Awards	2026	Prince of Boys' Love	Harit Buayoi	Nominated	
Y Entertain Awards	2026	Y Star on Spotlight of the Year	Matimun Sreeboonrueang and Wannakorn Reungrat	Won	
Y Universe Awards	2024	The Best Coming Soon	Khemjira	Nominated	
Y Universe Awards	2024	The Best Noticeable	Khemjira	Won	
Y Universe Awards	2025	The Best Y Series	Khemjira	Won	
Y Universe Awards	2025	The Best BL Series	Khemjira	Nominated	
Y Universe Awards	2025	The Best Series	Khemjira	Won	
Y Universe Awards	2025	The Best Cinematography	Khemjira	Won	
Y Universe Awards	2025	The Best Editing	Khemjira	Won	
Y Universe Awards	2025	The Best Special Effects	Khemjira	Won	
Y Universe Awards	2025	The Best Costume Design	Khemjira	Nominated	
Y Universe Awards	2025	The Best Production	Khemjira	Nominated	
Y Universe Awards	2025	The Best Series Script	Khemjira	Nominated	
Y Universe Awards	2025	The Best Series Director	Panuwat Inthawat, Kittipat Champa and Patarapon To-oun	Nominated	
Y Universe Awards	2025	The Best Character of the Year	Master Pharan (Harit Buayoi)	Won	
Y Universe Awards	2025	The Best Partner	Napatsakorn Pingmuang and Harit Buayoi	Won	
Y Universe Awards	2025	The Best Partner	Matimun Sreeboonrueang and Wannakorn Reungrat	Nominated	
Y Universe Awards	2025	The Best Supporting Actor	Ausadaporn Siriwattanakul	Won	
Y Universe Awards	2025	The Best Couple	Napatsakorn Pingmuang and Harit Buayoi	Nominated	
Y Universe Awards	2025	The Best Couple	Matimun Sreeboonrueang and Wannakorn Reungrat	Nominated	
Y Universe Awards	2025	The Best Leading Actor/Actress	Harit Buayoi	Nominated	
Y Universe Awards	2025	The Best Leading Actor/Actress	Napatsakorn Pingmuang	Nominated	
Y Universe Awards	2025	The Best Leading Role	Harit Buayoi	Nominated	
Y Universe Awards	2025	The Best Leading Role	Napatsakorn Pingmuang	Won	
Y Universe Awards	2025	The Best Supportive	Janistar Phomphadungcheep	Nominated	
Y Universe Awards	2025	The Best Supportive	Wannakorn Reungrat	Won	
Y Universe Awards	2025	The Best Series OST.	"Be Strong"	Nominated	
Y Universe Awards	2025	The Best Original Song for a Series	"Be Strong"	Nominated	
Y Universe Awards	2025	The Best Cuties	Napatsakorn Pingmuang	Nominated	
Y Universe Awards	2025	The Best Cuties	Wannakorn Reungrat	Won	
Y Universe Awards	2025	Rising Star	Matimun Sreeboonrueang	Nominated	
Y Universe Awards	2025	Rising Star	Wannakorn Reungrat	Won	
Y Universe Awards	2025	Y Iconic Star	Napatsakorn Pingmuang	Nominated	
