= Natasit Uareksit =

Thai actor and singer (born 2002)

- ณฐสิชณ์ เอื้อเอกสิชฌ์
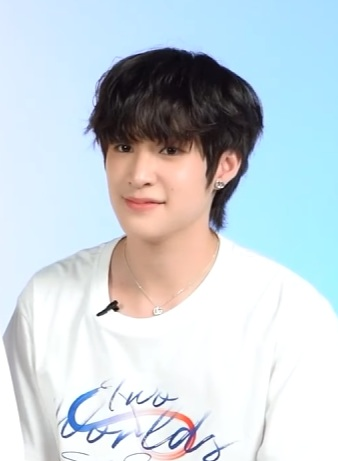
- Natasitt in April 2024
- Born: 8 August 2002 (age 24); Bangkok, Thailand
- Other name: Nat (ณฐ)
- Education: Thammasat University
- Occupations: Actor; singer
- Years active: 2020–present
- Agent: Domundi TV
- Height: 1.65 m (5 ft 5 in)

Natasit Uareksit (Thai: ณฐสิชณ์ เอื้อเอกสิชฌ์; born 8 August 2002), also spelled Natasitt Uareksit, nicknamed Nat (Thai: ณฐ), is a Thai actor and singer. He is best known for his roles in Why R U? (2020), Y-Destiny (2021), Cutie Pie (2022), Naughty Babe (2023), Two Worlds (2024), and Your Third (2026).

== Early life and education ==
Nat was born in Bangkok, Thailand on 8 August 2002. He attended Assumption College for elementary school before moving to Anglo-Chinese School in Singapore. After coming back to Bangkok, he got his bachelor's degree at Thammasat Design School. While in school, he was a member of the Jaturamitr Band, along with Bunyapol Likhitamnuayporn (Ben) and Nonthakorn Chatchue (Rossi).

== Career ==
In 2020, he made his acting debut as Blue, a supporting role in Why R U? alongside Kornthas Rujeerattanavorapan (Max). In 2021, he got his first lead role in Y-Destiny.

In 2022, he played Thacha Wongtheerawit (Khondiao) in Cutie Pie. In 2023, he played the same role again in Naughty Babe, and also made a guest appearance in the Korean remake of Why R U?. In 2024, he starred as Khram in Two Worlds.

== Filmography ==
=== Television series ===
Year	Title	Role	Network	Notes	Ref.
2020	Why R U?	Blue	Line TV, One 31	Supporting role	
2020	You Never Eat Alone	Nuea	AIS Play	Guest role	
2021	Y-Destiny	Nuea	AIS Play	Main role	
2021	Close Friend	Mini	Viu	Main role	
2022	Cutie Pie	"Khondiao" Thacha Wongtheerawit	Workpoint TV	Supporting role	
2022	War of Y		AIS Play	Guest role	
2023	Naughty Babe	"Khondiao" Thacha Wongtheerawit	One 31, iQIYI	Main role	
2024	Two Worlds	Khram	iQIYI	Main role	
2025	Suntiny	Nuea	iQIYI	Main role	
2025	Zomvivor	Night	Netflix	Main role	
2026	Duang with You	PK	One31, iQIYI	Guest role	
2026	ChermChey	Nine	Truevisions Now	Supporting role	
2026	Your Third	"Jam" Jiranat Ikegawa	GMM 25	Main role	
2026	The D Dorm	Dew	One 31	Guest role (Ep. 3, 6)	
TBA	Illusion	Tae		Main role	

=== Web series ===
Year	Title	Role	Notes	Ref.
2023	Why R U?	Himself	Guest role (Ep. 1)	
2023	Y Journey: Stay Like a Local		Main role	

== Awards and nominations ==
Year	Award	Category	Nominee	Result	Ref.
2022	Y Universe Awards	Best Cuties	Natasit Uareksit	Nominated	
