= Payback (Thai TV series) =

2026 Thai television series

- Official series poster
- Also known as: Payback: The Series
- Genre: Drama; Boys' love
- Based on: Payback by Samk and Fujoking
- Screenplay by: Isaree Siriwankulthon (Sammon); Amnard Thangsomboon
- Directed by: Pongchaiphat Sethanand
- Starring: Thanakorn Wichanukhor; Jarukit Kaewmoonrueang; Paramee Thesdaroon; Thanawat Shinawatra
- Opening theme: "Payback (ทวงคืน)" by Sam Sermsartr
- Ending theme: "Until You (เธอทำให้รู้)" by Chear Nathaphon
- Country of origin: Thailand
- Original language: Thai
- No. of episodes: 10

Production
- Producer: Rungrapee Kingkaew
- Cinematography: Nithiwath Samanlor; Peerawat Sangklang
- Running time: 44–88 minutes
- Production companies: Raize Up Production; A Plan International Group; KidariStudio; Copus Japan; Rakuten TV

Original release
- Network: One 31; OneD (Thailand); iQIYI (International)
- Release: 30 May – 1 August 2026

Payback is a 2026 Thai boys' love drama television series directed by Pongchaiphat Sethanand (Woodie), starring Thanakorn Wichanukhor (Minlee) and Jarukit Kaewmoonrueang (Toptap). The series is based on the South Korean webtoon of the same name written by Samk, illustrated by Fujoking.

It aired every Saturday at 22:30 ICT on One 31 from 30 May to 1 August 2026. The uncut version was made available for streaming at 23:30 ICT on iQIYI. The series was also made available for streaming on the OneD app, Rakuten TV (Japan), Heavenly (South Korea) and Line TV (Taiwan).

A special episode will air on iQIYI in 2027.

== Synopsis ==
Sun (Thanakorn Wichanukhor) works as a debt collector for a loan shark named Sia Poh (Amnard Thangsomboon). One night, an enraged debtor stabs his younger brother to death. Just as Sun needs money to pay for his mother's cancer treatment, his boyfriend at the time, Bank (Thanawat Shinawatra), draws a large sum of money out from his account and vanishes. Sun finds himself deep in debt and ultimately loses his mother after the treatment fails. Since then, he has lived tormented by guilt, believing he is responsible for the deaths of his brother and mother.

Five years later, Sun no longer works as a debt collector and instead delivers packages. While making a delivery at Dream Entertainment, he encounters Bank, who is a rising actor who now goes by the stage name Sunny. Sun overhears that Bank was the one who had tipped off the debtor about his brother's whereabouts, leading to his death. From that moment, Sun decides to infiltrate the entertainment world to seek revenge.

Coincidentally, Sun had been scouted to join Dream Entertainment by Kajorn (Jirapat Uttamanan), Sunny's former manager. His plan for revenge also attracts the attention of Jay (Jarukit Kaewmoonrueang), the mysterious high-ranking director at the company that Sun encounters on the rooftop.

== Cast and characters ==
=== Main ===
- Thanakorn Wichanukhor (Minlee) as Theemekha Rungsapdee (Sun)
  - Taechin Kittiwattanakorn (Fiat) as Sun (young)
- Jarukit Kaewmoonrueang (Toptap) as Athip Wanitsakitphaisan (Jay)
  - Suppakit Wongsa (Shogun) as Jay (young)
- Paramee Thesdaroon (Shogun) as Phanuwat Manasakdech (Sky)
- Thanawat Shinawatra (Fuaiz) as Thanapat Loetkraisorn (Bank / Sunny)

=== Supporting ===
- Jirapat Uttamanan (Khunnote) as Kajorn Piyawanichkul
- Claude Athaseri (Moo) as Songphon
- Suttida Kasemsant Na Ayutthaya (Nook) as Pawinee Jirajaroensak
- Amnard Thangsomboon (Kie) as Sia Poh
- Kumron Jivachat as Kongkiat
- Gandhi Wasuwitchayagit as Sia Jo
- Yasaka Chaisorn (Pu) as Suchat
- Sarinya Inger Olsson (Lilly) as Director Karn
- Nawapol Sangsuwan (Eat) as Manager Game
- Maneenun Ningsanond (Poo) as Wandee (Sun's mother)
- Tanarit Photkanawat (Francis) as Kavin
- Paythai Ploymeeka (Phe) as Jay's father
- Peerapat Jarutasroj (Jam) as Wave
- Atagorn Sonyot (Tor) as Two-O
- Theeradon Wattanapan (Supreem) as Ten
- Pawarit Kinnares (Tawan) as Off
- Sasit Chatpiroonpun (Ramil) as Sky (Sun's younger brother)
- Nathita Chaipong as Angie (Kajorn's daughter)
- Pakin Pongsoipetch as Sky (young)

=== Guest ===
- Chaikamon Sermsongwittaya (Boss) as Pakin Wongsasat (Ep. 3, 6–7, 10)
- Kornthas Rujeerattanavorapan (Max) as Pen Nueng (Ep. 7–8)
- Napapat Sasiphanitchakun (Grace) as lead actress (Sky's stage play)
- Nitcha Jakchaikul (Mukki) as lead actress (Sky's stage play)
- Phetlada Pimchai (Hongpao) as lead actress (Karn's drama)

== Soundtrack ==
No.	Title	Writer(s)	Artist	Length
1.	"Until You (เธอทำให้รู้)"	Adison Wetchawong; Chear Nathaphon	Chear Nathaphon	3:18
2.	"Payback (ทวงคืน)"	Tan Pakdee	Sam Sermsartr	3:12

== Production ==
The original webtoon accumulated over 20.48 million views across platforms such as Boomtoon and Lezhin TH, being translated into more than 8 languages and distributed in countries including South Korea, Japan, Thailand and the United States.

The series was announced as an international co-production between Aplan International Group (Thailand), Rakuten TV (Japan), Kidari Studio (South Korea) and Copus Japan. The blessing ceremony and filming began in January 2026.

== Marketing ==
The series was promoted with a press conference and premiere screening event held at Major Cineplex Ratchayothin on 30 May 2026. The event featured a performance by the lead actors, as well as an exclusive behind-the-scenes Q&A session with the cast and crew.

== Accolades ==
Name of award ceremony, year presented, award category, nominee of award, and result of nomination
Award	Year	Category	Nominee/work	Result	Ref.
The Viral Hits Thailand Spotlight Awards	2026	Best BL Series Award	Payback	Won	
The Viral Hits Thailand Spotlight Awards	2026	Breakout On-Screen Couple Award	Thanakorn Wichanukhor and Jarukit Kaewmoonrueang	Won	
