= Two Worlds (TV series) =

2024 Thai fantasy BL television series

- Thai: โลกสองใบ ใจดวงเดียว
- Genre: Boys' love; Fantasy; Romantic drama
- Based on: Two Worlds โลกสองใบใจดวงเดียว by Prang
- Written by: Pratchaya Thavornthummarut
- Directed by: Petch Varayu Rukskul; Khets Thunthup
- Starring: Kornthas Rujeerattanavorapan; Natasit Uareksit; Thapanawat Kaewbumrung
- Country of origin: Thailand
- Original language: Thai
- No. of episodes: 10

Production
- Executive producer: James Punnaphat Danaiarunphat
- Running time: 48 minutes
- Production company: Kongthup Production

Original release
- Network: iQIYI
- Release: 21 March – 16 May 2024

Two Worlds (Thai: โลกสองใบ ใจดวงเดียว; RTGS: Lok Song Bai Chai Duang Diao, lit. 'Two Worlds One Heart') is a Thai fantasy boys' love series produced by Kongthup Production, starring Kornthas Rujeerattanavorapan (Max), Natasitt Uareksit (Nat) and Thapanawat Kaewbumrung (Gun).

The series ran from 21 March to 16 May 2024, with new episodes every Thursday on iQIYI. It became available on Viki in 2025.

== Synopsis ==
Kram (Nat) loses the person he loves, Phupha (Gun), who gets murdered. Out of desperation, he goes to Moon Waterfall, a place that's supposed to reunite people with those they've lost. But he ends up falling into the water and gets transported to a parallel universe. This other world is almost the same as his, except for one thing: Phupha is still alive there.

Kram wants to fix the past and save Phupha in this new world. To do that, he asks for help from Tai (Max), a quiet and mysterious guy. Tai agrees to help. But along the way, Kram starts feeling something different for him. And Tai seems to have feelings for Kram too.

== Cast ==
=== Main ===
- Kornthas Rujeerattanavorapan (Max) as Tai
- Natasitt Uareksit (Nat) as Kram
- Thapanawat Kaewbumrung (Gun) as Phupha

=== Supporting ===
- Varayu Phusomjitsakul (Pak) as Jao
- Taechin Phaisanwan (Mon) as Wayu
- Frayya Waranit Nitanitiphat as Run (Phupha's fiancée)
- Kevin Noravee Chancharoenkul as Ohm
- Ufa Nattawat Tunkaew as Prem
- Nam Rapeepat Eakpankul as Por (Tai's father)
- Kate Thiyada Phanbua as Satreekit (Phupha's aunt)
- Yokyek Chernyim as Piak
- Plaifah Penpat Kairapee as Dueandao
- Pik Supawit Vichitrananda as Chat
- Ya Janya Thanasawangkul as Lu (Tai's aunt)
- Tar Phasin Sritham as Dilok (Kram's father)
- Aom Pratamaporn Rattanapakdee as Phinfang (Kram's mother)

== Production ==
The series is based on the novel Two Worlds โลกสองใบใจดวงเดียว by Prang, which is over a thousand pages long. Production was handled by Kongthup Production, with Khets Thunthup and James Punnaphat Danaiarunphat as executive producers.

Filming started in 2023, after a blessing ceremony at the City Shrine in Bangkok. The official pilot already had over a million views before production even began.

Direction was shared between Petch Varayu Rukskul and Khets Thunthup.

== Awards and nominations ==
Year	Award	Category	Nominee	Result	Ref.
2024	Y Universe Awards	Best Original Novel/ Romance	Two Worlds	Won	
2024	Y Universe Awards	Best Novel Character	Kram (Nat Natasit)	Won	
2024	Y Universe Awards	Best Supporting Actor	Gun Thapanawat (Phupha)	Won	

== Release and marketing ==
The series premiered on iQIYI on 21 March 2024. During its run, the show's hashtag was often trending on Twitter/X in Brazil.

Because of its popularity, the cast came to Brazil in November 2024. They held a signing session on 23 November at Teatro Jardim Sul, and a fan meeting on 24 November at Terra SP. Five actors took part: Max, Nat, Gun, Pak Varayu and Mon Taechin.

In 2025, the series also became available on Viki, expanding its international reach.
