= Kornthas Rujeerattanavorapan =

Thai actor, model and host (born 1993)

- กรธัสส์ รุจีรัตนาวรพันธ์
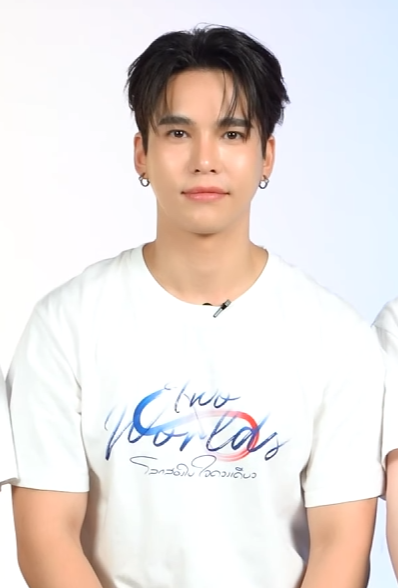
- Kornthas in 2024
- Born: 25 October 1993 (age 33); Thailand
- Other names: Max; Saran Rujeerattanavorapan (former name)
- Education: King Mongkut's University of Technology Thonburi
- Occupations: Actor; television host
- Years active: 2017–present
- Agent: Domundi TV
- Height: 182 cm (6 ft 0 in)

Kornthas Rujeerattanavorapan (Thai: กรธัสส์ รุจีรัตนาวรพันธ์; born 25 October 1993), formerly Saran Rujeerattanavorapan (Thai: ศรัณย์ รุจีรัตนาวรพันธ์), nicknamed Max (Thai: แม้ก), is a Thai actor and host. He is known for his roles in the television series Why R U? (2020), Y-Destiny (2021), Cutie Pie (2022), Naughty Babe (2023), and Two Worlds (2024).

== Early life and education ==
Kornthas was born in Thailand. He studied civil engineering at King Mongkut's University of Technology Thonburi. Max was originally named Saran but changed his first name to Kornthas in early 2022 after consulting a Buddhist monk.

== Career ==
In 2017, he made his acting debut as a guest in the television series Diamond Eyes. In 2020, he played Dew, a supporting role in the series Why R U?, alongside Natasit Uareksit (Nat). In 2021, he had his first leading role in the series Y-Destiny.

In 2022, he played Phayak Chatdecha Chen (Yi) in the series Cutie Pie. In 2023, he reprised the role in Naughty Babe and later made a guest appearance in the Korean remake of Why R U?. In 2024, he starred as Thai in the series Two Worlds.

== Filmography ==
=== Television series ===
Year	Title	Role	Network	Notes	Ref.
2017	Diamond Eyes	Max	Mono 29	Guest role	
2020	Why R U?	Dew	Line TV, One 31	Supporting role	
2020	You Never Eat Alone	Sun	AIS Play	Guest role	
2021	Y-Destiny	Sun	AIS Play	Main role	
2021	Close Friend	Titan	Viu	Main role	
2022	Cutie Pie	"Yi" Phayak Chatdecha Chen	Workpoint TV	Supporting role	
2022	War of Y		AIS Play	Guest role	
2023	Boyband	Merchant	GMM 25	Supporting role	
2023	Love Me Again	Jimmy	Viu	Main role	
2023	Naughty Babe	"Yi" Phayak Chatdecha Chen	iQIYI, One31	Main role	
2024	Two Worlds	Thai	iQIYI	Main role	
2025	Zomvivor	Thorn	Netflix	Main role	
2025	Suntiny	Sun	iQIYI	Main role	
2026	Duang with You	X	One 31, iQIYI	Guest role (Ep. 3–6, 12)	
2026	ChermChey	Lalit	TrueVisions Now	Supporting role	
2026	Payback	Pen Nueng	One 31	Guest role	
2026	Your Third	"Sarm" Traiphop Adisuan	GMM 25	Main role	
2026	The D Dorm	Dax	One 31	Main role	
TBA	Restart				

=== Web series ===
Year	Title	Role	Notes	Ref.
2023	Why R U?	Himself	Guest role (Ep. 1)	
2023	Y Journey: Stay Like a Local	Nueng	Main role	
2023	Marry's Mission	Pakorn	Supporting role	

== Awards and nominations ==
Award nominations for Kornthas Rujeerattanavorapan
Year	Award	Category	Nominee(s)	Result	Ref.
2024	Y Entertain Awards	Y Couple of the Year	MaxNat (Max and Nat)	Nominated	
