= Me and Who =

2025 Thai television series

- โปตัวปลอม
- Genre: Romantic comedy; Fantasy; Boys' love
- Written by: Natcha Kongmhun; Phattharawadee Sriwichai; Oxide Rungkun Soonthornleka
- Directed by: Jirawat Tosuwan
- Starring: Thanakorn Kuljarassombat; Anantadej Sodsee
- Country of origin: Thailand
- Original language: Thai
- No. of seasons: 1
- No. of episodes: 10

Production
- Executive producer: Kittipat Champa
- Producer: Siraya Saicheua
- Running time: 52 minutes
- Production companies: Mandee Work; Domundi TV

Original release
- Network: WeTV
- Release: 17 October – 5 December 2025

Me and Who (Thai: โปตัวปลอม, RTGS: Po Tua Plom) is a Thai romantic comedy-fantasy boys' love television series released in 2025. Directed by Jirawat Tosuwan (Osann) and produced by Mandee Work in collaboration with Domundi TV, the series aired on WeTV from 17 October to 5 December 2025.

== Synopsis ==
Phopthorn (Anantadej Sodsee), a young man from a poor background, dies and awakens in the body of Apo Yue, heir to a wealthy family and fiancé of Suriya (Thanakorn Kuljarassombat). Their arranged marriage begins as a deception, since Suriya has the ability to read minds and quickly realizes the truth. As they navigate family secrets and unexpected revelations, the façade gradually evolves into a genuine relationship built on trust and love.

== Cast ==
=== Main ===
- Thanakorn Kuljarassombat (Big) as Suriya / Suriyadechakorn
- Anantadej Sodsee (Park) as Apo Yue / Phopthorn

=== Supporting ===
- Chotipat Surasawat (Jeng) as Tailah
- Bhumintr Saingam (Pan) as Janjak
- Sittichok Pueakpoolpol (Tommy) as Ashin
- Ratchapong Anomakiti (Poppy) as Francois (butler)
- Wichai Saefant (Seng) as Yi
- Montree Jenuksorn (Pu) as Jakkawarn
- Pijika Jittaputta (Lookwa) as Pripprao
- Surasak Chaiat as Meng
- Thanaporn Wagprayoon (Parn) as Mei Fan
- Tanapon Hathaidachadusadee (Kade) as Torphong

=== Guest ===
- Harit Buayoi (Keng) as Korn (Ep. 1, 4–5)
- Napatsakorn Pingmuang (Namping) as Karn (Ep. 1, 4–5)
- Peerada Namwong (Paper) as Ari (Ep. 2)
- Peeranat Veeranipitkul (Peanut) (Ep. 8)
- Waratthip Kittisiripaisan (Euro) (Ep. 8)
- Preya Wongrabeb as Michelle (Ep. 9)
