= Thanakrit Chiamchunya =

Thai actor (born 2001)

- ธนกฤต เจียมจรรยา
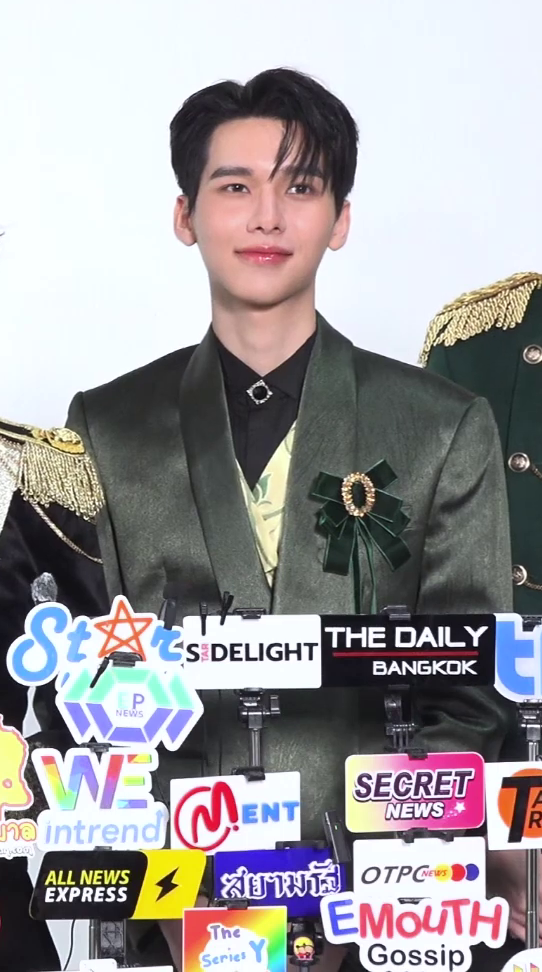
- Thanakrit in July 2024
- Born: 9 April 2001 (age 25); Thailand
- Other names: Ohm, Ohmkrit
- Occupation: Actor
- Years active: 2023–present
- Agent: Domundi TV
- Known for: Night in Night Dream; Paytai in The Next Prince
- Height: 184 cm (6 ft 0 in)

Thanakrit Chiamchunya (Thai: ธนกฤต เจียมจรรยา; born 9 April 2001), nicknamed Ohm (Thai: โอม), is a Thai actor. He is best known for his roles in Dinosaur Love (2023), Night Dream (2023), The Next Prince (2025) and Your Third (2026).

== Career ==
Thanakrit began his acting career in 2023 with a guest appearance in Dinosaur Love. In the same year, he joined Rookie Thailand and starred in his first BL series, Night Dream, alongside Krittawat Suwanich (Toosafe). In 2024, he joined Domundi TV. In 2025, he joined the main cast of The Next Prince, alongside Karn Kritsanaphan (Jimmy). In 2026, he appeared in ChermChey and Your Third, and is set to star in Magic Lover on iQIYI.

== Filmography ==
=== Television series ===
Year	Title	Role	Network	Notes	Ref.
2023	Dinosaur Love	Ohm	iQIYI	Guest role	
2023	Night Dream	Night	Youku	Main role	
2025	The Next Prince	Paytai Ronawi	One 31, iQIYI	Supporting role	
2026	ChermChey	Chen Nai	GagaOOLala, TrueVisions	Guest role (Ep. 4, 6, 10)	
2026	Your Third	Song	GMM25, iQIYI	Supporting role	
2026	The D Dorm	Dom	One 31	Guest role (Ep. 8)	
TBA	Magic Lover	Deris Fatherant	iQIYI	Main role	
TBA	Uke	TBA			
TBA	Zomvivor Chapter 2	TBA			
TBA	Into Racha	Tang-oh			
TBA	Buddy Line Y Animal	Ohm	Channel 3	Supporting role	

=== Film ===
Year	Title	Role	Notes
2023	Dinosaur Love: The Movie	Ohm	Guest role
