= Maya Awards (Thailand) =

Thai awards show presented by Maya Channel Magazine

- Current: 2024 Maya Awards
- Awarded for: Excellence in film, television and music
- Country: Thailand
- Presented by: Maya Channel Magazine
- First award: 2015; 11 years ago
- Website: Official website

The Maya Awards (Thai: มายา มหาชน; RTGS: Maya Mahachon) is an annual Thai entertainment awards ceremony presented by Maya Channel Magazine. The awards honor people in the Thai entertainment industry and their achievements in the music, film, television and drama. A selected panel of filmmakers and major film critics, which include directors, actors, and actresses take part in the nomination process and determination of winners. It also includes people's choice categories where nominees are voted upon by people through mobile phones and the magazine's voting coupon.

The first ceremony was held on 9 September 2015.
