= DFF =

DFF or D.F.F. may refer to:

- D.F.F., a 2002 extended play, a by extreme metal and stoner rock band Blood Duster
- Danish Council for Independent Research (Det Frie Forskningsråd), a Danish governmental body
- Deutscher Fernsehfunk, the state television broadcaster in the German Democratic Republic
- Diflufenican, a herbicide active ingredient
- Digital Forensics Framework, computer forensics open-source software
- Digital Freedom Foundation, a non-profit organisation that acts as the official organiser of Software, Hardware, and other Freedom Days
- Directorate of Film Festivals, an Indian government organisation that organises the International Film Festival of India and other ceremonies
- Disposable Film Festival, an annual juried international festival of short films
- D flip-flop (or data flip-flop), an electronic primitive component useful for implementing computer memory
- Dead Friend Forever – DFF, Thai television series
