= Man Suang =

2023 Thai historical mystery-drama film

- Theatrical release poster
- Thai: แมนสรวง
- Directed by: Bhanbhassa Dhubtien; Chartchai Ketnust; Krisda Witthayakhajorndet
- Screenplay by: Krisda Witthayakhajorndet; Bhanbhassa Dhubtien; Parida Manomaiphibul; Panuwat Denice Inthawat
- Starring: Nattawin Wattanagitiphat; Phakphum Romsaithong
- Cinematography: Chaiyapruek Chalermpornpanich
- Production company: Be On Cloud
- Distributed by: M Pictures
- Release date: August 24, 2023
- Running time: 128 minutes
- Country: Thailand
- Language: Thai

Man Suang (Thai: แมนสรวง) is a 2023 Thai historical mystery-drama film starring Apo Nattawin Wattanagitiphat and Mile Phakphum Romsaithong. It centers on the character of Khem, a commoner during the reign of King Rama III of the Rattanakosin period, who gets embroiled in the sociopolitical conflicts of a secret entertainment center, the titular Man Suang. Along his journey, he is accompanied by Wan, his best friend, and makes the acquaintance of Chatra, a nobleman with a hidden motive who works at Man Suang.

== Plot ==
Khem and Wan, two young men from the city of Paet Riw, are tasked with investigating clues in Man Suang, the most majestic and mysterious entertainment venue in Bangkok. Behind the curtain of happiness, this place where international people gather was the site of political planning and settlement at the end of the reign of King Rama III of the Rattanakosin period. Two friends joined the troupe and met Chat, the band's hand. Their relationship develops as Man Suang's dark secrets and the knots in their hearts gradually come out.

== Cast ==
- Apo Nattawin Wattanagitiphat as Khem, a commoner from rural Thailand who joins Man Suang as a khon dancer with a secret mission and hopes to better his station in life and society.
- Mile Phakphum Romsaithong as Chatra, a taphon player with a secret identity who has motives of his own. He joins forces with Khem and Wan to help them on their mission.
- Bas Asavapatr Ponpiboon as Wan, Khem's best friend. He helps Khem on his mission in Man Suang.
- Tong Thanayut Thakoonauttaya as Hong, the son of Man Suang's owner and a businessman, a man with dubious motives.
- Nat Chartchai Ketnust as Chao Sua Cheng, the owner of Man Suang. He's an overseas Chinese man, ambitious and farsighted, and has a compassionate nature towards his friends.
- Gandhi Wasuwitchayagit as Phraya Wichiendej, a new generation Royal Navy aristocrat.
- Tua Pradit Prasartthong as Phraya Bodisorn, a nobleman from the Thai Royal Court, is influential and powerful.
- Chua Sornchai Chatwiriyachai as Khun Sutin Borirak, a civil servant of mixed Chinese heritage
- Saifah Tanthana as Tiang, the right hand man of Chao Sua Cheng, adopted by him when Tiang's father died.
- Orn Ornanong Panyawong as Mae Kru Phikun, the trainer for all traditional dancers at Man Suang, she was a former dancer in the Royal Court during the previous king's reign.
- Lookpear Nonthakorn Chalermnai as Mae Tubtim, the Madam of male and female prostitutes of Man Suang.

== Production ==
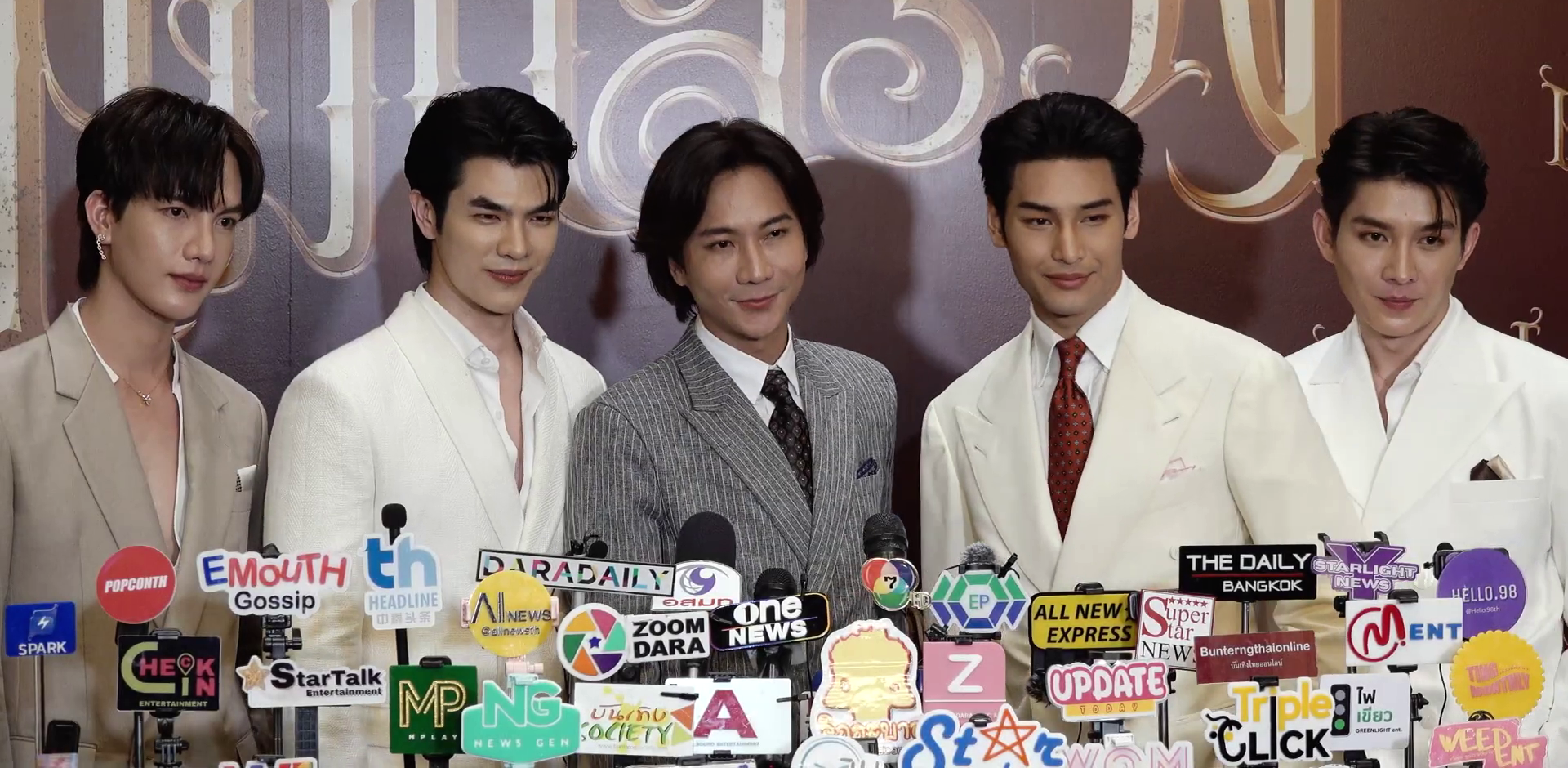
Man Suang main cast and director at a press conference, August 2023.

The film was conceptualized by the team at Be On Cloud in May–June 2022 following the success of KinnPorsche The Series. A pilot trailer was released by Be On Cloud at the KinnPorsche world tour Bangkok concert in July 2022. The production underwent changes, and the finalized script was ready by January 2023. Filming commenced in February 2023 and concluded by May 2023.

Be On Cloud teamed up with several historians and Thai cultural experts from Chulalongkorn University to understand and interpret the sociopolitical climate of that era. An elaborate set for the interiors of Man Suang was constructed, and filming took place both on set and in different historical locations, like the Ayuttaya Historical Park and Wat Thammaram temple. The team also approached the Thai Ministry of Culture, which approved part of the budget for the promotion and distribution of the film locally and worldwide.

Wattanagitiphat had to practice Thai traditional dance for more than seven months, lose weight and develop lean muscles to get into the role, while Romsaithong had to learn to play taphon.

The art director for the movie was Nakrob Moonmanas, a renowned name in the field, and his unique poster designs generated a lot of fanfare from the public. A special teaser and poster were released at the Cannes Film Festival in May 2023.

Post-production was done by White Light and the official trailer was released on June 24, 2023.

== Music ==
The OST for the film, "Hidden" (เร้น) by Thai band Cocktail, was released on August 8, 2024. The band collaborated with 28 Production to produce the background scores for the film.

== Release ==
Man Suang had its theatrical release on August 24, 2023, across Thailand. Be On Cloud confirmed subsequent releases in Laos, Vietnam, Cambodia, and several other countries. The film was released on Netflix on February 29, 2024.

== Reception ==
The film received mostly positive reviews. Man Suang set the record for the highest grossing advance ticket sales in the Thai movie industry in the two prior decades – 11 million baht – and the highest grossing Thai film of 2023.

Somkiat Soithong of Spacebar Th called it "the dark horse movie of 2023", noting that it was a "novelty for period movies in Thailand. In addition, creating a complete set of elements helps to deliver beautiful, realistic images. as well as presenting foreign cultures that had influences in that era to present as well. [...] It can be said that this is one of the best Thai movies in 2023, so it would not be exaggerated."

Pita Limcharoenrat praised the artistic merit of the film, saying, "culture is meant to be released. They are not meant to be oppressed."

== Accolades ==
Award	Year	Category	Nominee/work	Result	Ref.
Bangkok Pride Awards	2025	Pride Popular of Movie	Man Suang	Nominated	
Bangkok Critics Assembly Awards	2024	Best Song for a Motion Picture	"Hidden"	Nominated	
Bangkok Critics Assembly Awards	2024	Best Music Score	Terdsak Janpan	Nominated	
Bangkok Critics Assembly Awards	2024	Best Construction Design	Chatchai Chaiyon, Nakrob Moonmanas	Nominated	
Japan Expo Thailand Awards	2024	Best Actor Award	Nattawin Wattanagitiphat	Won	
Japan Expo Thailand Awards	2024	Best Actor Award	Phakphum Romsaithong	Won	
Line Stickers Awards	2023	Best Group Stickers	Man Suang	Won	
Maya TV Awards	2024	Best Film in Thai Arts and Culture Award	Man Suang	Won	
Maya TV Awards	2024	Best Leading Actor in a Movie Award	Nattawin Wattanagitiphat	Won	
Maya TV Awards	2024	Charming Male of the Year Award	Nattawin Wattanagitiphat	Nominated	
Maya TV Awards	2024	Charming Male of the Year Award	Phakphum Romsaithong	Nominated	
Nine Entertain Awards	2024	Movie of the Year	Man Suang	Nominated	
Nine Entertain Awards	2024	Creative Team of the Year	Man Suang	Nominated	
Sanook Top of the Year Awards	2023	Best Movie of the Year	Man Suang	Nominated	
Sanook Top of the Year Awards	2023	Most Popular Male Actor of the Year	Nattawin Wattanagitiphat	Won	
Suphannahong National Film Awards	2024	Best Costume Design	Kijja Lapho, Nakrob Moonmanas	Won	
Suphannahong National Film Awards	2024	Best Art Direction	Nakrob Moonmanas, Supasit Phutakam	Won	
Suphannahong National Film Awards	2024	Best Make Up Effects	Phakanat Poolsawat, Tham Art Studio	Nominated	
Suphannahong National Film Awards	2024	Best Cinematography	Chaiyapreuk Chalermpornpanich	Nominated	
Suphannahong National Film Awards	2024	Most Popular Thai Film	Man Suang	Nominated	
Thai Film Director Awards	2024	Best Cast	Man Suang	Nominated	
Thai Film Director Awards	2024	Best Cinematography	Chaiyapreuk Chalermpornpanich	Nominated	
Thailand Box Office Movie Awards	2023	Actor of the Year	Nattawin Wattanagitiphat	Nominated	
Thailand Box Office Movie Awards	2023	Actor of the Year	Phakphum Romsaithong	Nominated	
Thailand Box Office Movie Awards	2023	Thai Film of the Year	Man Suang	Won	
Thailand Box Office Movie Awards	2023	Thai Film Technical Award of the Year	Man Suang	Won	
Thailand Box Office Movie Awards	2023	Thai Screenplay of the Year	Man Suang	Won	
Thailand Box Office Movie Awards	2023	Thai Film Director of the Year	Bhanbhassa Dhubtien, Chartchai Ketnust, Krisda Witthayakhajorndet	Won	
Thailand Social Awards	2024	Best Content Performance on Social Media – Thai Movie	Man Suang	Nominated	
