= 4 Minutes (disambiguation) =

"4 Minutes" is a 2008 song by Madonna featuring Justin Timberlake and Timbaland.

4 Minutes or Four Minutes may also refer to:

- "4 Minutes", a song by Avant from Director, 2006
- 4Minute, a South Korean girl group
- 4Minutes (TV series), a 2024 Thai TV series
- Four Minutes, a 2006 German drama film
- "Four Minutes", a song by Roger Waters from Radio K.A.O.S., 1987

== See also ==
- Four-minute mile, the running of a mile (1,609.344 metres, 1,760 yards) in four minutes or less
- Four-minute warning, a public alert system conceived by the British Government during the Cold War
