= Patiphan Fueangfunuwat =

Thai actor

- เจที ปฏิภาณ เฟื่องฟูนุวัฒน์
- Patiphan in August 2026
- Born: 29 August 2000 (age 26); Thailand
- Occupation: Actor
- Years active: 2023–present
- Agent(s): Be On Cloud (2023–2026); Domundi TV (2026–present)

Patiphan Fueangfunuwat (Thai: เจที ปฏิภาณ เฟื่องฟูนุวัฒน์; born 29 August 2000), known as JT and formerly known by the nicknames JJ and JJay, is a Thai actor. He is known for his roles as Tee in Dead Friend Forever – DFF (2023), Win in 4Minutes (2024), and Sucha in Shine (2025). In 2026, he stars in the series Magic Lover, produced by Domundi TV and iQIYI.

== Biography and career ==
In 2024, Patiphan graduated from Bangkok University. He made his acting debut in 2023, starring in Dead Friend Forever – DFF. In 2026, he was announced as one of the lead actors of Magic Lover.

== Filmography ==
=== Television series ===
Year	Title	Role	Network	Notes	Ref.
2023	Dead Friend Forever – DFF	Tee (Pariphat Wanit)	One 31, iQIYI	Main role	
2024	4Minutes	Win (Inspector)	One 31, Viu	Main role	
2025	Shine	Sucha	iQIYI	Supporting role	
2026	Your Third	Payu	GMM 25	Guest role (Ep. 12)	
TBA	Magic Lover	TBA		Main role	
