= Chalach Tantijibul =

Thai actor (born 1994)

- เจเจ ชลัช ตันติจิบูรณ์
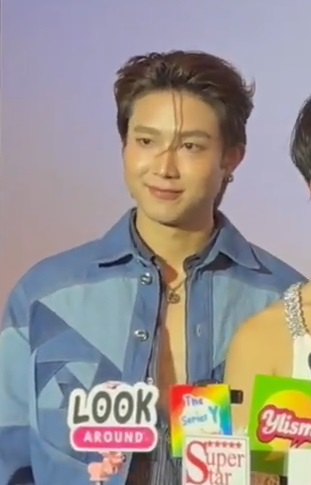
- Chalach in 2025
- Born: June 28, 1994 (age 32); Thailand
- Other name: 2J
- Occupation: Actor
- Years active: 2022–present
- Agent(s): BeonCloud (2022–2023); Go 2 INFINITY (2024–present)
- Notable work: KinnPorsche (2022); Dead Friend Forever – DFF (2023); Near Clinic, Near My Heart (2025); Lover Merman (2025); Sokaphiwat (2025)

Chalach Tantijibul (Thai: เจเจ ชลัช ตันติจิบูรณ์, born June 28, 1994), professionally known as 2J, is a Thai actor. He is best known for his roles in KinnPorsche (2022), Dead Friend Forever – DFF (2023), Near Clinic, Near My Heart (2025), Lover Merman (2025), and the film Sokaphiwat (2025).

== Career ==
In 2022, Chalach signed with BeonCloud and joined the cast of the BL series KinnPorsche, broadcast on One 31. The following year, he appeared in Dead Friend Forever – DFF, also produced by BeonCloud and streamed on iQIYI and One 31.

In December 2024, he signed with Go 2 INFINITY and was cast as the lead in the BL series Near Clinic, Near My Heart (2025), alongside Jiramate Srinonghang (Dew). In 2025, he co-starred with Dew in Lover Merman, broadcast on Viki and Channel 7HD. That same year, he starred in the film Sokaphiwat, portraying Jessada Sokaphiwat, which premiered in Thai cinemas.

== Filmography ==
=== Television series ===
Year	Title	Role	Notes	Network / Streaming
2022	KinnPorsche	Time	Supporting cast	One31; iQIYI
2023	Dead Friend Forever – DFF	Keng	Supporting cast	One31; iQIYI
2025	Near Clinic, Near My Heart	Bright	Main cast	Go2Infinity, YouTube
2025	Lover Merman	Phana	Main cast	Channel 7HD; GagaOOLala, Viki

=== Films ===
Year	Title	Role	Notes
2025	Sokaphiwat	Jessada Sokaphiwat	Lead

=== Television programs ===
Year	Title	Notes
2022	Mafia Kindergarten	Main host (Eps. 1, 4)
2022	Super Match	Guest (Ep. 6)
2020	SosatSeoulsay	Guest (Ep. 105)
