= Phakphum Romsaithong =

Thai actor, model and singer (born 1992)

- ภาคภูมิ ร่มไทรทอง
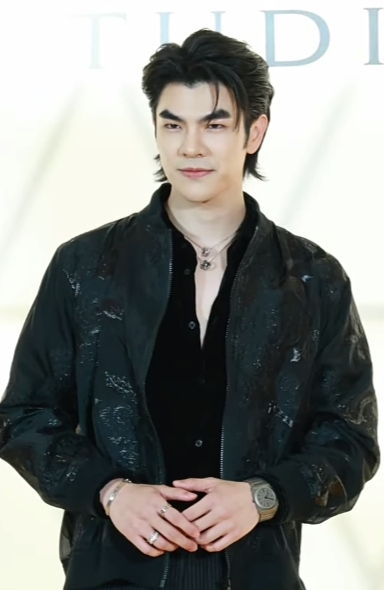
- Mile in March 2024
- Born: 5 January 1992 (age 34); Kalasin, Thailand
- Other name: Mile (มาย)
- Education: Thammasat University
- Occupations: Actor; singer
- Years active: 2016–present
- Notable work: KinnPorsche (2022)
- Height: 183 cm (6 ft 0 in)

Phakphum Romsaithong (Thai: ภาคภูมิ ร่มไทรทอง; born 5 January 1992), nicknamed Mile (Thai: มาย) is a Thai actor, singer. He is best known for his main roles in KinnPorsche (2022) and Man Suang (2023).

== Early life and education ==
Phakphum was born on January 5, 1992, in Kalasin, Thailand. The family is reported to own hotels and malls in Thailand. In 2017, he graduated from Thammasat University with a bachelor's degree in Journalism and Mass Communication.

== Career ==
Mile became known on the TU Sexy Boy stage, worked as a DJ for the PYNK 98 FM radio station, and has released music under the label Luster Entertainment. He appeared in a music video for Thai singer Jodai and tried out for the reality television singing competition The Star. In 2018, he played the role of Poon in the TV drama Turmeric Love with Plaster, which aired on Line TV. In 2020, he starred in the short film Ladytwenty.

Mile gained significant attention in the entertainment industry through his role in the 2021 Thai BL drama KinnPorsche, where he starred alongside Nattawin Wattanagitiphat. Despite his success in acting, Romsaithong didn't originally intend to pursue a career in this field. In an interview with Harper's Bazaar Singapore, he confessed that acting had never crossed his mind before. "I've always had a passion for business and strategic planning", he revealed to the publication. The series achieved global success, garnering a widespread fan base and sparking a five-city Asia tour to Singapore, Seoul, Manila, Ho Chi Minh City, and Taipei, all due to its popularity.

In February 2023, Phakphum attended the Dior Winter Fashion Show in Paris. In June 2023, Mile and Apo were designated as brand ambassadors for Dior.

He marked his big-screen debut with the 2023 Thai political-thriller film Man Suang, starring alongside his KinnPorsche co-star, Apo. The film received acclaim after making its debut at the 2023 Cannes International Film Festival. The film accumulated over THB 24.2 million within the first four days of its release in Thailand.

== Filmography ==
=== Film ===
Year	Title	Role	Notes
2020	Ladytwenty	Mile (EP.10)	Main role (Short film)
2023	Man Suang	Chatra	Main role

=== Television ===
Year	Title	Role	Notes	Channel
2018	Khamin Rak Kap Poon	Mad Sir Poon	Main role	LINE TV
2022	KinnPorsche	Kinn Anakinn Theerapanyakul	Main role	One 31, iQIYI
2025	Jetlag	"Chai" Katha Khuangphuangthong	Main role	One 31, CH7HD
2025	Shine	Tanwa Chatbodi	Main role	CH7HD, WeTV

=== Shows ===
Year	Title	Role	Channel	Ref.
2021	คุณพระช่วย		Workpoint TV	
2021	GACHA GACHA ท้าอร่อย 2	Guest	Amarin TV	
2022	Sound Check	Guest	One 31	

=== Music video appearances ===
Year	Song Title	Artist	Ref.
2018	พะวง (Phawng, 'Worry')	พริกไทย (Prik Thai)	
2019	ไม่รู้สึก (Mị̀rū̂ s̄ụk, 'I don't feel anything')	โอบ โอบขวัญ (Opkhwan)	
2020	เพื่อนเล่น (Pheụ̄̀xn lèn, 'Playmates')	Mine	
2020	เสก (Sek, 'Magical')	Jodai × พริกไทย (Prik Thai)	

== Discography ==
Year	Song title	Notes	Ref.
2016	ไม่อยากเห็นเธอเป็นแบบนี้ (Just enough)	Single	
2017	ในความฝัน(ในของขวัญ)(Dream)	Single	
2018	อย่าถามเวลากับนาฬิกาที่หยุดเดิน	Single	

== Concerts ==
Year	Events	Notes
2022	KinnPorsche World Tour	With KinnPorsche cast
2024	Authentic Mile First Solo Concert	8th June, at Bangkok, Thailand, UOB Live

== Awards and nominations ==
Name of award ceremony, year presented, award category, nominee of award, and result of nomination
Award	Year	Category	Nominee/work	Result	Ref.
GQ Thailand Men of the Year Awards	2022	Breakthrough Actors	with Nattawin Wattanagitiphat	Won	
Japan Expo Thailand Awards	2024	Best Actor Award	Phakphum Romsaithong	Won	
Maya TV Awards	2024	Charming Male of the Year Award	Phakphum Romsaithong	Nominated	
Nine Entertain Awards	2023	Public's Favorite	with Nattawin Wattanagitiphat	Nominated	
Sanook Top of the Year Awards	2025	Most Iconic Couple	with Nattawin Wattanagitiphat	Nominated	
SEC Awards	2026	Best Performance in an Asian Series	Phakphum Romsaithong	Nominated	
Thailand Box Office Awards	2023	Actor of the Year	Phakphum Romsaithong	Nominated	
Thailand Box Office Awards	2025	Couple of the Year (Series)	with Nattawin Wattanagitiphat	Nominated	
Thailand Y Content Awards	2025	Popular Vote	Phakphum Romsaithong	Nominated	
Weibo Gala	2025	Role Model Actor	Phakphum Romsaithong	Won	
Y Entertain Awards	2025	Leading Boys' Love Star of the Year	Phakphum Romsaithong	Won	
