= Nattawin Wattanagitiphat =

Thai actor (born 1994)

- ณัฐวิญญ์ วัฒนกิติพัฒน์
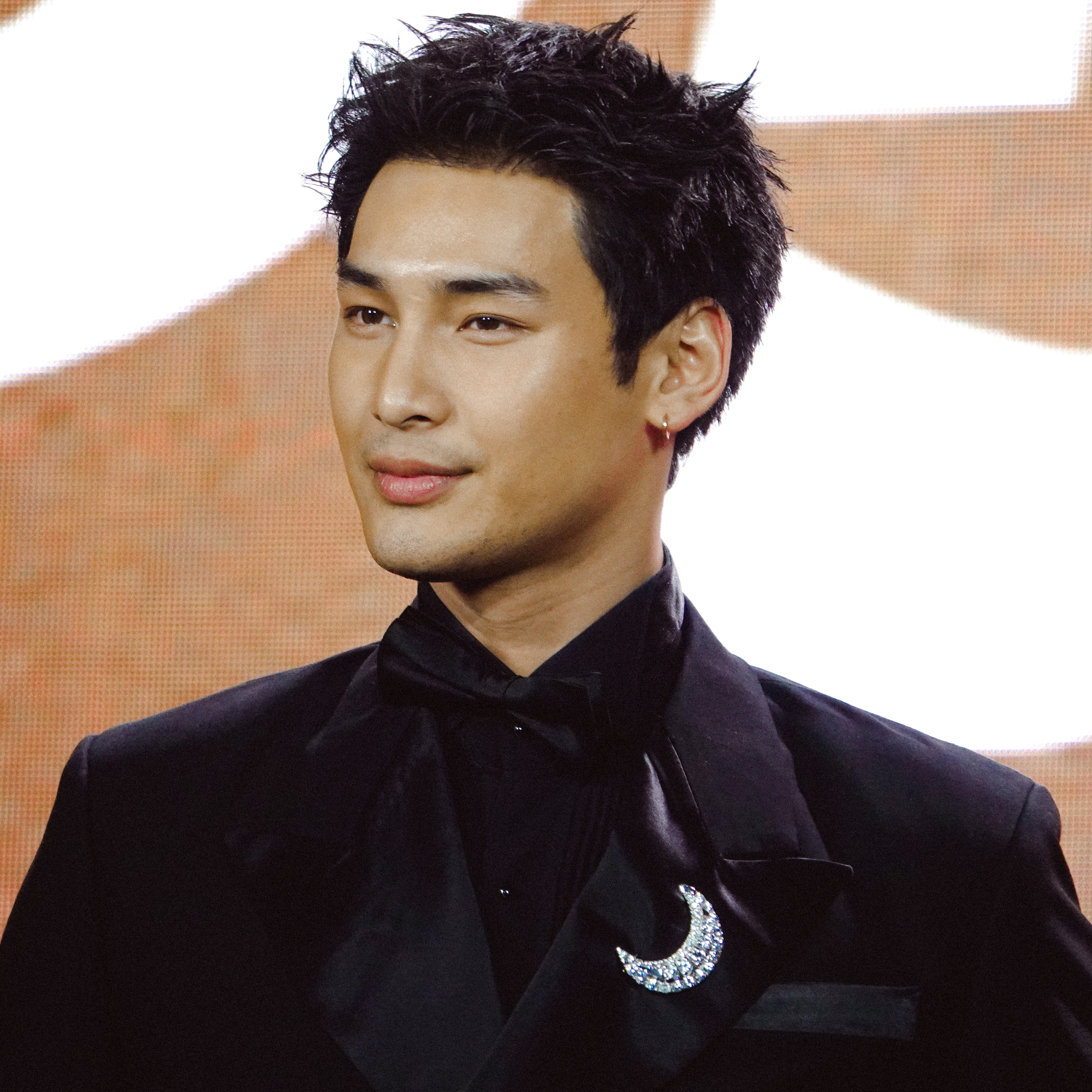
- Wattanagitiphat at a fansign event in Chongqing, China
- Born: 24 February 1994 (age 32); Hua Hin, Prachuap Khiri Khan, Thailand
- Other name: Apo (อาโป)
- Education: Rangsit University
- Occupation: Actor
- Years active: 2015–present
- Agents: Channel 3 (2014–2019); Be On Cloud (2022–present)
- Height: 181 cm (5 ft 11 1/2 in)

Nattawin Wattanagitiphat (Thai: ณัฐวิญญ์ วัฒนกิติพัฒน์; born 24 February 1994), nicknamed Apo (Thai: อาโป) is a Thai actor. He is best known for his main roles in Sud Kaen Saen Rak (2015), KinnPorsche (2022), Man Suang (2023), and Shine (2025).

== Early life and education ==
Nattawin Wattanagitiphat was born on February 24, 1994. He attended Thammasat University before transferring to Faculty of Communication Arts at Rangsit University.

== Career ==
In 2014, Wattanagitiphat signed a contract as an actor with Channel 3 and made his debut in Sud Kaen Saen Rak. Later in the same year, he starred in a Luead Mungkorn, a Thai lakorn series consisting of five dramas. In 2018, he starred in Chart Suer Pun Mungkorn; he then went on hiatus and moved to the United States until his contract with Channel 3 expired.

Upon his return in Thailand, in 2021 Wattanagitiphat was cast in the Thai boys' love (BL) series, KinnPorsche The Series, in the lead role of Porsche. The cut version of the series aired on One 31, and the uncut version (KinnPorsche The Series: La Forte) aired on iQIYI from April to June 2022. Wattanagitiphat rose to global prominence for his role, earning him luxury fashion collaborations.

On 24 August 2023, the Thai historical movie Man Suang starring Wattanagitiphat in the lead role of Khem, a traditional Thai dancer, was released. The movie earned more than 11 million baht nationwide on the first day, breaking the record for the highest number of movie ticket reservations in 20 years of Thai movies. Wattanagitiphat's performance was also well received.

In September 2025, Wattanagitiphat appeared on the cover of Vogue Thailand September issue.

== Personal life ==
In 2019, he was ordained for one month at Wat Somphanas.

== Endorsements ==
In June 2023, Wattanagitiphat was named Dior Thailand House Ambassador together with Phakphum Romsaithong. In September 2023, he was named Friend of the Maison Southeast Asia for Swiss luxury watchmaker and jeweler Piaget. Shortly after his second collaboration with Piaget in April 2024, he was appointed as global ambassador. By early 2024, his earned media value from luxury fashion collaborations was tallied as $48.2 million by marketing agency Lefty.

With Wattanagitiphat's rising global influence, the Tourism Authority of Thailand started a tourism campaign with him and Butterbear as presenters in September 2024.

On 4 October 2024, in the inaugural collaboration of global fashion media, WWD and Siam Piwat Group, he was invited as a guest speaker as one of the key influencers for South East Asia's Power of Global Influence Panel.

On his birthday on 24 February 2025, he launched his first fashion collection with Skechers Thailand, for which he had become an ambassador in April 2024.

On 30 September 2025, Thailand Privilege Card Co., Ltd. (TPC), operator of the "Thailand Privilege" membership card program under the supervision of the Tourism Authority of Thailand (TAT), appointed Wattanagitiphat as its first global brand ambassador in 22 years.

In April 2026, Skechers renewed its partnership with Wattanagitiphat for the third consecutive year, elevating his position to Asia Pacific brand ambassador. The appointment marked a first for Skechers, with Wattanagitiphat becoming the first Skechers ambassador to move from a domestic role to a regional position.

On 22 October 2026, Wattangitiphat joined the prestigious luxury fragrance house, The House of Creed, as a Friend of the House for Southeast Asia, namely Thailand, the Philippines, and Malaysia.

== Filmography ==
=== Television ===
Year	Title	Role	Notes	Ref.
2015	Sud Kaen Saen Rak	Thana Thaweewattana	Main role	
2015	Luead Mungkorn: Krating	Tang Cheng Yang (Young)	Main role	
2015	Luead Mungkorn: Raed	Tang Cheng Yang (Young)	Main role	
2015	Luead Mungkorn: Hong	Tang Cheng Yang (Young)	Main role	
2016	Chaat Payak	A Wurn	Main role	
2016	Pra Teap Rak Hang Jai	Pong Khun Boon Jirakit	Main role	
2017	Buang Banjathorn	Sanpaeng	Support role	
2018	Kai Mook Mungkorn Fire	Inspector Danthai	Main role	
2018	Nak Soo Taywada	disguised Tay	Guest role	
2018	Prakasit Kammathep	Harin	Support role	
2018	Chart Suer Pun Mungkorn	Lim Heng Tiang / Ah-Tiang	Support role	
2022	KinnPorsche	Porsche Pachara Kittisawasd	Main role	
2025	Shine	Dr. Trin Suwannaphas	Main role	

=== Films ===
Year	Title	Role	Notes	Ref.
2023	Man Suang	Khem	Main role	
2025	Tee Yai: Born to Be Bad	Tee Yai	Main role	
2026	The Stain (ราคี)	Pran	Main role	

== Discography ==
Year	Song title	Notes	Ref.
2016	"ถักทอด้วยหัวใจ" (Acoustic Version)	Pra Teap Rak Hang Jai OST	

== Concerts ==
Year	Events	Notes
2017	Love is in the Air: Channel 3 Charity Concert	With Channel 3 artists
2022	KinnPorsche World Tour	With KinnPorsche casts

== Awards and nominations ==
Award	Year	Category	Nominee/work	Result	Ref.
BoF500 – Class of 2023	2023	Business of Fashion 500 – Class of 2023	Nattawin Wattanagitiphat	Won	
Feed x Khaosod Awards	2026	Boys' Love Actor of the Year	Nattawin Wattanagitiphat	Nominated	
GQ Thailand Men of the Year	2022	Breakthrough Actor	Nattawin Wattanagitiphat	Won	
GQ Thailand Men of the Year	2025	Thailand's Global Star	Nattawin Wattanagitiphat	Won	
Japan Expo Thailand Awards	2024	Best Actor Award	Nattawin Wattanagitiphat	Won	
Maya TV Awards	2024	Best Leading Actor in a Movie Award	Nattawin Wattanagitiphat	Won	
Maya TV Awards	2024	Charming Male of the Year Award	Nattawin Wattanagitiphat	Nominated	
Nine Entertain Awards	2023	Public's Favorite	Nattawin Wattanagitiphat	Nominated	
Nine Entertain Awards	2026	Actor of the Year	Nattawin Wattanagitiphat	Nominated	
Sanook Top of the Year Awards	2023	Most Popular Male Actor of the Year	Nattawin Wattanagitiphat	Won	
Sanook Top of the Year Awards	2025	Most Iconic Couple	with Phakphum Romsaithong	Nominated	
Thailand Box Office Movie Awards	2023	Actor of the Year	Nattawin Wattanagitiphat	Nominated	
Thailand Y Content Awards	2025	Best Leading Actor	Nattawin Wattanagitiphat	Nominated	
Thailand Y Content Awards	2025	Popular Vote	Nattawin Wattanagitiphat	Nominated	
Weibo Gala	2025	Weibo Thailand Most Outstanding Actor	Nattawin Wattanagitiphat	Won	
