= Sokaphiwat =

2025 Thai psychological horror film

- โศกาภิวัฒน์
- Directed by: Nattachai Jiraanont
- Screenplay by: Nattachai Jiraanont
- Produced by: Wirat Chansaeng
- Starring: Claudia Chakrabandhu; Kaownah Kittipat Kaewcharoen; Tuss Thotsawat; Boss Thanabat Ngamkamolchai; JJ Chalach Tantijibul; Plan Koosuwan; JJ Chayakorn Jutamat; AJ Chayapol Jutamat
- Cinematography: Sittipong Kongtong
- Edited by: Nitipon Mahumaung; Sirasith Sriwongphanawes
- Production companies: WealthThan Empire Co., Ltd.
- Distributed by: WealthThan Empire Co., Ltd.
- Release date: 21 August 2025 (Thailand)
- Running time: 97 minutes
- Country: Thailand
- Language: Thai

Sokaphiwat (Thai: โศกาภิวัฒน์) is a 2025 Thai psychological horror and dark fantasy film directed and written by Nattachai Jiraanont. Produced by WealthThan Empire, the film was released in Thai cinemas on 21 August 2025 with a runtime of 97 minutes.

== Plot ==
Eight orphans are raised in a luxurious mansion hidden deep within the forest, under the strict control of a woman who calls herself "Mother." Bound by harsh rules and subjected to cruel punishments, their lives become a cycle of fear and obedience. When they finally succeed in rebelling against her, they believe freedom has arrived. However, the death of "Mother" unleashes a sinister force, revealing that their nightmare has only just begun.

== Cast ==
=== Main ===
- Claudia Chakrabandhu as Khunying Sokaphiwat
- Kaownah Kittipat Kaewcharoen as Nirut Sokaphiwat
- Tuss Thotsawat as Ritdet Sokaphiwat
- Boss Thanabat Ngamkamolchai as Kroekkiat Sokaphiwat
- Chalach Tantijibul (2J) as Jessada Sokaphiwat
- Plan Koosuwan as Wayusak Sokaphiwat
- JJ Chayakorn Jutamat as Naresuan Sokaphiwat
- AJ Chayapol Jutamat as Neramit Sokaphiwat

=== Supporting ===
- Duangjai Hiransri
- Sulax Siriphattharapong as Thiwa Sokaphiwat

== Production ==
The film was developed by WealthThan Empire. with Nattachai Jiraanont serving as both director and screenwriter. Cinematography was handled by Sittipong Kongtong, while editing was completed by Nitipon Mahumaung and Sirasith Sriwongphanawes.

== Release ==
Sokaphiwat premiered in Thai cinemas on 21 August 2025. The film was distributed by WealthThan Empire Co., Ltd. and carries a 15+ rating.

== Reception ==
The film attracted significant attention in Thai media for its dark psychological themes. TrueID highlighted the disturbing nature of the narrative, while Matichon emphasized the film's dark fantasy atmosphere and striking visuals.

Naewna and Thairath also reported on the release, describing Sokaphiwat as one of the most anticipated Thai horror films of 2025.
