= 4Minutes (TV series) =

2024 Thai television series

- Official series poster
- Thai: สี่นาที
- Genre: Boys' love; Romance; Sci-fi
- Directed by: Bhanbhassa Dhubthien; Kongkiat Komesiri
- Country of origin: Thailand
- Original language: Thai
- No. of episodes: 8

Production
- Running time: 45 minutes
- Production company: Be On Cloud

Original release
- Network: One 31; Viu
- Release: July 26 – September 13, 2024

4Minutes (Thai: สี่นาที; stylized in all caps) is a 2024 Thai boys' love television series starring Wichapas Sumettikul (Bible) and Jespipat Tilapornputt (Jes). Produced by Be On Cloud, the production company behind KinnPorsche, the show was released every Friday on Channel One 31 and Viu from July 26 to September 13, 2024.

== Synopsis ==
The story follows Great, a university student and the son of a wealthy business owner, who suddenly gains the mysterious power to foresee the future in 4 minutes. Great is unable to control this power and is on the search for the reason behind his newly gain power.

== Cast and characters ==
- Wichapas Sumettikul (Bible) as Great Pacharawit, a university student from the Business Administrative Faculty who has the supernatural power to foresee the future in 4 minutes.
- Jespipat Tilapornputt (Jes) as Tyme Thamin, a resident doctor of a surgery department
- Asavapatr Ponpiboon (Bas) as Korn
- Jetsadakorn Bundit (Jet) as Title
- Patiphan Fueangfunuwat (JJay) as Win
- Athens Werapatanakul (Mio) as Dome
- Yosatorn Konglikit (Job) as Den
- Thanawat Shinawatra (Fuaiz) as Tonkla
- Nantanat Thakadkul (Natty) as Fasai

== Production ==
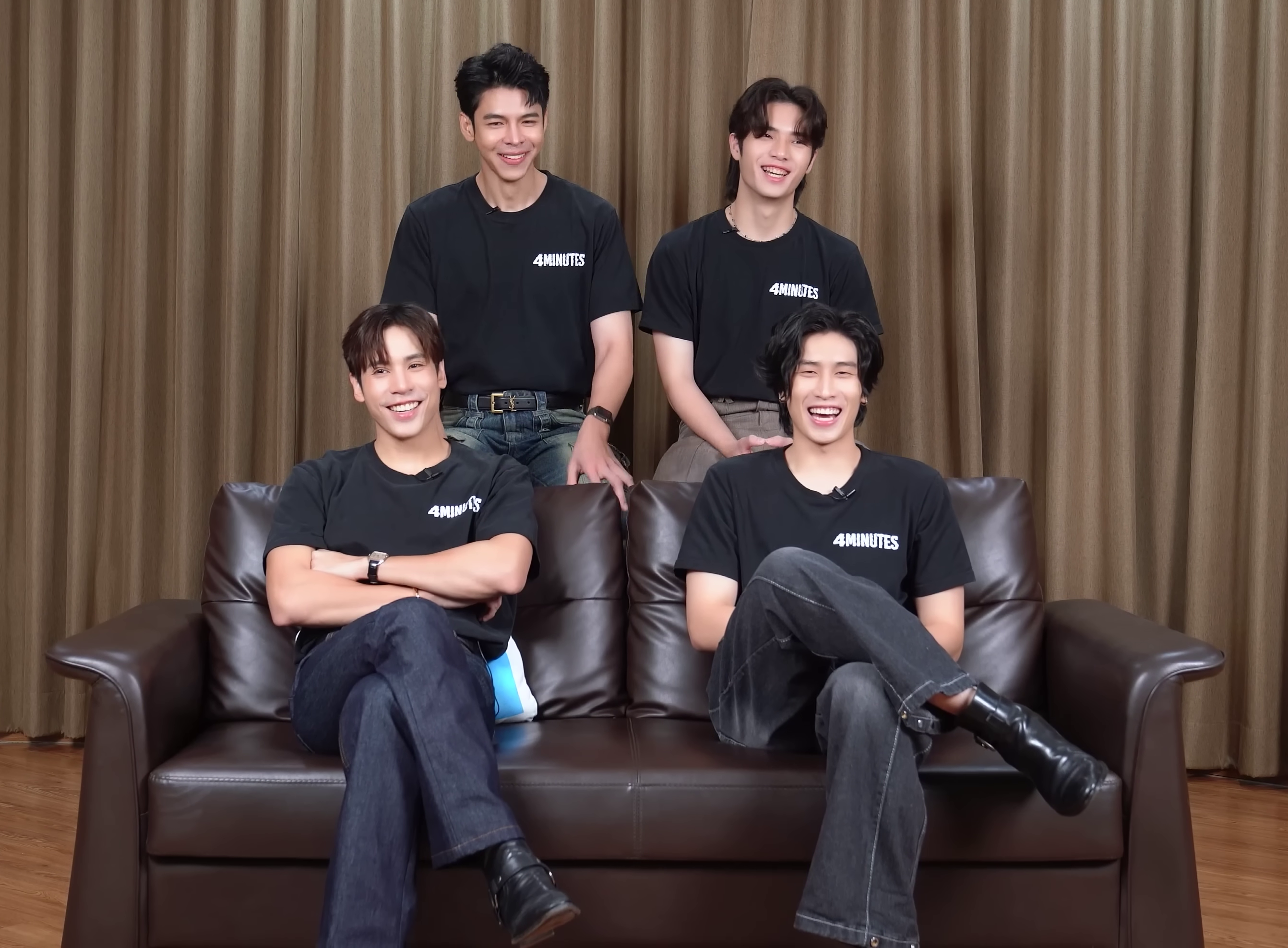
The main cast of 4Minutes

The series was announced in January 2023 as part of the Be On Cloud 2023 line-up. Jakapan Puttha (Build) had initially been cast as Tyme, but left the project following allegations of having assaulted his ex-girlfriend, Patchayamon Theewasujaroen. Jespipat Tilapornputt (Jes) was announced as his replacement in March 2024.

== Awards and nominations ==
Name of the award ceremony, year presented, category, nominee of the award, and the result of the nomination
Award	Year	Category	Nominee/work	Result	Ref.
Asian Academy Creative Awards	2025	Best Editing (National)	4Minutes	Won	
Feed x Khaosod Awards	2025	Top-Tier BL Series of the Year	4Minutes	Won	
Feed x Khaosod Awards	2025	Boy's Love Series Director of the Year	Bhanbhassa Dhubthien	Nominated	
Feed x Khaosod Awards	2025	Boy's Love Actor of the Year	Jespipat Tilapornputt	Nominated	
Japan Expo Thailand	2025	Popular Star Award	Wichapas Sumettikul	Won	
Japan Expo Thailand	2025	Popular Star Award	Jespipat Tilapornputt	Won	
Kazz Awards	2025	The Best Actor of the Year	Jespipat Tilapornputt	Nominated	
Maya TV Awards	2025	Male Couple of the Year	Wichapas Sumettikul and Jespipat Tilapornputt	Pending	
MChoice & Mint Awards	2024	Breakthrough Cast of the Year	4Minutes	Won	
Thailand Box Office Series Awards	2024	Series of the Year (BL)	4Minutes	Nominated	
Thailand Box Office Series Awards	2024	Series Actor of the Year	Wichapas Sumettikul	Nominated	
Thailand Box Office Series Awards	2024	Series Actor of the Year	Jespipat Tilapornputt	Nominated	
Thailand Box Office Series Awards	2024	Series Director of the Year	Bhanbhassa Dhubthien	Nominated	
Thailand Box Office Series Awards	2024	Original Song Series of the Year	"Deep Cleaning" (ล้าง...) by Parn Thanaporn	Nominated	
Thailand Box Office Series Awards	2024	Best Couple of the Year	Wichapas Sumettikul and Jespipat Tilapornputt	Nominated	
Thailand Y Content Awards	2025	Best Leading Actor	Jespipat Tilapornputt	Won	
Thailand Y Content Awards	2025	Best Special Effects	4Minutes	Won	
Thailand Y Content Awards	2025	Best Cinematography	4Minutes	Won	
The Viral Hits Awards	2024	Most Popular BL Series of the Year	4Minutes	Nominated	
The Viral Hits Awards	2024	Best BL Series Couple of the Year	Wichapas Sumettikul and Jespipat Tilapornputt	Nominated	
YEntertain Awards	2024	Rising Star Couple of the Year	Wichapas Sumettikul and Jespipat Tilapornputt	Nominated	
YEntertain Awards	2024	Best BL Series of the Year	4Minutes	Nominated	
YEntertain Awards	2024	Best Scene of the Year	4Minutes	Nominated	
YEntertain Awards	2024	Best Production Team of the Year	4Minutes	Nominated	
YEntertain Awards	2024	Best Y Series Director of the Year	Bhanbhassa Dhubthien	Nominated	
YEntertain Awards	2024	Leading Boys' Love Star of the Year	Jespipat Tilapornputt	Nominated	
YUniverse Awards	2024	Best Production	4Minutes	Nominated	
YUniverse Awards	2024	Best Script	4Minutes	Nominated	
YUniverse Awards	2024	Best Series	4Minutes	Nominated	
YUniverse Awards	2024	Excellent TV Media Reflecting Society	4Minutes	Nominated	
YUniverse Awards	2024	Best Leading Actor	Jespipat Tilapornputt	Nominated	
YUniverse Awards	2024	Best Series Director	Bhanbhassa Dhubthien	Nominated	
