= Shine (TV series) =

2025 Thai television series

- Official poster
- ชาย
- Genre: Romantic drama; Boys' Love; Historical drama
- Based on: Original screenplay
- Written by: Parida Manomaiphibul; Panuwat Inthawat; Bhanbhassa Dhubthien
- Directed by: Khamkwan Duangmanee; Panuwat Inthawat; Krisda Witthayakhajorndet
- Starring: Nattawin Wattanagitiphat; Phakphum Romsaithong; Yuke Songpaisan; Sinjai Plengpanich; Yotsawat Tawapee
- Theme music composer: Sudkhate Jungcharoen; Monton Jira
- Country of origin: Thailand
- Original language: Thai
- No. of seasons: 1
- No. of episodes: 8

Production
- Producer: Be On Cloud
- Production locations: Bangkok, Thailand
- Running time: 68 minutes
- Production company: Be On Cloud

Original release
- Network: WeTV; Channel 7; Netflix Thailand
- Release: 2 August – 20 September 2025

Shine (Thai: ชาย) is a 2025 Thai romantic historical drama television series produced by Be On Cloud and distributed by WeTV. The series aired weekly on Saturdays from August 2 to September 20, 2025, and was also broadcast on Channel 7. It joined the Netflix Thailand catalog on October 31, 2025.

== Synopsis ==
Thailand, 1969. Economist Trin returns from Paris to help his country to face necessary social reforms. His worldview is challenged through his romantic relationship with Tanwa, a carefree hippie who plays in the band Moonshine, and Victor, a headstrong student who takes part in the protests against the military dictatorship.

== Cast and characters ==
- Nattawin Wattanagitiphat (Apo) as Trin Suwannaphat
- Phakphum Romsaithong (Mile) as Tanwa Chatbodi
- Yuke Songpaisan (Son) as Colonel Krailert Suwannaphat, Trin's uncle
- Yotsawat Tawapee (Euro) as Naran Pitayatorn, a journalist
- Sinjai Plengpanich (Nok) as Mondira Techasawet (Moira), the owner of Gran Paradiso club
- Pimolrat Pisolyabutr (Kob) as Dhevi Suwannaphat, Krailert's wife
- Oabnithi Wiwattanawarang as M.L. Thanakhom, Trin's friend
- Sutatta Udomsilp (Punpun) as Daowadee Wattanapisarn, Naran's girlfriend
- Peter Deriy as Victor Boonterdtoon Salenko, a biracial student who falls in love with Trin
- Sataporn Nakwilairoj as Phadoem Chatbodi, Tanwa's father and a businessman
- Unnop Thongborisut as Veera, Krailert's driver and assistant
- Thanaporn Wagprayoon (Parn) as Num, Victor's mother
- Thanawat Sinawatra (Fuaiz) as Wut
- Athens Werapatanakul (Mio) as Tiva, a student
- Pawat Akkradetsakul (Bump) as Narong, a student
- Patiphan Fueangfunuwat (JJ) as Sucha, Tanwa's friend
- Senam Rakphu as Nuch, Victor's sister
- Gandhi Wasuwitchayagit as Commander Pracha Suttisakol

=== Guest ===
- Lisa Delamar as Claire (Ep. 1), Trin's girlfriend
- Nattasha Bunprachom (Yoghurt) as Rose
- Wongwachira Petchkeaw (Care) as Asawin
- Gasab Jumpadib as General Tird
- Totrakul Jantima (Pom) as Director General of PR Dept.

== Production ==
The series was directed by Jean Khamkwan Duangmanee and Den Panuwat Inthawat, with cinematography by Teerawat Rujintham and production design by Tum Pawas Sawatchaiyamet. Music was composed by Aek Sudkhate Jungcharoen and Jay Monton Jira.

== Reception ==
Shine received critical acclaim for its production, acting, script, and its skillful and clever portrayal of stories of love, hope, and identity.

=== Accolades ===
Name of award ceremony, year presented, award category, nominee of award, and result of nomination
Award	Year	Category	Nominee/work	Result	Ref.
Feed x Khaosod Awards	2026	Top-Tier BL Series of the Year	Shine	Won	
Feed x Khaosod Awards	2026	Boys' Love/Girls' Love Series Director of the Year	Khamkwan Duangmanee, Panuwat Inthawat and Krisda Witthayakhajorndet	Nominated	
Feed x Khaosod Awards	2026	Boys' Love Actor of the Year	Nattawin Wattanagitiphat	Nominated	
Kom Chad Luek Awards	2026	Best Supporting Actor	Yuke Songpaisan	Won	
Maya TV Awards	2025	Outstanding Couple of the Year	Yuke Songpaisan and Yotsawat Tawapee	Won	
Mchoice & Mint Awards	2025	Breakthrough Cast of the Year	Shine	Won	
Nataraja Awards	2026	Best Drama Song Award	"Am I in Love"	Nominated	
Nataraja Awards	2026	Best Cinematography Award	Teerawat Rujinatham	Nominated	
Nataraja Awards	2026	Best Art Direction Award	Pawas Sawatchaimeth	Nominated	
Nine Entertain Awards	2026	Drama-Series of the Year	Shine	Nominated	
Nine Entertain Awards	2026	Actor of the Year	Nattawin Wattanagitiphat	Nominated	
Sanook Top of the Year Awards	2025	Best BL Series	Shine	Nominated	
Sanook Top of the Year Awards	2025	Most Iconic Couple	Nattawin Wattanagitiphat and Phakphum Romsaithong	Nominated	
SEC Awards	2026	Best LGBTQ+ Series	Shine	Nominated	
SEC Awards	2026	Best Performance in an Asian Series	Phakphum Romsaithong	Nominated	
SEC Awards	2026	Favorite Couple/Ship	Trin and Tanwa	Nominated	
Thailand Box Office Awards	2025	Series of the Year (BL)	Shine	Nominated	
Thailand Box Office Awards	2025	Director of the Year (Series)	Khamkwan Duangmanee, Panuwat Inthawat and Krisda Witthayakhajorndet	Nominated	
Thailand Box Office Awards	2025	Couple of the Year (Series)	Nattawin Wattanagitiphat and Phakphum Romsaithong	Nominated	
Thailand Box Office Awards	2025	Original Song in a Series of the Year	"Am I in Love"	Nominated	
Thailand Y Content Awards	2025	Best Series	Shine	Nominated	
Thailand Y Content Awards	2025	Best Director	Krisda Witthayakhajorndet and Bhanbhassa Dhubthien	Won	
Thailand Y Content Awards	2025	Best Script	Shine	Nominated	
Thailand Y Content Awards	2025	Best Leading Actor	Nattawin Wattanagitiphat	Nominated	
Thailand Y Content Awards	2025	Best Editing	Shine	Nominated	
Thailand Y Content Awards	2025	Best Production Design	Shine	Nominated	
Thailand Y Content Awards	2025	Best Costume Design	Shine	Nominated	
Thailand Y Content Awards	2025	Best Series Soundtrack	"Am I in Love"	Won	
Thailand Y Content Awards	2025	Best Supporting Actress	Pimolrat Pisolyabutr	Won	
Thailand Y Content Awards	2025	Best Supporting Actor	Yuke Songpaisan	Won	
Thailand Y Content Awards	2025	Best Supporting Actor	Yotsawat Tawapee	Nominated	
Weibo Gala	2025	Role Model Actor	Phakphum Romsaithong	Won	
Weibo Gala	2025	Most Outstanding Actor	Nattawin Wattanagitiphat	Won	
Weibo Gala	2025	Best TV Drama Director	Krisda Witthayakhajorndet	Won	
Y Entertain Awards	2025	Best BL Series of the Year	Shine	Won	
Y Entertain Awards	2025	Leading Boys' Love Star of the Year	Phakphum Romsaithong	Won	
Y Entertain Awards	2025	Best Series OST of the Year	"Am I in Love"	Won	
Y Entertain Awards	2025	Best Y Series Director of the Year	Khamkwan Duangmanee, Panuwat Inthawat and Krisda Witthayakhajorndet	Nominated	
Y Entertain Awards	2025	Best Creative Team of the Year	Shine	Nominated	
Y Universe Awards	2025	Best Series	Shine	Nominated	
Y Universe Awards	2025	Best Production	Shine	Nominated	
Y Universe Awards	2025	Best Series Script	Shine	Nominated	
Y Universe Awards	2025	Best Cinematography	Shine	Nominated	
Y Universe Awards	2025	Best Editing	Shine	Nominated	
Y Universe Awards	2025	Best Costume Design	Shine	Nominated	
Y Universe Awards	2025	Best Television Media Reflecting Society	Shine	Won	
Y Universe Awards	2025	Best Series Director	Khamkwan Duangmanee, Panuwat Inthawat and Krisda Witthayakhajorndet	Nominated	
Y Universe Awards	2025	Best Supporting Actor/Actress	Peter Deriy	Nominated	
Y Universe Awards	2025	The Best Series OST.	"Am I in Love"	Nominated	
