= When Light Fades =

Upcoming Thai boys' love historical romance television series

- Official poster
- แสงดาว แสงศรัทธา
- Genre: Boys' love; Historical drama; Romance
- Directed by: Chokanan Skultam
- Starring: Asavapatr Ponpiboon (Bas); Lhongchang Atip Korsinka; Pentaii Natthanit Praditthan; Nam Thanabadee Wathong; Kate Cathreeya Bauwens
- Country of origin: Thailand
- Original language: Thai
- No. of seasons: 1
- No. of episodes: 10

Production
- Production companies: P.S. Performance; SMK Group; DEVA Art Theater Studio

Original release
- Network: Viu; GagaOOLala
- Release: 25 June 2026

When Light Fades (Thai: แสงดาว แสงศรัทธา) is an upcoming Thai boys' love historical romance television series produced by P.S. Performance in collaboration with SMK Group and DEVA Art Theater Studio.

Set in 1976, the series stars Asavapatr Ponpiboon (Bas) and Atip Korsinka (Lhongchang) as two young revolutionaries whose growing relationship develops amid political conflict and ideological struggle.

The series is scheduled to premiere on 25 June 2026 on Viu.

== Synopsis ==
Set against the backdrop of political unrest in Thailand during 1976, the story follows Rawin, a university student who leaves his former life behind and joins a revolutionary movement hidden deep within the forest. There, he encounters Yue, a dedicated comrade whose unwavering beliefs mask a compassionate nature.

As they spend more time together in Ban Saeng Dao, a deep bond develops between them. However, the realities of war, political commitment, and personal sacrifice force both men to confront difficult choices between their ideals and their feelings for one another.

== Cast ==
=== Main ===
- Asavapatr Ponpiboon (Bas) as Yue (สหายเยว่)
- Atip Korsinka (Lhongchang) as Rawin (รวินทร์), also known as Saeng (สหายแสง)

=== Supporting ===
- Kanvara Phumchuay as Baitong
- Pentaii Natthanit Praditthan as Dandin (Captain)
- Oat Voravudh Niyomsap as Phloeng
- Rudklao Amratisha as La-or, Rawin's mother
- Kong Montree Pattarachitphinyo as Sila, also known as Gaun Hin
- Kate Cathreeya Bauwens as Mada, also known as Ying
- Pass Patcharapon Santiporn as Fah
- Nam Thanabadee Wathong
- Heart
- Jeng
- Namnile

== Soundtrack ==
When Light Fades Soundtrack
No.	Title	Artist	Length
1.	""ขอให้เป็นเธอ""	Bas Asavapatr Ponpiboon & Lhongchang Atip Korsinka	5:10
2.	""อยู่ให้ไหว""	Boss Patiphun	5:21

== Production ==
The series is produced by P.S. Performance in collaboration with SMK Group and DEVA Art Theater Studio, with support from Thailand's Department of Cultural Promotion, the Ministry of Culture, and THACCA. An official pilot trailer was released in December 2025. By February 2026, it had surpassed one million views on YouTube and attracted international attention from audiences across Asia, Europe, and the Americas. The series is directed by Chokanan Skultam, marking his first major television series project after working in film and theatre productions.

The cast participated in multiple workshops prior to filming, including firearms training to ensure the safe handling of weapons used in the series. Principal photography took place in Pathum Thani, Saraburi and Nakhon Nayok, with approximately 80–90% of the series filmed in forest locations. A village set was specially constructed at a military camp in Pathum Thani for the production.

=== Casting ===
Lhongchang Atip Korsinka auditioned for both the roles of Rawin and Dandin before ultimately being cast as Rawin. During the audition process, he performed scenes opposite Bas Asavapatr Ponpiboon, with whom he later shared the lead roles in the series. According to Bas, he auditioned with five or six actors for the role of Rawin and felt that he and Lhongchang had good on-screen chemistry from the beginning.

== Release ==
The official trailer was released on 4 June 2026, showcasing elements of romance, historical drama, action, and comedy.

When Light Fades is scheduled to premiere on 25 June 2026 on Viu and streamed on GagaOOLala.
