= Asavapatr Ponpiboon =

Thai actor and model (born 1997)

- อัศวภัทร์ ผลพิบูลย์
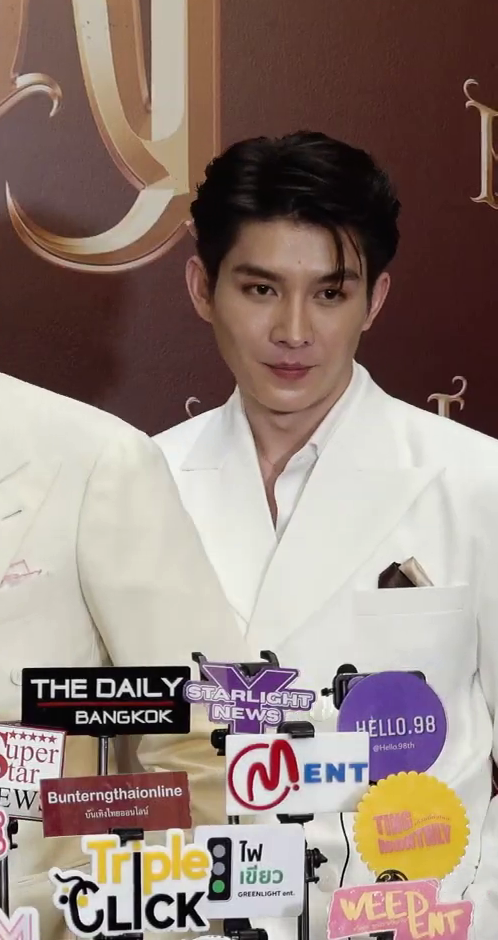
- Bas in 2023
- Born: 9 April 1997 (age 29); Thailand
- Other name: Bas (บาส)
- Occupations: Actor; Model
- Years active: 2022–present
- Agent: Be On Cloud (2022–2025)
- Notable work: KinnPorsche (2022); Man Suang (2023); 4Minutes (2024); When Light Fades (2026)
- Height: 178 cm (5 ft 10 in)

Asavapatr Ponpiboon (Thai: อัศวภัทร์ ผลพิบูลย์; born 9 April 1997), known professionally as Bas (Thai: บาส), is a Thai actor and model. He is known for portraying Arm in KinnPorsche (2022), Wan in Man Suang (2023), and Korn Korndanai Sriwatsombat in 4Minutes (2024) . In 2026, he stars in the Viu original boys' love series When Light Fades, his first leading role in a television series.

== Early life ==
Before entering the entertainment industry, Ponpiboon competed in male beauty pageants. In 2018, he was named first runner-up at the Mister Star Thailand competition, earning the opportunity to represent Thailand at Mister Grand International, where he finished in fourth place.

== Career ==
Ponpiboon made his acting debut in 2022 as Arm, one of the bodyguards of the main family in the television series KinnPorsche.

In 2023, he joined the principal cast of the historical mystery film Man Suang, portraying Wan, a close friend of the protagonist Khem. The film marked his first major feature film role and received international attention following the success of KinnPorsche.

In an interview with Vogue Thailand, Ponpiboon described the role as one of the most emotionally demanding performances of his career, citing the extensive character preparation required for the project.

In 2024, he portrayed Korn Korndanai Sriwatsombat in the fantasy drama series 4Minutes.

On 15 June 2025, Be On Cloud announced the conclusion of Ponpiboon's contract with the company, after which he became an independent artist.

In 2026, Ponpiboon was cast as Yue in the Viu original historical romance series When Light Fades, set during the political conflicts of 1970s Thailand. The role marked his first leading role in a television series.

== Filmography ==
=== Television series ===
Year	Title	Role	Network / Platform	Notes
2022	KinnPorsche	Arm	One 31 / iQIYI	Supporting role
2023	Pen Tor 2023	Art	One 31	Guest role (Episode 4)
2024	4Minutes	Korn Korndanai Sriwatsombat	Viu	Supporting role
2024	4Minutes (Sultrier Version)	Korn Korndanai Sriwatsombat	Viu	Supporting role
2025	Jet Lag	—	One 31	Guest role
2026	When Light Fades	Yue	Viu	Lead role

=== Film ===
Year	Title	Role
2023	Man Suang	Wan

=== Specials ===
Year	Title	Role	Notes
2022	KinnPorsche Side Story	Arm	Supporting role
2024	Asset of Life	Bas	Lead role

== Discography ==
=== Soundtrack appearances ===
Year	Title	Song	Notes
2026	When Light Fades	"ขอให้เป็นเธอ" ("May It Be You")	Performed with Lhongchang Atip Korsinka; original soundtrack

=== Music videos ===
Year	Song	Artist(s)	Notes
2026	"ขอให้เป็นเธอ"	Bas Asavapatr Ponpiboon and Lhongchang Atip Korsinka	Original soundtrack for When Light Fades
