= Lover Merman =

2025 Thai television series

- เพียงนาวา
- Genre: Romantic drama; Boys' Love; Fantasy
- Based on: Phiang Nawa Lover Merman by Guy Suwannaroj and Lita P.
- Written by: Tanachot Prapasri; Fluke Teerapat Lohanan
- Directed by: Rungradit Rungamonwanit
- Starring: Poon Akkharaphat; Feros Khan Chaemchoi; JJ Chalach Tantijibul; Film Jirayu Aungvanich; Dew Jiramate Srinonghang
- Country of origin: Thailand
- Original language: Thai
- No. of seasons: 1
- No. of episodes: 8

Production
- Producer: G02INFINITY
- Production location: Thailand
- Running time: 45 minutes
- Production company: G02INFINITY

Original release
- Network: Channel 7; GagaOOLala; Viki
- Release: 27 September – 22 November 2025

Lover Merman (Thai: เพียงนาวา) is a 2025 Thai romantic fantasy boys' love television series produced by G02INFINITY. It is adapted from the web novel Phiang Nawa Lover Merman written by Guy Suwannaroj and Lita P. The series premiered on Channel 7 in Thailand and is available internationally via GagaOOLala and Viki.

== Synopsis ==
Phu Phurit, a 28-year-old man from Bangkok, moves to a quiet island to help manage a nautical-themed bar called "Full and a Half" alongside his friend Phana. There, he meets Nawa, a laid-back bartender who is secretly a merman. Orphaned at 25, Nawa lives among humans while hiding his true identity. As Phu and Nawa grow closer, their bond is tested by secrets and supernatural forces.

== Cast ==
=== Main ===
- Poon Akkharaphat as Nawa
- Feros Khan Chaemchoi as Phu Phurit
- JJ Chalach Tantijibul as Phana
- Dew Jiramate Srinonghang as Ping Prakan
- Film Jirayu Aungvanich as Phraphai

=== Supporting ===
- Tan Buranrat Hombut as Phuthan
- Captain Kannatorn Charapinyo as Winyu
- Mark Apiwit Jakthreemongkol as Met
- Mork Banyawat Phatsing as Timmy
- Up Nattapum Waiwat as Mai-ek

=== Guest ===
- Nok Usanee Wattana
- Prapt Praptpadol Suwanbang
- James Punnaphat Danaiarunphat
- Fam Thanuphat Poungsuwan
- Kin Anakin Nontiprasit
- Namnung Van De Ven

== Production ==
The series is produced by G02INFINITY. On 2 December 2023, the company released a 23-second "Official Pre-Pilot" teaser on YouTube featuring actor Feros Khan Chaemchoi. A longer pilot episode was released on 16 December 2023. The official trailer premiered on 17 September 2025.

== Broadcast ==
The series aired on Channel 7 in Thailand and was available internationally on GagaOOLala and Viki.

== Awards and nominations ==
Award nominations for Lover Merman
Year	Award	Category	Nominee(s)	Result	Ref.
2026	Thailand Y Content Awards 2025	Best Special Effects	Lover Merman	Nominated	
