= Dead Friend Forever – DFF =

2023 Thai television series

- Thai: เพื่อน ตาย DFF
- Genre: Boys' love; Thriller; Drama; Action
- Written by: Kanokphan Ornrattanasakul; Issaraporn Kuntisuk; Isaree Siriwankulthon; Eakasit Thairaat
- Directed by: Chookiat Sakveerakul; Chantana Tiprachart
- Starring: Nannakun Pakapatpornpob; Phuriwat Chotiratanasak; Patiphan Fueangfunuwat; Thanawat Shinawatra; Athens Werapatanakul; Pawat Akkradetsakul; Jetsadakorn Bundit; Nititorn Akkarachotsopon; Tinnasit Isarapongporn
- Composers: Jeff Satur; Apiwat Ueathavornsuk
- Country of origin: Thailand
- Original language: Thai

Production
- Executive producer: Krisda Witthayakhajorndet
- Producer: Be On Cloud
- Cinematography: Napon Tippanya
- Running time: 45 minutes

Original release
- Release: 23 December 2023 – 9 March 2024

Dead Friend Forever – DFF (Thai: เพื่อน ตาย DFF; RTGS: Phuean Tai DFF) is a 2023 Thai boys' love thriller television series, produced by Be On Cloud. The series was directed by Chookiat Sakveerakul and Chantana Tiprachart, with a screenplay by Kanokphan Ornrattanasakul, Issaraporn Kuntisuk, Isaree Siriwankulthon and Eakasit Thairaat.

The series was developed by Be On Cloud as a project related to the reality show The Hidden Character, bringing together participants from the program and actors who had previously worked in other productions by the company.

== Synopsis ==
Eight friends travel to a vacation house in the mountains to say goodbye to Jin, who is about to study abroad. During their stay, they discover clues that a ninth person is hiding in the house. The reunion becomes marked by dangerous events and secrets connected to the group's past.

== Cast and characters ==
=== Main ===
- Nannakun Pakapatpornpob (Ta) as Ratthakiat Phromjinda (Phee)
- Phuriwat Chotiratanasak (Copper) as Jinnaphat Sukmek (Jin)
- Patiphan Fueangfunuwat (JJay) as Pariphat Wanit (Tee)
- Thanawat Shinawatra (Fuaiz) as Watcharin Siriphan (White)
- Athens Werapatanakul (Mio) as Siriwat Phatthananon (Tan)
- Pawat Akkradetsakul (Bump) as Phakhin Thianthong (Fluke)
- Jetsadakorn Bundit (Jet) as Sirawit Wibulsilp (Top)
- Nititorn Akkarachotsopon (Us) as Prachaya Suwannarat (Por)
- Tinnasit Isarapongporn (Barcode) as Thanakorn Prathipsit (Non)

=== Supporting ===
- Chalach Tantijibul (JJ) as Ratchanon Kijkarun (Keng)
- Patsarut Kooncharoen (Perth) as Perth

=== Guest ===
- Chutima Boonkarnchanarat (Ao) as Por's mother
- Kittichote Musikabhumma (Pong)
- Apivich Rinthapoln (Jade)

== Production ==
The series was produced by Be On Cloud and originated from a project related to the reality show The Hidden Character. The production brought together actors introduced through the program and performers who had previously appeared in other productions by the company.

The screenplay was written by Kanokphan Ornrattanasakul, Issaraporn Kuntisuk, Isaree Siriwankulthon and Eakasit Thairaat, while the series was directed by Chookiat Sakveerakul and Chantana Tiprachart.

== Broadcast ==
Dead Friend Forever – DFF premiered on 23 December 2023 on One 31, with episodes airing on Saturdays. The Uncovered version was made available on iQIYI. The series consists of 12 episodes and concluded on 9 March 2024.
