= Slot Machine (band) =

Thai rock band

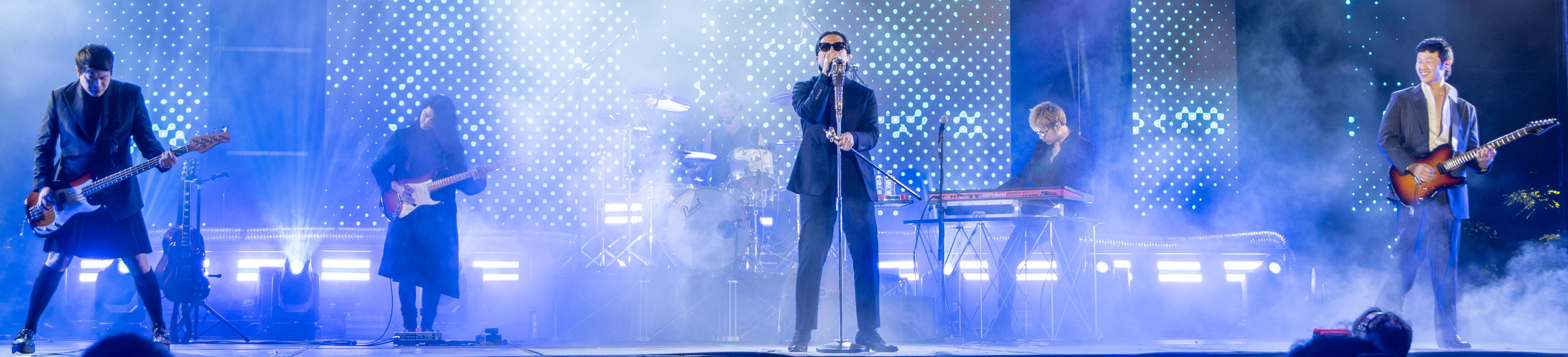
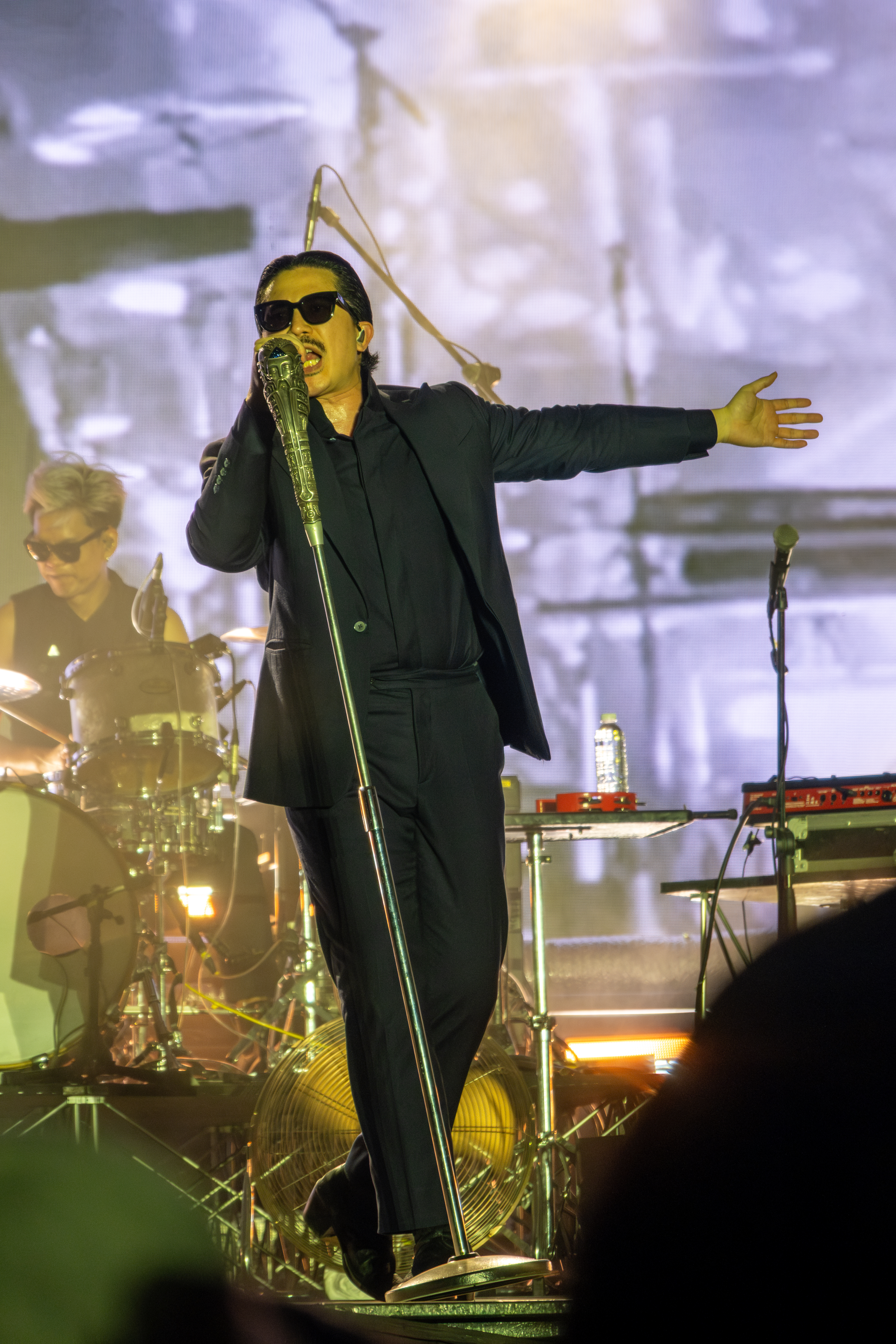
- Top: Slot Machine performing at Thammasat University Tha Prachan in 2026; Bottom: Karinyawat, lead singer

Background information
- Origin: Bangkok, Thailand
- Genres: Alternative rock, pop rock
- Years active: 2004–present
- Label: Tero
- Members: Atirath Pintong; Karinyawat Durongjirakan; Janevit Chanpanyawong
- Past members: Supon Sillapasas; Kanun Weeranarong; Porama Oupasarn; Kemsopon Wongpaisarnsin; Settharat Phangcunan
- Website: www.slotmachine.band

Slot Machine (Thai: สล็อท แมชชีน) is a Thai rock band from Bangkok formed in 2004. Their song "Phan" ("Yesterday") was awarded Song of the Year at the Seed Awards held in January 2007, "Phan" was awarded again at the 2nd Seed Awards and nominated for Rock Album of the Year, Rock Artist of the Year and Music Video of the Year. They also were awarded Band of The Year at the Nine Entertainment Awards. The band is currently signed to Tero Music and previously released a number of albums for Sony Music.

== Members ==
=== Current ===
- Karinyawat Durongjirakan (Foet) – vocals (2004–present)
- Atirath Pintong (Gak) – bass guitar (2004–present)
- Janevit Chanpanyawong (Vit) – guitar (2006–present)

=== Former ===
- Supon Sillapasas (Games) – guitar (2004)
- Kanun Weeranarong (Kon) – guitar (2004–2005)
- Porama Oupasarn (Ker) – drums (2004–2005)
- Kemsopon Wongpaisarnsin (Yut) – guitar (2006–2008)
- Settharat Pancgchunan (Auto) – drums (2006–2018)

== Discography ==
- Slot Machine (2004)
- Mutation (2006)
- Grey (2008)
- Cell (2011)
- Rainbow (2014)
- Spin the World (2016)
- Third Eye View (2020)

== Concerts ==
- Concert "Khuen Klai Punn" – December 24, 2006 at EVI Place Soi Sukhumvit 63 (Ekkamai)
- Slot Machine: The first contact - September 27, 2013 at Impact Arena MuangThongThani
- Slot Machine: The Mothership Concert - August 26, 2017
- Slot Machine: Exit to Enter World tour In Bangkok - February 16, 2024
- Slot Machine: Exit to Enter World tour In Taipei, Taiwan - March 2, 2024
- Slot Machine: Exit to Enter World tour In Mexico (Vive Latino Festival) - March 17, 2024
- Slot Machine: Exit to Enter World tour In Singapore - April 20, 2024

== Awards and nominations ==
Year	Association	Category	Nominated work	Result
2007	SEED Award	Song of the Year	"Phan" (Yesterday)	Won
2010	Fat Radio Awards	Record of the Year	"Chan Chao" (Goodbye)	Won
2010	Channel V Thailand Awards	Best Cinematography Music Video	"Chan Chao" (Goodbye)	Won
2011	Channel V Thailand Awards	Album of the Year	Cell	Won
2011	The Guitar Mag Awards	Best Style Artist	Slot Machine	Won
2011	Kom Chad Luek Awards	Best Group Artists	Slot Machine	Won
2011	Kom Chad Luek Awards	Album of the Year	Cell	Won
2012	Nine Entertain Awards	Best Group Artists	Slot Machine	Won
2012	Season Awards	Best Group Artists	Slot Machine	Won
2012	Season Awards	Album of the Year	Cell	Won
2013	MTV Europe Music Awards	Best South East Asian Act	Slot Machine	Nominated
2014	MTV Europe Music Awards	Best South East Asian Act	Slot Machine	Nominated
2015	MTV Europe Music Awards	Best South East Asian Act	Slot Machine	Nominated
2016	Classic Rock Awards	Asian Performance	Slot Machine	Won
2016	Prudential Eyes Awards	Visual & Popular Culture Award	Slot Machine	Won
2017	GQ Men of The Year	Gold Record	Slot Machine	Won
2018	MTV Europe Music Awards	Best South East Asian Act	Slot Machine	Nominated
2019	Nine Entertain Awards	2019 Group of the Year	Slot Machine	Won
