= KinnPorsche =

2022 Thai television series

- Promotional poster
- Also known as: KinnPorsche: The Series: รักโคตรร้าย สุดท้ายโคตรรัก
- Genre: Boys' love; Action; Romance
- Based on: KinnPorsche Story: รักโคตรร้าย สุดท้ายโคตรรัก by: Daemi
- Written by: Patchayamon Theewasujaroen; Sitthichai Panya; Krisda Witthayakhajorndet; Bhanbhassa Dhubthien
- Directed by: Kongkiat Komesiri; Krisda Witthayakhajorndet; Banchorn Vorasataree
- Starring: Phakphum Romsaithong; Nattawin Wattanagitiphat
- Opening theme: "เพียงไว้ใจ (PhiangWaichai)" by Slot Machine
- Ending theme: "Free Fall" by Slot Machine (since Episode 1); "แค่เธอ" (Why Don't You Stay) by Jeff Satur (since Episode 7)
- Country of origin: Thailand
- Original language: Thai
- No. of episodes: 14

Production
- Executive producer: Krisda Witthayakhajorndet
- Producer: Banchorn Vorasataree
- Cinematography: Maneerat Srinakarin
- Running time: 45-60 minutes
- Production company: Be On Cloud

Original release
- Network: One 31
- Release: 2 April – 9 July 2022

KinnPorsche is a 2022 Thai action-boy's love television series based on a web novel of the same name by writing duo Daemi. It stars Phakphum Romsaithong as Kinn and Nattawin Wattanagitiphat as Porsche. The series follows Porsche, desperate to make money and take care of his younger brother, as he finds himself drawn into the mafia underworld by Kinn. The series is directed by Kongkiat Komesiri, Krisda Witthayakhajorndet, and Banchorn Vorasataree. It premiered in Thailand on One 31 on 2 April 2022, airing every Saturday at 23:00 ICT, while it was distributed in Japan through U-Next and worldwide on iQIYI. The full uncut version, called KinnPorsche: La Forte aired one hour later on iQIYI.

== Synopsis ==
Kinn Anakinn Theerapanyakun, the second son and de facto heir of the Theerapanyakun crime family, is attacked on his way home from making a business deal. While running for his life, he stumbles across Porsche Pachara Kittisawasd, a local bartender and underground fighter. Kinn pays Porsche to protect him from the men trying to kill him. Impressed by Porsche's fighting abilities, Kinn tracks him down to offer him a job.

In order to make enough money to send his younger brother Porchay to university, and to keep the house that had belonged to their dead parents, Porsche reluctantly agrees to become Kinn's full-time bodyguard. Over the next few months, he improves his fighting skills and learns about the dark underworld he now belongs to, but also begins to fall in love with his charismatic boss.

Even though Kinn is unashamedly gay, the path ahead isn't easy for the two lovers. The minor branch of the family, ruled by Kinn's uncle, is desperate to take control. His father is in poor health, his older brother is a PTSD-stricken mess, his younger brother is a rising star, and Vegas, his cousin from the minor family is also becoming a rising threat to him; also the mystery of Porsche's parents' untimely death seems somehow tied to the Theerapanyakun family.

== Cast and characters ==
=== Main ===
- Phakphum Romsaithong (Mile) as Kinn Anakinn Theerapanyakun, the second son and heir presumptive to the Theerapanyakun crime family's main branch.
- Nattawin Wattanagitiphat (Apo) as Porsche Pachara Kittisawasd, local bartender and underground fighter.
  - Pasin Cahanding as young Porsche

=== Supporting ===
- Wichapas Sumettikul (Bible) as Vegas Kornwit Theerapanyakun, the eldest son and the heir apparent of the Theerapanyakun crime family's secondary branch. Kinn's cousin. He also takes a liking to Porsche.
- Jakapan Puttha (Build) as Pete Phongsakorn Saengtham, Tankhun's head bodyguard and Porsche's roommate at the Theerapanyakun compound.
- Jeff Satur as Kim Kimhan Theerapanyakun, Kinn's pop star younger brother who feigns disinterest in the family business, but is secretly just as ruthless as his father and brother. He takes an interest in Porchay.
- Tinnasit Isarapongporn (Barcode) as Porchay Pitchaya Kittisawasd, Porsche's younger brother who is trying to get into a prestigious music program at university.

=== Recurring ===
==== People around Porsche ====
- Patteerat Laemluang (Sprite) as Yok, the owner of HUM bar, where Porsche was her star bartender.
- Touchchavit Kulkranchang (Ping) as Jom, Porsche's friend.
- Pongsakorn Ponsantigul (Pong) as Tem, Porsche's friend.
- Thanavate Siriwattanagul (Gap) as Arthee, Porsche and Porschay's uncle with a gambling addiction.
- Sarucha Phongsongkul (Annita) as Namphueng Kittisawasd, Porsche and Porchay's mother.

==== People around Kinn ====
- Nititorn Akkarachotsopon (Us) as Tay, Kinn's friend who is in a relationship with Time.
- Chalach Tantijibul (2J) as Time, Kinn's friend who is in a relationship with Tay.
- Nutthasid Panyagarm (Nodt) as Big, Kinn's bodyguard who is later reassigned to Kim.
- Nakhun Screaigh (Perth) as Ken, Kinn's bodyguard.
- Naphat Vikairungroj (Na) as Tawan, Kinn's ex-boyfriend.

==== Theerapanyakun main family ====
- Songsit Roongnophakunsri (Kob) as Korn Theerapanyakun, Kinn's father and head of the Theerapanyakun family. Kun's older brother.
- Thanayut Thakoonauttaya (Tong) as Tankhun Theerapanyakun, Kinn's eccentric older brother who has PTSD and no longer wants to rule the family.
- Asavapatr Ponpiboon (Bas) as Arm, Tankhun's bodyguard and the most tech-savvy of the Theerapanyakun bodyguards.
- Yosatorn Konglikit (Job) as Pol, one of Tankhun's bodyguards.
- Peter Knight as Chan, Korn's bodyguard and the leader of all the Theerapanyakun bodyguards.

==== Theerapanyakun minor family ====
- Piya Vimuktayon (Ex) as Kun Theerapanyakun, Korn's younger brother and Kinn's uncle who is at odds with the main family branch. Father of Vegas and Macau.
- Nannakun Pakapatpornpob (Ta) as Macau Theerapanyakun, the second and youngest son of the Theerapanyakun crime family's secondary branch.

== Production ==
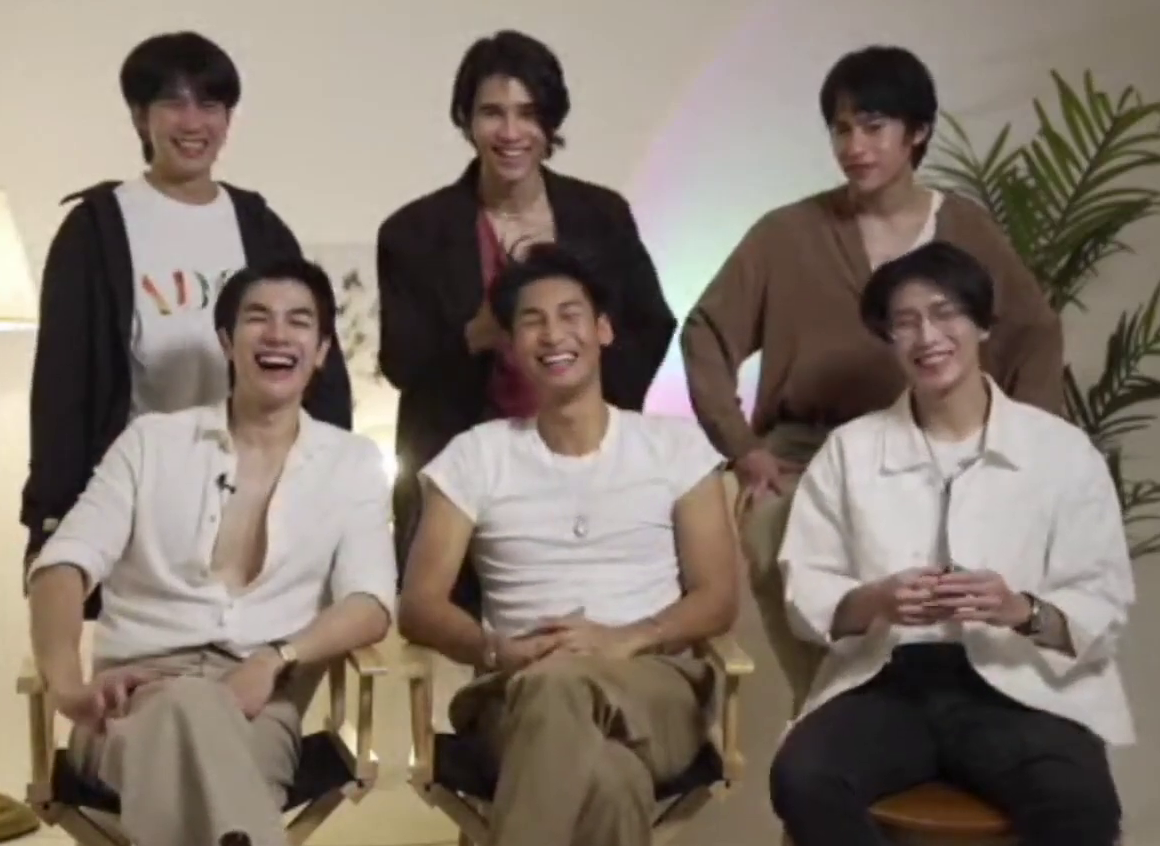
The main cast of the series, from the left, clockwise: Puttha, Satur, Isarapongporn, Sumettikul, Wattanagitiphat and Romsaithong.

In September 2020, production company Filmania announced the web-novel KinnPorsche Story: Fierce Love, Finally Love (KinnPorsche Story: รักโคตรร้าย สุดท้ายโคตรรัก) would be adapted into a television series. After releasing a teaser trailer in January 2021, Filmania held a press conference and traditional worship ceremony to kick off the beginning of the project in March.

In early July 2021, at filming almost completed, the writing duo Daemi of the original web-novel announced their departure from Filmania due to creative differences. Seeing the potential of the series and the efforts put in by the rest of the cast, actor Phakphum Romsaithong, who had been cast for the main role of Kinn, contacted his friend and director Krisda Witthayakhajorndet, who was also an executive at the production company Be On Cloud. KinnPorsche was subsequently picked up by Be On Cloud, which announced it would have undergone some changes. In late August 2021, the new production company released a new teaser and the series title was shortened to KinnPorsche: The Series. In November 2021, a press conference was held where the new cast was officially confirmed and a collaboration with rock band Slot Machine was announced. Also in November, it was announced that KinnPorsche would be iQIYI's first Thai original series.

In March 2022 it was announced that iQIYI would release the uncut version, called KinnPorsche: La Forte.

Romsaithong decided to appear in the series because he thought the gangster theme had a lot of potential and to experience something new, while Wattanagitiphat to challenge a different series than soap operas.

== Episodes ==
No.	Title	Original release date
1	"Episode 1"	2 April 2022
After Kinn's first major deal with the Italian mafia ends in a bloody street chase, he encounters Porsche in the back of Hum Bar. In a rapid exchange, Porsche agrees to help him with his pursuers, for a fee. After escaping, Kinn reneges on the deal and Porsche takes his watch as payment. Back home, Porsche discovers the loan sharks have appeared again. Porsche is the sole caretaker of his younger brother, Porchay (Chay), juggling payments for the house and his brother's education. His uncle takes the watch to hock while Porsche heads to his other sideline job as an underground fighter, The Phoenix, to scrap together some additional money. Meanwhile Kinn is pressured by his father, Korn, to track down Porsche and offer him a bodyguard job. Kinn kidnaps Porsche, attempting to intimidate him into taking the job, but after a heated fight, Porsche rejects the offer, and escapes. Unfortunately, Porsche's uncle has dug them even deeper into financial trouble, and Porsche finds accepting Kinn's offer is the only way to keep his brother safe and secure. He leaves a note for his brother, lying that he is accepting a dream job working as a bartender at a private beach bar, before joining Kinn at the mafia compound.
2	"Episode 2"	9 April 2022
Porsche struggles to adjust in the new environment and responsibilities as a bodyguard for Kinn. Although despised by bodyguards Big and Ken, Porsche becomes quick friends with his roommate Pete. Porsche accidentally kills the elder son Tankhun's prized carps, resulting in him becoming protective of the garden so he doesn't get punished. Later, his first mission is a disaster when he gets drunk and an assassin nearly kills Kinn. After Porsche punches Macau, Kinn and Tankhun's cousin, when he gets too close to the carp pond, a delighted Tankhun takes Porsche as his own bodyguard.
3	"Episode 3"	23 April 2022
Porsche introduces Tankhun and his bodyguards to Hum Bar. Pete, Arm and Pol are more supportive in Porsche's training than Ken and Big, and Porsche's skills develop quickly. Porsche eventually grows bored with Tankhun's antics and joins Pete and Ken in escorting Kinn. Although extremely uncomfortable with the realities of Kinn's business, Porsche winds up taking a bullet for Kinn when the meeting goes sour. Impressed by Porche's handling of the situation, Kinn helps him with his wound. That night, Tankhun and his bodyguards take Porsche out to celebrate his "recovery" and are joined by Kinn. A drunk Kinn kisses Porsche.
4	"Episode 4"	30 April 2022
Vegas visits the main family to talk of the upcoming diamond auction, and has lunch with Kinn and the bodyguards, where it becomes obvious that he's interested in Porsche. Tankhun hates the attention Porsche is getting and gives Porsche back to Kinn. Jealous of Porsche, Big tricks him into catching Kinn in flagrante delicto with another man. At the diamond auction, Porsche gets drugged with GHB, or Gamma Hydroxybutyrate, a date rape drug, on the orders of Vegas. Porsche is kidnapped and Vegas attempts to give him a love bite as a "souvenir" to make Kinn angry. However, Kinn and his bodyguards find Porsche, with Vegas escaping before anything happens. While trying to get Porsche sober, Kinn gives into his desires and takes advantage of him. Meanwhile, at his university Porchay meets Kim, Kinn's younger brother, who keeps his interest in Porsche a secret.
5	"Episode 5"	7 May 2022
While struggling with the events of the previous night, Porsche is punished for allowing himself to be drugged. Korn, angered at Kinn's indiscretion, gives Porsche a week off for him to decide on his future. Kinn learns this from Pete, who also imparts some advice on how Kinn can win Porsche over. Kinn visits Porsche at home, but leaves his bodyguards behind, leading to both of them being kidnapped. Korn tracks Kinn's phone and dispatches all the bodyguards to rescue them. Kinn and Porsche manage to free themselves just before the bodyguards cause the truck they're in to crash. Meanwhile, Kim agrees to tutor Porchay as a means of investigating Porsche.
6	"Episode 6"	14 May 2022
After escaping the accident, Kinn and Porsche are stuck in the wilderness. As the days pass they learn to rely on each other and grow closer. Porsche indicates that he is willing to return Kinn's feelings, but the mafioso initially holds back. After sharing their dreams for different lives and getting stuck in a cave, Kinn explains that he's never slept with a bodyguard before and asks Porsche for forgiveness for everything he's done. After escaping, Kinn tells Porsche to go home and live a normal life. When the kidnappers finally track them down, Porsche comes back, but Kinn takes a bullet for him.
7	"Episode 7"	21 May 2022
After being rescued by the bodyguards, Kinn is in the hospital and Porsche spearheads a sting to find out the kidnappers' identity. Vegas gate-crashes the sting and promises to help find the culprit, in exchange for Porsche. Kinn is forced to agree but makes Porsche promise to come back to him. Porsche and Vegas discover a link between one of the smaller triads and the Italian Mafia. Kinn takes his friends' advice and opens up to Porsche by loaning him his lucky gun, but Vegas reveals Kinn's dark secret to Porsche. The assault on the Mafia's operation is a success and Vegas hosts a party to celebrate. During the party, Vegas's attempts to seduce Porsche are interrupted by Kinn. Porsche confronts Kinn about his secret and his treatment of him; upon seeing his genuinely regretful attitude, Porsche consents to sex. Meanwhile, Kim tries to find out more about Porsche, but only succeeds in learning that Porchay is in love with his idol persona. Note: iQiyi released a "side story" on YouTube which bridged the gap between episodes 6 and 7. Tankhun and the bodyguards hold vigil over Kinn while Vegas tries to win Porsche over. When Kinn wakes up, he and Porsche tentatively kick-start their relationship by sharing Kinn's hospital bed.
8	"Episode 8"	28 May 2022
Miraculously, Kinn and Porsche's attempts to keep their relationship secret are successful on the bodyguards. Having never really dated anyone, let alone a man, Porsche goes to Yok for advice. Porsche's overzealous plans for the perfect day are well-received by Kinn. Porsche begins seeing a strange man whenever he and Kinn are together in public; after a series of mishaps, Pete identifies him as Kinn's (deceased) ex, Tawan. Meanwhile, Kim looks into Porsche and Porchay's parents' deaths and realizes that his feelings for Porchay are more complicated than he thought.
9	"Episode 9"	4 June 2022
Tawan offers to help the main family in taking down the Italian mafia in exchange for protection, but also sets about trying to win back Kinn. Arm, having deduced that Kinn and Porsche are an item, helps the latter with keeping tabs on Tawan. At the same time, Kinn tasks Pete with monitoring Vegas, as he believes his cousin is the mastermind behind the Italian mafia, but his efforts are stymied. When Porsche's attempt at surveillance is caught, Kinn turns on him, imprisoning his lover. Meanwhile, Porchay finally tells Kim how he feels and the two kiss.
10	"Episode 10"	11 June 2022
Kinn allows Porsche to flee with Vegas. Pete goes undercover to expose Vegas but is caught by Ken, who is a mole for Kun and has been working with Vegas. Porchay is kidnapped by Tawan, who is in love with Vegas and has been plotting with him to take down the major family. Kim manages to rescue Porchay, but Big sacrifices himself for Porsche. Realizing that Vegas has abandoned him, Tawan shoots himself. Kun kills Ken, while Pete is tortured by Vegas.
11	"Episode 11"	18 June 2022
Kinn tries to get Porsche released and is forced to reveal their relationship, much to the delight of Tankhun and the bodyguards. Korn removes Porsche as Kinn's bodyguard but insists that Porsche and Porchay move into the main family compound. While struggling to adapt to the circumstances, Chay learns the truth about Kim and is heartbroken. Vegas takes Pete into hiding with him, continuing his sadistic torture; eventually however, they begin to bond.
12	"Episode 12"	25 June 2022
Porsche learns that Kinn manipulated him into working for the Theerapanyakuns on Korn's order. When confronted, Korn explains that a friend of his was behind the car accident that killed Porsche's parents. Kinn, Porsche, and Chay move out of the family compound. Chay, still reeling from Kim's revelation, skips his audition and turns to drugs and alcohol; Kim gets frustrated trying to set him straight. Meanwhile, Pete decides to stay with Vegas upon seeing how lonely and emotional he really is, and the two engage in sex. After Korn tells him where to find his parents' killer, Porsche considers killing him, but can't go through with it. He is later contacted by his uncle, who asks for money and gives him a family photo depicting child Porsche and Porchay, their parents and Kinn's dad.
13	"Episode 13"	2 July 2022
Vegas takes out his frustrations with Kun on Pete, who escapes and returns to the main family just as Tankhun's histrionics peak. As Kim realizes that he loves Chay, Porsche enlists Vegas in his quest for answers, in exchange for the chance to apologize to Pete. Porsche's uncle reveals that his parents weren't killed in a car accident, but were shot by Korn. When Porsche confronts Korn, the older man tells him Porsche's mother was his sister.
14	"Episode 14"	9 July 2022
After revealing that Porsche's mother was his foster sister and that she was killed by Kun, Korn dies of poisoning. In the midst of the minor family's attempt to take over, it is revealed that Porsche's mother is still alive, but has lost her memory and has been kept hidden to protect her from Kun, who had been molesting her. Korn, who had staged his death, kills Kun, while Pete resigns to stay with his lover. Korn appoints Porsche as new head of the minor family.

== Original soundtrack ==
KinnPorsche The Series: Original Soundtrack

Soundtrack album by Various
- Released: September 16, 2022
- Genre: Soundtrack
- Languages: Thai; English
- Label: Tero Entertainment

For the soundtrack, KinnPorsche partnered with Slot Machine and composer Therdsak Chanpan. The Thai rock band sang two songs for the series, namely "PhiangWaichai" (เพียงไว้ใจ) and its English version "Free Fall", both produced by Thitiwat Rongthong of The Darkest Romance. The series' soundtrack also features "Why Don't You Stay" (แค่เธอ) by Jeff Satur, "This Song is Called You" (เพลงนี้ชื่อว่าเธอ) by Barcode Tinnasit Isarapongporn, and "Controversy" (ย้อนแย้ง) by Aek Season Five.

No.	Title	Artist	Length
1.	"PhiangWaichai" (เพียงไว้ใจ)	Slot Machine	3:46
2.	"Free Fall"	Slot Machine	3:46
3.	"Why Don't You Stay" (แค่เธอ)	Jeff Satur	3:48
4.	"This Song is Called You" (เพลงนี้ชื่อว่าเธอ)	Barcode Tinnasit Isarapongporn	3:59
5.	"Controversy" (ย้อนแย้ง)	Aek Season Five	3:47
6.	"Why Don't You Stay (WorldTour Ver.)"	Jeff Satur	4:16
7.	"Free Fall (Lovely Mood)"	Slot Machine	0:57
8.	"Free Fall (Love)"	Slot Machine	2:13
9.	"Free Fall (Love 2)"	Slot Machine	1:56
10.	"Free Fall (Acoustic 1)"	Slot Machine	1:48
11.	"Free Fall (Acoustic 2)"	Slot Machine	2:07
12.	"Free Fall (Acoustic 3)"	Slot Machine	2:23
13.	"Free Fall (Sad Mood)"	Slot Machine	1:59
14.	"Free Fall (Suspense)"	Slot Machine	2:24
15.	"Free Fall (Heroic Mood)"	Slot Machine	2:34
16.	"Free Fall (Action)"	Slot Machine	2:00
Total length:			43:43

== Tour ==
On 1 June 2022, Be On Cloud announced that there would be a KinnPorsche World Tour in collaboration with Live Nation Asia involving 16 of the series' cast members and the band Slot Machine.

The world tour debut on 24 and 25 July at the Impact Arena in Bangkok saw two sold-out shows with more than 20,000 fans in attendance, and included exclusive appearances from cast members who did not sign up for the rest of the tour. The Asian leg of the tour took place between September and October of the same year in Singapore (The Star Theatre, 8 October), Seoul (KBS Arena, 16 October), Manila (SM Mall of Asia, 22 October), and Taipei (Taipei International Convention Centre, 30 October). A Vietnamese stop, originally scheduled for 28 October at the Phu Tho Indoor Stadium in Ho Chi Minh City, was postponed on 22 September and then announced for 11 February 2023 at Saigon Exhibition and Convention Center (SECC). It was once again canceled on 6 February due to threats against the actors. The tour held its final show in Bangkok on 25 February.

Throughout the tour, Be On Cloud uploaded Behind the Show videos to their YouTube channel, which documented the cast's experience of preparing for and putting on the show at each tour stop.

== Reception ==
Upon release, KinnPorsche trended worldwide on YouTube, Instagram and Twitter after each episode, with the two main actors gaining million of followers and global stardom. The first episode topped iQIYI streaming charts in 191 territories.

Rolling Stone India noted the dark, vicious and explicit atmosphere, praising the cast's chemistry and performances. Some dubbed it as the Euphoria of the BL world, and it was also praised for its action theme. It was featured on Teen Vogue's best BL dramas of 2022 list for being "a thrilling, lush and gargantuan tale of love and sin."

=== Viewership ===
In the table below, the blue number represents the lowest ratings and the red number represents the highest ratings.

Episode No.	Timeslot (UTC+07:00)	Air date	Average audience share	Ref.
1	Saturday 11:00 pm	2 April 2022	0.151%	
2	Saturday 11:00 pm	9 April 2022	0.146%	
3	Saturday 11:00 pm	23 April 2022	0.231%	
4	Saturday 11:00 pm	30 April 2022	0.154%	
5	Saturday 11:00 pm	7 May 2022	0.323%	
6	Saturday 11:00 pm	14 May 2022	0.351%	
7	Saturday 11:00 pm	21 May 2022	0.223%	
8	Saturday 11:00 pm	28 May 2022	0.314%	
9	Saturday 11:00 pm	4 June 2022	0.219%	
10	Saturday 11:00 pm	11 June 2022	0.219%	
11	Saturday 11:00 pm	18 June 2022	0.386%	
12	Saturday 11:00 pm	25 June 2022	0.303%	
13	Saturday 11:00 pm	2 July 2022	0.380%	
14	Saturday 11:00 pm	9 July 2022	0.362%	
Average			0.314% ^{1}	

^1 Based on the average audience share per episode.

=== Awards and nominations ===
Name of award ceremony, year presented, award category, nominee of award, and result of nomination
Award	Year	Category	Nominee/work	Result	Ref.
Feed Y Capital Awards	2022	Y Series of the Year Award	KinnPorsche: The Series	Won	
GQ Thailand Men of the Year Awards	2022	Breakthrough Actors	Phakphum Romsaithong and Nattawin Wattanagitiphat	Won	
Kazz Awards	2023	Shining Star of the Year, Male	Tinnasit Isarapongporn	Won	
Kazz Awards	2023	Best Young Man of the Year	Wichapas Sumettikul	Won	
Kom Chad Luek Awards	2023	Best Song	"PhiangWaichai" by Slot Machine	Nominated	
MChoice Mint Awards	2022	Breakthrough Cast of 2022	KinnPorsche: The Series	Won	
National Radio and Television Awards	2023	Best Y Series of the Year Award	KinnPorsche: The Series	Won	
Nine Entertain Awards	2023	Public's Favorite	Phakphum Romsaithong and Nattawin Wattanagitiphat	Nominated	
T-Pop of the Year Music Awards	2023	Best Music of the Year (OST)	"Why Don't You Stay" (แค่เธอ) by Jeff Satur	Nominated	
Thailand Social Awards	2023	Best Content Performance on Social Media (Thai Series)	KinnPorsche: The Series	Won	
TikTok Awards Thailand	2022	Rising Star of the Year	Tinnasit Isarapongporn	Won	
YUniverse Awards	2022	Best Production	KinnPorsche: The Series	Won	
YUniverse Awards	2022	Best OST for a Series	"Why Don't You Stay" (แค่เธอ) by Jeff Satur	Won	
YUniverse Awards	2022	Best Supporting Actor	Songsit Roongnophakunsri	Won	
YUniverse Awards	2022	Best Baddies	Naphat Vikairungroj	Nominated	
YUniverse Awards	2022	Best Cuties	Tinnasit Isarapongporn	Nominated	
YUniverse Awards	2022	Best Supportive Friend	Patteerat Laemluang	Nominated	
