= Felizz =

Thai girl group

Felizz เฟลิส
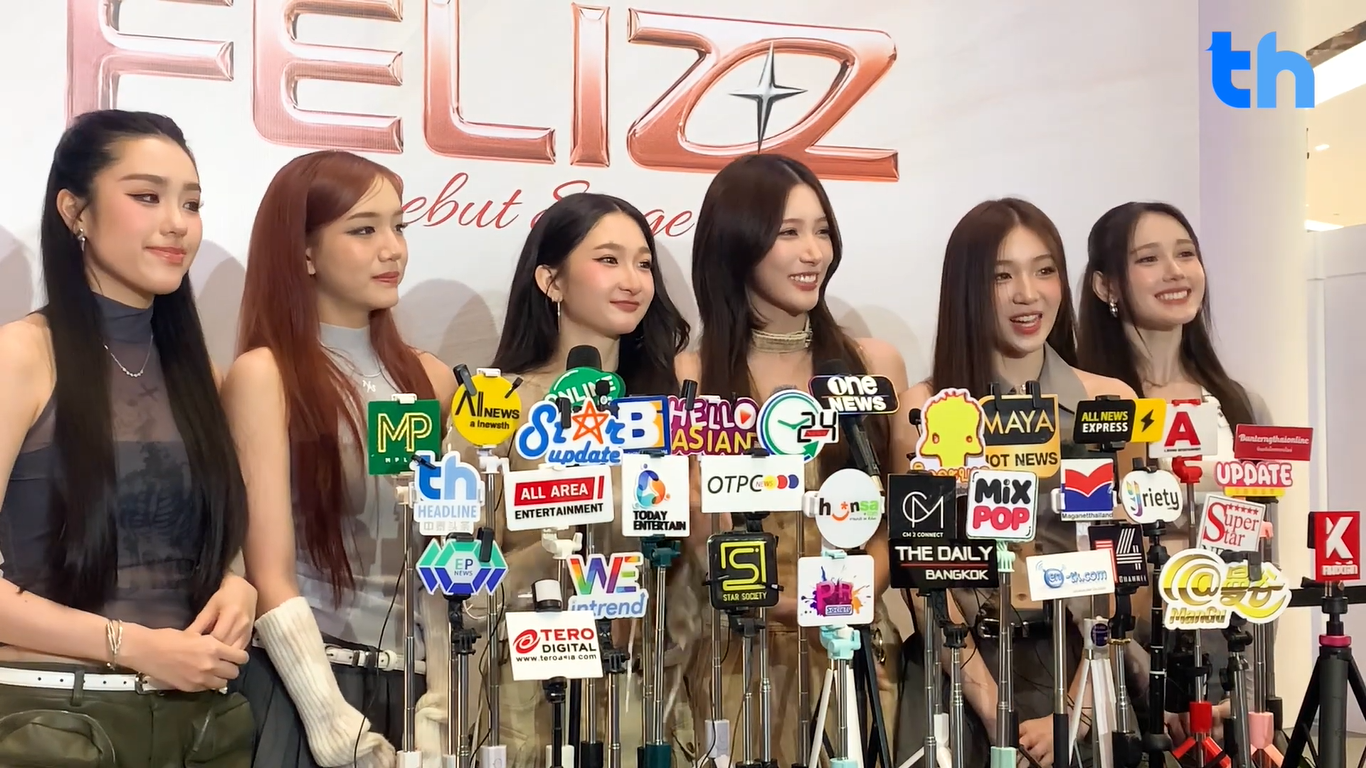
- Felizz in May 2025; Left to Right: Chelsea, Sangt, Pream, Jaoying, Acare and Chari

Background information
- Origin: Bangkok, Thailand
- Genre: T-pop
- Years active: 2025–present
- Label: Riser Music
- Members: Chari; Jaoying; Chelsea; Pream; Acare; Sangt
- Website: gmm-tv.com

Felizz (Thai: เฟลิส, stylized as FELIZZ), formerly known as Riser Rookies, is a Thai girl group launched by Riser Music. All members are actresses under the television production and talent agency GMMTV. The group consists of six members: Chari, Jaoying, Chelsea, Pream, Acare and Sangt.

They debuted on May 23, 2025 with the single "See Through".

== History ==
=== Pre-debut activities ===
Jaoying, Chelsea, Pream and Acare all competed in various televised idol competitions before and whilst signed with GMMTV. Sangt was a finalist in GMMTV's competition Thailand School Star 2024. Chari is a former member of Born Never Die under 4nologue and Pream is a former member of Celeste under VCM Entertainment. Jaoying, Pream and Acare all competed on Chuang Asia: Thailand together.

On November 26, 2024, during the "GMMTV 2025: Rising the Wave" event, it was revealed that Riser Music had started training a new girl group under the name Riser Rookies, with the aim to transform rookies into artists in their craft. During this pre-debut era, the Riser Rookies would cover various performances from the other members of the Riser Music label with original choreography to build their fanbase and show off their skills.

=== Debut ===
On May 16, 2025, the group's name was revealed as Felizz and they debuted on May 23, 2025 with the digital single "See Through". Felizz is a stylized variation of the Spanish and Portuguese word feliz, meaning "happy", combined with a playful, feline double-z. Their slogan is "Cat-girls never chase. We attract."

== Members ==
- Chari (Thai: ชาริ)
- Jaoying (Thai: เจ้าหญิง)
- Chelsea (Thai: เชลซี)
- Pream (Thai: พรีม)
- Acare (Thai: เอแคร์)
- Sangt (Thai: แซงต์)

== Discography ==
=== Digital singles ===
Title	Year	Ref.
"(See Through)"	2025	
"จงรัก จงหลง (Abracadabra)"	2025	
"เริ่ด (SLAY)"	2025	
"มีแมวไหม (Cat Me If You Can)" Feat. Lego	2026	
"Friend List"	2026	

==== Soundtrack appearances ====
Title	Year	Album	Ref.
"จงรัก จงหลง (Abracadabra)"	2025	MuTeLuv OST	

=== Covers ===
Title	Year	Cover artist(s)	Original artist(s)	Ref.
"Santa Doesn't Know You Like I Do"	2024	Riser Rookies	Sabrina Carpenter	
"จงรัก จงหลง (Candidate)"	2025	Riser Rookies	Fourth	
"Die With A Smile"	2025	Riser Rookies	Lady Gaga and Bruno Mars	
"แรงอีกนิด (Sadistic)"	2025	Riser Rookies	JASP.ER	
"5CM" ThamePo: Heart That Skips a Beat OST	2025	Riser Rookies	William Jakrapatr	
"UMM UMM"	2025	Riser Rookies, Lego	LYKN	
"Knock Knock"	2025	Chari, Sangt, Barcode	Nanon and Jorin 4Eve	
"รักแรก (First Love)"	2025	Jaoying, Acare, Emi, Bonnie	Nont Tanont	
"Yummy"	2025	Chelsea, Pream, Santa	Justin Bieber	
"ดึกมากแล้ว (Night Ride)"	2025	Felizz	Win Metawin (feat. Badmixy)	
"น้ำหยดลงหิน (DRIP)" (prod. URBOYTJ)	2025	Felizz	LYKN	
"ใกล้เกิน (Too Close To Handle)"	2025	Felizz	Gemini	
"Versace on the Floor"	2026	Chari, Jaoying	Bruno Mars	
"Siren"	2026	Chelsea, Pream	RIIZE	
"ติดเธอซะก่อน (Sweet Baby)"	2026	Acare, Sangt	JAONAAY	
"ภาพสุดท้าย (Last Twilight)" Last Twilight OST	2026	Felizz	William Jakrapatr	
"Touch"	2026	Felizz	JASP.ER	
"มากกว่าที่รัก (More Than Words)" Us OST	2026	Acare	Emi Thasorn	
"ถ้าเกิด (If Only)"	2026	Chari	LYKN	
"เทสดี (Tasty)"	2026	Chelsea	NUTDAN	
"ถูกสเปก (Let's Go)"	2026	Sangt	HONGSHI	
"งั้นรักละ (Don't Wanna, but I Do)" Enemies with Benefits OST	2026	Jaoying	Jan Ployshompoo and JingJing Yu	
"Dangerous"	2026	Pream	Gemini	

== Filmography ==
=== Online shows ===
Year	Title	Notes	Ref.
2025–present	FELIZZ Pawty Time	Q&A session-style vlogs	
2025–present	FELIZZ: Behind the Song	Behind-the-scenes footage from Felizz vocal practices	
2025–present	FELIZZ: Behind the Scenes	Behind-the-scenes footage from Felizz music videos	
2025–present	Behind the PAWS	Behind-the-scenes footage from Felizz concerts	

== Concerts ==
=== Riser Rookies ===
Title	Date	Venue	Ref.
Flex FanDay 2025	March 22, 2025	Union Hall, Union Mall	
RangNam Beach Party by SUPERFLUID	April 15, 2025	Kingpower RangNam	

=== Felizz ===
Title	Date	Venue	Ref.
GMMTV Starlympics 2025	December 20, 2025	Impact Arena, Muang Thong Thani	
Riser Concert: The First Rise	February 13–15, 2026	Impact Arena, Muang Thong Thani	
JoongDunk Eyes On You Fancon	April 6, 2026	Union Hall, Union Mall	
Clo'ver & Felizz T-Pop Showcase	May 3, 2026	Hanaspace, Taipei	
GMMTV Riser Music T-Pop Showcase Tokyo	May 8, 2026	Hokutopia Sakura Hall, Tokyo	
26th Thai Festival in Tokyo	May 9, 2026	Yoyogi Park, Shibuya Ward, Tokyo	
GMMTV Musicon Singapore	May 30–31, 2026	Singapore Expo	
Gotchapop Concert 4	June 6, 2026	Queen Sirikit National Convention Center	
"มิตรTime" at Samyan Mitrtown Vol. 2	June 20, 2026	Samyan Mitrtown	
Monster Music Festival 2026	July 25, 2026	Queen Sirikit National Convention Center	
Felizz & Clo'ver Happening Stage	August 5, 2026	One Bangkok Park	
Nineentertain 24th Anniversary Charity Concert	September 30, 2026	Parc Paragon, Siam Paragon	
Oh My Fourth Concert	October 18, 2026	BITEC Live	
