= Chompoopuntip Temtanamongkol =

Thai singer and actress (born 2007)

- ชมพูพันธุ์ทิพย์ เต็มธนมงคล
- Born: 3 April 2007 (age 19); Bangkok, Thailand
- Other names: Acare (เอแคร์), Eclair (เอแคลร์), Huang Xiner (黄馨儿)
- Education: Chulalongkorn University
- Occupations: Singer; actress
- Years active: 2021–present
- Agents: LOMABin (2021); GMMTV (2024–present)
- Known for: Dao in My Magic Prophecy; Ploy in Wu
- Height: 1.60 m (5 ft 3 in)
- Musical career
- Genre: Thai Pop
- Instrument: Vocals
- Years active: 2024–present
- Label: Riser Music
- Member of: Felizz

Chompoopuntip Temtanamongkol (Thai: ชมพูพันธุ์ทิพย์ เต็มธนมงคล; born 3 April 2007), nicknamed Acare (Thai: เอแคร์), also known by the Chinese name Huang Xiner (Chinese: 黄馨儿) and formerly known as Eclair (Thai: เอแคลร์), is a Thai singer and actress. She is a member of the T-Pop girl group Felizz under Riser Music. She is known for her roles in My Magic Prophecy (2025) and Wu (2026), as well as for competing on the Chinese-Thai reality survival show Chuang Asia: Thailand, where she finished in 28th place out of 70 contestants.

== Early life and education ==
Chompoopuntip was born on 3 April 2007 in Bangkok, Thailand. After completing her secondary education at Patumwan Demonstration School, she enrolled at Chulalongkorn University, where she is currently studying International Communication Management at the Faculty of Communication Arts.

== Career ==
=== 2021–2024: Pre-debut, Chuang Asia: Thailand and GMMTV ===
On 19 July 2021, Chompoopuntip was introduced as a member of LOMABin's upcoming girl duo ACARE n BELOVED. However, the duo ended up quietly disbanding that same year. In late 2023, she entered the Chinese-Thai reality survival show Chuang Asia: Thailand, which aired in 2024, competing alongside future fellow Riser Rookies members Krongkwan Nakornthap (Jaoying) and Nutnicha Sangmanee (Pream). She was eliminated in the third round, finishing in 28th place out of 70 contestants.

=== 2024–present: Debut with Felizz and Be Mine ===
On 26 November 2024, during the "GMMTV 2025: Riding the Wave" event, it was revealed that Riser Music had started training a new girl group named Riser Rookies. During this period, Chompoopuntip and the other members performed dance covers of tracks by fellow Riser Music artists with original choreography to build their fanbase and showcase their skills. On 16 May 2025, the group's official name was revealed as Felizz and they debuted on 23 May 2025 with the digital single "See Through".

On 3 November 2026, during the "GMMTV NEXT: Generation Happy" event, it was revealed that Chompoopuntip was cast alongside fellow Felizz member Sillapintr Sillapachai (Sangt) for the upcoming girls' love series Be Mine.

== Discography ==
=== Singles ===
==== Digital Singles ====
===== Collaborations =====
Year	Title	Notes
2024	"Summer Dream" (with the contestants of Chuang Asia: Thailand)	Theme song for Chuang Asia: Thailand

== Filmography ==
=== Film ===
Year	Title	Role	Notes
2019	Frozen 2	Elsa (young)	Voice role, Thai version
2021	Luca	Giulia Marcovaldo	Voice role, Thai version

=== Television series ===
Key
†	Denotes television productions that have not yet been released

Year	Title	Role	Network	Notes	Ref.
2018	Girl from Nowhere	Tang	Netflix	Supporting role	
2019	Wolf	Mariko	One 31	Guest role	
2021	I Need Romance	Jubjang (young)	TrueID	Guest role	
2025	Ossan's Love Thailand	Baimon Nuntacharoensakul	GMM 25	Guest role	
2025	My Magic Prophecy	"Dao" Thordao Kittiphokhin	GMM 25	Supporting role	
2025	MuTeLuv: "Hi" by My Luck	"Mangpor" Natcha Jettanakan	GMM 25	Supporting role	
2026	Wu	Ploy Phruetchaianan	GMM 25	Supporting role	
TBA	Surf 'n' Love †	Tonnam	TBA	Supporting role	
TBA	Our Lyrics †	TBA	TBA	Supporting role	
TBA	Be Mine: Be My Boo †	Jaokha	TBA	Main role	

=== Music video appearances ===
Year	Title	Artist	Label	Ref.
2026	"ความคิดถึงที่ไม่จำเป็น (Friend Zone)"	Krist Perawat feat. Nanon Korapat	Riser Music	

== Fan meetings ==
Title	Date	Venue	Notes	Ref.
My Magic Prophecy: Let the Magic Begin	27 July 2025	Siam Pavalai Royal Grand Theatre	With My Magic Prophecy cast	
My Magic Prophecy Lucky in Love Fan Party	28 September 2025	MCC Hall, The Mall Lifestore Bangkapi	With My Magic Prophecy cast	
My Magic Prophecy Lucky in Love After Party	29 September 2025	MCC Hall, The Mall Lifestore Bangkapi	With My Magic Prophecy cast	
Wu Destiny After Party	1 July 2026	MCC Hall, The Mall Lifestore Bangkapi	With Wu cast	
GMMTV International Novel Festival 2026	24 July 2026	Samyan Mitrtown, 5th Fl.	With Felizz	
GMMTV Fanival: Happy Family	7 October 2026	Union Hall, Union Mall	With Felizz	

== Concerts ==
Title	Date	Venue	Notes	Ref.
JimmySea Dreamscape Fancon	30 November 2025	Union Hall, Union Mall	With Jimmy, Sea, Nut, Godji, Pompam, Jennie, Golf	
