= JASP.ER =

Thai boy band

JASP.ER เจสเป.อร์
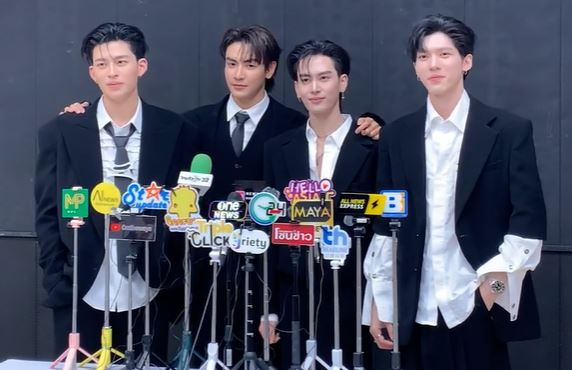
- JASP.ER in April 2025; Left to Right: Pond, Joong, Santa, and Aou

Background information
- Origin: Bangkok, Thailand
- Genre: T-pop
- Years active: 2024–present
- Label: Riser Music
- Members: Joong; Aou; Santa; Pond
- Website: gmm-tv.com

JASP.ER（Thai: เจสเป.อร์), is the second Thai boy band launched by Riser Music. All members are actors under GMMTV. The group consists of four members: Joong, Aou, Santa, and Pond. They debuted on December 19, 2024, with the single "แรงอีกนิด (SADISTIC)".

== Name ==
The name holds a special meaning: it comes from the word "Jasper", which symbolizes "the gem of perseverance and strength." Additionally, the letters J, A, S, and P in the group name correspond to the first letters of the four members' English names, with "ER" added at the end to form a complete word.

== History ==
=== 2024–2025: Pre-debut activities and debut ===
The group was first introduced on December 13, 2024, by Riser Music, a record label under the Thai entertainment company GMMTV. Initially launched as a project unit under the name Project JASP.ER, the lineup consisted of four established actors from the agency and released its first single, "Sadistic" on December 19. Prior to their formal introduction, members Pond and Joong had already showcased their musical capabilities through a collaborative project titled "Charm" (ฉลามชอบงับคุณ) with fellow labelmates LYKN earlier that year. Furthermore, the members made a special appearance as guest performers at LYKN's first major solo concert, LYKN Unleashed Concert, cementing their bond before their official group debut.

On March 31, 2025, before releasing its second single, RISER MUSIC announced that it would remove "Project" from the group name and change its name to "JASP.ER". Their second digital single, "Take It Off" (ถอด), was released on April 4. In July, the quartet made their first overseas appearance by performing at the GMMTV MUSICON IN JAPAN 2025 festival. On December 4, they released their third digital single, titled "TOUCH".

=== 2026–present: First solo concert ===
On May 8, 2026, JASP.ER continued their periodic releases with their fourth digital single, "Love Scene". In July of the same year, the group officially introduced FLAREY, the animated mascot for their fan club. Their fifth single, "Wish", was published on August 19. In October 2026, the band embarked on an official press tour to promote their upcoming first large-scale solo concert, titled JASP.ER TEMPTATION CONCERT, scheduled to take place on December 19 and 20 at the Impact Arena.

== Members ==
- Aou (Thai: อู๋) – leader, lead vocalist
- Pond (Thai: ปอนด์) – main rapper
- Joong (Thai: จุง) – main vocalist
- Santa (Thai: แซนต้า) – main dancer

== Discography ==
=== Collaborations ===
Year	Title	Member(s)	Label	Notes	Ref.
2024	"ฉ่ำ (Charm)"	Joong, Pond	Riser Music	LYKN 4th Single	

=== Singles ===
Year	Title	Label	Notes	Ref.
2024	"แรงอีกนิด (Sadistic)"	Riser Music	Non-album single	
2025	"ถอด (Take It Off)"	Riser Music	Non-album single	
2025	"Touch"	Riser Music	Non-album single	
2026	"Love Scene"	Riser Music	Non-album single	
2026	"Wish"	Riser Music	Non-album single	
2026	"Please"	Riser Music	Non-album single	

=== Online shows ===
Year	Title	Notes	Ref.
2024–present	JASP.ER BEHIND THE SCENES	Behind-the-scenes footage from JASP.ER's music videos and activities	
2025–present	JASP.ER BEHIND THE SONG	Behind-the-scenes footage from JASP.ER's recording session	

== Live Performances ==
=== Solo concerts ===
Year	Date	Tittle	Venue	Ref.
2026	18-20 December	JASP.ER Temptation Concert	Impact Arena	

=== Concert Participants ===
Year	Title	Date	Artist	Venue	Ref.
2024	December 21	GMMTV Starlympics 2024	GMMTV Artists	Impact Arena	
2025	July 26-27	GMMTV Musicon 2025: Tokyo	Krist, Gawin, Satang, Keen, Barcode, LYKN, JASP.ER	Toyosu Pit	
2025	December 20	GMMTV Starlympics 2025	GMMTV Artists	Impact Arena	
2026	February 13-15	Riser Concert: The First Rise	Krist, Nanon, Win, Fourth, Gemini, Phuwin, Perth, LYKN, JASP.ER, Felizz, Clo'ver	Impact Arena	
2026	May 31-31	GMMTV Musicon 2026: Singapore	Krist, Nanon, Gawin, LYKN, JASP.ER, Felizz, Clo'ver	Singapore Expo	
2026	November 28	GMMTV Starlympics 2024	GMMTV Artists	Impact Arena	

=== Guest Appearance ===
Year	Date	Title	Headline Artist	Venue	Notes	Ref.
2024	September 21	LYKN Unleashed Concert	LYKN	Thunder Dome, Muang Thong Thani	Joong and Pond appeared as guest performers to debut their collaboration single with LYKN, "Charm" prior to JASP.ER's official formation.	
2025	May 17-18	Love Out Loud Fan Fest 2025: Lovemosphere	Earth, Mix, Boun, Prem, Pond, Phuwin, Force, Book, Joong, Dunk, Jimmy, Sea, First, Khaotung, Gemini, Fourth, Perth, Santa, William, Est, Winny, Satang	Impact Arena, Muang Thong Thani	Joong, Pond, and Santa performed as part of the main headlining lineup; Aou appeared as a guest to join them on stage for a special performance as a full group unit.	
2026	August 21-23	PondPhuwin Space Soul-dyssey Concert	Pond Naravit, Phuwin Tangsakyuen	Impact Arena, Muang Thong Thani	Santa appeared as a fixed guest across all days; Joong and Aou joined on Day 2 and Day 3, with all four members performing together as JASP.ER.	
2026	October 16-18	Oh My Fourth Concert	Nattawat Jirochtikul	BITEC LIVE	Joong appeared as a guest performer on October 17 (Day 2), officially representing the group on stage.	

=== Music Festivals ===
Year	Title	Venue	Ref.
2025	ICONSIAM Thaiconic Songkran Festival 2025	River Park, ICONSIAM	
2025	BIG MOUNTAIN MUSIC FESTIVAL 15	The Ocean Khao Yai, Thailand	
2026	SUPERFLUID Presented by KING POWER RANGNAM	King Power Rangnam	
2026	GOTCHAPOP CONCERT 4	Exhibition Hall 3-4, Queen Sirikit National Convention Center	
2026	The A Festival	Paris Event Center, Paris	
2026	PHAYAO ORIGINS: THE FIRST LIGHT OF 2027	King Ngam Mueang Monument, Phayao Province	

== Awards and nominations ==
Year	Award	Category	Nominated work	Result	Ref.
2025	Komchadleuk Awards	Best Thai Pop Music: Best New Artist	แรงอีกนิด (SADISTIC)	Nominated	
2025	Kazz Awards 2025	Rookie Artist Award	แรงอีกนิด (SADISTIC)	Won	
2025	30th Asian Television Awards	Best Music Video	แรงอีกนิด (SADISTIC)	Nominated	
2026	TOTY MUSIC AWARD 2025	Popular Male Group of the year	ถอด (TAKE IT OFF)	Nominated	
