= Chayatorn Trairattanapradit =

Thai singer, songwriter, record producer, and actor (born 2004)

- ชยธร ไตรรัตนประดิษฐ์
- Chayatorn in June 2025
- Born: 24 March 2004 (age 22)
- Other name: Tui (ตุ้ย)
- Education: Srinakharinwirot University
- Occupations: Singer; songwriter; record producer; actor
- Years active: 2023–present
- Agent: GMMTV
- Notable work: Pepper in ThamePo: Heart That Skips a Beat; Beer in A Dog and a Plane
- Height: 1.75 m (5 ft 9 in)
- Musical career
- Genre: T-pop
- Instrument: Vocals
- Label: Riser Music
- Member of: LYKN

Chayatorn Trairattanapradit (Thai: ชยธร ไตรรัตนประดิษฐ์; born 24 March 2004), nicknamed Tui (Thai: ตุ้ย), is a Thai singer, songwriter, record producer, and actor. He is a member of the Thai boy band LYKN under Riser Music, formed through the GMMTV survival reality show Project Alpha (2022). Beyond his work in music, he is known for portraying Pepper in ThamePo: Heart That Skips a Beat (2024) and Beer in A Dog and a Plane (2026).

== Early life and education ==
Chayatorn was born on 24 March 2004 and grew up in Bangkok, Thailand, as the only child of former snooker player Tai Pichit. He began vocal and dance training at a young age while learning to beatbox and play the drums, piano, and guitar. He was later inspired by the South Korean boy band Got7 to pursue a career in music. He completed his secondary education at Srinakharinwirot University Prasarnmit Demonstration School. After initially studying broadcasting at Bangkok University's School of Communication Arts for two years, he transferred to Srinakharinwirot University's College of Social Communication Innovation (COSCI), majoring in acting and directing for cinema.

== Career ==
=== 2022–2023: Pre-debut and Project Alpha ===
In 2022, Chayatorn joined GMMTV's reality competition show Project Alpha after a suggestion from his vocal coach. Throughout the competition, which aired from December 2022 to March 2023, he initially competed in the lower-tier "Beta" team before advancing to the top-ranking "Alpha" group after winning a challenge stage with a vocal and beatboxing performance of "Very Very Small". In the finale, he placed third overall, securing his spot as a member of the Thai boy band LYKN.

=== 2023–present: Debut with LYKN and acting career ===
Chayatorn officially debuted as a member of LYKN under Riser Music, alongside William, Lego, Nut, and Hong, with the release of their digital single "เลิกกับเขาเดี๋ยวเหงาเป็นเพื่อน (May I?)" on 5 May 2023. Beginning in 2024, he expanded into music production, working as a lyricist, melody writer, vocal director, and producer. His songwriting and production credits for LYKN include the singles "Charm", "SUGOI", and "LYKYOU" (2024), co-writing the rap lyrics for "First Sight", and co-producing and co-writing their 2026 ballad "If Only". Outside of the group, he contributed as an assistant writer and backing vocalist on Win Metawin's single "Night Ride".

Chayatorn also recorded the solo soundtrack "From Now On" for the 2024 television series Kidnap. Later that year, he made his television acting debut as Pepper, a member of the fictional boy group MARS, in GMMTV's musical drama ThamePo: Heart That Skips a Beat, also contributing the solo track "Destined" to its soundtrack.

In 2025, he launched his independent clothing brand, morthings. In 2026, he portrayed Beer in A Dog and a Plane, for which he also sang a soundtrack single. On 16 August 2026, he released his debut solo digital single "ปล่อยใจ (Bloom)" under Riser Music, which he co-produced alongside his father. A pop R&B track inspired by the music of Got7's Jay B, it features a concept, lyrics, and melody that he developed himself. He was subsequently cast in upcoming television dramas, including Our Lyrics and Starscope.

== Discography ==
=== Singles ===
==== As lead artist ====
Year	Title	Label	Ref.
2026	"ปล่อยใจ" (Bloom)	Riser Music	

==== Soundtrack appearances ====
Year	Title	Soundtrack	Label	Ref.
2024	"แค่จากนี้ไปเราไม่ปล่อยมือ (From Now On)"	Kidnap OST	GMMTV Records	
2024	"ไม่ใช่บังเอิญ (Destined)"	ThamePo: Heart That Skips a Beat OST	GMMTV Records	
2026	"โดยสวัสดิภาพ (Good Flight)"	A Dog and a Plane OST	GMMTV Records	

== Filmography ==
Key
†	Denotes television productions that have not yet been released

=== Television series ===
Year	Title	Role	Notes	Ref.
2024	ThamePo: Heart That Skips a Beat	"Pepper" Pavee Warisphol	Main role	
2026	A Dog and a Plane	"Beer" Thirawat Chaemthai	Supporting role	
TBA	Our Lyrics †	Hope	Supporting role	
TBA	Starscope †	Pho	Supporting role	

=== Film ===
Year	Title	Role	Notes	Ref.
2023	No Worries	Himself	Short film for LYKN's third single of the same name	

=== Television shows ===
Year	Title	Network	Notes
2022–2023	Project Alpha	GMM 25	Contestant; Finished 3rd (Alpha)
2025	Idol Energy	GMMTV YouTube channel	Regular member
2026	Idol Energy Season 2	GMMTV YouTube channel	Regular member

=== Hosting ===
Year	Title	Role	Note(s)	Ref.
2025	Thailand Music Countdown	Special MC	With Krittin (PERSES); 4 episodes	

== Concerts and fan meetings ==
Title	Date	Venue	Notes	Ref.
Kidnap Final EP. Fan Meeting	22 November 2024	SF World Cinema, CentralWorld	Guest artist	
ThamePo: The First Beat	13 December 2024	SF World Cinema, CentralWorld	With ThamePo cast	
ThamePo: Our Last Beat Fan Party	7 March 2025	MCC Hall, The Mall Lifestore Bankapi	With ThamePo cast	
Love Out Loud Fan Fest 2025: Lovemosphere	17–18 May 2025	Impact Arena	Guest artist	
A Dog and a Plane Final EP. Fan Meeting	31 July 2026	Centralworld Pulse Hall, Centralworld	With A Dog and a Plane cast	
Milk Love Whimsical House Fancon	15 November 2026	Union Hall, Union Mall	Guest artist	

== Awards and nominations ==
Year	Award	Category	Work	Result	Ref.
2024	HUB Awards 2024	OST of The Year	"แค่จากนี้ไปเราไม่ปล่อยมือ (From Now On)"	Won	
