= Pichetpong Chiradatesakunvong =

Thai-Chinese singer, rapper, dancer, songwriter, and actor (born 2003)

- พิเชฐพงศ์ จิรเดชสกุลวงศ์
- Pichetpong in September 2026
- Born: 16 October 2003 (age 23)
- Other names: Hong (ฮง), Hongshi (Thai: ฮงชิ)
- Education: Chulalongkorn University
- Occupations: Singer; rapper; dancer; songwriter; actor
- Years active: 2023–present
- Agent: GMMTV
- Notable work: Dylan in ThamePo: Heart That Skips a Beat
- Height: 1.78 m (5 ft 10 in)
- Musical career
- Genre: T-pop
- Instrument: Vocals
- Label: Riser Music
- Member of: LYKN

Pichetpong Chiradatesakunvong (Thai: พิเชฐพงศ์ จิรเดชสกุลวงศ์; born 16 October 2003), known professionally as Hongshi (Thai: ฮงชิ) or by his nickname Hong (Thai: ฮง), is a Thai-Chinese singer, rapper, dancer, songwriter, and actor. He is the main rapper of the Thai boy band LYKN, a group managed by Riser Music and formed through GMMTV's survival reality show Project Alpha (2022). In addition to his musical career, he is recognized for portraying Dylan Zhou in the television series ThamePo: Heart That Skips a Beat (2024).

== Early life and education ==
Pichetpong was born on 16 October 2003 and grew up in Bangkok, Thailand. He is the elder of two sons in a Thai-Chinese family whose family has roots in the Isan region. He completed his secondary education at Suankularb Wittayalai School, where he played football and served as a school cheerleader for Jaturamitr Samakkee, a traditional football tournament of boys' schools in Thailand. He later attended Chulalongkorn University, enrolling in the Bachelor of Arts and Science in Integrated Innovation (BAScii) international program.

== Career ==
=== 2020–2023: Pre-debut and Project Alpha ===
Pichetpong began performing in the eighth grade as a member of the K-pop cover group TNT, participating in several local dance competitions. In late 2022, he auditioned for GMMTV's reality competition show Project Alpha after being scouted through mutual school connections. Having initially trained primarily in dance, he shifted his focus to rapping throughout the competition, which aired from December 2022 to March 2023. He finished the show in fourth place, securing a position as a member and main rapper of the Thai boy band LYKN.

=== 2023–present: Debut with LYKN and acting career ===
Pichetpong debuted as a member of LYKN, alongside William, Lego, Nut, and Tui, with the release of their digital single "เลิกกับเขาเดี๋ยวเหงาเป็นเพื่อน (May I?)" on 5 May 2023. In 2024, he began contributing to songwriting under his moniker Hongshi, serving as an assistant writer for LYKN's single "Sugoi" and co-writing the rap lyrics for "Trick or Treat". Later that year, he made his television debut starring as Dylan Zhou, the main rapper of a fictional boy group named MARS, in the television series ThamePo: Heart That Skips a Beat (2024). He continued his songwriting activities in 2025 by co-writing the rap lyrics for the group's single "First Sight". On 7 April 2026, he released his debut solo digital single "ถูกสเปก (Let's Go)" under Riser Music, which he wrote and composed. In October 2026, he expanded into entrepreneurship by launching his independent clothing brand, REDRICE. He was subsequently cast in upcoming drama series, securing a supporting role as Night in Twenty One and a lead role as Max in I Wanna Hold Your Hand.

== Discography ==
=== Singles ===
==== As lead artist ====
Year	Title	Label	Ref.
2026	"ถูกสเปก" (Let's Go)	Riser Music	

== Filmography ==
Key
†	Denotes television productions that have not yet been released

=== Television series ===
Year	Title	Role	Notes	Ref.
2024	ThamePo: Heart That Skips a Beat	Dylan Zhou	Main role	
TBA	Twenty One †	Night	Supporting role	
TBA	I Wanna Hold Your Hand †	Max	Main role	

=== Film ===
Year	Title	Role	Notes	Ref.
2023	No Worries	Himself	Short film for LYKN's third single of the same name	

=== Television shows ===
Year	Title	Network	Notes
2022–2023	Project Alpha	GMM 25	Contestant; Finished 4th (Alpha)
2025	Idol Energy	GMMTV YouTube channel	Regular member
2026	Idol Energy Season 2	GMMTV YouTube channel	Regular member

=== Music video appearances ===
Year	Title	Artist	Ref.
2021	"บอกหน่อย" (Tell Me You're Not Dead)	Mercury Goldfish	
2022	"กับฉันในความฝัน"	neofolk feat. Sachalalaba	

== Concerts and fan meetings ==
Title	Date	Venue	Notes	Ref.
ThamePo: The First Beat	13 December 2024	SF World Cinema, CentralWorld	With ThamePo cast	
ThamePo: Our Last Beat Fan Party	7 March 2025	MCC Hall, The Mall Lifestore Bankapi	With ThamePo cast	
Sky-Nani Frienomenon Fancon	15 February 2025	Union Hall, Union Mall	Guest artist	
Love Out Loud Fan Fest 2025: Lovemosphere	17–18 May 2025	Impact Arena	Guest artist	
William Est WE Magnetic Fancon	9–10 August 2025	Union Hall, Union Mall	Guest artist	
Milk Love Whimsical House Fancon	15 November 2026	Union Hall, Union Mall	Guest artist	
