= Charisar Oldham =

Thai-British singer and actress (born 2002)

- ชาริสา โอแฮม
- Born: 4 October 2002 (age 24)
- Other names: Chari (ชาริ), Lisa (ลิซ่า)
- Education: Srinakharinwirot University
- Occupations: Singer; actress
- Years active: 2009–present
- Agents: 4NOLOGUE (2020–2024); GMMTV (2024–present)
- Height: 1.6 m (5 ft 3 in)
- Musical career
- Genre: T-Pop
- Instrument: Vocals
- Years active: 2023–present
- Labels: 4NOLOGUE; Riser Music
- Member of: Felizz
- Formerly of: bXd

Charisar Oldham (Thai: ชาริสา โอแฮม; born 4 October 2002), nicknamed Chari (Thai: ชาริ) and formerly known as Lisa (Thai: ลิซ่า), is a Thai-British singer and actress. She is the main vocalist of the T-Pop girl group Felizz under Riser Music, and a former member of bXd under 4NOLOGUE. She is also known for her child acting roles in Raeng Ngao (2012) and Raeng Ngao 2 (2019).

== Early life and education ==
Charisar was born on 4 October 2002. After graduating from Sarasas Witaed Suvarnabhumi School, she pursued a bachelor's degree in Cinema and Digital Media, majoring in acting and directing, at Srinakharinwirot University's College of Social Communication Innovation. She graduated with honours on 15 January 2026.

== Career ==
=== 2009–2019: Child acting career ===
Charisar entered the entertainment industry as a child actress, first appearing in a guest role as young Jomkhwan in the 2009 television drama Plerng See Roong. She also appeared in dramas such as Thepphabut Maya Thepthida Jamlaeng (2010) and Saeb Jiew Puan Hua Jai (2012) before receiving wider recognition for portraying Tom in Raeng Ngao (2012), a role she reprised in the 2019 sequel, Raeng Ngao 2.

=== 2022–2024: 4NOLOGUE and bXd ===
Prior to her music debut, Charisar appeared in television commercials and participated in talent competitions. At OCTOPOP 2022, she was introduced as a member of bXd (Born Never Die), a new Thai pop girl group under 4NOLOGUE, where she was promoted under the epithet "Black-Eyed Susan". The group debuted on 27 January 2023 with the single "Just Dance". Her activities with the group concluded on 29 February 2024, when 4NOLOGUE announced the termination of all its artist contracts.

=== 2024–present: Debut with Felizz and acting roles ===
In late 2024, Charisar signed with GMMTV, making her first appearance under the agency as the female lead in the music video for Tanapon Sukumpantanasan's single "Secret", released in October 2024.

On 26 November 2024, during the "GMMTV 2025: Riding the Wave" event, it was revealed that Riser Music had started training a new girl group named Riser Rookies. During this period, Charisar and the other members performed dance covers of tracks by fellow Riser Music artists with original choreography to build their fanbase and showcase their skills. On 16 May 2025, the group's official name was revealed as Felizz, and they debuted on 23 May 2025 with the digital single "See Through".

Alongside her music activities, Charisar resumed her acting career in 2025 with roles as the young Margaret "Plaifun" Heng in the film Diva, la Vie and Princess Kate of Arantha in the series That Summer. She was also cast in upcoming GMMTV series, including Wish upon a Star, Ditto, and Pie and the 7 Witches, as well as a supporting role as Phapie in Love's Echoes.

== Personal life ==
In June 2023, Charisar attended the Bangkok Pride festival alongside her fellow members of bXd.

== Discography ==
=== bXd singles ===
Year	Title	Label	Ref.
2023	"Just Dance"	4NOLOGUE	
2023	"Don't Wanna Miss You"	4NOLOGUE	
2024	"Perfect Match"	4NOLOGUE	

== Filmography ==
=== Film ===
Year	Title	Role	Notes
2025	Diva, la Vie	"Plaifun" Margaret Heng (young)	Guest role

=== Television series ===
Key
†	Denotes television productions that have not yet been released

Year	Title	Role	Notes	Ref.
2009	Plerng See Roong	Jomkhwan (young)	Guest role	
2010	Thepphabut Maya Thepthida Jamlaeng	Matmai (young)	Guest role	
2012	Saeb Jiew Puan Hua Jai	Melody	Guest role	
2012	Raeng Ngao	Tom	Supporting role	
2019	Raeng Ngao 2	Tom	Supporting role	
2025	That Summer	Princess Kate of Arantha	Guest role	
TBA	Love's Echoes †	Phapie	Supporting role	
TBA	Ditto †	TBA	Supporting role	
TBA	Wish upon a Star †	Sandy	Supporting role	
TBA	Pie and the 7 Witches †	Michelle	Supporting role	

=== Music video appearances ===
Year	Title	Artist	Ref.
2024	"Secret"	Perth Tanapon	
2026	"ความคิดถึงที่ไม่จำเป็น (Friend Zone)"	Krist Perawat (feat. Nanon Korapat)	
2026	"ไม่ไหวแล้ว (Officially)"	Fourth Nattawat (feat. Jaokhun)	

== Fanmeetings ==
Title	Date	Venue	Notes	Ref.
GMMTV International Novel Festival 2026	July 24, 2026	Samyan Mitrtown, 5th Fl.	With Felizz	
GMMTV Fanival: Happy Family	October 7, 2026	Union Hall, Union Mall	With Felizz	

== Concerts ==
Title	Date	Venue	Notes	Ref.
Octopop 2022	October 15, 2022	Rajamangala Stadium	With bXd	
Siam Music Fest 2022	December 18, 2022	Siam Square	With bXd	
Summer-Cation Malliday	March 10–12, 2023	Central World	With bXd	
Songkran 2023 by SUPERFLUID	April 14–16, 2023	Central World	With bXd	
