= Project Alpha (TV program) =

2022 Thai reality competition show

- Promotional poster
- Thai: โปรเจกต์ อัลฟ่า
- Genre: Reality competition
- Presented by: Pitipat Kootrakul
- Starring: Saksit Vejsupaporn; Nipaporn Thititanakarn; Apiwat Ueathavornsuk; Tanatat Chaiyaat; Worrawech Danuwong
- Music by: Ae Botcash
- Opening theme: "THE ALPHA" by Project Alpha
- Country of origin: Thailand
- Original language: Thai
- No. of episodes: 12

Production
- Executive producers: Sataporn Panichraksapong; Darapa Choeysanguan
- Producers: Keerati Supawa; Tanatat Chaiyaat; Phattarapon Poonpipat
- Running time: 68–120 minutes
- Production company: GMMTV

Original release
- Network: GMM25; YouTube
- Release: December 4, 2022 – March 5, 2023

Related
- Project Alpha New Clan (2026)

Project Alpha (Thai: โปรเจกต์ อัลฟ่า; stylised in all caps) is a 2022 Thai reality competition show produced by GMMTV. It premiered on GMM25 and the show's YouTube channel on December 4, 2022, and aired on Sundays at 20:30 ICT.

Twenty eight contestants were selected for the show and were split into two categories in the first episode; Alpha and Beta. The show finale was broadcast live on March 5, 2023, with the announcement of the final lineup who would debut as LYKN.

== Concept and format ==
Project Alpha features an Alpha and Beta hierarchical framework, in which the four contestants with the best performances in the first episode are classified as Alpha, while the remaining contestants enter the Beta category.

At the start of the show, all participants are divided into four groups. The top performer in each group will be chosen as Alpha based on votes from the judges and the group members, with the condition that contestants cannot vote for themselves. Once Alpha and Beta have been determined, the four Alphas are assigned to the same group, while the Beta group will be split up into four groups to participate in the subsequent performance mission based on the pre-established topic and song. Audience voting begins throughout the performance preparation time.

Following each group's performance, the judges will select the best Beta group, and from that group, the best Beta performer (Best Beta) will be selected. The Best Beta will be given the option to challenge one of the Alphas in an attempt to win the throne, and the Alpha with the fewest votes will be obliged to engage in the battle. Two of the three contestants then will be chosen to become Alphas. The fate of the remaining Beta contestants will also be decided by audience voting using the show's elimination mechanism.

In the final episode, the scoring method changes, with the eight remaining Beta participants separated into two teams to compete against each other using a knockout format determined by the judges. The victorious team is immediately named the Best Beta, allowing them to fight against four Alpha entrants. Although the performance is performed in a group, the evaluation is thereafter done individually. Judges' evaluations make up half of the performance evaluation ratio, followed by guest judges' evaluations at 40% and audience votes at 10%.

== Contestants ==
Project Alpha was initially set to feature 28 participants. However, soon before the show began, one of the contestants (Fiat) withdrew for health reasons.

Color key:

Final members of LYKN
Eliminated in the final episode
Eliminated in the fourth elimination round
Eliminated in the third elimination round
Eliminated in the second elimination round
Eliminated in the first elimination round
Left the show

28 contestants
Jakrapatr Kaewpanpong (William / วิลเลี่ยม)	Rapeepong Supatineekitdecha (Lego / เลโก้)	Chayatorn Trairattanapradit (Tui / ตุ้ย)	Pichetpong Chiradatesakunvong (Hong / ฮง)
Thanat Danjesda (Nut / นัท)	Vendelbo Jakobsen (Nicky / นิกกี้)	Suvijak Piyanopharoj (Keen / คีน)	Wongphat Jiemvijid (Deaw / เดียว)
Nattanon Tongsaeng (Fluke / ฟลุ๊ค)	Ochiris Suwanacheep (Aungpao / อังเปา)	Phassapong Boonvittayakul (Time / ไทม์)	Intouch Chaipisittikul (Champ / แชมป์)
Nitiphas Wiriyakunaporn (Music / มิวสิค)	Chaiyatouch Suralertrungson (PeemPeem / ภีมภีม)	Parintorn Pirom (Phat / ภัทร)	Sorranan Suksawat (Otto / อ๊อตโต้)
Peerakan Teawsuwan (Ashi / อชิ)	Kridchayaan Attavipach (Prom / พร้อม)	Sruj Kawekit p-nit (Kop / คอป)	Suphakorn Jariyanantakul (Korn / กร)
Natthapong Thonguthaisiri (Kenji / เคนจิ)	Tanapon Hathaidachadusadee (Kade / เขตต์)	Ganokpon Phakphien (Bigger / บิ๊กเกอร์)	Pongpak Pimsarn (Boss / บอส)
Kiratikarn Boonchu (Karn / กานต์)	Patiphat Suwannatrai (Eark / เอิร์ก)	Pakkawat Prasomsil (NewEarth / นิวเอิร์ธ)	Natthakorn Na Ayuthaya (Fiat / เฟี๊ยต)

== Missions ==
=== Week 1: Searching for ALPHA ===
In this round, the 27 contestants will be divided into four groups to perform individually in front of the judges and other contestants in their group. The judges and contestants later will vote to determine the Alpha, and contestants will be unable to vote for themselves.

Color key

- ALPHA
- BETA

Searching for ALPHA
Group	Contestant ID	Contestant	Song	Original Artist	Results
BETA Group 1	A24	Kridchayaan Attavipach (Prom)	ห้ามทิ้ง	Atom Chanakan	BETA
BETA Group 1	A19	Vendelbo Jakobsen (Nicky)	So Hot	Luke Ishikawa	BETA
BETA Group 1	A11	Kiratikarn Boonchu (Karn)	ดวงเดือน	Joey Phuwasit	BETA
BETA Group 1	A06	Wongphat Jiemvijid (Deaw)	จากคนรักเก่า	Aof Pongsak	BETA
BETA Group 1	A10	Tanapon Hathaidachadusadee (Kade)	โรคประจำตัว	Clash	BETA
BETA Group 1	A04	Pongpak Pimsarn (Boss)	อยู่ได้ได้อยู่ (ineednoone)	Tilly Birds	BETA
BETA Group 1	A27	Jakrapatr Kaewpanpong (William)	ถ้าเราเจอกันอีก (Until Then)	Tilly Birds	ALPHA
BETA Group 2	A26	Chayatorn Trairattanapradit (Tui)	แน่ใจไหม	Nont Tanont	BETA
BETA Group 2	A21	Sorranan Suksawat (Otto)	So What	Matcha Mosimann	BETA
BETA Group 2	A13	Natthapong Thonguthaisiri (Kenji)	L.O.V.E	X3 Super Gang	BETA
BETA Group 2	A25	Phassapong Boonvittayakul (Time)	อ้าว	Atom Chanakan	BETA
BETA Group 2	A03	Ganokpon Phakphien (Bigger)	ผมเป็นของคุณไปแล้ว	Bie Sukrit	BETA
BETA Group 2	A08	Nattanon Tongsaeng (Fluke)	แค่พี่น้อง (Status)	Tilly Birds	ALPHA
BETA Group 2	A23	Parintorn Pirom (Phat)	จังหวะหัวใจ	Bie Sukrit	BETA
BETA Group 3	A18	Pakkawat Prasomsil (NewEarth)	อยากได้อีกครั้ง	Chin Chinawut	BETA
BETA Group 3	A20	Thanat Danjesda (Nut)	คุณและคุณเท่านั้น	Kangsom Tanatat	ALPHA
BETA Group 3	A02	Ochiris Suwanacheep (Aungpao)	มองกี่ทีก็น่ารัก (Cute Cute)	Nanon Korapat	BETA
BETA Group 3	A12	Suvijak Piyanopharoj (Keen)	คนมันรัก	Ice Sarunyu	BETA
BETA Group 3	A15	Suphakorn Jariyanantakul (Korn)	ช่วงนี้ (Karma)	Atom Chanakan	BETA
BETA Group 3	A01	Peerakan Teawsuwan (Ashi)	อยากโดนเป็นเจ้าของ	Ice Sarunyu	BETA
BETA Group 3	A05	Intouch Chaipisittikul (Champ)	ซักกะนิด	Tata Young	BETA
BETA Group 4	A09	Pichetpong Chiradatesakunvong (Hong)	หมวยนี่คะ	China Dolls	BETA
BETA Group 4	A22	Chaiyatouch Suralertrungson (PeemPeem)	o.k.นะคะ	Katreeya English	BETA
BETA Group 4	A16	Rapeepong Supatineekitdecha (Lego)	อย่างนี้สิ (OUCH!)	Hi-U ft. Pmpeem, Jay, Jung	ALPHA
BETA Group 4	A17	Nitiphas Wiriyakunaporn (Music)	Wait a Minute	Bie Sukrit	BETA
BETA Group 4	A07	Patiphat Suwannatrai (Eark)	แฟนเธอ... (I Don't Like)	Pam Pamiga ft. Hi-U	BETA
BETA Group 4	A14	Sruj Kawekit p-nit (Kop)	จริงๆมันก็ดี (Drunk)	Gena Desouza	BETA

=== Week 2 & 3: Survival BETA – Viral Songs ===
The second week provides an overview of the training environment and preparation of the 27 contestants rather than a competition.

In the third week, the 23 Beta participants will be divided into four groups to compete, with each group assigned a "viral song." The best-performing group will be chosen, and the best Beta competitor from that group will be named the Best Beta. The Best Beta will then be able to choose an Alpha to compete for the Alpha title, while the Alpha with the fewest viewer votes will be compelled to compete. For the two groups that do not advance to the next round, the seven contestants who receive the fewest votes from viewers at home will be eliminated and removed from the competition. The Alpha group will also have to perform the assigned viral song, but it will not be judged.

Color key

- Best Group; qualified to the next round
- Best Beta
- Qualified to the next round
- Eliminated from the show
- Alpha

Viral Song Challenge
Group	Song	Original Artist	Contestant ID	Contestant
BETA V1	Money Honey	F.Hero x UrboyTJ ft. Minnie	A01	Ashi
BETA V1	Money Honey	F.Hero x UrboyTJ ft. Minnie	A02	Aungpao
BETA V1	Money Honey	F.Hero x UrboyTJ ft. Minnie	A05	Champ
BETA V1	Money Honey	F.Hero x UrboyTJ ft. Minnie	A09	Hong
BETA V1	Money Honey	F.Hero x UrboyTJ ft. Minnie	A25	Time
BETA V1	Money Honey	F.Hero x UrboyTJ ft. Minnie	A26	Tui
BETA V2	เพื่อนเล่น ไม่เล่นเพื่อน (Just Being Friendly)	Tilly Birds	A06	Deaw
BETA V2	เพื่อนเล่น ไม่เล่นเพื่อน (Just Being Friendly)	Tilly Birds	A12	Keen
BETA V2	เพื่อนเล่น ไม่เล่นเพื่อน (Just Being Friendly)	Tilly Birds	A14	Kop
BETA V2	เพื่อนเล่น ไม่เล่นเพื่อน (Just Being Friendly)	Tilly Birds	A15	Korn
BETA V2	เพื่อนเล่น ไม่เล่นเพื่อน (Just Being Friendly)	Tilly Birds	A19	Nicky
BETA V2	เพื่อนเล่น ไม่เล่นเพื่อน (Just Being Friendly)	Tilly Birds	A24	Prom
BETA V3	เกินต้าน (Too Cute)	PiXXiE		
BETA V3	เกินต้าน (Too Cute)	PiXXiE	A03	Bigger
BETA V3	เกินต้าน (Too Cute)	PiXXiE	A10	Kade
BETA V3	เกินต้าน (Too Cute)	PiXXiE	A11	Karn
BETA V3	เกินต้าน (Too Cute)	PiXXiE	A13	Kenji
BETA V3	เกินต้าน (Too Cute)	PiXXiE	A17	Music
BETA V3	เกินต้าน (Too Cute)	PiXXiE	A22	PeemPeem
BETA V4	ซูลูปาก้า ตาปาเฮ้	themoonwillalwaysbewithme		
BETA V4	ซูลูปาก้า ตาปาเฮ้	themoonwillalwaysbewithme	A04	Boss
BETA V4	ซูลูปาก้า ตาปาเฮ้	themoonwillalwaysbewithme	A07	Eark
BETA V4	ซูลูปาก้า ตาปาเฮ้	themoonwillalwaysbewithme	A18	NewEarth
BETA V4	ซูลูปาก้า ตาปาเฮ้	themoonwillalwaysbewithme	A21	Otto
BETA V4	ซูลูปาก้า ตาปาเฮ้	themoonwillalwaysbewithme	A23	Phat
ALPHA	ปล่อยจอย (Ploi Joy)	bamm	A08	Fluke
ALPHA	ปล่อยจอย (Ploi Joy)	bamm	A16	Lego
ALPHA	ปล่อยจอย (Ploi Joy)	bamm	A20	Nut
ALPHA	ปล่อยจอย (Ploi Joy)	bamm	A27	William

=== Week 4: 1st Challenge ALPHA ===
In this round, three contestants have to perform a full solo performance in order to compete for the Alpha seats. The contenders are:

- Best Beta, the best performer in the Survival BETA round, who earned the right to compete for the Alpha title.
- Alpha, who was chosen by Best Beta to compete for the Alpha position.
- Alpha, who receives the fewest votes from viewers at home that will be compelled to compete for the title of Alpha again.

Aside from the competition, there will be a special show featuring the top four contestants with the most votes.

1st Challenge ALPHA
Contestant ID	Song	Original Artist	Contestant	Position	Results
A08	โต๊ะริม (melt)	Nont Tanont	Fluke	ALPHA the fewest votes	Yes
A25	รักได้ป่าว	Gavin. D ft. Pui, Varinz, Nonny9, Z Trip, Miteennn	Time	BEST BETA	No
A20	อยากมีแฟนแล้ว	Lipta ft. Lazyloxy	Nut	ALPHA challengee	Yes
A26	แฟนเก่าคนโปรด (my fav ex)	Slapkiss	Tui	SPECIAL SHOW; Top 4 Most Votes	
A02	แฟนเก่าคนโปรด (my fav ex)	Slapkiss	Aungpao	SPECIAL SHOW; Top 4 Most Votes	
A05	แฟนเก่าคนโปรด (my fav ex)	Slapkiss	Champ	SPECIAL SHOW; Top 4 Most Votes	
A22	แฟนเก่าคนโปรด (my fav ex)	Slapkiss	PeemPeem	SPECIAL SHOW; Top 4 Most Votes	

=== Week 5: Survival BETA – Swag Songs ===
In this round, 16 Beta will be divided into four groups, with each group assigned a "swag song." Four contestants from bottom two groups who get the fewest votes from the viewers will be eliminated.

Color key

- Best Group; qualified to the next round
- Best Beta
- Qualified to the next round
- Eliminated from the show
- Alpha

Swag Song Challenge
Group	Song	Original Artist	Contestant ID	Contestant
BETA S1	แฟนใหม่หน้าคุ้น	Maiyarap ft. Milli	A02	Aungpao
BETA S1	แฟนใหม่หน้าคุ้น	Maiyarap ft. Milli	A06	Deaw
BETA S1	แฟนใหม่หน้าคุ้น	Maiyarap ft. Milli	A17	Music
BETA S1	แฟนใหม่หน้าคุ้น	Maiyarap ft. Milli	A23	Phat
BETA S2	หลอก	NICECNX		
BETA S2	หลอก	NICECNX	A01	Ashi
BETA S2	หลอก	NICECNX	A15	Korn
BETA S2	หลอก	NICECNX	A24	Prom
BETA S2	หลอก	NICECNX	A26	Tui
BETA S3	เสือสิ้นลาย	F.Hero Ft. P-Hot, YOUNGOHM, FYMME		
BETA S3	เสือสิ้นลาย	F.Hero Ft. P-Hot, YOUNGOHM, FYMME	A09	Hong
BETA S3	เสือสิ้นลาย	F.Hero Ft. P-Hot, YOUNGOHM, FYMME	A12	Keen
BETA S3	เสือสิ้นลาย	F.Hero Ft. P-Hot, YOUNGOHM, FYMME	A19	Nicky
BETA S3	เสือสิ้นลาย	F.Hero Ft. P-Hot, YOUNGOHM, FYMME	A25	Time
BETA S4	ทน	Sprite x Guygeegee		
BETA S4	ทน	Sprite x Guygeegee	A05	Champ
BETA S4	ทน	Sprite x Guygeegee	A14	Kop
BETA S4	ทน	Sprite x Guygeegee	A21	Otto
BETA S4	ทน	Sprite x Guygeegee	A22	PeemPeem
ALPHA	ทรงอย่างแบด (Bad Boy)	Paper Planes	A08	Fluke
ALPHA	ทรงอย่างแบด (Bad Boy)	Paper Planes	A16	Lego
ALPHA	ทรงอย่างแบด (Bad Boy)	Paper Planes	A20	Nut
ALPHA	ทรงอย่างแบด (Bad Boy)	Paper Planes	A27	William

Special Guests – GMMTV Artists:

- Tawinan Anukoolprasert (Sea)
- Pawat Chittsawangdee (Ohm)
- Trai Nimtawat (Neo)
- Weerayut Chansook (Arm)
- Tachakorn Boonlupyanun (Godji)

=== Week 6: 2nd Challenge ALPHA ===
Aside from the challenge, there is a special show from six contestants; two Alphas who did not participate in the challenge, two Betas with the highest votes, Beta selected by the judges, and Beta selected by the special guests from last week.

2nd Challenge ALPHA
Contestant ID	Song	Original Artist	Contestant	Position	Results
A08	ถ้าเธอรักฉันจริง	Three Man Down	Fluke	ALPHA the fewest votes	Yes
A09	Mirror Mirror	F.Hero x Milli ft. Changbin	Hong	BEST BETA	No
A16	ถามคำ (Question?)	UrboyTJ	Lego	ALPHA challengee	Yes
A20	ซ้อมมีแฟน (trial)	Kinkaworn x bamm	Nut	ALPHA didn't compete	SPECIAL SHOW
A27	ซ้อมมีแฟน (trial)	Kinkaworn x bamm	William	ALPHA didn't compete	SPECIAL SHOW
A21	ซ้อมมีแฟน (trial)	Kinkaworn x bamm	Otto	BETA top 2 most votes	SPECIAL SHOW
A22	ซ้อมมีแฟน (trial)	Kinkaworn x bamm	PeemPeem	BETA top 2 most votes	SPECIAL SHOW
A19	ซ้อมมีแฟน (trial)	Kinkaworn x bamm	Nicky	BETA selected by the judges	SPECIAL SHOW
A06	ซ้อมมีแฟน (trial)	Kinkaworn x bamm	Deaw	BETA selected by the guests	SPECIAL SHOW

Special Guests – GMMTV Artists:

- Jumpol Adulkittiporn (Off)
- Atthaphan Phunsawat (Gun)
- Kanaphan Puitrakul (First)
- Thanawat Rattanakitpaisan (Khaotung)
- Jennie Panhan

=== Week 7: Survival BETA – Joh Songs ===
In the seventh week, the remaining 12 Beta contestants are divided into three groups, with each group assigned a "joh song." Joh (Thai: โจ๊ะ) is a Thai slang term to describe the fun and excitement of an activity, especially at parties or gatherings with music and dancing. Three contestants from the bottom group who get the fewest votes will be eliminated.

Color key

- Best Group; qualified to the next round
- Best Beta
- Qualified to the next round
- Eliminated from the show
- Alpha

Joh Song Challenge
Group	Song	Original Artist	Contestant ID	Contestant
BETA J1	ชอบป่ะเนี่ย (Can I Call You Mine)	Mai Davika	A02	Aungpao
BETA J1	ชอบป่ะเนี่ย (Can I Call You Mine)	Mai Davika	A06	Deaw
BETA J1	ชอบป่ะเนี่ย (Can I Call You Mine)	Mai Davika	A09	Hong
BETA J1	ชอบป่ะเนี่ย (Can I Call You Mine)	Mai Davika	A12	Keen
BETA J2	แฟนผมน่ารัก (CUTE)	BOW MAYLADA feat. LIPTA		
BETA J2	แฟนผมน่ารัก (CUTE)	BOW MAYLADA feat. LIPTA	A21	Otto
BETA J2	แฟนผมน่ารัก (CUTE)	BOW MAYLADA feat. LIPTA	A22	PeemPeem
BETA J2	แฟนผมน่ารัก (CUTE)	BOW MAYLADA feat. LIPTA	A23	Phat
BETA J2	แฟนผมน่ารัก (CUTE)	BOW MAYLADA feat. LIPTA	A26	Tui
BETA J3	Fire Boy	PP Krit		
BETA J3	Fire Boy	PP Krit	A05	Champ
BETA J3	Fire Boy	PP Krit	A17	Music
BETA J3	Fire Boy	PP Krit	A19	Nicky
BETA J3	Fire Boy	PP Krit	A25	Time
ALPHA	Good Boy	KJ	A08	Fluke
ALPHA	Good Boy	KJ	A16	Lego
ALPHA	Good Boy	KJ	A20	Nut
ALPHA	Good Boy	KJ	A27	William

Special Guests – GMMTV Artists:

- Pirapat Watthanasetsiri (Earth)
- Sahaphap Wongratch (Mix)
- Tipnaree Weerawatnodom (Namtan)
- Naravit Lertratkosum (Pond)
- Phuwin Tangsakyuen

=== Week 8: 3rd Challenge ALPHA ===
Aside from the challenge, there is a special show from six contestants; two Alphas who did not participate in the challenge, two Betas with the highest votes, Beta selected by the judges, and Beta selected by the special guests from last week.

3rd Challenge ALPHA
Contestant ID	Song	Original Artist	Contestant	Position	Results
A20	Kryptonite	Pun	Nut	ALPHA the fewest votes	No
A19	Stand by หล่อ	New Country	Nicky	BEST BETA	Yes
A27	ลืมไปแล้วว่าลืมยังไง (Fade)	Jeff Satur	William	ALPHA challengee	Yes
A16	พูดไม่คิด	Season Five ft. F.Hero	Lego	ALPHA didn't compete	SPECIAL SHOW
A20	พูดไม่คิด	Season Five ft. F.Hero	Fluke	ALPHA didn't compete	SPECIAL SHOW
A26	พูดไม่คิด	Season Five ft. F.Hero	Tui	BETA top 2 most votes	SPECIAL SHOW
A05	พูดไม่คิด	Season Five ft. F.Hero	Champ	BETA top 2 most votes	SPECIAL SHOW
A12	พูดไม่คิด	Season Five ft. F.Hero	Keen	BETA selected by the judges	SPECIAL SHOW
A09	พูดไม่คิด	Season Five ft. F.Hero	Hong	BETA selected by the guests	SPECIAL SHOW

Special Guests – GMMTV Artists:

- Archen Aydin (Joong)
- Natachai Boonprasert (Dunk)
- Leo Saussay
- Chinnarat Siriphongchawalit (Mike)
- Ployshompoo Supasap (Jan)

=== Week 9: Survival BETA – Mashup Songs ===
In the final round of the Survival BETA, the remaining 9 Beta contestants are divided into three groups, with each group assigned a "mashup song." A contestant from the bottom group who get the fewest votes will be eliminated.

Color key

- Best Group; qualified to the next round
- Best Beta
- Qualified to the next round
- Eliminated from the show
- Alpha

Mashup Song Challenge
Group	Song	Original Artist	Contestant ID	Contestant
BETA M1	มูเตลู (Mutelu) - ฉันจะฉาปเธอ (Curse)	PiXXiE - bamm		
BETA M1	มูเตลู (Mutelu) - ฉันจะฉาปเธอ (Curse)	PiXXiE - bamm	A02	Aungpao
BETA M1	มูเตลู (Mutelu) - ฉันจะฉาปเธอ (Curse)	PiXXiE - bamm	A05	Champ
BETA M1	มูเตลู (Mutelu) - ฉันจะฉาปเธอ (Curse)	PiXXiE - bamm	A17	Music
BETA M2	วายร้าย (Villain) - ร้ายก็รัก	UrboyTJ - Joey Boy	A12	Keen
BETA M2	วายร้าย (Villain) - ร้ายก็รัก	UrboyTJ - Joey Boy	A20	Nut
BETA M2	วายร้าย (Villain) - ร้ายก็รัก	UrboyTJ - Joey Boy	A26	Tui
BETA M3	Sexy - Lady	Paradox - 25hours	A06	Deaw
BETA M3	Sexy - Lady	Paradox - 25hours	A09	Hong
BETA M3	Sexy - Lady	Paradox - 25hours	A25	Time
ALPHA	เพื่อน - ใครเพื่อนแก (Unfriend Zone)	Polycat - bamm	A08	Fluke
ALPHA	เพื่อน - ใครเพื่อนแก (Unfriend Zone)	Polycat - bamm	A16	Lego
ALPHA	เพื่อน - ใครเพื่อนแก (Unfriend Zone)	Polycat - bamm	A19	Nicky
ALPHA	เพื่อน - ใครเพื่อนแก (Unfriend Zone)	Polycat - bamm	A27	William

Special Guests – GMMTV Artists:

- Jiratchapong Srisang (Force)
- Kasidet Plookphol (Book)
- Phuwin Tangsakyuen
- Thanawin Teeraphosukarn (Louis)
- Worranit Thawornwong (Mook)
- Luke Ishikawa Plowden

=== Week 10: 4th Challenge ALPHA ===
Aside from the challenge, there is a special show from five contestants; two Alphas who did not participate in the challenge, Beta with the highest votes, Beta selected by the judges, and Beta selected by the special guests from last week.

4th Challenge ALPHA
Contestant ID	Song	Original Artist	Contestant	Position	Results
A08	ลาก่อน	YourMood	Fluke	ALPHA the fewest votes	No
A26	Very Very Small	Youngohm	Tui	BEST BETA	Yes
A16	17 นาที (17 mins)	Milli ft. mints	Lego	ALPHA challengee	Yes
A19	ชอบอยู่คนเดียว	Ink Waruntorn	Nicky	ALPHA didn't compete	SPECIAL SHOW
A27	ชอบอยู่คนเดียว	Ink Waruntorn	William	ALPHA didn't compete	SPECIAL SHOW
A05	ชอบอยู่คนเดียว	Ink Waruntorn	Champ	BETA top votes	SPECIAL SHOW
A20	ชอบอยู่คนเดียว	Ink Waruntorn	Nut	BETA selected by the judges	SPECIAL SHOW
A09	ชอบอยู่คนเดียว	Ink Waruntorn	Hong	BETA selected by the guests	SPECIAL SHOW

Special Guests – GMMTV Artists:

- Tawan Vihokratana (Tay)
- Jitaraphol Potiwihok (Jimmy)
- Tawinan Anukoolprasert (Sea)
- Tanapon Sukumpantanasan (Perth)
- Wachirawit Ruangwiwat (Chimon)
- Patara Eksangkul (Foei)

=== Week 11 & 12: Final Round ===
In the eleventh week, there is no competition; instead, the 8 Beta contestants must draw lots to be divided into two groups, as well as choose a song for the Final Round competition.

Special Guests – GMMTV Artists:

- Tawan Vihokratana (Tay)
- Atthaphan Phunsawat (Gun)
- Jirawat Sutivanichsak (Dew)

In the twelfth week, the rules and format of the Final Round are separated into two rounds, as follows:

- In Round 1, the eight Beta contestants will be divided into two groups of four each, and they will compete against one another using the song they have selected. The judges of the program will decide the winner in a knockout round. The winning group will be the Best Beta for the entire group and will be eligible to compete in the final round against Alpha. Aside from that, there's also a special show from the Alpha group.
- In Round 2, the Best Beta and Alpha groups will compete to perform their chosen songs and receive individual scores. The top four contestants with the highest overall points will be the show's winners. The performance evaluation ratio is 50% judge evaluations, 40% guest judge evaluations, and 10% audience votes during the broadcast.

During the winner announcement, it was a surprise that there was a title named King of Alpha, which was given to William by the judges. Therefore, the Alphas got an extra seat, making 5 victors from the show: William, Lego, Tui, Hong, and Nut.

Color key

- Best Group & Best Beta; qualified to the next round
- Eliminated from the show
- Alpha
- Winner of the show
- King of Alpha; winner of the show

Final Round
Round	Group	Song	Original Artist	Contestant ID	Contestant
Round 1
Round 1	BETA F1	ผู้โชคดี (The Lucky One)	Nine by Nine	A06	Deaw
Round 1	BETA F1	ผู้โชคดี (The Lucky One)	Nine by Nine	A09	Hong
Round 1	BETA F1	ผู้โชคดี (The Lucky One)	Nine by Nine	A12	Keen
Round 1	BETA F1	ผู้โชคดี (The Lucky One)	Nine by Nine	A20	Nut
Round 1	BETA F2	พี่ไม่หล่อลวง	BamBam	A02	Aungpao
Round 1	BETA F2	พี่ไม่หล่อลวง	BamBam	A05	Champ
Round 1	BETA F2	พี่ไม่หล่อลวง	BamBam	A08	Fluke
Round 1	BETA F2	พี่ไม่หล่อลวง	BamBam	A25	Time
Special Show
Special Show	ALPHA	มีแฟนแล้ว	Oat Pramote ft. UrboyTJ	A16	Lego
Special Show	ALPHA	มีแฟนแล้ว	Oat Pramote ft. UrboyTJ	A19	Nicky
Special Show	ALPHA	มีแฟนแล้ว	Oat Pramote ft. UrboyTJ	A26	Tui
Special Show	ALPHA	มีแฟนแล้ว	Oat Pramote ft. UrboyTJ	A27	William
Round 2
Round 2	BEST BETA	เสแสร้ง (Pretend)	Paper Planes ft. Moon		
Round 2	BEST BETA	เสแสร้ง (Pretend)	Paper Planes ft. Moon	A06	Deaw
Round 2	BEST BETA	เสแสร้ง (Pretend)	Paper Planes ft. Moon	A09	Hong
Round 2	BEST BETA	เสแสร้ง (Pretend)	Paper Planes ft. Moon	A12	Keen
Round 2	BEST BETA	เสแสร้ง (Pretend)	Paper Planes ft. Moon	A20	Nut
Round 2	ALPHA	วัดปะหล่ะ? (Test Me)	4EVE		
Round 2	ALPHA	วัดปะหล่ะ? (Test Me)	4EVE	A16	Lego
Round 2	ALPHA	วัดปะหล่ะ? (Test Me)	4EVE	A19	Nicky
Round 2	ALPHA	วัดปะหล่ะ? (Test Me)	4EVE	A26	Tui
Round 2	ALPHA	วัดปะหล่ะ? (Test Me)	4EVE	A27	William

Special Guests:

- Ae Botcash - Sanhapas Bunnag
- Chinawut Indracusin (Chin)
- Wichayanee Pearklin (Gam)
- Maiyarap - Nakalin Charunwittaya (Champ)

Special Guests – GMMTV Artists:

- Jiratchapong Srisang (Force)
- Kasidet Plookphol (Book)
- Worranit Thawornwong (Mook)
- Perawat Sangpotirat (Krist)
- Thitipoom Techaapaikhun (New)
- Archen Aydin (Joong)
- Natachai Boonprasert (Dunk)
- Tachakorn Boonlupyanun (Godji)

== Aftermath ==
LYKN debuted on May 5, 2023, with the single "เลิกกับเขาเดี๋ยวเหงาเป็นเพื่อน (MAY I?)".

Other contestants
- Some contestants signed with GMMTV:
  - Fluke starred in the 2024 television series Wandee Goodday. He also participated in several OSTs under GMMTV Records before forming part of a 3-member boy group FLIO and simultaneously forming part of the seven-member Thai-Japanese boy group WOLF & WANDER.
    - FLIO debuted with the single "ฟ้าสั่ง (Destiny)" on May 4, 2026 for the 2026 television series Wu and WOLF & WANDER debuted on July 17, 2026 with the single "Better Life".
  - Keen landed his first main role in the 2024 television series Only Boo! and participated in its OSTs.
  - Ashi debuted as an actor by appearing in the 2023 television series Cherry Magic, also participating in Only Boo! and its OSTs.
  - Aungpao debuted as an actor by starring in the 2023 television series Cooking Crush.
    - Keen, Ashi and Aungpao formed part of a 4-member boy group under GMMTV subsidiary Riser Music. CLO'VER debuted on November 27, 2025 with the single "คนคุ้นคอย (Next To You)".
  - Prom debuted in BRIQ Entertainment's 4-member boy group NEVONE on May 2, 2024, with the single "Shortcut" before signing with GMMTV on May 18, 2026.
- Some contestants joined new companies or debuted in new boy groups:
  - Nicky left A Bear Day Entertainment and joined Wing Thailand.
  - PeemPeem left GMM Music and joined Workpoint 23.
  - Otto left Recordy Studio and joined Domundi TV.
  - Kenji debuted in XEBIS Entertainment's 7-member co-ed group ALTERS on December 12, 2025, with the single "Giggle Wiggle".
  - Kade left Scorpions L’astiste and joined Headliner Thailand.
