= Thanat Danjesda =

Thai-Chinese singer, dancer, and actor (born 2003)

- ธนัท ด่านเจษฎา
- Thanat in August 2024
- Born: 20 April 2003 (age 23)
- Other names: Nut (นัท), Nutdan (Thai: นัทด่าน)
- Education: Chulalongkorn University
- Occupations: Singer; dancer; actor
- Years active: 2023–present
- Agent: GMMTV
- Notable work: Jun in ThamePo: Heart That Skips a Beat; Thiumek in My Magic Prophecy
- Height: 1.78 m (5 ft 10 in)
- Musical career
- Genre: T-pop
- Instrument: Vocals
- Label: Riser Music
- Member of: LYKN

Thanat Danjesda (Thai: ธนัท ด่านเจษฎา; born 20 April 2003), known professionally as Nutdan (Thai: นัทด่าน) or by his nickname Nut (Thai: นัท), is a Thai-Chinese singer, dancer, and actor. He is a member of the Thai boy band LYKN, a group managed by Riser Music and formed through GMMTV's survival reality show Project Alpha (2022). In addition to his musical career, he is known for portraying Jun in ThamePo: Heart That Skips a Beat (2024) and Thiumek in My Magic Prophecy (2025).

== Early life and education ==
Thanat was born on 20 April 2003 and grew up in Bangkok, Thailand, as the younger of two sons in a Thai-Chinese family. He attended Saint Gabriel's College for his secondary education. Around the age of ten, he began performing K-pop cover dances, eventually joining the cover dance group Monkey Kiss and participating in local competitions. He later pursued higher education at Chulalongkorn University, taking a one-year leave of absence during his pre-debut training before graduating with a Bachelor of Engineering in Nanoengineering from the International School of Engineering (ISE) in 2026.

== Career ==
=== 2022–2023: Pre-debut and Project Alpha ===
In late 2022, Thanat auditioned for GMMTV's reality competition show Project Alpha after being referred by a fellow schoolmate. During the competition, which aired from December 2022 to March 2023, he initially held a spot in the top-ranking "Alpha" group before dropping to the "Beta" team. He reclaimed his position in the finale, finishing fifth overall to secure his spot as a member of the Thai boy band LYKN.

=== 2023–present: Debut with LYKN and acting career ===
Thanat debuted as a member of LYKN, alongside William, Lego, Hong, and Tui, with the release of their digital single "เลิกกับเขาเดี๋ยวเหงาเป็นเพื่อน (May I?)" on 5 May 2023. In 2024, he made his television debut starring as Jun, a member of a fictional boy group named MARS, in the television series ThamePo: Heart That Skips a Beat. He later appeared in My Magic Prophecy (2025), in which he portrayed Thiumek, the main character's younger brother.

Alongside his music and acting work, Thanat has modeled for fashion brands including Calvin Klein and launched his own independent clothing label, cays, in September 2025. On 22 June 2026, he made his solo musical debut under the stage name Nutdan with the digital single "เทสดี (Tasty)" through Riser Music. He was subsequently cast in upcoming drama series, securing a supporting role as Way in Twenty One and a lead role as Winton in I Wanna Hold Your Hand.

== Personal life ==
On 11 April 2026, Thanat experienced the loss of his father, who passed away after a prolonged illness while Thanat was touring in Europe. Subsequently, GMMTV announced that he would temporarily step back from group activities to attend the funeral rites and spend time supporting his family, with LYKN continuing their scheduled appearances as a four-member group during his absence.

== Discography ==
=== Singles ===
==== As lead artist ====
Year	Title	Label	Ref.
2026	"เทสดี" (Tasty)	Riser Music	

== Filmography ==
Key
†	Denotes television productions that have not yet been released

=== Television series ===
Year	Title	Role	Notes	Ref.
2024	ThamePo: Heart That Skips a Beat	"Jun" Junn Tangsakultham	Main role	
2025	My Magic Prophecy	"Mek" Thiumek Kittipokin	Supporting role	
TBA	Twenty One †	Way	Supporting role	
TBA	I Wanna Hold Your Hand †	Winton	Main role	

=== Film ===
Year	Title	Role	Notes	Ref.
2023	No Worries	Himself	Short film for LYKN's third single of the same name	

=== Television shows ===
Year	Title	Network	Notes
2022–2023	Project Alpha	GMM 25	Contestant; Finished 5th (Alpha)
2025	Idol Energy	GMMTV YouTube channel	Regular member
2026	Idol Energy Season 2	GMMTV YouTube channel	Regular member

== Concerts and fan meetings ==
Title	Date	Venue	Notes	Ref.
ThamePo: The First Beat	13 December 2024	SF World Cinema, CentralWorld	With ThamePo cast	
ThamePo: Our Last Beat Fan Party	7 March 2025	MCC Hall, The Mall Lifestore Bankapi	With ThamePo cast	
Love Out Loud Fan Fest 2025: Lovemosphere	17–18 May 2025	Impact Arena	Guest artist	
Jimmy Sea Dreamscape Fancon	30 November 2025	Union Hall, Union Mall	Guest artist	
