= Rapeepong Supatineekitdecha =

Thai singer, dancer, and actor (born 2006)

- รพีพงศ์ ศุภธินีกิตติ์เดชา
- Rapeepong in October 2023
- Born: 11 February 2006 (age 20)
- Other name: Lego (เลโก้)
- Occupations: Singer; dancer; actor
- Years active: 2019–present
- Agents: Bstars Music (2019–2021); GMMTV (2023–present)
- Notable work: Nano in ThamePo: Heart That Skips a Beat; Ingky in MuTeLuv: Diva Deva Mata
- Height: 1.70 m (5 ft 7 in)
- Musical career
- Genre: T-pop
- Instrument: Vocals
- Labels: Bstars Music; Riser Music
- Member of: LYKN
- Formerly of: 1stKidz

Rapeepong Supatineekitdecha (Thai: รพีพงศ์ ศุภธินีกิตติ์เดชา; born 11 February 2006), nicknamed Lego (Thai: เลโก้), is a Thai singer, dancer, and actor. He began his entertainment career as a member of the co-ed group 1stKidz before participating in the GMMTV survival reality show Project Alpha (2022), later debuting as the main dancer of the boy band LYKN under Riser Music. In addition to his musical career, he is best known for his roles as Nano in ThamePo: Heart That Skips a Beat (2024) and Ingky in MuTeLuv: Diva Deva Mata (2025).

== Early life and education ==
Rapeepong was born on 11 February 2006 and raised in Nakhon Ratchasima, Thailand, alongside an older sister. He completed his secondary education at Sarasas Witaed Nakhon Ratchasima School. At age 13, he briefly considered pursuing a career in medicine before deciding to focus on the performing arts.

Rapeepong developed an interest in K-pop and dance at age four, making his first public performance that year with a cover of the Wonder Girls's "Nobody" at a family wedding. At age 13, he began formal vocal training and transitioned from local cover dance contests to a competitive hip-hop team in Nakhon Ratchasima, winning provincial and regional championships under structured training. During his school years, he also participated in the same dance club as Babymonster's Chiquita.

== Career ==
=== 2019–2022: Career beginnings and 1stKidz ===
Rapeepong entered the entertainment industry as a member of the Thai co-ed pop group 1stKidz, participating in their musical releases and promotions until their hiatus in 2021. Prior to the COVID-19 pandemic, he advanced to the final rounds of a K-pop global audition in Thailand. After health restrictions eased, he relocated to Bangkok at age 16 for advanced dance training. There, he joined a competitive hip-hop dance crew that placed second in a national championship, qualifying to represent Thailand at the 2022 World Hip Hop Dance Championship in Arizona, United States, where they became the only Thai team to reach the final round.

=== 2022–present: Debut with LYKN and acting career ===
Following a recommendation from his former dance instructor, Rapeepong auditioned for GMMTV's survival competition show Project Alpha. Throughout the competition, which aired from December 2022 to March 2023, he maintained his "Alpha" status as a top-ranking contestant, ultimately securing his spot as a member and main dancer of the Thai boy band LYKN.

Rapeepong debuted with bandmates William, Nut, Hong, and Tui with the release of their digital single "เลิกกับเขาเดี๋ยวเหงาเป็นเพื่อน (May I?)" on 5 May 2023. Alongside his musical activities with the group, he expanded his career into acting by starring as Nano, the main dancer of a fictional boy group named MARS, in the television series ThamePo: Heart That Skips a Beat (2024). He subsequently portrayed Ingky, one of the four high school influencer divas in the "Diva Deva Mata" segment of the supernatural romantic comedy anthology series MuTeLuv (2025).

In June 2026, he was featured on Felizz's single "มีแมวไหม (Cat Me If You Can)". On 4 October 2026, Rapeepong released his debut solo track "ไม่รวยไม่คุย (Rich)" under Riser Music. He contributed to the production layout and storyboards for the track's music video, drawing narrative inspiration from the 2005 action-comedy film Mr. & Mrs. Smith. He was subsequently cast in upcoming television Saran Wants You!.

== Public image and fashion ==
Rapeepong is known for his gender-fluid styling, incorporating both masculine and feminine aesthetics into his public image and stage performances. He has noted that observing diverse street performers and drag artists during a visit to the United States influenced his view that performance art and fashion transcend traditional gender boundaries. This approach has been featured in his solo stages at LYKN's concerts, including his cover of Tata Young's "Dhoom Dhoom" at the Unleashed Concert (2024), as well as Rihanna's "Bitch Better Have My Money" and "Rude Boy" at the Dusk & Dawn Concert (2025).

== Personal life ==
On 19 February 2026, shortly after turning 20 and a few days after performing at the Riser Music concert, Rapeepong was temporarily ordained as a Buddhist monk to express gratitude to his parents. The ceremony was attended by his family, friends, colleagues, and his LYKN bandmates. Upon entering the monkhood, he received the dharma name Dhammavangso (ธมฺมวํโส), meaning "one who belongs to the lineage of the Dhamma".

== Discography ==
=== Singles ===
==== As lead artist ====
Year	Title	Label	Ref.
2026	"ไม่รวยไม่คุย" (Rich)	Riser Music	

==== Collaborations ====
Year	Title	Label	Ref.
2026	"มีแมวไหม" (Cat Me If You Can) with Felizz	Riser Music	

=== 1stKidz singles ===
Year	Title	Label	Ref.
2019	"เชื่อหัวใจ" (WakeUp)	Bstars Music	
2020	"รักใช่หรือเปล่า (Let's Do It)"	Bstars Music	
2020	"PS."	Bstars Music	

== Filmography ==
Key
†	Denotes television productions that have not yet been released

=== Television series ===
Year	Title	Role	Notes	Ref.
2024	ThamePo: Heart That Skips a Beat	"Nano" Napassakorn Jatutaweechot	Main role	
2025	MuTeLuv: Diva Deva Mata	"Ingky" Daruni Laohongyokfah	Main role	
TBA	Saran Wants You! †	Kan	Supporting role	

=== Film ===
Year	Title	Role	Notes	Ref.
2023	No Worries	Himself	Short film for LYKN's third single of the same name	

=== Television shows ===
Year	Title	Network	Notes
2022–2023	Project Alpha	GMM 25	Contestant; Finished 2nd (Alpha)
2025	Idol Energy	GMMTV YouTube channel	Regular member
2026	Idol Energy Season 2	GMMTV YouTube channel	Regular member

=== Music video appearances ===
Year	Title	Artist	Notes	Ref.
2024	"Teedee Tada"	Diamond Narakorn	Special dance performance	

== Concerts and fan meetings ==
Title	Date	Venue	Notes	Ref.
ThamePo: The First Beat	13 December 2024	SF World Cinema, CentralWorld	With ThamePo cast	
ThamePo: Our Last Beat Fan Party	7 March 2025	MCC Hall, The Mall Lifestore Bankapi	With ThamePo cast	
Love Out Loud Fan Fest 2025: Lovemosphere	17–18 May 2025	Impact Arena	Guest artist	
Joss Gawin Heat & Beat Concert	28 July 2026	Union Hall, Union Mall	Guest artist	
GMMTV Fan Event in Tokyo	5–6 December 2026	Animate Theater, Tokyo	With LYKYOU	
