= Riser Music =

Thai record label

- Type: Subsidiary
- Industry: Entertainment
- Founded: 2023
- Headquarters: Bangkok, Thailand
- Key people: Tanatat Chaiyaat
- Parent: GMMTV; The One Enterprise

Riser Music is a Thai music label established in 2023 as a subsidiary of GMMTV, a leading entertainment company in Thailand. The label was founded to provide a focused and specialized platform dedicated to the development, promotion, and management of the music careers of GMMTV’s artists., Riser Music is distributed by GMM Music and Universal Music Japan (for Japan-exclusive releases).

== History ==
The label was officially launched on 20 January 2023 with the introduction of the solo artists Perawat Sangpotirat, Korapat Kirdpan, and Vachirawit Chivaaree on its social media platforms, followed by a press event on 5 April 2023 at Square A, CentralWorld in Bangkok, where its inaugural artists and projects were formally unveiled. Tanatat Chaiyaat was announced as the label's executive.

LYKN, a five-member boy group formed through the survival show Project Alpha, debuted with their single "May I?!" on 5 May 2023. On the same day, four-member girl group Sizzy joined the label after being managed under GMMTV Records since 2019. In the same year Metawin Opas-iamkajorn joined the label.

In 2024, Riser Music expanded its solo artist roster by signing Nattawat Jirochtikul, Norawit Titicharoenrak, Phuwin Tangsakyuen, and Tanapon Sukumpantanasan. That year, the label also introduced the boy group JASP.ER, formed by GMMTV actors Archen Aydin, Thanaboon Kiatniran, Pongsapak Udompoch, and Naravit Lertratkosum, who debuted with their single "Sadistic" on 19 December 2024.

Continuing its growth, Riser Music debuted Felizz, a six-member girl group composed of Charisar Oldham, Krongkwan Nakornthap, Napapat Sattha-atikom, Nutnicha Sangmanee, Chompoopuntip Temtanamongkol and Sillapintr Sillapachai, formerly known as Riser Rookies, with their single "See Through" on 23 May 2025.

Later that same year, Riser Music debuted another four-member male group named Clo'ver, consisting of Tinnasit Isarapongporn, Suvijak Piyanopharoj, Peerakan Teawsuwan and Ochiris Suwanacheep. Clo'ver released their debut single "คนคุ้นคอย (Next To You)" on 27 November 2025. Piyanopharoj, Teawsuwan and Suwanacheep were contestants on the survival show Project Alpha.

In 2026, Riser Music released their first duo signed to the label. EmiBonnie, made up of Thasorn Klinnium and Pattraphus Borattasuwan, released their debut single "ยิ่งชิดยิ่งคิด (Fall For You)" on 24 February 2026. Later that same year, the label expanded its solo artist roster again, signing Gawin Caskey after his appearances at the "Riser Music T-Pop Showcase 2026" concerts.

== Current artists ==
=== Soloists ===
- Krist (2023–present)
- Nanon (2023–present)
- Win (2023–present)
- Fourth (2024–present)
- Gemini (2024–present)
- Phuwin (2024–present)
- Perth (2024–present)
- Gawin (2026–present)

=== Duo ===
- EmiBonnie (2026–present)
  - Emi
  - Bonnie

=== Groups ===
- LYKN (2023–present)
  - William
  - Lego
  - Nut
  - Hong
  - Tui
- JASP.ER (2024–present)
  - Joong
  - Aou
  - Santa
  - Pond
- Felizz (2025–present)
  - Chari
  - Jaoying
  - Chelsea
  - Pream
  - Acare
  - Sangt
- Clo'ver (2025–present)
  - Barcode
  - Keen
  - Ashi
  - Aungpao

== Former artists ==
- Bright (2023)
- Sizzy (2023–24)
  - Jan
  - Jane
  - Ciize
  - Aye

== Studio albums ==
A list of Thai studio albums released by and promoted under the Riser Music label rather than its parent company.

| Title | Details |
|---|---|
| Adolescent | Artist: Bright; Released: June 17, 2023; Format: CD, digital download, streaming |
| The Secrets of The Universe | Artist: Nanon; Released: November 15, 2023; Format: CD, digital download, streaming |
| Dusk & Dawn | Artist: LYKN; Released: October 14, 2025; Format: CD, digital download, streaming |
| SEVEN: The Second Chapter | Artist: Nanon; Released: November 8, 2025; Format: CD, digital download, streaming |
| Silhouettes | Artist: Krist; Released: October 20, 2026; Format: CD, digital download, streaming |
| Reflexion | Artist: LYKN; Pending release: TBA; Format: TBA |

== Live performances and concerts ==
A list of live performances and concerts organised by and promoted under the Riser Music label rather than its parent company.

| Title | Date(s) | Venue | Artist(s) | Unsigned artist(s) | Ref. |
|---|---|---|---|---|---|
| Get Rising to RISER | May 5, 2023 | Centralworld, Square A | Krist, Bright, Nanon, Sizzy, LYKN | —N/a | |
| LYKN Unleashed Concert | September 21, 2024 | Thunder Dome, Muang Thong Thani | LYKN | —N/a | |
| Riser Music T-Pop Showcase 2025 | May 8, 2025 | Shibuya Stream Hall, Tokyo | LYKN | —N/a | |
| Riser Music T-Pop Showcase 2025 | May 9, 2025 | Shibuya Stream Hall, Tokyo | Krist, Nanon, LYKN | —N/a | |
| Riser Music T-Pop Showcase 2025 | May 10, 2025 | Shibuya Stream Hall, Tokyo | Nanon | —N/a | |
| Riser Music T-Pop Showcase 2025 | May 11, 2025 | Shibuya Stream Hall, Tokyo | Krist | —N/a | |
| LYKN Dusk & Dawn Concert | October 18–19, 2025 | Impact Arena, Muang Thong Thani | LYKN | —N/a | |
| Riser Concert: The First Rise | February 13–15, 2026 | Impact Arena, Muang Thong Thani | Krist, Nanon, Win, Fourth, Gemini, Phuwin, Perth, LYKN, JASP.ER, Felizz, Clo'ver | —N/a | |
| Clo'ver & Felizz T-Pop Showcase | May 3, 2026 | Hanaspace | Felizz, Clo'ver | —N/a | |
| Riser Music T-Pop Showcase 2026 | May 8, 2026 | Hokutopia Sakura Hall, Tokyo | Krist, Nanon, Felizz, Clo'ver | Gawin | |
| Riser Music T-Pop Showcase 2026 | May 10, 2026 | Shibuya Stream Hall, Tokyo | Krist, Nanon | Gawin | |
| Felizz & Clo'ver Happening Stage | August 5, 2026 | One Bangkok Park | Felizz, Clo'ver | —N/a | |
| T-Pop Stage in Paris | October 3, 2026 | Novotel Paris Est Centre de Conference | Clo'ver | —N/a | |
| LYKN Reflexion Concert | October 23–25, 2026 | Impact Arena, Muang Thong Thani | LYKN | —N/a | |
| JASP.ER Temptation Concert | December 18–20, 2026 | Impact Arena, Muang Thong Thani | JASP.ER | —N/a | |

== Timeline ==
Timeline of Riser Music artists
