= Jakrapatr Kaewpanpong =

Thai singer and actor (born 2005)

- จักรภัทร แก้วพันธุ์พงษ์
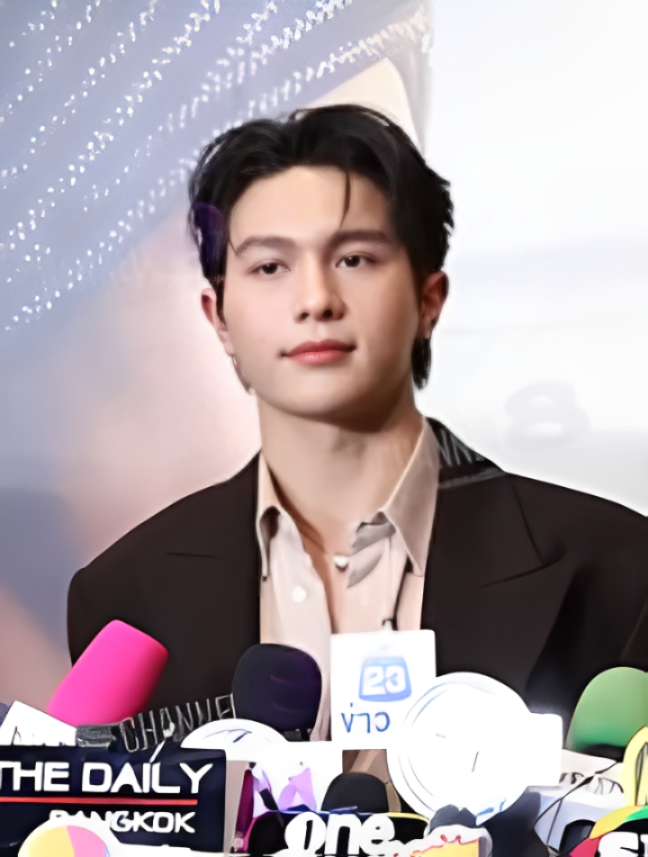
- Jakrapatr in June 2024
- Born: Phuwadol Kaewpanpong; 14 February 2005 (age 21); Hat Yai, Songkhla, Thailand
- Other name: William (วิลเลี่ยม)
- Occupations: Singer; actor
- Years active: 2023–present
- Agent: GMMTV
- Notable work: Thame in ThamePo: Heart That Skips a Beat; Rome in Me and Thee
- Height: 1.78 m (5 ft 10 in)
- Musical career
- Genre: T-pop
- Instrument: Vocals
- Label: Riser Music
- Member of: LYKN

Jakrapatr Kaewpanpong (Thai: จักรภัทร แก้วพันธุ์พงษ์; born 14 February 2005), nicknamed William (Thai: วิลเลี่ยม), is a Thai singer and actor. He is the main vocalist of the Thai boy band LYKN under Riser Music, formed through the GMMTV survival reality show Project Alpha (2022). Alongside his musical activities, he gained recognition through his acting debut as Thame in the television series ThamePo: Heart That Skips a Beat (2024), subsequently portraying Rome in Me and Thee (2025) and Dean in You Maniac (2026).

== Early life and education ==
Jakrapatr was born as Phuwadol Kaewpanpong on 14 February 2005 in Hat Yai, Thailand, where he lived until the ninth grade. Growing up, he understood the Southern Thai dialect but did not master speaking it. He has an older half-brother from his mother's side, and through his paternal great-grandfather, he is of American ancestry. During his childhood, he trained in taekwondo, eventually transitioning to competitive matches at the brown belt level and winning a fifth-grade gold medal by knockout. He subsequently completed his training to earn a black belt. He also studied piano from kindergarten through the eighth grade.

He attended Pholwitaya School in Hat Yai for his lower secondary education. During this period, he developed an interest in singing after watching Tom Isara's "Durian Mask" performance on the television show The Mask Singer (2016). He began practicing vocal technique independently at home before receiving formal vocal and guitar lessons.

Prior to adopting the name Jakrapatr, he legally changed his birth name to Natthaphong. He later enrolled in the Young Artist Music Program (YAMP), a college prep school offered by the College of Music, Mahidol University, majoring in Musical Theater.

== Career ==
=== 2020–2023: Pre-debut and Project Alpha ===
During his high school years, Jakrapatr served as a vocalist for student bands, including Lost & Found, Dolphin, and Broccoli. In 2022, he was selected as a contestant for GMMTV's reality competition show Project Alpha after passing a remote audition, following a recommendation from the head of his school's musical theatre department. Throughout the competition, which aired from December 2022 to March 2023, he established himself as a strong vocalist, delivering covers of tracks by artists including Tilly Birds and Jeff Satur. He maintained his "Alpha" status as a top-ranking contestant throughout the competition until the finale, where he placed first overall to earn the title "King of Alpha" and secure his spot as a member and main vocalist of the Thai boy band LYKN.

=== 2023–present: Debut with LYKN and acting career ===
Jakrapatr officially debuted as a member of LYKN under Riser Music, alongside Lego, Nut, Hong, and Tui, with the release of their digital single "เลิกกับเขาเดี๋ยวเหงาเป็นเพื่อน (May I?)" on 5 May 2023. In addition to his activities with the group, he released the solo soundtrack "ภาพสุดท้าย (Last Twilight)" for the 2023 television series Last Twilight. The track earned a nomination for Best Theme Song at the 29th Asian Television Awards.

In 2024, Jakrapatr made his television debut starring as Thame, the leader of a fictional boy group named MARS, in GMMTV's musical romantic drama television series ThamePo: Heart That Skips a Beat, appearing alongside Supha Sangaworawong (Est) and his fellow LYKN bandmates. For the series's soundtrack, he contributed the solo track "5CM". In July 2025, he launched an independent clothing brand, Zaven.

His on-screen partnership with Supha continued as part of the supporting cast in the romantic comedy television series Me and Thee (2025), in which Jakrapatr portrayed Rome, the main character's younger brother. The pair reunited the following year, with Jakrapatr starring in the lead role of Dean in the romantic drama series You Maniac (2026). Apart from group projects and acting roles, he expanded his solo discography under Riser Music by releasing his debut standalone single "จำได้ว่าลืม (Flashback)" on 9 July 2026, which featured a 1990s R&B and rock-influenced style. He was subsequently cast in upcoming television dramas, including High & Low: Born to Be High and The Halo, and was announced to star in the title role of the Thai stage musical adaptation of Dear Evan Hansen.

== Discography ==
=== Singles ===
==== As lead artist ====
Year	Title	Label	Ref.
2026	"จำได้ว่าลืม" (Flashback)	Riser Music	

==== Collaborations ====
Year	Title	Label	Ref.
2025	"เสียงหัวใจ (Love Echo)" with Est Supha	GMMTV Records	
2026	"Love Feels So Fast" with Est, Pond, Phuwin, Gemini, Fourth, Perth, Santa, Earth, Mix, Boun, Prem, Force, Book, Joong, Dunk, Jimmy, Sea, First, Khaotung, Junior, Mark, Joss, Gawin	GMMTV Records	

==== Soundtrack appearances ====
Year	Title	Soundtrack	Label	Ref.
2024	"ภาพสุดท้าย (Last Twilight)"	Last Twilight OST	GMMTV Records	
2025	"5CM"	ThamePo: Heart That Skips a Beat OST	GMMTV Records	
2025	"ระหว่างทาง (Good Time)" (Cover) (original by Bright, Thanaerng) with Est Supha	ThamePo: Heart That Skips a Beat OST	GMMTV Records	
2026	"Red Flag" with Est Supha	You Maniac OST	GMMTV Records	
2026	"อาการจะรัก (Love Symptoms)" with Est Supha	You Maniac OST	GMMTV Records	
2026	"ครั้งหนึ่ง (One More Night)"	You Maniac OST	GMMTV Records	
2026	"Here With You"	You Maniac OST	GMMTV Records	
2026	"ใจภักดิ์ (wherever, whenever)"	Scarlet Heart Ullavee OST	GMMTV Records	

== Acting credits ==
Key
†	Denotes television productions that have not yet been released

=== Television series ===
Year	Title	Role	Notes	Ref.
2024	ThamePo: Heart That Skips a Beat	"Thame" Teema Kanjanakittkul	Main role	
2025	Me and Thee	"Rome" Kritdanai Lee	Supporting role	
2026	Peach and Me	"Rome" Kritdanai Lee	Supporting role	
2026	You Maniac	Dean	Main role	
TBA	High & Low: Born to Be High †	Rang	Main role	
TBA	The Halo †	Win	Main role	

=== Film ===
Year	Title	Role	Notes	Ref.
2023	No Worries	Himself	Short film for LYKN's third single of the same name	

=== Theater ===
Year	Title	Role	Venue	Date	Ref(s)
2027	Dear Evan Hansen Thailand	Evan Hansen	TBA	TBA	

=== Television shows ===
Year	Title	Network	Notes
2022–2023	Project Alpha	GMM 25	Contestant; Finished 1st (King of Alpha)
2025	Idol Energy	GMMTV YouTube channel	Regular member
2026	Idol Energy Season 2	GMMTV YouTube channel	Regular member

=== Music video appearances ===
Year	Title	Artist	Ref.
2025	"ไม่อยากเป็นรักแรก (Your Last)"	Est Supha	

== Fan meetings ==
Title	Date	Venue	Notes	Ref.
Last Twilight Final EP. Fan Meeting	26 January 2024	Siam Pavalai Royal Grand Theater, Siam Paragon	Guest artist	
Tom Isara Birthday Fan Meeting	3 June 2024	Found Venue, Bangkok	Guest artist	
Last Twilight Fan Meeting in Manila	12 October 2024	UP Theatre, Manila	Guest artist	
ThamePo: The First Beat	13 December 2024	SF World Cinema, CentralWorld	With ThamePo cast	
ThamePo: Our Last Beat Fan Party	7 March 2025	MCC Hall, The Mall Lifestore Bankapi	With ThamePo cast	
William Fan Party in Tianjin	5 April 2025	Tianjin, China	—N/a	
WilliamEst 1st Fan Meeting "West Side Story" in Hong Kong	31 August 2025	AXA Dreamland, Go Park, Hong Kong	With Est	
WilliamEst 1st Fan Meeting in Taipei	20 September 2025	Legacy Taipei, Taipei	With Est	
WilliamEst Fan Meeting "Keep The Beat" in Vietnam	25 October 2025	Hòa Bình District 10 Cultural Center, Ho Chi Minh City	With Est	
WilliamEst JIB Dream Fan Meeting in Rome	13 December 2025	Hilton Rome Airport Hotel, Rome	With Est	
GMMTV Fanday 28 in Tokyo	11 January 2026	Nissho Hall, Tokyo	With Est	
Me and Thee: Fan Party	17 January 2026	Union Hall, Union Mall	With Me and Thee cast	
Me and Thee: After Fan Party	18 January 2026	Union Hall, Union Mall	With Me and Thee cast	
WilliamEst 1st Fan Meeting "Echo: Resonance" in Singapore	24 January 2026	GVmax Vivocity, Singapore	With Est	
GMMTV Fanday 29 in USA	8 March 2026	Racket NYC, New York City	With Est	
GMMTV Fanday 29 in USA	10 March 2026	Brooklyn Steel, New York City	With Est	
GMMTV Fanday 29 in USA	15 March 2026	Alex Theatre, California	With Est	
WilliamEst "Lovestruck" Fan Meeting in Manila	23 March 2026	Metrotent Convention Center, Manila	With Est	
You Maniac: Opening Night	29 August 2026	MCC Hall, The Mall Lifestore Bangkapi	With You Maniac Cast	
You Maniac Final EP. Fan Meeting	31 October 2026	Union Hall, Union Mall	With You Maniac Cast	
Scarlet Heart Ullavee The Grand Premiere	4 November 2026	Union Hall, Union Mall	Guest artist	

== Concerts ==
Title	Date	Venue	Notes	Ref.
Jeff Satur Red Giant Concert	3 May 2025	Impact Arena	Guest artist	
Love Out Loud Fan Fest 2025: Lovemosphere	17–18 May 2025	Impact Arena	With Est, Earth, Mix, Boun, Prem, Pond, Phuwin, Force, Book, Joong, Dunk, Jimmy, Sea, First, Khaotung, Gemini, Fourth, Perth, Santa, Winny, Satang	
WilliamEst WE Magnetic Fancon	9–10 August 2025	Union Hall, Union Mall	With Est	
Love Out Loud Fan Fest 2026: Heart Race	22–24 May 2026	Impact Arena	With Est, Earth, Mix, Boun, Prem, Pond, Phuwin, Force, Book, Joong, Dunk, Jimmy, Sea, First, Khaotung, Gemini, Fourth, Perth, Santa, Junior, Mark, Joss, Gawin	
WilliamEst Reign Together Concert	5–7 December 2026	Impact Arena	With Est	

== Awards and nominations ==
Year	Award	Category	Work	Result	Ref.
2024	Maya TV Awards 2024	Original Soundtrack of The Year	"ภาพสุดท้าย (Last Twilight)"	Nominated	
2024	29th Asian Television Awards	Best Theme Song	"ภาพสุดท้าย (Last Twilight)"	Nominated	
2024	Y Entertain Awards 2024	OST. of the Year	"ภาพสุดท้าย (Last Twilight)"	Nominated	
2024	Y Universe Awards 2024	The Best Series OST; Judges' Choice	"ภาพสุดท้าย (Last Twilight)"	Nominated	
2024	Y Universe Awards 2024	The Best Series OST; Popular Vote	"ภาพสุดท้าย (Last Twilight)"	Nominated	
2025	TOTY Music Awards 2024	POPular OST. of the Year	"ภาพสุดท้าย (Last Twilight)"	Nominated	
2025	ContentAsia Awards 2025	Best Asian LGBTQ+ Programme	ThamePo: Heart That Skips a Beat	Won	
2025	ContentAsia Awards 2025	Best Original Song Created in Asia for an Asian TV Series/Programme or Movie	"5CM"	Nominated	
2025	Howe Awards 2025	Rising Icon Award	—N/a	Won	
2026	TOTY Music Awards 2025	POPular OST. of the Year	"5CM"	Nominated	
2026	Kazz Awards 2026	Hottest Artist Award with Est Supha	—N/a	Won	
2026	Kazz Awards 2026	Most Trending on Social Media with Me and Thee cast	Me and Thee	Won	
