= LYKN =

Thai boy band

LYKN ไลแคน
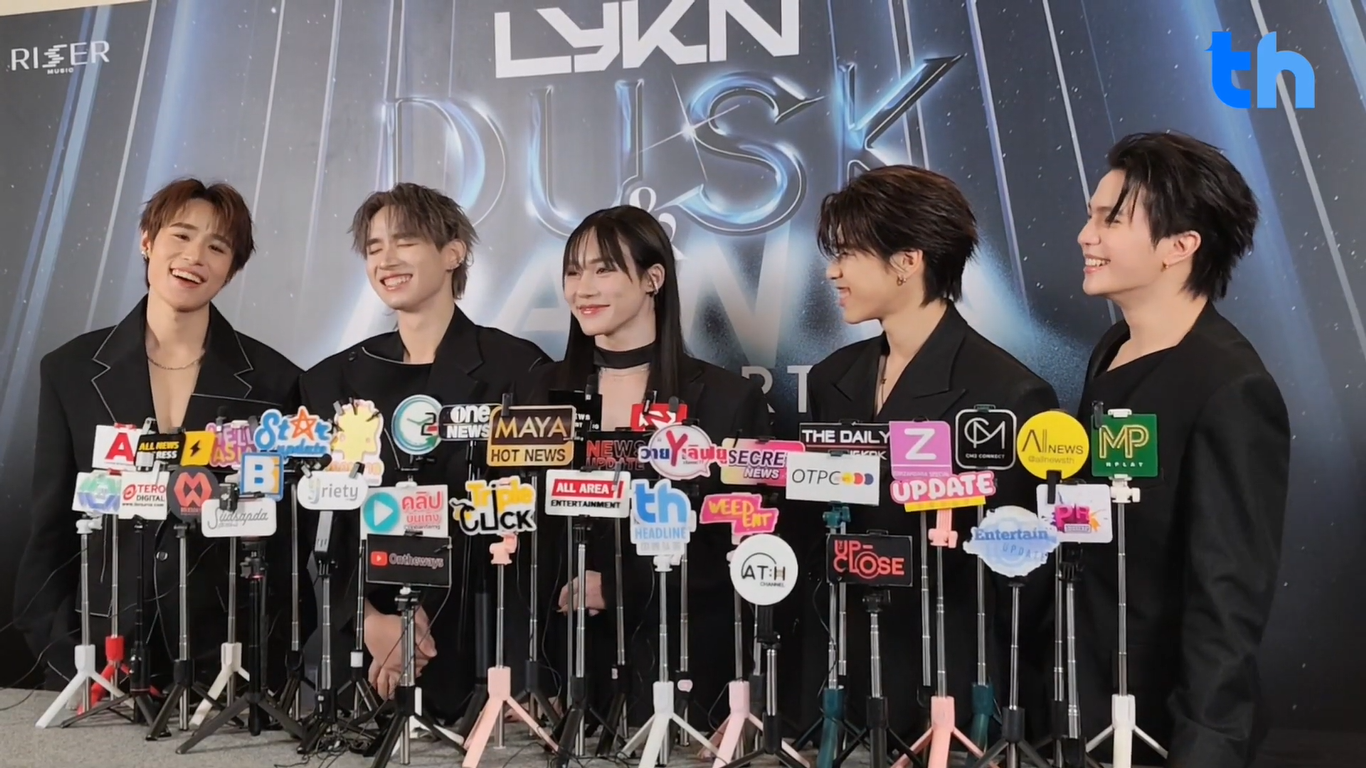
- LYKN in October 2025; Left to Right: Nut, Hong, Lego, Tui, and William

Background information
- Origin: Bangkok, Thailand
- Genre: T-pop
- Years active: 2023–present
- Label: Riser Music
- Members: Nut; Hong; Tui; William; Lego
- Website: gmm-tv.com

LYKN (pronounced as lycan; Thai: ไลแคน) is a Thai boy band formed through GMMTV's reality competition program Project Alpha. The group consists of five members: Nut, Hong, Tui, William, and Lego. They debuted on May 5, 2023, with the single "เลิกกับเขาเดี๋ยวเหงาเป็นเพื่อน (May I?)".

== Name ==
The name LYKN was introduced during the Riser Music launching event "Get Rising to Riser" on April 5, 2023. The band's name being a homophone of the word "lycan" which represents the ability of a human being able to transform into a werewolf anytime. It is also an abbreviation for their official greeting "We Let You KNow".

== History ==
=== Pre-debut activities and formation through Project Alpha ===
In April 2022, GMMTV announced its upcoming survival show Project Alpha, seeking male trainees aged 16 to 24. LYKN was formed through the program, which aired on GMM25 from December 4, 2022, to March 5, 2023. Out of 28 initial trainees, five members were chosen from the eight finalists during the live finale on March 5, 2023.

Prior to the show, all five members had backgrounds in music and dance. Nut and Hong were active in K-pop cover dance groups during their school years, with Nut performing in Monkey Kiss and Hong in TNT. Tui also practiced cover dancing without a permanent team, focusing instead on vocal group competitions. William frequently performed in school musical theater and played in several school bands, including Broccoli in 2022. Lego was a member of the co-ed group 1stKidz from 2019 to 2021, and he also competed in the 2022 World Hip Hop Dance Championship.

=== 2023: Debut with May I?, first overseas event, and No Worries short film ===
Following an announcement in late April, LYKN officially debuted on May 5 with the single "May I?" (เลิกกับเขาเดี๋ยวเหงาเป็นเพื่อน) and its accompanying music video. The track earned the group the "Rookie of the Week" title for four consecutive weeks on T-Pop Stage Show. On May 16, LYKN made their first public post-debut appearance at the Kazz Awards 2023, followed by their first overseas performances across two days at the Thai Festival Tokyo 2023. On July 5, the group announced their official fandom name, LYKYOU (ไลค์ยู), before returning to Japan later that month for GMMTV Musicon in Tokyo.

On August 3, the group released their second single, "UMM UMM". Ahead of their third single, "No Worries", LYKN released a Halloween-themed short film of the same name on October 30. Starring the group alongside Rebecca Patricia Armstrong as ghosts visiting the living world, the project marked the members' first venture into acting. The single's music video followed two days later. On December 16, LYKN held their first performance in Indonesia at GMMTV Musicon in Jakarta, and on December 19, they collaborated with Sizzy on the GMMTV Starlympic 2023 theme song, "Hui Lay Hui".

=== 2024: Subsequent releases, first solo concert, and ThamePo series ===
On February 22, LYKN released a group rendition of "Last Twilight" on YouTube, a track originally performed by member William for the soundtrack of the television series of the same name. On April 4, Riser Music released the group's fourth single, "Charm", a collaboration with fellow GMMTV artists Joong and Pond.

On May 5, LYKN performed in Malaysia for the first time at the Banyak Bagus Festival. After performing at the GOTCHA POP 2 Concert on May 11, they embarked on a week-long promotional tour in Japan, appearing at the Thai Festival Tokyo 2024, the GMMTV Fan-Event in Tokyo, and the Thai Festival in Nagoya. On May 28, LYKN won their first major accolade, taking home Best New Artist for "No Worries" at the 20th Kom Chad Luek Awards. They followed this on July 4 with their fifth single "Trust Me", featuring a music video starring Narilya Gulmongkolpech and Puttipong Jitbut.

LYKN at their press conference for Unleashed Concert on September 21, 2024

On September 21, LYKN held their first solo concert, the "LYKN Unleashed Concert", to an audience of 3,500 at Thunder Dome in Muang Thong Thani, Nonthaburi Province. Tickets sold out immediately upon release on August 3. The three-hour show, which was also livestreamed via The Concert, featured guest appearances by Project Alpha contestants alongside Joong and Pond. During the concert, LYKN performed a previously unreleased fan-dedicated song written and composed by Tui titled "LYKYOU". Following the event, Riser Music announced that the group would embark on their first Asia tour. Ahead of the concert, on September 10, LYKN released their sixth single, "Sugoi".

On October 29, the group released a second Halloween-themed single, "Trick or Treat", featuring Chrrissa Chotijirasathit. On November 23, they shared a group version of "From Now On" on YouTube, a soundtrack song from the 2024 series Kidnap originally performed by Tui. Three days later, during the "GMMTV 2025: RIDING THE WAVE" press event, GMMTV managing director Sataporn Panichraksapong revealed the initial five cities for the LYKN Unleashed Asia Tour: Taipei, Jakarta, Tokyo, Singapore, and Phnom Penh, while hinting at future dates. The group followed this on December 4 by releasing a studio version and music video for "LYKYOU".

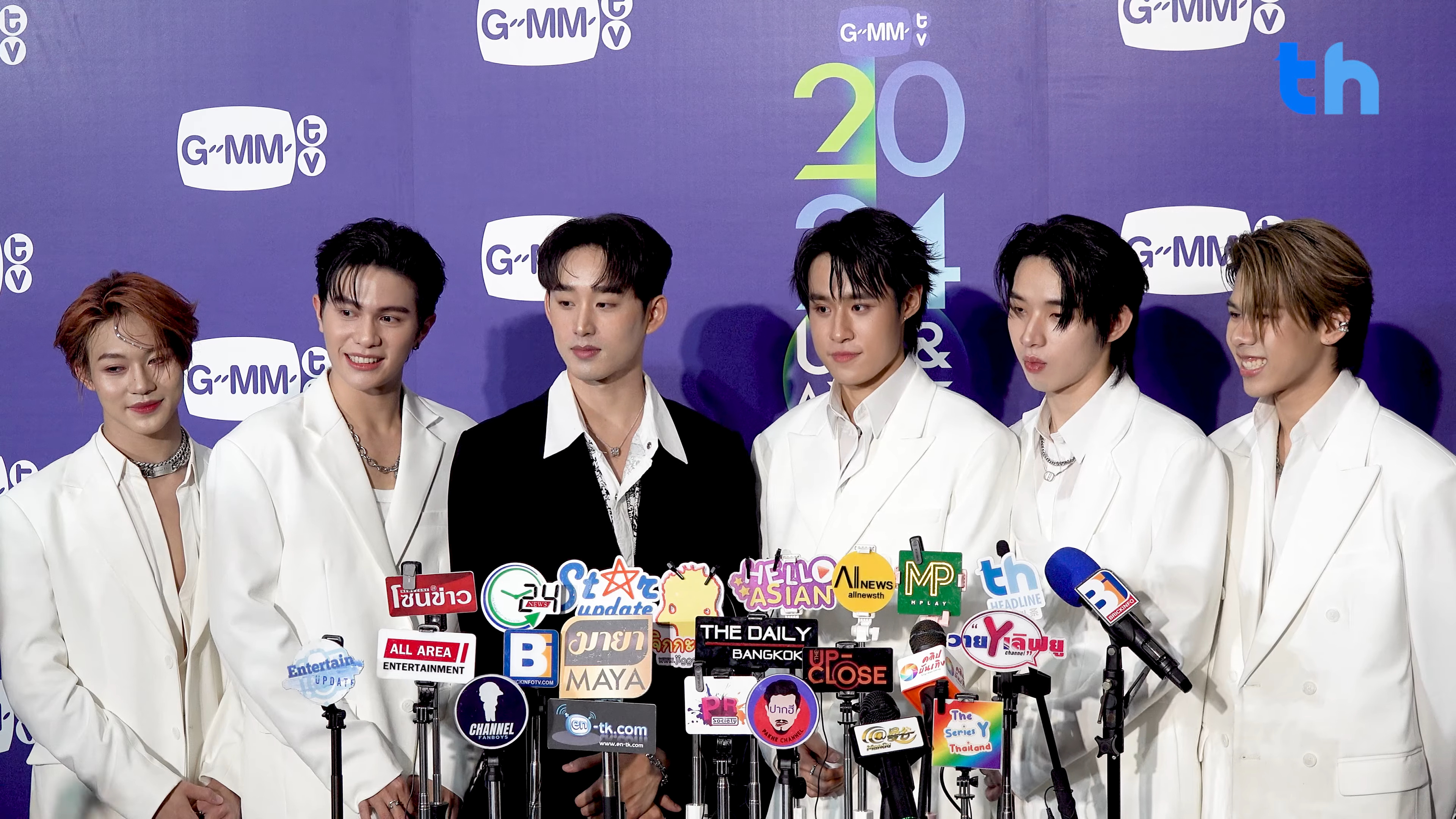
LYKN with Supha Sangaworawong (Est), co-star of ThamePo: Heart That Skips a Beat, in April 2024

In late 2024, LYKN made their television acting debut in the series ThamePo: Heart That Skips a Beat, portraying the fictional boy band MARS. First announced at the "GMMTV 2024: UP & ABOVE Part 2" conference, the series aired from December 2024 to March 2025 on GMM25 and Netflix. The members played the lead roles, with William as Teema Kanjanakittkul (Thame), Hong as Dylan Zhou, Nut as Junn Tangsakultham (Jun), Lego as Napassakorn Jatutaweechot (Nano), and Tui as Pavee Warisphol (Pepper). The group also contributed several songs to the soundtrack.

=== 2025: First tour, first studio album Dusk & Dawn, and second solo concert ===
On January 6, LYKN launched their own official YouTube channel, transitioning their content away from the Riser Music channel. The following month, they kicked off the LYKN Unleashed Asia Tour at the Bekasi Convention Center in Jakarta on February 23, continuing on to Tokyo, Singapore, Phnom Penh, and Taipei. Amidst the tour, LYKN won Best Boy Group of the Year at The Guitar Mag Awards 2025 on March 11.

On April 21, Riser Music unveiled the group's 2025 roadmap, detailing a string of single releases starting in May, their debut studio album in June, an official photobook in August, a fan-signing event in September, and a second solo concert at Impact Arena on October 18. On May 5, LYKN announced the title of their 12-track debut album, Dusk & Dawn, which featured four new songs scheduled for consecutive release. They simultaneously expanded their tour to Macau, Ho Chi Minh City, Bengaluru, Delhi, Los Angeles, and Manila, rebranding it as the LYKN Unleashed Tour. The next day, they revealed "First Sight" as the album's seventh track, releasing the single alongside a music video starring Rachanun Mahawan on May 14. On June 20, LYKN added Mexico City and New York City to their itinerary, rebranding the venture as the LYKN Unleashed World Tour. A few days later, the group introduced the album's eighth track, "Drip". Produced by UrboyTJ, the single was released on July 4 with a music video starring Jittanan Sirisamrit.

On August 13, LYKN announced that their second concert would share its title with their debut album, Dusk & Dawn, and expand into a two-day event. Ahead of the shows, they released the album's ninth track, "Foreground" on August 27 with a music video starring Pathitta Pornchumroenrut and Thanachai Sakchaicharoenkul. Three days later, tickets for the Impact Arena shows went on sale, with all 24,000 seats selling out shortly after release. On September 5, GMMTV announced that the American leg of the tour had been postponed due to visa issues, rescheduling the three dates to March 2026. Later that month, on September 24, the group held a fan-signing event ahead of Dusk & Dawn's digital release on October 14, which coincided with the release of its tenth track, "Feel Like Me", featuring Thai rapper SMEW, the winner of The Rapper 2021.

On October 18–19, LYKN held the "LYKN Dusk & Dawn Concert" at Impact Arena. Both sold-out shows lasted over four hours and featured guest appearances by UrboyTJ on the first night, Jeff Satur on the second, and labelmates Felizz on both dates.

During the "GMMTV 2026: Magic Vibes Maximized" press conference on November 25, GMMTV managing director Sataporn Panichraksapong unveiled the group's 2026 plans, including a second studio album, a third solo concert, and the LYKN Dusk & Dawn World Tour. Promoted as the first full-scale world tour by a T-pop act, the itinerary spanned 18 cities across Europe, North America, South America, and Asia. On December 7, Riser Music also announced its label-wide festival, "Riser Concert: The First Rise", featuring LYKN and originally scheduled for February 14–15, 2026, at Impact Arena.

=== 2026–present: Dusk & Dawn World Tour, Reflexion, and solo releases ===
On February 10, LYKN released the Latin-influenced dance-pop single "No Way". Three days later, they performed at the Riser Concert at Impact Arena, which had expanded to a three-day run from February 13 to 15 due to rapid ticket sales. Shortly after the concert, on February 19, member Lego underwent a traditional Thai Buddhist ordination ceremony to enter temporary monkhood, which was attended by his fellow group members. In March, LYKN embarked on the rescheduled American leg of their previous tour. During the final stop in Los Angeles, they announced the North American dates for the upcoming LYKN Dusk & Dawn World Tour.

On March 29, LYKN kicked off the LYKN Dusk & Dawn World Tour at the Palladium in Warsaw, Poland, marking their first performance in Europe. Shortly into the tour, on April 2, the group announced their second studio album, Reflexion, a 12-track project featuring consecutive single releases, starting with "No Way", as well as solo songs for each member. On April 7, Hong made his solo debut under the stage name Hongshi with the single "Let's Go", followed on April 23 by the group single "If Only", whose music video starred Pattariyakorn Luangkungwankij.

The European leg continued through April with stops in Berlin, Paris, Milan, and London, followed by a performance in Tokyo on May 11. Four days later, LYKN released "You Shine I Choose", a promotional collaboration with Bow Maylada. On June 5, Lego featured on Felizz's digital single "Cat Me If You Can". Later that month, Nut made his solo debut as Nutdan with "Tasty" on June 22, and William released his solo single "Flashback" on July 9 alongside a music video co-starring Sarocha Chankimha. Two days later, the tour resumed with a show in Jakarta.

In August, LYKN performed in São Paulo, Brazil, on August 9 before embarking on a two-week tour across the United States. The following day, the group announced the "LYKN Reflexion Concert" for October 24–25 at Impact Arena. On August 16, Tui released his solo single "Bloom", featuring JingJing Yu in its music video. When concert tickets went on sale on August 22, high demand prompted the addition of a third show on October 23, with all three dates selling out. As part of promotions for Reflexion, LYKN released the single "Oh My Gosh" on September 15, with a music video featuring Chanitsiri Ratananimit, before concluding the international leg of their tour later that month in Singapore, Manila, Osaka, and Ho Chi Minh City. On 4 October 2026, Lego made his solo debut with his track "ไม่รวยไม่คุย (Rich)".

On October 19, ahead of their third solo concert, LYKN released the single "Not Again" featuring Joke iScream. The following day, amid online criticism regarding similarities between the track's Korean rap lyrics and I.O.I's "Crush", Riser Music issued an apology and temporarily removed the song from streaming platforms. A revised version with updated Korean lyrics was re-released on October 22. From October 23 to 25, the group held the sold-out "LYKN Reflexion Concert" at Impact Arena in Muang Thong Thani. The three-day event featured guest appearances by Project Alpha judge Saksit Vejsupaporn on the first night, D Gerrard on the second, Jintara Poonlarp on the third, and Joke iScream on all three dates. During the shows, LYKN also premiered a previously unreleased track titled "Always Been", before officially releasing the single and its music video on November 13 as the next track from Reflexion.

== Members ==
- Thanat Danjesda / Nut – lead dancer, vocalist
  (Thai: ธนัท ด่านเจษฎา / นัท)
- Pichetpong Chiradatesakunvong / Hong – main rapper, lead dancer, vocalist
  (Thai: พิเชฐพงศ์ จิรเดชสกุลวงศ์ / ฮง)
- Chayatorn Trairattanapradit / Tui – lead vocalist, lead rapper
  (Thai: ชยธร ไตรรัตนประดิษฐ์ / ตุ้ย)
- Jakrapatr Kaewpanpong / William – main vocalist
  (Thai: จักรภัทร แก้วพันธุ์พงษ์ / วิลเลี่ยม)
- Rapeepong Supatineekitdecha / Lego – main dancer, vocalist
  (Thai: รพีพงศ์ ศุภธินีกิตติ์เดชา / เลโก้)

== Discography ==
=== Studio albums ===
==== Thai studio albums ====
Title	Details
Dusk & Dawn	Released: October 14, 2025; Label: Riser Music; Format: CD, digital download, streaming
Reflexion	Released: TBA; Label: Riser Music; Format: CD, digital download, streaming

==== Japanese studio albums ====
Title	Details	Peak chart positions	Sales
Title	Details	JPN	Sales
Dusk & Dawn (Japanese Deluxe)	Released: April 1, 2026; Label: Universal Music Japan; Format: CD, digital download, streaming; Track listing: 1. "May I?"; 2. "Umm Umm"; 3. "No Worries"; 4. "Charm"; 5. "Trust Me"; 6. "Sugoi"; 7. "First Sight"; 8. "Drip"; 9. "Foreground"; 10. "Feel Like Me"; 11. "Trick or Treat"; 12. "Lykyou"; 13. "Charm" (Japanese ver.); 14. "No Worries" (Japanese ver.)	13	JPN: 3,406

=== Singles ===
Title	Year	Album
"เลิกกับเขาเดี๋ยวเหงาเป็นเพื่อน" (May I?)	2023	Dusk & Dawn
"UMM UMM"	2023	Dusk & Dawn
"แอบรักไม่ทำให้ใครตาย" (No Worries)	2023	Dusk & Dawn
"ฉ่ำ" (Charm) Feat. Joong, Pond	2024	Dusk & Dawn
"ความรักไม่ได้น่ากลัวขนาดนั้น" (Trust Me)	2024	Dusk & Dawn
"โฮ่ง!" (Sugoi)	2024	Dusk & Dawn
"หยอกไม่หลอก" (Trick or Treat) Feat. Chrrissa	2024	Dusk & Dawn
"LYKYOU"	2024	Dusk & Dawn
"ทัก" (First Sight)	2025	Dusk & Dawn
"น้ำหยดลงหิน" (Drip) Prod. by UrboyTJ	2025	Dusk & Dawn
"หน้าเบลอหลังชัด" (Foreground)	2025	Dusk & Dawn
"ชอบก็บอก" (Feel Like Me)	2025	Dusk & Dawn
"โลเล โยเย โมเม" (No Way)	2026	Reflexion
"ถูกสเปก" (Let’s Go) (Hongshi (Note: solo stage name of LYKN member Hong.) solo)	2026	Reflexion
"ถ้าเกิด" (If Only)	2026	Reflexion
"เทสดี" (Tasty) (Nutdan (Note: solo stage name of LYKN member Nut.) solo)	2026	Reflexion
"จำได้ว่าลืม" (Flashback) (William solo)	2026	Reflexion
"ปล่อยใจ" (Bloom) (Tui solo)	2026	Reflexion
"หน้าไหว้หลังหลอก" (Oh My Gosh)	2026	Reflexion
"ไม่รวยไม่คุย" (Rich) (Lego solo)	2026	Reflexion
"ครั้งแรกพอทน" (Not Again) Feat. JOKE iScream	2026	Reflexion
"คงต้องเป็นคนนี้" (Always Been)	2026	Reflexion

=== Promotional singles ===
Title	Year	Artists	Details	Album
HUI LAY HUI	2023	LYKN, SIZZY	Theme song for GMMTV Starlympic 2023	Non-album single
"ล็อกมง" (You Shine I Choose)	2026	LYKN Feat. Bow Maylada	Theme song for Eversense Thailand	Non-album single
"รักมาก แม็คโคร" (Rak Mak Makro)	2026	LYKN Feat. Makro	Theme song for Makro Thailand's 37th anniversary	Non-album single

=== Soundtrack appearances ===
Title	Year	Album
"All I Need"	2024	ThamePo: Heart That Skips a Beat OST
"I Know You Want Me"	2024	ThamePo: Heart That Skips a Beat OST
"จีบได้มั้ย?" (Would You Mind?)	2025	ThamePo: Heart That Skips a Beat OST
"หูดับ" (Who Says)	2025	ThamePo: Heart That Skips a Beat OST
"Fly High"	2025	ThamePo: Heart That Skips a Beat OST

== Filmography ==
=== Short films ===
- No Worries (2023)

=== Television shows ===
Year	Title	Notes	Ref.
2022	Project Alpha	GMMTV survival show; 12 episodes	
2024	ThamePo: Heart That Skips a Beat	As boy band MARS; Main roles, 13 episodes	

=== Online shows ===
Year	Title	Notes	Ref.
2022–2023	Alpha Lab	Pre-debut reality show; 22 episodes	
2023	Alpha Live Room	Road to debut live show; 6 episodes	
2023	Alpha X	Road to debut talent showcase; 5 episodes	
2023	Alpha Roommate	Road to debut reality show; 8 episodes	
2023	LYKN - DAY 1 to Debut	Road to debut documentary	
2023	LYKN Late Night Live	Post-debut live show	
2023–present	LYKN Behind the Scenes	Behind-the-scenes footage from LYKN's music videos	
2023–present	LYKN Landing	LYKN's trips abroad documentary	
2023–present	LYKN Event	Documentary footage of LYKN's promotional events and fan meetings	
2025–2026	I LYKYOU	Documentary on LYKN's Unleashed Tour	
2025–present	LYKN We Let You Play	Variety web series featuring games and activities played by LYKN	

== Concerts and tours ==
=== Solo concerts ===
Title	Date	City	Country	Venue
LYKN Unleashed Concert	September 21, 2024	Bangkok	Thailand	Thunder Dome
LYKN Dusk & Dawn Concert	October 18–19, 2025	Bangkok	Thailand	Impact Arena
LYKN Reflexion Concert	October 23–25, 2026	Bangkok	Thailand	Impact Arena

=== Headlining tours ===
==== LYKN Unleashed World Tour (2025–2026) ====
Note: (Note: formerly known as LYKN Unleashed Asia Tour and LYKN Unleashed Tour, changed due to additional cities for the tour including Los Angeles, Mexico City and New York City.)

Date	City	Country	Venue
February 23, 2025	Jakarta	Indonesia	Bekasi Convention Center
March 2, 2025	Tokyo	Japan	B1F Hall, Bellesalle Shiodome
March 9, 2025	Singapore		The Theatre at Mediacorp
March 30, 2025	Phnom Penh	Cambodia	Aeon Mall Sen Sok City
April 20, 2025 (Note: originally scheduled for February 9, 2025.)	Taipei	Taiwan	WESTAR
June 8, 2025	Macau	China	Broadway Macau
June 22, 2025	Ho Chi Minh City	Vietnam	Army Theatre
August 15, 2025	Bengaluru	India	Wings Arenas Kothanur
August 17, 2025	Delhi	India	Talkatora Indoor Stadium
September 27, 2025	Manila	Philippines	SM North EDSA Sky Dome
March 5, 2026 (Note: originally scheduled for September 10, 2025.)	Mexico City	Mexico	Teatro Metropólitan
March 9, 2026 (Note: originally scheduled for September 13, 2025.)	New York City	United States	Music Hall of Williamsburg
March 14, 2026 (Note: originally scheduled for September 16, 2025.)	Los Angeles	United States	Alex Theatre

==== LYKN Dusk & Dawn World Tour (2026) ====
Date	City	Country	Venue
March 29, 2026	Warsaw	Poland	Palladium
April 1, 2026	Berlin	Germany	Uber Eats Music Hall
April 4, 2026	Paris	France	Arena Grand Paris
April 7, 2026	Milan	Italy	Teatro Lirico Giorgio Gaber
April 10, 2026	London	England	O2 Shepherd's Bush Empire
May 11, 2026	Tokyo	Japan	Zepp DiverCity
June 14, 2026	Taipei	Taiwan	Zepp New Taipei
July 11, 2026	Jakarta	Indonesia	The Kasablanka Hall
July 18, 2026	Macau	China	Broadway Theatre
August 9, 2026	São Paulo	Brazil	Audio - São Paulo
August 14, 2026	Los Angeles	United States	Orpheum Theatre
August 16, 2026	San Francisco	United States	Palace of Fine Arts
August 20, 2026	Chicago	United States	Copernicus Center
August 22, 2026	New York City	United States	Palladium Times Square
September 6, 2026	Singapore		The Theatre at Mediacorp
September 18, 2026	Manila	Philippines	The Theatre at Solaire
September 20–21, 2026	Osaka	Japan	Cool Japan Park Osaka WW Hall
September 27, 2026	Ho Chi Minh City	Vietnam	Nguyen Du Gymnasium

=== Concert participations and fanmeetings ===
Title	Date	Location	Notes	Ref.
GMMTV Musicon in Tokyo	July 29–30, 2023	Tokyo, Japan		
Gemini Fourth My Turn Concert	August 7, 2023	Impact Arena, Thailand	Guest artist	
GMMTV Musicon in Jakarta	December 16, 2023	Jakarta, Indonesia		
GMMTV Starlympic 2023	December 23, 2023	Impact Arena, Thailand		
BABII 24/7 Concert	April 20, 2024	Union Hall, Thailand	Guest artist	
GMMTV Fan-Event In Tokyo	May 14–16, 2024	Tokyo, Japan		
GMMTV Musicon in Hong Kong	August 18, 2024	Hong Kong, China		
GMMTV Musicon in Cambodia	October 5, 2024	Phnom Penh, Cambodia		
ThamePo: The First Beat	December 13, 2024	SF World Cinema, Thailand		
GMMTV Starlympics 2024	December 21, 2024	Impact Arena, Thailand		
GMMTV Musicon in Nanning	January 5, 2025	Nanning, China		
ThamePo Our Last Beat Fan Party	March 7, 2025	MCC Hall, Thailand		
GMMTV RISER MUSIC T-Pop Showcase in Tokyo	May 8–9, 2025	Tokyo, Japan		
Love Out Loud Fan Fest 2025: Lovemosphere	May 17–18, 2025	Impact Arena, Thailand	Guest artist	
GMMTV Musicon in Japan	July 26–27, 2025	Tokyo, Japan		
Riser Concert: The First Rise	February 13–15, 2026	Impact Arena, Thailand		

=== Music festivals ===
Title	Date	Location	Notes	Ref.
GOTCHA POP Concert	September 9, 2023	Union Hall, Thailand		
T-POP Concert Fest 2	October 14, 2023	Queen Sirikit National Convention Center, Thailand		
OCTOPOP 2023	October 22, 2023	Thunder Dome, Thailand		
13th Big Mountain Music Festival	December 10, 2023	The Ocean Khao Yai, Thailand		
Siam Music Fest 2023	December 17, 2023	Siam Square, Thailand		
Flex 104.5 x DV8 TGIF "THANKS GOD IT'S FANDAY"	March 2, 2024	Chulalongkorn University Centenary Park, Thailand	Guest artist of Perawat Sangpotirat	
FWD Music Live Fest 3	April 21, 2024	Central World Forecourt, Thailand		
ฝั่งธนเฟส 2	May 4, 2024	Sermsuk Warehouse, Thailand		
Fansland Music Festival	May 4, 2024	IMPACT Exhibition Hall 5-8, Thailand		
Banyak Bagus Festival	May 5, 2024	Kuala Lumpur, Malaysia		
GOTCHA POP 2 Concert	May 11, 2024	BITEC Bangna Hall 101-103, Thailand		
Bondbond Music Mania	June 30, 2024	Union Hall, Thailand		
MIXEDPOP Bangkok 2024	July 7, 2024	BITEC Live, Thailand		
MeroMero Fest 2024	July 30–31, 2024	Nagoya, Japan		
T-POP(mart) Concert Fest 3	October 13, 2024	Queen Sirikit National Convention Center, Thailand		
Siam Halloween 2024	October 26, 2024	Siam Square Block K, Thailand		
Monster Music Festival 2024	November 3, 2024	Queen Sirikit National Convention Center, Thailand		
Love Fest Thailand 2024 "Music on the hill"	November 16, 2024	Thong Somboon Club, Thailand		
CAT EXPO 11	November 17, 2024	Wonder World Fun Park, Thailand		
เชียงใหญ่เฟส 5	December 1, 2024	Royal Train Garden Resort, Thailand		
14th Big Mountain Music Festival	December 8, 2024	The Ocean Khao Yai, Thailand		
Siam Music Fest 2024	December 15, 2024	Siam Square Soi 2, Thailand		
Pattaya Music Festival "Sound on the Sand"	March 21, 2025	Lan Pho Public Park, Thailand		
Flex Fanday EP.2	March 22, 2025	Union Hall, Thailand		
COOL Summer Fest # Hot on Fire	March 29, 2025	COOL SUMMER BEACH, Thailand		
GOTCHA POP 3 Concert	May 24, 2025	Queen Sirikit National Convention Center, Thailand		
Move On Concert 2025	June 29, 2025	UOB LIVE, Thailand		
MIXEDPOP Music Festival Bangkok 2025	July 6, 2025	BITEC Live, Thailand		
Monster Music Festival 2025	November 2, 2025	Queen Sirikit National Convention Center, Thailand		
Bangsaen Fest 2025	November 16, 2025	Bangsaen Heritage Convention Center, Thailand		
Beach Boys Concert 2025	November 22, 2025	Sea Sand Sun Hua Hin Resort, Thailand		
15th Big Mountain Music Festival	December 6, 2025	The Ocean Khao Yai, Thailand		

== Awards and nominations ==
Year	Award	Category	Work	Result	Ref.
2024	The Guitar Mag Award 2024	Best Boy Band of The Year		Nominated	
2024	TOTY Music Awards 2023/24	Best Male Group	"May I?"	Nominated	
2024	TOTY Music Awards 2023/24	Best Performance		Nominated	
2024	20th Kom Chad Luek Awards	Best New Artist (Thai pop music genre)	"No Worries"	Won	
2024	20th Kom Chad Luek Awards	Best T-POP Artist (Thai pop music genre)	"No Worries"	Nominated	
2024	FEED Y AWARDS 2024	Popular Thai pop artists		Won	
2024	BreakTudo Awards 2024	Música de Novo Artista Internacional	"Charm" by LYKN x Joong, Pond	Nominated	
2024	29th Asian Television Awards	Best Music Video	"Charm" by LYKN x Joong, Pond	Nominated	
2025	1st Thailand Music Awards: Thai POPs Awards 2024	Main prize: Best Artist: Male Duo/Group		Won	
2025	Sanook Awards 2024	T-POP Artist of the Year		Nominated	
2025	The Viral Hits Awards 2024	Best Male Group Artist of the Year		Nominated	
2025	The Guitar Mag Awards 2025	Best Boy Group of the Year		Won	
2025	The Guitar Mag Awards 2025	Popular Vote		Nominated	
2025	TOTY Music Awards	POPular Male Group of the Year	"Trust Me"	Nominated	
2025	HOWE Awards 2025	Hottest Artist Award		Won	
2025	30th Asian Television Awards	Best Music Video	"Sugoi"	Won	
2026	TOTY Music Awards	POPular Male Group of the Year	"First Sight"	Nominated	
2026	TOTY Music Awards	POPular Group Performance of the Year	"First Sight"	Nominated	
2026	22nd Kom Chad Luek Awards	Best Male T-POP Artist	"First Sight"	Won	
2026	MChoice & Mint Awards 2026	Phenomenon of the Year	LYKN Dusk & Dawn World Tour 2026	Won	
2026	31st Asian Television Awards	Best Music Video	"Foreground"	Nominated	
