= ThamePo: Heart That Skips a Beat =

2024–25 Thai television series

- Promotional poster
- Genre: Romantic drama; Boys' Love
- Directed by: Aticha Tanthanawigrai
- Starring: Jakrapatr Kaewpanpong; Supha Sangaworawong; Thanat Danjesda; Pichetpong Chiradatesakunvong; Rapeepong Supatineekitdecha; Chayatorn Trairattanapradit
- Opening theme: "ไม่ใช่บังเอิญ (Destined)" by Tui Chayatorn
- Country of origin: Thailand
- Original language: Thai
- No. of seasons: 1
- No. of episodes: 13

Production
- Running time: 45–60 minutes
- Production companies: GMMTV; Parbdee Taweesuk

Original release
- Network: GMM 25; Netflix; YouTube
- Release: 13 December 2024 – 7 March 2025

ThamePo: Heart That Skips a Beat (Thai: เธมโป้) is a 2024 Thai television series, starring Jakrapatr Kaewpanpong (William) and Supha Sangaworawong (Est), alongside the rest of Thai boy band LYKN, Thanat Danjesda (Nut), Pichetpong Chiradatesakunvong (Hong), Rapeepong Supatineekitdecha (Lego), and Chayatorn Trairattanapradit (Tui). Directed by Aticha Tanthanawigrai and co-produced by GMMTV and Parbdee Taweesuk, this series was announced at "GMMTV 2024: UP&ABOVE Part 2" event on 23 April 2024. The series premiered on GMM 25 and Netflix on 13 December 2024, airing Fridays at 20:30 ICT and 21:30 ICT, respectively. The series concluded on 7 March 2025.

== Synopsis ==
When Po (Supha Sangaworawong) is assigned to document the final concert of the boy band MARS (LYKN) before their disbandment, he unintentionally becomes the closest confidante of the group's leader, Thame (Jakrapatr Kaewpanpong). Thame is about to debut in South Korea, leaving the other members, Dylan (Pichetpong Chiradatesakunvong), Jun (Thanat Danjesda), Nano (Rapeepong Supatineekitdecha), and Pepper (Chayatorn Trairattanapradit), who are still caught in misunderstandings.

== Cast and characters ==
=== Main ===
- Jakrapatr Kaewpanpong (William) as Teema Kanjanakittkul (Thame)
- Supha Sangaworawong (Est) as Pawat Nuenganan (Po)
- Thanat Danjesda (Nut) as Junn Tangsakultham (Jun)
- Pichetpong Chiradatesakunvong (Hong) as Dylan Zhou
- Rapeepong Supatineekitdecha (Lego) as Napassakorn Jatutaweechot (Nano / No)
- Chayatorn Trairattanapradit (Tui) as Pavee Warisphol (Pepper / Per)

=== Supporting ===
- Rutricha Phapakithi (Ciize) as Kamolrat Kopkasem (Baifern)
- Samantha Melanie Coates (Sammy) as Ming
- Sattabut Laedeke (Drake) as Tae
- Leo Saussay as Mick (MARS's manager)
- Phanuroj Chalermkijporntavee (Pepper) as Earn (Po's ex-boyfriend)
- Kittiphong Dumaviphat (Kroi) as Joei (Po's ex-boss)
- Kullanat Kulpreeyawat (Namfon) as Pemika (Oner Entertainment's CEO)
- Yongwaree Anilbol (Fah) as Gam (Pepper's girlfriend)

=== Guest ===
- Sakdipath Agrasuta (Phut) as sandwich maker (Ep. 1–2)
- Archen Aydin (Joong) as Ice (Oner's soloist) (Ep. 2 & 7–10)
- Suvijak Piyanopharoj (Keen) as Mok Diloksakulkan (Moo)
- Napat Patcharachavalit (Aun) as Naphat Chaowalitkul (Potae)
- Peerakan Teawsuwan (Ashi) as Phira Thiansuwan (Payos)
- Thanawin Teeraphosukarn (Louis) as Jang
- Weerayut Chansook (Arm) as Pop Stage MC
- Phatchatorn Thanawat (Ployphach) as Pop Stage MC
- Ploynira Hiruntaveesin (Kapook) as Music Max MC
- Ratthanant Janyajirawong as Wednesday Night Live MC

== Soundtrack ==
No.	Title	Artist	Ref.
1	"ไม่ใช่บังเอิญ (Destined)"	Tui Chayatorn	
2	"All I Need"	LYKN	
3	"I Know You Want Me"	LYKN	
4	"5CM"	William Jakrapatr	
5	"ไม่อยากเป็นรักแรก (Your Last)"	Est Supha	
6	"จีบได้มั้ย (Would You Mind?)"	LYKN	
7	"จีบได้มั้ย (Would You Mind?)"	Joong Archen	
8	"หูดับ (Who Says)"	LYKN	
9	"ระหว่างทาง (Good Time)" (Cover) (Original by Bright and Thanaerng)	William Jakrapatr, Est Supha	
10	"Fly High"	LYKN	

== Awards and nominations ==
Year	Award	Category	Recipient(s)	Result	Ref.
2025	ContentAsia Awards 2025	Best LGBTQ+ Programme Made in Asia	Thamepo Heart That Skips A Beat	Won	
2025	ContentAsia Awards 2025	Best Original Song Created in Asia for an Asian TV Series/Programme or Movie	"5CM"	Nominated	

== Accolades ==
=== Listicles ===
Year-end lists for ThamePo: Heart That Skips a Beat
Critic/Publication	List	Rank	Ref.
Teen Vogue	13 Best BL Dramas of 2025	Included	
