= Union Mall =

Shopping mall in Bangkok, Thailand

- ยูเนี่ยน มอลล์
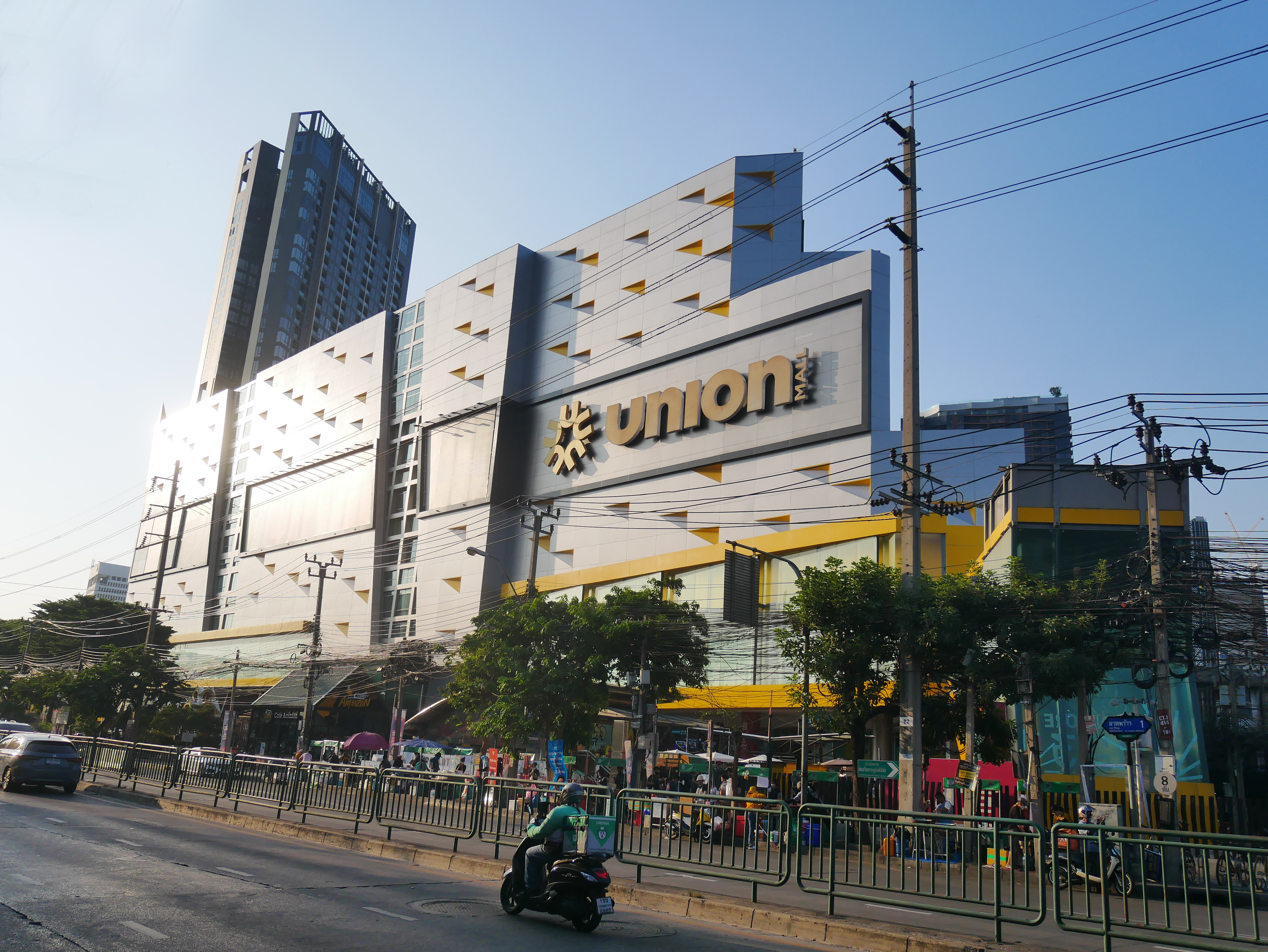
- Location: Chatuchak, Bangkok
- Coordinates: 13.813587°N 100.561841°E
- Opened: February 2006
- Num. of stores: 1240
- Floor area: 150,000 square metres (1,600,000 sq ft)
- Floors: 8
- Parking: 2000

Union Mall is a shopping mall in the north of Bangkok, at the Lat Phrao junction. The mall opened in February 2006. It has eight floors with a total of 150,000 square metres (1,600,000 sq ft) of space. It houses some 1,240 booths and shops and entertainment services.

== See also ==
- List of shopping malls in Bangkok
- List of shopping malls in Thailand
- List of largest shopping malls in Thailand
