= List of GMMTV events =

Wikimedia list article

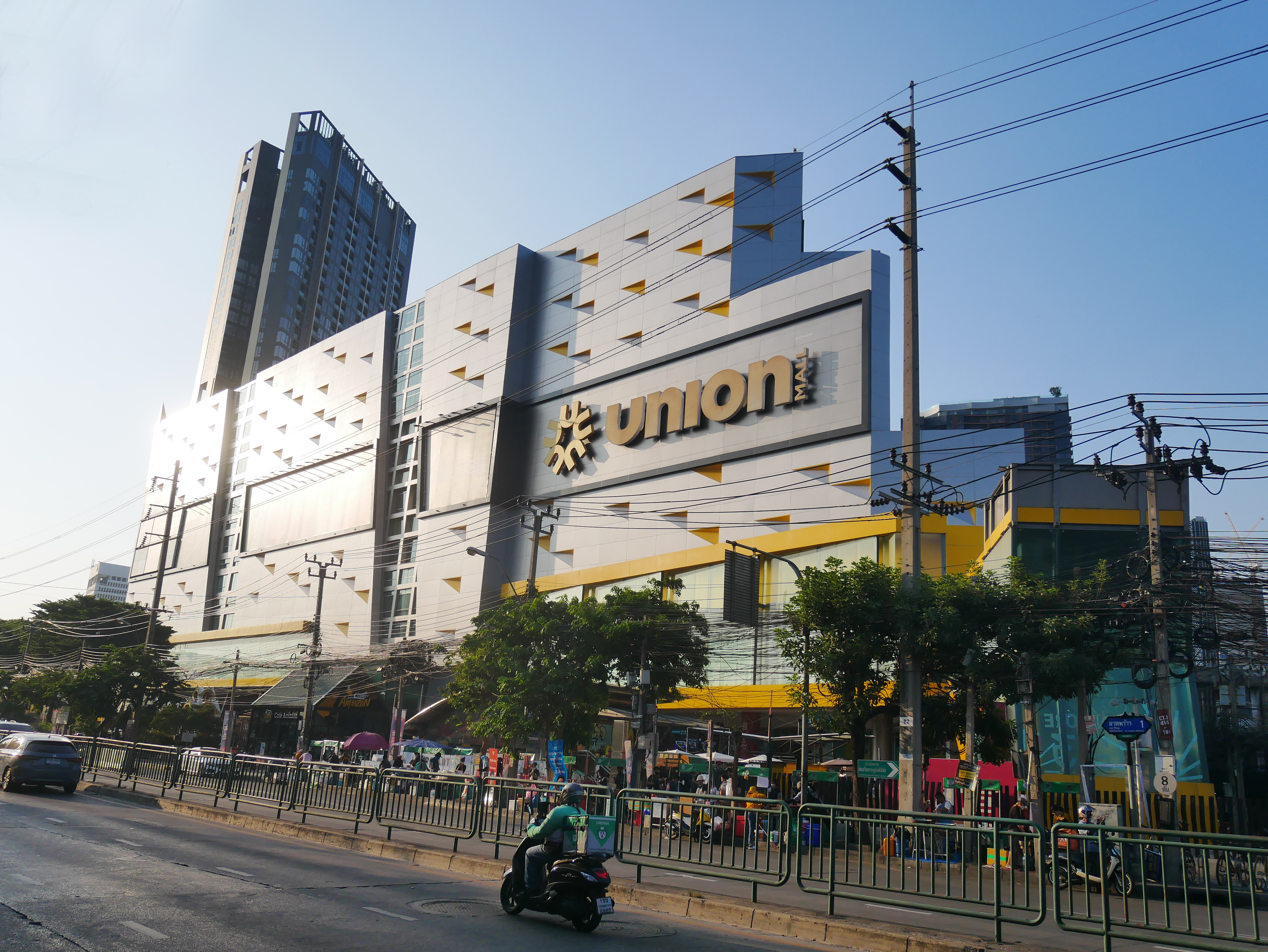
Many GMMTV events have taken place at Union Mall in Bangkok, Thailand.

== Overview ==
GMMTV (Thai:จีเอ็มเอ็มทีวี) is a Thai television production company and talent management agency.

== Events ==
=== Thailand ===
Events held in Thailand are directly organized by GMMTV and/or sponsors, including press conferences, concerts, exhibitions and fan meeting events.

| Year | Title | Date(s) | Venue | Ref. |
|---|---|---|---|---|
| 2012 | Five Live Enter10 Concert | September 29, 2012 | Event Hall 106, BITEC Bangna | |
| 2013 | Toey Fair Festival Carnival 2013 | November 30, 2013 | Island Hall, Fashion Island | |
| 2014 | Toey Fair Festival Carnival 2014 | November 22, 2014 | Muangthai GMM Live House, CentralWorld | |
| 2015 | Toey Fair Festival Carnival 2015 | November 29, 2015 | Thunder Dome, Muang Thong Thani | |
| 2017 | Meet Greet Eat ว้าก with SOTUS The Series | January 14, 2017 | Scala Cinema, Siam Square | |
| 2017 | Toey Fair Festival Carnival 2016: Toey Fair Mae Krong Muang | February 4, 2017 | Thunder Dome, Muang Thong Thani | |
| 2017 | GMMTV 6 Natures+ | March 2, 2017 | Show DC | |
| 2017 | Y I Love U Fan Party | September 3, 2017 | Thunder Dome, Muang Thong Thani | |
| 2017 | SOTUS S Nation Y Fan Meeting | December 16, 2017 | Kad Theater, Kad Suan Kaew | |
| 2017 | SOTUS S Nation Y Fan Meeting | December 23, 2017 | Terminal Hall, Terminal 21 | |
| 2018 | SOTUS S Nation Y Fan Meeting | January 13, 2018 | BCC Hall, CentralPlaza Lardprao | |
| 2018 | SOTUS S Nation Y Fan Meeting | January 27, 2018 | HATYAI HALL, CentralFestival Hatyai | |
| 2018 | GMMTV Series X | February 1, 2018 | GMM Live House, CentralWorld | |
| 2018 | SOTUS The Memories Live on Stage | May 5, 2018 | Thunder Dome, Muang Thong Thani | |
| 2018 | GMMTV Series 2019 Wonder Thirteen | November 5, 2018 | GMM Live House, CentralWorld | |
| 2018 | Lazada Presents KristSingto Fan Meeting | November 29, 2018 | Srinakharinwirot University | |
| 2018 | Lazada Presents OffGun Fan Meeting | December 4, 2018 | GMM Grammy Place | |
| 2019 | Y I Love U Fan Party 2019 | January 26–27, 2019 | Thunder Dome, Muang Thong Thani | |
| 2019 | Peraya Party: Krist & Singto 1st Fan Meeting in Thailand | July 6–7, 2019 | Chaengwatthana Hall, CentralPlaza Chaengwattana | |
| 2019 | Funtastic Babii: Off - Gun 1st Fan Meeting in Thailand | September 21, 2019 | Chaengwatthana Hall, CentralPlaza Chaengwattana | |
| 2019 | GMMTV 2020 New & Next | October 15, 2019 | GMM Live House, CentralWorld | |
| 2019 | Thailand School Star 2019 | November 23, 2019 | Samyan Mitrtown Hall, Samyan Mitrtown | |
| 2020 | Kun-Gu 2gether Live On Stage | October 17–18, 2020 | Union Hall, Union Mall | |
| 2020 | GMMTV 2021 The New Decade Begins | December 3, 2020 | Union Hall, Union Mall | |
| 2021 | 2gether The Movie First Premiere | November 10, 2021 | Siam Pavalai Royal Grand Theater, Siam Paragon | |
| 2021 | GMMTV 2022 Borderless | December 1, 2021 | Union Hall, Union Mall | |
| 2022 | Bad Buddy Illumination | March 1–22, 2022 | House of Illumination, CentralWorld | |
| 2022 | Star In My Mind Final EP | May 27, 2022 | Siam Pavalai Royal Grand Theater, Siam Paragon | |
| 2022 | Polca The Journey: Tay & New 1st Fan Meeting in Thailand | June 25, 2022 | Changwattana Hall, Central Chaengwattana | |
| 2022 | Shooting Star Concert | July 23, 2022 | Union Hall, Union Mall | |
| 2022 | O-N Friend City Ohm - Nanon 1st Fan Meeting in Thailand | August 6, 2022 | Union Hall, Union Mall | |
| 2022 | Love Out Loud Fan Fest 2022 | August 20, 2022 | Impact Arena, Muang Thong Thani | |
| 2022 | Vice Versa Final EP Fan Meeting | October 1, 2022 | MasterCard Cinema, SF World Cinema, CentralWorld | |
| 2022 | Feel Fan Fun Camping Concert | October 15, 2022 | Union Hall, Union Mall | |
| 2022 | The Eclipse Final EP Fan Meeting | October 28, 2022 | MasterCard Cinema, SF World Cinema, CentralWorld | |
| 2022 | 7 Xian Concert | November 19, 2022 | CentralWorld Live, CentralWorld | |
| 2022 | GMMTV 2023 Diversely Yours, | November 22, 2022 | Union Hall, Union Mall | |
| 2022 | Side by Side Bright Win Concert | December 24, 2022 | Impact Arena, Muang Thong Thani | |
| 2023 | Opening Night Moonlight Chicken | February 8, 2023 | Ballroom Hall 1–2, Queen Sirikit National Convention Center | |
| 2023 | Never Let Me Go Final EP. Fan Meeting | February 28, 2023 | True Icon Hall, Iconsiam | |
| 2023 | Moonlight Chicken Final EP. Fan Meeting | March 2, 2023 | True Icon Hall, Iconsiam | |
| 2023 | My School President Prom Night Live On Stage | March 18–19, 2023 | Union Hall, Union Mall | |
| 2023 | My Precious First Premiere | April 25, 2023 | Siam Pavalai Royal Grand Theater, Siam Paragon | |
| 2023 | My Precious On Tour | April 27, 2023 | MasterCard Cinema, SF World Cinema, CentralWorld | |
| 2023 | My Precious On Tour | April 30, 2023 | SF Cinema, Central Chonburi | |
| 2023 | My Precious On Tour | April 30, 2023 | SF Cinema, Terminal 21 Pattaya | |
| 2023 | My Precious On Tour | May 6, 2023 | SF Cinema, CentralPlaza Khon Kaen | |
| 2023 | My Precious On Tour | May 7, 2023 | SFX Cinema, Maya Chiang Mai | |
| 2023 | A Boss and a Babe Final EP. Fan Meeting | May 19, 2023 | Siam Pavalai Royal Grand Theater, Siam Paragon | |
| 2023 | Beluca Fourtiverse Concert | May 20, 2023 | Royal Paragon Hall, Siam Paragon | |
| 2023 | My Precious Finale | June 13, 2023 | MasterCard Cinema, SF World Cinema, CentralWorld | |
| 2023 | Love Out Loud Fan Fest 2023: Lovolution | June 24–25, 2023 | Royal Paragon Hall, Siam Paragon | |
| 2023 | Before Enigma | July 14, 2023 | Lido Connect | |
| 2023 | Be My Favorite Final EP. Fan Meeting | August 11, 2023 | MasterCard Cinema, SF World Cinema, CentralWorld | |
| 2023 | GeminiFourth My Turn Concert | August 26–27, 2023 | Impact Arena, Muang Thong Thani | |
| 2023 | GMMTV Fanday in Bangkok | September 22–24, 2023 | Union Hall, Union Mall | |
| 2023 | GMMTV 2024 Up & Above Part 1 | October 17, 2023 | Union Hall, Union Mall | |
| 2023 | The Krist Elements Concert | October 21–22, 2023 | Union Hall, Union Mall | |
| 2023 | Only Friends Final EP. Fan Meeting | October 28, 2023 | Siam Pavalai Royal Grand Theater, Siam Paragon | |
| 2023 | Dangerous Romance Final EP. Fan Meeting | November 3, 2023 | Ultra Arena, Show DC | |
| 2023 | GMMTV Starlympics 2023 | December 23, 2023 (Note: originally scheduled for July 22, 2023 at Thunder Dome, Muang Thong Thani; postponed due to changing venue) | Impact Arena, Muang Thong Thani | |
| 2024 | Last Twilight Final EP. Fan Meeting | January 26, 2024 | Siam Pavalai Royal Grand Theater, Siam Paragon | |
| 2024 | Win Holidate Fancon Presented by Lazada | February 17, 2024 | Bangkok International Trade and Exhibition Centre | |
| 2024 | Nanon born to BEO Concert | March 23, 2024 | Thunder Dome, Muang Thong Thani | |
| 2024 | Last Twilight New Dawn Live On Stage | March 30, 2024 | Union Hall, Union Mall | |
| 2024 | Babii 24/7 Concert | April 20, 2024 | Union Hall, Union Mall | |
| 2024 | GMMTV 2024 Up & Above Part 2 | April 23, 2024 | Union Hall, Union Mall | |
| 2024 | Polca Time Traveling Concert | April 27, 2024 | Union Hall, Union Mall | |
| 2024 | Love Out Loud Fan Fest 2024: The Love Pirates | May 18–19, 2024 (Note: originally scheduled for May 24, 2024) | Impact Arena, Muang Thong Thani | |
| 2024 | 23.5 Lovtitude Final EP. Fan Meeting | May 24, 2024 | Siam Pavalai Royal Grand Theater, Siam Paragon | |
| 2024 | Peraya Party Begin Again | June 15, 2024 | Union Hall, Union Mall | |
| 2024 | Only Boo! Final EP. Fan Meeting | June 23, 2024 | Earthlab Cinema by Dr. CBD, SF World Cinema, CentralWorld | |
| 2024 | Bouncy Boun Concert | July 13, 2024 | Thunder Dome, Muang Thong Thani | |
| 2024 | Wandee Goodday Final EP. Fan Meeting | July 20, 2024 | Earthlab Cinema by Dr. CBD, SF World Cinema, CentralWorld | |
| 2024 | We Are Forever Fancon | August 16–17, 2024 | True Icon Hall, Iconsiam | |
| 2024 | Peaceful Property Open House | August 28, 2024 | Siam Pavalai Royal Grand Theater, Siam Paragon | |
| 2024 | GeminiFourth Run The World Concert | August 31 – September 1, 2024 | Impact Arena, Muang Thong Thani | |
| 2024 | The Trainee Final EP. Fan Meeting | September 15, 2024 | Siam Pavalai Royal Grand Theater, Siam Paragon | |
| 2024 | LYKN Unleashed Concert | September 21, 2024 | Thunder Dome, Muang Thong Thani | |
| 2024 | Perfect 10 Liners First Date | October 27, 2024 | Siam Pavalai Royal Grand Theater, Siam Paragon | |
| 2024 | The Heart Killers: Love at First Kill | November 20, 2024 | Siam Pavalai Royal Grand Theater, Siam Paragon | |
| 2024 | Kidnap Final EP. Fan Meeting | November 22, 2024 | SF World Cinema, CentralWorld | |
| 2024 | GMMTV2025 Riding The Wave | November 26, 2024 | Union Hall, Union Mall | |
| 2024 | GMMTV Fanday in Bangkok 2024 | November 30 – December 1, 2024 | Union Hall, Union Mall | |
| 2024 | High School Frenemy Final EP. Fan Meeting | December 3, 2024 | Siam Pavalai Royal Grand Theater, Siam Paragon | |
| 2024 | ThamePo : The First Beat | December 13, 2024 | SF World Cinema, CentralWorld | |
| 2024 | GMMTV Starlympics 2024 | December 21, 2024 | Impact Arena, Muang Thong Thani | |
| 2025 | Pluto Final EP. Fan Meeting | January 4, 2025 | Siam Pavalai Royal Grand Theater, Siam Paragon | |
| 2025 | Ossan's Love : First-Eye-View | January 6, 2025 | SF World Cinema, CentralWorld | |
| 2025 | Perfect 10 Liners Mid Term | January 26, 2025 | Siam Pavalai Royal Grand Theater, Siam Paragon | |
| 2025 | The Heart Killers: Never Back Down Final EP. Fan Party | February 12, 2025 | MCC Hall, The Mall Lifestore Ngamwongwan | |
| 2025 | Sky-Nani Frienomenon Fancon | February 15–16, 2025 | Union Hall, Union Mall | |
| 2025 | ThamePo Our Last Beat Fan Party | March 7, 2025 | MCC Hall, The Mall Lifestore Bangkapi | |
| 2025 | NamtanFilm Princess's Tale Fan Meeting | March 8–9, 2025 | MCC Hall, The Mall Lifestore Bangkapi | |
| 2025 | PEBACA What A Concert | March 22, 2025 | Thunder Dome, Muang Thong Thani | |
| 2025 | Ossan's Love Final EP. Fan Meeting | March 24, 2025 | Siam Pavalai Royal Grand Theater, Siam Paragon | |
| 2025 | Leap Day : First Screening | April 1, 2025 | SF World Cinema, CentralWorld | |
| 2025 | Us Final EP. Fan Meeting | April 5, 2025 | Siam Pavalai Royal Grand Theater, Siam Paragon | |
| 2025 | Perfect 10 Liners Bye Nior Fan Party | April 6, 2025 | MCC Hall, The Mall Lifestore Ngamwongwan | |
| 2025 | Perfect 10 Liners Bye Nior After Party | April 7, 2025 | MCC Hall, The Mall Lifestore Ngamwongwan | |
| 2025 | Love Out Loud Fan Fest 2025: Lovemosphere | May 17–18, 2025 | Impact Arena, Muang Thong Thani | |
| 2025 | The First Ex-Morning | May 22, 2025 | Siam Pavalai Royal Grand Theater, Siam Paragon | |
| 2025 | My Golden Blood Final EP. Fan Meeting | May 28, 2025 | Siam Pavalai Royal Grand Theater, Siam Paragon | |
| 2025 | Sweet Tooth, Good Dentist Final EP. Fan Meeting | June 6, 2025 | SF World Cinema, CentralWorld | |
| 2025 | Memoir Of Rati: The First Chapter | June 20, 2025 | Siam Pavalai Royal Grand Theater, Siam Paragon | |
| 2025 | Leap Day: Final Screening | June 24, 2025 | SF World Cinema, CentralWorld | |
| 2025 | Whale Store xoxo: First Come, First Love! | June 25, 2025 | SF World Cinema, CentralWorld | |
| 2025 | Blush Blossom Fan Fest 2025 | June 28–29, 2025 | Union Hall, Union Mall | |
| 2025 | Boys in love Final EP. Fan Meeting | July 6, 2025 | Siam Pavalai Royal Grand Theater, Siam Paragon | |
| 2025 | PerthSanta Time Stopper Fancon | July 19–20, 2025 | Union Hall, Union Mall | |
| 2025 | The Ex-Morning Final EP. Fan Meeting | July 24, 2025 | Siam Pavalai Royal Grand Theater, Siam Paragon | |
| 2025 | Enigma Black Stage First Screening | July 26, 2025 | SF World Cinema, CentralWorld | |
| 2025 | My Magic Prophecy Let The Magic Begin | July 27, 2025 | Siam Pavalai Royal Grand Theater, Siam Paragon | |
| 2025 | WilliamEst We Magnetic Fancon | August 9–10, 2025 | Union Hall, Union Mall | |
| 2025 | JuniorMark Shine Rise Fancon | August 11–12, 2025 | Union Hall, Union Mall | |
| 2025 | Revamp: The Undead Story First Premiere | August 23, 2025 | Siam Pavalai Royal Grand Theater, Siam Paragon | |
| 2025 | Whale Store xoxo Final EP. Fan Meeting | August 27, 2025 | Siam Pavalai Royal Grand Theater, Siam Paragon | |
| 2025 | GeminiFourth A.W.A.K.E Concert | August 30–31, 2025 | Impact Arena, Muang Thong Thani | |
| 2025 | Memoir of Rati Final EP. Fan Meeting | September 5, 2025 | Siam Pavalai Royal Grand Theater, Siam Paragon | |
| 2025 | That Summer: The First Sunshine | September 19, 2025 | Siam Pavalai Royal Grand Theater, Siam Paragon | |
| 2025 | JossGawin Invincible Fancon | September 27, 2025 | MCC Hall, The Mall Lifestore Bangkapi | |
| 2025 | My Magic Prophecy: Lucky in Love Fan Party | September 28, 2025 | MCC Hall, The Mall Lifestore Bangkapi | |
| 2025 | My Magic Prophecy: Lucky in Love After Party | September 29, 2025 | MCC Hall, The Mall Lifestore Bangkapi | |
| 2025 | Head 2 Head: The First Round | October 18, 2025 | SF World Cinema, Centralworld | |
| 2025 | LYKN Dusk & Dawn Concert | October 18–19, 2025 | Impact Arena, Muang Thong Thani | |
| 2025 | Revamp The Undead Story Final EP. Fan Meeting | October 25, 2025 | Siam Pavalai Royal Grand Theater, Siam Paragon | |
| 2025 | PondPhuwin Rendezvous Fancon | October 31–November 2, 2025 | Union Hall, Union Mall | |
| 2025 | That Summer Final EP. Fan Meeting | November 21, 2025 | Siam Pavalai Royal Grand Theater, Siam Paragon | |
| 2025 | Burnout Syndrome: Begins | November 26, 2025 | Siam Pavalai Royal Grand Theater, Siam Paragon | |
| 2025 | JimmySea Dreamscape Fancon | November 29–30, 2025 | Union Hall, Union Mall | |
| 2025 | Nanon SEVEN Listening & Birthday Party | December 18, 2025 | Iconsiam Hall | |
| 2025 | Dare You to Death: The Case Opens | December 18, 2025 | Siam Pavalai Royal Grand Theater, Siam Paragon | |
| 2025 | Melody of Secrets: The Third Tune | December 19, 2025 (Note: originally scheduled for December 5, 2025 under the name "Melody of Secrets: The First Note") | Siam Pavalai Royal Grand Theater, Siam Paragon | |
| 2025 | GMMTV Starlympics 2025 | December 20, 2025 | Impact Arena, Muang Thong Thani | |
| 2026 | Head 2 Head Final EP. Fan Meeting | January 11, 2026 | Siam Pavalai Royal Grand Theater, Siam Paragon | |
| 2026 | Me and Thee: Fan Party | January 17, 2026 | Union Hall, Union Mall | |
| 2026 | Me and Thee: After Party | January 18, 2026 | Union Hall, Union Mall | |
| 2026 | My Romance Scammer: Love at First Scam | February 1, 2026 | Siam Pavalai Royal Grand Theater, Siam Paragon | |
| 2026 | Burnout Syndrome Final EP. Fan Meeting | February 4, 2026 | Siam Pavalai Royal Grand Theater, Siam Paragon | |
| 2026 | Melody of Secrets Final EP. Fan Meeting | February 13, 2026 | Siam Pavalai Royal Grand Theater, Siam Paragon | |
| 2026 | Dare You to Death Final EP. Fan Meeting | February 26, 2026 | Centralworld Pulse Hall, Centralworld | |
| 2026 | Only Friends: Dream On The Play Begins | February 27, 2026 | Centralworld Pulse Hall, Centralworld | |
| 2026 | Polca Fam Meeting | February 28–March 1, 2026 | Union Hall, Union Mall | |
| 2026 | Toey Fair Festival Carnival 2026: Toey Fair Phuak Kae Pen Ngai Mang | March 3, 2026 | Union Hall, Union Mall | |
| 2026 | EmiBonnie Love Session Concert | March 7–8, 2026 | MCC Hall, The Mall Lifestore Bangkapi | |
| 2026 | Girl Rules: The 1st Rule | March 9, 2026 | MCC Hall, The Mall Lifestore Bangkapi | |
| 2026 | Love You Teacher: Lesson One | March 14, 2026 | Bhiraj Hall | |
| 2026 | ForceBook Funtopia Fancon | April 3–4, 2026 | Union Hall, Union Mall | |
| 2026 | JoongDunk Eyes on You Fancon | April 5–6, 2026 | Union Hall, Union Mall | |
| 2026 | My Romance Scammer Final EP. Fan Meeting | April 19, 2026 | MCC Hall, The Mall Lifestore Bangkae | |
| 2026 | Wu: The Fate Begins | April 5, 2026 | Centralword Pulse Hall, Centralworld | |
| 2026 | When Oranges Fall: First Fall, First Love | April 13, 2026 | Siam Pavalai Royal Grand Theater, Siam Paragon | |
| 2026 | SurfJava Fan Meeting in Thailand | April 25, 2026 | MCC Hall, The Mall Lifestore Bangkae | |
| 2026 | SeaKeen Fan Meeting in Thailand | April 26, 2026 | MCC Hall, The Mall Lifestore Bangkae | |
| 2026 | Enemies with Benefits: Fight at First Sight | May 3, 2026 | Siam Pavalai Royal Grand Theater, Siam Paragon | |
| 2026 | Only Friends: Dream On Final EP. Fan Meeting | May 15, 2026 | MCC Hall, The Mall Lifestore Bangkapi | |
| 2026 | Love You Teacher Final EP. Fan Meeting | May 16, 2026 | MCC Hall, The Mall Lifestore Bangkapi | |
| 2026 | Love Out Loud Fan Fest 2026: Heart Race | May 22–24, 2026 | Impact Arena, Muang Thong Thani | |
| 2026 | A Dog and a Plane: Love at First Flight | May 29, 2026 | Iconsiam Hall | |
| 2026 | Ticket to Heaven: The Premiere | May 30, 2026 | Iconsiam Hall | |
| 2026 | Girl Rules Final EP. Fan Meeting | June 1, 2026 | Iconsiam Hall | |
| 2026 | Blush Blossom Fan Fest 2026: Midnight Bloom | June 13–14, 2026 | BITEC LIVE | |
| 2026 | Wu Destiny: Fan Party | June 30, 2026 | MCC Hall, The Mall Lifestore Bangkapi | |
| 2026 | Wu Destiny: After Party | July 1, 2026 | MCC Hall, The Mall Lifestore Bangkapi | |
| 2026 | Ticket to Heaven: Fan Party | July 4, 2026 | MCC Hall, The Mall Lifestore Bangkapi | |
| 2026 | Enemies with Benefits Final EP. Fan Meeting | July 5, 2026 | MCC Hall, The Mall Lifestore Bangkapi | |
| 2026 | Mr. Kill: The First Page | July 7, 2026 | MCC Hall, The Mall Lifestore Bangkapi | |
| 2026 | Peach and Me: Premiere Night | July 11, 2026 | Union Hall, Union Mall | |
| 2026 | PerthSanta Devil's Kiss Concert | July 18–19, 2026 | Paragon Hall | |
| 2026 | Feel Fun Fan Party Concert | July 25–26, 2026 | Union Hall, Union Mall | |
| 2026 | Match Point: The First Match | July 26, 2026 | SF World Cinema, Centralworld | |
| 2026 | JossGawin Heat & Beat Concert | July 28, 2026 | Union Hall, Union Mall | |
| 2026 | When Oranges Fall Final EP. Fan Meeting | July 29, 2026 | Centralworld Pulse Hall, Centralworld | |
| 2026 | A Dog and a Plane Final EP. Fan Meeting | July 31, 2026 | Centralworld Pulse Hall, Centralworld | |
| 2026 | Unlucky Bae: Meet & Mu Together | August 6, 2026 | SF World Cinema, Centralworld | |
| 2026 | JuniorMark Sunny Moon Concert | August 7–9, 2026 | BITEC LIVE | |
| 2026 | Moonshadow: Under the First Moon | August 12, 2026 | Centralworld Pulse Hall, Centralworld | |
| 2026 | Weirdo-101: The First Gravity | August 14, 2026 | Centralworld Pulse Hall, Centralworld | |
| 2026 | PondPhuwin Space Soul-dyssey Concert | August 21–23, 2026 | Impact Arena, Muang Thong Thani | |
| 2026 | You Maniac: Opening Night | August 29, 2026 | MCC Hall, The Mall Lifestore Bangkapi | |
| 2026 | SOTUS Teniversary Concert | August 29–30, 2026 | Union Hall, Union Mall | |
| 2026 | Gemini Art-Venture Concert | September 4–6, 2026 | BITEC LIVE | |
| 2026 | Mr. Kill Final EP. Fan Meeting | September 8, 2026 | Centralworld Pulse Hall, Centralworld | |
| 2026 | Sky-Nani S to the N Fancon | September 19–20, 2026 | Thunder Dome, Muang Thong Thani | |
| 2026 | Match Point: Message Box | September 29, 2026 | Union Hall, Union Mall | |
| 2026 | Unlucky Bae Final EP. Lucky To Meet You | October 8, 2026 | SF World Cinema, Centralworld | |
| 2026 | Good Boy: The First Restart | October 11, 2026 (Note: originally scheduled for October 4, 2026; postponed due to mass flooding in Bangkok) | Siam Pavalai Royal Grand Theater, Siam Paragon | |
| 2026 | Moonshadow: The Afterglow Fan Party | October 14, 2026 | Iconsiam Hall | |
| 2026 | Moonshadow: The Afterglow After Party | October 15, 2026 | Iconsiam Hall | |
| 2026 | Weirdo-101 Final EP. Fan Meeting | October 16, 2026 | Iconsiam Hall | |
| 2026 | Oh My Fourth Concert | October 16–18, 2026 | BITEC LIVE | |
| 2026 | Krist SILHOUETTES Listening & Birthday Party | October 20, 2026 | Iconsiam Hall | |
| 2026 | LYKN Reflexion Concert | October 23–25, 2026 | Impact Arena, Muang Thong Thani | |
| 2026 | Lovers & Gangsters: The Legend Begins | October 30, 2026 | Union Hall, Union Mall | |
| 2026 | You Maniac Final EP. Fan Meeting | October 31, 2026 | Union Hall, Union Mall | |
| 2026 | Scarlet Heart Ullavee: The Grand Premiere | November 3, 2026 | Union Hall, Union Mall | |
| 2026 | Oxytoxin: Love To Meet You | November 7, 2026 | SF World Cinema, Centralworld | |
| 2026 | Dew-Tee Secret Area Fancon | November 7–8, 2026 | Union Hall, Union Mall | |
| 2026 | NamtanFlim Glamorous Fancon | November 13–14, 2026 | Thunder Dome, Muang Thong Thani | |
| 2026 | MilkLove Whimsical House Fancon | November 15, 2026 | Thunder Dome, Muang Thong Thani | |
| 2026 | JanJingJing Bewitch You Fancon | November 21–22, 2026 | Thunder Dome, Muang Thong Thani | |
| 2026 | Gunshot: The First Shot | November 23, 2026 | SF World Cinema, Centralworld | |
| 2026 | GMMTV Starlympics 2026 | November 28, 2026 | Impact Arena, Muang Thong Thani | |
| 2026 | WilliamEst Reign Together Concert | December 5–7, 2026 | Impact Arena, Muang Thong Thani | |
| 2026 | JASP.ER Temptation Concert | December 18–20, 2026 | Impact Arena, Muang Thong Thani | |
| 2027 | AlmondProgress Fan Meeting in Thailand | January 23, 2027 | MCC Hall, The Mall Lifestore Bangkapi | |
| 2027 | PEBACA Legacy Fam Concert | January 30–31, 2027 | BITEC LIVE | |
| 2027 | Wonders of The World Fan Fest | March 2027 | TBA | |
| 2027 | JimmySea Concert | March 20–21, 2027 | Siam Pavalai Royal Grand Theater, Siam Paragon | |
| 2027 | EmiBonnie Concert | April 24–25, 2027 | Siam Pavalai Royal Grand Theater, Siam Paragon | |
| 2027 | GMMTV Character: Happy Runderland | November 2027 | TBA | |

==== Cancelled events ====
| Year | Title | Scheduled Date(s) | Venue | Ref. |
|---|---|---|---|---|
| 2026 | Match Point Final EP. Fan Meeting | September 27, 2026 | Siam Pavalai Royal Grand Theater, Siam Paragon | |

=== Overseas ===
Events held abroad are not directly organized by GMMTV but in cooperation with foreign corporations and organizers, including exhibitions and fan meeting events.

| Year | Title | Date(s) | Venue | Ref. |
|---|---|---|---|---|
| 2017 | KristSingto Fan Meeting in China 2017 | February 18, 2017 | Hangzhou Magic Theatre | |
| 2017 | 2017 at First Sight with Rookie Boys in Guangzhou | March 24, 2017 | Guangdong Performing Arts Center Theater | |
| 2017 | KristSingto Fan Meeting in Suzhou & Nanjing | April 22, 2017 | Suzhou Culture and Arts Centre | |
| 2017 | KristSingto Fan Meeting in Suzhou & Nanjing | April 23, 2017 | Nanjing Culture and Art Center | |
| 2017 | OffGun Korea First Fan Meeting | May 20, 2017 | Anyang Arts Center | |
| 2017 | KristSingto Fan Meeting in Shenzhen | June 16, 2017 | Shenzhen Poly Theater | |
| 2017 | KristSingto Fan Meeting in Hangzhou | June 17, 2017 | Hangzhou Grand Theater | |
| 2017 | EarthNew Fan Meeting in Guangzhou China | July 18, 2017 | Poly World Trade Center Expo | |
| 2017 | KristSingto, Off & New Fan Meeting in Chengdu | July 22, 2017 | Jincheng Art Palace | |
| 2017 | OffGun Fan Meeting in Taipei | August 12, 2017 | Liberty Square International Auditorium | |
| 2018 | Sotus S Hazing in Manila 2018 | January 20, 2018 | Pasig City Hall Complex | |
| 2018 | OffGun Live in Manila | February 10, 2018 | Teatrino Promenade, Greenhills Shopping Center | |
| 2018 | Sotus S Fan Meeting in Chengdu | March 17, 2018 | Zhenghuo Art Center | |
| 2018 | Sotus S Fan Meeting in Taipei | March 25, 2018 | ATT SHOW BOX, ATT 4 FUN | |
| 2018 | Sotus S Fan Meeting in Tianjin | March 31, 2018 | Tianjin Wuqing Theater | |
| 2018 | First Date with Push in Vietnam | May 19, 2018 | 272 Conference Center | |
| 2018 | EarthNew Fan Meeting in Taipei | June 23, 2018 | Clapper Studio, Syntrend Creative Park | |
| 2018 | KristSingto Fan Meeting in Singapore | July 1, 2018 | Kallang Theatre | |
| 2018 | KristSingto Fan Meeting in Korea | July 7, 2018 | Woonjung Green Campus | |
| 2018 | Sotus S Fan Meeting in Wuhan | July 14, 2018 | Wuhan Cultural Museum Center | |
| 2018 | KristSingto Fan Meeting in Hong Kong | July 21–22, 2018 | Music Zone, KITEC | |
| 2018 | Sotus S Fan Meeting in Wuxi | August 25, 2018 | HUALUXE Wuxi Taihu | |
| 2018 | Offgun Fun Night Live in Malaysia | September 1, 2018 | PJ Live Arts Centre | |
| 2018 | Sotus Encore Fan Meeting in Taipei | September 22, 2018 | Taipei International Convention Center | |
| 2018 | KristSingto Fan Meeting in Jakarta | November 17, 2018 | Upperroom Jakarta | |
| 2018 | KristSingto Fan Meeting in Yagon | December 2, 2018 | National Theatre of Yangon | |
| 2018 | KristSingto Fan Meeting in Japan | December 15, 2018 | EBiS 303 Event Hall | |
| 2018 | TayNew & Earth Fan Meeting in Manila | December 22, 2018 | TIU Theater | |
| 2019 | OffGun Fan Meeting in Shenzhen | March 2, 2019 | The Panglin Hotel | |
| 2019 | KristSingto Fan Meeting in Qingdao | March 9, 2019 | Qingdao Mangrove Tree Resort World - Conference and Exhibition Center | |
| 2019 | OffGun Fan Meeting in Hong Kong | March 31, 2019 | KITEC | |
| 2019 | Double Date: KristSingto & TayNew Fan Meeting in Hong Kong | April 14, 2019 | Rotunda 2, KITEC | |
| 2019 | TayNew Fan Meeting in Korea | May 11, 2019 | Howon Art Hall | |
| 2019 | Come To Me Fan Meeting in Taipei | May 11, 2019 | Dazhi Denwell | |
| 2019 | OffGun Fan Meeting in Myanmar | May 18, 2019 | LOTTE Hotel Crystal Ballroom | |
| 2019 | KristSingto Fan Meeting in Vietnam | May 26, 2019 | GALA Center | |
| 2019 | KristSingto Fan Meeting in Busan | June 22, 2019 | Dongnae Cultural Center | |
| 2019 | Theory of Love Fan Meeting in Taipei | June 22, 2019 | WESTAR | |
| 2019 | OffGun Fan Meeting in Vietnam | June 29, 2019 | Hong Bang International University | |
| 2019 | Our Skyy Fan Meeting in Taipei | July 21, 2019 | Taipei International Convention Center | |
| 2019 | Singto Fan Meeting in Hong Kong | July 28, 2019 | Music Zone, KITEC | |
| 2019 | TayNew & PluemChimon Fan Meeting in Myanmar | August 3, 2019 | Pullman Yangon Centrepoint Hotel | |
| 2019 | TayNew Fan Meeting in Guangzhou | August 10, 2019 | Nanfang Theatre | |
| 2019 | KristSingto Fan Meeting in Manila | August 17, 2019 | SM North EDSA Skydome | |
| 2019 | OffGun Fan Meeting in Korea | August 24, 2019 | Howon Art Hall | |
| 2019 | KristSingto Fan Meeting in Taipei | October 19, 2019 | ATT Show Box | |
| 2019 | Oishi Green Tea Presents: Our Skyy Fan Meeting in Myanmar | November 9, 2019 | Pullman Yangon Centrepoint Hotel | |
| 2019 | KristSingto Fan Meeting in Chengdu | November 16, 2019 | Chengdu Overseas Chinese Town Grand Theatre | |
| 2019 | TayNew Meeting in Chengdu | November 30, 2019 | Chengdu Rising Butterfly Hotel | |
| 2019 | KristSingto Fan Meeting in Japan | December 21, 2019 | Nissho Hall, Tokyo | |
| 2019 | Dark Blue Kiss: TayNew Fan Meeting in Taipei | December 21, 2019 | WESTAR | |
| 2019 | KristSingto Fan Meeting in Hong Kong | December 28, 2019 | Music Zone, KITEC | |
| 2021 | GMMTV Exhibition in Japan 2021 | April 16 – May 23, 2021 | Roppongi Keyakizaka Museum | |
| 2021 | GMMTV Exhibition in Japan 2021 | October 23 – November 21, 2021 | hmv museum, HMV & Books Shinsaibashi | |
| 2022 | TayNew Manila Fanmeet | July 30, 2022 | The Theatre at Solaire, Solaire Resort & Casino | |
| 2022 | GMMTV Fan Fest 2022 Live in Japan | August 27–28, 2022 | Pia Arena MM | |
| 2022 | OffGun Fan Meeting in Japan | September 24, 2022 | Yurakucho Asahi Hall, Yurakucho Mullion | |
| 2022 | Shooting Star Asia Tour in Jakarta | October 15, 2022 | The Kasablanka Hall, Kota Kasablanka | |
| 2022 | TayNew Fan Meeting in Korea | October 15, 2022 | Yearimdang Art Hall | |
| 2022 | OhmNanon Fan Meeting in Seoul | October 29, 2022 | New Millennium Hall, Konkuk University | |
| 2022 | Shooting Star Asia Tour in Kuala Lumpur | November 5, 2022 | Tropicana Gardens Mall Convention Centre | |
| 2022 | Shooting Star Asia Tour in Manila | November 19, 2022 | World Trade Center Metro Manila | |
| 2022 | OffGun Fan Meeting in Singapore | November 20, 2022 | Simpor Junior Ballroom, Marina Bay Sands | |
| 2022 | TayNew Fan Meeting in Osaka | November 27, 2022 | Dojima River Forum, Hotarumachi | |
| 2022 | JoongDunk Fan Meeting in Cambodia | December 3, 2022 | Major Cineplex by Smart, Aeon Mall Sen Sok City | |
| 2022 | EarthMix Wonderful Day in Vietnam | December 4, 2022 | Hoa Binh Theater | |
| 2022 | GMMTV Exhibition in Japan 22-23 | December 10, 2022 – January 9, 2023 | hmv museum, HMV & Books Shinsaibashi | |
| 2022 | KristSingto Fan Meeting in Japan; ~The Precious Memories~ | December 17, 2022 | Pacifico Yokohama Hall C/D | |
| 2022 | OhmNanon Fan Meeting in Taipei | December 18, 2022 | Zepp New Taipei, Honhui Plaza | |
| 2023 | JoongDunk - Shining in Vietnam | January 15, 2023 | GALA Center | |
| 2023 | OhmNanon Fan Meeting in Manila | January 21, 2023 | Samsung Hall, SM Aura Premier | |
| 2023 | GMMTV Fan Day in Tokyo | January 29, 2023 | Hokutopia Sakura Hall | |
| 2023 | Shooting Star Asia Tour in Taipei | February 5, 2023 | Taipei International Convention Center | |
| 2023 | OhmNanon Fan Meeting in Singapore | February 11, 2023 | The Joyden Hall, Bugis+ | |
| 2023 | Win Fan Meeting in Jakarta | February 11, 2023 | The Kasablanka Hall, Kota Kasablanka | |
| 2023 | Shooting Star Asia Tour in Hong Kong | February 18, 2023 | AsiaWorld-Summit (Hall 2) | |
| 2023 | OhmNanon Fan Meeting in Vietnam | February 18, 2023 | Ben Thanh Theater | |
| 2023 | PondPhuwin Fan Meeting in Cambodia | February 19, 2023 | Major Cineplex by Smart, Aeon Mall Mean Chey | |
| 2023 | GMMTV Fan Day 2 in Osaka | February 25–26, 2023 | Dojima River Forum | |
| 2023 | Shooting Star Asia Tour in Ho Chi Minh City | March 4, 2023 | Military Zone 7 Indoor Sports Complex | |
| 2023 | OhmNanon Fan Meeting in Hong Kong | March 5, 2023 | Rotunda 2, KITEC | |
| 2023 | OhmNanon Fan Meeting in Japan | March 11, 2023 | Harmony Hall Zama | |
| 2023 | Shooting Star Asia Tour in Singapore | March 11, 2023 | The Star Theatre, The Star Performing Arts Centre | |
| 2023 | Shooting Star Asia Tour in Japan | March 18–19, 2023 | Pia Arena MM | |
| 2023 | GeminiFourth Fan Meeting in Cambodia | March 25, 2023 | Major Cineplex by Smart, Aeon Mall Mean Chey | |
| 2023 | Shooting Star Asia Tour in Seoul | April 2, 2023 | Grand Peace Hall, Kyung Hee University | |
| 2023 | TayNew Fan Meeting in Hong Kong | April 2, 2023 | Kerry Hotel, Hong Kong | |
| 2023 | OffGun Fan Meeting in Taipei | April 8, 2023 | Zepp New Taipei, Honhui Plaza | |
| 2023 | PondPhuwin: Miracle in April | April 8, 2023 | District 10 Cultural Center | |
| 2023 | Krist Solo Concert Asia Tour 2023 in Japan | April 9, 2023 | Kanagawa Kenmin Hall | |
| 2023 | Krist Solo Concert Asia Tour 2023 in Japan | April 16, 2023 | Orix Theater | |
| 2023 | GMMTV Fan Day 3 in Seoul | April 22, 2023 | Guro-gu Community Center | |
| 2023 | TayNew Fan Meeting in Singapore | April 29, 2023 | Capitol Theatre, Singapore | |
| 2023 | GMMTV Fan Day 4 in Osaka | May 6–7, 2023 | Dojima River Forum | |
| 2023 | TayNew Fan Meeting in Taipei | May 7, 2023 | Zepp New Taipei, Honhui Plaza | |
| 2023 | EarthMix Fan Meeting in Taipei | May 13, 2023 (Note: originally scheduled for February 12, 2023) | Original ATT Show Box Da Zhi | |
| 2023 | Nanon Mini Live in Tokyo | May 22, 2023 | Shibuya Stream Hall | |
| 2023 | My School President Fan Meeting in Cambodia | May 27–28, 2023 | Aeon Hall, Aeon Mall Sen Sok City | |
| 2023 | OffGun Fan Meeting in Hong Kong | June 2, 2023 | Rotunda 3, KITEC | |
| 2023 | GeminiFourth Summer Holiday in Vietnam | June 3, 2023 | The Adora Center | |
| 2023 | EarthMix Fan Meeting in Hong Kong | June 9, 2023 | Rotunda 2,3/F, KITEC | |
| 2023 | BELUCA Fan Meeting in Singapore | June 10, 2023 | Capitol Theatre, Singapore | |
| 2023 | Win Fan Meeting in Manila | June 11, 2023 | New Frontier Theater | |
| 2023 | BrightWin Side by Side Concert Tour 2023; Side by Side Asia Tour in Japan | June 17–18, 2023 | Pia Arena MM | |
| 2023 | Dive into You - WinnySatang Fan Meeting in Vietnam | June 18, 2023 | White Palace Pham Van Dong | |
| 2023 | GMMTV Fan Day 5 in indonesia | July 1, 2023 | Studio 1, Epicentrum XXI | |
| 2023 | My School President Fan Meeting in Singapore | July 1, 2023 | Capitol Theatre, Singapore | |
| 2023 | My School President Fan Meeting in Taipei | July 8, 2023 | Zepp New Taipei, Honhui Plaza | |
| 2023 | BrightWin Side by Side Concert Tour 2023; Side By Side Concert Tour in Hong Kong | July 8, 2023 | AsiaWorld–Expo | |
| 2023 | GeminiFourth Fan Meeting in Tokyo | July 10, 2023 | EX Theater Roppongi | |
| 2023 | MarkFord 'School Break' Fan Meeting in Vietnam | July 15, 2023 | Army Theatre | |
| 2023 | Krist Solo Concert Asia Tour 2023 in Cambodia | July 15, 2023 | Aeon Hall, Aeon Mall Mean Chey | |
| 2023 | ForceBook Fan Meeting in Japan | July 16, 2023 | Shintoshi Hall | |
| 2023 | EarthMix Fly to the moon in Vietnam | July 22, 2023 | The Adora Center | |
| 2023 | Krist Solo Concert Asia Tour 2023 in Macau China | July 22, 2023 | Broadway Theatre, Broadway Macau | |
| 2023 | GMMTV Musicon: Tokyo | July 29, 2023 | Zepp DiverCity | |
| 2023 | GMMTV Musicon: Tokyo | July 30, 2023 | Toyosu PIT | |
| 2023 | GMMTV Musicon: Tokyo | July 31, 2023 (Note: Fan sign and Private Photo only, doesn't count as a show date) | TKP Shimbashi Conference Center | |
| 2023 | OffGun Fan Meeting in Seoul | July 29, 2023 | New Millennium Hall, Konkuk University | |
| 2023 | EarthMix Fan Meeting in Manila | July 30, 2023 | SM North EDSA Skydome | |
| 2023 | FirstKhaotung Fan Meeting in Hong Kong | August 4, 2023 | Music Zone @ E-Max, KITEC | |
| 2023 | My School President Fan Meeting in Manila | August 5, 2023 | UP Theater | |
| 2023 | JoongDunk: Back to Memories in Vietnam | August 5, 2023 | The Adora Center | |
| 2023 | FirstKhaotung Fan Meeting in Taipei | August 6, 2023 | WESTAR | |
| 2023 | PondPhuwin Fan Meeting in Macau | August 6, 2023 | H853 Entertainment Place | |
| 2023 | My School President Fan Meeting Hong Kong | August 12, 2023 | AsiaWorld-Summit | |
| 2023 | Dew Fan Meeting in Taipei | August 13, 2023 | Zepp New Taipei, Honhui Plaza | |
| 2023 | Krist Solo Concert Asia Tour 2023 in indonesia | August 19, 2023 | Balai Sarbini | |
| 2023 | GMMTV Fan Day 6 in Seoul | August 20, 2023 | Naksan Hall, Hansung University | |
| 2023 | GMMTV Fan Day 6 in Seoul | October 28, 2023 (Note: Shows scheduled for August 19 were rescheduled to October 28, due to VISA processing issues) | Yearimdang Art Hall | |
| 2023 | GMMTV Fan Time in Hokkaido | August 19–20, 2023 | Asty Hall | |
| 2023 | GMMTV Fan Day 7 in Cambodia | September 9–10, 2023 | Aeon Hall, Aeon Mall Sen Sok City | |
| 2023 | BELUCA Fan Meeting in Japan | September 15–16, 2023 | Toyosu PIT | |
| 2023 | GeminiFourth Fan Meeting in Taipei | September 23, 2023 | National Taiwan University Sports Center | |
| 2023 | Nanon Fancon in Macau | September 23, 2023 | H853 Entertainment Place | |
| 2023 | BELUCA Fan Meeting in Macau | September 24, 2023 | Broadway Theatre, Broadway Macau | |
| 2023 | BrightWin Side by Side Concert Tour 2023; Side By Side Concert Tour in Taipei | September 30, 2023 | Taoyuan Arena | |
| 2023 | Only You: FirstKhaotung Fan Meeting in Vietnam | September 30, 2023 | Gala Center | |
| 2023 | Nanon Fancon in Jakarta | September 30, 2023 | Gandaria City Hall | |
| 2023 | ForceBook Fan Meeting in Manila | October 1, 2023 | SM North EDSA Skydome | |
| 2023 | GMMTV Fan Fest 2023: Japan | October 9, 2023 | Pia Arena MM | |
| 2023 | Dew Fan Meeting in Manila | October 14, 2023 | Samsung Hall, SM Aura | |
| 2023 | ForceBook Fan Meeting in Taipei | October 15, 2023 | Legacy Taipei | |
| 2023 | Ohm Fan Meeting in Macau | October 21, 2023 | H853 Entertainment Place | |
| 2023 | The First Journey: ForceBook Fan Meeting in Vietnam | October 21, 2023 | District 10 Cultural Center | |
| 2023 | Dew Fan Meeting in Guangzhou | October 28, 2023 (Note: originally scheduled for October 27) | Guangzhou Beilei Theater | |
| 2023 | JoongDunk Hidden (Love) in Phnom Penh | October 28, 2023 | Major Cineplex by Smart, Aeon Mall Mean Chey (Note: changed from Aeon Hall, Aeon Mall Sen Sok) | |
| 2023 | WinnySatang Fan Meeting in Taipei | October 28, 2023 | WESTAR | |
| 2023 | GeminiFourth Fancy Ball in Hong Kong | October 29, 2023 | Rotunda 3, 6/F, KITEC | |
| 2023 | ForceBook Fan Meeting in Hong Kong | November 3, 2023 | Music Zone @ E-Max, KITEC | |
| 2023 | GMMTV Fan Event in Tokyo | November 3–4, 2023 | Hall Black, Animate Ikebukuro | |
| 2023 | Dew Fan Meeting in Hong Kong | November 4, 2023 (Note: originally scheduled for September 2 at Rotunda 3, KITEC, postponed due to the intensification of adverse weather conditions) | Rotunda 2, KITEC | |
| 2023 | PondPhuwin Fan Meeting in Hong Kong | November 4, 2023 (Note: originally scheduled for September 3 at Rotunda 3, KITEC, postponed due to the intensification of adverse weather conditions) | Rotunda 2, KITEC | |
| 2023 | JoongDunk Fan Meeting in Taipei | November 11, 2023 | Legacy Taipei | |
| 2023 | BrightWin Side by Side Concert Tour 2023; Side By Side Concert Tour in Cambodia | November 12, 2023 | Koh Pich Theatre | |
| 2023 | My School President Fan Meeting in Vietnam | November 12, 2023 | Hoa Binh Theater | |
| 2023 | GMMTV Fan Day 8 in Manila | November 18, 2023 | The Podium Hall | |
| 2023 | PerthChimon Sunset Time in Vietnam | November 18, 2023 | District 10 Cultural Center | |
| 2023 | Nanon Fancon in Hong Kong | November 19, 2023 | Star Hall, 3/F. KITEC | |
| 2023 | My School President in Tokyo | November 23, 2023 | Belle Salle Shinjuku Grand Hall | |
| 2023 | Celebrate Winter with PondPhuwin in Osaka | November 24, 2023 | Toyonaka Performing Arts Center | |
| 2023 | My School President Fan Meeting in Seoul | November 25, 2023 | Auditorium of Seoul Women's University | |
| 2023 | Ohm Fan Meeting in Yokohama | November 26, 2023 | Yokohama Bay Hall | |
| 2023 | PondPhuwin Fan Meeting in Taipei | December 2, 2023 | Zepp New Taipei, Honhui Plaza | |
| 2023 | ForceBook Fan Meeting in Italy | December 2, 2023 | Hilton Rome Airport Hotel, Rome | |
| 2023 | FirstKhaotung Fan Meeting in Brazil | December 3, 2023 | VIP Station, São Paulo | |
| 2023 | My School President Fan Meeting in Macau | December 3, 2023 | H853 Entertainment Place | |
| 2023 | Only Friends Fan Meeting in Japan | December 9, 2023 | Saitama Hall | |
| 2023 | PerthChimon Fan Meeting in Macau | December 9, 2023 | H853 Entertainment Place | |
| 2023 | BELUCA Fan Meeting in Manila | December 16, 2023 | New Frontier Theater | |
| 2023 | GMMTV Musicon: Jakarta | December 16, 2023 | Grand Ballroom, Pullman Jakarta Central Park | |
| 2023 | ForceBook Fan Meeting in Macau | December 16, 2023 | H853 Entertainment Place | |
| 2023 | Krist & Bright Countdown Concert in Japan | December 30–31, 2023 | Toyosu PIT | |
| 2024 | BELUCA Fan Meeting in Taipei | January 6, 2024 | Taipei International Convention Center | |
| 2024 | EarthMix Fan Meeting in Macau | January 6, 2024 | H853 Entertainment Place | |
| 2024 | JimmySea Fan Meeting in Taipei | January 7, 2024 | Legacy Taipei | |
| 2024 | Miracle Moment: Gun Fan Meeting in Nanning | January 13, 2024 | Nanning International Convention and Exhibition Center | |
| 2024 | JimmySea Fan Meeting in Macau | January 20, 2024 | H853 Entertainment Place | |
| 2024 | BELUCA Fan Meeting in Vietnam | January 21, 2024 | Nhà hát Hoà Bình | |
| 2024 | GMMTV Fan Time in Fukuoka | January 27–28, 2024 | Nishitetsu Hall | |
| 2024 | GMMTV Fan Day 9 in Osaka | February 3, 2024 | Cool Japan Park Osaka WW Hall | |
| 2024 | GMMTV Happy Weekend | February 23–25, 2024 | Tachikawa Stage Garden | |
| 2024 | Ohm Fan Meeting in Taipei | February 24, 2024 | Hanaspace | |
| 2024 | Love Agenda: JoongDunk Fan Meeting in Hong Kong | March 10, 2024 | Rotunda 3, KITEC | |
| 2024 | PerthChimon Fan Meeting in Hong Kong | March 16, 2024 | Rotunda 2,3/F, KITEC | |
| 2024 | JimmySea - The Magic Moment in Vietnam | March 17, 2024 | District 10 Cultural Center | |
| 2024 | FirstKhaotung Fan Meeting in Macau | March 30, 2024 | H853 Entertainment Place | |
| 2024 | EarthMix: Memories of You in Vietnam | March 30, 2024 | Hoa Binh Theater | |
| 2024 | PerthChimon Fan Meeting in Taipei | March 31, 2024 | Hanaspace | |
| 2024 | Only Friends Fan Meeting in Taipei | April 7, 2024 | National Taiwan University Sports Center | |
| 2024 | Sea Fan Meeting in Yangzhou | April 13, 2024 | Yangzhou, China | |
| 2024 | JimmySea Fan Meeting in Hong Kong | April 21, 2024 | Macpherson Stadium | |
| 2024 | JIB Dream Fanmeet 2 | April 27, 2024 | Hilton Rome Airport Hotel, Rome | |
| 2024 | Just For You: Ohm Fan Appreciarion Party | April 27, 2024 | Hefei, China | |
| 2024 | Nanon Born To BEO Concert Asia Tour: Nanon Born To BEO in Guiyang | May 1, 2024 | Guiyang International Eco-conference Center | |
| 2024 | So Pond With U: Pond Fan Meeting in Guiyang | May 2, 2024 | Guiyang International Eco-conference Center | |
| 2024 | 24th Thai Festival: Tokyo; OffGun Special Fan Meeting | May 9, 2024 | Yamano Hall, Tokyo | |
| 2024 | 24th Thai Festival: Tokyo; TayNew Special Fan Meeting | May 10, 2024 | Yamano Hall, Tokyo | |
| 2024 | GMMTV Fan Event in Tokyo | May 14–16, 2024 | Animate Theater, animate Ikebukuro Flagship Store | |
| 2024 | Win Holidate Fancon in Hong Kong | May 25, 2024 | AsiaWorld–Expo | |
| 2024 | Nanon Born To BEO Concert Asia Tour: Nanon Born To BEO in Hong Kong | June 1, 2024 | AXA Dreamland, Go Park | |
| 2024 | Ohm Fan Meeting in Vietnam | June 1, 2024 | Hoa Binh Cultural Center | |
| 2024 | GMMTV Fan Day 10 in Cambodia | June 2, 2024 | NagaWorld Hotel & Entertainment Complex | |
| 2024 | MilkLove Fan Meeting in Hong Kong | June 2, 2024 | AXA Dreamland, Go Park | |
| 2024 | Nanon Born To BEO Concert Asia Tour: Nanon Born To BEO in Taipei | June 8, 2024 | Clapper Studio | |
| 2024 | TayNew Fan Meeting in Hong Kong | June 8, 2024 | Rotunda 2,3/F, KITEC | |
| 2024 | MilkLove Fan Meeting in Taipei | June 9, 2024 | WESTAR | |
| 2024 | Off Fan Meeting in Chongqing | June 9, 2024 | Chongqing, China | |
| 2024 | Only Friends Fan Meeting in Hong Kong | June 15, 2024 | AXA Dreamland, Go Park | |
| 2024 | Destined Night: EarthMix Fan Meeting in Hong Kong | June 21, 2024 | Rotunda 2,3/F, KITEC | |
| 2024 | GMMTV Fan Day 11 in Seoul | June 22, 2024 | Guro-gu Community Center | |
| 2024 | GMMTV Fan Day 12 in Japan | June 23, 2024 | Winc Aichi Nagoya | |
| 2024 | GMMTV Fan Day 12 in Japan | June 29, 2024 | Hulic Hall Tokyo | |
| 2024 | GMMTV Fan Day 12 in Japan | June 30, 2024 | Zepp Namba | |
| 2024 | GMMTV Fan Day 13 in Manila | July 6, 2024 | SM North EDSA Skydome | |
| 2024 | Only Friends Fan Meeting in Vietnam | July 6, 2024 | Hoa Binh Theater | |
| 2024 | Last Twilight Fan Meeting in Hong Kong | July 6, 2024 | AXA Dreamland, Go Park | |
| 2024 | GMMTV Fan Event in Tokyo | July 13, 2024 | Shibuya Stream Hall | |
| 2024 | Ohm Fan Meeting in Guangxi | July 13, 2024 | Guangxi, China | |
| 2024 | Nanon Born To BEO Concert Asia Tour: Nanon Born To BEO in Tokyo | July 14, 2024 (Note: originally scheduled for April 28, 2024 at Kawaguchiko Stellar Theater) | Shibuya Stream Hall | |
| 2024 | KristSingto Fan Meeting in Macau | July 14, 2024 | JW Marriott Grand Ball Room | |
| 2024 | MilkLove Fan Meeting in Manila | July 20, 2024 | SM North EDSA Skydome | |
| 2024 | 720 Set Off To Love You Summer Party | July 20, 2024 | | |
| 2024 | This Summer with You: Perth | July 20, 2024 | HOPELIVE x C ONE Livehouse | |
| 2024 | Nanon Born To BEO Concert Asia Tour: Nanon Born To BEO in Ho Chi Minh | August 3, 2024 | Hoa Binh Cultural Center | |
| 2024 | JIB Dream Fanmeet 3 | August 3, 2024 | Hilton Rome Airport Hotel, Rome | |
| 2024 | New Fan Meeting in Chongqing | August 3, 2024 | Chongqing, China | |
| 2024 | GMMTV Fan Day 14 in Vietnam | August 10, 2024 | Ben Thanh Theatre | |
| 2024 | Glad to meet U: Pond Fan Meeting in Qingdao | August 10, 2024 | Tempo Livehouse | |
| 2024 | OffGun Fan Meeting in Hong Kong | August 10, 2024 | AXA Dreamland, Go Park | |
| 2024 | Jimmy 'Midsummer Night's Dream' Nanning Meetup | August 10, 2024 | Nanning International Convention and Exhibition Center | |
| 2024 | Nice to meet U: Phuwin Fan Meeting in Qingdao | August 11, 2024 | Tempo Livehouse | |
| 2024 | 2024 Sea 'Sunset Party' Nanning Meetup | August 11, 2024 | Nanning International Convention and Exhibition Center | |
| 2024 | SeaKeen Fan Meeting in Taipei | August 17, 2024 | Hanaspace | |
| 2024 | Nanon Born to BEO in Nanning | August 17, 2024 | Nanning International Convention and Exhibition Center | |
| 2024 | GMMTV Musicon in Hong Kong | August 18, 2024 | AXA Dreamland | |
| 2024 | BELUCA Fan Meeting in Cambodia | August 24, 2024 | Aeon Hall, Aeon Mall Sen Sok City | |
| 2024 | Joong Fan Sign in China | August 24, 2024 | | |
| 2024 | MilkLove Fan Meeting in Macau | August 24, 2024 | JW Marriott Grand Ball Room | |
| 2024 | TayNew Fan Meeting in Taipei | September 7, 2024 | Zepp New Taipei, Honhui Plaza | |
| 2024 | We Are Forever Asia Tour: We Are Forever Fancon in Vietnam | September 14, 2024 | Hoa Binh Theater | |
| 2024 | Boun - The Moment You Are Here | September 21, 2024 | | |
| 2024 | GreatInn Fan Meeting in Taipei | September 22, 2024 | Hanaspace | |
| 2024 | Singto Fan Meeting Event 2024 in Japan "The Summer Memory" | October 4, 2024 | Yamano Hall | |
| 2024 | GMMTV Musicon: Cambodia | October 5, 2024 | Nations Arts Bayon Academy Theatre | |
| 2024 | June's Lover: June Fan Meeting in Vietnam | October 5, 2024 | Ben Thanh Theater | |
| 2024 | Last Twilight Fan Meeting in Manila | October 12, 2024 | UP Theater | |
| 2024 | FirstKhaotung Fan Meeting in Taipei | October 13, 2024 | Legacy Taipei | |
| 2024 | We Are Forever Asia Tour: We Are Forever Fan Meeting in Japan | October 17–18, 2024 | Tachikawa Stage Garden | |
| 2024 | GeminiFourth Run The World Asia Tour: GeminiFourth Run The World in Vietnam | October 19, 2024 | Hoa Binh Theater | |
| 2024 | Chasing Light, Chasing Love: Tay Fan Meeting in Nanning | October 19, 2024 | Nanning, China | |
| 2024 | GMMTV Fanday 15 in Singapore | October 19, 2024 | GVMax, VivoCity | |
| 2024 | We Are Forever Asia Tour: We Are Forever Fan Meeting in Macau | October 20, 2024 | Mayfair Grand Ballroom, The Londoner Macao (Note: changed from Hong Kong) | |
| 2024 | Last Twilight Fan Meeting in Taipei | October 26, 2024 | Zepp New Taipei, Honhui Plaza | |
| 2024 | We Are Forever Asia Tour: We Are Forever Fan Meeting in Taipei | November 2, 2024 | Legacy TERA | |
| 2024 | Best Time to Meet U: Jimmy Fan Meeting in Chongqing | November 3, 2024 | Chongqing, China | |
| 2024 | JimmySea USA & Latin America Tour; JimmySea Fan Meeting in The USA | November 8, 2024 | Alex Theatre | |
| 2024 | Your Smile: Joong Fan Meeting in Indonesia | November 9, 2024 | Luxus Grand Ballroom Hall A, MGK Kemayoran | |
| 2024 | GeminiFourth Run The World Asia Tour: GeminiFourth Run The World in Taipei | November 9, 2024 | Taipei International Convention Center | |
| 2024 | JimmySea USA & Latin America Tour; JimmySea Fan Meeting in Mexico | November 13, 2024 | Teatro Metropólitan | |
| 2024 | JimmySea USA & Latin America Tour; JimmySea Fan Meeting in Brazil | November 15, 2024 | Terra SP - São Paulo | |
| 2024 | First Fan Sign in Chongqing | November 16, 2024 | Chongqing, China | |
| 2024 | Dunk Fan Sign in Chongqing | November 16, 2024 | Chongqing, China | |
| 2024 | ForceBook Fan Meeting in Hong Kong | November 17, 2024 | B P International | |
| 2024 | Khaotung Fan Sign in Chongqing | November 17, 2024 | Chongqing, China | |
| 2024 | Ohm Fan Sign in Shanghai | November 24, 2024 | Shanghai, China | |
| 2024 | Gun Fan Sign in Shanghai | December 1, 2024 | Shanghai, China | |
| 2024 | Win Holidate Fancon in Japan | December 8, 2024 (Note: originally scheduled for April 27, 2024 at Kawaguchiko Stellar Theater) | Toyosu PIT | |
| 2024 | GMMTV Fan Fest 2024 in Macau | December 8, 2024 | Galaxy Arena, Galaxy International Convention Center | |
| 2024 | GMMTV Fan Event in Tokyo | December 13–15, 2024 | Animate Theater, animate Ikebukuro Flagship Store | |
| 2024 | Stand by Pond: Pond Fan Sign in Shanghai | December 28, 2024 | Shanghai, China | |
| 2024 | Stay with Phuwin: Phuwin Fan Sign in Shanghai | December 29, 2024 | Shanghai, China | |
| 2025 | GMMTV Musicon: Nanning | January 5, 2025 | Guangxi Sports Center Gymnasium | |
| 2025 | JIB Dream Fanmeet 4: JIB BL Festival | January 11–12, 2025 | Hilton Rome Airport Hotel, Rome | |
| 2025 | MilkLove Fan Meeting in Taipei | January 11, 2025 | Zepp New Taipei, Honhui Plaza | |
| 2025 | GMMTV Fan Fest 2025: Japan | January 13, 2025 | Tokyo Garden Theater, Tokyo | |
| 2025 | OhmLeng Fan Meeting in Macau | January 19, 2025 | The Parisian Theatre, The Parisian | |
| 2025 | GeminiFourth Run The World Asia Tour: GeminiFourth Run The World in Manila | January 25, 2025 | SM North EDSA Skydome | |
| 2025 | GMMTV Fan Day 16 in Cambodia | January 25–26, 2025 (Note: originally scheduled for November 9, 2024) | Aeon Hall, Aeon Mall Sen Sok City | |
| 2025 | Year of Heart: New Fan Meeting in Suzhou | February 15, 2025 | Suzhou, China | |
| 2025 | Love is Sea: Sea Fan Meeting in Sichuan | February 15, 2025 | Sichuan, China | |
| 2025 | Love Behind Me: Namtan Fan Meeting in Nanning | February 15, 2025 | Nanning International Convention and Exhibition Center | |
| 2025 | Around Love: Film Fan Meeting in Nanning | February 16, 2025 | Nanning International Convention and Exhibition Center | |
| 2025 | GMMTV Fan Day 17 in Jakarta | February 22, 2025 | Bekasi Convention Center | |
| 2025 | Shine: Phuwin Fan Event in Suzhou | February 22, 2025 | Suzhou, China | |
| 2025 | Happy New Year: Krist Fansign in Beijing | February 22, 2025 | Beijing, China | |
| 2025 | Spring Appointment: First Fan Party in Qingdao | February 22, 2025 | Qingdao, China | |
| 2025 | LYKN Unleashed Asia Tour: LYKN Unleashed in Jakarta | February 23, 2025 | Bekasi Convention Center | |
| 2025 | EarthMix Fan Meeting in Taipei | February 23, 2025 | Zepp New Taipei, Honhui Plaza | |
| 2025 | Spring Limited: Khaotung Fan Party in Qingdao | February 23, 2025 | Qingdao, China | |
| 2025 | Spring Outing: Dunk Fan Party in Qingdao | February 23, 2025 | Qingdao, China | |
| 2025 | GMMTV Fan Day 18 in Tokyo | March 1, 2025 | B1F Hall, Bellesalle Shiodome | |
| 2025 | Wishing Upon the Stars: JimmySea Fan Meeting in Hong Kong | March 1, 2025 | AXA Dreamland, Go Park | |
| 2025 | LYKN Unleashed Asia Tour: LYKN Unleashed in Tokyo | March 2, 2025 | B1F Hall, Bellesalle Shiodome | |
| 2025 | Heart Field Blossoms: MilkLove Fan Meeting in Hong Kong | March 2, 2025 | AXA Dreamland, Go Park | |
| 2025 | GeminiFourth Run The World Asia Tour: GeminiFourth Run The World in Singapore | March 8, 2025 | The Theatre at Mediacorp, Singapore | |
| 2025 | Spring Breeze: Joong Fan Sign in Guangzhou | March 8, 2025 | Guangzhou, China | |
| 2025 | Where My Heart Rests: Milk Fan Meeting in Nanning | March 8, 2025 | Nanning Wharton International Hotel | |
| 2025 | Love Remains True: Chimon Fan Sign in Shanghai | March 8, 2025 | Shanghai, China | |
| 2025 | February 7th Party: Prem Fan Party in Guangzhou | March 8, 2025 | Guangzhou, China | |
| 2025 | LYKN Unleashed Asia Tour: LYKN Unleashed in Singapore | March 9, 2025 | The Theatre at Mediacorp, Singapore | |
| 2025 | Inches From The Heart: Love Fan Meeting in Nanning | March 9, 2025 | Nanning Wharton International Hotel | |
| 2025 | Spring Carnival: Boun Fan Party in Guangzhou | March 9, 2025 | Guangzhou, China | |
| 2025 | Blooming Moment: FirstKhaotung Fan Meeting in Tokyo | March 20, 2025 | Hulic Hall Tokyo | |
| 2025 | The Twenty-Five Year Engagement: Ohm Birthday Party in Chongqing | March 22, 2025 | Chongqing, China | |
| 2025 | Yizhiyu Offline Event in Qingdao: Pond Special Fan Event | March 22, 2025 | Qingdao, China | |
| 2025 | Sky-Nani Fan Meeting in Hong Kong | March 23, 2025 | AXA Dreamland, Go Park | |
| 2025 | GMMTV Fan Day 19 in Cambodia | March 29, 2025 | Aeon Mall Sen Sok City | |
| 2025 | My Muses: NamtanFilm Fan Meeting in Vietnam | March 29, 2025 | Nhà hát Bến Thành | |
| 2025 | GeminiFourth Run The World Asia Tour; GeminiFourth Run The World in Macau | March 30, 2025 (Note: originally scheduled for March 29, 2025) | Broadway Theatre, Broadway Macau | |
| 2025 | LYKN Unleashed Asia Tour; LYKN Unleashed in Phnom Penh | March 30, 2025 | Aeon Mall Sen Sok City | |
| 2025 | Moments with EarthMix: Love Beyond Eternity Fan Meeting in Hong Kong | March 30, 2025 | Regala Skycity Hotel | |
| 2025 | GeminiFourth U.S. Tour; GeminiFourth Fan Meeting in Miami | April 2, 2025 | Miramar Cultural Center, Miramar | |
| 2025 | GeminiFourth U.S. Tour; GeminiFourth Fan Meeting in New York | April 4, 2025 | SVA Theatre, New York City | |
| 2025 | The Heart Killers Fan Meeting in Vietnam | April 5, 2025 | District 10 Cultural Center | |
| 2025 | Spring Awakening: William Fan Party in Tianjin | April 5, 2025 | Tianjin, China | |
| 2025 | GeminiFourth U.S. Tour; Gemini Fan Meeting in Denver (Note: formerly named GeminiFourth Fan Meeting in Denver, changed due to unforeseen circumstances) | April 6, 2025 | Ogden Theatre, Denver | |
| 2025 | GeminiFourth Fan Meeting in Mexico City | April 9, 2025 | Teatro Metropolitan, Mexico City, Mexico | |
| 2025 | The Purple Twilight: Jimmy Fan Meeting in Chongqing | April 12, 2025 | Chongqing, China | |
| 2025 | Heart's Desire: Namtan Fan Meeting in Fuzhou | April 12, 2025 | Straits Culture and Art Center Opera House | |
| 2025 | Shining Blue Sky: Sea Fan Meeting in Chongqing | April 13, 2025 | Chongqing, China | |
| 2025 | Lost in The Stars: Film Fan Meeting in Fuzhou | April 13, 2025 | Straits Culture and Art Center Opera House | |
| 2025 | GMMTV Fan Day 20 in Taipei | April 19, 2025 | WESTAR | |
| 2025 | The Heart Killers Fan Meeting in Macau | April 19, 2025 | The Venetian Theatre, The Venetian Macau | |
| 2025 | Under the Starlight: New Fan Meeting in Nanning | April 19, 2025 | Nanning, China | |
| 2025 | LYKN Unleashed Asia Tour: LYKN Unleashed in Taipei | April 20, 2025 (Note: originally scheduled for February 9, 2025) | WESTAR | |
| 2025 | NamtanFilm Fan Meeting in Macau | April 20, 2025 | The Venetian Theatre, The Venetian Macau | |
| 2025 | Sky-Nani 1st Fan Meeting in Taipei | May 4, 2025 | Legacy TERA | |
| 2025 | 25th Thai Festival: Tokyo; KristSingto Special Fan Meeting | May 8, 2025 | New Pier Hall, Tokyo | |
| 2025 | T-Pop Showcase in Tokyo | May 8–11, 2025 | Shibuya Stream Hall | |
| 2025 | 25th Thai Festival: Tokyo; NamtanFilm Special Fan Meeting | May 9, 2025 | New Pier Hall, Tokyo | |
| 2025 | 25th Thai Festival: Tokyo; MilkLove Special Fan Meeting | May 9, 2025 | New Pier Hall, Tokyo | |
| 2025 | 25th Thai Festival: Tokyo; TayNew Special Fan Meeting | May 10, 2025 | New Pier Hall, Tokyo | |
| 2025 | Ever Est: Est Fan Party in Hangzhou | May 10, 2025 | Hangzhou, China | |
| 2025 | EmiBonnie Fan Meeting in Taipei | May 17, 2025 | Arts Center Auditorium, National Chengchi University | |
| 2025 | Sky-Nani Fan Meeting in Macau | May 18, 2025 | Broadway Theatre, Broadway Macau | |
| 2025 | Connected Hearts: MilkLove Fan Meeting in Vietnam | May 24, 2025 | District 10 Cultural Center | |
| 2025 | JimmySea European Tour: JimmySea Fan Meeting in Paris | May 24, 2025 | La Palmeraie Paris | |
| 2025 | Perfect 10 Liners Fan Meeting in Japan | May 24, 2025 | Ebisu The Garden Hall | |
| 2025 | Perfect 10 Liners Fan Sign Event in Japan | May 25, 2025 | Ebisu The Garden Hall | |
| 2025 | Thai Festival: Ho Chi Minh City | May 25, 2025 | Youth Cultural House, Ho Chi Minh City | |
| 2025 | JimmySea European Tour: JimmySea Fan Meeting in Berlin | May 28, 2025 | Säälchen, Holzmarktstraße 25 | |
| 2025 | Sweet Journey: Namtan Fan Appreciation Party | May 31, 2025 | Hangzhou, China | |
| 2025 | Dream Vacation: Film Fan Appreciation Party | June 1, 2025 | Hangzhou, China | |
| 2025 | Sky's Cool Encounter: Sky Fan Meeting in Qingdao | June 7, 2025 | Qingdao, China | |
| 2025 | Our Good Times: Nanon Fan Sign in Guangzhou | June 7, 2025 | Guangzhou, China | |
| 2025 | Midnight Reverie: BounPrem Fan Meeting in Macau | June 7, 2025 | Broadway Theatre, Broadway Macau | |
| 2025 | LYKN Unleashed Asia Tour: LYKN Unleashed in Macau | June 8, 2025 | Broadway Theatre, Broadway Macau | |
| 2025 | A Sweet Gathering: Nani Fan Meeting in Qingdao | June 8, 2025 | Qingdao, China | |
| 2025 | Force Fire! Force Fan Sign in Guangzhou | June 14, 2025 | Guangzhou, China | |
| 2025 | Book Boost! Book Fan Sign in Guangzhou | June 15, 2025 | Guangzhou, China | |
| 2025 | GMMTV Fan Event in Tokyo | June 20–22, 2025 | Animate Theatre, Tokyo | |
| 2025 | GMMTV Fan Day 21 in Vietnam | June 21, 2025 | Army Theatre, Ho Chi Minh City | |
| 2025 | Summer Shines On: Junior Fan Event in Nanning | June 21, 2025 | Guangxi Concert Hall, Nanning | |
| 2025 | LYKN Unleashed Tour: LYKN Unleashed in Ho Chi Minh City | June 22, 2025 | Army Theatre, Ho Chi Minh City | |
| 2025 | Where Stars Gather: Mark Fan Event in Nanning | June 22, 2025 | Guangxi Concert Hall, Nanning | |
| 2025 | AouBoom Fan Meeting in Macau | June 24, 2025 | Broadway Theatre | |
| 2025 | GeminiFourth Run The World Asia Tour: GeminiFourth Run The World in Osaka | June 29, 2025 | Zepp Namba, Osaka | |
| 2025 | The Heart Killers Fan Meeting in São Paulo | July 5, 2025 | Terra SP - São Paulo | |
| 2025 | The Heart Killers Escape to The Americas Tour: The Heart Killers Fan Meeting in Mexico City | July 10, 2025 | Teatro Metropolitan, Mexico City | |
| 2025 | The Heart Killers Escape to The Americas Tour: The Heart Killers Fan Meeting in New York | July 12, 2025 | United Palace, New York City | |
| 2025 | Summer Encounter in Suzhou: Ohm Fan Meeting in Suzhou | July 12, 2025 | Suzhou, China | |
| 2025 | Gift For You: Phuwin Fan Meeting in Guangzhou | July 12, 2025 | Guangzhou, China | |
| 2025 | JossGawin Fan Meeting in Taipei | July 13, 2025 | Zepp New Taipei, Honhui Plaza | |
| 2025 | A Little Joy: Pond Fan Meeting in Guangzhou | July 13, 2025 | Guangzhou, China | |
| 2025 | NamtanFilm Fan Meeting in Manila | July 18, 2025 | UP Theater, Manila | |
| 2025 | The Heart Killers Fan Meeting in Manila | July 19, 2025 | UP Theater, Manila | |
| 2025 | GMMTV Fan Day 22 in Osaka | July 20, 2025 | Cool Japan Park, Osaka WW Hall | |
| 2025 | Starry River: Milk Fan Meeting in Suzhou | July 26, 2025 | Suzhou, China | |
| 2025 | Heart Dawn: Fourth Fan Party in Shanghai | July 26, 2025 | Shanghai, China | |
| 2025 | GMMTV Musicon: Japan | July 26–27, 2025 | Toyosu PIT, Tokyo | |
| 2025 | Blossoms Shining: Love Fan Meeting in Suzhou | July 27, 2025 | Suzhou, China | |
| 2025 | Heart Dawn: Gemini Fan Party in Shanghai | July 27, 2025 | Shanghai, China | |
| 2025 | EmiBonnie Fan Meeting in Singapore | August 9, 2025 | GVmax Vivocity, Singapore | |
| 2025 | PondPhuwin Fan Meeting in Hong Kong | August 9, 2025 | AXA Dreamland, Go Park | |
| 2025 | NamtanFilm Fan Meeting in Hong Kong | August 10, 2025 | AXA Dreamland, Go Park | |
| 2025 | LYKN Unleashed Tour: LYKN Unleashed in Bengaluru | August 15, 2025 | Wings Arenas Kothanur | |
| 2025 | PolcaFam: Tay & Polcasan Fan Meeting in Hangzhou | August 16, 2025 | Hangzhou, China | |
| 2025 | Ink & Wash: Book Fan Sign in Hangzhou | August 16, 2025 | Hangzhou, China | |
| 2025 | LYKN Unleashed Tour: LYKN Unleashed in Delhi | August 17, 2025 | Talkatora Indoor Stadium | |
| 2025 | PolcaFam: New & Polcasan Fan Meeting in Hangzhou | August 18, 2025 | Hangzhou, China | |
| 2025 | Perfect 10 Liners Fan Meeting in Manila | August 23, 2025 | Samsung Hall, SM Aura Premier | |
| 2025 | Writings of Our Time: Jimmy Fan Sign in Suzhou | August 23, 2025 | Suzhou, China | |
| 2025 | Language of the Wind: Sea Fan Sign in Suzhou | August 24, 2025 | Suzhou, China | |
| 2025 | GMMTV Fan Day 23 in Manila | August 24, 2025 | Samsung Hall, SM Aura Premier | |
| 2025 | Heart-fluttering Adventure in Siam: Perth Fan Sign in Shanghai | August 24, 2025 | Shanghai, China | |
| 2025 | KristSingto Fan Meeting in Taipei | August 30, 2025 | WESTAR | |
| 2025 | JIB Dream Fanmeet 5 | August 30–31, 2025 | Hilton Rome Airport Hotel, Rome | |
| 2025 | WEst Side Story: WilliamEst Fan Meeting in Hong Kong | August 31, 2025 | AXA Dreamland, Go Park | |
| 2025 | GeminiFourth Fan Meeting in Mexico | September 4, 2025 | Teatro Metropólitan | |
| 2025 | GMMTV Fan Day 24 in Singapore | September 6, 2025 | D'Marquee, Downtown East | |
| 2025 | PEBACA What A Concert in Singapore | September 7, 2025 | D'Marquee Downtown East, Singapore | |
| 2025 | GMMTV Fan Day 25 in Los Angeles | September 14, 2025 | Alex Theatre, Los Angeles | |
| 2025 | WilliamEst Fan Meeting in Taipei | September 20, 2025 | Legacy Taipei, Taipei | |
| 2025 | Gathering for Chen Guang: Ohm Fan Sign in Xi'an | September 20, 2025 | Xi'an, China | |
| 2025 | Whale Dream: Milk Fan Event in Chongqing | September 20, 2025 | Chongqing, China | |
| 2025 | EarthMix Fan Meeting in Mexico | September 21, 2025 | Frontón Bucareli, Cuauhtémoc | |
| 2025 | Whale Alley: Love Fan Event in Chongqing | September 21, 2025 | Chongqing, China | |
| 2025 | Carnival of Time: Boom Fan Sign in Shanghai | September 21, 2025 | Shanghai, China | |
| 2025 | Heartfelt Amusement Park: Aou Fan Sign in Shanghai | September 22, 2025 | Shanghai, China | |
| 2025 | LYKN Unleashed Tour: LYKN Unleashed in Manila | September 27, 2025 | SM North EDSA Skydome | |
| 2025 | EmiBonnie Fan Meeting in Hong Kong | September 27, 2025 | AXA Dreamland, Go Park | |
| 2025 | PEBACA What A Concert in Japan | September 28, 2025 | Toyosu PIT, Tokyo | |
| 2025 | OffGun European Tour: OffGun Fan Meeting in Madrid | October 4, 2025 | Kinépolis Ciudad de la Imagen, Madrid | |
| 2025 | JossGawin European Tour: JossGawin Fan Meeting in Madrid | October 4, 2025 | Kinépolis Ciudad de la Imagen, Madrid | |
| 2025 | KapookCiize Fan Meeting in Taipei | October 4, 2025 | WESTAR | |
| 2025 | TayNew & Polcasan Fan Meeting in Hong Kong | October 4, 2025 | Regala Skycity Hotel Grand Ballroom | |
| 2025 | Stellar Glow: Phuwin Fan Event in Shanghai | October 4, 2025 | Shanghai, China | |
| 2025 | Autumn Blossom: Pond Fan Event in Shanghai | October 5, 2025 | Shanghai, China | |
| 2025 | OffGun European Tour: OffGun Fan Meeting in London | October 6, 2025 | The Clapham Grand, London | |
| 2025 | JossGawin European Tour: JossGawin Fan Meeting in London | October 6, 2025 | The Clapham Grand, London | |
| 2025 | OffGun European Tour: OffGun Fan Meeting in Paris | October 8, 2025 | La Palmeraie, Paris | |
| 2025 | JossGawin European Tour: JossGawin Fan Meeting in Paris | October 8, 2025 | La Palmeraie, Paris | |
| 2025 | JossGawin US & Latin America Tour: JossGawin Fan Meeting in Brazil | October 11, 2025 | Studio Stage, São Paulo | |
| 2025 | FirstKhaotung Fan Meeting in Hong Kong | October 12, 2025 | AXA Dreamland, Go Park | |
| 2025 | JossGawin US & Latin America Tour: JossGawin Fan Meeting in Mexico | October 13, 2025 | Auditorio BB, Cuauhtémoc | |
| 2025 | JossGawin US & Latin America Tour: JossGawin Fan Meeting in Atlanta | October 15, 2025 | Variety Playhouse, Atlanta | |
| 2025 | JossGawin US & Latin America Tour: JossGawin Fan Meeting in Los Angeles | October 17, 2025 | The United Theatre on Broadway, Los Angeles | |
| 2025 | GeminiFourth Fan Meeting in Denver | October 18, 2025 | Ogden Theatre, Denver | |
| 2025 | Love Signal: MilkLove Fan Meeting in Taipei | October 19, 2025 | WESTAR | |
| 2025 | Keep the Beat: WilliamEst Fan Meeting in Vietnam | October 25, 2025 | Hoa Binh District 10 Cultural Center | |
| 2025 | AGAin 2015 - 10 Years Together: KristSingto Fan Meeting in Seoul | October 25, 2025 | Yoodang Art Hall, Seoul | |
| 2025 | Destiny's Harbour: NamtanFilm Fan Meeting in Singapore | November 1, 2025 | GVmax, Vivocity | |
| 2025 | Sky-Nani Fan Meeting in Seoul | November 2, 2025 | Woojung Green Campus Grand Hall, Sungshin Women's University | |
| 2025 | JimmySea Fan Meeting in Macau | November 8, 2025 | The Londoner Theatre, Macau | |
| 2025 | KristSingto Fan Meeting in Berlin | November 9, 2025 | Estrel Hotel, Berlin | |
| 2025 | BounPrem Fan Meeting in Berlin | November 9, 2025 | Estrel Hotel, Berlin | |
| 2025 | JossGawin Fan Meeting in Macau | November 10, 2025 | The Parisian Theatre, The Parisian | |
| 2025 | PEBACA What A Concert in Manila | November 22, 2025 | Up Theatre, Manila | |
| 2025 | Fourth Of My Eye: Fourth Fan Meeting in Nanning | November 22, 2025 | Nanning, China | |
| 2025 | GMMTV Fan Day 26 in Vietnam | November 22–23, 2025 | Ben Thanh Theatre, Ho Chi Minh City | |
| 2025 | Fall in Love with Joong: Joong Fan Sign in Zhejiang | November 23, 2025 | Zhejiang, China | |
| 2025 | Blush Blossom Fan Fest in Macau | November 30, 2025 | Fisherman's Wharf Convention & Exhibition Center | |
| 2025 | JIB Dream Fanmeet 6 | December 13, 2025 | Hilton Rome Airport Hotel, Rome | |
| 2025 | GMMTV Fan Day 27 in Tokyo | December 13, 2025 | Nisho Hall, Tokyo | |
| 2026 | EmiBonnie Fan Meeting in Taipei | January 11, 2026 | Zepp New Taipei, Honhui Plaza | |
| 2026 | GMMTV Fan Day 28 in Tokyo | January 11, 2026 | Nissho Hall, Tokyo | |
| 2026 | BounPrem Fan Meeting in Singapore | January 17, 2026 | Foochow Hall, Singapore | |
| 2026 | Falling in Love: Earth Fan Meeting in Shanghai | January 17, 2026 | Shanghai, China | |
| 2026 | Beginning with You: Mix Fan Meeting in Shanghai | January 18, 2026 | Shanghai, China | |
| 2026 | NamtanFilm Fan Meeting in Taipei | January 18, 2026 | Zepp New Taipei, Honhui Plaza | |
| 2026 | WilliamEst Echo: Resonance Fan Meeting in Singapore | January 24, 2026 | G Max Velocity, Singapore | |
| 2026 | Long Time No See: Prem Fan Sign in Shanghai | January 24, 2026 | Shanghai, China | |
| 2026 | Reunited Heartbeat: Boun Fan Sign in Shanghai | January 25, 2026 | Shanghai, China | |
| 2026 | MilkLove Fan Meeting in Manila | January 25, 2026 | SM North EDSA Skydome, Quezon City, Manila | |
| 2026 | Let's Meet in Winter: Santa Fan Sign in Shanghai | January 31, 2026 | Shanghai, China | |
| 2026 | Goodbye Winter, Welcome Spring: Krist Fan Sign in Shanghai | February 7, 2026 | Shanghai, China | |
| 2026 | Reborn as a Photographer: Phuwin Fan Sign in Hangzhou | February 7, 2026 | Hangzhou, China | |
| 2026 | The Lion Celebrates the New Year: Singto Fan Sign in Shanghai | February 8, 2026 | Shanghai, China | |
| 2026 | Meet the Dominant CEO: Pond Fan Sign in Hangzhou | February 8, 2026 | Hangzhou, China | |
| 2026 | GMMTV Fan Event in Tokyo | February 13–15, 2026 | Animate Theater, Tokyo | |
| 2026 | PondPhuwin Rendezvous Fancon in Macau | February 19, 2026 | AXA Dreamland, Go Park | |
| 2026 | EmiBonnie Fan Meeting in Manila | February 21, 2026 | SM North EDSA Skydome, Manila | |
| 2026 | GMMTV Fan Fest 2026 in Japan | February 21, 2026 | Tokyo Garden Theater, Tokyo | |
| 2026 | LYKN Unleashed World Tour: LYKN Unleashed in Mexico | March 5, 2026 | Teatro Metropolitan, Mexico City | |
| 2026 | PerthSanta Time Stopper Fancon in Vietnam | March 7, 2026 | Hoa Binh Theater, Ho Chi Minh City | |
| 2026 | Great Lenghts to Meet You: Dunk Fan Sign in Guangzhou | March 7, 2026 | Guangzhou, China | |
| 2026 | Story of Happiness: Boun Fan Sign in Hangzhou | March 7, 2026 | Hangzhou, China | |
| 2026 | Ensure Your Happiness: Prem Fan Sign in Hangzhou | March 8, 2026 | Hangzhou, China | |
| 2026 | Under the White Moonlight: Joong Fan Sign in Guangzhou | March 8, 2026 | Guangzhao, China | |
| 2026 | GMMTV Fan Day 29 in USA: New York | March 8, 2026 | Racket NYC, New York | |
| 2026 | LYKN Unleashed World Tour: LYKN Unleashed in New York City | March 9, 2026 | Music Hall of Williamsburg, New York City | |
| 2026 | GMMTV Fan Day 29 in USA: New York | March 10, 2026 | Brooklyn Steel, New York | |
| 2026 | GMMTV Fan Day 29 in USA: Los Angeles | March 15, 2026 | Alex Theatre, Los Angeles | |
| 2026 | New Era: Ohm Fan Sign in Chongqing | March 21, 2026 | Chongqing, China | |
| 2026 | Echoes of Time: Perth Fan Sign in Tianjin | March 21, 2026 | Tianjin, China | |
| 2026 | Memory Fold: Santa Fan Sign in Tianjin | March 22, 2026 | Tianjin, China | |
| 2026 | EarthMix Fan Meeting in Berlin | March 22, 2026 | Estrel Hotel, Berlin | |
| 2026 | FirstKhaotung Fan Meeting in Berlin | March 22, 2026 | Estrel Hotel, Berlin | |
| 2026 | Lovestruck: WilliamEst Fan Meeting in Manila | March 22, 2026 | Metrotent Convention Center, Pasig City | |
| 2026 | PEBACA What A Concert in Taipei | March 22, 2026 | Zepp New Taipei, Honhui Plaza | |
| 2026 | JuniorMark Fan Meeting in Taipei | March 29, 2026 | WESTAR | |
| 2026 | Sweet Serenade: MilkLove Fan Meeting in Hong Kong | March 29, 2026 | AXA Dreamland, Go Park | |
| 2026 | LYKN Dusk & Dawn World Tour: LYKN Dusk & Dawn in Warsaw | March 29, 2026 | Palladium, Warsaw | |
| 2026 | LYKN Dusk & Dawn Tour: LYKN Dusk & Dawn in Berlin | April 1, 2026 | Uber Eats Music Hall, Berlin | |
| 2026 | LYKN Dusk & Dawn World Tour: LYKN Dusk & Dawn in Paris | April 4, 2026 | Arena Grand Paris, Paris | |
| 2026 | PondPhuwin Rendezvous Fancon in Singapore | April 4, 2026 | The Theatre at Mediacorp, Singapore | |
| 2026 | Beyond the Plan B: BounPrem Fan Meeting in Hong Kong | April 4, 2026 | AXA Dreamland, Go Park | |
| 2026 | Framed in Love: NamtanFilm Fan Meeting in Hong Kong | April 5, 2026 | AXA Dreamland, Go Park | |
| 2026 | LYKN Dusk & Dawn Tour; LYKN Dusk & Dawn in Milan | April 7, 2026 | Teatro Lirico Giorgio Faber, Milan | |
| 2026 | LYKN Dusk & Dawn World Tour: LYKN Dusk & Dawn in London | April 10, 2026 | 02 Shepherd's Bush Empire | |
| 2026 | EmiBonnie Fan Meeting in Seoul | April 11, 2026 | Kwangwoon University Donghae Culture & Arts Center | |
| 2026 | Hidden Hearts: JoongDunk Fan Meeting in Ho Chi Minh City | April 11, 2026 | Hoa Binh Cultural Center, Ho Chi Minh City | |
| 2026 | Across the Sky to You: Junior & Jummo Fan Meeting in Shanghai | April 11, 2026 | Shanghai, China | |
| 2026 | With You as the Stars Shine: Jimmy Fan Sign in Guangzhou | April 11, 2026 | Guangzhou, China | |
| 2026 | Into the Night, Closer to You: Joss Fan Sign in Shenzhen | April 11, 2026 | Shenzhen, China | |
| 2026 | Into the Light, Closer to You: Gawin Fan Sign in Shenzhen | April 12, 2026 | Shenzhen, China | |
| 2026 | Across the Sky to You: Mark & Jummo Fan Meeting in Shanghai | April 12, 2026 | Shanghai, China | |
| 2026 | Bright, Twinkling Stars: Sea Fan Sign in Guangzhou | April 12, 2026 | Guangzhou, China | |
| 2026 | Bonnie & Any Fan Meeting in Guangzhou | April 18, 2026 | Guangzhou, China | |
| 2026 | PerthSanta Time Stopper Fancon in Taipei | April 19, 2026 | Zepp New Taipei, Honhui Plaza | |
| 2026 | Back With You: JimmySea Fan Meeting in Taipei | April 24, 2026 | Legacy TERA, Taipei | |
| 2026 | The Wonderful Adventure: Chimon Fan Sign in Hangzhou | April 25, 2026 | Hangzhou, China | |
| 2026 | Dunk's Sweet Shop: Dunk Fan Sign in Shanghai | May 2, 2026 | Shanghai, China | |
| 2026 | Phuwin Mode On! Phuwin Fan Sign in Shanghai | May 2, 2026 | Shanghai, China | |
| 2026 | A Moment of Summer Light with Polca Family: Tay & Polcasan Fan Sign in Shanghai | May 2, 2026 | Shanghai, China | |
| 2026 | Pond With You! Pond Fan Sign in Shanghai | May 3, 2026 | Shanghai, China | |
| 2026 | A Moment of Summer Light with Polca Family: New & Polcasan Fan Sign in Shanghai | May 3, 2026 | Shanghai, China | |
| 2026 | SeaKeen Fan Meeting in Taipei | May 3, 2026 | Hanaspace, Taipei | |
| 2026 | Clo'ver & Felizz T-Pop Showcase | May 3, 2026 | Hanaspace, Taipei | |
| 2026 | Summer Sea, Heartbeats for You: Est Fan Sign in Shanghai | May 4, 2026 | Shanghai, China | |
| 2026 | GMMTV Riser Music T-Pop Showcase: Tokyo | May 8, 2026 | Hokutopia Sakura Hall, Tokyo | |
| 2026 | 26th Thai Festival Tokyo: TayNew Special Fan Meeting | May 8, 2026 | New Pier Hall, Tokyo | |
| 2026 | 26th Thai Festival Tokyo: KristSingto Special Fan Meeting | May 9, 2026 | New Pier Hall, Tokyo | |
| 2026 | SeaKeen Fan Meeting in Tokyo | May 9, 2026 | Shibuya Stream Hall, Tokyo | |
| 2026 | GMMTV Riser Music T-Pop Showcase: Tokyo | May 10, 2026 | Shibuya Stream Hall, Tokyo | |
| 2026 | LYKN Dusk & Dawn World Tour: LYKN Dusk & Dawn in Tokyo | May 11, 2026 | Zepp DiverCity, Tokyo | |
| 2026 | Just You & Win: Win Fan Meeting in Osaka | May 14, 2026 | Osaka | |
| 2026 | Just You & Win: Win Fan Meeting in Kuala Lumpur | May 16, 2026 | Kuala Lumpur | |
| 2026 | Ten Years of Light: Ohm Fan Sign in Hangzhou | May 16, 2026 | Hangzhou, China | |
| 2026 | The Wonderful Adventures: Chimon Fan Sign in Hangzhou | May 16, 2026 | Hangzhou, China | |
| 2026 | Because of You: Gun Fan Sign in Hangzhou | May 16, 2026 | Hangzhou, China | |
| 2026 | Because of You: Off Fan Sign in Hangzhou | May 17, 2026 | Hangzhou, China | |
| 2026 | JIB Dream Fanmeet 6.5 | May 23, 2026 | Milton Rome Airport Hotel, Rome | |
| 2026 | Summer Fantasy on Surf: Surf Fan Sign in Shanghai | May 30, 2026 | Shanghai, China | |
| 2026 | Summer Love on Java: Java Fan Sign in Shanghai | May 30, 2026 | Shanghai, China | |
| 2026 | GMMTV Musicon 2026: Singapore | May 30–31, 2026 | Singapore Expo, Singapore | |
| 2026 | Two Hearts, One Journey: Junior Fan Sign in Hangzhou | June 6, 2026 | Hangzhou, China | |
| 2026 | Force Fan Sign in Chongqing | June 6, 2026 | Chongqing, China | |
| 2026 | Book Fan Sign in Chongqing | June 7, 2026 | Chongqing, China | |
| 2026 | Starry Gifts, Time As Witness: Mark Fan Sign in Hangzhou | June 7, 2026 | Hangzhou, China | |
| 2026 | GMMTV Fan Day 31 in Taipei | June 13, 2026 | Zepp New Taipei, Honhui Plaza | |
| 2026 | PondPhuwin Rendezvous Fancon in Hong Kong | June 13, 2026 | Macau Fisherman's Wharf Convention and Exhibition Centre | |
| 2026 | A Day With Nanon: Nanon Fan Sign in Hangzhou | June 13, 2026 | Hangzhou, China | |
| 2026 | Heartwarming Thoughts of Meeting You: Sea Fan Sign in Shanghai | June 13, 2026 | Shanghai, China | |
| 2026 | Heartfelt Anticipation to Meet You: Jimmy Fan Sign in Shanghai | June 14, 202 | Shanghai, China | |
| 2026 | LYKN Dusk & Dawn World Tour: LYKN Dusk & Dawn in Taipei | June 14, 202 | Zepp New Taipei, Honhui Plaza | |
| 2026 | WilliamEst European Tour: WilliamEst Fan Meeting in Frankfurt | June 20, 2026 | Zoom Frankfurt, Frankfurt am Main | |
| 2026 | PerthSanta Time Stopper Fancon in Singapore | June 20, 2026 | The Theatre at Mediacorp, Singapore | |
| 2026 | 4Ever Young: GeminiFourth Fan Meeting in Vietnam | June 20, 2026 | C30 Hoa Binh Stage | |
| 2026 | Let's Meet in the Midsummer: Milk Fan Sign in Shanghai | June 20, 2026 | Shanghai, China | |
| 2026 | Let's Meet With Excitement: Love Fan Sign in Shanghai | June 21, 2026 | Shanghai, China | |
| 2026 | WilliamEst European Tour: WilliamEst Fan Meeting in Madrid | June 21, 2026 | La Estación, Gran Teatro CaixaBank Principe | |
| 2026 | NamtanFilm Fan Meeting in Madrid | June 21, 2026 | La Estación, Gran Teatro CaixaBank Principe | |
| 2026 | ForceBook Fan Meeting in Ho Chi Minh City | June 23, 2026 | C30 Stage, Ho Chi Minh City | |
| 2026 | Summer Moments: Perth Fan Sign in Suzhou | June 27, 2026 | Suzhou, China | |
| 2026 | Summer Vibe: Santa Fan Sign in Suzhou | June 28, 2026 | Suzhou, China | |
| 2026 | Girl Rules Fan Meeting in Seoul | July 4, 2026 | Dongnae Culture Art Centre, Kwangwoon University | |
| 2026 | LYKN Dusk & Dawn World Tour: LYKN Dusk & Dawn in Jakarta | July 11, 2026 | The Kasablanka Hall, Jakarta | |
| 2026 | Stars Shine: Boun Fan Sign in Chongqing | July 11, 2026 | Chongqing, China | |
| 2026 | Evening Breeze Date, Adoring Bonnie: Bonnie Fan Sign in Shanghai | July 11, 2026 | Shanghai, China | |
| 2026 | Summer Radiance, Encounter with Emi: Emi Fan Sign in Shanghai | July 12, 2026 | Shanghai, China | |
| 2026 | Moment Like This: Prem Fan Sign in Chongqing | July 12, 2026 | Chongqing, China | |
| 2026 | JimmySea Dreamscape Fancon in Hong Kong | July 17–18, 2026 | AXA Dreamland, Go Park | |
| 2026 | PondPhuwin Rendezvous Fancon in Vietnam | July 18, 2026 | Hoa Binh Theatre, Ho Chi Minh City | |
| 2026 | LYKN Dusk & Dawn World Tour: LYKN Dusk & Dawn in Macau | July 18, 2026 | Broadway Theatre, Broadway Macau | |
| 2026 | Gemini & Look Khunnoo Fan Sign in Shanghai | July 22, 2026 | Shanghai, China | |
| 2026 | Fourth & Look Khunnoo Fan Sign in Shanghai | July 22, 2026 | Shanghai, China | |
| 2026 | Enemies with Benefits Fan Meeting in Macau | July 25, 2026 | Fisherman's Wharf Convention and Exhibition Center | |
| 2026 | PondPhuwin Rendezvous Fancon in Taipei | July 25, 2026 | Legacy TERA, Taipei | |
| 2026 | My Way To You: GeminiFourth & Look Khunnoo Fan Meeting in Taipei | July 26, 2026 | NTU Sports Center, Taipei | |
| 2026 | Girl Rules Fan Meeting in Singapore | August 1, 2026 | D'Marquee Downtown East, Singapore | |
| 2026 | Just You & Win: Win Fan Meeting in Jakarta | August 1, 2026 | Balai Kartini, Kartika Expo Center | |
| 2026 | Across the Mountains and Seas to You: Chokun Fan Sign in China | August 1, 2026 | China | |
| 2026 | Sincerely Waiting to Meet You: Aston Fan Sign in China | August 2, 2026 | China | |
| 2026 | PondPhuwin Rendezvous Fancon in Manila | August 2, 2026 | New Frontier Theater, Manila | |
| 2026 | Girl Rules Fan Meeting in Macau | August 8, 2026 | Fisherman's Wharf Conference Exhibition Center | |
| 2026 | GMMTV Fan Fest 2026 in Macau | August 8, 2026 | The Venetian Cotai Expo Hall | |
| 2026 | Sea U Soon: Sea Fan Sign in China | August 8, 2026 | China | |
| 2026 | Be Your Keen: Keen Fan Sign in China | August 9, 2026 | China | |
| 2026 | LYKN Dusk & Dawn World Tour: LYKN Dusk & Dawn in Brazil | August 9, 2026 | Audio, São Paulo | |
| 2026 | LYKN Dusk & Dawn World Tour: LYKN Dusk & Dawn in Los Angeles | August 14, 2026 | The Orpheum, Los Angeles | |
| 2026 | Girl Rules Fan Meeting in Taipei | August 15, 2026 | NCCU Art & Culture Center | |
| 2026 | LYKN Dusk & Dawn World Tour: LYKN Dusk & Dawn in San Francisco | August 16, 2026 | Palace of Fine Arts | |
| 2026 | LYKN Dusk & Dawn World Tour: LYKN Dusk & Dawn in Chicago | August 20, 2026 | Copernicus Center | |
| 2026 | LYKN Dusk & Dawn World Tour: LYKN Dusk & Dawn in New York City | August 22, 2026 | Palladium Times Square | |
| 2026 | Starry Veil's Embrace: Jan Fan Sign in China | August 22, 2026 | China | |
| 2026 | Starry Veils Drift Softly: JingJing Fan Sign in China | August 23, 2026 | China | |
| 2026 | BounPrem Fan Meeting in New York | August 23, 2026 | Brooklyn Steel, New York City | |
| 2026 | Just You and Win: Win Fan Meeting in New York | August 23, 2026 | Brooklyn Steel, New York City | |
| 2026 | BounPrem Fan Meeting in Colorado | August 27, 2026 | Boulder Theatre, Colorado | |
| 2026 | JIB Fanmeet 7 | August 29–30, 2026 | Milton Rome Airport Hotel, Rome | |
| 2026 | BounPrem Fan Meeting in Brazil | August 30, 2026 | Teatro APCD, São Paulo | |
| 2026 | GMMTV Fan Day 32 in Singapore | September 5, 2026 | The Theatre at Mediacorp, Singapore | |
| 2026 | Written in the Stars: JimmySea Fan Meeting in Vietnam | September 5, 2026 | C30 Hoa Binh Stage, Ho Chi Minh City | |
| 2026 | LYKN Dusk & Dawn World Tour: LYKN Dusk & Dawn in Singapore | September 6, 2026 | The Theatre at Mediacorp, Singapore | |
| 2026 | Enemies with Benefits Fan Meeting in Taipei | September 6, 2026 | Zepp New Taipei, Honhui Plaza | |
| 2026 | JossGawin FanMeeting in Washington D.C. | September 6, 2026 | The Howard Theatre, Washington D.C. | |
| 2026 | Only Friends: Dream On Americas Tour: Only Friends: Dream On in Mexico City | September 9, 2026 | Expo Reforma, Mexico City | |
| 2026 | Only Friends: Dream On Americas Tour: Only Friends: Dream On in Lima | September 12, 2026 | Parque de la Exposición, Lima | |
| 2026 | WilliamEst Fan Meeting in Taipei | September 12, 2026 | Zepp New Taipei, Honhui Plaza | |
| 2026 | FLIO Meet & Greet in Tokyo | September 13, 2026 | Laforet Museum Harajuku, Tokyo | |
| 2026 | Only Friends: Dream On Americas Tour: Only Friends: Dream On in Brazil | September 14, 2026 | Teatro Renault, São Paulo | |
| 2026 | LYKN Dusk & Dawn World Tour: LYKN Dusk & Dawn in Manila | September 18, 2026 | World Trade Center Hall A | |
| 2026 | GMMTV Fan Day 33 in Osaka | September 19, 2026 | Cool Japan Park, Osaka WW Hall | |
| 2026 | GMMTV Fan Day 34 in Sydney | September 19, 2026 | City Recital Hall, Sydney | |
| 2026 | CLO'VER Fan Sign in Sydney | September 19, 2026 | City Recital Hall, Sydney | |
| 2026 | JuniorMark Fan Meeting in Singapore | September 19, 2026 | D'marquee, Downtown East | |
| 2026 | LYKN Dusk & Dawn World Tour: LYKN Dusk & Dawn in Osaka | September 20–21, 2026 | Cool Japan Park, Osaka WW Hall | |
| 2026 | GMMTV Fan Day 35 in Vietnam | September 26, 2026 | Nguyen Du Gymnasium, Ho Chi Minh City | |
| 2026 | JoongDunk & Jaidee Fan Meeting in Seoul | September 26, 2026 | Yerimdang Art Hall, Seoul | |
| 2026 | LYKN Dusk & Dawn World Tour: LYKN Dusk & Dawn in Ho Chi Minh City | September 27, 2026 | Nguyen Du Gymnasium, Ho Chi Minh City | |
| 2026 | GMMTV Fan Day 36 in Tokyo | October 2, 2026 | New Pier Hall, Tokyo | |
| 2026 | GMMTV Fan Day 37 in Paris | October 3, 2026 | Novotel Paris Est Centre de Conference, Paris | |
| 2026 | T-Pop Stage in Paris | October 3, 2026 | Novotel Paris Est Centre de Conference, Paris | |
| 2026 | Girl Rules Fan Meeting in Manila | October 3, 2026 | Function Room 3–5, SMX Convention Center Manila | |
| 2026 | Phuwin Fancon in Indonesia | October 3, 2026 | Bekasi Convention Center, Jakarta | |
| 2026 | TayNew & Polcasan Family Trip in Taipei | October 4, 2026 | Legacy TERA, Taipei | |
| 2026 | New Horizon: JuniorMark Fan Meeting in Vietnam | October 10, 2026 | C30 Hoa Binh Stage, Ho Chi Minh City | |
| 2026 | Enemies with Benefits Fan Meeting in Seoul | October 11, 2026 | Coex Artium, Seoul | |
| 2026 | Joong Fan Meeting in Malaysia | October 11, 2026 | JioSpace, Malaysia | |
| 2026 | PerthSanta Fan Meeting in Macau | October 17, 2026 | H853 Entertainment Place, Lisboeta Macau | |
| 2026 | Just You & Win: Win Fan Meeting in Hong Kong | October 17, 2026 | AXA Dreamland, Go Park | |
| 2026 | GMMTV Fan Day 38 in USA: Illinois | October 21, 2026 | Harris Theatre, Chicago | |
| 2026 | Blush Blossom Fan Fest: Midnight Bloom in Macau | October 24, 2026 | Fisherman's Wharf Convention & Exhibition Center | |
| 2026 | GMMTV Fan Day 38 in USA: Texas | October 25, 2026 | Woodlawn Theatre, San Antonio | |
| 2026 | JimmySea & Avocean Fan Meeting in Mexico | October 28, 2026 | Teatro Metropólitan | |
| 2026 | Halloween Time: TayNew & Polcasan Fan Meeting in Hong Kong | October 31, 2026 | Regala Skycity Hotel Grand Ballroom | |
| 2026 | GMMTV Fan Day 39 in Taipei | October 31, 2026 | Zepp New Taipei, Honhui Plaza | |
| 2026 | Just You & Win: Win Fan Meeting in Taipei | November 1, 2026 | Zepp New Taipei, Honhui Plaza | |
| 2026 | Blush Blossom Fan Fest: Midnight Bloom in Khaosiung | November 7, 2026 | Kaohsiung Music Center, Khaosiung | |
| 2026 | True Love Arrives: Perth & Domiia Fan Meeting in China | November 7, 2026 | China | |
| 2026 | Dreams Come True: Santa & Domiia Fan Meeting in China | November 8, 2026 | China | |
| 2026 | JuniorMark Fan Meeting in Manila | November 14, 2026 | Music Museum, Manila | |
| 2026 | BounPrem Fan Meeting in Seoul | November 15, 2026 | CCC Stage, Seoul | |
| 2026 | Midnight Reverie: BounPrem Fan Meeting in Macau | November 21, 2026 | Broadway Theatre, Broadway Macau | |
| 2026 | GMMTV Fan Event in Tokyo 2026 | December 4–6, 2026 | Animate Theatre, Tokyo | |
| 2026 | Enemies with Benefits Fan Meeting in Singapore | December 5, 2026 | D'Marquee, Downtown East | |
| 2026 | White Christmas 2026: TayNew & Polcasan Fan Meeting in Berlin | December 5, 2026 | Estrel Hotel, Berlin | |
| 2026 | White Christmas 2026: ForceBook Fan Meeting in Berlin | December 5, 2026 | Estrel Hotel, Berlin | |
| 2026 | My Love CEO: JoongDunk & Jaidee Fan Meeting in Hong Kong | December 5, 2026 | Nina Hotel Tsuen Wan West | |
| 2026 | Enemies with Benefits Fan Meeting in Hong Kong | December 12, 2026 | MacPherson Stadium, Hong Kong | |
| 2026 | White Christmas 2026: JimmySea Fan Meeting in Madrid | December 12, 2026 | Espacio Pablo IV Foundation | |
| 2026 | White Christmas 2026: MilkLove Fan Meeting in Madrid | December 12, 2026 | Espacio Pablo IV Foundation | |
| 2026 | ForceBook Fan Meeting in Manila | December 12, 2026 | Solaire North Ballroom, Solaire Resort | |
| 2026 | TayNew Fan Meeting in Manila | December 13, 2026 | Solaire North Ballroom, Solaire Resort | |
| 2026 | Double Trouble with Lunar: NamtanFilm & Lunar Fan Meeting in Ho Chi Minh City | December 13, 2026 | C30 Hoa Binh Stage, Ho Chi Minh City | |
| 2026 | TayNew & Polcasan Family Outing in Vietnam | December 19, 2026 | C30 Hoa Binh Stage, Ho Chi Minh City | |
| 2026 | JuniorMark Sunny Moon Fancon in Macau | December 19–20, 2026 | Broadway Theatre, Broadway Macau | |
| 2026 | Back To You: BounPrem Fan Meeting in Vietnam | December 20, 2026 | C30 Hoa Binh Stage, Ho Chi Minh City | |
| 2026 | Film & Lunar Fan Meeting in Kuala Lumpur | December 20, 2026 | JioSpace, Kuala Lumpur | |
| 2026 | Dew-Tee Fan Meeting in Taipei | December 27, 2026 | Zepp New Taipei, New Taipei | |
| 2027 | Enemies with Benefits Fan Meeting in Manila | January 5, 2027 | The Crossroad Center, Quezon City | |
| 2027 | FirstKhaotung Fan Meeting in Mexico | January 8, 2027 | Teatro Metropólitan | |
| 2027 | Devotion Across Miles: Pond Fan Meeting in Hong Kong | January 9, 2027 | Hong Kong, China | |
| 2027 | EmiBonnie Love Session Concert in Singapore | January 9–10, 2027 | Capitol Theatre, Singapore | |
| 2027 | Melody of Longing: Phuwin Fan Meeting in Hong Kong | January 10, 2027 | Hong Kong, China | |
| 2027 | FirstKhaotung Fan Meeting in São Paulo | January 10, 2027 | Terra SP, São Paulo | |
| 2027 | GMMTV Fan Fay 40 in USA: New York | January 10, 2027 | Webster Hall, New York City | |
| 2027 | GMMTV Fan Day 40 in USA: Colorado | January 13, 2027 | Boulder Theatre, Boulder | |
| 2027 | JIB Dream Fanmeet 9 | January 15–16, 2027 | Milton Rome Airport Hotel, Rome | |
| 2027 | GMMTV Fan Fay 40 in USA: Texas | January 16, 2027 | The Ridglea Theatre, Fort Worth | |
| 2027 | MilkLove Fan Meeting in Mexico | January 20, 2027 | Teatro Metropólitan | |
| 2027 | A Place to Belong: MilkLove Fan Meeting in Brazil | January 22, 2027 | Teatro Bandeirantes | |
| 2027 | Est & Wesley Fan Meeting in Kuala Lumpur | January 30, 2027 | ZEPP Kuala Lumpur | |
| 2027 | Sea & Avocean Fan Meeting in Kuala Lumpur | January 31, 2027 | ZEPP Kuala Lumpur | |
| 2027 | NamtanFilm Fan Meeting in Seoul | February 13, 2027 | Cube Convention Center, Seoul | |
| 2027 | GMMTV Fan Day 41 in Tokyo | February 13–14, 2027 | New Pier Hall, Tokyo | |
| 2027 | JossGawin Heat & Beat Fancon in Singapore | February 19, 2027 | Capitol Theatre, Singapore | |
| 2027 | Sky-Nani S to the N Fancon in Singapore | February 20, 2027 | Capitol Theatre, Singapore | |
| 2027 | GMMTV Fan Day 2027: Taipei | April 17–18, 2027 | Zepp New Taipei, Honhui Plaza | |

==== Cancelled events ====
| Year | Title | Scheduled Date(s) | Venue | Ref. |
|---|---|---|---|---|
| 2020 | KristSingto Fan Meeting in Chongqing | February 22, 2020 | ShiGuangNan Theatre | |
| 2023 | Dew Fan Meeting in Chengdu | October 28, 2023 | —N/a | |
| 2023 | Dew Fan Meeting in Nanjing | October 29, 2023 | —N/a | |
| 2023 | Dew Fan Meeting in Jakarta | December 2, 2023 | Kuningan City Ballroom | |
| 2024 | Ohm Fan Meeting in Manila | January 27, 2024 | Samsung Hall, SM Aura Premier | |
| 2024 | Ohm Fan Meeting in Korea | February 17, 2024 | Donghae Art Center Big theater, Kwangwoon University | |
| 2024 | Fuji Beats Festival | April 29, 2024 | Kawaguchiko Stellar Theater | |
| 2024 | Sunrise in Chongqing: Tay Fan Meeting in Chongqing | May 15, 2024 | Chongqing Super Live | |
| 2024 | Win Holidate Fancon in Nanning | August 3, 2024 | Nanning International Convention and Exhibition Center | |
| 2024 | Only Friends Fan Meeting in Manila | August 24, 2024 | New Frontier Theater | |
| 2024 | GeminiFourth Run The World Asia Tour: GeminiFourth Run The World in Hong Kong | December 29, 2024 | Runway 11, AsiaWorld-Expo | |
| 2026 | GMMTV Musicon: China | January 31, 2026 | China | |
| 2026 | Only Friends: Dream On Americas Tour: Only Friends: Dream On in Vancouver | September 4, 2026 | The Queen Elizabeth Theatre | |
| 2026 | Only Friends: Dream On Americas Tour: Only Friends: Dream On in Washington D.C. | September 6–7, 2026 (Note: rebranded as "JossGawin Fan Meeting in Washington D.C." held only on September 6, 2026) | The Howard Theatre | |

=== Virtual/Online ===
Events held in Thailand are directly organized by GMMTV and are made available to a global audience through the partner service.

| Year | Title | Date(s) | Partner | Ref. |
|---|---|---|---|---|
| 2020 | Global Live Fan Meeting: Krist & Singto | May 30, 2020 | V Live | |
| 2020 | Global Live Fan Meeting: Off & Gun | June 6, 2020 | V Live | |
| 2020 | Global Live Fan Meeting: Tay & New | June 13, 2020 | V Live | |
| 2020 | Global Live Fan Meeting: Bright & Win | June 20, 2020 | V Live | |
| 2020 | SOTUS The Reunion 4ever More | August 22, 2020 | V Live | |
| 2020 | Kun-Gu 2gether Live On Stage | October 18, 2020 | V Live | |
| 2020 | BrightWin Manila Live: The Virtual Fan Meet | December 5, 2020 | Dreamscape Entertainment | |
| 2021 | Tonhon Chonlatee Let's Sea Live Fan Meeting | February 27, 2021 | TTM LIVE | |
| 2021 | Earth - Mix Love at 1st Live Fan Meeting | June 26, 2021 | TTM LIVE | |
| 2021 | Fish Upon the Sky Live Fan Meeting: A Sky Full of Fish | September 4, 2021 | TTM LIVE | |
| 2021 | Bright Win 1st Fan Meeting in Japan | October 9, 2021 | PIA LIVE STREAM | |
| 2022 | Polca The Journey: Tay & New 1st Fan Meeting in Thailand | June 25, 2022 | TTM LIVE | |
| 2022 | Shooting Star Concert | July 23, 2022 | TTM LIVE | |
| 2022 | O-N Friend City Ohm - Nanon 1st Fan Meeting in Thailand | August 6, 2022 | TTM LIVE | |
| 2022 | Love Out Loud Fan Fest 2022 | August 20, 2022 | TTM LIVE | |
| 2022 | GMMTV Fan Fest 2022 Live in Japan | August 27–28, 2022 | PIA LIVE STREAM | |
| 2022 | Feel Fan Fun Camping Concert | October 15, 2022 | TTM LIVE | |
| 2022 | 7 Xian Concert | November 19, 2022 | AIS Play | |
| 2022 | Side by Side Bright Win Concert | December 24, 2022 | TTM LIVE; SF Cinema | |
| 2023 | My School President Prom Night Live On Stage | March 18–19, 2023 | TTM LIVE | |
| 2023 | Beluca Fourtiverse Concert | May 20, 2023 | TTM LIVE | |
| 2023 | Love Out Loud Fan Fest 2023: Lovolution | June 24–25, 2023 | TTM LIVE | |
| 2023 | GMMTV Musicon | July 29–30, 2023 | PIA LIVE STREAM | |
| 2023 | GMMTV Fan Day 6 in Seoul | August 20, 2023 | hellolive | |
| 2023 | GMMTV Fan Day 6 in Seoul | October 28, 2023 (Note: Shows scheduled for August 19 were rescheduled to October 28) | hellolive | |
| 2023 | Gemini Fourth My Turn Concert | August 26–27, 2023 | TTM LIVE | |
| 2023 | GMMTV Fanday in Bangkok | September 22–24, 2023 | TTM LIVE | |
| 2023 | The Krist Elements Concert | October 21–22, 2023 | TTM LIVE | |
| 2023 | GMMTV Starlympic | December 23, 2023 (Note: originally scheduled for July 22, 2023) | TTM LIVE | |
| 2024 | Win Holidate Fancon Presented by Lazada | February 17, 2024 | TTM LIVE | |
| 2024 | GMMTV Happy Weekend | February 23–25, 2024 | PIA LIVE STREAM | |
| 2024 | Nanon born to BEO Concert | March 23, 2024 | TTM LIVE | |
| 2024 | Last Twilight New Dawn Live On Stage | March 30, 2024 | TTM LIVE | |
| 2024 | Babii 24/7 Concert | April 20, 2024 | TTM LIVE | |
| 2024 | Polca Time Traveling Concert | April 27, 2024 | TTM LIVE | |
| 2024 | Love Out Loud Fan Fest 2024: The Love Pirates | May 18–19, 2024 (Note: originally scheduled for May 24, 2024) | TTM LIVE | |
| 2024 | Peraya Party Begin Again | June 15, 2024 | TTM LIVE | |
| 2024 | Bouncy Boun Concert | July 13, 2024 | TTM LIVE | |
| 2024 | We Are Forever Fancon | August 16–17, 2024 | TTM LIVE | |
| 2024 | Gemini Fourth Run The World Concert | August 31 – September 1, 2024 | TTM LIVE | |
| 2024 | LYKN Unleashed Concert | September 21, 2024 | The Concert | |
| 2024 | GMMTV Fanday in Bangkok 2024 | November 30 – December 1, 2024 | TTM LIVE | |
| 2024 | GMMTV Starlympics 2024 | December 21, 2024 | TTM LIVE | |
| 2025 | The Heart Killers: Never Back Down Final EP. Fan Party | February 12, 2025 | TTM LIVE | |
| 2025 | Sky-Nani Frienomenon Fancon | February 15–16, 2025 | TTM LIVE | |
| 2025 | ThamePo Our Last Beat Fan Party | March 7, 2025 | TTM LIVE | |
| 2025 | Namtan Film Princess's Tale Fan Meeting | March 8–9, 2025 | TTM LIVE | |
| 2025 | PEBACA What A Concert | March 22, 2025 | TTM LIVE | |
| 2025 | Perfect 10 Liners Bye Nior Fan Party | April 6, 2025 | TTM LIVE | |
| 2025 | Perfect 10 Liners Bye Nior After Party | April 7, 2025 | TTM LIVE | |
| 2025 | Love Out Loud Fan Fest 2025: Lovemosphere | May 17–18, 2025 | TTM LIVE | |
| 2025 | Blush Blossom Fan Fest | June 28–29, 2025 | TTM LIVE | |
| 2025 | Perth Santa Time Stopper Fancon | July 19–20, 2025 | TTM LIVE | |
| 2025 | William Est We Magnetic Fancon | August 9–10, 2025 | TTM LIVE | |
| 2025 | Junior Mark Shine Rise Fancon | August 11–12, 2025 | TTM LIVE | |
| 2025 | Gemini Fourth A.W.A.K.E Concert | August 30–31, 2025 | TTM LIVE | |
