= Honhui Plaza =

Shopping mall in Xinzhuang, New Taipei, Taiwan

- 宏匯廣場

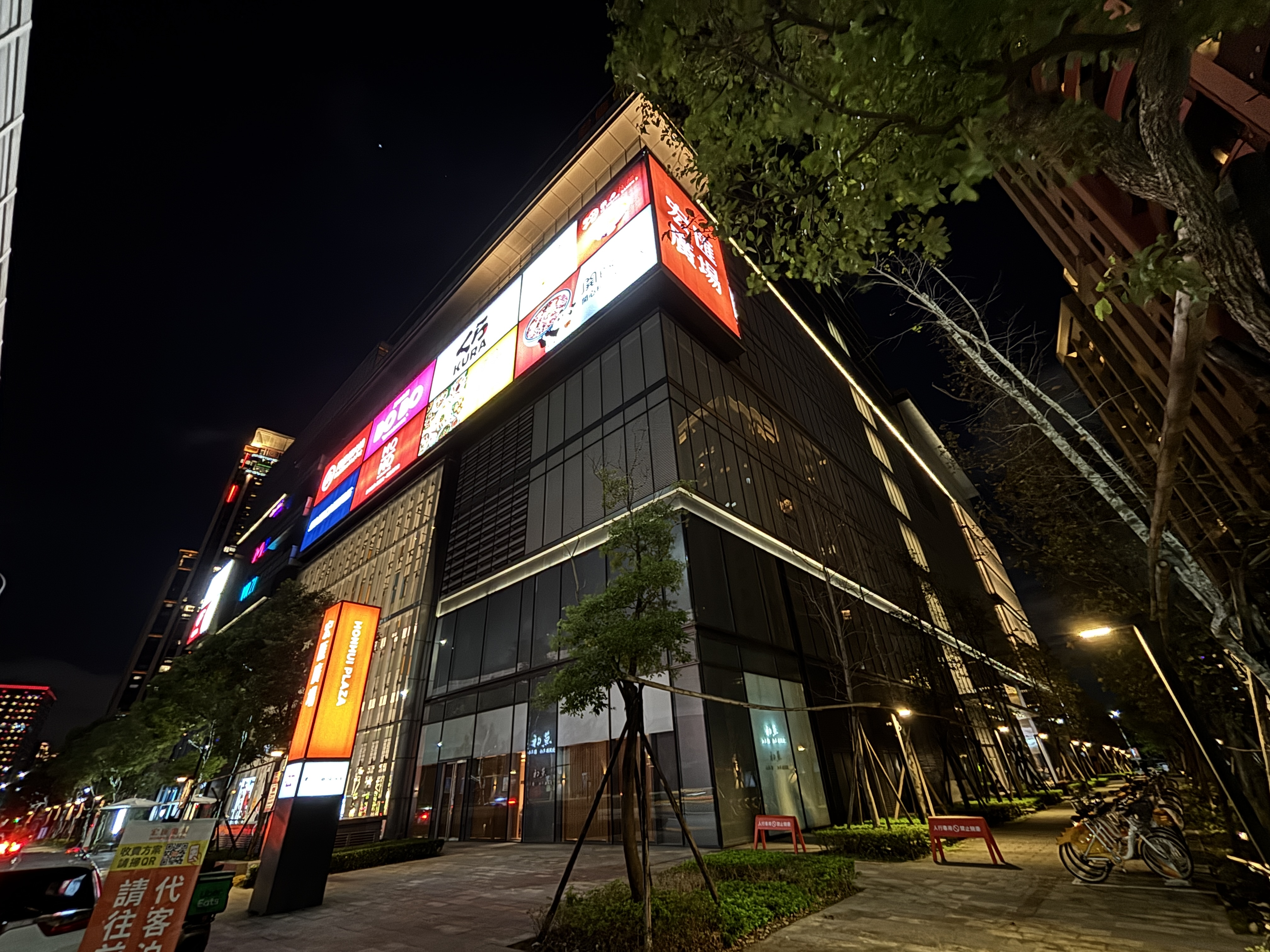
- Location: No. 3, Section 4, New Taipei Boulevard, Xinzhuang District, New Taipei, Taiwan
- Coordinates: 25°3′36″N 121°26′58″E
- Opened: September 26, 2020
- Owner: Honhui Group
- Floor area: 171,507.45 m^{2} (1,846,090.8 sq ft)
- Floors: 14 floors above ground 7 floors below ground
- Parking: 1274
- Public transit: Xinzhuang Fuduxin metro station
- Website: www.honhui.com.tw

Honhui Plaza (Chinese: 宏匯廣場; pinyin: Hóng Hùi guǎngchǎng) is a shopping center in Xinzhuang District, New Taipei, Taiwan that opened on September 26, 2020. It is the largest shopping mall in the district.

== History ==
- March 31, 2017: Groundbreaking ceremony was held.
- March 29, 2019: The beam raising ceremony was held.
- July 31, 2020: Honhui Plaza began trial operation.
- September 26, 2020: Honhui Plaza officially opened.

== Floor Guide ==
Levels 12 - 14	Office Space	Offices
Level 11	Honhui Space	Event venue
Level 10	Service Center	Miranew Cinemas, Customer Service
Level 9	Entertainment Base	VR Zone
Level 8	Entertainment Base	ZEPP NEW TAIPEI, themed restaurants
Level 7	Food Court	Food court, Restaurants
Level 6	Home Furnishings	Home electronics, beddings, kitchen appliances, restaurants
Level 5	Children's World	Baby products, children's clothes, toys, ladies' lingerie, rock climbing park, Uniqlo
Level 4	Sports & Leisure	Sports, men's fashion
Level 3	Young Collection	Women's fashion, denim collection
Level 2	Modern Fashion	Muji, women's fashion, women's shoes, jewellery
Level 1	Fashion Avenue	Cosmetics, international brands, car brands, cafe
B1	Parking Lot	Parking spaces for motorbikes
B2	Supermarket	Supermarket, souvenir shop, restaurant, car park
B3-B7	Parking Lot	Car park

== Gallery ==
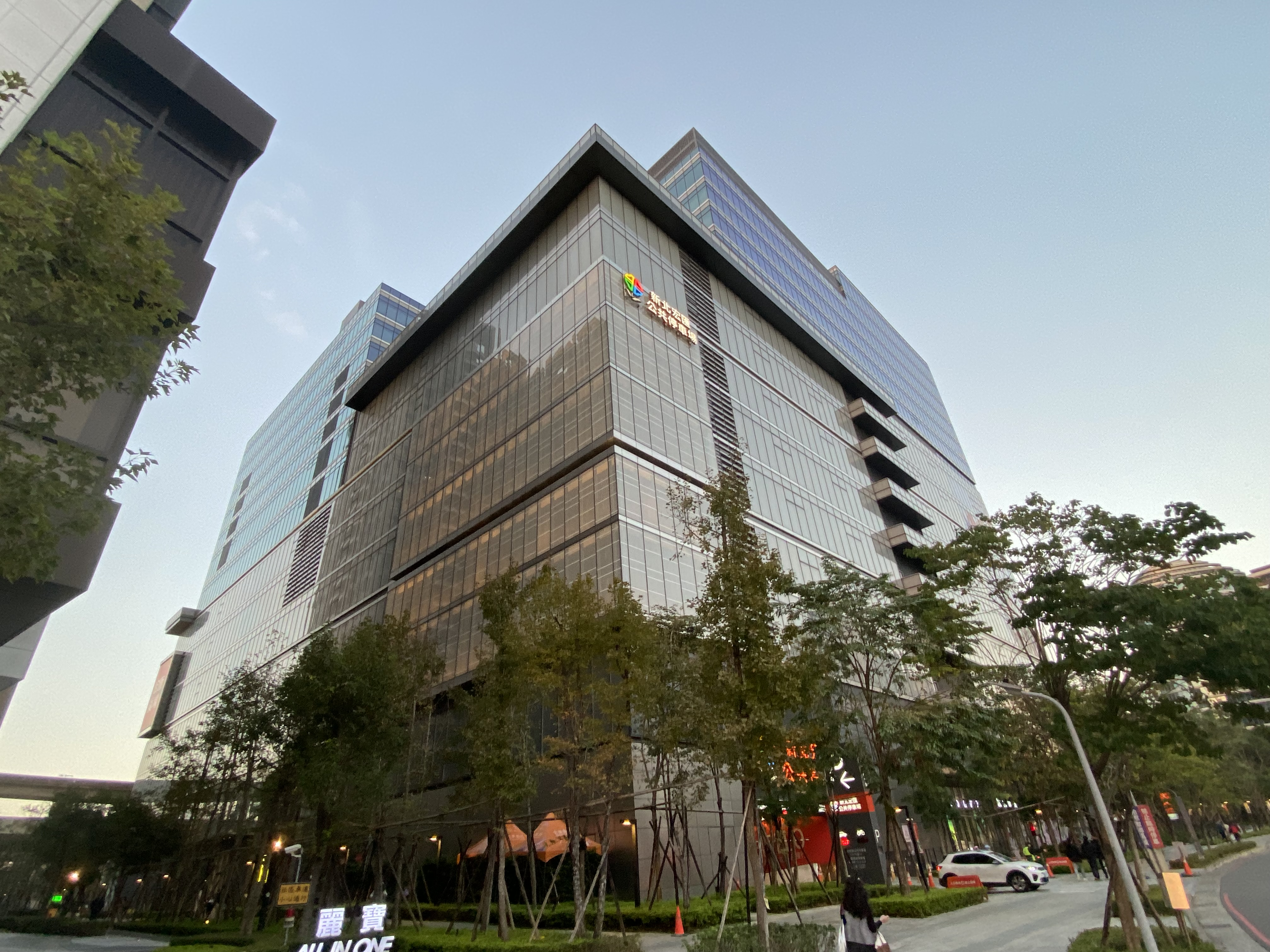
Car park

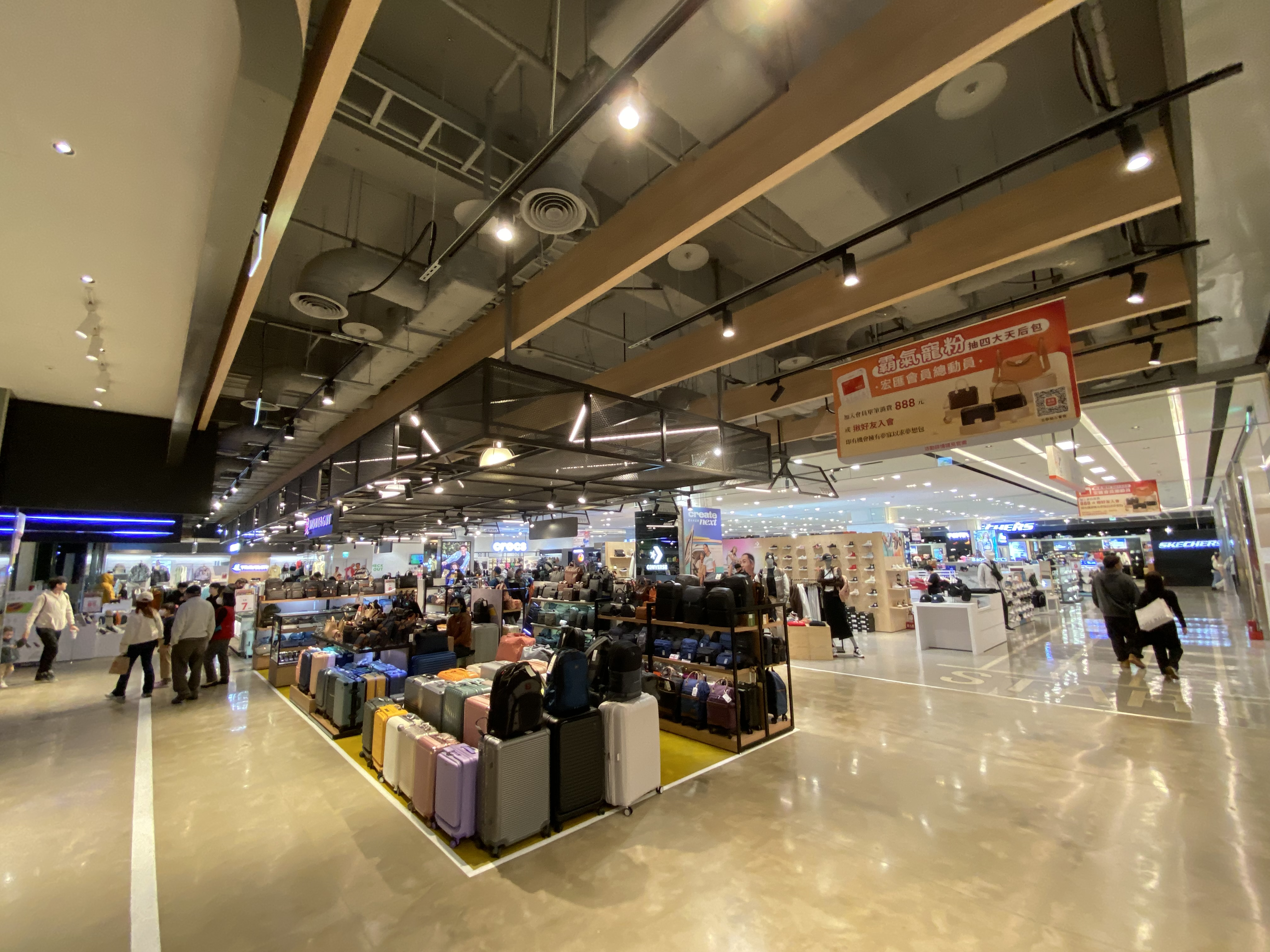
Level 4 Interior

== See also ==
- List of tourist attractions in Taiwan
