= Nattawat Jirochtikul =

Thai actor and singer (born 2004)

- ณัฐวรรธน์ จิโรชน์ธิกุล
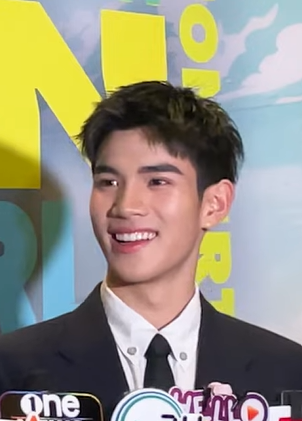
- Nattawat in September 2024
- Born: 18 October 2004 (age 22); Bangkok, Thailand
- Other names: Fourth Nattawat, Fourth
- Education: Saint Gabriel's College: Chulalongkorn University
- Occupations: Actor; singer; model; CEO
- Years active: 2019–present
- Agent: GMMTV
- Known for: Gun in My School President; Li Ming in Moonlight Chicken; Tanrak in Ticket to Heaven
- Height: 1.78 m (5 ft 10 in)
- Musical career
- Genres: Pop; T-pop
- Instruments: Vocals; guitar
- Label: Riser Music

Nattawat Jirochtikul (Thai: ณัฐวรรธน์ จิโรชน์ธิกุล; born 18 October 2004), nicknamed Fourth (Thai: โฟร์ท), is a Thai actor under GMMTV and a singer signed to Riser Music. He began his career after winning the talent competition Thailand School Star 2019. In 2021, he made his acting debut as Glakao in F4 Thailand: Boys Over Flowers, the Thai adaptation of the Japanese manga series Boys Over Flowers. He rose to prominence for his lead role as Gun in the popular television series My School President (2022) and as Li Ming in Moonlight Chicken (2023). He also starred as Tanrak in Ticket to Heaven (2026) and as Prince Jom Harn in Scarlet Heart Ullavee (2026).

== Early life and education ==
Nattawat was born on 18 October 2004 in Bangkok, Thailand. He was nicknamed Fourth as he was born on King Rama IV's 200th birthday and because he is considered by his mother to be her fourth child, having experienced loss from her three previous pregnancies. He is the eldest child and has one younger sister. His father was of Thai Chinese descent. His mother, known as Mae Pui (แม่ปุ๋ย), is from the Isan province of Sakon Nakhon.

Fourth shared that his mother wanted him to become a star ever since he was a child. As far as he could remember, she would take him to auditions since kindergarten (Anuban 3), but he often missed out due to being camera shy. He appeared in an advertisement for a ginger drink at the age of three. He aspired to work in the entertainment industry because he dreamed of being able to take care of his family.

Fourth was actively involved in school when he attended Saint Gabriel's College, participating in many different extracurricular activities, including having been captain of his school's football team. Fourth shared that his father used to take him to play the sport since he was in kindergarten. He also performed in the school stage play called Sombat Mom Chuli: The Musical (สมบัติหม่อมชุลี เดอะ มิวสิคัล).

He graduated from Saint Gabriel's College early by taking the grade twelve equivalency test (GED) when he was in the tenth grade (Matthayom 4). He then took time off from his studies to focus on his career. He later enrolled in university around the same time as his peers.

He is currently pursuing an international program, Bachelor of Laws, experiential learning in Business and Technology Law (LLBel) at Chulalongkorn University.

== Career ==
=== 2019–2021: Career beginnings ===
At the age of fourteen, Fourth participated in Smart Boy 2019, a modelling contest hosted in conjunction with Thai Supermodel Contest 2019 by Channel 7 HD. He was scouted for his first commercial gig for the telecom company DTAC.

At the age of fifteen, Fourth joined GMMTV's reality contest Thailand School Star 2019. During the talent show, he performed a Muay Thai dance (Thai: รำมวยไทย ram muai thai), highlighting his athleticism. He also met Norawit Titicharoenrak (Gemini), who would become his future acting partner. Fourth and Preeyaphat Lawsuwansiri (Earn) were chosen as the winners, both signing an exclusive contract with GMMTV.

Fourth made his television debut in the role of Glakao Jundee, the younger brother of Gorya, played by Tontawan Tantivejakul, in F4 Thailand: Boys Over Flowers (2021).

=== 2022–2023: Breakthrough with My School President and Moonlight Chicken ===
Fourth starred in his first lead role in the boys' love series My School President (2022), as Gun, who is the leader of his high school music club and the love interest of the student council president, Tinn, played by Gemini. The show takes a musical approach by incorporating songs performed by the cast into the storytelling. Fourth began taking singing lessons for his role, sharing that he went from being shy and feeling awkward singing in front of a crowd, to enjoying performing and singing along with fans. Fourth later reprised his role as Gun in May 2023 in two episodes of the anthology series Our Skyy 2.

While My School President was still ongoing, Moonlight Chicken aired in early 2023, where Fourth played Li Ming, the nephew of Uncle Jim (Pirapat Watthanasetsiri) and the love interest of Heart, also played by Gemini.

The explosive popularity of My School President and Moonlight Chicken propelled Gemini and Fourth to significant fame and the duo quickly became popular as "GeminiFourth". Their fandom was given the name "Khunnoo" (คุณหนู), a title used to address a 'young master', heard in episode 4 of My School President. The cast of My School President went on to perform live on stage and met fans across Asia. Gemini and Fourth also gained recognition for their roles, receiving awards such as Popular Couple Artists at the Golden Kinnaree Awards, Hottest Artist Award at the Kazz Awards, Breakthrough Actors from GQ Men of the Year 2023, and Thai Best Artist at the 33rd Seoul Music Awards.

In March 2023, following the success of My School President, Gemini and Fourth went on to further establish themselves as artists with the release of their single "เขินให้หน่อย (You're Blushing?)", a city pop track co-produced by Now of Mirrr and songwriter Third of Tilly Birds. In August, Fourth released his first solo single "อยู่เฉย ๆ ก็น่ารัก (Please Be Mine)".

In June 2023, Fourth and Gemini participated in the Love Out Loud Fan Fest 2023: Lovolution concert alongside other GMMTV artists. In August, they headlined their first concert together, Gemini Fourth My Turn Concert. Due to overwhelming interest in concert tickets, a second date was added.

=== 2024–2025: Riser Music, My Love Mix-Up! and Run the World Concert tour ===
Fourth was revealed as a new artist under Riser Music in February 2024. In March, he released his single "เทคะแนน (Candidate)" under the new label. Fourth went on to collaborate with rapper UrboyTJ, who produced his single "ง้อ (Alright)", released in August. He also worked with songwriter Kow of Fellow Fellow for his slow-pop single "ซึมซับ (Doubtless)", released in March 2025. In August 2025, Gemini and Fourth released their pop R&B duet "เรียกว่ารักได้ไหม (Is This Love?)". In September, Fourth released his single "Side to Side", featuring Mabelz of Pixxie, produced by singer-songwriter Hye of Paper Planes.

On 27 March 2024, Gemini and Fourth released their design of My Ideal Fan, named "Look Khunnoo" (ลูกคุณหนู), which would become their fandom mascot and make appearances at fan events.

Fourth was originally set to appear alongside Gemini in the girls' love series 23.5 (2024), but in July 2023, it was announced that they had withdrawn from the series in order to prepare for their roles in a new series. Gemini and Fourth went on to star in My Love Mix-Up! (2024), which premiered on 7 June 2024. They also performed on the soundtrack for the series, where their opening theme song, "ลบยัง (Re-Move On)", won Best Theme Song at the Asian Academy Creative Awards, Y Entertain Awards, and Y Universe Awards.

In addition to participating in the Love Out Loud Fan Fest 2024: The Love Pirates concert in May 2024, Gemini and Fourth went on to headline their Run the World Concert at the Impact Arena on 31 August and 1 September 2024, showcasing their wide range of abilities, including singing, dancing and rope acrobatics. GMMTV announced that the duo would embark on the Run the World Asia Tour, continuing in Ho Chi Minh City in October and concluding on 29 June 2025 in Osaka.

Following the conclusion of the Run the World Asia Tour, Gemini and Fourth returned to the Impact Arena for their AI-themed A.W.A.K.E Concert on 30 and 31 August 2025.

=== 2026–present: Ticket to Heaven, Kijsada Paradise, Scarlet Heart Ullavee, The Love of Siam: The Musical ===
Gemini and Fourth performed at the Riser Concert: The First Rise, held at the Impact Arena on 13–15 February 2026. In April 2026, Fourth released his single "Every Single Day". Gemini and Fourth returned to the Impact Arena to perform at the Love Out Loud Fan Fest 2026: Heart Race concert on 22–24 May 2026.

Fourth and Gemini starred in the television series Ticket to Heaven (2026). Fourth played Tanrak, a devout student at a Catholic seminary who becomes conflicted when his sexuality, faith, and religion clash upon developing feelings for the new student Barth, played by Gemini. Fourth won Boys' Love Actor of the Year at the Feed x Khaosod Awards 2026 for his role as Tanrak.

Fourth starred in the comedy horror film Kijsada Paradise (2026), directed by Mike Phontharis Chotkijsadarsopon, appearing alongside Yorch Yongsin. Fourth played the lead role of Taek, the leader of a group of friends who venture into an abandoned water park to play hide-and-seek, leading to the mysterious disappearance of one of their friends.

Fourth held his first solo concert called Oh My Fourth Concert at BITEC Live on 16–18 October 2026. He also went on to star as Prince Jom Harn in Scarlet Heart Ullavee, which premiered on 4 November 2026.

Gemini and Fourth are also set to play the lead roles of Tong and Mew in the upcoming musical adaptation of the 2007 film Love of Siam. The musical is scheduled to premiere at the Muangthai Rachadalai Theatre in December 2026.

=== Personal ventures ===
In February 2023, Fourth ventured into entrepreneurship with his own clothing line, Numone. The name comes from the combination of nu from Thai หนู nu, mo from English mouse, and ne from Japanese 鼠 nezumi, each meaning 'mouse'. The word หนู nu, can also be used as a pronoun to refer to a younger person, giving the brand name a feeling of youthful brightness. The name can also be reinterpreted as num and one, as in number one.

== Personal life ==
On 19 April 2025, his father, "Plodpai" Jutinat Jirochtikul, died. Fourth was temporarily ordained as a Buddhist monk, through the practice known as buat na fai (บวชหน้าไฟ), as a way to make merit for his father, on the day of his father's cremation ceremony at Wat Makut Kasattriyaram.

== Discography ==
=== Singles ===
==== As lead artist ====
Year	Title	Ref.
2023	"อยู่เฉย ๆ ก็น่ารัก (Please Be Mine)"	
2024	"เทคะแนน (Candidate)"	
2024	"ง้อ (Alright)"	
2025	"ซึมซับ (Doubtless)"	
2025	"Side to Side" (feat. Mabelz Pixxie)	
2026	"อยู่ด้วยกันนะ (Every Single Day)"	
2026	"ไม่ไหวแล้ว (Officially)" (feat. Jaokhun)	

==== Collaborations ====
Year	Title	Notes
2023	"เขินให้หน่อย (You're Blushing?)" (with Gemini Norawit)	
2023	"กอด กอด (Hugs)" (with Off, Gun, Tay, New, Pond, Phuwin, Gemini, Perth, Chimon)	
2024	"You're My Treasure" (with Earth, Mix, Pond, Phuwin, First, Khaotung, Joong, Dunk, Gemini, Perth, Chimon, Force, Book, Jimmy, Sea, Winny, Satang)	Love Out Loud Fan Fest 2024
2025	"จองตั๋วแล้วจองตัวเธอด้วยได้ปะ (Love Ticket)" (with Tay, Nanon, Gemini)	SF Super Friends
2025	"Nekko มาดูแมวบ้านเราไหม?" (with UrboyTJ, Gemini)	Nekko Cat Food
2025	"เรียกว่ารักได้ไหม (Is This Love?)" (with Gemini Norawit)	
2026	"Love Feels So Fast" (with Earth, Mix, Pond, Phuwin, First, Khaotung, Joong, Dunk, Gemini, Perth, Santa, Force, Book, Jimmy, Sea, Boun, Prem, William, Est, Junior, Mark, Joss, Gawin)	Love Out Loud Fan Fest 2026

==== Soundtrack appearances ====
Year	Title	Album	Notes
2022	"อยากร้องดังดัง (I Want to Scream Out Loud)" (Cover) (Original by Palmy) (with Ford Arun)	My School President OST	
2022	"น้ำลาย (Saliva)" (Cover) (Original by Silly Fools) (with Ford Arun)	My School President OST	
2022	"ข้างกัน (City)" (Cover) (Original by Three Man Down) (with Gemini Norawit)	My School President OST	
2022	"ไหล่เธอ (You've Got Ma Back)" (with Ford, Satang, Winny)	My School President OST	
2023	"ฟัง (Listen)" (Cover) (Original by SIN feat. โอม Cocktail) (with Ford, Satang, Winny feat. Lookwa Pijika)	My School President OST	
2023	"เพื่อนเล่นไม่เล่นเพื่อน (Just Being Friendly)" (Cover) (Original by Tilly Birds feat. Milli)	My School President OST	Ep. 6 (with Ford and Satang); Ep. 8 (Solo Version)
2023	"ง้อว (Smile Please)" (with Gemini, Ford, Satang, Winny, Mark, Captain, Prom)	My School President OST	
2023	"พูดได้ไหม (Let Me Tell You)"	My School President OST	
2023	"รักษา (Healing)" (with Gemini, Ford, Satang)	My School President OST	
2023	"ก้อนหินกับดวงดาว (Rock & Star)"	My School President OST	
2023	"แค่ครั้งเดียว (Once Upon a Time)" (with Gemini, Ford, Satang)	My School President OST	
2023	"The Moon Represents My Heart" (Cover) (with Earth, Mix, First, Khaotung, Gemini)	Moonlight Chicken OST	
2023	"รักคู่ขนาน (Multi-Love)" (with Gemini, Winny, Satang, Mark, Ford)	Our Skyy 2 OST	
2024	"ลบยัง (Re-Move On)" (with Gemini Norawit)	My Love Mix-Up! OST	
2024	"ว้าวุ่นเลย (Whenever I See You)"	My Love Mix-Up! OST	
2024	"ใครคนนั้น (Among Many People)"	My Love Mix-Up! OST	
2024	"ดั่งวาดฝันเสมอมา (It's You)" (with Gemini Norawit)	My Love Mix-Up! OST	
2026	"ถ้าสวรรค์ไม่มีเธอฉันก็ไม่อยากไป (Heavenly)" (with Gemini Norawit)	Ticket to Heaven OST	
2026	"ดังในใจ (Rain Fall)"	Ticket to Heaven OST	

== Filmography ==
=== Film ===
Year	Title	Role	Notes	Ref.
2023	Nednari	Tae	Main role	
2025	Elio	Workko	Voice role, Thai version	
2026	Kijsada Paradise	Taek	Main role	

=== Television series ===
Key
†	Denotes television productions that have not yet been released

Year	Title	Role	Network	Notes	Ref.
2021	F4 Thailand: Boys Over Flowers	Glakao	GMM 25	Supporting role	
2021	Bad Buddy	Student	GMM 25	Guest role (Ep. 10)	
2022	My School President	"Gun" Guntaphon Wongwitthaya	GMM 25	Main role	
2023	Moonlight Chicken	"Li Ming" Lertpong Nuengnauam	GMM 25	Supporting role	
2023	Our Skyy 2	"Gun" Guntaphon Wongwitthaya	GMM 25	Ep. 9–10, My School President	
2024	My Love Mix-Up!	"Atom" Achira Sophonpatima	GMM 25	Main role	
2026	Me and Thee	Himself	GMM 25	Cameo (Ep. 10)	
2026	Ticket to Heaven	Tanrak Sawatdirakkul	GMM 25	Main role	
2026	Scarlet Heart Ullavee	Jom Harn, Prince Rajaputra	One 31	Supporting role	
TBA	Pie and the 7 Witches †	Pie	TBA	Main role	
TBA	The Halo †	Kin	TBA	Main role	

=== Television show ===
Year	Title	Network	Notes
2019	Model TV	Channel 7 HD	Smart Boy 2019
2019	Thailand School Star 2019	GMMTV	
2019	Tred Tray Fest with Tay Tawan	GMMTV	Ep. 13
2020	STEAM Gen เกมวัดกึ๋น	ALTV	25 September 2020
2021	เจนจัด ก๊อตจิก Up Level Special	GMMTV	31 October 2021
2021	Talk with Toeys - โคตร ซ่อน แอบ!	GMM 25	Ep. 34
2022	รุ่นนี้ต้องรอด Young Survivors	GMMTV	Ep. 1
2022	EMS Earth-Mix Space	GMMTV	Ep. 19
2022	Safe House Season 4	GMMTV	
2022	Arm Share	GMMTV	Ep. 108, 113, 115
2022	School Rangers	GMM 25	Ep. 242–244
2022	Sound Check	One 31	Ep. 193 (28 December 2022)
2023	Project Alpha Special	GMM 25	
2023	LittleBigWorld with Pond Phuwin	GMMTV	Ep. 12
2023	OffGun Fun Night	GMMTV	Special 9
2023	School Rangers	GMM 25	Ep. 255–257, 261
2023	EMS Earth-Mix Space SS2	GMMTV	Ep. 4
2023	คู่มันส์ Fun Day	True4U	5 March 2023
2023	Once Upon a Time with Tay Tawan by Lactasoy	GMMTV	Ep. 8
2023	The Wall Song	Workpoint TV	Ep. 139 (4 May 2023)
2023	คุณพระช่วย Khun Pra Chuay	Workpoint TV	14 May 2023
2023	เปรี้ยวปาก Preawpak	Channel 3	Ep. 183 (17 June 2023)
2023	Talk with Toeys	GMM 25	Ep. 114
2023	Missionทำด้วยใจ – Mission Done with Heart	GMMTV	Ep. 1–4, 6, 10
2023	A Free Meal Chance – May Pepsi Treat You?	GMMTV	
2023	Arm Share	GMMTV	Ep. 130
2023	I Can See Your Voice Thailand	Workpoint TV	Season 6, Ep. 15
2023	โตมาเป็น Grow Up to Be	One Playground	Ep. 2
2023	TayNew Meal Date	GMMTV	Special Ep. 16
2023	กระหายเล่า Krahai Lao	GMMTV	Special 2
2024	Wow Match! ทีมพ่อวัลลภ vs ทีม GMMTV All Star	GMMTV	
2024	The Wall Song	Workpoint TV	Ep. 186 (28 March 2024)
2024	Pepsi Friend Feast Guide with Gemini-Fourth	GMMTV	
2024	Arm Share	GMMTV	Ep. 152, 155, 169
2024	Piano & I	TorBright Channel	Ep. 88
2024	Chairs to Share	The Standard Pop	Ep. 38
2024	Talk with Toeys	GMM 25	Ep. 162
2024	Brand's Brain Camp	GMMTV	
2024	EMS Earth-Mix Space Special	GMMTV	Ep. 2
2024	School Rangers	GMM 25	Ep. 25, 30–31
2024	High Season แคมป์ซ่าฮาทุกฤดู Season 2 Rainy	One 31, GMMTV	Ep. 2–4
2024	Thailand Music Countdown	Channel 3	Ep. 20 (22 September 2024)
2024	T-Pop Stage Show	Workpoint TV	17 October 2024
2025	The Mask Soulmate	Workpoint TV	Ep. 5, 9
2025	The Unexpected Trip ไปไม่หวัง ปังไม่ไหว by Nivea	GMMTV	
2025	Pepsi Friend Feast Guide with Gemini-Fourth Season 2	GMMTV	
2025	รอบวัน Rop Wan	One 31	Ep. 432 (19 March 2025), Ep. 566 (29 September 2025)
2025	Sound Check 2025	One 31	Ep. 6 (8 April 2025)
2025	FriendEd 101	GMMTV	Ep. 7
2025	Arm Share	GMMTV	Ep. 180, 187
2025	LittleBigWorld with Pond Phuwin	GMMTV	Ep. 15
2025	แฉ Chae	GMM 25	3 July 2025
2025	แสบ Save แสน Season 2	GMMTV	
2025	Thailand Music Countdown	Channel 3	Ep. 23 (19 October 2025), Ep. 31 (21 December 2025)
2025	Lemon8 เปิดมุมลับกับเจมโฟร์ท Uncover the Secrets with GemFourth	GMMTV	
2026	กี้ซดโอปโซ้ย Ki Sot Op Soi	One 31	18 January 2026
2026	รอบวัน Rop Wan	One 31	Ep. 675 (16 March 2026), Ep. 721 (25 May 2026), Ep. 732 (9 June 2026)
2026	T-Pop Stage	Workpoint TV	7 May 2026
2026	เฮ็ดอย่างเซียนหรั่ง Het Yang Sian Rang	One Playground	Ep. 87 (17 May 2026)
2026	Based on 2 Stories	GMMTV	Ep. 10
2026	Hone Krasae	Channel 3	18 September 2026
2026	The Celebrities	TrueID	Ep. 12 (2 October 2026)
2026	The Wall Song	Workpoint TV	Ep. 318 (8 October 2026), Ep. 322 (5 November 2026)
2026	วันนี้ Today	One 31	20 October 2026
2026	แฉ Chae	GMM 25	20 October 2026

=== Theatre ===
Year	Date	Title	Role	Venue	Notes	Ref.
2026	11–25 December	The Love of Siam: The Musical	Mew	Muangthai Rachadalai Theatre	Main role	

=== Web series ===
Year	Title	Role	Notes	Ref.
2025	The Racing Track เพราะเรา... สนามนี้ไม่มีแพ้	Bodyguard	Friends of Grab	
2025	Bites of Promise	Folk	Bonchon Chicken	

=== Music video appearances ===
Year	Title	Artist(s)	Ref.
2022	"อีกนิด (Come Closer)"	Ford Arun	
2023	"เพลงรัก (Hook)"	Gemini Norawit	
2024	"ไม่เป็นฉัน (What I'm Looking For)"	Gemini Norawit	
2024	"ไม่รู้ว่ามันเรียกว่ารักหรือเปล่า? (You've Been on My Mind)"	Gemini Norawit	
2024	"Oh My!"	Ally	
2026	"กฤษดา"	Sprite	
2026	"แทนรัก (Tanrak)"	Gemini Norawit	

== Live performances ==
Year	Date	Name	Venue	Notes	Ref.
2023	8 February	Opening Night Moonlight Chicken	Ballroom Hall 1–2, Queen Sirikit National Convention Center		
2023	2 March	Moonlight Chicken Final Ep. Fan Meeting	True Icon Hall, Iconsiam		
2023	18–19 March	My School President Prom Night Live On Stage	Union Hall, Union Mall		
2023	24–25 June	Love Out Loud Fan Fest 2023: Lovolution	Royal Paragon Hall		
2023	26–27 August	Gemini Fourth My Turn Concert	Impact Arena		
2023	9 October	GMMTV Fan Fest 2023 Live in Japan	Pia Arena MM		
2023	10 December	Big Mountain Music Festival 2023	The Ocean Khao Yai, Nakhon Ratchasima		
2023	16 December	GMMTV Musicon in Jakarta	Grand Ballroom, Pullman Jakarta Central Park		
2023	23 December	GMMTV Starlympic 2023	Impact Arena		
2024	25 February	GMMTV Happy Weekend	Tachikawa Stage Garden, Tokyo		
2024	20 April	Babii 24/7 Concert	Union Hall, Union Mall	Guest appearance	
2024	18–19 May	Love Out Loud Fan Fest 2024: The Love Pirates	Impact Arena		
2024	31 August – 1 September	Gemini Fourth Run the World Concert	Impact Arena		
2024	5 October	GMMTV Musicon in Cambodia	Naba Theatre, NagaWorld2, Phnom Penh		
2024	6 October	Sawasdee Seoul Thai Festival 2024	Cheonggye Plaza, Seoul		
2024	19 October	Gemini Fourth Run the World Asia Tour	Hoa Binh Theater, Ho Chi Minh City		
2024	9 November	Gemini Fourth Run the World Asia Tour	Taipei International Convention Center		
2024	8 December	Big Mountain Music Festival 2024	The Ocean Khao Yai, Nakhon Ratchasima		
2024	21 December	GMMTV Starlympics 2024	Impact Arena		
2025	5 January	GMMTV Musicon in Nanning	Guangxi Sports Center Gymnasium		
2025	13 January	GMMTV Fan Fest 2025 Live in Japan	Tokyo Garden Theater		
2025	25 January	Gemini Fourth Run the World Asia Tour	SM Sky Dome, SM North EDSA		
2025	8 March	Gemini Fourth Run the World Asia Tour	The Theatre at Mediacorp, Singapore		
2025	30 March	Gemini Fourth Run the World Asia Tour	Broadway Theatre, Broadway Macau		
2025	2 April	Gemini Fourth First US Tour	Miramar Cultural Center, Miramar, Florida		
2025	4 April	Gemini Fourth First US Tour	SVA Theatre, New York City		
2025	9 April	Gemini Fourth 1st Fan Meeting in Mexico	Teatro Metropólitan, Mexico City		
2025	17–18 May	Love Out Loud Fan Fest 2025: Lovemosphere	Impact Arena		
2025	29 June	Gemini Fourth Run the World Asia Tour	Zepp Namba, Osaka		
2025	26 July	Heart Dawn: Fourth Shanghai Fan Party	Shanghai, China		
2025	30–31 August	Gemini Fourth A.W.A.K.E Concert	Impact Arena		
2025	7 September	Sawasdee Seoul Thai Festival 2025	Cheonggye Plaza, Seoul		
2025	16 October	Gemini Fourth Fan Meeting in Los Angeles	The United Theater on Broadway		
2025	18 October	Gemini Fourth Fan Meeting in Denver	Ogden Theatre, Denver		
2025	2 November	Pond Phuwin Rendezvous Fancon	Union Hall, Union Mall	Guest appearance	
2025	22 November	Fourth of My Eye: Nanning Fan Meeting	Chizhao Live, Nanning, China		
2025	6 December	Big Mountain Music Festival 2025	The Ocean Khao Yai, Nakhon Ratchasima		
2025	20 December	GMMTV Starlympics 2025	Impact Arena		
2026	13–15 February	Riser Concert: The First Rise	Impact Arena		
2026	22–24 May	Love Out Loud Fan Fest 2026: Heart Race	Impact Arena		
2026	20 June	Gemini-Fourth: 4Ever Young Fan Meeting in Vietnam	C30 Hòa Bình Stage, Ho Chi Minh City		
2026	4 July	Ticket to Heaven Fan Party	MCC Hall, The Mall Lifestore Bangkapi		
2026	26 July	My Way to You: 2026 Gemini Fourth Fan Meeting in Taipei	NTU Sports Center		
2026	8 August	GMMTV Fan Fest 2026 in Macau	Venetian Arena		
2026	4–6 September	Gemini Art-Venture Concert	BITEC Live	Guest appearance	
2026	16–18 October	Oh My Fourth Concert	BITEC Live		
2026	28 November	GMMTV Starlympics 2026	Impact Arena		

== Awards and nominations ==
Award nominations for Nattawat Jirochtikul
Year	Award	Category	Nominee(s)	Result	Ref.
2023	Golden Kinnaree Awards	Popular Couple Artists	My School President (with Norawit Titicharoenrak)	Won	
2023	Thailand Master Youth 2022–2023	Youth's Favorite Actor	My School President (with Norawit Titicharoenrak)	Won	
2023	Kazz Awards 2023	Hottest Artist Award	with Norawit Titicharoenrak	Won	
2023	Kazz Awards 2023	Most Trending on Social Media	My School President	Won	
2023	Mint Awards 2023	Breakthrough Cast of the Year	My School President	Won	
2023	Mint Awards 2023	Entertainment Program of the Year	My School President	Won	
2023	Feed Y Capital Awards 2023	Y Couple of the Year	with Norawit Titicharoenrak	Won	
2023	Howe Awards 2023	The 50 Influential People 2023		Won	
2023	Mellow Pop	Music Popular Vote (October)	"อยู่เฉยๆก็น่ารัก (Please Be Mine)"	Won	
2023	Y Universe Awards 2023	The Best Leading Role	My School President	Won	
2023	GQ Men of the Year 2023	Breakthrough Actors	with Norawit Titicharoenrak	Won	
2024	33rd Seoul Music Awards	Thai Best Artist	with Norawit Titicharoenrak	Won	
2024	28th Asian Television Awards	Best Theme Song	"The Moon Represents My Heart"	Nominated	
2024	Sanook Top of the Year 2023	Rising Star of the Year		Won	
2024	TOTY Music Awards	Best Rookie	"อยู่เฉยๆก็น่ารัก (Please Be Mine)"	Nominated	
2024	Kazz Awards 2024	Num Wai Sai 2023 (1st place)		Won	
2024	20th Kom Chad Luek Awards	Best New Artist		Nominated	
2024	20th Kom Chad Luek Awards	Outstanding Rising Star	Moonlight Chicken	Won	
2024	20th Kom Chad Luek Awards	Popular Couple	with Norawit Titicharoenrak	Nominated	
2024	20th Kom Chad Luek Awards	Popular Male Actor		Nominated	
2024	Asian Academy Creative Awards 2024	Best Theme Song or Title Theme (Thailand)	"ลบยัง (Re-Move On)"	Won	
2024	Howe Awards 2024	Shining Male Award	My School President	Won	
2024	Howe Awards 2024	The Best Couple Award	with Norawit Titicharoenrak	Nominated	
2024	29th Asian Television Awards	Best Music Video	"เทคะแนน (Candidate)"	Won	
2024	Y Entertain Awards 2024	Best Series OST of the Year	"ลบยัง (Re-Move On)"	Won	
2024	Y Entertain Awards 2024	Y Couple of the Year	with Norawit Titicharoenrak	Nominated	
2024	Y Universe Awards 2024	Best Series Soundtrack	"ลบยัง (Re-Move On)"	Won	
2024	Asia Artist Awards 2024	Thai Star Award	with Norawit Titicharoenrak	Won	
2025	Line Stickers Awards 2024	Best Couple Stickers	Gemini Fourth 2	Won	
2025	TOTY Music Awards	Popular OST of the Year	"ลบยัง (Re-Move On)"	Nominated	
2025	Superstar Idol Awards 2025	Best Y Actor	My Love Mix-Up!	Won	
2025	21st Kom Chad Luek Awards	Popular Male Actor		Nominated	
2025	21st Kom Chad Luek Awards	Popular Y Couple	with Norawit Titicharoenrak	Nominated	
2025	Kazz Awards 2025	The Best Actor of the Year		Nominated	
2025	Kazz Awards 2025	Popular Male Artist Award		Nominated	
2025	Thailand Y Content Awards 2024	Best Series Soundtrack	"ลบยัง (Re-Move On)"	Nominated	
2025	Thailand Y Content Awards 2024	Popular Vote		Nominated	
2025	TikTok Awards Thailand 2025	Celebrity Creator of the Year		Nominated	
2025	30th Asian Television Awards	Best Music Video	"ง้อ (Alright)"	Nominated	
2025	Thailand Music Countdown x Spotify	T-Pop Now Hottest of the Month (November)	"Side to Side"	Won	
2026	Japan Expo Thailand Award 2026	Next Generation Award	with Norawit Titicharoenrak	Won	
2026	The Viral Hits Awards 2025	Best BL Couple of the Year	with Norawit Titicharoenrak	Nominated	
2026	The Viral Hits Awards 2025	Best Male Solo Artist of the Year		Won	
2026	Sanook Top of the Year 2025	Most Iconic Couple	with Norawit Titicharoenrak	Nominated	
2026	Sanook Top of the Year 2025	Sanook Top of the Year		Nominated	
2026	Mint Awards 2026	Best Cover of the Year	Mint, Vol. 35	Nominated	
2026	Feed x Khaosod Awards 2026	Boys' Love Actor of the Year	Ticket to Heaven	Won	
2026	31st Asian Television Awards	Best Music Video	"Every Single Day"	Nominated	
2026	31st Asian Television Awards	Best Theme Song	"Heavenly"	Nominated	
2026	Asian Academy Creative Awards 2026	Best Theme Song or Title Theme (Thailand)	"Heavenly"	Won	
