= Moonlight Chicken =

2023 Thai television series

- Official series poster
- Also known as: Midnight Series: Moonlight Chicken
- Thai: พระจันทร์มันไก่
- Genre: Romantic drama; Boys' love
- Written by: Noppharnach Chaiyahwimhon; Kittisak Kongka
- Directed by: Noppharnach Chaiyahwimhon
- Starring: Pirapat Watthanasetsiri; Sahaphap Wongratch; Kanaphan Puitrakul; Thanawat Rattanakitpaisan; Norawit Titicharoenrak; Nattawat Jirochtikul
- Music by: Wutticha Kuanium
- Opening theme: "The Moon Represents My Heart" (Cover) by Earth, Mix, First, Khaotung, Gemini, Fourth
- Ending theme: "พรุ่งนี้ (Tomorrow)" by Ford Arun
- Country of origin: Thailand
- Original language: Thai
- No. of episodes: 8

Production
- Executive producers: Sataporn Panichraksapong; Darapa Choeysanguan
- Production location: Thailand
- Cinematography: Rath Roongrueangtantisook
- Running time: 60–75 minutes
- Production company: GMMTV

Original release
- Network: GMM 25; Disney+ Hotstar
- Release: 8 February – 2 March 2023

Related
- Midnight Series

Moonlight Chicken (Thai: พระจันทร์มันไก่; RTGS: Phra Chan Man Kai) is a 2023 Thai boys' love television series, starring Pirapat Watthanasetsiri (Earth), Sahaphap Wongratch (Mix), Kanaphan Puitrakul (First), Thanawat Rattanakitpaisan (Khaotung), Norawit Titicharoenrak (Gemini) and Nattawat Jirochtikul (Fourth), directed by Noppharnach Chaiyahwimhon (Aof) and produced by GMMTV.

The series is also known as Midnight Series: Moonlight Chicken, since it was announced as one of three short series about nightlife, collectively known as the Midnight Series at the GMMTV Borderless event on 1 December 2021.

The series premiered on GMM 25 and Disney+ Hotstar on 8 February 2023, airing on Wednesdays and Thursdays at 18:00 ICT. The series concluded on 2 March 2023.

== Synopsis ==
Uncle Jim (Pirapat Watthanasetsiri) is the owner of Moonlight Chicken, a bustling late-night diner in Pattaya that specializes in khao man kai, offering unlimited servings to customers after midnight. He understands the struggle to make ends meet as the cost of living continues to skyrocket following the COVID-19 pandemic. Not only does he have numerous business expenses to bear, he is also responsible for taking care of his nephew, Li Ming (Nattawat Jirochtikul), who is about to graduate high school and is unsure about what he wants to do in the future.

One night, as Jim closes up his restaurant, he goes to wake up a drunken customer, Wen (Sahaphap Wongratch). Jim offers to drive Wen to the main street where he can get picked up by his friend. The two share a beer and go for an intimate stroll through the moonlit streets during the Moon Festival. When they arrive at the main street, Wen is fast asleep and his phone battery is dead. Unable to contact Wen's friend, Jim decides to bring Wen to his house. Beginning to sober up, Wen seductively expresses that he does not want to go home. Although Jim feels a connection with him, he hesitates, not wanting things to become complicated. Wen reassures Jim and the two share a passionate night together.

The next day, Li Ming offers to deliver an order to Officer Supoch's house, where his son, Heart (Norawit Titicharoenrak), is home alone and unaware of Li Ming's arrival. Heart gets startled when Li Ming taps him on the arm, causing him to drop a bottle of expensive liquor from which he was about to steal a drink. Li Ming later learns that Heart has been sheltered from the world by his parents after developing a hearing impairment around three years ago.

Having to settle and partially compensate for the damages, Li Ming asks to work for the family. He is tasked household chores and is asked to keep Heart company. Despite their rocky first encounter, Li Ming and Heart grow fond of each other as they spend time together, learn how to communicate using sign language, and begin to understand each other's personal struggles.

Meanwhile, Jim and Wen get closer after Jim accepts Wen's offer to work part-time at the diner during Li Ming's absence. Things get complicated when Wen learns that his company's redevelopment project includes a plan to demolish the buildings around Moonlight Chicken. What's more, Jim and Wen both carry emotional baggage from their past relationships.

== Cast and characters ==
=== Main ===
- Pirapat Watthanasetsiri (Earth) as Jaruek Nuengnauam (Jim)
- Sahaphap Wongratch (Mix) as Wongsakorn Thunapakarn (Wen)

=== Supporting ===
- Kanaphan Puitrakul (First) as Anantachai Lertwongsa (Alan)
- Thanawat Rattanakitpaisan (Khaotung) as Gaipa
- Norawit Titicharoenrak (Gemini) as Heart
- Nattawat Jirochtikul (Fourth) as Lertpong Nuengnauam (Li Ming)
- Pakin Kunaanuwit (Mark) as Saleng
- Benyapa Jeenprasom (View) as Praew
- Pornnapa Theptinnakorn (Sui) as Jintana (Heart's mother)
- Suraphan Chaopaknam (A) as Officer Suphoch (Heart's father)
- Narinthorn Na Bangchang (Aey) as Hongdarun Kansamut (Gaipa's mother)
- Pijika Jittaputta (Lookwa) as Jam (Li Ming's mother)
- Kittisak Patomburana (Jack) as Gong (Wen's friend)
- Putthipong Jeerungulrith (Aof) as Aof
- Phromphiriya Thongputtaruk (Papang) as Beam
- Inthiporn Tamsukhin (Maxine) as Khwan

=== Guest ===
- Chokchai Charoensuk as Chawin (Wen's stepfather) (Ep. 3)
- Thepthana Pankawong Na Ayutthaya (Mac) as Pastor (Ep. 4)
- Arun Asawasuebsakul (Ford) as Singer (Ep. 4)
- Kornprom Niyomsil (Au) as Bubble tea vendor (Ep. 5)
- Noppharnach Chaiyahwimhon (Aof) as Waiter (Ep. 5)
- Kitsadee Phuangprayong (Best) as Tong (Jam's boyfriend) (Ep. 8)
- Himawari Tajiri as Gam (Ep. 8)

== Soundtrack ==
No.	Title	Writer(s)	Artist	Length
1.	"The Moon Represents My Heart" (Cover)	Weng Ching-hsi	Earth; Mix; First; Khaotung; Gemini; Fourth	3:28
2.	"Tomorrow" (พรุ่งนี้)	SIN	Ford Arun	3:48

== Production ==
The series was announced at the GMMTV Borderless event on 1 December 2021. It was announced as one of three short series with a theme surrounding nightlife, collectively known as the Midnight Series, which also includes Midnight Motel (2022) and Dirty Laundry (2023). Director Aof Noppharnach shared that the idea of the Midnight Series project came from Dirty Laundry director Jojo Tichakorn Phukhaotong, who wanted to tell the story of the lives of people who may be considered as marginal and are often not explored in media, such as a motel staff member, a laundry girl or a chicken rice seller. They found that these people tend to spend their lives at night. Actor First Kanaphan adds that the theme of the series is reflected in its title, which represents the stories of those who gather at a chicken rice shop, who have struggles in life and endure the hardship of working until late at night.

The series marks the reunion of director Aof Noppharnach with Earth Pirapat, Mix Sahaphap, and Khaotung Thanawat, following the success of A Tale of Thousand Stars (2021). The series also reunites First Kanaphan and Khaotung Thanawat, who worked together in The Eclipse (2022). The series also brings in rising newcomers Gemini Norawit and Fourth Nattawat, who star in the concurrently airing series My School President (2022).

== Marketing ==
The series was promoted with the Opening Night Moonlight Chicken event, a premiere screening of the first episode with the actors in attendance, held in Ballroom Hall 1–2 of the Queen Sirikit National Convention Center on 8 February 2023.

The series was wrapped up with the Moonlight Chicken Final Ep. Fan Meeting event, held at the True Icon Hall, Iconsiam on 2 March 2023. The event included performances by the cast, a Q&A session, as well as exclusive behind-the-scenes footage and deleted scenes.

== Awards and nominations ==
Award nominations for Moonlight Chicken
Year	Award	Category	Nominee(s)	Result	Ref.
2023	ContentAsia Awards 2023	Best LGBTQ+ Programme Made in Asia	Moonlight Chicken	Gold	
2023	Feed Y Capital Awards 2023	Y Series of the Year	Moonlight Chicken	Won	
2023	Y Universe Awards 2023	Best Director	Noppharnach Chaiyahwimhon	Won	
2023	Y Universe Awards 2023	Best Series Screenplay	Moonlight Chicken	Won	
2023	Y Universe Awards 2023	Best Supporting Actor	Thanawat Rattanakitpaisan	Won	
2023	Y Universe Awards 2023	The Best Supportive	Norawit Titicharoenrak	Won	
2024	28th Asian Television Awards	Best Actor in a Supporting Role	Thanawat Rattanakitpaisan	Nominated	
2024	28th Asian Television Awards	Best Drama Series	Moonlight Chicken	Nominated	
2024	28th Asian Television Awards	Best Theme Song	"The Moon Represents My Heart"	Nominated	
2024	20th Kom Chad Luek Awards	Best Lakorn or Series Screenplay	Noppharnach Chaiyahwimhon and Kittisak Kongka	Nominated	
2024	20th Kom Chad Luek Awards	Best Supporting Actor	Pakin Kunaanuwit	Nominated	
2024	20th Kom Chad Luek Awards	Outstanding Rising Star	Nattawat Jirochtikul	Won	
