= Norawit Titicharoenrak =

Thai actor and singer (born 2004)

- นรวิชญ์ ฐิติเจริญรักษ์
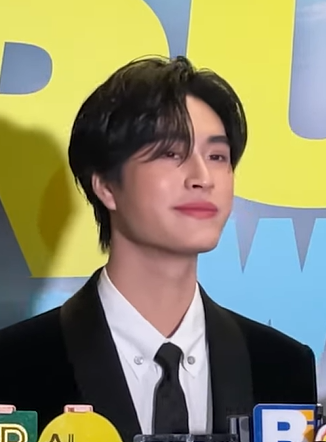
- Norawit in September 2024
- Born: 13 June 2004 (age 22); Bangkok, Thailand
- Education: Harrow International School Bangkok: Chulalongkorn University
- Occupations: Actor; singer; CEO
- Years active: 2019–present
- Agent: GMMTV
- Known for: Tinn in My School President; Heart in Moonlight Chicken; Barth in Ticket to Heaven
- Height: 1.83 m (6 ft 0 in)
- Musical career
- Genres: Pop; T-pop
- Instruments: Vocals; piano; guitar; drum; bass
- Label: Riser Music

Norawit Titicharoenrak (Thai: นรวิชญ์ ฐิติเจริญรักษ์; born 13 June 2004), nicknamed Gemini (Thai: เจมีไนน์), is a Thai actor under GMMTV and a singer under Riser Music. He first gained attention through the reality television program Thailand School Star 2019 and rose to prominence for his role as Tinn in the series My School President (2022) and as Heart in Moonlight Chicken (2023). He is also known for his role as Barth in Ticket to Heaven (2026).

== Early life and education ==
Norawit was born on 13 June 2004 in Bangkok, Thailand. He was nicknamed Gemini after his zodiac sign. He is an only child and was conceived through in vitro fertilisation, after his parents experienced infertility. His family is of Thai Chinese descent.

Gemini shared that he had always wanted to be a singer. He was actively involved in music in school, having been a music club leader, singing and playing in three bands, namely Survival, Cyclone and Toxic, in addition to participating in music events and contests. In 2018, he attended a workshop offered by Grammy Vocal Studio, under which he then performed as the lead singer of the group Septave at the Sanamluang Music Playtime Season 4 event.

In May 2022, he finished his secondary education at Harrow International School. He is currently pursuing an international program, Bachelor of Arts and Science in Integrated Innovation (BAScii) at Chulalongkorn University.

== Career ==
=== 2019–2021: Career beginnings ===
At the age of fifteen, Gemini joined GMMTV's reality TV show Thailand School Star 2019, where he finished as one of the finalists and signed an exclusive contract with GMMTV. He also met Nattawat Jirochtikul (Fourth), who would become his future acting partner.

=== 2022–2023: Breakthrough with My School President and Moonlight Chicken ===
Gemini earned his breakthrough when he played his first lead role as Tinn in My School President (2022), starring alongside Fourth. The show takes a musical approach by incorporating songs performed by the cast into the storytelling. Gemini participated on the soundtrack, releasing his first solo single "เพลงรัก (Hook)". Gemini later reprised his role as Tinn in May 2023 in two episodes of the anthology series Our Skyy 2.

While My School President was still ongoing, Moonlight Chicken aired in early 2023, where Gemini starred as Heart, a young teenager who was sheltered from the world by his parents after developing a hearing impairment. Heart builds a romantic connection with Li Ming (also played by Fourth), who learns to communicate with him through sign language and helps him to step out from isolation.

The explosive popularity of My School President and Moonlight Chicken propelled Gemini and Fourth to significant fame and the duo quickly became popular as "GeminiFourth". Their fandom was given the name "Khunnoo" (คุณหนู), a title used to address a 'young master', heard in episode 4 of My School President. The cast of My School President went on to perform live on stage and met fans across Asia. Gemini and Fourth also gained recognition for their roles, receiving awards such as Popular Couple Artists at the Golden Kinnaree Awards, Hottest Artist Award at the Kazz Awards, Breakthrough Actors from GQ Men of the Year 2023, and Thai Best Artist at the 33rd Seoul Music Awards.

In March 2023, following the success of My School President, Gemini and Fourth went on to further establish themselves as artists with the release of their single "เขินให้หน่อย (You're Blushing?)", a city pop track co-produced by Now of Mirrr and songwriter Third of Tilly Birds. In August, Gemini released his first solo single "เอาไรว่ามา (Anything You Want)".

In June 2023, Gemini and Fourth participated in the Love Out Loud Fan Fest 2023: Lovolution concert alongside other GMMTV artists. In August, they headlined their first concert together, Gemini Fourth My Turn Concert. Due to overwhelming interest in concert tickets, a second date was added.

=== 2024–2025: Riser Music, My Love Mix-Up!, Run the World Concert tour and The Dark Dice ===
Gemini was revealed as a new artist under Riser Music in February 2024. In March, he released his single "ใกล้เกิน (Too Close To Handle)" under the new label. He collaborated with singer-songwriter Tee of Only Monday to co-write "วัน(ที่)ดี (Good Day)", which was released in July, recorded by Inn Sarin for the soundtrack of Wandee Goodday (2024). Gemini went on to collaborate with rapper UrboyTJ, who produced his single "เหนื่อยหน่อยนะ (Someone Like Me)", released in August. He also worked with producer and songwriter Milo of Tilly Birds for his pop ballad single "ค้าง (Still)", released in December. In August 2025, Gemini and Fourth released their pop R&B duet "เรียกว่ารักได้ไหม (Is This Love?)".

On 27 March 2024, Gemini and Fourth released their design of My Ideal Fan, named "Look Khunnoo" (ลูกคุณหนู), which would become their fandom mascot and make appearances at fan events.

Gemini was originally set to appear alongside Fourth in the girls' love series 23.5 (2024), but in July 2023, it was announced that they had withdrawn from the series in order to prepare for their roles in a new series. Gemini and Fourth went on to star in My Love Mix-Up! (2024), which premiered on 7 June 2024. They also performed on the soundtrack for the series, where their opening theme song, "ลบยัง (Re-Move On)", won Best Theme Song at the Asian Academy Creative Awards, Y Entertain Awards, and Y Universe Awards.

In addition to participating in the Love Out Loud Fan Fest 2024: The Love Pirates concert in May 2024, Gemini and Fourth went on to headline their Run the World Concert at the Impact Arena on 31 August and 1 September 2024, showcasing their wide range of abilities, including singing and dancing, featuring guest performances by Timethai and Jeff Satur. GMMTV announced that the duo would embark on the Run the World Asia Tour, continuing in Ho Chi Minh City in October and concluding on 29 June 2025 in Osaka.

Following the conclusion of the Run the World Asia Tour, Gemini and Fourth returned to the Impact Arena for their AI-themed A.W.A.K.E Concert on 30 and 31 August 2025. Gemini performed his first self-written song "What If" on the second day, with piano accompaniment by singer and pianist Tor Saksit. The song features lyrics that he previously shared on Tor's show, Piano & I, from a song he had written when he was younger. Inspired to revisit the song, he worked with producer Tor and co-writer Tun Peerawicht Tunkam, who had co-produced "ลบยัง (Re-Move On)", releasing the single "What If" in November 2025.

Gemini starred in the leading role in the supernatural drama The Dark Dice (2025), alongside Prim Chanikarn, who starred in his music video for "ใกล้เกิน (Too Close To Handle)". The series premiered on 10 September 2025.

=== 2026–present: Ticket to Heaven, The Love of Siam: The Musical ===
Gemini and Fourth performed at the Riser Concert: The First Rise, held at the Impact Arena on 13–15 February 2026. In March 2026, Gemini released his single "Dangerous", produced by singer-songwriter Hye of Paper Planes. Gemini and Fourth returned to the Impact Arena to perform at the Love Out Loud Fan Fest 2026: Heart Race concert on 22–24 May 2026.

Gemini and Fourth starred in the television series Ticket to Heaven (2026). Gemini played Barth, a new student with a troubled background sent to learn at a Catholic seminary who develops feelings for the devout student Tanrak, played by Fourth. Gemini won Best Actor in a Leading Role at the Asian Academy Creative Awards 2026 for his role as Barth.

Gemini held his first solo concert called Gemini Art-Venture Concert at BITEC Live on 4–6 September 2026.

In November 2025, it was announced that Gemini and Fourth would play the lead roles of Tong and Mew in the upcoming musical adaptation of the 2007 film Love of Siam. The musical is scheduled to premiere at the Muangthai Rachadalai Theatre in December 2026.

=== Personal ventures ===
In February 2023, Gemini ventured into entrepreneurship with his own clothing line named "Divine".

In February 2025, he launched "Pig Me Up", his new culinary venture specializing in grilled pork jowl, also called kho mu yang (คอหมูย่าง).

== Discography ==
=== Singles ===
==== As lead artist ====
Year	Title	Ref.
2023	"เอาไรว่ามา (Anything You Want)"	
2024	"ใกล้เกิน (Too Close To Handle)"	
2024	"เหนื่อยหน่อยนะ (Someone Like Me)"	
2024	"ค้าง (Still)"	
2025	"What If"	
2026	"Dangerous"	
2026	"ไม่มีวัน (Fragile)"	

==== Collaborations ====
Year	Title	Notes
2023	"เขินให้หน่อย (You're Blushing?)" (with Fourth Nattawat)	
2023	"กอด กอด (Hugs)" (with Off, Gun, Tay, New, Pond, Phuwin, Fourth, Perth, Chimon)	
2024	"You're My Treasure" (with Earth, Mix, Pond, Phuwin, First, Khaotung, Joong, Dunk, Fourth, Perth, Chimon, Force, Book, Jimmy, Sea, Winny, Satang)	Love Out Loud Fan Fest 2024
2025	"จองตั๋วแล้วจองตัวเธอด้วยได้ปะ (Love Ticket)" (with Tay, Nanon, Fourth)	SF Super Friends
2025	"Nekko มาดูแมวบ้านเราไหม?" (with UrboyTJ, Fourth)	Nekko Cat Food
2025	"เรียกว่ารักได้ไหม (Is This Love?)" (with Fourth Nattawat)	
2026	"Love Feels So Fast" (with Earth, Mix, Pond, Phuwin, First, Khaotung, Joong, Dunk, Fourth, Perth, Santa, Force, Book, Jimmy, Sea, Boun, Prem, William, Est, Junior, Mark, Joss, Gawin)	Love Out Loud Fan Fest 2026

==== Soundtrack appearances ====
Year	Title	Album	Notes
2022	"ข้างกัน (City)" (Cover) (Original by Three Man Down) (with Fourth Nattawat)	My School President OST	
2023	"ง้อว (Smile Please)" (with Fourth, Ford, Satang, Winny, Mark, Captain, Prom)	My School President OST	
2023	"เพลงรัก (Hook)"	My School President OST	Ep. 9 (Acoustic Version)
2023	"รักษา (Healing)" (with Fourth, Ford, Satang)	My School President OST	
2023	"แค่ครั้งเดียว (Once Upon a Time)" (with Fourth, Ford, Satang)	My School President OST	
2023	"The Moon Represents My Heart" (Cover) (with Earth, Mix, First, Khaotung, Fourth)	Moonlight Chicken OST	
2023	"รักหน้าตาเหมือนเธอไหม (Love Love Love)"	Our Skyy 2 OST	
2023	"รักคู่ขนาน (Multi-Love)" (with Fourth, Winny, Satang, Mark, Ford)	Our Skyy 2 OST	
2024	"ลบยัง (Re-Move On)" (with Fourth Nattawat)	My Love Mix-Up! OST	
2024	"ไม่เป็นฉัน (What I'm Looking For)"	My Love Mix-Up! OST	
2024	"ดั่งวาดฝันเสมอมา (It's You)" (with Fourth Nattawat)	My Love Mix-Up! OST	
2024	"ไม่รู้ว่ามันเรียกว่ารักหรือเปล่า (You've Been on My Mind)"	My Love Mix-Up! OST	
2026	"ถ้าสวรรค์ไม่มีเธอฉันก็ไม่อยากไป (Heavenly)" (with Fourth Nattawat)	Ticket to Heaven OST	
2026	"แทนรัก (Tanrak)"	Ticket to Heaven OST	

==== Promotional singles ====
Year	Title	Notes
2024	"เซ็กซี่ ซัมเมอร์ (Sexy Summer)"	Nescafé Thailand Promotional Track

=== Other appearances ===
Year	Title	Album	Notes	Ref.
2025	"ファースト・ラヴ (First Love)"	Best of GMMTV	Japanese version of "รักแรก (First Love)" by Nont Tanont from My Precious OST	

== Filmography ==
=== Television series ===
Key
†	Denotes television productions that have not yet been released

Year	Title	Role	Network	Notes	Ref.
2021	Bad Buddy	Student	GMM 25	Guest role (Ep. 10)	
2022	My School President	"Tinn" Tinnaphob Jirawatthanakul	GMM 25	Main role	
2023	Moonlight Chicken	Heart	GMM 25	Supporting role	
2023	Our Skyy 2	"Tinn" Tinnaphob Jirawatthanakul	GMM 25	Ep. 9–10, My School President	
2024	My Love Mix-Up!	"Kongthap" Kaweewat Thawornthammarat	GMM 25	Main role	
2025	The Dark Dice	Samut Wongmethin	GMM 25	Main role	
2026	Me and Thee	Himself	GMM 25	Cameo (Ep. 10)	
2026	Ticket to Heaven	"Barth" Bodin Tungwongwat	GMM 25	Main role	
TBA	Shooting Stars †	Kacha	TBA	Main role	
TBA	The Halo †	Ashira	TBA	Main role	

=== Television show ===
Year	Title	Network	Notes
2018	Be My Guest	NBT World	25 February 2018
2019	Thailand School Star 2019	GMMTV	
2020	Talk with Toey	GMM 25	Ep. 36
2021	Arm Share	GMMTV	Ep. 83
2022	รุ่นนี้ต้องรอด Young Survivors	GMMTV	Ep. 1, 4
2022	EMS Earth-Mix Space	GMMTV	Ep. 19
2022	Safe House Season 4	GMMTV	
2022	Arm Share	GMMTV	Ep. 108, 113, 115
2022	School Rangers	GMM 25	Ep. 242–244
2022	Sound Check	One 31	Ep. 193 (28 December 2022)
2023	Project Alpha Special	GMM 25	
2023	LittleBigWorld with Pond Phuwin	GMMTV	Ep. 12
2023	OffGun Fun Night	GMMTV	Special 9
2023	School Rangers	GMM 25	Ep. 255–257, 261
2023	EMS Earth-Mix Space SS2	GMMTV	Ep. 4
2023	คู่มันส์ Fun Day	True4U	5 March 2023
2023	The Wall Song	Workpoint TV	Ep. 139 (4 May 2023)
2023	คุณพระช่วย Khun Pra Chuay	Workpoint TV	14 May 2023
2023	เปรี้ยวปาก Preawpak	Channel 3	Ep. 183 (17 June 2023)
2023	Talk with Toeys	GMM 25	Ep. 114
2023	Missionทำด้วยใจ – Mission Done with Heart	GMMTV	Ep. 1–4, 6, 10
2023	A Free Meal Chance – May Pepsi Treat You?	GMMTV	
2023	Arm Share	GMMTV	Ep. 130
2023	I Can See Your Voice Thailand	Workpoint TV	Season 6, Ep. 15
2023	โตมาเป็น Grow Up to Be	One Playground	Ep. 2
2023	กระหายเล่า Krahai Lao	GMMTV	Special 1
2023	TayNew Meal Date	GMMTV	Special Ep. 16
2024	Face Off	Workpoint TV	Ep. 4 (6 February 2024)
2024	Piano & I	TorBright Channel	Ep. 76
2024	The Wall Song	Workpoint TV	Ep. 186 (28 March 2024)
2024	Pepsi Friend Feast Guide with Gemini-Fourth	GMMTV	
2024	Arm Share	GMMTV	Ep. 152, 165
2024	Chairs to Share	The Standard Pop	Ep. 38
2024	คำนี้ดี Featuring!	The Standard knd	Ep. 78
2024	Talk with Toeys	GMM 25	Ep. 162
2024	Brand's Brain Camp	GMMTV	
2024	The Mix Masters ทีมใช่ท้าชน	Workpoint TV	Ep. 6–7
2024	EMS Earth-Mix Space Special	GMMTV	Ep. 2
2024	หกฉากครับจารย์ Hok Chak Khrap Chan	Workpoint TV	Ep. 254–255
2024	School Rangers	GMM 25	Ep. 30–31
2024	Thailand Music Countdown	Channel 3	Ep. 19 (15 September 2024), Ep. 28 (30 November 2024)
2024	รอบวัน Rop Wan	One 31	Ep. 306 (17 September 2024)
2024	High Season แคมป์ซ่าฮาทุกฤดู Season 2 Rainy	One 31, GMMTV	Ep. 2–4
2024	T-Pop Stage Show	Workpoint TV	10 October 2024
2025	The Mask Soulmate	Workpoint TV	Ep. 5, 9
2025	Pepsi Friend Feast Guide with Gemini-Fourth Season 2	GMMTV	
2025	LittleBigWorld with Pond Phuwin	GMMTV	Ep. 15
2025	แฉ Chae	GMM 25	3 July 2025
2025	Based on 2 Stories	GMMTV	Ep. 3
2025	Arm Share	GMMTV	Ep. 190
2025	Lemon8 เปิดมุมลับกับเจมโฟร์ท Uncover the Secrets with GemFourth	GMMTV	
2025	T-Pop Stage	Workpoint TV	11 December 2025
2025	Thailand Music Countdown	Channel 3	Ep. 32 (28 December 2025)
2026	กี้ซดโอปโซ้ย Ki Sot Op Soi	One 31	18 January 2026
2026	รอบวัน Rop Wan	One 31	Ep. 675 (16 March 2026), Ep. 721 (25 May 2026), Ep. 751 (7 July 2026)
2026	แฉ Chae	GMM 25	21 April 2026, 20 October 2026
2026	T-Pop Stage	Workpoint TV	23 April 2026
2026	เฮ็ดอย่างเซียนหรั่ง Het Yang Sian Rang	One Playground	Ep. 87 (17 May 2026)
2026	คำนี้ดี Featuring!	The Standard knd	Ep. 205
2026	The Celebrities	TrueID	Ep. 12 (2 October 2026)
2026	วันนี้ Today	One 31	20 October 2026
2026	เคหสถานบานปลาย Khehasathan Banplai	One Playground	Ep. 112 (18 November 2026)

=== Theatre ===
Year	Date	Title	Role	Venue	Notes	Ref.
2026	11–25 December	The Love of Siam: The Musical	Tong	Muangthai Rachadalai Theatre	Main role	

=== Web series ===
Year	Title	Role	Notes	Ref.
2025	The Racing Track เพราะเรา... สนามนี้ไม่มีแพ้	Grab Food Driver	Friends of Grab	
2025	Bites of Promise	Gem	Bonchon Chicken	

=== Music video appearances ===
Year	Title	Artist(s)	Ref.
2022	"อีกนิด (Come Closer)"	Ford Arun	
2023	"พูดได้ไหม (Let Me Tell You)"	Fourth Nattawat	
2023	"ก้อนหินกับดวงดาว (Rock & Star)"	Fourth Nattawat	
2024	"ว้าวุ่นเลย (Whenever I See You)"	Fourth Nattawat	
2024	"ใครคนนั้น (Among Many People)"	Fourth Nattawat	

== Live performances ==
Year	Date	Name	Venue	Notes	Ref.
2022	25 June	Polca The Journey: Tay & New 1st Fan Meeting in Thailand	Chaengwattana Hall, Central Chaengwattana	Guest appearance	
2023	8 February	Opening Night Moonlight Chicken	Ballroom Hall 1–2, Queen Sirikit National Convention Center		
2023	2 March	Moonlight Chicken Final Ep. Fan Meeting	True Icon Hall, Iconsiam		
2023	18–19 March	My School President Prom Night Live On Stage	Union Hall, Union Mall		
2023	24–25 June	Love Out Loud Fan Fest 2023: Lovolution	Royal Paragon Hall		
2023	29–30 July	GMMTV Musicon in Japan	29 July: Zepp DiverCity, Tokyo; 30 July: Toyosu PIT		
2023	26–27 August	Gemini Fourth My Turn Concert	Impact Arena		
2023	9 October	GMMTV Fan Fest 2023 Live in Japan	Pia Arena MM		
2023	10 December	Big Mountain Music Festival 2023	The Ocean Khao Yai, Nakhon Ratchasima		
2023	16 December	GMMTV Musicon in Jakarta	Grand Ballroom, Pullman Jakarta Central Park		
2023	23 December	GMMTV Starlympic 2023	Impact Arena		
2024	23 February	GMMTV Happy Weekend	Tachikawa Stage Garden, Tokyo		
2024	27 April	Polca Time Traveling Concert	Union Hall, Union Mall	Guest appearance	
2024	18–19 May	Love Out Loud Fan Fest 2024: The Love Pirates	Impact Arena		
2024	31 August – 1 September	Gemini Fourth Run the World Concert	Impact Arena		
2024	5 October	GMMTV Musicon in Cambodia	Naba Theatre, NagaWorld2, Phnom Penh		
2024	19 October	Gemini Fourth Run the World Asia Tour	Hoa Binh Theater, Ho Chi Minh City		
2024	9 November	Gemini Fourth Run the World Asia Tour	Taipei International Convention Center		
2024	8 December	Big Mountain Music Festival 2024	The Ocean Khao Yai, Nakhon Ratchasima		
2024	21 December	GMMTV Starlympics 2024	Impact Arena		
2025	13 January	GMMTV Fan Fest 2025 Live in Japan	Tokyo Garden Theater		
2025	25 January	Gemini Fourth Run the World Asia Tour	SM Sky Dome, SM North EDSA		
2025	8 March	Gemini Fourth Run the World Asia Tour	The Theatre at Mediacorp, Singapore		
2025	30 March	Gemini Fourth Run the World Asia Tour	Broadway Theatre, Broadway Macau		
2025	2 April	Gemini Fourth First US Tour	Miramar Cultural Center, Miramar, Florida		
2025	4 April	Gemini Fourth First US Tour	SVA Theatre, New York City		
2025	6 April	Gemini Solo Fan Meeting in Denver	Ogden Theatre, Denver		
2025	9 April	Gemini Fourth 1st Fan Meeting in Mexico	Teatro Metropólitan, Mexico City		
2025	17–18 May	Love Out Loud Fan Fest 2025: Lovemosphere	Impact Arena		
2025	29 June	Gemini Fourth Run the World Asia Tour	Zepp Namba, Osaka		
2025	19 July	Perth Santa Time Stopper Fancon	Union Hall, Union Mall	Guest appearance	
2025	27 July	Heart Dawn: Gemini Shanghai Fan Party	Shanghai, China		
2025	30–31 August	Gemini Fourth A.W.A.K.E Concert	Impact Arena		
2025	16 October	Gemini Fourth Fan Meeting in Los Angeles	The United Theater on Broadway		
2025	18 October	Gemini Fourth Fan Meeting in Denver	Ogden Theatre, Denver		
2025	31 October	Pond Phuwin Rendezvous Fancon	Union Hall, Union Mall	Guest appearance	
2025	20 December	GMMTV Starlympics 2025	Impact Arena		
2026	13–15 February	Riser Concert: The First Rise	Impact Arena		
2026	1 March	Polca Fam Meeting	Union Hall, Union Mall	Guest appearance	
2026	22–24 May	Love Out Loud Fan Fest 2026: Heart Race	Impact Arena		
2026	20 June	Gemini-Fourth: 4Ever Young Fan Meeting in Vietnam	C30 Hòa Bình Stage, Ho Chi Minh City		
2026	4 July	Ticket to Heaven Fan Party	MCC Hall, The Mall Lifestore Bangkapi		
2026	26 July	My Way to You: 2026 Gemini Fourth Fan Meeting in Taipei	NTU Sports Center		
2026	8 August	GMMTV Fan Fest 2026 in Macau	Venetian Arena		
2026	4–6 September	Gemini Art-Venture Concert	BITEC Live		
2026	16–18 October	Oh My Fourth Concert	BITEC Live	Guest appearance	
2026	28 November	GMMTV Starlympics 2026	Impact Arena		

== Awards and nominations ==
Award nominations for Norawit Titicharoenrak
Year	Award	Category	Nominee(s)	Result	Ref.
2023	Golden Kinnaree Awards	Popular Couple Artists	My School President (with Nattawat Jirochtikul)	Won	
2023	Thailand Master Youth 2022–2023	Youth's Favorite Actor	My School President (with Nattawat Jirochtikul)	Won	
2023	Kazz Awards 2023	Hottest Artist Award	with Nattawat Jirochtikul	Won	
2023	Kazz Awards 2023	Most Trending on Social Media	My School President	Won	
2023	Mint Awards 2023	Breakthrough Cast of the Year	My School President	Won	
2023	Mint Awards 2023	Entertainment Program of the Year	My School President	Won	
2023	Mint Awards 2023	Rookie of the Year		Won	
2023	Feed Y Capital Awards 2023	Y Couple of the Year	with Nattawat Jirochtikul	Won	
2023	Howe Awards 2023	The 50 Influential People 2023		Won	
2023	Y Universe Awards 2023	The Best Supportive	Moonlight Chicken	Won	
2023	GQ Men of the Year 2023	Breakthrough Actors	with Nattawat Jirochtikul	Won	
2024	33rd Seoul Music Awards	Thai Best Artist	with Nattawat Jirochtikul	Won	
2024	28th Asian Television Awards	Best Theme Song	"The Moon Represents My Heart"	Nominated	
2024	28th Asian Television Awards	Best Theme Song	"เพลงรัก (Hook)"	Nominated	
2024	Kazz Awards 2024	Num Wai Sai 2023 (2nd place)		Won	
2024	Kazz Awards 2024	Rising Male of the Year		Won	
2024	20th Kom Chad Luek Awards	Popular Couple	with Nattawat Jirochtikul	Nominated	
2024	20th Kom Chad Luek Awards	Most Popular Thai Pop Singer		Nominated	
2024	Asian Academy Creative Awards 2024	Best Theme Song or Title Theme (Thailand)	"ลบยัง (Re-Move On)"	Won	
2024	Howe Awards 2024	The Best Couple Award	with Nattawat Jirochtikul	Nominated	
2024	29th Asian Television Awards	Best Music Video	"ใกล้เกิน (Too Close To Handle)"	Nominated	
2024	Thailand Music Countdown x Spotify	T-Pop Now Hottest of the Month (October)	"เหนื่อยหน่อยนะ (Someone Like Me)"	Won	
2024	Y Entertain Awards 2024	Best Series OST of the Year	"ลบยัง (Re-Move On)"	Won	
2024	Y Entertain Awards 2024	Y Couple of the Year	with Nattawat Jirochtikul	Nominated	
2024	Y Universe Awards 2024	Best Series Soundtrack	"ลบยัง (Re-Move On)"	Won	
2024	Asia Artist Awards 2024	Thai Star Award	with Nattawat Jirochtikul	Won	
2025	Line Stickers Awards 2024	Best Couple Stickers	Gemini Fourth 2	Won	
2025	EFM94 Playlist of the Week	Champ of the Year 2024	"ใกล้เกิน (Too Close To Handle)"	Won	
2025	The Guitar Mag Awards 2025	New Wave of the Year		Nominated	
2025	The Guitar Mag Awards 2025	Star's Single Hits of the Year	"ใกล้เกิน (Too Close To Handle)"	Nominated	
2025	TOTY Music Awards	Popular OST of the Year	"ลบยัง (Re-Move On)"	Nominated	
2025	21st Kom Chad Luek Awards	Most Popular Thai Pop Singer		Nominated	
2025	21st Kom Chad Luek Awards	Popular Y Couple	with Nattawat Jirochtikul	Nominated	
2025	Kazz Awards 2025	Popular Male Teenage Award		Nominated	
2025	Kazz Awards 2025	Popular Male Artist Award		Nominated	
2025	Thailand Y Content Awards 2024	Best Series Soundtrack	"ลบยัง (Re-Move On)"	Nominated	
2025	Thailand Y Content Awards 2024	Popular Vote		Nominated	
2025	30th Asian Television Awards	Best Music Video	"ค้าง (Still)"	Nominated	
2026	Japan Expo Thailand Award 2026	Next Generation Award	with Nattawat Jirochtikul	Won	
2026	The Viral Hits Awards 2025	Best BL Couple of the Year	with Nattawat Jirochtikul	Nominated	
2026	Sanook Top of the Year 2025	Most Iconic Couple	with Nattawat Jirochtikul	Nominated	
2026	31st Asian Television Awards	Best Music Video	"Dangerous"	Nominated	
2026	31st Asian Television Awards	Best Theme Song	"Heavenly"	Nominated	
2026	Asian Academy Creative Awards 2026	Best Actor in a Leading Role (Thailand)	Ticket to Heaven	Won	
2026	Asian Academy Creative Awards 2026	Best Theme Song or Title Theme (Thailand)	"Heavenly"	Won	
