= Midnight Series =

2022–23 Thai television series

- Official series poster
- Genre: Romantic comedy
- Created by: GMMTV
- Directed by: Athip Vichuchaianan; Tichakorn Phukhaotong; Noppharnach Chaiyahwimhon
- Country of origin: Thailand
- Original language: Thai
- No. of episodes: 20: 6 (Midnight Motel); 6 (Dirty Laundry); 8 (Moonlight Chicken)

Production
- Producer: Sataporn Panichraksapong
- Running time: 51–75 minutes
- Production companies: GMMTV; Wakeup Rabbit Studio; Hard Feeling Film

Original release
- Network: GMM25; Disney+ Hotstar
- Release: 28 December 2022 – 2 March 2023

Midnight Series is a 2022–2023 Thai television series each presented through one of the three segments entitled Midnight Motel, Dirty Laundry and Moonlight Chicken.

Directed by three different directors, it was produced by GMMTV together with Wakeup Rabbit Studio for Midnight Motel and Hard Feeling Film for Dirty Laundry. It aired on Wednesdays and Thursdays on Disney+ Hotstar at 18:00 ICT, and was rebroadcast eventually on GMM25 at 20:30 ICT. The premiere segment Midnight Motel was broadcast on 28 December 2022 to 12 January 2023, followed by Dirty Laundry on 18 January 2023 to 2 February 2023, and the final segment Moonlight Chicken on 8 February 2023 to 2 March 2023.

== Synopsis ==
=== Midnight Motel ===
Mote (Jumpol Adulkittiporn) meets Kat (Ployshompoo Supasap), a prostitute, while working the night shift at his aunt's hotel. With the help of Mote's software engineer friend Doi (Thanawin Teeraphosukarn), they develop a software aimed at helping sex workers manage their debts. With a looming six-month deadline to settle his own debts and Kat's aspirations of relocating to Canada, they need to find investors. Their plans become more complicated when they get entangled in a mysterious murder case.

=== Dirty Laundry ===
Neon (Rachanun Mahawan), who works late at a laundromat, accidentally steals a bag with one million baht from her crush, Night (Korapat Kirdpan), a murder mystery novelist. After Night finds out that Neon stole the bag, he seeks the bag, but it has vanished. Together, they investigate the real thief using laundry service records that list potential suspects: Judo (Naravit Lertratkosum), a college student; P'Chompoo (Tachakorn Boonlupyanun), Night's landlord; Momay (Ploynira Hiruntaveesin), a karaoke hostess; and a rock couple named Nick (Patara Eksangkul) and Smile (Jennie Panhan).

=== Moonlight Chicken ===
Uncle Jim (Pirapat Watthanasetsiri) is the owner of Moonlight Chicken, a late-night diner in Pattaya that specializes in khao man kai. Amid rising living costs post COVID-19, he also cares for his indecisive nephew, Li Ming (Nattawat Jirochtikul), nearing high school graduation. One night, after helping a drunken customer, Wen (Sahaphap Wongratch), Jim and Wen form a connection, leading to a passionate night together. Things become complicated when Wen discovers his company plans to demolish Jim's restaurant, adding emotional complexity to their relationship.

== Cast and characters ==
=== Midnight Motel ===
==== Main ====
- Jumpol Adulkittiporn (Off) as Mote
- Ployshompoo Supasap (Jan) as Kat
- Thanawin Teeraphosukarn (Louis) as Doi
- Tanutchai Wijitvongtong (Mond) as Sun

==== Supporting ====
- Chatchawit Techarukpong (Victor) as Pat
- Sirilapas Kongtrakarn (Mew) as June (Pat's wife)
- Daweerit Chullasapya (Pae) as Jay
- Wachara Kanha (Guide) as Off
- Nipawan Taveepornsawan (Kai) as Mote's aunt
- Weerachat Duangwa (TuiBirdy) as Mote's uncle

==== Guest ====
- Siwat Homkham (Banane) as Kat's client (Ep. 1)
- Trai Nimtawat (Neo) as Tony (Ep. 5)

=== Dirty Laundry ===
==== Main ====
- Korapat Kirdpan (Nanon) as Night
- Rachanun Mahawan (Film) as Neon

==== Supporting ====
- Naravit Lertratkosum (Pond) as Judo
- Nipaporn Thititanakarn (Zani) as Mama Sang
- Ploynira Hiruntaveesin (Kapook) as Momay
- Jennie Panhan as Smile
- Patara Eksangkul (Foei) as Nicholas (Nick)
- Tachakorn Boonlupyanun (Godji) as Chompoo

=== Moonlight Chicken ===
==== Main ====
- Pirapat Watthanasetsiri (Earth) as Jaruek Nuengnauam (Jim)
- Sahaphap Wongratch (Mix) as Wongsakorn Thunapakarn (Wen)

==== Supporting ====
- Kanaphan Puitrakul (First) as Anantachai Lertwongsa (Alan)
- Thanawat Rattanakitpaisan (Khaotung) as Gaipa
- Norawit Titicharoenrak (Gemini) as Heart
- Nattawat Jirochtikul (Fourth) as Lertpong Nuengnauam (Li Ming)
- Pakin Kunaanuwit (Mark) as Saleng
- Benyapa Jeenprasom (View) as Praew
- Pornnapa Theptinnakorn (Sui) as Jintana (Heart's mother)
- Suraphan Chaopaknam (A) as Officer Suphoch (Heart's father)
- Narinthorn Na Bangchang (Aey) as Hongdarun Kansamut (Gaipa's mother)
- Pijika Jittaputta (Lookwa) as Jam (Li Ming's mother)
- Kittisak Patomburana (Jack) as Gong (Wen's friend)
- Putthipong Jeerungulrith (Aof) as Aof
- Phromphiriya Thongputtaruk (Papang) as Beam
- Inthiporn Tamsukhin (Maxine) as Khwan

==== Guest ====
- Chokchai Charoensuk as Chawin (Wen's stepfather) (Ep. 3)
- Thepthana Pankawong Na Ayutthaya (Mac) as Pastor (Ep. 4)
- Allan Asawasuebsakul (Ford) as Singer (Ep. 4)
- Kornprom Niyomsil (Au) as Bubble tea vendor (Ep. 5)
- Noppharnach Chaiyahwimhon (Aof) as Waiter (Ep. 5)
- Kitsadee Phuangprayong (Best) as Tong (Jam's boyfriend) (Ep. 8)
- Himawari Tajiri as Gam (Ep. 8)

== Production ==
Midnight Series was announced at the GMMTV Borderless event on 1 December 2021 as a collection of three different series, namely Midnight Motel (2022), Dirty Laundry (2023) and Moonlight Chicken (2023), which share a common theme surrounding nightlife. Director Aof Noppharnach shared that the idea of the Midnight Series project came from Dirty Laundry director Jojo Tichakorn Phukhaotong, who wanted to tell the story of the lives of people who may be considered as marginal and are often not explored in media, such as a motel staff member, a laundry girl or a chicken rice seller. They found that these people tend to spend their lives at night.
