= Ticket to Heaven =

Ticket to Heaven may refer to:

- Ticket to Heaven (film), a 1981 Canadian drama film directed by Ralph L. Thomas
- Ticket to Heaven (TV series), a 2026 Thai television series
- "Ticket to Heaven", a song by Dire Straits from On Every Street
