= My Love Mix-Up! (Thai TV series) =

2024 Thai television series

- Official series poster
- Thai: เขียนรักด้วยยางลบ
- Genre: Romantic comedy; Boys' love
- Based on: My Love Mix-Up! by Wataru Hinekure & Aruko
- Screenplay by: Pongsate Lucksameepong; Pratchaya Thavornthummarat
- Directed by: Kornprom Niyomsil
- Starring: Nattawat Jirochtikul; Norawit Titicharoenrak; Pathitta Pornchumroenrut; Puttipong Jitbut; Ochiris Suwanacheep
- Opening theme: "ลบยัง (Re-Move On)" by Gemini, Fourth
- Ending theme: "ว้าวุ่นเลย (Whenever I See You)" by Fourth (Ep 1–4, 6); "ลบยัง (Re-Move On)" by Gemini, Fourth (Ep 5, 8, 11–12); "ไม่มีอะไรที่เป็นไปไม่ได้ (Possible)" by Gemini, Fourth (Ep 7); "ไม่รู้ว่ามันเรียกว่ารักหรือเปล่า (You've Been on My Mind)" by Gemini (Ep 9–10)
- Country of origin: Thailand
- Original language: Thai
- No. of episodes: 12

Production
- Executive producers: Sataporn Panichraksapong; Darapa Choeysanguan
- Producer: Noppharnach Chaiyahwimhon
- Production location: Thailand
- Cinematography: Panpode Boonprasert
- Running time: 40–60 minutes
- Production company: GMMTV

Original release
- Network: GMM 25; Viu
- Release: 7 June – 23 August 2024

My Love Mix-Up! (Thai: เขียนรักด้วยยางลบ; RTGS: Khian Rak Duai Yanglop, lit. 'Write Love with [an] Eraser') is a 2024 Thai television series, starring Nattawat Jirochtikul (Fourth) and Norawit Titicharoenrak (Gemini), based on the Japanese manga series My Love Mix-Up! written by Wataru Hinekure and illustrated by Aruko. Directed by Kornprom Niyomsil (Au) and produced by GMMTV, the series was announced at the GMMTV Up and Above Part 1 event on 17 October 2023.

The series premiered on GMM 25 and Viu on 7 June 2024, airing every Friday at 20:30 ICT and 22:30 ICT, respectively.

== Synopsis ==
Atom (Nattawat Jirochtikul), a clumsy, easily frightened and energetic junior at Keerinsamutr School, has a secret crush on Mudmee (Pathitta Pornchumroenrut), the sincere and caring girl who sits next to him in class. One day, Mudmee lends Atom her eraser, on which he discovers the name of Kongthap (Norawit Titicharoenrak), the kind and handsome basketball player who sits just in front of him. Stunned by this revelation, Atom drops the eraser by accident, only for it to be picked up by Kongthap himself.

Some believe that if they write the name of their crush on an eraser, when the eraser is used up, their wish for love will come true. Not wanting to expose Mudmee's secret, Atom claims that the eraser belongs to him instead. However, this causes Kongthap to misunderstand, thinking that Atom has a crush on him.

== Cast and characters ==
=== Main ===
- Nattawat Jirochtikul (Fourth) as Achira Sophonpatima (Atom)
- Norawit Titicharoenrak (Gemini) as Kaweewat Thawornthammarat (Kongthap)
- Pathitta Pornchumroenrut (Pahn) as Monticha Phonglaksamee (Mudmee)
- Puttipong Jitbut (Chokun) as Half
  Atom's closest friend, who is blunt and playful, but is always there to help.

=== Supporting ===
- Ochiris Suwanacheep (Aungpao) as Khaopan
  Kongthap's childhood friend, basketball team captain and trusty advisor.
- Thanaboon Wanlopsirinun (Na) as Suea
  He is the Grade 11 (Matthayom 5) homeroom teacher and basketball team coach.
- Phromphiriya Thongputtaruk (Papang) as Annop
  He is the Grade 12 (Matthayom 6) homeroom teacher who also fills in for the student counsellor.
- Nussara Pawanna (Lhin) as Atom's mother
- Supaksorn Chaimongkol (Kratae) as Kongthap's mother
- Parinya Wattanawit (Noey) as Namkaeng
- Peerawicht Tunkam (Tun) as Toon
- Kornkanok Phumsiw as Tan

=== Guest ===
- Sabsima Payakharn (Pang) as Clair (Ep. 4)
- Nattharat Kornkaew (Champ) as Sergeant Yod (Ep. 5)
- Supasit Chinvinijkul (Pop) as Sin (Ep. 7, 9)
- Phudtripart Bhudthonamochai (Ryu) (Ep. 9)
- Johnathan Holman (Jack) as Mudmee's father (Ep. 10)
- Aki Yamaguchi as Mudmee's mother (Ep. 10)
- Thanawin Pholcharoenrat (Winny) as Win (Ep. 11)
- Kittiphop Sereevichayasawat (Satang) as Sound (Ep. 11)
- Allan Asawasuebsakul (Ford) as Por (Ep. 11)
- Teepakron Kwanboon (Prom) as Patchara (Pat) (Ep. 11)
- Pheerawit Koolkang (Captain) as Yo (Ep. 11)

== Soundtrack ==
No.	Title	Artist	Notes	Ref.
1	"ลบยัง (Re-Move On)"	Gemini, Fourth	Intro song Outro song (Ep 5, 8, 11–12)	
2	"ว้าวุ่นเลย (Whenever I See You)"	Fourth Nattawat	Outro song (Ep 1–4, 6)	
3	"ใครคนนั้น (Among Many People)"	Fourth Nattawat	Ep 2	
4	"ไม่เป็นฉัน (What I'm Looking For)"	Gemini Norawit	Ep 2	
5	"ดั่งวาดฝันเสมอมา (It's You)"	Gemini, Fourth	Ep 2	
6	"ไม่รู้ว่ามันเรียกว่ารักหรือเปล่า (You've Been on My Mind)"	Gemini Norawit	Ep 3 Outro song (Ep 9–10)	
7	"ไม่มีอะไรที่เป็นไปไม่ได้ (Possible)" (Cover) (Original by Lula feat. SIN)	Gemini, Fourth	Ep 7	
8	"น้ำลาย (Saliva)" (Cover) (Original by Silly Fools)	Satang, Ford	Ep 11	

== Production ==
Following the success of My School President (2022), GMMTV announced on 19 July 2023, that Gemini Norawit and Fourth Nattawat would no longer take part in the GL series 23.5 (2024), in order to prepare for their roles in a new series together.

On 17 October 2023, during the GMMTV "UP & ABOVE PART 1" event, this series was later revealed to be My Love Mix-Up! (2024), reuniting Gemini and Fourth with the director of My School President (2022), Au Kornprom. Director Au Kornprom stated that the series would be an adaptation of the nine volumes of the Japanese manga series My Love Mix-Up! written by Wataru Hinekura and illustrated by Aruko.

=== Filming ===
Principal photography began on 6 January 2024 and concluded on 29 March 2024. Si Racha was chosen as the primary setting of the series, where elements of Japanese culture can be found mixed with Thai culture, due to the presence of many Japanese workers in the district. Director Au Kornprom stated that he wanted the series to be reminiscent of Japan, as a nod to the original work, but he also wanted to add elements that made the series feel distinctively Thai, including food, clothes, and music. Filming locations include outdoor camping in Nakhon Nayok, J-Park Nihon Mura and Wat Khao Thabaek Skywalk in Si Racha, and Hua Lamphong railway station in Bangkok.

== Awards and nominations ==
Award nominations for My Love Mix-Up!
Year	Award	Category	Nominee(s)	Result	Ref.
2024	Asian Academy Creative Awards 2024	Best Theme Song or Title Theme (Thailand)	"ลบยัง (Re-Move On)"	Won	
2024	Y Entertain Awards 2024	Best Series OST of the Year	"ลบยัง (Re-Move On)"	Won	
2024	Y Universe Awards 2024	Best Series Soundtrack	"ลบยัง (Re-Move On)"	Won	
2025	TOTY Music Awards	POPular OST of the Year	"ลบยัง (Re-Move On)"	Nominated	
2025	Superstar Idol Awards 2025	Best Y Actor	Fourth Nattawat	Won	
2025	Thailand Y Content Awards 2024	Best Series Soundtrack	"ลบยัง (Re-Move On)"	Nominated	

=== Listicles ===
Year-end lists for My Love Mix-Up!
Critic/Publication	List	Rank	Ref.
Teen Vogue	13 Best BL Dramas of 2024	Included	
