= Ticket to Heaven (TV series) =

2026 Thai television series

- Official series poster
- Thai: เด็กชายไม่ไปสวรรค์
- Genre: Coming-of-age; Drama; Boys' love
- Screenplay by: Noppharnach Chaiyahwimhon; Kittisak Kongka
- Directed by: Noppharnach Chaiyahwimhon
- Starring: Norawit Titicharoenrak: Nattawat Jirochtikul
- Music by: Wutticha Kuaniam
- Opening theme: "Heavenly (ถ้าสวรรค์ไม่มีเธอฉันก็ไม่อยากไป)" (Choir a cappella version) by Siangthai-Dynamics
- Ending theme: "Heavenly (ถ้าสวรรค์ไม่มีเธอฉันก็ไม่อยากไป)" by Gemini, Fourth
- Country of origin: Thailand
- Original language: Thai
- No. of episodes: 6

Production
- Executive producers: Sataporn Panichraksapong; Darapa Choeysanguan
- Producers: Noppharnach Chaiyahwimhon; Rabob Pokanngaen
- Production location: Thailand
- Cinematography: Rath Roongrueangtantisook
- Running time: 55–82 minutes
- Production companies: GMMTV; Gemmistry Studio

Original release
- Network: GMM 25; Viu
- Release: 30 May – 4 July 2026

Ticket to Heaven (Thai: เด็กชายไม่ไปสวรรค์; RTGS: Dek Chai Mai Pai Sawan; lit. 'Boy(s) Not Going to Heaven') is a 2026 Thai coming-of-age boys' love television series, starring Norawit Titicharoenrak (Gemini) and Nattawat Jirochtikul (Fourth).

Directed by Noppharnach Chaiyahwimhon (Aof) and produced by GMMTV and Gemmistry Studio, the series was announced at the GMMTV Riding the Wave event on 26 November 2024.

The series premiered on GMM 25 and Viu on 30 May 2026, airing on Saturdays at 20:30 ICT and 21:30 ICT, respectively. The series is licensed for distribution in the US, UK, Germany and France on GagaOOLala.

== Synopsis ==
In 1996, Tanrak (Nattawat Jirochtikul) is a devout student at St. Magdalene College who is training to become a priest, hoping to one day reunite with his parents in Heaven. Tanrak is tasked to watch over Barth (Norawit Titicharoenrak), the new student with a troubled background. Tanrak begins to feel conflicted as he and Barth develop a bond that goes beyond friendship. When his faith clashes with his feelings, Tanrak must choose between love and the path to God.

== Cast ==
=== Main ===
- Norawit Titicharoenrak (Gemini) as Bodin Tungwongwat (Barth)
- Nattawat Jirochtikul (Fourth) as Tanrak Sawatdirakkul

=== Supporting ===
- Peerakan Teawsuwan (Ashi) as Kongdech Saenkham
- Rapheephong Thapsuwan (Bright) as Master Phak
- Poon Sutarom (Pun) as Kongkit
- Supakorn Kantanit (Guitar) as Prince
- Phakawat Tangchatkeaw (Tor) as Ryu
- Chaiyaporn Oliver Poupart (An) as Father Arnon
- Sinjai Plengpanich (Nok) as Busaya Tungwongwat (Barth's mother)
- Phollawat Manuprasert (Tom) as Barth's father
- Chayada Akiyama (Mook) as Cherry
- Thamonchita Namkool (Mantra) as Oh

=== Guest ===
- Suvijak Piyanopharoj (Keen) as Phai (Ep. 4, 6)
- Tawinan Anukoolprasert (Sea) as Jirasak Tosanti (Joe) (Ep. 4–5)
- Nattakorn Thavornchat (Tam) as Auntie Lek (Ep. 6)
- Noppharnach Chaiyahwimhon (Aof) as Bus ticket vendor (Ep. 6)

== Episodes ==
No.	Title	Original release date
1	"The Newcomer"	30 May 2026
Barth, a troubled boy, arrives at Magdalene House, a Catholic boys' seminary, as a middle of the year transfer student and immediately faces discrimination from his classmates. Tanrak, head of the scholarship students, is assigned to guide Barth and help him get acquainted to his new environment while dealing with Barth's anger and skepticism toward faith. As events unfold which lead the two boys being trapped together overnight, an unlikely bond starts to form.
2	"Unlikely Friendship"	6 June 2026
Tanrak continues his task to guide the rebellious newcomer Barth as his assigned buddy and helps him adjust to seminary life, join the Christmas preparations, and deal with punishments for his rule-breakings. As the two spend more time together — in music practice, in late-night talks, and in sneaking out for roti — their friendship develops further, with Barth showing unexpected talent and Tanrak opening up about his faith and family.
3	"Confession"	13 June 2026
Tanrak struggles to come to terms with his growing feelings for Barth while living in the strict religious environment of Magdalene House. As they spend more time together their bond grows, however, Tanrak becomes increasingly withdrawn and conflicted.

== Soundtrack ==
Ticket to Heaven Soundtrack
No.	Title	Writer(s)	Artist	Length
1.	"Heavenly (ถ้าสวรรค์ไม่มีเธอฉันก็ไม่อยากไป)"	Amp Achariya Dulyapaiboon	Gemini; Fourth	4:01
2.	"Heavenly (ถ้าสวรรค์ไม่มีเธอฉันก็ไม่อยากไป)" (Choir a cappella version)	Amp Achariya Dulyapaiboon	Siangthai-Dynamics	4:07
3.	"Tanrak (แทนรัก)"	Amp Achariya Dulyapaiboon	Gemini Norawit	4:01
4.	"Rain Fall (ดังในใจ)"	M1N	Fourth Nattawat	3:30

== Production ==
The series was announced during the GMMTV Riding the Wave event on 26 November 2024. In a press interview after the event, Director Aof Noppharnach shared that he was waiting for the right moment to pitch the idea for this series to Gemini and Fourth, following their collaboration in Moonlight Chicken (2023). Director Aof stated that the idea for the series came to him when he was visiting the St. Peter's Basilica. He was inspired to create this series with the intention to open up a conversation around the relationship between religion, faith and love. He also shared that he travelled to different churches around Rome to gather inspiration for the series.

Director Aof stated that the series was not really based on a true story, but was inspired by his own personal experiences growing up in a Catholic school. The series was set in 1996 to match his own timeline, at a time where LGBTQ people in Thailand were not accepted by society and topics about sexuality and gender identity were not often discussed publicly.

Author Kittisak Kongka shared that the Ticket to Heaven novel and the series would not be entirely identical. He and director Aof first came up with the idea of the plot together, which he then took to write the novel, a process which took several months. During that time, he and the director also continued to develop the script for the series, resulting in revisions that differ from the novel.

Fitting photos for the series were released on 26 February 2026, revealing additional cast members including Oliver Poupart (An), Peerakan Teawsuwan (Ashi), Poon Sutarom (Pun), Phakawat Tangchatkeaw (Tor) and Supakorn Kantanit (Guitar). A read-through with the cast was held on 28 February 2026. In March 2026, it was announced that the series had completed its workshop phase. Principal photography began on 19 March 2026 and concluded on 8 May 2026.

== Marketing ==
A fan sign event was held for the release of the Ticket to Heaven novel at the GMMTV Fanival 2026 event at CentralWorld Pulse on 1 April 2026.

The series was promoted with the Ticket to Heaven The Premiere screening event, held at the Iconsiam Hall on 30 May 2026. Fans were able to watch the first episode together with the cast. The event also featured special performances by the cast, as well as a chat with director Aof revealing behind-the-scenes stories.

The final episode was promoted with the Ticket to Heaven Fan Party, held at MCC Hall, The Mall Lifestore Bangkapi on 4 July 2026.

== Themes ==
The series explores themes of sexuality and religion, particularly Christianity. In an interview with Teen Vogue, Director Aof shared that they did not want there to be a villain in the show, in that they did not want religion or any character to be at fault. He added that the series was not made to pass judgement or to question if religion is wrong or love is right. He highlights the importance of love as the key message of the series, such that there does not have to be a choice between one's love for God and one's love for someone. Director Aof also stated the importance of including a transgender character that could still have faith, no matter their gender identity.

== Awards and nominations ==
Award nominations for Ticket to Heaven
Year	Award	Category	Nominee(s)	Result	Ref.
2026	Feed x Khaosod Awards 2026	Boys' Love Actor of the Year	Nattawat Jirochtikul	Won	
2026	Feed x Khaosod Awards 2026	Boys' Love–Girls' Love Director of the Year	Noppharnach Chaiyahwimhon	Won	
2026	Feed x Khaosod Awards 2026	Top-Tier BL Series of the Year	Ticket to Heaven	Nominated	
2026	31st Asian Television Awards	Best Southeast Asian Drama (Cinematography)	Rath Roongrueangtantisook	Nominated	
2026	31st Asian Television Awards	Best Southeast Asian Drama (Direction)	Noppharnach Chaiyahwimhon	Nominated	
2026	31st Asian Television Awards	Best Southeast Asian Drama (Screenplay)	Noppharnach Chaiyahwimhon and Kittisak Kongka	Nominated	
2026	31st Asian Television Awards	Best Southeast Asian Drama Series	Ticket to Heaven	Nominated	
2026	31st Asian Television Awards	Best Theme Song	"Heavenly"	Nominated	
2026	Asian Academy Creative Awards 2026	Best Actor in a Leading Role (Thailand)	Norawit Titicharoenrak	Won	
2026	Asian Academy Creative Awards 2026	Best Theme Song or Title Theme (Thailand)	"Heavenly"	Won	
