= Midnight Motel =

2022 Thai television series

- Official series poster
- Also known as: Midnight Series: Midnight Motel
- Thai: แอปลับ โรงแรมรัก
- Genre: Crime; Romance
- Directed by: Athip Vichuchaianan
- Starring: Jumpol Adulkittiporn; Ployshompoo Supasap; Thanawin Teeraphosukarn; Tanutchai Wijitvongtong
- Opening theme: "สองมาตรฐาน" by Only Monday
- Ending theme: "นับถอยหลัง (Countdown)" by Bomb at Track
- Country of origin: Thailand
- Original language: Thai
- No. of episodes: 6

Production
- Executive producers: Sataporn Panichraksapong; Darapa Choeysanguan
- Production location: Thailand
- Running time: 44–46 minutes
- Production company: GMMTV

Original release
- Network: GMM 25; Disney+ Hotstar
- Release: 28 December 2022 – 12 January 2023

Related
- Midnight Series

Midnight Motel (Thai: แอปลับ โรงแรมรัก; RTGS: Aep Lap Rongraem Rak, lit. 'Secret App, Love Motel') is a 2022 Thai television series starring Jumpol Adulkittiporn (Off), Ployshompoo Supasap (Jan), Thanawin Teeraphosukarn (Louis) and Tanutchai Wijitvongtong (Mond).

Directed by Athip Vichuchaianan (Momo) and produced by GMMTV together with Wakeup Rabbit Studio, it is also known as Midnight Series: Midnight Motel, since it was announced as one of three short series about nightlife, collectively known as the Midnight Series at the GMMTV 2022: Borderless event on 1 December 2021.

The series premiered on GMM 25 and Disney+ Hotstar on 28 December 2022, airing on Wednesdays and Thursdays at 18:00 ICT. The series concluded on 12 January 2023.

== Synopsis ==
Mote (Jumpol Adulkittiporn) works the night shift at his aunt's hotel to earn money to pay off his mounting debts. His life takes an unexpected turn when he witnesses a violent dispute between Kat (Ployshompoo Supasap), a sex worker, and her pimp, Sun (Tanutchai Wijitvongtong). Bound by their shared financial struggles, Mote and Kat decide to team up to find a way out of their hopeless circumstances.

The pair decides to create a mobile app specifically for sex workers to help them gain independence and safety. To build the platform, they recruit Mote's friend, Doi (Thanawin Teeraphosukarn), to handle the programming. Together, they work against a tight six-month deadline for Mote to settle his debts, while Kat focuses on her dream of quitting the industry and relocating to Canada.

However, their bid for a fresh start falters as they struggle to find investors for such a controversial project. Everything begins to unravel when Mote, Kat, and Doi become involved in a mysterious murder case, turning their new business into a life-or-death struggle against criminals and lies.

== Cast and characters ==
=== Main ===
- Jumpol Adulkittiporn (Off) as Mote
- Ployshompoo Supasap (Jan) as Kat
- Thanawin Teeraphosukarn (Louis) as Doi
- Tanutchai Wijitvongtong (Mond) as Sun

=== Supporting ===
- Chatchawit Techarukpong (Victor) as Pat
- Sirilapas Kongtrakarn (Mew) as June (Pat's wife)
- Daweerit Chullasapya (Pae) as Jay
- Wachara Kanha (Guide) as Off
- Nipawan Taveepornsawan (Kai) as Mote's aunt
- Weerachat Duangwa (TuiBirdy) as Mote's uncle

=== Guest ===
- Siwat Homkham (Banane) as Kat's client (Ep. 1)
- Trai Nimtawat (Neo) as Tony (Ep. 5)
