= My School President =

2022–23 Thai television series

- Official series poster
- Thai: แฟนผมเป็นประธานนักเรียน
- Genre: Romantic comedy; Boys' love
- Based on: แฟนผมเป็นประธาน My President by Pruesapha
- Written by: Pongsate Lucksameepong; Pratchaya Thavornthummarut
- Directed by: Kornprom Niyomsil
- Starring: Norawit Titicharoenrak; Nattawat Jirochtikul; Thanawin Pholcharoenrat; Kittiphop Sereevichayasawat; Pakin Kunaanuwit; Allan Asawasuebsakul; Teepakron Kwanboon; Pheerawit Koolkang; Napat Patcharachavalit
- Opening theme: "ไหล่เธอ (You've Got Ma Back)" by Fourth, Ford, Satang, Winny (Ep. 1–6); "ง้อว (Smile Please)" by Gemini, Fourth, Satang, Winny, Mark, Ford, Captain, Prom (Ep. 7–9); "ก้อนหินกับดวงดาว (Rock & Star)" by Fourth Nattawat (Ep. 10–12)
- Ending theme: "อีกนิด (Come Closer)" by Ford Arun (Ep. 1–5); "เพื่อนเล่นไม่เล่นเพื่อน (Just Being Friendly)" by Fourth, Ford, Satang (Ep. 6); "เพลงรัก (Hook)" by Gemini Norawit (Ep. 7–9); "แค่ครั้งเดียว (Once Upon a Time)" by Gemini, Fourth, Ford, Satang (Ep. 10–12)
- Country of origin: Thailand
- Original language: Thai
- No. of episodes: 12

Production
- Executive producers: Sataporn Panichraksapong; Darapa Choeysanguan
- Producer: Noppharnach Chaiyahwimhon
- Production location: Thailand
- Cinematography: Panpode Boonprasert
- Running time: 50–80 minutes
- Production company: GMMTV

Original release
- Network: GMM 25; Viu
- Release: 2 December 2022 – 24 February 2023

Related
- Our Skyy 2

My School President (Thai: แฟนผมเป็นประธานนักเรียน; RTGS: Faen Phom Pen Prathan Nakrian) is a 2022 Thai television series, starring Norawit Titicharoenrak (Gemini) and Nattawat Jirochtikul (Fourth). Directed by Kornprom Niyomsil (Au) and produced by GMMTV, the series was announced at the GMMTV Borderless event on 1 December 2021.

The series premiered on GMM 25 and Viu on 2 December 2022, airing on Fridays at 20:30 ICT and 22:30 ICT, respectively. The series concluded on 24 February 2023.

== Synopsis ==
Gun (Nattawat Jirochtikul) is the lead singer of the band Chinzhilla and the head of the Music Club at Niyomsil High School. His dream is to lead his band to victory at the Hot Wave Music Contest. However, due to an incident at the Hot Wave contest last year, the new school principal (Sarocha Watittapan) announces that any school club that does not boost the school's reputation will be shut down. In order to save his club, Gun turns for help from the school president, Tinn (Norawit Titicharoenrak).

For the past two years, Tinn has been secretly crushing on Gun. It is now their final year of high school and his last chance to confess his love. When he hears that the music club has a rule that forbids the members from dating until they win Hot Wave, he vows to do whatever it takes to help Gun achieve his dreams.

== Cast and characters ==
=== Main ===
- Norawit Titicharoenrak (Gemini) as Tinnaphob Jirawatthanakul (Tinn)
- Nattawat Jirochtikul (Fourth) as Guntaphon Wongwitthaya (Gun)

=== Supporting ===
- Thanawin Pholcharoenrat (Winny) as Win
- Kittiphop Sereevichayasawat (Satang) as Sound
- Allan Asawasuebsakul (Ford) as Por
- Teepakron Kwanboon (Prom) as Patchara (Pat)
- Pheerawit Koolkang (Captain) as Yo
- Pakin Kunaanuwit (Mark) as Tiwson Sophonpatima
  Tinn's best friend and trusty wingman.
- Napat Patcharachavalit (Aun) as Kajorn (Jorn)
- Sarocha Watittapan (Tao) as Potjanee
  Tinn's mother; Niyomsil High School principal.
- Gosin Rachakrom (Go) as Tinn's father
- Pijika Jittaputta (Lookwa) as Gim Ratchanee
  Gun's mother; she runs the milk café near the school.

=== Guest ===
- Sivakorn Lertchuchot (Guy) as Hot Wave MC
- Sasipa Tinboonchote (Jah) as Jah
- Thakorn Promsatitkul (Lotte) as Yak
- Aphichaya Kamnoetsirikun (Atom) as Nook
- Jirapat Uttamanan (Khunnote) as Decha
  Teacher and guidance counsellor.
- Kittipat Chalaragse (Golf) as Music Producer (Ep. 5)

== Soundtrack ==
Ep.	Title	Artist	Notes	Ref.
1	"อยากร้องดังดัง (Yak Rong Dang Dang)" (Cover) (Original by Palmy)	Fourth, Ford		
1	"น้ำลาย (Saliva)" (Cover) (Original by Silly Fools)	Fourth, Ford		
2	"ข้างกัน (City)" (Cover) (Original by Three Man Down)	Gemini, Fourth		
3	"อีกนิด (Come Closer)"	Ford Arun	Outro song (Ep. 1–5)	
4	"ไหล่เธอ (You've Got Ma Back)"	Fourth, Ford, Satang, Winny	Intro song (Ep. 1–6)	
5	"ฟัง (Listen)" (Cover) (Original by Sin feat. โอม Cocktail)	Fourth, Ford, Satang, Winny feat. Lookwa Pijika		
6	"เพื่อนเล่นไม่เล่นเพื่อน (Just Being Friendly)" (Cover) (Original by Tilly Birds feat. Milli)	Fourth, Ford, Satang	Outro song (Ep. 6)	
7	"ง้อว (Smile Please)"	Fourth, Gemini, Ford, Satang, Winny, Mark, Captain, Prom	Intro song (Ep. 7–9)	
8	"เพื่อนเล่นไม่เล่นเพื่อน (Just Being Friendly)" (Cover) (Original by Tilly Birds feat. Milli)	Fourth Nattawat		
9	"ถ้าไม่ใช่ (No One Else Like Me)"	Satang Kittiphop		
9	"เพลงรัก (Hook)"	Gemini Norawit	Outro song (Ep. 7–9)	
10	"พูดได้ไหม (Let Me Tell You)"	Fourth Nattawat		
11	"รักษา (Healing)"	Gemini, Fourth, Ford, Satang		
12	"ก้อนหินกับดวงดาว (Rock & Star)"	Fourth Nattawat	Intro song (Ep. 10–12)	
12	"แค่ครั้งเดียว (Once Upon a Time)"	Fourth, Gemini, Ford, Satang	Outro song (Ep. 10–12)	

== Reception ==
My School President received widespread popularity. It was frequently called "refreshing" and the overwhelmingly positive reception led to a number of fan events across Asian countries over the course of 2023. The final episode of the show was tweeted about over 1.2 million times on the day of its broadcast, trending at #1 worldwide, in Thailand, Malaysia, and other Asian countries. More than 4.6 million tweets were made about the show from its first broadcast day to the series finale. At the time the finale aired, the show had garnered a total of 150 million views across YouTube, Facebook, Instagram, TikTok and Twitter.

=== Viewership ===
In the table below, the blue numbers represent the lowest ratings and the red numbers represents the highest rating.

Episode	Date	Timeslot (UTC+07:00)	Average audience share	Ref.
Special	25 November 2022	Friday 20:30	0.1	
1	2 December 2022	Friday 20:30	0.2	
2	9 December 2022	Friday 20:30	0.2	
3	16 December 2022	Friday 20:30	0.2	
4	23 December 2022	Friday 20:30	0.2	
5	6 January 2023	Friday 20:30	0.3	
6	13 January 2023	Friday 20:30	0.1	
7	20 January 2023	Friday 20:30	0.2	
8	27 January 2023	Friday 20:30	0.241	
9	3 February 2023	Friday 20:30	0.223	
10	10 February 2023	Friday 20:30	0.107	
11	17 February 2023	Friday 20:30	0.136	
12	24 February 2023	Friday 20:30	0.251	
Average			0.2	

== Future ==
In 2023, My School President was included in the anthology series, Our Skyy 2. In the episodes featured, the series takes place in an alternate universe, where the characters have switched roles. Most of the cast members returned to reprise their roles.

== Concerts and fan meetings ==
Year	Date	Event	Venue	Ref..
2023	18–19 March	My School President Prom Night Live On Stage	Union Hall (Floor F6), Union Mall	
2023	7 May	GMMTV Fan Day 4 in Osaka	Dojima River Forum	
2023	27–28 May	My School President 1st Fan Meeting in Cambodia	AEON Hall (3rd floor), AEON Mall Sen Sok City (AEON2)	
2023	1 July	My School President 1st Fan Meeting in Singapore	Capitol Theatre	
2023	8 July	My School President 1st Fan Meeting in Taipei	Zepp New Taipei	
2023	5 August	My School President 1st Fan Meeting in Manila	University Theatre, UP Diliman	
2023	12 August	My School President 1st Fan Meeting in Hong Kong	AsiaWorld-Summit	
2023	12 November	My School President Fan Meeting in Vietnam	Hoa Binh Theater	
2023	23 November	My School President in Tokyo	Belle Salle Shinjuku Grand Hall	
2023	25 November	My School President 1st Fan Meeting in Seoul	Auditorium of Seoul Women's University	
2023	3 December	My School President 1st Fan Meeting in Macau	Lisboeta Macau	

== Awards and nominations ==
Award nominations for My School President
Year	Award	Category	Nominee(s)	Result	Ref.
2023	Golden Kinnaree Awards	Popular Couple Artists	Norawit Titicharoenrak and Nattawat Jirochtikul	Won	
2023	Thailand Master Youth 2022–2023	Youth's Favorite Actor	Norawit Titicharoenrak and Nattawat Jirochtikul	Won	
2023	Kazz Awards 2023	Most Trending on Social Media	My School President	Won	
2023	Mint Awards 2023	Breakthrough Cast of the Year	My School President	Won	
2023	Mint Awards 2023	Entertainment Program of the Year	My School President	Won	
2023	Y Universe Awards 2023	The Best Leading Role	Nattawat Jirochtikul	Won	
2024	Howe Awards 2024	Shining Male Award	Nattawat Jirochtikul	Won	
