= Dirty Laundry (Thai TV series) =

2023 Thai television series

- Official series poster
- Also known as: Midnight Series: Dirty Laundry
- Thai: ซักอบร้ายนายสะอาดรัก
- Genre: Mystery; Romantic comedy
- Directed by: Tichakorn Phukhaotong
- Starring: Korapat Kirdpan; Rachanun Mahawan
- Country of origin: Thailand
- Original language: Thai
- No. of episodes: 6

Production
- Executive producers: Sataporn Panichraksapong; Darapa Choeysanguan
- Production location: Thailand
- Running time: 46 minutes
- Production company: GMMTV

Original release
- Network: GMM 25; Disney+ Hotstar
- Release: 18 January – 2 February 2023

Related
- Midnight Series

Dirty Laundry (Thai: ซักอบร้ายนายสะอาด; RTGS: Sak Op Rai Nai Sa-at) is a 2023 Thai television series starring Korapat Kirdpan (Nanon) and Rachanun Mahawan (Film).

Directed by Tichakorn Phukhaotong (Jojo) and produced by GMMTV together with Hard Feeling Film, it is also known as Midnight Series: Dirty Laundry, since it was announced as one of three short series about nightlife, collectively known as the Midnight Series at the GMMTV 2022: BORDERLESS event on 1 December 2021.

The series premiered on GMM 25 and Disney+ Hotstar on 18 January 2023, airing on Wednesdays and Thursdays at 18:00 ICT. The series concluded on 2 February 2023.

== Synopsis ==
Neon (Rachanun Mahawan), a night-shift worker at a 24-hour laundromat, finds excitement in her routine through her interactions with Night (Korapat Kirdpan), a regular customer and her favorite mystery novelist. Following a series of encounters that bring them closer, Night suddenly stops visiting the shop. Prompted by concern, Neon locates Night at his apartment, where she unexpectedly discovers a suitcase of cash. Overwhelmed by temptation, she takes the money and decides to cut off contact with him.

However, she soon learns that the money was stolen by Night from a mafia syndicate. When Night attempts to retrieve the funds, they discover the suitcase is missing from Neon’s hands. The two form a reluctant alliance to find the real thief using laundromat records that list five suspects: Judo (Naravit Lertratkosum), a college student; P'Chompoo (Tachakorn Boonlupyanun), Night's landlord; Momay (Ploynira Hiruntaveesin), a karaoke hostess; and a rock couple, Nick (Patara Eksangkul) and Smile (Jennie Panhan). Neon and Night must analyze their habits and approach them one by one to get the money back.

The investigation eventually reveals P'Chompoo as the culprit. Driven by years of living from hand to mouth, she seized the opportunity to escape her financial struggles and secure a more comfortable life. Unfortunately, she has already exhausted the funds, having invested half the total amount. Faced with the mounting pressure of the syndicate's arrival, the duo and the suspects unite to design an intricate scheme, leading them to deceive the mafia and resolve the crisis through their collective efforts.

== Cast and characters ==
=== Main ===
- Korapat Kirdpan (Nanon) as Night
- Rachanun Mahawan (Film) as Neon

=== Supporting ===
- Naravit Lertratkosum (Pond) as Judo
- Nipaporn Thititanakarn (Zani) as Mama Sang
- Ploynira Hiruntaveesin (Kapook) as Momay
- Jennie Panhan as Smile
- Patara Eksangkul (Foei) as Nicholas (Nick)
- Tachakorn Boonlupyanun (Godji) as Chompoo
