= TayNew Meal Date =

2018 Thai web series

- Thai: กินกัน กับ เต - นิว
- Genre: Adventure; Travel; Food; Comedy
- Created by: GMMTV
- Directed by: Arnon Suttithamma
- Presented by: Tawan Vihokratana; Thitipoom Techaapaikhun
- Country of origin: Thailand
- Original language: Thai
- No. of episodes: 15

Production
- Production locations: Thailand; Japan; Hong Kong; South Korea
- Running time: 20 - 30 minutes
- Production company: GMMTV

Original release
- Network: YouTube; LINE TV
- Release: 30 November 2018 – 26 December 2019

TayNew Meal Date (Thai: กินกัน กับ เต - นิว; Kinkan Kap Tay - Niw; lit. Eat Together with Tay and New) is a Thai web series of GMMTV hosted by Tawan Vihokratana (Tay) and Thitipoom Techaapaikhun (New), both lead actors of Dark Blue Kiss (2019), currently available for streaming on YouTube and LINE TV.

Each episode features different places and restaurants where Tay and New get to taste and review several food choices. The series premiered on 30 November 2018 and aired mostly every last day of the month. It aired its last episode on 26 December 2019.

On 27 May 2020, five months after the web series ended and amidst the COVID-19 pandemic, GMMTV released a special episode with the hosts doing a virtual food tour where they feature and review some food choices from several restaurants of their friends in GMMTV.

== Episodes ==
No.	Title	Original release date	Ref.
1	"#TheEndOfDessertsLover"	30 November 2018	
Tay and New goes to The EmQuartier as they eat and review meat dishes and desserts.
2	"Late Night Meal Date"	25 December 2018	
Tay and New goes out to Ari (Aree) for a late night dessert date.
3	"is sweeter than dessert ..."	31 January 2019	
It's a deserts food trip for Tay and New as they eat and review 3 dessert cafés.
4	"ดอกไม้เด็ด เสร็จ "เต - นิว" (lit. transl. The flowers are complete "Tay-New")"	28 February 2019	
Tay and New visit interesting places to eat floral-infused desserts for Valentine's.
5	"Special ของดีที่ธนบุรี (lit. transl. Special good stuff at Thonburi)"	15 March 2019	
For this special episode, join Tay and New as they find affordable foods in Thonburi.
6	"สายหวานหลบไป สาย Healthy มาแล้ว (lit. transl. Sweet line has gone to healthy line)"	31 March 2019	
No sweet tooth foods this time as Tay and New go on a healthy food trip.
7	"Do You Dare Eat This?"	30 April 2019	
Tay and New are taking easy food but are they brave enough to try?
8	"กินญวนชวนฟิน (lit. transl. Eat Vietnamese)"	31 May 2019	
Tay and New learn about the health benefits of eating Vietnamese food.
9	"กินกันกินไกล หนีไปกินถึง Japan (lit. transl. Eat, eat far, escape to eat in Japan)"	30 June 2019	
Tay and New are on a food trip abroad to Japan where they converge for a sumptuous Japanese dinner with their fellow GMMTV artists.
10	"ท้องก็ต้องอิ่ม รูปก็ต้องได้ (lit. transl. The stomach must be full)"	31 July 2019	
As New's car broke down, Tay and New have to take a taxi to find their next food adventure.
11	"This meal have two tumultuous guests to eat in Hong Kong"	31 August 2019	
Perawat Sangpotirat (Krist) and Prachaya Ruangroj (Singto) join Tay and New in their food trip as they travel to Hong Kong for the KristSingto x TayNew Fan Meeting.
12	"กินกันแบบ Outdoor (lit. transl. Outdoor eating)"	30 September 2019	
This time, Tay and New will not be buying their food as they cook a delicious organic meal from the Patom Organic Farm.
13	"3 ร้านโลกเวทมนตร์ Halloween นี้ห้ามพลาด (lit. transl. 3 magic shops this Halloween not to miss)"	31 October 2019	
As Halloween approaches, Tay and New visit 3 magic-themed restaurants to find delicious food to eat.
14	"รวมเมนูดั้งเดิมของเกาหลีใต้ (lit. transl. Includes traditional South Korean dishes)"	30 November 2019	
Tay and New are on a food trip abroad to South Korea where they try various traditional Korean food and get a chance to visit the famous Gyeongbokgung Palace.
15	"กินกันต่อยังไม่หยุด ไปให้สุดที่เกาหลี (lit. transl. Continue to eat, don't stop. Go all the way to Korea.)"	26 December 2019	
Picking up from Episode 14, Tay and New continue their food trip in South Korea by trying other Korean-style food before going back home.
–	"เต - นิวกินเก่ง VS พ่อค้าขายเก่ง (lit. transl. Tay-New eat well VS Good salesman)"	27 May 2020	
Come back to eat again with Tay and New as they order and review food from restaurants of their friends at GMMTV.
–	"จุกๆ ก่อนนอน ขออิ่มท้องกับร้านระดับตำนาน (lit. transl. Before going to bed, let's fill our stomach with the legendary restaurant)"	13 November 2020	
After a working day, Tay and New goes to legendary restaurants with chili paste menus for a sumptuous dinner.
–	"ย้อนวันวาน เดินตลาดโต้รุ่งองค์พระปฐมเจดีย์ งานนี้กินแบบจุกๆ (lit. transl. Go back yesterday, walk the night market at Phra Pathom Chedi. Eat like this work.)"	11 December 2020	
Tay and New visits the Phra Pathom Chedi night market in Nakhon Pathom.

== Production ==
Prior to its release, Thitipoom Techaapaikhun (New) revealed that the original title of the web series was "นิวหิว" (RTGS: Niw Hiw, lit. transl. Hungry New) where he goes to different restaurants and talk about their food offerings. While shooting the first episode, he felt that it was too bland that he needed someone to talk about the food's calories or ingredients. He then invited Tawan Vihokratana (Tay) to be his guest on the first episode's shooting and as soon as the editing was done, the producers decided to make it the pair's program with the title "กินกัน กับ เต - นิว" (RTGS: Kinkan Kap Tay - Niw).
