= GQ Thailand =

- Editor-in-Chief: Pop Kampol Likitkanjanakul
- Categories: Fashion
- Frequency: monthly
- Total circulation: 250,000 (2014)
- First issue: September 2014
- Company: Serendipity Media Co., Ltd.
- Country: Thailand
- Language: Thai
- Website: www.gqthailand.com

GQ Thailand is the Thai edition of the international monthly men's magazine GQ. It was launched in September 2014. The first issue had a triple fold-out cover, with pictures of eight well-known Thai men.
