= Tilly Birds =

Thai alternative rock band

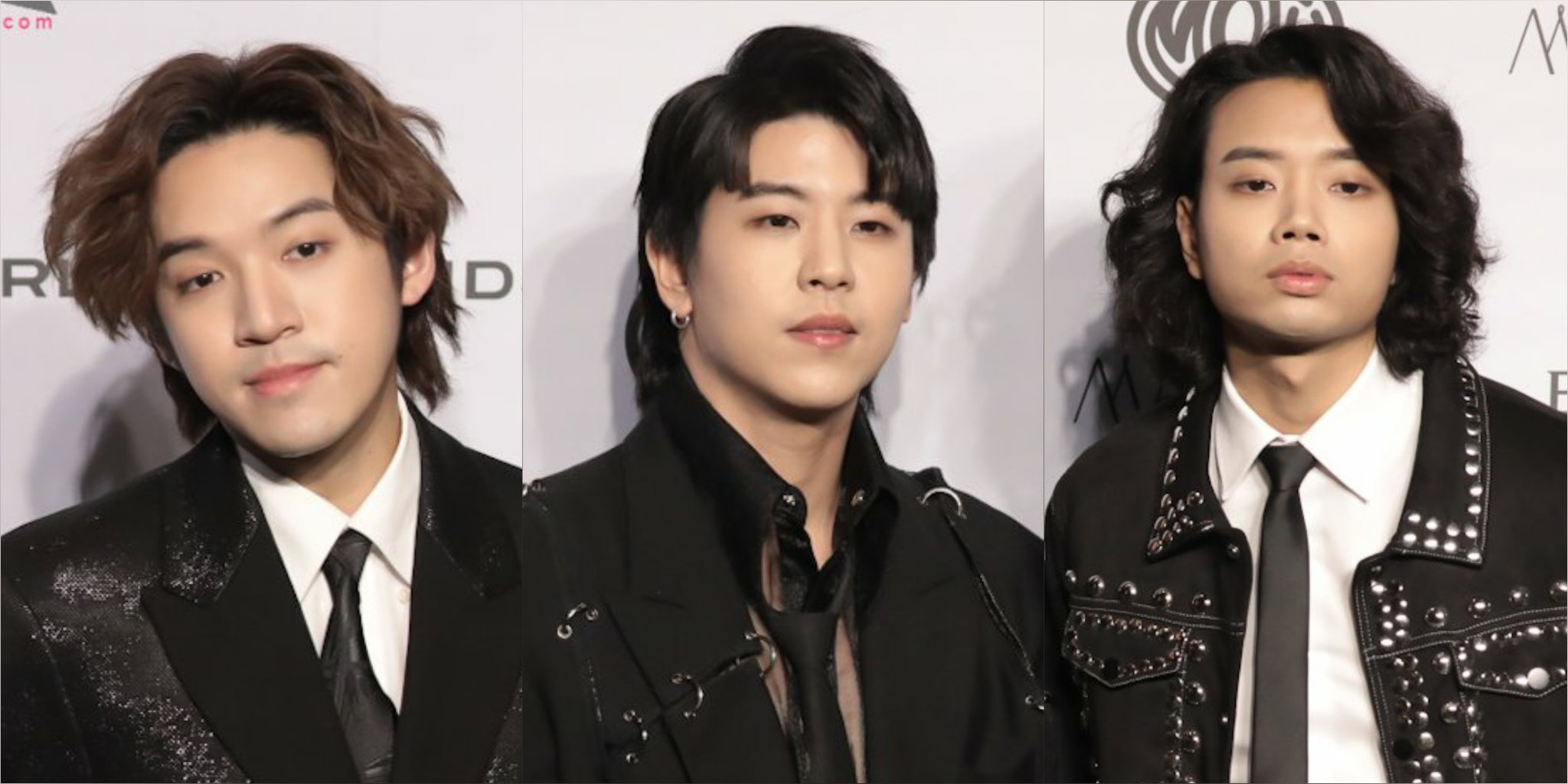
- Tilly Birds in 2022

Background information
- Origin: Bangkok, Thailand
- Genres: Alternative rock; Britrock; pop
- Years active: 2011–present
- Labels: Gene Lab, GMM Music
- Members: Anuroth Ketlekha (Third) (lead vocals); Nutdanai Chuchat (Billy) (guitars, keyboards); Thuwanon Tantiwattanaworakul (Milo) (drums, backing vocals)
- Past members: Bannawit Srisunt (Babe)
- Website: tillybirds.com

Tilly Birds (Thai: ทิลลี่เบิร์ด or ทิลลี่เบิร์ดส) (Note: Both spellings are correct according to the band's Twitter account) is an alternative rock band formed in Bangkok, Thailand, by lead vocalist Anuroth Ketlekha (Third) and guitarist Nutdanai Chuchat (Billy). They have been a trio with drummer Thuwanon Tantiwattanaworakul (Milo). The band's early releases were independent. In 2019, their major-label debut album Poo Diew (ผู้เดียว) was released through Gene Lab Records, GMM Grammy. They are known for Same Page? (คิดแต่ไม่ถึง Khit Tae Mai Thueng) and Just Being Friendly (เพื่อนเล่น ไม่เล่นเพื่อน Phuean Len Mai Len Phuean).

== History ==
=== Early years ===
The band was formed by Third and Billy when they were in high school. Their name is a spoonerism, a play on words, in which the initial letters in their names are swapped, turning "Billy Third" into "Tilly Bird". The band picked up members with Milo, Bookies and later Babe. They were invited to join the band when Third met them in the TU Folksong Club of Thammasat University. The band had been writing songs in English until 2017 which marked the year that they started writing songs in Thai which led to their first EP being released in May, 2017.

=== Entry into Gene Lab ===
The band joined the TV show Band Lab, a singing contest to find artists for the newly founded Gene Lab label at the time. They were picked as finalists in the show and they released their first single under the label with the name Ordinary (จากกันด้วยดี Chak Kan Duai De). Babe would leave the band during the run of the show. They released their second single under Gene Lab, Broken (อภัย Aphai).

=== 2019–2020: Success and Phu Diao The Album ===
They would start making their album after the release of Ordinary with them releasing their song Status (แค่พี่น้อง Khae Phi Nong) in April 2019, followed by The One (ผู้เดียว Phu Diao) in August 2019, followed by ineednoone (อยู่ได้ ได้อยู่ Yu Dai Dai Yu) in October 2019, followed by Bangkok Winter (ฤดูหนาว Ruedu Nao). Then they released their hit single Same Page? in March 2020 which peaked at number 1 of Spotify, Cat Radio and Apple Music charts making them well-known all over Thailand overnight. The song was so famous, their label greenlit their project with Three Man Down to create a mashup of their songs, Fon Tok Mai (ฝนตกไหม) and Same Page? with the intentionally unwieldy name ความคิดถึงที่ฉันได้เคยส่งไปในคืนที่ฝนโปรยลงมา (Khwam Khit Thueng Thi Chan Dai Khoei Song Pai Nai Khuen Thi Fon Proi Long Ma). They would continue to release songs for their albums; When The Film's Over (ยังคงสวยงาม Yang Khong Suai-ngam) in July 2020, Who I Am (ฉันมันเป็นใคร Chan Man Pen Khrai) in August 2020, My Black Mirror (ปลายนิ้ว Plai Niu), Cut To The Chase (เลิก! Loek!), What's Left... (ผู้เดียว Part 2 Phu Diao Part 2), Worth The Wait (แค่เธอเข้ามา Khae Thoe Khao Ma), Just So You Know (ให้กอดของฉันบอกทุกอย่าง Hai Kot Khong Chan Bok Thuk Yang), Unspoken (ไม่รู้สึก Mai Rusuek) in September 2020.

On 3 September 2020, they released their first album titled "Phu Diao".

On 29 September 2020, they released a cover of Wasan Chotikul's song Hai Toe (ให้เธอ).

=== 2021–present: It's Gonna Be OK ===
In January 2021, the band confirmed their second album release on Facebook live.

In April 2021, they released their single Just Being Friendly (เพื่อนเล่น ไม่เล่นเพื่อน Puean Len Mai Len Puean) which peaked at number 1 in Apple Music, Spotify, Joox and local radio charts. This song is the start to their next album. In August 2021, they would release Can't Keep Up (ลู่วิ่ง Lu Wing) which peaked at number 2 on Spotify charts behind their song Just Being Friendly. This song would reach one million views on YouTube within three days.

On 25 November 2021, they released the second album called "It's Gonna Be OK"

On 25 October 2022, they released the single Can't Have It All (ตัวเลือกตัวรอ Tua Lueak Tua Ror), and the deluxe album of "It's Gonna Be OK" which was released at 25 November 2022 to celebrate the 1 year anniversary of this album along with an audio version of "Is Everything OK?", a Virtual Concert on this album.

== Political activism ==
In the 2020-2021 Thai protests, the band supported the pro-democracy movement with Third participating in the protest on 18 July 2021. The band came out to support the Musicians and Crew Association of Thailand (MCAT) proposals to help the pub and music business. In the 10 August 2021 protest, Third attended and posted a picture of him in the protest holding a sign saying "วิ่งวิ่งอยู่อย่างนี้ วิ่งวิ่งอยู่กับที่ ไม่ไปไหน..ประเทศไทย" (Run, run like this, Run, run in place, Don't go anywhere... Thailand) a modified lyric from the chorus of Can't Keep Up, with the band's Twitter page quote tweeting; "เอเนอร์จี้ไปม็อบและขายของไปด้วย" (Energy of going to the protest and also promoting [your song]).

== Discography ==
=== Album ===
Name	Detail	Track listing	Album cover
ผู้เดียว (Phu Diao)	Release date: 3 September 2020; Format: CD, vinyl, cassette tape, streaming; Label: Gene Lab	Track listing: 1. ปลายนิ้ว (My Black Mirror); 2. ฤดูหนาว (Bangkok Winter) (featuring PAAM); 3. แค่เธอเข้ามา (Worth The Wait); 4. เลิก! (Cut To The Chase!); 5. ให้กอดของฉันบอกทุกอย่าง (Just So You Know); 6. ผู้เดียว (The One); 7. อยู่ได้ ได้อยู่ (ineednoone); 8. แค่พี่น้อง (Status); 9. คิดแต่ไม่ถึง (Same Page?); 10. ยังคงสวยงาม (When The Film's Over); 11. ผู้เดียว Part 2 (What's Left...); 12. ฉันมันเป็นใคร (Who I Am); 13. ไม่รู้สึก (Unspoken)	
It's Gonna Be OK	Release date: 25 November 2021; Format: CD, vinyl, streaming; Label: Gene Lab	Track listing: 1. เพื่อนเล่น ไม่เล่นเพื่อน (Just Being Friendly) (featuring MILLI); 2. ลู่วิ่ง (Can't Keep Up); 3. เบื่อคนขี้เบื่อ (I'm Not Boring, You're Just Bored); 4. เดอะแบก (Baggage); 5. ติดตรงที่ฉัน (It's Not You, It's Me); 6. ขอให้เธอโชคดี (Send You Off); 7. เธอไม่ได้อยู่คนเดียว (On My Shoulder); 8. ถ้าเราเจอกันอีก (Until Then)	
It's Gonna Be OK (Deluxe)	Release date: 25 November 2022; Format: CD, vinyl, streaming; Label: Gene Lab	Track listing: 1. เพื่อนเล่น ไม่เล่นเพื่อน (Just Being Friendly) (featuring MILLI); 2. ลู่วิ่ง (Can't Keep Up); 3. เบื่อคนขี้เบื่อ (I'm Not Boring, You're Just Bored); 4. เดอะแบก (Baggage); 5. ติดตรงที่ฉัน (It's Not You, It's Me); 6. ขอให้เธอโชคดี (Send You Off); 7. เธอไม่ได้อยู่คนเดียว (On My Shoulder); 8. ถ้าเราเจอกันอีก (Until Then); 9. ตัวเลือก ตัวรอ (Can't Have It All); 10. ดื่มให้หาย (Drink, Don't Think)	
I'll Remember To Forget You	Release date: 29 January 2026; Format: CD, vinyl, streaming; Label: GMM Global & Warner Music Asia	Track listing: 1. Dearest Tears; 2. Our Happy Place; 3. Call It A Day; 4. If You Say So (featuring James Alyn); 5. Shouting Eyes; 6. Never A Waste Of Time; 7. White Pills; 8. Dirty Knees; 9. Retro-39; 10. Before The Sun Can Shine; 11. Let Me Down In The Morning; 12. I'll Remember To Forget You; 13. Heaven (x Ben&Ben)	
VIVIDPALACE	Release date: 27 January 2027; Format: streaming; Label: BRIDGE Management	Track listing: 1. VIVIDPALACE; 2. จำเลย (The Wall); 3. พูดมาก่อน (Butterfiles); 4. ถ้าฉันยอม (The Opera Of Love Overdose); 5. เต้นรำในสุญญากาศ (Last Dance In The Void); 6. 0.001; 7. พริบตา (In Love, In Ruins); 8. มือลบ (Dreamer's Hands); 9. แค่...หายไป (Gone); 10. เหวี่ยง (Across The Worlds); 11. ฝันกลางคืน (Ocean Of Tears); 12. ฝันกลางวัน (You Are The Dream); 13. เพียงลำพัง (Hedgehog's Dilemma)	

=== Extended plays ===
Name	Detail	Track listing	EP cover
Tilly Birds	Released: 26 May 2017; Format: CD, streaming; Label: Independent	Track listing: 1. เขาเป็นใคร (Khao Pen Khrai); 2. ฉันไม่ใช่ (คนที่ใช่) (Chan Mai Chai (Khon Thi Chai)); 3. เรื่องดี ๆ (Rueang Di Di); 4. เพื่อ (Phuea); 5. คนที่มีความหมาย (Khon Thi Mi Khwammai)	
Tilly Birds (Acoustic Version)	Released: 6 April 2018; Format: streaming; Label: Independent	Track listing: 1. เขาเป็นใคร - Acoustic Version; 2. ฉันไม่ใช่ (คนที่ใช่) - Acoustic Version; 3. เรื่องดี ๆ - Acoustic Version; 4. เพื่อ - Acoustic Version; 5. คนที่มีความหมาย - Acoustic Version	

=== Singles ===
Year	Title	Album
2014	"Heart in a Cage"	-
2015	"Like a Dead Man"	-
2016	"Unwanted"	-
2016	"The Rest"	-
2016	"Crying Window"	-
2017	"เพื่อ"	Tilly Birds - EP
2017	"เขาเป็นใคร"	Tilly Birds - EP
2017	"เรื่องดีๆ"	Tilly Birds - EP
2018	"จากกันด้วยดี" (Ordinary)	-
2019	"อภัย" (Broken)	-
2019	"แค่พี่น้อง" (Status)	ผู้เดียว (Phu Diao)
2019	"ผู้เดียว" (The One)	ผู้เดียว (Phu Diao)
2019	"อยู่ได้ ได้อยู่" (ineednoone)	ผู้เดียว (Phu Diao)
2019	"ฤดูหนาว" (Bangkok Winter) (featuring PAAM)	ผู้เดียว (Phu Diao)
2020	"คิด(แต่ไม่)ถึง" (Same Page?)	ผู้เดียว (Phu Diao)
2020	"ยังคงสวยงาม" (When The Film's Over)	ผู้เดียว (Phu Diao)
2020	"ฉันมันเป็นใคร" (Who I Am)	ผู้เดียว (Phu Diao)
2021	"เพื่อนเล่น ไม่เล่นเพื่อน" (Just Being Friendly) (featuring MILLI)	It's Gonna Be OK
2021	"ลู่วิ่ง" (Can't Keep Up)	It's Gonna Be OK
2021	"เดอะแบก" (Baggage)	It's Gonna Be OK
2021	"เบื่อคนขี้เบื่อ" (I'm Not Boring, You're Just Bored)	It's Gonna Be OK
2022	"ถ้าเราเจอกันอีก" (Until Then)	It's Gonna Be OK
2022	"ตัวเลือก ตัวรอ" (Can't Have It All)	It's Gonna Be OK (Deluxe)
2024	"White Pills"	I'll Remember To Forget You
2024	"Retro-39"	I'll Remember To Forget You
2025	"Never A Waste Of Time"	I'll Remember To Forget You
2025	"Heaven" (x Ben&Ben)	I'll Remember To Forget You
2025	"Call It A Day"	I'll Remember To Forget You
2026	"Shouting Eyes"	I'll Remember To Forget You
2026	"จำเลย (The Wall)"	VIVIDPALACE
2026	"แค่...หายไป (Gone)"	VIVIDPALACE

=== Other projects ===
- กระแซะเข้ามาซิ [Originally by Pumpuang Duangjan] - 2018.02.11
- ใครพี่น้องเธอ [Tilly Birds x Pamiga] - 2019.05.24
- ความคิดถึงที่ฉันได้เคยส่งไปในคือที่ฝนโปรยลงมา [Three Man Down x Tilly Birds] - 2020.05.01
- จำเก่ง (Slipped Your Mind) [F.HERO x Tilly Birds] - 2020.06.18
- ให้เธอ [Originally by Wasan Chotikul] (Advertisement for The Pizza Company) - 2020.09.29
- อย่าอยู่เลย (Project Songland) - 2020.12.23
- ยิ้มเธอคือทุกอย่าง (Always Here) [Tilly Birds featuring LULA x Elio by ANANDA] - 2021.11.30
- ทุกวันพรุ่งนี้ (Along The Way) [Tilly Birds x Palmy] - 2022.05.27
- ปลายสายรุ้ง (ซนซน 40 ปี GMM GRAMMY) [Originally by Paradox] - 2023.08.10
- ล้มแชมป์ (Only You Can) [Tilly Birds x POLYCAT] - 2025.01.14
- ไม่ต้องคิดเผื่อใจ (You In Mind) (Advertisement for Thaivivat Insurance) 2025.10.10

Concert/Fan Meeting

- BIRDS' MEMORIES - 2017.08.27
- UNSPOKEN MOMENTS - 2019.12.22
- คนเดียวที่สำคัญ: Meeting เปิดอัลบั้ม ผู้เดียว - 2020.09.06
- We're Gonna Be OK - 2022.04.02
- It's Gonna Be Tilly Birds - 2023.07.01
- Tilly Birds : A Night Called Heaven - 2025.10.16
- Don't Forget to Remember | Album Concert - 2026.04.05
- I'll Remember to Forget You: Through Layered Walls - 2026.04.20, 2026.05.17

== Awards and nominations ==
Year	Award	Category	Result	Source
2025	KAZZ Awards	Best Band of the Year	Won	
