= Pirapat Watthanasetsiri =

Thai actor (born 1994)

- พิรพัฒน์ วัฒนเศรษสิริ
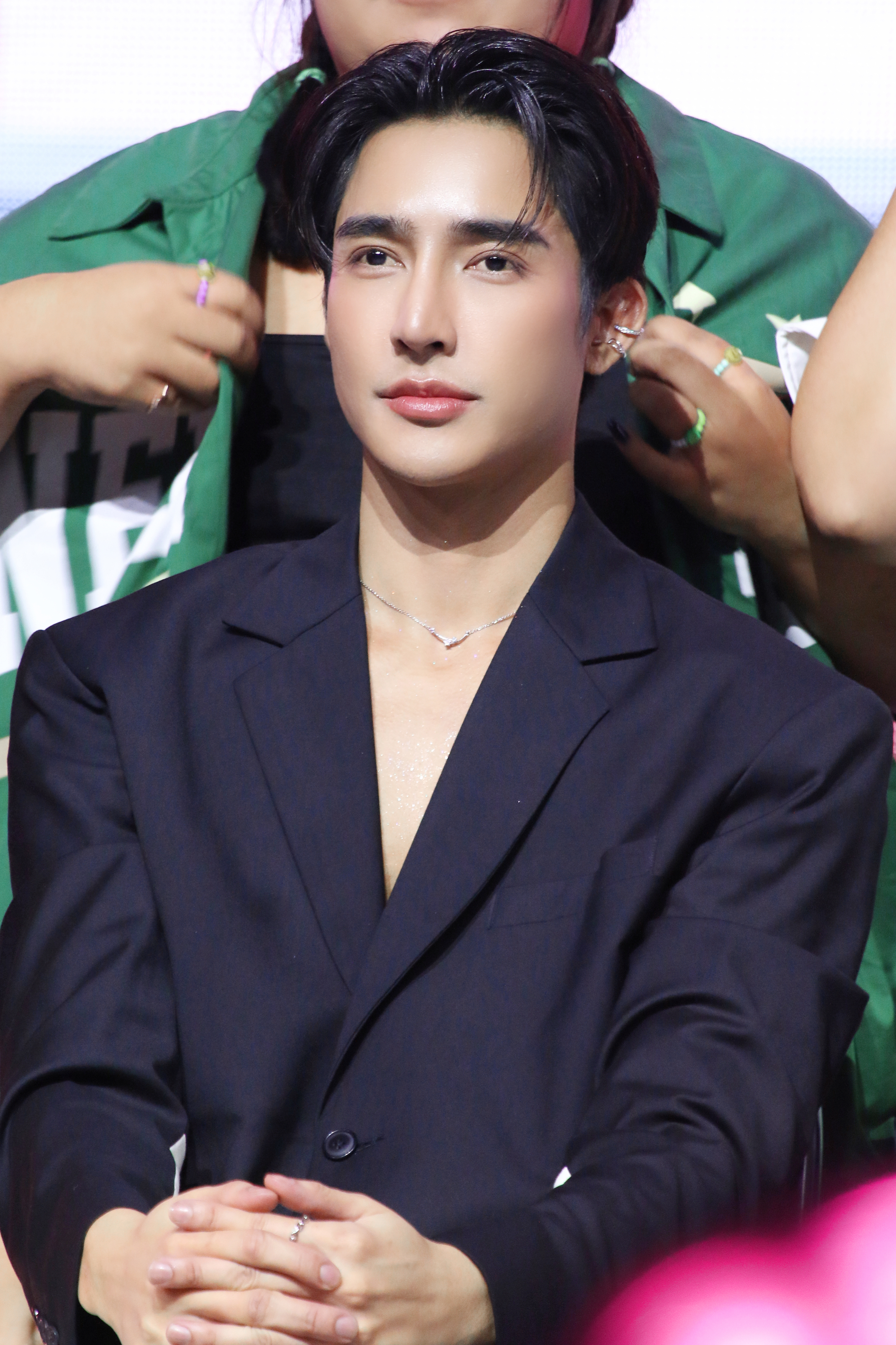
- Pirapat in September 2023
- Born: Pirapat Watthanasetsiri; 23 February 1994 (age 32); Bangkok, Thailand
- Other name: Earth Pirapat
- Education: Srinakharinwirot University (Faculty of Fine Arts)
- Occupation: Actor
- Years active: 2017–present
- Agent: GMMTV
- Known for: Waii in Water Boyy; So in Kiss Me Again; Chief Phupha in A Tale of Thousand Stars; Jim in Moonlight Chicken; Heng in Ossan's Love Thailand
- Height: 1.84 m (6 ft 0 in)

Pirapat Watthanasetsiri (Thai: พิรพัฒน์ วัฒนเศรษสิริ; born 23 February 1994), nicknamed Earth (Thai: เอิร์ท), is a Thai actor known for starring in the television series Water Boyy (2017) and Kiss Me Again (2018). He gained further recognition for his lead role as Chief Phupha in the television series A Tale of Thousand Stars (2021) starring alongside Sahaphap Wongratch (Mix).

== Personal life and education ==
Pirapat was born in Bangkok, Thailand. He graduated in 2018 with a bachelor's degree in performing arts from the Faculty of Fine Arts at Srinakharinwirot University. In addition to being an actor and singer, Pirapat also paints as a hobby.

In 2018, Pirapat's mother died. Before her death, he was in a car accident while on his way to see her in the hospital. He was uninjured but speaks about this period in his life as a particularly difficult one.

Pirapat is the owner of a chain of Thai massage parlors named "Nikko Thai Massage" and located in Bangkok. The first branch opened in January 2023, the second in June 2023 and the third in 2024.

In August 2023, Pirapat took to X (formerly Twitter) to complain about letters containing malicious content being sent to his business. He threatened legal action unless the malicious mail stopped. Later that month, Pirapat's management company, GMMTV, issued a statement that it had met with inspectors and taken legal action against an individual whose actions defamed Pirapat and damaged his image. According to the statement, the individual agreed to cease this behavior. The company further stated that it would take such action against similar behavior in the future.

== Acting career ==
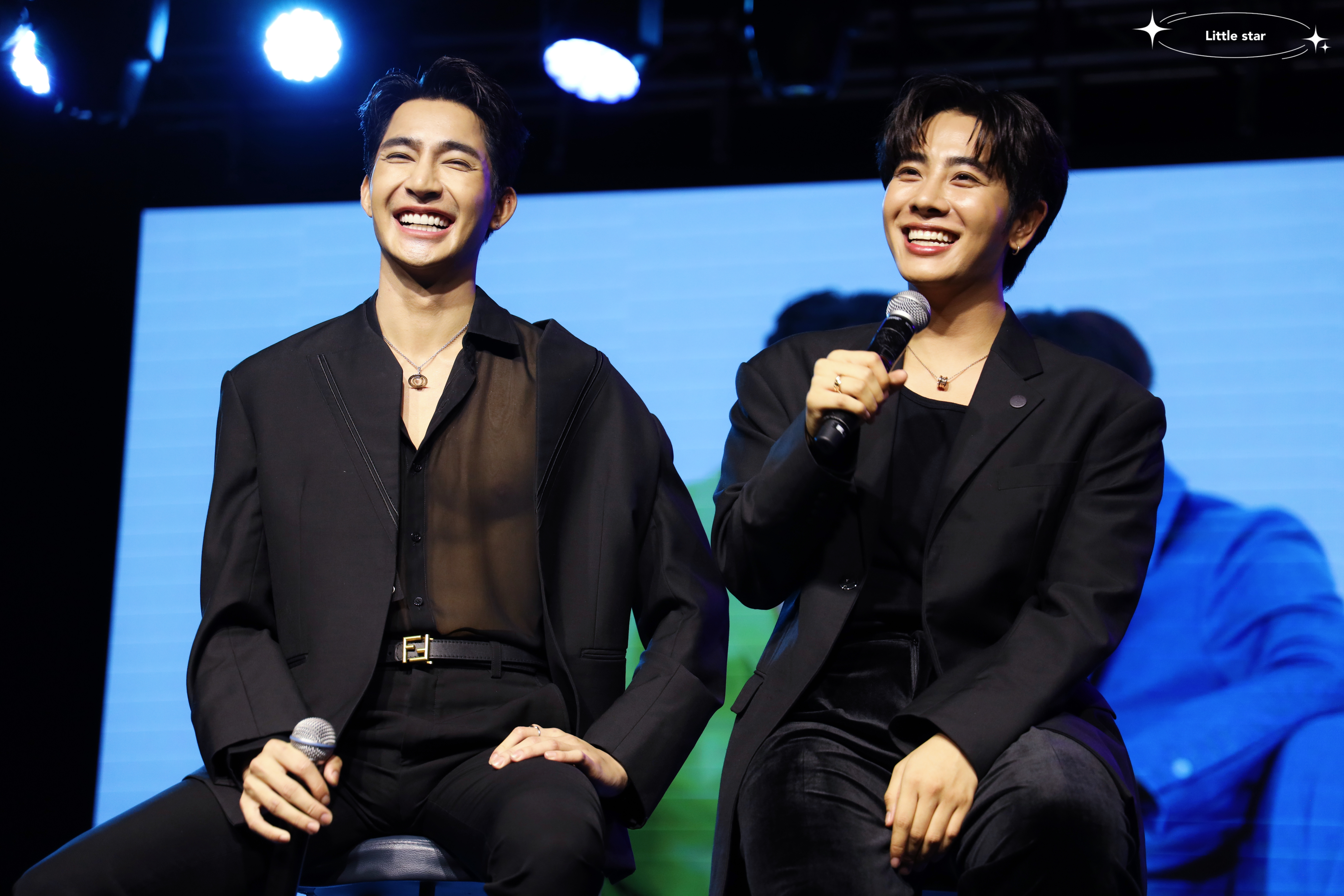
Pirapat and Sahaphap at their Taipei fanmeeting in May 2023

Pirapat is an artist with GMMTV. He has starred in multiple TV shows and is best known for the BL (Boys' Love) series A Tale of Thousand Stars where he played the lead role of Chief Phupha opposite fellow GMMTV actor Sahaphap Wongratch (Mix). The two actors' chemistry was praised by audiences and led to their work together in multiple future shows where they starred as leads. Among fans, the two are known as "EarthMix". In 2022, they debuted their own variety show on YouTube titled E.M.S Earth - Mix Space.

== Filmography ==
=== Television series ===
Key
†	Denotes television productions that have not yet been released

Year	Title	Role	Network	Notes	Ref.
2017	Water Boyy	Waii	GMM 25	Main role	
2017	Miraigar T1 Season 2	Sakat	One 31	Main role	
2018	Kiss Me Again	So	GMM 25	Main role	
2018	Love by Chance	Type	GMM 25	Supporting role	
2019	Theory of Love	Aun	GMM 25	Supporting role	
2020	Victory Lap	Tae	Channel 8	Main role	
2021	A Tale of Thousand Stars	"Phupha" Viriyanon	GMM 25	Main role	
2021	55:15 Never Too Late	Himself	Disney+ Hotstar	Guest role	
2022	Cupid's Last Wish	"Korn" Thapakorn Chaiphitak	Disney+ Hotstar	Main role	
2022	Mama Gogo	Kampan	GMM 25	Supporting role	
2023	Moonlight Chicken	"Jim" Jaruek Nueangna-uam	GMM 25	Main role	
2023	Our Skyy 2	"Phupha" Viriyanon	GMM 25	Main role	
2023	Find Yourself	Yang	GMM 25	Main role	
2024	Ossan's Love Returns	"Jim" Jaruek Nueangna-uam	TV Asahi	Guest role (Ep. 4)	
2024	Ploy's Yearbook	"Thap" Thapchana	GMM 25	Main role	
2025	Ossan's Love Thailand	"Heng" Haran Thanahirankij	GMM 25	Main role	
2026	Only Friends: Dream On	"Jack" Jakkarin Jookamsri	One 31	Main role	
TBA	Cupid's Ghost †	Jett Sukhati	TBA	Main role	
TBA	A Season to Remember †	Phloengnaphat	TBA	Main role	

=== Television special ===
Year	Title	Notes	Ref.
2016	Little Big Dream	Guest role	

=== Television show ===
Year	Title	Network	Notes
2016	Talk with Toey Tonight	GMM 25	Ep. 54
2017	Talk with Toey Tonight	GMM 25	Ep. 61
2017	มนุษย์ป้าล่าเด็ก	Line TV	Ep. 10
2017	รถโรงเรียน High School Reunion	GMM 25	Ep. 113–115
2017	ชวนเล่น Challenge	Line TV	Ep. 27–28, 34
2017	#TEAMGIRL	GMM 25	Ep. 26, 45
2018	School Rangers	GMM 25	Ep. 16–17, 44–46
2019	School Rangers	GMM 25	Ep. 72–73, 99–101
2019	Arm Share	GMMTV	Ep. 6, 12, 21
2019	คุณพระช่วย Khun Pra Chuay	Workpoint TV	8 September 2019
2019	OffGun Fun Night Season 2	GMMTV	Ep. 4
2020	School Rangers	GMM 25	Ep. 120–123, 131–132
2020	Arm Share	GMMTV	Ep. 39, 54
2020	เกมน้องกองพี่ Game Nong Gong Phi	GMMTV	Ep. 3
2020	เจนจัด ก๊อตจิก UP LEVEL	GMMTV	27 November 2020
2021	คุณพระช่วย Khun Pra Chuay	Workpoint TV	31 January 2021
2021	OffGun Fun Night	GMMTV	Special 3
2021	Talk with Toey	GMM 25	Ep. 56
2021	Arm Share	GMMTV	Ep. 59, 64, 76, 78, 83
2021	School Rangers	GMM 25	Ep. 157–158, 184–185
2021	กระหายเล่า Krahai Lao	GMMTV	Ep. 4, 7
2021	คู่มันส์ Funday 2021	True4U	Ep. 2
2021	Safe House	GMMTV	
2021	Hollywood Game Night Thailand Season 5	Channel 3	Ep. 34
2021–2022	EMS Earth-Mix Space	GMMTV	
2022	Safe House 3: Best Bro Secret	GMMTV	
2022	Arm Share	GMMTV	Ep. 101, 113
2022	Talk with Toeys	GMM 25	Ep. 74
2022–2023	School Rangers	GMM 25	Host
2022–2023	EMS Earth-Mix Space in Japan	GMMTV	
2023	Project Alpha Special	GMM 25	
2023	EMS Earth-Mix Space SS2	GMMTV	
2023	Project Alpha	GMM 25	Ep. 7
2023	Arm Share	GMMTV	Ep. 133
2023–2024	EMS Earth-Mix Space Special	GMMTV	
2024	School Rangers – Extra Chapter: Once Upon a Ranger	GMM 25	
2024	Fully Booked	GMMTV	
2024	Arm Share	GMMTV	Ep. 149
2024	Talk with Toeys	GMMTV	Ep. 104
2024	TayNew Meal Date Special	GMMTV	Ep. 18
2024	The Wall Song	Workpoint TV	Ep. 201
2025	High Season แคมป์ซ่าฮาทุกฤดู Season 3 Winter	One 31, GMMTV	Ep. 1–4
2025	Arm Share	GMMTV	Ep. 174
2025	Goodbye ตายไม่รู้ตัว	Workpoint TV	Ep. 49
2026	Face Off	Workpoint TV	3 February 2026

=== Music video appearances ===
Year	Title	Artist	Label	Ref.
2019	"หาเรื่องเจ็บตัว"	Pun Basher	Genierock	
2021	"ครึ่งชีวิต (ทั้งจิตใจ)"	New Jiew	White Music	
2026	"ห้ามแต (No One Can)"; Only Friends: Dream On OST	Gawin Caskey	GMMTV Records	
2026	"ไม่ยอม (All In)"; Only Friends: Dream On OST	Mix Sahaphap	GMMTV Records	

== Discography ==
=== Singles ===
==== Collaborations ====
Year	Title	Label	Ref.
2022	"รับผิดชอบใจฉันด้วย (Love Response)" with Mix Sahaphap, Sizzy	GMMTV Records	
2023	"Save All Memories in This House" with Mix Sahaphap, Off Jumpol, Gun Atthaphan, Joong Archen, Dunk Natachai, Jimmy Jitaraphol, Sea Tawinan, Neo Trai, Louis Thanawin	GMMTV Records	
2024	"You're My Treasure" with Mix, Pond, Phuwin, Force, Book, Joong, Dunk, Jimmy, Sea, First, Khaotung, Gemini, Fourth, Winny, Satang, Perth, Chimon	GMMTV Records	
2026	"Love Feels So Fast" with Mix, Boun, Prem, Pond, Phuwin, Force, Book, Joong, Dunk, Jimmy, Sea, First, Khaotung, Gemini, Fourth, Perth, Santa, William, Est, Junior, Mark, Joss, Gawin	GMMTV Records	

==== Soundtrack appearances ====
Year	Title	Album	Label	Ref.
2021	"สายตาโกหกไม่เป็น (Eyes Can't Lie)"	A Tale of Thousand Stars OST	GMMTV Records	
2021	"นิทานพันดาว (1000 Stars) [ภูผา Version]"	A Tale of Thousand Stars OST	GMMTV Records	
2022	"พิ่งรู้ (Never Knew)" with Mix Sahaphap	Cupid's Last Wish OST	GMMTV Records	
2022	"ไม่ไกลหัวใจ (Closer)" with Mix Sahaphap	Cupid's Last Wish OST	GMMTV Records	
2023	"The Moon Represents My Heart" (Cover) with Mix, First, Khaotung, Gemini, Fourth	Moonlight Chicken OST	GMMTV Records	
2023	"ผาเคียงดาว (No Matter What)" with Mix Sahaphap	Our Skyy 2 OST	GMMTV Records	
2024	"สะมะกึ๊กสะมะกั๊ก (Stuckling)" with Mix Sahaphap (feat. Jennie Panhan)	Ossan's Love Thailand OST	GMMTV Records	
2025	"แต้มบุญ (Lucky Fan)"	Ossan's Love Thailand OST	GMMTV Records	
2025	"คนที่ตามหา (You Are My Best)" with Mix Sahaphap	Ossan's Love Thailand OST	GMMTV Records	
2025	"จองไว้ (Until)"	Ossan's Love Thailand OST	GMMTV Records	
2026	"ปิดฉาก (Dejavu)" with Mix Sahaphap	Only Friends: Dream On OST	GMMTV Records	
2026	"เอาเลยมั้ย (Let's Try)" Dream On Ver. with Mix, Joss, Gawin, Aou, Boom	Only Friends: Dream On OST	GMMTV Records	

== Fan meetings ==
Solo

Title	Date	Venue	Ref.
Falling in Love: Earth Fan Meeting in Shanghai	17 January 2026	Shanghai, China	

Joint

Title	Date	Venue	Notes	Ref.
EarthNew Fan Meeting in Guangzhou	18 July 2017	Poly World Trade Center Expo, Guangzhou	With New	
EarthNew Fan Meeting in Taipei	23 June 2018	Clapper Studio, Syntrend Creative Park	With New	
TayNew & Earth Fan Meeting in Manila	22 December 2018	TIU Theater, Manila	With Tay, New	
Wonderful Day: EarthMix Fan Meeting in Vietnam	4 December 2022	Hoa Binh Theater	With Mix	
Opening Night: Moonlight Chicken	8 February 2023	Ballroom Hall 1–2, Queen Sirikit National Convention Center	With Moonlight Chicken cast	
GMMTV Fan Day 2 in Osaka	25–26 February 2023	Dojima River Forum	With Mix	
Moonlight Chicken Final EP. Fan Meeting	2 March 2023	True Icon Hall, Iconsiam	With Moonlight Chicken cast	
GMMTV Fan Day 3 in Seoul	22 April 2023	Guro-gu Community Center	With Mix	
EarthMix Fan Meeting in Taipei	13 May 2023	Original ATT Show Box Da Zhi	With Mix	
EarthMix Fan Meeting in Hong Kong	9 June 2023	Rotunda 2,3/F, KITEC	With Mix	
Fly to the Moon: EarthMix Fan Meeting in Vietnam	22 July 2023	The Adora Center	With Mix	
EarthMix Fan Meeting in Manila	30 July 2023	SM North EDSA Skydome	With Mix	
EarthMix Fan Meeting in Macau	6 January 2024	H853 Entertainment Place	With Mix	
Memories of You: EarthMix Fan Meeting in Vietnam	30 March 2024	Hoa Binh Theater	With Mix	
Destined Night: EarthMix Fan Meeting in Hong Kong	21 June 2024	Rotunda 2,3/F, KITEC	With Mix	
Ossan's Love: First-Eye-View	6 January 2025	SF World Cinema, CentralWorld	With Ossan's Love Thailand cast	
EarthMix Fan Meeting in Taipei	23 February 2025	Zepp New Taipei, Honhui Plaza	With Mix	
Ossan's Love Final EP. Fan Meeting	24 March 2025	Siam Pavalai Royal Grand Theater, Siam Paragon	With Ossan's Love Thailand cast	
Love Beyond Eternity: EarthMix Fan Meeting in Hong Kong	30 March 2025	Regala Skycity Hotel	With Mix	
GMMTV Fan Day 24 in Singapore	6 September 2025	D'Marquee, Downtown East	With Mix	
EarthMix Fan Meeting in Mexico	21 September 2025	Frontón Bucareli, Cuauhtémoc	With Mix	
Only Friends: Dream On The Play Begins	27 February 2026	Centralworld Pulse Hall, Centralworld	With Only Friends: Dream On cast	
EarthMix Fan Meeting in Berlin	22 March 2026	Estrel Hotel, Berlin	With Mix	
Only Friends: Dream On Final EP. Fan Meeting	15 May 2026	MCC Hall, The Mall Lifestore Bangkapi	With Only Friends: Dream On cast	
Only Friends: Dream On Americas Tour: Only Friends: Dream On in Mexico City	9 September 2026	Expo Reforma, Mexico City	With Only Friends: Dream On cast	
Only Friends: Dream On Americas Tour: Only Friends: Dream On in Lima	12 September 2026	Parque de la Exposición, Lima	With Only Friends: Dream On cast	
Only Friends: Dream On Americas Tour: Only Friends: Dream On in Brazil	14 September 2026	Teatro Renault, São Paulo	With Only Friends: Dream On cast	
GMMTV Fan Day 41 in Tokyo	13 February 2027	New Pier Hall, Tokyo	With Mix	

== Concerts ==
Title	Date	Venue	Notes	Ref.
Y I Love U Fan Party	3 September 2017	Thunder Dome, Muang Thong Thani	With New, Krist, Singto, Off, Gun, Tay, Sing, Got, Amp, Gun Achi	
Y I Love U Fan Party 2019 next to Ha Island Y	26-27 January 2019	Thunder Dome, Muang Thong Thani	With Krist, Singto, Off, Gun, Tay, New, Drake, Frank, Oaujun, Fiat, Guy, Nammon, Neo, Phuwin	
GMMTV Fan Fest 2022: Japan	27–28 August 202$	Pia Arena MM	With Mix, Krist, Off, Gun, Tay, New, Bright, Win, Ohm, Nanon, Dew, Nani	
Feel Fan Fun Camping Concert	15 October 2022	Union Hall, Union Mall	With Mix, Pond, Phuwin, Joong, Dunk	
Love Out Loud Fan Fest 2023: Lovolution	24–25 June 2023	Royal Paragon Hall, Siam Paragon	With Mix, Pond, Phuwin, Ohm, Nanon, Force, Book, Joong, Dunk, Jimmy, Sea, First, Khaotung, Gemini, Fourth	
GMMTV Fan Fest 2023: Japan	9 October 2023	Pia Arena MM	With Mix, Ohm, Nanon, Pond, Phuwin, Force, Book, Joong, Dunk, Jimmy, Sea, First, Khaotung, Gemini, Fourth, Perth, Chimon, Gawin, Krist	
GMMTV Musicon Jakarta	16 December 2023	Pullman Jakarta Central Park	With Nanon, Gawin, Fourth, Satang, Perth, Ford, LYKN	
GMMTV Happy Weekend: Friday Fineday	23 February 2024	Tachikawa Stage Garden	With Tay, Phuwin, Sea, Khaotung, Gemini, Perth	
Love Out Loud Fan Fest 2024: The Love Pirates	18–19 May 2024	Impact Arena, Muang Thong Thani	With Mix, Pond, Phuwin, Force, Book, Joong, Dunk, Jimmy, Sea, First, Khaotung, Gemini, Fourth, Winny, Satang, Perth, Chimon	
GMMTV Fan Fest 2024: Macau	12 December 2024	Galaxy Arena, Macau	With Mix, Off, Gun, Tay, New, Boun, Prem, Force, Book, Joong, Dunk, Jimmy, Sea, First, Khaotung, Milk, Love	
Love Out Loud Fan Fest 2025: Lovemosphere	17–18 May 2025	Impact Arena, Muang Thong Thani	With Mix, Boun, Prem, Pond, Phuwin, Force, Book, Joong, Dunk, Jimmy, Sea, First, Khaotung, Gemini, Fourth, Winny, Satang, Perth, Santa, William, Est	
Love Out Loud Fan Fest 2026: Heart Race	22–24 May 2026	Impact Arena, Muang Thong Thani	With Mix, Boun, Prem, Pond, Phuwin, Force, Book, Joong, Dunk, Jimmy, Sea, First, Khaotung, Gemini, Fourth, Perth, Santa, William, Est, Junior, Mark, Joss, Gawin	
Feel Fun Fan Party Concert	25–26 July 2026	Union Hall, Union Mall	With Mix, Boun, Prem, First, Khaotung	

== Awards and nominations ==
Award nominations for Pirapat Watthanasetsiri
Year	Award	Category	Nominee(s)	Result	Ref.
2021	Thailand Master Youth	Artists, Singers, Actors	—N/a	Won	
2021	7th Maya Awards	Best Couple (with Mix Sahaphap)	A Tale of Thousand Stars	Nominated	
2021	3rd Zoomdara Awards	Best Couple (with Mix Sahaphap)	A Tale of Thousand Stars	Nominated	
2021	1st Siam Series Award	Best Couple (with Mix Sahaphap)	A Tale of Thousand Stars	Nominated	
2021	1st Siam Series Award	Popular Lead Actor	A Tale of Thousand Stars	Won	
2021	1st Siam Series Award	Best Scene (with Mix Sahaphap)	A Tale of Thousand Stars	Nominated	
2021	Howe Awards 2020	Best Couple (with Mix Sahaphap)	A Tale of Thousand Stars	Won	
2022	Maya Entertain Awards 2022	Best Couple (with Mix Sahaphap)	A Tale of Thousand Stars	Nominated	
2022	Kazz Awards 2022	Best Couple (with Mix Sahaphap)	A Tale of Thousand Stars	Nominated	
2022	Kazz Awards 2022	Best Actor	A Tale of Thousand Stars	Nominated	
2022	Line Sticker Thailand Awards	Best Couple (with Mix Sahaphap)	—N/a	Won	
2024	28th Asian Television Awards	Best Theme Song	"The Moon Represents My Heart"	Nominated	
2024	Maya TV Awards 2024	Supporting Actor of the Year	Find Yourself	Won	
2026	Japan Expo Thailand Award 2026	Actor Award (with Mix Sahaphap)	—N/a	Won	
