= Magic of Zero =

2022 Thai television series

- Official series poster
- Genre: Drama; Romantic fantasy
- Directed by: Bundit Sintanaparadee
- Starring: Pansa Vosbein; Pattranite Limpatiyakorn; Tontawan Tantivejakul; Jirawat Sutivanichsak; Pirapat Watthanasetsiri; Sahaphap Wongratch
- Country of origin: Thailand
- Original language: Thai
- No. of episodes: 3

Production
- Running time: 48 minutes
- Production companies: GMMTV; Dee Hup House

Original release
- Network: GMM 25; YouTube
- Release: 11 August – 25 September 2022

Related
- Bad Buddy; Cupid's Last Wish

Magic of Zero is a Thai romantic anthology television miniseries produced by GMMTV together with Dee Hup House, in collaboration with the beverage company Oishi. Consisting of three standalone episodes, the series follows three distinct couples: Ink and Pa from Bad Buddy (2021), Korn and Win from Cupid's Last Wish (2022), and Fong and Maki in an original storyline. It officially premiered on GMM 25 and GMMTV YouTube channel on August 11, 2022, and ran until September 25, 2022.

== Synopsis ==
=== Episode 1: Zero Photography ===
Ink (Milk Pansa) and Pa (Love Pattranite) have been in a relationship for a long time, but Pa grows tired of constantly having her picture taken by her girlfriend. Following an unexpected event, Pa magically travels back in time to her high school days. She revisits the exact moment when Ink secretly took her very first photograph, allowing Pa to rediscover the meaning behind Ink's passion.

=== Episode 2: Zero in the Moonlight ===
Maki (Tu Tontawan) is a talented graphic designer who suffers from a unique phobia: she is terrified of round and circular objects. Her life becomes complicated when she is assigned to collaborate with Fong (Dew Jirawat), a charming new designer who is highly popular with women. Because Fong constantly wears round-framed glasses, Maki finds herself constantly avoiding eye contact with him, creating a hurdle in both their professional and personal relationship.

=== Episode 3: Zero Supporter ===
Korn (Earth Pirapat) dreams of opening a new bakery in Bangkok, prompting Win (Mix Sahaphap) to leave his familiar ranch life behind to support his partner's ambition. However, the immense stress and chaos of managing the new business project cause the romance between the two to fade. After a heated argument, a sudden accident causes Korn and Win to switch bodies, forcing them to literally walk in each other's shoes to save their relationship.

== Cast and characters ==
=== Zero Photography ===
==== Main ====
- Pansa Vosbein (Milk) as Ink
- Pattranite Limpatiyakorn (Love) as Pa

==== Supporting ====
- Sureeyares Yakares (Prigkhing) as Som
- Phatchatorn Thanawat (Ployphach) as Meen

=== Zero in the Moonlight ===
==== Main ====
- Jirawat Sutivanichsak (Dew) as Fong
- Tontawan Tantivejakul (Tu) as Maki

==== Supporting ====
- Manita Chobchuen (Om) as Jib
- Pattaravadee Boonmeesup (Earn) as Oom
- Duangjai Hiransri (Phiao) as Maki's mother

=== Zero Supporter ===
==== Main ====
- Pirapat Watthanasetsiri (Earth) as Korn
- Sahaphap Wongratch (Mix) as Win

==== Supporting ====
- Thanaboon Wanlopsirinun (Na) as Phat
