= Wannarat Wattadalimma =

Thai actor (born 1999)

- วรรณรัตน์ วัฒดาลิมมา
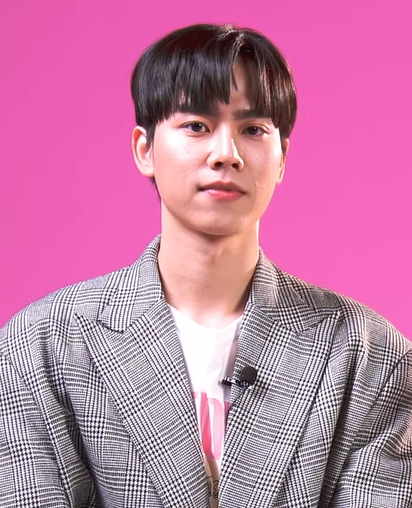
- Sunny in 2023
- Born: 12 December 1999 (age 26); Thailand
- Other name: Sunny (ซันนี่)
- Education: Chulalongkorn University (Political Science)
- Occupation: Actor
- Years active: 2021–present
- Agent: Me Mind Y (until 2025)
- Height: 1.86 m (6 ft 1 in)

Wannarat Wattadalimma (Thai: วรรณรัตน์ วัฒดาลิมมา; born 12 December 1999), nicknamed Sunny (Thai: ซันนี่), is a Thai actor. He started acting in 2021 with the series Top Secret Together on LINE TV. A year later, he appeared in Thank You Teacher on TrueID. That same year, he got a lead role in the BL series Wedding Plan, which aired on GMM 25. In 2025, he played the lead in the film The CEO (ไอ้เป๊าะ CEO ม.6), which came out in Thai theaters.

== Career ==
Sunny's first acting job was in 2021, playing MaiEak in Top Secret Together. In 2023, he had a supporting role as Nueng in Thank You Teacher, which aired on TrueID.

Later that year, he landed the main role in Wedding Plan, a Me Mind Y production that aired on GMM 25 and iQIYI. The series is based on a novel by MAME (May Ornwan Vichyawankul).

In 2025, Sunny made his movie debut with The CEO (ไอ้เป๊าะ CEO ม.6), where he played the main character Por.

== Filmography ==
=== Television series ===
Year	Title	Role	Notes	Network/Platform	Ref.
2021	Top Secret Together	MaiEak	Main role	LINE TV, GagaOOLala	
2023	Thank You Teacher	Nueng	Supporting role	TrueID	
2023	Wedding Plan	Sailom (Lom)	Main role	GMM 25, iQIYI	
TBA	Neptune in The Sky	Heman	Supporting role		

=== Film ===
Year	Title	Role	Notes	Ref.
2025	The CEO	Por	Main role	

== Discography ==
=== Soundtrack appearances ===
Year	Title	Artist(s)	Notes	Ref.
2023	"คลั่งรัก (My one and only)"	Sunny Wannarat	Wedding Plan OST	
2023	"You คู่ Me"	Sunny Wannarat and Pak Naphat	Wedding Plan OST	

== Live events ==
Year	Date	Title	Location	Ref.
2023	16 September	Wedding Plan Special Episode and After Party	Major Cineplex Ratchayothin, Bangkok, Thailand	
2023	28 August	Sunny Pak (รวมพล Gathering) Artists Meeting Day	Union Mall, Bangkok, Thailand	

== Television programs ==
Year	Title	Role	Episode(s)	Ref.
2019	Jen Jud God Jig	Guest	Ep. 18	
2020	SosatSeoulsay	Guest	Ep. 198–199	
2022	Khun Phra Chuai	Guest	11 September 2022	
2023	Funday Season 8	Guest	Ep. 19	
