= Blacklist (Thai TV series) =

2019 Thai television series

- Official series poster
- Thai: นักเรียนลับ บัญชีดำ
- Genre: Teen Drama; Mystery; Action; Romance
- Created by: GMMTV
- Based on: Blacklist (ปิดบัญชีลับฉีกกฏหัวใจให้เรารักกัน); Black Date (เดตลับๆ ฉบับเราสองคน); Black Secret (พลิกบัญชีลับซ่อนหัวใจ (ไม่) ให้รักเธอ); Black Kiss (สลับกฎร้ายให้หัวใจบอกรักเธอ); Black Heart (ผมโสดครับ... โปรดรับผิดชอบด้วย); B(l)ack to School (สวัสดีครับ... ยินดีต้อนรับสู่ห้อง 6/6); Black Council (ไอดอลดวงกุด... ขอฉุดหัวใจคุณประธาน)
- Directed by: Worrawech Danuwong
- Starring: Korapat Kirdpan; Wachirawit Ruangwiwat; Pawat Chittsawangdee; Sattabut Laedeke; Kanaphan Puitrakul; Thanatsaran Samthonglai; Preeti Barameeanant; Chanikarn Tangkabodee; Pattranite Limpatiyakorn; Sureeyares Yakares; Benyapa Jeenprasom; Phatchatorn Tanawat; Kanyarat Ruangrung; Wichayanee Pearklin; Napassakorn Midaim
- Country of origin: Thailand
- Original language: Thai
- No. of episodes: 12

Production
- Running time: 50 minutes
- Production companies: GMMTV; Lasercat Studio

Original release
- Network: GMM 25; Line TV
- Release: 13 October – 29 December 2019

Blacklist (Thai: นักเรียนลับ บัญชีดำ; RTGS: Nakrian Lap Banchi Dam; lit. 'Secret Student Blacklist') is a 2019 Thai television series starring Korapat Kirdpan (Nanon), Wachirawit Ruangwiwat (Chimon), Pawat Chittsawangdee (Ohm), Sattabut Laedeke (Drake), Kanaphan Puitrakul (First), Thanatsaran Samthonglai (Frank) and Preeti Barameeanant (Bank).

Directed by Worrawech Danuwong and produced by GMMTV together with Lasercat Studio, the series was one of the thirteen television series for 2019 launched by GMMTV in their "Wonder Th13teen" event on 5 November 2018. It premiered on GMM 25 and Line TV on 13 October 2019, airing on Sundays at 21:25 ICT and 23:00 ICT, respectively. The series concluded on 29 December 2019.

== Synopsis ==
Akeanan is a school not just well-known on education and sports but also of secrets. The mystery surrounding the disappearance of Fah, a student of the school, prompts her brother Traffic to come to Akeanan. He finds himself in Room 4/6 where he meets school outsiders namely Andrew, Highlight, Title, Jim Bae and Bantad — all members of a secret group called "Blacklist" whose purpose is to investigate the mysterious happenings in their school. Traffic later on gets invited by their school teacher to join the said group.

Aside from finding out what happened to Fah, "Blacklist" will also uncover the several deep dark secrets of Akeanan.

== Cast and characters ==
=== Main ===
- Korapat Kirdpan (Nanon) as Traffic
- Wachirawit Ruangwiwat (Chimon) as Andrew
- Pawat Chittsawangdee (Ohm) as Highlight
- Sattabut Laedeke (Drake) as Title
- Kanaphan Puitrakul (First) as Jim Bae
- Thanatsaran Samthonglai (Frank) as Bantad
- Preeti Barameeanant (Bank) as Mr. Wanpadej

=== Supporting ===
- Chanikarn Tangkabodee (Prim) as Melon
- Pattranite Limpatiyakorn (Love) as Phukkad
- Benyapa Jeenprasom (View) as Carrot
- Sureeyares Yakares (Prigkhing) as Orange
- Phatchatorn Tanawat (Ployphach) as Cupcake
- Kanyarat Ruangrung (Piploy) as Laila
- Napassakorn Midaim as Principal Karin
- Wichayanee Pearklin (Gam) as Ms. Jinmanee
- Pahun Jiyacharoen (Marc) as Viking
- Jirakit Kuariyakul (Toptap) as Dark
- Pumipat Paiboon (Prame) as Champ
- Thanawat Rattanakitpaisan (Khaotung) as Joe
- Praeploy Oree as Pim
- Chayakorn Jutamas (JJ) as Bacon

=== Guest ===
- Natouch Siripongthon (Fluke) as Nattee
- Juthapich Indrajundra (Jamie) as Kiwi
- Phollawat Manuprasert (Tom) as Jim Bae's father
- Chinnapat Kittichaiwarangkul (Flute) as Jerd
- Ploy Sornarin as Fah (Traffic's sister)
- Papangkorn Lerkchaleampote (Beam) as Young Wanpadej
- Tytan Teepprasan as Pai
- Krittanai Arsalprakit (Nammon) as Manas

== Soundtrack ==
Blacklist Soundtrack
| No. | Title | Writer(s) | Artist | Length |
|---|---|---|---|---|
| 1. | "Pok (ปก)" | KangsomKS | KangsomKS | 3:14 |
