= Find Yourself (Thai TV series) =

2023 Thai television series

- Official series poster
- Thai: หารักด้วยใจเธอ
- Genre: Romantic comedy
- Directed by: Varayu Rukskul; Khets Thunthup
- Starring: Taksaorn Paksukcharern; Chanon Santinatornkul; Saharat Sangkapreecha
- Opening theme: "I Missing You" by Mook Worranit
- Country of origin: Thailand
- Original language: Thai
- No. of episodes: 16

Production
- Running time: 50 minutes
- Production companies: GMMTV; Insight Entertainment

Original release
- Network: GMM 25; Viu
- Release: 18 December 2023 – 13 February 2024

Related
- Find Yourself (2020)

Find Yourself (Thai: หารักด้วยใจเธอ; RTGS: Ha Rak Duai Jai Thoe) is a Thai television series starring Taksaorn Paksukcharern (Aff), Chanon Santinatornkul (Non) and Saharat Sangkapreecha (Kong). It is a remake of the 2020 Chinese television series of the same name.

Directed by Varayu Rukskul (Petch) alongside Khets Thunthup and produced by GMMTV together with Insight Entertainment, it was announced as one of the television series of GMMTV for 2023 during their "GMMTV2023: Diversely Yours" event held on November 22, 2022. It officially premiered on GMM 25 and Viu on December 18, 2023, and ran until February 13, 2024. It aired simultaneously in China on Tencent Video and Youku.

== Synopsis ==
Yin (Aff Taksaorn), a successful managing director, is frequently set up on blind dates by her mischievous younger brother, Yang (Earth Pirapat). Her situation changes when she becomes involved with Shane (Non Chanon), a handsome intern, and the two agree to a three-month trial relationship. However, the dynamic becomes complicated when Ray (Kong Saharat), a wealthy businessman, also decides to pursue a relationship with her. Caught in this love triangle, Yin must navigate her feelings for both men to discover who she truly loves before the three-month agreement concludes.

== Cast and characters ==
=== Main ===
- Taksaorn Paksukcharern (Aff) as Yin
- Chanon Santinatornkul (Non) as Shane
- Saharat Sangkapreecha (Kong) as Ray
- Pirapat Watthanasetsiri (Earth) as Yang
- Panitsara Yang (Emma) as Mint

=== Supporting ===
- Suphakorn Sriphotong (Pod) as Champ
- Neen Suwanamas as Sandy
- Yuwadee Ruangchai (Pu) as Duean
- Kittiphong Dumavibhat (Kroi) as Korn
- Gvinphon Phanitphong (Gumpun) as Man
- Onhathai Suesrisawat (Pupe) as Mook
- Melissa Ann Wonson (Lissa) as Kratae
- Jutatip Seangwan (Cherrie) as Opal
- Penpat Kairapee (Praifah) as Jan
- Jiraphat Sodjam (Jaonine) as Tar

== Soundtrack ==
Song title	Artist	Ref.
I Missing You	Mook Worranit	
