= Neptune in The Sky =

2026 Thai television series

- Poster
- Thai: ดวงดาวในเวหา
- Genre: Mystery; Comedy; Romance; Drama; Boys' love (BL)
- Based on: ดวงดาวในเวหา by SweetyN
- Starring: Thanatsaran Samthonglai (Frank); Thakorn Kanthatham (Kim); Wannarat Wattadalimma (Sunny); Gameplay Garnpaphon Laolerkiat
- Country of origin: Thailand
- Original language: Thai

Production
- Producer: Kuan Denkhun Ngamnet
- Production company: Triple Trio Studio

Original release
- Network: Triple Trio Studio Channel
- Release: 2026

Neptune in the Sky (Thai: ดวงดาวในเวหา) is a upcoming Thai television series in the mystery, comedy, romance, drama, and boys' love (BL) genres, starring Thakorn Kanthatham (Kim) and Thanatsaran Samthonglai (Frank). The series also stars Wannarat Wattadalimma (Sunny) and Garnpaphon Laolerkiat (Gameplay) in supporting roles.

The series is based on the novel ดวงดาวในเวหา by SweetyN and is scheduled for release in 2026.

== Synopsis ==
Neptune is a pop star who decides to step away from the spotlight after becoming involved in a public scandal. Seeking freedom and anonymity abroad, he rents a shared room in the hope of finally living a quiet life.

His attempt to escape fame does not go as planned when he discovers that his new roommate is Kyo, his former senior from high school. Organized, stubborn, and persistent, Kyo begins living with Neptune amid misunderstandings, everyday situations, and an attraction that gradually resurfaces between them.

== Cast ==
=== Main ===
- Thanatsaran Samthonglai (Frank) as Kyo
- Thakorn Kanthatham (Kim) as Neptune

=== Supporting ===
- Wannarat Wattadalimma (Sunny) as Heman
- Gameplay Garnpaphon Laolerkiat as Film
- Yoon Phusanu Wongsavanischakorn as Nakrop
- Gun Napat Na Ranong as Tee
- Boom Thanut Jiraratchakit as Thup
- New Chunnawan Mandee as Mekfhon
- Leo Peerapun Chungcharoenpanich as Gun
- Babe Pasutwich Tangcharoenrungrueang as Demon

== Production ==
The series is produced by Thai studio Triple Trio Studio and is based on the novel ดวงดาวในเวหา by SweetyN, with Kuan Denkhun Ngamnet serving as producer.

Thanatsaran Samthonglai (Frank) portrays Kyo, while Thakorn Kanthatham (Kim) portrays Neptune. The supporting cast includes Wannarat Wattadalimma (Sunny), Gameplay Garnpaphon Laolerkiat, Yoon Phusanu Wongsavanischakorn, Gun Napat Na Ranong, Boom Thanut Jiraratchakit, New Chunnawan Mandee, Leo Peerapun Chungcharoenpanich, and Babe Pasutwich Tangcharoenrungrueang. Earth Kantachote was initially set to portray Neptune, but was later replaced by Kim.

Neptune in the Sky is scheduled for release in 2026. The series was confirmed to initially premiere through the Triple Trio Studio channel, although an exact release date has not yet been announced. Casting for the series was held in Taiwan and Thailand.
