= Revamp The Undead Story =

2025 Thai television series

- Official series poster
- Genre: Boys' love; Fantasy; Supernatural; Romantic drama
- Screenplay by: Chalermpong Udomsilp; Thanaporn Phetcharas
- Directed by: Siwaj Sawatmaneekul; Natthanon Kheeddee
- Starring: Noppanut Guntachai; Warut Chawalitrujiwong
- Opening theme: "ลิขิต (UNDER THE MOONLIGHT)" by Boun Noppanut and Prem Warut
- Composer: Tanatat Chaiyaat
- Country of origin: Thailand
- Original language: Thai
- No. of episodes: 10

Production
- Executive producers: Sataporn Panichraksapong; Darapa Choeysanguan
- Producer: Nuttapong Mongkolsawas
- Cinematography: Saran Jantharakkha; Chonticha Suttiphaet
- Running time: 50 minutes
- Production companies: GMMTV; Studio Wabi Sabi

Original release
- Network: GMM25; iQIYI
- Release: 23 August – 25 October 2025

Revamp The Undead Story is a 2025 Thai boys' love television series starring Noppanut Guntachai (Boun) and Warut Chawalitrujiwong (Prem). Originally developed by Studio Wabi Sabi under the title Vampire Project, the series was first announced on 23 November 2023. Following the expiration of the lead actors' contracts, the production rights transitioned to GMMTV, which rebranded the project as Revamp The Undead Story and co-produces the series alongside Studio Wabi Sabi.

Directed by Siwaj Sawatmaneekul and Natthanon Kheeddee, it was reintroduced as one of the television series of GMMTV for 2024 during their "GMMTV2024: UP&ABOVE Part 2" event on 23 April 2024. The series aired on GMM25 and iQIYI from 23 August 2025 to 25 October 2025.

== Plot ==
Punn (Warut Chawalitrujiwong), the owner of a vintage shop, is asked by a gallery-owning friend to restore a painting vandalized under mysterious circumstances. While working on it, Punn accidentally injures himself, staining the artwork with his blood. This act awakens Ramil (Noppanut Guntachai), the last descendant of a vampire lineage who had been trapped within the painting for over a century. Ramil emerges without his powers and is immediately pursued by Hunters. Punn must help Ramil reclaim his lost abilities by tracking down Ramil's former servants, who now live discreetly among humans.

== Cast ==
=== Main ===
- Noppanut Guntachai (Boun) as Ramil Soleil Jonoel
- Warut Chawalitrujiwong (Prem) as Punn Winnala

=== Supporting ===
- Jiruntanin Trairattanayon (Mark) as Methuselah Soleil (Methas)
- Tinnasit Isarapongporn (Barcode) as Ciarán Soleil (Ciar)
- Napat Patcharachavalit (Aun) as Marquise Soleil (Mekhin)
- Kay Lertsittichai as Jett
- Ploynira Hiruntaveesin (Kapook) as Elise
- Chayapol Jutamas (AJ) as Paul
- Chayakorn Jutamas (JJ) as Caster
- Panachkorn Rueksiriaree (Stamp) as Pokpong (Pong)

=== Guest ===
- Tanan Lohawatanakul (Paul) as Young Jett / boy in church (Ep. 1, 3, 5, 9–10)
- Wacharin Anantapong (Rina) as Nun (Ep. 1, 3, 9)
- Phatchatorn Thanawat (Ployphach) as Lilith (Ep. 2, 6)
- Rutricha Phapakithi (Ciize) as Mariah (Vampire) (Ep. 3–4)
- Supakorn Kantanit (Guitar) as Young Punn (Ep. 4–5, 10)
- Thamonchita Namkool (Mantra) as Young Elise (Ep. 4–5, 9–10)
- Natachai Boonprasert (Dunk) as Feratu / Father Dracul (Ep. 8–10)
- Julaluck Chulanon (Omyim) as Hunter
- Way-Ar Sangngern (Joss) as Mark Amarittrakul (cameo, Ep. 1)
- Gawin Caskey as Tong (cameo, Ep. 1)
- Panachai Sriariyarungruang (Junior) as Mun Dal (cameo, Ep. 10)

== Original soundtrack ==
The official soundtrack for Revamp the Undead Story features:

Song	Artist(s)	Label	Ref.
"ลิขิต (UNDER THE MOONLIGHT)"	Boun Noppanut and Prem Warut	GMMTV Records	
"ค่ำคืนที่รอแสงสว่าง (Midnight Light)"	Boun Noppanut	GMMTV Records	
"ชั่วนิรันดร์ตลอดกาล (Lunar Vow)"	Prem Warut	GMMTV Records	

== Production ==
The series was originally developed by Studio Wabi Sabi under the working title The Vampire Project and was first announced on November 23, 2023. Following the expiration of the lead actors' contracts and their subsequent signing with GMMTV, the production rights transitioned to GMMTV. The project was rebranded as Revamp The Undead Story and officially re-announced as part of the "GMMTV2024: UP&ABOVE Part 2" event on 23 April 2024.

While GMMTV holds the ownership and broadcasting rights, the series is co-produced with Studio Wabi Sabi. Some cast changes were made during this transition, and the original pilot trailer produced by Studio Wabi Sabi was subsequently removed from public platforms. The series is directed by Siwaj Sawatmaneekul and Natthanon Kheeddee, with lead actor Noppanut Guntachai credited as a writer.

== Reception ==
The series holds a rating of 6.5 on IMDb based on audience scores. Critical reception has been mixed; while the lead actors' chemistry and the cinematography were noted by reviewers, some found the tone lighter than typical for a vampire fantasy and the narrative execution inconsistent.
