= Wedding Plan =

2023 Thai television series

- Thai: แผนการ(รัก)ร้ายของนายเจ้าบ่าว
- Literally: Wedding Plan
- Genre: Romantic comedy; Romantic drama; Boys' love
- Based on: Wedding Plan (แผนการ(รัก)ร้ายของนายเจ้าบ่าว) by MAME
- Written by: MAME
- Directed by: Neti Suwanjinda
- Starring: Wannarat Wattadalimma; Naphat Leelahatorn; Orapan Phongmaykin; Sasisarun Phiboonrattapong; Kashane Pichetsopon; Suppawit Thongyuen
- Country of origin: Thailand
- Original language: Thai
- No. of episodes: 7

Production
- Running time: 50 minutes
- Production company: Me Mind Y

Original release
- Network: GMM 25; iQIYI
- Release: 19 July – 30 August 2023

Wedding Plan (Thai: แผนการ(รัก)ร้ายของนายเจ้าบ่าว) is a 2023 Thai television series in the romantic comedy, romantic drama and boys' love (BL) genres, directed by Neti Suwanjinda (Ne) and produced by Me Mind Y. The screenplay is based on the novel of the same name by writer MAME.

The series aired from 19 July to 30 August 2023, with weekly episodes on Wednesdays on GMM 25. It was also made available on iQIYI (Uncut version).

== Synopsis ==
Namnuea is a professional wedding planner. He is assigned to organize the wedding of Sailom, a young businessman, with Yiwa.

What Namnuea doesn't know is that the wedding is just a setup for their families. Yiwa is already in a relationship with Marine. While working on the event, Namnuea grows close to Sailom, and the two develop feelings for each other.

== Cast and characters ==
=== Main ===
- Wannarat Wattadalimma (Sunny) as Sailom (Lom)
- Naphat Leelahatorn (Pak ) as Namnuea
- Orapan Phongmaykin (Aya) as Yiwa
- Sasisarun Phiboonrattapong (Kate) as Marine
- Kashane Pichetsopon (Forth) as Sun
- Suppawit Thongyuen (Donut) as Ryu

=== Supporting ===
- Akhamsiri Suwanasuk (JakJaan) as Imm
- Wacharin Anantapong (Rina) as Lom's mother

=== Guest ===
- Chaikamon Sermsongwittaya (Boss) as Payu
- Nuttarat Tangwai (Noeul) as Rain
- Thitipong Sangngey (Fort) as Prapai
- Wasuthorn Chaijindar (Peat) as Sky

== Production ==
The series was announced by Me Mind Y in early 2023. The blessing ceremony took place on 11 March 2023, with the cast and crew in attendance. The director was Neti Suwanjinda (Ne), and the executive producer was MAME, author of the original novel.

The official trailer was released before the premiere. A special episode was later screened at a fan-only event.

== Release ==
The series premiered on 19 July 2023 on GMM 25, airing weekly on Wednesdays at 11:00 p.m. (local time). The uncut version was made available on iQIYI. The final episode aired on 30 August 2023. In September 2023, a closing event titled "Wedding Plan Special Episode and After Party" was held with the cast at Major Cineplex Ratchayothin in Bangkok.

== Reception ==
On iQIYI, the first episode of the series received a rating of 9.6/10 based on over 22,000 user ratings (platform data). Thai media highlighted the performances of the main cast, most of whom were new actors, as well as the production by Me Mind Y, known for previous successes such as Love in the Air.
