= 'Cause You're My Boy =

2018 Thai television series

- Official series poster
- Thai: อาตี๋ของผม
- Genre: Boys' love; Romantic comedy; Drama
- Created by: GMMTV
- Based on: อาตี๋ของผม by Caffeine
- Directed by: Rachyd Kusolkulsiri
- Starring: Sattabut Laedeke; Thanatsaran Samthonglai
- Country of origin: Thailand
- Original language: Thai
- No. of episodes: 12

Production
- Producer: COSOCOMO
- Running time: 45 minutes
- Production companies: GMMTV; COSOCOMO

Original release
- Network: One31; LINE TV
- Release: 23 June – 22 September 2018

Related
- Our Skyy

'Cause You're My Boy (Thai: อาตี๋ของผม; RTGS: A Ti Khong Phom), also known as My Tee, is a 2018 Thai boys' love television series starring Sattabut Laedeke (Drake) and Thanatsaran Samthonglai (Frank). Directed by Rachyd Kusolkulsiri and produced by GMMTV together with COSOCOMO, the series was one of the ten television series for 2018 showcased by GMMTV in their "Series X" event on 1 February 2018. It premiered on One31 and LINE TV on 23 June 2018, airing on Saturdays at 22:15 ICT and 23:15 ICT, respectively. The series concluded on 22 September 2018.

== Cast and characters ==
=== Main ===
- Sattabut Laedeke (Drake) as Nueamork Jirapakpinit (Mork)
- Thanatsaran Samthonglai (Frank) as Mungkorn Jiaranontanan (Tee)
- Trai Nimtawat (Neo) as Gord
- Phuwin Tangsakyuen as Morn

=== Supporting ===
- Rutricha Phapakithi (Ciize) as Ching
- Sutthipha Kongnawdee (Noon) as Bambie
- Phurikulkrit Chusakdiskulwibul (Amp) as Lek
- Chayapol Jutamas (AJ) as Ton
- Chanokwanun Rakcheep (Took) as Dr. Mui
- Thanawat Rattanakitpaisan (Khaotung) as Au
- Suporn Sangkaphibal as Tee's grandmother

=== Guest ===
- Kittiphong Lerganjanoi (Win) as Arm (Ep. 1)

== Soundtrack ==
Song title	Romanized title	Artist	Ref.
สู้ซ่า	"Soo Za"	Pattadon Janngeon (Fiat); Harit Cheewagaroon (Sing); Phuwin Tangsakyuen (Phuwin)	
ในส่วนที่ลึกที่สุด	"Nai Suan Tee Luek Tee Soot"	Achirawich Saliwattana (Gun)	
