= Sattabut Laedeke =

Thai-American actor (born 2000)

- สัตบุตร แลดิกี
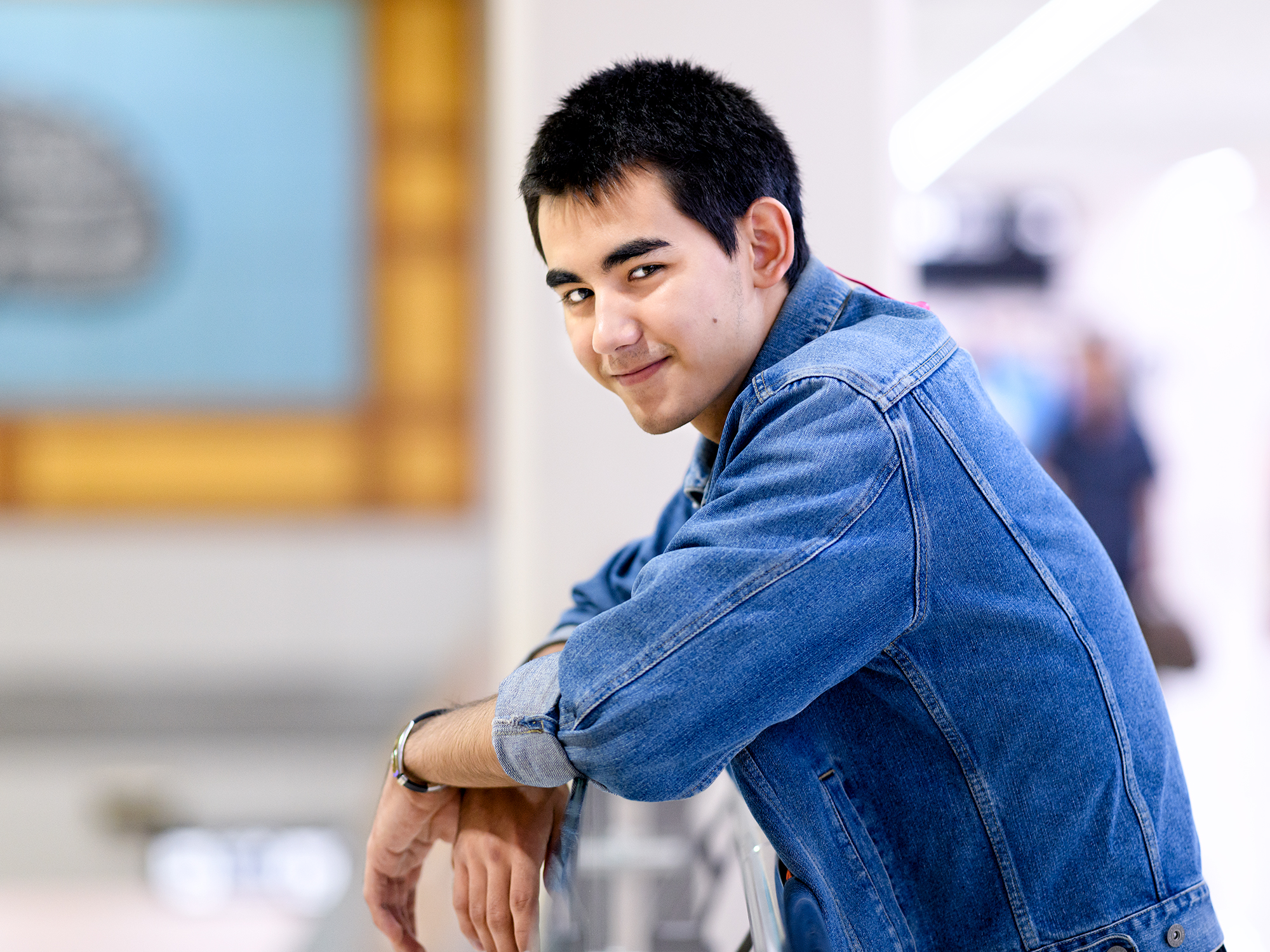
- Sattabut in October 2018
- Born: 1 October 2000 (age 25); Chiang Mai, Thailand
- Other name: Drake/เดรก
- Education: University of the Thai Chamber of Commerce
- Occupation: Actor
- Years active: 2016–present
- Agent: GMMTV (2017–2025)
- Height: 1.80

Sattabut Laedeke (Thai: สัตบุตร แลดิกี, born 1 October 2000), nicknamed Drake, is a Thai-American actor. He gained recognition for his roles as Mork in 'Cause You're My Boy (2018), Title in Blacklist (2019), and Mil in 2gether: The Series (2020).

== Early life and education ==
Sattabut was born in Chiang Mai, Thailand, to an American father and a Thai-Chinese mother. He completed his secondary education at Varee Chiangmai International School and is currently taking up a bachelor's degree in event management under the School of Tourism and Services of the University of the Thai Chamber of Commerce.

== Career ==
Before signing up with GMMTV in 2017, Sattabut made a brief appearance in the Thai series Broken. He played his first supporting role as Pob in the television series, Slam Dance, where he also had his first real-life and on-screen kiss. His first main role was as Mork in the GMMTV series, 'Cause You're My Boy. In 2020, he worked again with his previous 'Cause You're My Boy on-screen partner, Thanatsaran Samthonglai (Frank), in 2gether: The Series and Still 2gether, where they played Mil and Phukong, respectively.

== Campaigns ==
Sattabut teams up with Chayakorn Jutamas (JJ), Benyapa Jeenprasom (View), and Preeyaphat Lawsuwansiri (Earn) to launch a campaign against cyberbullying as part of the "Stop Cyberbullying Fingertip Project." Supported by the Safe and Creative Media Development Fund, the initiative aims to raise awareness about the repercussions of cyberbullying and promote societal comprehension of online harassment.

== Filmography ==
Year	Title	Role	Notes	Ref.
2016	Broken	Drake	Guest role	
2017	Slam Dance	Pob	Support role	
2017	Club Friday Celeb's Stories: Returning	Captain	Guest role	
2018	'Cause You're My Boy	Mork	Main role	
2018	Our Skyy	Mork	Main role	
2019	Blacklist	Title	Main role	
2020	2gether: The Series	Mil	Support role	
2020	Still 2gether	Mil	Support role	
2021	A Tale of Thousand Stars	Rang (Ranger)	Support role	
2021	Dek Thai Jai Sue Sat	Jack	Guest role (Ep. 9)	
2021	Bad Buddy	Korn (Pat's friend)	Support role	
2021	The Player	"Mikey" / Mai-Tree	Support role	
2022	Mama Gogo	Mikhael (Tina's son)	Support role	
2023	A Boss and a Babe	Time	Support role	
2023	UMG (Unidentified Mysterious Girlfriend)	Jack	Support role	
2023	Our Skyy 2	Korn (Pat's friend)	Support role	
2023	Only Friends	Gap (Boston's hookup)	Guest role (Ep. 1, 6–7)	
2024	Beauty Newbie	Mok	Support role	
2024	My Precious	Nicky	Guest role (Ep. 7)	
2024	Wandee Goodday	Plakao	Support role	
2024	Perfect 10 Liners	Cop (Arc's friend)	Support role	
2024	ThamePo: Heart That Skips a Beat	"Tae" Theerapat	Support role	
2025	Ossan's Love Thailand	Ou-noi	Guest role (Ep. 10)	
2025	Break Up Service	Made	Guest role (Ep. 3)	
