= Cupid's Last Wish =

2022 Thai television series

- Official series poster
- Thai: พินัยกรรมกามเทพ
- Genre: Romance; Drama; Supernatural
- Based on: "Phinaikam Kammathep" by Dezair
- Screenplay by: Sakon Wongsinwiset; Pattarawalai Wongsinwises; Rittikrai Kanjanawiphu; Sureechay Kaewses
- Directed by: Sakon Wongsinwiset
- Starring: Pirapat Watthanasetsiri; Sahaphap Wongratch; Ployshompoo Supasap
- Opening theme: "ไม่ไกลหัวใจ (Closer)" by Earth Pirapat and Mix Sahaphap
- Country of origin: Thailand
- Original language: Thai
- No. of episodes: 12

Production
- Executive producers: Sataporn Panichraksapong; Darapa Choeysanguan
- Producer: Noppharnach Chaiyahwimhon
- Cinematography: Pongthorn Thongwattana
- Running time: 45 minutes
- Production companies: GMMTV; Gmo Films

Original release
- Network: GMM 25; Disney+ Hotstar
- Release: February 21 – March 22, 2022

Related
- Magic of Zero

Cupid's Last Wish (Thai: พินัยกรรมกามเทพ lit. 'Cupid's Will') is a 2022 Thai boys' love television series starring Pirapat Watthanasetsiri (Earth), Sahaphap Wongratch (Mix) and Ployshompoo Supasap (Jan) based on the novel by Dezair. It aired on GMM 25 and Disney+ Hotstar on February 21, 2022, airing Mondays and Tuesdays at 18:00 ICT for 12 episodes.

Directed by Sakon Wongsinwiset and produced by GMMTV and Gmo Films, the series was announced at the GMMTV Borderless event on December 1, 2021.

== Synopsis ==
The "will" is only just the starting point of the chaos brought to the Warodom family. When siblings, Win (Sahaphap Wongratch) and Lin (Ployshompoo Supasap), get into a car accident and switch bodies, Win (now in Lin's body) must embark on a journey through the mountains and forests to find "Holy Water" from four temples within seven days, accompanied by his best friend-turned-enemy, Korn (Pirapat Watthanasetsiri), in order to regain his original body. He also has to protect the family farm and compete for his inheritance.

== Cast and characters ==
=== Main ===
- Pirapat Watthanasetsiri (Earth) as Thapakorn Chaiphitak (Korn)
- Sahaphap Wongratch (Mix) as Sawin Warodom (Win)
- Ployshompoo Supasap (Jan) as Lalin Warodom (Lin) / Win

=== Supporting ===
- Nawat Phumphotingam (White) as Chanon (Non)
- Nipawan Taveepornsawan (Kai) as Phonuma Warodom
- Chanagun Arpornsutinan (Gunsmile) as Anucha Woradom (Nu)
- Chayajee Krittayapongsakorn (Geejee) as Inthara Woradom (In)
- Nattharat Kornkaew (Champ) as Khajorn (Jorn)
- Thanaboon Wanlopsirinun (Na) as Phat
- Thawatchai Petchsuk (Nuree) as Saeng
- Darina Boonchu (Nancy) as Sroi
- Shaowanasai Michael as Monk Arun

== Original soundtrack ==
The official soundtrack for Cupid's Last Wish features:

Song	Artist(s)	Label	Ref.
"เพิ่งรู้ (Never Knew)"	Earth Pirapat and Mix Sahaphap	GMMTV Records	
"ไม่ไกลหัวใจ (Closer)"	Earth Pirapat and Mix Sahaphap	GMMTV Records	
