= Ossan's Love Thailand =

2025 Thai television series

- Official series poster
- Thai: รักนี้ให้ "นาย"
- Genre: Comedy; Romance; Boys Love
- Based on: Ossan's Love by Koji Tokuo
- Written by: Bee Pongsate Lucksameepong; Pratchaya Thavornthummarut
- Directed by: Kornprom Niyomsil
- Starring: Pirapat Watthanasetsiri; Sahaphap Wongratch; Shahkrit Yamnam
- Country of origin: Thailand
- Original language: Thai
- No. of episodes: 12

Production
- Producer: Noppharnach Chaiwimol
- Production location: Thailand
- Editor: Prairung Bhandngarn
- Running time: 45–53 minutes

Original release
- Network: GMM 25
- Release: 6 January – 24 March 2025

Related
- Ossan's Love (2014: Japan); Ossan's Love (2021: Hong Kong)

Ossan's Love Thailand (Thai: รักนี้ให้ "นาย"; RTGS: Rak Ni Hai "Nai", lit. 'This Love [Is] for "You/Boss"') is a 2025 Thai boys' love television series, starring Pirapat Watthanasetsiri (Earth), Sahaphap Wongratch (Mix) and Shahkrit Yamnam (Krit), based on the Japanese series Ossan's Love.

The series premiered on GMM 25 on 6 January 2025, airing on Mondays at 20:30 ICT. It was also made available for streaming on Viu at 22:30 ICT. The series concluded on 24 March 2025.

== Synopsis ==
Heng is a property consultant whose life is completely upended when his childhood friend professes her love for him, and his boss and housemate both declare their love for him, forming a tumultuous love triangle.

== Cast and characters ==
=== Main ===
- Pirapat Watthanasetsiri (Earth) as Haran Thanahirankij (Heng)
- Sahaphap Wongratch (Mix) as Hatainutt Nuntacharoensakul (Momo)
- Shahkrit Yamnam (Krit) as Kongdech Attasethakul

=== Supporting ===
- Phudtripart Bhudthonamochai (Ryu) as Narut Jiravarapong (Newyear)
- Thinnaphan Tantui (Thor) as Thayakorn Thadawong (Ten)
- Ploynira Hiruntaveesin (Kapook) as Chanisa Preedasirikul (Chicha)
- Nachcha Chuedang (Parn) as Charanda Attasethakul (Cher-aim)

Kongdech's daughter

- Nattharat Kornkaew (Champ) as Thirakorn Preedasirikul (Thua-ngok)
- Warinda Damrongphol (Dada) as Monwadee Nithitharasakul (Meow)

=== Guest ===
- Pimonwan Hoonthongkam (Pui) as Heng's mother (Ep. 1, 10)
- Kanaphan Puitrakul (First) as Alone (Heng's university mentee) (Ep. 2, 11)
- Thanawat Rattanakitpaisan (Khaotung) as Kaitong (Alone's boyfriend) (Ep. 2, 11)
- Jeeratch Wongpian (Fluke) as JJ (Ep. 7)
- Prariyapit Yu (JingJing) as Rose (Ep. 7)
- Tanaka Kei as Haruta Soichi (Ep. 7)
- Chompoopuntip Temtanamongkol (Acare) as Baimon (Mo's sister) (Ep. 9, 12)
- Jaturong Mokjok as Mo's father (Ep. 9, 12)
- Sirinuch Petchurai (Koi) as Mo's mother (Ep. 9, 12)
- Sattabut Laedeke (Drake) as Ou-noi (Ep. 10)
- Korn Khumraj (Dorn) as dancer (Ep. 10)
- Korapat Kirdpan (Nanon) as himself (Ep. 11)

== Episodes ==
No.	Title	Original release date
1	"Crush (tบดขยี้)"	6 January 2025
2	"Housemate (เพื่อนร่วมบ้าน)"	13 January 2025
3	"Company Outing (การออกนอกบ้านของบริษัท)"	20 January 2025
4	"My Birthday ( วันเกิดของฉัน)"	27 January 2025
5	"The Game (เกม)"	3 February 2025
6	"Stay With Me (อยู่กับฉัน)"	10 February 2025
7	"Secret (ความลับ)"	17 February 2025
8	"Haunted House (บ้านผีสิง)"	24 February 2025
9	"Meet The Parents (พบกับผู้ปกครอง)"	3 March 2025
10	"The Truth (ความจริง)"	10 March 2025
11	"Proposal (ข้อเสนอ)"	17 March 2025
12	"Rivalry (การแข่งขัน)"	24 March 2025

== Original soundtrack ==
Ossan's Love: Original Soundtrack

Soundtrack album by Various Artists
- Genre: Soundtrack
- Label: Freshment
- Producer: GMMTV Records

No.	Title	Artist	Length
1.	"Stuckling"	Earth; Mix; Jennie Panhan	3:18
2.	"False Awakening"	Mix Sahaphap	4:13
3.	"Lucky Fan"	Earth Pirapat	3:30
4.	"You Are My Best"	Earth Pirapat; Mix Sahaphap	3:43
5.	"Say Yes"	Nanon Korapat	3:30
6.	"Until"	Earth Pirapat	3:29
