= A Tale of Thousand Stars =

2021 Thai television series

- Official series poster
- Also known as: 1000 Stars
- Thai: นิทานพันดาว
- Genre: Romance; Drama
- Based on: นิทานพันดาว by Bacteria
- Directed by: Noppharnach Chaiwimol
- Starring: Pirapat Watthanasetsiri; Sahaphap Wongratch
- Opening theme: "นิทานพันดาว" ("A Tale Of Thousand Stars") by Gun Napat
- Country of origin: Thailand
- Original language: Thai
- No. of episodes: 10

Production
- Running time: 65 minutes
- Production company: GMMTV

Original release
- Network: GMM 25; LINE TV
- Release: 29 January – 2 April 2021

Related
- Our Skyy 2

A Tale of Thousand Stars (Thai: นิทานพันดาว – 1000stars; RTGS: Ni-than Phan Dao – 1000stars) is a 2021 Thai television series starring Pirapat Watthanasetsiri (Earth) and Sahaphap Wongratch (Mix). The series follows Tian Sopasitsakun (Sahaphap Wongratch), who receives a heart transplant after volunteer teacher Torfun (Sarunchana Apisamaimongkol) dies in a tragic accident. By reading through Torfun's diary, Tian learns about her final wish, which is to count a thousand stars with Phupha Viriyanon (Pirapat Watthanasetsiri), a chief forest ranger. In time, Tian accepts Torfun's destiny as his own.

Directed by Noppharnach Chaiwimol and produced by GMMTV, it is one of the twelve television series GMMTV showcased for 2020 during their "New & Next" event on 15 October 2019. Originally scheduled as a 2020 release, the series premiered on GMM 25 and LINE TV on 29 January 2021, airing on Fridays at 20:30 ICT and 22:30 ICT, respectively. The series aired its final episode on 2 April 2021, it was replaced by Fish upon the Sky (wherein Sahaphap is a part of the cast.) on its timeslot on GMM25. The series had an rerun every Friday to Sunday from 3 September to 24 September 2021 at 8:30 pm on GMM25, replacing the reruns of 2gether: The Series and Still 2gether. The rerun of the series was then subsequently replaced by the rerun of its successor series, Fish upon the Sky on its timeslot.

It was featured on Teen Vogue's best BL dramas list in 2021, and gained widespread popularity among fans.

== Synopsis ==
After volunteer teacher, Torfun (Sarunchana Apisamaimongkol) dies in a tragic accident, her heart is transplanted to Tian (Sahaphap Wongratch). Through a series of diary entries, Tian learns about Torfun's life, secrets, interests, as well as her promise to count a thousand stars with Chief forest officer Phupha (Pirapat Watthanasetsiri). Tian, as the new volunteer teacher, attempts to befriend Phupha, but the latter is initially cold to him. As the two slowly grow closer, Tian's heart beats fast around the military officer, and he starts to fall for him, much like his heart's previous owner did. Treading on dangerous territory, can the two keep their thousand star promise?

== Cast and characters ==
=== Main ===
- Pirapat Watthanasetsiri (Earth) as Phupha Viriyanon, the chief forest officer
- Sahaphap Wongratch (Mix) as Tian Sopasitsakun, the volunteer teacher

=== Supporting ===
- Sarunchana Apisamaimongkol (Aye) as Torfun Chareonpon
- Nawat Phumphotingam (White) as Tul (Tian's friend)
- Krittanai Arsalprakit (Nammon) as Nam (The Doctor)
- Thanawat Rattanakitpaisan (Khaotung) as Longtae (Khama's son)
- Nattharat Kornkaew (Champ) as Yod (The Technician)
- Sattabut Laedeke (Drake) as Rang (The Ranger)
- Kamonlapat Dokmonta (Aum) as Ayi
- Woraphanmai Egami (Kinuko) as Meejoo
- Achirapol Jinapanyo (Achi) as Khaonueng
- Marinda Halpin as Inta
- Gimjeng Yanathip (Gim) as Kalae

=== Guest ===
- Jakkrit Ammarat (Ton) as Teerayut (Tian's father)
- Paweena Charivsakul (Jeab) as Lalita (Tian's mother)
- Witaya Jethapai (Thanom) as Bianglae Khama (The Village Chief)
- Thanongsak Suphakan (Nong) as Sakda
- Phatchara Tubthong (Kapook) as Jeab (Nam's wife)
- Juthapich Indrajundra (Jamie) as Lin

== Episodes ==
No.	Original release date
1	29 January 2021
Rich and carefree, Tian spends his days partying and gambling. One night while out with his friends, Tian experiences heart failure and is rushed to the hospital. That same night, a volunteer teacher, Torfun, is fatally hit by a speeding car, leaving her heart to be given to Tian. Following his heart surgery, Tian becomes curious about the person who has given him a new chance at life. He finds out that it was Torfun and retrieves the journal she had the night she died, filled with details from her life as a teacher in Pha Pun Dao Village. Wanting to fulfill her last wishes, Tian applies to become the new volunteer teacher at the same village. There, he meets Chief Phupha.
2	5 February 2021
After applying for a new volunteer teacher, Tian had to adapt himself to a new environment, which he had never experienced in his entire elite life. There's no electricity in his place (which is a hut on the mountain). He had to walk to work as there's no vehicle for him. There's no supplying water and he had to take a bath at the waterfall. He met Phupha (a Forest Chief Officer) who didn't really impress him on the first night of his stay. Tian also met Yod (the technician), Rang (the Forest Officer), Doctor Nam (the Village doctor) who all knew about the story of Torfun's accident and death. However, they didn't reveal the truth to Khama (the village headman) and other villagers about Torfun's death. Tian had tried very hard to get accepted by the kids who were his students and the villagers, who were still comparing him to Torfun while everyone always liked to mention about her. Tian wanted to impress the students, but it was his big mistake because one of his students got an accident. This caused Phupha and the villagers didn't like him even more.
3	12 February 2021
Tian wanted to give up to be a volunteer teacher and thought he should go back to live his life in the city. However, a flashback of how he got a second chance to live had popped up in his mind, plus Phupha had told him "not to be a teacher" to the kids, but a "big brother" to the kids. Tian realized that to get accepted by the kids and the villagers, he had to break the ice between him and the villagers. He joined the villagers' daily life activities and their careers, showing he was very eager to learn and be part of the community. He worked in the tea plantation to learned picking the tea leaves, worked in the chicken farm to feed the chicken and collect the eggs, in the elderly house to sew the clothes and so on. That made him slowly get closed to the villagers and the ice had been finally broken down. While things were running smoothly and he got accepted by the kids and villagers, he created another problem by fighting with a group of middle-man, who was connected to a powerful merchant (Sakda) in town. Luckily, Tian was not seriously injured because Phupha and his officers were able to protect him in time. The fight resulted in none of the tea products from the village were sold because other buyers were asked not to buy anything from the village. Since the fighting incident, Phupha had to spend more time bodyguarding Tian in order to protect him from those cheating buyers. At the end of the day, the villagers were realized that Tian had done a good job for all villagers' good sake. They held an official welcoming party and local ritual for Tian, which made Tian felt he got completely accepted and was part of the community. Tian became drunk after the party and Phupha walked him home. Phupha found a scar on Tian's chest and was curious about how he got the wound.
4	19 February 2021
Phupha brought the curiosity about the big scar on Tian's chest to inquire with Doctor Nam, but didn't get the exact and clear answer. Doctor Nam suggested Phupha ask Tian by himself. At the village, Tian educated the kids at school and to read the scale properly so that they will not be cheated anymore when selling the tea products. This was an eye-opener to the kids and the villagers. Phupha brought Tian to the city to buy some groceries. In the city, where Phupha left Tian to Doctor Nam as he had to go back to the village due to emergency call allowed Tian to have a chance to spend time with Dr. Nam. Tian asked Doctor Nam about Torfun and Phupha relationship, also Phupha and Doctor Nam relationship. Tian only got the answer that Doctor Nam has got a girlfriend. Even though he didn't get a clear answer about Torfun and Phupha relationship, he felt relieved when he knew that Phupha and Doctor Nam was only best friend. Longtae and Tian become closer because they joined village activities and this made Phupha started having a feeling so strange inside of him, the possessive feeling. He became grumpy quite easily when he saw Tian and Longtae together. Doctor Nam noticed this and asked Phupha to change himself to be nicer with Tian so that Tian could feel that change. Phupa took Tian to Pha Pan Dao as Tian's wish (Pha - Cliff, Pan Dao = Thousand Stars). On the cliff, Phupha admitted to Tian that the feeling of him for Torfun was just a sister. The reason Phupha became a Forest Officer was because he got inspired by his father who used to work at the same post. During the trip, Tian found a romantic side of Phupha, which made Tian felt really not sure about his feeling inside for him.
5	26 February 2021
Doctor Nam took Tian to the city. During their lunch in the city, Tian met the merchant group who had a fight with him at the village. He met Sakda in person. He also paid for their table but Tian did not impress with Sakda's treat and meeting at all. Tian later got a chance to call Tul (his best friend) to let him know how he was. Tul was very happy to get contacted and immediately flew to Chiang Mai to see Tian. Two old friends were happy to see each other. Tian asked Doctor Nam to go back to the village alone because Tian wanted to stay overnight with his friend. When Phupha realised that Tian was in the city, he was not in a good mood all day. At night time, Tian told Tul the reasons he wanted to stay in the village but at the end he confessed to Tul that he liked a guy who was body guarding him. Tul was not surprised, but instead became very supportive to Tian's feeling and relationship. Tul even encouraged to be more active towards Phupha, who Tul thought that Phupha didn't speak his mind. Back to the village, Phupha had a party with Doctor Nam and his colleagues. Doctor Nam insisted to Phupha again to be nice with Tian even more. The following day, Phupha picked Tian up in the city himself. He surprised Tian by taking him to the viewpoint and tried to be very nice with Tian. Tian could feel the kindness and saw a real smile from Phupha which made Tian felt really happy. One day in a class, Tian invited Phupha to teach the kids how to make a kite. The kids were so happy and went to the field right away to play with the kite. Tian became fainted and everyone was shocked. He was brought to the hospital right away.
6	5 March 2021
Doctor Nam found out the medication that Tian was taking was immunnosuppressive medication, which brought together with Tian by someone during his admission to the hospital. Tian had no choice but had to admit to Doctor Nam that his so-called "heart disease" actually was a heart transplant surgery. Tian asked Doctor Nam to keep the secret, especially Phupha because Tian was so afraid he could be sent back if everyone found out his health condition. After discharge from the hospital, Tian tried to find out who took his medication to Doctor Nam and later he found that it was Longtae. Longtae also found Torfun's diary and was very upset at the beginning because he didn't expect that Tian and Torfun would have known each other. Tian told Longtae the whole true story that Torfun had passed away and her heart was donated to him. Tian wanted to fulfill all of Torfun wishes in the diary and promised to Longtae that he would disclose the truth to everyone else later. Tian and Longtae became good friends again and tried to help and support the villagers selling their tea products. They come up with the idea of producing tea leave sachet and they got lots of orders from the shops. They convinced the villagers to help with the production despite getting an objection at the very beginning when the idea was proposed during the meeting. A mass production of tea sachet drew the attention and manpower of villagers to help to complete the order. Phupha became even more jealous every time he saw Tian and Longtae spending time together. This was to obvious to Doctor Nam who noticed that again and reminded Phupha that Longtae and Tian were are at the same age. This made both of them had many things in common and Phupha must understand that. Phupha volunteered himself to help ship the order of tea sachet to the shop. He met Sakda there and proudly said that even the tea leaves were rejected by all the buyers, they could still come up with another creative idea to help the sale. This made Sakda upset to hear that. While the order of the new products were placed increasingly, the storehouse of the tea sachet was burnt down. Tian tried to protect the products in the fire, but failed. He got rescued by Phupha.
7	12 March 2021
The episode starts with a flashback of Tian realising Torfun is the person he hit on the street race. Dr Nam wonders why Tian came to the village if he’s in such poor health so he stars digging and finds out Tian’s identity. He tries to confront him about it but he can’t. Chief Phupha investigates the fire and finds a fuel tin that proves it was arson. Tian blames himself but Phupha reassures him. Dr Nam asks Phupha how much they truly know about Tian but the Chief dismisses him. Tian and Longtae visit the remains of the school. Tian is helpless. He decides to leave the village to protect everyone but the Chief persuades him to come stay with him where he can protect him. They enjoy some moments of blissful domesticity where Phupha tries his best to constantly fluster Tian. The kids surprise Tian at the Rangers’ base. Chief Phupha is endeared by his teaching and the other rangers tease him for it. Tian cooks Phupha’s favorite food for the rangers and Dr Nam. Phupha and Dr Nam are once again spooked by Tian’s similarity to Torfun. The villagers get superstitious about all the bad things have been happening and think they have angered the spirits. Chief Phupha tries to get Mr Sakda’s men to turn to his side to catch him but finds out he’s fled. He and the other rangers go drinking. The Chief plays the Khlui for Tian. He tells Tian he reminds him of Torfun and asks Tian if he’s hiding something. Tian wants to confess but Phupha is too drunk and passes out. The villagers surprise Tian with the rebuilding of the school. Dr Nam finds out the whole truth. Tian thinks it’s time to confess.
8	19 March 2021
Chief Phupha finds Torfun’s diary in Tian’s house as Tian tells the village the truth. Everyone in the village is completely disappointed. Phupha tells him he never wants to see him again. Dr Nam tries to defend Tian to Phupha, who is heartbroken and filled with rage. Longtae is willing to talk to Tian. The rangers trace some weird activity close to Pha Pun Dao Cliff. Dr Nam finds out that Tian was not behind the wheel when Torfun was hit. Tian asks Longtae to take him to Pha Pun Dao Cliff so he can fulfil Torfun’s last wish. While Longtae is prepping for the trip, Tian follows some shady villagers to Ghost Hill to find they are helping Mr Sakda contraband goods through the border. They are seen and try to flee. Tian tells Longtae to take the phone to the village while he distracts the men and is captured. The rangers get there in time but Phupha is shot in Tian’s stead. Tian’s dad receives a call about his son’s location and gets moving.
9	26 March 2021
The episode starts with a flashback of Torfun and Phupha at Phu Pan Dao Cliff where he rejects her feelings. In the present, Phupha and Tian are taken to the hospital. Tian meets his father. Tian and Phupha talk about their feelings but everything goes wrong when Tian finds out he's been deceived by the Chief. After some very painful goodbyes, Tian accepts to leave in the New Year.
10	2 April 2021
Tian goes back to Bangkok, where he decides to pursue a career in education. He takes Phaphu's advice to follow his heart and live for himself. The two are reunited.

== Production ==
The production team at the beginning chose one of the hill-tribe villages in the northern part of Thailand to shoot the series, but later on, due to tradition and belief, the initially chosen locations were all removed from the plan because they were not allowed to shoot. As the local people were afraid that, with the numbers of shooting crew members and production could be against the local condition. The village, they first picked, has a tradition of spirit worship. The villagers were afraid that the shooting could disturb the spirit in the place. The production team then decided to build the entire village from scratch in different locations (Mainly in Chiang Rai), while the novel and series portraited the story in somewhere in Chiang Mai. The production team had to build Tian's House, Pha Pan Dao School, Khama's House, and villagers' houses from. The "Pra Pi Run" Unit, which was a workplace, commanding station and accommodation for Phupha and was renovated from an old and deserted wayside shelter.

== Soundtrack ==
Title	Romanized title	English title	Artist(s)	Note	Ref.
ให้นานกว่าที่เคย	Hai Narn Kwa Tee Koey	"Longer Than Ever"	KLEAR & Phai Pongsathorn	First Official Trailer	
นิทานพันดาว	Ni Taan Pun Dao	"A Tale of Thousand Stars"	Napat Injaiuea (Gun)	Official OST	
แก้มน้องนางนั้นแดงกว่าใคร	Gaem Nong Nang Nan Daeng Kwa Krai	"Your Cheek is Rosier Than Everyone Else"	Khian Kai Lae Wanich	EP3	
สายตาโกหกไม่เป็น	Sai Ta Go Hok Mai Pen	"Eyes Don't Lie"	Pirapat Watthanasetsiri (Earth)	Official OST	
นิทานพันดาว (ทอฝัน Version)	Ni Taan Pun Dao (Torfun Version)	"A Tale of Thousand Stars" (Torfun Version)	Sarunchana Apisamaimongkol (Aye)	Official OST	
นิทานพันดาว (ภูผา Version)	Ni Taan Pun Dao (Phupha Version)	"A Tale of Thousand Stars" (Phupha Version)	Pirapat Watthanasetsiri (Earth)	Official OST	
ลม	Lom	"Wind"	Num Kala	EP10	
นิทานพันดาว (เธียร Version)	Ni Taan Pun Dao (Tian Version)	"A Tale of Thousand Stars" (Tian Version)	Sahaphap Wongratch (Mix)	Official OST	

== Awards and nominations ==
Year	Award	Category	Result	Ref.
2021	Content Asia Awards	Best LGBTQ+ Programme Made in Asia	Won	
2021	HUB Awards 2021	Opening of the Year	Won	

== Future ==
In 2022, GMMTV announced that A Tale Of Thousand Stars will be included in the roster for the second part of their series, Our Skyy (entitled Our Skyy 2). Earth and Mix are expected to reprise their roles as Phupha and Tian respectively.
