= Noppanut Guntachai =

Thai actor and singer (born 1995)

- นพณัฐ กันทะชัย
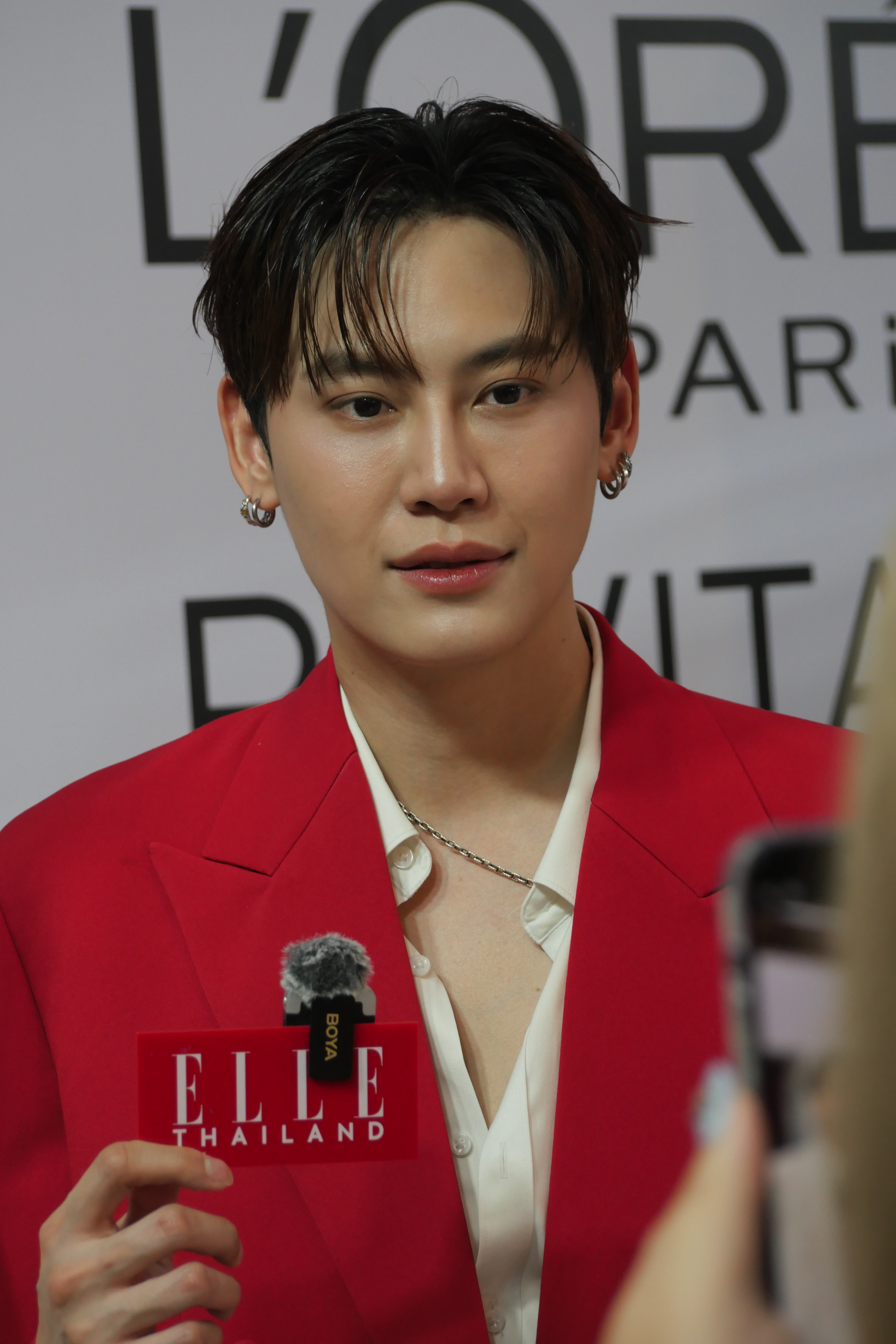
- Noppanut in May 2025
- Born: Noppanut Guntachai; 10 July 1995 (age 31); Bangkok, Thailand
- Other name: Boun
- Occupations: Actor; singer
- Years active: 2016–present
- Agents: Studio Wabi Sabi (2019–2024); GMMTV (2024–present)
- Known for: Win in Until We Meet Again and Between Us; Ramil in Revamp The Undead Story
- Musical career
- Genre: Pop
- Instrument: Vocal

Noppanut Guntachai (Thai: นพณัฐ กันทะชัย; born 10 July 1995), nicknamed Boun (Thai: บุ๋น), is a Thai actor and singer under GMMTV. He is best known for his roles "Win" in the television series Until We Meet Again (2019) and its spin-off Between Us (2022).

== Early life and education ==
Noppanut was born in Thailand. He attended St. Dominic High School and later pursued a degree in Communication Arts at Bangkok University. He has stated that actor Captain Chonlathorn Kongyingyong was his inspiration for entering the entertainment industry.

== Career ==
Noppanut began his acting career in 2017 with a guest role in the series 2Moons: The Series. In 2019, he gained significant recognition for his portrayal of Win in the series Until We Meet Again, a role he reprised as a lead in 2022 spin-off Between Us. His other television work includes roles in Art of the Devil Series (2020), You Never Eat Alone (2020), 7 Project (2021), and Even Sun (2022).

In April 2024, his contract with Studio Wabi Sabi concluded, and he subsequently signed with GMMTV. In 2025 he portrayed Ramil, the last heir of a vampire family who was sealed in an old painting for over a hundred years, in the series Revamp The Undead Story.

== Filmography ==
Key
†	Denotes television productions that have not yet been released

Year	Title	Role	Notes	Ref.
2016	Dream Team the series	Win	Supporting role	
2017	2Moons	Star&Moon contestant	Guest role	
2018	Be My Boy	Bond	Supporting role	
2019	Reminders	Student	Guest role	
2019	Until We Meet Again	Win	Supporting role	
2020	Art of the Devil Series	Kin	Main role	
2020	You Never Eat Alone	Boun	Guest role	
2021	7 Songs 7 Project , Once Upon A Time	Mek	Main role	
2021	You Light Up My Life Again	Dede	Supporting role	
2022	Cutie Pie	Top	Guest role	
2022	Be my boyfriends 2 : Rose in da house	Boun	Main role	
2022	Even Sun	Arthit	Main role	
2022	Between Us	Win	Main role	
2023	Marry's Mission	Grey	Main role	
2025	Revamp The Undead Story	Ramil Soleil Jonoel	Main role	
2025	Zomvivor	Korn	Main role	
2025	Friendshit Forever	Namo	Main role	
2025	Melody of Secrets	Muenmile	Supporting role	
TBA	Plan B to U †	Krit	Main role	
TBA	A Season to Remember †	"Chat" Chatphirun	Main role	

== Discography ==
=== Original Soundtrack ===
Year	Title	Notes	Label	Ref.
2020	โชคดีแค่ไหน (Chok Dee Khae Nhai)	Ost. Until we meet again	Studio Wabi Sabi	
2020	หรือเราเคยพบกัน (Reu Rao Koey Pob Gun)	Ost. Until we meet again	Studio Wabi Sabi	
2021	เพิ่งเข้าใจ (I'm Sorry)	ost. 7songs7project	Studio Wabi Sabi	
2023	Your smile (ยอมแพ้)	Ost. Between Us	Studio Wabi Sabi	
2023	บีบมือ (Beep Mue)	Ost. Between Us With Warut Chawalitrujiwong	Studio Wabi Sabi	
2025	ลิขิต (Under the Moonlight)	Ost. Revamp The Undead StoryWith Warut Chawalitrujiwong	GMMTV Records	
2025	ค่ำคืนที่รอแสงสว่าง (Midnight Light)	Ost. Revamp The Undead Story	GMMTV Records	

=== Singles ===
Year	Title	Notes	Label	Ref.
2020	ขอเวลาลืม (The Remake)	JOOX The Remake With Warut Chawalitrujiwong		
2021	ต่างคนต่างรัก (Tang Kon Tang Rak)	Call Me By Your Song EP	Tero Music	
2021	ถ่าอ้ายมาเฮ็ด (Tha Aye Ma Hed)	FreeFire4FEST With Warut Chawalitrujiwong , กระแต อาร์สยาม,	RS	
2022	Chocolate	BE MY BOYFRIENDS 2	The dream and destiny	
2022	In my room	BE MY BOYFRIENDS 2	The dream and destiny	
2022	IWBYBF	BE MY BOYFRIENDS 2	The dream and destiny	
2023	ยิ้มได้เพราะเธอ (Smile)	Prem birthday project		
2024	Dusk till dawn	With Warut Chawalitrujiwong		
2024	กว่าจะรักกันเท่านี้ (Hold my hand)	With Warut Chawalitrujiwong	GMMTV Records	

== Concert ==
Year	Name	Date	Region	Location	Ref.
2022	Be my boyfriend 2 Concert	2 July	THAILAND	Union Hall, Union Mall	
2024	BOUNCY BOUN CONCERT	13 July	THAILAND	Thunder Dome	
2024	GMMTV MUSICON IN CAMBODIA	5 October	CAMBODIA	NABA Theatre, NagaWorld2, CAMBODIA	
2024	GMMTV Fan Fest 2024 in Macau	8 December	MACAU	Galaxy arena Macau	
2025	LOVE OUT LOUD FAN FEST 2025 : LOVEMOSPHERE	17-18 May	THAILAND	Impact Arena	
2026	GMMTV Fan Fest 2026 in Japan	21 February	JAPAN	Tokyo Garden Theater,Tokyo	
2026	LOVE OUT LOUD FAN FEST 2026 : HEART RACE	22-24 May	THAILAND	Impact Arena	
2026	FEEL FAN FUN PARTY CONCERT	25 July	THAILAND	Union Hall, Union Mall	
2026	GMMTV Fan Fest 2026 in MACAU	8 August	MACAU	THE VENETIAN ARENA (COTAI EXPO HALL)	

=== Fan meeting ===
Year	Name	Date	Region	Location	Ref.
2020	Until We Meet Again Fan Meeting in Myanmar	7 March	MYANMAR	Sky Star Hotel Royal Ballroom, MYANMAR	
2020	Until We Meet Again : Until You Fan Meeting	25 October	THAILAND	Union Hall, Union Mall	
2021	Virtual Live Fan Meeting BOUNPREM is Real ขอ 1 วันมาอยู่ด้วยกันนะ	25 March	THAILAND	Live streaming	
2021	Fandom X-clusive Live: Boun Prem Stuck on the Island!	28 November	THAILAND	Live Streaming on Zoom Meetings and VooV Meeting	
2022	7 Project Hello Goodbye Fan meeting 2022	3 April	THAILAND	SF World cinema Centralworld Mastercard Cinema	
2022	BORN TO B : 1st FAN MEETING BOUN NOPPANUT	9 July	THAILAND	K-Bank Siam Theaters	
2022	FOOD TRUCK BATTLE Season 2 Fan Meeting “Recipe of The Journey”	10 September	THAILAND	Royal Paragon Hall	
2022	BounPrem 1st Fanmeeting in Korea "SINCE I MET YOU	16 October	SOUTH of KOREA	SEOUL,SOUTH of KOREA	
2022	BounPrem 1st Fanmeeting Vietnam	29 October	VIETNAM	Mai House Saigon, HOJIMN	
2023	BETWEEN US FAN MEETING IN THE THEATRE	5 March	THAILAND	MeangThai Ratchadalai Theater	
2023	Between Us : Close to you in Vietnam	25 March	VIETNAM	Hoa Binh Theater, VIETNAM	
2023	Between Us Fanmeeting in Seoul	22 April	SOUTH of KOREA	SEOUL,SOUTH of KOREA	
2023	Between us Fan Meeting In Taipei 2023	13 May	TAIWAN	NTU Sports Center, TAIPEI	
2023	Between Us Fan Meeting In Tokyo	21 May	JAPAN	EX THEATER ROPPONGI, TOKYO	
2023	Between Me & You: Between Us The Series Fanmeeting in Manila 2023	28 May	PHILIPPINES	SM Sky dom, MANILA	
2023	"Between US”— Close to you Fan Meeting	18 June	MACAU	Macau Station	
2023	BETWEEN US The Series Fan Meeting in Hong Kong	1 July	HONG KONG	ROTUNDA 3, KITEC HONG KONG	
2023	BOUN BIRTHDAY PARTY with PREM IN JAPAN	8 July	JAPAN	COOL JAPAN PARK OSAKA WWHALL, OSAKA	
2023	BOUN BIRTHDAY PARTY WITH PREM IN JAPAN	9 July	JAPAN	TOKYO DOME CITY HALL, TOKYO	
2023	Between Us the series Fan Meeting in Kaohsiung	17 September	CHINA	BackStage Live, Kaohsiung	
2023	WABI LOVE LATIN TOUR 2023	30 September	BRAZIL	HORARIO DOS EVENTOS, SAOPAOLO	
2023	WABI LOVE LATIN TOUR 2023	1 October	BRAZIL	Teatro Dercy Gonçalves, RIO DEJANIRO	
2023	WABI LOVE LATIN TOUR 2023	4 October	BRAZIL	RioMar Kennedy, FORTALEZA	
2023	WABI LOVE LATIN TOUR 2023	6 October	CHILE	Club Subterraneo, SANTIAGO	
2023	Love Vibes 1st Fan Meeting with Boun and Prem in Bali	9 December	INDONESIA	The Crystal Luxury Bay Resort Nusa Dua, Bali INDONESIA	
2024	Between Us the series Fan meeting in Singapore	13 January	SINGAPORE	Capital theatre, SINGAPORE	
2024	BLOOM ’n’ BIRTH -PREM SPRING BIRTHDAY WITH BOUN IN JAPAN FANCONCERT	1 March	JAPAN	OSAKA	
2024	BLOOM ’n’ BIRTH -PREM SPRING BIRTHDAY WITH BOUN IN JAPAN FANCONCERT	2 March	JAPAN	SAITAMA	
2024	WONDERFUL DAY in MACAU	28 April	MACAU	Broadway Theatre, MACAU	
2024	Between Us Farewell in Hong Kong	31 May	HONG KONG	Macpherson Stadium, HONGKONG	
2024	Boun The Moment You Are Here	21 September	CHINA	Shanghai, CHINA	
2024	Thai Actors Fest	29 September	JAPAN	Toyosu PIT, JAPAN	
2024	Fanday in Bangkok 2024	1 December	THAILAND	Union Hall, Union Mall	
2025	4th JIB DREAM FANMEET : JIB BL Festival	12 January	ITALY	Hilton Rome airport Hotel, ROME	
2025	GMMTV FANDAY 18th in Tokyo	1 March	JAPAN	BELLESALLE SHIODOME, B1F HALL, TOKYO	
2025	Boun 1st Fan Party in Guangzhou	9 March	CHINA	Guangzhou, CHINA	
2025	GMMTV FANDAY 19th in Cambodia	29 March	CAMBODIA	AEON MALL SEN SOK CITY ,CAMBODIA	
2025	GMMTV FANDAY 20th in Taipei	19 April	TAIWAN	WESTAR, TAIPEI	
2025	MIDNIGHT REVERIE : BOUNPREM FANMEETING IN MACAU	8 June	MACAU	Broadway Macau – Broadway Theatre, MACAU	
2025	Boun Fan Party	5 July	CHINA	Chongqing, CHINA	
2025	Revamp The Undead Story Final EP. Fan Meeting	25 October	THAILAND	Siam Pavalai Royal Grand Theater	
2025	Boun Prem 1st Fan Meeting in Berlin	9 November	GERMANY	Estrel Berlin	
2026	Boun Prem Fan Meeting Live in Singapore	17 January	SINGAPORE	Foo Chow Hall, SINGAPORE	
2026	GMMTV FANDAY 30th in Tokyo	22 March	JAPAN	Venue Nissho Hall, Tokyo	
2026	BOUN PREM FAN MEETING IN HONGKONG 2026	4 April	HONGKONG	AXA DREAMLAND, GO PARK	
2026	BOUN NOPPANUT FAN MEETING IN CHONGQING	11 July	CHINA	CHONGQING, CHINA	
2026	BOUNPREM 1 FAN MEETING IN BRAZIL	30 August	BRAZIL	TAETRO APCD, SAO PAULO	
2026	GMMTV FANDAY 30th in PARIS	4 October	FRANCE	NOVOTEL PARIS EST CENTRE DE CONFERENCE	

=== Fansign ===
Year	Name	Date	Region	Location	Ref.
2025	Boun 1st Fan Sign in Changsha	15 November	CHINA	Changsha, China	
2026	2026 Boun Fansign in Shanghai	25 January	CHINA	Shanghai, China	
2026	The official Photobook of BOUNPREM : Aeternitas Fan Sign	6 February	THAILAND	GMM GRAMMY PLACE Building 21st Floor	
2026	BOUN FAN SIGN IN HANGZHOU	7 March	CHINA	HANGZHOU	
2026	FAN SIGN EVENT	20 June	TAIWAN	INCUBASE ARENA TAIPEI	

== Sport Days ==
Year	Name	Date	Region	Location	Ref.
2024	GMMTV Starlympics 2024	21 December	THAILAND	Impact Arena	
2025	GMMTV Starlympics 2025	20 December	THAILAND	Impact Arena	

== Awards ==
Year	Award	Category	Result	Ref.
2021	รางวัลเชิดชูเกียรติเยาวชนต้นแบบ Thailand Master Youth 2020-2021	Actor	Won	
2024	2024 Thailand Headlines Person of the Year Culture & Entertainment Award	Culture and Entertainment	Won	
