= Top Secret Together =

2021 Thai television series

- Thai: ได้ครับพี่ดีครับน้อง
- Literally: Top Secret Together
- Genre: Romantic drama; Boys' love
- Written by: Thanika Inchan
- Directed by: Peerapon Matheang
- Starring: Kanokpol Moonhong; Chayut Amatayakun; Sutiwas Wongsamran; Wannarat Wattadalimma; Natthakorn Seneewong Na Ayuthaya; Bhudis Planuson; Kitiwhut Sawutdimilin; Nattapong Chinsoponsap
- Country of origin: Thailand
- Original language: Thai
- No. of episodes: 15

Production
- Running time: 40 minutes
- Production company: Star Bangkok

Original release
- Network: LINE TV
- Release: 14 May – 20 August 2021

Top Secret Together (Thai: ได้ครับพี่ดีครับน้อง) is a 2021 Thai television series in the romantic drama and boys' love (BL) genres, directed by Peerapon Matheang and produced by Star Bangkok. The series aired from 14 May to 20 August 2021, with weekly episodes on Fridays on LINE TV. It was later also made available on GagaOOLala and WeTV.

== Synopsis ==
The series follows five couples facing different challenges. Simai (Kanok Kanokpol) is an outgoing intern who has to deal with Lukmo (Mix Chayut), an antisocial employee. Phob (Aof Sutiwas) is secretly in love with his best friend MaiEak (Sunny Wannarat). Newyear (Newyear Kitiwhut) and Both (Both Nattapong) are a real-life couple playing themselves. Nampu (Pooh Bhudis) is a persistent freshman trying to win over Copy (Fiat Natthakorn).

== Cast and characters ==
=== Main ===
- Kanokpol Moonhong (Kanok) as Simai
- Chayut Amatayakun (Mix) as Lukmo
- Sutiwas Wongsamran (Aof) as Phob
- Wannarat Wattadalimma (Sunny) as MaiEak
- Natthakorn Seneewong Na Ayuthaya (Fiat) as Copy
- Bhudis Planuson (Pooh) as Nampu
- Kitiwhut Sawutdimilin (Newyear) as Newyear
- Nattapong Chinsoponsap (Both) as Both

=== Supporting ===
- Tanawat Hudchaleelaha (Tiger) as Suea
- Ronapum Pengsaengthong (Tarw) as Plawaan
- Thanawee Phongphasawat (Link) as Night
- Natdanai Kajonklin (Pun) as Namo
- Sujitra Hemhiran (Nan) as Maysa
- Thanatchaphan Buranachiwawilai (Bookko) as Angie
- Nuanthong Naksilp as Simai's mother

== Production ==
Star Bangkok held an open audition process, with over 1,000 applicants narrowed down to 200 for the final selection. The cast was revealed in May 2021.

== Release and reception ==
The series premiered on 14 May 2021 on LINE TV. After the first episode, the series generated over 13 million interactions on the Chinese platform Weibo. After the second episode, that number rose to 20 million.

The series is also available on GagaOOLala and WeTV.
