= Warut Chawalitrujiwong =

Thai actor, model and singer (born 1998)

- วรุศ ชวลิตรุจิวงษ์
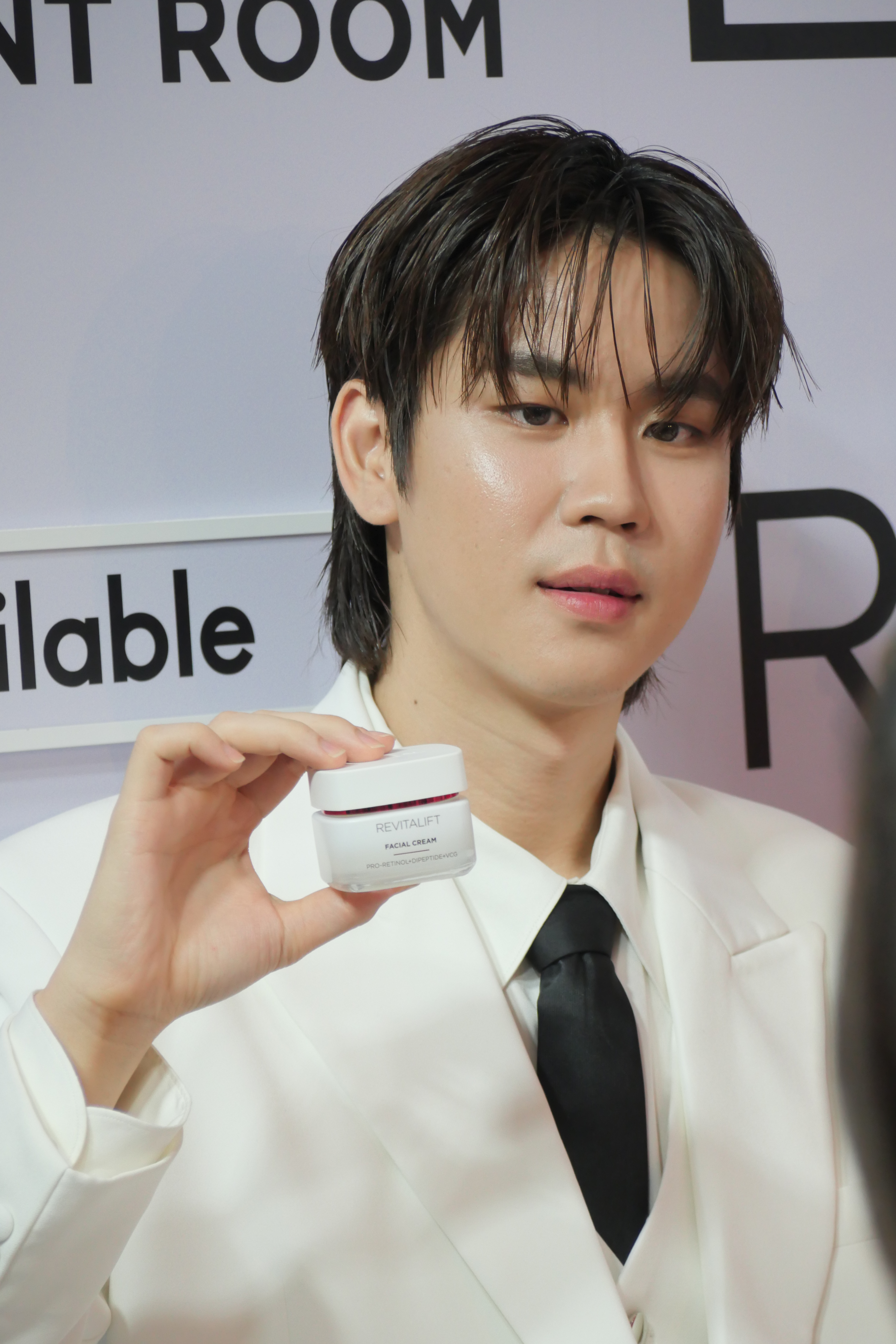
- Warut in May 2025
- Born: 8 March 1998 (age 28); Ubon Ratchathani, Thailand
- Other name: Prem
- Occupation: Actor
- Years active: 2017–present
- Agents: Studio Wabi Sabi (2017–2024); GMMTV (2024–present)
- Known for: Team in Until We Meet Again; Punn in Revamp The Undead Story
- Musical career
- Genre: Pop

Warut Chawalitrujiwong (Thai: วรุศ ชวลิตรุจิวงษ์; born 8 March 1998), nicknamed Prem (Thai: เปรม), is a Thai actor, singer under GMMTV. Prior to joining GMMTV, he was an actor under STARLATIZ until his contract expired. He is best known for his roles in Until We Meet Again (2019) and Between Us (2022).

== Early life and education ==
Warut was born in Ubon Ratchathani, Thailand. He attended Benjamamaharaj School for high school and graduated from the Faculty of Economics at Kasetsart University. Prem initially intended to become a professional golfer was ranked number one in the regional TGA youth competition for players under 18.

== Career ==
Warut debuted in the entertainment industry in 2017 in Da'vance young men's contest. He gained significant recognition for his role as Team in the 2019 Thai television series Until We Meet Again. His on-screen partnership with actor Boun in the series led to a fan following for their pairing.

He has also been featured in other television series, including Long Khong (2020), and played the role of Champ in the horror series The Box: The Haunted Hidden Box. He also re-recorded the song "Rak Rak Rak" for the project "Call Me By Your Song".

Following the success of Until We Meet Again, he and his co-star Boun starred as main leads in spin-off series Between Us. Prem sang the song It's Always You (Kon Kon Nan) for the series soundtrack. They also starred as main lead in Even Sun and played the character "Balloon" in the segment "Once Upon a Time" of the series 7 Project with Boun.

In November 2022, his contract with STARLATIZ expired and he did not renew it.

In April 2024, he was hired by production and talent agency GMMTV along with his friends Boun, Pongsapak Udompoch (Santa), and Samantha Melanie Coates (Sammy).

He held his first solo fan event, "PREM PRIVATE SPACE IN BANGKOK," in April 2024 to celebrate his 26th birthday. During the event, he performed several songs, showcasing his musical talents by playing the guitar and drums.

In 2025, he stars as the main character, Punn in Revamp The Undead Story alongside Boun. His character is an antique shop owner who accidentally revives a vampire with his blood. Prem also performed the theme song for the series, "ลิขิต" (Destiny), with Boun.

Prem has been a frequent guest on the variety show "Koo Mun FUNDAY" with Boun, where their close chemistry was highlighted.

== Filmography ==
=== Television series ===
Key
†	Denotes television productions that have not yet been released

Year	Title	Role	Notes	Ref.
2019	Until We Meet Again	Team	Supporting role	
2020	Long Khong	Nat	Supporting role	
2020	You Never Eat Alone	Prem	Guest role	
2021	The Yearbook	Puen	Guest role	
2021	7 Project	Balloon	Main role	
2022	Cutie Pie	Win's friend	Cameo	
2022	Even Sun	Sun	Main role	
2022	My Only 12%	Long Pao	Supporting role	
2022	Between Us	Team	Main role	
2023	The Box: The Haunted Hidden Box	Champ	Main role	
2025	Revamp The Undead Story	Punn	Main role	
2025	MuTeLuv: Not My Father	Phupar	Main role	
TBA	A Season to Remember †	Sutkhanueng	Main role	
TBA	High & Low: Born to Be High †	Jod	TBA	

== Discography ==
=== Soundtrack appearances ===
Year	Title	Artist	Ref.
2020	"ขอเวลาลืม" (The Remake)	Prem and Boun	
2021	"กว่าจะรักเท่านี้" (Hold My Hand)	Prem and Boun	
2021	"รัก รัก รัก" (Rak Rak Rak)	Call Me By Your Song Project	
2022	"คนคนนั้น" (It's Always You)	(OST Between Us)	
2025	"ลิขิต" (Destiny)	Prem and Boun (OST Revamp The Undead Story)	

=== Singles ===
Year	Title	Notes	Label	Ref.
2020	ขอเวลาลืม (The Remake)	JOOX The Remake With		
2021	"รัก รัก รัก" (Rak Rak Rak)	Call Me By Your Song EP	Tero Music	
2021	ถ่าอ้ายมาเฮ็ด (Tha Aye Ma Hed)	FreeFire4FEST With, กระแต อาร์สยาม,	RS	
2023		Prem birthday project		
2024	Dusk till dawn	With Noppanut Guntachai		
2024	กว่าจะรักกันเท่านี้ (Hold my hand)	With Noppanut Guntachai	GMMTV RECCORD	

== Concert ==
Year	Name	Date	Region	Location	etcf
2024	PREM PRIVATE SPACE IN BANGKOK	6 April	THAILAND	JJ HALL, JJ Mall	
2024	BOUNCY BOUN CONCERT	13 July	THAILAND	Thunder Dome	Guest
2024	GMMTV Fan Fest 2024 in Macau	8 December	MACAU	Galaxy arena Macau	
2025	LOVE OUT LOUD FAN FEST 2025 : LOVEMOSPHERE	17-18 May	THAILAND	Impact Arena	
2026	GMMTV Fan Fest 2026 Japan	21 February	JAPAN	Tokyo Garden Theater, Tokyo	
2026	JUNIORMARK SUNNY MOON CONCERT	9 August	THAILAND	Bitec Live	Guest

=== Fan meeting ===
Year	Name	Date	Region	Location	etc.
2020	Until We Meet Again Fan Meeting in Myanmar	7 March	MYANMAR	Sky Star Hotel Royal Ballroom, MYANMAR	
2020	Until We Meet Again : Until You Fan Meeting	25 October	THAILAND	Union Hall, Union Mall	
2020	M34N ON THE FLOOR	13 December	THAILAND	K-Bank Siam Theaters	Guest
2021	Virtual Live Fan Meeting BOUNPREM is Real ขอ 1 วันมาอยู่ด้วยกันนะ	25 March	THAILAND	Live streaming	
2021	Fandom X-clusive Live: Boun Prem Stuck on the Island!	28 November	THAILAND	Live Streaming on Zoom Meetings and VooV Meeting	
2022	7 Project Hello Goodbye Fan meeting 2022	3 April	THAILAND	SF World cinema Centralworld Mastercard Cinema	
2022	BORN TO B : 1st FAN MEETING BOUN NOPPANUT	9 July	THAILAND	K-Bank Siam Theaters	Guest
2022	FOOD TRUCK BATTLE Season 2 Fan Meeting “Recipe of The Journey”	10 September	THAILAND	Royal Paragon Hall	
2022	BounPrem 1st Fanmeeting in Korea "SINCE I MET YOU	16 October	SOUTH of KOREA	SEOUL, SOUTH of KOREA	
2022	BounPrem 1st Fanmeeting Vietnam	29 October	VIETNAM	Mai House Saigon, HOJIMN	
2023	BETWEEN US FAN MEETING IN THE THEATRE	5 March	THAILAND	MeangThai Ratchadalai Theater	
2023	Between Us : Close to you in Vietnam	25 March	VIETNAM	Hoa Binh Theater, VIETNAM	
2023	Between Us Fanmeeting in Seoul	22 April	SOUTH of KOREA	SEOUL, SOUTH of KOREA	
2023	Between us Fan Meeting In Taipei 2023	13 May	TAIWAN	NTU Sports Center, TAIPEI	
2023	Between Us Fan Meeting In Tokyo	21 May	JAPAN	EX THEATER ROPPONGI, TOKYO	
2023	Between Me & You: Between Us The Series Fanmeeting in Manila 2023	28 May	PHILIPPINES	SM Sky dom, MANILA	
2023	"Between US”— Close to you Fan Meeting	18 June	MACAU	Macau Station	
2023	BETWEEN US The Series Fan Meeting in Hong Kong	1 July	HONG KONG	ROTUNDA 3, KITEC HONG KONG	
2023	BOUN BIRTHDAY PARTY with PREM IN JAPAN	8 July	JAPAN	COOL JAPAN PARK OSAKA WWHALL, OSAKA	
2023	BOUN BIRTHDAY PARTY WITH PREM IN JAPAN	9 July	JAPAN	TOKYO DOME CITY HALL, TOKYO	
2023	"Want to See You" Summer Fan Meeting	20 August	CHINA	Qingdao Phoenix Voice Grand Theatre	
2023	Between Us the series Fan Meeting in Kaohsiung	17 September	CHINA	BackStage Live, Kaohsiung	
2023	Prem 1st Fancon in China	11 November	MACAU	H853 Entertainment Hall, Grand Lisboa, Macau	
2023	Love Vibes 1st Fan Meeting with Boun and Prem in Bali	9 December	INDONESIA	The Crystal Luxury Bay Resort Nusa Dua, Bali INDONESIA	
2024	Between Us the series Fan meeting in Singapore	13 January	SINGAPORE	Capital theatre, SINGAPORE	
2024	BLOOM ’n’ BIRTH -PREM SPRING BIRTHDAY WITH BOUN IN JAPAN FANCONCERT	1 March	JAPAN	OSAKA	
2024	BLOOM ’n’ BIRTH -PREM SPRING BIRTHDAY WITH BOUN IN JAPAN FANCONCERT	2 March	JAPAN	SAITAMA	
2024	WONDERFUL DAY in MACAU	28 April	MACAU	Broadway Theatre, MACAU	
2024	Between Us Farewell in Hong Kong	31 May	HONG KONG	Macpherson Stadium, HONGKONG	
2024	Thai Actors Fest	29 September	JAPAN	Toyosu PIT, JAPAN	
2024	GMMTV Fanday in Bangkok 2024	1 December	THAILAND	Union Hall, Union Mall	
2024	Prem Winter Dating in Qingdao	22 December	CHINA	Qingdao SCO Pearl International Expo Center, Hall G, Cultural and Leisure Center, Hall 7	
2025	4th JIB DREAM FANMEET : JIB BL Festival	12 January	ITALY	Hilton Rome airport Hotel, ROME	
2025	GMMTV FANDAY 18th in Tokyo	1 March	JAPAN	BELLESALLE SHIODOME, B1F HALL, TOKYO	
2025	Prem 1st Fan Party in Guangzhou	8 March	CHINA	Guangzhou, CHINA	
2025	GMMTV FANDAY 19th in Cambodia	29 March	CAMBODIA	AEON MALL SEN SOK CITY, CAMBODIA	
2025	GMMTV FANDAY 20th in Taipei	19 April	TAIWAN	WESTAR, TAIPEI	
2025	MIDNIGHT REVERIE : BOUNPREM FANMEETING IN MACAU	8 June	MACAU	Broadway Macau – Broadway Theatre, MACAU	
2025	Revamp The Undead Story Final EP. Fan Meeting	25 October	THAILAND	Siam Pavalai Royal Grand Theater	
2025	Boun Prem 1st Fan Meeting in Berlin	9 November	GERMANY	Estrel Berlin	
2026	Boun Prem Fan Meeting Live in Singapore	17 January	SINGAPORE	Foo Chow Hall, SINGAPORE	
2026	GMMTV FANDAY 30th in Tokyo	22 March	JAPAN	Venue Nissho Hall, Tokyo	

=== Fansign ===
Year	Name	Date	Region	Location	Ref.
2025	Prem 1st Fan Sign in Shanghai	26 June	CHINA	Shanghai, China	
2025	Prem 1st Fan Sign in Changsha	16 November	CHINA	Changsha, China	
2026	2026 Prem Fansign in Shanghai	24 January	CHINA	HANGZHOU	
2026	The official Photobook of BOUNPREM : Aeternitas Fan Sign	6 February	THAILAND	GMM GRAMMY PLACE Building 21st Floor	
2026	PREM 2026 FANSIGN IN HANGZHOU	8 March	CHINA	HANGZHOU, China	

== Sport Days ==
Year	Name	Date	Region	Location	Ref.
2020	Kazz Sport Day All Stars 2020	7 November	THAILAND	MCC Hall The Mall Lifestore Ngamwongwan	
2024	GMMTV Starlympics 2024	21 December	THAILAND	Impact Arena	
2025	GMMTV Starlympics 2025	20 December	THAILAND	Impact Arena	

== Awards ==
- 2021 KAZZ Awards: "Num Cool Do Dee" with Boun Noppanut Guntachai
- 2021 Model Youth Awards: "Rising Actor" with Boun Noppanut Guntachai
