= Thanatsaran Samthonglai =

Thai actor (born 2000)

- ธนัตถ์ศรันย์ ซำทองไหล
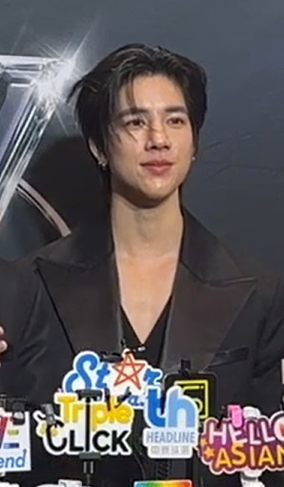
- Frank in 2026
- Born: 12 July 2000 (age 26); Loei, Thailand
- Other name: Frank
- Education: Panjavidhya Technological College
- Occupation: Actor
- Years active: 2018–present
- Known for: Tee in 'Cause You're My Boy; Bantad in Blacklist; Phukong in 2gether: The Series
- Height: 5 ft 11.7 in (1.82 m)
- Parents: Aittiphon Samthonglai (father); Nukhid Samthonglai (mother)

Thanatsaran Samthonglai (Thai: ธนัตถ์ศรันย์ ซำทองไหล; born 12 July 2000), nicknamed Frank (Thai: แฟรงค์), is a Thai actor. He is known for his main role as Tee in 'Cause You're My Boy (2018), Bantad in Blacklist (2019), and Phukong in 2gether: The Series (2020).

== Early life and education ==
Thanatsaran was born in Loei Province, Thailand. He is currently taking up a vocational course on automotive at Panjavidhya Technological College.

== Career ==
In 2021, he left GMMTV after being required to serve in the military.

== Personal life ==
He owns a cat and eight dogs, five of which are shih tzu and rest are a pomeranian, a thai ridgeback and a bangkaew. He also likes to play football.

== Filmography ==
=== Television ===
Year	Title	Role	Notes	Ref.
2018	'Cause You're My Boy	Tee	Main role	
2018	Our Skyy	Tee	Main role	
2019	Blacklist	Bantad	Main role	
2020	2gether: The Series	Phukong	Support role	
2020	Still 2gether	Phukong	Support role	
2022	Nha Harn	Tlemai	Main role	
2023	Love Syndrome III	Itt	Main role	
2023	Crazy Handsome Rich	Luv Thaitalad	Main role	
2023	Y Journey: Stay Like a Local	Namo	Main role	
2024	OMG! Vampire	Phum	Main role	
2024	The Rebound	Atom	Support role	
2024	Red Peafowl	Yu Mou Yi	Support role	
2026	Neptune in the Sky	Kyo	Main role	

=== Film ===
Year	Title	Role	Notes	Ref.
2021	2gether: The Movie	Phukong	Support role	
2024	Death Whisperer 2	Nawin	Support role	
