= Friend.ship with Krist-Singto =

2019 Thai web series

- Genre: Adventure; Travel; Food; Comedy
- Created by: GMMTV
- Presented by: Perawat Sangpotirat; Prachaya Ruangroj
- Opening theme: "Let's Move" by Palitchoke Ayanaputra
- Country of origin: Thailand
- Original language: Thai
- No. of episodes: 6

Production
- Production locations: Thailand; South Korea
- Running time: 25 - 30 minutes
- Production company: GMMTV

Original release
- Network: YouTube; LINE TV
- Release: 15 July – 15 December 2019

Friend.ship with Krist-Singto is a Thai web series of GMMTV hosted by Perawat Sangpotirat (Krist) and Prachaya Ruangroj (Singto), both lead actors of SOTUS (2016) and SOTUS S (2017), currently available for streaming on YouTube and LINE TV.

Each episode features different places where Krist and Singto travel and try different activities. The series premiered on 15 July 2019 and aired every 15th day of the month. It aired its last episode on 15 December 2019.

== Episodes ==
No.	Title	Original release date	Ref.
1	"Missing the Old Days in "Pattaya""	15 July 2019	
Krist and Singto are reminiscing their old days in Pattaya as they try for the first time parachuting and riding on a banana boat and cook a seafood dinner.
2	"ฉันมาทำอะไร ที่ 'เขาใหญ่' (lit. transl. What am I doing at Khao Yai?)"	15 August 2019	
Krist and Singto go to Thong Somboon Club Resort in Khao Yai where they enjoy horseback riding in cowboy costumes and some adventure rides then finishing it off with a BBQ dinner.
3	"'อัมพวา' มันเกินไปจริงๆ (lit. transl. 'Amphawa' is really too much.)"	15 September 2019	
Krist and Singto go to Amphawa where they arrange a buffet of 60 kilograms of corn for the monkeys and do water skiing along the Mae Klong river.
4	"Busan มันดีจริงๆ นะ (lit. transl. Busan, it's really good.)"	15 October 2019	
First trip of the program abroad as they follow Krist and Singto's activities in Busan, South Korea which was then followed by a 3-minute special video.
5	"เราต้องไม่ยอม วันนี้เราต้องลุย (lit. transl. We must not agree. Today we have to go through.)"	15 November 2019	
Follow Krist and Singto as they do 3 fun activities: VR games, trampoline dodgeball and flowriding.
6	"ดำน้ำที่เกาะราชา จ.ภูเก็ต กับ คริส-สิงโต (lit. transl. Diving at Racha Island, Phuket with Krist-Singto)"	15 December 2019	
The season ends with Krist and Singto going to Racha Island, Phuket for diving and yacht sailing until the sun sets.
–	"เอาชีวิตให้รอดเพื่อเจอน้องนีโม่ - เหยี่ยวแดง (lit. transl. Survive to meet Nemo - Red Hawk)"	24 September 2020	
Krist and Singto go to Man Klang Island and Pak Nam Krasae in Rayong with a mission to find "Nemo" the clownfish and enjoy hawk-watching along the way.
–	"เปิดประสบการณ์คริส - สิงโต ขึ้น ฮ. ครั้งแรก (lit. transl. A first time experience for Krist and Singto)"	22 December 2020	
Krist and Singto get to experience riding a helicopter for the first time and ends the day with a cruise on the Chao Phraya River.

== Reception ==
In the LINE TV Thailand online TV ratings report for July 2020, the web series ranked third in the variety category with a rating of 0.0339% and a unique audience proportion of 75% female and 25% male. By the next month, it ranked fifth in the same category with a rating of 0.0088% and a unique audience proportion of 79% female and 21% male.
