= Perawat Sangpotirat =

Thai actor, model and singer (born 1995)

- พีรวัส แสงโพธิรัตน์
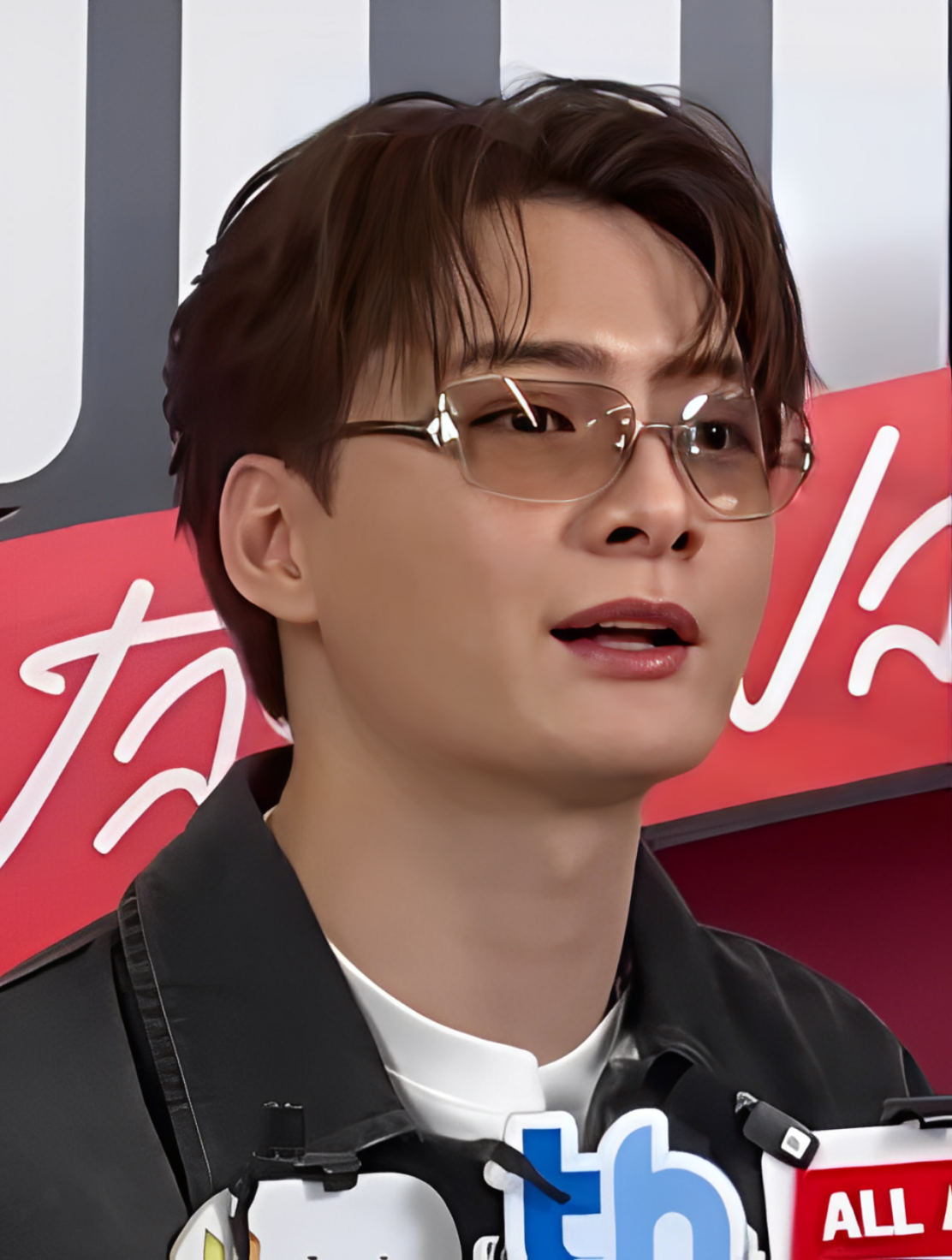
- Perawat in May 2025
- Born: 18 October 1995 (age 31); Bangkok, Thailand
- Education: Kasetsart University
- Occupations: Actor; singer; TV host
- Years active: 2016–present
- Agent: GMMTV
- Known for: Arthit in SOTUS and SOTUS S; Watee in I'm Tee, Me Too; Phi in The Ex-Morning
- Height: 1.76 m (5 ft 9 in)
- Musical career
- Instruments: Vocals; drum; guitar; piano
- Years active: 2016–present
- Website: GMMTV Artists

Perawat Sangpotirat (Thai: พีรวัส แสงโพธิรัตน์; born 18 October 1995), nicknamed Krist (Thai: คริส), also known by the Chinese name Wang Huizhen (Chinese: 王慧侦), is a Thai actor, singer, and host under GMMTV. His breakthrough role came in 2016 with the popular boys' love series SOTUS, where he portrayed the character Arthit. His other notable series including Mint To Be (2018), Love Beyond Frontier (2019) and Who Are You (2020).

== Early life and education ==
Perawat was born in Bangkok, Thailand. He graduated from Satriwitthaya 2 School and from the Faculty of Economics at Kasetsart University.

== Career ==
Perawat made his acting debut in 2016 with the Thai BL series SOTUS where he played the lead role of Arthit alongside Prachaya Ruangroj (Singto) who played Kongphop. The series catapulted both of them to stardom and gained a massive global following, thus giving birth to the PERAYA fandom (a portmanteau of their names PERawat and prachAYA).

In 2017, Perawat played the lead role of Mek alongside Methika Jiranorraphat (Jane) in Teenage Mom: The Series which was based on a Thai webtoon named Teen Mom. In 2017, he also starred in Senior Secret Love: Puppy Honey 2 in a supporting role.

In 2018, Perawat once again portrayed the lead role of Arthit in the sequel of SOTUS, SOTUS S alongside co-star Prachaya Ruangroj.

On 11 June 2018, Perawat released his debut single "Door, Air and a Good Day" (which would later be used in the soundtrack of TV show Mint To Be).

Later in 2018, Perawat played the title character Mint in GMM25 show Mint To Be alongside Worranit Thawornwong (Mook) which was based on the novel of the same name and was simultaneously telecasted on Chinese video streaming website Tencent Video which garnered massive views in a short amount of time, partly due to his large Chinese fan following. It became one of the hottest Thai dramas in China.

On 4 March 2019, Perawat released his second single "SKY" which he co-produced and wrote the lyrics for the rap section.

On 8 November 2020, on One 31, Perawat worked together with Kluea as a MC for a music show titled The Golden Song: Season 3.

On 1 April 2021, GMMTV launched "Boys Don’t Cry", a project including 9 male artists including Perawat. Each will release 1 song portraying heartbreak and displaying how men too could cry. He is the first to release his song entitled "Missing" and released the official MV.

On 22 August 2021, The Star Idol launched 2 MCs, Pakachon Vo-onsri and Perawat Sangpotirat.

On 12 Dec 2021, Perawat worked together with Kluea continually as a MC for The Golden Song: Season 4.

On 15 September 2022, he debuted in his first musical work ลิขิตรักชิงบัลลังก์.

In 2023, Perawat portrayed the lead role of "Kawi" opposite Gawin Caskey in the series Be My Favorite, which is the adaptation of Jittirain's novel You Are My Favorite (บทกวีของปีแสง).

In 2025, Perawat reunited with Prachaya Ruangroj for the highly anticipated BL series The Ex-Morning, a project that has generated significant buzz among fans. He also has a confirmed lead role as Pathaphi Sinan in The Ex-Morning and will appear in Must-Read (2026).

== Filmography ==
=== Film ===
Year	Title	Role	Notes	Ref.
2016	Little Big Dream	Himself	Guest role	
2021	My Rhythm	Koh	Main role	
2025	Nak Rak Mak Mak Mak	Mak	Main role	

=== Short film ===
Year	Title	Role	Notes	Network
2018	My Baby Bright: Best Friends Forever	Tod	Main role	YouTube
2019	Baby Bright 2 - Destiny calls	Sunny	Main role	YouTube
2020	Love Stranger	"Tee" Teerapat	Main role	AIS Play
2022	Baby Bright 3 - Double Trouble	Agent Krist	Main role	YouTube

=== Television series ===
Key
†	Denotes television productions that have not yet been released

Year	Title	Role	Notes	Network	Ref.
2008	Wa Wun Run Lek	New	Supporting role	?	
2016	SOTUS	"Oon" Arthit Rojnapat	Main role	LINE TV, One 31	
2017	Senior Secret Love: Puppy Honey 2	Night	Supporting role	One 31	
2017	Teenage Mom: The Series	Mek	Main role	LINE TV, One 31	
2017	SOTUS S	"Oon" Arthit Rojnapat	Main role	LINE TV, One 31	
2018	Mint To Be	Mint	Main role	GMM25	
2018	Happy Birthday	Himself	Guest role	GMM25	
2018	Our Skyy: Arthit-Kongphop	"Oon" Arthit Rojnapat	Main role	LINE TV	
2019	Love Beyond Frontier	Wang	Main role	GMM 25	
2019	One Night Steal	Nott	Main role	GMM 25	
2020	Who Are You	"Na" Natee Wanacharoen	Main role	GMM 25	
2020	I'm Tee, Me Too	Watee Reuangritthiroj	Main role	GMM 25	
2021	An Eye for an Eye	"Yu" Wayu	Main role	GMM 25	
2022	The War of Flowers	"Korn" Worakorn	Main role	GMM 25	
2022	Good Old Days: Story 6: Somewhere Only We Belong	Hey	Main role	GMM 25	
2023	Be My Favorite	"Kawi" Botkawi Nitiphat	Main role	GMM 25	
2023	The Jungle	Hack	Main role	GMM 25	
2025	The Ex-Morning	"Phi" Pathaphi Sinan	Main role	GMM 25	
2026	Wu	Li Puo Saeming	Supporting role	GMM 25	
TBA	Write You Again †	Nine	Main role	TBA	
TBA	Your Eyes, My Ears †	Pun	Main role	TBA	

=== Short series ===
Year	Title	Role	Notes	Network
2020	New Generation	Tim	Main role	NBTC Thailand
2021	What The Healthy	Tim	Main role	NBTC Thailand
2021	Caring is Contagious	"Oon" Arthit Rojnapat	Main role	GMMTV
2022	Love Memories	Phuping	Main role	Thai PBS

=== Music video appearances ===
Year	Title	Artist	Label	Ref.
2025	"ความเจ็บที่รัก (Consent)"; The Ex-Morning OST	Singto Prachaya	GMMTV Records	

=== Variety shows ===
Year	Title	Episode	Role
2015	High School Reunion	Ep. 102	Guest
2015	Talk with Toey Tonight	Ep. 101	Guest
2016	Let's Play Challenge	Ep. 13, 14, 22, 41	Guest
2016	Cougar on the Prowl	Ep.3	Guest
2016	GMM GRAMMY ถวายความจงรักภักดี และแสดงความอาลัยในหลวง ร.9		Guest
2017	#TEAMGIRL	Ep. 27–28, 45, 78–79, 119	Guest
2017	Termites in the House	Ep. 25	Guest
2017	Lip Sync Battle Thailand	Ep. 7	Guest
2017	Q&A with Admin	Ep. 5	Guest
2017	OffGun Fun Night	Ep. 1–2, 4	Guest
2018	Woody World	Ep. 11	Guest
2018	School Rangers	Ep. 9–10, 32–33, 44–46, 70–71, 99–101, 104–105, 118–119, 175–176, 214–215	Guest
2018	Talk with Toey One Night	Ep. 67	Guest
2018	Yai & the Grandsons	Ep. 3–4	Guest
2018	TayNew Meal Date	Ep. 11	Guest
2018	How Well Do You Know Each Other		Guest
2019	Opal All Around Season 3	Ep. 1–2	Guest
2019	Arm Share	Ep. 6, 8–9, 30, 42, 45, 53, 77, 83, 85	Guest
2019	Friend.ship with Krist-Singto	Ep. 1–6	Host
2019	OffGun Fun Night Season 2	Ep. 3	Guest
2019	Journey of Life	Ep. 67	Guest
2019	4 ต่อ 4 Celebrity		Guest
2019	Be My Baby	Ep.8	Guest
2020	Talk with Toey	Ep. 19, 34	Guest
2020	SosatSeoulsay	Ep. 6	Guest
2020	Come & Join Gun	Ep. 4	Guest
2020	Live At Lunch Season 1	Ep. 7, 18	Regular Member
2020	Play Zone	Cooking Club (Ep. 2)	Guest
2020	Friend Drive	Ep. 6–7	Guest
2020	TayNew Meal Date Special	Ep. 1	Guest
2020	Tred Tray with Tay Tawan Special	Ep. 3–4	Guest
2020	The Wall Song	Ep. 46	Guest
2020	Friend.Ship with Krist-Singto Special	Ep. 1–3	Host
2020	10 Fight 10: Season 2	Ep. 3	Guest
2021	Hueb Talk	Ep. 3	Guest
2021	Talk with ToeyS	Ep. 29	Guest
2021	Krahai Lao	Ep. 8	Guest
2021	OffGun Mommy Taste Special	Ep. 2	Guest
2021	Live At Lunch Season 2	Ep. 3	Guest
2021	Isuzu Max Challenge	[Black Dragon Team Member] (Ep. 3–4) Regular Member	Guest
2021	Live At Lunch: Friend Lunch Friend Live	Ep. 3	Guest
2021	E.M.S Earth-Mix Space	Ep. 5	Guest
2021	E.M.S Earth - Mix Space Extra	Ep. 4	Guest
2021	Amazing Thai Festival Osaka 2021		Host
2021	Safe House: Season 2	Ep. 1–4, 7	Regular Member
2021	TOPTAPTALK	Ep. 23	Guest
2021	4 ต่อ 4 Celebrity		Guest
2022	T-POP stage	Ep 5	Guest
2022	The Wall Song ร้องข้ามกำแพง	Ep. 106, 115	Guest
2022	Hollywood Game Night Thailand	CH3	Guest
2022	Oneสนั่นจอ		Guest
2022	Celebrities make me rich (ดาราพารวย)	Ep. 90, 101	Guest
2022	Who's single (รู้ไหมใครโสด)	Ep. 9, 18	Guest
2022	Sound check	Ep. 36, 117	Guest
2022	Who's single (รู้ไหมใครโสด)	[Guru] (Ep. 9)	Guest
2022	Songkran Festival at Kingpower Rangnam		Guest
2022	Woody show		Guest
2022	Today Show TV	CH3	Guest
2022	Daily Show	Ep. 65, 150, 200 - One31	Guest
2022	What Is in Your Car?	Ep. 14	Guest
2022	Tower of love	[Cupid] (Ep. 5)	Guest
2022	Young Survivors	[Leader] (Ep. 1, 3)	Regular Member
2022	4 ต่อ 4 Celebrity		Guest
2022	Secret love - CH3	Ep 22	Guest
2022	T-POP stage	Ep. 48	Guest
2022	นักร้อง2ชั้น		Guest
2022	The Story	{The Golden Song} (Ep. 12–13)	Guest
2022	Project Alpha	Ep. 12	Guest
2023	รถโรงเรียนSchoolRangers		Guest
2023	Sound Check 2023	Ep. 55	Guest
2023	Roo Mai Krai Sod 2023	[Guru] (Ep. 31)	Guest
2023	Kleur Wonder	Ep. 101	Guest
2023	Kratai Tuen Ru		Host
2023	Hungry Tiger Game	Ep. 1	Guest
2024	The Story 2024	{Krist Perawat} (Ep. 10-11)	Guest
2024	2Faces	(Ep. 47) [Twin] (Ep. 90)	Guest
2024	Pepsi Friend Feast Guide with Gemini-Fourth	Ep. 11	Guest
2025	Goodbye My Luck	Ep. 28	Guest
2025	Sound Check 2025	Ep. 18	Guest
2025	The Story 2025	{Rueang Lao Khuen Fao Phee} (Ep. 1)	Guest
2026	Name the Frame	Ep. 50–52	Guest
2026	Roo Mai Krai Sod 2026	[Guru] (Ep. 23)	Guest
2026	Cloud Dream Project	[Special mentor] (Ep. 4)	Guest

=== Musical ===
Year	Title	Role	Date	Place
2022	Likit Ruk Banlang Satoen	Main role	September 15, 17–18, 24–25	Muangthai Ratchadalai Theatre

== Hosting ==
=== TV shows ===
Year	Title	Network
2020	The Golden Song: Season 3	One31
2021	The Star Idol	One31
2021	The Golden Song: Season 4	One31
2023	The Golden Song: Season 5	One31
2023	The Golden Singer	One31
2024	The Golden Song: Season 6	One31
2025	The Golden Song: Season 7	One31
2025	Veiled Musician Thailand	WeTV
2026	The Golden Song: All Stars	One31

== Discography ==
=== Albums ===
==== Studio albums ====
Title	Details	Ref.
Silhouettes	Released: 20 October 2026; Label: Riser Music; Format: CD, digital download, streaming	

==== As featured artist ====
Year	Album	Song title	Label	Ref.
2020	Love Stranger	"ถอนหายใจในใจ (Sigh in My Heart)" with Getsunova	GMM Grammy	
2021	Boys Don't Cry	"ขอโทษที่ยังร้องไห้ (Missing)"	GMMTV Records	
2025	Best of GMMTV Vol.1	"เสียงจากสายตา (Eye Contact)" with Singto Prachaya	GMMTV Records	
2026	Best of GMMTV Vol.2	"รักก็ได้ (Morning Love)" with Singto Prachaya	GMMTV Records	

=== Singles ===
==== Digital singles ====
Year	Song title	Album	Label	Ref.
2019	"SKY"	—N/a	GMM Grammy	
2022	"นอนไม่พอ (SLEEPLESS)"	Silhouettes	GMMTV Records	
2023	"เจ็บเมื่อไหร่ (Call Me)"	Silhouettes	Riser Music	
2023	"คนขี้เหงา (Home Alone)" ft. Gun Napat	—N/a	LOVEiS+	
2023	"คืนนี้ออกไหม (Night Out)"	Silhouettes	Riser Music	
2025	"เติมเธอ (Fill My Heart)"	Silhouettes	Riser Music	
2026	"ความคิดถึงที่ไม่จำเป็น (Friend Zone)" ft. Nanon Korapat	Silhouettes	Riser Music	
2026	"ถูกที่ผิดเวลา (Wrong Time)"	Silhouettes	Riser Music	
2026	"Butterflies" ft. Pup Potato	Silhouettes	Riser Music	
2026	"ครบรอบไปด้วยกัน (Counting Till I Die)"	Silhouettes	Riser Music	

===== Collaborations =====
Year	Song title	Label	Ref.
2017	"เธอทำให้ฉันโชคดี (You Make Me Lucky)" with Singto Prachaya	GMM Grammy	
2017	"你让我幸 (My Smile)" with Singto Prachaya	GMM Grammy	
2020	"ขวัญ (Gift)" with Singto Prachaya	JOOX Thailand	
2020	"You're So Beautiful" with Stokes Nielson	GMMTV Records	
2020	"ตุ๊บๆ จุ๊บๆ OK!" with Singto Prachaya, Off Jumpol, Gun Attaphan, Bright Vachirawit, Win Metawin	GMMTV Records	
2022	"กฎของแรงดึงดูด (The Law of Attraction)" with Singto Prachaya, Off Jumpol, Gun Attaphan, Tay Tawan, New Thitipoom, Bright Vachirawit, Win Metawin	GMMTV Records	
2024	"มีเธอมีฉัน (Safe Zone)" with Gawin Caskey, Nanon Korapat, Bright Norraphat, Peck Palitchoke, Film Thanapat, Jam Rachata, PERSES	GMM Grammy	
2024	"เสียงจากสายตา (Eye Contact)" with Singto Prachaya	GMMTV Records	
2025	"สิ่งที่คิด (BETTER THAN)" with Singto Prachaya	GMMTV Records	

===== Soundtrack appearances =====
Year	Song title	Soundtrack	Label	Ref.
2018	"ประตู อากาศ และวันดีดี (Door, Air and a Good Day)"	Mint To Be OST	GMMTV Records	
2019	"Love Beyond Frontier"	The More I Love, The More I Hurt OST	GMMTV Records	
2019	"เสียงจากดาวพลูโต (Voice from Pluto)"	One Night Steal OST	GMMTV Records	
2019	"ไม่กลัว (Not Afraid)" with Pluem Purim, Sing Harit	One Night Steal OST	GMMTV Records	
2019	"ไปด้วยกัน..ไหม? (Shall We Go Together?)" with Pluem Purim, Sing Harit	One Night Steal OST	GMMTV Records	
2020	"คนโชคไม่ดีที่โชคดี (Lucky Man)"	One Night Steal OST	GMMTV Records	
2020	"My Baby Bright" with Singto Prachaya	My Baby Bright OST	?	
2022	"เกลียดเธอไม่ลง (I Can't Hate You)"	The War of Flowers OST	GMMTV Records	
2022	"Good Old Days"	Good Old Days OST	GMMTV Records	
2023	"ย้อนเวลา (REDO)"	Be My Favorite OST	GMMTV Records	
2023	"ขอบคุณเท่าไหร่ก็ไม่พอ (Thankful)"	Be My Favorite OST	GMMTV Records	
2023	"It Might Be You (เธอก็พอ)" with Gawin Caskey	Be My Favorite OST	GMMTV Records	
2023	"Beast Inside" with Off Jumpol, Nanon Korapat, Lee Thanat, Luke Ishikawa	The Jungle OST	GMMTV Records	
2023	"ฉันดีกว่า (Treat You Like Angels)"	The Jungle OST	GMMTV Records	
2025	"รักก็ได้ (Morning Love)" with Singto Prachaya	The Ex-Morning OST	GMMTV Records	
2025	"แก้ข่าว (Renew)"	The Ex-Morning OST	GMMTV Records	
2025	"ไกลหัวใจ (Far From My Heart)" with Yada Narilya	Nak Rak Mak Mak Mak OST	Black Dragon Entertainment	

===== Promotional singles =====
Year	Song title	Label	Ref.
2020	"ขอเป็นคนหนึ่ง (Let Me Be The One)" with Singto Prachaya, Ada Chunhavajira	Special Olympics Thailand	
2020	"Under the Same Moon" with Singto Prachaya, Ada Chunhavajira	Special Olympics Thailand	

=== Producing and writing credits ===
Year	Artist	Song title
2019	Himself	"SKY"
2020	Himself with Stokes Nielson	"You're So Beautiful"
2021	Nanon Korapat	"จักรวาลที่ฉันต้องการมีแค่เธอ (My Universe Is You)"
2021	Mek Jirakit	"แค่... (Just So You Know)"
2021	Himself	"ขอโทษที่ยังร้องไห้ (Missing)"
2022	Aye Sarunchana	"ยอม (Agree)"
2022	Himself	"เกลียดเธอไม่ลง (I Can't Hate You)"
2022	Himself	"นอนไม่พอ (SLEEPLESS)"
2023	Himself	"คืนนี้ออกไหม (Night Out)"

=== Composer credits ===
Year	Artist	Song title
2019	Himself	"เสียงจากดาวพลูโต (Voice from Pluto)"
2023	Himself	"ขอบคุณเท่าไหร่ก็ไม่พอ (Thankful)"

== Fan meetings ==
Solo

Title	Date	Venue	Ref.
GMMTV Fan Time in Fukuoka	28 January 2024	Nishitetsu Hall, Fukuoka	
Happy New Year: Krist Fan Sign in Beijing	22 February 2025	Beijing, China	
Goodbye Winter, Welcome Spring: Krist Fan Sign in Shanghai	7 February 2026	Shanghai, China	

Joint

Title	Date	Venue	Notes	Ref.
KristSingto Fan Meeting in Hangzhou	18 February 2017	Hangzhou Magic Theatre, Hangzhou	With Singto	
At First Sight with Rookie Boys in Guangzhou	24 March 2017	Guangzhou Performing Arts Center Theater, Guangzhou	With Singto, Off, New, Gunsmile, Oaujun	
KristSingto Fan Meeting in Suzhou	22 April 2017	Suzhou Culture and Arts Centre, Suzhou	With Singto	
KristSingto Fan Meeting in Nanjing	23 April 2017	Nanjing Culture and Art Center, Nanjing	With Singto	
KristSingto Fan Meeting in Shenzhen	16 June 2017	Shenzhen Poly Theater, Shenzhen	With Singto	
KristSingto Fan Meeting in Hangzhou	17 June 2017	Hangzhou Grand Theater, Hangzhou	With Singto	
KristSingto, Off & New Fan Meeting in Chengdu	22 July 2017	Jincheng Art Palace, Chengdu	With Singto, Off, New	
SOTUS S Nation and Fan Meeting	16 December 2017	Kad Suan Kaew Shopping Center, Chiang Mai	With SOTUS S cast	
SOTUS S Nation and Fan Meeting	23 December 2017	Terminal 21 Shopping Center, Korat	With SOTUS S cast	
SOTUS S Nation and Fan Meeting	13 January 2018	Central Plaza Ladprao, Bangkok	With SOTUS S cast	
SOTUS S Hazing in Manila	20 January 2018	Pasig City Hall Complex, Manila	With SOTUS S cast	
SOTUS S Nation and Fan Meeting	27 January 2018	Hatyai Hall, Central Festival Hatyai Shopping Center	With SOTUS S cast	
SOTUS S Fan Meeting in Chengdu	17 March 2018	Zhenghuo Art Center, Chengdu	With SOTUS S cast	
SOTUS S Fan Meeting in Taipei	25 March 2018	ATT Show Box, Taipei	With SOTUS S cast	
SOTUS S Fan Meeting in Tianjin	31 March 2018	Tianjin Wuqing Theater, Tianjin	With SOTUS S cast	
KristSingto Fan Meeting in Singapore	1 July 2018	Kallang Theatre, Singapore	With Singto	
KristSingto Fan Meeting in Korea	7 July 2018	Sungshin Women's University, Woonjung Green Campus	With Singto	
SOTUS S Fan Meeting in Wuhan	14 July 2018	Wuhan Cultural Museum Center, Wuhan	With SOTUS S cast	
KristSingto Fan Meeting in Hong Kong	21-22 July 2018	KITEC LIVE	With Singto	
SOTUS S Fan Meeting in Wuxi	25 August 2018	HUALUXE Wuxi Taihu, Wuxi	With SOTUS S cast	
SOTUS: ENCORE Fan Meeting in Taipei	22 September 2018	Taipei International Convention Center	With SOTUS S cast	
KristSingto Fan Meeting in Jakarta	17 November 2018	Upperroom Jakarta	With Singto	
Lazada Presents: KristSingto Fan Meeting in Bangkok	29 November 2018	Srinakharinwirot University, Bangkok	With Singto	
KristSingto Fan Meeting in Yangon	2 December 2018	National Theatre of Yangon, Yangon	With Singto	
KristSingto Fan Meeting in Japan	15 December 2018	EBiS 303 Event Hall, Tokyo	With Singto	
KristSingto Fan Meeting in Qingdao	9 March 2019	Qingdao Mangrove Tree Resort World, Conference and Exhibition Center	With Singto	
KristSingto & TayNew Fan Meeting in Hong Kong	14 April 2019	KITEC LIVE	With Singto, Tay, New	
KristSingto Fan Meeting in Vietnam	26 May 2019	GALA Center, Ho Chi Minh city	With Singto	
KristSingto Fan Meeting in Busan	22 June 2019	Dongnae Cultural Center, Busan	With Singto	
Peraya Party - KristSingto Fan Meeting in Thailand	6-7 Julyy 2019	Chaengwatthana Hall, CentralPlaza Chaengwattana	With Singto	
Our Skyy Fan Meeting in Taipei	21 July 2019	Taipei International Convention Center	With Singto, Off, Gun, Tay, New, Drake, Frank, Pluem, Chimon	
KristSingto Fan Meeting in Manila	17 August 2019	SM Sky Dome, SM City North EDSA	With Singto	
KristSingto Fan Meeting in Taipei	19 October 2019	ATT Show Box, Taipei	With Singto	
Our Skyy Fan Meeting in Myanmar	9 November 2019	Pullman Yangon Centrepoint Hotel, Myanmar	With Singto, Off, Gun, Tay, New, Drake, Frank, Pluem, Chimon	
KristSingto Fan Meeting in Chengdu	16 November 2019	Chengdu Overseas Chinese Town Grand Theatre	With Singto	
KristSingto Fan Meeting in Japan	21 December 2019	Nissho Hall, Tokyo	With Singto	
KristSingto Fan Meeting in Hong Kong	28 December 2019	KITEC LIVE	With Singto	
Worldwide Live Fan Meeting: KristSingto	30 May 2020	V LIVE	With Singto	
The Precious Memories: KristSingto Fan Meeting in Japan	17 December 2022	Yokohama Hall, Tokyo	With Singto	
KristSingto Fan Meeting in Macau	14 July 2024	JW Marriot Grand Ball Room, Macau	With Singto	
GMMTV Fan Day 14 in Vietnam	10 August 2024	Ben Thanh theater, Ho Chi Minh city	With Singto	
GMMTV Fan Day 15 in Singapore	19 October 2024	GV Max Vivocity, Singapore	With Singto	
GMMTV Fan Day 16 in Cambodia	25-26 January 2025	Aeon Mall, Sensok City	With Singto	
25th Thai Festival Tokyo: KristSingto Special Fan Meeting	8 May 2025	New Pier hall, Tokyo	With Singto	
The First Ex-Morning	23 May 2025	Siam Pavalai Paragon Cineplex	With The Ex-Morning cast	
The Ex-Morning Final EP. Fan Meeting	24 July 2025	Siam Pavalai Paragon Cineplex	With The Ex-Morning cast	
KristSingto Fan Meeting in Taipei	30 August 2025	WESTAR	With Singto	
GMMTV Fan Day 25 in USA	14 September 2025	Alex Theatre, Los Angeles	With Singto	
AGAin 2015 - 10 Years Together: KristSingto Fan Meeting in Seoul	25 October 2025	Yoodang Art Hall, Seoul	With Singto	
KristSingto Fan Meeting in Berlin	9 November 2025	Estrel Hotel, Berlin	With Singto	
26th Thai Festival Tokyo: KristSingto Special Fan Meeting	9 May 2026	New Pier Hall, Tokyo	With Singto	
Wu Destiny After Party	1 July 2026	MCC Hall (3rd floor), The Mall Lifestore Bangkapi	With Wu cast	

== Live performances ==
Year	Title	Date	Place
2020	Big Mountain music festival 11	12 December 2020	The Ocean Khao Yai
2022	Octopus 2022	15 October 2022	Rajamangala stadium
2022	Big Mountain music festival 12	10–11 December 2022	The Ocean Khao Yai
2023	Big Mountain music festival 13	9–10 December 2023	The Ocean Khao Yai
2024	Big Mountain music festival 14	7–8 December 2024	The Ocean Khao Yai

== Concerts ==
Solo

Tour	Title	Date	Venue	Ref.
Krist Solo Concert Asia Tour	Krist Solo Concert in Japan	9 April 2023	Kenmin Hall, Kangawa	
Krist Solo Concert Asia Tour	Krist Solo Concert in Japan	16 April 2023	Orix Theater, Osaka	
Krist Solo Concert Asia Tour	Krist Solo Concert in Cambodia	15 July 2023	Aeon Mall, Mean Chey	
Krist Solo Concert Asia Tour	Krist Solo Concert in Macau	22 July 2023	Broadway Theatre, Macau	
Krist Solo Concert Asia Tour	Krist Solo Concert in Indonesia	19 August 2023	Balai Sarbini, Jakarta	

Joint

Title	Date	Venue	Notes	Ref.
Meet Greet Eat ว้าก With Sotus the series	14 January 2017	Scala Cinema, Siam Square, Bangkok	With SOTUS cast	
Y I Love U Fan Party	3 September 2017	Thunder Dome, Muang Thong Thani	With Singto, Off, Gun, Earth, New, Sing, Tay, Got, Amp, Gun Achi	
SOTUS: The Memories	5 May 2018	Thunder Dome, Muang Thong Thani	With SOTUS cast	
Y I Love U Fan Party 2019 next to Ha Island Y	26-27 January 2019	Thunder Dome, Muang Thong Thani	With Singto, Off, Gun, Tay, New, Drake, Frank, Earth, Oaujun, Fiat, Guy, Nammon, Neo, Phuwin	
SOTUS The Reunion 4ever More	22 August 2020	V LIVE	With SOTUS cast	
GMMTV Fantopia 2020	21-22 November 2020	Impact Arena, Muang Thong Thani	With Singto	
Love Out Loud Fan Fest 2022	20 August 2022	Impact Arena, Muang Thong Thani	With Singto, Off, Gun, Tay, New, Bright, Win	
GMMTV Fan Fest 2022: Japan	27-28 August 2022	PIA LIVE STREAM	With Tay, New, Bright, Win, Earth, Mix, Ohm, Nanon, Dew, Nani	
GMMTV Musicon 2023: Tokyo	29 July 2023	Zepp Divercity, Tokyo	With Gawin, Nanon, Joong, Gemini, Perth, LYKN	
GMMTV Musicon 2023: Tokyo	30 July 2023	Toyosu PIT, Tokyo	With Gawin, Nanon, Joong, Gemini, Perth, LYKN	
GMMTV Fan Fest 2023: Japan	9 October 2023	Pia Arena MM, Yokohama	With Gawin, Earth, Mix, Pond, Phuwin, Force, Book, Joong, Dunk, Jimmy, Sea, First, Khaotung, Gemini, Fourth, Perth, Chimon	
The Krist Elements Concert	21-22 October 2023	Union Hall, Union Mall	With Singto, Off, Gun, Tay, New, Gawin	
GMMTV Starlympics 2023	23 December 2023	Impact Arena, Muang Thong Thani	GMMTV Artists	
Krist & Bright Countdown Concert in Japan	30-31 December 2023	Toyosu PIT, Tokyo	With Bright	
Peraya Party Begin Again	15 June 2024	Union Hall, Union Mall	With Singto	
GMMTV Musicon 2024: Hong Kong	18 August 2024	AXA Dreamland, Go Park	With Nanon, Sea, Khaotung, Perth, LYKN	
GMMTV Starlympics 2024	21 December 2024	Impact Arena, Muang Thong Thani	GMMTV Artists	
GMMTV Musicon 2025: Nanning	5 January 2025	Guanxi Sports center Gymnasium, Nanning	With Nanon, Phuwin, Dunk, Fourth, Perth, LYKN	
GMMTV Fan Fest 2025: Japan	13 January 2025	Tokyo Garden Theater, Tokyo	With Singto, Off, Gun, Tay, New, Pond, Phuwin, Jimmy, Sea, Gemini, Fourth	
PEBACA What A Concert in Bangkok	22 March 2025	Thunder Dome, Muang Thong Thani	With Singto, Off, Gun, Tay, New	
PerthSanta Time Stopper Fancon	20 July 2025	Union Hall, Union Mall	With Perth, Santa, Nanon	
GMMTV Musicon 2025: Tokyo	26-27 July 2025	Toyosu PIT	With Gawin, Satang, Keen, Barcode, LYKN, JASP.ER	
PEBACA What A Concert in Singapore	7 September 2025	D'Marquee Downtown East, Singapore	With Singto, Off, Gun, Tay, New	
PEBACA What A Concert in Japan	28 September 2025	Toyosu PIT, Tokyo	With Singto, Off, Gun, Tay, New	
PEBACA What A Concert in Manila	22 November 2025	Up theater, Manila, Philippines	With Singto, Off, Gun, Tay, New	
GMMTV Starlympics 2025	20 December 2025	Impact Arena, Muang Thong Thani	GMMTV Artists	
GMMTV Fan Fest 2026: Japan	21 February 2026	Tokyo Garden Theater, Japan	With Singto, Off, Gun, Tay, New, Boun, Prem, Pond, Phuwin, Joong, Dunk, Sky, Nani	
Toey Fair Festival Carnival 2026	3 March 2026	Union Hall, Union Mall	With Godji, Pompam, Jennie, Golf, Namtan	
PEBACA What A Concert in Taipei	22 March 2026	Zepp New Taipei	With Singto, Off, Gun, Tay, New	
GMMTV Musicon 2026: Singapore	30-31 May 2026	Arena @ Expo	With Nanon, Gawin, LYKN, JASP.ER, Felizz, Clo'ver	
JossGawin Heat & Beat Concert	28 July 2026	Union Hall, Union Mall	With Joss, Gawin, Singto, Lego and FLIO	
SOTUS Teniversary concert	29-30 August 2026	Union Hall, Union Mall	With Singto, New, Neen, Gunsmile, Fluke, Off, Jan, Ice, Oat, Wawa, Prince, Amp, Gun Achi	
Nineentertain 24th Anniversary Charity Concert	30 September 2026	Parc Paragon, Siam Paragon	With Jan, JingJing, Almond, Progress, Felizz, Clo'ver	
1st Album "Silhouettes" Listening & Birthday Party	20 October 2026	Iconsiam Hall, Iconsiam	With Nanon, Gunsmile, Fellow Fellow	
GMMTV Starlympics 2026	28 November 2026	Impact Arena, Muang Thong Thani	GMMTV Artists	
PEBACA Legacy Fam Concert	30–31 January 2027	BITEC LIVE	With Singto, Off, Gun, Tay, New, Nanon, Namtan, Gawin, Nani, JingJing, Prem, Sky, Bonnie, Phuwin	

== Awards and nominations ==
Year	Award	Category	Nominated work	Result	Ref.
2016	Council of Arts and Culture – Chulalongkorn University	Merit Award	—N/a	Won	
2017	2nd World Top Awards	Person of the Year	—N/a	Won	
2017	6th Attitude Award Anniversary	The Most Favorite TV Series of the Year Most Favorite couple of the year with Singto Prachaya	SOTUS	Won	
2017	5th YinYueTai V Chart Awards	Recommended Artist of YinYueTai with Singto Prachaya	SOTUS	Won	
2017	5th YinYueTai V Chart Awards	Most Popular New Artist	SOTUS	Nominated	
2017	5th YinYueTai V Chart Awards	Most Popular Artist of the Night	—N/a	Nominated	
2017	Kazz Awards 2017	Imaginary Couple of the Year with Singto Prachaya	SOTUS	Nominated	
2017	Kazz Awards 2017	Most Popular New Actor	SOTUS	Won	
2017	Kazz Awards 2017	Kazz Magazine's Favorite Star – Male	—N/a	Won	
2017	14th Kom Chad Luek Awards	Popular Vote – Male	SOTUS	Nominated	
2017	3rd Maya Awards	Best Couple with Singto Prachaya	SOTUS	Won	
2017	3rd Maya Awards	Male Rising Star (TV)	SOTUS	Nominated	
2018	1st Great Stars Social Awards	Social Super Star of the Year – Couple with Singto Prachaya	SOTUS S	Won	
2018	1st LINE TV Awards	Best Couple with Singto Prachaya	SOTUS S	Won	
2018	Thailand Zocial Awards 2018: Best Social Entertainment Awards	Best Actor on Social Media	—N/a	Nominated	
2018	Sanook! Top Vote of the Year	Best Couple with Singto Prachaya	SOTUS S	Won	
2018	5th Thailand Role Model Awards	Best Actor	—N/a	Won	
2018	Kazz Awards 2018	Most Popular Teen Actor – Male	SOTUS S	Nominated	
2018	Kazz Awards 2018	Imaginary Couple of the Year with Singto Prachaya	SOTUS S	Won	
2018	11th Nine Entertain Awards	Public Favorite	—N/a	Nominated	
2018	Attitude Award 7th Anniversary	The Most Favorite TV Series of the Year Most Favorite couple of the year with Singto Prachaya	SOTUS S	Won	
2018	4th Maya Awards	Best Couple with Singto Prachaya	SOTUS S	Won	
2018	4th Maya Awards	Male Rising Star	SOTUS S	Nominated	
2018	1st ET Thailand Awards	Influential Celebrity on Social Media	—N/a	Nominated	
2018	Thailand Headlines Person of The Year Awards 2018	Culture and Entertainment – Actor with Singto Prachaya	—N/a	Won	
2018	12th OK! Awards	Best Couple with Singto Prachaya	SOTUS S	Won	
2018	2nd Great Stars Social Awards	Couple of the Year with Singto Prachaya	SOTUS S	Won	
2019	Daradaily Awards 8	Male Rising Star of the Year	Mint To Be	Won	
2019	Line Sticker Awards 2019	Best Couple with Singto Prachaya	—N/a	Won	
2019	Kazz Awards 2019	Most Popular Young Actor	—N/a	Won	
2019	Kazz Awards 2019	Imaginary Couple of the Year with Singto Prachaya	—N/a	Won	
2019	Kazz Awards 2019	Hot Guy of the Year	—N/a	Won	
2019	15th Kom Chad Leuk Awards	Popular Pop Music Singer	SKY	Nominated	
2019	15th Kom Chad Leuk Awards	Popular Actor	SOTUS S	Nominated	
2019	15th Kom Chad Leuk Awards	Most Popular Thai Series	SOTUS S	Won	
2019	Zoomdara New Year 2019	Best Couple with Singto Prachaya	SOTUS S	Won	
2019	5th Maya Awards	Favorite Male Singer	SKY	Won	
2019	5th Maya Awards	Favorite Male Star	—N/a	Nominated	
2019	5th Maya Awards	Best Couple with Mook Worranit	Mint To Be	Nominated	
2020	14th Kazz Awards	Popular Actor	—N/a	Won	
2020	14th Kazz Awards	Imaginary Couple of the Year with Singto Prachaya	—N/a	Won	
2020	6th Maya Awards	Male Star	One Night Steal	Nominated	
2020	Zoomdara Awards & Showcase 2020	Best Actor	Who Are You	Won	
2021	15th Kazz Awards	Popular Male Teenage	—N/a	Nominated	
2021	1st Siam Series Awards	Popular Lead Actor	Who Are You	Nominated	
2021	7th Maya Awards	Charming Boy	—N/a	Nominated	
2022	18th Kom Chad Leuk Awards	Popular Couple with Singto Prachaya	—N/a	Nominated	
2022	18th Kom Chad Leuk Awards	Popular Actor	—N/a	Nominated	
2022	10th Thailand Zocial Awards	Best Entertainment on Social Media - Actor	—N/a	Nominated	
2022	13rd Zoomdara Awards 2021	MC of the Year	—N/a	Won	
2022	13rd Zoomdara Awards 2021	Popular Single	Under the Same Moon with Singto Prachaya, Ada Chunhavajira	Won	
2023	TikTok Awards 2023	Viral song of the year - Appreciation Award	Call me	Won	
2024	8th Thailand Headlines Person of the Year Awards	Top influential social media person of the year award - Culture and Entertainment – Actor with Singto Prachaya	SOTUS	Won	
2024	Yuniverse awards 2024	The best coming soon	The Ex-Morning	Nominated	
2025	Zoomdara Awards 2025	The hottest presenter of the year	The Golden Song	Won	
2025	Maya Awards	Male couple of the year with Singto Prachaya	The Ex-Morning	Nominated	
2025	Yuniverse awards 2025	Y iconic star	The Ex-Morning	Nominated	
2025	Thailand box office award 2025	Actor of the year (movie)	Nak Rak Mak Mak Mak	Nominated	
2026	Asian Academy Creative Awards 2026	Best Actor in a Supporting Role (Thailand)	Wu	Won	
