= Thitipoom Techaapaikhun =

Thai actor and television host (born 1993)

- ฐิติภูมิ เตชะอภัยคุณ
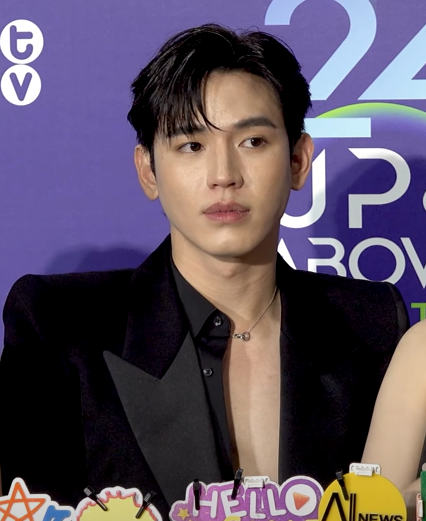
- Thitipoom in April 2024
- Born: 30 January 1993 (age 33); Bangkok, Thailand
- Other names: Newwiee, Thitiphumi Techaaphaikhun, Thitipoom Techaapaikhun
- Education: Chulalongkorn University Engineering (B.E.) Commerce and Accountancy (M.B.A.)
- Occupations: Actor; Television host
- Years active: 2013–present
- Agent: GMMTV
- Known for: Ray in Room Alone 401-410 and Room Alone 2; Kao in Kiss, Kiss Me Again and Dark Blue Kiss; Em in SOTUS and SOTUS S; Apo in Water Boyy; Tee-Det in I'm Tee, Me Too; Achi in Cherry Magic; Home in Peaceful Property; Kanit in A Dog and A Plane
- Height: 177 cm (5 ft 10 in)

Thitipoom Techaapaikhun (Thai: ฐิติภูมิ เตชะอภัยคุณ; born 30 January 1993), nicknamed New (Thai: นิว), is a Thai actor and television host. He is best known for Kiss: The Series (2016), Kiss Me Again (2018), and Dark Blue Kiss (2019). He went on to star in Cherry Magic (2023), the Thai adaptation of the Japanese manga of the same name.

== Early life and education ==
Thitipoom was born in Bangkok, Thailand. At age 3, he moved to Yala Province where he completed his lower secondary education in Kanarasadornbumroong Yala School. He later moved to Hat Yai, Songkhla Province where he completed his secondary education at Hat Yai Witthayalai School. He graduated with a bachelor's degree in electrical engineering from the Faculty of Engineering and a master's degree in business administration from the Faculty of Commerce and Accountancy, both at Chulalongkorn University.

== Career ==
Thitipoom started as a model and became one of the new hosts of Bang Channel's Five Live Fresh in 2013.

He made his acting debut in Room Alone 401–410, a 2014 television series by GMMTV. He later got the supporting role of Kao alongside Tawan Vihokratana for Kiss: The Series and Kiss Me Again and as M in SOTUS.

In 2017, he got the main role of Apo in Water Boyy, a TV remake of a film with the same name and reprised his role as M in SOTUS S.

In 2019, he reprised his role as Kao, this time as a main lead, in the third installment of Kiss: The Series titled Dark Blue Kiss, alongside Tawan.

He also starred in Classic Again, a Thai remake of the 2003 South Korean romantic drama The Classic and is working on I Need Romance 3. In 2022, he starred as Alex in the series The Warp Effect.

He continued his career with significant roles, notably starring in the 2023 series Cherry Magic, the highly anticipated Thai adaptation of a popular Japanese manga. In the series, he played the main character, Achi, a man who gains the ability to read minds after turning 30. The show, which paired him with Tawan, was well-received by fans in Thailand and globally, leading to trending topics on social media and high ratings.

In 2024, he took on the lead role of Home in the series Peaceful Property. Recently he made a guest appearance in Break Up Service, where he portrayed the new love interest of a character played by Tawan.

== Other ventures ==
Outside his acting career, New co-owns a spa called Bamboo Secrets along with Tawan Vihokratana and his own online clothing brand, Newwave. He is also an active stock trader.

== Filmography ==
=== Film ===
Year	Title	Role	Notes	Ref.
2018	WaterBro	Yang Fan	Support role	
2020	Classic Again	Kajorn	Main role	

=== Television series ===
Key
†	Denotes television productions that have not yet been released

Year	Title	Role	Notes	Ref.
2014	Room Alone 401-410	Ray	Supporting role	
2015	Ugly Duckling: Pity Girl	BM	Supporting role	
2015	Room Alone 2	Ray	Supporting role	
2016	Kiss: The Series	"Kao" Phanuwat Chotiwat	Supporting role	
2016	SOTUS	Em	Supporting role	
2016	U-Prince: The Absolute Economist	Pascal	Supporting role	
2016	U-Prince: The Foxy Pilot	Pascal	Supporting role	
2016	Little Big Dream	—N/a	Guest role	
2017	Water Boyy	Apo	Main role	
2017	U-Prince: The Crazy Artist	Pascal	Guest role	
2017	SOTUS S	Em	Supporting role	
2018	Kiss Me Again	"Kao" Phanuwat Chotiwat	Main role	
2018	Our Skyy	"Kao" Phanuwat Chotiwat	Main role	
2019	Wolf	Plan	Main role	
2019	Love Beyond Frontier	Win	Main role	
2019	Dark Blue Kiss	"Kao" Phanuwat Chotiwat	Main role	
2020	I'm Tee, Me Too	Tee-Det	Main role	
2021	The Comments	Kan	Main role	
2021	I Need Romance	Alan	Main role	
2021	Put Your Head on My Shoulder	Pupha	Main role	
2021	Love and Fortune	Chaiphat	Main role	
2022	You Are My Missing Piece	Yued	Main role	
2022	The Warp Effect	"Alex" Apiwat Phoothanthong	Main role	
2022	Dong Dok Mai	"Pharet" Boonpharet Wongjan	Supporting role	
2022	Club Sapan Fine 2	Pao	Main role	
2023	Cherry Magic	"Achi" Achirawit Jittawisut	Main role	
2023	Phanomnaka	D.Pong	Guest role	
2023	Manee Phitsawat	"Phoom" Phoomin Bunyagosin / Phruek	Main role	
2024	Peaceful Property	"Home" Saharat Vimarnsukman	Main role	
2025	Break Up Service	Um	Guest role	
2025	Head 2 Head	Tar	Guest role	
2025	Friendshit Forever	"Tao" Kongphop	Main role	
2025	Club Friday Theory of Love	Min	Main role	
2026	A Dog and a Plane	Khanit Sakdatawee	Main role	
2026	Peach and Me	Himself	Guest role	
2026	Good Boy	"Ji" Jiraphat Jaroenwong (older)	Guest role	
TBA	Chasing Love, Chasing Cash †	Job	Main role	
TBA	Pineapple Leaf Blade †	Phon	Main role	
TBA	Boys 4 Moms †	Tonmai	Main role	
TBA	Safety Flirt †	TBA	Supporting role	

=== Television shows ===
Year	Title	Notes	Ref.
2014	Five Live Fresh	Main host	
2018	School Rangers	Main host	
2018	Team Girl	Main host	
2018	TayNew Meal Date	Main host	

=== Music video appearances ===
Year	Title	Artist	Ref.
2021	"ไม่อาจหยุดรัก"	NUM KALA Feat. Boy Peacemaker	
2023	"ฉันมันเป็นคนแบบนี้"	Saharat Tiampan (Boom)	
2023	"มากกว่านี้ก็นางฟ้าแล้วปะ (Fangel)"	FANG	

== Discography ==
=== Singles ===
==== Collaborations ====
Year	Title	Label	Ref.
2022	"กฎของแรงดึงดูด (The Law of Attraction)" with Tay Tawan, Krist Perawat, Singto Prachaya, Off Jumpol, Gun Atthaphan, Bright Vachirawit, Win Metawin	GMMTV Records	
2023	"กอด กอด (Hugs)" with Tay Tawan, Off Jumpol, Gun Atthaphan, Pond Naravit, Phuwin Tangsakyuen, Gemini Norawit, Fourth Nattawat, Perth Tanpon, Chimon Wachirawit	GMMTV Records	
2025	"ชอบแบบนี้ (NO MORE)" with Tay Tawan	GMMTV Records	
2025	"เติมรักอีกนิด (A Little More Love)" with Tay Tawan	GMMTV Records	

==== Soundtrack appearances ====
Year	Title	Soundtrack	Label	Ref.
2019	"ไม่มีนิยาม (No Definition)" (with Tay Tawan)	Dark Blue Kiss OST	GMMTV Records	
2020	"มีรัก (My Love)"	Classic Again OST	CJ MAJOR Entertainment	
2023	"แอบตะโกน (Loudest Love)" (with Tay Tawan)	Cherry Magic OST	GMMTV Records	
2023	"พลังวิเศษของคนไม่พิเศษ (Everything is Magic)"	Cherry Magic OST	GMMTV Records	
2024	"ผีหยอก (Haunted House)" (with Tay Tawan)	Peaceful Property OST	GMMTV Records	
2026	"Fly With Me, Free My Heart"	A Dog and a Plane OST	GMMTV Records	
2026	"รักไม่มีเหตุผล (No Reason)" (with Tay Tawan)	A Dog and a Plane OST	GMMTV Records	

== Fan meetings ==
Solo

Title	Date	Venue	Ref.
Dedicated to You: New Fan Meeting in Chongqing	3 August 2024	Chongqing, China	
Year of Heart: New Fan Meeting in Suzhou	15 February 2025	Suzhou, China	
Under the Starlight: New Fan Meeting in Nanning	19 April 2025	Nanning, China	
PolcaFam: New & Polcasan Fan Meeting in Hangzhou	18 August 2025	Hangzhou, China	
A Moment of Summer Light with Polca Family: New & Polcasan Fan Sign in Shanghai	3 May 2026	Shanghai, China	

Joint

Title	Date	Venue	Notes	Ref.
At First Sight with Rookie Boys in Guangzhou	24 Mar 2017	Guangzhou Performing Arts Center Theater, Guangzhou	With Tay, Off, Singto, Gunsmile, Oaujun	
EarthNew Fan Meeting in Guangzhou	18 July 2017	Poly World Trade Center Expo, Guangzhou	With Earth	
KristSingto, Off & New Fan Meeting in Chengdu	22 Jul 2017	Jincheng Art Palace, Chengdu	With Tay, Off, Singto	
SOTUS S Nation and Fan Meeting	16 Dec 2017	Kad Suan Kaew Shopping Center, Chiang Mai	With SOTUS S cast	
SOTUS S Nation and Fan Meeting	23 Dec 2017	Terminal 21 Shopping Center, Korat	With SOTUS S cast	
SOTUS S Nation and Fan Meeting	13 Jan 2018	Central Plaza Ladprao, Bangkok	With SOTUS S cast	
SOTUS S Hazing in Manila	20 Jan 2018	Pasig City Hall Complex, Manila	With SOTUS S cast	
SOTUS S Nation and Fan Meeting	27 Jan 2018	Hatyai Hall, Central Festival Hatyai Shopping Center	With SOTUS S cast	
SOTUS S Fan Meeting in Chengdu	17 Mar 2018	Zhenghuo Art Center, Chengdu	With SOTUS S cast	
SOTUS S Fan Meeting in Taipei	25 Mar 2018	ATT Show Box, Taipei	With SOTUS S cast	
SOTUS S Fan Meeting in Tianjin	31 Mar 2018	Tianjin Wuqing Theater, Tianjin	With SOTUS S cast	
EarthNew Fan Meeting in Taipei	23 June 2018	Clapper Studio, Syntrend Creative Park	With Earth	
SOTUS S Fan Meeting in Wuhan	14 Jul 2018	Wuhan Cultural Museum Center, Wuhan	With SOTUS S cast	
SOTUS S Fan Meeting in Wuxi	25 Aug 2018	HUALUXE Wuxi Taihu, Wuxi	With SOTUS S cast	
SOTUS: ENCORE Fan Meeting in Taipei	22 Sep 2018	Taipei International Convention Center	With SOTUS S cast	
TayNew & Earth Fan Meeting in Manila	22 December 2018	TIU Theater, Manila	With Tay, Earth	
KristSingto & TayNew Fan Meeting in Hong Kong	14 Apr 2019	KITEC LIVE	With Tay, Krist, Singto	
TayNew Fan Meeting in Korea	11 May 2019	Howon Art Hall, Korea	With Tay	
Our Skyy Fan Meeting in Taipei	21 Jul 2019	Taipei International Convention Center	With Tay, Krist, Singto, Off, Gun, Drake, Frank, Pluem, Chimon	
TayNew & PluemChimon Fan Meeting in Myanmar	3 August 2019	Pullman Yangon Centrepoint Hotel	With Tay, Pluem, Chimon	
TayNew Fan Meeting in Guangzhou	10 August 2019	Nanfang Theatre, Guangzhou	With Tay	
Our Skyy Fan Meeting in Myanmar	9 Nov 2019	Pullman Yangon Centrepoint Hotel, Myanmar	With Tay, Krist, Singto, Off, Gun, Drake, Frank, Pluem, Chimon	
TayNew Fan Meeting in Chengdu	30 November 2019	Chengdu Rising Butterfly Hotel	With Tay	
Dark Blue Kiss: TayNew Fan Meeting in Taipei	21 December 2019	WESTAR	With Tay	
Worldwide Live Fan Meeting: TayNew	13 June 2020	V LIVE	With Tay	
Polca The Journey: TayNew Fan Meeting in Thailand	25 June 2022	Changwattana Hall, Central Chaengwattana	With Tay	
TayNew Fan Meeting in Manila	30 July 2022	The Theatre at Solaire, Solaire Resort & Casino	With Tay	
TayNew Fan Meeting in Korea	15 October 2022	Yearimdang Art Hall, Korea	With Tay	
TayNew Fan Meeting in Osaka	27 November 2022	Dojima River Forum, Hotarumachi	With Tay	
TayNew Fan Meeting in Hong Kong	2 April 2023	Kerry Hotel, Hong Kong	With Tay	
TayNew Fan Meeting in Singapore	29 April 2023	Capitol Theatre, Singapore	With Tay	
TayNew Fan Meeting in Taipei	7 May 2023	Zepp New Taipei, Honhui Plaza	With Tay	
24th Thai Festival: Tokyo; TayNew Special Fan Meeting	10 May 2024	Yamano Hall, Tokyo	With Tay	
TayNew Fan Meeting in Hong Kong	8 June 2024	KITEC LIVE	With Tay	
TayNew Fan Meeting in Taipei	7 September 2024	Zepp New Taipei, Honhui Plaza	With Tay	
25th Thai Festival Tokyo: TayNew Special Fan Meeting	10 May 2025	New Pier hall, Tokyo	With Tay	
TayNew & Polcasan Fan Meeting in Hong Kong	4 October 2025	Regala Skycity Hotel Grand Ballroom	With Tay	
26th Thai Festival Tokyo: TayNew Special Fan Meeting	8 May 2026	New Pier Hall, Tokyo	With Tay	
TayNew & Polcasan Family Trip in Taipei	4 October 2026	Legacy TERA, Taipei	With Tay	
Halloween Time: TayNew & Polcasan Fan Meeting in Hong Kong	31 October 2026	Regala Skycity Hotel Grand Ballroom	With Tay	
A Dog and a Plane: Love at First Flight	29 May 2026	Iconsiam Hall	With A Dog and a Plane cast	
A Dog and a Plane Final EP. Fan Meeting	31 July 2026	Centralworld Pulse Hall, Centralworld	With A Dog and a Plane cast	
GMMTV Fan Day 32 in Singapore	5 September 2026	The Theatre at Mediacorp, Singapore	With Tay	
White Christmas 2026: TayNew & Polcasan Fan Meeting in Berlin	5 December 2026	Estrel Hotel, Berlin	With Tay	
TayNew Fan Meeting in Manila	13 December 2026	Solaire North Ballroom, Solaire Resort	With Tay	
TayNew & Polcasan Family Outing in Vietnam	19 December 2026	C30 Hoa Binh Stage, Ho Chi Minh City	With Tay	

== Concerts ==
Title	Date	Venue	Notes	Ref.
Meet Greet Eat ว้าก With Sotus the series	14 January 2017	Scala Cinema, Siam Square, Bangkok	With SOTUS cast	
Y I Love U Fan Party	3 September 2017	Thunder Dome, Muang Thong Thani	With Earth, Krist, Singto, Off, Gun, Tay, Sing, Got, Amp, Gun Achi	
SOTUS: The Memories	5 May 2018	Thunder Dome, Muang Thong Thani	With SOTUS cast	
Y I Love U Fan Party 2019 next to Ha Island Y	26-27 January 2019	Thunder Dome, Muang Thong Thani	With Tay, Krist, Singto, Off, Gun, Drake, Frank, Earth, Oaujun, Fiat, Guy, Nammon, Neo, Phuwin	
SOTUS The Reunion 4ever More	22 August 2020	V LIVE	With SOTUS cast	
GMMTV Fantopia 2020	21-22 November 2020	Impact Arena, Muang Thong Thani	With Tay	
Polca the Journey; Dark Blue Kiss	25 June 2022	Chaengwattana Hall	With Tay, Pod, Gawin, AJ, Mild, Pluem, Gemini	
Love Out Loud Fan Fest 2022	20 August 2022	Impact Arena, Muang Thong Thani	With Tay, Krist, Singto, Off, Gun, Bright, Win	
The Krist Elements Concert	21-22 October 2023	Union Hall, Union Mall	With Krist, Tay, Singto, Off, Gun, Gawin	
GMMTV Starlympics 2023	23 December 2023	Impact Arena, Muang Thong Thani	GMMTV Artists	
GMMTV Starlympics 2024	21 December 2024	Impact Arena, Muang Thong Thani	GMMTV Artists	
GMMTV Fan Fest 2025: Japan	13 January 2025	Tokyo Garden Theater, Tokyo	With Tay, Krist, Singto, Off, Gun, Pond, Phuwin, Jimmy, Sea, Gemini, Fourth	
PEBACA What A Concert in Bangkok	22 March 2025	Thunder dome, Muang Thong Thank	With Tay, Krist, Singto, Off, Gun	
PEBACA What A Concert in Singapore	7 September 2025	D'Marquee Downtown East, Singapore	With Tay, Krist, Singto, Off, Gun	
PEBACA What A Concert in Japan	September 28, 2025	Toyosu PIT, Tokyo	With Tay, Krist, Singto, Off, Gun	
PEBACA What A Concert in Manila	22 November 2025	Up theater, Manila, Philippines	With Tay, Krist, Singto, Off, Gun	
GMMTV Starlympics 2025	20 December 2025	Impact Arena, Muang Thong Thani	GMMTV Artists	
GMMTV Fan Fest 2026: Japan	21 February 2026	Tokyo Garden Theater, Japan	With Tay, Krist, Singto, Off, Gun, Boun, Prem, Pond, Phuwin, Joong, Dunk, Sky, Nani	
Polca Fam Meeting	28 February 2026	Union Hall, Union Mall	With Tay, Off, Gun, Sky, Win	
Polca Fam Meeting	1 March 2026	Union Hall, Union Mall	With Tay, Off, Gun, Krist, Nanon, Gemini	
PEBACA What A Concert in Taipei	22 March 2026	Zepp New Taipei	With Tay, Krist, Singto, Off, Gun,	
SOTUS Teniversary concert	29-30 August 2026	Union Hall, Union Mall	With Krist, Singto, Neen, Gunsmile, Fluke, Off, Jan, Ice, Oat, Wawa, Prince, Amp, Gun Achi	
GMMTV Starlympics 2026	28 November 2026	Impact Arena, Muang Thong Thani	GMMTV Artists	
PEBACA Legacy Fam Concert	30–31 January 2027	BITEC LIVE	With Tay, Krist, Singto, Off, Gun, Nanon, Namtan, Gawin, Nani, JingJing, Prem, Sky, Bonnie, Phuwin	

== Awards and nominations ==
Year	Award	Category	Nominated work	Result	Ref.
2019	DONT Journal Awards 2018	Best Ensemble of 2018 คู่ ขวัญแห่งปี (Best Couple) (with Tay Tawan)	—N/a	Won	
2019	Kazz Awards	Attractive Young Man of the Year	—N/a	Won	
2020	Line TV Awards	Best Couple (with Tay Tawan)	—N/a	Nominated	
2020	Maya Awards	Best Official Soundtrack (with Tay Tawan)	—N/a	Won	
2022	Maya Awards	Charming Boy	—N/a	Nominated	
2025	Japan Expo Thailand Award	Japan Expo Actor Award	—N/a	Won	
