= Prachaya Ruangroj =

Thai actor and model (born 1994)

- ปราชญา เรืองโรจน์
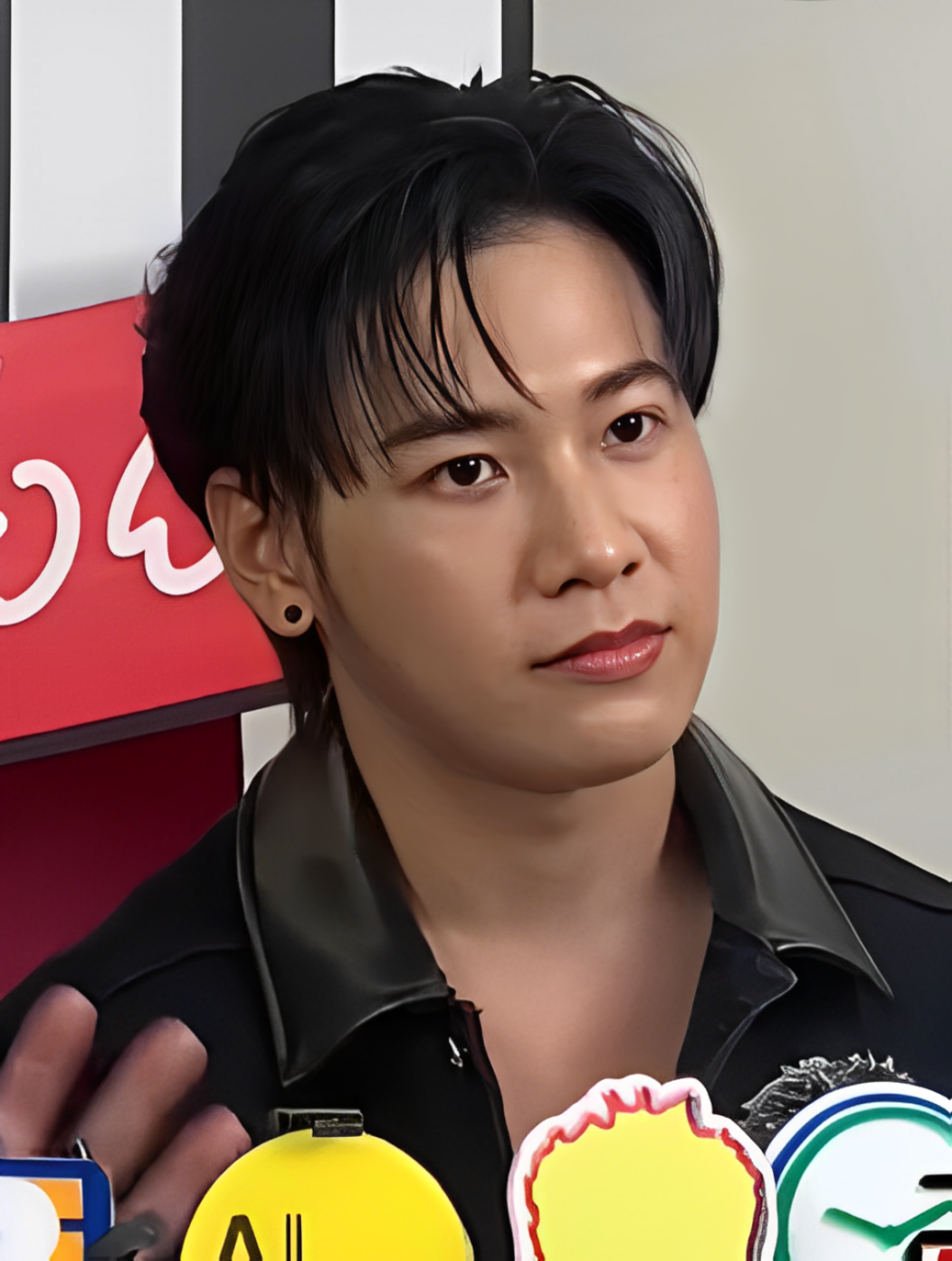
- Prachaya in May 2025
- Born: 28 July 1994 (age 32); Bangkok, Thailand
- Other name: Singto (สิงโต)
- Education: Bangkok University (BComArts)
- Occupation: Actor
- Years active: 2014
- Agent: GMMTV (2016–2021, 2024–present)
- Known for: Kongphop in SOTUS and SOTUS S; Maitee in I'm Tee, Me Too; Tamtawan in The Ex-Morning
- Height: 1.76 m (5 ft 9 in)

Prachaya Ruangroj (Thai: ปราชญา เรืองโรจน์; born 28 July 1994), nicknamed Singto (Thai: สิงโต), is a Thai actor. He is well known in Thailand for his role as Kongphop in SOTUS released in 2016. Since then, Prachaya has starred in several popular series including He's Coming to Me (2019), Turn Left Turn Right (2020), Baker Boys (2021), Paint with Love (2021), Shadow (2023) and The Ex-Morning (2025).

== Early life and education ==
Prachaya was born in Bangkok, Thailand. He graduated elementary school at Bharat Vidyalaya School. He graduated with learning science & mathematics from the Suankularb Wittayalai School and enrolled at an undergraduate program in agricultural economics at Faculty of Economics, Kasetsart University. He graduated with Bachelor of Communication Arts in Broadcasting and Streaming Media Production from Bangkok University.

== Career ==
Prachaya made his acting debut in 2016 in the Thai BL series called SOTUS where he played the lead role of Kongphop alongside Perawat Sangpotirat (Krist) who played the lead role of Arthit.

In 2017, he once again portrayed the lead role of Kongphop in its sequel SOTUS S, and in 2018, for Our Skyy.

From November 2018 to February 2019, he played the lead role of Earth in Friend Zone.

In 2019, he played the lead role of Med in He's Coming to Me alongside Pawat Chittsawangdee which earned them the "Best Dramatic Scene" award at the 2020 LINE TV Awards.

In 2020, he played the role of Maitee in I'm Tee, Me Too. He also reprises his role as Earth in Friend Zone 2: Dangerous Area.

In April 2021, his contract with GMMTV ended and he has started his own YouTube channel. However he returned to the said agency in 2024.

== Filmography ==
=== Film ===
Year	Title	Role	Notes
2015	LIE	Benz	Main role

=== Short film ===
Year	Title	Role	Notes	Network
2018	My Baby Bright: Best Friends Forever	Plathong	Main role	YouTube
2019	Baby Bright 2: Destiny Calls	Plathong	Main role	YouTube
2020	Love Stranger	Singto Thanaphat	Main role	AIS Play
2022	Baby Bright 3: Double Trouble	Agent Singto	Main role	YouTube

=== Television series ===
Key
†	Denotes television productions that have not yet been released

Year	Title	Role	Notes	Network	Ref.
2016	SOTUS	"Kong" Kongphop Suttilak	Main role	Line TV	
2016	Little Big Dream	—N/a	Guest role	One31	
2017	U-Prince: The Single Lawyer	BM	Supporting role	GMM25	
2017	Teenage Mom: The Series	—N/a	Guest role	Line TV	
2017	SOTUS S	"Kong" Kongphop Suttilak	Main role	Line TV	
2018	Happy Birthday	—N/a	Guest role	GMM25	
2018	Friend Zone	Earth	Main role	One31	
2018	Our Skyy: KongphobArthit	"Kong" Kongphop Suttilak	Main role	Line TV	
2019	He's Coming to Me	"Med" Wongsakorn Thanarunsiri	Main role	Line TV	
2020	Turn Left Turn Right	Gun	Main role	GMM25	
2020	Girl Next Room: Motorbike Baby	Tan / DJ Titan	Guest role	GMM25	
2020	Girl Next Room: Midnight Fantasy	Tan / DJ Titan	Main role	GMM25	
2020	Girl Next Room: Richy Rich	Tan / DJ Titan	Supporting role	GMM25	
2020	Girl Next Room: Security Love	Tan / DJ Titan	Guest role	GMM25	
2020	I'm Tee, Me Too	Maitee	Main role	GMM25	
2020	Friend Zone 2: Dangerous Area	Earth	Main role	GMM25	
2020	Romantic Blue: The Series	Mhen	Main role	Channel 8	
2021	Baker Boys	"Weir" Warakron Chanwanit	Main role	GMM25	
2021	Paint with Love	"Maze" Poramaze Nateenart	Main role	Channel 3	
2022	Love Connection	Tew	Main role	YouTube	
2022	Jenny A.M./P.M.	"Jen" Jenkwan Surawatchaya / "Jenny"	Main role	Channel 8	
2022	Finding The Rainbow	Win	Main role	Viu	
2023	Shadow	"Dan" Danai	Main role	Viu	
2025	My Undying Miracle	"Wat" Makkhawat	Main role	Mono Thailand	
2025	The Ex-Morning	"Tam / Tawan" Tamtawan Anandabhumi	Main role	GMM25	
2026	Good Boy	Tyler Hendricks (older)	Guest role	GMM25	
TBA	Write You Again †	Chat	Main role	TBA	
TBA	Your Eyes, My Ears †	Babe	Main role	TBA	
TBA	A Season to Remember †	TBA	Supporting role	TBA	

=== Short series ===
Year	Title	Role	Notes	Network
2021	Caring is Contagious	"Kong" Kongphop Suttilak	Main role	GMMTV

=== Music video appearances ===
Year	Title	Artist	Label	Ref.
2020	เล็กๆ บ่อยๆ; I'm Tee, Me Too OST	Gungun	GMMTV Records	
2025	"แก้ข่าว (Renew)"; The Ex-Morning OST	Krist Perawat	GMMTV Records	
2026	"ครบรอบไปด้วยกัน (Counting Till I Die)"	Krist Perawat	Riser Music	

== Discography ==
=== Albums ===
==== As featured artist ====
Year	Album	Song title	Label	Ref.
2025	Best of GMMTV Vol.1	"เสียงจากสายตา (Eye Contact)" with Krist Perawat	GMMTV Records	
2026	Best of GMMTV Vol.2	"รักก็ได้ (Morning Love)" with Krist Perawat	GMMTV Records	

=== Singles ===
==== Digital singles ====
===== Collaborations =====
Year	Song title	Label	Ref.
2017	"เธอทำให้ฉันโชคดี (You Make Me Lucky)" with Krist Perawat	GMM Grammy	
2017	"你让我幸 (My Smile)" with Krist Perawat	GMM Grammy	
2020	"ขวัญ (Gift)" with Krist Perawat	JOOX Thailand	
2020	"ตุ๊บๆ จุ๊บๆ OK!" with Krist Perawat, Off Jumpol, Gun Attaphan, Bright Vachirawit, Win Metawin	GMMTV Records	
2021	"ลืมไป" with COPTER SBFIVE	LOVEiS+	
2022	"กฎของแรงดึงดูด (The Law of Attraction)" with Krist Perawat, Off Jumpol, Gun Attaphan, Tay Tawan, New Thitipoom, Bright Vachirawit, Win Metawin	GMMTV Records	
2024	"เสียงจากสายตา (Eye Contact)" with Krist Perawat	GMMTV Records	
2025	"สิ่งที่คิด (BETTER THAN)" with Krist Perawat	GMMTV Records	

===== Soundtrack appearances =====
Year	Song title	Soundtrack	Label	Ref.
2020	"My Baby Bright" with Krist Perawat	My Baby Bright OST	?	
2021	"Sweet Day" with Lee Thanat, Pluem Purim, Foei Patara	Baker Boys OST	GMMTV Records	
2021	"เอ็นดู" with Tae Darvid	Paint With Love OST	POPS Thailand	
2025	"รักก็ได้ (Morning Love)" with Krist Perawat	The Ex-Morning OST	GMMTV Records	
2025	"ความเจ็บที่รัก (Consent)"	The Ex-Morning OST	GMMTV Records	

===== Promotional singles =====
Year	Song title	Label	Ref.
2020	"ขอเป็นคนหนึ่ง (Let Me Be The One)" with Krist Perawat, Ada Chunhavajira	Special Olympics Thailand	
2020	"Under the Same Moon" with Krist Perawat, Ada Chunhavajira	Special Olympics Thailand	

== Fan meetings ==
Solo

Title	Date	Venue	Ref.
Singto Fan Meeting in Hongkong	28 July 2019	Music Zone, KITEC	
The Summer Memory: Singto Fan Meeting in Tokyo	4 October 2024	Yamano Hall, Tokyo	
Warm Winter: Singto Fan Meeting in Shanghai	6 December 2025	Shanghai, China	
The Lion Celebrates the New Year: Singto Fan Sign in Shanghai	8 February 2026	Shanghai, China	

Joint

Title	Date	Venue	Notes	Ref.
KristSingto Fan Meeting in Hangzhou	18 February 2017	Hangzhou Magic Theatre, Hangzhou	With Krist	
At First Sight with Rookie Boys in Guangzhou	24 March 2017	Guangzhou Performing Arts Center Theater, Guangzhou	With Krist, Off, New, Gunsmile, Oaujun	
KristSingto Fan Meeting in Suzhou	22 April 2017	Suzhou Culture and Arts Centre, Suzhou	With Krist	
KristSingto Fan Meeting in Nanjing	23 April 2017	Nanjing Culture and Art Center, Nanjing	With Krist	
KristSingto Fan Meeting in Shenzhen	16 June 2017	Shenzhen Poly Theater, Shenzhen	With Krist	
KristSingto Fan Meeting in Hangzhou	17 June 2017	Hangzhou Grand Theater, Hangzhou	With Krist	
KristSingto, Off & New Fan Meeting in Chengdu	22 July 2017	Jincheng Art Palace, Chengdu	With Krist, Off, New	
SOTUS S Nation and Fan Meeting	16 December 2017	Kad Suan Kaew Shopping Center, Chiang Mai	With SOTUS S cast	
SOTUS S Nation and Fan Meeting	23 December 2017	Terminal 21 Shopping Center, Korat	With SOTUS S cast	
SOTUS S Nation and Fan Meeting	13 January 2018	Central Plaza Ladprao, Bangkok	With SOTUS S cast	
SOTUS S Hazing in Manila	20 January 2018	Pasig City Hall Complex, Manila	With SOTUS S cast	
SOTUS S Nation and Fan Meeting	27 January 2018	Hatyai Hall, Central Festival Hatyai Shopping Center	With SOTUS S cast	
SOTUS S Fan Meeting in Chengdu	17 March 2018	Zhenghuo Art Center, Chengdu	With SOTUS S cast	
SOTUS S Fan Meeting in Taipei	25 March 2018	ATT Show Box, Taipei	With SOTUS S cast	
SOTUS S Fan Meeting in Tianjin	31 March 2018	Tianjin Wuqing Theater, Tianjin	With SOTUS S cast	
KristSingto Fan Meeting in Singapore	1 July 2018	Kallang Theatre, Singapore	With Krist	
KristSingto Fan Meeting in Korea	7 July 2018	Sungshin Women's University, Woonjung Green Campus	With Krist	
SOTUS S Fan Meeting in Wuhan	14 July 2018	Wuhan Cultural Museum Center, Wuhan	With SOTUS S cast	
KristSingto Fan Meeting in Hong Kong	21-22 July 2018	KITEC LIVE	With Krist	
SOTUS S Fan Meeting in Wuxi	25 August 2018	HUALUXE Wuxi Taihu, Wuxi	With SOTUS S cast	
SOTUS: ENCORE Fan Meeting in Taipei	22 September 2018	Taipei International Convention Center	With SOTUS S cast	
KristSingto Fan Meeting in Jakarta	17 November 2018	Upperroom Jakarta	With Krist	
Lazada Presents: KristSingto Fan Meeting in Bangkok	29 November 2018	Srinakharinwirot University, Bangkok	With Krist	
KristSingto Fan Meeting in Yangon	2 December 2018	National Theatre of Yangon, Yangon	With Krist	
KristSingto Fan Meeting in Japan	15 December 2018	EBiS 303 Event Hall, Tokyo	With Krist	
KristSingto Fan Meeting in Qingdao	9 March 2019	Qingdao Mangrove Tree Resort World, Conference and Exhibition Center	With Krist	
KristSingto & TayNew Fan Meeting in Hong Kong	14 April 2019	KITEC LIVE	With Krist, Tay, New	
He's Coming to Me Fan Meeting in Taipei	11 May 2019	Dazhi Denwell	With He's Coming to Me cast	
KristSingto Fan Meeting in Vietnam	26 May 2019	GALA Center, Ho Chi Minh city	With Krist	
KristSingto Fan Meeting in Busan	22 June 2019	Dongnae Cultural Center, Busan	With Krist	
Peraya Party: KristSingto Fan Meeting in Thailand	6-7 July 2019	Chaengwatthana Hall	With Krist	
Our Skyy Fan Meeting in Taipei	21 July 2019	Taipei International Convention Center	With Krist, Off, Gun, Tay, New, Drake, Frank, Pluem, Chimon	
KristSingto Fan Meeting in Manila	17 August 2019	SM Sky Dome, SM City North EDSA	With Krist	
KristSingto Fan Meeting in Taipei	19 October 2019	ATT Show Box, Taipei	With Krist	
Our Skyy Fan Meeting in Myanmar	9 November 2019	Pullman Yangon Centrepoint Hotel, Myanmar	With Krist, Off, Gun, Tay, New, Drake, Frank, Pluem, Chimon	
KristSingto Fan Meeting in Chengdu	16 November 2019	Chengdu Overseas Chinese Town Grand Theatre	With Krist	
KristSingto Fan Meeting in Japan	21 December 2019	Nissho Hall, Tokyo	With Krist	
KristSingto Fan Meeting in Hong Kong	28 December 2019	KITEC LIVE	With Krist	
Worldwide Live Fan Meeting: KristSingto	30 May 2020	V LIVE	With Krist	
The Precious Memories: KristSingto Fan Meeting in Japan	17 December 2022	Yokohama Hall, Tokyo	With Krist	
KristSingto Fan Meeting in Macau	14 July 2024	JW Marriot Grand Ball Room, Macau	With Krist	
GMMTV Fan Day 14 in Vietnam	10 August 2024	Ben Thanh theater, Ho Chi Minh city	With Krist	
GMMTV Fan Day 15 in Singapore	19 October 2024	GV Max Vivocity, Singapore	With Krist	
GMMTV Fan Day 16 in Cambodia	25-26 January 2025	Aeon Mall, Sensok City	With Krist	
25th Thai Festival Tokyo: KristSingto Special Fan Meeting	8 May 2025	New Pier hall, Tokyo	With Krist	
The First Ex-Morning	23 May 2025	Siam Pavalai Paragon Cineplex	With The Ex-Morning cast	
The Ex-Morning Final EP. Fan Meeting	24 July 2025	Siam Pavalai Paragon Cineplex	With The Ex-Morning cast	
KristSingto Fan Meeting in Taipei	30 August 2025	WESTAR	With Krist	
GMMTV Fan Day 25 in USA	14 September 2025	Alex Theatre, Los Angeles	With Krist	
AGAin 2015 - 10 Years Together: KristSingto Fan Meeting in Seoul	25 October 2025	Yoodang Art Hall, Seoul	With Krist	
KristSingto Fan Meeting in Berlin	9 November 2025	Estrel Hotel, Berlin	With Krist	
26th Thai Festival Tokyo: KristSingto Special Fan Meeting	9 May 2026	New Pier Hall, Tokyo	With Krist	

== Concerts ==
Title	Date	Venue	Notes	Ref.
Meet Greet Eat ว้าก With Sotus the series	14 January 2017	Scala Cinema, Siam Square, Bangkok	With SOTUS cast	
Y I Love U Fan Party	3 September 2017	Thunder Dome, Muang Thong Thani	With Krist, Off, Gun, Earth, New, Sing, Tay, Got, Amp, Gun Achi	
SOTUS: The Memories	5 May 2018	Thunder Dome, Muang Thong Thani	With SOTUS cast	
Y I Love U Fan Party 2019 next to Ha Island Y	26-27 January 2019	Thunder Dome, Muang Thong Thani	With Krist, Off, Gun, Tay, New, Drake, Frank, Earth, Oaujun, Fiat, Guy, Nammon, Neo, Phuwin	
SOTUS The Reunion 4ever More	22 August 2020	V LIVE	With SOTUS cast	
GMMTV Fantopia 2020	21-22 November 2020	Impact Arena, Muang Thong Thani	With Krist	
Love Out Loud Fan Fest 2022	20 August 2022	Impact Arena, Muang Thong Thani	With Krist, Off, Gun, Tay, New, Bright, Win	
The Krist Elements Concert	21-22 October 2023	Union Hall, Union Mall	With Krist, Off, Gun, Tay, New, Gawin	
Peraya Party Begin Again	15 June 2024	Union Hall, Union Mall	With Krist	
GMMTV Starlympics 2024	21 December 2024	Impact Arena, Muang Thong Thani	GMMTV Artists	
GMMTV Fan Fest 2025: Japan	13 January 2025	Tokyo Garden Theater, Tokyo	With Krist, Off, Gun, Tay, New, Pond, Phuwin, Jimmy, Sea, Gemini, Fourth	
PEBACA What A Concert in Bangkok	22 March 2025	Thunder dome, Muang Thong Thank	With Krist, Off, Gun, Tay, New	
PEBACA What A Concert in Singapore	7 September 2025	D'Marquee Downtown East, Singapore	With Krist, Off, Gun, Tay, New	
PEBACA What A Concert in Japan	September 28, 2025	Toyosu PIT, Tokyo	With Krist, Off, Gun, Tay, New	
PEBACA What A Concert in Manila	22 November 2025	Up theater, Manila, Philippines	With Krist, Off, Gun, Tay, New	
GMMTV Starlympics 2025	20 December 2025	Impact Arena, Muang Thong Thani	GMMTV Artists	
GMMTV Fan Fest 2026: Japan	21 February 2026	Tokyo Garden Theater, Japan	With Krist, Off, Gun, Tay, New, Boun, Prem, Pond, Phuwin, Joong, Dunk, Sky, Nani	
Toey Fair Festival Carnival 2026	3 March 2026	Union Hall, Union Mall	With Godji, Pompam, Jennie, Golf, Namtan	
PEBACA What A Concert in Taipei	22 March 2026	Zepp New Taipei	With Krist, Off, Gun, Tay, New	
JossGawin Heat & Beat Concert	28 July 2026	Union Hall, Union Mall	With Joss, Gawin, Krist, Lego and FLIO	
SOTUS Teniversary concert	29-30 August 2026	Union Hall, Union Mall	With Krist, New, Neen, Gunsmile, Fluke, Off, Jan, Ice, Oat, Wawa, Prince, Amp, Gun Achi	
GMMTV Starlympics 2026	28 November 2026	Impact Arena, Muang Thong Thani	GMMTV Artists	
PEBACA Legacy Fam Concert	30–31 January 2027	BITEC LIVE	With Krist, Off, Gun, Tay, New, Nanon, Namtan, Gawin, Nani, JingJing, Prem, Sky, Bonnie, Phuwin	

== Awards and nomination ==
Year	Award	Category	Nominated work	Result	Ref.
2017	2nd World Top Awards	Person of the Year	—N/a	Won	
2017	Attitude Award 6th Anniversary	The Most Favorite TV Series of the Year Most Favorite couple of the year with Krist Perawat	SOTUS	Won	
2017	5th YinYueTai V Chart Awards	Recommended Artist Of YinYueTai	SOTUS	Won	
2017	5th YinYueTai V Chart Awards	Most Popular New Artist	SOTUS	Won	
2017	Influence Asia 2017	Breakout Influencers	—N/a	Nominated	
2017	11th Kazz Awards	Imaginary Couple of the Year with Krist Perawat	SOTUS	Nominated	
2017	11th Kazz Awards	Most Popular New Actor	SOTUS	Nominated	
2017	11th Kazz Awards	Kazz Magazine's Favorite Star – Male	—N/a	Won	
2017	14th Kom Chad Luek Awards	Most Popular Actor	SOTUS	Won	
2017	3rd Maya Awards	Best Couple with Krist Perawat	SOTUS	Won	
2017	3rd Maya Awards	Male Rising Star	SOTUS	Won	
2018	GREAT STARS Digital Social Super Star Of The Year	Social Super Star of the Year – Couple with Krist Perawat	SOTUS S	Won	
2018	LINE TV Awards	Best Couple with Krist Perawat	SOTUS S	Won	
2018	Sanook! Top Vote of the Year	Best Couple with Krist Perawat	SOTUS S	Won	
2018	9th Awarding Ceremony to Artists, Entertainment Stars, and Social Media Collaborating in the Smoking Cessation Program	Male Rising Star	—N/a	Won	
2018	Attitude Award 7th Anniversary	The Most Favorite TV Series of the Year Most Favorite couple of the year with Krist Perawat	SOTUS S	Won	
2018	5th Thailand Role Model Awards	Best Actor	—N/a	Won	
2018	12th Kazz Awards	Most Popular Teen Actor – Male	SOTUS S	Won	
2018	12th Kazz Awards	Imaginary Couple of the Year with Krist Perawat	SOTUS S	Won	
2018	11th Nine Entertain Awards	Public Favorite	—N/a	Nominated	
2018	10th Siam Dara Stars Awards 2018	Male Rising Star	SOTUS S	Nominated	
2018	4th Maya Awards	Best Couple with Krist Perawat	SOTUS S	Won	
2018	4th Maya Awards	Male Rising Star	SOTUS S	Won	
2018	Sri-Ganesuan Awards Ganesh Chaturthi 2018	The Artist of Sri-Ganesuan award for well-promoting and propagating art and culture	—N/a	Won	
2018	ET Thailand Awards of September	Most Social Influencer	—N/a	Nominated	
2018	6th Thailand Headlines Person of The Year Awards 2018	Culture and Entertainment - Most Contributing Enhancement and Chinese followed person with Krist Perawat	—N/a	Won	
2018	12th OK! Awards	Shipped Couple with Krist Perawat	SOTUS S	Won	
2018	Great Stars Social Awards 2018	Superstar - Shipped Couple of the Year with Krist Perawat	—N/a	Won	
2019	Line Sticker Awards 2019	Best Couple with Krist Perawat	—N/a	Won	
2019	13th Kazz Awards	Imanginary Couple of the Year with Krist Perawat	—N/a	Won	
2019	15th Kom Chad Luek Awards	Most Popular Actor	SOTUS S	Won	
2019	15th Kom Chad Luek Awards	Most Popular Thai Series	SOTUS S	Won	
2019	8th Daradaily Awards	Cool Guy of the Year 2018	—N/a	Won	
2019	5th Maya Awards	Charming Boy	—N/a	Won	
2019	1st Zoomdara New Year Awards 2019	Best Couple with Krist Perawat	—N/a	Won	
2020	LINE TV Awards	Best Dramatic Scene with Ohm Pawat	He's Coming to Me	Won	
2020	14th Kazz Awards	Couple of the Year with Krist Perawat	—N/a	Won	
2020	14th Kazz Awards	Popular Young Actor	—N/a	Won	
2020	14th Kazz Awards	Popular Man 2020	—N/a	Won	
2020	6th Maya Awards	Male Star	Turn Left Turn Right	Nominated	
2021	15th Kazz Awards	Top Actor Award	—N/a	Nominated	
2021	13rd Zoomdara Awards	Popular single with Krist Perawat	Under the Same Moon	Won	
2021	13rd Zoomdara Awards	Popular Couple with Tae Darvid	Paint with love	Nominated	
2022	18th Kom Chad Leuk Awards	Popular Couple with Krist Perawat	—N/a	Nominated	
2023	Japan Expo Thailand Award 2023	Japan Expo Artist Award	—N/a	Won	
2024	Nataraja Awards 2024	Best Leading Actor (Online Short Form Dramas)	Shadow	Nominated	
2024	8th Thailand Headlines Person of the Year Awards	Top influential social media person of the year award - Culture and Entertainment – Actor with Krist Perawat	SOTUS	Won	
2024	Y Universe Awards 2024	The Best Coming Soon	The Ex-Morning	Nominated	
2025	Maya Awards	Male couple of the Year with Krist Perawat	The Ex-Morning	Nominated	
2025	Y universe Awards 2025	Y iconic star	The Ex-Morning	Nominated	
