= Tawan Vihokratana =

Thai actor, model and host (born 1991)

- ตะวัน วิหครัตน์
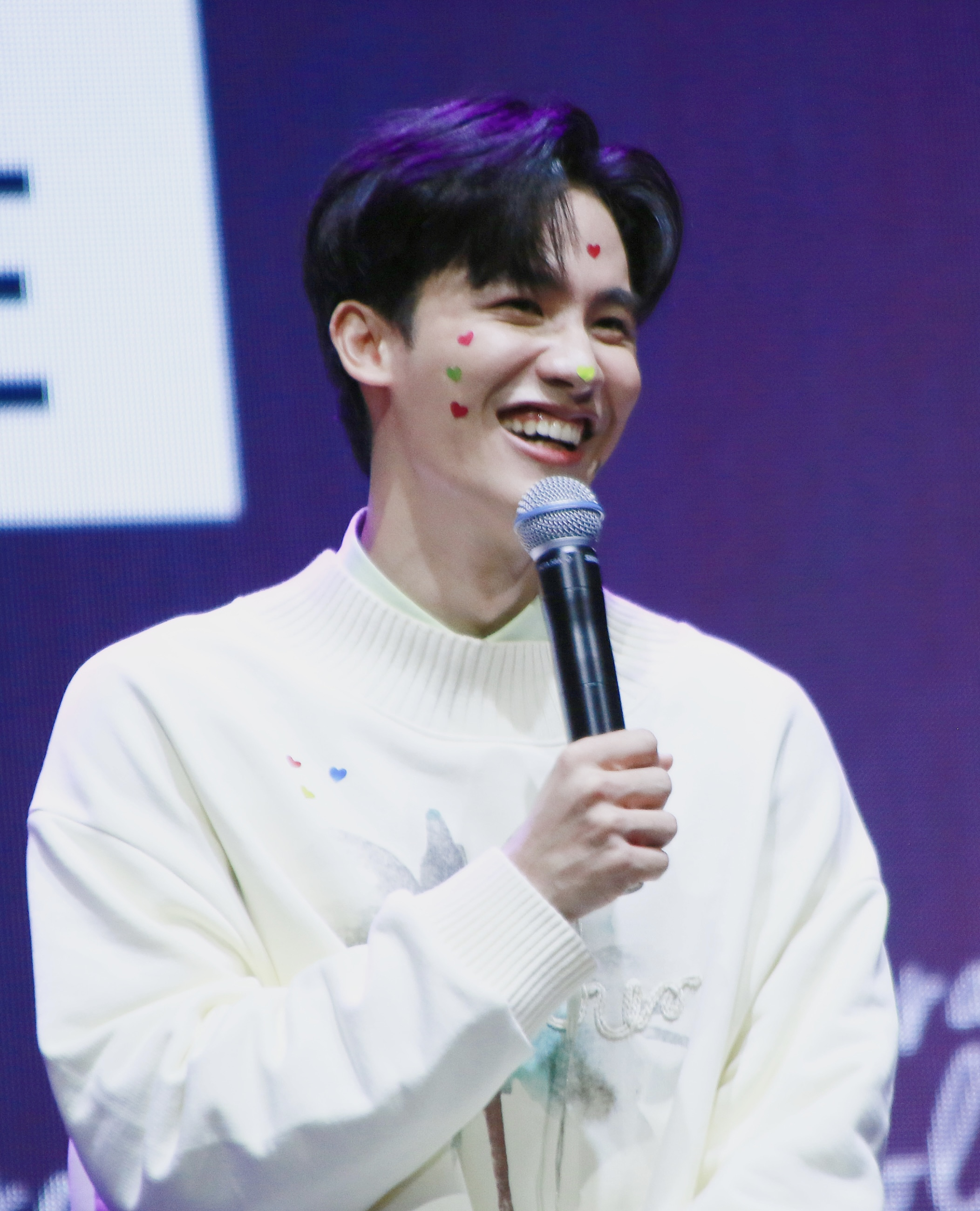
- Tawan in June 2023
- Born: 20 July 1991 (age 35); Bangkok, Thailand
- Other names: Tawan Wihokrat, Te
- Education: Chulalongkorn University, Faculty of Economics, (B.A.)
- Occupations: Actor, Host
- Years active: 2012–present
- Agent: GMMTV (2012-present)
- Known for: Warm in Room Alone 401–410 and Room Alone 2; Pete in Kiss, Kiss Me Again and Dark Blue Kiss; Tee-Do in I'm Tee, Me Too; Karan in Cherry Magic; Peach in Peaceful Property; Toto in A Dog and a Plane

Tawan Vihokratana (Thai: ตะวัน วิหครัตน์; born 20 July 1991), nicknamed Tay (Thai: เต), is a Thai actor, television host based in Bangkok. A graduate of Chulalongkorn University, Tawan began his career in entertainment as a host on Bang Channel’s Five Live Fresh in 2014. That same year, he made his television acting debut in Room Alone 401-410 and gained notable recognition after being named one of Cleo Thailand’s 50 Most Eligible Bachelors of 2014. He is best known for Kiss: The Series (2016), Kiss Me Again (2018), and Dark Blue Kiss (2019). In 2023, he starred as Karan in the Thai adaptation of the Japanese manga Cherry Magic.

== Early life and education ==
Tawan was born in Bangkok, Thailand. Focusing on science and mathematics, he completed his high school education at Suankularb Wittayalai School. He initially took up a bachelor's degree in chemistry from the Faculty of Science at Chulalongkorn University (CU) but decided to shift and take up instead a bachelor's degree in economics from the Faculty of Economics at the same school. He was selected to be one of the school's Generation 5 mace-bearers for the 68th Chula–Thammasat Traditional Football Match in 2012 which included future actors Pat Chatborirak and Pakorn Thanasrivanitchai.

== Career ==
He was introduced in 2014 as one of the six new hosts of Five Live Fresh, a youth-oriented music television program of the now-defunct Bang Channel. Among his fellow hosts were Thitipoom Techaapaikhun and Jumpol Adulkittiporn.

He made his television debut in the same year with Room Alone 401-410 where he played a supporting role as Warm. He also became part of Ugly Duckling: Don't (2015). In 2016, he got a supporting role in U-Prince:The Foxy Pilot (2016) and Kiss: The Series (2016) where he played the role of Pete.

In 2017, he starred in the main role as Alan in the drama series Secret Seven: The Series. He later became known for his main role as Pete in Kiss Me Again (2018) and Dark Blue Kiss (2019). He also played the role of Shin in 3 Will Be Free (2019). He also hosted the food web series TayNew Meal Date along with Thitipoom Techaapaikhun.

In 2020, he joined the cast I'm Tee, Me Too as Teedo and had a guest role in The Gifted: Graduation. He is also one of the hosts of Friend Club together with Jumpol Adulkittiporn and Weerayut Chansook. He's the current host of his own lifestyle/talk show, Krahai Lao. In 2021, he starred as Tin in The Player. In November 2022, GMMTV announced that he along with his co-star Thitipoom Techaapaikhun, would be the main casts of the agency's adaptation of Cherry Magic (2023).

== Personal life ==
On 29 June 2017, he was ordained at the Wat Bowonniwet Vihara.

=== Other ventures ===
Outside his acting career, Tawan co-owns a spa called Bamboo Secrets along with Thitipoom Techaapaikhun.

=== Politics ===
Tawan has supported the 2020–2021 Thai protests and opposed the use of violence in the 2020 Pathumwan dispersal, while also fiercely criticizing politics, both the situation of the people's protests, the situation during the COVID-19 pandemic in Thailand, and the situation after the 2023 Thai general election.

== Filmography ==
=== Television series ===
Key
†	Denotes television productions that have not yet been released

Year	Title	Role	Notes	Ref.
2012	Live Love Korn Is	1	Supporting role	
2014	Room Alone 401-410	Warm	Supporting role	
2015	Ugly Duckling: Don't	Ter	Guest role	
2015	Room Alone 2	Warm	Supporting role	
2016	Kiss: The Series	"Pete" Phubodin Rachatraku	Supporting role	
2016	Lovey Dovey	Dew	Supporting role	
2016	U-Prince: The Foxy Pilot	Phillip	Supporting role	
2016	Little Big Dream	—N/a	Guest role	
2017	Secret Seven	Alan	Main role	
2018	Kiss Me Again	"Pete" Phubodin Rachatraku	Main role	
2018	Rai Sanaeha	Anukhom (Aom)	Supporting role	
2018	Our Skyy	"Pete" Phubodin Rachatraku	Main role	
2019	Dark Blue Kiss	"Pete" Phubodin Rachatraku	Main role	
2019	3 Will Be Free	Shin	Main role	
2020	Club Sapan Fine	Pae	Supporting role	
2020	The Gifted: Graduation	Yuth / Supot (young)	Main role	
2020	I'm Tee, Me Too	Tee-Do	Main role	
2020	The Blood of Bridal House: Season 2	Korn	Main role	
2021	Angkhan Khlumpong	Tee	Main role	
2021	Girl2K	Matt	Guest role	
2021	Remember You	Paytai / Meena	Main role	
2021	The Player	Tin	Main role	
2022	The Three GentleBros	"Thames" Thevis Chattra	Main role	
2022	Good Old Days: Story 2: Memory of Happiness	Jap	Main role	
2023	Tannam	"Tonbun" Jaijongdee / "Pi" Patthamalikhit	Main role	
2023	Midnight Museum	Boon	Supporting role	
2023	Cherry Magic	"Karan" Wongkarun	Main role	
2024	Peaceful Property	"Peach" Santiphap Tantitaymitr	Main role	
2024	Perfect 10 Liners	Tawan	Guest role	
2025	Break Up Service	Oat	Supporting role	
2026	A Dog and a Plane	"Toto" Phanuphong Khomklao	Main role	
2026	Peach and Me	Himself	Guest role	
2026	Good Boy	"Ruth" Atiwitch Rattanawatthana (older)	Guest role	
2026	Scarlet Heart Ullavee	Indraraja, Viceroy prince	Supporting role	
TBA	Pineapple Leaf Blade †	Piya	Main role	
TBA	Boys 4 Moms †	Mil	Main role	
TBA	High & Low: Born to Be High †	Tui	TBA	

=== Television shows ===
Year	Title	Notes	Ref.
2014	Five Live Fresh	Main host	
2018	School Rangers	Main host	
2018	TayNew Meal Date	Main host	
2018	Tred Tray Fest with Tay Tawan	Main host	
2019	Sanae Hong Krueng	Main host	
2020	Hungry Sister	Main host	
2020	Friend Club	Main host	
2021	Krahai Lao	Main host	

== Discography ==
=== Singles ===
==== Collaborations ====
Year	Title	Label	Ref.
2014	"รักของฉันนั้นคือเธอ - ต้นฉบับศิลปิน THE STAR" with Five Live	Five Live	
2020	"เสื้อกันหนาว (Sweater)" with Lula Kanyarat	White Music	
2022	"กฎของแรงดึงดูด (The Law of Attraction)" with New Thitipoom, Krist Perawat, Singto Prachaya, Off Jumpol, Gun Atthaphan, Bright Vachirawit, Win Metawin	GMMTV Records	
2023	"กอด กอด (Hugs)" with New Thitipoom, Off Jumpol, Gun Atthaphan, Pond Naravit, Phuwin Tangsakyuen, Gemini Norawit, Fourth Nattawat, Perth Tanpon, Chimon Wachirawit	GMMTV Records	
2025	"ชอบแบบนี้ (NO MORE)" with New Thitipoom	GMMTV Records	
2025	"เติมรักอีกนิด (A Little More Love)" with New Thitipoom	GMMTV Records	

==== Soundtrack appearances ====
Year	Title	Soundtrack	Label	Ref.
2019	"ไม่มีนิยาม (No Definition)" (with New Thitipoom)	Dark Blue Kiss OST	GMMTV Records	
2022	"ยินดีที่รู้ใจ (Enchanté)"	Enchanté OST	GMMTV Records	
2023	"แอบตะโกน (Loudest Love)" (with New Thitipoom)	Cherry Magic OST	GMMTV Records	
2023	"ถ้าเธอได้ยิน (Voice Within)"	Cherry Magic OST	GMMTV Records	
2024	"ผีหยอก (Haunted House)" (with New Thitipoom)	Peaceful Property OST	GMMTV Records	
2026	"กู้ภัยกู้ใจ (Rescue You)"	A Dog and a Plane OST	GMMTV Records	
2026	"รักไม่มีเหตุผล (No Reason)" (with New Thitipoom)	A Dog and a Plane OST	GMMTV Records	

==== Album appearances ====
Year	Album	Song title	Label	Ref.
2021	Boys Don't Cry	"เก็บความรู้สึกเก่ง (Invisible Tears)"	GMMTV Records	

== Fan meetings ==
Solo

Title	Date	Venue	Ref.
GMMTV Fan Day 5 in Indonesia	1 July 2023	Studio 1, Epicentrum XXI	
Chasing Light, Chasing Love: Tay Fan Meeting in Nanning	19 October 2024	Nanning, China	
PolcaFam: Tay & Polcasan Fan Meeting in Hangzhou	16 August 2025	Hangzhou, China	
A Moment of Summer Light with Polca Family: Tay & Polcasan Fan Sign in Shanghai	2 May 2026	Shanghai, China	

Joint

Title	Date	Venue	Notes	Ref.
At First Sight with Rookie Boys in Guangzhou	24 Mar 2017	Guangzhou Performing Arts Center Theater, Guangzhou	With New, Off, Singto, Gunsmile, Oaujun	
KristSingto, Off & New Fan Meeting in Chengdu	22 Jul 2017	Jincheng Art Palace, Chengdu	With New, Off, Singto	
TayNew & Earth Fan Meeting in Manila	22 December 2018	TIU Theater, Manila	With New, Earth	
KristSingto & TayNew Fan Meeting in Hong Kong	14 Apr 2019	KITEC LIVE	With New, Krist, Singto	
TayNew Fan Meeting in Korea	11 May 2019	Howon Art Hall, Korea	With New	
Our Skyy Fan Meeting in Taipei	21 Jul 2019	Taipei International Convention Center	With New, Krist, Singto, Off, Gun, Drake, Frank, Pluem, Chimon	
TayNew & PluemChimon Fan Meeting in Myanmar	3 August 2019	Pullman Yangon Centrepoint Hotel	With New, Pluem, Chimon	
TayNew Fan Meeting in Guangzhou	10 August 2019	Nanfang Theatre, Guangzhou	With New	
Our Skyy Fan Meeting in Myanmar	9 Nov 2019	Pullman Yangon Centrepoint Hotel, Myanmar	With New, Krist, Singto, Off, Gun, Drake, Frank, Pluem, Chimon	
TayNew Fan Meeting in Chengdu	30 November 2019	Chengdu Rising Butterfly Hotel	With New	
Dark Blue Kiss: TayNew Fan Meeting in Taipei	21 December 2019	WESTAR	With New	
Worldwide Live Fan Meeting: TayNew	13 June 2020	V LIVE	With New	
Polca The Journey: TayNew Fan Meeting in Thailand	25 June 2022	Changwattana Hall, Central Chaengwattana	With New	
TayNew Fan Meeting in Manila	30 July 2022	The Theatre at Solaire, Solaire Resort & Casino	With New	
TayNew Fan Meeting in Korea	15 October 2022	Yearimdang Art Hall, Korea	With New	
TayNew Fan Meeting in Osaka	27 November 2022	Dojima River Forum, Hotarumachi	With New	
TayNew Fan Meeting in Hong Kong	2 April 2023	Kerry Hotel, Hong Kong	With New	
TayNew Fan Meeting in Singapore	29 April 2023	Capitol Theatre, Singapore	With New	
TayNew Fan Meeting in Taipei	7 May 2023	Zepp New Taipei, Honhui Plaza	With New	
24th Thai Festival: Tokyo; TayNew Special Fan Meeting	10 May 2024	Yamano Hall, Tokyo	With New	
TayNew Fan Meeting in Hong Kong	8 June 2024	KITEC LIVE	With New	
TayNew Fan Meeting in Taipei	7 September 2024	Zepp New Taipei, Honhui Plaza	With New	
25th Thai Festival Tokyo: TayNew Special Fan Meeting	10 May 2025	New Pier hall, Tokyo	With New	
TayNew & Polcasan Fan Meeting in Hong Kong	4 October 2025	Regala Skycity Hotel Grand Ballroom	With New	
26th Thai Festival Tokyo: TayNew Special Fan Meeting	8 May 2026	New Pier Hall, Tokyo	With New	
TayNew & Polcasan Family Trip in Taipei	4 October 2026	Legacy TERA, Taipei	With New	
Halloween Time: TayNew & Polcasan Fan Meeting in Hong Kong	31 October 2026	Regala Skycity Hotel Grand Ballroom	With New	
A Dog and a Plane: Love at First Flight	29 May 2026	Iconsiam Hall	With A Dog and a Plane cast	
A Dog and a Plane Final EP. Fan Meeting	31 July 2026	Centralworld Pulse Hall, Centralworld	With A Dog and a Plane cast	
GMMTV Fan Day 32 in Singapore	5 September 2026	The Theatre at Mediacorp, Singapore	With New	
Scarlet Heart Ullavee: The Grand Premiere	4 November 2026	Union Hall, Union Mall	With Scarlet Heart Ullavee cast	
White Christmas 2026: TayNew & Polcasan Fan Meeting in Berlin	5 December 2026	Estrel Hotel, Berlin	With New	
TayNew Fan Meeting in Manila	13 December 2026	Solaire North Ballroom, Solaire Resort	With New	
TayNew & Polcasan Family Outing in Vietnam	19 December 2026	C30 Hoa Binh Stage, Ho Chi Minh City	With New	

== Concerts ==
Title	Date	Venue	Notes	Ref.
Y I Love U Fan Party	3 September 2017	Thunder Dome, Muang Thong Thani	With Krist, Singto, Off, Gun, Earth, New, Sing, Got, Amp, Gun Achi	
Y I Love U Fan Party 2019 next to Ha Island Y	26-27 January 2019	Thunder Dome, Muang Thong Thani	With New, Krist, Singto, Off, Gun, Drake, Frank, Earth, Oaujun, Fiat, Guy, Nammon, Neo, Phuwin	
GMMTV Fantopia 2020	21-22 November 2020	Impact Arena, Muang Thong Thani	With New	
Polca the Journey; Dark Blue Kiss	25 June 2022	Chaengwattana Hall	With New, Pod, Gawin, AJ, Mild, Pluem, Gemini	
Love Out Loud Fan Fest 2022	20 August 2022	Impact Arena, Muang Thong Thani	With New, Krist, Singto, Off, Gun, Bright, Win	
The Krist Elements Concert	21-22 October 2023	Union Hall, Union Mall	With Krist, New, Singto, Off, Gun, Gawin	
GMMTV Starlympics 2023	23 December 2023	Impact Arena, Muang Thong Thani	GMMTV Artists	
GMMTV Starlympics 2024	21 December 202	Impact Arena, Muang Thong Thani	GMMTV Artists	
GMMTV Fan Fest 2025: Japan	13 January 2025	Tokyo Garden Theater, Tokyo	With New, Krist, Singto, Off, Gun, Pond, Phuwin, Jimmy, Sea, Gemini, Fourth	
PEBACA What A Concert in Bangkok	22 March 2025	Thunder dome, Muang Thong Thank	With New, Krist, Singto, Off, Gun	
PEBACA What A Concert in Singapore	7 September 2025	D'Marquee Downtown East, Singapore	With New, Krist, Singto, Off, Gun	
PEBACA What A Concert in Japan	September 28, 2025	Toyosu PIT, Tokyo	With New, Krist, Singto, Off, Gun	
PEBACA What A Concert in Manila	22 November 2025	Up theater, Manila, Philippines	With New, Krist, Singto, Off, Gun	
JimmySea Dreamscape Fancon	30 November 2025	Union Hall, Union Mall	With Jimmy, Sea, Gawin, Junior, Book	
GMMTV Starlympics 2025	20 December 2025	Impact Arena, Muang Thong Thani	GMMTV Artists	
GMMTV Fan Fest 2026: Japan	21 February 2026	Tokyo Garden Theater, Japan	With New, Krist, Singto, Off, Gun, Boun, Prem, Pond, Phuwin, Joong, Dunk, Sky, Nani	
Polca Fam Meeting	28 February 2026	Union Hall, Union Mall	With New, Off, Gun, Sky, Win	
Polca Fam Meeting	1 March 2026	Union Hall, Union Mall	With New, Off, Gun, Krist, Nanon, Gemini	
PEBACA What A Concert in Taipei	22 March 2026	Zepp New Taipei	With New, Krist, Singto, Off, Gun,	
GMMTV Starlympics 2026	28 November 2026	Impact Arena, Muang Thong Thani	GMMTV Artists	
PEBACA Legacy Fam Concert	30–31 January 2027	BITEC LIVE	With New, Krist, Singto, Off, Gun, Nanon, Namtan, Gawin, Nani, JingJing, Prem, Sky, Bonnie, Phuwin	

== Awards and nominations ==
Year	Award	Category	Nominated work	Result	Ref.
2019	Buddhist Diplomacy Award	Makha Bucha Day Ambassador †	—N/a	Won	
2019	Khon Dee Sri Siam Award	Exemplary Model	—N/a	Won	
2019	DONT Journal Awards 2018	Best Ensemble of 2018 (Best Couple) (with New Thitipoom)	Dark Blue Kiss	Won	
2019	Kazz Awards	Attractive Young Man of the Year	—N/a	Won	
2020	Line TV Awards	Best Couple (with New Thitipoom)	Dark Blue Kiss	Nominated	
2020	Maya Awards	Best Official Soundtrack (with New Thitipoom)	"ไม่มีนิยาม (No Definition)"	Won	
2021	Kazz Awards	Favorite's Kazz Magazine	—N/a	Won	
2025	Japan Expo Thailand Award	Japan Expo Actor Award	—N/a	Won	
