= Love Beyond Frontier (2019 TV series) =

2019 Thai television series

- Official series poster
- Thai: Love Beyond Frontier – อุบัติรักข้ามขอบฟ้า
- Genre: Romantic comedy; Drama
- Created by: GMMTV
- Directed by: Worrawech Danuwong
- Starring: Perawat Sangpotirat; Tipnaree Weerawatnodom; Thitipoom Techaapaikhun; Methika Jiranorraphat
- Country of origin: Thailand
- Original language: Thai
- No. of episodes: 13

Production
- Editor: Parbdee Tawesuk
- Running time: 45 minutes
- Production companies: GMMTV; Lasercat Studio

Original release
- Network: GMM 25; LINE TV
- Release: 12 May – 4 August 2019

Related
- Love Beyond Frontier; Love Beyond Frontier 2

Love Beyond Frontier (Thai: Love Beyond Frontier – อุบัติรักข้ามขอบฟ้า; Love Beyond Frontier – Ubat Rak Kham Khop Fa) is a 2019 Thai television series remake of the 2008 lakorn with the same title, Love Beyond Frontier, starring Perawat Sangpotirat (Krist), Tipnaree Weerawatnodom (Namtan), Thitipoom Techaapaikhun (New) and Methika Jiranorraphat (Jane).

Directed by Worrawech Danuwong and produced by GMMTV together with Lasercat Studio, the series was one of the thirteen television series for 2019 launched by GMMTV in their "Wonder Th13teen" event on 5 November 2018. It premiered on GMM 25 and LINE TV on 12 May 2019, airing on Sundays at 20:10 ICT and 22:00 ICT, respectively. The series concluded on 4 August 2019.

== Cast and characters ==
Below are the cast of the series:

=== Main ===
- Perawat Sangpotirat (Krist) as Wang
- Tipnaree Weerawatnodom (Namtan) as Pat
- Thitipoom Techaapaikhun (New) as Win
- Methika Jiranorraphat (Jane) as Ple

=== Supporting ===
- Penpak Sirikul (Tai) as Rose
- Apasiri Nitibhon (Um) as Pa
- Leo Saussay as Phu
- Jirawat Wachirasarunpat (Wo) as Bo
- Nachat Juntapun (Nicky) as an agent
- Praeploy Oree as a nurse
- Sumet Ong as Chuang, Pat's father

== Soundtrack ==
Song title	Romanized title	Artist	Ref.
ยิ่งรักยิ่งเจ็บ	Ying Rak Ying Jaeb	Perawat Sangpotirat (Krist)	
