= SOTUS (TV series) =

2016–17 Thai television series

- Official series poster
- Also known as: SOTUS: The Series
- Thai: SOTUS: The Series – พี่ว้ากตัวร้ายกับนายปีหนึ่ง
- Genre: Boys' love; Romantic comedy; Drama
- Created by: GMMTV
- Based on: SOTUS: พี่ว้ากตัวร้ายกับนายปีหนึ่ง by BitterSweet
- Written by: Lit Samajarn
- Directed by: Lit Samajarn
- Starring: Perawat Sangpotirat; Prachaya Ruangroj
- Opening theme: "โซซัดโซเซ" (So Sud So Say) by Tachaya Prathumwan
- Ending theme: "ความลับในใจ" (Kwarm Lup Nai Jai) by Achirawich Saliwattana and Phurikulkrit Chusakdiskulwibul
- Country of origin: Thailand
- Original language: Thai
- No. of episodes: 15 + 1 special

Production
- Producer: Felloww
- Running time: 50 minutes
- Production companies: GMMTV; Felloww

Original release
- Network: One31; LINE TV; GMM 25 (Rerun)
- Release: 20 August 2016 – 14 January 2017

Related
- SOTUS S; Our Skyy

SOTUS (Thai: SOTUS: The Series – พี่ว้ากตัวร้ายกับนายปีหนึ่ง; SOTUS: The Series – Phi Wak Tua-rai Kap Nai Pi Nueng, lit. SOTUS: The Series – The Evil Senior and Mr. Freshman) is a 2016–2017 Thai boys' love television series starring Perawat Sangpotirat (Krist) and Prachaya Ruangroj (Singto). It is an adaptation of the novel of the same name by Bittersweet. Directed by Lit Samajarn and produced by GMMTV together with Felloww, the series premiered on One31 and LINE TV on 20 August 2016, airing on Saturdays at 22:00 ICT and 24:00 ICT, respectively. The first eight episodes aired between 20 August 2016 and 8 October 2016. After the passing of Thai King Bhumibol Adulyadej, the series was ordered to stop airing during the 30-day official mourning period. The remaining eight episodes were eventually shown between 19 November 2016 and 7 January 2017. On 14 January 2017, a special episode aired entitled SOTUS: Very Special EP.

A sequel titled SOTUS S aired in 2017–2018, with both Perawat and Prachaya reprising their roles and was followed by the spin-off Our Skyy (2018).

== Synopsis ==
The "Gear" – or cogwheel – is the symbol of the Faculty of Engineering. It is part of a system of cogwheels which power and run a device (e.g. a clock). If one gear fails, the device stops working. Wearing the "Gear" symbol signifies being a student of the Faculty of Engineering. However, in order to get one, all engineering freshmen must first undergo the S.O.T.U.S. (acronym for Seniority, Order, Tradition, Unity, and Spirit) system. Third year senior student Arthit (Perawat Sangpotirat) is the head hazer who leads the hazing team in disciplining the freshmen students by following the code of the S.O.T.U.S system. His methods were misunderstood by the students as a form of abusing his power as head hazer when in fact all he wanted is for the freshmen to get to know their seniors, rely on them when they need to and vice versa. (Note: In the beginning of each episode, there is a notice that says that the "hazing" activities depicted in the series have been exaggerated for entertainment purposes.) The freshmen students felt they are powerless to complain or resist any orders given to them by their seniors. Arthit was seemingly unstoppable, until Kongphop (Prachaya Ruangroj) stood up against him. This initially resulted in a strained relationship between Kongphop and Arthit. However, continuous encounters between the two helped transform their relationship into something much more affectionate.

== Cast and characters ==
=== Main ===
- Perawat Sangpotirat as Arthit Rojnapat (Oon)
- Prachaya Ruangroj as Kongphop Suttilak (Kong)

=== Supporting ===
- Thitipoom Techaapaikhun (New) as Kathawuth Hathaiprasert (Aim / Em)
- Neen Suwanamas as May
- Chanagun Arpornsutinan (Gunsmile) as Prem
- Teerapat Lohanan (Fluke) as Wad
- Ittikorn Kraicharoen (Ice) as Knot
- Jumpol Adulkittiporn (Off) as Bright
- Khamchoo Natthawaranthorn as Tutah
- Ployshompoo Supasap (Jan) as Praepailin
- Maripha Siripool (Wawa) as Ma-prang
- Korn Khunatipapisiri (Oaujun) as Tew
- Naradon Namboonjit (Prince) as Oak
- Khemmika Layluck as Khao Fang
- Patipan Intrakul as Minnie
- Phurin Ruangvivajarus (M) as Tee
- Patcharin Thongyangyuen as Koi
- Boochita Pitakard as Ple
- Worakamon Nokkaew as Tim
- Pongpol Saneewong Na Ayutaya as Yacht
- Pitiwat Chaimongkol (Aor) as Tum
- Alysaya Tsoi (Alice) as Namtan
- Thanapas Suttichannapa (M) as Deer
- Jirakit Kuariyakul (Toptap) as Jay
- Wittaya Teptip (Kong) as Kang
- Nuttanan Khunwat (Thaed) as Teacher Pak
- Benja Singkharawat (Yangyi)
- Arada Arayawut (Darling)

== Episodes ==
| No. in series | Title | Directed by | Written by | Original release date |
|---|---|---|---|---|
| 1 | "Episode 1" | Lit Samajarn | Lit Samajarn | 20 August 2016 |
The happy atmosphere of the engineering freshmen orientation is cut short when the hazing team led by Arthit barges in to explain the faculty rules and the SOTUS system. When the nervous freshmen are given the first major order, Kongphop stands up and talks back. The tension between Arthit and Kongphop escalates during their encounters in the following gatherings.
| 2 | "Episode 2" | Lit Samajarn | Lit Samajarn | 27 August 2016 |
The tension between the hazing team and the freshmen continues to escalate to the point that several breakouts occur. Outside of the gathering activities, however, the freshmen start to learn about the hazing team seniors' intention with the activities and their care for them.
| 3 | "Episode 3" | Lit Samajarn | Lit Samajarn | 3 September 2016 |
The tension between the hazing team and the freshmen continues to escalate to the point that several breakouts occur. Outside of the gathering activities, however, the freshmen start to learn about the hazing team seniors' intention with the activities and their care for them.
| 4 | "Episode 4" | Lit Samajarn | Lit Samajarn | 10 September 2016 |
Arthit, now reinstated as the head hazer, orders the freshmen to win every competition for the engineering faculty in the upcoming Freshy Day. Activities that Kongphop and his friends focus on include basketball match, grandstand competition, and Star Contest. Recognition by the seniors is among the main drives for the freshmen, especially Kongphop and Wad, to compete.
| 5 | "Episode 5" | Lit Samajarn | Lit Samajarn | 17 September 2016 |
Kongphop and Praepailin score big victories in Star Contest as they deliver heartfelt performance and speech to express themselves and also communicate with the seniors who show up in the audience for support. At the celebration party, the love triangle among Em, May, and Kongphop becomes clear. At a following hazing gathering, the 4th-year seniors led by Deer show up and punish Arthit and the hazers for their power abuse.
| 6 | "Episode 6" | Lit Samajarn | Lit Samajarn | 24 September 2016 |
The punishment of Arthit extending into the evening prompts a junior–senior joint watch group, a new experience for the freshmen. Kongphop takes the opportunity of delivering food to the recovering Arthit to explore his room and take care of him. The hazing team announces the finale of the hazing activities, the Flag Capturing Event, while working hard to materialize a beach trip afterwards.
| 7 | "Episode 7" | Lit Samajarn | Lit Samajarn | 1 October 2016 |
The Flag Capturing Event challenges the freshmen with brainstorming to figure out their tasks and strategies to complete them, deepening their understanding of S.O.T.U.S. along the way. The last stage takes Kongphop to explain his sincerity of choosing the engineering major to Arthit and convince him to engage in an act by the freshmen which, as revealed later, moves Arthit to tears. The wrist-tying ceremony follows the successful capturing of the flag.
| 8 | "Episode 8" | Lit Samajarn | Lit Samajarn | 8 October 2016 |
The sincerity of the hazing team earns the permission to take the freshmen to the beach as an initiation camp. The joyful activities at the beach trip are mixed with fierce conflicts, but they all settle in cordial understanding at the Walk the Bridge ceremony at the end of the camp, and the freshmen receive their gears.
| 9 | "Episode 9" | Lit Samajarn | Lit Samajarn | 19 November 2016 |
At the end of an earnest conversation at the beach, Kongphop asks a clueless Arthit to take care of his gear. On the bus back to campus, Kongphop gets to look after Arthit. Upon request, Arthit goes shopping with Kongphop and the two exchange gifting idea. They bump into Namtan, Arthit's first crush and friend since high school. The two go to a restaurant and a hair salon afterwards.
| 10 | "Episode 10" | Lit Samajarn | Lit Samajarn | 26 November 2016 |
Arthit decides to crash at Kongphop's place as his is flooded and no other friend is available. While there, Arthit realizes that Kongphop has been keeping a secret and questions if the latter has feelings for him. Kongphop dodges the question, but later admits it when he assumes Arthit is asleep. The next morning, Arthit starts to avoid Kongphop.
| 11 | "Episode 11" | Lit Samajarn | Lit Samajarn | 3 December 2016 |
A meet-up at a café reveals Arthit's past with Namtan and helps Arthit to start dealing with his feelings for Kongphop. That evening, Arthit finally returns Kongphop's call but hangs up before Kongphop could finish his confession. The call leaves both dejected, and Kongphop takes off the thread Arthit tied for him.
| 12 | "Episode 12" | Lit Samajarn | Lit Samajarn | 10 December 2016 |
Arthit and Kongphop continue to avoid each other while both contemplate relationship and their feelings. An accident leads Kongphop to take May to the infirmary, where May confesses her love for Kongphop but is rejected. Em steps up to comfort May and confesses his love for her.
| 13 (Note: This episode marks the end of the original novel by BitterSweet.) | "Episode 13" | Lit Samajarn | Lit Samajarn | 17 December 2016 |
Events leading to and during Tum and Fon's wedding help Arthit and Kongphop understand what they want. After the wedding, Arthit invites Kongphop to a meal and then a walk, at the end of which Arthit opens up to Kongphop and both confess their feelings. One last time at the food booth, Arthit and Kongphop order each other's favorites, and Arthit asks Kongphop to take care of his gear.
| 14 | "Episode 14" | Lit Samajarn | Lit Samajarn | 24 December 2016 |
Arthit grows concerned about many potential boundaries in his relationship with Kongphop, but Knot relieves him of his worries. Arthit eventually announces his relationship with Kongphop at the Thank You party. Kongphop retells the first time he met Arthit, which Arthit has forgotten, and explains his reason to choose the engineering major.
| 15 | "Episode 15" | Lit Samajarn | Lit Samajarn | 7 January 2016 |
At their first initiation gathering, then-freshman Arthit and his friends entered a fierce confrontation with then-head hazer Tum, which seeds Arthit's becoming the head hazer two years later. Now-head hazer Kongphop pursues a different hazing strategy and makes the gathering activities a success. Arthit pays a gathering a visit to deliver a message and ends up staying at Kongphop's where the two look back on their past.
| Special | "SOTUS: Very Special EP" | Lit Samajarn | Unknown | 14 January 2016 |
This episode includes the casting process and some uncut and never-before-seen scenes from the past 15 episodes.

== Soundtrack ==
The soundtrack of the series included two original songs, five featured songs, and approximately 70 licensed tracks as background music.

=== Original songs ===
| Title | Artist(s) | Notable appearance in the series | Ref. |
|---|---|---|---|
| "โซซัดโซเซ" (lit. "Stumbling in Destitution") | Keng Tachaya Prathumwan | Opening song | |
| "ความลับในใจ" (lit. "The Secret in Our Hearts") | Amp Phurikulkrit Chusakdiskulwibul, Gun Achi Achirawich | Ending song | |

=== Featured songs ===
| Title | Artist(s) | Album | Appearance in the series | Ref. |
|---|---|---|---|---|
| "หากพวกเรากำลังสบาย (lit. If You're Happy and You Know It)" | n.a. | n.a. | The first song Kongphop and Praepailin perform at the Star Contest (5-2) | |
| "L.O.V.E." | X3 Super Gang | คูณ 3 ช่อง 2 | The second song Kongphop and Praepailin perform at the Star Contest (5-2) | |
| "ค้นใจ (lit. Search Your Heart)" | J Jetrin Wattanasin | J:Day | The third song Kongphop and Praepailin perform at the Star Contest (5-2) | |
| "ยิ้มเข้าไว้ (lit. Keep Smiling)" | Clash | Crashing | The song Arthit performs at the beach (8-2) | |
| "ขอบคุณที่รักกัน (lit. Thank You for Loving Me)" | Potato | Collection | The song Deer performs at the beach trip performance (8-3) | |

=== Background music ===
| Title | Artist(s) | Album | Notable appearance(s) in the series |
|---|---|---|---|
| "Bright Life" | Thomas Greenberg | Modern Dramedy | Opening scene at the freshmen orientation (1-1) |
| "Prime Suspect" | Rod Abernethy | Dark Evolutions | Arthit debuts with the hazing team at the freshmen orientation (1-1) |
| "The Road to Hell" | David Buckley | Urban Thriller | The very first confrontation between Kongphop and Arthit at the freshmen orientation (1-1) |
| "Let's Go Fishing" | Mr. Stix | Kids Tv 2 | 1st-year female students chilling while discussing how to get all the signatures (1-2) |
| "Mr Duck" | Mr. Stix | Kids Tv | Ma-prang pushes Praepailin to get Arthit's signature (1-2) |
| "American Dream" | Patrick Robert Murdoch, Timothy James Wills | Independent | Em finds it not a bad idea to befriend the seniors after getting gaming tips from Yacht (1-3) |
| "Facing the Board" | Lionel Cohen | Tension | Arthit picks on Kong at the 2nd gathering (1-3) |
| "Power Struggle" | Leon J. Ayers | Tension | Arthit threatens Kongphop with the gear (1-3) |
| "Rebel Movement" | Matt Norman | Conflict and Revolution | Kongphop says he will make Arthit his wife to get the gear from him (1-3) |
| "Daisy Chain" | Mr. Stix | Kids Tv 2 | After-class interlude (1-4) |
| "Mean Streets" | Patrick Robert Murdoch, Timothy James Wills | Indie Outbreak | Passing scenes of freshmen suffering from hazing activities and avoiding the hazing team (2-1) |
| "Ritual of Fear" | Richard Allen Harvey | Ancestral | Tew tells a ghost story about seniors (2-1) |
| "Smash and Burn" | Guy Wallace, Mitchell R. Marlow | Ultimate Trailers | The hazing team catches the freshmen at the bar (2-1) |
| "Underground Intelligence" | Matt Norman | Conflict and Revolution | Prem takes the stage to call out Wad (2-1) |
| "Darkest Hour" | Richard M. Lauw | Tension | Hazing team meeting discusses Prem's wrongdoing (2-2) |
| "Into The Last Light" | Dan Cassady, Dylan Parsons | Cinematic Indie Drama | Kongphop finds a new nametag in his locker (2-3) |
| "Girls Can Too" | Tyler Van Den Berg | Girl Pop | Hazing activities under the sun (2-3) |
| "Presence" | Thomas Garrad-Cole | Lightstream | Fang reveals that it is the hazers who care about the freshmen the most (2-3) |
| "Intriguing Ideas" | Thomas Greenberg | Modern Dramedy | Arthit acting to tease Kong after being revealed that he actually cares about and thinks highly of him (2-3) |
| "Waster" | Brett Carr Boyett, Jason C. Miller | Industrial Rock | Arthit punishes the 2nd year students for subpar chanting (3-1) |
| "Speechless" | Timothy James Wills | Union | Kongphop brings breakfast to his room before seeing Arthit at his porch for the first time (3-2) |
| "Excitement Grows" | Thomas Greenberg | Modern Dramedy | Girls' talks, such as writing down the name of one's crush on an eraser (3-2), Arthit's new hair (10-3), etc. |
| "Crafty Deal" | Thomas Greenberg | Modern Dramedy | Kongphop finds out Arthit likes to drink pink milk (3-4) |
| "City Girl" | Clifford E Haywood | Fun Time Tv | Arthit exchanges his spicy dish with Kongphop (3-4) |
| "Tombstone" | Patrick R. Murdoch, Geoffrey J. P. Holroyde, Vezio Bacci | Modern Hard Rock 2 | Wad gets hurt in the basketball match (4-3) |
| "Thrill Pills" | Jay Price | Adrenalizer | The hazing team shows up in the audience of the basketball final game (4-4) |
| "Against The Wall" | Christian Anthony Arvan, James Brian Brasher | Adrenalin | Basketball final game (4-4) |
| "Andromeda" | Paul J. Borg, Thomas Garrad-Cole | Indie Rock and Pop 3 | The engineering team wins the basketball match (4-4) |
| "Benevolence" | Henry Jackman | Utopia | Sea of flashlights during the power outage in the Star Contest (5-2) |
| "Happy To Be" | Rob Rewes | Sunshine Acoustic | Praepailin is crowned as University's Star (5-3) |
| "Ripples" | Harry Angstrom, Jonathan Buchanan | Euphorica | The 1st year students find out one after another that Arthit is still completing the 54 laps late into the evening (6-1) |
| "Let There Be Light" | Harry Angstrom, Jonathan Buchanan | Euphorica | A crowd greets Arthit at the end of the final lap (6-2) |
| "Oddball Tango" | Bill Connor | Weird and Wonderful | Kongphop explores Arthit's room (6-3) |
| "Supercooler" | Guy Wallace, Zachary Gibson, Nigel William Graham, Mitchell R. Marlow | Rock Urban Hybrid | Prem helps Wad in a fight (6-4) |
| "Hidden Beneath the Surface" | Thomas Greenberg | Modern Dramedy | Kongphop teases Arthit about his nickname (6-4) |
| "Inertial Mass" | Edward Eliot, Nobuaki Nobusawa | The Pursuit of Evidence: Crime & Investigation Themes | Arthit lays down the rules of the flag capturing event (7-1) |
| "Big Society" | Jay Price | 24 Hour News | Freshmen brainstorming how to clear stages and capture the flag (7-1) |
| "Reload" | Jay Price | The Hustle And Con | Coming up the idea to clear the "Seniority" stage of flag capturing (7-1) |
| "The Con" | Jay Price | The Hustle And Con | Clearing the "Seniority" and "Tradition" stages of flag capturing (7-2, 7-3) |
| "Hyperbole" | Jay Price | 24 Hour News | Clearing the "Order" stage of flag capturing (7-2) |
| "Clarity" | Richard Allen Harvey | Clarity | Kongphop explains to Arthit his sincerity to be an engineering student (7-3) |
| "Positive Equity" | Jay Price | 24 Hour News | Stages of flag capturing cleared, flag captured (7-2/3/4) |
| "Somewhere" | Jay Price | Inspired | Wrist-tying ceremony (7-4); |
| "The Style Files" | Thomas Greenberg | Something Simple | The hazers show up to the beach trip in casual clothes (8-2) |
| "Line of Fire" | James Thomas Jr. | Rock Action Hybrid | Kongphop walks into the sea (8-2) |
| "Up My Street" | Mr Stix | Kids Tv 2 | Oak proposes and goes to bring booze to the boy's room after the day's activities are cancelled (8-3) |
| "In Safe Hands" | Patrick Thomas Hawes | Piano Moods | Arthit comes back to Kongphop to continue their talk at the beach (9-1) |
| "Days in the Sun" | Rob Rewes | Sunshine Acoustic | Students have fun shopping during the bus trip break (9-2) |
| "Emotive Tention" | Martin Laschober, Richard M. Lauw | Tension | Kongphop rushes to Arthit's place to check out what is wrong (10-1) |
| "Last Call" | Michael Rheault | Route66 | Flashback to Arthit, Namtan, and Jay's schooldays (11-1) |
| "Sheltering Skies" | Dan Cassady, Dylan Parsons | Cinematic Indie Drama | Em hears May tells Kongphop that she likes him (12-3) |
| "Mindfinder" | Sandy McLelland | Motion | Kongphop tells May that he has someone he likes already (12-3) |
| "Happy Endings" | David Thomas Hawes | Piano Moods | The struggling afternoon before Kongphop and Arthit go to Tum's wedding (13-1) |
| "Trying to Find You" | Greig David Watts, Ian Gordon Curnow, Paul Anthony Lee Drew, Peter Alexander Barringer | Pop Rock Radio | Kongphop and Ple's conversation about how to deal with their once-loved ones (13-1) |
| "Aeroglider" | Jay Price | Lightstream | Tum and Fon's interview at the wedding (13-2) |
| "Daydreamer" | Timothy James Wills | Union | Arthit gives Tum a card as wedding gift and explains its meaning (13-2) |
| "May You Decide" | George Timothy | Songs For The Soul | Arthit asks Tum about relationship (13-2) |
| "Interlude 5" | Philip Hochstrate | Le Voyage De La Vie | Arthit looks for Kongphop after Tum's wedding (13-3) |
| "Distant Signals" | Harry Angstrom, Jonathan Buchanan | Euphorica | Arthit confesses to Kongphop (13-3) |
| "I Can See the Sky" | Harry Angstrom, Jonathan Buchanan | Euphorica | Kongphop and Arthit order each others' favorite drink, and Arthit asks Kongphop to take care of his gear (13-4) |
| "Clean Streets" | John Parricelli, Stan Sulzmann | Sixties Groove Jazz | Bright plays nice to the 1st year students hoping to get good gifts (14-1) |
| "Schooldays Remembered" | Thomas Greenberg | Age of Innocence | Arthit asks Kongphop to go shopping with him (14-1) |
| "I Wanna be Your Everything" | Thomas Collins, Tyler Van Den Berg | Teen Pop Rock | Thank You party (14-3) |
| "A New Hope" | Paul J. Borg, Thomas Garrad-Cole | Indie Rock and Pop 3 | Arthit replaces Kongphop's white thread on the wrist with a bracelet and asks Kongphop to tie him with a matching one, and later announces their relationship (14-3) |
| "Dream for Today" | Thomas Greenberg | Something Simple | Arthit and Kongphop have lunch talking about the first time they met (14-4) |
| "The Calm Before the Kill" | Mitchell R. Marlow | Tension | Tum hosts a gathering and picks on Arthit (15-1) |

== Sequel ==
Due to its popularity, a continuation of the series was announced with both Perawat Sangpotirat (Krist) and Prachaya Ruangroj (Singto) reprising their roles. titled SOTUS S, it premiered on 9 December 2017 and picks up after the events of the first season with Arthit now working in an office and Kongphop becoming the head hazer of the Faculty of Engineering.

== Awards and nominations ==
| Year | Association | Category | Recipient | Result | Ref. |
|---|---|---|---|---|---|
| 2017 | V-Chart Awards 2017 | Media Recommendation Artist | Perawat Sangpotirat and Prachaya Ruangroj | Won | |
| 2017 | V-Chart Awards 2017 | Most Popular New Artist | Prachaya Ruangroj | Won | |
| 2017 | Maya Awards 2017 | Star Couple of the Year | Perawat Sangpotirat and Prachaya Ruangroj | Won | |
| 2017 | Maya Awards 2017 | Best Rising Actor | Prachaya Ruangroj | Won | |
| 2017 | 14th Kom Chad Leuk Awards | Most Popular Actor | Perawat Sangpotirat | Nominated | |
| 2017 | 14th Kom Chad Leuk Awards | Most Popular Actor | Prachaya Ruangroj | Won | |
| 2017 | KAZZ Awards 2017 | Kazz Magazine's Sweetheart | Perawat Sangpotirat and Prachaya Ruangroj | Won | |
| 2017 | KAZZ Awards 2017 | Trending Rookie Actor | Perawat Sangpotirat | Won | |
| 2017 | 6th Attitude Magazine Awards | Most Favorite Couple of the Year | Perawat Sangpotirat and Prachaya Ruangroj | Won | |
| 2017 | 6th Attitude Magazine Awards | Most Favorite TV Series of the Year | SOTUS: The Series | Won | |
