= SOTUS S =

2017–18 Thai television series

- Official series poster
- Also known as: SOTUS S: The Series
- Genre: Boys' love; Romantic comedy; Drama
- Created by: GMMTV
- Based on: SOTUS S : โซตัส เอส by BitterSweet
- Directed by: Jane Botta
- Starring: Perawat Sangpotirat; Prachaya Ruangroj
- Opening theme: "ล้มลุกคลุกคลาน" (Lom Look Kloog Klahn) by Tachaya Prathumwan
- Ending theme: "คำตอบอยู่ที่หัวใจ" (Kam Tob You Tee Hua Jai) by Thanasit Jaturaput
- Country of origin: Thailand
- Original language: Thai
- No. of episodes: 13

Production
- Producer: Bear House Production
- Running time: 50 minutes
- Production companies: GMMTV; Bear House Production

Original release
- Network: One31; LINE TV
- Release: 9 December 2017 – 10 March 2018

Related
- SOTUS; Our Skyy

SOTUS S is a 2017–2018 Thai boys' love television series starring Perawat Sangpotirat (Krist) and Prachaya Ruangroj (Singto). A sequel to SOTUS (2016–2017), it is an adaptation of the novel of same name by Bittersweet. Directed by Jane Botta and produced by GMMTV together with Bear House Production, the series was showcased by GMMTV in their 6 Natures+ event on 2 March 2017. It premiered on One31 and LINE TV on 9 December 2017, airing on Saturdays at 22:15 (ICT) and 23:15 (ICT), respectively. The series concluded on 10 March 2018. The fifth episode of Our Skyy (2018) is a spin-off of SOTUS S.

== Synopsis ==
Fast forward 2 years from the events in SOTUS, Kongphop (Prachaya Ruangroj) is now the head hazer in his faculty, while Arthit (Perawat Sangpotirat) works at a company called Ocean Electric. During Kongphop's final year, he needs to find an internship company and requests to work alongside Arthit over his family's company, unbeknownst to Arthit. After an outing with the company, tensions rise between the two, and both will have to decide their future.

== Cast and characters ==
=== Main ===
- Perawat Sangpotirat (Krist) as Arthit Rojnapat (Oon)
- Prachaya Ruangroj (Singto) as Kongphop Suttilak (Kong)

=== Supporting ===
- Korn Khunatipapisiri (Oaujun) as Tew
- Pattadon Janngeon (Fiat) as Dae
- Krittanai Arsalprakit (Nammon) as Nai Weerawat
- Sivakorn Lertchuchot (Guy) as Yong
- Neen Suwanamas as May
- Thitipoom Techaapaikhun (New) as Em
- Kunchanuj Kengkarnka (Kan) as Todd
- Oranicha Krinchai (Proud) as Earth
- Napasorn Weerayuttvilai (Puimek) as Khao Fang
- Nachat Juntapun (Nicky) as John
- Korawit Boonsri (Gun) as Cherry
- Suttatip Wutchaipradit (Ampere) as Somoh
- Chanagun Arpornsutinan (Gunsmile) as Prem
- Jumpol Adulkittiporn (Off) as Bright
- Maripha Siripool (Wawa) as Maprang
- Ittikorn Kraicharoen (Ice) as Knot
- Natthawaranthorn Khamchoo as Tutah
- Ployshompoo Supasap (Jan) as Praepailin
- Naradon Namboonjit (Prince) as Oak
- Nararak Jaibumrung (Oak) as Durian

== Awards and nominations ==
Year	Award Ceremony	Category	Recipient	Result	Ref.
2018	7th Attitude Magazine Awards	Most Favorite TV Series of the Year	SOTUS S: The Series	Won	
2018	12th KAZZ Awards	Most Favorite Couple of the Year	Perawat Sangpotirat and Prachaya Ruangroj	Won	
2018	12th KAZZ Awards	Most Popular Teen Actor – Male	Prachaya Ruangroj	Won	
2018	4th Maya Awards	Star Couple of the Year	Perawat Sangpotirat and Prachaya Ruangroj	Won	
2018	4th Maya Awards	Male Rising Star (TV)	Prachaya Ruangroj	Won	
2018	1st Great Stars Social Awards	Social Super Star of the Year – Couple	Perawat Sangpotirat and Prachaya Ruangroj	Won	
2018	1st LINE TV Awards	Best Couple	Perawat Sangpotirat and Prachaya Ruangroj	Won	
2018	Sanook! Top Vote of the Year	Best Couple	Perawat Sangpotirat and Prachaya Ruangroj	Won	
2018	12th OK! Awards	Best Couple	Perawat Sangpotirat and Prachaya Ruangroj	Won	
2018	2nd Great Stars Social Awards	Couple of the Year	Perawat Sangpotirat and Prachaya Ruangroj	Won	
2019	15th Kom Chad Luek Awards	Most Popular Actor	Prachaya Ruangroj	Won	
2019	15th Kom Chad Luek Awards	Most Popular Thai Series	SOTUS S: The Series	Won	
