= Kad Suan Kaew =

- Kad Suan Kaew in 2020
- Location: 21 Huay Kaew Road, Suthep, Mueang Chiang Mai district, Chiang Mai province, Thailand
- Opened: 29 February 1992
- Closed: 1 July 2022 (shopping center); 3 January 2025 (Lotus Pang Suan Kaew Hotel)
- Manager: Kad Suan Kaew 2545 Co., Ltd.
- Floors: Shopping center: 6, including basement Central Outlet: 3 Offices: 5 Lotus Pang Suan Kaew Hotel: 14
- Parking: 1,500 vehicles

Kad Suan Kaew (Thai: กาดสวนแก้ว), also known as Kad Suan Kaew Shopping Centre or Kad Suan Kaew Commercial Park, was a shopping mall on Huay Kaew Road in Chiang Mai, Thailand. It opened on 29 February 1992 and operated for more than 30 years. The complex included a department store, retail shops, restaurants, cinemas, a theatre, office space, and the Lotus Pang Suan Kaew Hotel.

== History ==
Kad Suan Kaew was founded by Police Lieutenant Colonel Suchai Kengkankha, a former police officer who had studied architecture before entering property development. The complex was built on Huay Kaew Road in central Chiang Mai and opened in 1992.

The shopping centre was designed with architectural features associated with northern Thailand. Its exterior was covered in dark brown brick or terracotta tiles, giving the building a distinctive appearance among Chiang Mai's large commercial buildings. According to local reporting, the developer established a factory to produce ceramic tiles for the exterior of the complex.

The complex included a ten-storey shopping-centre building and the thirteen-storey Lotus Pang Suan Kaew Hotel, which had 420 rooms. The shopping centre was developed as a mixed-use complex rather than as a department store alone, with retail, entertainment, theatre, and office facilities.

Central Department Store operated a branch within the complex from its opening. Central Retail lists its Chiang Mai branch, opened in 1992, as the company's first Central Department Store outside the Bangkok metropolitan region.

== Facilities and cultural activities ==
Kad Suan Kaew contained retail shops, restaurants, cinemas, and entertainment facilities. Its facilities included Vista cinema halls, the Kad Theatre, an ice-skating rink, a bowling alley, and karaoke venues.

The Kad Theatre was used for theatrical and musical performances. A retrospective account of the complex states that the theatre opened with a performance of South Pacific by a foreign theatre company. The theatre was located on the fifth floor and was reported to have a capacity of approximately 1,500 seats.

The complex also housed the Kad Suan Kaew Performing Arts Centre, which provided facilities and activities related to theatre, music, stage production, and arts education. Its activities included acting instruction, technical work involving lighting and sound, stage design, and theatrical performances.

The mall became a popular meeting place and entertainment venue for Chiang Mai residents during the 1990s and 2000s. Retrospective reports associate it with the opening of a KFC outlet described as the first in northern Thailand, an ice-skating rink, an ice-hockey competition, bowling, concerts, and other events.

== Closure ==
By the late 2010s, Kad Suan Kaew was experiencing financial difficulties amid changes in consumer behaviour, increased competition from newer shopping centres, and broader economic problems. The COVID-19 pandemic further reduced tourism and customer traffic.

In June 2022, the management announced that the shopping centre would close from 1 July for an indefinite period. The announcement cited financial difficulties, the effects of the COVID-19 pandemic, and the decline in tourism. The final day of public operation was 30 June 2022.

During its final days, customers visited the mall for clearance sales and to take photographs. Former customers and residents of Chiang Mai described the complex as a place associated with their childhood, adolescence, and memories of the city's commercial life.

In September 2024, the property was advertised for sale for 3 billion baht. The report described the shopping centre as having permanently closed after more than three decades of operation.
