= Zepp New Taipei =

Music hall in Taiwan

- Interactive map of Zepp New Taipei
- Location: New Taipei, Taiwan
- Coordinates: 25°03′34″N 121°26′58″E
- Owner: Zepp
- Capacity: 2,245

Construction
- Opened: 2020

Zepp New Taipei is a music hall located in Xinzhuang District, New Taipei, Taiwan. The venue was inaugurated in 2020 and belongs to the Zepp group of concert halls in Japan and across Asia.

The space has a maximum capacity of up to 2,245 people standing or 1,025 people seated. Many local and foreign artists have performed there, and since the measures taken during the COVID-19 pandemic were relaxed, national and international shows are again allowed.

The venue is of moderate size, large enough to accommodate thousands of fans. There are also a small number of seating areas on the second floor. To see the full show on stage, visitors can choose the second floor. When spectators want to get up close to the singers, they can use the first floor.

In the area there are many restaurants that include local and international cuisine. It can be reached by public transportation, such as the Airport MRT and bus.

== See also ==
- Zepp
- Taipei Music Center
