= Tachakorn Boonlupyanun =

Thai actress and host (born 1985)

- ทัชชกร บุญลัภยานันท์
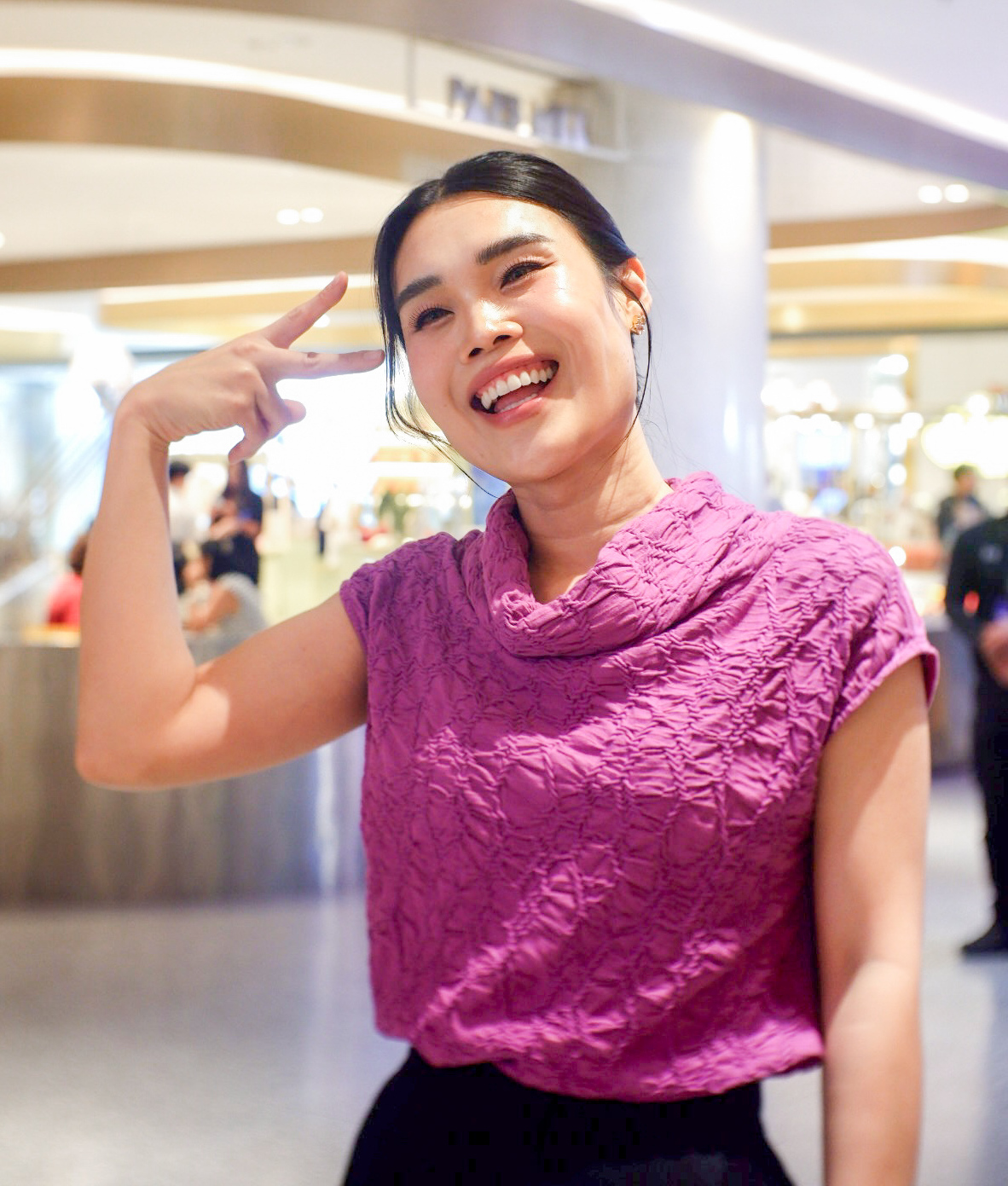
- Tachakorn in 2025
- Born: 2 September 1985 (age 41); Bangkok, Thailand
- Other name: Godji (ก๊อตจิ)
- Education: Chulalongkorn University
- Occupations: Actress; host; television producer; creative director
- Years active: 2011–present
- Agent: GMMTV
- Notable work: Toey Tiew Thai (host, 2011–2023); School Rangers (producer, 2018–2024); 23.5 (actress as Nida, 2024)
- Height: 172 cm (5 ft 7 1/2 in)

Tachakorn Boonlupyanun (Thai: ทัชชกร บุญลัภยานันท์, RTGS: Thatchakon Bunlapyanan; born 2 September 1985), nicknamed Godji (Thai: ก๊อตจิ), is a Thai actress, television host, producer, and creative director affiliated with GMMTV. She gained prominence as a co-host of the long-running travel and lifestyle show Toey Tiew Thai (2011–2023) and Jen Jud God Jig. Beyond hosting, she has produced and directed various television programs, including High School Reunion and School Rangers. As an actress, she is recognized for her roles in Drag, I Love You (2022), 23.5 (2024), and Wu (2026).

== Early life and education ==
Tachakorn was born in Bangkok, Thailand. She is an only child and raised in a small alley of a row of shophouses.

Growing up, she attended Suankularb Wittayalai School, an all-boys school, as her father started to notice her feminine behavior. In the meantime, her teacher called her parents to school and informed them that their child was sexually deviant. So her parents approached her immediately and asked if it was true. When she stated that it was true, they showed no signs of surprise. After she stated it, they had an open conversation, and she felt as like a burden had been removed off her chest.

However, her parents were concerned about their child's future. So they advised her to consult a psychiatrist. At that time, they believed that consulting a psychiatrist would resolve the issue. Then she just went once. When she came out, she told her parents: "This is not fixable. I am who I am. Seeing a psychiatrist won't change that." After that, they told her not to go again. She can do whatever she wants and live her life the way she wants.

After she graduated from high school, she attended Chulalongkorn University and earned her Bachelor of Arts in Chinese. She also received her master's degree in Mass Communication from the same university.

== Career ==
In 2011, she started in the entertainment industry through a popular travel and lifestyle television show Toey Tiew Thai, where she was one of the main hosts along with Kittipat Chalaragse (Golf) and Niti Chaichitathorn (Pompam), also Jennie Panhan who joined in 2016. The program came to an end after 12 years and 593 episodes in 2023.

In 2014, she was the creative director of the youth-oriented music television program Five Live. The following year, she became the producer of High School Reunion until 2018. Later in that year, she was assigned as the producer of a variety and game show School Rangers, the sequel of High School Reunion from 2018 to 2024. She is also the producer of Chuan Len Challenge.

In 2019, she became the host of Jen Jud God Jig alongside Jennie Panhan until 2021. In 2020, she was the producer of Friend Club, a travel show hosted by Jumpol Adulkittiporn (Off), Tawan Vihokratana (Tay) and Weerayut Chansook (Arm). She is also appeared as a host in several television shows.

In the meantime, she is also an actress who has appeared in many television series and film productions. In 2017, she landed her first main role as Eka in Club Friday Season 9: Rak Nok Wela. She is best known as Nida, a trans sapphic teacher in the Thai girls' love television series 23.5 (2024), alongside Kittipat Chalaragse.

== Filmography ==
=== Film ===
Year	Title	Role	Notes	Ref.
2012	Like Love	MC	Guest role	
2022	Buaphan Fun Yub	Janap	Supporting role	

=== Television series ===
Key
†	Denotes television productions that have not yet been released

Year	Title	Role	Notes	Ref.
2013	Love Balloon	Godjiberry	Guest role	
2014	Room Alone 401-410	interviewer	Guest role	
2015	Ugly Duckling: Pity Girl	Martha	Supporting role	
2015	Room Alone 2	Gotcha	Supporting role	
2015	Ugly Duckling: Boy's Paradise	Martha	Guest role	
2017	U-Prince: The Extroverted Humanist	Phuchong	Supporting role	
2017	Club Friday Season 9: Rak Nok Wela	Eka	Main role	
2018	Love Lie Hide Fake: The Series	DJ Godji	Guest role	
2018	Mint to Be	Jelly	Supporting role	
2018	Bangkok Love Stories 2: Innocence	Mednoon	Supporting role	
2018	Our Skyy: Pete-Kao	Ama	Guest role	
2019	Rak Nee Hua Jai Rao Jong	Thongplu	Supporting role	
2020	The Sleepover Show, Thailand 4.0	Kan Tae Hee	Supporting role	
2021	Nabi, My Stepdarling	Finne	Supporting role	
2022	Drag, I Love You	Julia	Supporting role	
2022	Vice Versa	Tama Guaijeng	Guest role	
2023	Midnight Series: Dirty Laundry	Chompoo	Supporting role	
2023	Nobody's Happy If I'm Not	Amy	Supporting role	
2024	23.5	Nida	Supporting role	
2024	We Are	Pui	Guest role	
2024	Ploy's Yearbook	Ness	Guest role	
2024	Peaceful Property	Fan Singsing	Guest role	
2025	Break Up Service	Nut	Supporting role	
2025	The Ex-Morning	Rita	Supporting role	
2025	Me and Thee	Nuch	Supporting role	
2026	Wu	Fei	Supporting role	
TBA	Kiss Me, Remember? †	Eiang	Supporting role	

=== Television shows ===
Year	Title	Channel	Notes	Ref.
2011–2023	Toey Tiew Thai: The Route	Bang Channel; One 31; GMM 25	Main host	
2014–2015	Five Live	Bang Channel; Channel 5	Creative director	
2015–2018	High School Reunion	GMM25	Producer	
2018–2024	School Rangers	GMM25; GMMTV YouTube Channel	Producer	
2018	Nhoo Nok	GMMTV YouTube Channel	Main host	
2019	Moo Jong Pang	GMMTV YouTube Channel	Main host	
2019–2021	Jen Jud God Jig	GMMTV YouTube Channel	Main host	
2020	Play Zone	GMMTV YouTube Channel	Main host	
2020	Friend Club	GMMTV YouTube Channel	Producer	
2016–present	Chuan Len Challenge	GMMTV YouTube Channel	Producer	
2016–present	Manut Pa La Dek	GMM25; LINE TV; GMMTV YouTube Channel	Main host	
2024	Hen Pen Reuang	Channel 7	Regular host	
2024–present	Mae... Maut Yang Ngai Nai Lao Si	Amarin TV	Regular host	

== Awards and nominations ==
Year	Nominated work	Category	Award	Result	Ref.
2017	Toey Tiew Thai: The Route	Best Group Hosts shared with Jennie Panhan and Kittipat Chalaragse	Thailand Fever Awards	Won	
2024	23.5	Y Star on Spotlight of the Year: Scene Snatcher of the Year shared with Kittipat Chalaragse	Y Entertain Awards 2024	Won	
