= List of Love Sick characters =

Love Sick (Thai: รักวุ่น วัยรุ่นแสบ) is a Thai boys' love television series that aired by Channel 9 from 2014 to 2015. It is an adaptation of the novel Love Sick: The Chaotic Lives of Blue Shorts Guys written by Indrytimes. The series starred Chonlathorn Kongyingyong, Nawat Phumphotingam, Luangsodsai Anupart, Chindavanich Primrose, Charnmanoon Pannin, and Vachiravit Paisarnkulwong.

== Characters ==
Character	Portrayed by	Remarks
Noh	Kongyingyong Chonlathorn	Friday College Student; President of the Music Club; Yuri's ex boyfriend Earn's love interest Phun's love interest and later boyfriend Aim's love rival Jeed's love interest
Phun	Phumphothingam Nawat	Friday College Student; Student Council Secretary; Aim's ex boyfriend Noh's love interest and later boyfriend Earn and Yuri love rival Pang's elder brother
Earn	Luangsodsai Anupart	Friday College Student; President of the Cheerleading Club; Likes Noh; Pete's love interest Yuri and Phun love rival Lead singer of Queer band
Pang	Nuchanart Veerakaarn	Convent Student; Obsessed with Boys Love; Phun's little sister Pop's love interest and later girlfriend Shay's love rival Daughter of Thailand ambassador
Aim	Chindavanich Primrose	Convent Student; Phun's ex girlfriend Noh's love rival Friends with Mo, Yuri, Nongnan and Jeed; Expelled from school and went overseas due to a sex scandal
Yuri	Charnmanoon Pannin	Convent Student; Likes Noh; Phun and Earn love rival Naive nature girl Friends with Aim, Mo, Nongnan and Jeed
Jeed	Nungira Hanwutinanon	Convent Student; Daughter of a salesman who sells water filter Friends with Aim, Yuri, Nongnan, Mo and Lhew; Friends with Grace but later enemy Member of the Dance club Has a flair in dancing Khom's and Nueng ex girlfriend Expelled from school due to the Grace hair-cutting incident
Pop	Ausavaterakul Ausavapat	Friday College Student; Pang's fan Pang's love interest and later boyfriend Shay's love rival
Shay	Sirikiet Saejea	Pang's fan Likes Pop; Pang's love rival
Khom	Nontapan Chuenwarin	Friday College Student; Swimmer; Scholarship transferred student Jeed's ex-boyfriend Nueng's love rival Works part time at a bistro Son of a noodle seller Saved Nueng from the pond
Pete	Vachiravit Paisarnkulwong	Friday College Student; Vice president of Cheerleading club Earn's love interest Had a crush on Yuri
Nueng	Vittawat Tichawanich	Friday College Student; Swimmer; Disliked Khom; Jeed's ex-boyfriend Casanova; Saved by Khom from the pond
Taengmo/Mo	Sita Maharavidejakorn	Convent Student; Moan's on-off girlfriend and later ex-girlfriend Golf's love interest Friends with Yuri, Aim, Jeed and Nongnan
Moan	Patcharawat Wongtossawati	Technical school student Casanova; Mo's on-off boyfriend and later ex-boyfriend Golf's love rival
Per	Cheewagaroon Harit	Friday College Student; Member of Music Club and later the President; Noh's junior Win's love interest and later boyfriend Mark love rival
Mawin/Win	Tharathorn Poomphothingam	Friday College Student; Member of Music Club; Noh and Per junior Per's love interest and later boyfriend Mark love interest
Ohm	Chupawit Dejyanakorn (Season 1); Napian Permsombat (Season 2)	Friday College Student; Vice president of Music Club; Noh's best friend Loves to tease the Friday Angels; Mick's love interest and later boyfriend Teaches Mick on horns James love interest Arm's love rival
Mick	Thitipat Pookboonsherd	Friday College Student; Noh and Ohm junior Arm's tutee Ohm's love interest and later boyfriend Arm's love interest James love rival
Arm	Premanan Fifa	Physical Education Teacher at Friday College; Earn and Pete student Mick's tutor Likes Mick; Ohm's love rival
James	Chaiya Jirapirom	Friday College Student; Likes Ohm; Mick love rival
Golf	Suppharoek Miphian (Season 1); Moss Nattapol (Season 2)	Noh's senior and friend Likes Mo; Moan's love rival
Aek	Rabbit Gameplay	Had a sexual relationship with Aim; Phun's love rival
Mark	Theewara Bank	Friday College Student; Likes Win; Per love rival
Fi	Peeranut Peerathanakul	Student Council President; Phun's friend
Nongnan	Coates Samantha Melanie	Convent Student; Friends with Aim, Grace, Grace, Lhew and Jeed; Likes Ohm
Film	Arpornsutinan Chanagun	Friday College Student; Vice president of the Music Club; Friends with Noh
Grace	Manassanant Arkomdhon	Convent Student; Friends with Lhew, Nongnan and Jeed; Has a bad mouth and bad temper Victim of the Jeed Hair-cutting incident
Lhew	Nalurmas Sa-nguanpholphairot	Convent Student; Friends with Grace, Nongnan and Jeed; Ngoi's love interest and later girlfriend
Ngoi	Not Specified	Friday College Student; Friends with Music Club members Lhew's love interest and later boyfriend
