= Jennie Panhan =

Thai actress and host (born 1986)

Watchara Sukchum
- วัชระ สุขชุม
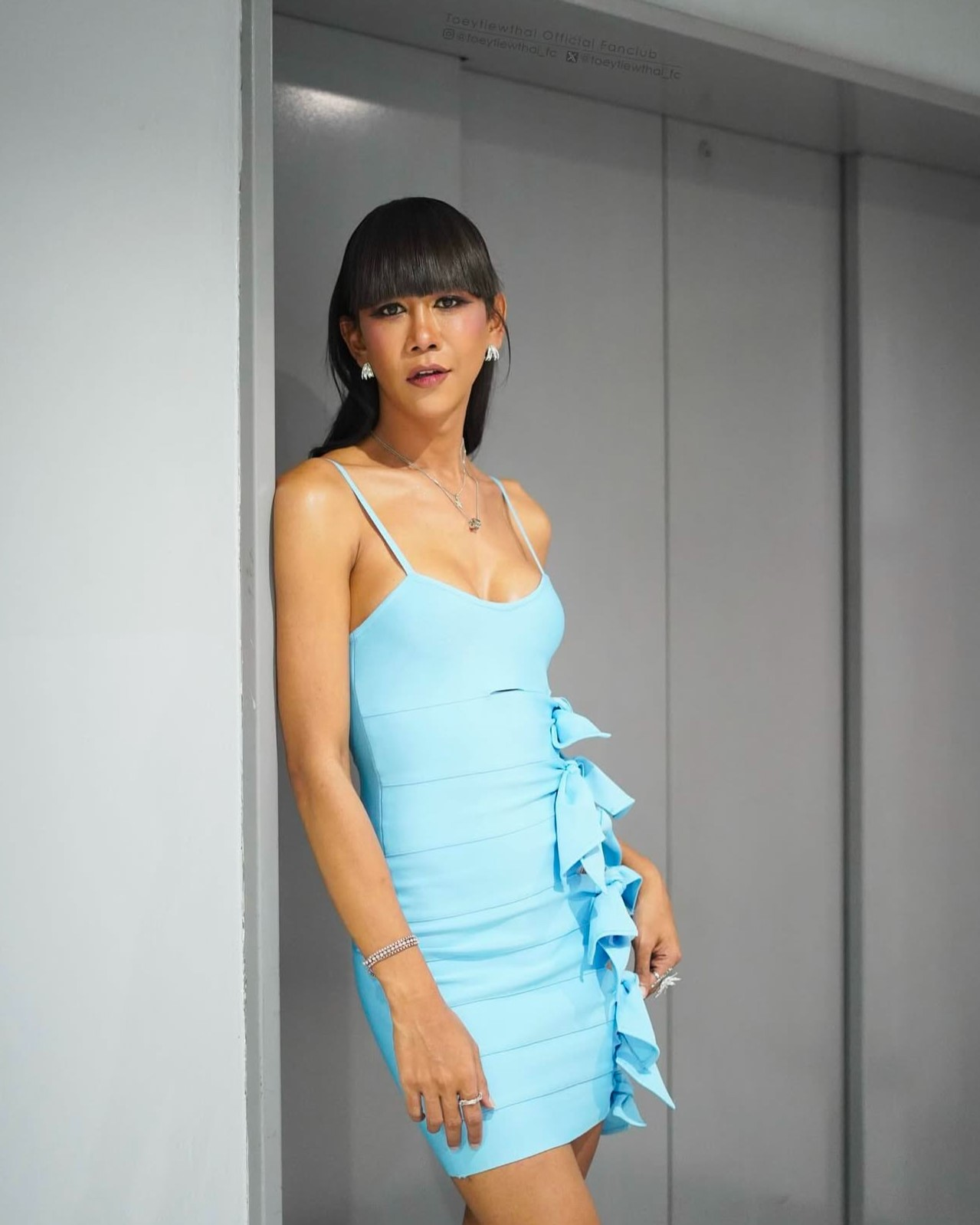
- Panhan in July 2024
- Born: 30 October 1986 (age 40); Songkhla, Thailand
- Other names: Jennie Panhan; Samila J
- Education: Silpakorn University Faculty of Archaeology (B.A. French)
- Occupations: Actress; host; YouTuber
- Years active: 2013–present
- Agents: Trasher Bangkok; GMMTV

Watchara Sukchum (Thai: วัชระ สุขชุม; born 30 October 1986), nicknamed Jennie Panhan (Thai: เจนนี่ ปาหนัน), is a Thai actress and television host. She is best known for hosting several GMMTV programs, including the travel and lifestyle show Toey Tiew Thai: The Route, Hungry Sister, and Jen Jud God Jig. As an actress, she is recognized for her supporting roles in Room Alone 401-410 (2014), 3 Will Be Free (2019), and The Shipper (2020).

== Early life and education ==
Watchara was born in Songkhla Province, Thailand to Police Lieutenant Colonel Satcha Sukchum and Manchusuk Sukchum. She completed her elementary education at Saengthong Vitthaya School and her secondary education at Hatyaiwittayalai School. Although she originally intended to study communication arts, she graduated with a bachelor's degree in French from the Faculty of Archeology at Silpakorn University.

Growing up as a trans woman with a police officer father, Watchara stated that her father had never beaten her, unlike how gender non-conforming children raised in law enforcement households are usually portrayed on television. As the eldest sibling, she is closer to her sister, with whom she has a one-year age gap, than to her younger brother who is six years her junior. Her nickname "Jennie" was inspired by the 1996 Thai film Jenny, while "Panhan" was added during her time at Channel V Thailand because she felt it sounded like a beautiful southern girl.

== Career ==
Watchara entered the entertainment industry through Trasher Bangkok, a Bangkok-based theme party organizer, appearing in their viral parody music videos. Her parody of Katy Perry's "The One That Got Away" caught Perry's attention. This online visibility led to professional opportunities, including a role as an assistant producer for Channel V Thailand and subsequent work on GMM Grammy's Bang Channel.

In 2016, she joined GMMTV's Toey Tiew Thai: The Route as a main host alongside Kittipat Chalaragse (Golf), Tachakorn Boonlupyanun (Godji), and Niti Chaichitathorn (Pompam), who later switched from being the show's main host to its special host. In 2019, she became the host of Jen Jud God Jig alongside Godji until 2021. Alongside her hosting duties, she has worked as an actress in television series, including Love at First Hate (2018), 3 Will Be Free (2019) and The Shipper (2020). She subsequently appeared in The Comments (2021), Astrophile (2022), and Drag, I Love You (2022). In 2023, she portrayed Smile in the comedy-mystery series Midnight Series: Dirty Laundry.

== Filmography ==
=== Film ===
Year	Title	Role	Notes	Ref.
2015	Water Boyy	Nune's friend	Guest role	
2015	Love Next Door 2	Bua	Support role	
2018	Oh My Ghost 5			

=== Television ===
Year	Title	Role	Notes	Ref.
2014	Hormones 2	Jenny (Bom's boyfriend)	Guest role	
2014	Room Alone 401-410	Neon	Guest role	
2015	Wifi Society: The Horror Home	Kla	Supporting role	
2015	Ugly Duckling: Don't	Referee	Guest role	
2016	Toey Tiew Thai: The Route	Herself	Main host	
2016	Gay OK Bangkok	Sathang	Supporting role	
2016	Let's Play Challenge	Herself	Main host	
2017	#TEAMGIRL	Herself	Main host	
2017	Gay OK Bangkok 2	Sathang	Supporting role	
2017	Wrong Say Do	Herself	Main host	
2017	Teenage Mom: The Series	Party girl	Guest role	
2017	Tieng Narng Mai	Ghost wife	Guest role	
2018	Love at First Hate	Joob	Supporting role	
2018	Happy Birthday	Herself	Guest role	
2018	Friend Zone	Satang	Supporting role	
2019	Sucker Kick	Deedee	Supporting role	
2019	3 Will Be Free	Mae	Supporting role	
2019	Jen Jud God Jig	Herself	Main host	
2020	Hungry Sister	Herself	Main host	
2020	My Husband in Law	Amy	Guest role	
2020	The Shipper	Yommathut (Angel of Death)	Supporting role	
2020	The Sleepover Show, Thailand 4.0	Mutter (Tom's mother)	Supporting role	
2020	Jen Jud God Jig Up Level	Herself	Main host	
2020	Still 2gether	Jennie	Guest role	
2021	46 Days	Pang	Supporting role	
2021	Love Pharmacy		Guest role	
2021	The Comments	Gina	Supporting role	
2022	Astrophile	Jaikaew	Supporting role	
2022	Drag, I Love You	Honey	Supporting role	
2022	Under the Desk		Supporting role	
2023	Midnight Series: Dirty Laundry	Smile	Supporting role	
2023	Only Friends	Yo	Supporting role	
2024	Peaceful Property	Tarnsai	Guest role	
2024	Jack & Joker: U Steal My Heart!		Guest role	
2024	Love Sick	Im	Guest role	
2024	My Sweet Taboo	Pornlerd	Main role	
2026	Peach and Me	Herself	Guest role	

== Hosting ==
Year	Thai title	Title	Network	Notes	With
2015-17	2piece 2please		GMM 25		
2016–present	เทยเที่ยวไทย	Toey Tiew Thai: The Route	One 31; GMM 25		
2016-18	ชวนเล่น Challenge		LINE TV; YouTuber:GMMTV		
2017-19	#TEAMGIRL		GMM 25		
2017-18	Wrong Say Do		Mello		
2018	หนูนก		LINE TV; YouTuber:GMMTV		
2018-19	ล้นตู้		YouTuber:ล้นตู้		
2020–present	ล็อกล็อก		YouTuber:Jennie Panhan		
2021–present	Talk with Toeys		GMM 25		

== Awards and nominations ==
Year	Nominated work	Category	Award	Result	Ref.
2017	Toey Tiew Thai: The Route	Best Group Hosts (shared with Tachakorn Boonlupyanun and Kittipat Chalaragse)	Thailand Fever Awards	Won	
2020	—N/a	Girls of the Year	Kazz Awards	Won	
