= Water boy (disambiguation) =

A water boy is a boy that brings water to people.

Waterboy(s) may also refer to:

== Film and television ==
- The Waterboy, a 1998 film starring Adam Sandler
- Waterboys (film), a 2001 Japanese comedy by Shinobu Yaguchi
  - Water Boys (TV series), a TV series based on the film
- Water Boyy, a 2015 Thai film
  - Water Boyy (TV series), a 2017 Thai television series based on the film

== Music ==
- The Waterboys, a Celtic-rock band formed in 1983
- "Waterboy" (song), a traditional folk song performed by Fats Waller, Odetta, John Lee Hooker, and many others, and arranged by Avery Robinson

== See also ==
- Fire boy (disambiguation)
- Water girl (disambiguation)
