= Fireboy (disambiguation) =

Fireboy is a 1993 studio album by Grant McLennan.

Fireboy or Fire Boy may also refer to:

- Fire Boy (folktale), Japanese folktale
- Fireboy DML (born 1996), Nigerian singer
- Fireboy, fictional character in the video game series Fireboy and Watergirl

== See also ==
- Waterboy (disambiguation)
- Watergirl (disambiguation)
- Fireman
- Arson
