= Watergirl (disambiguation) =

A watergirl is a girl that brings water to people.

Watergirl may also refer to:

- Watergirl, fictional character in the video game series Fireboy and Watergirl
- "Watergirl", song by Cashmere Cat from the album Princess Catgirl

== See also ==
- Fireboy (disambiguation)
- Waterboy (disambiguation)
