= Chatchawit Techarukpong =

Thai actor, singer and host (born 1992)

- ชัชชวิศ เตชะรักษ์พงศ์
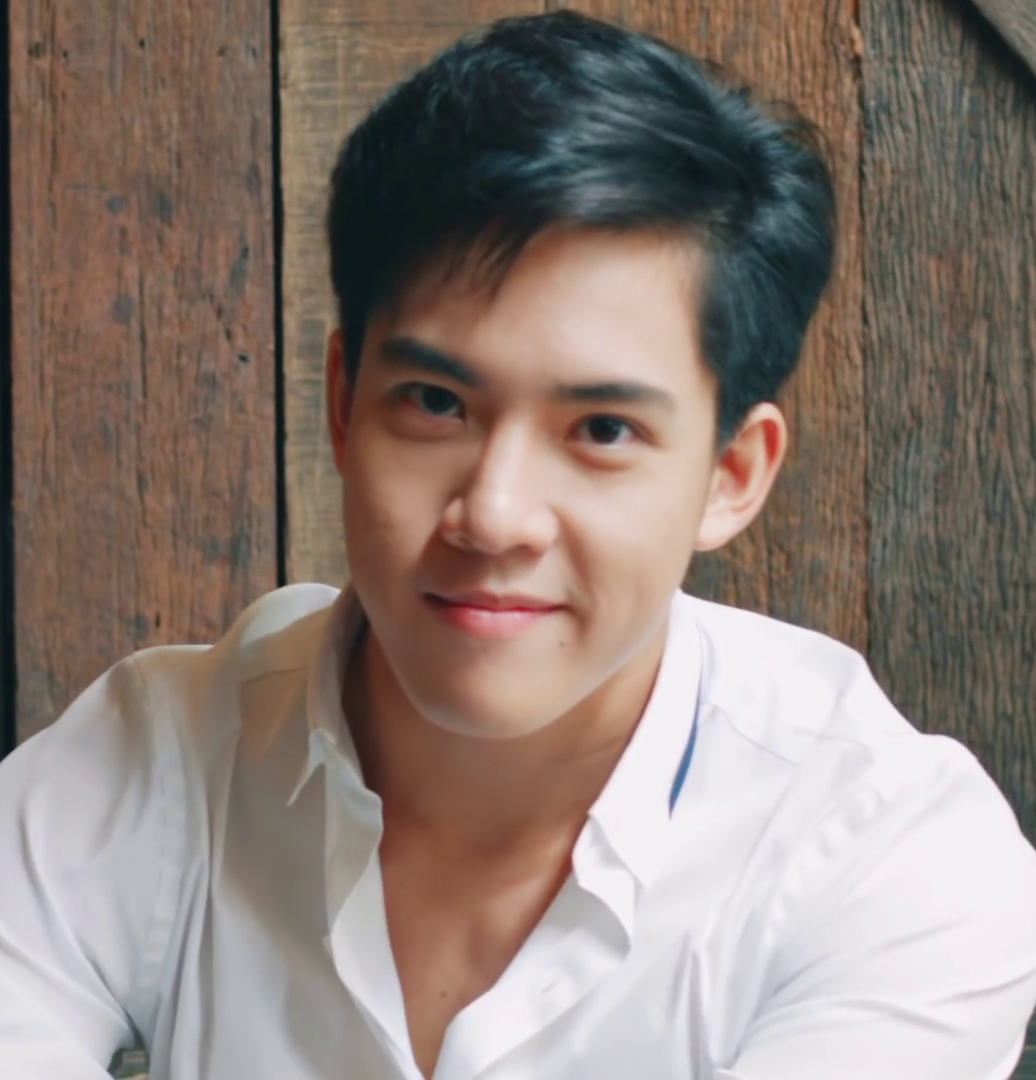
- Chatchawit in 2015
- Born: 22 March 1992 (age 34); Prachuap Khiri Khan, Thailand
- Other names: Victor, Victor Zheng
- Occupations: Actor, host, singer
- Years active: 2013–present
- Known for: Terk in Room Alone 401-410; Min in Water Boyy; Teacher Pom in The Gifted

Chatchawit Techarukpong (Thai: ชัชชวิศ เตชะรักษ์พงศ์; born 22 March 1992), nicknamed Victor (Thai: วิคเตอร์), is a Thai actor. He is known for his starring roles as Terk in Room Alone 401-410 (2014), as Min in Water Boyy (2017) and as Teacher Pom in The Gifted (2018).

== Early life ==
Chatchawit was born in Prachuap Khiri Khan Province, Thailand to a Taiwanese father and a Chinese mother.

== Career ==
Chatchawit started in the entertainment industry by auditioning in several singing competitions such as Teen Superstar under the name TS3 Victor, The Star and Academy Fantasia. Although he did not make it in the said competitions, he was eventually given the opportunity to fulfill his dream to be a singer after signing up with GMMTV and releasing the songs "เราเลือกความรักได้เสมอ" (Rao Leuak Kwahm Ruk Dai Samur), the OST for Room Alone 401-410 (2014), and "กอดสุดท้าย" (Kot Sutthai).

In 2015, he was tapped to host several television programs such as Proteen together with Jumpol Adulkittiporn (Off), Oishi Hitz List and as a backstage host for Asia's Got Talent, Season 1 on Channel 3. He also played main roles in Ugly Duckling: Don't (2015), U-Prince: The Badass Baker (2016), Water Boyy (2017) and The Gifted (2018).

He was one of hosts of School Rangers until its 50th episode in 2018 and was replaced by Nawat Phumphotingam (White). He currently hosts the travel television show Wow! Thailand.

== Filmography ==
=== Film ===
Year	Title	Role	Notes	Ref.
2017	You & Me XXX	Book	Main role	

=== Television ===
Year	Title	Role	Notes	Ref.
2014	Room Alone 401-410	Terk	Main role	
2015	Proteen	Himself	Main host	
2015	Asia's Got Talent (Channel 3)	Himself	Main host	
2015	Oishi Hitz List	Himself	Main host	
2015	Ugly Duckling: Pity Girl	Minton	Guest role	
2015	Ugly Duckling: Don't	Minton	Main role	
2015	Torfun Kub Marvin	Not	Support role	
2015	Room Alone 2	Terk	Main role	
2016	U-Prince: The Gentle Vet	Dash	Guest role	
2016	U-Prince: The Lovely Geologist	Dash	Guest role	
2016	U-Prince: The Badass Baker	Dash	Main role	
2017	Love Songs Love Series To Be Continued: Destiny	Earth	Support role	
2017	Water Boyy	Min	Main role	
2017	U-Prince: The Ambitious Boss	Dash	Guest role	
2017	Bangkok Love Stories: Please	Quick	Main role	
2018	School Rangers	Himself	Main host	
2018	Love Bipolar	Kanit	Support role	
2018	Wow! Thailand	Himself	Main host	
2018	The Gifted	Teacher Pom	Main role	
2019	Boy For Rent	Jayden	Support role	
2019	Fleet of Time	Cheaw	Main role	
2019	Sucker Kick	Li Ming	Guest role	
2019	A Gift For Whom You Hate	Krit	Main role	
2020	The Gifted: Graduation	Teacher Pom	Main role	
2020	Wake Up Ladies: Very Complicated	Jack	Support role	
2021	Mr. Lipstick	Muek	Support role	
2021	46 Days	Warut	Support role	
2021	Baker Boys	Pob	Guest role	
2021	The Revenge	Chan	Support role	
2022	Vice Versa	Thana	Guest role	

== Discography ==
Year	Song Title	Label	Ref.
2014	"เราเลือกความรักได้เสมอ (Rao Leuak Kwahm Ruk Dai Samur)"	GMM Grammy	
2015	"กอดสุดท้าย (Kot Sutthai)"	GMM Grammy	
2016	"My Beautiful Girl"	GMMTV Records	
2017	"พรุ่งนี้ทุกวัน (Phrung Nee Thuk Wun)"	GMMTV Records	
2018	"ติดใจ (Tit Chai)"	GMMTV Records	
