= Mint To Be =

2018 Thai television series

- Official series poster
- Thai: Mint To Be – นายนั่นแหล่ะ... คู่แท้ของฉัน
- Genre: Romantic comedy; Drama
- Created by: GMMTV
- Based on: Mint To Be เขาว่ากันว่า...นายเกิดมาเพื่อเป็นของฉัน! by May112
- Directed by: Kanittha Kwunyoo
- Starring: Perawat Sangpotirat; Worranit Thawornwong
- Country of origin: Thailand
- Original language: Thai
- No. of episodes: 10

Production
- Running time: 60 minutes
- Production companies: GMMTV; Baa-Ram-Ewe

Original release
- Network: GMM 25; LINE TV
- Release: 29 July – 30 September 2018

Mint To Be (Thai: Mint To Be – นายนั่นแหล่ะ... คู่แท้ของฉัน; Mint To Be – Nai Nan Lae Khu Thae Khong Chan) is a 2018 Thai television series starring Perawat Sangpotirat (Krist) and Worranit Thawornwong (Mook).

Directed by Kanittha Kwunyoo and produced by GMMTV together with Baa-Ram-Ewe, the series was one of the ten television series for 2018 showcased by GMMTV in their "Series X" event on 1 February 2018. It premiered on GMM 25 and LINE TV on 29 July 2018, airing on Sundays at 20:30 ICT and 22:30 ICT, respectively. The series concluded on 30 September 2018.

== Cast and characters ==
Below are the cast of the series:

=== Main ===
- Perawat Sangpotirat (Krist) as Mint
- Worranit Thawornwong (Mook) as Bebe

=== Supporting ===
- Nawat Phumphotingam (White) as Bo
- Nara Thepnupa as Bambam
- Jirakit Kuariyakul (Toptap) as Wave
- Maripha Siripool (Wawa) as Nook
- Weerayut Chansook (Arm) as Oat
- Supranee Jayrinpon (Kai) as Mai
- Tachakorn Boonlupyanun (Godji) as Jelly
- Suchada Poonpattanasuk (Hoom) as Boom
- Duangjai Hathaikarn as Grandma Buathong
- Praeploy Oree as Oeae
- Sarunthorn Klaiudom (Mean) as Tubtim

== Soundtrack ==
| Song title | Romanized title | Artist | Ref. |
|---|---|---|---|
| ยิ่งปฏิเสธ ยิ่งรักเธอ | Ying Pa Ti Set Ying Ruk Tur | Worranit Thawornwong (Mook) | |
| ประตู อากาศ และวันดีดี | Pra Too Ar Kard Lae Wan Dee Dee | Perawat Sangpotirat (Krist) | |
