= Secret Seven (TV series) =

2017 Thai television series

- Official series poster
- Thai: Secret Seven – เธอคนเหงากับเขาทั้งเจ็ด
- Genre: School romantic drama
- Created by: GMMTV
- Directed by: Nuttapong Mongkolsawas; Pawis Sowsrion
- Starring: Sutatta Udomsilp; Vorakorn Sirisorn; Tawan Vihokratana; Oabnithi Wiwattanawarang; Thanat Lowkhunsombat; Jirakit Thawornwong; Atthaphan Phunsawat; Chonlathorn Kongyingyong
- Opening theme: "คนแบบไหนดี" (Kon Bap Nai Dee) by Niwirin Limkangwalmongkol
- Ending theme: "แฝง" (Fang) by Joni Anwar
- Country of origin: Thailand
- Original language: Thai
- No. of episodes: 12

Production
- Producer: Sataporn Panichraksapong
- Running time: 60 minutes
- Production companies: GMM Grammy; GMMTV

Original release
- Network: One31; LINE TV
- Release: 19 August – 2 December 2017

Secret Seven (Thai: Secret Seven – เธอคนเหงากับเขาทั้งเจ็ด; Secret Seven – Thoe Khon Ngao Kap Khao Thang Chet) is a 2017 Thai television series starring Sutatta Udomsilp (Punpun) together with seven actors; Vorakorn Sirisorn (Kang), Tawan Vihokratana (Tay), Oabnithi Wiwattanawarang (Oab), Thanat Lowkhunsombat (Lee), Jirakit Thawornwong (Mek), Atthaphan Phunsawat (Gun) and Chonlathorn Kongyingyong (Captain).

Produced by GMMTV and directed by Nuttapong Mongkolsawas and Pawis Sowsrion, the series was one of the six television series for 2017 showcased by GMMTV in their "6 Natures+" event on 2 March 2017. It premiered on One31 and LINE TV on 19 August 2017, airing on Saturdays at 22:00 ICT and 23:00 ICT, respectively. The first seven episodes aired until 30 September 2017 after entertainment programs were temporarily stopped for the month of October in preparation for the royal cremation ceremonies of Thai King Bhumibol Adulyadej. The broadcast of the series resumed on 4 November 2017 and concluded on 2 December 2017.

== Synopsis ==
This is the story of Padlom (Sutatta Udomsilp), a lonely girl who is afraid of love. One day, someone tells her that a guy among the seven young men secretly likes her. Padlom goes into a journey of finding out who among the seven guys is secretly in love with her.

== Cast and characters ==
Below are the cast of the series:

=== Main ===
- Sutatta Udomsilp (Punpun) as Padlom
- Vorakorn Sirisorn (Kang) as Pok
- Tawan Vihokratana (Tay) as Alan
- Oabnithi Wiwattanawarang (Oab) as Gent
- Thanat Lowkhunsombat (Lee) as Play
- Jirakit Thawornwong (Mek) as Id
- Atthaphan Phunsawat (Gun) as Liftoil
- Chonlathorn Kongyingyong (Captain) as Neo

=== Supporting ===
- Suttatip Wutchaipradit (Ampere) as Spoil
- Kornkan Sutthikoses (Arm) as Gun
- Weerayut Chansook (Arm) as Play's guitarist
- Sarunthorn Klaiudom (Mean) as Grace
- Sarocha Burintr (Gigie) as Grace (Id's girlfriend)

=== Guest ===
- Manapat Techakumphu (Bonne) as Jack

== Soundtracks ==
Song title	Romanized title	Artist(s)	Ref.
คนแบบไหนดี	Kon Baep Nai Dee	Niwirin Limkangwalmongkol (Bambam)	
แฝง	Faeng	Joni Anwar	
