= Friend Club =

2020 Thai television show

- Thai: เฟรนด์ขับ
- Genre: Adventure; Travel; Comedy
- Presented by: Jumpol Adulkittiporn; Tawan Vihokratana; Weerayut Chansook
- Country of origin: Thailand
- Original language: Thai
- No. of episodes: 25

Production
- Running time: 22 - 24 minutes
- Production company: GMMTV

Original release
- Network: GMM 25; YouTube; LINE TV
- Release: 23 May 2020

Friend Club (Thai: เฟรนด์ขับ; RTGS: Fren Khap lit: Friend Drive) is a Thai television show hosted by Jumpol Adulkittiporn (Off), Tawan Vihokratana (Tay) and Weerayut Chansook (Arm). Produced by GMMTV, the show premiered on GMM 25 on 23 May 2020, airing on Saturdays at 9:30 ICT and 10:30 ICT on YouTube and LINE TV.

== Background ==
A gang of close friends born in the same year, 1991, (actors Jumpol Adulkittiporn, Tawan Vihokratana and Weerayut Chansook) go on a road trip with friends and enjoy various activities together as they transform every journey into fun.

== Hosts ==
- Jumpol Adulkittiporn (Off)
- Tawan Vihokratana (Tay)
- Weerayut Chansook (Arm)

== Episodes ==
No.	Guests	Original release date	Ref.
1	N/A	23 May 2020	
2	N/A	30 May 2020	
3	N/A	6 June 2020	
4	Vachirawit Chivaaree (Bright); Metawin Opas-iamkajorn (Win)	13 June 2020	
5	Vachirawit Chiva-aree (Bright); Metawin Opas-iamkajorn (Win)	20 June 2020	
6	Perawat Sangpotirat (Krist); Tipnaree Weerawatnodom (Namtan)	27 June 2020	
7	Perawat Sangpotirat (Krist); Tipnaree Weerawatnodom (Namtan)	4 July 2020	
8	Atthaphan Phunsawat (Gun)	11 July 2020	
9	Pathompong Reonchaidee (Toy); Worranit Thawornwong (Mook)	18 July 2020	
10	Kanaphan Puitrakul (First); Pusit Dittapisit (Fluke); Pawat Chittsawangdee (Ohm)	25 July 2020	
11	Thanat Lowkhunsombat (Lee)	1 August 2020	
12	Nawat Phumphotingam (White)	8 August 2020	
13	Nachat Juntapun (Nicky); Leo Saussay	15 August 2020	
14	N/A	22 August 2020	
15	N/A	29 August 2020	
16	Jirakit Kuariyakul (Toptap); Chinnarat Siripongchawalit (Mike)	5 September 2020	
17	Ployshompoo Supasap (Jan); Harit Cheewagaroon (Sing)	12 September 2020	
18	Prachaya Ruangroj (Singto)	19 September 2020	
19	Way-Ar Sangngern (Joss)	26 September 2020	
20	Wachirawit Ruangwiwat (Chimon); Korapat Kirdpan (Nanon)	3 October 2020	
21	Chanagun Arpornsutinan (Gunsmile); Patara Eksangkul (Foei)	10 October 2020	TBA
22	Thanawat Rattanakitpaisan (Khaotung); Suphakorn Sriphotong (Pod)	17 October 2020	TBA
23	Tanutchai Wijitwongthong (Mond)	24 October 2020	TBA
24	Purim Rattanaruangwattana (Pluem)	31 October 2020	TBA
25	N/A	7 November 2020	TBA
