= Reminders (TV series) =

2019 Thai television series

- REMINDERS เพราะคิดถึง
- Genre: Boys' love; Romance; Friendship; Drama
- Directed by: New Siwaj Sawatmaneekul
- Starring: Chonlathorn Kongyingyong; Nawat Phumphotingam; Suppapong Udomkaewkanjana; Tanapon Sukumpantanasan; Rathavit Kijworalak; Phiravich Attachitsataporn; Itthipat Thanit
- Original language: Thai
- No. of episodes: 3

Production
- Production company: Hive x 4nologue

Original release
- Network: Line TV
- Release: April 17 – April 20, 2019

Related
- Love Sick: The Series

Reminders (Thai:REMINDERS เพราะคิดถึง), also known as Reminders: Because I Miss You, is a Thai BL three-part miniseries that depicts three couples in university at different levels in their relationships. Reminders stars Chonlathorn Kongyingyong (Captain) and Nawat Phumphotingam (White), who reprise their roles from Love Sick: The Series as Noh and Phun. Reminders revisits these two characters who are now much older and in university.

They are joined by Suppapong Udomkaewkanjana (Saint) and Tanapon Sukumpantanasan (Perth), who appear in Reminders as Son and Pin. Son and Pin are in a relationship and dealing with issues of jealousy, self-confidence and trust. While Rathavit Kijwaraluk (Plan) and Mean Phiravich Attachitsataporn (Mean) appear as Wish and Two, a couple that is starting out in their relationship.

Reminders is directed by Siwaj Sawatmaneekul (New), where he explores the experiences of three young couples going through romance, relationship issues and forging friendship bonds while navigating the pressures of school. The series is promoted in collaboration by Hive and 4nologue and it aired on Line TV on April 17, 2019 to Apr 20, 2019.

== Plot summary ==
The series is set up in three parts following six characters: Pin, Son, Noh, Phun, Wish and Two. They are all in university.

=== Part One ===
Pin and Wish are in the university's soccer team, and after practice they head to the locker rooms where Pin worries that he needs to lose weight showing his insecurities. They are met by Son, who is Pin's boyfriend, and they decide to head out for lunch. Pin insists on driving Son's car, saying that he is Son's husband and should therefore help Son do everything.

At the same time, Noh, who is now a music major, is in the university study hall tuning his guitar when a friend reminds him of an assignment. He runs out to complete it. On the way, Phun comes looking for him and Noh stops in surprise. Noh chooses to chat with Phun in the school courtyard and reveals that Phun has been too busy with schoolwork to meet him. Noh is convinced that Phun does not have time to care about anything else, as he is so busy. Phun assures him that he still cares for Noh, and misses him very much. Phun then asks Noh to eat a meal with him to make up for lost time. Noh agrees and they head out for lunch.

Pin is distracted by Wish on their drive to lunch, and he is looking at a map on Wish's phone while driving. Son urges Pin to be careful, and focus, but not fast enough as Pin almost hits Phun and Noh who are crossing the road on their way to lunch. Phun and Noh fall on the tarmac, breaking Noh's guitar in the process. Pin stops the car and comes out of the car to apologize but Noh loses his temper at the near-accident. A scuffle ensues between Noh and Wish. Son and Phun try to calm them down, and Son gets injured.

Pin insists on taking Son to the hospital, and promises Noh that they will take responsibility for the accident. Phun and Noh follow Son, Pin and Wish to the hospital. As Son is treated, Phun asks Noh what he will do about his broken guitar. Noh is sad about the guitar damage as he has an upcoming music competition. Phun assures Noh that he will find a way to make it work. Noh then remembers his assignment and gets up to leave, telling Phun they should go. Son insists on getting Noh's phone number so that he can pay for Noh's guitar.

Back at Son's dorm room, Pin is upset that he got Son hurt, but Son assures him that as long as Pin stays with him, he is fine. They kiss and makeup but then Son insists that Pin should go home as Son has an exam in the morning. When Pin leaves, Son messages Noh to apologize for the car accident and the broken guitar. He asks how he can repay the inconvenience caused.

Noh sends Son a link to a post on his Facebook account. He asks Son to share it and vote for him so that he can win, and he will be able to win money for his guitar. Son shares the post, but then Pin sees the post on Son's feed and starts to worry. The next day, Pin talks to Two about his concerns, and they both wonder what Wish and Son are hiding.

Later, Two finds Wish at Noh's music practice room and accuses Wish of having an affair with Noh. Meanwhile, Pin believes Son is hiding something from him.

=== Part Two ===
Two tells Pin that he saw Wish at Noh's music practice room. Two is suspicious of Wish's presence at Noh's music practice room and is worried Noh might flirt with Wish. Pin reassures Two that he talked to Son, and discovered that Son is tutoring Noh for his English class. He is convinced that Son invited Wish to go to the practice room together for added security. Two is not convinced by this explanation and still believes that Noh is flirting with Wish.

Pin then tells Wish not to worry as Noh might be in a relationship with Phun, though none of them know for sure. Pin decides to find Phun and ask for the truth in order to clear the misunderstandings.

Pin goes to Phun's school and asks Phun if Noh is his boyfriend. When Phun says yes, Pin asks Phun if he knows why Noh and Son, Pin's boyfriend, are spending time together. Phun, who is always busy with his classes, decides to have a talk with Pin hoping to clear Pin's misunderstandings. Phun takes Pin to a cafe for coffee where he listens to Pin's concerns about his boyfriend, Son, and how Son has changed lately. After listening, Phun advises Pin to have trust in his boyfriend, otherwise the distance between them would only grow.

Meanwhile, Noh goes to Phun's school with a cup of coffee and a care package hoping to see Phun. Noh discovers Phun in the coffee shop talking to Pin. He checks his messages to find one from Phun asking Noh not to find him at his school as he was too busy. Upset, Noh leaves without talking to Phun.

Two goes to see Wish at his house after their fight over Noh. Wish is still upset and believes that Two does not care for him, which upsets Two. Wish asks Two to leave, but Two gets on his knees to beg for forgiveness. Two promises to do anything until Wish feels better. Wish tells him to stay kneeling until he feels happy.

Two keeps kneeling, and Wish comes to find him, telling him to get up and go home. Two insists that he will not leave until Wish forgives him. Wish does forgive him, and insists on Two bringing him breakfast the next morning to make up for his wrongdoings. Two shows up at Wish's house the next morning with breakfast, surprising Wish. Two then spends the day at Wish's house, doing chores while flirting with Two. Wish offers to help Two change a bulb, and when Wish shakes the chair Two is using, Two falls on the floor injuring his leg. Two and Wish end up at the hospital, bickering until the doctor, played by God Itthipat Thanit, decides to give them relationship advise.

After the doctor's appointment, Wish shows up at Noh's music practice room where he asks Noh and Son what he should do about his relationship with Two. Noh advises him to be true to himself, so that he does not regret his decisions later. Son also tells Wish to be brave and ask Two to be his boyfriend first, without waiting for Two to ask.

Pin finds Two in the school bathroom worrying about what to do next about his relationship with Wish. Pin suggests going to find Phun for relationship advice. Pin and Two share their struggles with Phun who tells them to be patient and give their boyfriends time and not to force anything. Saying if love exists, there will be hope. Pin takes a selfie with Phun and Two and posts it. Then they speculate on the mystery of what Son, Wish and Noh are doing together.

Two goes to Wish's house in the evening, and Wish asks if Two can pick him up every morning to go to school, or bring him home every afternoon. Two refuses, saying Wish is never serious with his feelings for Two. Nor does he take Two's feelings for Wish seriously.

Meanwhile, Noh has been teaching Son how to play guitar, and when Son leaves for the day, Noh checks his phone to find Pin's selfie post with Phun and Two at the cafe. Once again, it upsets him, and when Phun goes to look for him late in the evening, Noh confronts him about it. Phun explains that Pin and Two visited him at his school and he could not turn them away. Noh then asks why Phun always turns him away when Noh goes to look for him. Noh also wonders why Phun never seeks him out when he is not busy. Noh concludes that if it is too hard to find time for him, then they should end their relationship.

Pin surprises Son with a visit at his dorm room and finds Son's guitar on the floor. Son is not happy about the surprise visit, but then Pin discovers a note Son has written to Noh. Pin misunderstands Son's intentions and accuses him of lying and hiding secrets. Pin then decides they should break up.

=== Part Three ===
Noh gets upset when Phun says he has no time. He points out that Phun seems to find time to have coffee with Pin and Two, even as he claims he is too busy to meet Noh. Angry with Phun, Noh reminds Phun that he also has a busy schedule, but when he gets a moment, he always goes to find Phun. However, when Phun's schedule lets up, he never tries to find Noh. Noh decides that if it is too hard for Phun to find time for him, then they should stop seeing each other.

Phun doesn't understand Noh's anger and calls the issue small. Noh insists that it is not a small issue. If they cannot find time during their fourth year of school, he wonders what will happen in the future when they both become even busier with their careers. Noh feels it is easier that they break up now, rather than later. Phun would also be able to find someone better in the future.

Upset, Phun says he does not want anyone else. He hugs Noh and reminds Noh that he promised not to talk about breaking up with him. Phun then tells Noh that he is willing to do everything to keep Noh by his side forever. All Noh has to do is ask, and he will do anything for their relationship. They make up on the street, and Noh smiles in relief.

Two tells Wish that if his feelings are like a joke to Wish then he does not want to date him. When Two gets up to leave, Wish tells him that he was going to ask if Two could be his boyfriend. Two is unbelieving at first, but then Wish insists he is serious, and Two agrees after some teasing, dubbing their relationship 'Two-Wish'.

Pin insists that he cannot trust Son because Son had lied to him about teaching Noh English and many other things. Pin starts to walk out after deciding they should break up if they cannot have trust in each other. Son breaks down and tells Pin the truth about his guitar lessons with Noh. Son tells Pin that he wanted to play a song for Pin on his birthday and asked for Noh's help. Son sings his song to Pin, he apologizes for lying and they make up.

The series ends with a round of happy smiles and tight hugs.

== Cast ==
=== Main roles ===
- Captain Chonlathorn Kongyingyong as Noh

Noh is a Music major student, who is also Phun's longtime boyfriend. Noh is the main character in Love Sick the Series.

- White Nawat Phumphothingam as Phun

Phun is an Economics major student, who is Noh's longtime boyfriend. Phun is a major character in Love Sick the Series.

- Suppapong Udomkaewkanjana (Saint) as Son
- Tanapon Sukumpantanasan (Perth) as Pin
- Rathavit Kijwaraluk (Plan) as Wish
- Phiravich Attachitsataporn (Mean) as Two

=== Supporting/guest roles ===
- God Itthipat Thanit as Doctor
- Blue Pongtiwat Tangwancharoen (Guest)
- Yacht Surat Permpoonsavat (Guest)
- Boun Noppanut Guntachai (Guest)

== Production ==
Reminders the series is directed by New Siwaj Sawatmaneekul and promoted by Hive and 4nologue. The last part of the series was first screened during the Millennial's Choice 2019 Fan meeting Reminders, and then aired on Line TV.
