= Love Bipolar =

2018 Thai television series

- Official series poster
- Thai: Love Bipolar – เลิฟนะคะ รักนะครับ
- Genre: Romantic comedy; Drama
- Created by: GMMTV
- Starring: Toni Rakkaen; Laila Boonyasak
- Country of origin: Thailand
- Original language: Thai
- No. of episodes: 4

Production
- Producers: On & On Infinity
- Running time: 45 minutes
- Production companies: GMMTV; On & On Infinity

Original release
- Network: GMM 25; LINE TV
- Release: 18 March – 8 April 2018

Love Bipolar (Thai: Love Bipolar – เลิฟนะคะ รักนะครับ; Love Bipolar – Love Na Kha Rak Na Khrap) is a 2018 Thai television series starring Toni Rakkaen and Laila Boonyasak (Ploy).

Produced by GMMTV together with On & On Infinity, the series was one of the ten television series for 2018 showcased by GMMTV in their "Series X" event on 1 February 2018. It premiered on GMM 25 and LINE TV on 18 March 2018, airing on Sundays at 20:30 ICT and 22:30 ICT, respectively. The series concluded on 8 April 2018.

== Cast and characters ==
Below are the cast of the series:

=== Main ===
- Toni Rakkaen as Sang Nuea / Sang Tai
- Chermarn Boonyasak (Ploy) as Wenny

=== Supporting ===
- Carissa Springett as Arin
- Penpak Sirikul (Tai) as Yupin
- Chatchawit Techarukpong (Victor) as Kanit
- Thanaboon Wanlopsirinun (Na) as Khun Phol
- Tatchakorn Boonlapayanan (Godji) as Tuktik

== Soundtrack ==
| Song title | Romanized title | Artist | Ref. |
|---|---|---|---|
| ไม่รู้ตัวเองเหมือนกัน | Mai Roo Tour Eng Muan Gan | Kulamas Limpawutwaranon (Knomjean) | |
