= Mahidol University International Demonstration School =

Mahidol University International Demonstration School (MUIDS)
- โรงเรียนสาธิตนานาชาติ มหาวิทยาลัยมหิดล

Location
- 999 Phutthamonthon Sai 4 Rd; Salaya, Phutthamonthon; Nakhon Pathom, 73170; Thailand; 13.799895°N 100.323802°E

Information
- School type: International school
- Established: 2013
- Founder: Dr. Penny Lorwatanapongsa
- Authority: Mahidol University
- School number: +(66)2-408-8555
- CEEB code: 695150
- School Director: Singhanat Nomnian
- Deputy Director for Academic Affairs: Matthew Allsopp
- Staff: 43
- Faculty: 63
- Grades: Grade 10–12 (Mathayom 4–6)
- Gender: Coeducation
- Age range: 15-18
- Enrollment: 820
- Student to teacher ratio: 13:1
- Education system: Advanced Placement (AP)
- Campus: Salaya, Thailand
- Campus type: Suburban, gated community
- Colours: Blue and yellow
- Slogan: Mahidol The Wisdom of the Land
- Song: ต้นกล้าสู่สากล (Excelsior)
- Athletics: Asia International Schools Athletic Association (AISAA)
- Nickname: Satit Mahidol, MUIDS,
- Rival: Manchester United
- Accreditation: Western Association of Schools and Colleges (WASC) (USA), Ministry of Education (Thailand)
- Tuition: Grades 10: 589,000 THB; Grades 11: 394,000 THB; Grades 12: 394,000 THB; (A one-time registration fee of approximately 100,000 THB is also charged)
- Website: muids.mahidol.ac.th

Mahidol University International Demonstration School (MUIDS) (Thai: โรงเรียนสาธิตนานาชาติ มหาวิทยาลัยมหิดล, RTGS: Rong Rian Sathit Nana Chat Mahawittayalai Mahidol) is a co-educational, international high school owned and operated by Mahidol University. The school is located on the Mahidol Salaya campus twenty-five kilometers west of Bangkok, Thailand.

The MUIDS curriculum is a synthesis of the Content Standards for California Public Schools and the Thailand Ministry of Education Content Standards for Basic Education. MUIDS graduates study at Thai, Thai international, and international universities. MUIDS is certified by Western Association of Schools and Colleges (WASC) as well as the Thai Ministry of Education.

== Graduating Class Code ==
Mahidol University International Demonstration School (MUIDS) uses a batch-based system similar to that of many Thai schools. Under this system, graduating cohorts are identified by sequential batch numbers. For example, the Class of 2023 is referred to as MUIDS08, indicating the 8th graduating class since the school's first cohort, MUIDS01, graduated in 2016.

== History ==
In 2008, Mahidol University conducted a study to determine the possibility of creating an international demonstration school as a feeder school for the university. In 2010, the university assembled a board of directors who lead the creation of MUIDS. The school officially opened in the fall of 2013 and graduated its first senior class in the summer of 2016.

== Curriculum ==
The core curriculum (math, science, English, social studies, etc.) at MUIDS is supported by coursework in required electives (technology, physical education, fine arts) and career-based electives (business, medicine, etc.). Advanced Placement (AP) courses are also available for students. The Thai Ministry of Education mandates that all students take Thai Language and Civics courses. Native and non-native speakers take separate classes. The school combines the Thai Ministry of Education and American Common Core Standards.

Students are required to earn twenty community service hours per year as well as one hundred learner development hours through clubs and activities. They may choose from several electives such as Intro to Software Engineering, Zoology, and even Entrepreneurship.

== School year ==
The MUIDS school year begins in August and ends in June. It consists of one hundred and eighty school days stretched across four quarters. The school observes Thai and Buddhist holidays as well as certain Western holidays.

The academic program is organized on a period schedule. Classes are year-long; each period meets anywhere from one to five times a week. MUIDS students earn a minimum of 81 credits over a three-year period. They must earn at least 27 credits every school year.

At the end of the school year students and teachers participate in “Week Without Walls,” spending a week of school outside of the classroom learning in a non-conventional environment. This one-week trip always takes place outside the city of Bangkok.

== Extracurricular activities ==
The student activities program is designed to complement and enrich the academic program as well as provide avenues for further development. More than thirty after school activities and clubs are available for students. Among them are MUIDS Journalism Club, Model United Nations, Junior Achievement, and Yearbook. MUIDS sports teams compete with other schools throughout Thailand. Thai students can also join ROTC.

== Faculty ==
67 faculty members work at MUIDS. Roughly one third are Thai nationals, one third are Americans, and around ten percent are British. Remaining teachers come from Bangladesh, India, Pakistan, Russia, South Africa, Columbia, Bhutan, Uganda, France, Iran, the Philippines, and Canada. Over a third hold master's degrees and teaching qualifications.

== Student body ==
823 students currently attend MUIDS of which the majority are Thai. Just over 80% of them live in the greater Bangkok area, while the remaining Thai students come from other Thai provinces. Non-Thai students include those of Japanese, Taiwanese, Chinese, Vietnamese, Korean, British, and American nationalities, as well as students of mixed Thai heritage.

== Notable alumni ==
- Chonlathorn Kongyingyong (Thai: ชลธร คงยิ่งยง), Thai actor
- Bhitchayoot Sima-Aree (Thai: พิชยุตม์ สิมะอารีย์), Thai golfer
