= Hungry Sister =

2020 Thai web series

- Thai: Hungry Sister – พี่สาวฉันหิว
- Genre: Food; Comedy
- Country of origin: Thailand
- Original language: Thai
- No. of episodes: 6

Production
- Production company: GMMTV

Original release
- Network: YouTube; Facebook Watch
- Release: 25 February – 21 July 2020

Hungry Sister (Thai: Hungry Sister พี่สาวฉันหิว; Hungry Sister Phi-sao Chan Hio) is a Thai web series of GMMTV hosted by Watchara Sukchum (Jennie) and Tawan Vihokratana (Tay) currently available for streaming on YouTube and Facebook Watch.

Each episode features different places where Tay introduces one of his friends to Jennie as they enjoy a meal together. The series premiered on 25 February 2020 and airs every 2nd and 4th Tuesday of the month. It aired its last episode on 21 July 2020.

== Episodes ==
No.	Guest	Original release date	Ref.
1	Sattachai Sasiphongsakorn (Korn)	25 February 2020	
2	Poompat Iam-samang (Up)	10 March 2020	
3	Varot Makaduangkeo (Arm)	9 June 2020	
4	Apicha Jarudilokworakul (Boss)	23 June 2020	
5	Thatchathon Subanun (Pop)	7 July 2020	
6	Chonlatharn Chiayvareesajja (Gino)	21 July 2020	
