= Wow! Thailand =

Thai travel television show

- Thai: ไทยทึ่ง Wow! Thailand
- Genre: Travel
- Presented by: Chatchawit Techarukpong; Nachat Juntapun; Leo Saussay; Methavee Pichetchaiyuth
- Country of origin: Thailand
- Original language: Thai
- No. of episodes: 106

Production
- Production company: GMMTV

Original release
- Network: GMM 25; YouTube
- Release: 1 July 2018

Wow! Thailand (Thai: ไทยทึ่ง WOW! THAILAND; Thai Thueng Wow Thailand) (lit. Amazing Wow! Thailand), is a Thai travel television show hosted by Chatchawit Techarukpong (Victor), Nachat Juntapun (Nicky), Leo Saussay and Methavee Pichetchaiyuth (Now). It features stories and destinations throughout the 77 provinces across Thailand. Produced by GMMTV, the show premiered in Thailand on 1 July 2018 on GMM25.

== Hosts ==
=== Current hosts ===
- Chatchawit Techarukpong (Victor)
- Nachat Juntapun (Nicky)
- Leo Saussay
- Methavee Pichetchaiyuth (Now)

=== Former hosts ===
- Note Chern-yim
- Jetrin Wattanasin (J Jetrin)
- Pimlada Chaiprichawit (Prae)
- Rungtham Pumseenil (Rung)
- Padueng Songsang (Jazz Chuanchuen)
- Pakk
- Chainon Chantem (Off)
