= List of Love Sick episodes =

List of episodes of Thai television series

Love Sick (Thai: รักวุ่น วัยรุ่นแสบ) is a Thai boys' love television series based on the novel Love Sick: The Chaotic Lives of Blue Shorts Guys. The series aired on Channel 9 MCOT HD for two seasons, comprising a total of 48 episodes.

== Series overview ==
Season	Episodes	Originally aired	
First aired	Last aired		
1	12	July 6, 2014	September 21, 2014
2	36	May 2, 2015	October 10, 2015

== Episodes ==
=== Season 1 (2014) ===
No. in series	No. in season	Original air date
1	1	July 6, 2014
2	2	July 13, 2014
3	3	July 20, 2014
4	4	July 27, 2014
5	5	August 3, 2014
6	6	August 10, 2014
7	7	August 17, 2014
8	8	August 24, 2014
9	9	August 31, 2014
10	10	September 7, 2014
11	11	September 14, 2014
12	12	September 21, 2014

=== Season 2 (2015) ===
No. in series	No. in season	Original air date
13	1	May 2, 2015
14	2	May 3, 2015
15	3	May 9, 2015
16	4	May 10, 2015
17	5	May 16, 2015
18	6	May 17, 2015
19	7	May 23, 2015
20	8	May 24, 2015
21	9	May 30, 2015
22	10	May 31, 2015
23	11	June 6, 2015
24	12	June 7, 2015
25	13	June 13, 2015
26	14	June 14, 2015
27	15	June 20, 2015
28	16	June 21, 2015
29	17	June 27, 2015
30	18	June 28, 2015
31	19	July 4, 2015
32	20	July 5, 2015
33	21	July 11, 2015
34	22	July 12, 2015
35	23	July 18, 2015
36	24	July 19, 2015
37	25	August 8, 2015
38	26	August 9, 2015
39	27	August 15, 2015
40	28	August 16, 2015
41	29	August 22, 2015
42	30	August 23, 2015
43	31	September 5, 2015
44	32	September 6, 2015
45	33	September 12, 2015
46	34	September 13, 2015
47	35	October 3, 2015
48	36	October 10, 2015
