= Talk with Toey =

Thai late-night talk show

- Thai: ทอล์ก-กะ-เทย
- Genre: Late-night talk show
- Directed by: Niti Chaichitathorn
- Presented by: Niti Chaichitathorn
- Country of origin: Thailand
- Original language: Thai
- No. of episodes: 227: 129 (Talk with Toey Tonight); 71 (Talk with Toey One Night); 27 (Talk with Toey)

Production
- Production company: GMMTV

Original release
- Network: GMM 25
- Release: 1 November 2015

Related
- Toey Tiew Thai

Talk with Toey (Thai: ทอล์ก-กะ-เทย; RTGS: Thok-Ka-Thoei), is a Thai late-night talk show hosted by Niti Chaichitathorn (Pompam). Produced by GMMTV, the show originally premiered in Thailand on 11 November 2015 and is currently airing in GMM 25.

== History ==
The show first aired on 1 November 2015 as Talk with Toey Tonight on GMM 25 with re-runs on Bang Channel starting 5 November 2015 to 24 December 2015, a week before Bang Channel ceased to broadcast on 31 December 2015.

On 24 June 2018, Talk with Toey Tonight aired its final episode on GMM 25 and moved to One 31 on 18 July 2018 under a new name, Talk with Toey One Night.

On 21 December 2019, Talk with Toey One Night aired its final episode on One 31 and moved back to GMM 25 on 11 January 2020 with the name Talk with Toey.
