= Toey Tiew Thai =

Thai travel and lifestyle television show

- Thai: เทยเที่ยวไทย The Route
- Genre: Travel; Lifestyle
- Presented by: Tachakorn Boonlupyanun; Kittipat Chalaragse; Jennie Panhan; Niti Chaichitathorn
- Country of origin: Thailand
- Original language: Thai
- No. of episodes: 593

Production
- Producer: Niti Chaichitathorn
- Production company: GMMTV

Original release
- Network: Bang Channel; One31; GMM 25
- Release: 8 October 2011 – 30 July 2023

Toey Tiew Thai (Thai: เทยเที่ยวไทย; RTGS: Thoei Thiao Thai, lit. 'kathoeys tour Thailand'), known in later installments as Toey Tiew Thai: The Route, was a Thai travel and lifestyle television show hosted by Tachakorn Boonlupyanun (Godji), Kittipat Chalaragse (Golf), Jennie Panhan and Niti Chaichitathorn (Pompam). Produced by GMMTV, the show premiered in Thailand on 8 October 2011 on Bang Channel then moved to One31 and eventually to GMM 25. Its last episode, the 593rd, was broadcast on 30 July 2023.

== Hosts ==
=== Main hosts ===
- Tachakorn Boonlupyanun (Godji)
- Kittipat Chalaragse (Golf)
- Jennie Panhan

=== Occasional host ===
- Niti Chaichitathorn (Pompam)
