= Water Boyy (TV series) =

2017 Thai television series

- Official series poster
- Genre: Boys' love; Romantic comedy; Teen drama; Sports
- Created by: GMMTV
- Based on: Water Boyy by Rachyd Kusolkulsiri
- Directed by: Rachyd Kusolkulsiri
- Starring: Pirapat Watthanasetsiri; Thitipoom Techaapaikhun; Nawat Phumphotingam; Charada Imraporn; Chatchawit Techarukpong; Sananthachat Thanapatpisal
- Opening theme: "พรุ่งนี้ทุกวัน" (Phrung Nee Thuk Wun) by Victor Chatchawit
- Ending theme: "อยู่ตรงนี้แล้วไม่มีใครรัก" (Yoo Trong Nee Laaw Mai Mee Krai Ruk) by Piglet Charada
- Country of origin: Thailand
- Original language: Thai
- No. of episodes: 14

Production
- Running time: 45 minutes
- Production company: GMMTV

Original release
- Network: GMM 25; Line TV
- Release: 9 April – 9 July 2017

Water Boyy is a 2017 Thai boys' love television series directed by Rachyd Kusolkulsiri and produced by GMMTV, starring Pirapat Watthanasetsiri (Earth), Thitipoom Techaapaikhun (New), Nawat Phumphotingam (White), Charada Imraporn (Piglet), Chatchawit Techarukpong (Victor) and Sananthachat Thanapatpisal (Fon). It is an adaptation of the 2015 film of the same name. The series was showcased by GMMTV in their 6 Natures+ event on 2 March 2017. It premiered on GMM 25 and LINE TV on 9 April 2017, airing on Sundays at 17:00 ICT and 19:00 ICT, respectively. The series concluded on 9 July 2017.

== Cast and characters ==
=== Main ===
- Pirapat Watthanasetsiri (Earth) as Waii
- Thitipoom Techaapaikhun (New) as Apo
- Nawat Phumphotingam (White) as Fah
- Charada Imraporn (Piglet) as Pan
- Chatchawit Techarukpong (Victor) as Min
- Sananthachat Thanapatpisal (Fon) as Wan

=== Supporting ===
- Weerayut Chansook (Arm) as Put
- Krittanai Arsalprakit (Nammon) as Sung
- Tanutchai Wijitvongtong (Mond) as Kluay
- Tytan Teepprasan as Achi
- Rutricha Phapakithi (Ciize) as Namkaeng
- Dom Hetrakul as Teer
- Jirakit Kuariyakul (Toptap) as Kan
- Phakjira Kanrattanasood (Nanan) as Mai
- Nattapat Sakullerphasuk (Fil) as George
- Sutthipha Kongnawdee (Noon) as Aom

=== Guest ===
- Surat Permpoonsavat (Yacht) as a bully

== Soundtrack ==
Song title	Romanized title	Artist	Ref.
พรุ่งนี้ทุกวัน	"Phrung Nee Thuk Wun"	Chatchawit Techarukpong (Victor)	
อยู่ตรงนี้แล้วไม่มีใครรัก	"Yoo Trong Nee Laaw Mai Mee Krai Ruk"	Charada Imraporn (Piglet)	
ผิดที่สำคัญตัว	"Pid Tee Sum Kun Tua"	Pol Nopwichai (Pete)	
