= Love Sick (Thai TV series) =

- Genre: Boys' love; Drama; Romance
- Directed by: Andy Rachyd Kusolkulsiri
- Starring: Chonlathorn Kongyingyong; Nawat Phumphotingam; Luangsodsai Anupart; Chindavanich Primrose; Charnmanoon Pannin
- Country of origin: Thailand
- Original language: Thai
- No. of seasons: 2
- No. of episodes: 48

Production
- Running time: 45 minutes

Original release
- Network: Channel 9
- Release: July 6, 2014 – October 10, 2015

Related
- Reminders (Thai TV Show)

Love Sick: The Series (Thai: รักวุ่น วัยรุ่นแสบ) is a Thai BL television series aired by Channel 9 since 2014. It is an adaptation of the original Thai Boys Love novel Love Sick: The Chaotic Lives of Blue Shorts Guys written by INDRYTIMES. The series stars Chonlathorn Kongyingyong, Nawat Phumphotingam, Luangsodsai Anupart, Chindavanich Primrose, Charnmanoon Pannin, and Vachiravit Paisarnkulwong.

The first season aired in Thailand on July 6, 2014, and ended on September 21, 2014. A second season was ordered to air in 2015 with 36 episodes, up from the 12 episodes in the first season. In April 2019, the main characters, Noh (Captain Chonlathorn) and Phun (Nawat Phumphothingam), appeared in the 3-part miniseries Reminders.

The first season of Love Sick is notable for adapting many tropes from Japanese yaoi and for beginning the boom in Thai series exploring "Boys Love".

A 2024 remake of the series titled Love Sick 2024 starring Progress Passawish Thamasungkeeti and Almond Poomsuwan Suwansatit premiered on Channel 9 and YouTube on September 14, 2024, at 23:00 ICT (11:00 pm).

== Plot summary ==
=== Season 1 (2014) ===
Lovesick The Series explores the experiences of students attending an all-male college called Friday College. The series centers on the budding love story between Noh, (Chonlathorn Kongyingyong) the president of Friday College's music club, and Phun, (Nawat Phumphotingam) the vice president of Friday College's student council.

Phun has a dilemma: despite having a girlfriend, his father insists on him dating the daughter of one of his friends. Phun decides to get his little sister, Pang, to help him convince their father to change his mind. Pang is obsessed with boy's love novels, so Phun comes up with a plan to win her support. He decides to convince Pang that he has a boyfriend.

Due to unforeseen circumstances, Noh discovers that his music club's budget is short, and they need money to purchase new drums. Noh rushes to the student council in search of help and finds Phun, the vice president of the student council. He lays out his case and Phun decides he has found the perfect candidate for his plan.

Phun asks Noh to be his fake boyfriend in exchange for help with his music club budget. Noh is unwilling at first, but when he shows up at Phun's house, the plan goes as Phun intended and Pang is convinced they are a couple. She agrees to help Phun with their father. Through the first season, the story revolves around the many adventures Noh and Phun encounter. Their relationship changes through these experiences and eventually, the two 17-year-old boys fall in love with each other.

Supporting Phun and Noh's story are:

- Jeed, a new student transferred from a public school to a private convent school across from Friday College. There she meets Aim who is Phun's current girlfriend, and Yuri, who is Noh's girlfriend. Jeed then meets Noh's friend, Khom/“Sharp”, and they fall in love. At the same time Jeed tries all she can to fit in with her new peers, and the couple struggles through the many expectations they encounter.
- Tangmo, a convent school student, and Moan, a technical school student who is a nephew of Friday College chancellor, live together at the same condominium as husband and wife. All their friends know about this, but their parents have no clue. Golf, Moan's best enemy, lives next to them and keeps their secret.
- Pang, Phun's little sister, who is a true Y-girl who loves imagining guys in a boy's love relationship. Her best friends, Madmee and Jiab, also share the love of Yaoi and they all go to the same acting school. There, Pang and friends meet Pop and Shay who are inevitably 'imagined' by the girls to be a couple, and the trio does everything to make sure Pop and Shay fall in love with each other, but things are not that easy.

Season 1 of Love Sick the Series ends with Phun and Noh deciding to step back from each other for the sake of their two girlfriends, whom they don't want to hurt with their affair.

=== Season 2 (2015) ===
The second season of Love Sick the Series starts with Noh and Phun deciding to be just friends. They both focus on prepping for Friday College's major soccer game event while keeping their relationship platonic. When the game ends, Noh, Phun, and their friends celebrate their win at a restaurant where Noh gets to meet Golf, a former student at Friday College.

Golf tells Noh about a disturbing indiscretion involving Aim, Phun's girlfriend. Golf asks Noh to tell his friend, Phun, about Aim's indiscretion, as it was the right thing to do as Phun's friend. Noh struggles with this information, and drinks too much ending up at Phun's house, farther confirming his relationship with Phun to Pang and her friends. Aim and Yuri then invite Phun and Noh on a couple vacation to Hua Hin in order to spend time together. During a quiet moment at Hua Hin, Noh is faced with evidence of Aim's indiscretion, confirming Golf's claims. Noh then starts worrying on how he will tell Phun the truth about his girlfriend without hurting him.

When Noh's friends throw an impromptu party at Noh's house, Phun shows up and accidentally stumbles on the evidence from Golf showing Aim's secret. Phun runs off, struggling to deal with Aim's betrayal, and Noh hurries to Phun's side, vowing to support him through the following hard time. Phun and Aim's relationship comes to an end soon after.

Phun and Noh keep their relationship status as friends for a while, until Noh's band performs at an Open House Event at the Girl's convent school. When most of the girls work to win Noh's heart, Phun decides to confess his feelings and asks Noh to be his boyfriend. They keep their relationship a secret, as Noh is not ready to let everyone know the nature of their relationship. Their secret relationship leads them into multiple misunderstandings with their friends and Noh's girlfriend, Yuri.

To end the fights and the hurt, Noh confesses his feelings to Phun, and decides to end his ambiguous relationship with Yuri. The day after Noh talks to Yuri, she witnesses an intimate scene between Phun and Noh that confirms Noh's feelings for Phun. Not being able to accept the truth, Yuri distances herself from Noh, which causes him great hurt.

Noh and Phun then navigate through the experiences of coming out as a gay couple to their friends, dealing with prejudices and in the case of Jeed, potential ostracization. The series comes to an end with Noh and Phun finally finding a balance and an acceptance of each other's experiences and feelings. They vow to stay together for as long as they can.

== Cast ==
Character	Portrayed by	Seasons	
Character	Portrayed by	1	2
Noh	Chonlathorn Kongyingyong	Main	Main
Phun	Nawat Phumphotingam	Main	Main
Earn	Luangsodsai Anupart	Recurring	Main
Pang	Nuchanart Veerakaarn	Main	Main
Aim	Chindavanich Primrose	Main	Main
Yuri	Charnmanoon Pannin	Main	Main
Jeed	Nungira Hanwutinanon	Main	Main
Pop	Ausavaterakul Ausavapat	Main	Main
Shay	Sirikiet Saejea	Main	Main
Khom	Nontapan Chuenwarin	Main	Main
Pete	Vachiravit Paisarnkulwong	Main	Main
Nueng	Vittawat Tichawanich	Main	Main
Taengmo/Mo	Sita Maharavidejakorn	Main	Main
Moan	Patcharawat Wongtossawati	Main	Main
Per	Cheewagaroon Harit	Recurring	Main
Ohm	Chupawit Dejyanakorn (season 1)/ Napian Permsombat (season 2)	Recurring	Main
Golf	Suppharoek Miphian (season 1)/ Moss Nattapol (season 2)	Recurring	Main
Mawin/Win	Phumphothingam Tharathon	—N/a	Main
Mick	Thitipat Pookboonsherd	—N/a	Main
Arm	Premanan Fifa	—N/a	Main
James	Chaiya Jirapirom	—N/a	Main
Aek	Rabbit Gameplay	—N/a	Main
Mark	Theewara Bank	—N/a	Main
Fi	TBA	Recurring	Recurring
Nongnan	Samantha Melanie Coates	Recurring	Recurring
Film	Arpornsutinan Chanagun	Recurring	Recurring
Grace	Manassanant Arkomdhon	Recurring	Recurring
Lhew	Nalurmas Sa-nguanpholphairot	Recurring	Recurring
Oil	Ngeonkham Kirati	—N/a	Guest

== Series Information ==
The twelve episodes of Love Sick the Series first season were made available on Netflix early 2018.

Captain Chonlathorn and White Nawat then appeared in the short omnibus series aired on Line TV, titled Reminders: Because I Miss You as Noh and Phun in April 2019. In Reminders, Noh and Phun are in university and still together. Reminders explores their struggle to make time for each other despite the demands of their classes, and a new social environment.

== Soundtrack ==
Here are the songs in this drama:

=== Track listing ===
No.	Title	Singer(s)	Length
1.	"Shake/Sun [สั่น]"	Sompob Pokepoon/Boy Sompob
2.	"Begging [ขอร้อง]"	Chonlathorn Kongyingyong/Captain
3.	"Did You Forget? [ลืมไปหรือเปล่า]"	Primrose Chindavanich
4.	"Pass [ผ่าน]"	Chanagun Arpornsutinan/Gunsmile
5.	"I Still Can't [ยังทำไม่ได้]"	Samantha Melanie Coates
6.	"Just Only That [แค่เท่านั้น]"	Ausavaterakul Ausavapat/New
7.	"If I Died [หากฉันตาย]"	Anik Kornkulchat & Pantita Kongsomtith
8.	"Is This Love?"	Various Artist
9.	"The Voice That Changed [เสียงที่เปลี่ยน]"	Luangsodsai Anupart/Ngern
10.	"Farsighted [สายตายาว]"	Various Artist
11.	"I Like You Both [อยากเก็บเธอไว้ทั้งสองคน]"	Vachiravit Paisarnkulwong/August
12.	"Don't Get Me Wrong [อย่าเข้าใจฉันผิด]"	Nalurmas Sa-nguanpholphairot, Nungira Hanwuthinanon/Gale & Manassanant Arkomdhon
13.	"Shake/Sun [สั่น]"	Various Artist
14.	"Door [ประตู]"	Tol Vonthongchai
15.	"Unconditional Love [รักไม่มีเงื่อนไข]"	Nat Sakdatorn & Tol Vonthongchai
16.	"My Love Never Changes [ไม่มีวันเปลี่ยน]"	Sompob Pokepoon/Boy Sompob
