= U-Prince =

2016–17 Thai television series

- Also known as: U-Prince: The Series
- Genre: Romantic comedy; Drama
- Created by: GMMTV
- Directed by: Chatkaew Susiwa; Kanittha Kwanyu
- Starring: See full list below
- Country of origin: Thailand
- Original language: Thai
- No. of seasons: 12 See full list below
- No. of episodes: 54 See full list below

Production
- Producer: Sataporn Panichraksapong
- Running time: 75 minutes
- Production companies: GMMTV; Baa-Ram-Ewe

Original release
- Network: GMM 25; LINE TV
- Release: 15 May 2016 – 2 July 2017

U-Prince is a 2016–2017 Thai television series produced by GMMTV together with Baa-Ram-Ewe. Directed by Chatkaew Susiwa and Kanittha Kwanyu, it is a twelve-season series based from Jamsai's novels on twelve stories of men coming from twelve different faculties of a university. Every season features a couple together with some of the recurring characters in the story.

Starting with a behind the scenes special episode on 15 May 2016, the series officially premiered on GMM 25 and LINE TV on 22 May 2016, airing on Sundays at 20:00 ICT (later, at 20:30 ICT on 4 June 2017 and onwards) and 22:00 ICT (later, at 22:30 ICT on 4 June 2017 and onwards), respectively. The series concluded on 2 July 2017.

== Synopsis ==
=== U-Prince: The Handsome Cowboy (season 1) ===
Bad boy Sibtis is a charming cowboy from the Faculty of Agriculture. He is Prikkang's first love, and she his. However, she has evolved into a grounded young woman who detests egotistical and conceited individuals. They get off to a bad start when they reunite. He attempts to win her over by taking her icy attitude as a challenge.

=== U-Prince: The Gentle Vet (season 2) ===
At the Faculty of Veterinary Science, Thesis is a second-year student. He encounters Suaysai, a girl who is terrified of rainy days. They develop a tight bond and become best friends. However, everything is complicated by Suaysai's phobia of the rain. Thus, even if Suaysai is harmed and they are split apart, Thesis chooses to shield her from everything she fears.

=== U-Prince: The Lovely Geologist (season 3) ===
T-Rex attends the Faculty of Science and is majoring in geology. He has a reputation for being an avid dinosaur enthusiast. He falls in love with a girl one day and makes the decision to follow her relentlessly, especially after learning that she is being mistreated by her boyfriend.

=== U-Prince: The Badass Baker (season 4) ===
Dash, a gifted chef and student at the Faculty of Culinary Arts, is in need of a new residence. On one condition, his pal T-Rex assists him in finding a new flat and roommate. Rene, a free-spirited girl who studies at the Faculty of Arts and writes novels, is that roommate. As they spend more time together, their initial lack of compatibility changes.

=== U-Prince: The Absolute Economist (season 5) ===
Frugal and lonely, Teddy meets flighty Chompink as she tries to embezzle school funds. He feels repulsed. However, as time goes on, he starts to understand that love is more significant than money. They will have to overcome numerous challenges in order to be together, despite all the love he feels.

=== U-Prince: The Foxy Pilot (season 6) ===
Hawk is a cranky student from the Faculty of Engineering studying aviation. He rarely shows emotion and is aloof. The owner of Palmer Airlines asks Hawk to become friends with his pampered daughter, the starlet Aurora, during his interview. She expects to be referred to as "Princess" and is conceited. However, she is also incredibly lonely and often hides her actual emotions beneath a grin.

=== U-Prince: The Playful Comm-Arts (season 7) ===
Sung dreams of making Kirun, from the comm-arts department, her boyfriend. Until one day, Sung was hit by a tricycle and made a promise with the god of death. The god of death sent her back to the mortal world and gave her some kind of divine power. But for some reason, every time she has physical contact with Kirun, Sung goes into trance.

=== U-Prince: The Extroverted Humanist (season 8) ===
Kiryu, a second-year student at the Faculty of Humanities, is gregarious and amiable. His junior, Pinyin, who moved from China, piques his curiosity. She has the exact opposite personality, though, being shy, apprehensive, introverted, and friendless. Pinyin initially finds Kiryu's intrusion to be too much to handle, but they gradually begin to fall in love.

=== U-Prince: The Single Lawyer (season 9) ===
The first student to receive all As in the Faculty of Law in the past ten years is Firstclass. The fact that collecting watches and clocks is one of his hobbies shows how serious and strict he is about being on time. Minute is a conceited, pampered, wealthy girl whose life falls apart when her family declares bankruptcy. She poses as the girlfriend of Firstclass's homosexual brother in order to survive. To live in their flat, she receives a monthly stipend. Nevertheless, it appears that Minute and Firstclass can't tolerate each other's company without fighting.

=== U-Prince: The Crazy Artist (season 10) ===
Theo, Melbe's lover, dumps her. She meets Hippy, the singer of a rock band, that same day. He wants her Beatles t-shirt, but he has to act like he's her boyfriend for five days in order to get it.

=== U-Prince: The Badly Politics (season 11) ===
Cherrymilk, a young fashion enthusiast, is compelled by her father's decree to pursue a degree in political science. Her father disciplined her when she was required to do an assignment by her teacher during class. She searches for Survey, a young man who is the only one with the answer to all of her issues, in order to survive. She eventually falls in love, but she finds out that he's getting married soon.

=== U-Prince: The Ambitious Boss (season 12) ===
The daughter of a Mafia boss, Mantou, hopes to marry the man she was betrothed to as a child after high school, but he has other plans, so her parents try to set up another marriage, this time to a man who is the son of another Mafia boss. At first, Mantou declines because she doesn't feel anything for Brian, not realizing that he has had a crush on her since they were young, but Brian tries to win her heart amid the ensuing jealousy, miscommunications, and potentially destructive conflict between Thailand's three main Mafia families.

== Cast and characters ==
=== U-Prince: The Handsome Cowboy ===
==== Main ====
- Puttichai Kasetsin (Push) as Sibtis
- Esther Supreeleela as Prikkang

==== Supporting ====
- Kunchanuj Kengkarnka (Kun) as Hippy
- Jirakit Thawornwong (Mek) as Hawk
- Chonlathorn Kongyingyong (Captain) as Kiryu
- Kanut Rojanai (Baan) as Key
- Natthapat Wipatkornthrakul (Puifai) as Pitta
- Jirakit Kuariyakul (Toptap) as Hed
- Nachat Juntapun (Nicky) as Ped
- Surasak Chaiat (Nu) as Sibtis' father
- Prakasit Bowsuwan as Prikkang's father

=== U-Prince: The Gentle Vet ===
==== Main ====
- Vorakorn Sirisorn (Kang) as Thesis
- Sutatta Udomsilp (Punpun) as Suaysai

==== Supporting ====
- Achirawich Saliwattana (Gun) as Punpun
- Pronpiphat Pattanasettanon (Plustor) as Lorthep
- Natapat Patipokasut (Miss) as Pete
- Sutthipha Kongnawdee (Noon) as Jelly
- Nontanun Anchuleepradit (Kacha) as T-Rex
- Chatchawit Techarukpong (Victor) as Dash
- Kunchanuj Kengkarnka (Kun) as Hippy

=== U-Prince: The Lovely Geologist ===
==== Main ====
- Nontanun Anchuleepradit (Kacha) as T-Rex
- Nachjaree Horvejkul (Cherreen) as Baiploo

==== Supporting ====
- Pronpiphat Pattanasettanon (Plustor) as Lorthep
- Vorakorn Sirisorn (Kang) as Thesis
- Chatchawit Techarukpong (Victor) as Dash
- Kunchanuj Kengkarnka (Kun) as Hippy
- Tipnaree Weerawatnodom (Namtan) as Bell
- Weerayut Chansook (Arm) as Hym
- Thanat Lowkhunsombat (Lee) as Survey

=== U-Prince: The Badass Baker ===
==== Main ====
- Chatchawit Techarukpong (Victor) as Dash
- Charada Imraporn (Piglet) as René

==== Supporting ====
- Nontanun Anchuleepradit (Kacha) as T-Rex
- Kunchanuj Kengkarnka (Kun) as Hippy
- Thanat Lowkhunsombat (Lee) as Survey
- Sananthachat Thanapatpisal (Fon) as Sung
- Jatuchoke Wangsuwannakit (Go) as Mark
- Oranicha Krinchai (Proud) as Annie

=== U-Prince: The Absolute Economist ===
==== Main ====
- Isariya Patharamanop (Hunz) as Teddy
- Focus Jeerakul as (Chompink / Chompoo)

==== Supporting ====
- Esther Supreeleela as Prikkang
- Thanat Lowkhunsombat (Lee) as Survey
- Thitipoom Techaapaikhun (New) as Pascal
- Nutticha Namwong (Kaykai) as Piglet
- Phadej Onlahoong as Tang Thai (Somsak)
- Poodit Chohksangiam as Tangmo (Somyot)
- Methika Jiranorraphat (Jane) as Loma
- Zuvapit Traipornworakit (Baitoei) as Aurora
- Khoo Pei-Cong (Wave) as François

=== U-Prince: The Foxy Pilot ===
==== Main ====
- Jirakit Thawornwong (Mek) as Hawk
- Zuvapit Traipornworakit (Baitoei) as Aurora

==== Supporting ====
- Chonlathorn Kongyingyong (Captain) as Kiryu
- Kunchanuj Kengkarnka (Kun) as Hippy
- Weerayut Chansook (Arm) as Him
- Thitipoom Techaapaikhun (New) as Pascal
- Methika Jiranorraphat (Jane) as Loma
- Khoo Pei-Cong (Wave) as François
- Tawan Vihokratana (Tay) as Philip
- Pluem Pongpisal as Kevin

=== U-Prince: The Playful Comm-Arts ===
==== Main ====
- Nawat Phumphotingam (White) as Kirun
- Sananthachat Thanapatpisal (Fon) as Sung

=== Supporting ===
- Chonlathorn Kongyingyong (Captain) as Kiryu
- Sutthipha Kongnawdee (Noon) as Jelly
- Tipnaree Weerawatnodom (Namtan) as Bell
- Weerayut Chansook (Arm) as Him
- Charada Imraporn (Piglet) as René
- Methika Jiranorraphat (Jane) as Loma
- Nawat Phumphotingam (White) as Kirun
- Phakjira Kanrattanasood (Nanan) as Dizzy
- Parichat Praihirun as Kirun and Kiryu's mother
- Pluem Pongpisal as Kevin

=== U-Prince: The Extroverted Humanist ===
==== Main ====
- Chonlathorn Kongyingyong (Captain) as Kiryu
- Jannine Weigel (Ploychompoo) as Pinyin

==== Supporting ====
- Jirakit Thawornwong (Mek) as Hawk
- Kunchanuj Kengkarnka (Kun) as Hippy
- Weerayut Chansook (Arm) as Him
- Methika Jiranorraphat (Jane) as Loma
- Nawat Phumphotingam (White) as Kirun
- Vachiravit Paisarnkulwong (August) as Firstclass
- Parichat Praihirun as Kirun and Kiryu's mother
- Lapisara Intarasut (Apple) as Minute
- Pimolwan Suphayang as Pinyin's mother
- Suradet Piniwat (Bas) as Set
- Pluem Pongpisal as Kevin

=== U-Prince: The Single Lawyer ===
==== Main ====
- Vachiravit Paisarnkulwong (August) as Firstclass
- Lapisara Intarasut (Apple) as Minute

==== Supporting ====
- Chonlathorn Kongyingyong (Captain) as Kiryu
- Sutthipha Kongnawdee (Noon) as Jelly
- Tipnaree Weerawatnodom (Namtan) as Bell
- Weerayut Chansook (Arm) as Him
- Isariya Patharamanop (Hunz) as Teddy
- Focus Jeerakul as Chompink (Chompoo)
- Methika Jiranorraphat (Jane) as Loma
- Nawat Phumphotingam (White) as Kirun
- Thanaboon Wanlopsirinun (Na) as Pitcher

=== U-Prince: The Crazy Artist ===
==== Main ====
- Kunchanuj Kengkarnka (Kun) as Hippy
- Note Panayanggool as Melbe

==== Supporting ====
- Pluem Pongpisal as Kevin
- Phurikulkrit Chusakdiskulwibul (Amp) as Theo
- Puttichai Kasetsin (Push) as Sibtis
- Jirakit Thawornwong (Mek) as Hawk
- Chonlathorn Kongyingyong (Captain) as Kiryu
- Kunchanuj Kengkarnka (Kun) as Hippy
- Tipnaree Weerawatnodom (Namtan) as Bell
- Weerayut Chansook (Arm) as Him
- Thitipoom Techaapaikhun (New) as Pascal
- Methika Jiranorraphat (Jane) as Loma

=== U-Prince: The Badly Politics ===
==== Main ====
- Thanat Lowkhunsombat (Lee) as Survey
- Lapassalan Jiravechsoontornkul (Mild) as Cherry Milk

==== Supporting ====
- Sutthipha Kongnawdee (Noon) as Jelly
- Nontanun Anchuleepradit (Kacha) as T-Rex
- Tipnaree Weerawatnodom (Namtan) as Bell
- Weerayut Chansook (Arm) as Him
- Methika Jiranorraphat (Jane) as Loma
- Maripha Siripool (Wawa) as Kwangnoi
- Pattadon Janngeon (Fiat) as Fuse
- Krittanai Arsalprakit (Nammon) as Aob
- Paiboonkiat Kiewkaew as Andres
- Rachanee Siralert (Prae) as Regina Elisa
- Napasorn Weerayuttvilai (Puimek) as Princess Karin
- Chutavuth Pattarakampol (March) as Brian

=== U-Prince: The Ambitious Boss ===
==== Main ====
- Chutavuth Pattarakampol (March) as Brian
- Worranit Thawornwong (Mook) as Mantou

==== Supporting ====
- Jirakit Thawornwong (Mek) as Hawk
- Nontanun Anchuleepradit (Kacha) as T-Rex
- Chatchawit Techarukpong (Victor) as Dash
- Tipnaree Weerawatnodom (Namtan) as Bell
- Weerayut Chansook (Arm) as Him
- Thanat Lowkhunsombat (Lee) as Survey
- Pluem Pongpisal as Kevin
- Charada Imraporn (Piglet) as René
- Isariya Patharamanop (Hunz) as Teddy
- Methika Jiranorraphat (Jane) as Loma
- Nawat Phumphotingam (White) as Kirun
- Sivakorn Lertchuchot (Guy) as Otto
- Jumpol Adulkittiporn (Off) as Li Tang
- Chanagun Arpornsutinan (Gunsmile) as Tanthai

=== Guest ===
- Alysaya Tsoi as Sylvia
- Korawit Boonsri as Cholly

== Production ==
=== Casting ===
In early 2016, GMMTV hosted the Finding U-Prince Project, an online contest to recruit actors for the said television series. The results were announced on 3 April 2016 at the Eden Square, CentralWorld.

== Series overview ==
Series overview
| Series | Episodes | Originally released | |
| Series | Episodes | First released | Last released |
|---|---|---|---|
| U-Prince: The Handsome Cowboy | 8 | 22 May 2016 | 10 July 2016 |
| U-Prince: The Gentle Vet | 4 | 17 July 2016 | 7 August 2016 |
| U-Prince: The Lovely Geologist | 4 | 14 August 2016 | 4 September 2016 |
| U-Prince: The Badass Baker | 4 | 11 September 2016 | 2 October 2016 |
| U-Prince: The Absolute Economist | 4 | 9 October 2016 | 11 December 2016 |
| U-Prince: The Foxy Pilot | 4 | 8 December 2016 | 8 January 2017 |
| U-Prince: The Playful Comm-Arts | 4 | 15 January 2017 | 5 February 2017 |
| U-Prince: The Extroverted Humanist | 4 | 12 February 2017 | 5 March 2017 |
| U-Prince: The Single Lawyer | 4 | 12 March 2017 | 2 April 2017 |
| U-Prince: The Crazy Artist | 4 | 9 April 2017 | 30 April 2017 |
| U-Prince: The Badly Politics | 4 | 7 May 2017 | 28 May 2017 |
| U-Prince: The Ambitious Boss | 4 | 4 June 2017 | 2 July 2017 |

== Soundtrack ==
- Note Panayanggool - Ror hai tur poot gaun (opening theme season 1, season 2 - episodes 1-2 and season 3)
- Tanont Chumroen - Chep thi yang rusuek
- Worranit Thawornwong - Mai tummadah
- Vonthongchai Intarawat - Dae thoe thirak
- Vorakorn Sirisorn - Fai diao (opening theme season 2 - episodes 3–4)
- Kunchanuj Kengkarnka - Khuen thi fa sawang
- Nontanun Anchuleepradit - Roy yim kaung tur
- Chatchawit Techarukpong - My Beautiful Girl (opening theme season 4)
- Charada Imraporn - Kwahm wahn (Sweet)
- Isariya Patharamanop and Focus Jeerakul - an pai... rue plao (opening theme season 5)
- Jirakit Thawornwong - Poot wah rak bao bao (opening theme season 6)
- Chonlathorn Kongyingyong - Tah tur mai roo (opening theme seasons 7–8)
- Saranyu Winaipanit - Garoonah mah rop guan (opening theme season 9)
- Kunchanuj Kengkarnka - Grasoon (opening theme season 10)
- Kunchanuj Kengkarnka - Wun tee chun aht leum
- Weerayut Chansook - Gumlung ror yoo por dee (opening theme season 11)
- Sivakorn Lertchuchot - Arai gor dai nai jai tur (opening theme season 12)
- Worranit Thawornwong - Arai gor dai nai jai tur

== Awards and nominations ==
| Year | Award | Category | Recipient | Result | Ref. |
|---|---|---|---|---|---|
| 2017 | Maya Awards 2017 | Female rising star | Zuvapit Traipornworakit | Won | |
| 2018 | Daradaily The Great Awards 2018 | Male Star of the Year | Thanat Lowkhunsombat | Nominated | |
