= Chonlathorn Kongyingyong =

Thai actor (born 1998)

- ชลธร คงยิ่งยง
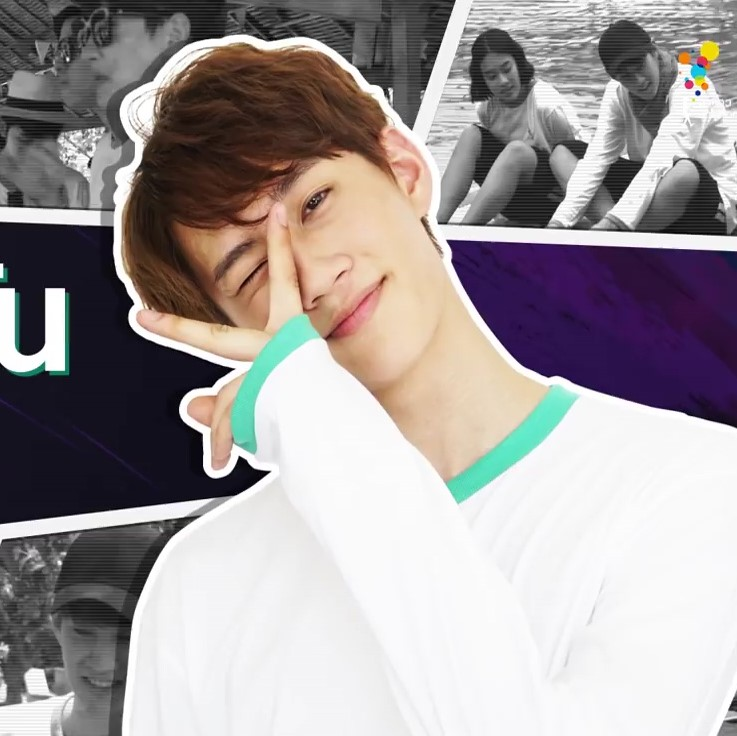
- Chonlathorn in 2017
- Born: 2 February 1998 (age 28); Bangkok, Thailand
- Other name: Captain (กัปตัน)
- Education: Srinakharinwirot University
- Occupations: Actor; singer
- Years active: 2014–present
- Agent: Nadao Bangkok (2014-2022)
- Known for: In Family We Trust, Achilles Curse and the Curse of the Treasure, Coin Digger and Blackout.

Chonlathorn Kongyingyong (Thai: ชลธร คงยิ่งยง, RTGS: Chonlathon Khongyingyong; born 2 February 1998), nicknamed Captain (Thai: กัปตัน), is a Thai actor, best known for his debut lead role in Love Sick, a TV adaptation of a popular yaoi novel. He graduated from Mahidol University International Demonstration School and studied Social Communication Innovation at Srinakharinwirot University. He acted in school dramas U-Prince, Love Songs Love Series and the Secret Seven after his successful run in Lovesick the series. In 2018, he played Earn in the In Family We Trust drama. In 2019, he joined fellow members of Nine by Nine in the school drama Great Men Academy. Captain also returned to his role as Noh from Love Sick The Series in the short three-part miniseries, Reminders.

As a singer, Captain sang three songs in Love Sick The Series, U-Prince and Water Boyy. In 2018, Captain joined Thai Boy Group NINE BY NINE ( 9by9 or 9x9 ). Nine by Nine had their debut in November 2018 for their mini-album En-Route. Captain and the members of Nine by Nine then embarked on a nationwide tour to promote the band's album that concluded with a Finale Concert in March 2019. As a member of NINE BY NINE, Captain has sung 'Night Light', 'Hypnotize', 'Shouldn't', 'The Lucky One' (Great Men Academy OST), and 'Eternity'.

Captain's recent works include the Thai Film Achilles Curse and the Curse of the Treasure (2024), Coin Digger (2023), and Thai Drama You Are My Universe (2023).

== Acting ==
Beginning: Love Sick the Series.

Captain's first role was in Love Sick. He portrays Noh, one of the main characters, in the popular boy's love series. Like most of the actors in the show, he was discovered in an open-casting call. The first season of Love Sick had a total of 12 Episodes. Its popularity prompted a Second Season with 36 episodes. Captain's role as Noh endeared him to many and won him awards, such as the Kazz Awards 2015's Most Popular Shipped Couple of the Year (Captain and White (co-star)), and also, Kazz Awards 2016's Most Popular Couple (White/Captain).

Captain also sang a song for the Love Sick Soundtrack named Begging [ขอร้อง].

U-Prince

In 2016, Captain took on the role of Kiryu in the popular school drama, U-Prince. He first appears in a supporting role in two of the U-PRINCE Series parts, culminating in Kiryu's 4-episode part. In U-PRINCE the series: The Extroverted Humanist, Captain plays Kiryu Weller, an outgoing second-year student from the Faculty of Humanities. He becomes interested in Pinyin, his junior who transferred from China. Pinyin has an introverted personality – she's anxious, doesn't make friends easily and is very shy. When they first meet, Pinyin finds Kiryu's extroverted nature too hard to deal with, but then they start liking each other. U-PRINCE the series: The Extroverted Humanist had four episodes. It aired on February 12, 2017 - March 5, 2017 on the GMM 25 Network.

Love Songs Love Series and Secret Seven Era

1n 2016, Captain joined the cast of Love Songs Love Series: Summer (2016), also known as Love Songs Love Series ตอน ฤดูร้อน. He played a supporting role as Pat. The series had six episodes that ran on GMM 25 Network, from May 4, 2016 to May 19, 2016. In 2017, Captain was then cast in the main role of Love Songs Love Series: Small Boats Should Leave (2017). He plays the role of Tun in four episodes that aired from May 7, 2017 - May 28, 2017 on the GMM 25 Network.

On August 19, 2017, Captain took on the role of Neo, in Secret Seven: Thoe Khon Ngao Kap Khao Thang Chet (from Thai: เธอคนเหงากับเขาทั้งเจ็ด). A 12-episode school romantic drama about Padlom (Sutatta Udomsilp), a lonely girl who's afraid of love. One day, she finds out that one of seven young men secretly likes her. Captain plays the role of Neo, who is number seven on the list.

NINE by NINE and In Family We Trust

In 2018, Captain became one of the members of Thai Boy Group NINE BY NINE under 4Nologue. He was then cast in the role of Earn in 4Nologue's drama project In Family We Trust. Ern is Phatson's second son, who helps manage the Pattaya hotel's theater. Captain and the members of NINE by NINE played the roles of the grandsons in the drama.

Great Men Academy & ReminderS

In February to March 2019, Captain joined members of NINE BY NINE in the LINE TV show Great Men Academy, also known as Great Men Academy สุภาพบุรุษสุดที่เลิฟ, a LINE TV Originals production. He played the role of Sean.

In April 2019, Captain appeared in the short drama, Reminders, reprising his role as Noh from Love Sick. Reminders is a three-part omnibus directed by New Siwaj Sawatmaneekul, with the final episode airing at the Millennial's Choice 2019 Fan meeting ReminderS.

Eat with Captain & the Human Error Project August 2019 saw Captain appear in a Reality Series created by Nadao Bangkok called Eat with Captain. The Eat with Captain series was made available on Nadao Bankgok's YouTube Channel. Captain visits restaurants in Thailand, showcasing different types of delicacies, coffee and drinks.

Captain then appeared in the Human Error Project in November 2019. The Human Error Project is the production of three films and three songs by three artists. Captain plays a supporting role in two of the films in the project, and the main role in his own short film, White Captain.

In 2021, Captain appeared in Blackout, a Thai thriller/drama series running on AIS Play. Blackout is about a group of friends who wake up with no memory after a blackout. They must find out what happened to them the night before in order to find their way out of a secret bar. Captain plays the role of A.

Captain returned in 2022 with the second season of Eat with Captain on his personal YouTube Channel. The series was three episodes long, as he continues to visit restaurants in Thailand. He also appeared in Oh, Teacher Kong, in a guest role as Porsche in ep. 39.

In 2023, Captain joined the cast of You Are My Universe on Channel 3, playing as Win. He also appeared in Amazon Prime's Coin Digger playing a main role as Get. He also had a guest role in the Thai Drama To The Moon and Back, acting as Purim's Mentee in Episode 12.

Achilles Curse and the Curse of Treasure

In 2024, Captain took the next step forward and appeared in a major role in the movie Achilles Curse: The Curse of Treasure. He played Gin. The movie was released in Thailand on September 12, 2024. In a candid interview with Men's Folio - Thailand Magazine, Captain said he welcomed the role in a film, and enjoyed discovering and exploring his character's style.

Captain has been cast as Dr. Kan in a Thai remake of the Korean Drama Mouse.

== Singing ==
Captain sang 'Begging [ขอร้อง]' in the Love Sick The Series soundtrack, and 'Tah Tur Mai Roo (OST. U-PRINCE Series)' for the U-PRINCE series soundtrack. He also sang, "My World Has Only You [โลกฉันมีแค่เธอ]" for the Water Boyy Thai LGBT film Soundtrack.

Captain joined Thai Boy Group NINE BY NINE (ไนน์บายนาย), also stylized as 9by9 and 9×9. The Thai Boy Group debuted on November 9, 2018. In February 2019, Captain toured as one of the NINE by NINE members in a tour dubbed: 9 x 9 THAILAND TOUR: ROUTE TO THE DESTINATION. The group performed in various provinces in Thailand for their fans.

NINE by NINE was a pilot crossover project in cooperation with Nadao Bangkok and GMM Grammy’s MBO. 4Nologue’s chief executive Anuwat “Wutt” Wichiennarat recruited nine boys – Thanapob “Tor” Leeratanakajorn, Teeradon “James” Supapunpinyo, Chonlathorn “Captain” Kongyingyong, Lapat “Third” Ngamchaweng, Sivakorn “Porche” Adulsuttikul, Jakrin “Jackie” Kungwankiertichai, Kritsanapoom “JJ" Pibulsonggram, Paris "Ice" Inthonkomansut, and Vachirawich "Ryu" Aranthanawong, for his group, Nine by Nine, or 9x9.

NINE BY NINE then had their last concert dubbed: 9x9 THE FINAL CONCERT: EN [D] ROUTE on March 9, 2019, and disbanded with one final song called “Eternity”. In May 2019, NINE by NINE then won the KAZZ Magazine 2019 Award for Rising Stars.

In November 2019, Captain was part of the HUMAN ERROR project. The HUMAN ERROR project is a compilation of three short movies and three songs by three artists, that is Jaylerr, Captain and Paris. The titles of the short films are BLUE for Jayler, WHITE for Captain and RED for Paris. Captain appears as supporting actor in two of the films, and as lead in his own short film titled, 'White Captain'. Captain's song in the project is titled 'Color Blind'.

The Color Blind music video directed by Songyos Sugmakanan dropped on November 28, 2019, on Line TV Original Album.

== Personal life ==
Captain graduated from Mahidol University International Demonstration School and enrolled in the Faculty of Social Communication Innovation at Srinakharinwirot University. He graduated with a Bachelor's Degree in November 2020. He has a passion for photography, saying he loves taking candid photos of people on the street most. Captain's photography hobby gave him a chance to try out a photo shoot with ElleThailand. He also has a deep love for art. His hobbies also include listening to music.

== Filmography ==
TV Series
Year	Title	Role	Network
2014	Love Sick (seasons one and two)	Noh	Channel 9 (MCOT)
2016	Love Songs Love Series: Summer	Pat	GMM 25
2017	Love Songs Love Series: Small Boats should leave	Tun	GMM 25
2017	U-Prince:The Single Lawyer	Kiryu Weller	GMM 25
2017	U-Prince - The Crazy Artist	Kiryu Weller	GMM 25
2017	U-Prince the Series - The Extroverted Humanist	Kiryu Weller	GMM 25
2017	Secret Seven the Series	Neo	ONE 31
2018	In Family We Trust	Ern	ONE 31
2019	Great Men Academy	Sean	LINE TV
2019	Reminders	Noh	LINE TV
2019	Human Error: Short Films - White Captain	Himself	LINE TV
2021	Blackout	A	AIS Play
2022	Oh, Teacher Kong	Porsche (Guest Role, Ep. 39)	Workpoint TV
2023	You Are My Universe	Win	Channel 3
2023	Coin Digger	Get	Amazon Prime
2023	To The Moon and Back	Purim's Mentee (Guest Role, Ep. 12)	Channel 3
2025	Mouse	Kan	TrueID

Movies
Year	Title	Role	Director	Box office
2024	Achilles Curse and the Curse of Treasure	Gin	Benz Pongchinnartham	Thailand

Music Videos
Year	Title	Singer	Label
2017	Kon Bap Nai Dee (OST. Secret Seven)	Bambam the Voice	GMM Grammy
2017	I Found You (Kacha Version)	Kacha Nontanun	GMM Grammy
2017	Tah Tur Mai Roo (OST. U-Prince the series)	Captain Chonlathorn	GMM Grammy
2018	Night Light	Nine by Nine	4nologue
2018	Hypnotize	Nine by Nine	4nologue
2019	The Lucky One	Nine by Nine	4nologue
2019	Shouldn't	Nine by Nine	4nologue
2019	Eternity	Nine by Nine	4nologue
2019	Color Blind	Captain Chonlathorn	GMM Grammy/Line TV/ Nadao Music
2020	Kui bpai gòn	Captain Chonlathorn	Nadao Music

Variety Shows
Year	Title	Role	Network
2019	School Rangers (Ep. 87 & 88)	Himself	GMMTV
2019	Eat With Captain	Himself	Nadao Bangkok YouTube Channel
2022	Eat with Captain Season 2	Himself	Chonlathorn Kongyingyong (Captain) YouTube Channel

== Discography ==
Soundtracks
Year	Title	Details	
2014	Begging [ขอร้อง]	Love Sick the Series OST	Bec-Tero
2015	My World Has Only You	Water Boyy the Film OST	
2017	Tah Tur Mai Roo	U-Prince the Series OST	GMM Grammy
2017	I Found You by Kacha Another (with Captain)	KACHA Another	GMM Grammy

Music Albums
Year	Album title	Project name	Details	Label
2018	En Route	Nine by Nine (9x9, 9by9th, or NINE by NINE) Thai Boy Band	Song List: Night Light; Hypnotize; Shouldn't; The Lucky One (Great Men Academy OST); Eternity	4nologue; Nadao Bangkok; GMM Grammy
2019	Human Error	Human Error: 3 Songs, 3 Short Films (Jaylerr, Captain, Paris)	Short Film - White Captain Song Title - Color Blind	LINETV Original Album; GMM Grammy; Nadao Music

=== Commercials ===
- AIS Calling Melody
- Oishi
- SnackJack
- YAMAHA QBIX
- Samsung Thailand

== Awards ==
- Kazz Awards 2015 - White & Captain won the most popular shipped couple of the year
- Kazz Awards 2016 - Most Popular Couple for White/Captain
- Kazz Awards 2016 - Most Popular Teen actor
- Kazz Awards 2017 - Most Popular Teen actor
- Kazz Awards 2017 - Youth of The Year
