= Vittawat Tichawanich =

Thai politician (born 1995)

- วิทวัส ติชะวาณิชย์

Member of the House of Representatives
- Incumbent
- Assumed office 4 July 2023
- Preceded by: Charnwit Wipoosiri

Personal details
- Born: April 15, 1995 (age 31) Bangkok, Thailand
- Party: People's (2024–present)
- Other political affiliations: Move Forward Party (2023–2024)

Vittawat Tichawanich (Thai: วิทวัส ติชะวาณิชย์, born 15 April 1995), nicknamed Palm (Thai: ปาล์ม) is a Thai actor and politician who served as a Bangkok Member of the House of Representatives for the People's Party.

== Early life ==
Vittawat Tichawanich was born on 15 April 1995 in Bangkok, Thailand. He studied his early highschool at Satit Bilingual School at Rangsit University. He later exchange to the Northridge High School and Nampa Christian Schools for three years. He then studied at Thammasat University and then earned Bachelor of Arts degree in Business English Communicatio from the Faculty of Liberal Arts. During his university years, he worked as an actor in many films and television series, such as Love Sick: The Series in 2014.

== Career ==
Tichawanich started his political career when he run as the candidate for the Bangkok 15th constituency for the Move Forward Party. He then ran a campaign focused on community welfare for the citizens after the COVID-19 pandemic. On 14 May 2023, he won the sit and then started to run his office as a Member of the House of Representatives for the 26th Parliament on 4 July 2023 from the 2023 Thai general election.

In 2024, the party he was in dissolved and became the People's Party. He got re-elected in 2026 Thai general election with 37,321 votes, outwinning the other 14 candidates.
