= Weerayut Chansook =

Thai actor, singer and host (born 1991)

- วีรยุทธ จันทร์สุข
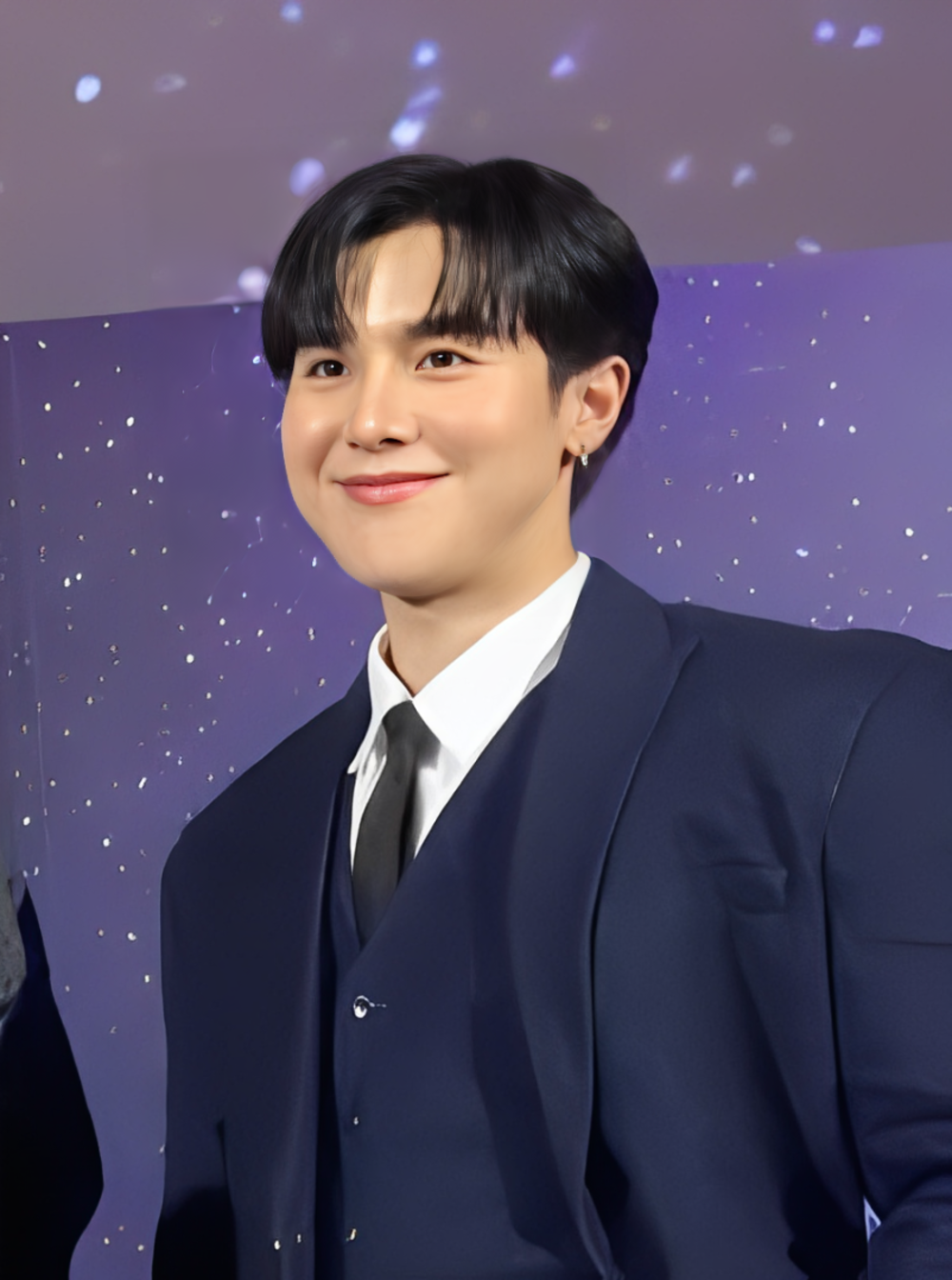
- Weerayut in January 2025
- Born: 30 October 1991 (age 35); Nakhon Pathom, Thailand
- Other name: Arm
- Education: Srinakharinwirot University; Faculty of Fine Arts (B.F.A.)
- Occupations: Actor, host, singer, MC, YouTuber
- Years active: 2010–present
- Agent: GMMTV
- Known for: Him in U-Prince; Putt in Water Boyy; Pop in Friend Zone 2: Dangerous Area

Weerayut Chansook (Thai: วีรยุทธ จันทร์สุข; born 30 October 1991), nicknamed Arm (Thai: อาร์ม), is a Thai actor, host and singer. He is known for his guest role as Pop in GMMTV's Friend Zone 2: Dangerous Area (2020) and support roles as Him in U-Prince (2016) and Putt in Water Boyy (2017). He also hosts several shows such as School Rangers, Arm Share and Friend Club.

== Early life and education ==
Weerayut was born in Nakhon Pathom Province, Thailand and is the third among four siblings. He completed his secondary education at Phrapathom Wittayalai School. In 2015, he graduated with a bachelor's degree in fine arts, major in acting and directing from the Faculty of Fine Arts at Srinakharinwirot University.

== Career ==
In 2007, he participated in the Luk Thung Star Contest. He won as first runner-up in the said competition and later enrolled in a singing school. He started in the entertainment industry in 2010 as an artist under RS. With his singing and dancing abilities, he was selected to be a member of Rookie BB, a boy band under the management of RS Music, together with Sittha Sapanuchart (Iang) and Supasit Chinvinijkul (Pop). Aside from singing, Weerayut also had a passion for hosting and modelling.

Weerayut joined GMMTV in 2016 where he debuted as an actor in Senior Secret Love: Bake Me Love (2016) as he played the support role of San. He later landed acting roles in several television series such as U-Prince (2016–2017), Water Boyy (2017), YOUniverse (2018), Mint To Be (2018) and Love at First Hate (2018).

Representing his home county, he performed together with his fellow GMMTV artist Phurikulkrit Chusakdiskulwibul (Amp) in South Korea during the 2018 DMC Festival, an annual event organized by Munhwa Broadcasting Corporation (MBC).

He has also been recently known for his fashion and styling skills through his lifestyle program Arm Share.

== Filmography ==
=== Television series ===
Key
†	Denotes television productions that have not yet been released

Year	Title	Role	Notes	Ref.
2016	Senior Secret Love: Bake Me Love	San	Support role	
2016	U-Prince:The Lovely Geologist	Him	Support role	
2016	U-Prince: Foxy Pilot	Him	Guest role	
2017	U-Prince: The Playful Comm-Arts	Him	Guest role	
2017	U-Prince:The Extroverted Humanist	Him	Support role	
2017	Water Boyy	Putt	Support role	
2017	U-Prince:The Crazy Artist	Him	Support role	
2017	U-Prince: The Badly Politics	Him	Support role	
2017	U-Prince: The Ambitious Boss	Him	Support role	
2017	Secret Seven	Play's guitarist	Support role	
2018	YOUniverse	Ice cream shop owner	Guest role	
2018	Mint To Be	Oat	Support role	
2018	Love at First Hate	Tawan	Support role	
2018	Our Skyy	Good	Support role	
2019	Wolf	Tiger	Guest role	
2019	Endless Love	Danthai	Support role	
2019	The Sand Princess	Chot	Support role	
2020	Fai Sin Chua	—N/a	Guest role	
2020	Friend Zone 2: Dangerous Area	Pop	Main role	
2020	Wake Up Ladies: Very Complicated	Jonathan (Jo)	Main role	
2021	55:15 Never Too Late	Bomb	Support role	
2024	We Are	Oh	Guest role	
2024	Pluto	Ton	Support role	
2026	My Romance Scammer	Prem	Support role	
2026	Match Point	Ming Thiticharoen	Support role	
TBA	Heartbound †	TBA	Support role	

=== Television show ===
Year	Title	Role	Notes	Ref.
2018–2024	School Rangers	Himself	Main host	
2019–present	Arm Share	Himself	Main host	
2020	Friend Drive	Himself	Main host	
2020	Beauty & The Babes (Season 3)	Himself	Main host	

== Discography ==
Year	Song Title	Label	Ref.
2010	"Follow U Follow Me" as part of Rookie BB	RS Music	
2010	"ยิ่งใกล้ ยิ่งไกล" (Ying Klai Ying Klai) as part of Rookie BB	RS Music	
2011	"โทรมาฐานะเพื่อน" (Tho Ma Thana Phuean) as part of Rookie BB	RS Music	
2011	"ไม่รู้จัก แต่รักแล้ว" (Mai Ruchak Tae Rak Laeo) as part of Rookie BB	RS Music	
2012	"แฟนเก่า อย่าเอาอย่าง" (Faen Kao Ya Aoyang) as part of Rookie BB	RS Music	
2016	"รัก เถอะ" (Rak Tur)	GMMTV Records	
2016	"รอเธอเปิด" (Ror Tur Pert)	GMMTV Records	
2017	"กำลังรออยู่พอดี" (Kamlang Ror Yoo Por Dee)	GMMTV Records	
2020	"ถ้าเธอลองเป็นฉัน" (Tha Tur Long Pen Chan)	GMMTV Records	

== MC ==
Television

- 2011 : Boy Series On Air Channel 5
- 2011 : Rookie BB Follow U Follow Me พุธ 16.00 น. On Air YAAK TV (2011–2012)
- 2011 : 2 Nite Live ซีซั่นที่ 3 On Air Channel 5
- 2013 : You Handsome On Air You Channel

Online

- 2020 : AWC VLOG EP.1 On Air YouTube:AWC STUDIO
