= Fireboy and Watergirl =

Puzzle-platform video game series

- Cover art for the first game
- Genre: Puzzle-platform
- Developer: Oslo Albet
- Platforms: Shockwave Flash, later HTML5
- First release: Fireboy and Watergirl in the Forest Temple; 19 November 2009
- Latest release: Fireboy and Watergirl and Friends; 29 April 2026

Fireboy and Watergirl (stylized as Fireboy & Watergirl) is a video game franchise developed and published by indie game developer Oslo Albet using the discontinued multimedia software platform Adobe Flash, converted to HTML5. The game features the titular main characters Fireboy and Watergirl as they traverse through multiple temples.

The series originated with Fireboy & Watergirl in the Forest Temple, a free-to-play flash game for PC released in 2009, which was developed solely by Albet.

== History ==
=== Origin ===
Release timeline
2009	Fireboy & Watergirl in the Forest Temple
2010	Fireboy & Watergirl 2: In the Light Temple
2011
2012	Fireboy & Watergirl 3: In the Ice Temple
2013
2014	Fireboy & Watergirl 4: In the Crystal Temple
2015
2016
2017
2018	Fireboy & Watergirl: Elements
2019
2020
2021	Fireboy & Watergirl: Fairy Tales
2022
2023
2024
2025
2026	Fireboy & Watergirl and Friends

The Fireboy and Watergirl series began with the release of Fireboy & Watergirl in the Forest Temple, a 2D puzzle-platform video game. Fireboy & Watergirl in the Forest Temple is the first-ever game in the series, developed and released as an independent game by Oslo Albet. On 19 November 2009, Albet had released Fireboy & Watergirl in the Forest Temple, a free-to-play flash game including multiple levels, exploration, and puzzle solving. The game's story follows the titular main characters, Fireboy and Watergirl as they progress through the Forest Temple.

=== Main series ===
Fireboy & Watergirl in the Forest Temple is the first installment of the Fireboy & Watergirl series. It received universal acclaim, leading to the release of a second installment, Fireboy & Watergirl 2: In the Light Temple in October 2010. Another sequel titled Fireboy & Watergirl 3: In the Ice Temple was released in 2012. A third sequel titled Fireboy & Watergirl 4: In the Crystal Temple was released in 2014. The fifth game in the series, titled Fireboy & Watergirl: Elements, was released in 2018. The sixth game, Fireboy & Watergirl: Fairy Tales, was released in 2021. The seventh game, Fireboy & Watergirl and Friends, was released in 2026.

== Gameplay ==
Fireboy and Watergirl is a cooperative puzzle-platform game. Fireboy is moved by using the arrow keys, while Watergirl is moved using the WASD keys. Only Fireboy can go through lava, whereas only Watergirl can go through water. If either Fireboy or Watergirl touch the opposite element, they will die, resulting in a game over. Green acid kills both characters, and therefore must be avoided. Red and blue diamonds can be collected by the character of the given color, and mechanisms like levers and buttons will have to be operated carefully in order for both characters to complete the level. Once a level is completed, a chart depicting how many diamonds were collected throughout the level will be revealed to the player(s), as well as their rank.

== Development and release ==
Oslo Albet started developing Fireboy and Watergirl because he had "always found puzzle games to be fascinating". Albet finalized the game mechanics before creating characters, as he was more interested in the gameplay. He said it was "pretty obvious" that he required two characters with opposing elements for the game to feel natural to players and designed Fireboy first before spending "quite a bit of time" finding the right design for Watergirl. After several changes, he designed Watergirl's "waterfall" ponytail to counter Fireboy's fiery hair. He added that when developing the story and characters he knew that they had to appeal to "boys, girls and families as a whole".

The first game in the series, Fireboy and Watergirl in the Forest Temple, was released in November 2009 on the software platform Adobe Flash and hosted on the online web portal Cool Math Games as the game's target demographic was people aged 10-15 years old. Adobe Flash was set to be discontinued in 2020. Still, the company confirmed that they'd continue to operate Flash games. The games were later converted into HTML5 to allow for easier usage on the site. The fifth game in the series, Fireboy and Watergirl: Elements, was released on Microsoft Store on December 9, 2018, later on Google Play on December 20, 2018, Apple App Store sometime in 2018 and Steam on January 24, 2019. The sixth game in the series, Fireboy and Watergirl: Fairy Tales, was released on Google Play on September 29, 2021, Steam on November 1, 2021 and Apple App Store in 2023. The seventh game in the series, Fireboy & Watergirl and Friends, was released on Google Play and Steam on April 29, 2026.

On September 1, 2026, Fireboy and Watergirl 1-4 were rereleased on Steam.

== Games ==
1. Fireboy & Watergirl in the Forest Temple (2009)
2. Fireboy & Watergirl 2: In the Light Temple (2010)
3. Fireboy & Watergirl 3: In the Ice Temple (2012)
4. Fireboy & Watergirl 4: In the Crystal Temple (2014)
5. Fireboy & Watergirl: Elements (2018)
6. Fireboy & Watergirl: Fairy Tales (2021)
7. Fireboy & Watergirl and Friends (2026)

== Reception ==
GamerBolt praised the pacing of the game by stating that the "too-easy" introductory levels did not take too long to complete before the game became more challenging. They stated that the game was "extremely well-executed" and there was a "decent number of levels" which meant the game potentially had several hours of gameplay. However, they stated that it did not necessarily have the complexity or the longevity to compete with other 2D platforming games such as Spelunky or Super Meat Boy.

Daria Paterek of Impact cited Fireboy and Watergirl as a game that made her "fall in love with gaming" and praised the games' replay value as each new installment has levels of varying difficulty and takes place in a distinct setting such as a forest, a desert and during winter. Nicole Clark of Polygon described the game as a "classic" and said that playing it "feels like traveling back in time". Clark stated that fans of Fireboy and Watergirl had found characters in Pixar's Elemental to be similar in design, though she said that elemental characters were not a novel idea citing Avatar: The Last Airbender and The Adventures of Sharkboy and Lavagirl as examples.
