= Niti Chaichitathorn =

Thai actor and host (born 1981)

- นิติ ชัยชิตาทร
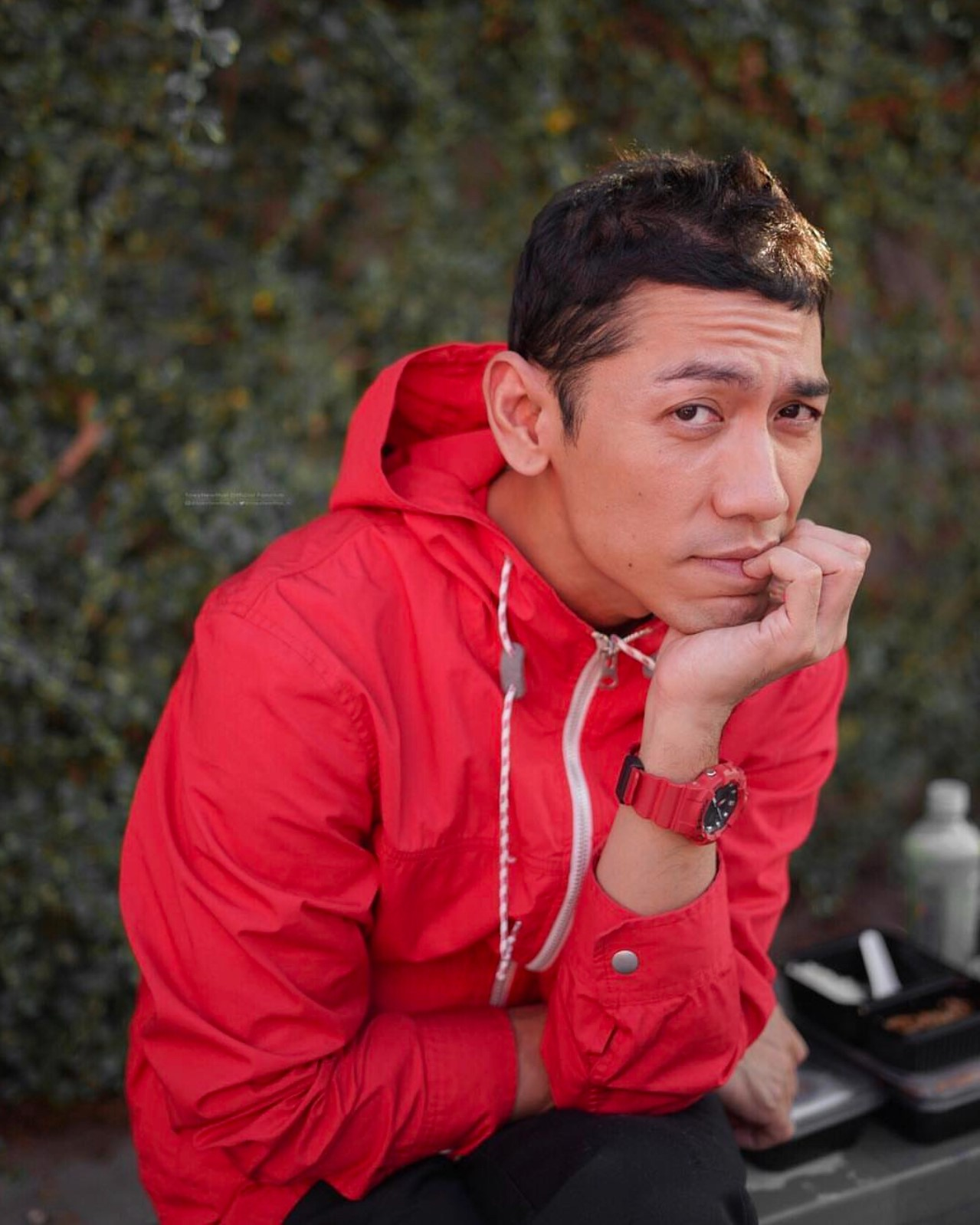
- Niti in 2019
- Born: Niti Chaichitathorn; October 7, 1981 (age 45); Bangkok, Thailand
- Education: Chulalongkorn University
- Occupations: TV host; actor
- Height: 175 cm (5 ft 9 in)

Niti Chaichitathorn (Thai: นิติ ชัยชิตาทร, born 7 October 1981), nicknamed Pompam, is a Thai television host, creative, producer and actor, best known for co-hosting the lifestyle travel show Toey Tiew Thai and hosting the late-night talk show Talk with Toey.

Niti graduated from Chulalongkorn University's Faculty of Arts, and joined GMMTV, becoming head of the creative group at its cable/satellite Bang Channel, through which Toey Tiew Thai was originally broadcast and became widely known. He is openly gay, and both Toey Tiew Thai and Talk with Toey heavily feature queer-related themes (the titles are a play on the word kathoey 'ladyboy'). He has also had various acting roles in films and television series. He won Best Entertainment Presenter/Host at the 22nd Asian Television Awards, for Talk with Toey, in 2017.

== Awards ==
Year	Nominated work	Category	Result
2016	Nine Entertain Awards 10th	Host of the Year	Nominated
2016	Nataraja Awards 8th	Best Talk Show	Nominated
2017	Asian Television Awards 22nd	Best Entertainment Presenter / Host	Won
2017	Golden Television Award 32nd	Outstanding Solo Presenter	Won
2018	GQ Men of the Year 2018	TV Personality	Won
2019	Nataraja Awards 10th	Best host	Nominated
