= Nawat Phumphotingam =

Thai actor (born 1995)

- ณวัชร์ พุ่มโพธิงาม
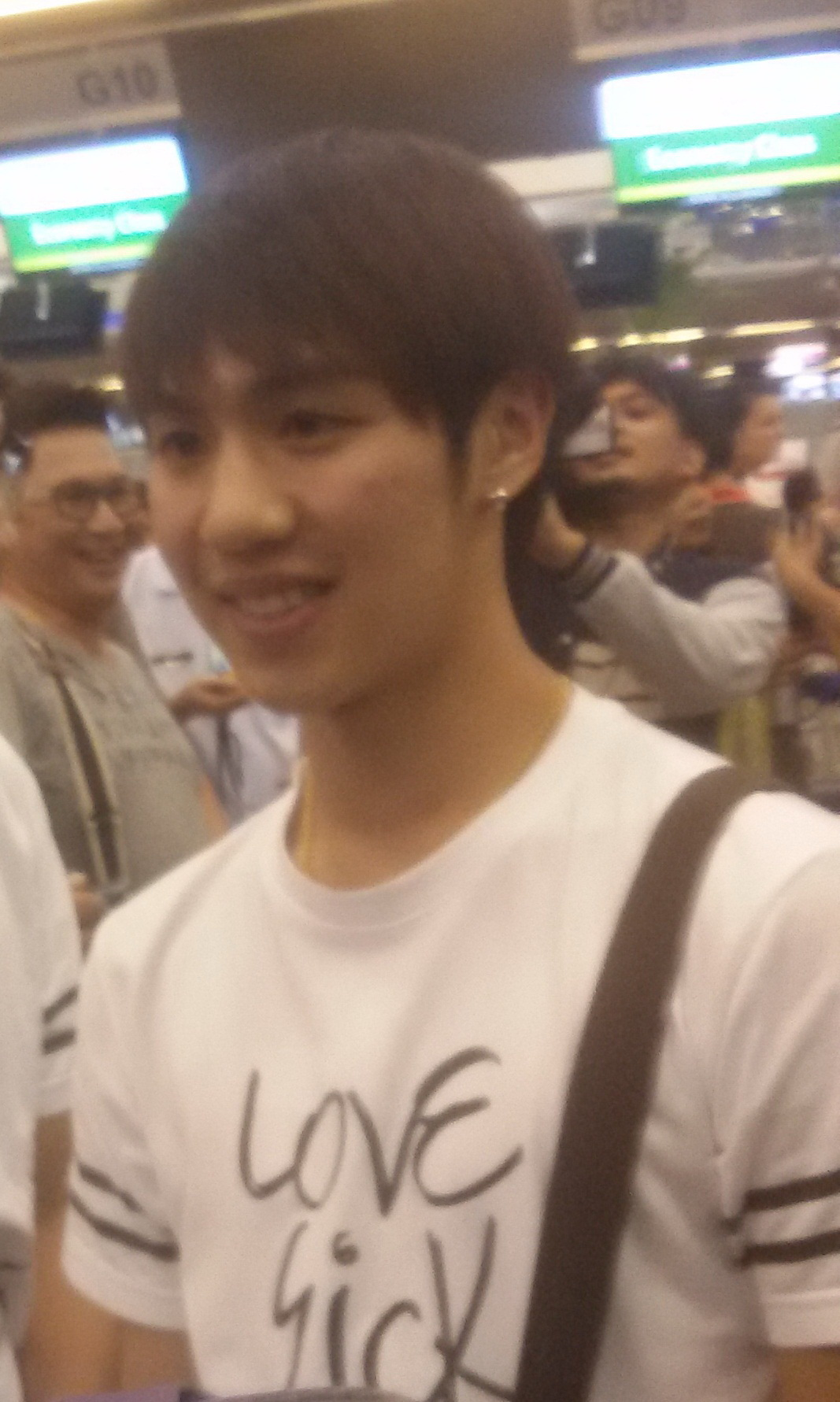
- Nawat at Suvarnabhumi Airport in 2014
- Born: 2 June 1995 (age 31); Bangkok, Thailand
- Other name: White
- Education: BBA (marketing) Bangkok University
- Occupation: Actor
- Years active: 2014–present
- Known for: Phun in Love Sick

Nawat Phumphotingam (Thai: ณวัชร์ พุ่มโพธิงาม; born 2 June 1995), nicknamed White (Thai: ไวท์), is a Thai actor. He is known for his starring role as Phun in MCOT's Love Sick (2014).

== Early life and education ==
Nawat was born in Bangkok, Thailand, and is an only child. He completed his secondary education at Bangkok's Assumption College and graduated with a bachelor's degree in business administration, major in marketing at Bangkok University.

== Career ==
Nawat auditioned for Love Sick in an open-call audition. He was called back to take on the role of Phun. He was initially worried about taking on the role of Phun because he did not want to cut his hair, as the directors initially wanted for his character and he was not interested in portraying a gay character as he was concerned on how people would perceive him for taking on the role. He later decided to join the cast and was happy because of the warm reception he received from fans of the show. The series ran for two seasons from 2014 to 2015, and garnered awards together with his lead co-star Chonlathorn Kongyingyong.

He took on the role of Pe, in the Senior Secret Love: My Lil Boy about a girl trying to charm a boy named S. He appeared in the two parts of the series. In the same year, Nawat joined the cast of War of High School: The Series, taking on the role of Rickey.

In 2017, Nawat was cast in the role of Kirun, in U-Prince. He was joined by his Love Sick: The Series co-star, Chonlathorn, who played his brother, Kiryu, in the series. He appeared in four of the twelve parts of the said series namely Playful Comm Arts, Extroverted Humanist, Single Lawyer and Ambitious Boss. In the same year, he appeared in Water Boyy, playing in the role of Fah.

He played Bo in the Thai romance drama, Mint to Be. In the same year, he also joined the cast of the comedy romance Beauty Boy: The Series.

He reprised his role as Phun from Love Sick: The Series in the three-part omnibus titled ReminderS. It was directed by New Siwaj Sawatmaneekul. The final episode was aired at the Millennial's Choice 2019 fan meeting. He then took on a supporting role in Theory of Love, playing the role of Two.

== Personal life ==
On 7 July 2019, he was ordained at the Wat Pariwat Ratchasongkhram.

== Filmography ==
- Love Sick Season 1 (2014)
- Wifi Society: Gray Secret (2015)
- Love Sick Season 2 (2015)
- Senior Secret Love: My Lil Boy (2016)
- War of High School: The Series (2016)
- Senior Secret Love: My Lil Boy 2 (2016)
- U-Prince: The Playful Comm Arts (2017)
- U-Prince: The Extroverted Humanist (2017)
- U-Prince: The Single Lawyer (2017)
- U-Prince: The Ambitious Boss (2017)
- Water Boyy (2017)
- Mint To Be (2018)
- Beauty Boy: The Series (2018)
- ReminderS (2019)
- Theory of Love (2019)
- Girl Next Room: Midnight Fantasy (2020)
- A Tale of Thousand Stars (2021)
- The Player (2021)
- Cupid's Last Wish (2022)
