= Water Boyy =

- Theatrical movie poster
- Directed by: Rachi Kusonkusiri
- Starring: Luangsodsai Anupart; Nappon Gomarachun; Beam Papangkorn
- Distributed by: Handmade Distributors
- Release date: October 22, 2015 (Thailand)
- Running time: 1 hour 53 minutes
- Country: Thailand
- Language: Thai

Water Boyy is a 2015 Thai LGBT drama film directed by Rachi Kusonkusiri and starring Ngern Luangsodsai Anupart and Beam Papangkorn. It was filmed primarily in Thailand.

In 2017, a television series adaptation Water Boyy with different actors aired. New characters were added including Pirapat Watthanasetsiri (Earth) as "Waii" and Thitipoom Techaapaikhun (New) as "Apo". It started airing on April 9, 2017.

== Plot ==
At Ocean High School in Hua Hin District, Nam (Luangsodsai Anupart) is a swimmer who does well despite a lack of training. He is popular on campus and has many girlfriends, inspiring envy among his peers, and also has a love of pornography which he needs to watch to sleep. However, his relationship with his father, swimming coach Neung (Nappon Gomarachun), is strained. Nine (Ausavaterakul Ausavapat), does Nam's homework and tutors him so Nam can teach him how to swim. Another swimmer, Muek (Beam Prapangkorn), becomes Nam's roommate. After Muek moves in, Nam is less interested in watching pornography. However, Muek has a girlfriend, Nune (Kitwiriya Natcharee), an actress, who shows up for the Super League Swimming Competition at Changmai. This turns out to be a competition for love. But during the process the two boys find themselves falling in love with each other.

== Cast ==
Character	Portrayed by	Remarks
Nam	Luangsodsai Anupart	Student of Ocean High School; Grade 12 student Swimmer; Likes Nune; Meuk's love interest and later boyfriend Addicted to pornography and later quit Nine's love interest Neung's son Talay's elder brother Disliked Karn; Likes watching soap opera Has phobia of taking planes Meuk's roommate in both Hua Hin and University; Friends with Champ, King, Moddam, Bo, Bee, Pleum, Yak and Nerd Moowan.
Meuk	Beam Papangkorn	Student of Ocean High School; Grade 12 student Swimmer; Nune's boyfriend and later ex-boyfriend Nam's love interest and later boyfriend Nine's love rival From Chiangmai, Thailand; Champion of the Super Youth Swimming League; Nam's roommate in both Hua Hin and University; Friends with Champ, King, Moddam, Bo, Bee, Pleum, Yak and Nerd Moowan.
Nune	Kitwiriya Natcharee	Rising actress Meuk's girlfriend and later ex-girlfriend Played as Jessica in the soap opera that Nam watches
Neung/Coach	Nappon Gomarachun	Swim coach of Ocean High School; Nam, Meuk, Champ, King, Moddam, Bo, Bee, Pleum, Yak and Nerd Moowan teacher Karn's lover and later ex lover Nam's and Talay's father
Nine	Ausavaterakul Ausavapat	Student of Ocean High School; Grade 10 student Achieved Silver in International Olympic Exam; Does not know how to swim, wanted Nam to coach him in exchange for his love and doing Nam's homework Likes Nam; Meuk's love rival
Karn	Most Witsarut	Neung's lover and later ex lover YouTube celebrity

== Soundtrack/OST ==
Here are the songs in this movie:

=== Track listing ===
No.	Title	Singer(s)	Length
1.	"Home Made" (Album: Age of Innocence)	Thomas Greenberg
2.	"Shake [สั่น]"	Sompob Pokepoon/Boy Sompob
3.	"Some Words [คำบางคำ]"	Sqweez Animal
4.	"My World Has Only You [โลกฉันมีแค่เธอ]"	Kongyingyong Chonlathorn/Captain Chonlathorn
5.	"Midnight Sun [พระอาทิตย์เที่ยงคืน]"	Sompob Pokepoon/Boy Sompob
6.	"Never Far Apart [ไม่เคยจะห่างกัน]"	Win Siriwong

== Production ==
The film represented a comeback for actor Nappon Gomarachun, who last worked in the film industry five years ago. He said that Director Rachi Kusonkusiri wanted to make the film, and it reflects how common disagreements between parents and children in Thailand were.

== Reception ==
The film was released on 22 October 2015. Madame Aung Tour, writer for Thai Rath, said that while the title Water Boyy created the impression that the film is about swimming, it is more about a father-son relationship and also a love story. She recommended the film for its atmosphere. Coconuts Bangkok stated that without the LGBT theme, the film would be a generic love story.
