= Little Big Dream =

2016 Thai television film

- Directed by: Chatkaew Susiwa
- Starring: Puttichai Kasetsin; Worranit Thawornwong
- Music by: A Dream Most Noble (ความฝันอันสูงสุด) by King Bhumibol Adulyadej
- Country of origin: Thailand
- Original language: Thai

Production
- Running time: 64 minutes

Original release
- Release: 5 December 2016

Little Big Dream (Thai: ความฝันอันสูงสุด), is a 2016 Thai television film starring Puttichai Kasetsin (Push) and Worranit Thawornwong (Mook). The film, directed by Chatkaew Susiwa and produced by GMMTV, premiered in Thailand and originally aired on One31 on 5 December 2016. It later premiered on GMM 25 on 1 October 2017, as several entertainment programs were temporarily stopped for the month of October in preparation for the royal cremation ceremonies of Thai King Bhumibol Adulyadej.

== Synopsis ==
The story, made in honor of King Bhumibol Adulyadej (Rama IX), highlights the values of love and respect of teenagers to their parents just as how they show their respect to the King as the father of the nation through his teachings.

== Cast and characters ==
Below are the cast of the series:

=== Main ===
- Puttichai Kasetsin (Push) as Phak
- Worranit Thawornwong (Mook) as Dream

=== Supporting ===
- Nachat Juntapun (Nicky) as Peng
- Korawit Boonsri (Gun) as Poppi
- Oranicha Krinchai (Proud) as May
- Korapat Kirdpan (Nanon) as Phum
- Tipnaree Weerawatnodom (Namtan) as Mo
- Kunchanuj Kengkarnka (Kan)

=== Guest ===
- Prachaya Ruangroj (Singto)
- Perawat Sangpotirat (Krist)
- Patchata Janngeon (Fiat)
- Korn Khunatipapisiri (Oaujun)
- Wachirawit Ruangwiwat (Chimon)
- Thitipoom Techaapaikhun (New)
- Atthaphan Phunsawat (Gun)
- Rutricha Phapakithi (Ciize)
- Ployshompoo Supasap (Jan)
- Thanaboon Wanlopsirinun (Na)
- Napasorn Weerayuttvilai (Puimek)
- Tawan Vihokratana (Tay)
- Harit Cheewagaroon (Sing)
- Thanat Lowkhunsombat (Lee)
- Alysaya Tsoi (Alice)
- Krittanai Arsalprakit (Nammon)
- Jirakit Kuariyakul (Toptap)
- Pirapat Watthanasetsiri (Earth)
- Jirakit Thawornwong (Mek)
- Jumpol Adulkittiporn (Off)
- Leo Saussay
- Sutthipha Kongnawdee (Noon)
- Nawat Phumphothingam (White)
- Chanagun Arpornsutinan (Gunsmile)
- Phurikulkrit Chusakdiskulwibul (Amp)
- Tytan Teepprasan
