= Happy Birthday (TV series) =

2018 Thai television series

- Official series poster
- Thai: Happy Birthday – วันเกิดของนาย วันตายของฉัน
- Genre: Romantic fantasy; Drama
- Created by: GMMTV
- Directed by: Kanittha Kwunyoo
- Starring: Puttichai Kasetsin; Lapassalan Jiravechsoontornkul; Purim Rattanaruangwattana
- Country of origin: Thailand
- Original language: Thai
- No. of episodes: 13

Production
- Running time: 60 minutes
- Production companies: GMMTV; Nar-ra-tor

Original release
- Network: GMM 25; LINE TV
- Release: 7 October – 30 December 2018

Happy Birthday (Thai: Happy Birthday – วันเกิดของนาย วันตายของฉัน; Happy Birthday – Wan Koet Khong Nai Wan Tai Khong Chan) is a 2018 Thai television series starring Puttichai Kasetsin (Push), Lapassalan Jiravechsoontornkul (Mild) and Purim Rattanaruangwattana (Pluem).

Directed by Kanittha Kwunyoo and produced by GMMTV together with Nar-ra-tor, the series was one of the ten television series for 2018 showcased by GMMTV in their "Series X" event on 1 February 2018. It premiered on GMM 25 and LINE TV on 7 October 2018, airing on Sundays at 20:30 ICT and 22:30 ICT, respectively. The series concluded on 30 December 2018.

== Cast and characters ==
=== Main ===
- Puttichai Kasetsin (Push) as Tee
- Lapassalan Jiravechsoontornkul (Mild) as Thannam
- Purim Rattanaruangwattana (Pluem) as Tonmai

=== Supporting ===
- Ployshompoo Supasap (Jan) as Noinha
- Thanaboon Wanlopsirinun (Na) as Phana
- Pronpiphat Pattanasettanon (Plustor) as a young Tee
- Wachirawit Ruangwiwat (Chimon) as a young Phana
- Santisuk Promsiri (Noom) as Chayt
- Sueangsuda Lawanprasert (Namfon) as Orn
- Sorapong Chatree as Uncle Tai
- Kalaya Lerdkasemsap (Ngek) as Wan
- Daraneenute Pasutanavin (Top) as Mae Pueng
- Korn Khunatipapisiri (Ouajun) as Top
- Alysaya Tsoi (Alice) as Jane
- Yuenyong Intira as Due
- Sukol Sasijulaka (Jome) as Prat
- Kittipat Chalaragse (Golf) as Lookgolf
- Achita Sikamana (Im) as Chymphy

=== Guest ===
- Nachat Juntapun (Nicky) as an interviewer (Ep. 2)
- Leo Saussay as an interviewer (Ep. 2)
- Prachaya Ruangroj (Singto) as himself (Ep. 3)
- Perawat Sangpotirat (Krist) as himself (Ep. 3)
- Watchara Sukchum (Jennie) as herself (Ep. 3)
- Jirakit Thawornwong (Mek) as Puen

== Soundtrack ==
Song title	Romanized title	Artist	Ref.
จำฉันได้หรือเปล่า	"Jum Chun Dai Reu Plow"	Sarunchana Apisamaimongkol (Aye)	
