= Worranit Thawornwong =

Thai actress and singer (born 1996)

- วรนิษฐ์ ถาวรวงศ์
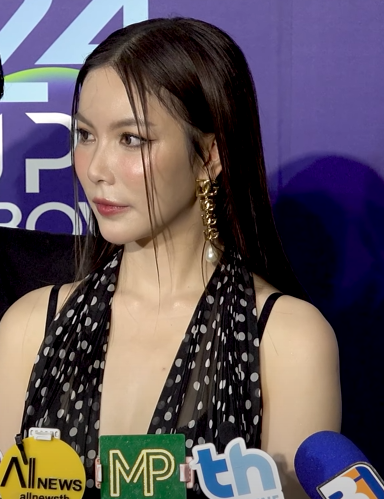
- Worranit in April 2024
- Born: 9 October 1996 (age 29); Bangkok, Thailand
- Other name: Mook
- Education: Kasetsart University (BA)
- Occupations: Actress; singer; MC; YouTuber
- Years active: 2014–present
- Agent: GMMTV (2014–2025)
- Known for: Junior in Ugly Duckling: Perfect Match; Noomnim in Oh My Boss; Kan in Peaceful Property
- Relatives: Jirakit Thawornwong (brother)

Worranit Thawornwong (วรนิษฐ์ ถาวรวงศ์; born 9 October 1996), nicknamed Mook (Thai: มุก), is a Thai actress and singer. She is best known for her roles in the Thai television series Ugly Duckling Series: Perfect Match (2015) and Oh My Boss (2021).

== Early life and education ==
Worranit was born on 9 October 1996 in Bangkok, Thailand. She is the second child in the family. Her brother, Jirakit Thawornwong, is also an actor. She attended high school at Satriwitthaya 2 School and graduated from the Faculty of Humanities at Kasetsart University.

== Career ==
Worranit started her acting career in 2014 through Channel Bang for the drama Rukjing Pinker as Bew. Later, she starred in another drama, Room Alone 401–410, as Snow. In 2015, she gained popularity through the drama Ugly Duckling: Perfect Match, where she was paired with Puttichai Kasetsin. She also sang the song for the said drama.

In 2016, she became part in another drama, Kiss The Series, where she was paired with Sattaphong Phiangphor. She was also paired with March Chutavuth Pattarakampol in another series, U-Prince where they took part in "Ambitious Boss". In 2017, she participated in another series, My Dear Loser, paired up together with Thanat Lowkhunsombat. Their part was entitled "Monster Romance". In 2018, she was paired with Perawat Sangpotirat in another series, Mint To Be. And she was paired with Yuke Songpaisan in another series, Love At First Hate. In 2019, she was paired with Krissada Pornweroj in Mia Noi series. She was paired with Oil Thana Suttikamol in another series, Plara Song Krueng.

In 2020, she participated in another series, Girl Next Room, paired up together with Pathompong Reonchaidee. Their part was entitled "Motorbike Baby". She was paired with Jirayu La-ongmanee in another series, Ban Sao Sod. Other than acting, she has also sung a few songs for the drama notably "Mah Tun Welah Por Dee" and "Kon Jao Choo" ("Bee Dup Bee Doo") for Ugly Duckling: Perfect Match and "Poot Wah Ruk Nai Jai" for Roon Pee Secret Love. She also starred in The Mask Singer Thailand. In 2025, she decided not to renew her contract with GMMTV.

== Filmography ==
=== Television series ===
Year	Title	Role	Notes	Channel	Ref.
2014	Rukjing Pinker	Bew		Bang Channel	
2014	Room Alone 401–410	Snow		One 31; Bang Channel	
2015	Ugly Duckling Series: Perfect Match	Junita/Junior/Joo		GMM 25; Bang Channel	
2015	Ugly Duckling Series: Pity Girl	Junita/Junior/Joo	Guest	GMM 25; Bang Channel	
2015	Ugly Duckling Series: Don't	Junita/Junior/Joo	Guest	GMM 25; Bang Channel	
2015	Room Alone 2	Snow		One31; Bang Channel	
2015	Ugly Duckling Series: Boy's Paradise	Junita/Junior/Joo	Guest	GMM 25; Bang Channel	
2016	Kiss: The Series	Sanrak		GMM 25	
2017	U-Prince	Mantou		GMM 25	
2017	My Dear Loser: Monster Romance	Namkhing		GMM 25	
2017	My Dear Loser: Happy Ever After	Namkhing	Guest	GMM 25	
2018	Kiss Me Again	Sanrak		GMM 25	
2018	Mint To Be	Bebe		GMM 25	
2018	Love at First Hate	Kluay		One31	
2019	Mia Noi	Chalathorn/Chala		GMM 25	
2019	Pla Ra Song Kruang	Awasda/Wan		GMM 25	
2020	Angel Beside Me	Serena		GMM 25	
2020	Girl Next Room: Motorbike Baby	Sundae		GMM 25	
2020	Girl Next Room: Security Love	Sundae	Guest	GMM 25	
2020	Ban Sao Sod	Taew		GMM 25	
2021	Oh My Boss	Noomnim		GMM 25	
2021	The Revenge	Kate/Prae		WeTV	
2022	My Queen	Baby		One31	
2022	The Three GentleBros	Kaewklao		GMM 25; Viu	
2023	Midnight Museum	Ratchanee	Guest	GMM 25; Viu	
2023	The Jungle	Gale		GMM 25; Viu	
2024	Club Friday Hot Love Issue	Thoe		One31	
2024	Peaceful Property	Kan		GMM 25; Viu	
2026	Shades	Nalin		FRT Entertainment	

=== Film ===
Year	Title	Role	Note	Network
2016	Little Big Dream	Dream		GMM One

== Discography ==
=== Singles ===
Year	Song title	English title	Television series
2015	"มาทันเวลาพอดี" (Mah Tun Welah Por Dee)	"You Came at Just the Right Time"	Ugly Duckling Series: Perfect Match
2015	"เธอ...คำถามซึ่งไร้คนตอบ"		Ugly Duckling Series: Perfect Match
2015	"คนเจ้าชู้ (บีดับบีดู)" (Kon Jao Choo (Bee Dup Bee Doo))	"Player"	Ugly Duckling Series: Boy's Paradise
2016	"พูดว่ารักในใจ" (Poot Wah Ruk Nai Jai)	"Saying I Love You In My Heart"	Senior Secret Love
2016	"ไม่ธรรมดา" (Mai Tummadah)	"Uncommon"	U-Prince: The Handsome Cowboy
2017	"หนี"		Senior Secret Love: Puppy Honey 2
2017	"อะไรก็ได้ในใจเธอ"		U-Prince: The Ambitious Boss
2017	คู่ชีวิต		My Dear Loser: Monster Romance
2018	"ยิ่งปฏิเสธ ยิ่งรักเธอ"		Mint To Be
2018	"จริงใจหรือแกล้งให้ไหวหวั่น"		Love at First Hate
2019	"เวลาใครถาม"	"Your Answer"	
2020	"รักตัวเองบ้างนะ"	"Love Yourself"	Girl Next Room
2020	"ไม่พอจะฝัน ร่วมกับ อิศรา กิจนิตย์ชีว์"		
2020	"หวังใจ (ไว้ให้เธอโสด)"		ฺBan Sao Sod
2021	"Tell Me"		Oh My Boss
2022	"สมัยนี้เค้าไม่แอบรัก"	"Just Say You Love Me"	Astrophile
2022	"แม่ไม่ชอบ แต่ฉันชอบ"	"Be Mine"	The Three GentleBros
2024	"I Missing You"		Find Yourself

== Accolades ==
Year	Award	Category	Result	Ref.
2018	12th Kazz Awards	Popular Female Teen Star	Won	
2018	The role model of Thai society	Person model of Thai society	Won	
2019	13th Kazz Awards	Most Popular Young Actress	Won	
2019	13th Kazz Awards	Young Girls of The Year	Won	
2019	HOWE Awards 2018	Shining Star for Female	Won	
2019	10th Smoke-Free Thai Society Artist Award	Rising Star for Female	Won	
2020	14th Kazz Awards	Cute Girl of The Year	Won	
