= Room Alone 2 =

2015–16 Thai television series

- Official series poster
- Thai: Room Alone 2 – รูมอะโลน
- Genre: Romance; Drama
- Created by: GMMTV
- Directed by: Nuttapong Mongkolsawas
- Country of origin: Thailand
- Original language: Thai
- No. of episodes: 15

Production
- Running time: 50 minutes
- Production company: GMMTV

Original release
- Network: One31; Bang Channel; LINE TV
- Release: 4 October 2015 – 24 January 2016

Related
- Room Alone 401–410

Room Alone 2 (Thai: Room Alone 2 – รูมอะโลน) is a 2015–2016 Thai television series which serves as a sequel to Room Alone 401–410.

Directed by Nuttapong Mongkolsawas and produced by GMMTV, the series was one of the two television series announced by GMMTV on 25 August 2015 along with Wonder Teacher. It premiered on One31, Bang Channel and LINE TV on 4 October 2015, airing on Sundays at 14:00 ICT, 15:00 ICT and 21:00 ICT, respectively. The series concluded on 24 January 2016.

== Cast and characters ==
Below are the cast of the series:

=== Main ===
- Anchasa Mongkhonsamai as Jaegun
- Achirawich Saliwattana (Gun) as Earng
- Maripha Siripool (Wawa) as Baitoey
- Phakjira Kanrattanasoot (Nanan) as Min
- Suwittayawat Pariyawit as Men
- Jirakit Kuariyakul (Toptap) as Tul
- Chatchawit Techarukpong (Victor) as Terk
- Jirakit Thawornwong (Mek) as View
- Worranit Thawornwong (Mook) as Snow
- Jumpol Adulkittiporn (Off) as Puen
- Thitipoom Techaapaikhun (New) as Ray
- Phurikulkrit Chusakdiskulwibul (Amp) as Gang
- Sattaphong Phiangphor (Tao) as Tent

=== Supporting ===
- Natthawat Chainarongsophon (Gun) as Camp
- Kornrawich Sungkibool (Junior) as Thanoo
- Tawan Vihokratana (Tay) as Warm
- Ramida Jiranorraphat (Jane) as Ploen
- Puwadon Vejvongsa as Kin
- Oranicha Krinchai (Proud) as Ampere
- Phanuphong Wongthom as Cable
- Sarunchana Apisamaimongkol (Aye) as Namhorm
- Sapol Assawamunkong (Great) as Key
- Leo Saussay
- Kanut Rojanai (Baan) as Home
- Tachakorn Boonlupyanun (Godji)
- Chanathip Phisutereewong (Bank) as Talay (Warm's friend)

=== Guest ===
- Patcha Poonpiriya (June) as Air (Ep. 12)
- Nattatida Damrongwisetphanit (Pear)
