= Wifi Society =

2015 Thai television series

- Official series poster
- Thai: Wifi Society – ไวไฟ โซไซตี้
- Genre: Romance; Drama; Anthology
- Created by: GMMTV
- Directed by: Nuttapong Mongkolsawas
- Country of origin: Thailand
- Original language: Thai
- No. of episodes: 30

Production
- Running time: 60 minutes
- Production company: GMMTV

Original release
- Network: One HD; GMM 25 (Rerun)
- Release: 1 March – 27 September 2015

Wifi Society (Thai: Wifi Society – ไวไฟ โซไซตี้; Wifi Society – Wai-fai So-sai-ti) is a 2015 Thai television anthology series directed by Nuttapong Mongkolsawas and produced by GMMTV.

Based on famous topics from Pantip.com, the series premiered on One HD and Bang Channel on 1 March 2015, airing on Sundays at 10:00 ICT and 20:00 ICT, respectively. The series concluded on 27 September 2015.

== Cast and characters ==
=== Hunt (BTS) ===
- Unnop Thongborisut (Por)
- Napasasi Surawan (Mind)

=== Hunt (Cinema) ===
- Anusorn Maneeted (Yong)
- Oranicha Krinchai (Proud)

=== Hunt (Game Shop) ===
- Nattharat Kornkaew (Champ)
- Jiraa Pitakpohntrakul (Guzjung)

=== Forget to Forget ===
- Aungoont Thanasapcharoen (Att)
- Sirimat Chuenwittaya
- Nutnicha Luanganunkun (Dream)

=== My Bed Friend ===
- Sheranut Yusananda (Namcha)
- Daweerit Chullasapya (Pae)

=== In Relationship ===
- Sirisilp Chotvijit
- Pakakanya Charoenyos (Bam)

=== Grey Secret ===
- Peeya Wantayon
- Nawat Phumphotingam (White)
- Korn Khunatipapisiri (Ouajun)

=== Truth Never Dies ===
- Nalinthip Phoemphattharasakun (Fon)
- Pitisak Yaowananon

=== Be My Dad ===
- Rueangrit Siriphanit (Ritz)
- Natthaphat Thiradechpithak
- Alysaya Tsoi (Alice)

=== Loser Lover ===
- Sumonthip Hsu (Gubgib)
- Suwikrom Amaranon (Per)

=== The Horror Home ===
- Pongphan Petchbuntoon (Louis)
- Thanakorn Chinakul (Beau)
- Jumpol Adulkittiporn (Off)

=== Be Another Me ===
- Danupan Yatuam
- Thanapan Yatuam
- Vatanya Bongkotkarn

=== Behind the Gold Medal ===
- Guntee Pitithan (CD)
- Withawin Wiraphong
- Chadatan Dankul

=== 15 Years Later ===
- Nachjaree Horvejkul (Cherreen)
- Chanon Santinatornkul (Non)
- Primrata Dejudom (Jaja)
- Akarin Akaranitimaytharatt

| class="col-break " |

=== Keep in Touch ===
- Wichayanee Pearklin (Gam)
- Sunny Burns

=== Secret Song ===
- Sarunchana Apisamaimongkol (Aye)
- Kittisak Patomburana (Jack)
- Khemmika Layluck

=== Secret in the Paper Plane ===
- Lapisara Intarasut (Apple)
- Pumipat Paiboon (Prame)
- Akeburud Sophon (Suice)

=== Little Light ===
- Krissanapoom Pibulsonggram (JJ)
- Poramaporn Jangkamol
- Phulita Supinchompoo (Namwhan)

=== Another Chance ===
- Arita Ramnarong (Chacha)
- Leo Saussay

=== Net Idol ===
- Sakuntala Thianphairot (Tornhom)
- Chatwalit Siritrap

=== Coming Home ===
- Thongpoom Siripipat (Big)
- Vasana Chalakorn

=== Empty Night ===
- Oranicha Krinchai (Proud)
- Pattarapol Kantapoj (Dew)

=== 32-34 ===
- Linotphita Chindaphu
- Purim Rattanaruangwattana (Pluem)

=== Oh My Wife ===
- Pimchanok Ponlabhun
- Chattarin Kulkalyadee

=== Just Only You ===
- Apinya Sakuljaroensuk (Saipan)
- Vonthongchai Intarawat (Tol)

=== Because of You ===
- Mintita Wattanakul (Mint)
- Nisachol Siwthaisong (Nest)

=== Close to You ===
- Nara Thepnupha
- Jakkarin Phooriphad
