= Sacred Promise =

- Genre: Romance; Drama; Historical; Lakorn
- Written by: Salaya Sukanivatt
- Starring: Yuke Songpaisan; Diana Flipo
- Country of origin: Thailand
- Original language: Thai
- No. of episodes: 12 episodes

Production
- Running time: 100 minutes
- Production company: Broadcast Thai Television

Original release
- Network: Channel 3
- Release: August 1 – September 11, 2019

Sacred Promise (Thai: สัตยาธิษฐาน; RTGS: Sattayathitthan) is a 2019 Thai television series that originally aired on Channel 3 from August 1 to September 11, 2019 for 12 episodes. The lakorn starring Yuke Songpaisan and Diana Flipo was adapted from a novel by Salaya Sukanivatt. The series, alternating between modern-day Bangkok and 19th-century Siam, tells the story of star-crossed lovers reunited in modern times by reincarnation. The historic part of the drama covers about 20 years during the reign and death of King Rama IV (Mongkut), and the reign of his son King Rama V (Chulalongkorn), who abolished slavery in Siam.

== Synopsis ==
Pakin (Yuke Songpaisan) is the son of a wealthy family. From early on, he is tormented by reoccurring nightmares of being executed by sword. After having been sent abroad to escape this nightmare, he returns from his studies to his family in Bangkok, only to find the nightmares resuming. While his parents reject them as bare dreams which he should just forget about, his grandmother supports him. Together, they consult a monk who concludes that Pakin appears to remember a past reincarnation. One day Pakin encounters Rosawan (Diana Flipo) who looks like a woman from this past. Moreover, when he accompanies his grandmother on a visit to an old wooden mansion she is interested in buying, Pakin recognises the building which leads to him experiencing vivid flash-backs from his past life. From then on his dreams turn into a consecutive retelling of the story of Tod (Yuke Songpaisan), his past alter ego . At the age of eight, Tod was sold by his impoverished mother to the wealthy Phra Wasu Pinit, the past owner of the old mansion. Tod grows up as a slave and servant to Phra Wasu Pinit’s son, Khun Nop, while falling in love with his master’s daughter and Khun Nop’s sister, Khun Nim (Diana Flipo).

Pakin watches Tods story unfolding in his dreams, keen to find out why he was executed in the past. Meanwhile, he attempts to get closer to Rosawan hoping that she is indeed the reincarnation of his past love Khun Nim. However, his overbearing ways of initiating contact with her irritate Rosawan and intensify her hatred of him she cannot explain herself. Pakin suspects it may be linked to his past life and his execution. So he has to follow Tods story through to find out, if Rosawan and he can overcome their differences from the past and be reunited in the present.

== Cast ==
=== Main ===
- Yuke Songpaisan as Pakin / Tod
- Diana Flipo as Rosawan / Khun Nim

=== Supporting ===
==== Recent and past times ====
- Lita Kaliya Niehuns as Naweeya / Noi
- Kiatkamol Lata as Thanwa / Chit
- Siraloet Ratchani as Pakinee, Pakin’s mother / Cheun, Tod’s mother

==== Recent time ====
- Sorawit Suboon as Sahat, Pakin’s friend
- Jeab Paweena Charivsakul as Chaba, Rosawan’s mother
- Narumol Nilawan as Rosawan’s aunt
- Wichai Jongprasitporn as Termsak

==== Past time ====
- Go Gosin Rachakrom as Khun Nop, Khun Nim’s brother
- Pu Moniere Jenuksorn as Phra Wasu Pinit, the father of Khun Nop and Khun Nim
- Narumon Phongsupan as Khun Nom, the mother of Khun Nop and Khun Nim
- Tao Sarocha Watitapun as Bai, Noi’s mother
- Donat Natchaya Mungnimit as Yam
- Noi Nuttanee Sittisamarn as Pit
- Watcharachai Soonthornsiri as Chod
- Suchao Pongwilai as Grandfather Som
- Thitima Sangkhaphithak as Sadet Phra Ong Ying
- Pisamai Wilaisak as Ubon
- Wayne Falconer as Tod’s father
