= Ugly Duckling (TV series) =

2015 Thai television series

- Official series poster
- Thai: Ugly Duckling – รักนะเป็ดโง่
- Genre: Romantic comedy
- Created by: GMMTV
- Directed by: Chatkaew Susiwa
- Starring: Worranit Thawornwong; Puttichai Kasetsin; Lapassalan Jiravechsoontornkul; Korapat Kirdpan; Tawan Vihokratana; Jirakit Thawornwong; Chatchawit Techarukpong; Natcha Janthapan; Esther Supreeleela; Korn Khunatipapisiri
- Country of origin: Thailand
- Original language: Thai
- No. of episodes: 30: 9 (Perfect Match); 5 (Pity Girl); 7 (Don't); 9 (Boy's Paradise)

Production
- Producer: Sataporn Panichraksapong
- Running time: 50 minutes
- Production companies: GMM Grammy; GMMTV

Original release
- Network: GMM 25
- Release: 17 May – 20 December 2015

Ugly Duckling (Thai: Ugly Duckling – รักนะเป็ดโง่; Ugly Duckling – Rak Na Pet Ngo) is a 2015 Thai television series each presented through one of the four segments entitled Perfect Match, Pity Girl, Don't and Boy's Paradise based on a series of novels published by Jamsai Publishing.

Directed by Chatkaew Susiwa and produced by GMMTV, the premiere segment Perfect Match was broadcast on 17 May 2015 to 12 July 2015, followed by Pity Girl (26 July 2015 to 23 August 2015), Don't (30 August 2015 to 11 October 2015) and Boy's Paradise (25 October 2015 to 20 December 2015), airing on Sundays on GMM 25 at 20:00 ICT.

The series was popular, and was Thailand's second-most searched for item in 2015, according to Google.

== Cast and characters ==
=== Main ===
==== Perfect Match ====
- Puttichai Kasetsin (Push) as Suea / Leo
- Worranit Thawornwong (Mook) as Junita / Junior

==== Pity Girl ====
- Natcha Janthapan (Mouse) as Aston
- Neen Suwanamas as Alice
- Nachat Juntapun (Nicky) as Fuyu

==== Don't ====
- Jirakit Thawornwong (Mek) as Zero
- Lapassalan Jiravechsoontornkul (Mild) as Maewnam
- Chatchawit Techarukpong (Victor) as Minton

==== Boy's Paradise ====
- Esther Supreeleela as Mami
- Sean Jindachot as CU
- Korn Khunatipapisiri (Oaujun) as Rayji
- Kitkasem Mcfadden (James) as LJ

=== Supporting ===
==== Perfect Match ====
- Korawit Boonsri (Gun) as Bee
- Akkaranat Ariyaritwikul (Nott) as Rio
- Nat Sakdatorn as a doctor
- Leo Saussay as Max
- Niti Chaichitathorn (Pompam) as a teacher
- Oranicha Krinchai (Proud) as Ning
- Petchbuntoon Pongphan (Louis) as Tot

==== Pity Girl ====
- Jumpol Adulkittiporn (Off) as Tom (Alice's ex-boyfriend)
- Thitipoom Techaapaikhun (New) as BM (Chica's boyfriend)
- Maripha Siripool (Wawa) as Patti
- Marie Eugenie Le Lay (Zom) as Chicha
- Tachakorn Boonlupyanun (Godji) as Martha

==== Don't ====
- Lapisara Intarasut (Apple) as Ozone
- Alysaya Tsoi (Alice) as Vivien
- Korapat Kirdpan (Nanon) as Plawan
- Gornpop Janjaroen (Joke) as Maewnam's father

==== Boy's Paradise ====
- Anchasa Mongkhonsamai as Namsom, Mami's friend
- Vichuda Pindum (Mam) as Mami's mother

=== Guest ===
==== Perfect Match ====
- Neen Suwanamas as Alice

==== Pity Girl ====
- Worranit Thawornwong (Mook) as Junita / Junior
- Chatchawit Techarukpong (Victor) as Minton
- Lapassalan Jiravechsoontornkul (Mild) as Maewnam

==== Don't ====
- Nachat Juntapun (Nicky) as Fuyu
- Tawan Vihokratana (Tay) as Ter
- Kittipat Chalaruk (Golf) as Doctor

==== Boy's Paradise ====
- Worranit Thawornwong (Mook) as Junita / Junior
- Neen Suwanamas as Alice
- Lapassalan Jiravechsoontornkul (Mild) as Maewnam
