= Oh My Boss =

2021 Thai television series

- Thai: นายคะอย่ามาอ่อย
- Genre: Romance
- Created by: GMMTV; FuKDuK Production
- Directed by: Sakon Wongsinwiset
- Starring: Worranit Thawornwong; Luke Ishikawa Plowden
- Country of origin: Thailand
- Original language: Thai
- No. of episodes: 14

Production
- Executive producer: Sataporn Panichraksapong
- Producer: FuKDuK Production
- Running time: 45 minutes
- Production companies: GMMTV; FuKDuK Production

Original release
- Network: GMM 25
- Release: May 19 – July 1, 2021

Oh My Boss (Thai: นายคะอย่ามาอ่อย; RTGS: Nai Kha Ya Ma Oi, lit. 'Mr. Don't Flirt... Oh My Boss!') is a 2021 Thai drama television series starring Worranit Thawornwong (Mook) and Luke Ishikawa Plowden.

Directed by Sakon Wongsinwiset and produced by GMMTV in joint partnership with FuKDuK Production, this series was one of 12 television series of GMMTV for 2020 during their "GMMTV 2020: New & Next" event on 15 October 2019.

== Synopsis ==
While Noomnim and her friends are celebrating her graduation at a bar, she falls in love with a dashing Japanese man. That man gives her a memorable kiss on a brief night, but their romance ends when she loses his business card.

A month later, Noomnim started working for Viper X and discovered that the man who had kissed her at that pub was the president of Viper X, Akitsuki Koji. However, meeting in these new circumstances made her feel distant. He has transformed into a cold, serious boss, unlike someone she has met before. She is so preoccupied with her new boss that she has to work harder to distract herself. However, a senior who is irritated that Noomnim does better work than her takes advantage of Noomnim's diligence and bullies her in a variety of ways.

There is a major problem that has affected her so significantly that her boss has had to come down and assist her in resolving it, even transferring her from the interpreter department to become his personal secretary. The closer they got, the more she learned that her boss had been waiting for her call the entire time and had never forgotten what happened at the pub that night. However, she had to deal with a variety of hard workloads, chattering colleagues, cunning customers with hidden desires, and Akitsuki's dark past, which had reappeared.

== Cast and characters ==
Below are the cast of the series:

=== Main ===
- Worranit Thawornwong (Mook) as Noomnim
- Luke Ishikawa Plowden as Akitsuki Koji (Company Executive Viper X)

=== Supporting ===
- Kullamas Limpawutivaranon (Knomjean) as Rena
- Ryota Omi as Hasobe (Company Employee Viper X)
- Patara Eksangkul (Foei) as Mark (Major part of the company Viper X)
- Thanaboon Wanlopsirinun (Na) as Minei (Company Employee Viper X)
- Phatchara Tubthong (Kapook) as Phin (Noomnim's friend)
- Sitang Punpop (Pai) as Ploy (Company Employee Viper X)
- Phakjira Kanrattanasoot (Nanan) as In (Company Employee Viper X)
- Chinnarat Siriphongchawalit (Mike) as Kamei (Company Employee Viper X)
- Suttatip Wutchaipradit (Ampere) as Gungging (Company Employee Viper X)
- Thawatchai Phechsuk (Urboy) as Poppy (Noomnim's friend)
- Darina Bunchu (Nancy) as Meow (Noomnim's friend)
- Worachai Hiranlab (Top) as Tan (Company Employee Viper X)
- Pranee Meechamnan (Nanan) as Ja Eo’ (Company Employee Viper X)
- Haruka Yamashita (Harupiii) as Miyakawa Arsuuki (Japanese Model)
- Natpicha Phisadpongchana (Jee) as Ley Kha Mark
- Kradsada Khienjarien (Jao Champ) as Thing (Company Employee Viper X)
- Kazuki Yano as Hasobe’ (President of Kirei (Japan))
- Suumiji Condo as (Hasobe-san's Followers 1)
- Napharit Thaimanee as (Hasobe-san's Followers 2)

=== Guest role ===
- Thitiya Nobpongsakid (Giff) as (Noomnim Mother) (Ep. 4, 8, 9, 10, 11, 12)
- Jirakit Thawornwong (Mek) as Nat (Noomnim Brother) (Ep. 9, 11, 12)
- Yanavee Guptavetin (Oil) as (Company Employee Viper X) (Ep. 2)
- Ratprapha Wisuma (Meji) as Baifern (Thai female models) (Ep. 5)
- Lewit Sangsit (Aon) as (Company Employee Viper X Old Customer) (Ep. 8)
- Pattarawan Nanchanok (Mouy) as Kun Su (Department Store Manager) (Ep. 10)

== Reception ==
The red number indicates highest number The blue number indicates lowest number
EP NO	AIRING DATE	AVERAGE AUDIENCE SHARE
1	Wednesday & Thursday 20:30	0.287%
2	Wednesday & Thursday 20:30	0.305%
3	Wednesday & Thursday 20:30	0.600%
4	Wednesday & Thursday 20:30	0.405%
5	Wednesday & Thursday 20:30	0.502%
6	Wednesday & Thursday 20:30	0.438%
7	Wednesday & Thursday 20:30	0.458%
8	Wednesday & Thursday 20:30	0.450%
9	Wednesday & Thursday 20:30	0.448%
10	Wednesday & Thursday 20:30	0.512%
11	Wednesday & Thursday 20:30	0.557%
12	Wednesday & Thursday 20:30	0.525%
13	Wednesday & Thursday 20:30	0.537%
14	Wednesday & Thursday 20:30	0.587%
Average		0.471%

== International broadcasting ==
In the Philippines, the series was broadcast on GMA Network from Monday to Friday at 11:30 PM from April 21 to May 30, 2025, and A.D. The Bible Continues replaced it on June 2, 2025.
