= Girl Next Room =

2020 Thai television series

- Official series poster
- Thai: Girl Next Room – หอนี้ชะนีแจ่ม
- Genre: Romantic comedy
- Created by: GMMTV
- Based on: Security Love ยามหล่อบอกต่อว่ารัก; Richy Rich! รวยมากนะ! รู้ยังคะทุกคน; Motorbike Baby วินสุดหล่อขอส่งเธอให้ถึงหัวใจ; Midnight Fantasy สถานีขี้เซาของเราสองคน
- Directed by: Saroch Nuamsamram (Motorbike Baby & Midnight Fantasy); Sakol Wongsinwiset & Thipaphon Puangmaha (Richy Rich); Anucha Boonyawattana (Security Love)
- Starring: Worranit Thawornwong; Pathompong Reonchaidee; Juthapich Indrajundra; Prachaya Ruangroj; Lapassalan Jiravechsoontornkul; Jumpol Adulkittiporn; Sarocha Burintr; Jirayu La-ongmanee
- Ending theme: "รักตัวเองบ้างนะ" (Ruk Tua Ang Bang Na) by Mook Worranit
- Composer: Superouu
- Country of origin: Thailand
- Original language: Thai
- No. of episodes: 21: 6 (Motorbike Baby); 4 (Midnight Fantasy); 5 (Richy Rich); 6 (Security Love)

Production
- Running time: 50 minutes
- Production companies: GMMTV; Gmo Films

Original release
- Network: GMM 25; LINE TV
- Release: 1 March – 26 July 2020

Girl Next Room (Thai: Girl Next Room – หอนี้ชะนีแจ่ม; Girl Next Room – Ho Ni Chani Chaem) is a 2020 Thai television series starring Worranit Thawornwong (Mook), Pathompong Reonchaidee (Toy), Juthapich Indrajundra (Jamie), Prachaya Ruangroj (Singto), Lapassalan Jiravechsoontornkul (Mild), Jumpol Adulkittiporn (Off), Sarocha Burintr (Gigie) and Jirayu La-ongmanee (Kao). Produced by GMMTV together with Gmo Films, it is a four-part series that follows the love lives of four occupants in an all-women boarding house, each presented through one of the four segments entitled Motorbike Baby, (Note: Thai: วินนี้ดีต่อใจ, RTGS: Win ni di to chai) Midnight Fantasy, (Note: Thai: สถานีขี้เซา, RTGS: Sathani khisao) Richy Rich (Note: Thai: รวยนะคะรู้ยัง, RTGS: Ruai na kha ru yang) and Security Love. (Note: Thai: ยามหล่อบอกต่อว่ารัก, RTGS: Yam lo bok towa rak)

The series was one of the twelve television series for 2020 showcased by GMMTV in their "New & Next" event on 15 October 2019. It aired on Sundays on GMM 25 and LINE TV at 20:30 ICT and 22:30 ICT, respectively. The premiere segment Motorbike Baby was broadcast on 1 March 2020 to 5 April 2020, followed by Midnight Fantasy (19 April 2020 to 10 May 2020) and Richy Rich (17 May 2020 to 14 June 2020). The last segment, Security Love, premiered on 21 June 2020 and concluded on 26 July 2020.

== Synopsis ==
=== Motorbike Baby ===
Sundae (Worranit Thawornwong) lives in Jamjan Boarding House owned by Mrs. Jam (Daraneenute Pasutanavin) and her son Sky (Trai Nimtawat). One strict rule is that no boys are allowed in the boarding house. However, Sundae is torn between her ex-boyfriend, Tankhun (Pathompong Reonchaidee) and a new potential love — who will she choose?

=== Midnight Fantasy ===
First year college student Mimi (Juthapich Indrajundra) is a scaredy-cat who is used to being with her parents. As she starts living in Jamjam Boarding House away from her parents, her fears are heightened and aggravated by ghost stories surrounding the dorm. Because of this, she cannot sleep well at night which leads her to encounter DJ Titan (Prachaya Ruangroj), who hosts Middle Radio's program Midnight Fantasy from three to five in the early morning. Mimi is his sole, avid listener, who feels secure whenever she listens to him.

But listening to the program late at night and into the early hours causes Mimi to be too drowsy by morning. One day, she gets caught sleeping in her class and the angry professor instructs her and a fellow sleepyhead classmate Tan (Prachaya Ruangroj) to make a report together. As the two students work on their report, Mimi notices similarities between DJ Titan and Tan. Soon, she has to choose between the warm and kind DJ Titan and her mean and rude report partner Tan.

=== Richy Rich ===
Danglek Saeyang (Lapassalan Jiravechsoontornkul) transformed herself from a poor girl to a rich, high-ranking lady in the name of Darin Apimaha-ngoenthong, a.k.a. "Duchess." She likes to show off because in the past, she was poor. By chance, she meets Krathing (Jumpol Adulkittiporn), to whom she had let slip her sad past. Krathing keeps on teasing Duchess, who risks her past being revealed to everyone.

=== Security Love ===
View Viva (Sarocha Burintr), a famous rising star model, decides to live in Jamjan Boarding House where she meets Fai (Jirayu La-ongmanee), a security guard in the said edifice. As she continues to reap success from her career, she slowly falls in love with Fai who gets to help and protect her. However, her public image and the fear that the media may find out that she's dating a security guards is holding back their relationship.

== Cast and characters ==
=== Main ===
==== Motorbike Baby ====
- Worranit Thawornwong (Mook) as Sundae
- Pathompong Reonchaidee (Toy) as Tankhun

==== Midnight Fantasy ====
- Juthapich Indrajundra (Jamie) as Mimi (Note: Also appears in Motorbike Baby and Richy Rich)
- Prachaya Ruangroj (Singto) as Thaitan "Tan" Thitipakorn, a.k.a. DJ Titan

==== Richy Rich ====
- Lapassalan Jiravechsoontornkul (Mild) as Danglek Saeyang / Darin "Duchess" Apimaha-ngoenthong (Note: Also appears in Motorbike Baby and Midnight Fantasy)
- Jumpol Adulkittiporn (Off) as Krathing Karnpiphob

==== Security Love ====
- Sarocha Burintr (Gigie) as View Wiwa (Note: Also appears in all previous segments)
- Jirayu La-ongmanee (Kao) as Faigun "Fai" Phuangmaha

=== Supporting ===
==== Appearing in all segments ====
- Daraneenute Pasutanavin (Top) as Mrs. Jam, the owner of Jamjan Boarding House
- Trai Nimtawat (Neo) as Sky, Mrs. Jam's son

==== Motorbike Baby ====
- Gawin Caskey (Fluke) as Mile
- Napat Patcharachavalit (Aun) as Tanthai, Tankhun's brother
- Sivakorn Lertchuchot (Guy) as Sunny, Sundae's brother
- Phurikulkrit Chusakdiskulwibul (Amp) as Thai
- Sutina Laoamnuaichai (Guide) as Sundae's friend

==== Midnight Fantasy ====
- Krittanai Arsalprakit (Nammon) as James, Tan's friend
- Chanagun Arpornsutinan (Gunsmile) as Peemai
- Nawat Phumphotingam (White) as Daosao, Tan and Peemai's friend

==== Richy Rich ====
- Jirakit Thawornwong (Mek) as Khunkhao Yothathap
- Lapisara Intarasut (Apple) as Benjamaporn "Honey" Meeprempi
- Wanwimol Jensawamethee (June) as Fahsai
- Sutthipha Kongnawdee (Noon) as Kratae Karnpiphob

==== Security Love ====
- Chavalit Chittanant (Chao) as Phanphu

== Soundtrack ==
Song title	Romanized title	Artist	Ref.
รักตัวเองบ้างนะ	Ruk Tua Ang Bang Na	Worranit Thawornwong (Mook)	

== Reception ==
=== Thailand television ratings ===
- In the table below, the blue number represents the lowest ratings and the red number represents the highest ratings.
- N/A denotes that the rating is not known.

==== Motorbike Baby ====
Episode No.	Timeslot (UTC+07:00)	Air date	Average audience share	Ref.
1	Sunday 8:30 pm	1 March 2020	0.262%	
2	Sunday 8:30 pm	8 March 2020	0.186%	
3	Sunday 8:30 pm	15 March 2020	0.087%	
4	Sunday 8:30 pm	22 March 2020	0.184%	
5	Sunday 8:30 pm	29 March 2020	0.183%	
6	Sunday 8:30 pm	5 April 2020	0.239%	
Average			0.190% ^{1}	

==== Midnight Fantasy ====
Episode No.	Timeslot (UTC+07:00)	Air date	Average audience share	Ref.
1	Sunday 8:30 pm	19 April 2020	0.306%	
2	Sunday 8:30 pm	26 April 2020	0.310%	
3	Sunday 8:30 pm	3 May 2020	0.241%	
4	Sunday 8:30 pm	10 May 2020	0.294%	
Average			0.288% ^{1}	

==== Richy Rich ====
Episode No.	Timeslot (UTC+07:00)	Air date	Average audience share	Ref.
1	Sunday 8:30 pm	17 May 2020	0.489%	
2	Sunday 8:30 pm	24 May 2020	0.339%	
3	Sunday 8:30 pm	31 May 2020	0.338%	
4	Sunday 8:30 pm	7 June 2020	0.321%	
5	Sunday 8:30 pm	14 June 2020	0.346%	
Average	Sunday 8:30 pm		0.367% ^{1}	

==== Security Love ====
Episode No.	Timeslot (UTC+07:00)	Air date	Average audience share	Ref.
1	Sunday 8:30 pm	21 June 2020	0.540%	
2	Sunday 8:30 pm	28 June 2020	0.501%	
3	Sunday 8:30 pm	5 July 2020	—N/a	—N/a
4	Sunday 8:30 pm	12 July 2020	—N/a	—N/a
5	Sunday 8:30 pm	19 July 2020	—N/a	—N/a
6	Sunday 8:30 pm	26 July 2020	—N/a	—N/a
Average			— ^{2}	

^1 Based on the average audience share per episode.
^2 Due to some ratings not recorded, the exact average rating is unknown.
