= Dark Blue Kiss =

2019 Thai television series

- Official series poster
- Dark Blue Kiss – จูบสุดท้ายเพื่อนายคนเดียว
- Genre: Romantic comedy; Drama
- Created by: GMMTV
- Based on: Dark Blue Kiss รักไม่ระบุสถานะ by Hideko Sunshine
- Directed by: Noppharnach Chaiwimol
- Starring: Tawan Vihokratana; Thitipoom Techaapaikhun; Suphakorn Sriphothong; Gawin Caskey; Chayapol Jutamas
- Ending theme: "ไม่มีนิยาม" (Mai Mee Ni Yam) by Tay Tawan and New Thitipoom
- Country of origin: Thailand
- Original language: Thai
- No. of episodes: 12

Production
- Running time: 50 minutes
- Production companies: GMM Grammy; GMMTV

Original release
- Network: GMM 25; LINE TV
- Release: 12 October – 28 December 2019

Related
- Kiss: The Series; Kiss Me Again; Our Skyy

Dark Blue Kiss (Thai: Dark Blue Kiss – จูบสุดท้ายเพื่อนายคนเดียว; Dark Blue Kiss – Chup Sut Thai Phuea Nai Khon Diao; lit. Dark Blue Kiss - The Last Kiss Is For You Only) is a 2019 Thai television series starring Tawan Vihokratana (Tay), Thitipoom Techaapaikhun (New), Suphakorn Sriphothong (Pod), Gawin Caskey (Fluke) and Chayapol Jutamas (AJ). Directed by Aof Noppharnach and produced by GMMTV, the series was one of the thirteen television series for 2019 launched by GMMTV in their "Wonder Th13teen" event on 5 November 2018. It premiered on GMM 25 and LINE TV on 12 October 2019, airing on Saturdays at 21:25 ICT and 23:00 ICT, respectively. The series concluded on 28 December 2019.

== Synopsis ==
Taking off from the Kiss Me Again series, Pete (Tawan Vihokratana) and Kao (Thitipoom Techaapaikhun), who is still closeted from his mother, have grown closer to each other in their relationship. As his sister goes to college, Kao contributes to his family's finances by taking on part-time tutoring for high school students. The director of the school where his mom works asks Kao to tutor his son, Non (Chayapol Jutamas), after hearing that he is a good tutor. Pete crosses paths with Non in a competition and pisses him off after learning that Kao is tutoring him. With Non fueling Pete's jealousy, his relationship with Kao gets tested in several occasions.

Sun (Suphakorn Sriphotong), who was pursuing Kao before, has been nagging Mork (Gawin Caskey) for dragging his younger brother, Rain (Pluem Pongpisal), into his troubles. To help Mork change his life, Sun offers Mork a job in his café. Along the way, the two of them start to care for each other. However, with Mork's dangerous life still troubling him, Sun makes it clear that he is there because he cares for him.

== Cast and characters ==
=== Main ===
- Tawan Vihokratana (Tay) as Phubodin Rachatraku (Pete)
- Thitipoom Techaapaikhun (New) as Phanuwat Chotiwat (Kao)
- Suphakorn Sriphotong (Pod) as Sun
- Gawin Caskey (Fluke) as Mork
- Chayapol Jutamas (AJ) as Non

=== Supporting ===
- Pluem Pongpisal as Rain
- Lapassalan Jiravechsoontornkul (Mild) as Sandee
- Jirakit Thawornwong (Mek) as Thada
- Nachat Juntapun (Nicky) as June
- Patchatorn Thanawat (Ploy) as Manow
- Lapisara Intarasut (Apple) as Kitty
- Krittaphat Chanthanaphot as Pete's father
- Benja Singkharawat (Yangyi) as Kao's mother
- Paramej Noiam as Non's father

=== Guest ===
- Thanaboon Wanlopsirinun (Na) as barista
- Phuwin Tangsakyuen
- Trai Nimtawat (Neo)

== Soundtrack ==
Song title	Romanized title	Artist(s)	Ref.
ไม่มีนิยาม	"Mai Mee Ni Yam"	Tawan Vihokratana (Tay); Thitipoom Techaapaikhun (New)	
ต่อให้เป็นจูบสุดท้าย	"Dtor Hai Bpen Joop Soot Tai"	Gawin Caskey (Fluke)	

== Reception ==
On 24 December 2019, GMMTV announced a fan meeting event dubbed as "POLCA The Journey: Tay & New 1st Fan Meeting in Thailand" scheduled for 21 March 2020 at Chaengwattana Hall, CentralPlaza Chaengwattana featuring the series' main casts. However, due to COVID-19 pandemic concerns, the said event was postponed and was rescheduled twice to 1 August 2020 and later to 28 November 2020. A month prior to the new date of the fan meeting event, GMMTV announced on 21 October 2020 that it will now be scheduled for 20 February 2021 and will be made available to fans outside of Thailand via V Live on the same date. The venue has also been moved to the Union Hall of Union Mall.

=== Viewership ===
In the table below, the blue number represents the lowest rating and the red numbers represent the highest ratings.

Episode No.	Timeslot (UTC+07:00)	Air date	Average audience share	Ref.
1	Saturday 9:25 pm	12 October 2019	0.228%	
2	Saturday 9:25 pm	19 October 2019	0.3%	
3	Saturday 9:25 pm	26 October 2019	0.202%	
4	Saturday 9:25 pm	2 November 2019	0.251%	
5	Saturday 9:25 pm	9 November 2019	0.124%	
6	Saturday 9:25 pm	16 November 2019	0.241%	
7	Saturday 9:25 pm	23 November 2019	0.137%	
8	Saturday 9:25 pm	30 November 2019	0.2%	
9	Saturday 9:25 pm	7 December 2019	0.213%	
10	Saturday 9:25 pm	14 December 2019	0.179%	
11	Saturday 9:25 pm	21 December 2019	0.307%	
12	Saturday 9:25 pm	28 December 2019	0.201%	

^1 Based on the average audience share per episode.

=== Awards and nominations ===
Award	Year	Category	Recipient(s) and nominee(s)	Result	Ref.
LINE TV Awards	2019	Best Couple	Tawan Vihokratana and Thitipoom Techaapaikhun	Nominated	
Maya Awards	2020	Favorite TV Series of the Year	Dark Blue Kiss	Nominated	
Maya Awards	2020	Best Official Soundtrack	"ไม่มีนิยาม" (Mai Mee Ni Yam) by Tawan Vihokratana and Thitipoom Techaapaikhun	Won	

== International broadcast ==
- Japan – The series will premiere on 12 October 2020 at 23:00 JST on SKY PerfecTV!. Succeeding episodes will be released every Mondays thereafter. For J:COM, only the first episode will be aired for free.
- Philippines – The series was among the five GMMTV television series acquired by ABS-CBN Corporation, as announced by Dreamscape Entertainment on 10 September 2020. All episodes were made available for streaming via iWantTFC on 26 October 2020.
