= Pluem Pongpisal =

Thai actor (born 1997)

- ปลื้ม พงษ์พิศาล
- Born: 19 July 1997 (age 29); Bangkok, Thailand
- Education: Chulalongkorn University; Faculty of Architecture
- Occupation: Actor
- Years active: 2016–present
- Agent: GMMTV (2016-2025)
- Known for: Kevin in U-Prince; Rain in Dark Blue Kiss; Phuak in 2gether: The Series

Pluem Pongpisal (Thai: ปลื้ม พงษ์พิศาล; born 19 July 1997) is a Thai actor. He is known for his supporting roles on television including GMMTV's U-Prince (2016), Dark Blue Kiss (2019), and 2gether: The Series (2020).

== Early life and education ==
Pluem was born in Bangkok, Thailand. He completed his secondary education at the Wat Pra Sri Mahadhat Secondary Demonstration School of the Phranakhon Rajabhat University where he had the opportunity to become an international exchange student in the United States through the AFS intercultural program. He graduated from the Faculty of Architecture of the Chulalongkorn University.

In his first year as an architecture student, he became part of Chulalongkorn University's Generation 8 that represented the school in the 71st Chula–Thammasat Traditional Football Match.

== Filmography ==
=== Television ===
Year	Title	Role	Notes	Ref.
2016	U-Prince:The Foxy Pilot	Kevin		
2017	U-Prince:The Playful Comm-Arts	Kevin		
2017	U-Prince: Extroverted Humanist	Kevin		
2018	Kiss Me Again	Rain		
2019	Dark Blue Kiss	Rain		
2020	2gether: The Series	Phuak		

== Awards and nominations ==
Year	Awards Ceremony	Award	Category	Ref.
2017	6th "Hundred Hearts for the Father of the Kingdom and Following His Majesty's Footsteps"; Awards Ceremony in Honor of His Majesty the King Rama IX	Golden Lotus/Buathong "Role Model of the Year"	Youth Role Model	
