= Kiss Me Again (TV series) =

2018 Thai television series

- Official series poster
- Thai: Kiss Me Again – จูบให้ได้ถ้านายแน่จริง
- Genre: Romantic comedy; Drama
- Created by: GMMTV
- Directed by: Weerachit Thongjila
- Starring: Sananthachat Thanapatpisal; Chutavuth Pattarakampol; Kanyawee Songmuang; Tanutchai Wijitvongtong; Thitipoom Techaapaikhun; Tawan Vihokratana; Jintanutda Lummakanon; Pirapat Watthanasetsiri
- Country of origin: Thailand
- Original language: Thai
- No. of episodes: 14

Production
- Running time: 60 minutes
- Production company: GMMTV

Original release
- Network: GMM 25; LINE TV
- Release: 22 April – 22 July 2018

Related
- Kiss: The Series; Dark Blue Kiss; Our Skyy

Kiss Me Again (Thai: Kiss Me Again – จูบให้ได้ถ้านายแน่จริง; Kiss Me Again: Chup Hai Dai Tha Nai Nae Ching) is a 2018 Thai television series starring Sananthachat Thanapatpisal (Fon), Chutavuth Pattarakampol (March), Kanyawee Songmuang (Thanaerng), Tanutchai Wijitvongtong (Mond), Thitipoom Techaapaikhun (New), Tawan Vihokratana (Tay), Jintanutda Lummakanon (Pango) and Pirapat Watthanasetsiri (Earth).

Directed by Weerachit Thongjila and produced by GMMTV together with Housestories 8, the series was one of the ten television series for 2018 showcased by GMMTV in their "Series X" event on 1 February 2018. It premiered on GMM 25 and LINE TV on 22 April 2018, airing on Sundays at 20:30 ICT and 22:30 ICT, respectively. The series concluded on 22 July 2018.

== Cast and characters ==
=== Main ===
- Sananthachat Thanapatpisal (Fon) as Sanwan
- Chutavuth Pattarakampol (March) as R
- Kanyawee Songmuang (Thanaerng) as Sanson
- Tanutchai Wijitvongtong (Mond) as Matt
- Thitipoom Techaapaikhun (New) as Phanuwat Chotiwat (Kao)
- Tawan Vihokratana (Tay) as Phubodin Rachatraku (Pete)
- Jintanutda Lummakanon (Pango) as Sansuay
- Pirapat Watthanasetsiri (Earth) as So

=== Supporting ===
- Lapassalan Jiravechsoontornkul (Mild) as Sandee
- Jirakit Thawornwong (Mek) as Thada
- Worranit Thawornwong (Mook) as Sanrak
- Thanaboon Wanlopsirinun (Na) as Win
- Sattaphong Phiangphor (Tao) as Na
- Phurikulkrit Chusakdiskulwibul (Amp) as Pat
- Chanagun Arpornsutinan (Gunsmile) as Wayu
- Nachat Juntapun (Nicky) as June
- Noelle Klinneam (Tiny) as Khun Jane
- Alysaya Tsoi (Alice) as Sinee
- Krittanai Arsalprakit (Nammon) as Prize
- Juthapich Indrajundra (Jamie) as Mint
- Pop Khamgasem as Chacha
- Thitichaya Chiwpreecha (Chat) as Sanwan's friend
- Kaimook Apasiri as Angie
- Pluem Pongpisal as Rain
- Suphakorn Sriphotong (Pod) as Sun
- Gawin Caskey (Fluke) as Mork
- Saitharn Niyomkarn as a mother
- Phatchara Tubthong (Kapook) as Nicole
- Krittaphat Chanthanaphot as Pete's father
- Benja Singkharawat (Yangyi) as Kao's mother

=== Guest ===
- Achirawich Saliwattana (Gun) as Rit
- Natticha Chantaravareelekha (Fond) as Gift

== Soundtrack ==
Song title	Romanized title	Artist	Ref.
"ให้มันน่าKissหน่อย"	"Hai Mun Na Kiss Noi"	Sarunchana Apisamaimongkol	
