= Room Alone 401–410 =

2014 Thai television series

- Official series poster
- Thai: Room Alone 401–410 – รูมอะโลน
- Genre: Romance; Drama
- Created by: GMMTV
- Directed by: Nuttapong Mongkolsawas
- Country of origin: Thailand
- Original language: Thai
- No. of episodes: 10

Production
- Running time: 50 minutes
- Production company: GMMTV

Original release
- Network: One HD; Bang Channel; GMM 25 (Rerun)
- Release: 25 October – 27 December 2014

Related
- Room Alone 2

Room Alone 401–410 (Thai: Room Alone 401–410 – รูมอะโลน; Room Alone 401–410 – Rum A-lon) is a 2014 Thai television series directed by Nuttapong Mongkolsawas and produced by GMMTV.

The series premiered on One HD and Bang Channel on 25 October 2014, airing on Saturdays at 13:00 ICT and on Sundays at 20:00 ICT, respectively. The series concluded on 27 December 2014.

Its sequel, Room Alone 2, premiered on 4 October 2015.

== Cast and characters ==
=== Main ===
- Anchasa Mongkhonsamai as Jaegun
- Achirawich Saliwattana (Gun) as Earng
- Maripha Siripool (Wawa) as Baitoey
- Phakjira Kanrattanasood (Nanan) as Min
- Natthawat Chainarongsophon (Gun) as Camp
- Suwittayawat Pariyawit as Men
- Jirakit Kuariyakul (Toptap) as Tul
- Chatchawit Techarukpong (Victor) as Terk
- Jirakit Thawornwong (Mek) as View
- Worranit Thawornwong (Mook) as Snow
- Jumpol Adulkittiporn (Off) as Puen

=== Supporting ===
- Puwadon Vejvongsa as Kin
- Watchara Sukchum (Jennie) as Neon
- Sattaphong Phiangphor (Tao) as Tent
- Korawit Boonsri (Gun) as Ter, Gang's boyfriend
- Phurikulkrit Chusakdiskulwibul (Amp) as Gang
- Nisachon Siothaisong as Zen so Sad
- Thitipoom Techaapaikhun (New) as Ray
- Tawan Vihokratana (Tay) as Warm
- Phanuphong Wongthom as Cable
- Thassapak Hsu (Bie) as Tawan
- Weluree Ditsayabut (Fai) as Cake (Tent's girlfriend)

=== Guest ===
- Patcha Poonpiriya (June) as Air (Ep. 10)
