= Warattaya Nilkuha =

Thai actress and model (born 1983)

- วรัทยา นิลคูหา
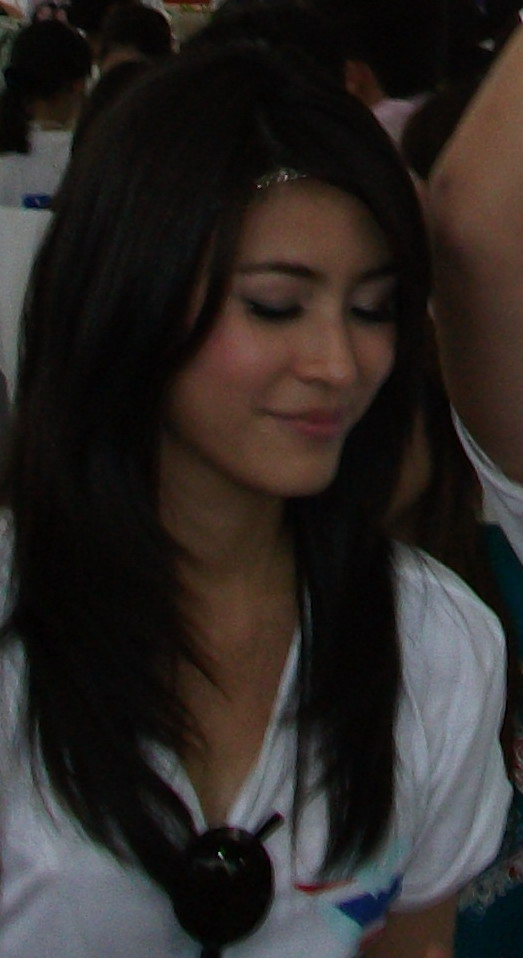
- Warattaya in 2010
- Born: June 11, 1983 (age 43); Ratchaburi, Thailand
- Other name: Jui (จุ๋ย)
- Years active: 2003–present
- Agent: Kantana (2003–2012)
- Spouse: Puttichai Kasetsin (m. 2018)
- Children: 2

Warattaya Nilkuha (Thai: วรัทยา นิลคูหา, RTGS: Waratthaya Ninkhuha; born June 11, 1983) is a Thai actress, TV hostess and model. She graduated with a Bachelor of Publical Sciences from Thammasat University

== Personal life ==
On November 16, 2018, she married actor Puttichai Kasetsin. On November 24, 2022, she welcomed a son. On June 24, 2024, the couple announced they are expecting their second child.

== Filmography ==
=== Dramas ===
| Year | Title | Role | Notes | With | Network |
|---|---|---|---|---|---|
| 2003 | Kassatriya กษัตริยา | Princess Suphankanlaya | Main Role | Arnus Rapanich | Channel 5 |
| 2003 | Maharaj Koo Pandin | N/A | Main Role | Arnus Rapanich | Channel 5 |
| 2004 | Nang Fah Duern Din นางฟ้าเดินดิน | N/A | Main Role | Nattawut Skidjai | Channel 7 |
| 2005 | Ta Lad Nam Dum Nern Rak | N/A | Main Role | Panu Suwanno | Channel 7 |
| 2005 | Nung Ta Wan Pan Dao | N/A | Main Role | Watcharabul Leesuwan | Channel 7 |
| 2006 | Rak Tid Lob รักติดลบ | Palita | Main Role | Siwat Chotchaicharin | Channel 7 |
| 2006 | Talay Jai ทะเลใจ | Rattawun | Main Role | Nattawut Skidjai | Channel 7 |
| 2006 | Sainam Sam Cheewit สายน้ำ สามชีวิต | Naming | Main Role | Thana Suttikamol & Nattawut Skidjai | Channel 7 |
| 2007 | Wiwa Olaewang วิวาห์อรเวง | N/A | Main Role | Veraparb Suparbpaiboon | Channel 7 |
| 2007 | Kom Kon คมคน | N/A | Main Role | Veraparb Suparbpaiboon | Channel 7 |
| 2007 | Fah Mee Tawan Hua Jai Hun Me Ter ฟ้ามีตะวันหัวใจฉันมีเธอ | Naynapa/Naen | Main Role | Sornram Tappituk | Channel 7 |
| 2007 | Poot Sao Prao Saneh ภูตสาวพราวเสน่ห์ | Nisa | Main Role | Wongsakorn Poramathakorn | Channel 7 |
| 2008 | Poot Mae Nam Khong ภูตแม่น้ำโขง | Buapun | Main Role | Sukollawat Kanarot | Channel 7 |
| 2008 | Anuparb Por Khun Ramkhamheng อานุภาพพ่อขุนรามคำแหง | Princess Benjamaat | Main Role | Sukollawat Kanarot | Channel 7 |
| 2008 | Montra Haeng Ruk มนตราแห่งรัก | Maan Mai | Main Role | Santi Visaboonchai | Channel 7 |
| 2009 | Nang Greed นางกรี๊ด | Jirawatee / Jaem | Main Role | Thana Suttikamul | Channel 7 |
| 2009 | Lahut Logan รหัสโลกันต์ | Irin/Venus | Main Role | Santi Visaboonchai | Channel 7 |
| 2010 | Sao Chai Hi-Tech สาวใช้ไฮเทค | Nol Ratsameemarn | Main Role | Akkaphan Namart | Channel 7 |
| 2011 | on Ruk Mae Nam Moon มนต์รักแม่น้ำมูล | Deun | Main Role | Sukollawat Kanarot | Channel 7 |
| 2013 | Buang Wan Wan บ่วงวันวาร | Bua | Main Role | Phakin Khamwilaisak | Channel 5 |
| 2014 | Samee Tee Tra สามีตีตรา | Sai Nampeung / "Peung" | Main Role | Tanawat Wattanaputi | Channel 3 |
| 2014 | Fun Fueng ฝันเฟื่อง | Montira / Montha | Main Role | Puttichai Kasetsin | Channel One |
| 2016 | Gum Lai Mat กำไลมาศ | Riewthong | Main Role | Pongsakorn Mettarikanon & Janie Tienphosuwan | Channel 3 |
| 2017 | Diary of Tootsies 2 ไดอารี่ตุ๊ดซี่ส์ 2 | Dr. Pink (Ep. 10–12) | Guest Role | | GMM 25 |
| 2017 | Mia Luang เมียหลวง | Dr.Wikanda PhanPhakorn (Wi) | Main Role | Krissada Pornweroj | Channel 3 |
| 2017 | Game Maya เกมมายา | Pimdao / "Pim" | Main Role | Puttichai Kasetsin | Channel One |
| 2019 | Plerng Ruk Plerng Kaen เพลิงรักเพลิงแค้น | Auravee Mahawiwatkul | Main Role | Pakorn Chatborirak | Channel 3 |

=== Master of Ceremony: MC ===
| Year | Thai title | Title | Network | Notes | With |
|---|---|---|---|---|---|
| 2004-05 | ฟ้าเมืองไทย | | 5HD1 | | |
| 2006-07 | ดาราปาร์ตี้ | | 5HD1 | | |
| 2007 | กว่าจะเป็นดาว | | Channel 9 | | |
| 2008 | กว่าจะเป็นดาวปาปารัซซี่ | | Channel 9 | | |
| 2012-14 | หนูน้อย กู้อีจู้ | | Workpoint TV | | |
| 2012,13,14,14-15 | ชิงร้อยชิงล้าน ซันไชน์ เดย์ | | Workpoint TV | | |
| 2015 | Let Me In Thailand ศัลยกรรมพลิกชีวิต ซีซั่น 1 | | Workpoint TV | | |
| 2016-17 | Let Me In Thailand ศัลยกรรมพลิกชีวิต ซีซั่น 2 | | Workpoint TV | | |
| 2016-17 | Honey Hero คู่รักนักสู้ | | Workpoint TV | | |
| 2017 | Let Me In Thailand 3 BIG CHANGE | | Workpoint TV | | |
| 2018 | Let Me In Thailand 4 Reborn | | Workpoint TV | | |
| 2021–present | พุฒจุ๋ย หูยดีอ่า | | YouTube:Yerr tv | | |

=== Drama Organizer ===
- 2022 Jangwa Hua Jai Nai Saat - จังหวะหัวใจนายสะอาด (Insight Entertainment, Act9 Productions/PPTVHD36)
