= Love's Coming =

- Theatrical movie poster
- Directed by: Naphat Chaithiangthum
- Written by: Naphat Chaithiangthum; Somchai Vachirajongkol
- Produced by: Wittawat Singlumpong; Aunnika Pooksrisook
- Starring: Suttinut Uengtrakul; Norrapat Sakulsong; Korn Khunatipapisiri; Chanon Santinatornkul; Suraphat Kirivichien
- Production company: Mungmee Productions
- Distributed by: Mungmee Productions
- Release date: 27 February 2014 (Thailand)
- Running time: 108 minutes
- Country: Thailand
- Language: Thai

Love's Coming (Thai: ใช่รักหรือเปล่า) is a 2014 LGBT Thai film, starring Suttinut Uengtrakul and Norrapat Sakulsong. The movie's director is Naphat Chaithiangthum. The film was filmed in 2013 and was released on 27 February 2014.

On 13 December 2014, it was revealed that a sequel was in production, Love's Coming 2, but the title was later changed to Love Love You, and was released in 2015.

== Plot ==
The story reveals a strong friendship between four teenage boys: Pid, Arm, Zee and Gump. Zee asks Gump to hangout several times, but the latter says he has a prior commitment with his neighbor Nai every time, whom he is helping with studying. Zee and the others try several times to find out if their friend is in love or not with the help of Uncle Lek who likes to be called Aunt Alexandra.

== Cast ==
Character	Portrayed by	Remarks
Gump	Suttinut Uengtrakul	Pid, Arm and Zee's best friend. He is Nai's neighbor and tutor, as well his love interest.
Nai	Norrapat Sakulsong	Soda's ex-boyfriend, Gump's neighbor and tutee. Later, Gump's love interest and boyfriend.
Zee	Korn Khunatipapisiri	Gump, Pid and Arm's best friends, Uncle Lex's friend.
Pid	Chanon Santinatornkul	Gump, Arm and Zee's best friend.
Arm	Suraphat Kirivichien	Gump, Pid and Zee's best friend.
Uncle Lex	—N/a	Also known as Alexandra, he is the owner of a coffee shop and Zee's friend.
Mr Chawalit	—N/a	Known as Cha Cha or Chalean, works at the coffee shop. Uncle Lex's employee.
Soda	Jeeraya Sawangthuean	Nai's ex-girlfriend and Gump's love rival.
Gump's Mother	—N/a	Nai's neighbour.
Sa	—N/a	Nai's Mother.
Nai's Father	—N/a	Gump's neighbour
