= Puttichai Kasetsin =

Thai actor (born 1986)

- พุฒิชัย เกษตรสิน
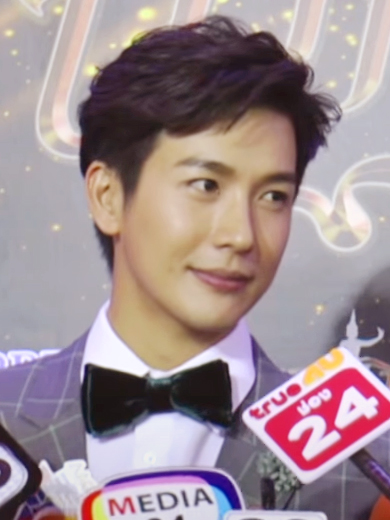
- Puttichai in 2016
- Born: July 3, 1986 (age 40); Damnoen Saduak, Ratchaburi, Thailand
- Other name: Push (พุฒ)
- Occupations: Actor; DJ; TV Host; YouTuber; Drama Organizer
- Years active: 2010–present
- Agent: GMM Grammy
- Spouse: Warattaya Nilkuha (m. 2018)
- Children: 2

Puttichai Kasetsin (Thai: พุฒิชัย เกษตรสิน, RTGS: Phutthichai Kasetsin; born 3 July 1986), nicknamed Push (Thai: พุฒ), is a Thai-Chinese actor, DJ and TV host based in Thailand. He gained popularity in his acting career after starring in Ugly Duckling: Perfect Match, I Wanna Be Sup'tar, and U-Prince: The Handsome Cowboy.

== Early life and education ==
Puttichai was born on 3 July 1986 in Ratchaburi, a province in central Thailand. He is the fourth son in a family of six sons. His parents are of Chinese descent. His family used to be in an agriculture business in Ratchaburi. Puttichai had hoped to become a professional football player before getting persuaded into the entertainment scene by his school senior.

Puttichai completed elementary school at Wantha Maria Ratchaburi School, then had his secondary and high school education at Prasartratprachakit School. He graduated in Communication Arts from Rajabhat Suan Dusit University.

== Career ==
=== 2010–13: Career beginnings ===
Puttichai started his career under GMM Grammy Co., Ltd. as a DJ of HOTWAVE 91.5FM, then later a DJ for Chill FM and a host of O:IC TV show. His acting career began when he received a small role in Koo Rak Tang Kua sitcom by TV Thunder. Next, he got a role as a policeman in Jood Nad Pob series on Channel 3, in which he appeared on Episode 23 - 80. Later, he took on several small roles in lakorns.

=== 2014: Taking on the lead roles ===
In 2014, Exact debuted Puttichai as a lead actor in Leh Nangfah with Wannarot Sonthichai (Vill). Since then, he has slowly started to gain more fans. Push is known to be flirty and silly with his co-stars and quickly becomes friends with them, many saying he's easy to get along with. Push's fame started to grow after every lakorn, making him one of Exact's best actors. Regardless, working as a radio DJ is still his favourite job, as he mentioned "The job has a lot of charm, and each DJ has their own style. Even though I've acted in many TV series, DJ work is still my main priority."

=== 2015–present: The Next Big Thing- The Road to Stardom across Asia ===
In 2015, Puttichai gained more popularity by his work after work. He remained a regular on Thailand's TV screen all through the year. Starting the year with Ugly Duckling: Perfect Match on GMM25 Channel, Puttichai won the hearts of youngsters & new graduates and created "P'Suea Phenomenon". In mid 2015, Puttichai expanded his fanbase to traditional Thai lakorn housewives with Roy Leh Saneh Rai (Hundred Tricks of a Vicious Charmer) on One Channel and to urban white collar group with Club Friday The Series 6 : Kwarm Ruk Mai Pid...Pid Tee...Ter Plian Pai on GMM25 Channel.

In late 2015, he gained recognition for his superstar role in I Wanna Be Sup'tar. All these works helped him almost clean-sweep all the breakthrough awards, including Most Charming Guy Award from Siam Dara Stars Awards 2015, The Heartthrob Award from Hamburger Awards 2015 and Seventeen Choice Hottie Male from SEVENTEEN Choices Awards 2015. Puttichai introduced another mini-series, Love Flight, in which he co-starred Ungsumalynn Sirapatsakmetha at the end of 2015 as a conclusion of his busy year.

In 2017, Puttichai was invited for the first time to participate as the main role in the Chinese drama Stairway to Stardom.

In 2019, he collaborated with Pimchanok Luevisadpaibul (Baifern) in The Fallen Leaves. The drama gained massive popularity across Asia, where Puttichai was also crowned as "National Husband" by Thai nationals of his role as Nira's uncle. Later on that year, in response to the love of Chinese fans, Puttichai held his first fan-meeting in Nanjing, China.

After the success of The Fallen Leaves, Puttichai started to take up several leading roles of Thai remakes from Chinese dramas, like Boss & Me Thai and You are my Heartbeat which he co-stars with Sushar Manaying (Aom) and Davika Hoorne (Mai) respectively. In 2022, Puttichai confirmed to star in Dong Dok Mai alongside four female leads, where he is going to take up the main role as Pongdanai, a young womanizer with vicious charm.

== Personal life ==
On November 16, 2018, he married actress Warattaya Nilkuha. On November 24, 2022, he and his wife welcomed their first child, a son. On June 24 2024, the couple announced they are expecting their second child.

== Filmography ==
=== Television series ===
Year	Title	Role	Network	Notes
2011	Koo Rak Tang Kua	Assawin	Modernine TV	
2011	Joot Nad Pob : Season 2	Burapa Tarathip (Muad Boo)	Channel 3	EP 23–80
2012	Waew Mayura	Wongsakorn	Channel 3	Cameo
2012	Club Friday The Series 1 : Ex-boyfriend	Nott	Green Channel	
2013	Love On Air : Mai Bauk Rak...Tae Rak Mark	Push	Green Channel	
2013	Rak Jing Ping Guer : Love Low Fat	Teacher Ice	Bang Channel	
2013	Forward	Natee	Modernine TV	
2013	Love Balloon	Maug	Bang Channel	
2014	Leh Nang Fah	Theepob	Channel 5	
2014	Fun Fueng	Rattarawee Indharasuwan (Wee)	ONE 31	
2015	Ugly Duckling: Perfect Match	P'Suea Kukamraam (Leo)	GMM 25	
2015	Roy Leh Saneh Rai (Hundred Tricks of a Vicious Charmer)	Kongpope Pattaratanasarn (Kong)	ONE 31	
2015	I Wanna Be Sup'Tar	Win Pakorn	GMM 25	
2015	Club Friday The Series 6 : Kwarm Rak Mai Pid...Pid Tee...Ter Plian Pai	Tor	GMM 25	
2015	Love Flight : Rak Sood Tai Tee Plai Fah	Neumake (Make)	GMM 25	
2016	Puer Ter (For you)	Chanon Thammapitak	ONE 31	
2016	U-Prince: The Handsome Cowboy	Sibtis	GMM 25	
2016	Little Big Dream	Phak	GMM 25	
2016	Game Maya	Gun	ONE 31	
2017	Stairway To Stardom	Duan Cheng Xuan	QQLive	
2017	Flower Ring	Laising (Singh)	GMM 25	
2018	My Dear Loser Series: Happily Ever After	Tonkla (Ton)	GMM 25	
2018	Happy Birthday	Tee	GMM 25	
2018	Songkram Nak Pun	Tankhun	ONE 31	
2018	Club Friday The Series 10: Rak Rai	Pat	ONE 31	
2019	Bai Mai Tee Plid Plew (The Fallen Leaves)	Chatchavee (Nira's uncle-in-law)	ONE 31	
2019	Songkram Nak Pun: Season 2	Tankhun	ONE 31	
2021	Boss & Me	Payu	GMM 25	
2021	Club Friday the Series Love Seasons Celebration: Unhappy Birthday	Kuea	GMM One	
2022	You are my Heartbeat	Sira Kidjarein (Lom)	PPTV 36	
2022	Dong Dok Mai	Phongdanai	GMM One	
2023	Tee Sood Kong Huajai	Guerkhun	Channel 3	
2023	Kaen		Channel 3	
2023	Patiharn Ruk	Pawee	PPTV 36	

=== Master of Ceremony: MC ===
Year	Thai title	Title	Network	Notes	With
2004-08	O:IC		Channel 5		
2009-15	O:IC		Bang Channel		
2009-11	Pepsi Poll Me Please		Bang Channel		
2010	Cafe' de Song		Bang Channel		
2011	อีเม้าท์ มาเต็ม		Channel 7		
2011	หาเช้า โชว์ค่ำ		Channel 5		
2016-17	เซียนแกะสูตร		One 31		
2017	ร้องล่าเนื้อ		One 31		
2019	Knock The Door ชักสุขเข้าบ้าน		Workpoint TV		
2019	Infinite Challenge Thailand ซุปตาร์ท้าแข่ง		Channel 3		
2019	THE LIFT 5 ล้านสะท้านฟ้า		Channel 3		
2019	Davinci เด็กถอดรหัส		Channel 3		
2020	พ่อบ้านงานเข้า		Workpoint TV		
2021-22	LAZ iCON ไอคอนป๊อบ ตัวท็อปเดบิวต์		One 31		
2021–present	พุฒจุ๋ย หูยดีอ่า		YouTube:Yerr TV		
2022	แฟนกัน 1 day		Workpoint TV		
2022	แฟนพันธุ์แท้ Samsung Galaxy		Workpoint TV		

=== Drama Organizer ===
- 2022 You are my Heartbeat - จังหวะหัวใจนายสะอาด (Insight Entertainment, Act9 Productions/PPTVHD36)

== Awards and nominations ==
Year	Award	Category	Result
2015	Hamburger Award	Rising star of the year	Won
2015	Seventeen Award	Hot guy of the year	Won
2015	1st Attitude Anniversary Award	Best Actor	Won
2015	Thailand Headlines Person of The Year Awards 2015	Person of the Year	Won
2016	Kazz Awards	Rising Actor	Won
2016	MThai Top Talk-About 2016	Top Talk-About Actor	Won
2018	9th Awarding Ceremony to Artists, Entertainment Stars, and Social Media Collaborating in the Smoking Cessation Program	Popular Star	Won

=== Other Honours ===
Year	Honour
2019	TC Candler Asia's Top 100 Most Handsome Faces in The Asia Pacific No. 75
2020	TC Candler Asia's Top 100 Most Handsome Faces in The Asia Pacific No. 84
