= The Judgement (TV series) =

2018 Thai-language television series

- Genre: Crime drama
- Starring: Lapassalan Jiravechsoontornkul; Kacha Nontanan Anchuleepradit; Thanabordee Jaiyen
- Country of origin: Thailand
- Original language: Thai
- No. of seasons: 1
- No. of episodes: 13

Production
- Running time: 47 minutes

Original release
- Network: GMM 25
- Release: August 9 – November 1, 2018

The Judgment is a 2018 Thai-language television series starring Lapassalan Jiravechsoontornkul, Kacha Nontanan Anchuleepradit and Thanabordee Jaiyen. The plot revolves around a 20 year old college student Lookkaew (Lapassalan Jiravechsoontornkul) who is dating Aud (Thanabordee Jaiyen). At a party, someone rapes Lookkaew while she's drunk and photos and videos surface online.

== Cast ==
=== Main Character ===
- Lapassalan Jiravechsoontornkul as Lookkaew Nareerat Satthakul
- Kacha Nontanun Anchuleepradit as Archawin (Archa)
- Thanabordee Jaiyen as Audtachai Laowisedsakul (Aud)

=== Supporting Character ===
- Nara Thepnupa as Somrudee (Som)
- Liewrakolan Pongsatorn as Potae
- Pam Pamiga Sooksawee as Petchpraew
- Mond Tanutchai Vijitvongthong as Namnhao/Namnuea
- Fifa Premanan Sripanich as Jamie
- Apasiri Nitibhon as Buppha (Lookkaew's Stepmother)
- Wasu Sansingkaew as Winai
- Arshiraya Perapatkunchaya as Professor Manita
- Gulasatree Michalsky as Namtarn

=== Cameo ===
- M Phurin Ruangvivatjarus as Aud's friend

== Release ==
The Judgment was released on November 1, 2018 on Netflix streaming but departed in November 2022.
