= Chanon Santinatornkul =

Thai actor (born 1996)

- ชานน สันตินธรกุล
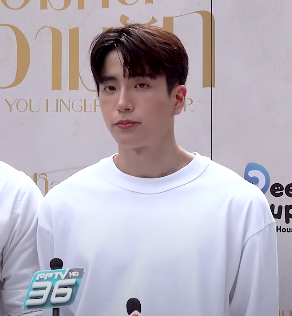
- Chanon in 2022
- Born: 6 June 1996 (age 30); Bangkok, Thailand
- Other name: Nonkul
- Education: Mahidol University International College
- Occupation: Actor
- Years active: 2014–present
- Agents: Nadao Bangkok (2014–2018); Freelance (2018-present)

Chanon Santinatornkul (Thai: ชานน สันตินธรกุล, RTGS: Chanon Santinathonkun; born 6 June 1996), nicknamed Non and also known by the alias Nonkul, is a Thai actor. He is best known for starring in the 2017 film Bad Genius, as well as various television roles with Nadao Bangkok.

== Personal life and education ==
Chanon was born on 6 June 1996 in Bangkok. He graduated school from Bangkok Christian College, and completed undergraduate education in film production at Mahidol University International College. He is a practicing Christian. His pastime interests include exercise—in a 2015 interview, he said he would spend 6 days a week at the gym if he had time.

== Career ==
Chanon first appeared in the 2014 indie gay romance Love's Coming as a supporting character, although his first acting role was in Patcha is Sexy, a short film directed by Nawapol Thamrongrattanarit for Young Love, a reproductive health campaign sponsored by the Ministry of Public Health. He appeared in the film's 2015 sequel Love Love You and Keetarajanipon, an anthology film honouring King Bhumibol Adulyadej, before joining the roster of Nadao Bangkok, a talent management company and subsidiary of the production company GTH (now GDH 559). He became widely noticed for his role as Net, a minor character in the hit TV series Hormones. He then appeared in several television roles, and has also done modelling work and appeared in several TV commercials.

Chanon's role as Bank in the 2017 hit thriller film Bad Genius brought him international fame, especially in China. He has since appeared in the Chinese TV series Blowing in the Wind. He did not renew his contract with Nadao Bangkok when it expired in 2018, and is now working independently.

== Filmography ==
=== Film ===
Year	Title	Role	Notes
2014	Love's Coming	Pid	
2015	Keetarajanipon	Kong	Segment: Smile
2015	Love Love You	Pid	
2017	Bad Genius	Bank	
2019	Love and Run	Due	
2020	One Second Champion	Joe	
2022	Love Destiny: The Movie	prince	
2024	Operation Undead	Mek	

=== Television series ===
Year	Title	Role	Notes	Ref.
2015	Wifi Society	Em	Segment: 15 Years Later	
2015	Hormones: The Series	Net	Season 3	
2016	Love Songs Love Series	So	Segment: Phuean Sanit	
2016	I See You	Manop	Guest role	
2016–2017	Bang Rak Soi 9/1	Earth	Season 1	
2016	I Was Born in the Reign of Rama IX	Max		
2017	Love Songs Love Series To Be Continued	So	Segment: Phuean Sanit	
2017	Project S	Archwin	Segment: Shoot! I Love You	
2019	Bangkok Love Stories: Plead	Tee		
2019	Blowing in the Wind (强风吹拂)	Chen Yi Lu		
2019	Dive (扑通扑通的青春)	Witt		
2021	46 Days	Korn		
2021	The Revenge	Patawee/Wee		
2022	Wannabe	Puen		
2022	23:23	Win		
2023	Oh No! Here Comes Trouble	Yang Ning	Guest role	
2023	I Feel You Linger in the Air	Jom	Main role	
2023	Find Yourself	Shane	Main role	

== Awards and nominations ==
- 27th Suphannahong National Film Award for Best Actor, from Bad Genius
- 26th Bangkok Critics Assembly Award for Best Actor, from Bad Genius
- 31st Royal Phra Surasawadee Award for Best Actor, from Bad Genius
- 8th Thai Film Director Award for Best Actor, from Bad Genius
- 15th Starpics Award for Best Actor, from Bad Genius
- 25th Asian Television Awards nomination for Best Actor, from Bangkok Love Stories: Plead
- 5th Asian Academy Creative Awards, Thailand National Winner for Best Actor in a leading role from Wannabe
- 5th Asian Academy Creative Awards nomination for Best Actor in a leading role from Wannabe
- 27th Asian Television Awards nomination for Best Actor in a Leading Role from The Revenge
