= Suphakorn Sriphotong =

Thai actor (born 1993)

- ศุภกร ศรีโพธิ์ทอง
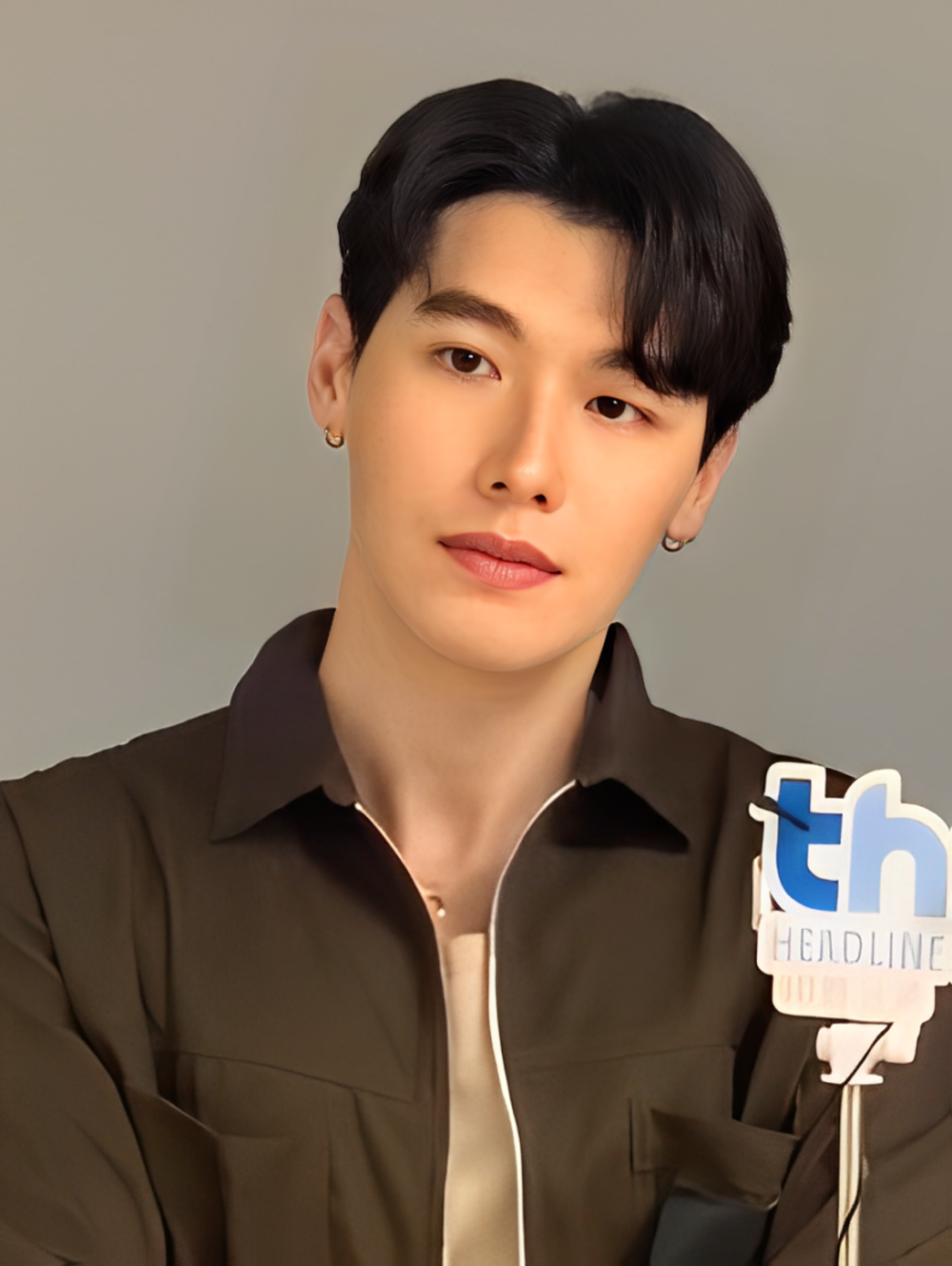
- Suphakorn in April 2025
- Born: 23 October 1993 (age 33); Bangkok, Thailand
- Other names: Pod, Plapodd
- Education: Princess Sirindhorn's College; Dusit Thani College
- Occupation: Actor
- Years active: 2016—present
- Agent: GMMTV (2016 - present)
- Known for: Sun in Kiss Me Again and Dark Blue Kiss; Leo in 3 Will Be Free; Tonhon in Tonhon Chonlatee
- Height: 183 cm (6 ft 0 in)

Suphakorn Sriphotong (Thai: ศุภกร ศรีโพธิ์ทอง; born 23 October 1993), nicknamed Pod (Thai: ป๊อด), is a Thai actor signed to GMMTV. He is known for starring in the television series Dark Blue Kiss (2019) and Tonhon Chonlatee (2020).

== Early life and education ==
Suphakorn was born in Bangkok, Thailand. He graduated high school from Princess Sirindhorn's College and earned his bachelor's degree of Business Administration (Culinary Arts and Kitchen Management) from Dusit Thani College.

== Career ==
Suphakorn won a bronze medal of freestyle poultry cooking competition (Junior) in the individual category from Thailand's International Culinary Cup (TICC) 2012. He then opened a fried chicken shop named "Deep Fly", which he promoted in the GMMTV program The Route in 2016.

He began his entertainment career in 2018 as an artist under GMMTV. He made his acting debut with the 2018 BL drama Kiss Me Again, playing Sun. In 2019, he played a supporting role in the drama 3 Will Be Free. In the same year, he starred in the BL drama Dark Blue Kiss where he reprised his role as Sun as a main role.

In 2020, he starred in the titular role of Tonhon in the drama Tonhon Chonlatee alongside Thanawat Rattanakitpaisan (Khaotung). The drama was a success and hit in Thailand and 33 countries where it achieved a cult following. He received positive reviews for his portrayal of Tonhon which led to increased popularity for him.

== Filmography ==
=== Television series ===
Key
| † | Denotes television productions that have not yet been released |

| Year | Title | Role | Notes | Ref |
|---|---|---|---|---|
| 2018 | Kiss Me Again | Sun | Supporting role | |
| 2019 | 3 Will Be Free | Leo (Neo's brother) | Supporting role | |
| 2019 | Dark Blue Kiss | Sun | Supporting role | |
| 2020 | Tonhon Chonlatee | Tonhon | Main role | |
| 2022 | Devil Sister | Jin | Supporting role | |
| 2022 | Mama Gogo | Mudaeng | Supporting role | |
| 2022 | My Dear Donovan | Aoo | Supporting role | |
| 2023 | Hidden Agenda | Wave | Supporting role | |
| 2023 | Find Yourself | Champ | Supporting role | |
| 2024 | Beauty Newbie | Third | Supporting role | |
| 2024 | Wandee Goodday | "Ter" Kawin Sukhaphisit | Supporting role | |
| 2024 | Pluto | Batman | Guest role | |
| 2025 | Break Up Service | Art | Guest role | |
| 2025 | Boys in Love | "Nut" Natdanai Hathaiphan | Supporting role | |
| 2025 | I Love 'A Lot Of' You | Joe | Guest role | |
| 2025 | The Ex-Morning | Suwit | Supporting role | |
| 2026 | Only Friends: Dream On | Gameplay | Supporting role | |
| TBA | 17th Spring † | Karn | Supporting role | |
| TBA | Pit Stop † | TBA | Supporting role | |
