= Kiss: The Series =

2016 Thai television series

- Official series poster
- Thai: Kiss: The Series – รักต้องจูบ
- Genre: Romantic comedy
- Created by: GMMTV
- Directed by: Chatkaew Susiwa
- Starring: Jirakit Thawornwong; Lapassalan Jiravechsoontornkul; Sattaphong Phiangphor; Worranit Thawornwong
- Country of origin: Thailand
- Original language: Thai
- No. of episodes: 16

Production
- Running time: 60–75 minutes
- Production company: GMMTV

Original release
- Network: GMM 25; LINE TV
- Release: 10 January – 24 April 2016

Related
- Kiss Me Again; Dark Blue Kiss; Our Skyy

Kiss: The Series (Thai: Kiss: The Series – รักต้องจูบ; Kiss: The Series – Rak Tong Chup) is a 2016 Thai television series starring Jirakit Thawornwong (Mek), Lapassalan Jiravechsoontornkul (Mild), Sattaphong Phiangphor (Tao), Worranit Thawornwong (Mook).

Directed by Chatkaew Susiwa and produced by GMMTV, the series premiered on GMM 25 and LINE TV on 10 January 2016, airing on Sundays at 20:00 ICT and 22:00 ICT, respectively. The series concluded on 24 April 2016.

== Cast and characters ==
Below are the cast of the series:

=== Main ===
- Jirakit Thawornwong (Mek) as Thada
- Lapassalan Jiravechsoontornkul (Mild) as Sandee
- Sattaphong Phiangphor (Tao) as Na
- Worranit Thawornwong (Mook) as Sanrak

=== Supporting ===
- Noelle Klinneam (Tiny) as Khun Jane
- Tawan Vihokratana (Tay) as Phubodin Rachatraku (Pete)
- Thitipoom Techaapaikhun (New) as Phanuwat Chotiwat (Kao)
- Nachat Juntapun (Nicky) as June
- Phakjira Kanrattanasood (Nanan) as Ella
- Pop Khamgasem as Chacha
- Kunchanuj Kengkarnka (Kan) as Thew
- Sivakorn Lertchuchot (Guy) as First
- Korawit Boonsri (Gun) as Noina
- Rita Ramnarong (Chacha) as Fahsai
- Rutricha Phapakithi (Ciize) as May / Mail

== Soundtracks ==
Song title	Romanized title	Artist	Ref.
Kiss	N/A	Sirintip Hanpradit (Rose)	
เพื่อนสนิท	Phuean Sanit	Jirakit Thawornwong (Mek); Lapassalan Jiravechsoontornkul (Mild)	
