= Kaew Lom Phet =

Kaew Lom Phet (Thai: แก้วล้อมเพชร, RTGS: Kaeo Lom Phet, lit. "glass encircles diamonds") is a Thai television soap opera produced by Xact and Scenario and broadcast on Channel 5 in 2008–2009. It is a remake of the 2001 drama Lueat Hong.

== Cast ==
=== Kitjakorns ===
Son Songpaisarn as Cheewin
Chayatorn Setjinda as Karn
Airin Yoogthatat as Kaewkao
Chaiyapol Pupart as Chanok
Utumporn Silapan as Lada
Chomchay Chatwilai as Sajee
Tatsana Seneewong Na Ayuthaya as Pin

=== Pikul's family ===
Kamolchanok Komoltithi as Pikul
Wannarot Sonthichai as Nampetch
Thong Wattana as Det

== Broadcasting ==
KVLA 56.5: August 11, 2014 - September 14, 2014

== Running Time ==
- 35 min. (1-35 Set)
- 45 min. (Ntry Set, Sohu Dubbed Version)
- Random (Regular)

== Sources ==
- "Chinese Dubbed Version on Sohu".
- "Khmer Dubbed Version on khdrama.com".
