= Lapassalan Jiravechsoontornkul =

Thai actress and model

- ลภัสลัล จิรเวชสุนทรกุล
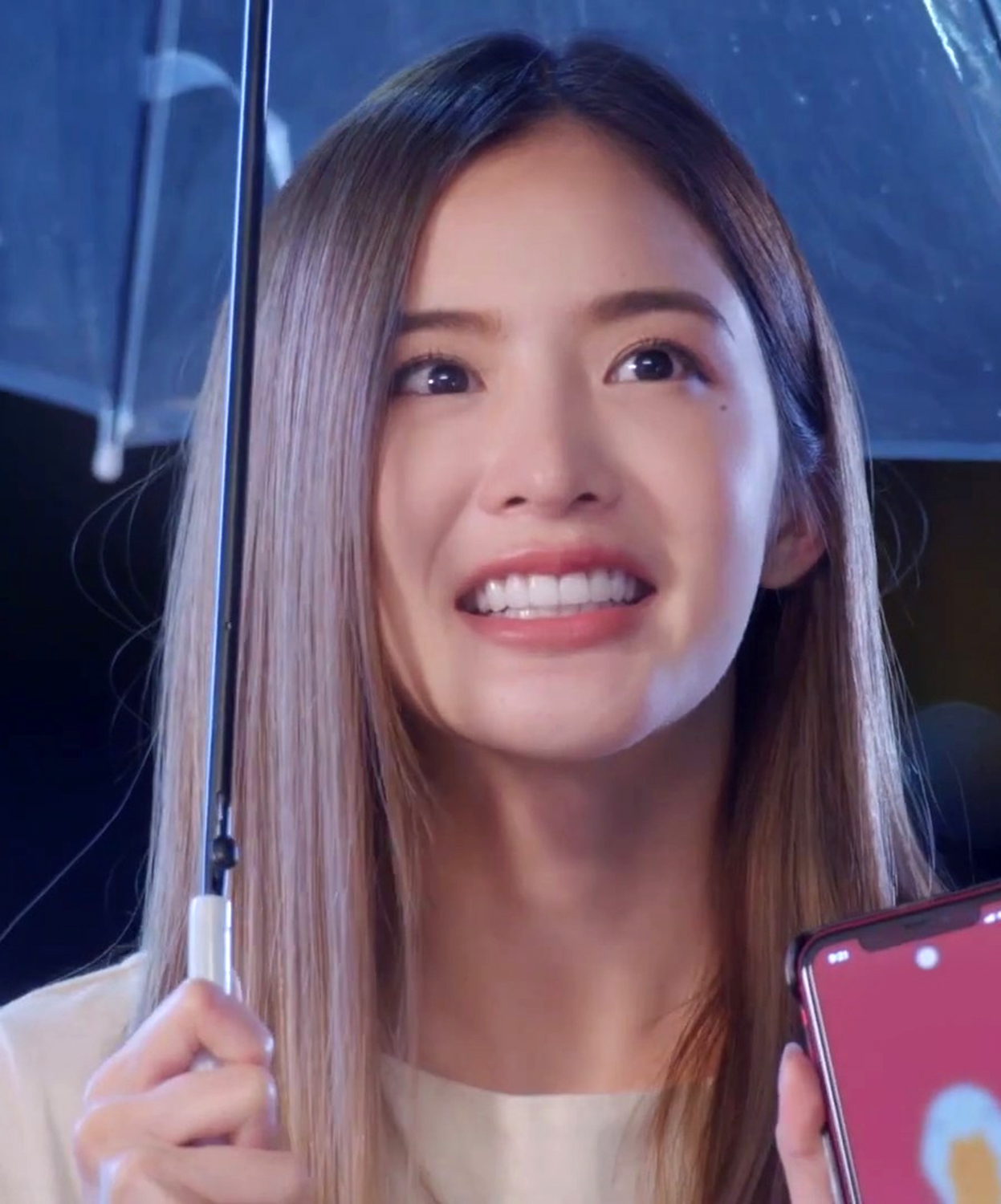
- Lapassalan in 2023
- Born: Wiraporn Jiravechsoontornkul; 7 December 1994 (age 31); Bangkok, Thailand
- Other name: Mild
- Education: College of Communication Arts, Rangsit University
- Occupation: Actress
- Years active: 2011–present
- Notable work: Ugly Duckling Series: Don't : U-Prince : Bad Politics

Lapassalan Jiravechsoontornkul
- Thai: ลภัสลัล จิรเวชสุนทรกุล
- RTGS: Laphatsalan Chirawetsunthonkun
- IPA: [lá.pʰát.sà.lan t͡ɕì.rá.wêːt.sǔn.tʰɔːn.kun]

Wiraporn Jiravechsoontornkul
- Thai: วิรพร จิรเวชสุนทรกุล
- RTGS: Wiraphon Chirawetsunthonkun
- IPA: [wí.rá.pʰɔːn t͡ɕì.rá.wêːt.sǔn.tʰɔːn.kun]

Mild
- Thai: มายด์
- RTGS: Mai
- IPA: [maːi]

Lapassalan Jiravechsoontornkul (Thai: ลภัสลัล จิรเวชสุนทรกุล; born 7 December 1994 as Wiraporn), nicknamed Mild (Thai: มายด์), also known by the pseudonym WJMild, is a Thai actress. She is best known for her role in the 2015 Thai television series Ugly Duckling Series: Don't, which became one of the most viewed teen dramas in Thailand, and made her one of the most popular television stars in the country.

== Filmography ==
=== Film ===
Year	Film	Role	Ref.
2013	Jit Sam Pat 3D	Gaew	
2013	Love Syndrome	English	
2013	Super Salaryman	Bo	
2015	Ratijut Tee 6	Fern	
2020	Sabpaak Jai Naai Jomying	Anna	

=== Television series ===
Year	Series	Role	Notes	Ref.
2013	Nong Mai Rai Borisut	Namkhing		
2013	Hormones	Mint	Guest	
2014	Suae See Foon	Ong		
2015	Ugly Duckling Series: Pity Girl	Maewnam		
2015	Ugly Duckling Series: Don't	Maewnam		
2015	Ugly Duckling Series: Boy's Paradise	Maewnam	Guest	
2016	Kiss: The Series	Sandee		
2016	Love Songs Love Stories: Mai Kang Ying Pae	Minnie		
2016	I See You	New		
2017	Love and Lies	Belle		
2017	Under Her Nose	Thaenchai		
2017	U-Prince: The Badly Politics	Cherrymilk		
2017	Love Songs Love Series: Please Send Someone to Love Me	YuJin/Jin		
2017	Love Books Love Series: Secret & Summer	Summer		
2018	Kiss Me Again	Sandee		
2018	The Judgement (TV series)	Lookkaew		
2018	Happy Birthday	Thannam		
2018	Social Syndrome	Mew Mint		
2019	3 Will Be Free	Miw		
2019	Plerng Ruk Plerng Kaen	Faye		
2019	Dark Blue Kiss	Sandee		
2020	Girl Next Room: Motorbike Baby	Danglek/Duchess	Guest	
2020	Girl Next Room: Midnight Fantasy	Danglek/Duchess	Guest	
2020	Oum Rak Game Luang	Tokyo		
2020	Girl Next Room: Richy Rich	Danglek/Duchess		
2020	Girl Next Room: Security Love	Danglek/Duchess	Guest	
2020	Sabpaak Jai Naai Jomying	Anna		
2021	Duang Jai Nai Montra	Mika/Matira		
2021	46 Days	Noina		
2022	Sabpaak Jai Naai Jomying 2	Anna		
2022	Sai Lub Lip Gloss	Namphueng		
2023	The Jungle			

- Farmhouse
- Penny Wafer Roll
