= Love at First Hate =

2018 Thai television series

- Official series poster
- Thai: Love at First Hate – มารร้ายคู่หมายรัก
- Genre: Romantic comedy; Drama
- Created by: GMMTV
- Based on: มารร้ายคู่หมายรัก by Ancharee
- Starring: Yuke Songpaisan; Worranit Thawornwong
- Country of origin: Thailand
- Original language: Thai
- No. of episodes: 13

Production
- Running time: 50 minutes
- Production companies: GMMTV; On & On Infinity

Original release
- Network: One31; LINE TV; GMM 25 (Rerun)
- Release: 14 September – 7 December 2018

Love at First Hate (Thai: Love at First Hate – มารร้ายคู่หมายรัก; Love at First Hate – Man Rai Khu Mai Rak) is a 2018 Thai television series starring Yuke Songpaisan (Son) and Worranit Thawornwong (Mook).

Produced by GMMTV together with On & On Infinity, the series was one of the ten television series for 2018 showcased by GMMTV in their "Series X" event on 1 February 2018. It premiered on One31 and LINE TV on 14 September 2018, airing on Fridays at 22:00 ICT and 23:00 ICT, respectively. The series concluded on 7 December 2018.

The series was rerun on GMM 25 from 30 April 2019 to 11 June 2019, airing on Mondays and Tuesdays at 21:25 ICT.

== Cast and characters ==
Below are the cast of the series:

=== Main ===
- Yuke Songpaisan (Son) as Paniti / Dr. Pup
- Worranit Thawornwong (Mook) as Kluay

=== Supporting ===
- Carissa Springett as Ploy
- Weerayut Chansook (Arm) as Tawan
- Sivakorn Lertchuchot (Guy) as Dr. Oh
- Seo Ji Yeon as Soncha
- Watchara Sukchum (Jennie) as Joob
- Phakjira Kanrattanasood (Nanan) as Dr. Mint
- Apasiri Nitibhon (Um) as Mae Napa
- Thanongsak Suphakan (Nong)
- Prachakorn Piyasakulkaew (Sun) as Dr. Golf

=== Guest ===
- Pattarapol Kantapoj (Dew) as เจ

== Soundtrack ==
| Song title | Romanized title | Artist | Ref. |
|---|---|---|---|
| จริงใจหรือแกล้งให้ไหวหวั่น | Jing Jai Reu Klang Hai Wai Wan | Worranit Thawornwong (Mook) | |
| เสียงที่ดังไม่พอ | Sieng Tee Dung Mai Paw | Phurikulkrit Chusakdiskulwibul (Amp) | |
