= Yuke Songpaisan =

Thai actor (born 1988)

Yuke Songpaisarn
- ยุกต์ ส่งไพศาล
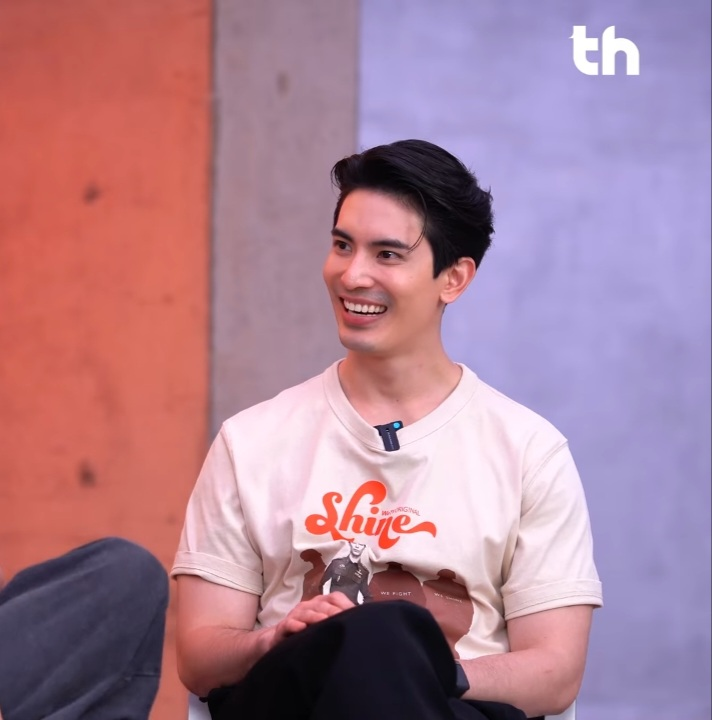
- Yuke in August 2025
- Born: 12 November 1988 (age 37); Bangkok, Thailand
- Other name: Son (สน)
- Education: Chulalongkorn University (Faculty of Engineering)
- Occupation: Actor
- Years active: 2007–present
- Agent: ONE 31 HD (2008–2020)
- Height: 1.85 m (6 ft 1 in)

Yuke Songpaisarn (Thai: ยุกต์ ส่งไพศาล; RTGS: Yuk Songphaisan, born 12 November 1988), nicknamed Son (Thai: สน) is a Thai actor.

== Life ==
Yuke Songpaisarn comes from a fine family, consisting of his parents and one younger sister. His education and public service are his number one priorities. As an alumnus of Chulalongkorn University, he often returns to give talks to students, as well as donating towards the school and environment.

=== Career ===
Yuke's entertainment career started from the 9th grade as he was featured in commercials, magazines, fashion/promotional events, and various music videos (most notably "Poo Chai Jai Yen" by Four-Mod). His debut role was leading in Kaew Lorm Petch alongside his most memorable leading lady, Wannarot Sonthichai (Vill). He earned the opportunity to fulfill his love for singing in 2013 with Grammy's subsidiary label, Frontage, leading the Kaen Sanaeha OST with “Jai Aoei (Oh My Heart)” and releasing his ballad “Roem Ton Rak Gan Mai (Back to Love)”

== Filmography ==
=== Television series ===
Year	Title	Thai Title	Role
2008–2009	Kaew Lorm Petch	แก้วล้อมเพชร	Cheewin
2009–2010	Yark Yood Tawan Wai Tee Plai Fah	อยากหยุดตะวันไว้ที่ปลายฟ้า	Namcheo
2010	Malai Sarm Chai	มาลัยสามชาย	Prince Direak-Ruj
2011	Reuan Pae	เรือนแพ	Chen
2012	Likit Fah Cha Ta Din	ลิขิตฟ้าชะตาดิน	Jang
2012	Sao Noi	สาวน้อย	San / Siam
2012–2013	Pentor Kunthep	เป็นต่อขั้นเทพ	Kunthep
2013	Hua Jai Rua Puang	หัวใจเรือพ่วง	Na Pat
2013	Kaen Sanaeha	แค้นเสน่หา	Chat
2014	Narak	น่ารัก	Patai
2014	Malee Rerng Rabum	มาลีเริงระบำ	Thog
2014–2016	Pentor New Season	เป็นต่อ New Season	Kunthep
2014–2015	Songkram Nang Ngarm	สงครามนางงาม	Kong
2015	Tawan Tud Burapha	ตะวันตัดบูรพา	Burapa
2016	Duang Jai Pisut	ดวงใจพิสุทธิ์	Haht
2016	We Were Born in the 9th Reign Series	เราเกิดในรัชกาลที่ 9 เดอะซีรีส์	
2017–2021	Pentor	เป็นต่อ	Kunthep
2017	Tae Pang Korn	แต่ปางก่อน	Than Chai Yai(1st & 2nd life) / Jilakhorm (3rd life)
2017	Mueng Maya Live The Series Maya Ren Ruk	เมืองมายา Live ตอน มายาเร้นรัก	Don
2018	Kahon Maha Ratuek	กาหลมหรทึก	(Cameos)
2018	Det Pik Nangfa	เด็ดปีกนางฟ้า	Pathapee / Din
2018	Love at First Hate	มารร้ายคู่หมายรัก	Paniti / Dr. Pup
2019	Sataya Tis Tarn	สัตยาธิฐาน	Pakin / Tod
2019	The Stranded (TV series)	เคว้ง	Kraam's father
2020	Leh Game Rak	เล่ห์เกมรัก	Akkee / Seifer
2020	Neth Mahunnop	เนตรมหรรณพ	Prompoom
2021	The Prince Who Turns Into A Frog	กวุ่นวายเจ้าชายกบ	Kin / Tonnam
2021	Club Friday the Series 12: Ruk Tong Yaeng	Club Friday The Series 12 Uncharted Love รักต้องแย่ง	Nai
2022	Bad Beauty	โฉมโฉด	Wanphichit
2023	Fai Luang	ไฟลวง	Noppharuj Bunyakorn (Ruj)
2025	Shine	ไฟชาย	Krailert Suwannaphat
TBA	Patiharn Ruk	ปาฏิหาริย์รัก	Chatchawin

=== Film ===
Year	Title	Thai Title	Role
2019	The Real Ghosts	ช่อง-ส่อง-ผี	Dol

=== Ost. ===
- 2013 () -
- 2013 () Ost. Kaen Sanaeha -
- 2014 () Ost. Malee Rerng Rabum -
- 2014 () Ost. Malee Rerng Rabum -
- 2018 () Ost. Det Pik Nangfa -

=== Music video appearance ===
- 2007 Poo Chay Jai Yen (ผู้ชายใจเย็น) - Four–Mod (Kamikaze/YouTube: welovekamikaze)
- 2008 Gae Ngow Hai Mai (แก้เหงาให้ไหม) - Paweesuda Janket (Mae The Star 4) (One Music/YouTube:oneMusic)
- 2008 Yoo Pur Tur (อยู่เพื่อเธอ) - Suparuj Techatanon (Ruj The Star 4) (One Music/YouTube: GMM GRAMMY OFFICIAL)
- 2011 Karng Karng Hua Jai (ข้างๆหัวใจ) -Napat Injaiuea (One Music/YouTube: oneMusic)
- 2017 Kae Nee Gaw Sook Jai (แค่นี้ก็สุขใจ) - Cocktail (Genie Records/YouTube: Genierock)
- 2018 CHANCE (โอกาส) - J.E.E.P. (LOVEiS Entertainment/YouTube:LOVEiS+)

== Awards ==
- The Most Popular Overseas Artist, 2013 Asian Idol Awards in Beijing, China for TV Series Likhit Fa Chata Din
- Most Popular Male Actor, 2012 Mekhala Awards for TV Series Sao Noi (total 6 winners in this category).
