= Jirakit Kuariyakul =

Thai actor (born 1994)

- จิรกิตติ์ คูอาริยะกุล
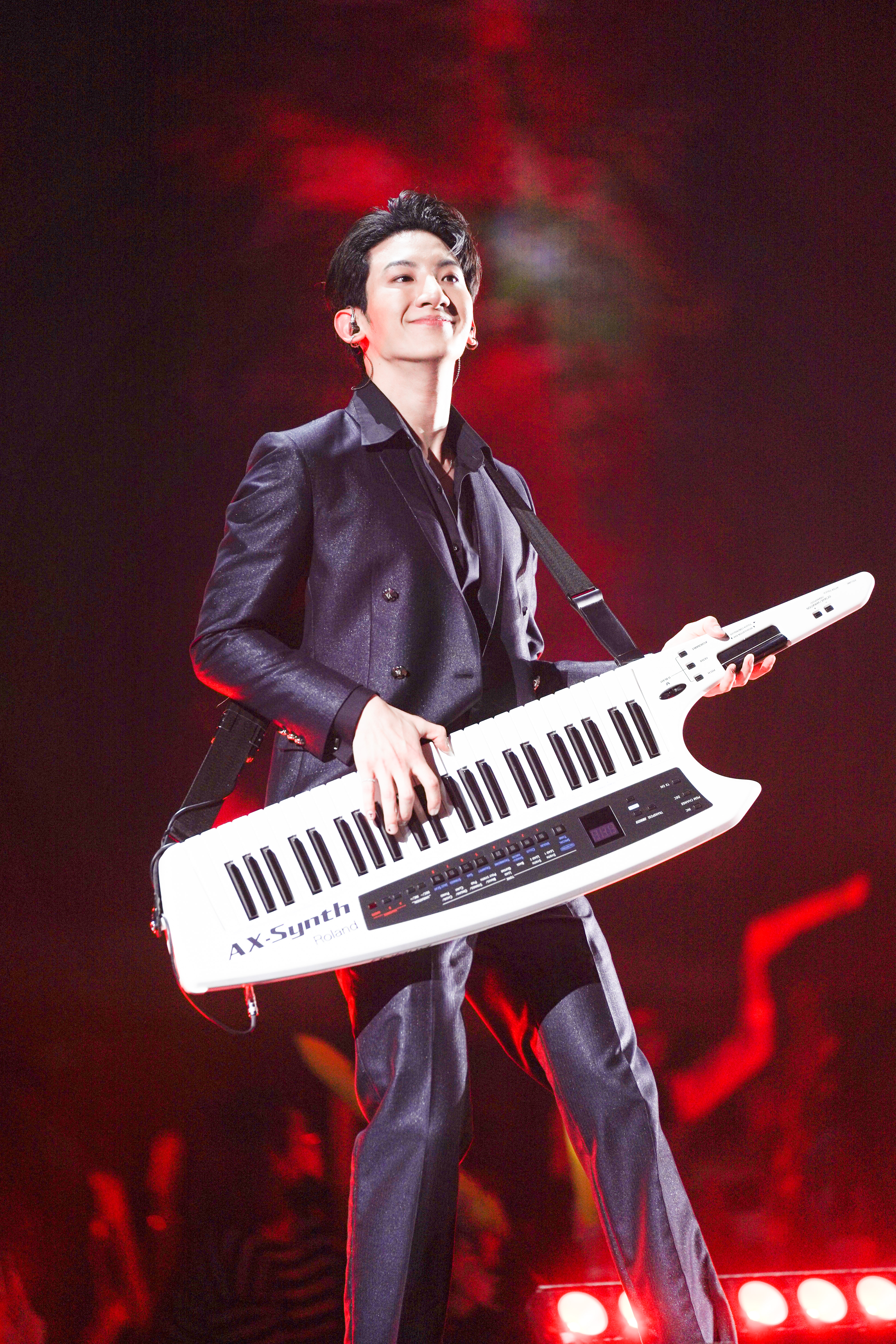
- Born: 1 May 1994 (age 32); Nan Province, Thailand
- Other name: Toptap
- Education: Mahidol University International College
- Occupation: Actor
- Agent: GMMTV
- Known for: Tul in Room Alone 401–410 and Room Alone 2; Boss in Senior Secret Love: My Lil Boy 2; Type in 2gether; Ai in Tonhon Chonlatee; PP in 3 Will Be Free

Jirakit Kuariyakul (Thai: จิรกิตติ์ คูอาริยะกุล; born 1 May 1994), nicknamed Toptap (Thai: ท็อปแท๊ป), is a Thai actor and entrepreneur. He began his acting career in 2014 with a supporting role as Poom in Love Sick. He gained recognition for his portrayal of Tul in Room Alone 401–410 (2014) and its sequel Room Alone 2 (2015). Kuariyakul further established his presence in the Thai entertainment industry with roles such as Boss in Senior Secret Love: My Lil Boy 2 (2016), Type in 2gether (2020), and Ai in Tonhon Chonlatee (2020). After nearly a decade with GMMTV, he chose not to renew his contract in December 2022 to pursue independent projects and focus on his business ventures.

== Early life and education ==
Jirakit was born in Nan Province, Thailand. He completed his secondary education at Strisrinan School. He graduated with a bachelor's degree in business administration, major in marketing at Mahidol University International College. He was an exchange student for a year in America for an AFS program.

== Career ==
He started his acting career in 2014 by playing a support role in Love Sick (2014). In the same year, he got the main role of Tul in Room Alone 401-410 (2014). He went on to play main and support roles in several television series such as U-Prince (2016), SOTUS (2016), Senior Secret Love: Puppy Honey 2 (2017) and Water Boyy (2017).

He recently played the role of PP in 3 Will Be Free (2019) and Type in 2gether: The Series, Still 2gether (2020) and 2gether: The Movie (2021).

After his successful role in 2gether: The Series, Still 2gether and 2gether: The Movie with his on-screen partner, Chinnarat Siripongchawalit (Mike), their tandem returned in Tonhon Chonlatee as Ai and Ni, a secret couple and a roommate of Tonhon (played by Supakorn Sriphotong (Pod)).

== Filmography ==
=== Television ===
Year	Title	Role	Notes	Ref.
2014	Love Sick Season 1	Poom	Support role	
2014	Room Alone 401-410	Tul	Main role	
2015	Love Sick Season 2	Poom	Support role	
2015	The School	Toptap	Main role	
2015	Room Alone 2	Tul	Main role	
2016	U-Prince: The Handsome Cowboy	Hed	Support role	
2016	SOTUS	Jay	Support role	
2016	Senior Secret Love: My Lil Boy 2	Boss	Main role	
2017	Water Boyy	Kan	Support role	
2018	Mint To Be	Wave	Support role	
2019	Boy For Rent	Tan	Support role	
2019	3 Will Be Free	PP	Support role	
2019	Blacklist	Dark	Support role	
2020	2gether: The Series	Type	Support role	
2020	Still 2gether	Type	Support role	
2020	Tonhon Chonlatee	Ai	Support role	
2021	2gether: The Movie	Type	Support role	
2022	Mama Gogo: The Series	Auto	Support role	
2022	Star and Sky: Sky In Your Heart	Ou	Support role	
2022	P.S. I Hate You	Rut	Guest role	

== Personal life ==
Aside from his acting career, Jirakit owns two restaurants namely Fuku Intown and 3Brothers Chicken Rice, which he co-owns with fellow actors Perawat Sangpotirat and Khoo Pei-Cong.
