= Wannarot Sonthichai =

Thai actress

- วรรณรท สนธิไชย
- Born: Wannarot Sonthichai; April 10, 1989 (age 37); Thailand
- Other names: Vill; Vill Wannarot
- Education: Silpakorn University Faculty of Archaeology Anthropology major
- Occupations: Model; actress; YouTuber
- Years active: 2008–present

Wannarot Sonthichai (Thai: วรรณรท สนธิไชย; born 10 April 1989), nickname Vill is a Thai film and television actress from Exact/OneHD. She is known for her roles in Kaew Lom Phet, Sao Noi, Dok Ruk Rim Tang, Sud Sai Pan, and Ngao Jai.

== Early life ==
Wannarot Sonthichai was born on 10 April 1989 in Bangkok, Thailand. Her mother is Kate Sonthichai. She has a younger sister. As a child, she took piano lessons and dance classes. She entered the Thai entertainment industry alongside Yuke Songpaisan when they auditioned together at Exact. Both of them were later paired up and debuted as leads in the lakorn, Kaew Lorm Petch. It was a success and achieved a rating of 17 for its highest rating for an episode. They became one of the most popular koojins (golden couples) during that era.

== Filmography ==
=== Film ===
Year	Title	Role	Notes
2013	Jan Dara: Final Capture	Malai (Ken's wife)	Supporting Role
2016	Take Me Home	Tubtim	Main Role

=== Television ===
Year	Title	Role	Notes	Channel
2008	Kwarm Lub Kaung Superstar	Herself (Ep.21,22, 33,34)	Guest Role	Channel 5
2008	Kaew Lom Phet	Nampetch	Main Role	Channel 5
2009	Sakul Ga	Dao	Main Role	Channel 5
2010	Dok Ruk Rim Tang	Anusorn & Ood / Anucha	Main Role	Channel 5
2010	Pen Tor	Gift (Ep.274)	Guest Role	Channel 3
2010	Malai Sarm Chai	Noo Yim	Support Role	Channel 5
2011	Talad Arom	Gang	Main Role	Channel 5
2011	Karm Wayla Ha Ruk	Praepim / "Pim" (younger)	Guest Role	Channel 5
2011	Kohn Teun	Saman	Main Role	Channel 5
2012	Nam Kuen Hai Reab Ruk	Wun	Main Role	Channel 5
2012	Sao Noi	Nid / Wanida	Main Role	Channel 9
2012	Nang Singha Sabad Chor	Doctor Wartsana	Main Role	Channel 5
2013	Koo Gum	Wanrudi (Ep.14)	Guest Role	Channel 5
2013	Sud Sai Pan	Gandaowasee / Gandaomanee Girinisuan	Main Role	Channel 5
2014	Leh Nangfah	Lallalit / "Beauty"	Main Role	Channel 5
2015	Ngao Jai	Metinee / "Me"	Main Role	One 31
2016	Club Friday The Series Season 7: Home	Sha	Main Role	GMM25
2016	Rak Fun Thalob	Priew	Main Role	One 31
2016	Rang Mai Hua Jai Derm	Nalantha	Main Role	One 31
2016	Soot Ruk Chun La Moon	LookTarn	Main Role	One 31
2016	We Were Born in the 9th Reign Series	Bangkwung	Main Role	One 31
2017	Tae Pang Korn	Jao Nang Noy / Mankaew / Rachawadee / Untra	Main Role	One 31
2017	A Love to Kill	Inthira	Main Role	One 31
2017	Paragit Likhit Huajai	Jarawee / "Ja"	Main Role	One 31
2018	Kahon Maha Ratuek	Pananij Phiromruj	Main Role	One 31
2018	Bangkok Naruemit	Wad (Past) / Pangmas (Present)	Main Role	One 31
2019	Talay Rissaya	Fahsai	Main Role	One 31
2019	The Charming Step Mom	Tammy / Cherry	Main Role	GMM25
2019	Sanya Kaen Saen Rak	Wongwen	Main Role	One 31
2020	Kiss of the Cobra	Snake Goddess Anyawadee / Anyanee	Main Role	One 31
2020	Ruk Laek Pop	Wan	Main Role	One 31
2021	The Prince Who Turns into a Frog	Lookpat	Main Role	One 31
2022	My Lovely Bodyguard	Saraphi	Main Role	One 31
2022	Club Friday 14: Love & Belief	Mai	Main Role	One 31
2025	Hypnotic	Kunnari	Main Role	One 31
2026	The Last Duel	Suphankanlaya	Main Role	One 31
2026	Heman Tawan Ron	Jan	Main Role	One 31
2026	Fai Phai		Main Role	Amarin TV

=== Music videos ===
1. "Kwarm Poog Pun (Seu Kwarm Ruk) Mai Dai" Gaam The Star
2. "Yoo Peur Ter" Ruj the star
3. "Hug" Bie Sukrit Wisedkaew
4. "Yood Tee Ter" Premmanat Suwannanon
5. "Ter Kher Thang Hua Jai" Gam Koonkornpach
6. "Ngao Nai Hua Jai" Pex Zeal & Noona Neungthida Sopon
7. "Tee Ruk" Ann Thitima

== Commercials ==
- NEUTROGENA
- ESSENTIAL DAMAGE CARE
- nivea super mousse

== Advertising ==
Year	Thai title	Title	Notes	With
2020	ธนาคารออมสิน	Government Savings Bank		Thanapat Kawila; Anchasa Mongkhonsamai

== FilmographyMC ==
Television

- 20 : On Air ()

Online

- 20 : On Air YouTube:Vill Wannarot
