= Korn Khunatipapisiri =

Thai actor, model and dancer

- กร คุณาธิปอภิสิริ
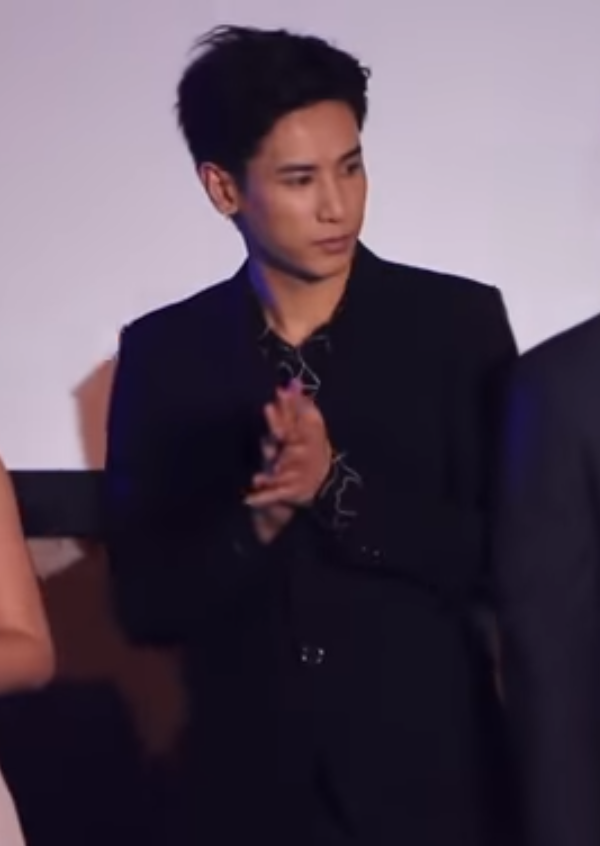
- Korn in March 2018
- Born: 13 November 1993 (age 32); Khon Kaen, Thailand
- Other name: Oaujun (อู๋จุน)
- Education: Srinakharinwirot University
- Occupations: Actor; dancer
- Years active: 2013–present
- Agent: GMMTV (2013–2018)
- Height: 5 ft 9 in (1.75 m)

Korn Khunatipapisiri (Thai: กร คุณาธิปอภิสิริ; born 13 November 1993), nicknamed Oaujun (Thai: อู๋จุน), is a Thai actor and dancer. He is best known for his roles in the film Love's Coming (2014) and television series Ugly Duckling Series: Boy's Paradise (2015).

== Early life and education ==
Korn was born in Khon Kaen, Thailand. He is the youngest son of three siblings. He is currently studying in Srinakharinwirot University.

== Career ==
=== Dancer ===
Korn is a famous dancer and a member of the Thai dancer group Station5. He performed in more than 100 stage concerts.

=== Acting career ===
Korn began his career in the entertainment industry as a model and actor before he signed up with GMMTV. He made his acting debut with the film Rose – Last love in 2013.

In 2014, he got the main role in the BL film Love's Coming, portraying the role of Zee. In 2015, he starred in a Thai romance series Ugly Duckling Series: Boy's Paradise, where he played the main role. The same year, he portrayed the role of Earth in the series Wifi Society: Gray Secret.

In 2016, he starred in supporting roles in the LGBT drama SOTUS where he played the role of Tew and in the romantic drama Lovey Dovey. In 2017, he starred a supporting in the television series Slam Dance: The Series.

In 2017, he continued playing the supporting role of Tew in the sequel to SOTUS, SOTUS S and in an episode of the spin-off Our Skyy.

== Filmography ==
=== Movie ===
Year	Film	Role	Notes
2013	Rose – Last love	Mai	
2014	Love's Coming	Zee	Main cast
2015	Love Love you	Zee	

=== Television series ===
Year	Title	Role	Notes
2015	Wifi Society: Gray Secret	Earth	Main role
2015	Ugly Duckling Series: Boy's Paradise	Rayji	Main role
2016	Lovey Dovey	young Kongfa	Support role
2016	SOTUS	Tew	Support role
2017	Slam Dance	Ken	Support role
2017	SOTUS S	Tew	Support role
2018	Happy Birthday	Top	Support role
2018	Our Skyy: Arthit-Kongpob	Tew	Guest role
