= Diana Flipo =

Thai actress, model and YouTuber

- Born: Diana Flipo; August 11, 1994 (age 32); Udon Thani Province, Thailand
- Other name: Diana
- Education: Kasetsart University
- Occupations: Actress; Model; YouTuber; Businesswoman
- Years active: 2013–present
- Agent: Channel 3 (2014–2022)
- Height: 1.70 m (5 ft 7 in)
- Parent: Suwimol Chaiyawong (Mother)
- Awards: Pikanesuan Award; 2015 – Outstanding Rising Actress (Tarm Rak Keun Jai)
- Years active: 2012–present

Diana Flipo (Thai: เดียร์น่า ฟลีโป; born 11 August 1994) is a Thai-French actress and model. Formerly signed with Channel 3, she is currently a freelance actress and entrepreneur.

== Early life and education ==
Diana Flipo was born in Mueang Udon Thani district, Udon Thani Province, to a French father and a Thai mother, Suwimon Chaiyawong. On her maternal side, she descends from Chao Maha Khanan Chaiyawong, the 6th ruler of Lampang. Her family operates a Thai silk business, "Chanruen Nakha," based in the Na Kha Silk Market in Udon Thani. The brand's textiles have been featured in international fashion shows for luxury brands such as Lanvin and Giorgio Armani. She has a twin brother named Maxim Flipo. In addition to her career in the entertainment industry, Flipo manages her own business ventures. She frequently promotes Thai cultural identity by wearing traditional Thai textiles on various occasions, an interest influenced by her family's background in the textile industry since her childhood.

Flipo completed her primary and lower secondary education at Don Bosco Wittaya Udonthani School and attended high school at Udonpittayanukoon School. She graduated with a Bachelor of Arts (Thai Language) with second-class honors from the Faculty of Humanities Kasetsart University in 2017.

== Career ==
Flipo developed an interest in acting through school activities, such as serving as a drum major. At age 15, she won the Young Presenter contest in Udon Thani. During her final year of high school, she was scouted by talent manager Suppachai Srivijit at a restaurant, marking her entry into the entertainment industry.

Subsequently, Anne Thongprasom cast her in the 2014 drama Samee Tee Tra, marking her acting debut as 'Koy' on Channel 3. She gained further recognition for her role as 'Khun Nong' in Tarm Rak Keun Jai (2015) before landing her first lead role in Lueat Rak Thoranong. Since then, she has been consistently active in acting, modeling, and commercial work.
