= Jirakit Thawornwong =

Thai actor and singer (born 1994)

- จิรกิตติ์ ถาวรวงศ์
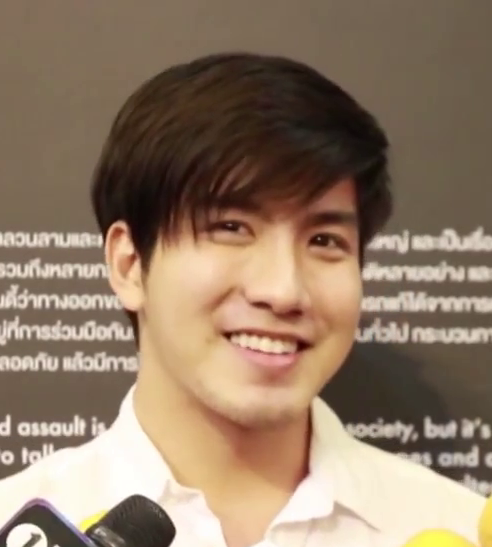
- Jirakit in July 2018
- Born: 28 August 1994 (age 32); Bangkok, Thailand
- Other name: เมฆ
- Education: Kasetsart University (BA)
- Occupations: Actor; singer
- Years active: 2014–present
- Known for: View in Room Alone 401-410; Hawk in U-Prince; Thada in Kiss: The Series
- Relatives: Worranit Thawornwong (sister)

Jirakit Thawornwong (Thai: จิรกิตติ์ ถาวรวงศ์; born 28 August 1994), nicknamed Mek (Thai: เมฆ), is a Thai actor and singer. He is known for his starring roles in Room Alone 401-410 (2014), Room Alone 2 (2015), Ugly Duckling Series: Don't (2015), and U-Prince (2016).

== Early life and education ==
Jirakit was born in Bangkok, Thailand. He completed his secondary education at Satriwithaya School. In 2017, he graduated with a bachelor's degree in communication arts from the Faculty of Humanities at Kasetsart University.

== Career ==
With a desire to become a singer, Jirakit participated in the 7th season of The Star, a reality television singing competition, representing Central Thailand but did not make it to the Top 24. He auditioned again for its 8th season, this time representing Southern Thailand, and still got eliminated. He was later offered and signed up by GMM Grammy as one of its artists. He started in the entertainment industry as a host of Bang Music Buffet in 2011 and was tapped to play the role of Pete in the movie Part Time Lover (2014).

He also played main and support roles in Ugly Duckling (2015), Kiss: The Series (2016), U-Prince (2016–2017), and Secret Seven (2017).

== Personal life ==
Jirakit is the older brother of actress and singer Worranit Thawornwong. His father died on 21 August 2019.

== Filmography ==
=== Film ===
Year	Title	Role	Notes	Ref.
2013	Part Time Lover	Pete		

=== Television ===
Year	Title	Role	Notes	Ref.
2014	Room Alone 401-410	View		
2015	Ugly Duckling: Don't	Zero		
2015	Room Alone 2	View		
2016	Kiss: The Series	Thada		
2016	U-Prince:The Handsome Cowboy	Hawk		
2016	U-Prince:The Foxy Pilot	Hawk		
2017	U-Prince: The Extroverted Humanist	Hawk		
2017	U-Prince: The Crazy Artist	Hawk		
2017	U-Prince: The Ambitious Boss	Hawk	Guest	
2017	Secret Seven	Id		
2017	Love Songs Love Series: Rueng Tee Koh	Sun		
2018	Wake Up Ladies: The Series	Pat	Guest	
2018	Kiss Me Again	Thada		
2018	The Gifted	Chanon		
2019	Koo Sah Kadeepuan	Chalee		
2019	The Sand Princess	Bom	Guest	
2019	Dark Blue Kiss	Thada		
2019	A Gift For Whom You Hate	Noom		
2020	Angel Beside Me	Luke		
2020	Girl Next Room: Richy Rich	Khunkhao		
2020	The Gifted: Graduation	Chanon		
2021	An Eye for an Eye	Kampanad Junlapakborirak (Kam)		
2021	Oh My Boss	Nat	Guest	
2021	The Player	Matt		
2022	Star in My Mind	Khuafah		
2022	Sky in Your Heart	Khuafah		
2022	Good Old Days: Story 5: Love Wins	F	Guest	
