= Leo Saussay =

Thai actor, host and singer (born 1990)

- เลโอ โซสเซย์
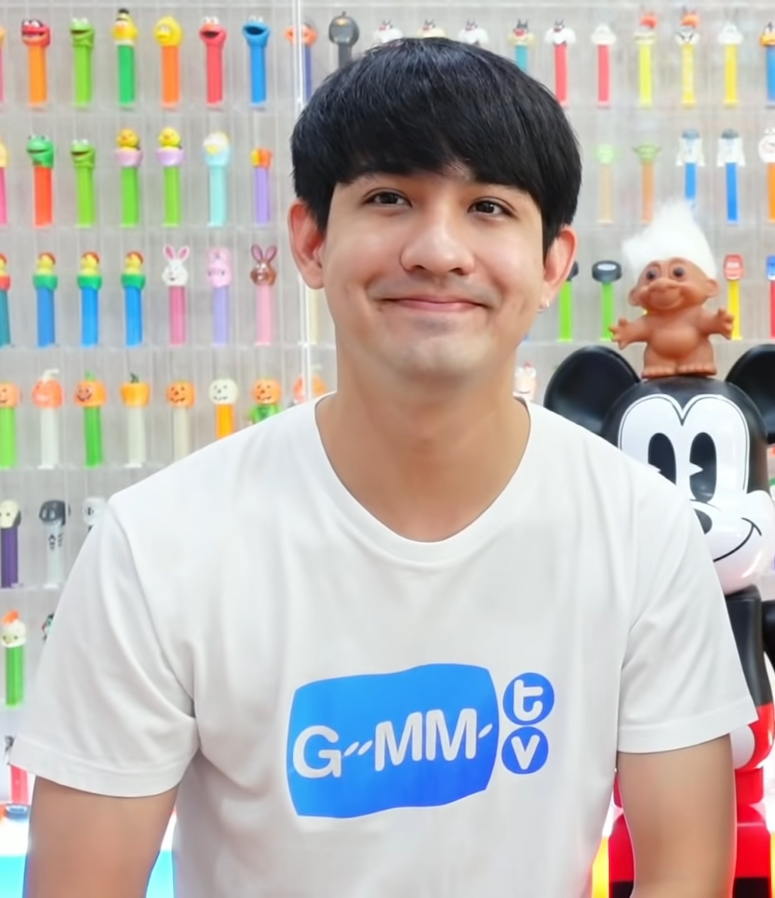
- Leo in July 2021
- Born: 15 January 1990 (age 36); Bangkok, Thailand
- Occupations: Singer; actor; YouTuber
- Years active: 2008–present
- Height: 1.79 m (5 ft 10 in)
- Partners: Chacha Arita Ramnarong

Leo Saussay (Thai: เลโอ โซสเซย์; born 15 January 1990), is a Thai-French actor, TV presenter and singer, who was a member of Thai pop band, B.O.Y.

== Early life and education ==
Saussay was born to a French father and a Thai mother. He graduated from Wat Nairong School and received a bachelor's degree of Arts in French from Ramkhamhaeng University.

== Discography ==
=== Studio albums ===
Album details	Track listing
Blood Of Youth: Year: 2008; Label: GMM Grammy; Formats: CD/DVD	1. First Love First Hurt (Feat.Chin); 2. Tha Hahk Mai Koey Jab (ถ้าหากไม่เคยเจ็บ); 3. Mai Yahk Hai Pieng Job (ไม่อยากให้เพลงจบ); 4. Tur Nah Ruk (เธอน่ารัก); 5. Kaw Kwarm (ข้อความ); 6. Pen Purn Mai wai (เป็นเพื่อนไม่ไหว); 7. Yah Mah Giang (อย่ามาแกล้ง); 8. Mot Kum Taan (หมดคำถาม); 9. Ban Ya Gard Dee Dee (บรรยากาศดีดี)
Year: 2009; Label: GMM Grammy	1. Crazy for U
Because of You: Year: 2010; Label: GMM Grammy; Formats: CD/DVD	1. Because of You; 2. Arai Gaw Doi Nai Nai Joi Tur (อะไรก็ได้ในใจเธอ); 3. Keun Diow Gun (คืนเดียวกัน); 4. Tot Tan Tum Nah Ruk Sai (โทษฐานทำน่ารักใส่); 5. Ngow Juny Lerei (เหงาจังเลย); 6. Darling; 7. เช็คเธอ...Delivery

== Filmography ==
=== Soap opera ===
Year	Name	Channel	Role	Note
2018	Chuamong Tong Mon	Channel 3	Justin	

=== Sitcom ===
Year	Name	Channel	Role	Note
2009	Talok Hok Chak	Channel 5	Leo B.O.Y.	
2013	Krob Krua Kum	Channel 3	Leo	Cameo

=== Film ===
Year	Name	Role	Note
2012	Spicy Beauty Queen of Bangkok 2	Mon	
2013	Love Syndrome	Fong	

=== Series ===
Year	Name	Role	Note
2013	Love Chemistry	Em	
2013	Love Chemistry	Tar	Stuck on You
2015	Wifi Society	Arm	Another Chance
2015	Ugly Duckling	Max	Perfect Match
2016	Senior Secret Love	Rose	Bake Me Love
2016	Little Big Dream		
2017	30 The Series	Sero	
2018	Happy Birthday	Leo	
2019	Love Beyond Frontier	Poo	
2020	Turn Left Turn Right	Patrick	Cameo
2022	Astrophile	Kit	
2022	Good Old Days: Story 5: Love Wins	Chai-Anant	

=== YouTube ===
Year	Thai title	Title	Network	Notes	With
2019–present			CHACHALEO		อริต์ตา รามณรงค์

=== Magazines ===
- CENTERPOINT vol. 1 no. 18 July 2008
- KAZZ vol. 3 no. 27 July 2008
- KAZZ vol. 4 no. 41 September 2009
- KAZZ MINI vol. 2 no. 13 September 2009
- ILIKE vol. 8 no. 170 December 2009

=== Business ===
- Sugar Moustache
- Chalé
