= Thipakorn Thitathan =

Thai actor (born 2002)

- ฐิภากร ฐิตะฐาน
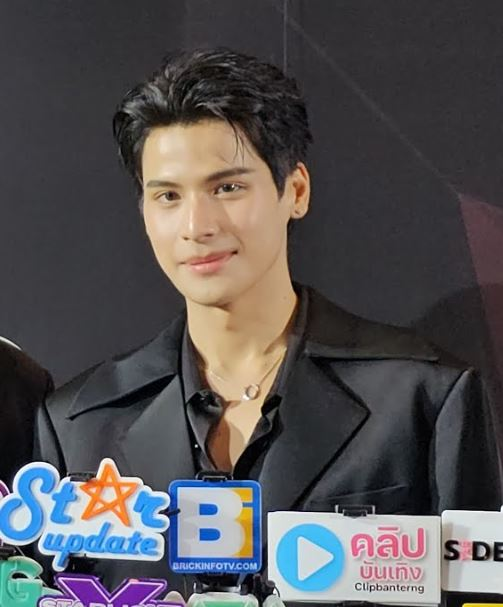
- Thipakorn in May 2025
- Born: 21 March 2002 (age 24); Thailand
- Other name: Ohm (โอม)
- Education: Triam Udom Suksa School
- Alma mater: Chulalongkorn University
- Occupation: Actor
- Years active: 2023–present
- Agent: GMMTV
- Known for: August in Last Twilight; Sant in Sweet Tooth, Good Dentist; Jay in Dare You to Death
- Height: 176 cm (5 ft 9 in)

Thipakorn Thitathan (Thai: ฐิภากร ฐิตะฐาน; born 2002), nicknamed Ohm (Thai: โอม), is a Thai actor signed under GMMTV known for his roles in Last Twilight (2023), Sweet Tooth, Good Dentist (2025), and Dare You to Death (2025).

== Early life and education ==
Thipakorn was born on 21 March 2002 in Thailand. He graduated from Chulalongkorn University's International Program in Design and Architecture in September 2024 with Second Class Honors.

== Career ==
Thipakorn entered the acting industry with a supporting role in the 2023 television series A Boss and a Babe, reprising his role in the "GunCher" segment of Our Skyy 2 later that same year. Thipakorn gained two more supporting role credits with Last Twilight (2023) and Kidnap (2024). Thipakorn then starred in the lead role as Sant in the romantic-comedy Sweet Tooth, Good Dentist (2025) alongside Pakin Kunaanuwit (Mark), as well as starring in Dare You to Death (2025). He is set to star in a main role the upcoming television series Roommate Chaos alongside Pakin, as well as a supporting role in the upcoming television series Round One.

== Filmography ==
=== Television series ===
Key
| † | Denotes television productions that have not yet been released |

| Year | Title | Role | Network | Notes | Ref. |
|---|---|---|---|---|---|
| 2023 | A Boss and a Babe | Zo | GMM 25 | Supporting role | |
| 2023 | Our Skyy 2: GunCher | Zo | GMM 25 | Supporting role | |
| 2023 | Last Twilight | "August" Annop Thammaisong | GMM 25 | Supporting role | |
| 2024 | Kidnap | "Men" Athiphat Monkolsit | GMM 25 | Supporting role | |
| 2025 | Sweet Tooth, Good Dentist | "Croissant" Sant | GMM 25 | Main role | |
| 2025 | Dare You to Death | "Jay" Jirawit Chotisuntrakul | GMM 25 | Supporting role | |
| 2026 | Only Friends: Dream On | Win | One 31 | Guest role | |
| 2026 | A Dog and a Plane | Por | One 31 | Guest role | |
| TBA | Roommate Chaos † | Thia | TBA | Main role | |
| TBA | Round One † | North | TBA | Supporting role | |
| TBA | The Spooky Love Tale † | Chan | TBA | Main role | |

== Discography ==
=== Singles ===
==== Soundtrack appearances ====
| Year | Title | Soundtrack | Label | Ref. |
|---|---|---|---|---|
| 2025 | "ยาวิเศษ (Magic Potion)"; With Mark Pakin | Sweet Tooth, Good Dentist OST | GMMTV Records | |
| 2025 | "ยิ้มได้เพราะเธอ (Make Me Smile)" | Sweet Tooth, Good Dentist OST | GMMTV Records | |

== Fanmeetings ==
| Title | Date | Venue | Notes | Ref. |
|---|---|---|---|---|
| A Boss and a Babe: Final EP. FanMeeting | May 19, 2023 | Siam Pavalai Theatre, Paragon Cineplex | With A Boss and a Babe cast | |
| Last Twilight Final EP. Fan Meeting | January 26, 2024 | Siam Pavalai Theatre, Paragon Cineplex | With Last Twilight cast | |
| Last Twilight New Dawn Live On Stage | March 30, 2024 | Union Hall, Union Mall | With Last Twilight cast | |
| Last Twilight FanMeeting in Hong Kong | July 6, 2024 | AXA Dreamland | With Jimmy, Sea | |
| Kidnap Final EP. FanMeeting | November 22, 2024 | SF World Cinema, CentralWorld | With Kidnap cast | |
| Sweet Tooth, Good Dentist Final EP. FanMeeting | June 6, 2025 | SF World Cinema, CentralWorld | With Sweet Tooth, Good Dentist cast | |
| Naiin Book Fair 2026 | January 24, 2026 | Samyan Mitrtown, 5th Fl. | With Mark | |
| Dare You to Death Final EP FanMeeting | February 26, 2026 | Centralworld Pulse Hall, 7th Fl. CentralWorld | With Dare You to Death cast | |
| GMMTV Fanival 2026 | April 2, 2026 | CentralWorld Pulse, 7th Fl. | With Mark | |
| GMMTV International Novel Festival 2026 | July 27, 2026 | Samyan Mitrtown, 5th Fl. | With Roommate Chaos cast | |
| GMMTV International Novel Festival 2026 | July 27, 2026 | Samyan Mitrtown, 5th Fl. | With Mark | |
| GMMTV Fanival: Happy Family | October 1, 2026 | Union Hall, Union Mall | With Mark | |
