= Pakin Kunaanuwit =

Thai actor and former badminton player (born 1998)

- ภาคิน คุณาอนุวิทย์
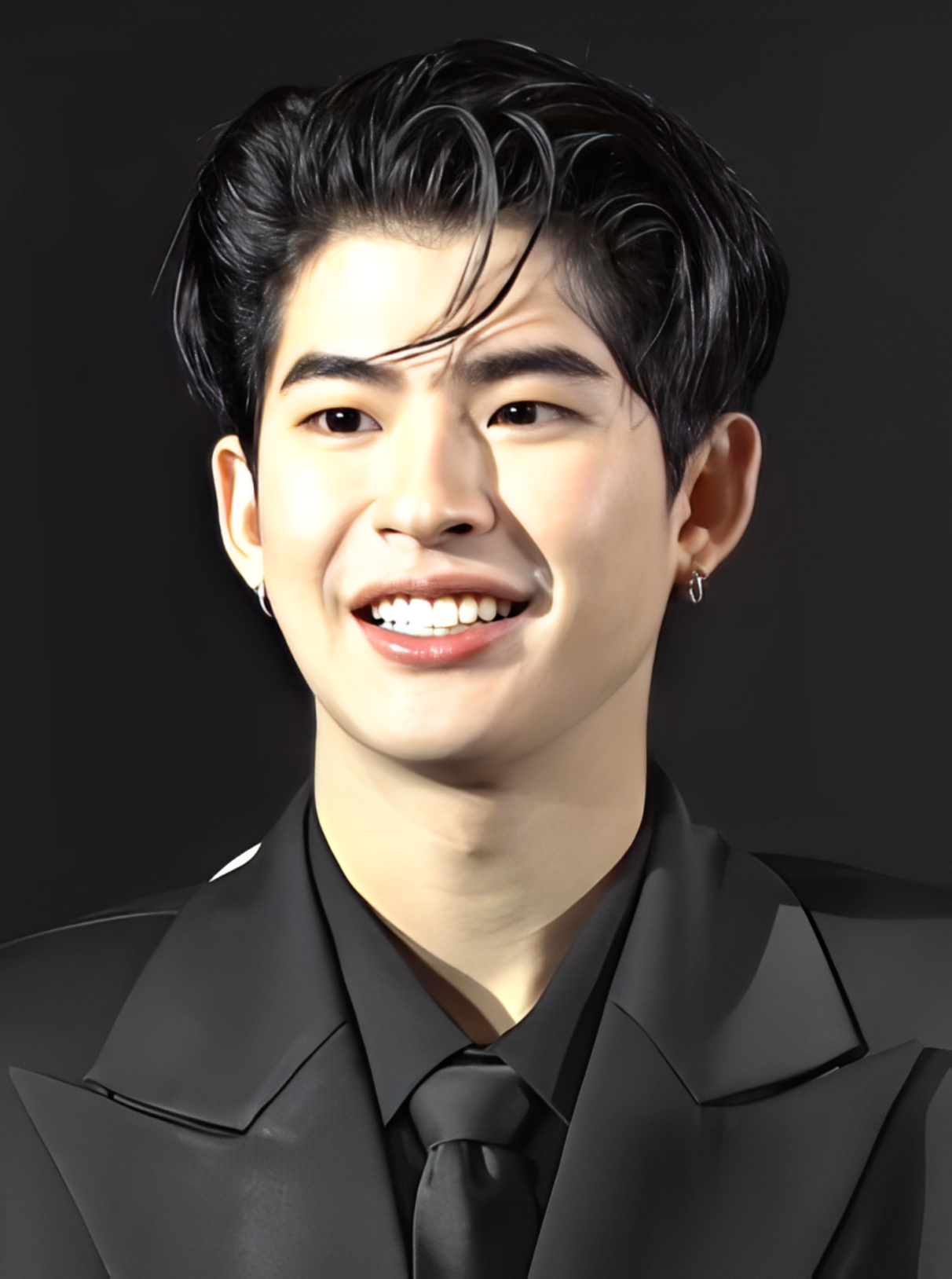
- Pakin in May 2025
- Born: 2 June 1998 (age 28); Bangkok, Thailand
- Other name: Mark Pakin
- Education: Bangkokthonburi University
- Occupation: Actor
- Years active: 2021–present
- Agent: GMMTV
- Known for: Tiwson in My School President; Nick in Only Friends; Night in Last Twilight
- Sports career
- Height: 1.79 m (5 ft 10 1/2 in)
- Sport: Badminton
- Events: Men's & mixed doubles

Sports achievements and titles
- Highest world ranking: 59 (MD 8 March 2018); 87 (XD 8 November 2018)
Medal record
Men's badminton
Representing Thailand
World Junior Championships
Bronze medal – third place	2016 Bilbao	Boys' doubles
Bronze medal – third place	2016 Bilbao	Mixed team
Asian Junior Championships
Bronze medal – third place	2016 Bangkok	Mixed team

Pakin Kunaanuwit (Thai: ภาคิน คุณาอนุวิทย์; born 2 June 1998), nicknamed Mark (Thai: มาร์ค), is a Thai actor signed under GMMTV and a former badminton player. As an actor, he is best known for his roles in My School President (2022), Only Friends (2023), and Last Twilight (2023).

== Early life and education ==
Pakin was born on 2 June 1998, in Bangkok, Thailand. He completed his secondary education at Wat Suthiwararam School in Bangkok. He has a bachelor's degree in political science from Bangkokthonburi University. He received his master's degree in Public Administration from the Faculty of Political Science at Bangkokthonburi University.

== Career ==
=== 2021–2024: My School President, Only Friends, Last Twilight ===
Mark first appeared in minor supporting roles, such as in I Promised You The Moon (2021) and Bad Buddy (2021).

Mark gained attention for his role as Tiwson in My School President (2022). He reprised his role as Tiwson in the anthology series Our Skyy 2. He went on to star in other popular series such as Moonlight Chicken (2023), Only Friends (2023), Last Twilight (2023), and High School Frenemy (2024).

In 2024, Mark won Best Supporting Actor at the Y Universe Awards 2024 for his role as Night in Last Twilight (2023).

=== 2025–present: Sweet Tooth, Good Dentist ===
Mark starred in the lead role as Jay, alongside Ohm Thipakorn Thitathan, in the romantic-comedy Sweet Tooth, Good Dentist (2025).

== Filmography ==
=== Film ===
Year	Title	Role	Notes	Ref.
2026	Inherit	Rangsan	Supporting role	

=== Television series ===
Key
†	Denotes television productions that have not yet been released

Year	Title	Role	Network	Notes	Ref.
2021	I Promised You the Moon	Mek	Line TV	Guest role (Ep. 1, 4)	
2021	Bad Buddy	Chang (Pat's friend)	GMM 25	Supporting role	
2022	My School President	Tiwson Sophonpatima	GMM 25	Supporting role	
2022	The Warp Effect	Jedi	GMM 25	Supporting role	
2023	Moonlight Chicken	Saleng	GMM 25	Supporting role	
2023	Our Skyy 2	Tiwson Sophonpatima / Chang	GMM 25	Supporting role	
2023	Only Friends	Nick	GMM 25	Main role	
2023	Last Twilight	Night	GMM 25	Supporting role	
2024	High School Frenemy	Chadjen	GMM 25	Supporting role	
2025	Sweet Tooth, Good Dentist	Jay	GMM 25	Main role	
2025	MuTeLuv: Fist Foot Fusion	Sunrise	GMM 25	Supporting role	
2026	Only Friends: Dream On	Nick	One 31	Guest role (Ep. 10)	
TBA	Roommate Chaos †	"Pao" Kiattipoom	TBA	Main role	
TBA	The Spooky Love Tale †	Min	TBA	Main role	
TBA	Round One †	Mile	TBA	Supporting role	
TBA	High & Low: Born to Be High †	Pae	TBA	TBA	
TBA	Itaewon Class: Thai Edition †	TBA	TBA	TBA	

=== Television show ===
Year	Title	Network	Notes
2021	Arm Share	GMMTV	Ep. 83
2023	School Rangers	GMM 25	Ep. 255–257, 284, 294–295
2023	EMS Earth-Mix Space SS2	GMMTV	Ep. 4
2023	Arm Share	GMMTV	Ep. 122, 132, 136–142
2023	OffGun Fun Night Special	GMMTV	Ep. 10–11
2023	Laneige Let It Glow ซีนป่วนก๊วนผิวปัง	Laneige Thailand	
2023	1 Day with เลย์ไลท์	GMMTV	
2023	A Free Meal Chance – May Pepsi Treat You?	GMMTV	Ep. 1
2023	Laneige Let It Go ทริปป่วน ก๊วนผิวปัง	GMMTV	
2023	Talk with Toeys	GMM 25	Ep. 134
2023	Save 100K – แสบ SAVE แสน	GMMTV	
2024	School Rangers	GMM 25	
2024	Laneige Let It Glow ซีนป่วนก๊วนผิวปัง SS2	Laneige Thailand	
2024	Tred Tray Fest with Tay Tawan Special	GMMTV	Ep. 5–6
2024	Pepsi Friend Feast Guide with Gemini-Fourth	GMMTV	Ep. 2, 10, 19
2024	High Season แคมป์ซ่าฮาทุกฤดู	GMMTV	Ep. 2–3
2024	Arm Share	GMMTV	Ep. 152, 155–156, 164, 169
2024	Brand's Brain Camp	GMMTV	
2024	Laneige Let It Go ทริปป่วน ก๊วนผิวปัง Season 2	GMMTV	
2024	High Season แคมป์ซ่าฮาทุกฤดู Season 2 Rainy	One 31, GMMTV	Ep. 1–2
2024	Laneige Let It Glow ซีนป่วนก๊วนผิวปัง Season 3	Laneige Thailand	
2024	หัวท้ายตายก่อน The First and Last Thailand	Workpoint TV	Ep. 143
2024	แฉ Chae	GMM 25	28 October 2024
2024	LittleBigWorld with Pond Phuwin	GMMTV	Ep. 14
2024	4 ต่อ 4 Celebrity	One 31	Ep. 922
2024	มนุษย์ป้าล่าเด็ก Special	GMMTV	6 December 2024
2025	ล้น Feed	One 31	
2025	High Season แคมป์ซ่าฮาทุกฤดู Season 3 Winter	One 31, GMMTV	Ep. 4–8
2025	The Unexpected Trip ไปไม่หวัง ปังไม่ไหว by Nivea	GMMTV	
2025	FriendEd 101	GMMTV	
2025	Tred Tray Fest with Tay Tawan	GMMTV	Special Ep. 7
2025	Arm Share	GMMTV	Ep. 178, 180, 187, 193–194
2025	แก้เกมโกง Fraud Fighters	GMM 25	Ep. 2
2025	Garnier วิทย์ตี้ Academy	GMMTV	Ep. 1
2025	จตุรMeet ยกหยุดโลก	GMMTV	Ep. 4
2025	Pepsi Friend Feast Guide with Gemini-Fourth Season 2	GMMTV	Ep. 7
2025	แสบ Save แสน Season 2	GMMTV	Ep. 3
2025	Goodbye ตายไม่รู้ตัว	Workpoint TV	Ep. 42 (20 October 2025)
2025	รู้ไหมใครโสด Do You Know Who's Single	Workpoint TV	Ep. 38
2025	Face Off	Workpoint TV	9 December 2025
2025	The Wall Song	Workpoint TV	Ep. 276
2026	ทศกัณฐ์ รันวงการ Tossakan Runs the Industry	Workpoint TV	Ep. 1–2
2026	Bestie Tasty Season 3	GMMTV	Ep. 2
2026	Pepsi Friend Feast Guide with Gemini-Fourth Season 2	GMMTV	Ep. 12
2026	Face Off	Workpoint TV	3 February 2026

=== Music video appearances ===
Year	Title	Artist	Ref.
2024	"ใช้ฉันทำไม (Stand-in)"	Proo Thunwa	
2026	"Bloom"	fellow fellow feat. Aheye	

== Discography ==
=== Singles ===
==== Soundtrack appearances ====
Year	Title	Album
2023	"ง้อว (Smile Please)" (with Fourth, Gemini, Ford, Satang, Winny, Captain, Prom)	My School President OST
2023	"รักคู่ขนาน (Multi-Love)" (with Gemini, Fourth, Winny, Satang, Ford)	Our Skyy 2 OST
2025	"ยาวิเศษ (Magic Potion)" (with Ohm Thipakorn)	Sweet Tooth, Good Dentist OST
2025	"Mr.Romantic"	Sweet Tooth, Good Dentist OST

== Achievements ==
=== BWF World Junior Championships ===
Boys' doubles

Year	Venue	Partner	Opponent	Score	Result
2016	Bilbao Arena, Bilbao, Spain	(Thailand) Natthapat Trinkajee	(China) Han Chengkai (China) Zhou Haodong	15–21, 12–21	Bronze

=== BWF International Challenge/Series ===
Men's doubles

Year	Tournament	Partner	Opponent	Score	Result
2016	Bulgaria International	(Thailand) Natthapat Trinkajee	(Bulgaria) Philip Shishov (Bulgaria) Alex Vlaar	21–19, 21–19	(gold) Winner
2018	Slovak Open	(Thailand) Natthapat Trinkajee	(Chinese Taipei) Lu Chen (Chinese Taipei) Ye Hong-wei	18–21, 20–22	(silver) Runner-up

Mixed doubles

Year	Tournament	Partner	Opponent	Score	Result
2018	Slovak Open	(Thailand) Supissara Paewsampran	(Chinese Taipei) Ye Hong-wei (Chinese Taipei) Teng Chun-hsun	16–21, 16–21	(silver) Runner-up

BWF International Challenge tournament
BWF International Series tournament
BWF Future Series tournament

== Fanmeetings ==
Title	Date	Venue	Notes	Ref.
Moonlight Chicken: Opening Night	8 February 2023	Ballroom Hall 1–2, Queen Sirikit National Convention Center	With Moonlight Chicken cast	
Moonlight Chicken Final Ep. Fan Meeting	2 March 2023	True Icon Hall, Iconsiam	With Moonlight Chicken cast	
My School President: Prom Night Live on Stage	18–19 March 2023	Union Hall, Union Mall	With My School President cast	
GMMTV FanDay 4 in Osaka	7 May 2023	Dojima River Forum	With My School President cast	
My School President Fan Meeting in Cambodia	27–28 May 2023	Aeon Hall	With My School President cast	
My School President Fan Meeting in Taipei	8 July 2023	Zepp New Taipei	With My School President cast	
My School President Fan Meeting in Singapore	1 July 2023	Capitol Theatre	With My School President cast	
Mark-Ford 'School Break' Fan Meeting in Vietnam	15 July 2023	Army Theatre	With Ford	
My School President Fan Meeting in Manila	5 August 2023	University Theater of UP Diliman	With My School President cast	
My School President Fan Meeting in Hong Kong	12 August 2023	AsiaWorld-Summit, AsiaWorld-Expo	With My School President cast	
Only Friends: Final Ep. Fan Meeting	28 October 2023	Siam Pavalai Theatre, Paragon Cineplex	With Only Friends cast	
My School President Fan Meeting in Vietnam	12 November 2023	Hoa Binh Theater	With My School President cast	
My School President Fan Meeting in Tokyo	23 November 2023	Belle Salle Shinjuku Grand Hall	With My School President cast	
My School President Fan Meeting in Seoul	25 November 2023	Woonjung Green Campus Grand Hall, Sungshin Women's University	With My School President cast	
My School President Fan Meeting in Macau	3 December 2023	H853 Fun Factory	With My School President cast	
Only Friends Fan Meeting in Japan	9 December 2023	Saitama Hall	With Only Friends cast	
Last Twilight Final Ep. Fan Meeting	26 January 2024	Siam Pavalai Royal Grand Theater, Siam Paragon	With Last Twilight cast	
Last Twilight: New Dawn Live On Stage	30 March 2024	Union Hall, Union Mall	With Last Twilight cast	
Only Friends Fan Meeting in Taipei	7 April 2024	NTU Sports Center	With Only Friends cast	
Only Friends Fan Meeting in Hong Kong	15 June 2024	AXA Dreamland	With Only Friends cast	
Only Friends Fan Meeting in Vietnam	6 July 2024	Hoa Binh Theater	With Only Friends cast	
Only Friends Fan Meeting in Manila	24 August 2024	New Frontier Theater	With Only Friends cast	
Sweet Tooth, Good Dentist Final Ep. Fan Meeting	6 June 2025	SF World Cinema, CentralWorld	With Sweet Tooth, Good Dentist cast	
Naiin Book Fair 2026	24 January 2026	Samyan Mitrtown, 5th Fl.	With Ohm	
GMMTV Fanival 2026	2 April 2026	CentralWorld Pulse, 7th Fl.	With Ohm	
GMMTV International Novel Festival 2026	27 July 2026	Samyan Mitrtown, 5th Fl.	With Roommate Chaos cast	
GMMTV International Novel Festival 2026	27 July 2026	Samyan Mitrtown, 5th Fl.	With Ohm	
GMMTV Fanival: Happy Family	1 October 2026	Union Hall, Union Mall	With Ohm	

== Awards and nominations ==
Award nominations for Pakin Kunaanuwit
Year	Award	Category	Nominee(s)	Result	Ref.
2024	20th Kom Chad Luek Awards	Best Supporting Actor	Moonlight Chicken	Nominated	
2024	Best Artist Award 2024	Rising Male Star of the Year		Won	
2024	29th Asian Television Awards	Best Actor in a Supporting Role	Last Twilight	Nominated	
2024	Y Universe Awards 2024	Best Supporting Actor	Last Twilight	Won	
