= Way-Ar Sangngern =

Thai actor, model and host (born 1996)

- เวอาห์ แสงเงิน
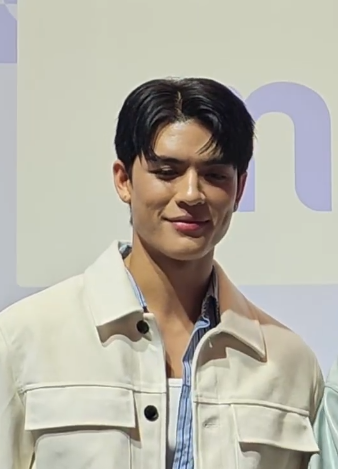
- Way-Ar in February 2026
- Born: 8 March 1996 (age 30); Thung Song, Nakhon Si Thammarat, Thailand
- Other name: Joss (จอส)
- Education: Sarasas Witaed Saimai School
- Alma mater: Communication Arts Chulalongkorn University
- Occupation: Actor
- Years active: 2019–present
- Agent: Domundi TV (2016–2018) GMMTV (2019–present)
- Known for: Neo in 3 Will Be Free; Mark in My Golden Blood; Arnold in Only Friends: Dream On
- Height: 1.9 m (6 ft 3 in)
- Website: GMMTV Artist

Way-Ar Sangngern (Thai: เวอาห์ แสงเงิน, RTGS: We-a Saeng-ngoen; born 8 March 1996), nicknamed Joss (Thai: จอส), is a Thai actor. He is known for his main role as Neo in GMMTV's 3 Will Be Free (2019), Kawin in Nabi, My Stepdarling (2021), Mark in My Golden Blood (2025), and Arnold in Only Friends: Dream On (2026).

In addition to his acting career, Way-ar has established himself in the sporting industry, competing in real-life boxing matches, most notably winning the celebrity boxing show 10 Fight 10 in 2022, competing in both seasons of the celebrity basketball show 3Fight3 Basket Boy, and becoming the brand ambassador for Under Armour Thailand in 2025.

== Early life and education ==
Way-ar was born in Thung Song District, Nakhon Si Thammarat Province, Thailand. At age 12, he attended Sarasas Witaed Saimai School and attended Traill International School at age 15. He graduated with a bachelor's degree from the Faculty of Communication Arts at Chulalongkorn University.

== Career ==
In 2016, Way-ar was a first generation member of the television production company and talent agency Domundi TV as a content creator alongside Zee Pruk. Leaving in 2018, he was cast in his breakthrough role in the 2019 television series 3 Will Be Free before becoming a regular mainstay in GMMTV’s lakorns and dramas.

His breakthrough role within the boy's love industry came in 2025 when he was partnered with Gawin Caskey for the award-winning television series My Golden Blood. In 2025, Way-ar and Gawin hosted their JossGawin Invincible Fancon concert, performing various songs from their discographies. He was again partnered with Gawin in the 2026 television series Only Friends: Dream On and is set to co-star in the upcoming Thai television series Round One after the previous project they signed to was cancelled.

== Filmography ==
=== Television series ===
Key
| † | Denotes television productions that have not yet been released |

| Year | Title | Role | Notes | Ref. |
|---|---|---|---|---|
| 2018 | Friend Zone | Safe | Guest role | |
| 2019 | Wolf | Bartender | Guest role | |
| 2019 | 3 Will Be Free | Neo | Main role | |
| 2019 | Game Rak Ao Keun | Pongkul | Main role | |
| 2020 | Fai Sin Chua | "Ake" Aekaong | Main role | |
| 2020 | Friend Zone 2: Dangerous Area | Safe | Main role | |
| 2021 | Nabi, My Stepdarling | Kawin / Win | Main role | |
| 2021 | The Player | "Tim" Theerapat Theerachaichan | Main role | |
| 2022 | Oh, Teacher Khong | Chalam | Guest role | |
| 2022 | Mama Gogo | Kayu | Support role | |
| 2022 | Good Old Days: Story 3 - Road to Regret | Bomb | Main role | |
| 2023 | Midnight Museum | Zen | Guest role | |
| 2023 | Loneliness Society | Thann Saengsawang | Main role | |
| 2025 | My Golden Blood | Mark Amarittrakul / Mark Jensen | Main role | |
| 2025 | Revamp The Undead Story | Mark Amarittrakul / Mark Jensen | Guest role | |
| 2026 | Only Friends: Dream On | Arnold | Main Role | |
| TBA | Round One † | Zack | Main Role | |
| TBA | High & Low: Born to Be High † | TBA | Main Role | |

=== Music video appearances ===
| Year | Title | Artist | Label | Ref. |
|---|---|---|---|---|
| 2019 | "ฝากเวลา"; 3 Will Be Free OST | The White Hair Cut | GMMTV Records | |
| 2021 | "เศษ (Dust)"; Nabi, My Stepdarling OST | Gawin Caskey | GMMTV Records | |
| 2025 | "Closer"; My Golden Blood OST | Gawin Caskey | GMMTV Records | |
| 2025 | "Magic Car" | PiXXiE | LIT Entertainment | |
| 2026 | "ห้ามแต (No One Can)"; Only Friends: Dream On OST | Gawin Caskey | GMMTV Records | |
| 2026 | "ไม่ยอม (All In)"; Only Friends: Dream On OST | Mix Sahaphap | GMMTV Records | |

== Discography ==
=== Singles ===
==== Collaborations ====
| Year | Title | Label | Ref. |
|---|---|---|---|
| 2025 | "ที่เธอ (You're My Way)" with Gawin | GMMTV Records | |
| 2026 | "Love Feels So Fast" with Gawin, Earth, Mix, Boun, Prem, Pond, Phuwin, Force, Book, Joong, Dunk, Jimmy, Sea, First, Khaotung, Gemini, Fourth, Perth, Santa, William, Est, Junior, Mark | GMMTV Records | |

==== Soundtrack appearances ====
| Year | Title | Series | Label | Ref. |
|---|---|---|---|---|
| 2025 | "Just You" | My Golden Blood | GMMTV Records | |
| 2025 | "Ever After" with Gawin Caskey | My Golden Blood | GMMTV Records | |
| 2026 | "Like The Tide" with Gawin Caskey | Only Friends: Dream On | GMMTV Records | |
| 2026 | "เอาเลยมั้ย (Let’s Try)" Dream On Ver. with Gawin, Earth, Mix, Aou, Boom | Only Friends: Dream On | GMMTV Records | |

==== Album appearances ====
| Year | Album | Song title | Original soundtrack | Label | Ref. |
|---|---|---|---|---|---|
| 2021 | Boys Don't Cry | "เหงาเป็น (Lonely Mode)" | —N/a | GMMTV Records | |
| 2026 | Best of GMMTV Vol. 2 | "Ever After" with Gawin Caskey | My Golden Blood | GMMTV Records | |

== Concerts ==
| Year | Title | Date(s) | Venue | Artist(s) | Ref. |
|---|---|---|---|---|---|
| 2024 | GMMTV Starlympics 2024 | December 21, 2024 | Impact Arena | GMMTV Artists | |
| 2025 | JossGawin Invincible Fancon | September 27, 2025 | The Mall Lifestore Bangkapi | With Gawin, Poon, Barcode, Neo, Mond, Ryu, Satang, Ford | |
| 2025 | GMMTV Starlympics 2025 | December 20, 2025 | Impact Arena | GMMTV Artists | |
| 2026 | ForceBook Funtopia Fancon | April 4, 2026 | Union Hall | With Force, Book, Gawin, Jimmy, Junior | |
| 2026 | LOL Fan Fest 2026: Heart Race | May 22–24, 2026 | Impact Arena | With Gawin, Earth, Mix, Boun, Prem, Pond, Phuwin, Force, Book, Joong, Dunk, Jimmy, Sea, First, Khaotung, Gemini, Fourth, Perth, Santa, William, Est, Junior, Mark | |
| 2026 | JossGawin Heat & Beat Concert | July 28, 2026 | Union Hall | With Gawin, Krist, Singto, Lego, FLIO | |
| 2026 | GMMTV Starlympics 2026 | November 28, 2026 | Impact Arena | GMMTV Artists | |
| 2027 | JossGawin Heat & Beat Fancon in Singapore | February 19, 2027 | Capitol Theatre, Singapore | With Gawin | |

Upcoming

== Awards and nominations ==
| Year | Award Ceremony | Category | Nominated work | Result | Ref. |
|---|---|---|---|---|---|
| 2017 | Cleo Magazine | "Love at First Sight" Prize | Domundi TV YouTube channel | Won | |
| 2020 | Line TV Awards | Best Kiss Scene | 3 Will Be Free with Tay Tawan and Mild Lapassalan | Nominated | |
| 2023 | Asian Academy Creative Awards 2023 | Best Drama Series | with the cast of Good Old Days | Won | |
| 2025 | Y Entertain Awards | Rising Star Couple with Gawin Caskey | —N/a | Nominated | |
| 2025 | Maya Awards | Original SoundTracks of the year | "Ever After" with Gawin Caskey from the My Golden Blood soundtrack | Won | |
| 2025 | Maya Awards | Male Couple of the Year Award with Gawin Caskey | —N/a | Nominated | |
| 2026 | KBops Global Awards | King of Boys' Love with Gawin Caskey | —N/a | Won | |

== Fan meetings and tours ==
=== Fan meetings ===
| Name | Date | Venue | Notes | Ref. |
|---|---|---|---|---|
| My Golden Blood Final EP. Fan Meeting | May 28, 2025 | Siam Pavalai Theatre, Paragon Complex, BANGKOK | With My Golden Blood Cast | |
| GMMTV Fan Day 21 in Vietnam | June 21, 2025 | Army Theatre, HO CHI MINH CITY | With Gawin | |
| JossGawin Fan Meeting in Taipei | July 13, 2025 | Zepp New Taipei, Honhui Plaza, TAIPEI | With Gawin | |
| GMMTV Fan Day 22 in Osaka | July 20, 2025 | Cool Japan Park, Osaka WW Hall, OSAKA | With Gawin | |
| GMMTV Fan Day 23 in Manila | August 24, 2025 | Samsung Hall, SM Aura Premier, MANILA | With Gawin | |
| JossGawin Fan Meeting in Macau | November 10, 2025 | The Parisian Theatre, The Parisian, MACAU | With Gawin | |
| Naiin Book Fair 2026 | January 26, 2026 | Samyan Mitrtown, 5th Fl. | With Gawin | |
| Only Friends: Dream On - The Play Begins | February 27, 2025 | 7th fl. Centralworld Pulse Hall, BANGKOK | With Only Friends: Dream On Cast | |
| GMMTV Fan Day 30 in Tokyo | March 22, 2026 | Nissho Hall, TOKYO | With Gawin | |
| GMMTV Fanival 2026 | March 31, 2026 | CentralWorld Pulse, 7th Fl. | With Gawin | |
| Into the Night, Closer to You: Joss Fan Sign in Shenzhen | April 11, 2026 | SHENZHEN | —N/a | |
| Only Friends: Dream On - Final EP. Fan Meeting | May 15, 2026 | 3rd fl. MCC Hall, The Mall Lifestore Bangkapi, BANGKOK | With Only Friends: Dream On Cast | |
| JossGawin Fan Meeting in Washington D.C. | September 6, 2026 | The Howard Theatre, WASHINGTON D.C. | With Gawin | |
| GMMTV Fanival: Happy Family | October 3, 2026 | Union Hall, Union Mall, BANGKOK | With Gawin | |
| JossGawin Fan Meeting in Italy | January 16, 2027 | Milton Rome Airport Hotel, ROME | With Gawin | |
| GMMTV Fan Day 2027: Taipei | April 17-18, 2027 | Zepp New Taipei, Honhui Plaza, TAIPEI | With Gawin | |

Upcoming

=== Tours ===
| Tour | Name | Date | Venue | Notes | Ref. |
|---|---|---|---|---|---|
| European Tour | JossGawin Fan Meeting in Madrid | October 4, 2025 | Kinépolis Ciudad de la Imagen, MADRID | With Gawin | |
| European Tour | JossGawin Fan Meeting in London | October 6, 2025 | The Clapham Grand, LONDON | With Gawin | |
| European Tour | JossGawin Fan Meeting in Paris | October 8, 2025 | La Palmeraie, PARIS | With Gawin | |
| US & Latin America Tour | JossGawin Fan Meeting in Brazil | October 11, 2025 | Studio Stage, SÃO PAULO | With Gawin | |
| US & Latin America Tour | JossGawin Fan Meeting in Mexico | October 13, 2025 | Cuauhtémoc, MEXICO CITY | With Gawin | |
| US & Latin America Tour | JossGawin Fan Meeting in Atlanta | October 15, 2025 | Variety Playhouse, ATLANTA | With Gawin | |
| US & Latin America Tour | JossGawin Fan Meeting in Los Angeles | October 17, 2025 | The United Theatre on Broadway, LOS ANGELES | With Gawin | |
| Only Friends: Dream On Americas Tour | Only Friends: Dream On in Mexico City | September 9, 2026 | Expo Reforma, MEXICO CITY | With Only Friends: Dream On Cast | |
| Only Friends: Dream On Americas Tour | Only Friends: Dream On in Lima | September 12, 2026 | Parque de la Exposición, LIMA | With Only Friends: Dream On Cast | |
| Only Friends: Dream On Americas Tour | Only Friends: Dream On in Brazil | September 14, 2026 | Teatro Renault, SÃO PAULO | With Only Friends: Dream On Cast | |
