= Gawin Caskey =

Thai-American actor and singer (born 1997)

- กวิน แคสกี้
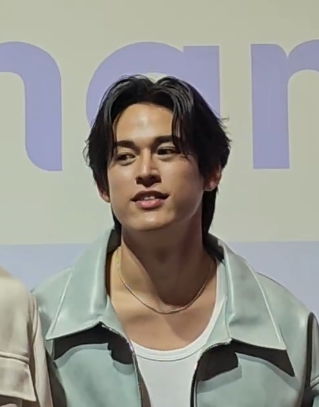
- Gawin in February 2026
- Born: 8 August 1997 (age 29); Bangkok, Thailand
- Other name: Fluke (ฟลุ๊ค)
- Education: Assumption University
- Occupations: Actor; Singer
- Years active: 2018–present
- Agent: GMMTV
- Known for: Mork in Dark Blue Kiss; Dan in Not Me; Pisaeng in Be My Favorite; Tong in My Golden Blood; Tua in Only Friends: Dream On
- Height: 1.86 m (6 ft 1 in)
- Musical career
- Genres: R&B; Thai Pop
- Instruments: Vocals; Guitar
- Years active: 2019–present
- Label: Riser Music (2026–present)
- Website: GMMTV Artist

Gawin Caskey (Thai: กวิน แคสกี้; born 8 August 1997), is a Thai-American singer and actor. He is known for his roles in Dark Blue Kiss (2019), Not Me (2021–2022), and My Golden Blood (2025), as well as singing career under GMMTV Records and Riser Music. He is also the owner of clothing brand Sløth.

== Early life and education ==
Gawin was born on 8 August 1997 in Bangkok, Thailand. He is of Thai-American descent and is fluent in both Thai and English. He completed his secondary education at the McDowell High School, United States. In January 2023, he completed his International Business Management Program, and graduated in Faculty of Business Administration and Economics from Assumption University (ABAC), Bangkok.

== Acting career and breakthrough ==
In 2018, Gawin entered the entertainment industry when he debuted as "Mork" in the series Kiss Me Again, under GMMTV production. His role was reprised in the sequel Dark Blue Kiss in 2019, which catapulted him to stardom.

From 2018 onwards, Gawin featured in few supporting roles within the industry, which includes role of "Mile" in Girl Next Room: Motorbike Baby, "Saifah" in Enchanté, and "D-day" in Oops! Mr. Superstar Hit on Me. His role as "Dan" in the successful series Not Me brought him to international prominence.

In 2023, Gawin bagged his first lead role as "Pisaeng" opposite Perawat Sangpotirat (Krist) in the series Be My Favorite, which is the adaptation of Jittirain's novel You Are My Favorite (บทกวีของปีแสง).

In 2025, Gawin formed an acting partnership with co-star Way-ar Sangngern (Joss) for the award-winning television series My Golden Blood. This partnership continued when the duo starred in the 2026 television series Only Friends: Dream On and are both set to star in the upcoming Thai television series Round One after the previous project they signed to was cancelled.

== Singing career ==
In 2019, Gawin got an opportunity to sing the OST for Dark Blue Kiss, a sequel of his debut series which received warm reception. Since then, he has sung many soundtracks within the industry and earned the title "The Voice of GMMTV".

In 2021, he sang "Dust" from Nabi, My Stepdarling OST, and "Just Understood" from Oh My Boss. In 2022 he sang several soundtrack such as "You Mean The World" from popular series F4 Thailand, "Je T’aime À La Folie" from Enchanté, and "Counting Stars" from Astrophile, to name few.

In 2025, Gawin and co-star Way-ar Sangngern (Joss) won an award for original soundtrack of the year for their song "Ever After" from the My Golden Blood soundtrack. In September of that same year, the duo hosted their "JossGawin Invincible Fancon" concert, performing various songs from their discographies.

Gawin has covered a few English songs in GMMTV's artists project with other artists, which received positive reviews. His cover song "Yellow" along with Vachirawit Chivaaree (Bright) is quite popular among listeners. His other notable cover songs are "Memories", "Best Part", "This Town", "Before You Go", and "Flightless Bird, American Mouth". He has also covered his song "Closer" from the My Golden Blood soundtrack in Japanese, which is featured on the album "BEST OF GMMTV VOL. 2".

In 2026, Gawin joined Riser Music, a subsidiary of GMMTV, after his appearances at the "Riser Music T-Pop Showcase 2026" concerts. He debuted under the label with his single "จำใจ (Gone Away)" on 23 July 2026.

== Filmography ==
=== Television series ===
Key
†	Denotes television productions that have not yet been released

Year	Title	Role	Notes	Network	Ref.
2018	Kiss Me Again	Mork	Support role	GMM25	
2019	Dark Blue Kiss	Mork	Support role	GMM25	
2020	Girl Next Room: Motorbike Baby	Mile	Main role	GMM25	
2021	Not Me	"Dan" Danai Ratchapakdee / UNAR	Support role	GMM25	
2022	Enchanté	Saifa	Support role	GMM25	
2022	Oops! Mr. Superstar Hit on Me	D-Day	Support role	GMM25	
2023	Be My Favorite	Pisaeng Jirawarakul	Main role	GMM25	
2024	Perfect 10 Liners	Warm	Support role	GMM25	
2025	My Golden Blood	Tong	Main role	GMM25	
2025	Hide & Sis	Khem	Support role	GMM25	
2025	Revamp The Undead Story	Tong	Guest role	GMM25	
2025	That Summer	Natee / Paolo	Guest role	One 31	
2026	Only Friends: Dream On	Tua	Main role	One 31	
TBA	Round One †	Nick	Main role	TBA	
TBA	Shooting Stars †	Thee	Support role	TBA	

=== Music video appearances ===
Year	Title	Artist	Label	Ref.
2020	"แค่อีกครั้ง (Better Man)"	Fiat Pattadon	GMMTV Records	
2023	"ย้อนเวลา (REDO)"; Be My Favorite OST	Krist Perawat	GMMTV Records	
2023	"ขอบคุณเท่าไหร่ก็ไม่พอ (Thankful)"; Be My Favorite OST	Krist Perawat	GMMTV Records	
2025	"Just You"; My Golden Blood OST	Joss Way-ar	GMMTV Records	
2026	"ไม่ยอม (All In)"; Only Friends: Dream On OST	Mix Sahaphap	GMMTV Records	

== Discography ==
=== Album appearances ===
Year	Album	Song title	Original soundtrack	Label	Ref.
2026	Best of GMMTV Vol. 2	"Ever After" with Joss Way-ar	My Golden Blood	GMMTV Records	
2026	Best of GMMTV Vol. 2	"Closer"; Japanese version	My Golden Blood	GMMTV Records	

=== Singles ===
==== Digital singles ====
Year	Title	Label	Ref.
2026	"Closer"; Japanese version	GMMTV Records	
2026	"จำใจ (Gone Away)"	Riser Music	

===== Collaborations =====
Year	Title	Label	Ref.
2023	"มีเธอมีฉัน (Safe Zone)" with Krist, Nanon, Bright, Peck, Film, Jam and PERSES	GMM Grammy	
2025	"ที่เธอ (You’re My Way)" with Joss	GMMTV Records	
2026	"Love Feels So Fast" with Joss, Earth, Mix, Boun, Prem, Pond, Phuwin, Force, Book, Joong, Dunk, Jimmy, Sea, First, Khaotung, Gemini, Fourth, Perth, Santa, William, Est, Junior, Mark	GMMTV Records	

===== Soundtrack appearances =====
Year	Title	Series	Label	Ref.
2019	"ต่อให้เป็นจูบสุดท้าย (Even If It's The Last Kiss)"	Dark Blue Kiss	GMMTV Records	
2021	"เศษ (Dust)"	Nabi, My Stepdarling	GMMTV Records	
2021	"เพลง เพิ่งเข้าใจ (Just Understand)"	Oh My Boss	GMMTV Records	
2022	"โลกของฉันคือเธอ (You Mean The World)"	F4 Thailand: Boys Over Flowers	GMMTV Records	
2022	"รู้แค่ผมรักคุณก็พอ (Je T’aime À La Folie)"	Enchanté	GMMTV Records	
2022	"นับดาว (Counting Stars)"	Astrophile	GMMTV Records	
2022	"แม่ไม่ชอบ แต่ฉันชอบ (Be Mine)"	The Three GentleBros	GMMTV Records	
2022	"Sweet But Naughty"	The Warp Effect	GMMTV Records	
2023	"สิ่งเดียวที่ไม่ยอม (Unable)"	Be My Favorite	GMMTV Records	
2023	"เธอก็พอ (It Might Be You)" with Krist Perawat	Be My Favorite	GMMTV Records	
2024	"มุมมอง (Focus)" with Emi Thasorn	Beauty Newbie	GMMTV Records	
2024	"โลกทั้งใบ (Blind)"	Beauty Newbie	GMMTV Records	
2025	"Closer"	My Golden Blood	GMMTV Records	
2025	"Ever After" with Joss Way-ar	My Golden Blood	GMMTV Records	
2026	"ห้ามแต (No One Can)"	Only Friends: Dream On	GMMTV Records	
2026	"Like The Tide" with Joss Way-ar	Only Friends: Dream On	GMMTV Records	
2026	"เอาเลยมั้ย (Let's Try)" Dream On Ver. with Joss, Earth, Mix, Aou, Boom	Only Friends: Dream On	GMMTV Records	

===== Covers =====
Year	Title	Label	Ref.
2020	"เพลง ดวงใจ"	GMMTV Records	
2022	"All 4 Nothing (I'm So in Love)"	GMMTV Records	
2022	"Save Your Tears" with Aye Sarunchana	GMMTV Records	
2023	"ย้อนเวลา (REDO)" with Krist Perawat	Riser Music	

== Concerts ==
Year	Title	Date(s)	Venue	Artist(s)	Ref.
2022	Polca the Journey; Dark Blue Kiss	June 25, 2022	Chaengwattana Hall	With Tay, New, Pod, AJ, Mild, Pluem, Gemini	
2022	Shooting Star Concert; F4 Thailand	July 23, 2022	Union Hall	With Tu, Brigh, Win, Dew, Nani, Prim, Fah, Jan	
2023	GMMTV Musicon Tokyo	July 29, 2023	Zepp DiverCity	With Krist, Nanon, Joong, Gemini, Perth, LYKN	
2023	GMMTV Musicon Tokyo	July 30, 2023	Toyosu PIT	With Krist, Nanon, Joong, Gemini, Perth, LYKN	
2023	GMMTV FanFest in Japan	October 9, 2023	PIA ARENA MM	With Krist, Earth, Mix, Pond, Phuwin, Force, Book, Joong, Dunk, Jimmy, Sea, First, Khaotung, Gemini, Fourth, Perth, Chimon	
2023	Krist Elements Concert	October 22, 2023	Union Hall	With Krist, Singto, Off, Gun, Tay, New	
2023	GMMTV Musicon Jakarta	December 16, 2023	Pullman Jakarta Central Park	With Nanon, Earth, Fourth, Satang, Perth, Ford, LYKN	
2023	GMMTV Starlympics 2023	December 23, 2023	Impact Arena	GMMTV Artists	
2024	GMMTV Starlympics 2024	December 21, 2024	Impact Arena	GMMTV Artists	
2025	GMMTV Musicon Japan	July 26–27, 2025	Toyosu PIT	With Krist, Satang, Keen, Barcode, LYKN, JASP.ER	
2025	JossGawin Invincible Fancon	September 27, 2025	The Mall Lifestore Bangkapi	With Joss, Poon, Barcode, Neo, Mond, Ryu, Satang, Ford	
2025	JimmySea Dreamscape Fancon	November 30, 2025	Union Hall	With Jimmy, Sea, Junior, Book, Tay	
2025	GMMTV Starlympics 2025	December 20, 2025	Impact Arena	GMMTV Artists	
2026	ForceBook Funtopia Fancon	April 4, 2026	Union Hall	With Force, Book, Joss, Jimmy, Junior	
2026	GMMTV Riser Music T-Pop Showcase Tokyo	May 8, 2026	Hokutopia Sakura Hall	With Krist, Nanon, FELIZZ, CLO'VER	
2026	26th Thai Festival in Tokyo	May 9, 2026	Yoyogi Park	With Nanon, Tay, New, LYKN, FELIZZ	
2026	GMMTV Riser Music T-Pop Showcase Tokyo	May 10, 2026	Shibuya Stream Hall	With Krist, Nanon	
2026	LOL Fan Fest 2026: Heart Race	May 22–24, 2026	Impact Arena	With Joss, Earth, Mix, Boun, Prem, Pond, Phuwin, Force, Book, Joong, Dunk, Jimmy, Sea, First, Khaotung, Gemini, Fourth, Perth, Santa, William, Est, Junior, Mark	
2026	GMMTV Musicon Singapore	May 30–31, 2026	Singapore Expo	With Krist, Nanon, LYKN, JASP.ER, FELIZZ, CLO'VER	
2026	JossGawin Heat & Beat Concert	July 28, 2026	Union Hall	With Joss, Krist, Singto, Lego, FLIO	
2026	GMMTV Starlympics 2026	November 28, 2026	Impact Arena	GMMTV Artists	
2027	PEBACA Legacy Fam Concert	January 30–31, 2027	BITEC LIVE	With Krist, Singto, Off, Gun, Tay, New, Nanon Namtan, Nani, JingJing, Prem Sky, Bonnie, Phuwin	
2027	JossGawin Heat & Beat Fancon in Singapore	February 19, 2027	Capitol Theatre, Singapore	With Joss	

Upcoming

== Awards and nominations ==
Year	Award	Category	Nominated work	Result	Ref.
2025	Y Entertain Awards	Rising Star Couple with Joss Way-ar	—N/a	Nominated	
2025	Maya Awards	Original SoundTracks of the year	"Ever After" with Joss Way-ar from the My Golden Blood soundtrack	Won	
2025	Maya Awards	Male Couple of the Year Award with Joss Way-ar	—N/a	Nominated	
2026	KBops Global Awards	King of Boys' Love with Joss Way-ar	—N/a	Won	

== Fan meetings and tours ==
=== Fan meetings ===
Name	Date	Venue	Notes	Ref.
Be My Favorite Final EP. Fan Meeting	August 11, 2023	Mastercard Cinema, SF Cinema, Centralworld, BANGKOK	With Be My Favorite cast	
GMMTV Fan Event in Tokyo	December 14, 2024	Animate Theatre, TOKYO	—N/a	
My Golden Blood Final EP. Fan Meeting	May 28, 2025	Siam Pavalai Theatre, Paragon Complex, BANGKOK	With My Golden Blood cast	
GMMTV Fan Day 21 in Vietnam	June 21, 2025	Army Theatre, HO CHI MINH CITY	With Joss	
JossGawin Fan Meeting in Taipei	July 13, 2025	Zepp New Taipei, Honhui Plaza, TAIPEI	With Joss	
GMMTV Fan Day 22 in Osaka	July 20, 2025	Cool Japan Park, Osaka WW Hall, OSAKA	With Joss	
GMMTV Fan Day 23 in Manila	August 24, 2025	Samsung Hall, SM Aura Premier, MANILA	With Joss	
JossGawin Fan Meeting in Macau	November 10, 2025	The Parisian Theatre, The Parisian, MACAU	With Joss	
Naiin Book Fair 2026	January 26, 2026	Samyan Mitrtown, 5th Fl.	With Joss	
Only Friends: Dream On - The Play Begins	February 27, 2026	7th fl. Centralworld Pulse Hall, BANGKOK	With Only Friends: Dream On cast	
GMMTV Fan Day 30 in Tokyo	March 22, 2026	Nissho Hall, TOKYO	With Joss	
GMMTV Fanival 2026	March 31, 2026	CentralWorld Pulse, 7th Fl.	With Joss	
Into the Light, Closer to You: Gawin Fan Sign in Shenzhen	April 12, 2026	SHENZHEN	—N/a	
Only Friends: Dream On - Final EP. Fan Meeting	May 15, 2026	3rd fl. MCC Hall, The Mall Lifestore Bangkapi, BANGKOK	With Only Friends: Dream On cast	
JossGawin Fan Meeting in Washington D.C.	September 6, 2026	The Howard Theatre, WASHINGTON D.C.	With Joss	
GMMTV Fanival: Happy Family	October 3, 2026	Union Hall, Union Mall, BANGKOK	With Joss	
JossGawin Fan Meeting in Italy	January 16, 2027	Milton Rome Airport Hotel, ROME	With Joss	
GMMTV Fan Day 2027: Taipei	April 17-18, 2027	Zepp New Taipei, Honhui Plaza, TAIPEI	With Joss	

Upcoming

=== Tours ===
Tour	Name	Date	Venue	Notes	Ref.
European Tour	JossGawin Fan Meeting in Madrid	October 4, 2025	Kinépolis Ciudad de la Imagen, MADRID	With Joss	
European Tour	JossGawin Fan Meeting in London	October 6, 2025	The Clapham Grand, LONDON	With Joss	
European Tour	JossGawin Fan Meeting in Paris	October 8, 2025	La Palmeraie, PARIS	With Joss	
US & Latin America Tour	JossGawin Fan Meeting in Brazil	October 11, 2025	Studio Stage, SÃO PAULO	With Joss	
US & Latin America Tour	JossGawin Fan Meeting in Mexico	October 13, 2025	Cuauhtémoc, MEXICO CITY	With Joss	
US & Latin America Tour	JossGawin Fan Meeting in Atlanta	October 15, 2025	Variety Playhouse, ATLANTA	With Joss	
US & Latin America Tour	JossGawin Fan Meeting in Los Angeles	October 17, 2025	The United Theatre on Broadway, LOS ANGELES	With Joss	
Only Friends: Dream On Americas Tour	Only Friends: Dream On in Mexico City	September 9, 2026	Expo Reforma, MEXICO CITY	With Only Friends: Dream On cast	
Only Friends: Dream On Americas Tour	Only Friends: Dream On in Lima	September 12, 2026	Parque de la Exposición, LIMA	With Only Friends: Dream On cast	
Only Friends: Dream On Americas Tour	Only Friends: Dream On in Brazil	September 14, 2026	Teatro Renault, SÃO PAULO	With Only Friends: Dream On cast	
