= Vice Versa (Thai TV series) =

2022 Thai television series

- Official series poster
- Thai: รักสลับโลก
- Genre: Romantic comedy; Fantasy; Boys' love
- Based on: Vice Versa รักสลับโลก by JittiRain
- Directed by: Nuttapong Mongkolsawas
- Starring: Jitaraphol Potiwihok; Tawinan Anukoolprasert
- Country of origin: Thailand
- Original language: Thai
- No. of episodes: 12

Production
- Executive producer: Sataporn Panichraksapong
- Running time: 60 minutes
- Production company: GMMTV

Original release
- Network: GMM25; YouTube
- Release: 16 July – 1 October 2022

Related
- Our Skyy 2

Vice Versa (Thai: รักสลับโลก; RTGS: Rak Salap Lok) is a 2022 Thai romantic fantasy television series starring Jitaraphol Potiwihok (Jimmy) and Tawinan Anukoolprasert (Sea). Based on the novel of the same name by JittiRain (จิตติรินทร์). It was directed by Nuttapong Mongkolsawas (X) and produced by GMMTV. The trailer was announced on GMMTV2022: Borderless event held on December 1, 2021. The series ran for a single season of 12 episodes, which aired from July 16 to October 1, 2022, on GMM25 and GMMTV's YouTube channel.

== Synopsis ==
After a near-death accident, Talay (Tawinan Anukoolprasert) wakes up in an alternate universe inhabiting the body of Tess (Pawat Chittsawangdee). He reunites with Puen (Jitaraphol Potiwihok), a famous actor who is now in Tun (Korapat Kirdpan)'s body after an accident. The two meet Phuwadol (Lalana Kongtoranin), a nurse who helps people from the same universe they left behind, to guide them through life in this new universe. To return home, he must locate his "portkey" — the only person who can send him back once they have accomplished what they need to achieve.

Talay and Puen have a mission to accomplish, and are aided by their friends Kita (Phanuroj Chalermkijporntavee), Fuse (Tharatorn Jantharaworakarn), and Friend Credits members Up (Trai Nimtawat) and Aou (Thanaboon Kiatniran). Love and friendship grow with them in the new universe. What will happen to their mission? Will they be able to return to their home universe?

== Cast and characters ==
=== Main ===
- Jitaraphol Potiwihok (Jimmy) as Puen / Tun
- Tawinan Anukoolprasert (Sea) as Talay / Tess

=== Supporting ===
- Trai Nimtawat (Neo) as Up Preeda
- Thanaboon Kiatniran (Aou) as Aou
- Phanuroj Chalermkijporntavee (Pepper) as Kita
- Tharatorn Jantharaworakarn (Boom) as Fuse
- Lalana Kongtoranin (Jeab) as Phuwadol
- Maneerat Kam-Uan (Ae) as Jupjaeng
- Watsana Phunphon (Ann) as Tess's mother
- Touch Na Takuatung as Tess's father
- Tipnaree Weerawatnodom (Namtan) as Paeng Piyada
- Daweerit Chullasapya (Pae) as Tun's father
- Kanyarat Ruangrung (Piploy) as Gyo (Talay's friend) (Ep. 1, 11–12)
- Tatchapol Thitiapichai (Tanthai) as Joe (Talay's friend) / Pramote (Tess's friend)
- Nophand Boonyai (On) as Arm (BFB director)

=== Guest ===
- Korapat Kirdpan (Nanon) as Pakorn Uea-angkun / Tun
- Pawat Chittsawangdee (Ohm) as Tess Thattawa
- Chatchawit Techarukpong (Victor) as Thana (Tess's brother) (Ep. 1, 8)
- Jiratchapong Srisang (Force) as "Akk" Itsara (Ep. 1)
- Kasidet Plookphol (Book) as "Theo" Asawa-ekanan (Ep. 1)
- Pisit Nimitsamanjit (Fluk) as Tess's friend (Ep. 1)
- Ravipon Pumruang (Aea) as Puen's fan / Airport security guard (Ep. 1)
- Pansa Vosbein (Milk) as Som (Puen's match) (Ep. 2)
- Pattranite Limpatiyakorn (Love) as Prae (Talay's match) (Ep. 2)
- Sureeyares Yakares (Prigkhing) as Tuk-tuk driver (Ep. 2)
- Nitiwadee Tamnyantrong (Tan) as Association of Thai Citizens in the Alternate World's member (Ep. 2)
- Rangsima Mathipornwanich (Kukkai) as Association of Thai Citizens in the Alternate World's member (Ep. 2)
- Atthaphan Phunsawat (Gun) as Third
- Tachakorn Boonlupyanun (Godji) as Tama Guaijeng (bookstore cashier) (Ep. 5)
- Tawan Vihokratana (Tay) as Tong Tawhan (food deliveryman) (Ep. 8, 10)
- Tanapon Sukumpantanasan (Perth) as Mek (director) (Ep. 8–10)
- Sahaphap Wongratch (Mix) as Mix (veterinarian) (Ep. 9–10)
- Pawis Sowsrion (Film) as Director (Ep. 11)
- Leo Saussay as O (Host) (Ep. 12)
- Patara Eksangkul (Foei) as Phuwadol (Nurse) (Ep. 12)

== Reception ==
=== Viewership ===
In the table below, RED numbers indicate the highest ratings for a show and BLUE numbers indicate the lowest ratings for a show.

Thai television ratings
Episode	Episode Name	Broadcast time	Air date	Average ratings	Ref
1	OCEAN BLUE	Every Saturday at 8:30 p.m.	July 16, 2022	0.239	
2	FOREST GREEN	Every Saturday at 8:30 p.m.	July 23, 2022	0.109	
3	SOFT BLUSH	Every Saturday at 8:30 p.m.	July 30, 2022	0.098	
4	DEEP MAGENTA	Every Saturday at 8:30 p.m.	August 6, 2022	0.068	
5	WINTER WHITE	Every Saturday at 8:30 p.m.	August 13, 2022	0.100	
6	FIRE YELLOW	Every Saturday at 8:30 p.m.	August 20, 2022	0.107	
7	SUNSET ORANGE	Every Saturday at 8:30 p.m.	August 27, 2022	0.120	
8	CLOUDY GREY	Every Saturday at 8:30 p.m.	September 3, 2022	0.065	
9	MIDNIGHT BLACK	Every Saturday at 8:30 p.m.	September 10, 2022	0.035	
10	PINK	Every Saturday at 8:30 p.m.	September 17, 2022	0.2	
11	REAL RED	Every Saturday at 8:30 p.m.	September 24, 2022	0.1	
12	CYSTAL CLEAR	Every Saturday at 8:30 p.m.	October 1, 2022	0.1	
Total average				0.112	^{1}

== Release ==
It was broadcast on GMM25 for domestic broadcast and GMMTV's YouTube channel for international streaming. In Vietnam, it was streamed on the online platform TrueID Vietnam every Saturday at 20:35 starting July 16, 2022. In Japan, it was distributed on TELASA every Sunday at midnight from July 31, 2022.

== Spin-off ==
A special behind-the-scenes feature, Inside Vice Versa, aired on July 9, 2022. Although the main series concluded in 2022, Our Skyy 2 includes an episode focusing on this story universe.

== Soundtrack ==
Song name	Artist	Ref.
"Have I Found" (เป็นเธอใช่ไหม)	Sea Tawinan	
"The Key"	Sea Tawinan, Jimmy Jitaraphol	
"By My Side" (มีเพียงเธอ)	Jimmy Jitaraphol	
"Complicated" (ไม่ชัดเจน)	Indy Thanathat	
