= 2016 BWF World Junior Championships – Boys' doubles =

2016 BWF World Junior Championships Boys doubles
Tournament details
- Dates: 8 November 2016 – 13 November 2016
- Edition: 18th
- Level: International
- Venue: Bilbao Arena
- Location: Bilbao

The Boys' Doubles tournament of the 2016 BWF World Junior Championships is a badminton world junior individual championships for the Eye Level Cups, held on November 8–13. The defending champion of the last edition is He Jiting / Zheng Siwei from China. Han Chengkai and Zhou Haodong of China won the gold medal in this event.

== Seeded ==
1. (China) Han Chengkai / Zhou Haodong (champion)
2. (China) He Jiting / Tan Qiang (quarterfinals)
3. (Thailand) Pakin Kuna-Anuvit / Natthapat Trinkajee (semifinals)
4. (Japan) Hiroki Okamura / Masayuki Onodera (fourth round)
5. (France) Thom Gicquel / Toma Junior Popov (quarterfinals)
6. (Malaysia) Leong Jun Hao / Ooi Zi Heng (quarterfinals)
7. (Indonesia) Andika Ramadiansyah / Rinov Rivaldy (quarterfinals)
8. (India) Krishna Prasad Garaga / Satwiksairaj Rankireddy (fourth round)
9. (Poland) Robert Cybulski / Pawel Smilowski (fourth round)
10. (France) Samy Corvee / Leo Rossi (second round)
11. (Indonesia) Muhammad Fachrikar / Bagas Maulana (third round)
12. (Malaysia) Chen Tang Jie / Man Wei Chong (third round)
13. (China) Fan Qiuyue / Ren Xiangyu (semifinals)
14. (Thailand) Warit Sarapat / Panachai Worasaktayanan (fourth round)
15. (Scotland) Christopher Grimley / Matthew Grimley (second round)
16. (Czech Republic) Petr Beran / Jan Louda (fourth round)

== Draw ==
=== Finals ===
Quarterfinals
1	(China) Han Chengkai (China) Zhou Haodong	21	21
6	(Malaysia) Leong Jun Hao (Malaysia) Ooi Zi Heng	8	10
3	(Thailand) Pakin Kuna-Anuvit (Thailand) Natthapat Trinkajee	21	21
5	(France) Thom Gicquel (France) Toma Junior Popov	19	13
7	(Indonesia) Andika Ramadiansyah (Indonesia) Rinov Rivaldy	18	17
13	(China) Fan Qiuyue (China) Ren Xiangyu	21	21
(South Korea) Lee Hong-sub (South Korea) Lim Su-min	14	21	21
2	(China) He Jiting (China) Tan Qiang	21	16	19

Semifinals
1	(China) Han Chengkai (China) Zhou Haodong	21	21
3	(Thailand) Pakin Kuna-Anuvit (Thailand) Natthapat Trinkajee	15	12
13	(China) Fan Qiuyue (China) Ren Xiangyu	15	21	20
(South Korea) Lee Hong-sub (South Korea) Lim Su-min	21	17	22

Finals
1	(China) Han Chengkai (China) Zhou Haodong	21	21
(South Korea) Lee Hong-sub (South Korea) Lim Su-min	17	14

=== Top Half ===
==== Section 1 ====
First round
(Armenia) G Grigoryan (Armenia) A Vardanyan	2	4
(Moldova) V Izbas (Moldova) V Leadavschi	21	21
(Russia) R Alimov (Russia) P Kotsarenko	21	21
(Georgia (country)) G Nalgranyan (Georgia (country)) L Ninoshvili	7	6
(Canada) D Wang (Canada) B Yang	21	21
(New Zealand) C Steeghs (New Zealand) D Vong	9	11

Second round
1	(China) Han CK (China) Zhou HD	21	21
(South Korea) Kang M-h (South Korea) Kim W-h	17	14
(Mexico) J A B Lopez (Mexico) L A M Navarro	21	21
(Moldova) V Izbas (Moldova) V Leadavschi	16	18
11	(Indonesia) M Fachrikar (Indonesia) B Maulana	21	21
(England) C Hemming (England) J Torjussen	9	11
(Russia) R Alimov (Russia) P Kotsarenko	23	21	21
(Canada) D Wang (Canada) B Yang	25	18	16

Third round
1	(China) Han CK (China) Zhou HD	21	21
(Mexico) J A B Lopez (Mexico) L A M Navarro	4	8
11	(Indonesia) M Fachrikar (Indonesia) B Maulana	19	19
(Russia) R Alimov (Russia) P Kotsarenko	21	21

Fourth round
1	(China) Han CK (China) Zhou HD	21	21
(Russia) R Alimov (Russia) P Kotsarenko	12	14

==== Section 2 ====
First round
(Finland) J Kilpi (Finland) J Puro	21	21
(Costa Rica) E Hurtado Rojas (Costa Rica) Z A Zheng Chen	9	12
(Spain) P Alfayate (Spain) A Bernat	9	23
(Macau) Leong I C (Macau) Pui P F	21	25
(Iceland) D B Bjornsson (Iceland) A Tomasson	10	7
(Chinese Taipei) Lin S-c (Chinese Taipei) Lu C	21	21

Second round
6	(Malaysia) Leong J H (Malaysia) Ooi Z H	21	21
(Sri Lanka) S H De Silva (Sri Lanka) P Palliyaguruge	12	8
(Peru) J Guevara (Peru) D Mini	16	19
(Finland) J Kilpi (Finland) J Puro	21	21
15	(Scotland) C Grimley (Scotland) M Grimley	18	20
(Denmark) R Kjaer (Denmark) J Toft	21	22
(Macau) Leong I C (Macau) Pui P F	7	17
(Chinese Taipei) Lin S-c (Chinese Taipei) Lu C	21	21

Third round
6	(Malaysia) Leong J H (Malaysia) Ooi Z H	21	21
(Finland) J Kilpi (Finland) J Puro	9	4
(Denmark) R Kjaer (Denmark) J Toft	14	20
(Chinese Taipei) Lin S-c (Chinese Taipei) Lu C	21	22

Fourth round
6	(Malaysia) Leong J H (Malaysia) Ooi Z H	21	21
(Chinese Taipei) Lin S-c (Chinese Taipei) Lu C	17	11

==== Section 3 ====
First round
(Germany) D Hess (Germany) J C Volker	21	21
(Romania) F Gisca (Romania) D Popescu	11	8
(Sweden) A Gozzi (Sweden) C Harrbacka	21	21
(Belgium) G Bonnet (Belgium) A Lallemand	16	13
(Estonia) K Kert (Estonia) M Loo
(Australia) J Schueler (Australia) K Teoh	w	/	o

Second round
3	(Thailand) P Kuna-Anuvit (Thailand) N Trinkajee	21	21
(Turkey) M Capar (Turkey) E Sonmez	7	13
(Japan) M Kaneko (Japan) Y Kubota	21	21
(Germany) D Hess (Germany) J C Volker	15	13
16	(Czech Republic) P Beran (Czech Republic) J Louda	21	21
(Slovakia) A Horak (Slovakia) R Smatlak	12	8
(Sweden) A Gozzi (Sweden) C Harrbacka	21	21
(Australia) J Schueler (Australia) K Teoh	15	19

Third round
3	(Thailand) P Kuna-Anuvit (Thailand) N Trinkajee	11	21	21
(Japan) M Kaneko (Japan) Y Kubota	21	10	18
16	(Czech Republic) P Beran (Czech Republic) J Louda	21	21
(Sweden) A Gozzi (Sweden) C Harrbacka	19	15

Fourth round
3	(Thailand) P Kuna-Anuvit (Thailand) N Trinkajee	21	21
16	(Czech Republic) P Beran (Czech Republic) J Louda	16	14

==== Section 4 ====
First round
(Malaysia) A Ameer (Malaysia) Hoo P R	21	21
(India) B Joshi (India) M Manjunath	18	12
(Ukraine) D Kovalov (Ukraine) V Rozhkov	14	17
(Norway) M Marum (Norway) M Xu	21	21
(Mongolia) T Boldbaatar (Mongolia) G Enkhjargal	22	10	17
(Portugal) G Almeida (Portugal) M Jorge	20	21	21

Second round
5	(France) T Gicquel (France) T J Popov	21	21
(United States) R Liuzhou (United States) C Yeo	15	5
(Latvia) K Kalnins (Latvia) N Podosinoviks	8	8
(Malaysia) A Ameer (Malaysia) Hoo P R	21	21
9	(Poland) R Cybulski (Poland) P Smilowski	22	21
(Myanmar) Aung Myo Htoo (Myanmar) Phone Pyae Naing	20	17
(Norway) M Marum (Norway) M Xu	21	21
(Portugal) G Almeida (Portugal) M Jorge	15	16

Third round
5	(France) T Gicquel (France) T J Popov	22	7
(Malaysia) A Ameer (Malaysia) Hoo P R	20	7^{r}
9	(Poland) R Cybulski (Poland) P Smilowski	21	21
(Norway) M Marum (Norway) M Xu	13	16

Fourth round
5	(France) T Gicquel (France) T J Popov	21	21
9	(Poland) R Cybulski (Poland) P Smilowski	11	14

=== Bottom Half ===
==== Section 5 ====
First round
(Norway) M Barth (Norway) B Norden	23	21
(Algeria) Y Belhouane (Algeria) S Khaldi	21	18
(Czech Republic) O Král (Czech Republic) J Somerlik	21	19	21
(Sri Lanka) K Amarasena (Sri Lanka) U Liyanage	17	21	19
(Russia) E Kurdyukov (Russia) E Okolov	8	9
(Hong Kong) Chow H L (Hong Kong) Lam W L	21	21

Second round
(Norway) M Barth (Norway) B Norden	9	7
(Czech Republic) O Král (Czech Republic) J Somerlik	21	21
(Belarus) A Kravchenko (Belarus) A Rakipau	14	10
14	(Thailand) W Sarapat (Thailand) P Worasaktayanan	21	21
(Hong Kong) Chow H L (Hong Kong) Lam W L	21	22	21
(Brazil) J Matias (Brazil) C N Santos	8	24	7
(Germany) H Graalmann (Germany) L Resch	14	9
7	(Indonesia) A Ramadiansyah (Indonesia) R Rivaldy	21	21

Third round
(Czech Republic) O Král (Czech Republic) J Somerlik	2^{r}
14	(Thailand) W Sarapat (Thailand) P Worasaktayanan	11
(Hong Kong) Chow H L (Hong Kong) Lam W L	12	12
7	(Indonesia) A Ramadiansyah (Indonesia) R Rivaldy	21	21

Fourth round
14	(Thailand) W Sarapat (Thailand) P Worasaktayanan	10	22	12
7	(Indonesia) A Ramadiansyah (Indonesia) R Rivaldy	21	20	21

==== Section 6 ====
First round
(Sweden) V Aglinder (Sweden) S Ekengren	14	14
(Singapore) Andy Kwek J L (Singapore) Lee J L	21	21
(Chinese Taipei) Su L-w (Chinese Taipei) Ye H-w	21	21
(Romania) C V Filimon (Bulgaria) D Nikolov	10	16
(Spain) J Molares (Spain) A Vazquez	21	21
(Macau) Ao F L (Macau) Lam H H	10	14

Second round
(Singapore) Andy Kwek J L (Singapore) Lee J L	16	16
(Chinese Taipei) Su L-w (Chinese Taipei) Ye H-w	21	21
(Hungary) G Pytel (Hungary) B Szenjaj	6	6
13	(China) Fan QY (China) Ren XY	21	21
(Spain) J Molares (Spain) A Vazquez	21	21	21
(Canada) M Morneau (Canada) N Nguyen	23	17	23
(Japan) S Nihei (Japan) N Yamazawa	12	21	16
4	(Japan) H Okamura (Japan) M Onodera	21	15	21

Third round
(Chinese Taipei) Su L-w (Chinese Taipei) Ye H-w	13	13
13	(China) Fan QY (China) Ren XY	21	21
(Canada) M Morneau (Canada) N Nguyen	7	7
4	(Japan) H Okamura (Japan) M Onodera	21	21

Fourth round
13	(China) Fan QY (China) Ren XY	18	21	21
4	(Japan) H Okamura (Japan) M Onodera	21	19	14

==== Section 7 ====
First round
(Denmark) D Lundgaard (Denmark) M Muurholm	10	11
(South Korea) Lee H-s (South Korea) Lim S-m	21	21
(Lithuania) P Bertasius (Lithuania) J Petkus	17	12
(New Zealand) E Lau (New Zealand) R Yang	21	21
(Chinese Taipei) Chen M-h (Chinese Taipei) Chen X-y	21	21
(Slovenia) M Ivancic (Slovenia) R Jercinovic	10	13

Second round
(South Korea) Lee H-s (South Korea) Lim S-m	21	21
(New Zealand) E Lau (New Zealand) R Yang	5	10
(Italy) F Caponio (Italy) G Toti	6	15
12	(Malaysia) Chen T J (Malaysia) Man W C	21	21
(Chinese Taipei) Chen M-h (Chinese Taipei) Chen X-y	21	21
(Finland) J Övermark (Finland) J Paul	11	15
(Bulgaria) I Panev (Bulgaria) D Yanakiev	16	18
8	(India) K P Garaga (India) S Rankireddy	21	21

Third round
(South Korea) Lee H-s (South Korea) Lim S-m	21	16	21
12	(Malaysia) Chen T J (Malaysia) Man W C	16	21	12
(Chinese Taipei) Chen M-h (Chinese Taipei) Chen X-y	17	17
8	(India) K P Garaga (India) S Rankireddy	21	21

Fourth round
(South Korea) Lee H-s (South Korea) Lim S-m	18	21	22
8	(India) K P Garaga (India) S Rankireddy	21	16	20

==== Section 8 ====
First round
(Peru) B B Deza (Peru) D S Tokumura	18	18
(Australia) T Tan (Australia) H Tang	21	21
(Belgium) E Bracke (Belgium) J Carraggi	16	9
(Indonesia) R Adam (Indonesia) C Kristanto	21	21
(United States) S Ding (United States) G Kalyanasundaram	18	21	21
(Portugal) M Rocha (Portugal) C A Silva	21	18	18

Second round
(Australia) T Tan (Australia) H Tang	7	5
(Indonesia) R Adam (Indonesia) C Kristanto	21	21
(England) M Flynn (England) D Jones	21	21
10	(France) S Corvee (France) L Rossi	13	16
(United States) S Ding (United States) G Kalyanasundaram	21	21
(South Africa) B Nel (South Africa) D K Schaap	19	15
(Ukraine) R Altunyan (Ukraine) O Chakalov	9	5
2	(China) He JT (China) Tan Q	21	21

Third round
(Indonesia) R Adam (Indonesia) C Kristanto	23	21
(England) M Flynn (England) D Jones	21	12
(United States) S Ding (United States) G Kalyanasundaram
2	(China) He JT (China) Tan Q	w	/	o

Fourth round
(Indonesia) R Adam (Indonesia) C Kristanto	17	19
2	(China) He JT (China) Tan Q	21	21
