= Round One (TV series) =

Thai upcoming television series

- Official pilot poster
- Thai: รักวนกับคนเดิม
- Genre: Romance; Drama; Sci-fi
- Directed by: Aticha Tanthanawigrai
- Starring: Way-Ar Sangngern; Gawin Caskey
- Country of origin: Thailand
- Original language: Thai

Production
- Production companies: GMMTV; Parbdee Taweesuk

Round One (Thai: รักวนกับคนเดิม lit. 'Falling in Love With The Same Person Repeatedly.'; RTGS: Rak Won Kap Khon Doem) is an upcoming Thai boys' love television series starring Way-Ar Sangngern (Joss) and Gawin Caskey.

Directed by Aticha Tanthanawigrai and produced by GMMTV and Parbdee Taweesuk, it was announced at the "Only Friends Dream On : Final EP. Fan Meeting" event for the 2026 television series Only Friends: Dream On on May 15, 2026, after the cancellation of the previous project both of the main leads were signed to.

== Synopsis ==
When professional boxer Zack (Way-Ar Sangngern) and sports journalist Nick (Gawin Caskey) inexplicably find themselves in a time loop, the two must work together to figure out what destiny wants them to fix as they are forced to relive the same day over and over again.

== Cast and characters ==
=== Main ===
- Way-Ar Sangngern (Joss) as Zack
- Gawin Caskey as Nick

=== Supporting ===
- Pakin Kunaanuwit (Mark) as Mile
- Thipakorn Thitathan (Ohm) as North
- Thinnaphan Tantui (Thor) as Tao
- Chayuth Gorsurat (Titan)
- Ratapirom Bandapraneat (Michiru)
- Phudtripart Bhudthonamochai (Ryu)
