= Be My Favorite =

2023 Thai television series

- Official series poster
- Thai: บทกวีของปีแสง
- Genre: Romance; Drama; Supernatural
- Based on: "You Are My Favorite" (บทกวีของปีแสง) by JittiRain
- Screenplay by: Waasuthep Ketpetch; Issaraporn Kuntisuk
- Directed by: Waasuthep Ketpetch
- Starring: Gawin Caskey; Perawat Sangpotirat
- Opening theme: "ย้อนเวลา (Redo)" by Krist Perawat
- Ending theme: "ย้อนเวลา (Redo)" by Krist Perawat (Ep. 1–3) "สิ่งเดียวที่ไม่ยอม (Unable)" by Gawin Caskey (Ep. 4–6) "ขอบคุณเท่าไหร่ก็ไม่พอ (Thankful)" by Krist Perawat (Ep. 7) "เธอก็พอ (It Might Be You)" by Gawin Caskey and Krist Perawat (Ep. 8–12)
- Composers: Perawat Sangpotirat; Achariya Dulyapaiboon
- Country of origin: Thailand
- Original language: Thai
- No. of episodes: 12

Production
- Executive producers: Sataporn Panichraksapong; Darapa Choeysanguan
- Producers: Kamthorn Lorjitramnuay; Puchong Tuntisungwaragul; Patha Thongpan; Watthana Rujirojsakul; Supaporn Lertthitiverakarn
- Cinematography: Wongwattana Chunhavuttiyanon
- Running time: 45-50 minutes
- Production companies: GMMTV; Parbdee Taweesuk

Original release
- Network: GMM 25; Viu
- Release: 26 May – 11 August 2023

Be My Favorite (Thai: บทกวีของปีแสง; RTGS: Botkawi Khong Pisaeng, lit. 'Poetry of Light Year') is a Thai boys' love television series starring Gawin Caskey and Perawat Sangpotirat (Krist) based on the novel of the same name by JittiRain (จิตติรินทร์).

Directed by Waasuthep Ketpetch and produced by GMMTV and Parbdee Taweesuk, it was announced at the GMMTV 2022 Borderless event held on 1 December 2021.

The series aired on GMM 25 on 26 May 2023, airing on Wednesdays at 20:30 ICT, and was made available for streaming on Viu at 22:30 ICT.

== Synopsis ==
The life of Kawi (Perawat Sangpotirat) changes forever when the crystal ball, an important gift that he once intended to buy for his crush in their first year of college, took him back in time to live at the age of eighteen again: with a catch. Instead of just falling for Praemai (Sarunchana Apisamaimongkol) like last time, he instead returned to a world constantly trying to push him towards Pisaeng (Gawin Caskey), Praemai's future husband. As Kawi abuses the power for the crystal ball more and more for the life he wants, he finds both his past and future falling apart, with the only constant left in his reality being Pisaeng.

== Cast and characters ==
=== Main ===
- Perawat Sangpotirat (Krist) as Botkawi Nitiphat (Kawi)
- Gawin Caskey as Pisaeng Jirawarakul

=== Supporting ===
- Sarunchana Apisamaimongkol (Aye) as Praemai (Pear)
- Thanaboon Kiatniran (Aou) as Max
- Kirati Puangmalee (Title) as Knot
- Montree Jensukorn (Pu) as The Mysterious Man
- Justina Suvanvihok (Jus) as Kwan
- Songsit Rungnopakunsi (Kob) as Thawi Nitiphat (Botkawi's father)
- Grace Mahadumrongkul as Tridao Jirawarakul (Pisaeng's mother)
- Phollawat Manuprasert (Tom) as Phongsathorn (Praemai's father)

=== Guest ===
- Dujdao Vadhanapakorn as Praemai's mother

== Production ==
On 13 September 2022, it was revealed that Chinnarat Siriphongchawalit (Mike) had decided to step down from the series and was replaced by Gawin Caskey in the role of Pisaeng.

== Original soundtrack ==
The official soundtrack for Be My Favorite features:

Song	Artist(s)	Label	Ref.
"ย้อนเวลา (Redo)"	Krist Perawat	GMMTV Records	
"สิ่งเดียวที่ไม่ยอม (Unable)"	Gawin Caskey	GMMTV Records	
"ขอบคุณเท่าไหร่ก็ไม่พอ (Thankful)"	Krist Perawat	GMMTV Records	
"เธอก็พอ (It Might Be You)"	Gawin Caskey and Krist Perawat	GMMTV Records	
