= Last Twilight =

2023–24 Thai television series

- Official series poster
- ภาพนายไม่เคยลืม
- Genre: Romantic drama; Boys' love
- Screenplay by: Pongsate Lucksameepong; Kittisak Kongka
- Directed by: Noppharnach Chaiyahwimhon
- Starring: Jitaraphol Potiwihok; Tawinan Anukoolprasert; Pakin Kunaanuwit; Tipnaree Weerawatnodom; Thipakorn Thitathan; Rachanun Mahawan
- Theme music composer: Wutticha Kuanium
- Opening theme: "ภาพสุดท้าย (Last Twilight)" by William Jakrapatr
- Country of origin: Thailand
- Original language: Thai
- No. of seasons: 1
- No. of episodes: 12

Production
- Cinematography: Rath Roongrueangtantisook
- Running time: 45–60 minutes
- Production company: GMMTV

Original release
- Network: GMM 25; YouTube
- Release: 10 November 2023 – 26 January 2024

Last Twilight (Thai: ภาพนายไม่เคยลืม; RTGS: Phap Nai Mai Khoei Luem, lit. 'Your Image, Never Forget') is a 2023 Thai television series, starring Jitaraphol Potiwihok (Jimmy) and Tawinan Anukoolprasert (Sea). This series was directed by Noppharnach Chaiyahwimhon and produced by GMMTV. The series premiered on GMM 25 on 10 November 2023, airing on Fridays at 20:30 ICT.

== Synopsis ==
Burdened with a heavy debt, Mhok (Jitaraphol Potiwihok), a technical college student, applies for a well-paying job as a caregiver for Day (Tawinan Anukoolprasert), a badminton player who is partially blind due to infectious keratitis. Day hires Mhok, who unlike the other applicants seems to have no pity for him. Spending so much time together, the two develop a deep bond. When Day learns that he has approximately 180 days until he loses his remaining vision, how will the two face the challenges ahead?

== Cast and characters ==
=== Main ===
- Jitaraphol Potiwihok (Jimmy) as Mhok
- Tawinan Anukoolprasert (Sea) as Day

=== Supporting ===
- Pakin Kunaanuwit (Mark) as Night
- Tipnaree Weerawatnodom (Namtan) as Porjai
- Rachanun Mahawan (Film) as Gee
- Thipakorn Thitathan (Ohm) as August
- Premsinee Ratanasopa (Cream) as Ramon
- Chawin Chitsomboon (Jugg) as Uea (Day & Night's father)
- Kunchanuj Kengkarnka (Kun) as On (Day's blind friend)
- Thasorn Klinnium (Emi) as Pla
- Apiwit Reardon (Rang) as Pae
- Thames Sanpakit as Singha

== Soundtrack ==
No.	Title	Artist	Ref.
1	"ประตูวิเศษ (Better Days)"	Jimmy Jitaraphol, Sea Tawinan	
2	"ต้องโทษดาว" (Mhok Ver.)	Jimmy Jitaraphol	
3	"แค่คืบ (One Palm Distance)"	Satang Kittiphop	
4	"ภาพสุดท้าย (Last Twilight)"	William Jakrapatr	
5	"ต้องโทษดาว" (Day Ver.)	Sea Tawinan	

== Awards and nominations ==
Year	Award	Category	Recipient(s)	Result	Ref.
2024	ContentAsia Awards 2024	Best Asian LGBTQ+ Programme	Last Twilight	Gold	
2024	Maya TV Awards 2024	Series of the Year	Last Twilight	Won	
2024	Asian Academy Creative Awards 2024	Best Direction (Fiction)	Aof Noppharnach Chaiyahwimhon	Won	
2024	Asian Academy Creative Awards 2024	Best Screenplay	Bee Pongsate Lucksameepong, Best Kittisak Kongka	Won	
2024	Asian Academy Creative Awards 2024	Best Sound	Uten Tiyan	Won	
2024	HOWE Awards 2024	Hottest Series	Last Twilight	Won	
2024	29th Asian Television Awards	Best Drama Series	Last Twilight	Nominated	
2024	29th Asian Television Awards	Best Actor in a Leading Role	Sea Tawinan	Nominated	
2024	29th Asian Television Awards	Best Actor in a Supporting Role	Mark Pakin	Nominated	
2024	29th Asian Television Awards	Best Actress in a Supporting Role	Namtan Tipnaree	Nominated	
2024	29th Asian Television Awards	Best Theme Song	"ภาพสุดท้าย (Last Twilight)"	Nominated	
2024	29th Asian Television Awards	Best Direction (Drama or Fiction)	Noppharnach Chaiyahwimhon	Nominated	
2024	29th Asian Television Awards	Best Cinematography (Drama or Fiction)	Rath Roongrueangtantisook	Nominated	
2024	29th Asian Television Awards	Best Original Screenplay	Pongsate Lucksameepong, Kittisak Kongka	Nominated	
2024	29th Asian Television Awards	Best Scriptwriting	Pongsate Lucksameepong, Kittisak Kongka	Nominated	
2024	29th Asian Television Awards	Best Editing (Drama or Fiction)	Rungroj Prachyakun	Won	
2024	Y Entertain Awards 2024	Best BL Series of the Year	Last Twilight	Won	
2024	Y Entertain Awards 2024	Best Y Series Director of the Year	Aof Noppharnach Chaiyahwimhon	Won	
2024	Y Universe Awards 2024	Best Series	Last Twilight	Won	
2024	Y Universe Awards 2024	Best Leading Actor	Sea Tawinan	Won	
2024	Y Universe Awards 2024	Best Supporting Actor	Mark Pakin	Won	
2024	Y Universe Awards 2024	Best Director	Aof Noppharnach	Won	
2024	Y Universe Awards 2024	Best Script	Aof Noppharnach, Best Kittisak	Won	
2024	Y Universe Awards 2024	Best Series that Reflects on Society	Last Twilight	Won	
