= Jitaraphol Potiwihok =

Thai actor, model and singer (born 1994)

- จิตรพล โพธิวิหค
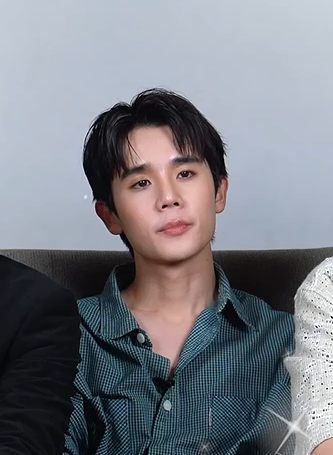
- Jitaraphol in April 2025
- Born: 21 August 1994 (age 32); Bangkok, Thailand
- Other name: Jimmy
- Education: Chiang Mai University; Thammasat University
- Occupations: Actor; Doctor
- Years active: 2021–present
- Agent: GMMTV
- Known for: Wai in Bad Buddy; Mhok in Last Twilight; Thap in My Magic Prophecy
- Height: 180 cm (5 ft 11 in)

Jitaraphol Potiwihok (Thai: จิตรพล โพธิวิหค; born 21 August 1994), nicknamed Jimmy (Thai: จิมมี่), is a Thai actor under GMMTV. He is also a licensed medical doctor, having graduated from the Faculty of Medicine at Chiang Mai University. He is best known for his roles in the television series Bad Buddy (2021), Vice Versa (2022), and Last Twilight (2023).

== Early life and education ==
Jitaraphol was born in Thailand. He completed his secondary education at Assumption College in Bangkok. He later enrolled at Chiang Mai University, where he studied at the Faculty of Medicine and earned a Doctor of Medicine (M.D.) degree. Jitaraphol completed an internship in Switzerland and earned his Master of Medical Science in Cosmetic Dermatology from Thammasat University in 2026.

== Career ==
=== 2018–2020: Pre-debut ===
In 2018, he participated in the CLEO 50 Most Eligible Bachelors contest.

In 2020, he was a guest on the show Doctor, I'll Take Care of You on the YouTube channel Atimeonline.

=== 2021–present: Breakthrough in acting ===
He entered the Thai entertainment industry as an actor under GMMTV. He gained wider recognition in 2021 for his supporting role as Wai in the popular Thai television series Bad Buddy. He continued to expand his career with a lead role in Vice Versa (2022).

In 2023, Jitaraphol starred as Mhok in the television drama Last Twilight. The series marked his first major leading role and significantly increased his popularity. His performance received positive attention, particularly for its emotional depth. Following the success of Last Twilight, he became more prominent in lead and promotional projects under GMMTV.

== Public image ==
Jitaraphol is noted for his calm public demeanor and mature image. He has attracted attention for balancing a career in entertainment with a background in medicine. His on-screen partnership with Tawinan Anukoolprasert (Sea) in the series Vice Versa, Last Twilight, and My Magic Prophecy contributed to his international fanbase.

== Filmography ==
=== Television series ===
Key
| † | Denotes television productions that have not yet been released |

| Year | Title | Role | Network | Notes | Ref. |
|---|---|---|---|---|---|
| 2021 | Bad Buddy | Wai | GMM25 | Supporting role | |
| 2022 | Enchanté | Sun | GMM25 | Supporting role | |
| 2022 | Vice Versa | Puen / Tun | GMM25 | Main role | |
| 2023 | Our Skyy 2 | Puen | GMM25 | Main role | |
| 2023 | Last Twilight | Mhok | GMM25 | Main role | |
| 2024 | Ploy's Yearbook | "Mek" Noppatee | GMM25 | Main role | |
| 2025 | Sweet Tooth, Good Dentist | Captain | GMM25 | Supporting role | |
| 2025 | My Magic Prophecy | "Thap" Thapfah Kittiphokhin | GMM25 | Main role | |
| 2026 | Peach and Me | Himself | GMM25 | Guest role | |
| TBA | I Will Always Save You † | Pongpuen | TBA | Main role | |
| TBA | Boys 4 Moms † | "Ben" Benjamin | TBA | Main role | |
| TBA | Itaewon Class: Thai Edition † | TBA | TBA | Main role | |

=== Television show ===
| Year | Title | Network | Notes |
|---|---|---|---|
| 2018 | Toey Tiew Thai: The Route | One 31 | Ep 341 |
| 2021 | Play ลิฟต์ | GMMTV | Ep 2 |
| 2022 | Safe House Season 3 | GMMTV | |
| 2022 | Arm Share | GMMTV | Ep 101, 110, 113 |
| 2022 | กระหายเล่า Krahai Lao | GMMTV | Ep 25 |
| 2022 | School Rangers | GMM25 | Ep 229–230 |
| 2023 | Project Alpha | GMM25 | Ep 10 |
| 2023 | School Rangers | GMM25 | Ep 294–295 |
| 2024 | Sound Check 2024 | One 31 | Ep 11 |
| 2024 | Arm Share | GMMTV | Ep 150 |
| 2024 | High Season แคมป์ซ่าฮาทุกฤดู | GMMTV | Ep 3–7 |
| 2024 | Pepsi Friend Feast Guide with Gemini-Fourth | GMMTV | Ep 4 |
| 2024 | School Rangers | GMM25 | Ep 17–19 |
| 2024 | Sip Sense Challenge | GMMTV | |
| 2024 | โตมาเป็น Grow Up to Be | One Playground | Ep 13 |
| 2025 | จตุรMeet ยกหยุดโลก | GMMTV | Ep 4 |
| 2025 | High Season Season 4 On the Beach | GMMTV | Ep 4–8 |
| 2025 | The Wall Song | Workpoint TV | Ep 265 |
| 2025 | Arm Share | GMMTV | Ep 191 |

== Discography ==
=== Singles ===
==== Collaborations ====
| Year | Title | Notes |
|---|---|---|
| 2024 | "แกล้งป่วย (Flirting Syndrome)" (with Sea Tawinan) | |
| 2024 | "You're My Treasure" (with Earth, Mix, Pond, Phuwin, First, Khaotung, Joong, Dunk, Gemini, Fourth, Perth, Chimon, Force, Book, Sea, Winny, Satang) | Love Out Loud Fan Fest 2024 |
| 2024 | "เพราะฉันมีเธออยู่ (Love Is You)" (with Sea Tawinan) | |
| 2025 | "อาจไม่ได้พูดคำว่ารัก (No Need To Say)" (with Sea Tawinan) | |
| 2026 | "Love Feels So Fast" (with Earth, Mix, Pond, Phuwin, First, Khaotung, Joong, Dunk, Gemini, Fourth, Perth, Santa, Force, Book, Sea, Boun, Prem, William, Est, Junior, Mark, Joss, Gawin) | Love Out Loud Fan Fest 2026 |

==== Soundtrack appearances ====
| Year | Title | Album |
|---|---|---|
| 2022 | "The Key" (with Sea Tawinan) | Vice Versa OST |
| 2022 | "มีเพียงเธอ (By My Side)" | Vice Versa OST |
| 2023 | "ใครคลั่งรักกว่ากัน (Madly in Love)" (with Sea Tawinan) | Our Skyy 2 OST |
| 2023 | "ประตูวิเศษ (Better Days)" (with Sea Tawinan) | Last Twilight OST |
| 2023 | "ต้องโทษดาว... (Blame the Stars...) [Mhok Version]" | Last Twilight OST |
| 2024 | "เธอคือพรุ่งนี้ (My Tomorrow)" (with Earth, Joong, Toy, Mond) | Ploy's Yearbook OST |
| 2025 | "เคราะห์รัก (Meant To Be Yours)" | My Magic Prophecy OST |
| 2025 | "เพราะโลกนี้มีเธอแค่คนเดียว (There’s Only You)" (with Sea Tawinan) | My Magic Prophecy OST |

== Awards and nominations ==
Award nominations for Jitaraphol Potiwihok
| Year | Award | Category | Nominee(s) | Result | Ref. |
|---|---|---|---|---|---|
| 2024 | Y Entertain Awards 2024 | Leading Boys’ Love Star of the Year | Last Twilight | Nominated | |
| 2025 | Y Entertain Awards 2025 | Best BL Actor of the Year | My Magic Prophecy | Nominated | |
| 2025 | Thailand Headlines Person of the Year Awards | Culture and Entertainment | with Tawinan Anukoolprasert | Won | |
| 2026 | The Viral Hits Awards 2025 | Best BL Actor of the Year | | Won | |
| 2026 | The Viral Hits Awards 2025 | Best BL Couple of the Year | with Tawinan Anukoolprasert | Nominated | |
| 2026 | Thailand Y Content Awards 2025 | Best Leading Actor | My Magic Prophecy | Nominated | |
