= My Magic Prophecy =

2025 Thai television series

- Official series poster
- Thai: ทำนายทายทัพ
- Genre: Romantic comedy
- Directed by: Natthaphong Wongkaweepairod
- Starring: Jitaraphol Potiwihok; Tawinan Anukoolprasert
- Country of origin: Thailand
- Original language: Thai
- No. of episodes: 10

Production
- Production companies: GMMTV; Maker–Y Studio

Original release
- Network: GMM 25; Viu
- Release: 27 July – 28 September 2025

My Magic Prophecy (Thai: ทำนายทายทัพ; RTGS: Thamnai Thai Thap) is a 2025 Thai romantic comedy television series starring Jitaraphol Potiwihok (Jimmy) and Tawinan Anukoolprasert (Sea). Produced by GMMTV and Maker–Y Studio, the series was announced during the GMMTV 2025: Riding The Wave event on 26 November 2024. It aired on GMM 25 from 27 July to 28 September 2025 and is available for streaming on Viu.

== Synopsis ==
Inthu Thammasirikul (Tawinan Anukoolprasert), a tarot reader, fakes a reading to impress the mother of his best friend Thordao (Chompoopuntip Temtanamongkol). During the visit, he meets Thapfah Kittipokin (Jitaraphol Potiwihok), a critical care doctor and Thordao's older brother, who disapproves of fortune telling.

In accidentally predicts that Thap will face misfortune. Initially skeptical, Thap begins to experience a series of unlucky events. His friends advise him to take a break, and he agrees to hide out with In in Mae Hong Son, a remote town in northern Thailand, until things settle down.

== Cast ==
=== Main ===
- Jitaraphol Potiwihok (Jimmy) as Dr. Thapfah Kittipokin (Thap)
- Tawinan Anukoolprasert (Sea) as Inthu Thammasirikul (In)

=== Supporting ===
- Save Saisawat as Inspector Ton
- Naruth Prateeppavameta (Franc) as Pokpong (Pong)
- Kanaphan Puitrakul (First) as Karn
- Panachai Sriariyarungruang (Junior) as Tul
- Chompoopuntip Temtanamongkol (Acare) as Thordao Kittipokin (Dao)
- Danai Charuchinta (Kik) as In's father
- Paythai Ploymeeka (Phe) as Kasidis
- Athichanan Srisevok (Ice) as Thara
- Naruemon Phongsupap (Koy) as Thephi (Thap and Dao's mother)
- Apinan Prasertwattanakul (M) as Thap and Dao's father
- Himawari Tajiri as Khaohom
- Thanat Danjesda (Nut) as Tiwmek Kittipokin (Mek)

=== Guest ===
- Kasidet Plookphol (Book) as Wan (Ep. 7–8)

== Original soundtrack ==
No.	Title	Performer	Length
1.	"Meant to Be Yours" (เคราะห์รัก)	Jimmy Jitaraphol	3:55
2.	"There's Only You" (เพราะโลกนี้มีเธอแค่คนเดียว)	Jimmy Jitaraphol; Sea Tawinan	4:27
3.	"Moonlight"	Sea Tawinan	3:44

== Production ==
Teeradech Vitheepanich (Tee) was originally supposed to play the role of Inspector Ton but was later replaced by Save Saisawat. No official reason for the casting change was announced.

== Live events ==
=== Fan meetings ===
Year	Date	Event name	Venue	Ref.
2025	27 July	My Magic Prophecy: Let the Magic Begin	Siam Pavalai Royal Grand Theatre	
2025	28 September	My Magic Prophecy Lucky in Love Fan Party	MCC Hall, The Mall Lifestore Bangkapi	
2025	29 September	My Magic Prophecy Lucky in Love After Party	MCC Hall, The Mall Lifestore Bangkapi	

== Awards and nominations ==
Award nominations for My Magic Prophecy
Year	Award	Category	Nominee(s)	Result	Ref.
2025	Y Entertain Awards 2025	Best BL Series of the Year	My Magic Prophecy	Nominated	
2025	Y Entertain Awards 2025	Best BL Actor of the Year	Jitaraphol Potiwihok	Nominated	
2026	Y Universe Awards 2025	The Best BL Series	My Magic Prophecy	Won	
2026	Sanook Top of the Year 2025	Best BL Series	My Magic Prophecy	Nominated	
2026	Thailand Y Content Awards 2025	Best Series	My Magic Prophecy	Nominated	
2026	Thailand Y Content Awards 2025	Best Director	Natthaphong Wongkaweepairod	Nominated	
2026	Thailand Y Content Awards 2025	Best Editing	My Magic Prophecy	Nominated	
2026	Thailand Y Content Awards 2025	Best Leading Actor	Jitaraphol Potiwihok	Nominated	
2026	Thailand Y Content Awards 2025	Best Promotion of Thai Tourism	My Magic Prophecy	Nominated	
2026	Thailand Y Content Awards 2025	Best Series Script	My Magic Prophecy	Nominated	

=== Listicles ===
Year-end lists for My Magic Prophecy
Critic/Publication	List	Rank	Ref.
Teen Vogue	13 Best BL Dramas of 2025	Included	
