= Nabi, My Stepdarling =

2021 Thai television series

- Official series poster
- Thai: นาบี ฉันจะไม่รักเธอ
- Genre: Romantic drama; Mystery; Thriller
- Screenplay by: Wanwipa Samngamjam
- Directed by: Kritsada Techanilobon
- Starring: Way-Ar Sangngern; Yongwaree Anilbol; Myria Benedetti
- Opening theme: "เศษ (Dust)" by Fluke Gawin
- Ending theme: "เศษ (Dust)" (Piano version) by Aye Sarunchana
- Composer: Tanatat Chaiyaat
- Country of origin: Thailand
- Original language: Thai
- No. of episodes: 22

Production
- Executive producer: Sataporn Panichraksapong
- Producers: Ratchanok Saeng-Chuto; Nuttapong Mongkolsawas
- Running time: 50 minutes
- Production companies: GMMTV; Prakaifah Production

Original release
- Network: GMM 25; Viu
- Release: February 22 – May 11, 2021

Nabi, My Stepdarling (Thai: นาบี ฉันจะไม่รักเธอ; RTGS: Nabi Chan Ja Mai Rak Thoe) is a 2021 Thai romantic drama television series starring Way-Ar Sangngern (Joss), Yongwaree Anilbol (Fah) and Myria Benedetti (Nat). Directed by Kritsada Techanilobon and produced by GMMTV together with Prakaifah Production, it was announced as one of the television series of GMMTV for 2021 during their "GMMTV2021: The New Decade Begins" event on December 3, 2020. It premiered on GMM 25 on February 22, 2021, airing Mondays and Tuesdays at 20:30 ICT and episodes were available to stream on Viu at 22:30 ICT the same day.

== Synopsis ==
Nabi (Yongwaree Anilbol), the manager of Dubai Club, is the younger sister of Sirin, the club's former manager who suddenly disappeared. Nabi takes the job at the club, owned by Phichetchai, to investigate her sister's disappearance. However, Phichetchai's wife, Waree, suspects her husband and Sirin were having an affair, a belief aggravated by Weeranat (Myria Benedetti), who is also in love with Phichetchai. Waree becomes consumed by paranoia until a tragic accident leads to her death. Kawin (Way-Ar Sangngern), Phichetchai and Waree's son, returns from his studies abroad immediately after his mother's death, suspecting foul play. Kawin had confessed his feelings to Nabi before he left, with the latter turning him down despite her own feelings. When reunited, Nabi tries to use her best friend Pong (Luke Ishikawa Plowden) to mislead Kawin, who only agrees when Nabi promises to help him win back his first love Saendee (Ployshompoo Supasap). As Kawin investigates his mother's death, all clues lead back to Sirin as the guilty party and with Phichetchai's fondness of Nabi, Kawin mistakenly believes Nabi wants to elevate her status to become his stepmother, fueling a deep resentment between them.

== Cast and characters ==
=== Main ===
- Way-Ar Sangngern (Joss) as Kawin (Win)
- Yongwaree Anilbol (Fah) as Nabi
- Myria Benedetti (Nat) as Weeranat (Wee)

=== Supporting ===
- Luke Ishikawa Plowden as Pongpop (Pong)
- Ployshompoo Supasap (Jan) as Saendee (Saen)
- Tachakorn Boonlupyanun (Godji) as Finne
- Phromphiriya Thongputtaruk (Papang) as Phraphai
- Patara Eksangkul (Foei) as Ohm
- Ploynira Hiruntaveesin (Kapook) as Chonlada
- Oliver Poupart (An) as Phichetchai (Chet)
- Wanpiya Oamsinnoppakul (Gwang) as Juju
- Apinan Prasertwattanakul (M) as Chertchai
- Nipawan Taveepornsawan (Kai) as Jungjai
- Suttida Kasemsant Na Ayutthaya (Nook) as Waree (Wa)
- Kritsiri Suksawat (Krissie) as Sirin (Rin)

=== Guest ===
- Krittaphat Chanthanaphot (Pong) as Doctor (Ep. 9)

== Original soundtrack ==
The official soundtrack for Nabi, My Stepdarling features:

Song	Artist(s)	Label	Ref.
"เศษ (Dust)"	Fluke Gawin	GMMTV Records	
"เศษ (Dust)"; Piano version	Aye Sarunchana	GMMTV Records	
