= My Golden Blood =

2025 Thai television series

- Official series poster
- Original title: เลือดนายลมหายใจฉัน
- Based on: My Golden Blood (เลือดนายลมหายใจฉัน) by Dawin (ดวินทร์)
- Written by: Issaraporn Kuntisuk; Sorawit Muangkaew; Kanokphan Ornrattanasakul; Piangpaitoon Satrawaha; Natthakit Fungcharoen; Arpaphan Saksiriwatekul
- Directed by: Saroj Kunatanad
- Starring: Way-ar Sangngern; Gawin Caskey
- Country of origin: Thailand
- Original language: Thai
- No. of episodes: 12

Production
- Producers: Noppharnach Chaiyahwimhon; Rabob Pokanngaen
- Cinematography: Nattapong Pakdeesri
- Editor: Karn Sukkasit
- Running time: 48 minutes
- Production companies: GMMTV; Matching Max Solutions

Original release
- Network: GMM 25
- Release: March 12 – May 28, 2025

My Golden Blood (Thai: เลือดนายลมหายใจฉัน; RTGS: Lueat Nai Lom Haichai Chan) is a 2025 Thai fantasy television series based on the novel of the same name. It was broadcast every Sunday from 20:50 to 21:45 (ICT) on MCOT HD, while the uncut version was shown on Line TV at midnight of the same day. The series consisted of a total of 12 episodes and premiered on 15 May 2025 until 31 July 2025. It stars Way-Ar Sangngern (Joss) and Gawin Caskey, and is directed by Saroj Kunatanad, and produced by GMMTV and Matching Max Solutions. The series was announced at the GMMTV UP&ABOVE PART1 event on 17 October 2023. The series premiered on GMM 25 on March 12, 2025.

== Synopsis ==
Before he meets Tong, who gives him a reason to live, Mark, a vampire, has been searching for the meaning of existence for decades. But vampires can't resist Tong's rare and potent blood, so in addition to keeping Tong safe from other vampires, Mark must battle his own urge and balance instinct and love.

== Cast and characters ==
=== Main ===
- Way-Ar Sangngern (Joss) as Mark Amarittrakul / Mark Jensen
- Gawin Caskey (Fluke) as Tong

=== Supporting ===
- Apasiri Nitibhon (Um) as Thara Amarittrakul
- Tanutchai Wijitvongtong (Mond) as Nakan Amarittrakul
- Trai Nimtawat (Neo) as Tonkla (Tong's friend)
- Janya Thanasawangkul (Ya) as Wan
- Panadda Ruangwut as Nuan
- Napapat Sattha-atikom (Chelsea) as Pupae (Basketball team manager)
- Chayapol Jutamas (AJ) as Dome (Basketball player)

=== Guest ===
- Dante Armando Williams as young Tong (Uncredited) (Ep. 1)
- Saranbhorn Praditsan (Merview) as Meena (Uncredited) (Ep. 1)
- Singha Luangsuntorn as Navin (Uncredited) (Ep. 12)

== Soundtrack ==
Year	Title	Artist	Label	Ref.
2025	"Closer"	Gawin Caskey	GMMTV Records	
2025	"Just You"	Joss Way-ar	GMMTV Records	
2025	"Ever After"	Joss Way-ar and Gawin Caskey	GMMTV Records	

== Release ==
My Golden Blood premiered on GMM 25 on March 12, 2025 every Wednesday. The series is available on streaming platform GagaOOLala and IQIYI. It was also available on YouTube on GMMTV Official channel.

== Accolades ==
=== Awards and nominations ===
Year	Award	Category	Nominated work	Result	Ref.
2025	Maya Awards	Original SoundTracks of the year	"Ever After"	Won	
2026	Thailand Y Content Awards 2025	Best Special Effects	My Golden Blood	Pending	

=== Listicles ===
Year-end lists for My Golden Blood
Critic/Publication	List	Rank	Ref.
Teen Vogue	13 Best BL Dramas of 2025	Included	
