= Natthapat Trinkajee =

Thai badminton player (born 2000)

Personal information
- Born: 12 June 2000 (age 26) Bangkok, Thailand
- Height: 1.66 m (5 ft 5 in)

Sport
- Country: Thailand
- Sport: Badminton

Men's doubles
- Highest ranking: 64 (26 February 2019)
- BWF profile
Medal record
Men's badminton
Representing Thailand
World Junior Championships
Bronze medal – third place	2016 Bilbao	Boys' doubles
Bronze medal – third place	2016 Bilbao	Mixed team
Asian Junior Championships
Bronze medal – third place	2016 Bangkok	Mixed team

Natthapat Trinkajee (Thai: ณัฐพัฒน์ ตฤณขจี; born 12 June 2000) is a Thai badminton player. He won the bronze medal at the 2016 World Junior Championships alongside Pakin Kuna-anuvit.

== Achievements ==
=== BWF World Junior Championships ===
Boys' doubles
Year	Venue	Partner	Opponent	Score	Result
2016	Bilbao Arena; Bilbao, Spain	(Thailand) Pakin Kuna-anuvit	(China) Han Chengkai (China) Zhou Haodong	15–21, 12–21	Bronze

=== BWF International Challenge/Series (2 titles, 5 runners-up) ===
Men's doubles
Year	Tournament	Partner	Opponent	Score	Result
2016	Bulgaria International	(Thailand) Pakin Kuna-anuvit	(Bulgaria) Philip Shishov (Bulgaria) Alex Vlaar	21–19, 21–19	(gold) Winner
2018	Slovak Open	(Thailand) Pakin Kuna-anuvit	(Chinese Taipei) Lu Chen (Chinese Taipei) Ye Hong-wei	18–21, 20–22	(silver) Runner-up
2022	Belgian International	(Thailand) Sirawit Sothon	(Chinese Taipei) Chang Ko-chi (Chinese Taipei) Po Li-wei	11–21, 21–19, 17–21	(silver) Runner-up
2023	Thailand International	(Thailand) Sirawit Sothon	(Japan) Kazuki Shibata (Japan) Naoki Yamada	19–21, 11–21	(silver) Runner-up
2023 (II)	India International	(Thailand) Sirawit Sothon	(Thailand) Chaloempon Charoenkitamorn (Thailand) Thanawin Madee	17–21, 17–21	(silver) Runner-up
2023	Bahrain International	(Thailand) Sirawit Sothon	(China) Xie Haonan (China) Zeng Weihan	15–21, 9–21	(silver) Runner-up
2024	Sri Lanka International	(Thailand) Sirawit Sothon	(Indonesia) Reza Dwicahya Purnama (Indonesia) Rian Canna Varo	21–19, 21–7	(gold) Winner

BWF International Challenge tournament
BWF International Series tournament
BWF Future Series tournament
