= Tawinan Anukoolprasert =

Thai actor, model and singer (born 1999)

- ทวินันท์ อนุกูลประเสริฐ
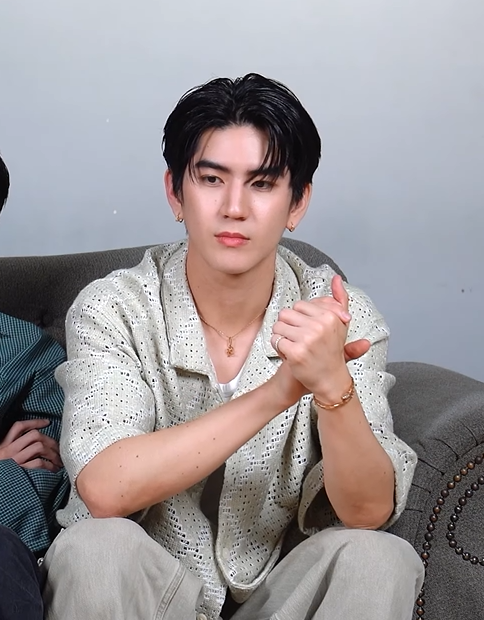
- Tawinan in April 2025
- Born: 13 April 1999 (age 27); Bangkok, Thailand
- Other name: Sea
- Education: Kasetsart University
- Occupation: Actor
- Years active: 2021–present
- Agent: GMMTV
- Known for: Talay in Vice Versa; Day in Last Twilight; In in My Magic Prophecy
- Height: 178 cm (5 ft 10 in)

Tawinan Anukoolprasert (Thai: ทวินันท์ อนุกูลประเสริฐ; born 13 April 1999), nicknamed Sea (Thai: ซี), is a Thai actor. He is best known for his work in Thai television dramas, particularly boys’ love (BL) series, and is affiliated with GMMTV, a major Thai entertainment company.

== Early life and education ==
Tawinan was born in Thailand. He graduated with a degree in Business Administration from Kasetsart University.

== Career ==
Sea began his entertainment career after signing with the Thai talent agency GMMTV in 2021. He made his acting debut with a supporting role in the series 55:15 Never Too Late (2021).

His first main lead role was in the romantic fantasy drama Vice Versa (2022). He gained wider recognition in 2023 after starring in the romantic drama Last Twilight, playing the role of Day.

== Filmography ==
=== Television series ===
Key
†	Denotes television productions that have not yet been released

Year	Title	Role	Network	Notes	Ref.
2021	55:15 Never Too Late	Pangpond	GMM25	Supporting role	
2022	Vice Versa	Talay / Tess	GMM25	Main role	
2023	Our Skyy 2	Talay	GMM25	Main role	
2023	Last Twilight	Day	GMM25	Main role	
2024	The Trainee	"Tae" Thanat	GMM25	Supporting role	
2024	Perfect 10 Liners	Thongfah	GMM25	Guest role (Ep 6–8)	
2025	Sweet Tooth, Good Dentist	Sea	GMM25	Cameo (Ep. 11)	
2025	My Magic Prophecy	"In" Inthu Thammasirikul	GMM25	Main role	
2026	Wu	"Top" Thawit Anantarakan	GMM25	Guest role (Ep. 1)	
2026	Ticket to Heaven	"Joe" Jirasak Tosanti	GMM25	Guest role (Ep. 4–5)	
2026	Peach and Me	Himself	GMM25	Guest role (Ep. 4)	
2026	Weirdo-101	Cheewin	One 31	Guest role (Ep. 5–6)	
TBA	I Will Always Save You †	Pepper / Sornrak Falom	TBA	Main role	
TBA	High & Low: Born to Be High †	Kit	TBA	TBA	
TBA	Boys 4 Moms †	Key	TBA	Main role	

=== Television show ===
Year	Title	Network	Notes
2021	เจนจัด ก๊อตจิก Up Level Special	GMMTV	31 October 2021
2021	Arm Share	GMMTV	Ep 83
2022	Arm Share	GMMTV	Ep 89, 101, 107, 110, 113
2022	Safe House Season 3	GMMTV	
2022	กระหายเล่า Krahai Lao	GMMTV	Ep 25
2022	School Rangers	GMM25	Ep 229–230
2022	Talk with Toeys	GMM25	Ep 78
2023	Project Alpha	GMM25	Ep 5, 10
2023	School Rangers	GMM25	Ep 294–295
2024	Sound Check 2024	One 31	Ep 11
2024	High Season แคมป์ซ่าฮาทุกฤดู	GMMTV	Ep 3–7
2024	Pepsi Friend Feast Guide with Gemini-Fourth	GMMTV	Ep 4, 9
2024	School Rangers	GMM25	Ep 17–19
2024	ชวนเล่น Challenge Special	GMMTV	16 September 2024
2024	Sip Sense Challenge	GMMTV	
2024	โตมาเป็น Grow Up to Be	One Playground	Ep 13
2024	Arm Share	GMMTV	Ep 162
2025	Arm Share	GMMTV	Ep 172–173, 193
2025	Tred Tray Fest with Tay Tawan	GMMTV	Special Ep 8
2025	Based on 2 Stories	GMMTV	Ep 1
2025	The Wall Song	Workpoint TV	Ep 265
2026	Trend to ร่างทอง	GMMTV	Ep 1

== Discography ==
=== Singles ===
==== Collaborations ====
Year	Title	Notes
2024	"แกล้งป่วย (Flirting Syndrome)" (with Jimmy Jitaraphol)	
2024	"You're My Treasure" (with Earth, Mix, Pond, Phuwin, First, Khaotung, Joong, Dunk, Gemini, Fourth, Perth, Chimon, Force, Book, Jimmy, Winny, Satang)	Love Out Loud Fan Fest 2024
2024	"เพราะฉันมีเธออยู่ (Love Is You)" (with Jimmy Jitaraphol)	
2025	"อาจไม่ได้พูดคำว่ารัก (No Need To Say)" (with Jimmy Jitaraphol)	
2026	"Love Feels So Fast" (with Earth, Mix, Pond, Phuwin, First, Khaotung, Joong, Dunk, Gemini, Fourth, Perth, Santa, Force, Book, Jimmy, Boun, Prem, William, Est, Junior, Mark, Joss, Gawin)	Love Out Loud Fan Fest 2026

==== Soundtrack appearances ====
Year	Title	Album
2022	เ"ป็นเธอใช่ไหม (Have I Found)"	Vice Versa OST
2022	"The Key" (with Jimmy Jitaraphol)	Vice Versa OST
2023	"ใครคลั่งรักกว่ากัน (Madly in Love)" (with Jimmy Jitaraphol)	Our Skyy 2 OST
2023	"ประตูวิเศษ (Better Days)" (with Jimmy Jitaraphol)	Last Twilight OST
2024	"ต้องโทษดาว... (Blame the Stars...) [Day Version]"	Last Twilight OST
2025	"เพราะโลกนี้มีเธอแค่คนเดียว (There’s Only You)" (with Jimmy Jitaraphol)	My Magic Prophecy OST
2025	"Moonlight"	My Magic Prophecy OST

== Awards and nominations ==
Award nominations for Tawinan Anukoolprasert
Year	Award	Category	Nominee(s)	Result	Ref.
2024	29th Asian Television Awards	Best Actor in a Leading Role	Last Twilight	Nominated	
2024	Y Entertain Awards 2024	Leading Boys’ Love Star of the Year	Last Twilight	Nominated	
2024	Y Universe Awards 2024	Best Leading Actor	Last Twilight	Won	
2025	Thailand Headlines Person of the Year Awards	Culture and Entertainment	with Jitaraphol Potiwihok	Won	
2026	The Viral Hits Awards 2025	Best BL Couple of the Year	with Jitaraphol Potiwihok	Nominated	
