= Sweet Tooth, Good Dentist =

2025 Thai television series

- Official series poster
- Thai: แฟนที่ทันตแพทย์ส่วนใหญ่แนะนำ
- Genre: Romance; Comedy
- Based on: Sweet Tooth, Good Dentist (แฟนที่ทันตแพทย์ส่วนใหญ่แนะนำ) by JittiRain
- Screenplay by: Pongsate Lucksameepong; Pratchaya Thavornthummarut
- Directed by: Banchorn Vorasataree
- Starring: Pakin Kunaanuwit; Thipakorn Thitathan
- Opening theme: "ยาวิเศษ (Magic Potion)" by Mark Pakin and Ohm Thipakorn
- Composer: Orave Pinijsarapirom
- Country of origin: Thailand
- Original language: Thai
- No. of episodes: 11

Production
- Executive producers: Sataporn Panichraksapong; Darapa Choeysanguan
- Producers: Noppharnach Chaiyahwimhon; Rabob Pokanngaen
- Cinematography: Danuwat Jettana; Sittipong Kongtong; Sirawich Thongkhum
- Running time: 42–58 minutes
- Production companies: GMMTV; Hosanna Halelujah

Original release
- Network: GMM 25; IQIYI
- Release: 21 March – 6 June 2025

Sweet Tooth, Good Dentist (Thai: แฟนที่ทันตแพทย์ส่วนใหญ่แนะนำ; RTGS: Faen Thi Thantaphaet Suan Yai Naenam, lit. 'Boyfriend That Most Dentists Recommend') is a 2025 Thai boys' love television series starring Pakin Kunaanuwit (Mark) and Thipakorn Thitathan (Ohm) based on the novel of the same name by JittiRain (จิตติรินทร์).

It aired on GMM 25 on 21 March 2025, airing every Friday at 20:30 ICT, and was available for streaming on IQIYI at 21:30 ICT the same day. Directed by Banchorn Vorasataree and produced by GMMTV and Hosanna Halelujah, it was announced during the GMMTV Up & Above Part 2 event on 23 April 2024.

== Synopsis ==
When Sant (Thipakorn Thitathan), a college student and ASMR streamer who loves to eat sweets finds out he has a cavity, he has to be treated by Dr. Jay (Pakin Kunaanuwit), a handsome student dentist with some strange habits. When their relationship that started with just one set of teeth evolves to taking care of each other's, Sant slowly begins to realise Dr. Jay's care seems to be more beneficial for his doctor than Jay's patient.

== Cast and characters ==
=== Main ===
- Pakin Kunaanuwit (Mark) as Jay
- Thipakorn Thitathan (Ohm) as Sant (Croissant)

=== Supporting ===
- Jitaraphol Potiwihok (Jimmy) as Captain
- Poon Mitpakdee as Gugg
- Benyapa Jeenprasom (View) as Yada

=== Guest ===
- Krongkwan Nakornthap (Jaoying) as An (Ep. 2, 4–6)
- Rattanawadee Wongthong (Mim) as Baipor (Ep. 6, 9–11)
- Thanawat Rattanakitpaisan (Khaotung) as Jeng (Ep 9–10)
- Phuang Chernyim (Na) as Sant's grandfather (Ep. 7–8, 11)
- Passorn Boonyakiat (Honey) as Jay's mother (Ep. 8–11)
- Tawinan Anukoolprasert (Sea) (cameo, Ep. 11)

== Original soundtrack ==
The official soundtrack for Sweet Tooth, Good Dentist features:

Song	Artist(s)	Label	Ref.
"ยาวิเศษ (Magic Potion)"	Mark Pakin and Ohm Thipakorn	GMMTV Records	
"Mr. Romantic"	Mark Pakin	GMMTV Records	
"ยิ้มได้เพราะเธอ (Make Me Smile)"	Ohm Thipakorn	GMMTV Records	
