= 3 Will Be Free =

2019 Thai television series

- Official series poster
- Thai: 3 Will Be Free – สามเราต้องรอด
- Genre: Drama; Action; Romance; Crime
- Created by: GMMTV
- Directed by: Tidakorn Pookaothong
- Starring: Lapassalan Jiravechsoontornkul; Way-Ar Sangngern; Tawan Vihokratana
- Ending theme: "ฝากเวลา" (Fahk Welah) by The White Hair Cut
- Country of origin: Thailand
- Original language: Thai
- No. of episodes: 10

Production
- Running time: 50 minutes
- Production companies: GMMTV; Trasher Bangkok

Original release
- Network: One31; LINE TV
- Release: 9 August – 11 October 2019

3 Will Be Free (Thai: 3 Will Be Free – สามเราต้องรอด; 3 Will Be Free – Sam Rao Tong Rot) is a 2019 Thai television series starring Lapassalan Jiravechsoontornkul (Mild), Way-Ar Sangngern (Joss) and Tawan Vihokratana (Tay).

Directed by Tidakorn Pookaothong and produced by GMMTV together with Trasher Bangkok, the series was one of the thirteen television series for 2019 launched by GMMTV during their "Wonder Th13teen" event on 5 November 2018. It premiered on One31 and LINE TV on 9 August 2019, airing on Fridays at 22:30 ICT and 23:30 ICT, respectively. The series concluded on 11 October 2019.

== Synopsis ==
Neo (Way-Ar Sangngern), a bisexual male stripper/prostitute, begins an affair with Vanika (Inthira Charoenpura), a famous actress and the second wife of Sia Thana (Sarut Vichitrananda), a real estate mogul and mob kingpin. Phon (Natthawut Jenmana) and Ter (Chanagun Arpornsutinan), the two hitmen working for Thana, are tasked to kill Neo and punish Vanika. Upon finding the pair, Ter tries to shoot Neo, but accidentally shoots and kills Vanika instead. Neo runs to the strip club where he works and is followed by Phon; earlier, Shin (Tawan Vihokratana), Thana's only son who happens to be a reluctant heir of his father's mob empire, comes to the same bar with his friends and meets Miw (Lapassalan Jiravechsoontornkul), a hostess at the bar. Shin's friends pay Miw to sleep with Shin (unbeknownst to them, Shin is gay, and doesn't actually sleep with Miw). Afterwards, Shin and Miw both return to the bar. In the bathroom, Shin runs into Neo, who is hiding from Phon, and who has apparently met Shin before (this is revealed later in the series). Phon discovers them, but is stopped by Miw, who accidentally shoots and kills Phon. Neo, Miw, and Shin escape together and begin a harrowing journey that takes them from a seedy Bangkok motel, to the jungle and to the ocean as they try to evade those who are trying to find them.

Phon's death devastates not only Ter, but Phon's lover, Mae (Watchara Sukchum), a transgender female waitress who has long wanted Phon to leave the life of a gangster. Mae and Ter vow to take revenge on Phon's killers and follow the trio to the jungle, where they are hiding out with the assistance of Leo (Suphakorn Sriphothong), Neo's brother. The trio also seeks refuge in Miw's hometown and receives help from her ex-boyfriend, Luang (Pumipat Paiboon), while simultaneously dealing with Boss John, a mob leader in direct conflict with Thana, and the brother of Miw's step-father (who had tried to rape her years earlier and was accidentally killed by Miw). As their survival adventure continues, the trio develop strong feelings of friendship and loyalty towards each other with Neo, Miw, and Shin finding themselves in a romantic relationship. By the end of the series, all three must face the repercussions of their actions and the actions of others.

== Cast and characters ==
Below are the cast of the series:

=== Main ===
- Lapassalan Jiravechsoontornkul (Mild) as Miw
- Way-Ar Sangngern (Joss) as Neo
- Tawan Vihokratana (Tay) as Shin

=== Supporting ===
- Watchara Sukchum (Jennie) as Mae
- Chanagun Arpornsutinan (Gunsmile) as Ter
- Natthawut Jenmana (Max) as Phon
- Pumipat Paiboon (Prame) as Luang
- Suphakorn Sriphothong (Pod) as Leo (Neo's brother)
- Jirakit Kuariyakul (Toptap) as PP
- Sivakorn Lertchoochot (Guy) as Touch
- Harit Cheewagaroon (Sing) as James
- Naphon Phromsuwan (Stop) as Boss John
- Sarut Vichitrananda (Big) as Sia Thana
- Inthira Charoenpura as Vanika (Thana's Wife)
- Sarocha Watitapun (Tao)
- Penpak Sirikul as Miw's mother
- Arisara Wongchalee (Fresh)
- Krittanai Arsalprakit (Nammon) as Ken

=== Guest ===
- Theepisit Mahaneeranon (Frame)
- Pronpiphat Pattanasettanon (Plustor) as Nurse / Hitman

== Soundtrack ==
Song title	Romanized title	Artist	Ref.
ฝากเวลา	Fahk Welah	The White Hair Cut	

== Awards and nominations ==
Year	Award Ceremony	Category	Recipient(s)	Result	Ref.
2020	LINE TV Awards	Best Kiss Scene	3 Will Be Free	Nominated	
