= Lalana Kongtoranin =

Thai beauty pageant winner and physician

- Born: 1987 (age 38–39)
- Occupations: Actor, doctor, beauty pageant winner

Lalana Kongtoranin is a former Thai beauty pageant winner, actor and medical doctor.

Kongtoranin won the title of Miss Thailand in 2006 and later completed her studies in medicine at Ramathibodi Hospital, working as an emergency room doctor (as of 2023). While practicing medicine, she is also working as an actor in movies and television dramas.

She originally wanted to be a dentist; after her pageant title win, “she spoke of her dream to open a free clinic for underprivileged people”. She founded the “Let’s Be Heroes” foundation while in university, with help from some of her professors. The foundation in involved in three main activities: teaching basic life support and the use of AEDs; providing a free mobile medical specialist clinic and running an animal rescue programme under the care of veterinary personnel. The foundation provides free medical care in rural locations and teaches CPR classes since 2018.

For a period of around 10 years, Kongtranin would often work an overnight medical shift then go straight to her acting job at 8am, causing health issues and anxiety problems. As of 2024, she only works early morning shifts at the hospital in an attempt to have a better work-life balance.
