= The United Theatre =

Cultural and Performance Center in Westerly, Rhode Island

The United Theater
- Interactive map of The United Theater
- Address: 5 Canal Street; Westerly, RI; United States
- Coordinates: 41.379922°N 71.829721°W
- Owner: UNITED THEATRE LLC
- Capacity: 700 People, 76-seat main cinema, a 24-seat micro-cinema, a 100-seat balcony cinema, and a multi-purpose event and gallery space

Construction
- Built: 1926
- Opened: 1926; 100 years ago
- Closed: 1986; 40 years ago
- Reopened: 2021; 5 years ago
- Architects: Aaron Montgomery Ward; Montgomery Ward Company

Website
- https://unitedtheatre.org/

The United Theater, commonly known as The United, is a historic center for performing arts and a cinema on High Street in Westerly, Rhode Island, originally opened on January 18, 1926. The United Theatre serves as a cultural hub for the community, hosting films, live performances, and special events, maintaining its role as a central entertainment venue in Westerly.

== History ==
The United Theater is a contributing property to the Westerly Downtown Historic District. It was originally a vaudeville venue opened on January 18, 1926. The opening night featured the Seven Rainbow Girls, Eddie Cooke and the Shaw Sisters, Bernard and Ferris, Exposition Jubilee, and the Jean Jackson Troupe. Increasing competition from newer multiplexes and alternative entertainment options led to its closure in 1986, although the building remained an important historical landmark.

In recent years, efforts have been made to restore and revitalize the United, aiming to bring it back to life as a cultural venue. The United also works closely with The Public’s Radio, Rhode Island’s NPR station, as well as with the Newport Folk Festival and Newport Jazz Festival with the goal of bringing in larger acts to Westerly.

=== Architecture ===
The main brick building was completed in 1928. It features elements characteristic of the Art Deco style, with façade and interior details which reflect the glamor of the era. The theater has undergone various renovations over the years, and efforts have been made to preserve its historic charm while adapting it for modern use.

The United's second building is recognizable by the Montgomery Ward "Spirit of Progress" design at the top of the wall; it was built as a Montgomery Ward retail store in 1900.

=== Restoration ===
The Westerly Land Trust bought the building in 2003, with the theater declaring itself as a non-profit in 2015. The theater opened its doors in 2021.

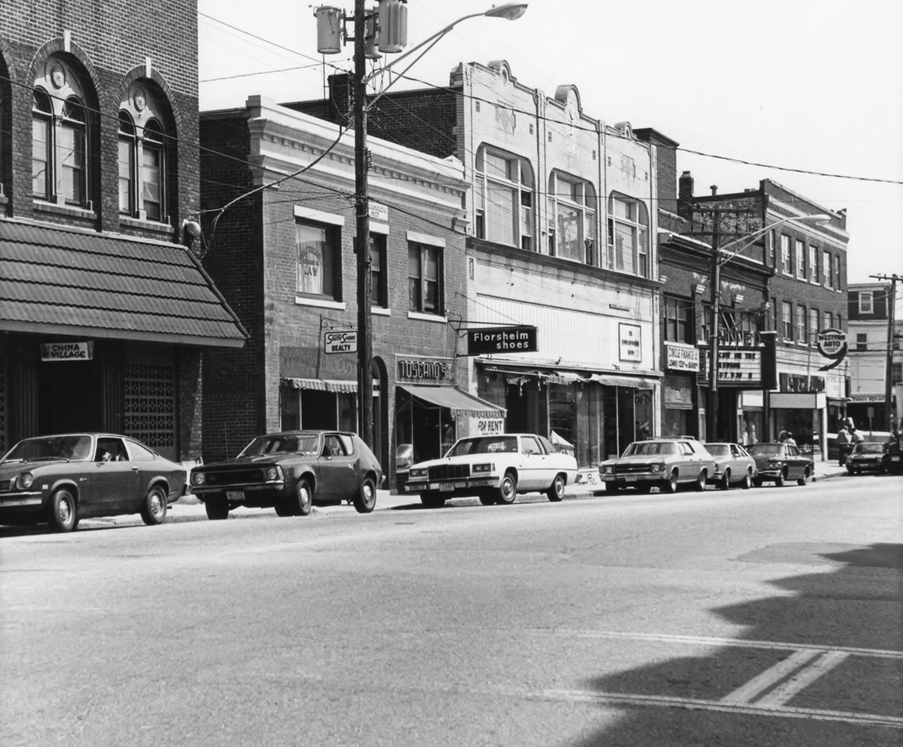
View of northeast side of Canal Street between Railroad Avenue and High Street
