= Arm Share =

2019 Thai web series

- Genre: Lifestyle; Fashion; Food
- Country of origin: Thailand
- Original language: Thai
- No. of episodes: 155

Production
- Production location: Thailand
- Running time: 20 minutes
- Production company: GMMTV

Original release
- Network: YouTube; LINE TV
- Release: 16 April 2019 – present

Arm Share is a Thai variety web series produced by GMMTV. It is hosted by Weerayut Chansook (Arm), it is currently available for streaming on YouTube and LINE TV.

== Synopsis ==
Each episode, Arm, along with his guests fellow juniors and senior actors from GMMTV, will offer their viewers different variety of contents like challenges and games, sharing tips and personal cares, house visit, sharing life events, promoting different kind of products, food trip, travel and other things.

The series premiered on 16 April 2019 and currently airs every other Wednesday of the month.

== Episodes ==
No.	Title	Original release date	Ref.
1	หลังสงกรานต์หน้าไหม้ ดูแลผิวยังไง ?	16 April 2019	
2	'อาร์ม' ลองทำ Celery Juice ให้พนักงาน GMMTV ดื่ม!!	5 June 2019	
3	ปากเปื่อย!! รีวิวลิปสติก 28 แท่ง	12 June 2019	
4	ดูแลผิวหน้ายังไง ? Day & Night Routine	19 June 2019	
5	Update น้ำหอมใหม่ๆ	26 June 2019	
6	แต่งตัวให้แพง!!! เด็ก; GMMTV ทายไปหลักหมื่น!!!	3 July 2019	
7	อาร์ม พาเด็ก GMMTV ไปกินร้านส้มตำน้องรีจ๊อย; ARM SHARE TASTING	10 July 2019	
8	เมื่อ "อาร์ม" ต้องเป็น stylist ให้กับ "คริส - สิงโต" ในงาน PERAYA PARTY PART.1	17 July 2019	
9	ถึงเวลาต้องขึ้นเวที PERAYA PARTY PART.2 (จบ)	24 July 2019	
10	อาร์ม ลงแช่บ่อออนเซ็นแบบส่วนตัวสุดๆ	31 July 2019	
11	หน้าสด!! รีวิวคลีนซิ่ง	7 August 2019	
12	เข้าสู่โลกของ "ไข่เค็ม"; ARM SHARE TASTING	14 August 2019	
13	น้ำกระชายที่ว่าแน่ยังแพ้.......	21 August 2019	
14	เมื่อ อาร์ม ต้องแต่งหน้า ปลื้ม - ชิม่อน ให้พี่ถาตรวจ	3 July 2019	
15	จะรอดไหม? โลกแฟชั่นของปลื้ม - ชิม่อน	4 September 2019	
16	เมื่อ 'อาร์ม' ต้องไป Shopping ฮงแด แทน 'ออฟ-กัน'	11 September 2019	
17	ตามรอยซีรีส์ Hotel Del Luna	18 September 2019	
18	เบื้องหลัง Photobook Go Together ll	25 September 2019	
19	รีวิวกันแดดไม่ซ้ำ กับ 13 ชุดที่เกาหลี	2 October 2019	
20	ไปเกาหลีใต้กินอะไรกัน ?	9 October 2019	
21	ทุ่มสุดตัวเพื่อ FUNTASTIC BABII	23 October 2019	
22	อาร์ม & 91จึ้งมาก จัดปาร์ตี้วันเกิด	30 October 2019	
23	กว่าจะขายไอเดีย รถโรงเรียน ผ่าน!	6 November 2019	
24	เขาเลี้ยงน้องพี่ดีมั้ยไม่รู้... แต่พี่จัดหนักมาก!	13 November 2019	
25	ครั้งแรกในชีวิต! อาร์ม - ออฟ ตัดชุดให้น้องนิริน	20 November 2019	
26	อาร์ม - เต ศึกนัดล้างตา	27 November 2019	
27	ครั้งแรก! อาร์ม ทำชุดให้ SISSY Girl Group	4 December 2019	
28	ทดสอบ ‘อาร์ม’ สอน ‘ม่อน’ แต่งหน้าแบบห้ามมอง	18 December 2019	
29	ประมูลเสื้อ ARM SHARITY	15 January 2020	
30	เปิดหมดกล่อง! กับแบรนด์ idolo	22 January 2020	
31	ขาเกือบฉีก!! เมื่อส่ง ‘อาร์ม’ – ไวท์’ ไปเล่นที่ฮิโรชิม่า	29 January 2020	
32	อาร์ม สายชอป VS ไวท์ สาย(รัก)สัตว์	12 February 2020	
33	จึ้งมาก! ขอแฟนที่วัดเทพมณเฑียร / ชวนแม่หมอต๊อกแต๊ก A4 หาคู่	26 February 2020	
34	เปิดสูตร WAX ขนขาของอาร์ม	11 March 2020	
35	ครั้งแรก! เปิดโต๊ะเครื่องแป้ง "เจนนี่" แบบนี้มันต้องซื้อเพิ่ม	25 March 2020	
36	กักตัวแบบนี้ ดูแลผิวกันหน่อย	8 April 2020	
37	SKIN CARE SHARE	22 April 2020	
38	เพลงก็ร้อง ท้องก็หิวไก่	6 May 2020	
39	ARM SHARE LIVE FAN ASK	28 May 2020	
40	ตู้เสื้อผ้าอาร์มมีแตกกับ ออฟ แอมป์ ซิง	28 May 2020	
41	ไม่น่าเชื่อ! นี่คือตู้เสื้อผ้า "กันสมาย"	17 June 2020	
42	เบื้องหลัง 'อาร์ม' ทำชุดงาน Global Live Fan Meeting กับ 4 คู่จิ้น!!!	1 July 2020	
43	แข่งปอกทุเรียนลูกละ 5,000	15 July 2020	
44	รู้แล้วใช่มั้ย "เต ตะวัน" ทำไมไม่ย้ายห้อง	29 July 2020	
45	แผนซ้อนแผน เซอร์ไพรส์แม่ "คริส พีรวัส" ตลอดทั้งวัน	12 August 2020	
46	เบื้องหลังทำชุด กับ 2 ลุค ของ SIZZY X NANON	26 August 2020	
47	เสียเหงื่อไม่ว่า เสียหน้าไม่ได้	9 September 2020	
48	แพ้แก้ผ้าในห้าง!! อาร์ม-ออฟ-กันสมาย ศึกครั้งนี้แพ้ไม่ได้	23 September 2020	
49	ครูตะลึง! นี่หรือคืองานปั้น อาร์ม-ไบร์ท-วิน	7 October 2020	
50	เล่นใบ้แบบนี้ เจ้าของภาษามีงง!!!	21 October 2020	
51	เปิดห้องนอน ชิม่อน ครั้งแรก ปลื้ม-อาร์ม เป็นงง	11 November 2020	
52	Mission อะไร ทำไม "ข้าวตัง" โดดขึ้นหลัง "ป๊อด"	25 November 2020	
53	และแล้ววันนี้ก็มาถึง! 6 ชุด จากฝีมือเพื่อนให้เพื่อน	8 December 2020	
54	ต้นไม้อะไรราคาตั้ง 150,000 !	16 December 2020	
55	กัน - ม่อน คู่อริใหม่!! นี่เกมเชื่อมสัมพันธ์เหรอ?	30 December 2020	
56	ศึกดวลธนู นึกว่าดู The Hunger Game	13 January 2021	
57	ARM - PROUD FAVORITE BAG 2020	27 January 2021	
58	ปกติรับบทคนดู วันนี้รับบทคนเชิด(สิงโต)	10 February 2021	
