= Thai LGBTQ cinema =

Thai queer cinema is a category of Thai films that in some way represent non-normative gender and sexuality. In other words, the narratives explored in Thai queer cinema go beyond heterosexual relationships and the male-female gender binary. The classification of this genre of Thai film as "queer" rather than LGBT, is used by film scholars, Brett Farmer, Oradol Kaewprasert, Karl Schoonover, and Rosalind Galt, in an effort to fully capture the range of Thai gender and sexuality, or phet (Thai: เพศ, RTGS: phet) portrayed in film which may not be accurately represented through Western LGBT terminology.

Thai language scholar, Monruedee Laphimon, defines phet as gendered desires, expressions, behaviors, and sexual activities within a spectrum of masculinity and femininity. Thai gender and sexuality scholar Peter A. Jackson coined the term "gendered sexuality" to discuss the lack of separation between the concepts of gender and sexuality in Thailand. Jackson argues that for this reason, while the use of some English LGBT terminology has been adopted in Thailand, the meaning carried by these terms is not the same as their Western counterparts. Film scholar, Brett Farmer, uses the term "vernacular queerness" to discuss how phet is represented in Thai queer cinema, highlighting how many films illustrate non-normative sexual desire and behavior but do not define the relationships nor the character's sexual identity.

Early Thai films that feature non-normative displays of gender or sexuality range from the 1920s to the 1970s. Most notably, the 1954 film Kathoey Pen Het was the first Thai movie to have an LGBTQ main character. However, the first major wave of Thai queer cinema occurred in the 1980s with films such as The Last Song (1985), Tortured Love (1987), and I Am a Man (1987) and continued through the post-1997 Thai Film Revival, also known as the new wave of Thai cinema. Since then, prominent film critic Kong Rithdee has noted that queer narratives have become central to Thai cinema. In addition, Lisa Daniels, an international film-festival director, has identified Thailand as one of the leading producers of queer cinema in the world.

Within the genre of Thai queer cinema exist many sub-genres in both independent and commercial films. The sports film sub-genre was one of the first Thai queer cinema sub-genres to garner commercial success during the new wave of Thai cinema. Sports films center storylines revolving around sports and prominent films in this sub-genre include The Iron Ladies (2000) and Beautiful Boxer (2003). Teen dramas, also called melodramas, are another popular sub-genre of queer cinema in Thailand that portray the non-normative relationship and gender expression of teenagers. Prominent queer teen drama films include Love of Siam (2007) and Yes or No (2010). Art-house films are another prominent sub-genre of Thai queer cinema. Art-house films like Tropical Malady (2004) and Supernatural (2014) have garnered critical success in the international film festival circuit. Thai film directors, Apichatpong Weerasethakul and Thunska Pansittivorakul, have been recognized both in Thailand and internationally as key figures in the Thai queer cinema genre.

== History ==
=== Early works ranging from the 1920s to the 1970s ===
Prior to The Last Song (1985), several Thai films were released between the 1920s and the 1970s that included queer characters. Sanchai Chotirosseranee, the deputy director of the Thai Film Archive, notes that the portrayal of "gender fluidity [and]..transgender character[s] existed decades before" the 1980s, although The Last Song tends to be thought of as the first due to how successful and well-known it was.

Films from this time period often situated LGBTQ characters as comedic figures, like as the protagonist's silly best friend. Other common tropes included portraying female characters as being confused about their sexuality until they meet the "right" man, or portraying queer people as evil, villainous figures.

==== 1920s ====
One early film worth mentioning is Trick Cinematograph (1927-30), which was created by Purachatra Jayakara, the Prince of Kamphaengphet. Using an experimental technique, the film alternates between men's heads on women's bodies and women's heads on men's bodies. Although not explicitly queer, Trick Cinematograph reveals an interest in gender fluidity and non-normative representations of different bodies.

==== Kathoey Pen Het (1954) ====
Thailand's first official LGBTQ film was Kathoey Pen Het, which was created in 1954 by the amateur film group Ledger. The film follows a beautiful woman who captures the attention of several different men, all of whom begin fighting over her. After a series of hijinks, by the end of the film it is revealed that she is a kathoey.

Although it is unlikely that the film was ever shown to anyone outside of the group, the movie's discovery in 1993 upended previous assumptions about the history of Thai queer media. As a result of its important status, the film was added to the Thai Ministry of Culture's register of cultural heritage in 2019.

==== 1950s-1970s ====
Aside from these two films, a number of other films were released between the 1950s and 70s that included queer characters. Researchers Sanchai Chotirosseranee and Atit Pongpanit tend to sort movies into three categories: those where kathoey characters are placed in comedic support roles, those that feature "gender crossing" plotlines, and those where queerness is associated with evilness.

===== Films with kathoey characters =====
Prominent examples of the former include Setthi Anatha (1955), also known as Poor Millionaire, which was the first Thai film to include a scene set in a kathoey bar. In the 1971 film Wiwah Pa Fun (TH: วิวาห์พาฝัน, lit. Dreamy Wedding/Marriage), not only was one of the kathoey supporting characters played by a famous actor, Suwin Swangrat, but another one of the characters was played by a real-life kathoey.

In a slate of other action films from the 1960s to 70s, several male main characters were identified as kathoeys. This is due to the fact that at the time, the word kathoey was used not only to describe queer people, but also those that behaved outside traditional gender norms, such as men with more effeminate characteristics.

Between the 1970s and 1984, the portrayal of kathoey characters gradually began to shift, as they began to take on new roles as the protagonist's best friend. Some of them also began to be associated with themes of modernity, urbanization, and Westernization. This shift coincided with the release of the The Last Song in 1985.

===== Films with cross-dressing or gender-fluid characters =====
Thai films with cross-dressing characters have existed since at least 1935, with the release of the movie Muang Mae Mai (lit. A Widow City). Oftentimes cross-dressing scenes served a comedic role in films.

A small number of films also featured portrayals of "crossing or blurring the gender normative line." Kung Nang (1975), for instance, features a female protagonist that identifies as male until she meets a boy that "puts an end to her gendered confusion and restores her normative-heterosexual femininity." Other films from this time period, such as Sawasdee Khun Khroo (1978) (lit. Good Morning, Teacher) and Wai Rean Pean Rak (1985) (lit. Crazy Love Student) featured similar endings, where the characters either revert back to "normal," or their non-normative understandings of gender are viewed as something that must "cured."

===== Films where queerness was associated with evilness =====
According to Sanchai Chotirosseranee and Atit Pongpanit, after the 1970s, an increasing number of Thai films began to depict LGBTQ characters in a negative light. This was likely due to a change in social attitudes starting in the 1960s, where queerness was perceived as representative of "social inappropriateness and mental illness."

Common throughlines included portraying LGBTQ characters as criminals, murderers, "deviant," or otherwise violent. Examples of films with such plotlines include Khon Kin Mia (1974) (lit. The Wife Eater), Hor Sao (1984) (TH: หอสาว, lit. Female Dormitory), and Khung Pad (1974) (TH: ขัง 8, lit. The Eight Prison). Sexual harassment was a particularly frequent plot element.

However, there were other films during this time that engaged in more complex understandings of queerness. The 1976 movie Thevada Derdin (lit. The Earth Angels), for instance, includes a drug-addicted kathoey character that turns to a life of crime due to the deeply unaccepting society that surrounds them.

Other Thai films, like Chong Wang Rawang Huajai (1976) (lit. The Gap Between Hearts), are also notable for how they are one of the first to depict scenes with graphic nudity and gay intimacy.

=== The first major wave of Thai queer cinema ===
Turning from the 1970s to the 80s, The Last Song (1985) marked the beginning of what Thai cinema scholar, Oradol Kaewprasert, calls the “first [major] wave of Thai queer cinema.” Other prominent movies that were part of this movement include Tortured Love (1987), the sequel to The Last Song, and I Am A Man (1987), a Thai remake of the American play The Boys in the Band (1968). This era of queer film was dominated by narratives that showed queer characters as people deserving sympathy from the audience and featured storylines dominated by stereotypes about the lives of queer people centering loss and depression, and often ending in the suicide of the queer character. Films in the first wave also often explicitly named “bad karma” as an explanation for the source of a character’s queerness. Thai cinema scholar, Oradol Kaewprasert, identified the following three films as the seminal films of the “first wave of Thai queer cinema.”

==== The Last Song (1985) (dir. Pisal Akkrasenee) ====
The Last Song (1985) was the first major Thai film to center a queer storyline and one of the first to feature a kathoey actress as the leading role in a film. The film garnered substantial commercial success and was a top earning film in the box office the year that it was released in theaters. The plot revolves around a kathoey cabaret performer, Somying, who falls in love with an aspiring singer who leaves her for a cisgender woman. The loss of the love of her life leads Somying to commit suicide on stage during her final cabaret performance. The film’s director, Pisal Akkrasenee, a heterosexual man, stated in an interview that he wanted The Last Song (1985) to capture the tragic experience of being kathoey in Thai society.

==== Tortured Love (1987) (dir. Pisal Akkrasenee) ====
Tortured Love (1987), is the sequel to the film The Last Song (1985) and was produced in large part due to the commercial success of its predecessor. However, Tortured Love (1987) did not end up being nearly as successful. The plot of the film revolves around Somying’s, who committed suicide at the end of The Last Song (1985), twin brother. The twin brother attempts to seek revenge on Somying’s former lover, Boonterm, for his role in Somying’s suicide, however, in the process Boonterm falls in love with Somying’s twin brother. The film ends with Boonterm deciding to reject all sexuality and become a monk.

==== I Am a Man (1987) (dir. Ml. Bandevanop Devakul) ====
I Am a Man (1987) is a Thai adaptation of the American play The Boys in the Band (1968) and was named one of the 100 essential Thai films by the National Film Archive of Thailand. The plot of the film is similar to that of the play from which it was adapted, in which the storyline revolves around a birthday party. Through the main character, Toey’s, birthday party, the film depicts varying representations of male queerness in the eight party guest who make up the films other principal characters.

=== New wave of Thai Cinema ===
The new wave of Thai cinema, identified by film scholars Mary J. Ainsley and Katarzyna Ancuta, began following the 1997 Asian Financial Crisis which led to an increase in Thai nationalism and idealization of Thai history and culture. This period marked a turning point for Thai cinema in that films began to reflect new realities and global influences. Beginning in 1997, the Thai film industry drastically increased in size, slowly becoming the largest film industry in the region. Director Nonzee Nimibutr's film Dang Bireley's and Young Gangsters released in 1997 is viewed by many film scholars as the first film in the new wave of Thai cinema. In 2000, the underdog sports film about a volleyball team made up Kathoey and gay players, The Iron Ladies, was released. The Iron Ladies is considered the first queer film of the new wave of Thai cinema and also a turning point for queer cinema in Thailand. The Iron Ladies (2000) lead to new genres of film and more positive representations of queer and kathoey individuals. The 2006 Thai coup d'etat that led to the ousting of Prime Minister Thaksin Shinawatra was another factor in the increased representation of queer individuals in Thai film. The new Thai government, installed after the coup, was more open and liberal than the previous culturally conservative government that was known for censoring films that did not represent a proper Thai morality.

== Sub-genres ==
=== Teen dramas ===
The teen drama sub-genre, sometimes called melodramas, depict non-heterosexual relationships between teens and young adults. This sub-genre of Thai Queer Cinema has become popular since the commercial success of the first Thai queer teen drama, Love of Siam, in 2007. Thai pop culture scholar, Amporn Jirattikorn, argues that the popularity of this film sub-genre with the heterosexual teen girl demographic has led to the production of many boys' love television dramas in Thailand. Notable queer teen dramas include Love of Siam (2007) and Yes or No (2010).

==== Love of Siam (2007) (dir. Chookiat Sakveerakul) ====
Love of Siam (Thai: รักแห่งสยาม, RTGS: Rak Haeng Sayam) is a film released in 2007. The plot of Love of Siam revolves around the story of Mew (Witwisit Hiranyawongkul) and Tong (Mario Maurer) childhood friends who go on to have a romantic relationship. Film scholar, Brett Farmer, uses the term "vernacular queerness" to discuss the relationships portrayed in the film; meaning, that while the film does not explicitly define the relationship between Mew and Tong as a gay relationship, it explores the possibilities of love outside of heterosexual relationships. Love of Siam was one of the first Thai films to portray a romantic relationship between two teenage boys and one of the first on-screen same-sex kisses. Film scholar, Brett Farmer, identified Love of Siam as one of the first examples of what he calls "independent commercial films," low budget films that have widespread commercial success and become top-grossing films at the box office.

=== Sports Films ===
Sports films are films where sports, either individual or team, are central to the film's narrative. Many times sports films feature an underdog narrative, where a character or group of characters who are presented as unlikely to achieve success overcome an obstacle and by the end of the film become successful in their endeavor. Film scholars, Karl Schoonover and Rosalind Galt, argue that by placing queer characters in sports films queerness can become the source of the underdog narrative. Sports films have become a popular sub-genre of Thai queer films through box-office record-breaking films including, The Iron Ladies (2000) and Beautiful Boxer (2004).

==== The Iron Ladies (2000) (dir. Yongyoot Thongkongtoon) ====
The Iron Ladies (Thai: สตรีเหล็ก; RTGS: Satree Lek) is a film released in 2000 that is based on the true story of a Thai volleyball team making it to the national championships four years prior in 1996 and marked the beginning of a new era of queer film making in Thailand. The film was the highest-grossing Thai film the year it was released and the second highest-grossing film in Thailand of all time. The plot of the film follows an underdog volleyball team composed of kathoey and feminine queer men who make it to the Thai national volleyball championships in the face of discrimination with the help of their lesbian coach. Film scholar, Serhat Unaldi, stated that The Iron Ladies (2000) is one of the first Thai films where kathoey and queer people are depicted positively and where community between queer people leads to character happiness and success. The plot of The Iron Ladies (2000) stands in contrast to previous films portraying kathoey characters which centered loss and elicited sympathy from the audience. Academic and film scholar, Brett Farmer, points to this film as a turning point for queer cinema in Thailand and as the beginning of the still very popular and commercial kathoey comedy genre of the Thai film industry.

=== Art-house ===
Art-house films are films that are usually independently produced and not intended for a mass market. The art-house film sub-genre is the most internationally critically acclaimed of any Thai queer cinema film genre with many films from this genre, including Tropical Malady (2004) and Supernatural (2014) being featured in international film festivals. Film scholar, Sophia Siddiqi, argues that some independent Thai filmmakers choose to make art-house films in order to include restricted explicit sexual content that is censored by the Thai government. All Thai films must be submitted to the Film Censorship Board, which is a part of the Ministry of Culture, before being distributed to commercial movie theaters.

==== Tropical Malady (2004) (dir. Apichatpong Weerasethakul) ====
Tropical Malady is a film released in 2004 and directed by Thai film director Apichatpong Weerasethakul. The film Tropical Malady (2004) is split into two separate narratives: the first half of the film is grounded in reality and focuses on the intimate relationship between two men in Northern Thailand and the second half shifts into an allegorical fantasy featuring a tiger in a forest, that draws on Thai folklore. Queer film scholars Karl Schoonover and Rosalind Galt, argue that through the shift from realism to fantasy just as the two male lead characters are about to kiss in front of a Thai flag, director Apichatpong Weerasethakul highlights the limitations of non-normative sexual desire in modern rural Northern Thailand. Schoonover and Galt also argue that the film is a dipthyc, meaning that the film consists of two parallel narratives that are "hinged" together and lead the audience to create a "third space" where the two film narratives are compared against each other. The film won the Jury Prize, or Prix du Jury, at the 2004 Cannes Film Festival.

==== Supernatural (2014) (dir. Thunska Pansittivorakul) ====
Supernatural is a film released in 2014 and is Thai film director, Thunska Pansittivorakul's, first full-length fiction film. The film Supernatural explores the parallels between the marginalization of Thai gay men and Burmese refugees in Thailand at the hands of the Thai nationalist state. Supernatural, a science fiction film set in a dystopian future, was in some part inspired by George Orwell's novel Nineteen Eighty-Four according to an interview with Pansittivorakul. Due to explicit scenes featuring queer eroticism the film was not distributed in mainstream movie theaters in Thailand, as explicit depictions of both heterosexual and same-sex sexual acts are censored by the Thai government. The film was instead released in the international film circuit.

== Key figures ==
=== Apichatpong Weerasethakul (born July 16, 1970) ===
Apichatpong Weerasethakul (อภิชาติพงศ์ วีระเศรษฐกุล; RTGS: Aphichatphong Wirasetthakun) is a Thai film director who was born in Bangkok, Thailand in 1970 and was raised in the rural northeastern province, Khon Kaen, Thailand. He studied architecture at Khon Kaen University graduating with a B.A. in 1994 and then studied film making at the Art Institute of Chicago, receiving a master’s degree in 1997. Weerasethakul began his career in directing experimental short films and documentary shorts. He founded his own production company in 1999, called Kick the Machine productions and began making full length films both documentary and fiction. Weerasethakul’s films are commonly classified as independent art-house cinema and have garnered global critical acclaim through international film festival screenings and awards. Weerasethakul, who is gay himself, is known to explore themes of sexuality, gender, religion, and politics through fantasy and allegory in his films. While the majority of his films lack clear definitions of LGBT identity, queer desire is often central to Weerasethakul’s film narratives. He is also known for drawing on his experiences growing up in rural Northern Thailand. Some notable Apichatpong Weerasethakul films include:

- The Adventures of Iron Pussy (2003)
- Tropical Malady (2004)
- Mekong Hotel (2012)

=== Thunska Pansittivorakul (born 1973) ===
Thunska Pansittivorakul (ธัญสกพันสิทธิวรกุล) is a Thai film director who was born in Bangkok, Thailand in 1973, and was raised near the Thailand-Malaysia border. He studied art education at Chulalongkorn University in Bangkok before beginning his filmmaking career. Through his films, Pansittivorakul, who is openly gay, commonly explores discrimination and oppression of expressions of gender, sexuality, and religion deemed not acceptable by the Thai State. He began his filmmaking career in documentary shorts with Private Life (2000) and founded his own production company called Sleep of Reason Films in 2012. Notable Pansittivorakul films include:

- Happy Berry (2004)
- This Area is Under Quarantine (2008)
- The Terrorist (2011)
- Supernatural (2014)

Pansittivorakul’s first full length documentary Happy Berry (2004), won the grand prize at the 4th Taiwan International Documentary Film Festival in 2004. Other notable and critically acclaimed full-length documentaries by Pansittivorakul include The Terrorist (2011) and This Area is Under Quarantine (2008). This Area is Under Quarantine (2008) explores religious and military tensions between Buddhists and Muslims in the south of Thailand through depictions of explicit queer sexual intimacy between a young couple, a buddhist boy and a muslim boy.

== List of Thai films with queer content ==
Below is a list of Thai films that in some way represent non-normative gender and sexuality.

A

- The Adventure of Iron Pussy (2003)
- After Sundown (2023)

B

- Bangkok Love Story (2007)
- Beautiful Boxer (2003)
- The Blue Hour (2015)
- Boyfriend (2016)

C

- Change (2014)
- Cheerleader Queens (2003)
- The Cheese Sisters (2022)
- Chong Wang Rawang Huajai (1976)
- Citizen Dog (2004)

D

- Down the River (2004)
- Driver (2017)

F

- Fathers (2016)
- Feel Good to Say Goodbye (2016)
- Flat Girls (2025)

G

- Ghost Station (2007)
- Golden Eagle (1970)
- Gray Secret (2015)

H

- Happy Berry (2004)
- Haunting Me (2007)
- Hor Sao (1984)
- How to Win at Checkers (Every Time) (2015)

I

- I Am a Man (1987)
- I Carried You Home (2012)
- The Iron Ladies (2000)
- It Gets Better (2012)
- iStories (2018)

J

- Jan Dara (2001)

K

- Kathoey Pen Het (1954)
- Khon Kin Mia (1974)
- Khung Pad (1974)
- Kung Fu Tootsie (2007)
- Kung Nang (1975)

L

- The Last Song (1985)
- 1448 Love Among Us (2014)
- Love Love You (2015)
- Love Next Door (2013)
- Love Next Door 2 (2015)
- Love of Siam (2007)
- Love's Coming (2014)

M

- Malila: The Farewell Flower (2017)
- Me... Myself (2007)
- Mekong Hotel (2012)
- Mercury Man (film) (2006)
- Metrosexual (film) (2006)
- Muang Mae Mai (1935)
- My Bromance (2014)

P

- The Paradise of Thorns (2024)
- Patong Girl (2014)
- Pleasure Factory (2007)
- Present Perfect (2017)

R

- The Red Envelope (2025)
- Right by Me (2005)
- The Right Man Because I Love You (2016)
- The Right Man – Christmas Gift (2016)

S

- Same Same Not the Same (2015)
- Saving Private Tootsie (2002)
- Sawasdee Khun Khroo (1978)
- Sayew (2003)
- Sense… Love (2016)
- Setthi Anatha (1955)
- Sick Nurses (2007)
- Sorry Saranghaeyo (2010)
- Supernatural (2014)

T

- The Terrorist (2011)
- Thevada Derdin (1976)
- This Area is Under Quarantine (2008)
- Tortured Love (1987)
- Trick Cinematograph (1927-30)
- Tropical Malady (2004)

U

- Uranus 2324 (2023)
- A Useful Ghost (2025)

W

- Wai Rean Pean Rak (1985)
- Water Boyy (2015)
- Wiwah Pa Fun (1971)

Y

- Yes or No (2010)
- Yes or No 2 (2012)
- Yes or No 2.5 (2015)
