= Sushar Manaying =

Thai actress and singer (born 1988)

- สุชาร์ มานะยิ่ง
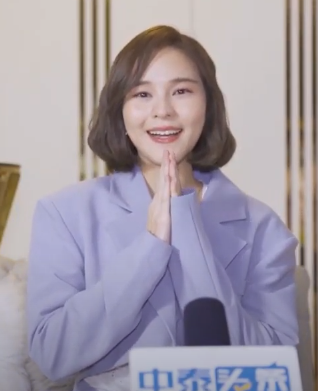
- Sushar in 2021
- Born: Sucha Manaying; January 9, 1988 (age 38); Phimai, Nakhon Ratchasima Province, Thailand
- Other names: Aom Sushar; Li Haina; Sucharat Manaying
- Years active: 2008–present
- Agents: Channel 3 (2015–2019); Freelance (2020–present)
- Notable work: Yes or No

Sushar Manaying (Thai: สุชาร์ มานะยิ่ง; RTGS: Sucha Manaying; IPA: [sù.t͡ɕʰa: ma:.ná.jîŋ]; born January 9, 1988) is a Thai actress and singer.

Sushar achieved widespread fame in Asia, especially China, for her leading role in the 2010 movie Yes or No.

== Names ==
She was born as Sucha (Thai: สุชา; IPA: [sù.t͡ɕʰa:]). She later changed the name to Sucharat (Thai: สุชารัตน์; IPA: [sù.t͡ɕʰa:.rát]) and to the present one, Sushar, respectively.

Her Thai nickname is Aom (Thai: ออม; RTGS: Om; IPA: [ʔɔːm]).

She is of Thai Chinese descent. Her Chinese name is Li Haina (Chinese: 李海娜; pinyin: Lǐ Hǎinà).

== Education ==
Sushar completed high school at Suranaree School in her hometown, Nakhon Ratchasima. She then studied performing arts at Srinakharinwirot University in Bangkok, from which she graduated with a second-class honours degree.

== Career ==
In 2010 and 2012, Sushar played as the leading character, Pie, in the Thai lesbian film, Yes or No and Yes or No 2, with Suppanad Jittaleela.

In 2013, she was given the role of Yoon or Choi Eun-suh (originally played by Song Hye-kyo) in the Thai remake of the Korean drama Autumn in My Heart, in which the male leading role was assumed by Jesdaporn Pholdee.

In 2014, she took the role of Han Ji-eun (originally played by Song Hye-kyo) in the Thai remake of the Korean drama Full House, in which she paired up with actor Pirat Nitipaisalkul professionally known as Mike Angelo.

In 2015, she and her Full House co-star Mike Angelo reunited in the Thai drama, Kiss Me, an adaptation of the Japanese manga Itazura na Kiss.

In 2017, she was given the role of Bai Ling in Chinese horror movie Haunted Road 2, in which she paired up with Chinese actor Leon Li Chuan. The movie is about the lovers from China went to Malaysia from assignment work of company but later find herself trapped in time perception.

== Filmography ==
=== Film ===
Year	Title	Role	Ref
2009	Pai in Love	Pai	
2010	Yes or No	Pie	
2012	Love, Faith, Miracle	Toei	
2012	Bangkok Kungfu	Bibi	
2012	Chop Kot Lai Chai Kot Loep	Mina Wongsathaphon (Min)	
2012	Yes or No 2	Pie	
2012	Love, Faith, Miracle II	Nam	
2013	Hashima Project	May	
2014	Present Perfect	Pam	
2014	Namaste, Hello, Bye Bye	Ploy	
2014	The Couple	Om	
2017	Haunted Road 2	Bai Ling	
2022	The Lake	Lin	

=== Television series ===
Year	Title	Role	Network
2008	Nangsao Phakhirio	Herself	Channel 3
2009	Kuan Kammathep	Mai	Channel 3
2010	Malai Sam Chai	Niece	Channel 5
2011	Dolphins Dream Fight	Faeng	Channel 9
2011–12	Mahachon the Series	Namfa	Channel 3
2012–15	Chut Nat Phop	Lela Wilaitham (Lay)	Channel 3
2013	Phon Phrom Onlaweng	Sutnapha (Miss Bi)	Channel 3
2013	Autumn in My Heart	Phitcha	True Asian Series
2014	Full House	Om-aem	True Asian Series
2014	Kiss Me	Keaw	Workpoint TV
2014	Club Friday the Series 4	Wa	GMM 25
2015	Kiss Me	Taliw	True Asian Series
2015	Raeng Tawan	Phensiri	Channel 3
2018	Nang Barb	Cameo	Channel 3
2018	Ruk Plik Lok	Naweeya	Channel 3
2019	Tukta Phee	Thanida	Channel 3
2019	Rainbow Town (哪裡有彩虹告訴我)	Lin Qiao Qiao	iQIYI
2021	Girl2K	Momay	GMM 25
2021	Mr. Lipstick	Mod / Kumarika	GMM 25
2021	Bangkok Breaking	Cat	Netflix
2021	Irresistible	Mook	GMM 25
2021	Boss & Me	Namkhing	GMM 25
2021	Switch On	Nisa	Channel 3
2021	XYZ	Chatra	True4U
2022	Finding The Rainbow	Fern	ViuTV
2023	Club Friday 15: Moments & Memories	Rinthan	One 31
2024	The Secret of Us		Channel 3

== Discography ==
=== Single ===
Year	Title
2014	"You" จากใจ ("From My Heart")

=== Original soundtracks ===
Year	Title	Note
2010	"Sop Ta" สบตา ("When Our Eyes Meet")	Yes or No OST
2012	"Khon Luem Cha" คนลืมช้า ("Someone Who Forgets Slowly")	Chop Kot Lai Chai Kot Loep OST
2012	"Forever Love" หวงห่วง ("Zealously Worried")	Yes or No 2 OST
2012	"My Rules"	Yes or No 2 OST
2012	"Chap Mue Chap Chai" จับมือจับใจ ("Touch My Hands, Touch My Heart")	Chinese TV program Pengyou (朋友) theme song
2013	"Yu Phuea Rak Thoe" อยู่เพื่อรักเธอ ("Be There to Love You")	Autumn in My Heart OST
2014	"Oh Baby I"	Full House OST
2014	"Yut" หยุด ("Stop")	The Couple OST
2015	"Phut Loi Loi" พูดลอยลอย ("A Casual Remark")	Chut Nat Phop OST
2015	"Kiss Me"	Playful Kiss OST
2016	"Raeng Tawan" แรงตะวัน ("The Burning Sun")	Raeng Tawan OST

== Awards and nominations ==
Year	Award	Category	Nominated work	Result	Ref
2010	10th Top Awards	Best Rising Film Actress	Yes or No	Nominated	
2012	12th Top Awards	Best Actress	Yes or No: Come Back to Me	Nominated	
2012	1st Daradaily the Great Awards	Film Actress of the Year	Yes or No: Come Back to Me	Nominated	
2012	10th Starpics Thai Film Awards	Best Actress	Yes or No: Come Back to Me	Nominated	
2012	21st Bangkok Critics Assembly Awards	Best Actress	Yes or No: Come Back to Me	Nominated	
2013	Gmember Awards	Best Movie Song of the Year	"Forever Love"	Won	
2013	Thailand Zocial Award	Most Popular Actress on Social Network	—N/a	Nominated	
2013	Bang Awards	Girl of the Year	—N/a	Nominated	
2013	TV3 Fanclub Awards	Popular Actress	Chaotic Destiny	Nominated	
2013	22nd Bangkok Critics Assembly Awards	Best Supporting Actress	Hashima Project	Nominated	
2014	3rd Daradaily the Great Awards	Best Actress of the Year	Hashima Project	Nominated	
2014	8th Kazz Awards	Current Girl Hit Award	—N/a	Nominated	
2014	8th Kazz Awards	Couple of the Year with Mike Angelo	Full House	Nominated	
2014	7th Siam Dara Star Awards	Best Actress in TV Drama	Full House	Nominated	
2014	13th Hamburger Awards	Best Cover Ever	—N/a	Won	
2014	9th OK! Awards	Female Heartthrob	—N/a	Nominated	
2014	2nd IME Chinese Online Media Popular Awards	Thailand Headlines Person of The Year	—N/a	Won	
2014	1st EFM Awards	Popular Star Award - March	Full House	Nominated	
2014	1st EFM Awards	Popular Star Award - November	The Couple	Nominated	
2014	Bioscope Awards	Best Acting	The Couple	Won	
2014	23rd Bangkok Critics Assembly Awards	Best Actress	The Couple	Won	
2014	12th Starpics Thai Film Awards	Best Actress	The Couple	Nominated	
2014	12th Kom Chad Luek Awards	Best Actress	The Couple	Nominated	
2015	3rd Thailand International Film Destination Festival	Honorable Award	—N/a	Won	
2015	Srinakharinwirot University	Outstanding Alumni Award	—N/a	Won	
2015	30th Saraswati Royal Award	Popular Female Actress	The Couple	Nominated	
2015	Maya Awards	Best Leading Actress (Film)	The Couple	Nominated	
2015	Maya Awards	Celebrity Couple of the Year with Mike Angelo	Kiss Me	Won	
2015	14th Hamburger Icon Awards	Best Buddy with Mike Angelo	Kiss Me	Won	
2015	2nd TrueLife Awards	Leading Actress of the Year	Kiss Me	Nominated	
2015	5th Daradaily The Great Awards	Best Film Actress of the Year	The Couple	Nominated	
