= Ma-Mha =

- The Thai movie poster.
- Directed by: Pantham Thongsang; Somkiet Vituranich
- Written by: Somkiet Vituranich
- Produced by: Naruemon Sutusanajinda; Pantham Thongsang
- Starring: Golf Pichaya; Pirachaya Pinmueng-nyam; Suthep Po-ngam
- Cinematography: Wardhana Vunchuplou
- Edited by: Karun Komanuwong
- Distributed by: NGR
- Release date: 5 April 2007
- Running time: 90 minutes
- Country: Thailand
- Language: Thai

Ma-Mha (Thai: มะหมา 4 ขาครับ, or Ma-Mha 4 Ka Krub, also Mid-Road Gang) is a 2007 Thai comedy-drama film directed by Pantham Thongsang and Somkiet Vituranich about a pack of stray dogs in suburban Bangkok who want to cross a busy highway in hopes of finding a better life on the other side of the road. It is the first Thai live-action feature film to feature main characters that are animals.

== Plot ==
Makham is a Thai Ridgeback living with his middle-class owner, the owner's girlfriend and her white Persian cat. After the cat tricks Makham into chewing on her owner's shoes, the girlfriend becomes furious. When her boyfriend is gone, she takes Makham to a suburban Bangkok Buddhist temple and abandons him.

Makham joins a pack of five stray dogs living in a burned-out neighborhood. An illustrated opening sequence shows the strays' lives and how their village was burned down. The pack is led by an old mixed breed hound named Luang Kaffee. The other dogs are mostly mixed breed as well, except for a poodle named Sexy. The dogs are starving. They cannot forage for food in the nearby temple because of a rival pack of strays. A neighboring orchard is off limits because of some fierce guard dogs. And there is a gated, high-class housing estate, but the dogs are stopped from entering by a kindly young security guard.

Makham manages to sneak his way into the estate anyway, and his eyes are captured by a female collie, Nam Kang. A rich neighbor is after Nam Kang's female owner, and brings in his own collie, Tommy, as a potential companion for Nam Kang to woo Nam Kang's owner. The man is angry with Makham because Makham had earlier disrupted a lavish birthday party. The man reveals himself as a cruel person, wanting to poison the strays or shoot them with a pistol.

Hope for the strays comes from Makham, who knows of a "Dogtopia", where all dogs are well fed and cared for. It is across a busy highway that no dog has survived the crossing. The older dog, Luang Kaffee, is injured in an initial attempt at crossing. So the strays pool their resources to try and cross the road. They find a wagon to pull Luang Kaffee in, and determine that on the full moon, there is a temple fair when traffic will be stopped and they can cross.

Eventually they do cross and find Dogtopia, where indeed they are cared for. Makham is reunited with his owner, who is at the fair. And all the dogs live happily ever after.

== Cast ==
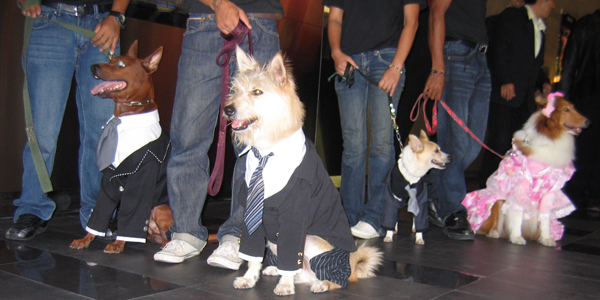
Animal cast of Ma-Mha attending the 2007 Bangkok International Film Festival.

- Golf Pichaya as Makham (voice)
- Pirachaya Pinmueng-nyam as Nam Kang (voice)
- Suthep Po-ngam as Luang Kaffee
- Sakawjai Punsawat as Sexy (voice)
- Maneerat Kham-uan as Pikul (voice)
- Christopher Wright as Tommy (voice)
- Chaleumpol Tikumpornteerawon as Security guard

== Production ==
Director Pantham Thongsang originally conceived of Ma-Mha as an animated film, but an experience with a trained dog during the making of his 2004 film, Ai-Fak, led him to believe he could make a live-action film with dogs. Further inspiration came from a call by King Bhumibol Adulyadej, himself a dog lover, for the police to adopt stray dogs and train them for police work.

The leading dog, a Thai Ridgeback, was found at a dog competition. Four other members of the starring stray dog pack were all found in dog shelters. A fifth dog, an aging, wounded stray mixed-breed, was spotted on the streets of Bangkok by Pantham and trained for the film.

Nearly one year was spent in pre-production, rehearsing with the dogs and training them for specific scenes, such as playing hide and seek, running makeshift agility courses, swimming and acting out emotional scenes.

Longer time was spent in actual shooting as well. The majority of Thai films are made in 30 days, but 100 days were spent making Ma-Mha.

The dogs speak, with the voiceover by human actors, but the animals' mouths do not move, as seen in Babe or Charlotte's Web. "We wanted to do it the old-fashioned way, which means we had to train the dogs harder and ask them to give us more," Pantham said in an interview.
