= H Project =

- Film poster
- Directed by: Piyapan Choopetch
- Written by: Adirek Wattaleela
- Starring: Alex Rendell; Apinya Sakuljaroensuk; Pirat Nitipaisalkul; Mek Mekwattana; Sucharat Manaying; Shô Nishino
- Distributed by: M39 Pictures
- Release dates: October 30, 2013 (Premiere); October 31, 2013 (Thailand)
- Running time: 118 minutes
- Country: Thailand
- Languages: Thai; Japanese

H Project, also Hashima Project or Project Hashima (Thai: ฮาชิมะ โปรเจกต์ ไม่เชื่อ ต้องลบหลู่), is a 2013 Thai horror film directed by Piyapan Choopetch.

== Synopsis ==
Five teenage students visit Hashima Island in Japan to film a paranormal TV program, because they do not believe the stories of this island. They find something that is trying to haunt them.

== Cast ==
Main cast

- Alex Rendell - Aof
- Apinya Sakuljaroensuk - Nan
- Pirat Nitipaisalkul - Nick
- Mek Mekwattana - Doc
- Sucharat Manaying - May

Supporting cast

- Shô Nishino - Ms. Miko
- Pattanapon Goonchorn Na Ayuthaya - Jo
- Bungo Satō - Mr. Satō
- Pongthep Anurat - Pub owner
- Nonzee Nimibutr - Himself (cameo)
