= Golf & Mike =

Thai pop duo

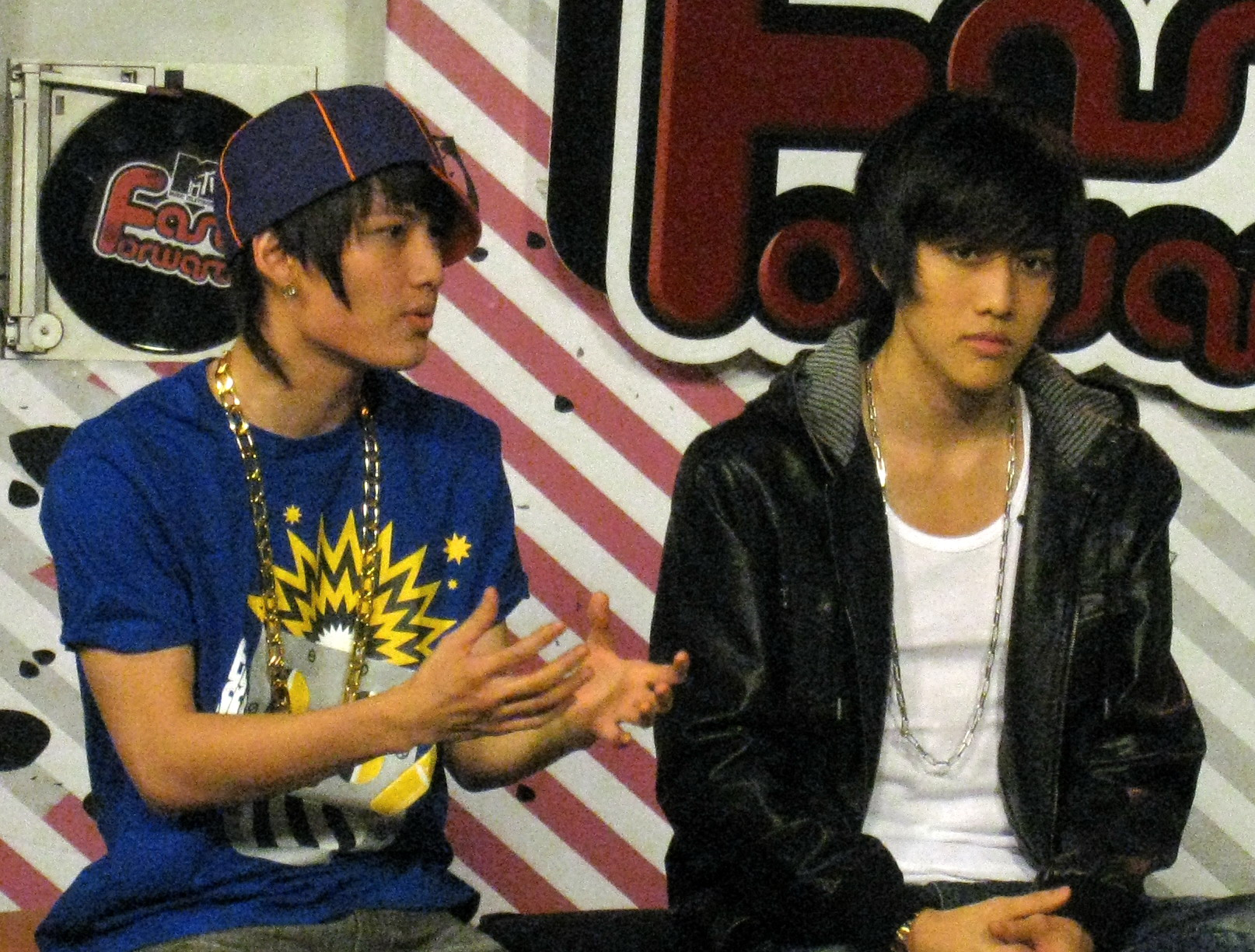
- Golf & Mike in 2009

Background information
- Also known as: GM, Golf–Mike
- Origin: Bangkok, Thailand
- Genres: Thai pop; J-pop; dance-pop; hip hop; R&B
- Years active: 2005–2010
- Label: GMM Grammy
- Members: Golf Pichaya; Mike Angelo
- Website: golfmike.gmember.com

Golf & Mike, more often credited in Thailand as Golf-Mike (Thai: กอล์ฟ-ไมค์), were a Thai pop duo artist consisting of brothers Pichaya "Golf" Nitipaisalkul and Pirat "Mike" Nitipaisalkul, formed under Thailand's biggest entertainment company, GMM Grammy. They debuted in 2005, known for their pop tunes and performances.

== Members ==
Name	Birth name	Height	Birthday
Golf (กอล์ฟ)	Pichaya Nitipaisalkul (พิชญะ นิธิไพศาลกุล)	175 cm (5 ft 9 in)	February 20, 1987 (age 39)
Mike Angelo (ไมค์)	Pirat Nitipaisalkul (พิรัชต์ นิธิไพศาลกุล)	180 cm (5 ft 11 in)	December 19, 1989 (age 36)

== History ==
=== 2002–2005: Pre-debut activities ===
In 2002, the two Nitipaisalkul brothers were auditioned into the 1st generation of G-Junior, a training project by GMM Grammy, Thailand's largest entertainment company. As trainees, Golf & Mike were trained in singing, dancing, acting, and language and they made an appearance at many GMM Grammy concerts. Golf & Mike along with other G-Juniors joined J-Asean Pops Concert 2003 (October 10) where the concert featured Johnny's Entertainment artists, Hideaki Takizawa, Jimmy, KAT-TUN, Ya-Ya-Yah, A.B.C, & Five. The G-Juniors also performed consecutively at Pattaya Music Festival in 2003 & 2004 (all featured Johnny's artists). From these concerts, Golf, Mike and other G-Juniors were spotted by Johnny's crews and later were invited to join the Thai-J Pop Concert in 2004 (Tackey & Tsubasa, KAT-TUN & A.B.C).

In 2004, Golf & Mike issued their first Thai concert performance as an opening act to Bird Thongchai McIntyre's For Fan Fun Fair Concert. The two boys with B-boy dancing at the middle of the stage started to gain their own fanclub. At the end of 2004, Golf & Mike were invited to join NEWS concert at Tokyo International Forum as special guests and early 2005 they were invited again in Ya-Ya-Yah concert in 2005. Golf & Mike performed "Epilogue" at these concerts and were called Thai Junior by Japanese press at the time.

=== 2005: Debut ===
It took 4 years before the Nitipaisalkul brothers finally debuted as Golf-Mike in October 2005 with their self-titled album, Golf-Mike. Dance-pop track "Bounce" was chosen to be the album's first promotional single, and it became a big hit in Thailand. The other tracks, "Ruang Lek Kaung Tur", "Ta Lok Dee", "Yah Len Bab Nee," and "Epilogue" were also widely accepted in the industry. It's noted that "Epilogue", a cover of Tackey & Tsubasa hits, was given as a present from Johnny Kitagawa for their debut album.

Golf & Mike's first album became a blast in the Thai music industry as their first nomination was the Most Popular Artist for the Year award for the Seed Awards 2006, which they also won in February 2006. In March, they were able to hold their first solo concert, Golf-Mike Let's Bounce Concert at Thunder Dome with an audience of 5,000 people.

=== 2006: Special units in Japan and Thailand ===
In June 2006, Golf & Mike were awarded Best Breakthrough Artist from the Channel [V] Thailand Music Video Awards 2006. Later that month, they showed up in Japan forming Johnny's Entertainment's first ever international unit, Kitty GYM along with popular J-pop figure, Tomohisa Yamashita. "GYM", stands for Golf, Yamashita and Mike, respectively with "Kitty" standing for the 4 Johnny's Jrs, Hiromitsu Kitayama (Kis-my-ft2), Kei Inoo (J.J. Express, later Hey! Say! JUMP), Shota Totsuka (A.B.C.), and Hikaru Yaotome (Ya-Ya-Yah, later Hey! Say! JUMP). GYM released one single, "Fever to Future" (フィーバーとフューチャー) as an official supporter of the Women's Volleyball World Grandprix. The single ranked No. 1 on the Oricon chart. Golf & Mike also performed in 25 rounds of Johnny's Jr no Daibouken Concert.

At the end of August, Golf & Mike teamed up with other G-Juniors including Chin, Guy, Happy, Madiow, J, Nut, Ken, and Ice as a group called "G-JR" (read as G-J-R) releasing an album, 10 Club.

On October 7, G-JR held a concert again called The Show Must Go on Concert By Golf-Mike & Friends at Impact Arena. The concert was first meant to be the Thai-J Pop Concert with Arashi & Golf-Mike but Arashi had to cancel its participation due to politic occurrences in Thailand at the time. At the end of the month, G-JR won a Virgin Hitz Award 2006 for Popular Vote New Band.

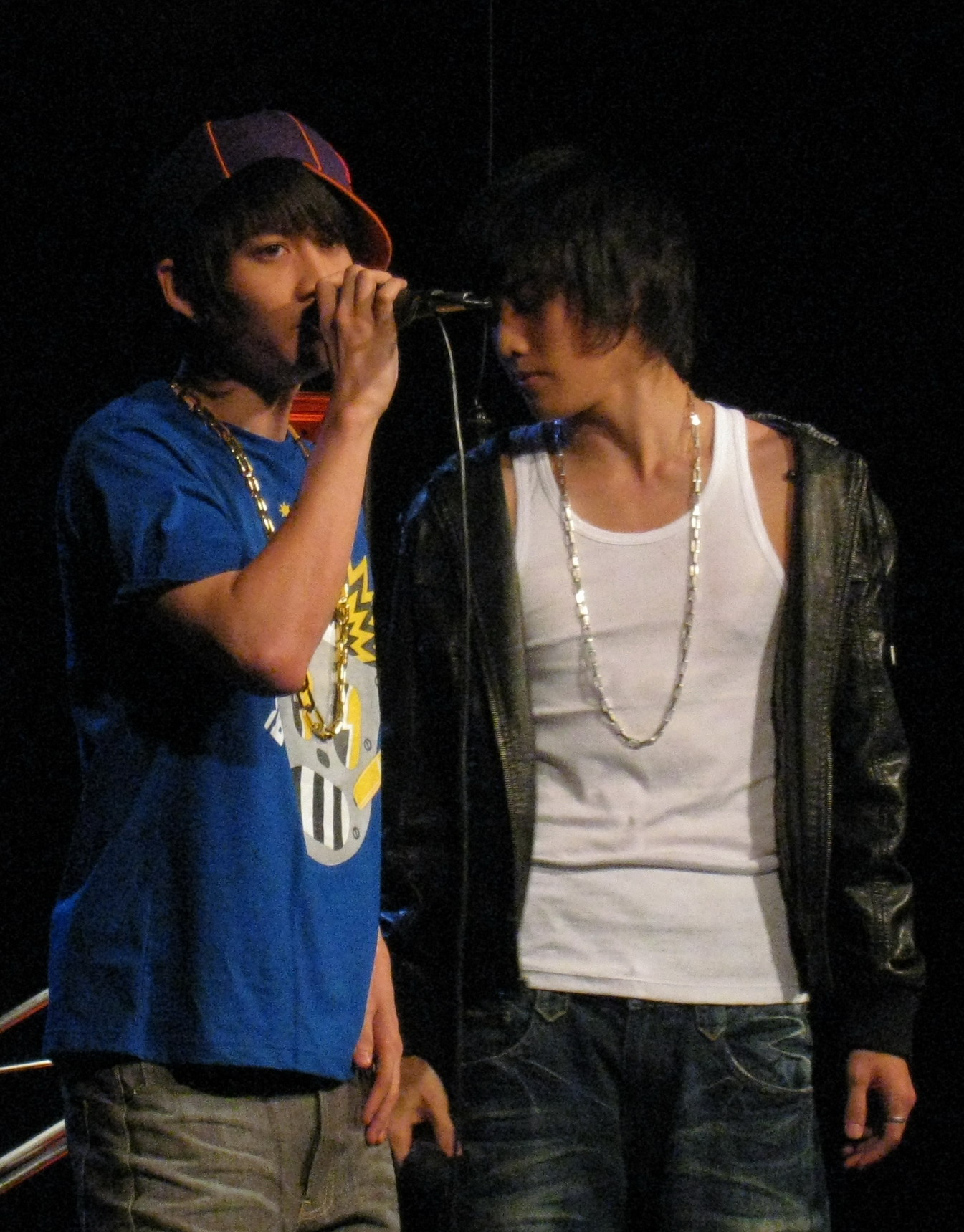
Golf & Mike performing on MTV Fast Forward in 2009

After finishing the promotion for their album 10 Club, Golf & Mike got back to the studios and started working on their second full-length album. By the end of 2006, Golf & Mike decided to release a special album 365 Days With Golf-Mike, This special album included a hit song, Kaub Koon Young Noi Pai and released second album on November 11, 2006.

=== 2006–2007: One By One and Overseas albums ===
They promoted the special album and worked in the studio for the second album until November 11, 2006, when their second album, One By One, officially launched to the stores. The first music video for the album, "Fight For You," took them three whole days to practice for Free-Running. Golf took his first step in song writing for the lyrics of "Sexy Girl".

On March 13, Golf-Mike was voted by Thailand's Entertainment Reporter Association in the Star Entertainment Awards 2007 as the "Best Group".

In June 2007, they released their first Japanese debut single, "Nippon Ai Ni Ikuyo". Two months later they released their debut Japanese album RIN under Johnny's Entertainment production.

In September 2007, Golf & Mike were invited to perform at the Asia Song Festival 2007 in Korea. Along with this introduction, they released the Korea edition of their One By One album under SM Entertainment.

=== 2008: Get Ready and TV drama debut ===
Both Golf and Mike have taken the leading roles in a Thai series called Ubat Ruk Kaam Kaub Fah (Love Beyond Frontier) (directed and screen-written by Ping Lampraplerng) that was broadcast on Modern 9 TV in Thailand during the year 2008, and was later followed by a sequel "Ubat Ruk Kaam Kaub Fah 2."

In late 2008, the brother duo made their moves into Chinese music market by doing their first promo in Malaysia and launched their greatest hits album, Inspiration Greatest Hits.

In December 2008, Golf & Mike released the awaited third album, GET R3ADY featuring the collaboration song Let's Get Down with Khan Thaitanium. Their interests in song writing were fulfilled in this album as Golf wrote and produced a song called "My Superstar" and Mike wrote a song called "You" which became a big hit.

=== 2009: The 1st National Tour and International Appearances ===
In May 2009, brother duo Golf & Mike released their first-ever Chinese album in Malaysia entitled "Get Ready 2", including 2 Chinese tracks, 同班同學 (meaning Classmate) and Inspiration.

Golf Mike and Ice Saranyu from GMM Grammy held their first concert in Tokyo, Japan on July 11, 2009, entitled Golf, Mike, Ice Thai Shiki Concert.

From October to November 2009, Golf Mike held their first-ever national concert tour around Thailand in 9 provinces, entitled The Closer Golf Mike National Tour Concert By Puriku. Their last concert of the tour was in Bangkok. To support the tour, Golf & Mike wrote & produced their very own song, "Let's Stay Together" and sang it as the closing song of this tour.

They were working in collaboration with the Korean duo Mighty Mouth to release an album that is to be sold in Thailand and Korea and has performed the song "No Matter" for the Star Stage TV program on the 29th of November 2009.

=== 2010: New project ===
Golf & Mike began the year with superb Michael Jackson dances at This Is It The Concert on February 20–21, the official tribute concert to Michael Jackson held collaboratively by Sony Music (Thailand) and GMM Grammy. Golf & Mike had been known for being avid fans of Michael Jackson delivered acclaimed "Smooth Criminal" performances and also were joined by Chin, also former G-Junior, Peck Palitchoke and Dan Worrawet in the songs, "Billie Jean" and "Beat It".

Golf & Mike still remained commercial favourite stars as they opened the year with 2 new commercials including Fino with Super Junior members and Singto and then also endorsed Puriku Sicily Lemon.

By March 2010, Golf & Mike mentioned their next project of this year as a disclosed big surprise, rumored that they were going to take dance class in the USA before coming back with their 4th album.

They disbanded later and become solo singers.

=== 2011: Solo album ===
On February 1, 2011, Golf officially released his new solo single titled "Take Me to Ur Bed".

On March 1, 2011, Mike (D. Angelo) officially released his new solo single, "Ayo".

== Discography ==
=== Studio albums ===
Album	Album details	Artist	Track listing
Golf+Mike	Released: 15 November 2005; Language: Thai; Formats: CD	Golf & Mike	Bounce; Your Little Matter (Ruang Lek Khong Ther); Busy Dancing (Mai Waang Kam-lang Ten); Yaa Len Baeb Nii; Just Say Hi...Don't Say Bye; Khae Khrang Diaw; Moshi Moshi; Ta-lok Dii; Hua Jai Ja Waai; Thii Las-nid; Epilogue
One by One	Released: 14 November 2006; 14 September 2007 (Korean version): Language: Thai, Korean; Formats: CD	Golf & Mike	Fight For You; Mai tong bork laew wah ter ruk chun : ไม่ต้องบอกแล้วว่าเธอรักฉัน; Sood tuar (OST - Mah mhar see khar krub on 5 April 2007) : สุดตัว; Sexy Girl; Seng : เซ็ง; Let's Get Up; Tee pruek sar : ที่ปรึกษา; Peang sob tar (OST - Mah mhar see khar krub on 5 April 2007) : เพียงสบตา; Mai tarm krai : ไม่ตามใคร; Virgin; In Ya Hand; Korean version: Fight For You; Don't You Love Me ( 날 사랑한다고 하지마); Firmly (힘껏); Sexy Girl; Make No Sense (말도 안돼); Let's Get Up; Consultation Station (상담역); I'm Different With Other People (난 다른 사람과 달라); Virgin; In Ya Hand; Fight For You (한국어); Thanks to (한국어)
RIN (凛)	Released: 22 August 2007; Language: Japanese, Thai; Formats: CD	Golf & Mike	凛々SAMURAI; ニッポン アイニイクヨ; Fight For You (タイ語); サヨナラ純情; 恋のトゲ; 恋人; おかしいでしょ?; 僕の場所; こころがわり; 好きだから; 初恋のアリア; 暑かった夏休み; フィーバーとフューチャー (タイ語ver.); Kae Krang Deaw
GET R3ADY	Released: 12 December 2008; Language: Thai; Formats: CD	Golf & Mike	Let's Get Down; ยิ่งรักยิ่งเจ็บ Ying Ruk Ying Jeb; คว้าลม Kwah Lom; ไม่พอดี ไม่ดีพอ Mai Paw Dee Mai Dee Paw; Inspiration; You; ขุมทรัพย์สุดขอบฟ้า (โฆษณาชาเขียว) Koom Sup Soot Kaub Far; อยู่ไหนก็ไม่เหงา Yoo Nai Gaw Mai Ngow; จะไปส่งให้ถึงมือ Ja Pai Song Hai Teung Meu; My Super Star; ยิ่งรักยิ่งเจ็บ (special version) Ying Ruk Ying Jeb (special version)

=== Special albums ===
Album	Album details	Artist	Track listing
10 Club	Released: 20.08.2006; Language: Thai; Formats: CD; Publisher: GMM Grammy	G-JR (A collaboration with other G-Junior artists)	Show Time; Krub krub : ครับ ครับ; Happy Birthday; Aow pai luey Aow pai luey : เอาไปเลย เอาไปเลย; Poo chai mai pen puean kub poo ying : ผู้ชายไม่เป็นเพื่อนกับผู้หญิง; Khon mai naruk : คนไม่น่ารัก; Just Do It Again; Diew kor chao : เดี๋ยวก็เช้า; Bah palang : บ้าพลัง; Take care na : Take care นะ
365 Days With Golf-Mike	Released: 20.12.2006; Language: Thai; Formats: CD; Publisher: GMM Grammy	Golf & Mike	Disc 1 : Audio CD: Korb kun yung noi pai : ขอบคุณ...ยังน้อยไป; Ten gun mhai : เต้นกันไหม; Kon kon diew gun (new version) : คนๆ เดียวกัน (new version); Happy birthday (new version); Poochai mai pen puen gub pooying (new version) : ผู้ชายไม่เป็นเพื่อนกับผู้หญิง (new version); Disc 2 : Karaoke VCD (with English subtitles): Korb kun yung noi pai : ขอบคุณ...ยังน้อยไป; Ten gun mhai : เต้นกันไหม; Kon kon diew gun (new version) : คนๆ เดียวกัน (new version); Bounce; Talok dee : ตลกดี; Rueng lek khong ter : เรื่องเล็กของเธอ; Yah len baeb née : อย่าเล่นแบบนี้; Happy birthday (new version); Poochai mai pen puen gub pooying (new version) : ผู้ชายไม่เป็นเพื่อนกับผู้หญิง (new version); Bonus tracks: Scoop : 1 year in the music industry (1 ปี ของการเดินทางในเส้นทางดนตรี); One day with Golf & Mike (life style); Exclusive photos
GET R3ADY 2 (Malaysia edition)	Released: 2009; Language: Chinese; Formats: CD; Publisher: GMM Grammy	Golf & Mike	

=== OST ===
Album	Album details	Artist	Track listing
Mid Phid Chai Mhai Tee Ruk Ter (Love Beyond Frontier)	Released: 27.05.2009; Language: Formats: CD	Golf & Mike	Mid phid chai mhai tee ruk ter; Khor pieng jai rao mee gun; Kid thueng; Klai tao rai ruk tao gun; Love; Ying ruk ying jeb; Mai por dee mai dee por; Jah pai song hai thueng mue

=== Compilations ===
- 2007: Golf Mike Music Box Collection
- 2008: Inspiration Greatest Hits (Malaysia edition)
- 2008: Golf-Mike: Diary Hits

=== Singles/non-album tracks ===
- 2005: Tong Ther Tao Nun (I'll Never Live Without You)
- 2005: Kon Kon Deaw Kun
- 2006: Fever to Future (フィーバーとフューチャー) - GYM
- 2007: Nippon Ainiikuyo (ニッポンアイニイクヨ)
- 2009: Let's Stay Together
- 2010: Brighter Day (Klear featuring Golf Pichaya)
- 2011: AYO (1st Solo Album of Mike)
- 2012: ละเลย (1st Solo Album of Mike)
- 2013: สดุดีมหาราชา - Golf (Various Artist)
- 2013: เพียงชายคนนี้ ไม่ใช่ผู้วิเศษ - Mike (ไมค์ พิรัชต์) (Ost.รากบุญ)
- 2013: ลูกไม้ของพ่อ - Golf Pichaya (เพลงประกอบละคร ลูกหนี้ที่รัก)
- 2013: Break You Off Tonight - Mike D.Angelo (ไมค์ พิรัชต์) (Ost. Full House วุ่นนัก รักเต็มบ้าน)
- 2013: Oh Baby I - Mike D.Angelo (ไมค์ พิรัชต์) feat.ออม สุชาร์ (Ost. Full House วุ่นนัก รักเต็มบ้าน)
- 2013: FUNK ME (ฟังฉัน) - Golf Pichaya
- 2014: ให้ฉันได้เป็นผู้ชายที่จะรักเธอ - Mike D.Angelo (ไมค์ พิรัชต์) (Ost.Full House วุ่นนัก รักเต็มบ้าน)
- 2014: Wrong พื้นผิดเบอร์ - Golf Pichaya
- 2014: จากนี้ - Mike (ไมค์ พิรัชต์) (ost.รากบุญ ตอน รอยรักแรงมาร)
- 2014: ได้แต่คิดถึง - Mike (ไมค์ พิรัชต์) (ost. มายานางฟ้า)
- 2014: New Beginning - Mike D. Angelo
- 2015: Take You to the Moon - Mike D. Angelo
- 2015: Kiss Me - Mike D.Angelo (ไมค์ พิรัชต์) feat.ออม สุชาร์ (Ost. Kiss Me)
- 2017: 遥远的承诺 solo version (Ost. Delicious Destiny) - Mike D. Angelo
- 2017: Together Forever (Ost. Mr. Swimmer) - Mike D. Angelo
- 2018: Speechless - Mike Angelo
- 2018: 你在我心中 - Mike Angelo
- 2018: We were dancing - Mike Angelo
- 2018: 和我跳舞 - Mike Angelo
- 2018: Love Battle - Mike Angelo
- 2018: Everyday (Ost. Mr. Swimmer)- Mike Angelo

=== DVDs/VCDs/live Concert ===
- 2006: Let's Bounce Concert
- 2006: The Show Must Go On Concert by Golf-Mike & Friends
- 2007: One By One Concert
- 2008: Golf Mike Get Ready Concert
- 2009: "Variety Live Concert by Ice Sarunyu รวมมิตรใส่น้ำแข็ง" (guest)
- 2009: The Closer Golf-Mike National Tour Concert
- 2010: "This Is It The Concert"
- 2011: "20 Years Christina Aguilar Concert" (Golf solo) (guest)
- 2012: "1nvasion Exclusive Party" (Golf's Mini Concert)
- 2013: "3 ทหารเสือสาว Limited Edition Live Show" (Mike solo) (guest)
- 2013: "Bee Peerapat Natural Born Singer Concert" (Golf solo) (guest)
- 2014: "2014 Top Chinese Music Awards" in China (Mike solo) (guest)
- 2014: "Waterzonic electronic Music-Water Festival" (Mike solo) (guest)
- 2015: "Ku Music Asian Music Awards" in China (Mike solo) (guest)
- 2016: "Ku Music Asian Music Awards" in China (Mike solo) (guest)
- 2018: "The Opening Ceremony of The 4th Annual International Jackie Chan Action Movie Week" in China (Mike solo) (guest)
- 2019: “Star Action 2020 Starry Summit Ceremony" in China (Mike solo) (guest)

=== Photobooks ===
Golf & Mike have released 3 official photobooks. All published by GMM Grammy's subsidiary, 'In Publishing'.

- 2006: Unseen Golf-Mike
- 2006: Golf-Mike The Backstage Show
- 2009: Golf & Mike Live Photograph
- 2014: Mike D. Angelo THE FIRST BREAKOUT

== Filmography ==
Film
Year	Film	Role Golf	Role Mike	Label
2007	Mid-Road Gang มะหมา 4 ขาครับ	Makham (voice) มะขาม	–	Main protagonist
2010	Chua Fah Din Sa Rai ชั่วฟ้าดินสลาย	–	ambassador ทูตจากต่างแดน	Sahamongkon Film
2013	Hashima Project ฮาชิมะ โปรเจคต์ ไม่เชื่อต้องลบหลู่	–	Nick นิก	M39Studios
2014	Tai Hong Tai Hian ตายโหง ตายเฮี้ยน	Non นนท์	–	PanakornFilm
2015	Surprise ภาพยนตร์จีน	-	Zhū Bājiè ตือโป๊ยก่าย	
2017	Mr. Pride vs Miss Prejudice ภาพยนตร์จีน	-	Jiang Hai	
2021	The Misfits	-	Wick	The Avenue Entertainment
Television series (Lakorn)
Year	Title	Role Golf	Role Mike	Channel
2008	Love Beyond Frontier อุบัติรักข้ามขอบฟ้า	Golf กอล์ฟ	Mike ไมค์	Modern 9 TV
2009	Love Beyond Frontier 2 อุบัติรักข้ามขอบฟ้า 2	Golf กอล์ฟ	Mike ไมค์	Modern 9 TV
2012	Likit Fah Chata Din ลิขิตฟ้าชะตาดิน	-	Din ดิน	5
2012	ระเบิดเที่ยงแถวตรง	Din Puen ดินปืน	-	5
2012	Rak Boon รากบุญ	-	Lapin ลาภิณ	3
2013	วุ่นนักรักหรือหลอก	Nucha นุชา	-	5
2013	ระเบิดเที่ยงแถวตรง	Din Puen ดินปืน	-	5
2013	ลูกหนี้ที่รัก	Kong Phop ก้องภพ	-	3
2014	Full House วุ่นนักรักเต็มบ้าน	-	Mike D. Angelo	True Asian Series
2014	Maya Nangfah มายานางฟ้า	-	Ramael รามิล	True10
2014	Rak Boon 2 รากบุญ 2 รอยรักแรงมาร	-	Lapin ลาภิณ	3
2014	รอยฝันตะวันเดือด	Yuji Kobayashi ยูจิ โคบายาชิ	-	3
2015	Hua Jai Patapee หัวใจปฐพี	-	Purich ภูริช	3
2015	Kiss Me; Kiss Me รักล้นใจนายแกล้งจุ๊บ	-	Tenten เท็นเท็น	3
2015	Wu Xin: The Monster Killer อู๋ซิน จอมขมังเวทย์	-	Bai Liu Li ไป๋หลิวหลี่	Sohu TV
2016	Legend of Nine Tails Fox ตำนานรักจิ้งจอกสวรรค์	-	Hu Si หูซื่อ	Hunan TV
2016	My Little Princess ติวหัวใจยัยเจ้าหญิง	-	Jiang Nian Yu เจียงเนี่ยนอวี๋	Sohu TV
2017	Little Valentine 黄金剧场:小情人	-	Gong Yan	Shenzhen TV
2017	Wu Xin: The Monster Killer 2 อู๋ซิน จอมขมังเวทย์ 2	-	Bai Liu Li ไป๋หลิวหลี่	Sohu TV
2017	Delicious Destiny 美味奇缘 หนุ่มหน้าใส หัวใจนักปรุง	-	Li Yuzhe หลีอวี่เจ๋อ	Hunan TV
2018	Mr. Swimmer 游泳先生 หวานใจของนายฉลาม ศึกวัดใจนายฉลาม	-	Bai Yongze ไป๋หย่งเจ๋อ	Mango TV
2019	My Amazing Boyfriend 2 แฟนฉันมหัศจรรย์ทะลุมิติ 2	-	Xue Ling Qiao เซวียหลิงเฉียว	Mango TV
The Musical
Year	Title	Role Golf	Role Mike	Place
2011	Love You Forever The Musical รักเธอเสมอ เดอะมิวสิคเคิล	Karn กานต์	-	Thailand Cultural Center
2013	For Friend For Dream in Honor Day เพื่อเพื่อน เพื่อฝัน วันเกียรติยศ	Tae เต้	-	Impact Arena Muang Thong Thani

== Commercials ==
- 2006: 12Plus Cutie, facial powder
- 2006: YAMAHA FINO, motorcycle
- 2007: iKeyclub.com
- 2007: True Corporation
- 2007: Save The World
- 2007: My Style My Fino, motorcycle
- 2008: Puriku, fruit white tea
- 2008: i-mobile 625
- 2008: i-mobile TV 626
- 2008: Yamaha New Fino 2008, motorcycle with Korean boy-band Super Junior
- 2009: Puriku Cool
- 2009: Citra, Body Lotion
- 2009: My Fino ... My Experience, motorcycle with Korean boy-band Super Junior
- 2010: Amazing Fino
- 2010: Puriku Sicily Lemon
- 2010: Puriku goji berry {with Aum patchaapa}
- 2011: Mike-Sumsung Refrigerator
- 2012: Mike-Est Cola
- 2013: Mike-Swensen's Ice Cream
- 2014: Mike-Corolla Altis ESport
- 2015: Mike-Corolla Altis ESport Nurburgring Edition
- 2016: Mike-Corolla Altis ESport and ESport nürburgring Edition
- 2018: Mike-Mistine in China
- 2021: Mike-MANSOME Vitamins Water

== Awards and nominations ==
Year	Nominee / work	Award	Result
2005	Golf & Mike	Seed "Most Popular Artist of the Year"	Won
2006	Golf & Mike	Seed "Most Popular Artist of the Year"	Nominated
2006	Golf & Mike	Channel V "Favorite Breakthrough Artist"	Won
2006	Golf & Mike	Channel V "Best Song" – Ruang Lek Kaung Tur	Nominated
2006	G-JR G-Juniors (Golf & Mike, Chin, Guy, Happy, Madiow, J, Nut, Ken, and Ice)	Virgin Hitz "Popular Vote New Band"	Won
2007	Golf & Mike	Asia Song Festival 2007 "Best Asian Artist Award" / Appreciation plaque from the Minister of Culture & Tourism in Korea	Won
2007	Golf & Mike	Seventeen Magazine "Popular Group Artist"	Won
2007	Golf & Mike	Virgin Hitz "Most Popular Group Artist of the Year"	Won
2007	Golf & Mike	Virgin Hitz "Most Popular Song of the Year" - ที่ปรึกษา"	Won
2008	Golf & Mike	Korean Ambassador Award	Won
2008	Golf & Mike	Audition Music Award "Best Band"	
2008	Golf & Mike	Sudsapda Young & Smart Vote "Young & Smart Band"	
2008	Golf & Mike	Seed "Most Popular Artist of the Year"	Won
2009	Golf & Mike	Top Awards 2008 "Best Group Artist"	
2009	Golf & Mike	TV Inside Hot Awards	
2009	Golf & Mike	Seventeen Magazine Choice Award "Seventeen Music Group Artist"	
2009	Golf & Mike	Virgin Greetz Awards: Greetz Hair	
2010	Golf & Mike	Top Awards 2009 "Best Group Artist"	
2011	Golf	Music Library "Song of The Year" - I Can't Breathe	
2012	Golf	Music Library Pioneer "Artist of The Year"	
2012	Mike	ลิขิตฟ้าชะตาดิน (Translation: Fated Heaven Fortune and Earth)	
2013	Mike	2013: The Great Awards "Best Rising Male Star 2012" - Raak Boon drama	
2013	Golf & Mike	100 Most Spicy Idols 2013	
2013	Mike	Mekkala Awards "Best Leading Male Star 2012"- ลิขิตฟ้าชะตาดิน (Translation: Fated Heaven Fortune and Earth)	
2013	Mike	Rakangthong Award "People of the Year Award"	Won
2014	Mike	The Best International OTP Cover of Hamburger Magazine	Won
2014	Mike	Thailand Weibo Night 2014 & Thailand Headlines Person of The Year Award "The Leading Actor of Famous Thai TV Series"	Won
2015	Mike	Honorable awards in Thailand International Film Destination Festival 2015	Won
2015	Mike	The outstanding filial piety award on National Mother Day 2015	Won
2015	Mike	MAYA Awards "OTP"	Won
2015	Mike	Hamburger Awards "Best Buddy"	Won
2015	Mike	KU Music Awards 2015: The Hot Search Artist of Chart	Won
2016	Mike	KU Music Awards 2016: The Most Popular Annual Crossover Artist	Won
2017	Mike	COSMO Beauty Awards 2017	Won
2018	Mike	Chic style Awards 2018: Icon of the year	Won
2018	Mike	Foreign Artist of the Year award from Sina Weibo in China	Won
2018	Mike	International Fashion Artist of the Year award from UNO X Young in China	Won
2018	Mike	Most Popular Overseas Artist of the Year award from DoNews in China	Won
2019	Mike	FEIA Awards 2019: Most Popular Foreign Artist award from JSTYLE in China	Won
2019	Mike	Best International Star award from DIAFA in Dubai	Won
2019	Mike	Weibo Popular Actor award from Weibo Starlight Awards in Hong Kong	Won
2019	Mike	Overseas Outstanding All-Around Artist Award of Asia New Song List 2019 - Fresh Asia! in China	Won

== Variety show/game show ==
=== Golf ===
- 2015 "Find The Wasabi Season 2" Norika's Hunters
- 2016 MBO The Idol Game

=== Mike ===
- 2014 "The Generation Show" in China
- 2014 "Star Family 2 days 1 night" on Sichuan TV channel in China
- 2015 "Happy Camp" on Hunan TV channel in China
- 2016 "Spring Festival Gala 2016" on CCTV-1, CCTV-4, CCTV News, CCTV-Español and CCTV-Français channels in China
- 2016 "Encounter Mr. Right" on Anhui TV channel in China
- 2017 "Chinese Restaurant" on Hunan TV channel in China
- 2017 "Happy Camp" on Hunan TV channel in China
- 2017 "HNTV Mid-Autumn Festival Night 2017" on Hunan TV channel in China
- 2017 "Day Day Up" on Hunan TV channel in China
- 2018 "FeiChangJingJuLi Talk Show" on Shenzhen TV in China
- 2018 "Spring Festival Gala 2018" on CCTV-1, CCTV-4, CCTV News, CCTV-Español and CCTV-Français channels in China
- 2018 "The Amazing Idol" on Sohu TV channels in China
- 2018 "Happy Camp" on Hunan TV channel in China
- 2018 "Lipstick Prince" on Tencent TV channel in China
- 2018 "NBA Fan day 2018 in Shanghai" in China
- 2018 "Super Nova Games 2018" in China
- 2018 "3X3 Sina Golden League (SGL) 2018" in China
- 2019 "Day Day Up" on Hunan TV channel in China
- 2019 “Lipstick Prince 2” on Tencent TV channel in China
- 2020 “Global Variety Show" on CCTV 4 in China
