= Wu Xin: The Monster Killer =

Chinese television series

- Official TVB poster
- Genre: Fantasy; Period drama Supernatural; Romance
- Based on: Wu Xin: The Monster Killer by Ni Luo
- Developed by: Sohu
- Written by: Xu Ziyuan; Xiao Zhiyao; Li Nan; Fang Qiangqiang
- Directed by: Lin Yufen; Gao Linbao
- Starring: Elvis Han; Gina Jin; Chen Yao; Zhang Ruoyun; Ian Wang; Mike D. Angelo; Sui Yongliang
- Opening theme: Lake Baikal by Li Jian
- Ending theme: The Longest Journey by Li Qi
- Country of origin: China
- Original language: Mandarin
- No. of episodes: 20

Production
- Executive producer: Li Guoli
- Producer: Karen Tsoi
- Production locations: Zhengzhou, China; Hengdian World Studios
- Editor: Xie Jiarong
- Camera setup: Multi camera
- Running time: 45 minutes
- Production companies: Sohu; Shanghai Chinese Film Productions Ltd; Tencent Penguin Pictures

Original release
- Network: Sohu TV
- Release: 6 July 2015 – 2017

Wu Xin: The Monster Killer
- Traditional Chinese: 無心法師
- Simplified Chinese: 无心法师
- Literal meaning: "Master Wu Xin"
Transcriptions
Standard Mandarin
- Hanyu Pinyin: Wú Xīn Fǎshī
Yue: Cantonese
- Yale Romanization: Mòuh Sām Faat Sī
- Jyutping: Mou4 Sam1 Faat3 Si1

Wu Xin: The Monster Killer (simplified Chinese: 无心法师; traditional Chinese: 無心法師) is a 2015 Chinese streaming television series based on Ni Luo (尼罗)'s novel of the same title. The drama is produced by Chinese web streaming company Sohu TV and stars Elvis Han, Gina Jin, Ian Wang, Chen Yao, Zhang Ruoyun, Mike D. Angelo and Sui Yongliang. The series was first aired for 20 episodes on 6 July 2015 via Sohu TV web streaming site.

The second season of the drama started airing on 14 August 2017.

== Synopsis ==
After a long slumber Wu Xin (Elvis Han) wakes up during China's new Republic era. He is a wandering immortal who lives a hungry and penniless life. He has no recollection of how long he has lived or how he came to be, but he has powers where he can sense the presence and communicate with spirits good and evil that still roam the living world. He pretends to be a monk to make a living.

During his latest slumber he wakes up next to Li Yue Ya (Gina Jin). She has just run away from home to escape a force marriage to an elderly man. Seeing how hungry Wu Xin looks she offers him her last bit of food. The two head to Wen County. To repay her act of kindness he follows her and promises that tonight the two will feast and have a place to stay. He uses his powers to search for evil spirits that intend to do harm to the living and rid them from the living world. Together the two set off pretending to be siblings to find whoever is in need of his services. At first Yue Ya does not believe Wu Xin and thinks he is a con artist until she assists him in his first job to rid an angry evil spirit residing at the local warlord's home. As the two progress on their journey, friendship and then romance form between the two.

Long Hair Ghost (Episode 1 – 2)
The home of the local warlord is inhabited by an evil spirit in the form of a long hair monster, that kills humans in order to maintain its presence in the living world. Homeless and starving, Wu Xin offers his services to rid the monster but before he does so he scares the warlord by luring the monster out of its hiding place in order to raise his payment price. Once the monster had been vanquished Wu Xin finds out that it continued to roam the living world in order to protect its master.

Cursed Bride (Episode 2 – 20)
The Long Hair ghost was protecting the soul and corpse of her master Yue Qi Luo, a teenage girl that lived during the Qing dynasty. According to the town records, during her lifetime she was a royal courtier who had fallen in love with a boy from a poor family. Her family highly objected to this relationship since the boy was impoverished and forbid Yue Qi Luo from seeing her lover again. Defying her family's orders Yue Qi Lou and her lover set to commit suicide together so they can be together in the afterlife. However Yue Qi Lou backs out from their pact after her lover hangs himself. Blaming Yue Qi Luo for the death of their son, her lover's family kidnaps Qi Luo, dressing her in a bridal outfit and burying her alive while having a Taoist priest curse her soul for eternity. Over time Gu Xuan Wu's home was built on the land above her tomb. When Wu Xin breaks the seal of her tomb she awakens. Released from her confinement she roams the living world pretending to be a homeless girl. Wu Xin immediately recognizes her because of her red bridal shoes but lets her go thinking she will do no harm until she arrives at his and Yue Ya's home.

Animal Cruelty Couple (Episode 3 – 4)
Mr. and Mrs. Su are the wealthiest couple in Wen County. Both have a penchant for wild animals, especially the young ones. He for their meat to eat and she for their fur to add to her wardrobe. while sharing his latest catch at a banquet held by Gu Xuan Wu, Mr. Su loses his appetite when he sees all food as inedible. Wanting to look good, Gu Xuan Wu drags Wu Xin to help the Su's. With Wu Xin's blood, Mr. Su sight of food is cured and he goes back to eating his wild catch animals. A few days later Mr. Su becomes more severe and eats animal feed to curb his starving appetite. When Wu Xin tells the Su's that they have offended the forest spirits by killing many innocent animals for their own pleasure and the only way to solve their problem is to become vegetarians, Mrs. Su takes offend and tells Wu Xin that both her and her husband will not be changing their lifestyle. She then tries to use force on Wu Xin to have him rid of the spirits that is causing problems for her and her husband.

Life of the Cursed Bride (Episode 5 – 6)
Jealous of Wu Xin and Yue Ya's relationship, Qi Luo takes a hold of Yue Ya's mind during her sleep and have her live her Qing dynasty life. Yue Ya wakes up in the Qing dynasty and is confused who she is. She is told by her maid that she is Yue Qi Luo, but her mind is strong telling her she is not. Just when she is about to fight off the real Qi Luo hold on her she is pulled back into Qi Luo's life. She is almost manipulated by Qi Luo into committing suicide but stops herself from doing so. Soon she goes through Qi Luo's past of being buried alive by a mob and Taoist priest. With her strong will to live, Yue Ya is able to differentiate who she is and fights off Qi Luo. Yue Ya later awaken into the present world after she breaks away from Yue Qi Luo's curse.

Haunted Villa Inn (Episode 7 – 8)
Wu Xin is hired by a business man to inspect a villa inn he is interested in buying. The inn is rumored to be haunted because the guest are never seen again once they stay there. When Wu Xin and Yue Ya arrives at the inn, they find the terms of the inn sale is a bit weird as the current owners are to stay at the inn. The current owner Mr. Yu Xiao Zhu claims he needs the money to treat his wife's illness. Soon strange things start happening as people staying at the inn disappears and Yue Ya becomes the target of a serpent spirit. The truth is soon unfolded when Mrs. Yu shows herself in order to protect Yue Ya.

Mutiny In Wen County (Episode 9 – 12)
With the help of Yue Qi Luo's black magic, Zhang Xian Zong take over Wen County and his army from Gu Xuan Wu. Qi Luo uses her paper dolls to kill citizens in Wen County to make herself more powerful. Wu Xin, Yue Ya and Gu Xuan Wu head to a monastery to seek the help of Taoist priest Chu Chen Zi to defeat Yue Qi Luo and soon finds out her true origin. However Chu Chen Zi cannot help them defeat Yue Qi Rou as he was not skilled in magic but he does know how to write amulets that can help them. Wu Xin then set off to Yue Qi Luo's tomb to search for the original amulet and spells of the Taoist priest who contained her during the Qing dynasty. However Wu Xin was trapped by Yue Qi Luo, and while he was trying to escape after a fake surrender, he was shot multiple time by Zhang Xian Zong's soldiers, eventually tearing off one of his hands. Wu Xin's soul eventually set on the broken hand, and struggled to reunite with Yue Ya and Gu Xuan Wu at the monastery. There Wu Xin began his regeneration process, started off as a maggot, and Gu Xuan Wu decided to travel to Tian Jin to meet the Old General.

Going to Tian Jin (Episode 13 – 14)
The twelfth concubine of the Old General was buried alive after being falsely accused of having an affair with an army officer. Yue Ya, Gu Xuan Wu, and Wu Xin arrived at Tian Jin, and received accommodation from Gu Xuan Wu's friend. As Wu Xin gradually regenerated into his human form, Gu Xuan Wu meets his ex lover Xiao Chun Zi. While he was about to have an affair with her, Wu Xin quickly appeared and assaulted the girl, eventually unmasked the truth that the girl was just an imitation made by Yue Qi Luo's paper dolls as an attempt to kill Gu Xuan Wu. The real Xiao Chun Zi has long been killed by the young witch. Meanwhile, the Old General's youngest son was haunted by the dead concubine's ghost. In order to create opportunity for Gu Xuan Wu to work under Old General, Wu Xin decided to deal with the concubine ghost. After several other people were killed in Old General's household, the latter was subdued by Wu Xin. With the defeat of the concubine ghost, it is revealed she truly loved the Old General, but was framed, and felt betrayed due to the Old General's actions. But the Old General did not want to release the concubine, forcing Wu Xin to ask help from an old friend Da Bai, who is a hundred years old spirit fox. The defeat of the concubine ghost also revealed that it was also a spirit fox, and was eventually carried away by Da Bai.

Underground Spirit Cave (Episode 15 – 18)
After a surprise encounter with Yue Qi Luo, Chu Chen Zi quickly traveled to Tian Jin and ask for Wu Xin's help. The two then ventured off to a cavern where it may holds the secrets to seal Yue Qi Luo again. They discovered the booklet left by Chu Chen Zi's master, but was almost trapped inside the cave after Yue Qi Luo brought alive an army of walking corpses to attack the duo. The duo made a narrow escape, with Wu Xin discovered pecks of gold from the cave. After Wu Xin brought the gold back to Tian Jin and showed them to Gu Xuan Wu, Gu Xuan Wu then suggested Old General to take control of the potential gold mine, with the latter agreed and ordered Gu Xuan Wu to carry out the mission. Before Gu's departure, Wu Xin and Yue Ya get married happily. During the excavation, Gu Xuan Wu's army was attacked by black shadow crawled out from the cave and cursed cloths, but was quickly fended off by Wu Xin and Chu Chen Zi. The black shadow was later identified as a tiny beetle that will only be melt off by sun light and can be resisted by excreted waste. As the excavation team began to work on the gold mine, Zhang Xian Zong attacked the site with his army, but they lost however, and Wen County is now once again under Gu Xuan Wu's control. At Wu Xin and Yue Ya's old house, the couple met a white fowl which host the spirit of Bai Liu Li, an old friend of Wu Xin. Yue Ya eventually knew the truth that Wu Xin will fall into slumber within a month and will forgets everything upon awakening. Initially Yue Ya was very worried, but eventually accepted the truth and vowed to stay with Wu Xin no matter what.

The final showdown (Episode 19 – 20)
During an attempt on revenge with surprise attack at Gu Xuan Wu's house, Zhang Xian Zong was shot and killed by Yue Ya in a brawl with Wu Xin. At rage, Yue Qi Luo forcefully sealed Zhang's spirit within his dead body and turns him into a walking corpse. Vowed to seek revenge, Qi Luo first create confusion to lure away Wu Xin and Gu Xuan Wu. She and Zhang Xian Zong then sneak into Yue Ya's room, and Zhang quickly snatchedaway Yue Ya's amulet. Yue Ya was then killed defenselessly after Bai Liu Li mistakenly fell into Qi Luo's trap. After Yue Ya's funeral, Wu Xin headed off to Mount Zhu Tou to search for Yue Qi Luo and there he set up a trap that overlying the entrance to a ghost cave that will absorb living human and dead spirits. Wu Xin first killed the corpse of Zhang Xian Zong by dissipating his spirit, and after a brief fight both Wu Xin and Yue Qi Luo fell into the ghost cave. Qi Luo eventually got swallowed by the cave, while Wu Xin managed to escape at the cost of a leg, and was quickly rescued by Gu Xuan Wu. One month after, Wu Xin regenerated his leg back, and along with Bai Liu Li, the two sneaked away from Gu Xuan Wu's house. Despite a desperate and long search, Gu Xuan Wu failed to find his best friend. Wu Xin fell into his slumber at a hotel and sometime after, he awoke and completely forgot the past. Bai Liu Li, despite being ordered by Wu Xin to remind him of his past with Yue Ya with the picture book drawn by her, had removed the book and all memorabilia to save him the heartache. In present time, Gu Xuan Wu, who has gotten two children by then, walks by a jewelry store and notices a pair of diamond earrings he had previously gifted to Yue Ya, despite his wife pleading to purchase them, he firmly denies this request. On the other side of the store, Wu Xin is also peering through another window and gets on a bike, Gu Xuan Wu notices him and desperately calls his name out and chases after him, Wu Xin having no memory of him rides away.

== Cast ==
=== Main ===
- Elvis Han as Wuxin (无心) *Cantonese voice dub – Ken Wong

An immortal with powers to sense the aura of evil spirits. After realizing he can make a living destroying evil spirits with his powers he pretends to be a monk soliciting his service wherever he senses evil around. Through helping the local warlord rid evil spirits he soon amass a small fortune and is able to provide comfortably for Yueya and himself.

- Gina Jin as Li Yueya (李月牙) *Cantonese voice dub – Vivien Lau

A girl Wuxin meets in the forest. She ran away from home because her step-mother wanted to force her into marriage with their landlord who was an elderly man. She was kind enough to offer her last bit of food to him. To repay her, he lets her tag along with him and takes care of her.

- Chen Yao as Yue Qiluo (岳绮罗) *Cantonese voice dub – Louise Ho

A girl that lived during the Qing dynasty. She was a royal courtier candidate who fell in love with a poor man. Due to her family objection of her relationship with a poor boy, the two lovers decide to commit suicide but she backed out after he hangs himself. Her lover's family blaming her for the death of their son, kidnaps her and has a Taoist priest bury her alive while cursing her soul for eternity. She is actual a Taoist apprentice who turned to witch craft and took over the body of the real Yue Qiluo because of her family's wealth. A great romantic who searches for love. Finding out that Wuxin is not only immortal like herself but is capable of regeneration, she becomes obsessed with learning his secrets and want him for herself.

- Zhang Ruoyun as Zhang Xianzong (张显宗) *Cantonese voice dub – Ray Li

A high-ranking officer in Gu Xuanwu's army. He is extremely jealous of and hatred towards Gu Xuan. Feeling pity for Yue Qiluo, who disguises herself as a homeless girl, he treats her to a meal which later develops into an unrequited relationship where she uses him. He soon becomes her servant, carrying out all her evil plans to kill people in order for her to survive in the living world.

- Ian Wang as Gu Xuanwu (顾玄武) *Cantonese voice dub – Cheung Yu Tung

A local warlord that has an evil spirit living in his main home. He becomes Wuxin's first client when he senses death and evil at one of his properties. After seeing the evil spirits that surrounds the County that he rules with his own eyes, he becomes friends with Wuxin and asks him to stay.

- Mike D. Angelo as Bai Liuli (白琉璃) *Cantonese voice dub – Pasu Leung

A spirit of Wuxin's acquaintance from long ago. He takes care and looks after Wuxin when he goes through his long slumber where he wakes up and forgets his past. His spirit is hosted by a silkie chicken and later a white cat. To protect Wuxin from any memories of a painful past he removes all items during Wuxin's slumber.

- Sui Yongliang as Chuchenzi (出尘子) *Cantonese voice dub – Gil Kwan

A Taoist Priest who helps Wuwin destroy Yue Qiluo. He knows of Yue Qilou's true identity as an apprentice sister of his grandfather's who had gone bad and turned to witchcraft. He is not skilled in magic and only knows how to write amulets.

=== Supporting ===
- Yi Ning as Yue Qiluo's maid/Long Hair ghost (丫鬟女煞)

Yue Qiluo's devoted maid during her lifetime. In order to continue to protect her master in the afterlife she infuse her soul into a voodoo doll made of her hair in order to be by Qiluo's side. She kills the living in order to keep her spirit in the living world.

- Kong Lianshun as Mr. Su (苏先生)

The wealthiest man in Wen County. He hunts all kinds of animals without consideration. Illusionist Huang Daxian tries to put a stop to his killing of animals.

- Shi Xiao Qun as Mrs. Su (苏太太)

Mr. Su's wife. Like her husband she kills animals without consideration due to her love of fur. Illusionist Huang Daxian also tries to stop her cruelty to animals.

- Wang Chunyuan as Huang Daxian (黄大仙)

An illusionist who is able to command the minds of other people and make them hallucinate. After able to change Mr. and Mrs. Su to vegetarians he leaves Wen County for Tianjin. Wuxin is aware of his powers and befriends him.

- Gong Fang Min as Mr. Yue (岳家老爺)

Yue Qiluo's father. He lived during the Qing dynasty. A wealthy man who was part of the imperial court.

- Lily Yuan as Mrs. Yue (岳家太太)

Yue Qiluo's mother. She lived during the Qing dynasty. She supposedly forbid her daughter's relationship with a poor man.

- Ma Xiangyi as Zhang Xianzong's 8th wife (張顯宗八姨太)

Zhang Xianzong's eighth concubine who over praises Gu Xuanwu to her husband not realizing how much her husband hates Gu Xuanwu.

- Bo Hong as Duan Sanliang's mother (段三郎母親)

Blaming her son's death of Yu Qiluo, she has a mob kidnap her and then buried alive while having a Taoist Priest curse Qiluo's soul for eternity.

- Miku Zhang as Duan Sanliang (段三郎)

A young man that lived during the Qing dynasty. He was supposedly Yue Qiluo's lover but in actuality she was a witch that seek romance and controlled his mind. When he request to break off with her due to their status difference she drives him into killing himself.

- Wu Liansheng as Li Yueya's father (月牙爹)

Afraid of his second wife who had given birth to son for him, he lets her bully him and his daughter Yueya, even allowing her to sell Yueya to their elderly landlord as a wife.

- Wang Chuang as Yu Xiaozhu (俞小竹)

A serpent demon who is a opera singer and madly in love with his wife. Unable to bear the loss of his wife, he uses black magic to take the energy of the living to keep his wife's soul in the living world.

- Zhao Ke as Mrs. Yu (俞太太)

Yu Xiaozhu's wife. She died from illness shortly after marriage. Her husband won't let her soul move on from the living world and uses black magic to keep her in the living world even though she wants leave.

- Jiang Zhongwei as Bai Wenliu (白文柳)

A business man interested in buying Yu Xiaozhu's villa inn but hearing it could be haunted because whoever stays there is never seen again, he hires Wuxin to inspect and rid all spirits away.

- Yu Xintian as Xiao Chunzi
- Hao Wenxue as Shi Shuzu
- Wang Yansu as White Fox demon
- Zhang Shan as General
- Zhang Rui jia as General's first wife
- You Jingru as General's 12th wife
- Ye Kaiwei as General's son
- Han Mei as General's 4th wife
- Lu Mei Fang as General's 5th wife
- Qiang Yu as General's assistant
- Dai Qihua as General's 9th wife
- Lu Nuannuan as Gu's 5th wife
- Ye Li Na as Zhu'er

== Soundtrack ==
No.	Title	Singer	Length
1.	"Lake Baikal (贝加尔湖畔)" (Opening theme song)	Li Jian
2.	"The Longest Journey (最長的旅途)" (Ending theme song)	Li Qi
3.	"昆曲《斷橋》"	Yu Xueqiao & Wang Shen
4.	"Remember To Forget Me (記住忘記我)" (Opening theme song (Hong Kong ver))	Alfred Hui
5.	"So Many Years (這麼多年)" (Ending theme song (Taiwan ver))	Yisa Yu

== Reception ==
Since its first showing on Sohu TV's streaming site, the drama was very well received. It set a new record for being streamed more than 18 million times in a single day.

=== Ratings ===
Hong Kong

Hong Kong TVB Jade ratings
Timeslot (HKT)	#	Day(s)	Week	Episode(s)	Average points	Peaking points
Mon – Sun (9:30-10:30 pm); 21:30–22:30	1	Mon – Fri	28 Dec 2015 – 01 Jan 2016	1 — 5	22	--
Mon – Sun (9:30-10:30 pm); 21:30–22:30	1	Sat	02 Jan 2016	6	16	--
Mon – Sun (9:30-10:30 pm); 21:30–22:30	1	Sun	03 Jan 2016	7	22	--
Mon – Sun (9:30-10:30 pm); 21:30–22:30	2	Mon – Fri	04 – 08 Jan 2016	8 — 12	22	--
Mon – Sun (9:30-10:30 pm); 21:30–22:30	2	Sun	10 Jan 2016	13	24	--
Mon – Sun (9:30-10:30 pm); 21:30–22:30	3	Mon – Fri	11 – 15 Jan 2016	14 — 18	23	--
Mon – Sun (9:30-10:30 pm); 21:30–22:30	3	Sat	16 Jan 2016	19	19	--
Mon – Sun (9:30-10:30 pm); 21:30–22:30	3	Sun	17 Jan 2016	20	25	--
Total average					22	--

=== Awards and nominations ===
Year	Award	Category	Nominated work	Result	Ref.
2015	2nd Hengdian Film and TV Festival of China	Best Web Series	Wu Xin: The Monster Killer	Won	
2016	1st Golden Guduo Media Awards	Best IP Adapted Web Series	Wu Xin: The Monster Killer	Won	
2016	1st Golden Guduo Media Awards	Best Actor (Web series)	Elvis Han	Won	
2016	1st Golden Guduo Media Awards	Best Supporting Actress (Web series)	Chen Yao	Won	

== International broadcast ==
Network	Country	Airing Date	Timeslot
Sohu TV	China	July 6, 2015	Web streaming
GTV Variety	Taiwan	July 18, 2015	Saturday 9:30 – 11:30 pm
GTV	Taiwan	July 19, 2015	Sunday 12:00 – 2:00 pm
TVB Jade; Jade HD	Hong Kong	December 28, 2015	Monday – Sunday 9:30 – 10:30 pm
Astro On Demand	Malaysia	December 28, 2015	Monday – Sunday 9:30 – 10:30 pm
TVBJ	Australia	December 29, 2015	Monday – Sunday 12:30 – 1:30 am
VV Drama	Singapore	April 1, 2016	Monday – Sunday 9:00 – 10:00 pm
Channel 3	Thailand	December 4, 2017	Monday – Wednesday 12:40 – 1:45 pm
