= Wang Yanlin =

Chinese actor (born 1989)

- 王彦霖
- Born: 28 July 1989 (age 37); Anshan, Liaoning, China
- Education: Shanghai Theatre Academy
- Occupation: Actor
- Years active: 2011–present
- Agents: Tangren Media; Wang Yanlin Studio
- Spouse: Ai Jiani (2021-)

Chinese name
- Chinese: 王彦霖
Transcriptions
Standard Mandarin
- Hanyu Pinyin: Wáng Yànlín

Wang Yanlin (Chinese: 王彦霖, born 28 July 1989), also known as Ian Wang, is a Chinese actor. He is best known for his works in Wu Xin: The Monster Killer (2015), The Starry Night, The Starry Sea (2017). He also starred in the film Operation Red Sea (2018) and The Rescue (2020 film). In 2019, he became a cast member of the popular variety program, Keep Running, for the new season.

== Early life ==
Wang was born on 28 July 1989, and attended Shanghai Theatre Academy.

== Personal life ==
On Chinese valentines, 20 May 2021, he announced his marriage with college classmate Ai Jiani.

== Career ==
=== Career beginnings ===
In 2011, Wang was picked by director Chen Mingzhang, who cast him in the television series My Splendid Life

In 2013, he was cast in the romance drama Remembering Lichuan.

In 2014, Wang starred in two television series produced by Tangren Media; the sports romance drama Go! Goal! Fighting! and the historical fantasy drama The Legend of Qin.

=== 2015–present: Rising popularity ===
Wang's breakout came in 2015, with his appearance in popular period dramas Wu Xin: The Monster Killer and Lady and Liar.

Wang made his film debut with a cameo appearance in the crime caper film Chongqing Hot Pot.

In 2017, he starred in fantasy drama The Starry Night, The Starry Sea based on the novel of the same name by Tong Hua. The same year, he starred in the historical action drama Princess Agents and gained recognition with his portrayal of the antagonist character Yuwen Huai.

In 2018, Wang starred in the war action film Operation Red Sea, receiving positive reviews for his performance. The same year, he starred in his first lead role in the comedy action web series The Big Bug.

In 2019, it was announced that Wang has joined the cast of variety program Keep Running. The same year, he was cast in the action film The Rescue, reuniting with Operation Red Sea director Dante Lam.

In 2020, he was cast in You Are My Glory alongside Yang Yang and Dilraba Dilmurat.

== Discography ==
=== Singles ===
| Year | English title | Chinese title | Album | Notes |
|---|---|---|---|---|
| 2019 | —N/a | "造亿万吨光芒" | Keep Running theme song | With Li Chen, Angelababy, Zheng Kai, Zhu Yawen, Lucas Wong and Song Yuqi |
| 2019 | "Crazy Waves" | 狂浪 | The Rescue OST | |

== Filmography ==
=== Film ===
| Year | English title | Chinese title | Role | Notes |
|---|---|---|---|---|
| 2016 | Chongqing Hot Pot | 火锅英雄 | Robber | Cameo |
| 2018 | Operation Red Sea | 红海行动 | Luo Xing | |
| 2020 | The Rescue | 紧急救援 | | |
| 2020 | Graduating | 毕业进行时 | Zhou Quan | |
| 2022 | Only Fools Rush In | 四海 | | |
| 2025 | Operation Hadal | 蛟龙行动 | Luo Xing | |

=== Television series ===
| Year | English title | Chinese title | Role | Notes |
|---|---|---|---|---|
| 2011 | My Splendid Life | 我的燦爛人生 | Zheng Qi | |
| 2015 | Tour Between Two Lovers | 向幸福出发 | Secretary Wang | |
| 2015 | Lady & Liar | 千金女贼 | Shi Tou | |
| 2015 | Wu Xin: The Monster Killer | 无心法师 | Gu Xuan Wu | |
| 2015 | The Legend of Qin | 秦时明月 | Dong Guo Zhi | |
| 2016 | Go! Goal! Fighting! | 旋风十一人 | Cong Yue | |
| 2016 | Remembering Lichuan | 遇见王沥川 | Xie Xiao Dong | |
| 2016 | Yi Guan Xiao Zhan 2 | 医馆笑传2 | Liu Song | |
| 2016 | Plastic Surgery Season | 整容季 | | Cameo |
| 2017 | Love & Life & Lie | 遇见爱情的利先生 | Pei Jiaqi | |
| 2017 | The Starry Night, The Starry Sea | 那片星空那片海 | Zhu Yiyang | |
| 2017 | Across The Ocean To See You | 漂洋过海来看你 | Su Chang | |
| 2017 | Princess Agents | 特工皇妃楚乔传 | Yuwen Huai | |
| 2017 | Wu Xin: The Monster Killer 2 | 无心法师 2 | Gu Ji | |
| 2017 | Detective Dee | 通天狄仁傑 | | Cameo |
| 2018 | The Big Bug | 继承者计划 | Li Jinshui/ Jin Jiji | |
| 2018 | Lost in 1949 | 脱身 | | Cameo |
| 2021 | Sword Snow Stride | 雪中悍刀行 | Wen Hua [Ranger] | Cameo |
| 2021 | You Are My Glory | 你是我的荣耀 | Zhai Liang/ "Panicky" [Yu Tu's friend] | Support Role |
| 2021 | Litter to Glitter | 燃烧吧废柴 | Fang Tian Yi | Main Role |
| TBA | My Later Half of Life | 熟年 | | Support Role |
| TBA | The Baking Challenge | 点心之路 | He Xian | Main Role |
| TBA | Game of Death | 幻境猎手 | Liu Zetian | |
| TBA | Chinese Peacekeeping Force | 蓝盔特战队 | Nie Feng | |

=== Television shows ===
| Year | English title | Chinese title | Role | Notes |
|---|---|---|---|---|
| 2018 | Hi Roommate | Hi室友 | Cast member | |
| 2019 | Keep Running | 奔跑吧 | Cast member | |
| 2019 | The Protectors | 小小的追球 | Cast member | |
| 2020 | The Irresistible | 元气满满的哥哥 | Cast member | |
