= Elvis Han =

Chinese actor

Han Dongjun
- Born: July 21, 1992 (age 34); Harbin, Heilongjiang, China
- Education: Shanghai Theatre Academy
- Occupation: Actor
- Years active: 2014–present
- Agent: Tangren Media

Chinese name
- Traditional Chinese: 韓東君
- Simplified Chinese: 韩东君
Transcriptions
Standard Mandarin
- Hanyu Pinyin: Hán Dōngjūn

Han Dongjun (Chinese: 韩东君, born 21 July 1992), also known as Elvis Han, is a Chinese actor.

== Early life and education ==
Han attended high school in Vancouver, Canada from 2007 to 2011, during which he was active in local singing competitions and was spotted by director Jin Sha for her web film Vancouver Rock and Roll (2011). Following his first acting project, Han became interested in performance. Despite his admission to Vancouver Film School, Han returned to China and entered Shanghai Theatre Academy in 2012.

Han is also a car racer, having received a professional certification from the Federation of Automobile Sports of the People's Republic of China (FASC). He played a racer in the sports drama Speed (2018).

== Career ==
In 2014, Han played a minor role in the wuxia drama The Romance of the Condor Heroes.

In 2015, Han rose to fame for his title role in the hit fantasy period web drama Wu Xin: The Monster Killer. The same year he starred in a well-received supporting turn in modern drama Good Times.

In 2016, Han starred as the male lead in the fantasy action drama Chinese Paladin 5.

In 2018, Han starred in leading roles in period romance melodrama Siege in Fog, historical drama Secret of the Three Kingdoms where he played Sima Yi and romance drama Never Gone.

== Filmography ==
=== Film ===
| Year | English title | Chinese title | Role | Notes/Ref. |
|---|---|---|---|---|
| 2011 | Vancouver Rock and Roll | 温哥华酱油乐队 | Su Pan | |
| 2019 | My People, My Country | 我和我的祖国 | Airforce Pilot | |
| 2021 | The Battle at Lake Changjin | 长津湖 | | |
| 2022 | The Battle at Lake Changjin II | 长津湖之水门桥 | | |
| 2025 | Operation Hadal | 蛟龙行动 | Qin Dawei | |

=== Television series ===
| Year | English title | Chinese title | Role | Network | Notes/Ref. |
|---|---|---|---|---|---|
| 2014 | The Romance of the Condor Heroes | 神雕侠侣 | Wu Xiuwen | Hunan TV | |
| 2015 | Wu Xin: The Monster Killer | 无心法师 | Wu Xin | Sohu TV | |
| 2015 | Good Times | 大好時光 | Luo Yiyang | Dragon TV | |
| 2016 | Chinese Paladin 5 | 仙剑云之凡 | Jiang Yunfan | Hunan TV | |
| 2017 | Wu Xin: The Monster Killer II | 无心法师II | Wu Xin | Sohu TV | |
| 2018 | Siege in Fog | 人生若如初相见 | Yi Liankai | Tencent | |
| 2018 | Secret of the Three Kingdoms | 三国机密 | Sima Yi | Tencent | |
| 2018 | 20 Once Again | 重返20岁 | Niu Wenzheng | iQiyi, Tencent | |
| 2018 | Speed | 极速青春 | Lu Jie | Dragon TV | |
| 2018 | Never Gone | 原来你还在这里 | Cheng Zheng | Youku | |
| 2020 | Wu Xin: The Monster Killer III | 无心法师III | Wu Xin | iQiyi, Tencent | |
| 2023 | Fake It till you Make It | 装腔启示录 | Xu Zi Quan | Mango TV | |
| 2023 | Mr. and Mrs. Chen | 梅花桃红 | Chen Jia Ping | iQiyi, Tencent | |
| TBA | Our Story in Beijing | 北京往事 | | | |
| TBA | My Talent Neighbour | 走起！我的天才街坊 | Chen Xiao | Youku | |

=== Variety show ===
| Year | English title | Chinese title | Role | Network | Notes/Ref. |
|---|---|---|---|---|---|
| 2017 | Back to Youth | 我们十七岁 | Cast member | Zhejiang TV | |
| 2018 | Super Penguin League; Season:1 | 超级企鹅联盟super3 | Player; Live Basketball Competition | Tencent | |
| 2020 | Summer Surf Shop | 夏日冲浪店 | Cast member | iQiyi | |

=== Theater ===
| Year | English title | Chinese title | Role | Notes/Ref. |
|---|---|---|---|---|
| 2014 | Under the Hawthorn Tree | 山楂樹之戀 | Lao San | |

== Discography ==
| Year | English title | Chinese title | Album | Notes/Ref. |
|---|---|---|---|---|
| 2016 | "Not Able to Love" | 无法说爱 | Chinese Paladin 5 OST | |
| 2016 | "Chaos in the Rain" | 乱世雨 | Love & Sword OST | |
| 2018 | "Time Reflux" | 时光倒流 | Never Gone OST | |
| 2018 | "Extreme Youth" | 极速青春 | Speed OST | |
| 2019 | "My Motherland and I" | 我和我的祖国 | Qing Chun Wei Zu Guo Er Chang | |

== Awards and nominations ==
| Year | Awards | Category | Nominated work | Result | Ref. |
|---|---|---|---|---|---|
| 2016 | 1st China Television Drama Quality Ceremony | New Actor Award | Wu Xin: The Monster Killer, Good Times | Won | |
| 2016 | 1st Golden Guduo Media Awards | Best Actor (Web series) | Wu Xin: The Monster Killer | Won | |
| 2017 | 14th Esquire Man At His Best Awards | Most Fashionable Artist | —N/a | Won | |
| 2018 | 10th China TV Drama Awards | Rising New Actor | —N/a | Won | |
| 2019 | 6th The Actors of China Award Ceremony | Best Actor (Emerald Category) | Never Gone | Nominated | |
| 2020 | 7th The Actors of China Award Ceremony | Best Actor (Web series) | —N/a | Pending | |
