= Kitty GYM =

Japanese musical group

- Also known as: GYM
- Origin: Japan
- Genres: Pop
- Years active: 2006
- Labels: Johnny's Entertainment
- Past members: Hiromitsu Kitayama; Kei Inoo; Shota Totsuka; Hikaru Yaotome; Golf; Tomohisa Yamashita; Mike

Kitty GYM was a temporary Japanese idol unit formed in 2006 to promote the 2006 FIVB Volleyball World Grand Prix. The group consisted of Tomohisa Yamashita of NEWS, Thai pop duo Golf & Mike, and members of the Johnny's Jr. group Kitty (Hiromitsu Kitayama, Kei Inoo, Shota Totsuka, and Hikaru Yaotome). The name of the group came from the first letters of the members surnames, and the Thai members pseudonyms.

On July 18, 2006, GYM (Golf, Yamashita, and Mike) held an event at the NHK Hall and performed "Fever to Future" for the first time. "Fever to Future" was used as the image song for Fuji Television's broadcast of the 2006 FIVB Volleyball World Grand Prix. They made their first appearance as a 7-member unit on August 19, 2006, at the Ariake Coliseum, where they performed "Fever to Future" to a crowd of 10,000 fans.

The group released their only single, "Fever to Future", on August 30, 2006. It included a solo song by Tomohisa Yamashita and a duet by Golf & Mike. Released under the name "GYM", the single debuted atop the Oricon Singles Chart on the week ending September 11, 2006. In the same month of release, it was certified Platinum by the Recording Industry Association of Japan for shipments of 250,000 units. It went on to sell over 300,000 copies, making it the 25th best-selling single of the year in Japan. The single was released in Thailand on September 6, 2006, and in Taiwan on September 12, 2006.

Since their disbandment, all members have gone on to have successful music careers. Kei Inoo and Hikaru Yaotome debuted as members of Hey! Say! JUMP in 2007, Golf & Mike disbanded in 2010 and became solo singers, Hiromitsu Kitayama debuted as a member of Kis-My-Ft2 in August 2011, Tomohisa Yamashita left NEWS in October 2011 to pursue a solo career, and Shota Totsuka debuted as a member of A.B.C-Z in 2012.

== "Fever to Future" ==
"Fever to Future"

Single by GYM
- Language: Japanese
- Released: August 30, 2006
- Genre: Pop; dance
- Length: 19:12
- Label: Johnny's Entertainment
- Songwriter(s): A to Z; H.U.B.; Shin Tanimoto

"Fever to Future" is a single by GYM. It was released on August 30, 2006, through Johnny's Entertainment. "Fever to Future" was written by A to Z, H.U.B., and Shin Tanimoto, and arranged by Naoya Kurosawa and Shunsuke Yabuki. It is an uptempo dance song.

=== Track listing ===
No.	Title	Lyrics	Music	Length
1.	"Fever to Future"	A to Z; H.U.B.	Shin Tanimoto	3:51
2.	"Hōkago Blues" (Yamashita solo)	Tomohisa Yamashita	Yamashita	4:05
3.	"Run For Your Love" (Golf & Mike duet)	Shusui; Stefan Åberg	Shusui; Åberg	3:51
4.	"My Angel"	Ritsuko Yato; Zopp	Shusui; Axel Bellinder; Stefan Engblom; Per Lundberg	3:13
5.	"Fever to Future" (instrumental)		Tanimoto	3:52
Total length:				19:12

Limited edition
No.	Title	Lyrics	Music	Length
1.	"Fever to Future"	A to Z; H.U.B.	Tanimoto	3:51
2.	"Hōkago Blues" (Yamashita solo)	Yamashita	Yamashita	4:05
3.	"Run For Your Love" (Golf & Mike duet)	Shusui; Åberg	Shusui; Åberg	3:51
Total length:				11:58

Limited edition – DVD
No.	Title	Length
1.	"Fever to Future" (music video)
2.	"Making of Fever to Future"
3.	"Special Interview"
Total length:		20:00
