= Mike Angelo =

Thai singer and actor (born 1989)

- พิรัชต์ นิธิไพศาลกุล
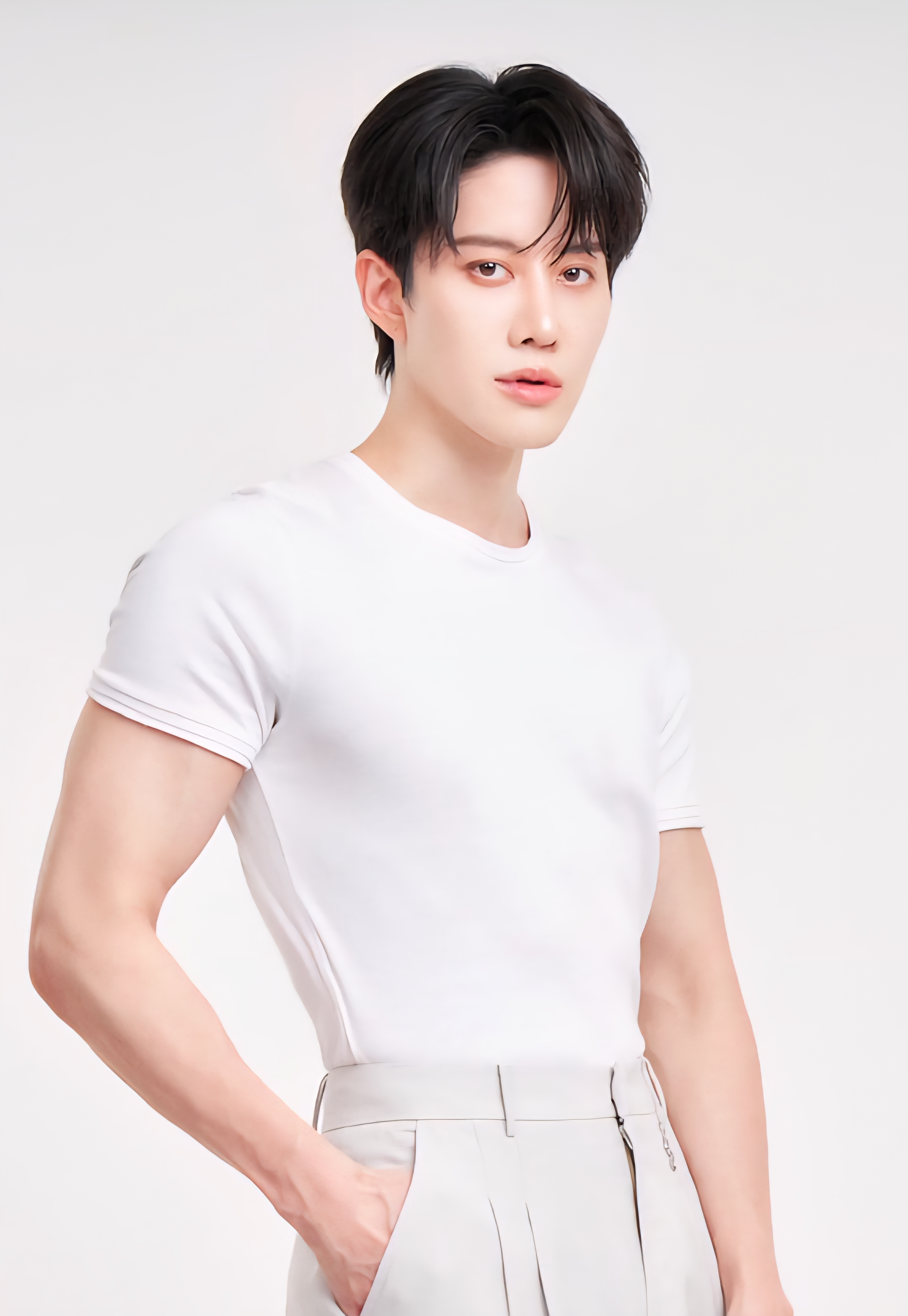
- Mike in 2025
- Born: Pirat Nitipaisalkul; December 19, 1989 (age 36); Bangkok, Thailand
- Other names: Mike Angelo, Wu Yige
- Education: Chulalongkorn University
- Occupations: Actor; singer
- Years active: 2005–present
- Agent: MDA Entertainment
- Height: 180 cm (5 ft 11 in)
- Children: 1
- Musical career
- Genres: Thai pop; J-pop; dance-pop; hip hop; R&B
- Instrument: Vocals
- Label: MDA Entertainment
- Formerly of: Golf & Mike

Chinese name
- Traditional Chinese: 吳翊歌
- Simplified Chinese: 吴翊歌
Transcriptions

Pirat Nitipaisalkul (Thai: พิรัชต์ นิธิไพศาลกุล; born December 19, 1989), known professionally as Mike Angelo (Thai: ไมค์ แองเจโล่), is a Thai actor and singer. He is known for being part of the Thai musical duo Golf & Mike. He was a member of the duo along with his brother, Golf Pichaya Nitipaisalkul, from 2005 to 2010.

Mike made his acting debut in the 2008 Thai television drama Ubatruk Karmkobfah. Since then, he has appeared in many popular Thai films and television dramas, including Full House (2014) and Kiss Me (2015). Mike has also appeared in many Chinese television series notably Wu Xin: The Monster Killer (2015), Delicious Destiny (2015), My Little Princess(2016), Mr. Swimmer (2018) and Speed and Love (2025) and Mike also appeared in a Hollywood Film The Misfits.

== Career ==
=== 2005—2010: Career beginnings and acting debut ===
Mike debuted as a member of the duo Golf & Mike in October 2005 with their self-titled album, Golf-Mike. Their dance-pop track "Bounce" was chosen to be the album's first promotional single, and it became a big hit in Thailand. From 2006 to 2009, the duo actively released and promoted their albums and songs in Thailand, Japan, China and South Korea. In 2008, Mike made his acting debut in the Thai television drama Ubatruk Karmkobfah. In 2010, the duo Golf & Mike disbanded and Mike became a solo artist.

=== 2011—2015: Solo debut and acting career in Thailand ===
On March 1, 2011, Mike officially released his new solo single, "Ayo". In 2012, he appeared in the TV dramas Likit Fah Cha Ta and Raak Boon. In 2014, he took the role of Lee Yong-jae (originally played by Rain) in the Thai remake of the South Korean drama Full House, in which he paired up with actress Sushar Manaying. In 2015, he and his Full House co-star Sushar Manaying reunited in the Thai drama, Kiss Me, an adaptation of the Japanese manga Itazura na Kiss. Both of the shows were well received by the audience.

=== 2015—present: Acting career in China and rising popularity ===
Mike made his acting debut in Chinese industry through the 2015 TV series, Wu Xin: The Monster Killer as Bai Luli. He got his first leading role in the 2016 drama My Little Princess opposite Zhang Yuxi. He later starred in the 2017 television series Delicious Destiny opposite Mao Xiaotong. The series was well received by viewers, surpassing more than 7 billion views and the number 1 rating while broadcasting, making Mike more famous in China. In 2018, he starred in the drama Mr. Swimmer opposite Ju Jingyi. In 2019, he appeared in the second season of the drama My Amazing Boyfriend 2 as Xue Lingqiao opposite Yu Shuxin.

In 2021, he joined the cast of the Hollywood Film The Misfits as the character Wick.

In 2024, he joined the cast of Chuang Asia: Thailand as a mentor. He took on the role of producer for the first time with the series VAMP: Eternal Destiny under his own company MDA Entertainment.

In January 2025, he was announced as the cast of Speed and Love starring Yu Shuxin and He Yu.

== Personal life ==
Angelo has a son born in 2014 with his ex-girlfriend Italian-Thai model Sara Casinghini. He has three older brothers and a younger sister. He is of Thai-Chinese descent. He attended Ruamrudee International School in Bangkok, later graduating from Chulalongkorn University.

== Filmography ==
=== Films ===
Year	Title	Role	Notes
2010	Eternity		Cameo
2012	Love in the Water	Xiao Le	
2013	H Project	Nick	
2015	Surprise	Zhu Bajie	
2017	Mr. Pride vs Miss Prejudice	Jiang Hai	
2017	The House That Never Dies 2	Raymond	
2021	The Misfits	Wick	
2022	Creepy Crawly (alternate title: The One Hundred)	Leo	

=== Television series ===
Year	Title	Role	Notes	Ref.
2008–2009	Ubatruk Karmkobfah	Mike	Season 1-2	
2012	Likit Fah Cha Ta Din	Kritpaidin		
2012	Raak Boon	Lapin (Ton)		
2014	Full House	Mike / Thawin Kanjanachairot		
2014	Raak Boon 2	"Ton" Laphin / Phop		
2014	Maya Nang Fah	Ramil		
2015	Hua Jai Patapee	Purin		
2015	Wu Xin: The Monster Killer	Bai Liuli		
2015	Kiss Me	Thatrapee Warophat / Tenten		
2015	Devil Lover	Khenta		
2016	Legend of the Nine Tails Fox	Husi	Tale 04	
2016	My Little Princess	Jiang Nianyu		
2017	Little Valentine	Gong Yan		
2017	Wu Xin: The Monster Killer Season 2	Bai Liuli		
2017	Delicious Destiny	Li Yuzhe		
2018	Mr. Swimmer	Bai Yongzhe		
2019	My Amazing Boyfriend Season 2	Xue Lingqiao		
2025	Speed and Love	Lin Sui / Lin Luo		
	Happy Ending	Finn		
	VAMP: Eternal Destiny	V		

=== Television shows ===
Year	Title	Role	Notes
2018	Lipstick Prince	Cast member	
2018	Super Nova Games Season 3	Cast member	
2019	Lipstick Prince Season 2	Cast member	
2022	Call Me By Fire Season 2	Cast member	
2024	Chuang Asia: Thailand	Mentor	
