= Suppanad Jittaleela =

Thai actress, DJ, model and singer (born 1991)

- ศุภนาฎ จิตตลีลา
- Born: Suppanad Jittaleela; February 12, 1991 (age 35); Photharam, Ratchaburi
- Other name: Tina
- Education: Chiang Mai University
- Occupations: Actress; singer
- Years active: 2010–present
- Notable work: Yes or No (film)

Suppanad Jittaleela (Thai: ศุภนาฎ จิตตลีลา; RTGS: Supphanat Chittalila, born February 12, 1991, in Ratchaburi Province, Thailand), also known as Tina, is a Thai actress, DJ, model and singer (The Painter band). She became famous for her breakout role as the protagonist Kim in the movie Yes or No (2010), a role which she later reprised in the films' sequel Yes or No 2 (2012). Because of the success of the films, she became famous across Asia especially in China.

Tina is one of the casts of a new drama under Media Channel which title is Sood Rak Plick Lock. She is also one of the casts of Japanese-Thai movie about music, drama and romance entitled, Love Sud Jin Fun Sugoi where famous rock band singer Makoto Koshinaka is also one of the characters together with Apinnya Sakuljarunsoek and Tao Sattaphong Phiangpor. Love Sud Jin Fin Sugoi will be released next year. Another movie of Tina is the second installment of the famous horror movie titled, "3am". "The Convent" is the last part of this movie, in this film, Tina will play a role of a student who wants to redeem her wish in terms of success in love. "3am Part 2 3D" was said to be released on January 16, 2014, in Thailand. Like the success of the first 3am, it might also be released in outside Thailand like Taiwan, Hong Kong, Macau, Cambodia, Indonesia and China.

== Personal life ==
Born Suppanad Jittaleela on February 12, 1991, in Ratchaburi, Thailand, Tina moved to Bangkok after she finished primary school. There, she studied at Satriwithaya School until she graduated, and later studied software engineering at Chiang Mai University. She took a break from school to focus on work, but eventually graduated with a degree in Communication Arts at Rangsit University on December 13, 2015.

She is about 170 cm tall.

Jittaleela was given the “Kim” character role in Yes or No because of her more natural female-sounding voice compared to other tomboy actresses.

She is known for her tomboy style. Fans have questioned her sexual orientation after the success of her lesbian character in the movie Yes or No, and for comments she has made in interviews.

Before getting into film work, Jittaleela worked as a DJ at Pynk FM, and used to be a runway model. She is more popular outside of Thailand, mostly in China and other East Asian countries such as Hong Kong and Taiwan. However, Jittaleela is a rising star in Thailand and has been gaining popularity.

On September 26, 2016, at her hometown in Ratchaburi, a fire burned down the family's home and killed her parents.
