= Kathoey Pen Het =

1954 Thai silent short film

- Thai: กะเทยเป็นเหตุ
- Release date: 1954
- Running time: 12 minutes
- Country: Thailand
- Language: Silent film

Kathoey Pen Het (Thai: กะเทยเป็นเหตุ; lit. It's All Because of a Katoey) is a 1954 Thai silent black-and-white film. It was the first Thai film to have a kathoey main character as well as include an LGBTQ storyline.

== Synopsis ==
The film begins with an intertitle that suggests it is a "masterpiece of tragedy," even though functionally it is structured as a comedy.

A group of men are hanging out and playing pool when a beautiful woman arrives. The fiancée of one of the men in the group, the woman attracts attention from another man who is playing the guitar.

While her fiancé is distracted, the woman leaves with the man. However, they are soon discovered by the fiancé, and a fight occurs between both of the men. A policeman clumsily joins in on the chaos. Though he ends up arresting the fiancé, he becomes distracted by the woman's beauty.

Although the policeman tries to become intimate with the woman, she rejects him. Angry, they squabble, and he accidentally knocks the wig off the woman's head, revealing that she is a kathoey. In the final scene of the film, the policeman is shown crying.

== Background ==
In 1993, a 16 mm print of Kathoey Pen Het was discovered within the Thai Film Archive. The film was originally donated by Manop Silpi, who was connected through his uncle, Charlee Silpi, to a group of amateur filmmakers known as Ledger.

In the 1950s, it was common for amateur film groups to hold private screenings of films that they created. As a result, researchers Sanchai Chotirosseranee and Atit Pongpanit believe that Ledger likely never planned to distribute the film to the wider public. However, it is ultimately unclear if Kathoey Pen Het was ever shown to anyone outside of the group.

The film's discovery changed how the history of Thai queer media was understood. Prior to 1993, The Last Song (1985) was thought to be the country's first LGBTQ film. When Kathoey Pen Het was found, it opened up the possibility that there might be even older works that explored similar themes or issues.

In 2019, the movie was added to the Thai Ministry of Culture's register of cultural heritage.

== Analysis ==
Atit Pongpanit and Ben Murtagh believe that the film is representative of the "'tolerant but unaccepting' position of kathoey[s] in the early Thai mediascape." They point out how the kathoey character is linked to humor and disappointment, yet is still seen as attractive and desirable. In addition, despite tricking the men, she is never punished.

In a piece of writing by the Thai Film Archive, the organization observes that kathoeys have often been used in film as comedic figures. Kathoey Pen Het complicates this by making the kathoey the fiancée of one of the men, demonstrating a kind of progressiveness that "even Thai films in the modern period rarely show."

== Distribution ==
On May 17, 2015, a nine-minute long copy of the film was shared online by the Thai Film Archive. In 2019, the full twelve-minute version was released.

The film was also included as part of the "Over the Rainbow" exhibit at the Thai Film Archive in 2023.
