= Yes or No 2 =

Thai LGBTQ+ film

- Theatrical release poster
- Thai: รักไม่รักอย่ากั๊กเลย
- Directed by: Sarasawadee Wongsompetch
- Produced by: Bhandit Thongdee; Wattana Weerayawattana
- Starring: Sucharat Manaying; Suppanad Jittaleela; Sarunthorn Klaiudom
- Cinematography: Ruengwit Ramasoota
- Production company: Come On Sweet (TH)
- Release date: 16 August 2012 (Thailand)
- Running time: 108
- Country: Thailand
- Language: Thai
- Budget: ฿200 million baht THB

Yes or No 2 (Thai: รักไม่รักอย่ากั๊กเลย, romanized: Rak Mai Rak Ya Kak Loei), also known as Yes or No 2: Come Back to Me, is a 2012 Thai romantic comedy film directed by Sarasawadee Wongsompetch, starring Sucharat Manaying and Suppanad Jitaleela. The sequel toYes or No (2010), inYes or No 2 Sucharat and Suppanad reprise their roles as Pie and Kim.

== Plot ==
Three years later after the plot of Yes or No, Kim and Pie have graduated from college. Still in love, Kim and Pie initially planned to find internships close to each other, but a lack of options causes them to head in different directions.

While Kim works on a farm in the northern province of Nan, Pie works at a fishery near the southern coast of Thailand. Forced into a long distance relationship, their love is tested by Jam, Kim's co-worker on the farm who develops a crush on her.

== Cast ==
- Sucharat Manaying as Pie
- Suppanad Jittaleela as Kim
- Sarunthorn Klaiudom as Jam
- Inthira Yuenyong as Aunt In
- Maneerut Wongjirasak as Pie's Mother
- Puttipong Promsaka Na Sakolnakorn as Kim's Father
- Ruechanok Meesang as Meena
- Premprida Sakulsripon as Maesa
- Nisa Boonsantia as Yongkoa
- Thanapat Sornkoon as Peoi
- Narumon Reanaiprai as Nerd
- Thanabordin Yongsuebchat as P'Duang
- Kacharin Khumwong as P'Joe
- Surapong Kunarattanapruk as P'Su
- Bhandit Thongdee as P'Odd
- Sophon Phoonsawat as P'Jeab
- Pattamaket Jaichansuhhit as P'Som
- Penchan Wongsomphet as Fair Official Lady
- Piyawan Ruengpanyawut as Waitress

== Production ==
During an interview, Saratsawadee Wongsomphet shared that she would have never expected a sequel to be possible during the making of the original film. She attributed the creation of Yes or No 2 to be due to the support of both Thai and international fans.

Chatchada Musikaratuay, Yes or No 2's executive producer, paid for the movie's 20 million baht budget out of her own pocket. She used money from DVD sales, actor appearances, and merchandise in order to gather enough funds.

According to Chatchada, a few Chinese investors initially offered to fund the film with the condition that one of the leads was changed from a girl to a guy. She refused, and kept the sapphic themes of the film intact.

== Release ==
Yes or No 2 premiered theatrically in Thailand on 16 August 12.

=== Home Media ===
The film was released as a VOD on Netflix in the United States and United Kingdom on 7 November 2018.

=== Box Office ===
Within the first four days of Yes or No 2's release, the film grossed over 10.4 million baht, and reached number two at the box office.

== Reception ==
=== Accolades ===
In 2013, Sarunthorn Klaiudom was nominated for her role in Yes or No 2 under the category of Best Supporting Actress at the Thailand National Film Association Awards.

== 2015 Release: Yes or No 2.5 ==
In 2015, an additional film, Yes or No 2.5 (Thai: กลับมา เพื่อรักเธอ), was released.

ComeOn Sweet had previously announced their desire to produce more "Yes or No movies...[such as] Yes or No 2.6, 2.7..." However, they clarified that Yes or No 2.5 was not a sequel to Yes or No 2, despite sharing the same name. Instead, both films have different storylines and characters.

Yes or No 2.5 was directed by Kirati Nakintanon and stars Sunanta Yoonniyom, Chansakorn Kittiwattanakorn, Suppanad Jittaleela, and Pimpakan Bangchawong. It was released on 28 May 2018.

== See also ==
- List of LGBT-related films directed by women
- List of Thai films
