= The Misfits (2021 film) =

2021 American film by Renny Harlin

- Theatrical release poster
- Directed by: Renny Harlin
- Screenplay by: Robert Henny; Kurt Wimmer
- Story by: Robert Henny
- Produced by: Mansoor Al Dhaheri; Kia Jam; Dean Altit
- Starring: Pierce Brosnan; Rami Jaber; Hermione Corfield; Jamie Chung; Mike Angelo; Tim Roth; Nick Cannon
- Cinematography: Denis Alarcón Ramírez
- Edited by: Colleen Rafferty
- Music by: Lasse Enersen; Trevor Rabin
- Production companies: Film Gate Productions; RNG Entertainment; The Misfits Project; K.Jam Media; Highland Film Group
- Distributed by: The Avenue Entertainment
- Release dates: June 3, 2021 (South Korea); June 11, 2021 (United States)
- Running time: 94 minutes
- Country: United States
- Language: English
- Budget: $15 million
- Box office: $1.6 million

The Misfits is a 2021 American heist action film directed by Renny Harlin and written by Robert Henny and Kurt Wimmer. The film stars Pierce Brosnan, Rami Jaber, Hermione Corfield, Jamie Chung, Mike Angelo, Tim Roth, Nick Cannon and Qais Qandil.

It was released in South Korea on June 3, 2021, and was released in the United States on June 11, 2021, by The Avenue Entertainment. The film received negative reviews, receiving three nominations at the 42nd Golden Raspberry Awards.

== Plot ==
Richard Pace is a professional thief, and prison escapee. Werner Schultz, owner of several private prisons, three of which Pace has escaped from, learns he is about to be released, but Pace escapes the day before Schultz's visit. Pace stayed in the prison to learn about a wealthy man called the Prince, who is currently in Los Angeles. When he tries to steal the Prince's valuable watch collection, he suddenly realizes it is a trap set by the Prince. Forced to choose between Schultz and the FBI, Pace chooses the former, who takes him to his private plane. There, he meets three others, locksmith and master of disguise Ringo, explosives expert Wick and deadly martial artist Violet, known as the Misfits.

En route to Abu Dhabi, the Misfits are briefed: Schultz laundered money taken from a Brotherhood, converting it into gold. He is hiding it in one of his prison's safes, located in Jazeristan. They plan to steal it to block its use for terrorism, but they need Pace's help. Initially refusing, his daughter Hope changes his mind. Pace wants to keep 50% of the gold they steal, but is told no one is keeping it.

Preparing the Jazeristan prison infiltration, the Misfits learn the Brotherhood's leader Abu Hirawa sent his right-hand man Jason Quick to collect gold bars from Schultz. However, they swap the case. Enraged, Hirawa kills Quick, then warns Schultz he is coming to get the gold bars from him directly in Jazeristan, on the day of the heist.

Once in Jazeristan, Ringo disguises himself and convinces the warden Abdullah to replace the kitchen ovens. On the day this happens, Pace and Wick switch places with the Prince's contacts, disguising themselves as prisoners. While moving the ovens, Pace damages a statue honoring Schultz. The next day, they taint the prisoners' food, causing major vomiting and diarrhea in most, so multiple prisoners are relocated to a nearby hospital via ambulances. Suspicious, Schultz fears Pace is in Jazeristan to steal his gold, so orders a search.

Meanwhile, Ringo comes to the prison disguised as the owner of a sanitation company, sending in people in with hazmat suits. Pace and Wick enter the prisoners’ bathroom directly above the safe, as if to clean it, while Hope parks a car outside. Wick drills through the safe, fills it with gas then lights it, blowing open its door. Simultaneously, Hope's car explodes to distract the guards.

Afterwards, Pace and Wick remove the gold from the safe room. Just before, Wick photographs it with his phone, attaching it to a security camera inside. Meanwhile, Schultz, realizing the car explosion was a diversion, checks the safe's camera. At first, they only see Wick's photo, but when Schultz cannot zoom in, they discover the deception. Finding the gold is gone, Schultz puts the prison in lockdown. A gurney moves past him, dropping a gold bar. Believing that Pace has used the gurneys and ambulances to move the gold, he orders his men to check them. However, they find nothing.

At the prison, when an unfamiliar sanitation truck passes, Schultz and his men follow it through the desert. It stops in front of the Prince's military plane. He opens the trunk, but finds it empty. Then the Prince, Ringo and two masked others exit the truck. The livid Schultz is calmed when he believes his men have Hope. He gives the kill order, then hangs up. However, Hope removes her mask and introduces herself. Schultz's men had actually tied up Violet, who defeats them and leaves.

When the angry Schultz pulls a gun, the Prince's military aim at him and escort him to Hirawa's car. Although understanding Schultz is not at fault, Hirawa tells him justice must be delivered. A mold was made of Schultz's statue, so Ringo, Wick and two of the Prince's men already in the prison, melted down the gold, creating a gold statue. After painting it, Ringo then removes the statue for repairs from the prison. After reuniting in Abu Dhabi, Hope and Pace officially join the Misfits, as a news report mentions a large donation given to charity and that the price of gold is on the rise.

== Cast ==
- Pierce Brosnan as Richard Pace
- Tim Roth as Werner Schultz
- Nick Cannon as Ringo
- Rami Jaber as The Prince
- Hermione Corfield as Hope Pace
- Jamie Chung as Violet
- Mike Angelo as Wick
- Qais Qandil as Jason Quick
- Mansoor al-Feeli as Abu Hirawa
- Samer al-Masry as Hassan
- Rik Aby as Abdullah

== Production ==
According to Renny Harlin, he and Pierce Brosnan had "been looking for a project to collaborate on for some time". The project was first announced on February 12, 2019, at the Berlin International Film Festival's European Film Market. Filming locations include Abu Dhabi, Dubai and Los Angeles. Principal photography commenced a week later.

== Controversy ==
The film has been controversial in Qatar due to some real life negative references to Qatar to "terror" financing and explicit references to the Muslim Brotherhood as "terrorists" with Yusuf al-Qaradawi as their mastermind. The film is financed as well as co-produced by an Emirati production company, and given the involvement of Emirati media in propagating this narrative against Qatar at least since the first Qatar diplomatic crisis combined with Doha News reporting anti-Qatar plot elements in the film's content. Initially announced as "Coming Soon" in the Qatari subsidiary of Dubai-headquartered Vox Cinemas, the one half of film exhibition duopoly in Qatar, with the other half being Novo Cinemas which is also Dubai-headquartered but wholly owned indirectly by Doha-based Elan Group (through their ownership of its parent Gulf Film, a regional film distributor across West Asia and North Africa dealing mostly in foreign films, including but not limited to Hollywood releases) lending to this being the speculated factor behind them not picking this film up for exhibition not just in Qatar, but across all of the national markets they operated in, including UAE. As the backlash grew with leaked stills from South Korean release leading credence to discord over anti-Qatar "propaganda" embedded in the film, Emirati-owned Vox Cinemas ultimately shelved the film's planned release in Qatar, with press release confirming the move by 1 July 2021, the previously announced release date.

== Release ==
The Misfits had its world premiere in South Korea on June 3, 2021. The Avenue Entertainment in association with Highland Film Group distributed the film in the United States on June 11, 2021.

== Reception ==
On Rotten Tomatoes, the film has an approval score of 17% based on 26 reviews, with an average rating of 3.70/10. On Metacritic, the film has a score of 25 out of 100 based on 11 reviews, indicating "generally unfavorable reviews".

== Accolades ==
Year	Award	Category	Recipient(s)	Result	Ref.
2022	Golden Raspberry Awards	Worst Director	Renny Harlin	Nominated	
2022	Golden Raspberry Awards	Worst Supporting Actor	Nick Cannon	Nominated	
2022	Golden Raspberry Awards	Worst Screenplay	Screenplay by Robert Henny and Kurt Wimmer; Story by Robert Henny	Nominated	
