= Yes or No (film) =

- Theatrical release poster
- Thai: อยากรัก ก็รักเลย
- Directed by: Sarasawadee Wongsompetch
- Screenplay by: Wattana Weerayawattana
- Produced by: Bandit Thongdee
- Starring: Sucharat Manaying; Suppanad Jittaleela
- Production company: Come On Sweet (TH)
- Distributed by: Canon Yuri
- Release date: 16 December 2010 (Thailand)
- Running time: 110 mins
- Country: Thailand
- Language: Thai
- Budget: $400,000 USD

Yes or No (Thai: อยากรัก ก็รักเลย, romanized: Yak Rak Ko Rak Loei; literally "Let's Love As We Wish") is a 2010 Thai romantic comedy-drama film directed by Sarasawadee Wongsompetch, starring Sucharat "Aom" Manaying and Suppanad "Tina" Jitaleela. It is the first lesbian-genre film from Thailand with a "tom" (i.e. butch) lead character.

== Plot ==
Pie comes from an upper middle class Thai family that adheres to traditional thought and customs, including the very vocal disapproval of homosexuality. Kim, on the other hand, carries herself with deliberate masculinity that defies convention and intimidates Pie upon first encounter, so much so that she immediately requests a roommate change which the college promptly denies.

Pie is reluctant to converse or interact with her roommate so she takes tape and draws boundaries in the room to separate her space from Kim's to avoid as much contact as possible. On the first day of class, Kim by chance meets Jane, who is seen still crying after her breakup. Kim offers her a handkerchief and Jane immediately gets smitten by her. Later that week, Jane walks into Pie and Kim's room and is embarrassed and shocked to see Kim. She immediately walks out, then comes back in and drags Pie out in the hallway. Jane confesses that Kim is the girl she has fallen for and uses Pie to get an introduction and thus begins her chase for Kim.

Despite how hard Pie tries to ignore or discourage Kim, the two begin to intermingle when Kim cooks and shares with Pie and the two have a short conversation together. One day Kim receives a package from her father's worker and is told to deliver to Aunt In. She asks Pie to help her get there but Pie hurriedly turns her down and gives her fast directions before walking away. Night time falls and Kim is seen sitting near a lake, completely lost. Pie finds her and offers her to take her to Aunt In but only as a thank you for the food.

That starts a series of moments where the two begin to spend increasingly more time together and soon those “boundary lines” disappear and Pie finds herself drifting away from her then boyfriend, to Kim. The two share many sweet moments, most notably, when Kim took Pie to the park to help her record information for school. The two share a lollipop and Kim in a roundabout way, confesses her attraction to Pie. The latter does not reply but she is seen smiling.

But as Pie's feelings grow, so do those of Jane for Kim, and of P'van for Pie. Because Pie has yet to accept that she may have feelings for Kim, and Kim is reluctant to confess, this triggers mutual jealousy and sadness. When P'van unexpectedly pops up at the school to take Pie out, she tries to turn him down but Jane comes along and invites herself and forces Kim and Pie to accept his offer. During their time together, Pie gets visibly upset at how close Jane is to Kim and tries various times to either make Kim jealous or have them spend time alone. After a failed attempt, she and Jane leave for a moment where P'van talks about Pie's mother and her heavy dislike of homosexuals. He then goes on to say that Kim needs to leave Pie alone because Pie does not like her like that nor will she ever, and then taunts Kim by saying Pie would want the real thing versus silicone (referring to sex). Angry, Kim storms off. When Pie and Jane return they ask for Kim but P'van says he doesn't know what happened.

Pie calls Kim several times throughout the time period and looks all over the mall for her. Eventually she is seen at the dorm with an angry expression. Kim walks in with her hands full of bags, Pie begins to yell at her for leaving and Kim yells back that she had P'van anyway so it did not matter. Pie then yells at Kim for being too close to Jane but rather than announce it was jealousy, says she was disgusted by two girls together. This prompts Kim to dump her bags and leave the room. Regretful, Pie looks through the bags and finds a Jellyfish lamp, something she told Kim she had wanted. She then grabs an umbrella and runs to find Kim. Eventually she finds Kim in a phone booth, soaking wet and shivering. Upon finding her, Kim declares her love for Pie and that she knows though Pie will never love her, she will do so. Pie then drops the umbrella and embraces Kim.

After the confession, the two have their first kiss and begin a relationship together, unbeknownst to anyone. The happiness is short lived though as Pie's mother drops by the dorm. In a rush, Pie tells her mother to go use the restroom while she takes down photos of herself and Kim. Soon after, Pie and her mother sit on the bed and chat. Kim, not knowing Pie's mother is there, walks into the room. Surprised, Kim realizes the situation and pretends to be a student from down the hall asking for her book back from Pie, confused and scared, Pie quickly fumbles for some books and gives them to Kim with a "Thank You". When Kim leaves she leaves the door ajar and listens to the nasty comments Pie's mother makes about her, she begins to cry and walks away.

Shortly after, Kim gets sick. Pie takes care of her but soon has to leave for class, to make sure Kim gets some rest, she gives her some medicine and puts a blindfold over her eyes. Jane learns that Kim is sick and stops to make a visit. She lays next to Kim and begins to massage her. Eventually Pie comes back to the dorm to find Kim and Jane in a romantic position, rubbing and cradling each other. Jane hurriedly get up and Kim takes off her blindfold. Realizing that it was Jane that she was with the entire time, she rushes to explain but Pie begins to cry and throws a glass Jellyfish lamp Kim had bought her on the floor and runs out of the room. Kim tries to go after her but Jane holds onto her, demanding she stays and what is it she and Pie are hiding.

Kim races around the campus, going to all the spots she and Pie would always go too and constantly calling her cellphone but gets sent to voicemail and does not find her. She eventually ends up at Aunt In' who tries to find out what's wrong but Kim receives a phone call from Jane crying for an explanation and threatening to expose Pie and Kim's relationship. After Jane hangs up the phone, she takes out a blade, ready to cut herself. But Nerd shows up and smacks her. Kim runs back to the dorm and find Jane, telling her that she only wanted a friendship with her and that she loves Pie. Eventually the two get to a mutual understanding.

Later, you see that Pie has gone home to her mother and is crying in bed. Her mother, who doesn't know what's going on, is worried that Pie has been crying for so long. After Pie settles down she asks her mother would she be mad if she didn't love P'van, her mother responds that she does not care if Pie doesn't love him. Pie then asks her mother what if she liked someone of the same sex, her mother does not respond but is seen with a shocked expression. Kim finds her way to Pie's home days later and speaks to the mother, confessing how she feels for Pie. The mother rejects her and calls down Pie to either accept Kim or not. Pie is too scared and rejects Kim in front of her mother. Heartbroken, Kim leaves the house.

Kim goes back home to her father and works on the farm. After a few weeks, Pie is seen going to the farm and meets Kim's father. After a short introduction, he tells her where Kim is and she rushes to her. As soon as she spots Kim, she begins to confess her feelings and states that she will openly go against her mother and that she needs Kim in her life. When Kim does not answer, Pie apologizes, saying "I was too late" and turns to leave, crying. Kim stops her with a back hug and thanks Pie for daring to love her. The two then embrace each other in a longing hug with Pie's voice reading off a letter she had left to her mother stating she is sorry but she loves Kim and will continue a relationship with her.

== Cast ==
- Sucharat Manaying - as Pie
- Suppanad Jittaleela - as Kim
- Arisara Tongborisuth - as Jane
- Soranut Yupanun - as P'van
- Intira Youenyong - as Aunt. Inn
- Maneerut Wongjirasak - as Pie's Mother
- Puttipong Promsaka Na Sakolnakorn - as Kim's Father
- Thanapat Sornkoon - as Boy
- Narumon Reanaiprai - as Nerd
- Bandit Thongdee - as Odd
- Sophon Phoonsawat - as Jeab
- Pongsit Phisitthakarn, Nuttapatch Arunsirisakul, Tantong Funyueang, Watchanan Jitpakdee- as Boy Gang Members

== Release ==
Yes or No premiered theatrically in Thailand on 16 December 2010.

=== Home media ===
The DVD for region 3 was released in Thailand by MVD Company Limited on 10 May 2011. The region-free Blu-ray with subtitles in English, French, Spanish, and Portuguese was released by Canon Yuri Films on 1 January 2012.

The film was released as VOD on Netflix in the United States and United Kingdom on 5 December 2018.

== Reception ==
=== Critical response ===
One of Thailand's widely known movie critic websites, filmbiz stated: "Slowly on the heels of gay-male teen movie Love of Siam (รักแห่งสยาม, 2007) comes Thailand's first lesbian romance, Yes or No (Yes or No อยากรักก็รักเลย), a much more path-breaking undertaking in the outwardly permissive but underlyingly very conservative country. Professionally shot on a less than $500,000 budget, with good-looking photography by d.p. Ruengwit Ramasoota (เรืองวิทย์ รามสูต) and a poppy soundtrack that includes one obvious anthem to gay relationships, the movie is tame even by the standards of other Asian countries but gets by on a simple, ingenuous charm that's both very Thai and very necessary (given the nature of its subject)." The film was given 4 and a half out of 5 stars.

=== Accolades ===
Yes or No received the Special Mention jury award at the 2012 Milan International Lesbian and Gay Film Festival.

== Soundtrack ==
In The Eyes
| No. | Title | Performer(s) | Length |
|---|---|---|---|
| 1. | "สบตา (In The Eyes)" | Suppanad Jittaleela & Sucharat Manaying | 3:56 |
| 2. | "ไม่ได้ (Can not)" | Rachawadee | 4:47 |
| 3. | "ถ้าสักวันเธอจะกล าพอ (If One Day You Have The Courage)" | Budokan | 4:17 |
| 4. | "รักระยะไกล (Love Remote)" | Budokan | 2:06 |
| Total length: | | | 14:26 |

== 2012 sequel: Yes or No 2 ==
The sequel Yes or No 2: Come Back to Me (Thai: รักไม่รักอย่ากั๊กเลย, romanized: Rak Mai Rak Ya Kak Loei), also directed by Sarasawadee Wongsompetch with Sucharat Manaying and Suppanad Jittaleela returning in the roles of Pie and Kim, was released on 16 August 2012.

The VOD became available on Netflix in the United States and United Kingdom on 7 November 2018.

== See also ==
- List of LGBT-related films directed by women
- List of Thai films
