= Harit Cheewagaroon =

Thai actor (born 1997)

- หฤษฎ์ ชีวการุณ
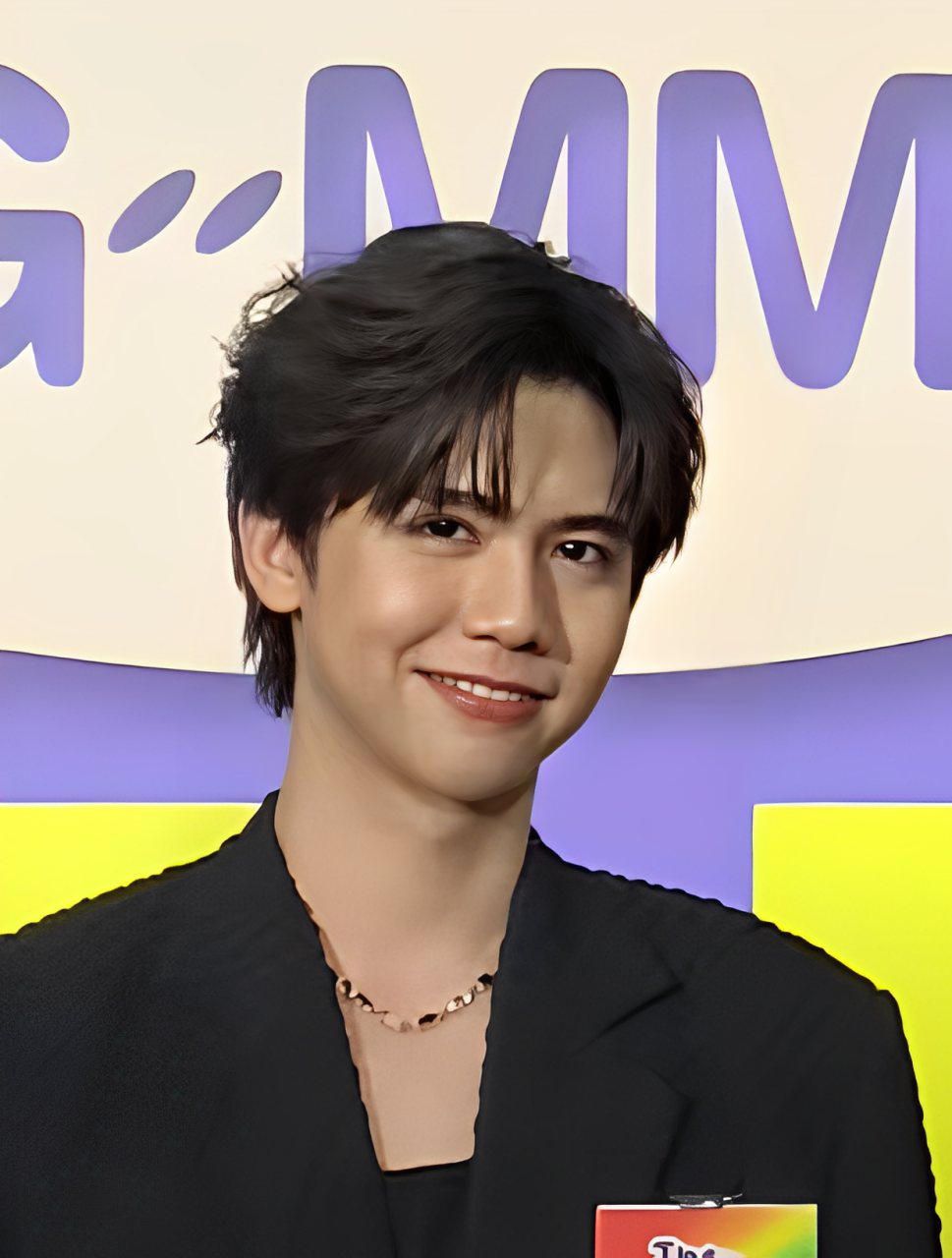
- Harit in November 2024
- Born: 8 March 1997 (age 29); Bangkok, Thailand
- Education: Bangkok University (Faculty of Communication Arts)
- Occupations: Actor; singer
- Years active: 2014–present
- Agent: GMMTV
- Known for: Per in Love Sick; Din in Senior Secret Love: Puppy Honey; Ohm in The Gifted; Rock in Cherry Magic

Harit Cheewagaroon (Thai: หฤษฎ์ ชีวการุณ; born 8 March 1997), nicknamed Sing (Thai: ซิง), is a Thai actor and musician affiliated with GMMTV. He began his acting career in 2014 with a supporting role in as Per in the season one and two of boys' love series Love Sick. He gained further recognition for his portrayal of Ohm in the 2018 series The Gifted and its 2020 sequel The Gifted: Graduation. Harit has also appeared in other notable series such as He's Coming to Me (2019), Not Me (2021), and Cherry Magic (2023). In addition to his acting career, he is a skilled guitarist and has contributed to several series soundtracks.

== Early life and education ==
Harit was born in Bangkok, Thailand. He completed his secondary education at Bangkok Christian College, where he participated and won the top prize in the Siam Kolkarn Family Popular Music The 1st Concert 2012. In 2020, he graduated with a bachelor's degree in communication arts at Bangkok University together with fellow actor Thiti Mahayotaruk (Bank).

== Career ==
He started his acting career in 2014 by playing a support role in Love Sick (2014–2015). He later became part of GMMTV where he played main and support roles in several television series such as Senior Secret Love: Puppy Honey (2016), Slam Dance (2017), The Gifted (2018), and He's Coming To Me (2019).

He recently played the role of GD in One Night Steal (2019) and Chaowat (Pete) in Who Are You (2020).

== Filmography ==
=== Television series ===
Key
| † | Denotes television productions that have not yet been released |

| Year | Title | Role | Notes | Ref. |
|---|---|---|---|---|
| 2014 | Love Sick: Season 1 | Per | Support role | |
| 2015 | Love Sick: Season 2 | Per | Support role | |
| 2016 | Senior Secret Love: Puppy Honey | "Din" Jirawat Phanphothong | Support role | |
| 2016 | Love Songs Love Series: Summer | Kool | Support role | |
| 2016 | Melodies of Life | O | Support role | |
| 2016 | Little Big Dream | —N/a | Guest role | |
| 2017 | Senior Secret Love: Puppy Honey 2 | "Din" Jirawat Phanphothong | Support role | |
| 2017 | Slam Dance | "Nick" Nucknick | Support role | |
| 2017 | My Dear Loser: Edge of 17 | Jued | Support role | |
| 2017 | My Dear Loser: Monster Romance | Jued | Support role | |
| 2017 | My Dear Loser: Happy Ever After | Jued | Guest role | |
| 2018 | The Gifted | "Ohm" Wichai Sai-Ngern | Main role | |
| 2019 | Wolf | Kon | Support role | |
| 2019 | He's Coming To Me | "Golf" Khiewkhem | Support role | |
| 2019 | 3 Will Be Free | James | Support role | |
| 2019 | One Night Steal | GD | Support role | |
| 2020 | Angel Beside Me | —N/a | Guest role | |
| 2020 | Who Are You | "Pete" Chaowat | Support role | |
| 2020 | The Gifted: Graduation | "Ohm" Wichai Sai-Ngern | Main role | |
| 2021 | The Comments | "Pok" Pokpong Komchaiyapruek | Main role | |
| 2021 | Not Me | Tod | Support role | |
| 2021 | The Revenge | Pat Akharaphaisansakul | Support role | |
| 2022 | The Warp Effect | See-ew | Support role | |
| 2023 | UMG (Unidentified Mysterious Girlfriend) | O | Support role | |
| 2023 | Home School | Bodin (young) | Guest role | |
| 2023 | Don't Touch My Gang | Kiao | Main role | |
| 2023 | Cherry Magic | "Rock" Banphot | Support role | |
| 2025 | Us | Kawi Chitrarak | Support role | |
| 2025 | Break Up Service | "Pop" Piya | Guest role | |
| 2025 | That Summer | Mai | Guest role | |
| 2025 | Dare You to Death | Phut | Support role | |
| 2026 | Match Point | Boat Thanweeranan | Support role | |
| TBA | Love's Echoes † | TBA | Support role | |
| TBA | Cupid's Ghost † | Ing | Support role | |
| TBA | The Spooky Love Tale † | TBA | Support role | |

=== Television show ===
| Year | Title | Role | Notes | Ref. |
|---|---|---|---|---|
| 2018 | School Rangers | Himself | Main host | |
| 2018 | Beauty & The Babes My First Date | Himself | Main host | |

== Discography ==
| Year | Song title | Label | Ref. |
|---|---|---|---|
| 2018 | "สู้ซ่า (Soo Za)" together with Fiat Pattadon & Phuwin Tangsakyuen | GMMTV Records | |
| 2020 | "ไม่กลัว (Mai Glua)" together with Krist Perawat & Pluem Purim | GMMTV Records | |
| 2020 | "ไปด้วยกัน..ไหม? (Bpai Duay Gan Mai)" together with Krist Perawat & Pluem Purim | GMMTV Records | |
| 2020 | "ยอดรัก ยอดไลก์ (Yotrak Yotlai)" | GMMTV Records | |

== Fan meetings ==
| Title | Date | Venue | Notes | Ref. |
|---|---|---|---|---|
| Us Final EP. Fan Meeting | April 5, 2025 | Siam Pavalai Royal Grand Theater, Siam Paragon | With Us cast | |
| Dare You to Death Final EP. Fan Meeting | February 26, 2026 | Centralworld Pulse Hall, Centralworld | With Dare You to Death cast | |
| Match Point: The First Match | July 26, 2026 | World Max Cinema, SF World Cinema, CentralWorld | With Match Point cast | |
| Match Point: Message Box | September 29, 2026 | Union Hall, Union Mall | With Match Point cast | |

== Concerts ==
| Title | Date | Venue | Notes | Ref. |
|---|---|---|---|---|
| Nanon Born to BEO Concert | March 23, 2024 | Thunder Dome, Muang Thong Thani | With Nanon, Chimon, Tu, Louis, Jorin | |
| JuniorMark ShineRise Fancon | August 12, 2025 | Union Hall, Union Mall | With Junior, Mark, Jan, Force, Book | |
