= Slam Dance =

Slam Dance may refer to:

- Slam Dance (film), a 1987 film
- Slam Dance (TV series), a 2017 Thai television series
- Slamdancing, also known as Moshing
