= Purim (disambiguation) =

Purim is a Jewish holiday.

Purim may also refer to:

- Flora Purim, Brazilian jazz singer
- Purim Rattanaruangwattana, Thai actor
