= Love Flight =

2015 Thai television series

- Official series poster
- Thai: Love Flight – รักสุดท้ายที่ปลายฟ้า
- Genre: Romance; Drama
- Created by: GMMTV
- Directed by: Ekkasit Trakulkasemsuk
- Starring: Puttichai Kasetsin; Ungsumalynn Sirapatsakmetha
- Country of origin: Thailand
- Original language: Thai
- No. of episodes: 4

Production
- Running time: 24 minutes
- Production company: GMMTV

Original release
- Network: GMM 25
- Release: 10 October – 31 October 2015

Love Flight (Thai: Love Flight – รักสุดท้ายที่ปลายฟ้า; Love Flight – Rak Sutthai Thi Plai Fa) is a 2015 Thai television series starring Puttichai Kasetsin (Push) and Ungsumalynn Sirapatsakmetha (Pattie).

Directed by Ekkasit Trakulkasemsuk and produced by GMMTV, the series premiered on GMM 25 on 10 October 2015, airing on Saturdays at 18:30 ICT. The series concluded on 31 October 2015.

== Cast and characters ==
Below are the cast of the series:

=== Main ===
- Puttichai Kasetsin (Push) as Neumake / Make
- Ungsumalynn Sirapatsakmetha (Pattie) as Plaifah / Fah

=== Supporting ===
- Korapat Kirdpan (Nanon) as Ah Pat
- Kejmanee Wattanasin as Savitree
- Daweerit Chullasapya (Pae)
- Warapun Nguitragool as Pongsri
- Suporn Sangkaphibal as a grandmother
- Sutthipha Kongnawdee (Noon) as Phraeo
