= He's Coming to Me =

2019 Thai television series

- Promotional poster
- Also known as: Come to Me
- Thai: เขามาเชงเม้งข้างๆ หลุมผมครับ
- Genre: Boys' love; Romantic fantasy; Mystery fiction; Comedy; Drama
- Created by: GMMTV
- Directed by: Noppharnach Chaiwimol
- Starring: Prachaya Ruangroj; Pawat Chittsawangdee
- Opening theme: "ให้รักปรากฏตัว" (Hai Ruk Pra Got Tua) by Trai Bhumiratna
- Country of origin: Thailand
- Original language: Thai
- No. of episodes: 8

Production
- Running time: 65 minutes
- Production company: GMMTV

Original release
- Network: LINE TV
- Release: 7 March – 25 April 2019

He's Coming to Me (Thai: เขามาเชงเม้งข้างๆ หลุมผมครับ; RTGS: Khao Ma Chengmeng Khang Khang Lum Phom Khrap), also known as Come to Me, is a 2019 Thai BL television series starring Prachaya Ruangroj and Pawat Chittsawangdee. Directed by Aof Noppharnach and produced by GMMTV, the series was one of the thirteen television series for 2019 launched by GMMTV in their "Wonder Th13teen" event on 5 November 2018. It premiered on LINE TV on 7 March 2019, airing on Thursdays at 20:00 ICT. The series concluded on 25 April 2019.

== Synopsis ==
Mes (Prachaya Ruangroj) died over 20 years ago with no one ever looking after his grave. Now, living as a ghost, all he does is sit and lie all day waiting for someone to visit him during the Qingming day — an event which happens only once in every year. Until one day, a boy named Thun (Nattapat Nimjirawat), together with his father, visits the cemetery. He comes across Mes's untended grave and decides to offer some food. He promises to come back every year until Med discovers that the now teenage Thun (Pawat Chittsawangdee) can actually see him. Thun's attention makes Mes feel good about their relationship through their travels until such time that he gets to stay in Thun's dorm. Despite living in two different worlds, Thun's affection towards him fuels his desire to find out the truth on the mystery surrounding his death.

== Cast and characters ==
=== Main ===
- Prachaya Ruangroj (Singto) as Wongsakorn Thanarungsiri (Med)
- Pawat Chittsawangdee (Ohm) as teenage Thun Thunyakorn
  - Nattapat Nimjirawat (Mac) as child Thun Thunyakorn

=== Supporting ===
- Wachirawit Ruangwiwat (Chimon) as Prince
- Harit Cheewagaroon (Sing) as Khiaokhiem
- Sarocha Burintr (Gigie) as Praifah Thanarungsiri (Prai)
- Intira Charoenpura as adult Kwan Thunyakorn
  - Pattranite Limpatiyakorn (Love) as teenage Kwan Thunyakorn
- Chanagun Arpornsutinan (Gunsmile) as Jeng
- Suttatip Wutchaipradit (Ampere) as Ngoon
- Sivakorn Lertchuchot (Guy) as Chin
- Chayapol Jutamas (AJ) as JJ
- Chayakorn Jutamas (JJ) as Eak
- Ohmda Piyawahnit as Nom
- Suchao Phongwilai as Prai's Grandfather

== Soundtrack ==
Song title	Romanized title	Artist	Ref.
"ให้รักปรากฏตัว"	Hai Ruk Pra Got Tua	Trai Bhumiratna (Boy)	
"ให้รักปรากฏตัว"	Hai Ruk Pra Got Tua (Cover Version)	Prachaya Ruangroj (Singto)	
"Weed" (Note: Only for the Philippine-dubbed version of the said series.)	N/A	Miguel Odron	

== Awards and nominations ==
Award	Year	Category	Recipient(s) and nominee(s)	Result	Ref.
LINE TV Awards	2020	Best Dramatic Scene	Prachaya Ruangroj and Pawat Chittsawangdee	Won	
