= I Love 'A Lot Of' You =

2025 Thai television series

- Official series poster
- Thai: รัก มาก เธอ
- Genre: Romantic comedy
- Created by: Kamthorn Lorjitramnuay; Puchong Tuntisungwaragul
- Directed by: Kamthorn Lorjitramnuay
- Starring: Atitaya Tribudarak; Korapat Kirdpan
- Country of origin: Thailand
- Original language: Thai
- No. of episodes: 12

Production
- Executive producers: Sataporn Panichraksapong; Darapa Choeysanguan
- Cinematography: Pathomwat Wansukprasert
- Running time: 41–47 minutes
- Production companies: GMMTV; Parbdee Taweesuk

Original release
- Network: GMM 25; Netflix
- Release: 17 May – 2 August 2025

I Love 'A Lot Of' You (Thai: รัก มาก เธอ; RTGS: Rak Mak Thoe) is a Thai romantic comedy television series starring Korapat Kirdpan (Nanon) and Atitaya Tribudarak (Mind). Directed by Kamthorn Lorjitramnuay (Hlung) and produced by GMMTV together with Parbdee Taweesuk, it was announced at the GMMTV 2025: Riding the Wave event held on 26 November 2024. It premiered on GMM 25 and Netflix on 17 May 2025 and concluded on 2 August 2025.

== Synopsis ==
Sun (Korapat Kirdpan), a Casanova who works as a professional heartbreaker, is hired recently to charm Sairung (Atitaya Tribudarak), an intriguing online news agency reporter with a gorgeous figure. But during the next few days, Sairung's personality changed. Sairung becomes indifferent, cold and unfriendly. Most importantly, she doesn't remember Sun at all even though they just met yesterday. After some research, Sun learns that Sairung's symptoms are similar to people with dissociative identity disorder. Later it's revealed that she has five different personalities. Prior to all of that, Theppachai (Yuthana Boonorm), Sairung's biological father, accidentally discovers the integrative personality theory, which states that if the five personalities "love" the same person, they will merge back into one. Therefore, Theppachai employs Sun to help his daughter. Thus, Sun must unleash all of his skills in order to win Sairung's heart with her five personalities.

== Cast and characters ==
=== Main ===
- Atitaya Tribudarak (Mind) as Sairung / Fahsai / Prai-Fon / Storm / Marnmok
- Korapat Kirdpan (Nanon) as Sun

=== Supporting ===
- Panachai Sriariyarungruang (Junior) as Pat
- Nachcha Chuedang (Parn) as Gudji
- Thanawin Teeraphosukarn (Louis) as De
- Yuthana Boonorm (Ted) as Theppachai (Sairung's dad)

=== Guest ===
- Teeradech Vitheepanich (Tee) as Chin (Ep. 1)
- Apasiri Nitibhon (Um) as Sairung's mother
- Pijika Jittaputta (Lookwa) as Sun's mother
- Suphakorn Sriphotong (Pod) as Joe

== Soundtrack ==
Song title	English title	Artist	Ref.
ฉันก็ยังชอบมองท้องฟ้าอยู่ดี	Stratocumulus	Nanon Korapat	
