= The Gifted (Thai TV series) =

2018 Thai television series

- Official series poster
- Thai: The Gifted – นักเรียนพลังกิฟต์
- Genre: Science fantasy; Suspense
- Created by: GMMTV; Parbdee Taweesuk
- Based on: The Gifted (ภารกิจลับ นักเรียนพลังกิฟต์) by Dhammarong Sermrittirong
- Directed by: Patha Thongpan; Dhammarong Sermrittirong; Waasuthep Ketpetch; Jarupat Kannula
- Starring: Korapat Kirdpan; Wachirawit Ruangwiwat; Ladapa Thongkham; Harit Cheewagaroon; Methika Jiranorraphat; Atthaphan Phunsawat; Pattadon Janngeon; Napasorn Weerayuttvilai; Chayapol Jutamas; Chayakorn Jutamas
- Country of origin: Thailand
- Original language: Thai
- No. of episodes: 13

Production
- Executive producer: Sataporn Panichraksapong
- Producer: Parbdee Taweesuk
- Running time: 50 minutes
- Production companies: GMMTV; Parbdee Taweesuk

Original release
- Network: One31; LINE TV; GMM 25 (Rerun)
- Release: 5 August – 4 November 2018

Related
- The Gifted: Graduation

The Gifted (Thai: The Gifted – นักเรียนพลังกิฟต์; The Gifted – Nakrian Phalang Gift, lit. The Gifted: Students With Special Powers) is a 2018 Thai television series starring Korapat Kirdpan (Nanon), Wachirawit Ruangwiwat (Chimon), Ladapa Thongkham (Lilly), Harit Cheewagaroon (Sing), Methika Jiranorraphat (Jane), Atthaphan Phunsawat (Gun), Pattadon Janngeon (Fiat), Napasorn Weerayuttvilai (Puimek), Chatchawit Techarukpong (Victor), Chayapol Jutamas (AJ), and Chayakorn Jutamas (JJ). Based on the 2015 short film The Gifted and the novel The Gifted by Dhammarong Sermrittirong (SandOtnim), the series follows a low-class student who is accelerated to an elite, secretive program where students are trained to discover and develop their supernatural abilities.

Produced by GMMTV and Parbdee Taweesuk, the series aired on One31 and Line TV from 5 August 2018 to 4 November 2018, and received highest ratings among that year's teenage series in Thailand. Its sequel, The Gifted: Graduation, premiered in September 2020.

== Synopsis ==
Pawaret "Pang" Sermrittirong (Korapat Kirdpan) is a struggling, ordinary tenth grade student in Ritdha High School. Here, a classification system is strictly implemented wherein students are divided into classes based on academic excellence. Pang is in Class VIII, the lowest level, and has no hopes of rising up the hierarchy.

But everything turns haywire for Pang when he unexpectedly sees the school's Placement Exam, which gives low-class students a chance to step up in their game. Adding to the mystery, he is accelerated to the "Gifted Program," the highest and most special class in school where only a handful of students are accepted. As he goes through their first sessions, Pang starts to feel something strange about the Gifted Program. Soon, he and his Gifted classmates unleash their long-hidden potentials: supernatural and superhuman abilities that stem from their personalities and behavior.

What lies ahead of Pang and his fellow Gifted is a thrilling journey of developing their potentials, discovering the horrible secret behind the Program, and breaking down the system that has been torturing students for generations.

== Cast and characters ==
=== Main ===
- Korapat Kirdpan (Nanon) as Pawaret Sermrittirong (Pang)

Head Student of Ritdha High School's Gifted Program; the drama's main protagonist. Pang was once a struggling student from Class VIII who is soon to be accelerated to the Gifted Program — and become the very first Gifted student from Class VIII — through the school's Placement Exam. Through the Gifted Program, he discovers he has the power of mind control, in which he can compel someone to do whatever he wishes through physical contact with the subject and feeling their heartbeat. He becomes the Gifted Program's Head Student when Director Chueamanee removed Wave from the position after the class' midterm exams. He is close with fellow Gifted students Namtaan and Ohm. He is a subject of Wave's enmity, but later he became partners with him in fighting against the Director.

- Wachirawit Ruangwiwat (Chimon) as Wasuthorn Worachotmethee (Wave)

A student of Ritdha High School's Gifted Program from Class I. Through the Program, Wave discovers his power of technopathy, the ability to control and manipulate electronic machines through contact, a gift associated with his advanced skills in mathematics, computers, and programming. He was the Program's Head Student upon Punn's resignation but was ousted by Director Chueamanee after their midterms. He is apparently rude and arrogant, and hates when other students seem to overshadow him. Wave is particularly hostile to Pang, but later he became partners with him in fighting against the Director. His over-competitiveness was triggered by his bad relationship with his former teacher and crush Ms. Nara, who groomed him and took advantage of him by stealing his thesis and framing him for plagiarism.

- Ladapa Thongkham (Lilly) as Chayanit Prachkarit (Namtarn)

A student of Ritdha High School's Gifted Program from Class I. Namtaan discovers her power of psychometry, the ability to see or hear associated events on an object through contact, a gift associated on her character of being nosy. Namtaan has primary hypertension which limits her in using her psychometry in its full extent. She is close to Pang and Ohm.

- Harit Cheewagaroon (Sing) as Wichai Sai-Ngern (Ohm)

A student of Ritdha High School's Gifted Program from Class II. Ohm has a form of psychokinesis which enables him to make objects (including humans) disappear and bringing them back again by will, which soon evolves to include invisibility and teleportation (of himself and other humans). This power is associated with his character of being forgetful and losing things most of the time. When using his power, Ohm experiences nosebleeds which indicate that his power has manifested. He is close to Pang and Namtaan, and is known for being the lively one in the Gifted class.

- Methika Jiranorraphat (Jane) as Irin Jaratpun (Claire)

A student of Ritdha High School's Gifted Program from Class I and member of the Drama Club. Claire has a form of synesthesia which enables her to see a person's aura and associate the color of the aura with a certain kind of emotion (orange for happiness, blue for sadness, red for anger, pink for love, yellow for confidence, green for loathing, purple for fear). Her power is associated with her passion for acting. She is Punn's love interest and Korn's childhood friend.

- Atthaphan Phunsawat (Gun) as Punn Taweesilp

A student of Ritdha High School's Gifted Program from Class I. Punn has the power of imitation and ability mastering, which enables him to perfectly copy a skill by watching or studying but causes him to develop multiple personalities (his normal self, the leader, the paranoid, the belligerent, and the suicidal). His power is associated with his perfectionism, being an academic achiever and his eagerness to learn different things. He was elected as Head Student of the Gifted class until his resignation. He is Claire's love interest.

- Pattadon Janngeon (Fiat) as Thanakorn Gorbgoon (Korn)

A student of Ritdha High School's Gifted Program from Class I. Korn has the ability to remain awake for days without getting sleepy. He has a crush on his childhood friend Claire, until Claire rejected his love. His passion for photography leads him to intimately associating with Koi who, unbeknownst to him, is acting upon orders from Mrs. Ladda to gather information about the Gifted Program.

- Napasorn Weerayuttvilai (Puimek) as Patchamon Pitiwongkorn (Mon)

A student of Ritdha High School's Gifted Program from Class II and member of the Martial Arts Club. Mon possesses superhuman strength with enhanced agility, dexterity and coordination that is useful for combat. Her potential is associated with her passion for sports. However, her body produces pheromones that are excreted through her sweat and tears. Once exposed to it, a person would turn insane, violent and, worse, murderous. She is Art's love interest.

- Chatchawit Techarukpong (Victor) as Porama Wongrattana (Pom)

The class adviser of Ritdha High School's Gifted Program. Mr. Pom belongs to Ritdha High School's Gifted Program Batch 3, and decided to work as a teacher in Ritdha after graduating. He has the power of memory manipulation which enables him to erase memories, first, by putting the subject in hypnosis using sound with a regular tempo (through a metronome) and snapping his fingers, and second, by touching the subject's head while it is in hypnotic state. He is also able to both erase and restore his own memories. His power is associated with his ability to memorize many details. As a teacher, his power is taken into advantage by Director Chueamanee in erasing the memories of students who are involved in incidents related to the Gifted Program.

- Chayapol Jutamas (AJ) as Chanuj Saeliu (Jack)
- Chayakorn Jutamas (JJ) as Chanet Saeliu (Jo)

The identical twin students of Ritdha High School's Gifted Program from Class III. Jack and Jo have the ability to respond to stimuli in sync.

- Katreeya English as Ladda Ngamkul

Head administrator of Ritdha High School. Mrs. Ladda is the school disciplinarian and is primarily viewed as a terrible person by the students due to her strict and serious enforcement of punishments.

- Wanchana Sawasdee (Bird) as Supot Chueamanee

The Director of Ritdha High School and master of the Gifted Program; the drama's main antagonist. Director Chueamanee designed the Gifted Program to search for and train young people who had evolved to develop supernatural or superhuman abilities. He strongly believes in a society where the strong leads the weaker or inferior ones, as reflected in the school's student hierarchy system, his abusive treatment of low-class students, and his bias towards the Gifted. He has the same, but stronger and evolved, mind control power as Pang. Since he and Pang have the same power, they cannot use their powers against each other.

=== Supporting ===
- Wanwimol Jaenasavamethee as Rawin "Koi" Boonrak

A Class III student and videographer of the Journalism Club. After her friend Mamuang had become mad due to Mon's pheromones, she decides to act under secret orders from Mrs. Ladda to gather information about the Gifted Program. She makes Korn fall in love with her, in her attempt to gather confidential information and expose the Gifted, which she fails to do.

- Pumipat Paiboon as Pakorn "Nac" Meechoke

Pang's former best friend and dorm roommate from Class I who aspires to get into the Gifted Program. He is a member of the Martial Arts Club.

- Suthita Kornsai as Mamuang

Reporter and host of the school's news blog.

- Pumrapee Raksachat as Folk

Ohm's former best friend, whom Ohm had accidentally made invisible.

- Duangkamol Sukkawatwiboon as Chayanee Prachkarit

Namtaan's mother

- Praeploy Oree as Pangrum

Member of the Drama Club and Claire's fake friend.

- Chatchanut Prapaweewattananon as Best

Student leader and stage director of the Drama Club.

- Thanakorn Ponwannapongsa as Fluk

Member of the Drama Club.

- Manatchaya Phutthakao as Chaem

Member and costume designer of the Drama Club.

- Thongchai Pimapansree as Art

Student leader of the Martial Arts Club and Mon's love interest.

- Rapee Pattanacharoen as Duke

An applicant for the Martial Arts Club who was later evicted for being a perverted bra-stealer. He accidentally threw Mon's used towel on an air conditioning unit which triggered the Martial Arts Club members to turn violent.

- Tipnapa Chaipongpat as Jane

Member of the Martial Arts Club and was the first exposed to Mon's pheromone.

=== Guest ===
- Supakan Benjaarruk as Nicha Kannula

The first student of the Gifted Program. Nicha possesses antibodies that can excellently block any pathogens, making her body heal from all germ and viral infections. Her potential is associated with her passion for chemistry. Her body can also neutralize poison, saving her from being killed by her classmate and research partner Wipawee, whom she had killed in an incident in the school rooftop. Her murder of Wipawee becomes of subject of the current Gifted batch's midterm examination.

- Nattamon Thongchiew as Wipawee Suwannaparn

Nicha's classmate and research partner who tried to poison Nicha and everyone in the school. Wipawee fell to her death in a fight with Nicha after she was caught by Ms. Ladda on the rooftop of a school building.

- Jirakit Thawornwong as Chanon "Non" Taweepong

Mr. Pom's batchmate in the Gifted Program Batch 3 and the first Gifted student to be eliminated from the program. Non has the power of high-accuracy calculation, which is associated with his passion for astronomy. He attempts to expose Director Chueamanee's dangerous experiments on Pom's memory manipulation using actual students (from the lower classes) as subjects, but in order to prevent officials from implicating Pom in the crime, he forged Pom's profile by putting his own name. Upon Director Chueamanee's orders, his memories are erased by Pom, who is unknowing of his sacrifice. After the incident, his records were removed from official yearbooks but were recovered by Namtaan's psychometry, leading to Namtaan (and, later, Pang and Wave) investigating on the conspiracy behind the Gifted Program.

- Rangsiwut Chalopathump as Prof. Dr. Premchai Taweesilp

Punn's father and Deputy Permanent Secretary of the Thailand's Ministry of Education.

- Sarunthorn Klaiudom as Narathawi "Nara" Watthanakun

A teacher from Wave's former school; Wave's former love interest. Ms. Nara inspired Wave to develop his skills in math and programming. But when Wave developed feelings for her, she tricked Wave into joining a research competition, stole his thesis, and later framed him of plagiarism. She was fired from her job after the vengeful Wave exposed her "bought" degree diploma. Her trickery triggered Wave into becoming a rude, arrogant, and over-competitive student among his Ritdha and Gifted classmates.

== Episodes ==
| No. | Title | Directed by | Original release date |
|---|---|---|---|
| 1 | "Episode 1" | Patha Thongpan | 5 August 2018 |
Pang, a struggling tenth grade student, is accelerated to the Gifted Program despite being from Class VIII, the school's lowest level. He feels confused about the program and risks losing his Class I friend Nac. Using his potential, Wave uncovers the main secret about the Gifted Program.
| 2 | "Episode 2" | Dhammarong Sermrittirong | 19 August 2018 (Note: No episode was aired in 12 August. Episode 2, which was supposed to be aired on that date if the regular Sundays schedule was followed, was aired on 19 August, the Sunday of the following week.) |
Director Chueamanee explains to the Gifted students the nature of the Gifted Program. Some of the Gifted students share to the class each of, what they believe are, their hidden potentials. Ohm discovers his own in a near-traumatic incident with his former friend Folk.
| 3 | "Episode 3" | Waasuthep Ketpetch | 26 August 2018 |
Pang and Namtaan discover an anomaly in the Gifted Program's record of students. Using her psychometry at the cost of her health, Namtaan investigates on the possibility of a Gifted student resigning from the program.
| 4 | "Episode 4" | Dhammarong Sermrittirong | 2 September 2018 |
Sassy synesthete Claire risks losing her love interest Punn and her status as one of the prettiest girls in school when an internet troll threatens her with a racy video of her not-so-beautiful past self. Using her potential, she thinks the culprit is hiding among her fellow Drama Club members.
| 5 | "Episode 5" | Waasuthep Ketpetch | 9 September 2018 |
Confident with his powers of imitation and ability mastering, the Gifted class' Head Student Punn volunteers to join in all events of the Academic Excellence Competition. He aces nearly all contests, but beneath his success lies a dark secret.
| 6 | "Episode 6" | Dhammarong Sermrittirong | 16 September 2018 |
Wave takes the Head Student position upon Punn's resignation, proposing harsh sanctions for slackers. Mon and Art clash against their fellow Martial Arts Club members who suddenly turned violent and zombie-like. Pang unexpectedly unleashes his power over his former friend Nac.
| 7 | "Episode 7" | Waasuthep Ketpetch | 23 September 2018 |
Mrs. Ladda orders Koi of the Journalism Club to dig up confidential information about the Gifted Program. Getting over Claire's rejection, Korn finds new love with Koi, unknowing of her ulterior motives.
| 8 | "Episode 8" | Patha Thongpan | 30 September 2018 |
Wave eavesdrops on Mr. Pom and Director Chueamanee's conversation about Pang. During their specialized midterm exam, the Gifted students play detective to understand an old spooky legend about their school, which turns out to be a real case that happened long ago. When Wave apparently aces the exam, Pang digs deeper and discovers more about the case.
| 9 | "Episode 9" | Jarupat Kannula | 7 October 2018 |
The school's records have been hacked, Ms. Ladda's office has been ransacked, and handyman tools have been stolen from the warehouse. Mr. Pom and the Gifted students have no other person to suspect but the technopathic Wave. As Namtaan checks up on Wave, she learns about his painful past.
| 10 | "Episode 10" | Jarupat Kannula | 14 October 2018 |
Driven by his past and his over-competitiveness towards Pang and the other Gifted, Wave resolves to prove his superiority through an expertly orchestrated school shutdown. Pang and the remaining Gifted students work together to stop him.
| 11 | "Episode 11" | Dhammarong Sermrittirong | 21 October 2018 |
Mon and Korn wish to resign from the Gifted Program and become normal students. As the Director reprimands Mr. Pom about his handling of the Gifted students, Pang and Wave join hands to bring the Director down and break the status quo. Along the way, they make an ally and a strong enemy.
| 12 | "Episode 12" | Patha Thongpan | 28 October 2018 |
As the other Gifted students take on their final mission of the semester, Pang and Wave hunt down the folder containing the evidences they can use to bring Director Chueamanee down. Mr. Pom faces a painful revelation.
| 13 | "Episode 13" | Patha Thongpan | 4 November 2018 |
In a board meeting with the Ministry of Education, Pang confronts Director Chueamanee and, with Wave's help, exposes the Director's crimes to the officials. Pang and Wave's plan takes an ugly twist.

== Production ==
The Gifted is based on Dhammarong Sermrittirong's thesis short film of the same name, which was originally shown at the 2015 film festival of the Faculty of Communication Arts, Chulalongkorn University. Dhammarong also adapted the film into a novel, writing under the pen name Sandotnim, before it was picked up by GMMTV and production affiliate Parbdee Taweesuk. Dhammarong directs the series along with Patha Thongpan, Waasuthep Ketpetch and Jarupat Kannula. The series was announced by GMMTV on 1 February 2018, as part of its lineup for that year.

== Release and reception ==
The Gifted originally aired on Sundays, at 22:00 ICT on One31, from 5 August to 4 November 2018. It was also available through online streaming via LINE TV, following each TV broadcast, at 23:00 ICT. A rerun of the series was also broadcast on Mondays and Tuesdays at 22:45 ICT on GMM 25 starting 25 February 2020.

The series received popular responses online, consistently becoming the top trending topic for Thailand on Twitter during its broadcasts. It achieved ratings of 0.7, which was the year's highest among Thai teenage series.

Two original songs were released as the series' soundtrack: "Lutphon" (หลุดพ้น) by Q (Suveera Boonrod) and "Mai Mi Khamsanya" (ไม่มีคำสัญญา) by Chart (Suchart Saeheng)

It was announced on 15 October 2019 that the series will be having its sequel, The Gifted: Graduation, wherein most of the main cast will reprise their roles. It premiered on 6 September 2020.

== Accolades ==
| Year | Award | Date of ceremony | Category | Recipient | Result | Ref. |
|---|---|---|---|---|---|---|
| 2019 | LINE TV Awards | 12 February 2019 | Best Fight Scene | Atthaphan Phunsawat | Won | |
| 2019 | 25th Shanghai Television Festival Magnolia Awards | 14 June 2019 | Best Foreign TV Series / Serial | The Gifted | Nominated | |
| 2019 | 10th Nataraja Awards | 21 July 2019 | Best Cinematography | Wongwattana Chunhavuttiyanon | Nominated | |
| 2019 | 24th Asian Television Awards | 11 January 2020 | Best Actor in a Leading Role | Korapat Kirdpan | Nominated | |
| 2019 | 24th Asian Television Awards | 11 January 2020 | Best Actor in a Supporting Role | Atthaphan Phunsawat | Won | |
| 2019 | 24th Asian Television Awards | 11 January 2020 | Best Original Screenplay | The Gifted | Nominated | |
