= Baker Boys (Thai TV series) =

2021 Thai television series

- Official series poster
- Thai: รักของผม ขนมของคุณ
- Genre: Romantic comedy; Mystery
- Based on: Antique Bakery by Fumi Yoshinaga
- Directed by: Pannares Ruchiranantal
- Starring: Thanat Lowkhunsombat; Prachaya Ruangroj; Purim Rattanaruangwattana; Patara Eksangkul
- Ending theme: "Sweet Day" by Lee Thanat, Singto Prachaya, Pluem Purim and Foei Patara
- Country of origin: Thailand
- Original language: Thai
- No. of seasons: 1

Production
- Running time: 45 minutes
- Production company: GMMTV

Original release
- Network: GMM 25; AIS Play
- Release: 24 November – 30 December 2021

Related
- Antique (2008, South Korea)

Baker Boys (Thai: รักของผม ขนมของคุณ; RTGS: Rak Khong Phom, Khanom Khong Khun, lit. My Love, Your Desserts) is a 2021 Thai romantic comedy-drama television series starring Thanat Lowkhunsombat (Lee), Prachaya Ruangroj (Singto), Purim Rattanaruangwattana (Pluem) and Patara Eksangkul (Foei). Adapted from the manga series Antique Bakery by Fumi Yoshinaga, it tells the stories of four bakers who go through different challenges in life while on the baking industry. It's also the Thai version of the Japanese and South Korean franchises.

Directed by Pannares Ruchiranantal (Poy) and produced by GMMTV, this series is one of sixteen television series of GMMTV for 2021 during their "GMMTV 2021: The New Decade Begins" event on 3 December 2020. It is currently airing every Wednesday and Thursday at 20:30 (8:30 pm) on GMM25, and the streaming app AIS PLAY at 22:30 (10:30 pm), replacing the timeslot of reruns of Nabi, My Stepdarling. It was succeeded by 55:15 Never Too Late on its timeslot on GMM25.

== Synopsis ==
Punn, the son of a billionaire, owns a popular bakery and credits success to Weir, the "God of Pastry." Despite his lack of interest, Punn attracts customers worldwide. Krathing, an apprentice, and Pooh, Punn's personal bodyguard, serve as his staff. Monet, a reporter, investigates the mysterious disappearances of young people from the store and uncovers a secret.

== Cast and characters ==
=== Main ===
- Thanat Lowkhunsombat (Lee) as Punnapat Detrachatanan (Punn) / Manga character: Keiichiro Tachibana. He is the owner of the Sweet Day Cafe, the area that would eventually be the vital part of the child-abduction case.
- Prachaya Ruangroj (Singto) as Warakron Chanwanit (Weir) / Manga character: Yūsuke Ono. He is a pastry chef that was hired by Punn in his new business.
- Purim Rattanaruangwattana (Pluem) as Tadtep Udommana (Krathing) / Manga character: Eiji Kanda. He is a retired boxer due to a medical condition who was hired by Punn in the café via a 3-month probation.
- Patara Eksangkul (Foei) as Pooh / Manga character: Chikage Kobayakawa. A bodyguard of Punn that was falsely pointed out as one of the suspects in the kidnapping of the child by Krathing and Monet.

=== Supporting ===
- Juthapich Indrajundra (Jamie) as Monet, an internet journalist who is investigating the child-abduction case along with her parents
- Oliver Pupart (An) as Manop, Monet's father who is also a reporter.
- Apasiri Nitibhon (Um) as Rochi, Monet's mother who is also a reporter.
- Athiwat Sanitwong Na Ayutthaya (Ton) as Chok
- Khoo Pei-Cong (Wave) as Jean
- Akkarin Akaranithimetrath (Joke) as Ted
- Kulteera Yordchang (Unda) as Piglet
- Phromphiriya Thongputtaruk (Papang) as Tum Tam
- Neen Suwanamas as Im-aim
- Ployphat Phatchatorn Thanawat as View
- Suratnawee Suwiporn (Bow) as Tiwa
- Sobee Chotirot Kaewpinit as Nuan
- Kalaya Lerdkasemsap (Ngek) as Weir's mom

==== Guest ====
- Thanaboon Wanlopsirinun (Na) as the host of the contest
- Chatchawit Techarukpong (Victor) as Pob - Krating's boxing rival
- Noppharnach Chaiwimol (Backaof)
- Chinnarat Siriphongchawalit (Mike) as Noom - Weir's teacher

== Reception ==
=== Thailand television ratings ===
- In the table below, the blue number represents the lowest ratings and the red number represents the highest ratings.

Episode No.	Timeslot (UTC+07:00)	Air date	Average audience share	Ref.
1	Wednesdays-Thursdays, 8:30 pm	24 November 2021	0.135	
2	Wednesdays-Thursdays, 8:30 pm	25 November 2021	0.107	
3	Wednesdays-Thursdays, 8:30 pm	1 December 2021	0.084	
4	Wednesdays-Thursdays, 8:30 pm	2 December 2021	0.034	
5	Wednesdays-Thursdays, 8:30 pm	8 December 2021	0.078	
6	Wednesdays-Thursdays, 8:30 pm	9 December 2021	0.075	
7	Wednesdays-Thursdays, 8:30 pm	15 December 2021	0.131	
8	Wednesdays-Thursdays, 8:30 pm	16 December 2021	0.042	
9	Wednesdays-Thursdays, 8:30 pm	22 December 2021	0.090	
10	Wednesdays-Thursdays, 8:30 pm	23 December 2021	0.093	
11	Wednesdays-Thursdays, 8:30 pm	29 December 2021		
12	Wednesdays-Thursdays, 8:30 pm	30 December 2021		
Average			— ^{1}	

^1 Based on the average audience share per episode.
