= The Gifted: Graduation =

2020 Thai television series

- Official series poster
- Genre: Science fantasy; Suspense
- Created by: GMMTV
- Based on: The Gifted (ภารกิจลับ นักเรียนพลังกิฟต์) by Dhammarong Sermrittirong
- Directed by: Waasuthep Ketpetch
- Starring: Korapat Kirdpan; Wachirawit Ruangwiwat; Harit Cheewagaroon; Pattadon Janngeon; Atthaphan Phunsawat; Methika Jiranorraphat; Napasorn Weerayuttvilai; Nattawat Finkler; Chanikarn Tangkabodee; Phuwin Tangsakyuen
- Country of origin: Thailand
- Original language: Thai
- No. of episodes: 13

Production
- Producers: Kamthorn Lorjitramnuay; Puchong Tuntisungwaragul; Patha Thongpan; Watthana Rujirojsakul
- Production companies: GMMTV; Parbdee Taweesuk

Original release
- Network: GMM 25
- Release: 6 September – 29 November 2020

Related
- The Gifted

The Gifted: Graduation is a 2020 Thai television series which serves as a sequel to The Gifted (2018). The series stars an ensemble cast featuring Korapat Kirdpan (Nanon), Wachirawit Ruangwiwat (Chimon), Harit Cheewagaroon (Sing), Methika Jiranorraphat (Jane), Atthaphan Phunsawat (Gun), Pattadon Janngeon (Fiat), and Napasorn Weerayuttvilai (Puimek) reprising their roles, joined by Nattawat Finkler (Patrick), Chanikarn Tangkabodee (Prim), and Phuwin Tangsakyuen. It chronicles the events two years after The Gifted, wherein the Gifted Class, students with superpowers, join hands in bringing down the powerful school director and his oppressive system.

Directed by The Gifted co-director Waasuthep Ketpetch and collaboratively produced by GMMTV and Parbdee Taweesuk, The Gifted: Graduation was one of the twelve television series for 2020 showcased by GMMTV during their "New & Next" event on 15 October 2019. It premiered on GMM 25 and LINE TV on 6 September 2020, airing on Sundays at 20:30 ICT and 22:30 ICT, respectively. The series concluded on 29 November 2020.

== Synopsis ==
Set two years after the events of The Gifted (2018), The Gifted: Graduation chronicles the struggles of Ritdha High School's Gifted Class, students with superpowers, as they join hands in bringing down the powerful school director (Wanchana Sawasdee) and his oppressive system, a mission started by the class' leading students—the mind-controller Pang (Korapat Kirdpan) and technopath Wave (Wachirawit Ruangwiwat). This sequel also showed how the fight is beyond what happens in Ritdha High School, expanding into a full blown power struggle between Director Supot and the Ministry of Education.

== Cast and characters ==
=== Main ===
==== Gifted Class 15 ====
- Korapat Kirdpan (Nanon) as Pawaret Sermrittirong (Pang)

a student of Ritdha High School and member of the Gifted Program Class 15; (Note: This refers to the batch of Gifted students admitted to the program in school year 2018, as portrayed in The Gifted (2018).) the very first Gifted student from Class VIII, the school's most inferior class. Pang has the power of mind control, in which he can compel someone to do whatever he wishes through physical contact with the subject and feeling their heartbeat. However, Pang's powers evolved such that he can command multiple people to do his bidding without physical contact.

- Wachirawit Ruangwiwat (Chimon) as Wasuthorn Worachotmethee (Wave)

a student of Class I from Ritdha High School and member of the Gifted Program Class 15. Wave has the power of technopathy, the ability to control and manipulate electronic machines through contact. Wave's powers have improved such that he can also work on electronic machines that are damaged beyond repair.

- Pattadon Janngeon (Fiat) as Thanakorn Gorbgoon (Korn)

a student of Class I from Ritdha High School and member of the Gifted Program Class 15; leader of the Anti-Gifted (although it is revealed that he was being controlled by Director Supot). Korn has the ability to remain awake for days without getting sleepy or fatigued. After becoming disgruntled due to his misfortunes and deteriorating trust with his potential and his classmates in Class 15, (Note: As portrayed in The Gifted (2018)) his mental health spirals down and he becomes the leader of the Anti-Gifted, a covert group of Ritdha students who resort to violence in fighting against the Director and the Gifted Program. His potential develops to include regeneration, which gives his body the capacity to heal itself within 24 hours.

- Methika Jiranorraphat (Jane) as Irin Jaratpun (Claire)

a student of Class I from Ritdha High School and member of the Gifted Program Class 15. Claire is a synesthete who can see a person's aura and associate the color of the aura with a certain kind of emotion. Her potential develops to being able to interpret the cause or details of someone's current emotion.

- Atthaphan Phunsawat (Gun) as Punn Taweesilp

a student of Class I from Ritdha High School and member of the Gifted Program Class 15. Punn has the power of imitation and ability mastering, which enables him to perfectly copy a skill by watching or studying but causes him to develop multiple personalities. His potential develops to being able to mimic and master the potentials of his fellow Gifted.

- Napasorn Weerayuttvilai (Puimek) as Patchamon Pitiwongkorn (Mon)

a student of Class II from Ritdha High School and member of the Gifted Program Class 15. Mon possesses superhuman strength with enhanced agility, dexterity and coordination; however, her body produces pheromones that are excreted through her bodily fluids (e.g. sweat and tears) and can cause a person to turn insane or violent.

- Harit Cheewagaroon (Sing) as Wichai Sai-Ngern (Ohm)

a student of Class II from Ritdha High School and member of the Gifted Program Class 15. Ohm can make himself invisible, and can make objects (including humans) disappear and bring them back again by will.

- Chayapol Jutamas (AJ) as Chanuj Saeliu (Jack), and Chayakorn Jutamas (JJ) as Chanet Saeliu (Jo)

the identical twin students of Class III from Ritdha High School and members of the Gifted Program Class 15. Jack and Jo have the ability to respond to stimuli in sync.

==== Gifted Class 16 ====
- Patrick Nattawat Finkler as Tharm Thamrongsawat (Time)

a 10th grade student - Class I from Ritdha High School and member of the Gifted Program Class 16. Time initiates a campaign for the reinstatement of the Gifted Program after learning about its termination due to the chaos allegedly caused by the Gifted Class 15. He becomes an "informal" Gifted student after sneaking into the Gifted Class 15's hideout and being able to hear the Gifted trigger soundwave which Wave played during the Class' meeting. With Class 15' help, he discovers his potential of locality tracking, the ability to ascertain the exact location of a person or object he is familiar with. Time must also be familiar with the place, so he uses a map to locate someone or something in a place he is not too familiar with.

- Chanikarn Tangkabodee (Prim) as Natnicha Wongwattana (Grace)
  - Intira Charoenpura as adult Grace (Note: As guest role, appearing in Eps. 10-12)

a 10th grade student - Class I from Ritdha High School and member of the Gifted Program Class 16. Grace is a late bloomer who discovers or activates her potential later compared to her peers in Class 16. She has the power of alternate-selves contacting, which enables her to contact and be connected to the future (adult) version of herself. When her future self takes over her body, she manifests a behavior similar to having multiple personalities, such as having a different attitude, being capable of doing things she cannot do in her normal state and memory gaps. This potential also makes her capable of knowing the future through her future self, which then helps her evade future events or guide her course of action while in the present.

- Phuwin Tangsakyuen as Thammarong Decharat (Third)

a 11th grade student - Class I from Ritdha High School and member of the Gifted Program Class 16. Third was appointed as a student inspector by the new Head of Administration. He possesses the potential of mind-reading, which enables him to read the mind of person and get the desired information when he asks a proper question to the subject. He becomes one of the most important characters in the series.

==== The adults ====
- Wanchana Sawasdee (Bird) as Director Supot Chueamanee
  - Tawan Vihokratana (Tay) as young Supot Chueamanee (Note: As guest role, appearing in Eps. 1, 8 and 10)

the Director of Ritdha High School and master of the Gifted Program. Mr. Supot has the same, but stronger and evolved, mind control power as Pang. Since he and Pang have the same power, they cannot use their powers against each other. He strongly believes in a society where the strong leads the weaker or inferior ones, as reflected in the school's student hierarchy system, his abusive treatment of low-class students and his bias towards the Gifted. Thirty years ago, he brainwashes his friend into believing he is Supot and he has a mind control superpower in order to use him to gain power over the Ministry of Education and establish the Gifted Program. He works with the fake Supot in discovering the evolutionary roots of the Gifted and in developing the potential activation sound wave. Their failed human experiment on fake Supot's girlfriend Nate due an unforeseen virus in her brain unintentionally leads to the Ministry developing the Nyx-88 bioweapon.

- Chatchawit Techarukpong (Victor) as Teacher Porama "Pom" Wongrattana

the class adviser of Ritdha High School's Gifted Program and a Gifted Batch 3 alumnus. Mr. Pom has the power of memory manipulation, in which he can erase someone's memory by touching his or her head, before which he has to put the subject first under hypnosis using sound with a regular tempo (through a metronome).

- Manatsanun Panlertwongskul (Donut) as Ms. Darin Wattanasin

the Deputy Director of Academic Affairs of Ritdha High School. Darin is appointed to the position by the Minister of Education Mr. Pichet himself to do a secret mission, which involves subduing Mr. Supot using the Nyx-88 bioweapon.

- Jirakit Thawornwong (Mek) as Chanon "Non" Taweepong

Mr. Pom's batchmate in the Gifted Program Batch 3 and the first Gifted student to be eliminated from the program. Non has the power of high-accuracy calculation. He fought against the Director and attempted to expose his crimes against non-Gifted students but loses when the Director compels Mr. Pom to erase his memories, recovering them 10 years later. Though he decides not to revive his fight against the Director for fear of losing his memories again, he gets an IT support job in the Ministry of Education while secretly investigating the Gifted Program. At the end of the series, Non and Mr. Pom work together with the Gifted students to bring down Director Supot.

- Poramet Noi-am as Mr. Pichet

the newly appointed Minister of Education who designates Ms. Darin as Ritdha High School's Deputy Director of Academic Affairs for a secret mission. Thirty years ago, he was the head of the Ministry's top-secret Division of Special Personnel Development which tracks Thais with superpowers in order to use them for the country's development and, at the same time, ensuring that they will not be a threat to national security. After learning of Supot and Yuth's failed experiment on Nate, he discovers that Nate's brain is infected with a mutated virus that only affects Gifted people. He instructed the Division to synthesize the virus, leading to the creation of the Nyx-88, a bioweapon the Ministry can use against the Gifted.

=== Supporting ===
==== Gifted Class 16 ====
- Passatorn Koolkang (Captain) as O

a 10th Grade – Class I student from Ritdha High School and member of the Gifted Program Class 16; one of Time's friends. O has the potential of enhanced memory which enables him to remember large amounts of data in graphic and textual formats.

- Kittiphop Sereevichayasawat (Satang) as Bom

a 10th Grade – Class I student from Ritdha High School and member of the Gifted Program Class 16; one of Time's friends. Bom has the power of psychokinesis which enables him to move objects using his mind.

- Pichaya Pocharoen (Earth)
- Narabodin Deeboonmee (Winner)
- Dylan Alexander Bryant
- Palita Kitiyodom
- Rawipha Thananphongthon
- Kittiphat Si-bunrueang
- Waraphon Saisin

==== Ritdha High School employees ====
- Ronnakon Sanitpraphatson as Mr. Wisit

the new Head of Administration of Ritdha High School. In stark contrast to his predecessor Ms. Ladda, Mr. Wisit is less strict and, instead of dealing student delinquents himself, he creates a group of four student inspectors (which includes Third).

- Dhammarong Sermrittirong (SandOtnim) (Note: Sermrittirong is the author of the 2015 short film The Gifted and the novel The Gifted, which served as basis for GMMTV's The Gifted franchise. He also co-directed The Gifted: Graduation’s prequel The Gifted (2018).) as Grade 12 – Class VIII's math teacher
- Patha Thongpan (O) as Grade 10 – Class I's teacher-proctor during the Placement Exam
- Chittaya Chanphuang as Grade 10 – Class I teacher

==== Student inspectors ====
- Napolpong Sooksombut
- Tatpong Sermpornwiwat
- Thivara Prasansapakit

==== Anti-Gifted ====
- Siraphat Arun as Jay

a Class V 12th grade student of Ritdha High School; member of the Anti-Gifted. Under Korn's command, Jay steals a vial of Nyx-88 from Ms. Darin.

- Chatchanat Paphawiwattananont
- Sarayut Phruetthawongsiri
- Akkhadet Chuwong

==== Grade 10 students ====
- Nonthakorn Chatchue (Rossi)
- Norrapat Phonkhit
- Nicole Great Ngeesanthia
- Thanakon Milap

==== Ministry of Education officials ====
- Kanokphon Ruamtham
- Thongchai Ma-men
- Aekapong Buapung
- Phatraphi Ninlakhun
- Thiti Arakphotchong

=== Guest role ===
- Poramaporn Jangkamol (June) as Nayanate "Nate" Jiraarpa, a.k.a. Kanokpan Rattanadecha (Ep. 11)
  - Tipnaree Weerawatnodom (Namtan) (Eps. 1, 8, 10 and 11) as young Nate

the girlfriend of the fake Supot Chueamanee; a doctor by profession. Thirty years ago, Nate volunteered as the first human subject in Yuth/real Supot and fake Supot's experimentation of the potential activation sound wave despite having a fever and sustained an severe brain damage consequently. It is revealed that her illness is caused by an unforeseen enterovirus which infected her brain and has mutated (due to the potential activation sound wave) to cause severe illness to activated Gifted people. The virus in her brain was synthesized by Division of Special Personnel Development into the Nyx-88 bioweapon. She was then sneaked out of the Ministry by Supot who faked her death and treated her from the infection using an anti-Nyx-88 machine he invented. She was also compelled by Supot to live under her new name Kanokpan Rattanadecha and to work as a provincial school teacher to keep her away from Ministry.

- Thanat Lowkhunsombat (Lee) (Eps. 1, 8 and 10) as fake Supot Chueamanee

Mr. Supot's friend and research partner 30 years ago; Nate's boyfriend. He was brainwashed by Supot into believing he is "Supot" and he has the potential of mind control. Unbeknownst to him, he is being used by Supot in establishing the Gifted Program and achieving the latter's greed for power with less interference from the Ministry. He is later brainwashed by Supot into killing himself after Supot reveals to him all of his schemes and intentions.

- Apichaya Thongkham (Lilly) as Chayanit "Namtaan" Prachkarit (Eps. 11 and 13)

a former student of Ritdha High School in the Gifted Program Class 15. Namtaan has the power of psychometry, the ability to see or hear associated events on an object or person through contact. A year before the events of The Gifted: Graduation, she was nearly killed in a bombing incident in Ritdha that was intended by the Anti-Gifted for Mr. Supot (the incident is then blamed against the Gifted Class 15 and pushed the Ministry to terminate the Gifted Program). Her mother brought her out of Thailand, consequently, for her treatment and recovery. While abroad, she keeps in touch with Ohm whom she is close with since 2018. It is later revealed that Director Supot brainwashed Namtaan's mother to take her away as he has a shady past which he cannot risk being exposed by Namtaan's powers.

== Episodes ==
No.	Title	Original release date
1	"Episode 1" (Note: Every week since the first week of The Gifted: Graduation, the series' director Waasuthep Ketpetch and production company Parbdee Taweesuk reveal the title of an episode through their official social media accounts, albeit these are unofficial titles due to the fact that they are not used in the title sequence of the final/official broadcast.) (Note: unofficial title: Student Move)	6 September 2020
A 10th grade student from Class I named Time aspires to become a Gifted student, only to learn from his senior Third that the Minister of Education has ordered the termination of the Gifted Program due to last year's chaos in school believed to be instigated by the Gifted Batch 15. Indignant, Time gathers support from his schoolmates to demand the reinstatement of the Program.
2	"Episode 2" (Note: unofficial title: F*ck Gifted)	13 September 2020
When Time accidentally discovers that he is Gifted, the Gifted Class 15, headed by Pang, volunteers to help him unlock his potential. Time learns from Third about the drastic incident which forced the Ministry to cancel the Gifted Program. As Time doubts the legitimacy of Class 15's anti-Gifted movement, his potential activates and he rushes to stop what he thinks to be Class 15's dangerous plot.
3	"Episode 3" (Note: unofficial title: Revolution Needs Wifi)	20 September 2020
With the help of the Gifted Class 15, Time recognizes and develops his potential of locality tracking. On the day of the Placement Exam, the Director contrives a way to stop the Gifted Class 15 from sabotaging the exam. When Class 15's plan of action seem to come to a standstill, Pang knew that the answer lies with Time.
4	"Episode 4" (Note: unofficial title: Brains Hunter)	27 September 2020
Ms. Darin employs Third's mind reading potential to search for her secret vial which was stolen by an Anti-Gifted. After discovering that someone from the Gifted Class 15 could be behind the theft, Third forces an unknowing Time to tell the truth and apparently overuses his power over Time, who suddenly suffers an unbearable headache. But the Director orders a medical check-up not only for Time but for all Gifted students. Soon after learning about the accusation, the Gifted Class 15 uncovers the horrible truth about Ms. Darin's lost vial.
5	"Episode 5" (Note: unofficial title: Purple Light Means Fear)	4 October 2020
The Gifted Class 16 fall ill due to the Nyx-88 virus which is genetically modified to affect only Gifted students. Only one of them, Grace, is luckily uninfected. As the Director, Mr. Pom and Ms. Darin work together to stop the disease, the Gifted Class 15 are in a rush to find out who among them is the traitor who unleashed the potentially fatal bioweapon.
6	"Episode 6" (Note: unofficial title: Fallen Boy)	11 October 2020
As the renegade Korn flees the school, the Gifted Class 15 find themselves divided on the dilemma of his betrayal. Pang is convinced by Claire and Mon to search for Korn and try to understand and reason with him before Punn, Wave, and the authorities could intervene. Time risks his failing health in using his potential to help Pang locate Korn. In the search for his classmate-turned-traitor, Pang runs into a man he thought had died.
7	"Episode 7" (Note: unofficial title: Best Friend's Birthday)	18 October 2020
After Time's death and Korn's suicide attempt, the bond among the Gifted Class 15 continues to deteriorate. The Education Ministry turns against the Director and Mr. Pom who both go quickly into hiding. Pang discovers the worsening situation among the bedridden Gifted Class 16, but Class 15 is already too divided to fight against the Ministry's inaction. When all hope seems lost, a revelation awaits Pang in an abandoned steel mill.
8	"Episode 8" (Note: unofficial title: The Red Oil Drum)	25 October 2020
Pang discovers that Time is still alive and is virtually restored to health. The Director and Mr. Pom had smuggled Time out of the school and secretly treated him for the Nyx-88 infection. In the steel mill, the Director recounts to Pang the harsh beginnings of the Gifted Program — a story involving his fellow researcher, his girlfriend and Mr. Pichet.
9	"Episode 9" (Note: unofficial title: Frenemy)	1 November 2020
The secrets of the Gifted Program has been leaked into the Internet, but the Ministry suspiciously intends to hold a press con to publicize the Program's existence. Pang, Wave and their juniors Time, Grace and Third join hands to stop the Ministry, but their efforts lead to something else.
10	"Episode 10" (Note: unofficial title: Winner Takes All)	8 November 2020
Despite the effort of Pang and his allies, the press con continues but, instead of the Ministry, the Director is the one addressing the audience, publicizing the Gifted Program and declaring its nationwide expansion. As he turns against the horrified Pang, the Director reveals to him his true agenda and recounts the other side of the story of his past.
11	"Episode 11" (Note: unofficial title: The Blueprint)	15 November 2020
A mysterious woman appears to Grace in a vision and compels her to enlist Time and Third in the search for the person who might hold the only key in stopping the Nyx-88 infection. Third suspects Grace's potential has awoken when, in her normal state, she insists she has no recollection of her commissioning the task to the boys. Meanwhile, the Gifted Class 15 risk getting the virus if they do not reveal Pang's whereabouts to the Director.
12	"Episode 12" (Note: unofficial title: Graduated)	22 November 2020
With the blueprint of the antiviral radiation machine now in the hands of the Gifted, the Director perceives Grace as a threat to his plans. He hastens the full activation of Grace's potential and consequently he uncovers a potential so exceptional it could even be superior to his own. As Korn volunteers to be the first to be treated of Nyx-88 using the machine, Ohm, Wave, Mr. Pom and Chanon work together to stop the Director's corrupt plans.
13	"Episode 13" (Note: unofficial title: This Time is Ours)	29 November 2020
The truth of the Gifted Program has been exposed and the consequent public sentiment has started to put the Director in an unfavorable position. As the Director refuses to concede, the Gifted Class 15, Grace, Mr. Pom and Chanon make their final offensive. Soon, they have to decide on how to properly end the fight they have started two years ago.
