= My Dear Loser =

2017–18 Thai television series

- Official series poster for My Dear Loser: Edge of 17
- Thai: My Dear Loser – รักไม่เอาถ่าน
- Genre: Romantic comedy; Drama
- Created by: GMMTV
- Directed by: Chatkaew Susiwa
- Country of origin: Thailand
- Original language: Thai
- No. of episodes: 31: 9 (Edge of 17); 10 (Monster Romance); 12 (Happy Ever After)

Production
- Running time: 50 minutes
- Production company: GMMTV

Original release
- Network: GMM 25; LINE TV
- Release: 9 July 2017 – 11 March 2018

Related
- Our Skyy (Ep. 2)

My Dear Loser (Thai: My Dear Loser – รักไม่เอาถ่าน; My Dear Loser – Rak Mai Ao Than) is a 2017–2018 Thai television series each presented through one of the three segments entitled Edge of 17, Monster Romance and Happy Ever After.

Directed by Chatkaew Susiwa and produced by GMMTV, the three-part series was one of the six television series for 2017 showcased by GMMTV in their "6 Natures+" event on 2 March 2017. The premiere segment Edge of 17 was broadcast on 9 July 2017 to 3 September 2017, followed by Monster Romance (10 September 2017 to 17 December 2017) and Happy Ever After (24 December 2017 to 11 March 2018), airing on Sundays on GMM 25 and LINE TV at 20:30 ICT and 22:30 ICT, respectively.

The segment Monster Romance was among the entertainment programs that were temporarily stopped for the month of October in preparation for the royal cremation ceremonies of Thai King Bhumibol Adulyadej. It resumed broadcasting on 5 November 2017 and concluded on 11 March 2018.

== Cast and characters ==
Below are the cast of the series:

=== My Dear Loser: Edge of 17 ===
==== Main ====
- Korapat Kirdpan (Nanon) as Oh
- Methika Jiranorraphat (Jane) as Peach
- Wachirawit Ruangwiwat (Chimon) as Sun
- Purim Rattanaruangwattana (Pluem) as In
- Pronpiphat Pattanasettanon (Plustor) as Copper
- Napasorn Weerayuttvilai (Puimek) as Ainam

=== Supporting ===
- Thanat Lowkhunsombat (Lee) as Pong (Ep. 4–6 & 9)
- Nachat Juntapun (Nicky) as Jack (Ep. 4–6 & 9)
- Harit Cheewagaroon (Sing) as Jued (Ep. 4–6 & 9)
- Achirawich Saliwattana (Gun) as Ken
- Rutricha Phapakithi (Ciize) as Moji
- Tipnaree Weerawatnodom (Namtan) as On
- Paweenut Pangnakorn as Jitra
- Benja Singkharawat (Yangyi) as Peach's mother
- Chinnarat Siripongchawalit (Mike) as Toey
- Sirinuch Petchurai (Koi) as Oh's mother

=== My Dear Loser: Monster Romance ===
Official series poster as My Dear Loser: Monster Romance

==== Main ====
- Thanat Lowkhunsombat (Lee) as Pong
- Worranit Thawornwong (Mook) as Namking

==== Supporting ====
- Harit Cheewagaroon (Sing) as Jued
- Tipnaree Weerawatnodom (Namtan) as On
- Nachat Juntapun (Nicky) as Jack
- Neen Suwanamas as Emma
- Phakjira Kanrattanasoot (Nanan) as Kris
- Chanagun Arpornsutinan (Gunsmile) as Tae
- Vonthongchai Intarawat as Pok (Pong's brother)
- Orn-anong Panyawong as Pong's mother
- Puttichai Kasetsin (Push) as Ton

=== My Dear Loser: Happy Ever After ===
Official series poster as My Dear Loser: Happy Ever After

==== Main ====
- Esther Supreeleela as Korya
- Puttichai Kasetsin (Push) as Ton

==== Supporting ====
- Niti Chaichitathorn (Pompam) as Por
- Sivakorn Lertchuchot (Guy) as Otto
- Alysaya Tsoi (Alice) as Namo
- Paweenut Pangnakorn as Jitra
- Gornpop Janjaroen as Jeng
- Pongkool Suebsung as Win

==== Guest ====
- Purim Rattanaruangwattana (Pluem) as In (Ep. 8 & 12)
- Wachirawit Ruangwiwat (Chimon) as Sun (Ep. 8 & 12)
- Korapat Kirdpan (Nanon) as Oh (Ep. 8 & 12)
- Thanaboon Wanlopsirinun (Na) (Ep. 11)
- Worranit Thawornwong (Mook) as Namking (Ep. 12)
- Thanat Lowkhunsombat (Lee) as Pong (Ep. 12)
- Nachat Juntapun (Nicky) as Jack (Ep. 12)
- Harit Cheewagaroon (Sing) as Jued (Ep. 12)
- Tipnaree Weerawatnodom (Namtan) as On (Ep. 12)
- Methika Jiranorraphat (Jane) as Peach (Ep. 12)
- Napasorn Weerayuttvilai (Puimek) as Ainam (Ep. 12)
