= My Precious (film) =

2023 Thai romance film

- Theatrical release poster
- Directed by: Naphat Chitveerapat; Kanittha Kwunyoo
- Based on: The Girl We Chased Together in Those Years by Giddens Ko
- Produced by: Sataporn Panichraksapong; Darapa Choeysanguan
- Starring: Korapat Kirdpan; Rachanun Mahawan; Wachirawit Ruangwiwat; Trai Nimtawat; Pawat Chittsawangdee; Thanaset Suriyapornchaikul; Benyapa Jeenprasom
- Music by: "รักแรก (First Love)" by Nont Tanont
- Production companies: GMMTV; Nar-ra-tor
- Distributed by: GDH 559; GMM Grammy
- Release date: 27 April 2023 (Thailand)
- Running time: 120 minutes
- Country: Thailand
- Language: Thai
- Box office: ฿11 Million (21 May 2023)

My Precious The Series
- Series poster
- รักแรก โคตรลืมยาก The Series
- Created by: GMMTV
- Written by: Lalil Kittitanaphan; Naphat Chitveerapat
- Directed by: Kanittha Kwunyoo
- Starring: Korapat Kirdpan; Rachanun Mahawan; Wachirawit Ruangwiwat; Trai Nimtawat; Pawat Chittsawangdee; Thanaset Suriyapornchaikul; Benyapa Jeenprasom
- Ending theme: "รักแรก (First Love)" (Lin Ver.) by Film Rachanun
- Country of origin: Thailand
- Original language: Thai
- No. of episodes: 10

Production
- Running time: 45 minutes
- Production companies: GMMTV; Nar-ra-tor

Original release
- Network: GMM 25; Viu
- Release: 21 March – 23 May 2024

Related
- You Are the Apple of My Eye

My Precious (Thai: รักแรก โคตรลืมยาก; RTGS: Rak Raek Khot Luem Yak, lit. 'The First Love is so Hard to Forget') is a 2023 Thai coming of age romance film based on the semi-autobiographical novel The Girl We Chased Together in Those Years by Taiwanese author Giddens Ko.

The film was directed by Naphat Chitveerapat alongside Kanittha Kwunyoo and produced by GMMTV together with Nar-ra-tor. The story is about a group of seven best friends who had unfulfilled first love and all they can do is remember it as a positive experience in their life.

The film was originally filmed and scheduled for release in 2020, but due to the COVID-19 pandemic in Thailand, it was indefinitely postponed before its actual release date on 27 April 2023 in Thailand.

During the "GMMTV 2024: UP&ABOVE Part 1" event on 17 October 2023, it was announced that an extended version of the film would be released as My Precious The Series in 2024.

== Cast and characters ==
=== Main ===
- Korapat Kirdpan (Nanon) as Tong
- Rachanun Mahawan (Film) as Lin
- Wachirawit Ruangwiwat (Chimon) as Bank
- Trai Nimtawat (Neo) as Mai
- Pawat Chittsawangdee (Ohm) as Dong
- Thanaset Suriyapornchaikul (Euro) as Pao
- Benyapa Jeenprasom (View) as Ja-Oh

=== Supporting ===
- Ornanong Panyawong (Orn) as Lin's mother
- Surasak Chaiat (Nu) as Lin's father
- Pimonwan Hoonthongkam (Pui) as Tong's mother
- Jaturong Mokjok as Tong's father
- Nattharinphon Phrommin (In) as Mai's mother
- Sattabut Laedeke (Drake) as Nicky (Tong's university friend)
- Chayakorn Jutamas (JJ) as Pod (Tong's university friend)
- Pusit Dittapisit (Fluke) as Lin's groom

== Production ==
In 2019, GMMTV decided to make their first feature film, so they contacted Taiwan to obtain the copyright for the film You Are the Apple of My Eye in order to remake it in Thai. Nar-ra-tor, a production studio that has created numerous series including Happy Birthday, A Gift For Whom You Hate, and Who Are You, was chosen by GMMTV to produce this film. Since the movie is set in 1999, the production team decided to shoot more than 80% of it in Sukhothai Province.

== Publication and release ==
The film was first announced on 16 October 2019 during the "GMMTV 2020 NEW & NEXT" press conference, stating that it was GMMTV's first feature film project and would be released in 2020 with GDH 559 as the theatrical distributor. However, due to the COVID-19 pandemic, the film's plans were indefinitely postponed before being reannounced in 2021 at the "GMMTV 2022: BORDERLESS" press conference, which stated that actual filming would start in 2022. However, the film was ultimately set to be distributed in theaters across the country in 2023.

Later, a live press conference was held at GMM Grammy Place building, followed by the "My Precious First Premiere" on 25 April 2023 at Siam Pavalai Royal Grand Theater, Siam Paragon. On 27 April 2023, the film had its first screening at SF World Cinema, CentralWorld. The movie cast also did "My Precious On Tour" at SF Cinema in several shopping malls from 27 April to 7 May 2023.

In the end, there was "My Precious Finale", a farewell event for the film's final screening with the actors and director, followed by a Q&A session on 13 June 2023 at SF World Cinema, CentralWorld.

== Reception ==
On its first official day of release (27 April 2023), the film earned 0.52 million baht. After its first weekend of release, the film made a total of 2.51 million baht. After 25 days of release, the film grossed 11 million baht. Due to the popularity of the movie's soundtrack and the enthusiasm of the audience, which spread through word-of-mouth, the movie was able to remain in theatres for 48 days.

== Soundtrack ==
Title	Artist
"รักแรก (First Love)"	Nont Tanont
"รักแรก (First Love)" (Lin Ver.)	Film Rachanun
"ยังยินดีครับเพื่อน"	U.H.T.
"สายลมที่หวังดี"	U.H.T.
"ไม่ลืม"	U.H.T.
"เพื่อนเก่า"	U.H.T.
"UHT...นี่แหละเพื่อน"	U.H.T.
"อยากเห็นหน้าคุณ"	Loso
"ที่ 1 ของใจ"	BUDOKAN
"อยากเห็นหน้าคุณ"	Bird Thongchai
"ลืมไปว่ารักกัน"	Nuvo
