= Intira Charoenpura =

Thai actress (born 1980)

- อินทิรา เจริญปุระ
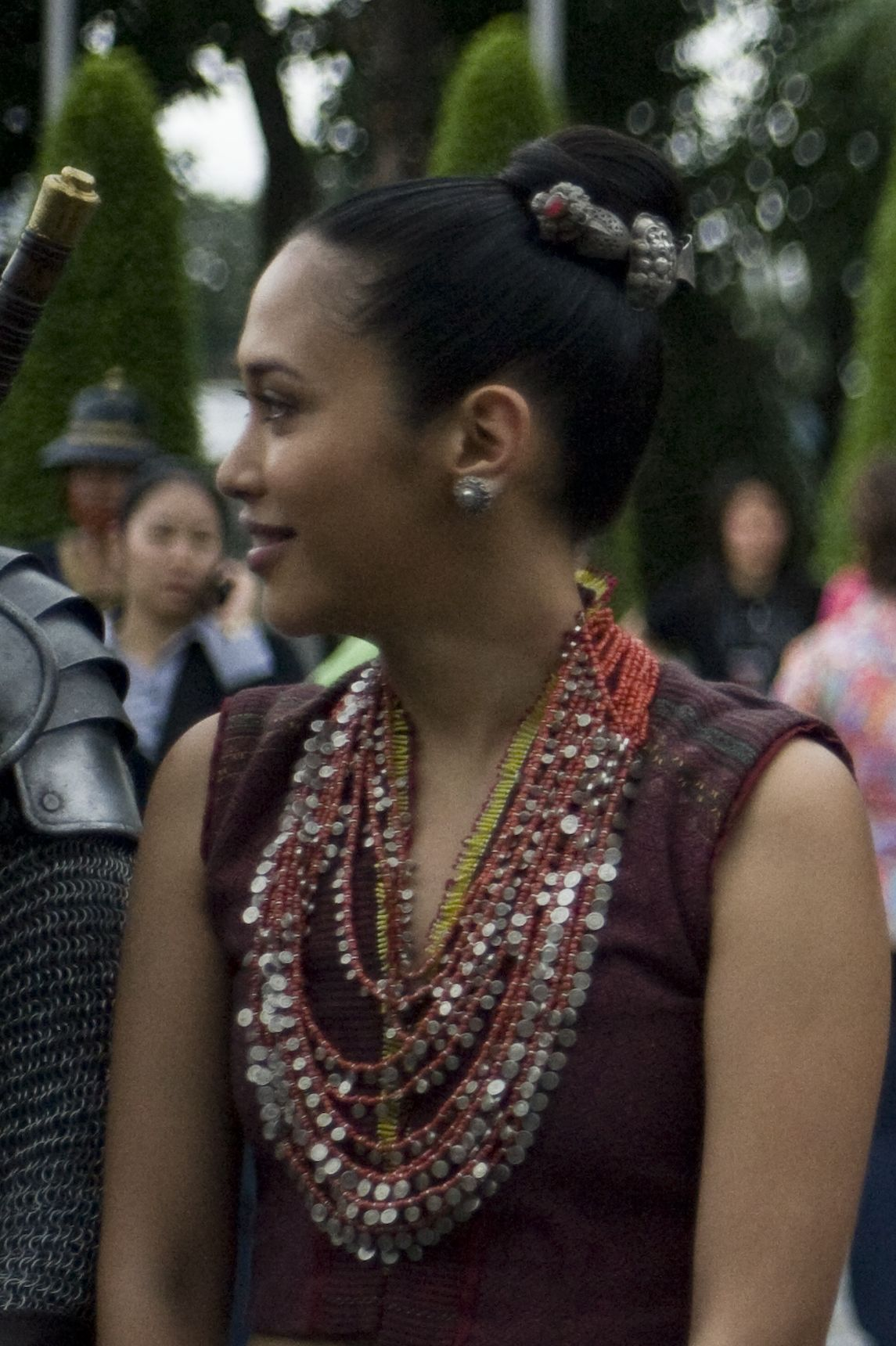
- Intira in 2009
- Born: 23 December 1980 (age 45); Bangkok, Thailand
- Other names: Sai; Sine; ทราย
- Years active: 1994–present
- Known for: Actress, Singer, Activism
- Notable work: Nang Nak
- Relatives: Mai Charoenpura (half sister)

Intira Charoenpura (Thai: อินทิรา เจริญปุระ; RTGS: Inthira Charoenpura), also known by the nickname Sai or Sine (Thai: ทราย; born 23 December 1980) is a Thai actress, author and singer. She is known for her role as Mae Nak in the 1999 Thai horror film, Nang Nak. In 2007, she was featured in a prominent role as the warrior Princess Loehkin in part two of King Naresuan.

== Early life and education ==
Intira comes from a well-known show business family. Her father is actor-director Ruj Ronnapop (Thai: รุจน์ รณภพ; a stage name). Her elder half sister, Siriwimol "Mai" Charoenpura (Thai: ใหม่ เจริญปุระ) is a popular singer, author, and actress with GMM Grammy.

Intira attended Khemasiri Memorial School (โรงเรียนเขมะสิริอนุสสรณ์), a girl school at the junior high school level. She received a bachelor of arts in communication arts, majoring in advertising from Bangkok University.

== Career ==
At the age of 13, Intira starred in her first Thai TV drama (lakorn) Lah (Thai: ล่า, hunt) produced by X'ACT in 1994, the drama wing of GMM Grammy. In the lakorn, she portrayed a girl who, together with her mother (played by Sinjai Plengpanich), were gang raped. She became mentally ill while her mother proceeded to hunt down, torture and kill each and every member of the gang. Intira became a celebrity, known for taking this difficult role in her first acting work.

She is known for her role as Mae Nak in 1999's Nang Nak. In 2007, she was featured in a prominent role as the warrior Princess Loehkin in part two of King Naresuan.

=== Music ===
At age 13, Intira signed an album contract with GMM Grammy. She released her first album in March 1995, Nalika Sine (Thai: นาฬิกาทราย). It is a teenage pop album. Khun Khru Kradat Sine (Thai: คุณครูกระดาษทราย) is the most famous song of the album. The song talks about being grateful to her teacher and is still often used to honor teachers on Teachers' Day, for example.

She left GMM Grammy after her contract expired and altered her music style to rock. She released an indie album, Sine, in 1998. The album was produced by Jirasak "Catarock" Parnpoom. He became her boyfriend but they later broke up. With the success of her new rocker image, she rejoined GMM Grammy and released her third album D^Sine in September 1999. This album contains the track Sai Lom Thi Wang Dee (Thai: สายลมที่หวังดี). It is probably Intira's most famous song.

== Other ventures ==
=== Activism ===
In the late 2010s, Intira became known for her Twitter presence, where she is outspoken about her depression and human rights. She is a supporter of the 2020 Thai protests, and has contributed to the movement's funding. She was accused of defaming the monarchy, a strict law that could land her in prison for 15 years, which was unclear accusation against her.

== Filmography ==
=== Film ===
- Men's Diary as Kwan (1999)
- Nang Nak as Nak (1999)
- Brokedown Palace (1999)
- A Fighter's Blues as Pim Nathasiri; Hong Kong Cantonese title, A Fu (2000)
- The Unborn, also known as The Mother, as Por (2003)
- Six as Fai (2004)
- The Legend of King Naresuan, Pts. I-V as Princess Loekhin(Pts. 1 [Hostage of Hongsawadi] and 2 [Reclaiming Sovereignty], released in 2007; Pts. III [Naval Battle] and IV [The Nanda Bayin War] released in 2011; Pts. IV and V related in 2014)
- Sumolah as Siti (2007)
- House (2007)
- In the Shadow of Naga as Naam Pheung (Honey) (2008)
- The Sanctuary as Praifa (2009)
- H2-Oh! as Mook (2010)
- I Miss U as Tree (2012)
- Choice as Yoong (2013)
- By the Time It Gets Dark as Ann (2016)
- 4 Kings II as Bung (2023)
- Taklee Genesis as Mordin's Mother (2024)
- King Kaew as King Kaew (2026)

=== Television ===
- Lah as Mathukorn/"Pueng" (1994)
- Baan Soi Dao as Ingfah (1996)
- Kong Pun Ta Harn Khen (1997)
- Aroon Sawad as Oranee (1999)
- Mae Kah as Niracha/"Tan" (2001)
- Mae Liang Khon Mai as Saikwan/"Kwan" (2001)
- Sao Noi as Nid/Wanida (2002)
- Naree Loi Fai as Naree (2003)
- Aya Ruk as Choi (2013)
- Dead Time Stories as Cham (2015)
- Love Songs Love Stories: Rao Mee Rao as Nika (2016)
- Mae Nak as Puang (2016)
- Pring Khon Rerng Muang as Pratiap (2017)
- Payakka as Seeprai (2018)
- Rabum Marn as Sahpa (2018)
- Sai Lohit as Yuean (2018)
- He's Coming to Me as Kwan (2019)
- Sleepless Society: Nyctophobia as Sita (2019)
- Mon Garn Bandan Ruk as Manaswee/Bam (2019)
- 3 Will Be Free as Vanika (2019)
- The Gifted: Graduation as Grace (adult) (2020)

== Discography ==
- Nalika Sine (1995)
- Sine
- D^Sine (1999)
