= One Night Steal =

2019–20 Thai television series

- Thai: One Night Steal – แผนรักสลับดวง
- Genre: Romantic comedy; Supernatural
- Created by: GMMTV
- Based on: Just My Luck by I. Marlene King and Amy B. Harris
- Directed by: Kritsada Kanwichaphon
- Starring: Perawat Sangpotirat; Sutatta Udomsilp
- Opening theme: "ไม่กลัว" (Mai Glua) by Krist Perawat, Pluem Purim and Sing Harit
- Ending theme: "ไม่กลัว" (Mai Glua) by Krist Perawat, Pluem Purim and Sing Harit
- Composers: Ardsanai Ardsakul; Perawat Sangpotirat
- Country of origin: Thailand
- Original language: Thai
- No. of episodes: 11

Production
- Editor: Parbdee Tawesuk
- Running time: 60 minutes
- Production companies: GMMTV; Parbdee Tawesuk

Original release
- Network: GMM 25; LINE TV
- Release: November 24, 2019 – February 9, 2020

One Night Steal (Thai: One Night Steal – แผนรักสลับดวง; One Night Steal – Phaen Rak Sa-lap Duang) is a 2019 Thai television series broadcast by GMMTV. The series is based on a 2006 American film Just My Luck. Directed by Kritsada Kanwichaphon, it stars Perawat Sangpotirat (Krist) and Sutatta Udomsilp (Punpun). It aired from November 24, 2019 to February 9, 2020.

== Synopsis ==
Jee (Sutatta Udomsilp) is a girl who has been showered with luck since her birth that even when a bread with jam falls, it doesn't fall on the side where the jam is. However, she is not that lucky when it comes to love. While working in a stock market prediction company, she meets Putti (Thanaboon Wanlopsirinun), a young business customer who is trying his best to get close to her.

Nott (Perawat Sangpotirat) is an aspiring musician who grew up to have met with several unlucky circumstances while growing up. In pursuit of his dream, he teamed up with Nueng (Purim Rattanaruangwattana) and GD (Harit Cheewagaroon) to form a band named "The Comet" under Mixx's (Witawat Singlampong) music label company "Mixx Musix" but was disbanded abruptly after their first single failed to be a hit.

During a party to celebrate one of "Mixx Musix"'s company artist, Jee came together with her close friend and co-employee Bono (Ployshompoo Supasap) who was wanting to find out what her flirtatious boyfriend Mixx was doing while she was not around. Nott also happened to be at the same event to convince Mixx to give their band another chance. Jee stumbled upon Nott alone and both of them got to talk to each other until they got drunk and unknowingly got into a one night stand. This resulted into a change of their fortunes where Jee suddenly got into several problems while Nott, together with his band, became famous.

For Jee to regain her fortune, she needs to reconnect with Nott where she applied to become his band's manager.

== Cast and characters ==
Below are the cast of the series:

=== Main ===
- Perawat Sangpotirat (Krist) as Nott
- Sutatta Udomsilp (Punpun) as Jee

=== Supporting ===
- Purim Rattanaruangwattana (Pluem) as Nueng
- Harit Cheewagaroon (Sing) as GD
- Ployshompoo Supasap (Jan) as Bono
- Thanaboon Wanlopsirinun (Na) as Putti
- Suphitcha Subannaphong (Jomjam) as Charm
- Witawat Singlampong (Ball) as Mixx

=== Guest ===
- Thanat Lowkhunsombat (Lee) as Himself

== Soundtrack ==
Song title	Romanized title	Artist(s)	Ref.
เสียงจากดาวพลูโต	Siang Jark Dao Plu To	Perawat Sangpotirat (Krist)	
ไม่กลัว	Mai Glua	Perawat Sangpotirat (Krist); Purim Rattanaruangwattana (Pluem); Harit Cheewagaroon (Sing)	
ไปด้วยกัน..ไหม?	Bpai Duay Gan Mai	Perawat Sangpotirat (Krist); Purim Rattanaruangwattana (Pluem); Harit Cheewagaroon (Sing)	
ยอดรัก ยอดไลก์	Yotrak Yotlai	Harit Cheewagaroon (Sing)	
ก่อนเขาตัดสินใจ	Korn Kao Tad Sin Jai	Purim Rattanaruangwattana (Pluem)	
คนโชคไม่ดีที่โชคดี	Kon Chok Mai Dee Tee Chok Dee	Perawat Sangpotirat (Krist)	
