= Cupid's Ghost =

2026 Thai upcoming television series

- Official pilot poster
- Thai: ผีผลักให้รักคุณ
- Genre: Romance; Comedy; Supernatural
- Directed by: Vorachai Nualsri
- Starring: Pirapat Watthanasetsiri; Sahaphap Wongratch
- Country of origin: Thailand
- Original language: Thai

Production
- Production companies: GMMTV; Cholumpi Brothers

Cupid's Ghost (Thai: ผีผลักให้รักคุณ lit. 'A ghost pushed me to love you') is an upcoming Thai supernatural boys' love series starring Pirapat Watthanasetsiri (Earth) and Sahaphap Wongratch (Mix).

The series will be directed by Vorachai Nualsri and produced by GMMTV and Cholumpi Brothers. It was announced during GMMTV'S Magic Vibes Maximized event on November 25, 2025.

== Synopsis ==
Florist Phut is afraid of ghosts and, therefore, funerals. When Phut startles at a ghost in Jett's funeral home, Jett offers him a job communicating with the recently deceased he provides services for.

== Cast and characters ==
=== Main ===
- Pirapat Watthanasetsiri (Earth) as Jett Sukhati
- Sahaphap Wongratch (Mix) as Phut

=== Supporting ===
- Harit Cheewagaroon (Sing) as Ing
- Wachirawit Ruangwiwat (Chimon) as Nile
- Kridchayaan Attavipach (Prom) as Jin Sukhati
- Thinnaphan Tantui (Thor)
