= Antique Bakery =

Japanese manga series by Fumi Yoshinaga

- Cover of the anime series DVD, featuring (from left) Kanda, Chikage, Ono, and Tachibana

西洋 骨董 洋菓子店 (Seiyō Kottō Yōgashiten)
- Genre: Comedy drama; Cooking; Slice of life
- Created by: Fumi Yoshinaga
- Manga
- Written by: Fumi Yoshinaga
- Published by: Shinshokan
- English publisher: NA: Digital Manga Publishing
- Imprint: Wings Comics
- Magazine: Wings
- Original run: June 1999 – September 2002
- Volumes: 4
- Television drama
- Directed by: Katsuyuki Motohiro; Eiichirō Hasumi
- Written by: Yoshikazu Okada
- Studio: Fuji Television
- Original network: FNS (Fuji TV)
- Original run: October 8, 2001 – December 17, 2001
- Episodes: 11
- Audio drama
- Studio: Shinshokan
- Original run: December 25, 2002 – March 25, 2003
- Episodes: 4
- Anime television series
- Directed by: Yoshiaki Okumura
- Written by: Natsuko Takahashi
- Studio: Nippon Animation; Shirogumi
- Licensed by: NA: AnimEigo
- Original network: Fuji TV (Noitamina)
- Original run: July 3, 2008 – September 18, 2008
- Episodes: 12
- International adaptations
- Antique (2008, South Korean film); Baker Boys (2021, Thai TV series)

Antique Bakery (Japanese: 西洋 骨董 洋菓子店, Hepburn: Seiyō Kottō Yōgashiten; lit. 'Western Antique Cake Shop') is a Japanese manga series written and illustrated by Fumi Yoshinaga. The slice of life series follows the lives of four men who work in a pâtisserie. It was originally serialized in the manga magazine Wings from 1999 to 2001, and collected into four tankōbon volumes published by Shinshokan; a spin-off dōjinshi (self-published manga) series has also been produced.

The series has been adapted multiple times: as a live-action television drama that aired on Fuji TV in 2001, as a four-volume audio drama released from 2002 to 2003, and as a television anime series produced by Nippon Animation and Shirogumi that aired on Fuji TV's Noitamina programming block in 2008. Two international adaptions – the 2008 South Korean live-action film Antique, and the 2021 Thai live-action television series Baker Boys – have also been produced. Antique Bakery and its adaptations have been critically acclaimed: the manga won a Kodansha Manga Award for best shōjo manga and the Japanese television drama won both the Nikkan Sports Drama Grand Prix and multiple Television Drama Academy Awards. The Antique Bakery manga was licensed for an English-language release by Digital Manga Publishing in 2005 and AnimEigo distributed the anime adaptation in North America.

== Synopsis ==
Antique Bakery follows the lives of the four workers at Antique, a pâtisserie in residential Tokyo: store owner and manager Keiichirō Tachibana, pastry chef Yusuke Ono, apprentice pastry chef Eiji Kanda, and waiter Chikage Kobayakawa. Antique is so named because the pâtisserie is located in a former antique shop, and uses antique tableware and furniture in its café. The series focuses on the men as they encounter a variety of comedic and dramatic scenarios, often focused on workplace comedy, the creation and development of pastries, or romantic intrigue. Though the series largely proceeds as a slice of life story without an overarching plot, Tachibana's desire to find the man who kidnapped him as a child is a recurring storyline; the series climaxes with Tachibana working with the police to find a child kidnapper.

== Characters ==
=== Primary characters ===
Keiichirō "Keisuke" Tachibana (橘 圭一郎, Tachibana Keiichirō)
Portrayed by: Kippei Shiina (Japanese television drama), Kōichi Yamadera (audio drama), Keiji Fujiwara (anime)
The owner of Antique. He is the son of a wealthy conglomerate-owning family; seeking to radically change his life, he quit his job at a trading company prior to the events of the series to open the pâtisserie. He was kidnapped at the age of nine, though he retains no memory of the incident beyond his kidnapper feeding him cake every day; consequently, he dislikes sweet foods.
Yusuke Ono (小野 裕介, Ono Yūsuke)
Portrayed by: Naohito Fujiki (Japanese television drama), Hozumi Gōda (audio drama), Shin-ichiro Miki (anime)
The pastry chef at Antique. Despite his skills as a baker, he has been fired from multiple bakeries due to his "demonic charm": any man he is attracted to will reciprocate his affections, regardless of their sexuality. The sole exception is Tachibana, who rejected Ono when they were high school classmates.
Eiji Kanda (神田 えいじ, Kanda Eiji)
Portrayed by: Hideaki Takizawa (Japanese television drama), Tomokazu Seki (audio drama), Mamoru Miyano (anime)
Ono's apprentice. A former delinquent, he reformed after a boxing coach trained him to be a top fighter, but was forced into early retirement as a result of his detached retinas. He has a strong sweet tooth, and joined Antique after seeing a "help wanted" sign in the bakery's window.
Chikage Kobayakawa (小早川 千影, Kobayakawa Chikage)
Portrayed by: Hiroshi Abe (Japanese television drama), Kazuhiko Inoue (audio drama), Eiji Hanawa (anime)
The stoic son of the Tachibana family's housekeeper, Chikage has known Tachibana since childhood and has become both a friend and caretaker to him. Though he appears intimidating due to his height and his ubiquitous black sunglasses (which he wears due to his weak eyes), in reality he is clumsy. He joins Antique as a waiter to watch over Tachibana. He falls in love with Ono.

=== Secondary characters ===
Tadahiro Akutagawa (芥川 忠宏, Akutagawa Tadahiro) (Note: Named Katsuo Munakata (宗像 克雄, Munakata Katsuo) in the Japanese television drama.)
Portrayed by: Kazunaga Tsuji (Japanese television drama), Norio Wakamoto (audio drama and anime)
A career bureaucrat at the National Police Agency who was in charge of Tachibana's kidnapping case. Now on a sinecure, he spends his ample free time visiting cake shops across Tokyo.
Kaede (楓子) (Note: Named Hideko Takeuchi (武内 秀子, Takeuchi Hideko) in the Japanese television drama.)
Portrayed by: Mia Murano (Japanese television drama), Fumiko Orikasa (audio drama), Tomomi Kasai (anime)
Chikage's daughter, is affectionately referred to as "Deko" or "Dei-Dei". She is in the fourth grade, but is frequently taken to be older due to her mature appearance.
Ito (伊東) & Urushihara (漆原)
Ito portrayed by: Manami Konishi (Japanese television drama), Fumiko Orikasa (audio drama), Umeka Shoji (anime)
Urushihara portrayed by: Mayumi Yanagisawa (audio drama), Misa Watanabe (anime)
Former middle school classmates who are regulars at Antique.
Jean-Baptiste
Portrayed by: Jūrōta Kosugi (audio drama), Kazuhiko Inoue (anime)
A famous pâtissier, and Ono's former mentor and ex-lover. He unsuccessfully attempts to persuade Ono to move to France to work in his new restaurant.
Haruka Nakatsu (中津 はるか, Nakatsu Haruka) & Tamiko "Tammy" Kagami (各務 民子, Kagami Tamiko)
Haruka portrayed by: Shizuka Ishikawa (audio drama), Yukiko Takaguchi (anime)
Tamiko portrayed by: Hiroko Taguchi (audio drama)
Two news presenters who cover Antique, leading to increased popularity for the business. In the anime adaptation, Tamiko is replaced by Fuji TV anchor Yukari Oshima playing herself.
Momoko Itsuki (飯塚 桃子, Itsuki Momoko)
Portrayed by: Koyuki (Japanese television drama)
A sports journalist who falls in love with Ono. Appears only in the Japanese television drama adaptation.

== Media ==
=== Manga ===
==== Main series ====
Antique Bakery was serialized in the monthly manga magazine Wings from June 1999 to September 2002. Upon its conclusion, the series was collected into four tankōbon (collected volumes) published by Shinshokan. In North America, Digital Manga Publishing published an English-language translation of Antique Bakery as four volumes published from 2000 to 2002, making Antique Bakery Yoshinaga's first manga series to be translated into English. Volumes in the English language release feature scratch and sniff covers.

No.	Original release date	Original ISBN	English release date	English ISBN
1	June 25, 2000	978-4-403-61588-7	July 16, 2005	978-1-56970-946-7
2	May 25, 2001	978-4-403-61628-0	November 1, 2005	978-1-56970-945-0
3	December 25, 2001	978-4-403-61652-5	March 22, 2006	978-1-56970-944-3
4	September 25, 2002	978-4-403-61690-7	June 7, 2006	978-1-56970-943-6

==== Spin-off dōjinshi series ====
Following the conclusion of the Antique Bakery manga series, Yoshinga began writing and illustrating Antique Afterwards (それからのアンティーク, Sore kara no Antiiku), a spin-off manga published as a series of dōjinshi (self-published fan comics). In contrast to the main manga series, Antique Afterwards is more overtly influenced by the yaoi (male-male romance, also known as boys' love or BL) genre, and has sexually-explicit content. This includes both sexual encounters merely alluded to in the original series and slash fiction-inspired scenarios that depict same-sex sexual encounters involving the series' canonically heterosexual characters; for example, in one such story, three female customers tell each other improvised erotic stories involving Antique's staff. Fourteen dōjinshi in the Antique Afterwards series have been created by Yoshinga.

=== Live-action television drama ===
In 2001, the manga was adapted into the live-action television drama Antique: The Western Cake Shop (アンティーク ～西洋骨董洋菓子店～, Antîku: Seiyô Kottô Yôgashiten), which aired on Fuji TV from October 8 to December 17, 2001. The series was directed by Katsuyuki Motohiro and Eiichirō Hasumi, and written by Yoshikazu Okada. Its theme song, "Youthful Days", is written and performed by Mr. Children. The series removes all depictions of same-sex romance and LGBT identity present in the original manga; for example, Ono is not gay, but has a fear of women and is romantically pursued by an original female character not present in the manga.

==== List of episodes ====
No.	Title	Directed by	Original release date
1	"Tenshi no Hane (天使の羽)"	Katsuyuki Motohiro	October 8, 2001
2	"Ai no Ido (愛の井戸)"	Katsuyuki Motohiro	October 15, 2001
3	"Shitorasu no Tanjōbi (シトラスの誕生日)"	Eiichirō Hasumi	October 22, 2001
4	"Chīsana Hoshi (小さな星)"	Eiichirō Hasumi	October 29, 2001
5	"Kako Kara no Okurimono (過去からの贈り物)"	Katsuyuki Motohiro	November 5, 2001
6	"Mishiranu Kioku (見知らぬ記憶)"	Eiichirō Hasumi	November 12, 2001
7	"Suterareta Omoide (捨てられた思い出)"	Katsuyuki Motohiro	November 19, 2001
8	"Kokuhaku (告白)"	Eiichirō Hasumi	November 26, 2001
9	"Kinji Rareta Yorokobi (禁じられた歓び)"	Katsuyuki Motohiro	December 3, 2001
10	"Hametsu and no Idenshi (破滅への遺伝子)"	Eiichirō Hasumi	December 10, 2001
11	"Owarinakitabi (終わりなき旅)"	Katsuyuki Motohiro	December 17, 2001

=== Audio drama ===
From 2003 to 2004, Shinshokan produced an audio drama adaptation of Antique Bakery. The adaptation was released as four compact disc volumes:

Title	Release Date	JAN	Ref.
Antique Bakery Vol. 1	December 25, 2002	JAN 4560219321663	
Antique Bakery Vol. 2	January 25, 2003	JAN 4560219321670	
Antique Bakery Vol. 3	February 25, 2003	JAN 4560219321687	
Antique Bakery Vol. 4	March 25, 2003	JAN 4560219321694	

=== Anime ===
In March 2008, Nippon Animation and Shirogumi announced that they would produce an anime adaptation of Antique Bakery, which aired on Fuji TV's Noitamina programming block from July to September of that year. The series' primary production staff included Yoshiaki Okumura as series director and Natsuko Takahashi as scriptwriter; the cakes and pastries depicted in the series were designed by pastry chef Toshihiko Yoroizuka. The series' theme song "Life Goes On" was written and performed by the band Chemistry. In North America, the series was formerly licensed by Nozomi Entertainment, which released Antique Bakery on DVD on April 5, 2011.

On July 31, 2026, AnimEigo announced at Otakon they had rescued the anime series for a North American Blu-ray release in 2027.

==== List of episodes ====
No.	Title	Storyboard	Directed by	Original release date
1	"Reunion"	Takahiro Okao	Takahiro Okao	July 4, 2008
2	"Eiji's Situation"	Yoshiaki Okumura	Takashi Morimiya	July 11, 2008
3	"The Fourth Man"	Miho Hirao	Miho Hirao	July 18, 2008
4	"The Source of the Nightmare"	Katsuyuki Kodera	Yasuo Tsuchiya	July 25, 2008
5	"An Antique Trial"	Yoshiaki Okumura	Takahiro Okao	August 1, 2008
6	"An Antique Crisis"	Yoshinori Odaka	Yoshinori Odaka	August 8, 2008
7	"An Antique Christmas"	Katsuyuki Kodera	Yasushi Kushibiki	August 15, 2008
8	"Chikage's Secret"	Miho Hirao & Yoshiaki Okumura	Yasuro Tsuchiya	August 22, 2008
9	"Eiji's Melancholy"	Yusuke Fujikawa	Yusuke Fujikawa & Taiji Kawanishi	August 29, 2008
10	"For the Sake of This Day"	Hideki Hosokawa	Tosei Yamauchi	September 5, 2008
11	"The Criminal"	Yoshinori Odaka	Shinpei Ezaki	September 12, 2008
12	"The Unending Nightmare"	Yoshiaki Okumura	Yoshinori Odaka	September 19, 2008

=== International adaptations ===
A South Korean film adaptation titled Antique (Korean: 서양골동양과자점 앤티크, Seoyang-gol Dongyang-gwaja-jeom Antique), was released on November 13, 2008. The film was directed by Min Kyu-dong and starred Ju Ji-hoon as Kim Jin-hyeok (Tachibana in the original series), Kim Jae-wook as Min Seon-woo (Ono), Yoo Ah-in as Yang Ki-beom (Kanda), and Choi Ji-ho as Nam Soo-yeong (Chikage). In December 2020, Thai production company GMMTV announced that it was producing a live-action television adaptation of Antique Bakery titled Baker Boys. The series, which stars Thanat Lowkhunsombat as Poon (Tachibana in the original series), Prachaya Ruangroj as Weir (Ono), Purim Rattanaruangwattana as Krating (Kanda), and Pat Eksanegkul as P'Pooh (Chikage), aired on GMM 25 in 2021.

== Reception ==
=== Critical reception ===
Antique Bakery is noted as Yoshinaga's first major commercial success as a manga artist, following a career in which she was best known as an author of boys' love (BL) and dōjinshi. In Manga: The Complete Guide, writer Jason Thompson gave the manga series four out of five stars, writing that it avoids "cliched sitcom plot while managing to be both character-driven and totally hilarious," and praised its pacing, artwork, and dialogue. Reviewing the series for The Comics Journal, Noah Berlatsky wrote that its "pop Freudianism is depressingly ill-advised" in regards to the tragic backstories of the primary characters, while he praised the series' art and character designs. In his review for Anime News Network, Jason Thompson commended the series' simple art, and praised it as "one of the few bishonen manga which depicts gay characters and prejudice in even a remotely realistic way."

Reviewing the anime adaptation for Anime News Network, Carl Kimlinger praised the series' animation and characters but criticized its romance and kidnapping subplots, writing that Antique Bakery "top-loads its plot with preposterous romantic entanglements and forces unnecessary structure onto it with Tachibana's kidnapping." Cathy Yan lauded the series' voice acting in her review for Manga Bookshelf, but criticized its animation as overly reliant on CGI elements.

=== Awards ===
The Antique Bakery manga series won the Kodansha Manga Award in the shōjo category in 2002, and the English-language translation was nominated for an Eisner Award for "Best U.S. Edition of International Material – Japan" in 2007. At the 31st Television Drama Academy Awards in 2001, the Japanese television drama adaptation won awards in the Best Series, Supporting Actor (for Kippei Shiina), Theme Song, Music, Casting, and Title Sequence categories; a special award was also given to Tsuji Confectionery College for the design of the pastries and baked goods used in the series. In 2002, the Japanese television drama adaptation won the Nikkan Sports Drama Grand Prix for Best Drama and Best Actor (for Hideaki Takizawa).

== Analysis ==
=== Portrayal of cooking and gender ===
Tomoko Aoyama has considered the depiction of cooking in Antique Bakery in relation to the Japanese concepts of hare (晴れ; used to describe things that are special and exotic) and ke (ケ; used to describe things that are mundane and trivial). While the elaborate cakes and pastries of Antique Bakery are self-evidently hare, she notes how Antique Bakery complicates the hare-ke dichotomy through its presentation of gender. While male professional cooking and connoisseurship are generally regarded as hare and female cooking is seen as ke, the main characters of Antique Bakery subvert "assumptions based on age, gender, sexuality, appearance, occupation, education, class, [and] status." For example, Ono is a skilled chef but is coded as female as a result of his homosexuality, while Kanda is regarded by others as cute (a feminine trait) but vulgar (a masculine trait). Desserts in general are seemingly ke for being delicate and "unmanly", but their exoticism as French pastries for a Japanese clientele, as well as the level of skill and craftsmanship required to create them, renders them as hare.

=== Portrayal of homosexuality ===
Yoshinaga has described Antique Bakery as not a work of BL, but as a shōjo manga with gay characters, stating that "being regarded as BL may limit the range of the audience, but there's nothing I can do about it, and more importantly, I want my readers to read as they like. Surely we should be allowed to read manga with whatever dogma and prejudice we like." Critics and readers have often considered the series as a work of BL, with Xuan Bach Tran describing Antique Bakery as "not a BL manga, but a shōjo work with a lot of BL flavour." Tomoko Aoyama states that while BL elements are "clearly present" in Antique Bakery, in contrast to typical BL works the series does not depict sex or sexuality graphically, and instead "encourages readers to use their imagination" in regards to the nature of the relationships between the characters. She praises the series' effective "use and parody [of] BL conventions," particularly Antique Afterwards, which she commends as "by no means simple, formulaic pornography" but instead a series that subverts expectations of BL narratives through their use of comedy and irony.

Akiko Mizoguchi discusses Antique Afterwards in her research of yaoi dōjinshi, noting that while most dōjinshi are derivative works created by fan artists, Antique Afterwards is notable as a fan work created by the artist themselves. Mizoguchi considers the series a form of underground comics despite being created by Yoshinaga, noting that the series contains material that would be regarded as too explicit by shōjo editorial standards, and that Antique Bakery publisher Shinshokan has not acknowledged the existence of Antique Afterwards in either Wings or in the series' tankōbon editions.
