= UMG (TV series) =

2023 Thai television series

- Official series poster
- รักแรกหายไป ได้ใครมาวะ?
- Genre: Mystery; Romance; Science fiction
- Written by: Methus Sirinawin
- Directed by: Thanate Limchaloen
- Starring: Korapat Kirdpan; Tipnaree Weerawatnodom; Pansa Vosbein
- Country of origin: Thailand
- Original language: Thai
- No. of episodes: 12

Production
- Running time: 48 minutes
- Production companies: GMMTV; Parbdee Taweesuk

Original release
- Network: GMM 25; TrueID
- Release: 12 March – 4 June 2023

Unidentified Mysterious Girlfriend (Thai: รักแรกหายไป ได้ใครมาวะ?; RTGS: Rak Raek Hai Pai Dai Khrai Ma Wa?, lit. My First Love Disappeared, Who Did I Get?) is a Thai science fiction romantic television series starring Korapat Kirdpan (Nanon), Pansa Vosbein (Milk) and Tipnaree Weerawatnodom (Namtan). Directed by Thanate Limchaloen (Kyo) and produced by GMMTV together with Parbdee Taweesuk, it was announced as one of the television series of GMMTV for 2022 during their "GMMTV2022: BORDERLESS" event held on December 1, 2021. It officially premiered on GMM 25 and TrueID on March 12, 2023, and ran until June 4, 2023.

== Synopsis ==
Mew's (Korapat Kirdpan) first childhood love, Erng (Pansa Vosbein), disappeared from their secret base, a place for them to play in the forest, without a trace on a meteor shower night when they were kids. Eight years later, she suddenly returns. However, the current her feels completely different from the old her... Therefore, where did "she" go? And what happened to her these past eight years?

Some time before that, Mew is already a university student. He's always immersed in guilt, blaming himself for being the reason Erng disappeared. He could only wait for Erng to return one day until he becomes an antisocial person. His only remaining friend is Jack (Sattabut Laedeke), a former delinquent who often bullied him when he was a child. One day, Professor Kit (Thanakorn Chinakul), his advisor, forced Mew and Jack to become members of the 'Mystery Research Club', which allowed Mew to meet new friends, such as O (Harit Cheewagaroon), a senior whose hobby is hunting monsters, and Fahsai (Tipnaree Weerawatnodom), a beautiful woman who believes in the existence of aliens. Even though it's a strange club, Mew starts to open his heart to new friends and the chance to have a new love...

But suddenly, Erng comes back. However, she doesn't remember anything about the time she disappeared. Furthermore, it seems like she has superhuman powers. The strangeness doesn't end there when "42" (Madame Mod), a mysterious creature from outer space, suddenly appears to find Erng. This mystery leads the members of the Mystery Research Club to find the truth.

== Cast and characters ==
=== Main ===
- Korapat Kirdpan (Nanon) as Mew
- Tipnaree Weerawatnodom (Namtan) as Fahsai
- Pansa Vosbein (Milk) as Erng

=== Supporting ===
- Harit Cheewagaroon (Sing) as O
- Sattabut Laedeke (Drake) as Jack
- Thanakorn Chinakul (Beau) as Professor Kit
- Kittipat Chalaragse (Golf) as Doctor Nam
- Madame Mod as 42
- Nantapat Apiwat (Neve) as young Mew
- Keetapat Pongruea (Pleng) as young Erng
- Anastasia Maslova as Kate

=== Guest ===
- Thanaset Suriyapornchaikul (Euro) as Boss (Ep. 1)
- Varakorn Varuncharoentham (Mon) as arcade employee (Ep. 1)
