= Purim Rattanaruangwattana =

Thai actor, model and singer (born 1997)

- ปุริม รัตนเรืองวัฒนา
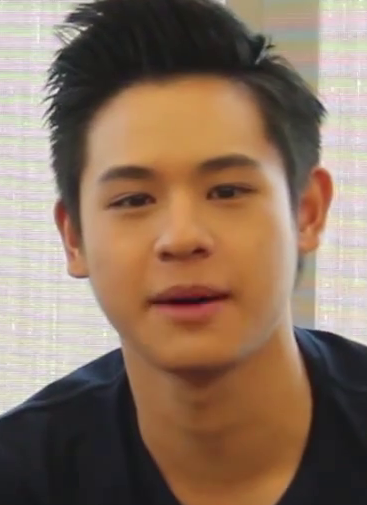
- Purim in 2014
- Born: 21 May 1997 (age 29); Chiang Mai Province, Thailand
- Other name: Pluem
- Education: Chiang Mai University –Political Science and Public Admin.
- Occupations: Actor; singer
- Years active: 2013–present
- Agent: GMMTV (2016–2023)
- Notable work: Inthanu in My Dear Loser; Tonmai in Happy Birthday

Purim Rattanaruangwattana (Thai: ปุริม รัตนเรืองวัฒนา, born 21 May 1997), nicknamed Pluem, is a Thai actor and singer. He started acting in the 2013 movie Grean Fictions and its sequel TV series, Grean House. He has done both film and television in succeeding years.

Pluem is perhaps best known for his role as Inthanu (“In”) in the GMM 25 series My Dear Loser: Edge of 17. Pluem later reprised the role of Inthanu in My Dear Loser: Happy Ever After and the anthology series Our Skyy.

== Personal life ==
Purim was born and raised in Chiang Mai Province, Thailand, the second of two children, having one older brother. He speaks Northern Thai in a Bangkok accent. He has a Chinese father and a Thai mother. His nickname "Pluem" means joy and happiness in Thai.

In 2016, he graduated from The Prince Royal's College in Chiang Mai, Thailand.

Currently, he studies at the Faculty of Political Science and Public Administration, Chiang Mai University. As a student, his goal is to keep a GPA of 3 and above. In August 2019, Pluem started his internship.

== Career ==
In order to fulfill his childhood dream of becoming a policeman, Pluem went to a supplementary school. There, he met film director Chookiat Sakveerakul while passing by the director's studio.

Thus, his acting career started in 2013. He initially thought his career would end after the film Grean Fictions. However, he grew fond of it after doing more films and shows.

In 2015 Pluem was a member and used to be bassit of the now defunct boy pop band SLEEPRUNWAY together with Kao Jirayu-La-ongmanee, JJ Kritsanapoom Pibulsonggram, Nontanun Anchuleepradit and Chalat Gamol.

His television credits from 2014 to 2017 include Greanhouse: The Series, Fly To Fin, Slam Dance, and the My Dear Loser series.

In 2017, Pluem co-starred in the Thai horror movie Siam Square.

In 2018, aside from reprising the role of Inthanu in the anthology series Our Skyy, Pluem starred in the critically acclaimed Thai drama Happy Birthday: The Series, where he played the leading role of Tonmai, a neglected boy whose sister died on the day he was born.

Pluem frequently collaborates with fellow GMMTV artists, most popularly with Chimon Wachirawit Ruangwiwat, who played the character of Sun opposite Pluem's Inthanu in My Dear Loser and Our Skyy.

His next series is One Night Steal, wherein he co-stars with SOTUS star and fellow Our Skyy alumnus Krist Perawat Sangpotirat as well as Sing Harit Cheewagaroon, Jan Ployshompoo Supasap, and Punpun Sutatta Udomsilp. The show premiered on November 24, 2019.

In 2021, Purim portrayed the role of "Krathing" (manga name: Eiji Kanda), a retired boxer because of his medical condition, turned into a baker in the Thai adaptation of Antique Bakery, known as Baker Boys with Singto Prachaya, Lee Thanat and Foei Patara.

In 2022, Purim portrayed the role of "Non", Meen's boyfriend who is cheating her with on her friend Wanwan in P.S. I Hate You. Through this drama he collaborated with his previous co-stars Jan Ployshompoo from One Night Steal and Lee Thanat from Baker Boys. In the series, Jan plays the role of Purim's girlfriend (Meen) and Lee plays Meen's ex boyfriend.

== Filmography ==
=== Film ===
Year	Film title	Role	Notes
2013	Grean Fictions	Mon (ม่อน)	Main
2017	Siam Square	Muwan	Supporting

=== Television ===
Year	Title	Role	Notes
2013	Carabao	Porn	Main
2014	Greanhouse	Mon	Main
2015	Fly to Fin	Ongkharak "Nun"	Main
2016	Love Songs Love Stories: Rao Mee Rao	Weera	Main
2016	Love Songs Love Series: Kaup Koon Tee Ruk Gun	Nan	Supporting
2017	Love Songs Love Series To Be Continued: Kaup Koon Tee Ruk Gun	Nan	Supporting
2017	Slam Dance	Ryu	Main
2017	My Dear Loser: Edge of 17	Inthanu "In"	Main
2017	Please...Seiyng Reiyk Wiyyan	Ghost	Guest
2017	My Dear Loser: Happy Ever After	Inthanu "In"	Guest
2018	Happy Birthday	Tonmai	Main
2018	Our Skyy	Inthanu "In"	Main
2019	One Night Steal	Nueng	Supporting
2020	Angel Beside Me	Angel	Guest
2020	Friend Zone 2: Dangerous Area	Locker	Main
2021	Baker Boys	Krating	Main
2022	Enchanté	Krating	Guest
2022	P.S. I Hate You	Chanon "Non"	Supporting
2022	10 Years Ticket	"Mai" Kawee Siraphuchaya	Supporting
2023	Don't Touch My Gang	Ohm	Main

== Discography ==
Singles

Year	Title	Label	Ref.
2017	อย่าทำร้าย; Yah Tum Rai	GMM Grammy	
2020	ก่อนเขาตัดสินใจ; Korn Kao Tad Sin Jai	GMM Grammy	

Sleep Runway

Year	Title	Label	Ref.
2015	พร้อมเสี่ยง; Phrom Siang	—N/a	
2015	เผื่อเธอยังไม่รู้ Phuea Thoe Yang Mai Ru	True4U	
2015	ฝันของเรา; Fan Khong Rao	True4U	

The Comet (One Night Steal)

Year	Title	Label	Ref.
2020	ไม่กลัว; Mai Glua	GMM Grammy	
2020	ไปด้วยกัน..ไหม? Pai Duai Kan...Mai?	GMM Grammy	
