= Wachirawit Ruangwiwat =

Thai actor and model (born 2000)

- วชิรวิชญ์ เรืองวิวรรธน์
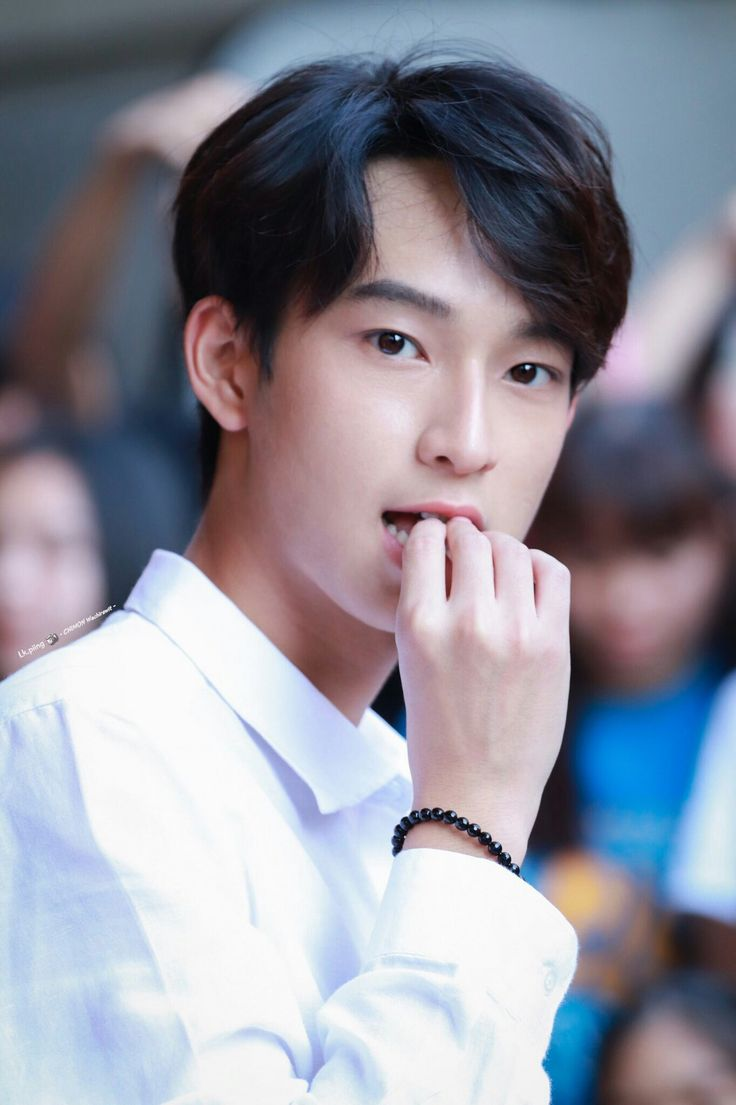
- Wachirawit in 2020
- Born: 15 January 2000 (age 26); Bangkok, Thailand
- Other name: Chimon
- Education: Assumption College; Bangkok University (School of Digital Media and Cinematic Arts)
- Occupation: Actor
- Years active: 2015–present
- Agent: GMMTV
- Known for: Sun in My Dear Loser; Wave in The Gifted; Andrew in Blacklist

Wachirawit Ruangwiwat (Thai: วชิรวิชญ์ เรืองวิวรรธน์; born 15 January 2000), nicknamed Chimon / Chimonac (Thai: ชิม่อน), is a Thai actor. He is known for his main roles as Sun in GMMTV's My Dear Loser: Edge of 17 (2017), Wave in The Gifted (2018), The Gifted: Graduation (2020) and Andrew in Blacklist (2019).

== Early life and education ==
Wachirawit was born in Bangkok, Thailand. He completed his secondary education at Assumption College, where he became one of its football athletes. In 2023, he earned a Bachelor's degree in Film Studies from the School of Digital Media and Cinematic Arts at Bangkok University.

== Career ==
Wachirawit started in the entertainment industry with his appearance in the film 13 Beloved (2006). He officially debuted as an actor in 2015 as part of the movie Ghost Ship (2015) and later on got the main role for Sweet Boy (2016). He went on to be part of the television series Senior Secret Love: My Lil Boy 2 (2016), where he played the role of Toy. He has been an artist of GMMTV since 2015.

On June 27, 2024, GMMTV announced that Wachirawit would be taking a break from his career due to depression.

== Filmography ==
=== Film ===
Year	Title	Role	Notes	Ref.
2006	13 Beloved	Child	Guest role	
2015	Ghost Ship		Guest role	
2016	Sweet Boy	Nack	Main role	
2019	SisterS	Wen	Supporting role	
2023	My Precious	Bank	Supporting role	

=== Television ===
Key
†	Denotes television productions that have not yet been released

Year	Title	Role	Notes	Ref.
2016	Senior Secret Love: My Lil Boy 2	Toy	Supporting role	
2017	My Dear Loser: Edge of 17	Sun	Main role	
2017	Please... Seiyng Reiyk Wiyyan	Win	Main role	
2017	My Dear Loser: Happy Ever After	Sun	Guest role	
2018	School Rangers	Himself	Main host	
2018	Beauty & The Babes My First Date	Himself	Main host	
2018	YOUniverse	Earth	Main role	
2018	Love Songs Love Series: Seb Tid Kwam Jeb Puad	Nui	Main role	
2018	The Gifted	"Wave" Wasuthorn Worachotmethee	Main role	
2018	Happy Birthday	Phana (young)	Supporting role	
2018	Our Skyy	Sun	Main role	
2019	He's Coming to Me	Prince	Supporting role	
2019	Samee See Thong	Parn	Supporting role	
2019	Blacklist	Andrew	Main role	
2020	The Gifted: Graduation	"Wave" Wasuthorn Worachotmethee	Main role	
2021	Put Your Head on My Shoulder	Tar	Supporting role	
2021	The Player	Dan / Danai	Main role	
2022	School Tales The Series: A Walk in School	Tum	Main role	
2022	Never Let Me Go	Ben	Supporting role	
2023	Home School	Pennueng	Main role	
2023	Dangerous Romance	Sailom Homchan	Main role	
2024	My Precious The Series	Bank	Supporting role	
2025	Hide & Sis	Thana	Supporting role	
2025	The Dark Dice	Atom	Guest role	
2025	Dare You to Death	Champ	Supporting role	
2026	Match Point	Kong	Supporting role	
2026	Gunshot †	Koh	Supporting role	
TBA	Police Chap Khamoi †	TBA	Main role	
TBA	Cupid's Ghost †	Nile	Supporting role	

=== Music video appearances ===
Year	Song Title	Artist(s)	Role	Notes	Ref.
2015	"รักเธอคนเดียว" (Ruk Tur Kon Diao/One Love)	Nat Sakdatorn		Official music video	
2016	"เหตุผลที่ไม่มีเหตุผล" (Hetpon Tee Mai Mee Hetpon)	Getsunova		Official music video	
2017	"ทนได้ทุกที" (Ton Dai Took Tee)	Matung Radubdow		Official music video	
2017	"ออกตัว" (Auk Tua)	Lipta	Sun	OST. My Dear Loser: Edge of 17	
2018	"จักรวาลเธอ" (Jukkrawahn Tur)	Korapat Kirdpan (Nanon)	Earth	OST. YOUniverse	
2021	"เด็ด" (Ded)	Pixxie		Official music video	
2023	"ไม่ต้องเป็นแฟนก็ได้" (Here with You)	Tanapon Sukumpantanasan	Sailom Homchan	Official music video	

== Discography ==
=== Singles ===
Year	Title	Label	Notes	Ref.
2024	"Over the Moon (คืนนี้แค่มีเรา)" with Tanapon Sukumpantanasan	GMMTV		
2024	"You're My Treasure" with various artists	GMMTV	Love Out Loud Fan Fest 2024 Theme	

=== Soundtrack appearances ===
Year	Title	Label	Notes	Ref.
2024	"สายลม (Wind)"	GMMTV	Dangerous Romance OST	
2024	ซบกันไปนานๆ (Sunset)" with Tanapon Sukumpantanasan	GMMTV	Dangerous Romance OST	
