= Slam Dance (TV series) =

2017 Thai television series

- Official series poster
- Thai: Slam Dance – ทุ่มฝันสนั่นฟลอร์
- Genre: Romance; Drama
- Created by: GMMTV
- Starring: Pimchanok Luevisadpaibul; Chutavuth Pattarakampol; Purim Rattanaruangwattana
- Country of origin: Thailand
- Original language: Thai
- No. of episodes: 13

Production
- Producer: Studio Commuan
- Running time: 50 minutes
- Production companies: GMMTV; Studio Commuan

Original release
- Network: One31; LINE TV; GMM 25 (Rerun)
- Release: 13 May – 5 August 2017

Slam Dance (Thai: Slam Dance – ทุ่มฝันสนั่นฟลอร์; Slam Dance – Thum Fan Sanan Flo) is a 2017 Thai television series starring Pimchanok Luevisadpaibul (Baifern), Chutavuth Pattarakampol (March) and Purim Rattanaruangwattana (Pluem).

Produced by GMMTV together with Studio Commuan, the series was one of the six television series for 2017 showcased by GMMTV in their "6 Natures+" event on 2 March 2017. It premiered on One31 and LINE TV on 13 May 2017, airing on Saturdays at 22:00 ICT and 23:00 ICT, respectively. The series concluded on 5 August 2017 and was rerun on GMM 25 last 2019.

== Cast and characters ==
Below are the cast of the series:

=== Main ===
- Pimchanok Luevisadpaibul (Baifern) as Fang
- Chutavuth Pattarakampol (March) as Singh
- Purim Rattanaruangwattana (Pluem) as Ryu

=== Supporting ===
- Ployshompoo Supasap (Jan) as Praemai
- Sivakorn Lertchuchot (Guy) as Bas
- Raisarat Prinee (Preen) as Namfon
- Kornrawich Sungkibool (Q) as Junior
- Korn Khunatipapisiri (Oaujun) as Ken
- Tipnaree Weerawatnodom (Namtan) as Woon
- Pattadon Janngeon (Fiat) as Graph
- Harit Cheewagaroon (Sing) as Nick
- Sattabut Laedeke (Drake) as Pob
