= Korapat Kirdpan =

Thai actor and singer (born 2000)

- กรภัทร์ เกิดพันธุ์
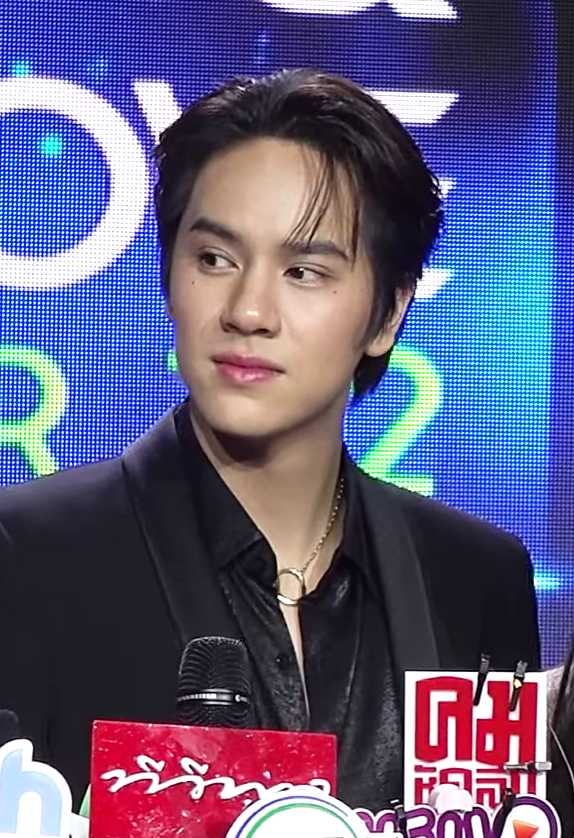
- Korapat in April 2024
- Born: Korapat Kirdpan; 18 December 2000 (age 25); Bangkok, Thailand
- Other names: Nanon, Triple N
- Education: Srinakharinwirot University
- Occupations: Actor; Singer; MC; YouTuber
- Years active: 2014–present
- Agent: GMMTV
- Known for: Pang in The Gifted and The Gifted: Graduation; Pran in Bad Buddy Series; Traffic in Blacklist; Oh in My Dear Loser
- Height: 183 cm (6 ft 0 in)

Korapat Kirdpan (Thai: กรภัทร์ เกิดพันธุ์, RTGS: Koraphat Koetphan; born 18 December 2000), nicknamed Nanon (Thai: นนน), is a Thai actor and singer. He began appearing in television commercials before transitioning to prominent roles in numerous television dramas and series. He is best known for his leading roles in My Dear Loser (2017), The Gifted (2018), Blacklist (2019), and Bad Buddy (2021).

== Early life and education ==
Korapat was born in Bangkok, Thailand. He is the son of Thai actor Khunakorn Kirdpan and Poonsuk Kirdpan, and has a younger sister, Pitchaporn. At the age of 13, he was temporarily ordained as a novice Buddhist monk. He completed his secondary education at Amatyakul School and later studied acting and directing for cinema at the College of Social Communication Innovation, Srinakharinwirot University.

== Career ==
Korapat entered the entertainment industry at age three by appearing in television commercials. He made his television acting debut in 2014 with a guest role as M in the youth drama series Hormones 2, a role he reprised in Hormones 3 (2015). In 2015, he played supporting roles in the television series Ugly Duckling Series: Don't and Love Flight.

In 2016, he received his first leading role in Senior Secret Love: My Lil Boy and its sequel, starring alongside Kanyawee Songmuang, followed by a main role in My Dear Loser: Edge of 17 (2017). From 2018 to 2024, he also served as a co-host for the variety show School Rangers. He gained wider recognition in 2018 after starring as Pawaret "Pang" Sukolwittaya in the sci-fi thriller series The Gifted (2018). The following year, he starred as Traffic in the mystery action series Blacklist (2019). He later reprised his breakthrough role in the 2020 sequel, The Gifted: Graduation (2020).

In 2021, Korapat starred alongside Pawat Chittsawangdee in the boys' love television series Bad Buddy. Following the broadcast, the cast held a series of fan meetings across South Korea, Taiwan, Hong Kong, Vietnam, Singapore, and the Philippines. For his contribution to the series soundtrack, "Just Friend?", he won the Best Theme Song award at the 27th Asian Television Awards. He later reprised his role in the 2023 anthology series Our Skyy 2.

In 2023, he held main roles in UMG (Unidentified Mysterious Girlfriend), Midnight Series: Dirty Laundry, and The Jungle, where he played the dual roles of twins Nanam and Nanfah. The same year, he starred in the romantic drama film My Precious, later reprising his role in the 2024 television adaptation, My Precious The Series. Alongside his acting projects, Korapat transitioned into a solo recording artist under GMMTV's music label, Riser Music. On 3 November 2023, he released his debut solo studio album, The Secrets of the Universe, which was preceded by the lead single "Unidentified Wonder".

In April 2024, Korapat was announced as part of the main cast for GMMTV's adaptation of the historical romance fantasy series Scarlet Heart Ullavee (2026), in the role of Prince Saen Thep. In early 2025, he expanded his discography by releasing the two-part musical project My Girl Side A and My Girl Side B. Later that year, he starred opposite Atitaya Tribudarak in the romantic comedy series I Love 'A Lot Of' You and released his subsequent solo studio album, SEVEN, on 7 November 2025.

== Filmography ==
=== Film ===
Year	Title	Role	Notes
2015	SPL II: A Time for Consequences	Victim	Supporting role
2016	Little Big Dream	Phum	Supporting role
2021	Bookworm Beauty (Mỹ Nhân Thần Sách)	Dinh Quan	Vietnamese & Thai co-production film
2022	SLR	Dan	Main role
2023	My Precious	Tong	Main role

=== Television series ===
Key
†	Denotes television productions that have not yet been released

Year	Title	Role	Notes
2013	E-Sa Raweechuangchoti (The Actress)	Cleaning boy	Guest role (Ep. 16)
2014	Hormones The Series Season 2	M (Oil's brother)	Guest (Ep.10)
2015	Ugly Duckling Series: Don't	Plawan	Supporting
2015	Hormones 3 The Final Season	M (Oil's brother)	Guest role (Ep. 11, 13)
2015	Wonder Teacher	Book	Main role
2015	Love Flight	Ah Pat	Supporting role
2016	Senior Secret Love: My Lil Boy	S	Main role
2016	Senior Secret Love: My Lil Boy 2	S	Main role
2017	The Legend of King Naresuan: The Series	Prince Mingyi Swa	Main role
2017	Ra Rerng Fai	Chacrit	Guest role
2017	My Dear Loser: Edge of 17	Oh	Main role
2017	Ways To Protect Relationship	Jay	Main role (Ep.3)
2017	My Dear Loser: Happy Ever After	Oh	Guest role (Ep. 8, 10, 12)
2018	YOUniverse	Knight	Main role
2018	The Gifted	"Pang" Pawaret Sermrittirong	Main role
2019	Blacklist	Traffic	Main role
2020	Turn Left Turn Right	Tai	Main role
2020	The Gifted: Graduation	"Pang" Pawaret Sermrittirong	Main role
2020	The Leaked	Tor	Main role
2021	Remember You	Charas	Guest role (Ep. 6-7)
2021	Sud Rai Sud Ruk	Thin Phanidkidchaitham (Child)	Guest
2021	Bad Buddy	"Pran" Parakul Siridechawat	Main role
2021	55:15 Never Too Late	San	Main role
2022	Vice Versa	Tun	Guest role
2023	UMG (Unidentified Mysterious Girlfriend)	Mew	Main role
2023	Midnight Series: Dirty Laundry	Night	Main role
2023	Midnight Museum	Ton / The One / Dome	Guest (Ep. 5-7, 10)
2023	The Jungle	Nannam / Nanfah	Main role
2023	Our Skyy 2	"Pran" Parakul Siridechawat	Main role
2024	My Precious The Series	Tong	Main role
2025	Ossan's Love Thailand	Himself	Guest role (Ep. 11)
2025	I Love 'A Lot Of' You	Sun	Main role
2026	Scarlet Heart Ullavee	Saen Thep, Prince Rajawongse	Main role
TBA	High & Low: Born to Be High †	G-Foei	Main role
TBA	52Hz †	Kharin	Main role

=== Music video appearances ===
Year	Title	Artist	Role	Ref.
2017	กว่าจะรู้ใจตัวเอง; Gwah Ja Roo Jai Tua Eng	Himself	S	
2017	ดีต่อใจ; Dee Tau Jai	Matung Radubdow	Non	
2017	ออกตัว; Auk Tua	Lipta	Oh	
2018	YOUniverse (จักรวาลเธอ); YOUniverse (Juk Ka Wan Tur)	Himself	Knight	
2019	YOUniverse (จักรวาลเธอ) - Special Version	Himself	Knight	
2019	ทำตัวไม่ถูก; Thamtua Mai Thuk	Chino Atipat	Junior	
2020	มาร์ชศรีนครินทร (Srinakharin March)	Saranyu Winaipanit	Student	
2020	ใจโทรมๆ (2020); Chai Som Som (2020)	KH.SD Thaitanium	Boy at a bar	
2020	เปลี่ยนคะแนนเป็นแฟนได้ไหม (Love Score)	SIZZY	Himself	
2020	มองกี่ทีก็น่ารัก (Cute Cute)	Himself	Himself	
2021	สวัสดีความรัก (Glad To See You); Sawatdi Khwam Rak	Sandy Yanisa	Senior	
2021	แลกมาด้วยความโง่ Laek Ma Duai Khwamngo	Boy Peacemaker	Non	
2021	จักรวาลที่ฉันต้องการมีแค่เธอ (My Universe is You)	Himself	Film shop owner	
2021	แค่เพื่อนมั้ง (Just Friend?); Khae Phuean Mang	Himself	Pran	
2021	จะไม่บอกใครละกันว่าเธอชอบฉันก่อน (Secret); Cha Mai Bok Khrai La Kan Wa Thoe Chop Chan Kon	Kacha Nontanun	Pran	
2022	เพลงที่เพิ่งเขียนจบ (Our Song); Pleng Tee Peung Khean Jhob	Himself	Pran	
2022	กราวกีฬาใหม่ (The Spirit of Sport)	Himself	Coach	
2022	Bad Boy	Himself	Friend of music owner	
2022	สิ่งมหัศจรรย์ที่ไม่มีรูปแบบ (Unidentified Wonder)	Himself	Actor on set	

=== Web shows ===
Year	Title	Role	Note	Ref.
2022	Ohm Nanon UpVel	Host	with Pawat Chittsawangdee	
2024	Brother "say hi"	Guest	with Erik, Trấn Thành	

=== Live performances ===
Year	Title	Artist	Venue	Ref.
2022	O-N Friend City Ohm Nanon (1st Fan Meeting in Thailand)	Ohm, Nanon	Union Hall, 6F, Union Mall	
2023	OhmNanon 1st Fan Meeting in Manila	Ohm, Nanon	Samsung Hall - SM Aura Premier	
2023	OhmNanon 1st Fan Meeting in Vietnam	Ohm, Nanon	Nha Hat Ben Thanh, Ho Chi Minh City	
2023	OhmNanon 1st Fanmeeting in Hongkong	Ohm, Nanon	Rotunda 2, 3/F, Kitec	
2023	OhmNanon 1st FanMeeting in Japan	Ohm, Nanon	Harmony Hall Zama	
2023	Love Out Loud (LOL) Fan Fest 2023: LOVOLUTION	With the cast of Our Skyy 2 (First, Khaotung, Joong, Dunk, Jimmy, Sea, Phuwin, Pond, Force, Book, Ohm, Nanon, Earth, Mix, Gemini, Fourth)	Royal Paragon Hall, 5F, Siam Paragon	
2024	Nanon born to เบียว Concert	Nanon	Thunder Dome Muangthong Thani	

== Discography ==
=== Studio albums ===
Title	Details
The Secrets of The Universe	Release date: 3 November 2023; Label: Riser Music; Formats: CD, digital download, streaming
My Girl Side A	Release date: 9 February 2025; Formats: digital download, streaming
My Girl Side B	Release date: 25 February 2025; Formats: digital download, streaming
SEVEN	Release date: 7 November 2025; Formats: CD, digital download, streaming

=== Singles ===
==== As lead artist ====
Year	Title	Ref.
2018	"YOUniverse (จักรวาลเธอ)"; YOUniverse (Jak Gra Wan Thoe)	
2019	"YOUniverse (จักรวาลเธอ)" (Special Version); YOUniverse (Jak Gra Wan Thoe) - Special Version	
2020	"มองกี่ทีก็น่ารัก (Cute Cute)"; Mong Kee Thee Kor Na Rak	
2021	"จักรวาลที่ฉันต้องการมีแค่เธอ (My Universe is You)"; Jak Gra Wan Tee Chan Tong Gan Mee Kae Thoe	

==== As featured artist ====
Year	Title	Artist	Ref.
2022	"Bad Boy"	SDthaitay	
2026	"ความคิดถึงที่ไม่จำเป็น (Friend Zone)"	Krist Perawat	

==== Collaborations ====
Year	Title	Notes	Ref.
2016	"พ่อจะอยู่ในใจเสมอ"; Pho Ja Yu Nai Jai Samoe		
2020	"เปลี่ยนคะแนนเป็นแฟนได้ไหม (Love Score)" (with SIZZY); Plain Ka Nan Pen Fan Dai Mai		
2022	"กราวกีฬาใหม่ (The Spirit of Sport)" (with Ohm and Ada)	Special Olympics Thailand	
2025	"จองตั๋วแล้วจองตัวเธอด้วยได้ปะ (Love Ticket)" (with Tay, Gemini, Fourth)	SF Super Friends	

===== Director credits =====
Year	Title	Artist	Ref.
2026	"ถูกที่ผิดเวลา (Wrong Time)"	Krist Perawat	
2026	"Butterflies"	Krist Perawat ft. Pup Potato	
2026	"ครบรอบไปด้วยกัน (Counting Till I Die)"	Krist Perawat	

==== Soundtrack appearances ====
Year	Title	Album	Ref.
2017	"กว่าจะรู้ใจตัวเอง"; Gwa Ja Roo Jai Tua Eng	Senior Secret Love: My Lil Boy 2 OST	
2021	"แค่เพื่อนมั้ง (Just Friend?)"; Kae Peuan Mang	Bad Buddy OST	
2022	"เพลงที่เพิ่งเขียนจบ (Our Song)"; Pleng Tee Peung Khean Jhob	Bad Buddy OST	
2023	"สิ่งมหัศจรรย์ที่ไม่มีรูปแบบ (Unidentified Wonder)"	UMG (Unidentified Mysterious Girlfriend) OST	
2025	"Say Yes"	Ossan’s Love Thailand OST	
2025	"ฉันก็ยังชอบมองท้องฟ้าอยู่ดี (Stratocumulus)"	I Love 'A Lot Of' You OST	

== Awards and nominations ==
Key
†	Indicates non-competitive categories

Year	Award	Category	Nominated work	Result	Ref.
2016	Jewel of Thailand Award	Outstanding Entertainment Person †	—N/a	Won	
2017	World Top Award	Person of the Year †	—N/a	Won	
2017	Maya Awards	Male Rising Star	Senior Secret Love	Nominated	
2017	Rattanakosin Active Citizen Award	Role Model Artists & Actors †	—N/a	Won	
2018	Buddha-anusorn Award	Role Model of Buddhism Preservation †	—N/a	Won	
2018	Golden Scales Award	Outstanding Public Welfare Person of The Year †	—N/a	Won	
2019	24th Asian Television Awards	Best Actor in a Leading Role	The Gifted	Nominated	
2019	Thailand Master Youth	Artists, Performers, Singers & Entertainers †	—N/a	Won	
2021	1st Siam Series Awards	Most Popular Actor	The Gifted: Graduation	Won	
2021	Asian Academy Creative Awards	Best Actor in a Leading Role (Thailand)	The Gifted: Graduation	Won	
2021	26th Asian Television Awards	Best Actor in a Leading Role	The Gifted: Graduation	Nominated	
2021	Kazz Awards	Attractive Young Man of the Year	—N/a	Nominated	
2021	PCA 2021	Best Thai Actor	Bad Buddy Series	Won	
2022	Maya Awards	Song of the Year	Just Friend? (Bad Buddy OST)	Nominated	
2022	Kazz Awards	Attractive Young Man of the Year	Bad Buddy Series	Won	
2022	Kazz Awards	Best Scene with Pawat Chittsawangdee	Bad Buddy Series	Won	
2022	Kazz Awards	Best Actor	Bad Buddy Series	Won	
2022	Kazz Awards	Best Couple with Pawat Chittsawangdee	Bad Buddy Series	Won	
2022	27th Asian Television Awards	Best Theme Song	Just Friend? (Bad Buddy OST)	Won	
2023	Japan Expo Thailand Award 2023	Japan Expo Actor Award	—N/a	Won	
2023	Kazz Awards 2023	Popular Male Teenage Award	—N/a	Won	
2023	Eh? Awards by TK Park	From Eh? To Growth	—N/a	Won	
2023	Howe Awards 2023	Howe Shining Male Award 2023	—N/a	Won	
2025	Weibo Culture Exchange Night 2025	Most Outstanding Stage Performer	—N/a	Won	
