= Sex Phone and the Girl Next Door =

- Directed by: Heyman Cheatamee Chalermpol Bunnag
- Written by: Nahornsah Suntornphol
- Produced by: Pattira Palatwatvichai Chaiyong Kosolpothisap Heyman Cheatamee
- Starring: Kawee Tanjararak (Beam D2B) Paula Taylor Anan Boonnak Cheathavuth Watcharakhun Somchai Samipak Panyapol Dejsong Orarik Jaruwat
- Cinematography: Ruangwit Ramsut
- Edited by: Suttiphorn Thaptim
- Music by: Alphabet Scale
- Distributed by: RS Film & Distribution
- Release date: June 6, 2003
- Running time: 115 minutes
- Language: Thai
- Box office: 26 million baht

Sex Phone and the Girl Next Door, known in Thai as Sex Phone / คลื่นเหงา / สาวข้างบ้าน ('sex phone / lonely wave / girl next door') is the second film directed by Heyman Cheatamee, following Body Jumper, with Chalermpol Bunnag as co-director. The film stars Kawee Tanjararak and Paula Taylor and was released on June 6, 2003. Despite receiving positive reviews, the film only grossed 26 million baht due to limited theater screenings.

== Plot summary ==
The film tells the story of Due (Kawee Tanjararak), a mild-mannered radio DJ who lives with his grandfather (Somchai Samipak), and Jay (Paula Taylor), a confident mixed-race woman living with her best friend. The two are neighbors who have never gotten along. However, when Jay’s friend Emma (Orarik Jaruwat) gives Jay’s phone number to a radio station called The Lonely Wave, hosted by DJ Man (Anan Boonnak), where Due works as an assistant, misunderstandings arise.

One night, when Due is forced to host the show, he calls Jay’s house, leading to a mix-up where Jay mistakes him for a "sex phone" operator. After that night, Jay becomes an overnight sensation. She later calls into the show to confront Due on New Year’s Eve, but the two eventually become close friends—unaware that they are actually the neighbors who dislike each other.

== Cast ==
- Kawee Tanjararak (Beam D2B) as Due
- Paula Taylor as Jay
- Anan Boonnak as DJ Man
- Cheathavuth Watcharakhun as Tao
- Somchai Samipak as Grandfather
- Arun Chanwong as Grandma Taeng
- Panyapol Dejsong as Ray
- Orarik Jaruwat as Emma

== Awards ==
Sex Phone and the Girl Next Door won the "Outstanding Media Award in Film Category for 2003" from the Catholic Media Council of Thailand on December 18, 2003.

== Soundtrack ==
- When I Fall in Love – Matthew Deane
- Yak Hai Roo Wa Rak Ter – Joni Anwar
- Glap Ma Dai Mai – Beam D2B
- When I Fall in Love – Sandra Mavro
- When I Fall in Love (Orchestra Version)
- Duay Ai Rak – Beam D2B
- Baby – DJ "B"
- Sexphone (Theme)
- When I Fall in Love (Instrumental)
- Glap Ma Dai Mai (Instrumental)
