= Assumption College Samutprakarn =

Private Catholic school in Thailand

- โรงเรียนอัสสัมชัญสมุทรปราการ (Thai)
- “ Your Child’s Success and Happiness is ACSP’s Goal ”

Location
- 419/1389 Theparak Road; Mueang Samut Prakan; Samut Prakan 10270; Thailand; 13.628889°N 100.601944°E

Information
- Type: Selective all-boys Roman Catholic independent school
- Motto: Labor omnia vincit (Latin); Work conquers all
- Religious affiliations: Roman Catholic (Gabrielite Brothers)
- Established: 17 May 1979; 47 years ago
- Founder: Montfort Brothers of St. Gabriel
- Director: Bro. PhD. Pisutr Vapiso, f.s.g.
- Faculty: 234 (2015)
- Grades: 1-12
- Enrollment: ≈4,410 (2015)
- Language: Languages taught in the school: (Thailand) Thai (United States) (United Kingdom) English (China) Mandarin Chinese
- Classrooms: 101 (2021)
- Colors: Red and white
- Website: www.acsp.ac.th

Assumption College Samutprakarn (Thai: โรงเรียนอัสสัมชัญสมุทรปราการ) (formerly Assumption College Samrong Thai: โรงเรียนอัสสัมชัญสำโรง) is a private Catholic school in Samut Prakan Province, Thailand. The school was founded and run by the Brothers of St. Gabriel since 1979 as the thirteenth educational institution of the congregation. The school provides education to students from grade 1 through 12.

== History ==
Assumption College Samrong was established when Vichai Maleenont, the founder of BEC World who was the director of Theparak Estate Co., Ltd. at the time, donated 23,708 sqm. and 3,000,000 Thai Baht in cash to the Brothers of St. Gabriel for the purpose of establish Assumption College Samrong which was named after the district it was located at the time.

The school opened on 17 May 1979. In its first academic year, it offered classes from grade 1 through 6, and had 8 classrooms, 15 teachers and 371 students. It was supervised by Bro. Viriya Chandavarodom.

On 18 August 1990, the Ministry of the Interior changed the district of administration. This made the school no longer located in Samrong district. After that, the school changed its name to Assumption College Samutprakarn on May 1, 2003.

Assumption College Samutprakarn received the Royal Award Granted Secondary School in academic year 2007 and the Royal Award Granted Primary School in academic year 2012 awarded by the Office of the Basic Education Commission.

Assumption College Samutprakarn started its English program in 2006. It firstly offered classes only in grade 1, 4 and 7. The classes grew every year and finally filled all of the 12 levels in 2012.

== Buildings ==
=== Assumption building ===
Assumption building is the first building built in 1978. It was finished in half of the full plan at the time they opened in 1979 for its first academic semester. It was blessed by Cardinal Michael Michai Kitbunchu (then a regular Archbishop, pre-elevation to the cardinalate) and inaugurated by Sanya Dharmasakti, president of the Privy Council on 25 August 1979. The building was completed as planned in 1981.

=== Single storey-building ===
Single storey-building (Thai: อาคารชั้นเดียว) built in 1982. It was constructed with 6 classrooms. It was demolished in 2008 to make way for the new building.

=== St. Gabriel building ===
St. Gabriel building built in 1984 as a 5 storey-building. At the time, it consists of 7 classrooms on each floor. It was blessed and inaugurated on 6 July 1985. It was used by the students from grade 1 through 3 until the new building was finished in 2008. Later on, It was used by the school's English Program as an intensive classroom.

=== Montfort building ===
Monfort building built in 1988. It consists of 7 stories including 7 classrooms on each floor. Used by grade 5 through 9 of the MLP program.

=== Administrative building ===
Administrative building was built simultaneously with Montfort building in 1988. It contains general offices of the school. The construction was completed in 1990. Both Administrative and Montfort building was blessed by Cardinal Michael Michai Kitbunchu and inaugurated by Princess Soamsawali, the senior consort and former wife of King Maha Vajiralongkorn.

=== Louis Marie building ===
Louis Marie building is a 4 storey-building completed in 1999. Its first and second floor used as a canteen. The third and fourth floor used as convention hall until 2006 when the third floor was remodelled for activities used and laboratories.

=== Louis Chanel building ===
Louis Chanel building is a 6 storey-building completed in 2007. It used for students from grade 1 through 3 who moved from St. Gabriel building and grade 4 from Montfort building. The building was blessed by Cardinal Michael Michai Kitbunchu and inaugurated by Princess Maha Chakri Sirindhorn.

=== Sport Center ===
Sport Center is a semi indoor arena used for sport activities. It consists of 2 basketball courts and a futsal field with grandstands.

=== Sakdanusorn building ===
Sakdanusorn building is a sport activities building completed in 2015. The building consists of 2 swimming pools, a fitness centre and physical education facilities. The building named after its former director, Bro. Sakda Kitcharoen, who died in 2010. Both swimming pools and fitness centre are open for public use after school time.

=== Saint Louis Arena ===
Saint Louis Arena is a multipurpose yard and can be used as a football field.

== School Directors ==
Years in office	Name
1979-1986	Bro. Viriya Chandavarodom (Founder)
1979-1983	Bro. Bancha Saenghiran (Manager)
1983-1987	Bro. Pratheep Martin Komolmas (Manager)
1986–1998	Bro. Surasit Sukchai
1998-2000	Bro. Arun Metthaseth
2000–2001	Bro. Surasit Sukchai (2)
2001–2002	Bro. Surakit Srisarankulwong
2002-2007	Bro. Sakda Kitcharoen
2007-2012	Bro. Vinai Viriyavidhayavongs
2012–2018	Bro. Thaksabutr Kraiprasit (Bro.Fern)
2018–2022	Bro. PhD. Pisutr Vapiso and Bro. Anusak Nitipatraphorn
2022–2024	Bro. Manit Sakonthawat and Bro. Natthon Supol
2025–Present	Bro. Panuwat Mueanthap and Bro. Kornkavee Yindeevet

== Notable alumni ==
Entertainment

- Apichet Kittikorncharoen (Big D2B) - Singer
- Kawee Tanjararak (Beam) - Singer of D2B
- Chotiwuth Boonyasith (Nut) - Guitarist of Singular
- Nannaphas Loetnamchoetsakun - Netflix actress
- Poon Sutarom (Pun) - GMMTV actor

Sport

- Sarach Yooyen - football player of Thailand national football team

== See also ==
- Brothers of St. Gabriel
