= Omen (2003 film) =

Sanghorn (Omen)
- Thai movie poster
- Directed by: Thammarak Kamuttmanoch
- Written by: The Pang Brothers
- Produced by: Rashane Limtrakul; Jantima Liawsirikun; Pisut Praesangeam
- Starring: Kawee Tanjararak; Panrawat Kittikorncharoen; Worrawech Danuwong
- Cinematography: Decha Srimantra
- Edited by: The Pang Brothers
- Distributed by: RS Film
- Release date: April 4, 2003
- Running time: 87 minutes
- Country: Thailand
- Language: Thai

Sung horn (Thai: สังหรณ์ English title: Omen) is a 2003 Thai suspense film. It was written by the Pang Brothers and starred Kawee Tanjararak (Beam), Panrawat Kittikorncharoen (Big) and Worrawech Danuwong (Dan) – all members of a popular Thai boyband at the time, D2B.

== Plot ==
Strange things start happening when separate twists of fate bring each of three friends, Big, Dan and Beam, into contact with three strangers – an old woman who tells prophecies, a little girl who sells garlands on the street and a young woman named Aom. What none of them realizes is that not only is there a connection between the three females, but also between the guys themselves and their destinies. But it starts to become clear that one of them is fated to die.

== Cast ==
- Kawee Tanjararak as Beam
- Panrawat Kittikorncharoen as Big
- Worrawech Danuwong as Dan
- Supatchaya Reunreung as Aom

== Trivia ==
- The three friends' character names are the nicknames they use in real life.
- After the movie was released, Panrawat Kittikorncharoen (Big) was involved in a traffic accident in which his car overturned in a polluted khlong in Bangkok. A large amount of bacteria entered his body and he was in a coma. He made a recovery, but suffered brain damage. He eventually died on December 9, 2007, due to complications.
- Dan and Beam have continued in music as a duo but later on the two separated. Dan joined in Sony BMG and Beam stayed in RS Public Company Limited.
