= Manoon Leechawengwong =

- Born: August 26, 1949 (age 77); Bangkok, Thailand
- Occupation: Physician

Manoon Leechawengwong (born 26 August 1949) is a Thai physician who is the chairman of the "Don't Drive Drowsy" Fund under the patronage of Princess Galyani Vadhana for the Ramathibodi Foundation. He is also the chairman of the Drug-Resistant Tuberculosis Research Fund, also under the patronage of Princess Galyani Vadhana, for the Siriraj Foundation.

== History ==
Manoon Leechawengwong was born on August 26, 1949 to a poor family of Thai Chinese descent in Bangkok. He graduated from Saint Gabriel's College at the secondary level before entering Mahidol University to study medical science. He then continued his studies at the Faculty of Medicine, Ramathibodi Hospital and graduated in 1972. He then went to the United States to further his education in internal medicine, respiratory diseases, and critical care at the Mount Sinai School of Medicine in New York City, where he was later offered a position as an Assistant Clinical Professor in 1980.

Manoon returned to Thailand in 1991 and began working as a resident physician at Vichaiyut Hospital, where he currently holds the position of head of the ICU specializing in respiratory diseases, critical care, and geriatric medicine.

Manoon became famous as the head of the medical team that treated Big D2B, or Panrawat Kittikorncharoen, a popular teen singer who was in a car accident in a ditch along outbound Srinagarindra Road in 2003. Manoon treated a brain abscess with a new antifungal drug named voriconazole from Australia.

Manoon served as the president of the AIDS Society of Thailand for two terms, from 2007 to 2011. He is currently a consultant for the AIDS Society of Thailand and has been the president of the Medical Mycology Association of Thailand since 2015.

Manoon is the chairman of the Drug-Resistant Tuberculosis Research Fund under the patronage of Princess Galyani Vadhana, the Princess of Naradhiwas of the Siriraj Foundation. Since 2001, the fund has provided free sputum tests to culture tuberculosis and test for drug sensitivity for patients from government hospitals, to ensure they receive correct medication. He has also campaigned to reduce the spread of respiratory diseases by wearing face masks and washing hands, and has initiated a project to prevent tuberculosis transmission from humans to elephants in collaboration with veterinarians.

Manoon is the chairman of the Don't Drive While Drowsy Fund under the patronage of Princess Galyani Vadhana, the Princess of Naradhiwas of the Ramathibodi Foundation, which has campaigned against drowsy driving since 2004. In 2012, he started the "Thai Children Love Their Brains" project, which encourages Thai children to get enough sleep. He also began a campaign to quickly extinguish incense sticks after lighting them to reduce global warming and the risk of cancer.
