= Zhou Hong =

Zhou Hong may refer to:

- Zhou Hong (volleyball) (born 1966), Chinese volleyball player
- Jessie Zhou (born 1987), Chinese actress
