= Mo Jing (disambiguation) =

Mo Jing or Mozi is the Mohist canon.

Mo Jing may also refer to:

- That Demon Within, a 2014 Hong Kong film by Dante Lam
- The Mirror (2015 film), Chinese-South Korean film
