= Ruk Jung =

2006 Thai romantic comedy film

Ruk Jung (The Memory)
- Theatrical release poster
- Directed by: Haeman Chatemee
- Written by: Nhahansa Soonthornpoj; Kongkiat Komesiri
- Produced by: Jantima Liawsirikun; Monthon Arayangkoon; Pattira Palawatvichai
- Starring: Paula Taylor; Duangrudee Boonbumroong; Somphong Kunapratom; Khwannapa Reuangsri
- Cinematography: Ruengwit Ramasoota
- Edited by: Suthiporn Taptim
- Music by: Banana Boat
- Distributed by: RS Film
- Release date: 1 June 2006
- Running time: 105 minutes
- Country: Thailand
- Language: Thai

The Memory or Ruk Jung (Thai: รักจัง; RTGS: Rak Chang; lit. 'So Much Love') is a 2006 Thai romantic comedy film directed by Haeman Chatemee and starring Paula Taylor.

== Plot ==
Superstar singer Film is involved in a car accident in the rural, remote mountain forests of northern Thailand. He is rescued by some hill tribe people, but because he has amnesia, he can't remember who he is. A paparazza named Jaa has followed Film. Before the accident, Film and Jaa were enemies, but now he thinks that she is someone he might have loved in his past life brought back to him by the legendary fireflies.

== Cast ==
- Paula Taylor as Jaa
- Duangrudee Boonbumroong as Aaloo
- Somphong Kunapratom as Lawsoo
- Khwannapa Reuangsri as Aalaa

== Awards ==
- 2007 Thailand National Film Association Awards – Best Cinematography
