= Bangkok Traffic (Love) Story =

2009 Thai romantic comedy film

- Theatrical poster
- Directed by: Adisorn Tresirikasem
- Written by: Benjamaporn Srabua; Nawapol Thamrongrattanarit; Adisorn Tresirikasem
- Produced by: Jira Maligool; Chenchonnee Soonthornsarntool; Suwimol Taechasupinun; Vanridee Pongsittisak
- Starring: Cris Horwang; Theeradej Wongpuapan; Ungsumalynn Sirapatsakmetha
- Cinematography: Somboon Piriyapakdeekul; Jira Maligool
- Edited by: Vichapat Gojew; Thammarat Sumetsupachok; Panayu Khunwallee
- Music by: Instinct
- Distributed by: GMM Tai Hub
- Release date: 15 October 2009 (Thailand)
- Country: Thailand
- Language: Thai
- Box office: >140 million baht

Bangkok Traffic (Love) Story (Thai: รถไฟฟ้า มาหานะเธอ, RTGS: Rot Fai Fa Ma Ha Na Thoe) (Note: The Thai name of the film is a pun on the Thai name of the MRT: รถไฟฟ้ามหานคร; RTGS: Rot Fai Fa Maha Nakhon)), is a Thai romantic comedy film released by GTH on 15 October 2009. It was directed by Adisorn Tresirikasem and written by Nawapol Thamrongrattanarit. The film tells the story of Mei Li (Cris Horwang), a thirty-year-old woman feeling desperate about being last among her friends to marry, and her relationship with Loong (Theeradej Wongpuapan), an engineer working on the BTS Skytrain system. The skytrain, which celebrated its tenth anniversary the same year and lends its name to the film's Thai and English titles, is prominently featured throughout the story.

The film was criticized for its loose plot, but critics felt that young middle-class female Bangkokians could identify with the contemporary setting. The film was financially successful, earning 57 million baht on its opening weekend and over 140 million baht after four weeks.

== Plot ==
Thirty-year-old Mei Li (Cris Horwang) has never had a boyfriend. She gets drunk on her best friend Ped's (Panisara Pimpru) wedding night, upset that she is the only single girl left in her friend group. Driving home intoxicated, she crashes her car but is aided by an attractive man. When she reaches home, her family scolds her and bans her from driving, forcing her to commute by public transport.

The next night, Mei Li accidentally catches their teenage maid having sex with her boyfriend on their rooftop. Mei Li's father demands to see the boy's guardian, who turns out to be the man who helped Mei Li the previous night. The man, Loong (Theeradej Wongpuapan), is a tenant at the guest house the boy caretakes. On another night, Mei Li encounters Loong on the BTS Skytrain, where she accidentally breaks his sunglasses. She buys Loong a new pair of sunglasses and writes her phone number on the box, hoping he will call her. After waiting in vain, Mei Li and her neighbor Plern (Ungsumalynn Sirapatsakmetha) meet Loong at the video rental shop he frequents, and the flirtatious Plern cleverly obtains Loong's phone number and learns that he is a night shift engineer for the BTS Skytrain. However, Plern refuses to give Loong's number to Mei Li and instead becomes a cashier at the video rental store. In retaliation, Mei Li summons Plern's three boyfriends to the store, causing a ruckus that Loong gets caught in, resulting in the smashing of his laptop.

Feeling responsible, Mei Li takes Loong's laptop to Ped's husband, but he can't fix it. Mei Li goes to return it at the BTS office. When Loong finishes work, he finds Mei Li, and they ride the BTS to get home. Loong decides to throw away the laptop and its bag. Mei Li picks the bag up out of the garbage bin and takes it home. There are many things inside, including film negatives. Mei Li has the film printed, and finds there are pictures of Loong with Kob Kavita (Taksaorn Paksukcharern), an actress in "Saint's Tear", a popular television series. The photo printing shop owner posts the pictures on the internet, as they are of a famous actress.

Mei Li meets Loong again on a skytrain and tells him that the pictures might have been published because of her, but Loong doesn't mind. Loong tells her that Kob is his ex-girlfriend, and they broke up because their schedules didn't match. When the skytrain arrives at Ekkamai Station, Mei Li suggests that they watch the stars at the Bangkok Planetarium and see an exhibition about a comet that will be appearing soon. Mei Li asks Loong to watch the comet with her in Bangkok. Later, before the Songkran holidays, Loong asks Mei Li to come celebrate by throwing water.

During the Songkran festival, Plern joins them. Mei Li does not enjoy the festivities because of her. Mei Li knows Loong's address, which is a guesthouse next to Chao Phraya River. Mei Li changes her clothes and goes to see Loong, and finds him asleep. Mei Li falls asleep next to him. After she wakes up, Loong asks her to travel around Bangkok. Loong asks Mei Li to come to family day at the BTS, as he can take her into the depot. Loong takes pictures, but Mei Li damages the camera.

On the family day visit, Mei Li finds out that Loong is leaving in two days to spend two years studying in Germany. They say goodbye on the Taksin Bridge. Loong sends Mei Li a box when he arrives in Germany. Inside is the mirror from her car from when they first met, the damaged sunglasses, the broken laptop, Bangkok Planetarium tickets, and the damaged camera, with the memory card still inside. Mei Li looks at the pictures. She rushes to Suvarnabhumi Airport to try to stop Loong, but she is too late. On that day, the comet orbits the Earth. Loong watches the comet from on board his plane, while Mei Li watches it as well.

Two years later, while going to work one evening, Mei Li accidentally meets Loong on a BTS Skytrain. Loong works a day shift and has been back in Thailand for a few months. Both get off the Skytrain at Siam Station, which is the interchange station between the Sukhumvit Line and the Silom Line. Mei Li goes downstairs to change to a different line and doesn't turn back to look at Loong. Mei Li gets on her train, but the electricity goes out. Passengers call their friends or family to say the train has stopped. Mei Li's phone rings; it is Loong. He asks Mei Li to celebrate Songkran again. Mei Li replies that she is free for the holidays. When electricity comes back on, Loong is on the same Skytrain, standing next to Mei Li. He tells Mei Li that she has his number now and to save it.

== Production ==
Bangkok Traffic (Love) Story was sponsored by the BTS, and the movie includes many scenes depicting maintenance work on the system and its infrastructure. The film was promoted as part of BTS's tenth anniversary celebrations. The film's Thai name, Rod fai fah.. Ma Ha Na Ther, translates as "Skytrain, coming to meet you" and is a word play on Rot Fai Fa Maha Nakhon (รถไฟฟ้ามหานคร), which is the Thai name of the MRT underground system. The English title is abbreviated BTS to coincide with that of the skytrain system.

The film was filmed in many places in Bangkok, including Wat Arun, Yaowarat, Ananta Samakhom Throne Hall, Bangkok Planetarium, Chan Road.

Loong's guesthouse filmed at Loy La Long Hotel, a guesthouse in the Talat Noi area along the Chao Phraya River that can see the pagoda of Chee Chin Khor Temple in Khlong San side clearly.

== Reception ==
=== Critical response ===
Critics mostly noted how Bangkok Traffic (Love) Story, despite its flaws, appropriately served and satisfied its target audience of Bangkok's young female adults. In Manager Daily, Aphinan Bunrueangphanao noted the film's chick flick elements, and how the casting of Theeradej as the male lead helped boost the film's appeal. He noted that Cris skillfully represented the humorously exaggerated single urban female in her lead role, but criticized the film for its weak and loose plot. Nantakwang Sirasoontorn observed in Kom Chad Luek that the film's most distinct theme was that of the female fantasy of meeting the perfect man. He noted that images of contemporary Bangkok life and GTH's carefully planned marketing campaigns helped propel the film to success. He commended Cris's acting and criticized the weak plot.

=== Box office ===
Bangkok Traffic (Love)Story was a box office hit upon release, earning 15.1 million baht on its opening day, surpassing Phobia 2's prior annual record of 14.9 million, and 57 million baht during the opening weekend. At four weeks, the film totalled over 140 million baht in theatrical earnings, surpassing Fan Chan's prior GTH record of 137 million, and becoming by far the highest-grossing film of 2009.

== Awards ==
Award	Category	Result
People's Choice Awards 2009	Best Picture	Won
People's Choice Awards 2009	Best Actor (Theeradej Wongpuapan)	Won
People's Choice Awards 2009	Best Actress (Cris Horwang)	Won
7th Kom Chad Luek Awards	Best Picture	Nominated
7th Kom Chad Luek Awards	Best Director	Nominated
7th Kom Chad Luek Awards	Best Actress (Cris Horwang)	Won
Top Awards 2009	Best Picture	Won
Top Awards 2009	Best Director	Won
Top Awards 2009	Best Actress (Cris Horwang)	Nominated
Top Awards 2009	Best Actor (Theeradej Wongpuapan)	Won
Top Awards 2009	Favourite Breakout Movie Actress (Ungsumalynn Sirapatsakmetha)	Won
7th Starpics Thai Film Awards	Best Picture	Won
7th Starpics Thai Film Awards	Best Actress (Cris Horwang)	Won
3rd Chalerm Thai Awards	Best Picture of the Year	Nominated
3rd Chalerm Thai Awards	Best Actor of the Year (Theeradej Wongpuapan)	Nominated
3rd Chalerm Thai Awards	Best Actress of the Year (Cris Horwang)	Won
18th Bangkok Critics Assembly Awards	Best Director	Nominated
18th Bangkok Critics Assembly Awards	Best Actress (Cris Horwang)	Won
18th Bangkok Critics Assembly Awards	Best Film Directing	Nominated
18th Bangkok Critics Assembly Awards	Best Film Editing	Nominated
18th Bangkok Critics Assembly Awards	Best Art Direction	Nominated
18th Bangkok Critics Assembly Awards	The Highest-Grossing Film	Won
19th Thai National Film Awards	Best Actress (Cris Horwang)	Won
19th Thai National Film Awards	Best Costume Design	Nominated
19th Thai National Film Awards	Best Makeup	Nominated
3rd Nine Entertain Awards	Best Picture of the Year	Nominated
3rd Nine Entertain Awards	Best Actress (Cris Horwang)	Nominated
7th Hamburger Awards	Best Picture	Nominated
7th Hamburger Awards	Best Director	Nominated
7th Hamburger Awards	Best Actress (Cris Horwang)	Won
7th Hamburger Awards	Best Supporting Actress (Ungsumalynn Sirapatsakmetha)	Nominated
7th Hamburger Awards	Favourite Scene-Stealing Actor (Charlie Trairat)	Nominated
7th Hamburger Awards	Favourite Scene-Stealing Actor (Sunny Suwanmethanont)	Nominated
7th Hamburger Awards	Best Original Song	Nominated
