= Chamloei Rak =

1960 novel by Chuwong Chayachinda

Chamloei Rak (Thai: จำเลยรัก) is a 1960 novel by Chuwong Chayachinda which has been adapted for two movies and five television series.

== Plot ==
This is the story of Soraya, whose life changed when she was kidnapped by Harit Rangsiman. Harit mistook her for her cousin, who had caused the death of his brother. Humiliated and forced to work, Soraya befriends a deaf and mute man who is also a victim of Harit's cruelty. When Harit realises his mistake, he releases Soraya, but only to spy on her cousin, which ultimately leads to her downfall.

Chamloei Rak has been adapted for two movies and five television series.

- 1963 Film - Starring Mitr Chaibancha as Harit and Pisamai Wilaisak as Soorya
- 1974 TV series - Starring Sa-ard Piampongsarn as Harit
- 1978 Film - Starring Piroj Sangwoributh as Harit and Nawarath Yuktanan as Soorya
- 1980 TV series - Starring Witoon Karuna as Harit and Panadda Komaratat as Soorya
- 1988 TV series - Starring Likhit Akemongkol as Harit and Sawitree Sameepuk Soorya
- 1997-98 TV series - Starring John Rattanaveroj as Harit and Kulsatree Siripongpreeda as Soorya
- 2008 TV series - Starring Atichart Chumnanont as Harit and Taksaorn Paksukcharern as Soorya
