= 999-9999 =

- The Thai movie poster.
- Directed by: Peter Manus
- Screenplay by: Peter Manus; Nuttiya Sirakornwilai
- Story by: Worrawit Kattiyayothin; Khamrob Wonggot; Peter Manus; Nuttiya Sirakornwilai
- Produced by: Prachya Pinkaew
- Starring: Hugo Chakrabongse; Sririta Jensen; Paula Taylor
- Cinematography: Witcha Intranoi
- Edited by: Dusanee Puinongpho
- Music by: Wild At Heart
- Distributed by: Sahamongkol Film International
- Release date: 20 September 2002
- Running time: 103 minutes
- Country: Thailand
- Language: Thai

999-9999 (Thai: ต่อ - ติด - ตาย) is a 2002 Thai horror film directed by Peter Manus and starring Hugo Chakrabongse and Sririta Jensen. The story is about the deadly consequences of receiving a telephone call from the number 999-9999.

== Plot ==
Sun (Hugo Chakrabongse) is a student in an international school in Phuket. Not academically inclined, he considers himself as "his own man" who doesn't believe in love and is the head of a clique of pranksters consisting of the attractive but selfish Meena (Paula Taylor), geeky Rajit (Thepparit Raiwin), smart but timid Wawa (Norajan Sangigern), and fun-loving Chi (Titinun Keatanakon). The overweight Moo Priew (Ramit Romon) aspires to join Sun's clique, but is rejected every time.

One day, Sun and his friends notice a beautiful and mysterious new transfer student nicknamed Rainbow (Sririta Jensen). She was transferred from a high school in Chiang Mai where a student had been impaled on the school's flagpole. When asked how it happened, Rainbow says it involved a demon call from the phone number 999-9999. If one calls it after midnight and says a wish, the wish shall be granted later, but as a consequence, death will come to the caller. None of the clique members believe this, and Chi calls it after midnight in front of the others and wishes for a Ferrari. He wakes up the next morning receiving exactly what he wished for by luck.

Chi soon dies from a combination of a scorpion attack and a malfunctioning car wash machine which slashes his throat with a spinning blade. The rest of the friends still don't believe Rainbow's story and even make wishes themselves, prioritizing only the first part of the deal. Meena wishes to be a Channel V Thailand VJ, only to be killed by a hanging noose at a party afterwards.

Soon after Meena's death, Sun begins to investigate about the deadly call and spends more time with Rainbow. However, the other members of his clique continue to make wishes. Rajit wishes not to be a geek anymore and is burned by a fire. Moo Priew wants to lose weight, only to die by falling out of a window with his organs pulled out (thus making him thinner). Wawa wishes to be an astronaut student, and sharp gears split her head in two.

Sun calls the number, wishing for something he believes couldn't be granted: love. Rainbow then kisses him, and he realizes that his wish was granted. To avoid the possibility of her being killed with him, Sun locks Rainbow in the tower where his clique usually hung out.

While watching Rainbow via cameras, Sun realizes that Rainbow is the one causing the deaths of his friends by introducing them to the number, making her a devil's apprentice. When he returns to the tower, Rainbow vanishes, and the number calls Sun, telling him he's going to die. A heavy box falls from the top of the tower, but Sun manages to avoid it, only to fall on a pipe which pierces through his chest, killing him. A flashback set in Rainbow's former school shows Rainbow telling the girls there about the number, hence causing the deaths there later on, including the girl who was impaled on a flagpole.

== Cast ==
- Chulachak Chakrabongse as Sun
- Sririta Jensen as Rainbow
- Paula Taylor as Meena
- Thepparit Raiwin as Chi
- Norajan Sangigern as Wawa
- Titinun Keatanakon as Rajit
- Ramit Romon as Moo Priew
- Pisut Praesangeam as Officer at station
- Janeen Lyons as Channel V Veejay

== Reception ==
Variety finds the film formulaic but has acceptable special effects and "okay" performance from the cast. Vegan Vorhees rated the film three out of five stars. The film was compared with Final Destination and described as an engaging film.
