= Split Second (TV series) =

- 爭分奪秒
- Genre: Crime thriller Action
- Written by: Wong Wai-keung
- Starring: Alex Fong; Kevin Cheng; Patrick Tam; Marco Ngai; Yoyo Mung; Moses Chan; Sririta Jensen; Chatchai Plengpanich
- Country of origin: Hong Kong
- Original language: Cantonese
- No. of episodes: 30

Production
- Producer: Marco Law
- Production locations: Hong Kong; Thailand
- Camera setup: Multi camera
- Production companies: TVB; TV3

Original release
- Network: TVB Jade
- Release: 4 October – 12 November 2004

Related
- War and Beauty; The Last Breakthrough

Split Second is a 2004 Hong Kong crime thriller television drama produced by TVB and Thailand's TV3, with Marco Law serving as the executive producer. It ran from October 4, 2004 to November 12, 2004, with the total of 30 episodes.

This show uses a format similar to the American series 24. Each one-hour episode represents one day in the show's timeline, and an on-screen digital clock appears in the show regularly to remind viewers the time in the storyline.

== Synopsis ==
This story is about the 30-day game of chasing between the Hong Kong police and the Hong Kong Triads, who are allegedly linked to the Thai mafia. The story starts on April 1, 2004 with an attack on the police commissioner, and ends on April 30, 2004, with the deaths of many good people.

== Characters ==
- Fung Chi Wai (ฝงจือเหว่ย) (Alex Fong (方中信)) — A Hong Kong Policeman tried to find evidence in order to arrest the group of triads in Hong Kong which is also linked with the Thai mafia.
- Wong Ka Fai (หวงเจียฮุย) (Kevin Cheng (鄭嘉穎)) — Chief Inspector of Hong Kong CIB, team A. Knowing himself has brain cancer and not much time left, he tried to find the mole inside the CIB, who is placed by the Hong Kong triads.
- Yeung Kai Tung (หยางฉี่ตง) (Patrick Tam (譚耀文)) — Originally an ordinary Hong Kong police constable (PC) but later became an undercover in the Hong Kong triads.
- Hau Man Wah (โหวเหวินหัว) (Marco Ngai (魏駿傑)) — The most trustable person in the Hong Kong triads by the most notable Thai mafia head, Cheng Kuan.
- Pang Wai (เผิงฮุ่ย) (Yoyo Mung (蒙嘉慧)) — A girl who help Fung Chi Wai a lot in collecting the evidence of the Hong Kong triads.

== Cast ==
- Alex Fong as Fung Chi Wai (馮志偉, ฝงจื้อเหว่ย)
- Kevin Cheng as Wong Ka Fai (Vincent) (黃嘉輝, หวงเจียฮุย)
- Patrick Tam as Yeung Kai Dong (Ah Dong) (楊啟東, หยางฉี่ตง)
- Marco Ngai as Hao Mun Wa (侯文華, โหวเหวินหัว)
- Yoyo Mung as Pang Wai (彭慧, เผิงฮุ่ย)
- Chatchai Plengpanich as Sam (แซม)
- Sririta Jensen as Rita (ริต้า)
- Claire Yiu as Zhu Wing Kei (朱詠琪, จูหย่งฉี)
- Johnson Lee (李思捷) as Gum Yu Loi/Hung Mao (金悅來/熊貓, จินเยี่ยไหล)
- Lau Kong (劉江) as Cheng Kwan/Lee Man Ho (鄭坤/李萬豪, เจิ้นคุน)
- Mark Kwok (郭耀明) as Hung Pui Kei (洪培基)
- Fiona Yuen as Lo Sau Ling (羅秀玲)
- Mandy Cho as Tang Wai Ting (鄧偉晴)
- Raymond Tsang (曾守明) as Ho Chiu Kuen (何超權)
- Eric Li (李天翔) as Yip Tin Sing (葉天成)
- Benz Hui as Lam Yau Wai (林有威)
- Lai Lok-yi as Kur Gin Fung (區健風)
- Eddy Ko as Wong Jung Yeung (王掁揚, หวังเจิ้นหยาง) (Wong Sir)
- Moses Chan as Luk Yiu Gwok (陸耀國, ลู่เย่ากั๋ว)
- Miki Yeung (楊愛瑾) as Fung Mei Yun (馮美茵)

== Music ==
Opening Theme
Instrumental

Insert Songs

- Heaven Knows by Rick Price
- Moon River
- A Part of Me
