= Video Clip =

- Thai theatrical poster
- Directed by: Pakphum Wonjinda
- Written by: Pakphum Wonjinda
- Starring: Ngamsiri Arsira-Lertsiri; Warot Pitakanonda; Nuttapong Tangkasam
- Distributed by: Sahamongkol Film International
- Release date: 26 July 2007
- Running time: 78 minutes
- Country: Thailand
- Language: Thai

Video Clip or VDO Clip (Thai: วิดีโอคลิป) is a 2007 Thai horror film directed by Pakphum Wonjinda.

== Plot ==
Mobile phones today come with a host of novel features to entertain their users. But a dark side hides amid their use. This film features a group of people obsessed with mobile phone video recording: Ken (Paopol Thephasdin) is a mobile phone repair man who has steals private video clips from his customers’ phones; Pub DJ Aud (Warot Pitakanonda) likes having fun with girls and records those adventures on his phone to share with others; and Gaeng (Nuttapong Tangkasam), the pub owner who creates a porn website featuring mobile phone video clips. However, none of the characters realise their mobile phone habit is to become a threat to their lives.

== Cast ==
- Ngamsiri Arsira-Lertsiri as Meena
- Warot Pitakanonda as Awt
- Nuttapong Tangkasam as Sia Gayng
- Paopol Thephasdin as Ken
- Sumonrat Wattanaselarat as Amy

== Reception ==
The film is said to address the topic of teenagers and "the dark side of growing up in Thailand”, as did earlier films by Wonjinda.
