= Paula Taylor =

Thai model

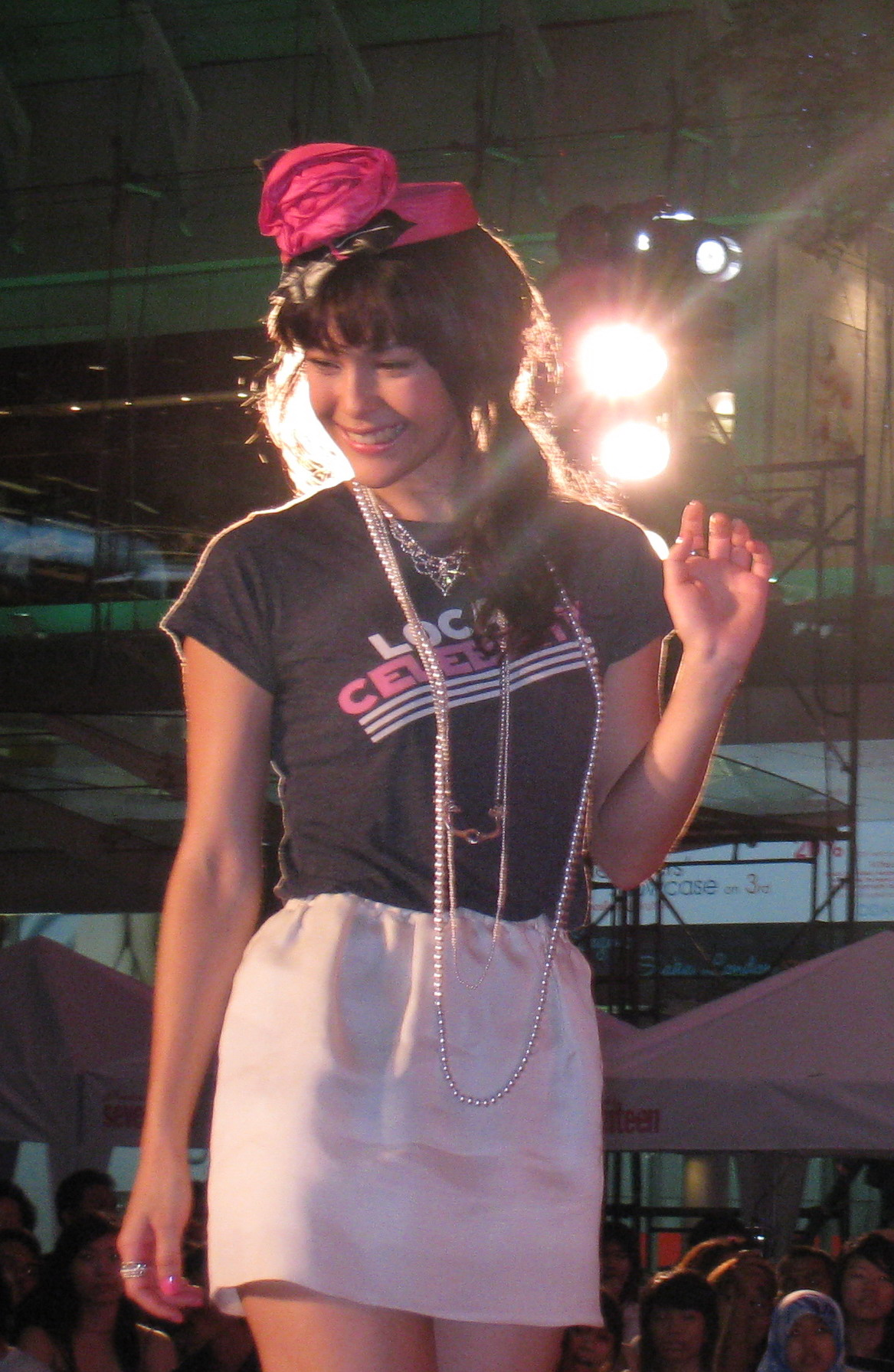
- Taylor at 6th anniversary of Seventeen Magazine
- Born: Punlapa Margaret Taylor; January 20, 1983 (age 43); Bangkok, Thailand
- Years active: 2000–present
- Known for: Jaa in Ruk Jung
- Television: The Amazing Race Asia 2
- Spouse(s): Edward Buttery (m. 2011; div. 2023)
- Children: 3, including Lyla, Luca, Luella

Punlapa Margaret Taylor (born January 20, 1983), also known as Paula Taylor (Thai: พอลล่า เทเลอร์) or Thai name Punlapa Supa-aksorn (Thai: พัลลภา ศุภอักษร; RTGS: Phanlapha Suppha-akson), is a Thai actress, model, and presenter of British descent.

== Personal life ==
Taylor was born in Chulalongkorn hospital, Bangkok, Thailand. Two weeks after she was born, the family moved to Australia. Her mother is of Thai Chinese descent and her father is of English descent. She grew up in Perth, Western Australia and at the age of 9, after her parents' divorce, moved to Brisbane, Queensland. Taylor got a bachelor's in Business Administration from Assumption University

== Career ==
While visiting her family in Thailand, she was asked if she would be interested in doing some modelling. She started her career in several commercials and small Thai movies before becoming a regular VJ for Channel V Thailand. Discovered by television producer Tanawat Wansom, she quickly rose to fame and became a sought-after television hostess and presenter. In 2006, she co-starred in the Thai romance comedy film The Memory.

=== The Amazing Race Asia 2 ===
Taylor also participated in The Amazing Race Asia 2 with her childhood friend Natasha Monks. At the 9th leg they came in last, but it was a non-elimination leg. In Leg 10, however, which was in Hungary, they came last for the second time, leading them to be the 6th eliminated pair. They finished 5th in the race.

On the Amazing Race Asia 3, she appeared alongside host Allan Wu as the local greeter at the Pit Stop of the first leg.

=== Present ===
Taylor made her Hollywood debut starring opposite William Hurt and Cary Elwes in the 2011 film Hellgate. Due to her exposure in the Amazing Race Asia, her face and name have become familiar in several Southeast Asian countries. In 2009 she landed the starring role in a film starring Filipino comedian Vic Sotto in Love On Line where she plays a version of herself. She was also a guest host on Eat Bulaga! in which Sotto is a regular. She appears on the Philippine TV Sunday variety show SOP. She currently resides in Hong Kong and London and is focusing on raising her children, but she still travels around Asia for commercials and television guest appearances.

After divorcing her husband, she brought her three children back to live in Thailand and took on acting work again in 10 years, starring the role of Stella, a Thai American single mom, in Taklee Genesis, the first Thai-Warner Bros. joint venture sci-fi film, directed by Chookiat Sakveerakul.

== Filmography ==
=== Movies ===
Year	Title	Role
2002	999-9999	Meena
2003	Sexphone & the Lonely Wave (Sexphone / คลื่นเหงา / สาวข้างบ้าน)	Jay
2006	The Memory (รักจัง)	Jaa
2006	The Magnificent Five (พระ เด็ก เสือ ไก่ วอก)	Raka
2009	Love on Line (LOL)	Paula Taylor
2010	The Little Comedian (บ้านฉัน..ตลกไว้ก่อน (พ่อสอนไว้))	Dr. Ice
2010	Song Pradtana	Pradtana
2011	Hellgate	Som
2014	The Pararell (ร่าง)	Amy
2024	Taklee Genesis	Stella

=== Television ===
Show	Network	Role
La Ong Tet	Channel 3	La Ong Tet
[V] Boutique	Channel [V] Thailand	VJ
Chef to Go	QTV	Guest
SOP	GMA Network	Guest
Eat Bulaga!	GMA Network	Guest
The Amazing Race Asia 2	AXN Asia	Co-Competitor with Natasha Monks
The Amazing Race Asia 3	AXN Asia	Local Greeter at Leg 1
Lady Mahachon		
True Love Next Door Season 1&2 (เนื้อคู่ประตูถัดไป)	MCOT	Kwan Jai
True Love Next Door Season 3 (เนื้อคู่อยากรู้ว่าใคร)	Channel 5	Kwan Jai
True Love Next Door Season 4 (เนื้อคู่ The Final Answer)	GTH Channel	Kwan Jai
SOP	GMA Network	Guest host – August 16, 2009
Full House	GMA Network	Cameo
The Apartment - Celebrity Edition	Star World	Contestant
Club Friday The Series Season 8		Kate

=== Music videos ===
- "Yah Lop Tah" by JR-Voy
- "Sexy" by Paradox
- "Tell Me Your Name" by Christian Bautista
- Maak Maai by Bie The Star
