= Kawee Tanjararak =

Thai actor and singer (born 1980)

- กวี ตันจรารักษ์
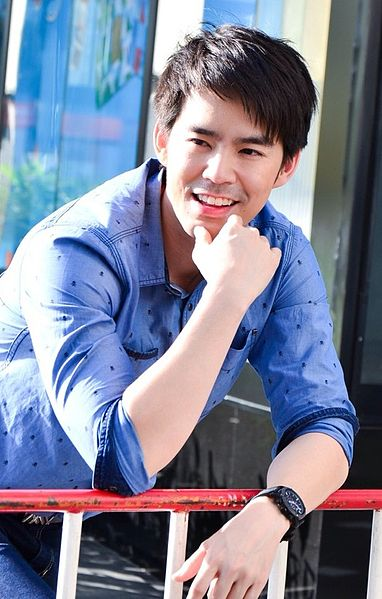
- Tanjararak at Maleenont Building
- Born: Rawee Tanjararak; 18 May 1980 (age 46); Bangkok, Thailand
- Other name: Beam
- Occupations: Actor; businessman; singer; TV host; YouTubers
- Years active: 1999–present
- Height: 1.76 m (5 ft 9 in)
- Spouse: Atiporn Chitthummawong (m. 2016)
- Children: 4
- Musical career
- Also known as: Beam D2B
- Genre: Thai pop
- Instruments: Piano; Thai xylophone; guitar
- Labels: RS (1999–2010); Freelance (2010–present)
- Formerly of: D2B
- Website: Archived 21 April 2009 at the Wayback Machine

Kawee Tanjararak (Thai: กวี ตันจรารักษ์, born 18 May 1980), nickname Beam, is a Thai singer and actor, who was a member of the Thai boy band D2B which also included Worrawech Danuwong and Panrawat Kittikorncharoen. After his contract with RS was invalidated, he became a freelance actor and singer.

== Biography ==
=== Early life ===
Kawee Tanjararak or Beam was born on 18 May 1980 in Thailand. He was named Rawee, but changed his name before he entered high school. He is the eldest brother of three siblings. He also has a younger sister, Bua-Sarocha, who is an actress and a singer.

=== Breakthrough ===
Beam debuted as model and actor when he was studying in year two of university. Then, he made contract with RS Public Company Limited 1999. Soon after, he was well known as a member of the Thai boy band D2B, which also included Dan-Worrawech and Big-Panrawat in 2001. D2B won the Most Popular Artists award from the MTV Music Awards of 2003 in Singapore, but, unfortunately, their second official album was just being revealed when sorrowful happening occurred.

On July 22, 2003, Big got in car accident and was in a coma. Because of this, Beam made the decision to ordain on September 21, 2003. After he left the monkhood, Beam and Dan performed the charity album "D2B the Neverending Album Tribute to Big D2B" and concert "D2B the Neverending Concert Tribute to Big D2B" to give Big's family the profit for treatment outgoing. Then, Beam traveled to Australia to study English program from Queensland College Of English for about six months.

In 2005, Beam and Dan come back as duo band Dan-Beam. Their album had received positive feedback just like D2B did, but, finally, they announced the termination of D2B on October 25, 2007. Their last special album "DB2B (Dan-Beam to Big)" was also the charity album for Big's family.

In 2008, Beam's solo album was released. Furthermore, he was assigned as the first WWF Ambassador of Thailand for three years continuously to participate in many environmental events, such as Earth Hour.

A year before termination of RS's contract in 2010, Beam was suspended by RS. So, he began to spend two years looking after his own business Trip Buster Ltd, which was closed down in 2013. He came back on screen in winter 2011 and released a solo single in summer 2012. Now, he is a freelance actor and singer.

=== Present and upcoming projects ===
- Role as Seong of Ra-Berd-Therd-Therng Sing-To-Thong the sitcom ... Airing
- Lun-Rak-Kham-Rua the series ... Airing
- Game-Ma-Ya ... Shooting
- Ban-Lang-Dok-Mai ... Shooting

* Ordered by official announcement date

=== Education ===
- Primary School: Assumption Samrong School
- High School: Rachwinit Bangkeaw School
- Diploma: Pre-Engineering Program, College of Industrial Technology from King Mongkut's University of Technology North Bangkok
- Under Graduate: B.Eng., Department of Mechanical Engineering, Faculty of Engineering from Chulalongkorn University
- Graduated: MBA English Program, Faculty of Commerce and Accountancy from Chulalongkorn University

== Career ==
=== Discography ===
==== Studio Album ====
===== D2B =====
- D2B (2001)
- D2B Summer (2002)
- Type Two (2003)
- D2B the Neverending Album Tribute to Big D2B (2004) ...Chan-Ja-Jab-Mheu-Ther-Aw-Wai song was produced by Beam (lyric) and Dan (melody).

===== Dan-Beam =====
- The Album (2005)
- The Album II: Relax (2006)
- The Album 3: Freedom (2007)
- DB2B (Dan-Beam to Big) (2007)

===== Beam =====
- Beam (2008) ...Duai-Hua-Jai-Ther song was written by Beam

==== Special songs ====
===== D2B =====
- Meu-Thee-Mong-Mai-Hen - RS Meeting Concert 2001 Star Mission's special song (2001)
- Tuk-Wi-Na-Thee (Acoustic Version) - RS Acoustic for Friends' special song (2002)
- Mee-Ther - RS Star Club's special song (2002)
- Marathon - Marathon Dance Expo (2003)
- Sud-Rang-Ten - Marathon Dance Expo (2003)
- Chai-Mak-A-Rom-Nee - Marathon Dance Expo (2003)
- D2B YMCA MIX - Marathon Dance Expo (2003)
- Yu-Thee-Ther-Leau - Anti-Counterfeit Concert (2003)
- Tham-Duai-Mhue Sang-Duai-Jai Anti-Counterfeit Concert (2003)

===== Dan-Beam =====
- Thing-Hua-Jai-Wai-Thee-Ther - MIXICLUB's special song (2005)
- Ya-Krod-Nan - MIXICLUB's special song (2005)
- Luk-Kong-Poe - Luk-Kong-Poe album (2006)
- Pleaw-Fai-Haeng-Plai-Fan - Suphanburi's Game (2006)
- Kon-Thai-Rak-Kan - Southern Thailand Insurgency-involved song (2006)
- Infinite - Freedom Around the World Live in Concert's special song (2007) ...Lyric by Beam and melody by Dan
- Nai-Jai-Ter-Mee-Hua-Jai-Chan-Eak-Duang - "Ma-Has-Sa-Jan-Kwam-Kid-Teung" D2B Encore Concert 2015 ...Melody by Dan

===== Beam =====
- Duai-Ai-Rak - OST. Sexphone and the Lonely Wave (2003)
- Klab-Ma-Dai-Mhai - OST. Sexphone and the Lonely Wave (2003)
- Tha-Mae-Mai-Leau-Krai-Rak - Missing Mom Riang-Kuam-Ruan-Mae album (2005)
- Porn-Kong-Poe - Luk-Kong-Poe album (2006)
- Kon-Klai-Chid-Kid-Ja-Seung - OST. Ku-Pan-Ku-Puan (2008)
- Pak-Kang-Kwa-Jai - OST. Sed-Thee-Kang-Khiang (2009)
- Sak-Wan-Chan-Ja-Jab-Mheu-Ther - OST. Sed-Thee-Kang-Khiang (2009)
- Jud-Plian - Love Maker II by AM:PM (2009)
- Mai-Yak-Mai-Mee-Ther - OST. Bangkok Sweeter (2011)
- Rak-Rai-Siang - OST. Mae-Tang-Rom-Bai (2012)
- Rak-Mai-Roo-Dab - OST. Jood-Nut-Pob (2012)

=== Concerts ===
==== D2B ====
- RS Meeting Concert Star Mission (2001) ... Guest
- D2B Summer Live in Concert (2002)
- Marathon Dance Expo Concert (2002) ... Guest
- D2B Goodtime Thanks Concert for Friends (2002)
- Anti-Counterfeiting Concert (2002) ... Guest
- D2B the Miracle Concert (2003)
- PCT Marathon Dance (2003) ... Guest
- Anti-Counterfeiting Concert (2002) ... Guest
- D2B the Neverending Concert Tribute to Big D2B (2004)
- "Kid-Teung" (Missing) D2B Live Concert 2014 (2014)
- "Ma-Has-Sa-Jan-Kwam-Kid-Teung" D2B Encore Concert 2015 (2015)

==== Dan-Beam ====
- Kid-Mak Concert (2005)
- Unseen Concert (2005)
- Riang-Kuam-Rung-Mae (2005) ... Guest
- Thai-Chinese Friendship Concert (2005) ... Guest
- Nice Club Concert (2006)
- Rao-Ja-Pen-Kon-Dee Concert (2007) ... Guest
- Freedom Around the World Live in Concert (2007)
- Concert Pleng-Khong-Po Ja-Rong-Pleng-Po Hai-Preo-Tee-Sud (2014) ... Guest

==== Beam ====
- One Man & Fan-Krai-Mai-Ru Concert (2008)
- Salz Systema Show in One 22 (2009) ...Guest
- Halloo Beam Concert (2009)
- My Name is Kim Concert (2009) ...Guest
- My Blue World Concert (2009) ...Guest
- 72 Years Chula Accounting Charity Concert and Enjoy with Soontraporn Song (2011) ...Guest

=== Music videos ===
- Ther-Rak-Chan-Roo - Momay (2001)
- Sa-Pa-Wa-Thing-Tua - Dan (2011)
- Bao-Wan - Wan Thanakrit (2012)

=== Filmography ===
- Where is Tong (2001) ... Khing
- Omen (2003) ... Beam
- Sexphone and the Lonely Wave (2003) ... Due
- Noodle Boxer (2006) ... - (Extra)
- Ponglang Amazing Theatre (2007) ... Win
- Bangkok Sweety (2011) ... Fin
- Valentine Sweety (2012) ... Fin
- Sat2Mon (2012) ... Pokpong
- The Room (2013) ... Bo

=== Television ===
==== Lakorns (Thai-style series) ====
- Pee-Nong-Song-Luad (2005) ... Phuwanart
- Hi Baby! (2005–2006) ... Cherngchai
- Mang-Korn-Soan-Pa-Yak (2006) ... Morakot
- Pud-Rak-Na-Mo (2007) ... Mothana
- Ku-Pan-Ku-Puan (2007–2008) ... Somkid
- Four Reigns (special episode) (2008) ... Aod
- Sed-Thee-Kang-Kiang (2010) ... Kim
- Mae-Tang-Rom-Bai (2012) ... Mike-Maitree
- Than-Chai-Nai-Sai-Mhok (2012) ... Fahkram(Extra)
- The Raven and the Swan (2013) ... Saharat
- Rak-Sud-Rit (2013) ... POL.SUB.LT. Tan Sattayarak
- Song-Rak-Song-Win-Yan (2015) ... Wach-Anawach
- Game-Ma-Ya (2016) ... Kawin Akkarawong (Wim)
- Ban-Lang-Dok-Mai (2016) ... Songrob Buriyaprawat (rob)
- Glarb Pai Soo Wun Fun (2019) ... Dr.Kanchat
- Game Rak Ao Keun (2019) ... Dr.Akkapoom
- Ran Dok Ngiew (2022) ... Dr.Adthanob Parama (Nob)

==== Series and sitcoms ====
- Rod-Duan-Ka-Buan-Sud-Thai (2005–2006) ... Jue
- Puan-Sab-See-Kun-See (2006) ... V(Guest)
- Love Therapy (2011) ... Doc. Phum-Phumrat
- Jood-Nut-Pob (2012–2015) ... Pop-POL.CAPT. Eakkapop Benjanakin
- Sud-Yod (2012) ... Doc. Good(Guest)
- Ra-Berd-Tiang-Thaew-Trong (2014) ... Dr.Kim
- Ra-Berd-Therd-Therng Sing-To-Thong (2015–present) ... Seong
- Lun-Rak-Kham-Rua (2015–Present) ... Tee-Yai
- Turn Left Turn Right (2020) ... Pat

==== Show ====
- Dan-Beam the Series (2007) ...Moderator
- Thailand's Most Famous (2012) ... Commentator
- Tua-Jing the Premier (2013–2014) ... Competitor

== MC ==
Television

- 2007 : "แดนบีม เดอะซีรีส์" On Air Channel 9

Online

- 2019 : - On Air YouTube:Beam-Oil Channel
