= Taksaorn Paksukcharern =

Thai actress and model (born 1980)

- ทักษอร ภักดิ์สุขเจริญ
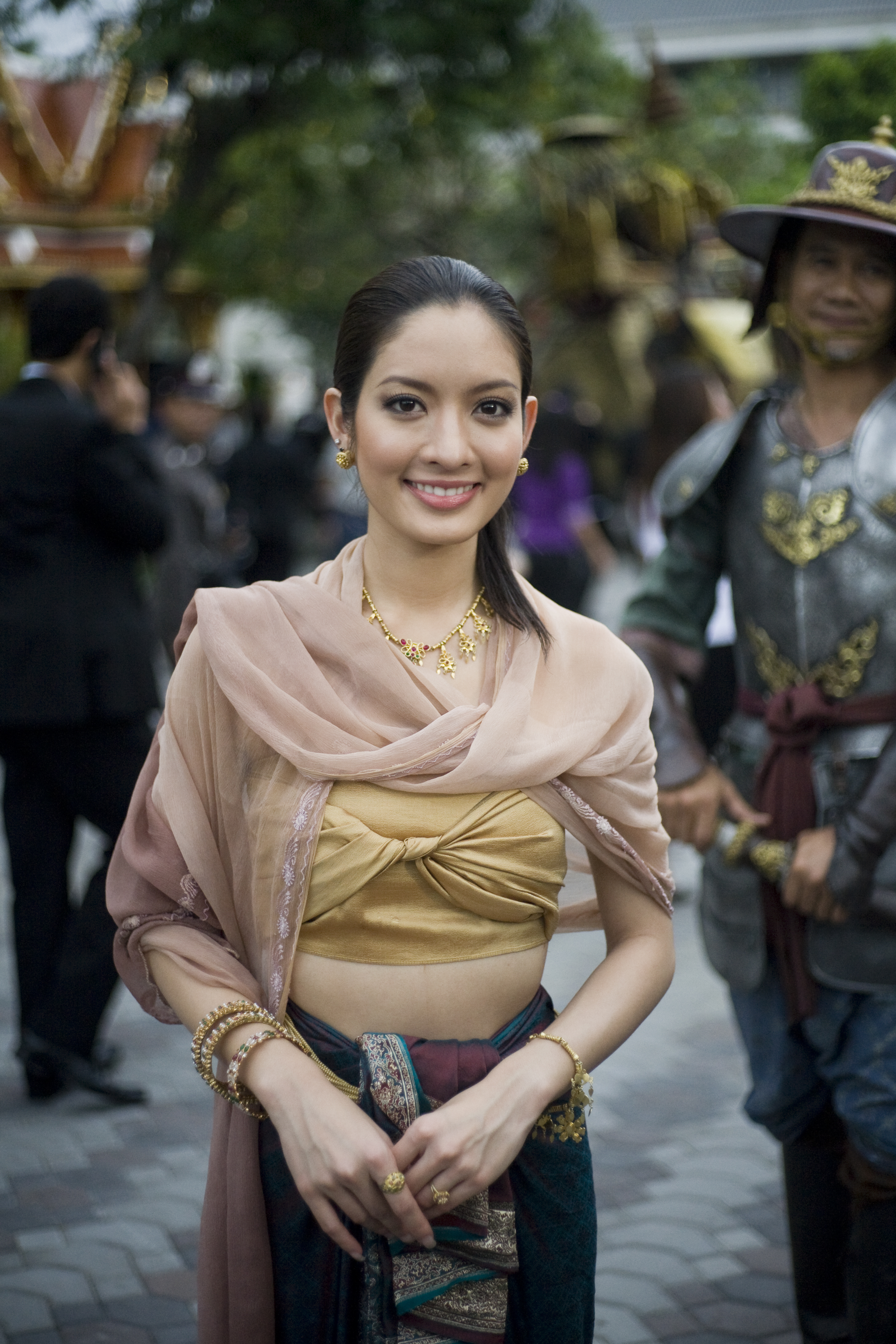
- Taksaorn at a film press conference in 2009
- Born: October 27, 1980 (age 46); Bangkok, Thailand
- Other name: Aff
- Occupations: Actress; model
- Years active: 2001–present
- Agent: Channel 3 (2006–2016)
- Notable work: Chamloei Rak
- Spouse: Songkran Tejanarong (m. 2012; div. 2018)
- Children: 1

Signature
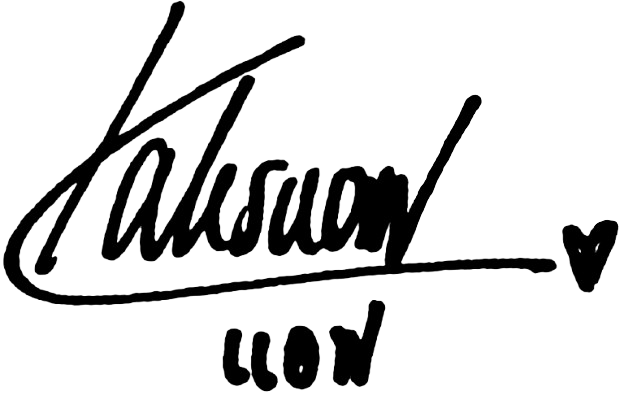

Taksaorn Paksukcharern (Thai: ทักษอร ภักดิ์สุขเจริญ, RTGS: Thaksa-on Phaksukcharoen; born 27 October 1980) is a Thai actress and model who has starred in several lakorns. She is known for her roles in the 2008 version of Jam Loey Rak as well as the title character in Wanida (2010), which won Best Foreign Series at the International Drama Festival in Tokyo. She graduated with BA from Chulalongkorn University.

== Personal life ==
In 2012, she married Songkran Taechanarong, they lived separately for over a year after his affair was exposed. The actress filed for divorce on September 25, 2018. Now she is a single mom and lives with her daughter, Peemai Taechanarong, born in 2015. Songkran's brother, Pupaa Taechanarong is dating the CH3 actress Chalida Vijitvongthong. In 2023, she started a relationship with the Thai actor Chanon Santinatornkul known as "Nonkul", sixteen years younger than her.

== Education ==
- Elementary: Patai Udom Suksa School
- Secondary: Rajinibon School
- Bachelor's degree in Communications, Chulalongkorn University

== Filmography ==
=== Television ===
- Mit Chaibancha MayaCheevit (with Akara Amarttayakul)
- Risaya (with Job Nithi) (2003)
- Phoo Chai Mue Song (with Chai Chattayodom Hiranyatthiti) (2004)
- Puen Rak (with Karunpon Tieansuwan) (2005)
- Mon Rak Lottery (with Worrawech Danuwong) (2006)
- Tee Takul Song (with Gig Danai) (2006)
- Jom Jai (with Dom Hetrakul) (2007)
- Meuh Dok Rak Ban (with Mart Krissada) (2007)
- Jam Leoy Rak (with Aum Atichart) (2008)
- Botan Gleep Sudtai (with Aum Atichart) (2008)
- Jai Rao (with Ken Theeradej Wongpuapan) (2008)
- Prajan See Roong (with Bie Sukrit Wisetkaew) (2009)
- Namtan Mai (with Aum Atichart) (2009)
- Wanida (with Tik Jesdaporn Pholdee) (2010)
- Roy Mai (with Aum Atichart) (2011)
- Rak Prakasit (with Natthawut Skidjai) (2012)
- Kor kerd mai klai klai ter (2020)

=== Film ===
- King Naresuan Part I: Hongsawadee's Hostage (2007)
- King Naresuan Part II: Reclamation of Sovereignty (2007)
- Bangkok Traffic (Love) Story (2009)
- King Naresuan Part III: Naval Battle (2011)
- King Naresuan Part IV: The Nanda Bayin War (2011)
- King Naresuan Part V: Elephant Battle (2014)
- King Naresuan Part VI: The End of Hong Sa (2015)

=== Advertisement ===
- Garnier
- Toyota
- SB Furniture (with Ken Teeradej)
- SB Design Square (with Araya Alberta Hargate)
- Tropicana Twister (with Rome Patchata)
