= I Sea U =

2018 Thai television series

- Official poster
- Thai: ฉันรักทะเล...ที่มีเธอ
- Genre: Romance; Drama
- Created by: Lasercat Studio
- Based on: Munin Saiprasart Comic
- Written by: Techit Techasirioangkun
- Directed by: Poy Napat Pattamasing Na Ayutaya
- Starring: Ungsumalynn Sirapatsakmetha; Jesse Mekwattana; Vachirawit Chivaaree
- Opening theme: Throw, Throw, by Ungsumalynn Sirapatsakmetha
- Country of origin: Thailand
- Original language: Thai
- No. of seasons: 1
- No. of episodes: 16

Production
- Producer: Dan Worrawech Danuwong
- Cinematography: Tanai Nimcharonepong; Veekit Tiranasawasd
- Running time: 45 minutes
- Production companies: TRUE4U & Lasercat Studio

Original release
- Network: TRUE4U Channel 24
- Release: 20 February – 16 April 2018

I.Sea.U (Thai: ฉันรักทะเล...ที่มีเธอ means 'I Love the Sea…with You') is based on the popular comic book by a cartoonist Munin Saiprasart. It is a romantic Thai series about a girl who believes in the concept of childhood first love. The series features Ungsumalynn Sirapatsakmetha, Jesse Mekwattana and Bright Vachirawit Chivaaree in main roles. The series is directed by Napat Patamasingh Na Ayutthaya and produced by Dan Worrawech Danuwong. It is showcased by Lasercat Studio and TRUE 4U network.

== Synopsis ==
Young Talay, a country girl grew up near the seaside, living and playing along with a Canadian boy Peter. They were separated when young Peter had to leave the village along with his family. Then onwards, they would send drawings in order to retain their bond and memories of each other. At one point, these letters, pictures and the responses from Peter stops, which makes Talay sad. At Present, Talay meets Naphat, a cool boy from the neighbourhood, and around him she embarks into an impressive new experiences. There is genuine feeling of goodness between them.

One day, a boy comes to the seaside and he leaves his painting at the shop. Talay notice this painting and immediately recalls Peter. It is nostalgic feeling for Talay, but Peter does not remember much and thus wants to create new memories with her. He is hiding a huge secret from her and is also trying to separate her from Naphat. On other end, Talay is contemplating on her idea of true childhood love which she harboured for years, as she observes some differences between present Peter and Peter in her memories. She is also confused with her recent affection for Naphat and her mix feelings for her childhood friend Peter.

== Casts ==
Character	Cast	Notes
Talay	Pattie Ungsumalynn Sirapatsakmetha	A village girl who lives near seaside who loved Peter when she was a kid. In her youth, she shows interests for Naphat before Peter returns.
Naphat “Jing”	Jesse Mekwattana	He meets Talay in her youth and has feelings for her.
Peter/ Peyton	Bright Vachirawit Chivaaree	Peter is Talay's childhood love and best friend.
April	Zom Marie	Peter's best friend
Bew	Newclear Hansa Jungviwattanawong	She likes Naphat
Talay's father	Ton Jakkrit Ammarat	Supporting role
Talay's mother	Saitharn Niyomkarn	Supporting role
Peter's mother	Tao Sarocha Watittapan	Supporting role
Jing's father	Wayne Falconer	Supporting role
Jing's mother	Sine Inthira Charoenpura	Supporting role
Pae-kong	Poy Napat Pattamasing Na Ayutaya	Supporting role
Young Talay	Yaimai Shinaradee Anupongpichart	Guest role

== Soundtracks ==
Song	Singer	Channel	Ref.
Throw, Throw, Release (เพลง โยน ทิ้ง ปล่อย)	Pattie Ungsumalynn Sirapatsakmetha	Lasercat Studio	
I'll Wait (ฉันจะรอ)	Praew Kanitkul	Lasercat Studio Selenophile	
Away... Miss you (ห่าง...คิดถึง)	Zom Marie	Zommarie	
To be in your heart ( เพื่อได้อยู่ในใจเธอ)	Chatarat Sridumrongrak (Jing Helmethead)	Lasercat Studio	

== Production ==
Dan Worrawech Danuwong, a famous actor and singer, turned behind the scenes to produce quality series and became a full-time drama organizer. This time he invested in a new drama named I.Sea.U, an adaptation of a famous comic book composition by a cartoonist Munin Saiprasart. The series was primarily shot near the seaside, underwater or submerge. Munin met the cast from the beginning and had various workshops, so that the cast could portray the characters as close as possible to her illustrations in the cartoon.

== Releases ==
The series was developed by "Lasercat Studio" and was aired on every Monday & Tuesday at 20:30 ICT on TRUE 4U Channel 24. Behind the scenes was launched on February 1, 2018, and towards the end making of the series was shown on 28 April 2018, on Lasercat Studio's official accounts. The series first episode was released on 20 February 2018. Four official OST was also launched during the broadcast, displaying the themes of the series.
