= D2B (band) =

Thai musical group

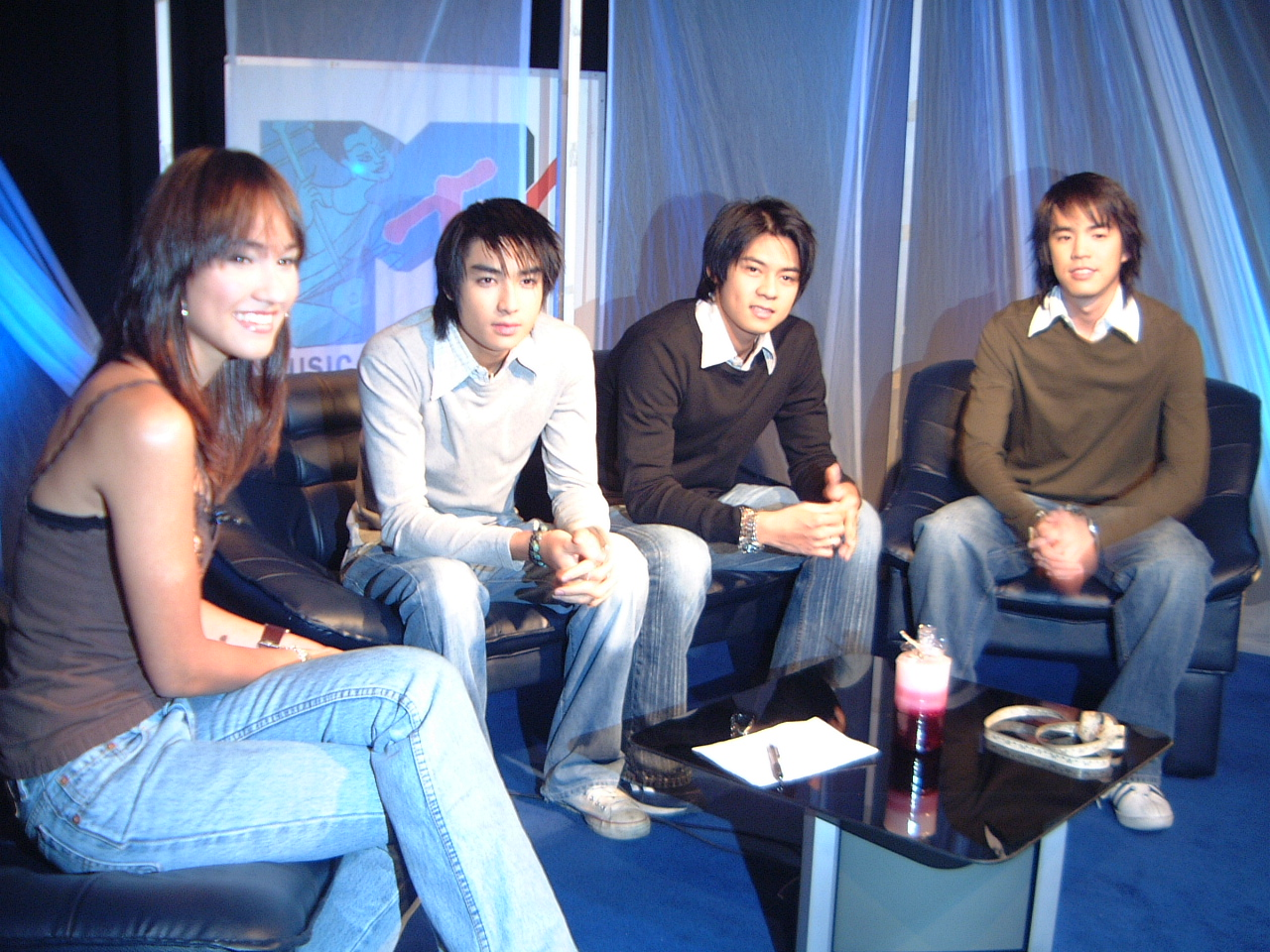

Background information
- Born: D2B
- Origin: Thailand
- Genre: Pop
- Occupation: Singer
- Years active: 2001–2004 (D2B); 2005–2007 (Dan-Beam)
- Past members: Panrawat Kittikorncharoen (deceased); Worrawech Danuwong; Kawee Tanjararak

D2B (Thai: ดีทูบี) was a Thai vocal group and boy band formed by Panrawat "Big" Kittikoncharoen, Worrawech "Dan" Danuwong, and Kawee "Beam" Tanjararak in 2001 and launched by the Thai record label, RS promotion. Their debut album, D2B, released December 19, 2003.

The group has millions of streams on Spotify, with their number 1 song being คนใจอ่อน(อ่อนใจ). The group also won the "Favorite Artist Thailand" Award at the MTV Asia Awards 2003.

== Members ==
The three members of the group were:

- Panrawat Kittikorncharoen, nickname Big (born 2 December 1982 – died 9 December 2007)
- Worrawech Danuwong, nickname Dan, (born 16 May 1984)
- Kawee Tanjararak, nickname Beam, (born 18 May 1980)

== History ==
The name "D2B" was created from the first letters of the members' nicknames, Dan, Big, and Beam, in which one name started with a "D" and 2 names started with a "B".

D2B was a popular Thai boy band that have sold more than a million copies.

On July 22, 2003, Panrawat "Big" Kittikoncharoen was involved in a major accident where his car flipped into a dirty roadside canal, leading to a bacterial infection in his brain. After being in a coma and persistent vegetative state for 4 years, he died on December 9, 2007.

After Big had slipped into a coma, Dan and Beam continued their musical careers and released several duo albums. They went by the name "Dan-Beam". In 2005 Dan and Beam came out with their first album together called "Dan-Beam the album". Then in 2006 they came out with the second album " Dan-Beam the 2nd album Relax" and in 2007 they came out with their third album "Dan-Beam the 3rd album Freedom" and last and special album "DB2B". Worawech Danuwong (Dan) decided to leave RS Promotion and announced this decision on October 25, 2007. That meant the termination of D2B as well. And, soon after, Big died on December 9, 2007. Beam still remained under RS. However, in June 2010, RS suspended Beam and decided not to renew his contract. Now, Dan works under contract with Sony Entertainment and Beam is a freelance artist.

== Discography ==
=== Studio albums ===
==== D2B ====
- 2001: D2B
- 2002: D2B Summer
- 2003: D2B Type II
- 2004: D2B The Neverending Album Tribute To Big D2B

==== Dan-Beam ====
- 2005: Dan-Beam The Album
- 2006: Dan-Beam The Album II Relax
- 2007: Dan-Beam The Album 3 Freedom
- 2007: DB2B (Dan & Beam To Big)

==== Special Project ====
- TV SoundTrack: WaiRaiFreshy
- Movie SoundTrack: Sexphone & The Lonely Wave
- Movie SoundTrack: Noodles Boxer
- THE MESSAGES – Various Artists
- MISS MOM 2 (Thai: คิดถึงแม่ เรียงความเรื่องแม่) – Various Artists
- DAD (Thai: ลูกของพ่อ) – Various Artists

=== Concerts ===
- 2002: D2B Summer Live In Concert
- 2002: D2B GoodTime Thanks Concert For Friends
- 2003: D2B The Miracle Concert
- 2004: D2B The Neverending Concert Tribute To Big D2B
- 2005: Dan&Beam Concert KidMark
- 2005: Dan&Beam Unseen Concert
- 2006: Nice Club Concert By Dan&Beam
- 2007: Dan&Beam Freedom Around The World Live In Concert
- 2008: Beam Solo Concert : One Man and FanKraiMaiRoo Concert
- 2008: Beam Solo Concert : Halloo Beam Concert
- 2009: Dan Solo Concert : My Blue Concert
- 2014: "Kid-Teung" (Missing) D2B Live Concert 2014
- 2015: "Wonderful.....Nostalgia D2B ENCORE CONCERT 2015"
- 2019: "D2B Infinity Concert 2019"
- 2020: "COOLfahrenheit Lae (And) TISCO My Care Smart

Present D2B Infinity Fun+ 2020

- 2023: "AMPOLFOOD(อําพลฟูดส์) Presents D2B Eternity CONCERT 2023

== Filmography ==
=== Films ===
- 2001: Where is Tong (Thai: ๙ พระคุ้มครอง) starring: Beam D2B
- 2003: Sanghorn : Omen (Thai: สังหรณ์) starring: D2B
- 2003: Sexphone & The Lonely Wave : The Girl Next Door(Thai: Sexphone/คลื่นเหงา/สาวข้างบ้าน) starring: Beam D2B and Paula Taylor
- 2006: Noodles Boxer (Thai: แสบสนิท ศิษย์ส่ายหน้า) starring: Dan D2B and Jah Nutthaveeranuch Thongmee, Beam D2B as a cameo appearance
- 2007: Ponglang Amazing Theater (Thai: โปงลางสะดิ้ง ลำซิ่งส่ายหน้า) starring: Beam D2B, Mai Wisa Sarasart, Ponglangsaon The Band

=== Television Series (Lakorns) ===
- 2002: WaiRaiFreshy (Thai: วัยร้ายเฟรชชี่) – (Dan & Big)
- 2004: KooKam 2 (Thai: คู่กรรม 2) – (Dan)
- 2005: PeeNongSongLuead (Thai: พี่น้องสองเลือด) – (Dan & Beam)
- 2005: RotDuanKabuanSudtai (Thai: รถด่วนขบวนสุดท้าย) – (Beam)
- 2005: HoiAnChunRukTher (Thai: ฮอยอัน ฉันรักเธอ) – (Dan)
- 2005: NaiKrajok (Thai: นายกระจอก) – (Dan)
- 2005: JaAerBaby (Hi Baby!) (Thai: จ๊ะเอ๋ เบบี้) – (Beam)
- 2006: MonRukLottery (Thai: มนต์รักล็อตเตอรี่) – (Dan)
- 2006: MungKornSornPayuk (Thai: มังกรซ่อนพยัคฆ์) – (Beam)
- 2006: PeeChai (Thai: พี่ชาย) – (Dan)
- 2007: PootRukNamo (Thai: ภูตรักนะโม) – (Dan & Beam)
- 2007: PeeKaewNangHong (Thai: ปี่แก้วนางหงส์) – (Dan)
- 2008: KooPunKooPuan (Thai: คู่ปั่นคู่ป่วน) – (Beam)
- 2008: SeePaanDin (Special program) (Thai: สี่แผ่นดิน(ฉบับ พระปกเกล้าราชา ก่อนาวาประชาธิปไตย) – (Beam)
- 2009: SetThiKangKiang (Thai: เศรษฐีข้างเขียง) – (Beam)
- 2009: KuLarbSornNarm (Thai: กุหลาบซ่อนหนาม) – (Dan)
- 2009: Spy the Series (Thai: สายลับเดอะซีรี่ส์ กับ 24 คดีสุดห้ามใจ) – (Dan)
- 2010: Chocolate 5 Season (Thai: ช็อคโกแลตห้าฤดู) - (Dan)
- 2011: SudYod (Thai: สุดยอด) – (Dan)
- 2011: SuebSuanPuanRak (Thai: สืบสวนป่วนรัก) – (Dan)
- 2011: PhomRakLukSaoJaoPho (Thai: ช่วยด้วยครับ ผมรั(ลั)กลูกสาวเจ้าพ่อ) – (Dan)
- 2011: Love Therapy (Thai: บำบัดรักบำรุงสุข) – (Beam)
- 2012: JoodNatPob (Thai: จุดนัดภพ) – (Beam)
- 2012: SudYod (Thai: สุดยอด ปีสอง) – (Dan)
- 2012: MaeTangRomBai (Thai: แม่แตงร่มใบ) – (Beam)
- 2012: TanChaiNaiSaiMork (Thai: ท่านชายในสายหมอก) – (Beam) ... Guest
- 2012: JoodNatPob Year 2 (Thai: จุดนัดภพ ปีสอง) – (Beam)
- 2012: The Raven and the Swan (Thai: กากับหงส์) – (Beam)
- -: RakSudRid (Thai: รักสุดฤทธิ์) – (Beam)

=== Dramas ===
Year	Thai title	Title	Role	With	ผลิตโดย	Network	Past members
2001	วัยร้ายไฮสคูล	Wai Rai High School	บิ๊ก; Big (Guest Star)		RS	Channel 3	Apichet Kittikorncharoen
2001	วัยร้ายไฮสคูล	Wai Rai High School	แดน; Dan (Guest Star)		RS	Channel 3	Worrawech Danuwong
2002	วัยร้ายเฟรชชี่	Wai Rai Freshy	บิ๊ก; Big	Aon Lakkana Huangmaneerungroj	RS	Channel 3	Apichet Kittikorncharoen
2002	วัยร้ายเฟรชชี่	Wai Rai Freshy	แดน; Dan	Nathalie Davies	RS	Channel 3	Worrawech Danuwong
2004	คู่กรรม 2	Koo Gum 2	กลินท์ / โยอิจิ Kalin/Yoichi (Yo)	Manasnan Panlertwongskul	RS	Channel 3	Worrawech Danuwong
2005	พี่น้อง 2 เลือด	Pee Nong Song Lued	ภาคี รัตนมณี Pakee Rattanamanee	Evitra Sirasatra	RS	Channel 9	Worrawech Danuwong
2005	พี่น้อง 2 เลือด	Pee Nong Song Lued	ภูวนาถ อัศวโยธิน (); Puwanat Assawayotin	Manasnan Panlertwongskul	RS	Channel 9	Kawee Tanjararak
2005	ฮอยอันฉันรักเธอ	Hoi Un Chun Ruk Tur	เมืองแมน / ยูริค; Miung Man	Janie Tienphosuwan	RS	Channel 3	Worrawech Danuwong
2005	นายกระจอก	Nai Krajok	ก้อง; Kong	Sara Legge	RS	Channel 3	Worrawech Danuwong
2005	จ๊ะเอ๋ เบบี้	Ja Ae Baby	เชิงชาย (แม็กซ์); Chiengchai (Max)	Pakramai Potranant	RS	Channel 3	Kawee Tanjararak
2006	มนต์รักล็อตเตอรี่	Mon Ruk Lottery	ตะวันฉาย; Tawanchay	Taksaorn Paksukcharern	RS	Channel 3	Worrawech Danuwong
2006	มังกรซ่อนพยัคฆ์	Mang Korn Son Pa Yak	มรกต; Morakod	Pakramai Potranant	RS	Channel 3	Kawee Tanjararak
2006	พี่ชาย	Pee Chai	Somchay	Sarocha Tunjararuk	RS	Channel 3	Worrawech Danuwong
2007	ภูตรักนะโม	Poot Rak Na Mo	โมทนา; Motana	Benz Punyaporn Pongpipat	RS	Channel 7	Kawee Tanjararak
2007	ภูตรักนะโม	Poot Rak Na Mo	ปาณะ; Pana	Sarocha Tunjararuk	RS	Channel 7	Worrawech Danuwong
2007	คู่ปั่นคู่ป่วน	Koo Pun Koo Puan	สมคิด; Somkid	Amy Amika Klinprathum	RS	Channel 7	Kawee Tanjararak
2007	ปี่แก้วนางหงส์	Pbee Kaew Nang Hong	คุณราช / นิราช; Kunrat / Kunnirat	Ae Isariya Saisanan	RS	Channel 3	Worrawech Danuwong
2008	สี่แผ่นดิน (ฉบับ พระปกเกล้าราชา ก่อนาวาธิปไตย)	Four Reigns	คุณอ๊อด; Kun-Eod			Channel 5	Kawee Tanjararak
2010	กุหลาบซ่อนหนาม	Kularb Son Narm	พารณ โภควินทร์ (รัก); Paron Pokkawim (Rak)	Bow Chotima	Geinokei Co., Ltd.	Channel 3	Worrawech Danuwong
2010	เศรษฐีข้างเขียง	Sethee Kaang Kiang	Kim	Four Sakolrat Wornurai	RS	Channel 3	Kawee Tanjararak
2010	สืบสวนป่วนรัก	Seub Suan Puan Ruk (2010)	ปีแสง; Peeseang Sakundamrong (Pee-Pi)	Gijee Jomkwan Leelaphongprasut	Geinokei Co., Ltd.	Channel 3	Worrawech Danuwong
2011	สืบสวนป่วนกำลังสาม	Suepsuan Puan Kamlang 3	ปีแสง; Peeseang Sakundamrong (Pee-Pi)	Gijee Jomkwan Leelaphongprasut	Geinokei Co., Ltd.	Channel 3	Worrawech Danuwong
2011	ช่วยด้วยครับ ผมรักลูกสาวเจ้าพ่อ	Chuay Duay Krap Pom Rak Look Sao Jao Por	คิม; Kim	Four Sakolrat Wornurai	RS	Channel 8	Worrawech Danuwong
2012	แม่แตงร่มใบ	Mae Taeng Rom Bai (2012)	ไมตรี (ไมค์); Maitree (Mike)	Namfon Patcharin	STEP ONNARD COMPANY LIMITED	Channel 3	Kawee Tanjararak
2012	ท่านชายในสายหมอก	Tarnchai Nai Sai Mok (2012)	ฟ้าคราม; Fahkram (Guest Star)		TV Thunder	Channel 3	Kawee Tanjararak
2013	ฟาร์มเอ๋ย ฟาร์มรัก	Farm Euy Farm Ruk	วิศว์ Wit	Sririta Jensen Narongdej	Geinokei Co., Ltd.	Channel 3	Worrawech Danuwong
2013	กากับหงส์	Ga Gub Hong	สหรัฐ; Saharat (Rat)	Sawika Chaiyadech	Sonix Youth 1999 Co., Ltd.	Channel 8	Kawee Tanjararak
2013	รักสุดฤทธิ์	Ruk Sutrit	ร.ต.ต.ธรรม์ สัตยาภักดิ์ Tam Sadtayapak	Wawaa Nichari Chokprajakchat	Wave TV Co, Ltd.	Channel 3	Kawee Tanjararak
2015	เคหาสน์ดาว	Kay Hard Dao	เข้ม; Kem	Ornjira Larmwilai	The One Enterprise Co, Ltd.	One 31	Worrawech Danuwong
2015	แก้วตาหวานใจ	Keaw Ta Warn Jai 2015	พ๊อพ; POP (Guest Star)		Wave TV Co, Ltd.	Channel 3	Kawee Tanjararak
2015	ซิ่งรักทะลุมิติ	Parallel Universe	ดิม; Dim	Apittha Klaiudom	บริษัท เลเซอร์แคท จำกัด	True4U	Worrawech Danuwong
2015	2 รัก 2 วิญญาณ	Song Rak Song Winyan	อนวัช สารพัฒน์ Anawach Sarapat (wach)	Peak Pattarasaya Kreursuwansiri	The One Enterprise Co, Ltd.	One 31	Kawee Tanjararak
2017	ชะนีผีผลัก	Chanee Pee Plak	โชติ สุรีย์ฉาย (โช); Chod Sureechai (Cho)	Patsaya Kreursuwansiri	Raruek Production Co, Ltd.	Workpoint TV	Kawee Tanjararak
2017	บัลลังก์ดอกไม้	Bunlang Dok Mai	ทรงรบ บุริยประเวศน์ (รบ); Songrob Buriyaprawat (Rob)	Matcha Mosimann	Wave TV Co, Ltd.	Channel 3	Kawee Tanjararak
2017	เกมมายา	Game Maya	กวิน อัครวงศ์ (วิน); Kawin Akkarawong (Wim)	Atma Chewanitphan	The One Enterprise Co, Ltd.	One 31	Kawee Tanjararak
2018	รูปทอง	Rup Thong	รัสสะ ดุจแสง (หมู); Rassa Dudseang (Moo)	Jarinya Sirimongkolsakul	KENG KWANG KANG Co, Ltd.	GMM 25	Worrawech Danuwong
2018	เนตรนาคิน (มายาพิศวาส)	Naet Nakin	นพ.อิศรา มหาเวช (อิศ); Dr.Itsara Mahawad (It)	Susira Nanna	The One Enterprise Co, Ltd.	One 31	Worrawech Danuwong
2019	กลับไปสู่วันฝัน	Glarb Pai Soo Wun Fun	นพ.คันฉัตร; Dr.Kanchat	Ornlene Sothiwanwongse; Chonticha Nuamsukon	CHANGE2561	PPTVHD36	Kawee Tanjararak
2019	เกมรักเอาคืน	Game Rak Ao Keun	นพ.เอกภูมิ วราณุรักษ์ (เอก); Dr.Akkapoom Waranurak (Ak)	Woranuch Bhirombhakdi; Napapa Tantrakul	PRAKAIFAH PRODUCTION Co, Ltd.	GMM 25	Kawee Tanjararak
2019	สะใภ้ TKO	Sapai TKO	รวิชญ์ จรัสปกรณ์ Rawich Jaraspakorn	Ungsumalynn Sirapatsakmetha	GMM CHANNEL	GMM 25	Worrawech Danuwong
2022	ร่านดอกงิ้ว	Ran Dok Ngiew	นพ.อรรณพ ปารมา (ณพ); Dr.Adthanob Parama (Nob)	Chiranan Manochaem	GOOD BOY Entertainment	Channel 8	Kawee Tanjararak
2022	ยมทูตกับภูตสาว	Love Forever After; Yomathut Kub Poot Sao	ศรันย์ นิธิพัฒน์ธนกุล (รัน); Saran Nitipadthanakun (Run)	Natasha Chulanond	LOVE DRAMA Co, Ltd.	Channel 3	Kawee Tanjararak

=== Series ===
Year	Thai title	Title	Role	With	ผลิตโดย	Network	Past members
2009	สายลับเดอะซีรี่ส์ กับ 24 คดีสุดห้ามใจ		ฉลาม; Chalam	Ungsumalynn Sirapatsakmetha	GMM Tai Hub	Channel 9	Worrawech Danuwong
2010-2011	ช็อกโกแลต 5 ฤดู	Chocolate 5 Reudoo	ตวัด; Tawad	Sheranut Yusananda	GMMTV	Channel 9	Worrawech Danuwong
2011	หนังดังสุดสัปดาห์ ตอน...หลานซ่า อาแสบ		Tong		Wave TV Co, Ltd.	Channel 3	Kawee Tanjararak
2011	Love Therapy บำบัดรัก บำรุงสุข		Dr.Phum	Wanida Termthanaporn	RS	Channel 9	Kawee Tanjararak
2012-15	จุดนัดภพ	Jut Nat Pope	POP (POP) - R.T.O. Eakkapob Benjanakin	Sushar Manaying	Wave TV Co, Ltd.	Channel 3	Kawee Tanjararak
2015	ลุ้นรักข้ามรั้ว		Teeyai	ปริศนา กัมพูสิริ	RS	Channel 8	Kawee Tanjararak
2016	Love Songs Love Stories เพลง ก้อนหินก้อนนั้น		ดิน; Din	Yarinda Bunnag	GMMTV	GMM 25	Worrawech Danuwong
2016	คิวชู เดอะซีรีส์		แดน; Dan		บริษัท เลเซอร์แคท จำกัด	True4U	Worrawech Danuwong
2016	True Love Story เพราะเธอคือรัก ตอน กาลครั้งหนึ่ง		Tee	Natthaweeranuch Thongmee	TrueVisions	True4U	Kawee Tanjararak
2016	True Love Story เพราะเธอคือรัก ตอน รักที่แตกต่าง		อาร์ม; Arm	Khemanit Jamikorn	TrueVisions	True4U	Worrawech Danuwong
2016	เราเกิดในรัชกาลที่ ๙ เดอะซีรีส์		เต้ Te'		The One Enterprise Co, Ltd.	One 31	Worrawech Danuwong
2016	เราเกิดในรัชกาลที่ ๙ เดอะซีรีส์		ต้น; Ton		The One Enterprise Co, Ltd.	One 31	Kawee Tanjararak
2017	Encore 100 Million Views ไม่เคย ตอน ลืมรัก ไม่ลืมเธอ		เดียว; Diaw	Ornjira Lamwilai	GMM Bravo	GMM 25	Worrawech Danuwong
2017	Club Friday Celeb's Stories ตอน ความสุข	Club Friday Celeb's Stories	ธีร์ Tee	Thikamporn Ritta-apinan	A-TIME MEDIA	GMM 25	Worrawech Danuwong
2017	แสงจากพ่อ ตอน จุดสุดแสง		ฟิล์ม; Film			Thai PBS	Worrawech Danuwong
2017	Encore 100 Million Views ภูมิแพ้กรุงเทพ ตอน ปั้นรักใหม่หัวใจดวงเดิม		Tod	Sakolrat Wornurai	GMM Bravo	GMM 25	Kawee Tanjararak
2017	30 กำลังแจ๋ว The Series	Fabulous 30: The Series	Captain Nop	Kridtapon Montirarat	GMMTV	One 31	Kawee Tanjararak
2017	Club Friday The Series 9 รักครั้งหนึ่ง ที่ไม่ถึงตาย ตอน รักที่หลุดลอย		Korn	Pimmada Boriruksuppakorn; Siripon Yuktadatta	A-TIME MEDIA	GMM 25	Kawee Tanjararak
2018	เมืองมายา Live	Mueng Maya Live The Series	เหมันต์ ชิตณรงค์กุล (เหม); Heman Chitnarongkun (Hem)	Sananthachat Thanapatpisal	The One Enterprise Co, Ltd.	One 31	Worrawech Danuwong
2019	เจ้าหญิงเม็ดทราย	The Sand Princess	คิรากร (คี); Kirakorn (Ki)	Pimchanok Luevisadpaibul	GMMTV	GMM 25	Worrawech Danuwong
2020	Turn Left Turn Right สมองเลี้ยวซ้าย หัวใจเลี้ยวขวา	Turn Left Turn Right			GMMTV	GMM 25	Worrawech Danuwong
2020	Turn Left Turn Right สมองเลี้ยวซ้าย หัวใจเลี้ยวขวา	Turn Left Turn Right	Pat	Ornjira Lamwilai	GMMTV	GMM 25	Kawee Tanjararak

=== Sitcom ===
Year	Thai title	Title	Role	With	ผลิตโดย	Network	Past members
2005-2006	รถด่วนขบวนสุดท้าย		Jio	Wanida Termthanaporn	RS	Channel 9	Kawee Tanjararak
2006	รถด่วนขบวนสุดท้าย ตอน น้องชายตัวแสบ		Alek (รับเชิญ)		RS	Channel 9	Worrawech Danuwong
2006	เพื่อนแซ่บ 4 X 4 ตอน สาวหน้าใสกับนายชอปเปอร์		P'Won (รับเชิญ)		RS	Channel 9	Worrawech Danuwong
2007	บางจะเกร็ง ตอน ผู้หญิงข้าใครอย่าแตะ		Ar-Liow (รับเชิญ)		Lucks 666 Co., Ltd.	Channel 5	Worrawech Danuwong
2007	ระเบิดเถิดเทิง รุ่น 3 ตอน ถ่านไฟเก่ามันร้อน		P'Ciert (รับเชิญ)		Workpoint Entertainment	Channel 5	Worrawech Danuwong
2007	เพื่อนแซ่บ 4 X 4 ตอน...พระเอกในดวงใจ		Wee (รับเชิญ)		RS	Channel 9	Kawee Tanjararak
2011-2012	สุดยอด	Sood Yord	Sood Yord	Marie Eugenie LeLay	Seed Mcot	Channel 9	Worrawech Danuwong
2012	สุดยอด Season 2 ตอน...หลานน้าท้าดวล ตอน...คนในฝัน ตอน...คนโง่ ตอน...จบไปแล้ว ตอน...หนังของเรา		Dr.Phum (รับเชิญ)		Seed 97.5 FM	Channel 9	Kawee Tanjararak
2014	ระเบิดเที่ยงแถวตรง ตอน...หัวใจเต้นแรง		Po.Assawinkraiangkai Chai-rid-i-ya-sa-wan (Dr.Kim) (รับเชิญ)		Workpoint Entertainment	Channel 5	Kawee Tanjararak
2015-16	ระเบิดเถิดเทิงสิงโตทอง		Song		Workpoint Entertainment	Workpoint TV	Kawee Tanjararak

=== Film ===
Year	Thai title	Title	Role	With	Note	ผลิตโดย	Past members	On air
1								
2003	สังหรณ์	Omen					D2B	
1								

=== Master of Ceremony: MC ON TV ===
Year	Thai title	Title	With	ผลิตโดย	Network	Past members	Notes
2006	ไดอารี่สเปเชี่ยล				Channel 3	Worrawech Danuwong; Kawee Tanjararak	
2007	แดนบีม เดอะซีรีส์				Channel 9	Worrawech Danuwong; Kawee Tanjararak	
2009	เชอร์ล็อก โฮล์มส์ ดับแผนพิฆาตโลก ทีวี สเปเชียล				Channel 7	Worrawech Danuwong; Kawee Tanjararak	
2018–present	แดนแพทตี้ Reality		Ungsumalynn Sirapatsakmetha		YouTube:DanPattie TV	Worrawech Danuwong	
2019–present			Atiporn Chitthummawong		YouTube:Beam-Oil Channel	Kawee Tanjararak	
