= Pakphum Wonjinda =

Thai film director, producer and screenwriter (born 1965)

- ภาคภูมิ วงษ์จินดา
- Born: 13 May 1965 (age 61)
- Occupations: Film director; screenwriter
- Years active: 2001–present

Pakphum Wonjinda (Thai: ภาคภูมิ วงษ์จินดา; 13 May 1965) is a Thai film director, producer, screenwriter and CEO of the PAKPHUMJAI Co., Ltd. His first screenplay was for the horror-comedy, Body Jumper, which was based on a Thai ghost folktale. He made his directorial debut in 2004 with the musical-horror-comedy, Formalin Man. He then made the slasher film, Scared in 2005, followed up with another slasher, Video Clip in 2007, Who are you? in 2010, Like and Love in 2012, Pee Kao Pee Ook (2014), The Miror in 3D in 2015, and The Crown in 2016.

Wonjinda also directed the 16 episodes of the crime series Diamond Eyes (Thai: ตาสัมผัสผี, IPA: [taː sam pʰad pʰiː]) in 2017.

== Filmography ==
Year	English title	Thai title	Notes
2001	Body Jumper	Pop weed sayong	Screenwriter only
2004	Formalin Man		
2005	Scared	Rap nawng sayawng khwan	
2007	Video Clip	VDO Clip	
2010	Who are you	?	
2015	The Mirror		
