= Night Mail (2014 film) =

- Directed by: Li Yu
- Starring: Ren Quan; Qiao Renliang; Zhang Yangguoer; Li Yu; Zhou Hong; Cao Yang; Bai Yao
- Release date: 20 June 2014 (China)
- Running time: 90 minutes
- Country: China
- Language: Mandarin
- Box office: $0.95 million (China)

Night Mail (Chinese: 死亡邮件) is a 2014 Chinese crime suspense thriller film directed by Li Yu. It was released on 20 June 2014.

== Cast ==
- Ren Quan
- Qiao Renliang
- Zhang Yangguoer
- Li Yu
- Jessie Zhou
- Cao Yang
- Bai Yao

== Reception ==
The film has grossed $0.95 million in China.
