= Munin Saiprasart =

Thai cartoonist (born 1988)

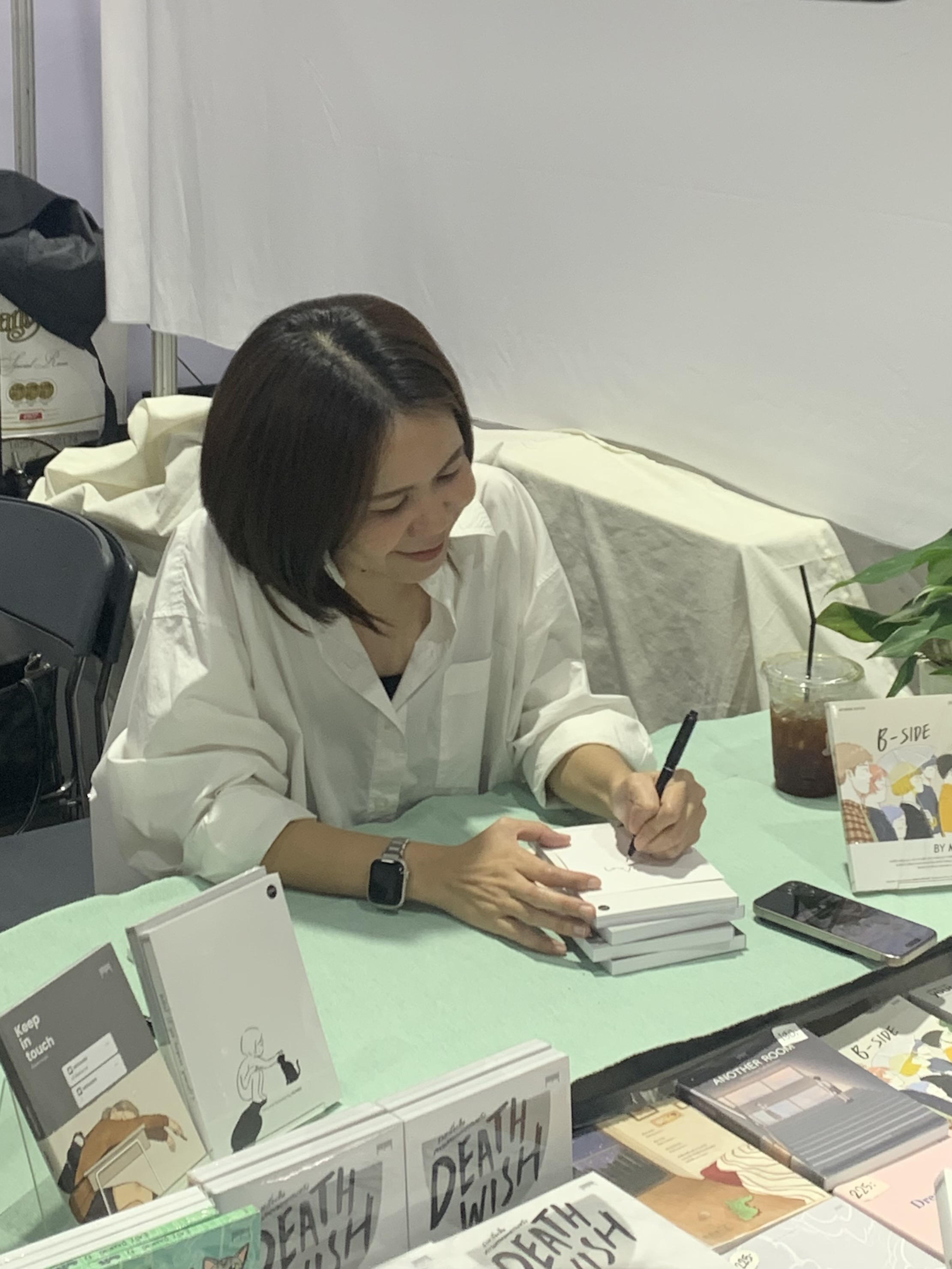
- Munin in 2024
- Born: April 12, 1988 (age 38); Khon Kaen province, Thailand
- Education: Khon Kaen University: Faculty of Architecture
- Occupation: Comics artist

Munin Saiprasart nicknamed May, is a professional cartoonist, well known for her success in the comic industry in Thailand. Her first comic book name is "Munin" from the "Jumaao" publisher. She owns a line drawing design of the music video “Ratreesawat “Good Night”, which is a story of soldiers operating in the three southern border provinces of Thailand.

== Early life ==
Saiprasart was born on April 12, 1988, in Khon Kaen province, Thailand. She graduated from the Faculty of Architecture, Khon Kaen University, and got first honored gold medal. She used to send her drawing to many competitions, which sparked her desire to be a cartoonist. She also received many prizes and awards for her work. While studying she used to draw the cartoon pattern that was copied from the famous comics in that period. Later, she liked to draw Japanese cartoons which she developed her drawing skill. Munin used her friend as a character to draw her cartoon. Many people admired her skill in drawing; she then published her work via YouTube and social network sites. "Jumaao" publisher saw her talent and invited her to write a comic. Presently, she is the owner of '10 Millimeter' which launched with the picture story named “Taeng-Aeng”, and “Prayoke-Sunyaluk”.

== Munin’s comic details ==
"Munin" is a psychological comic book which contains 5 series. In one book of “Munin”, there are around 10 episodes of the cartoons. It is a comic that represents the story of a couple in different perspectives.

Comic Title	Summary
"Rak Lek"	This comic is based on over-confident which results in one-sided love
"Mhar Me Pun Ha"	This comic is about a couple who brings a dog named Boran; later the dog feels curious about the change in his owner's happiness
"Nong Kon Lek"	This story is about three brothers who like different toys, but bring those toys to play together
"Krung Sood Tye"	This story about a boy who studied in entire different level of education, while being pressured by his family. However, later he develops his own attitude toward education in a perspective different from his family
I Sea U	This story is about a photo book that has a story about boy and girl. It contents philosophy about a love which attracted most of the young girl. Illustration is in a cartoon way. 'I Sea You' become famous because it's easy to read and the cartoons were cute

== I Sea You ==
In 2012, Saiprasart drew a comic series called “I Sea You”. This comic series is popular among young teenagers. It is based on a photo book that illustrates the story about the childhood love of a boy and a girl. This book's content is about philosophy of love which attracted most of the young girls in today's generation. It is a book that has the cartoons illustration and love quotes in every single page. I Sea You is famous because of the simple writing style of the author which made it easy for the audience to read and the cartoon characters which were nicely displayed.

The comic composition later was remade in a romantic Thai series I Sea U, which features Ungsumalynn Sirapatsakmetha, Jesse Mekwattana and Bright Vachirawit Chivaaree in main lead. Munin met the cast from the beginning and had various workshops, so that the cast could portray the characters as close as possible to her illustrations in the cartoon.

== Individual work ==
- Good Thursday
- Gray Scale
- I Sea U
- Lovely Man
- Story and Picture
- Pencil
- Self-made
- Symbol Sentence
- A producer of music video “Goodnight” YouTube

== Cooperative work ==
- Love “Gray Road”
- Anything is funny
- Onion “Hear of the Disabled”
- Done Project “Number 23 Tree of a Boy”
- LET's Comic
