= The Mirror (2015 film) =

- Poster
- 魔镜
- Directed by: Pakphum Wonjinda; Sung-ho Kim; Danny Pang
- Written by: Ning Wen; Sung-ho Kim
- Produced by: Kamonwan Khanaraksunti; Kiefer Liu
- Starring: Oscar Sun; Jessie Zhou; Eunsung Kim; Lee Chae-young
- Cinematography: Sander Kamp; Jack Lam; Lin Zejun
- Edited by: Li Yongqin; Wichit Wattananon
- Release date: 25 September 2015 (China)
- Running time: 101 minutes
- Countries: China; South Korea
- Languages: Mandarin; Korean; Thai
- Box office: CN¥9.9 million

The Mirror (Chinese: 魔镜) is a 2015 3D horror thriller film directed by Pakphum Wonjinda, Sung-ho Kim and Danny Pang. A China-South Korea co-production, the film was released in China on 25 September 2015.

== Cast ==
- Oscar Sun
- Jessie Zhou
- Eunsung Kim
- Lee Chae-young

== Reception ==
The film has earned CN¥9.953 million at the Chinese box office.
