= Sririta Jensen Narongdej =

Thai actress and model (born 1981)

- ศรีริต้า เจนเซ่น ณรงค์เดช
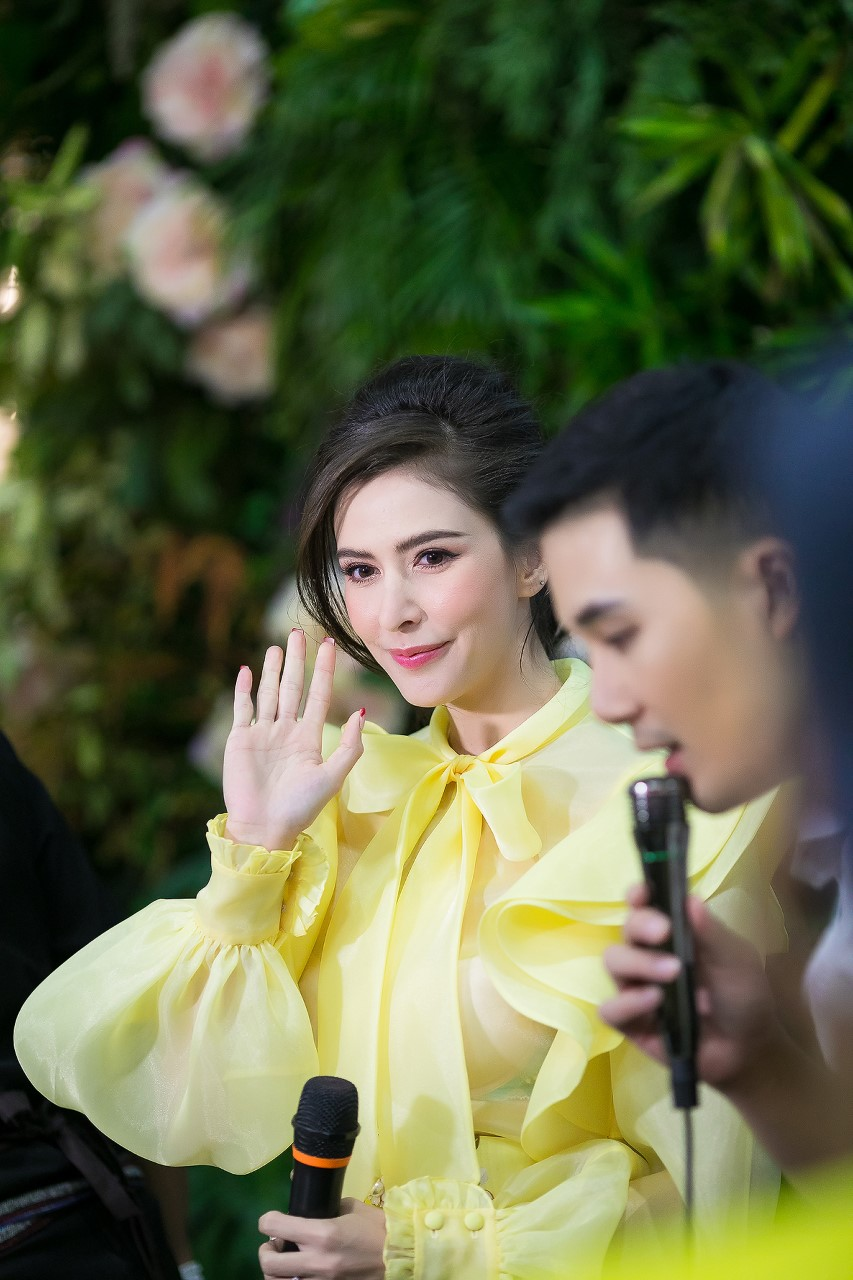
- Jensen in 2019
- Born: Sririta Jensen; 27 October 1981 (age 44); Tanjung Priok, Jakarta, Indonesia
- Other name: Rita
- Education: Bangkok University
- Occupations: Actress; model
- Years active: 1996–present
- Known for: Split Second (TV series) (2004); Forget me not (2014); The Face Thailand (2018)
- Spouse: Korn Narongdej (m. 2020)
- Children: 2
- Website: Official website

Sririta Jensen Narongdej (Thai: ศรีริต้า เจนเซ่น ณรงค์เดช; born 27 October 1981 in Tanjung Priok, Jakarta, Indonesia) is a Thai actress and model.

== Biography ==
Sririta Jensen was born in 1981 in Jakarta. She had a Danish father and a Chinese-Thai mother. Jensen's career began with guest roles on Thai television series. She became more well known in Thailand as a model in various national advertising campaigns and was featured on numerous magazine covers. As an actress, her feature films include 999-9999 and the Television Broadcasts Limited (Hong Kong) series, Split Second.

== Filmography ==
=== Films ===
Films
Year	Title	Role	Notes	With
2002	999-9999	Rainbow	Lead Role	Chulachak Chakrabongse
2004	Xtreme Limit	Sunny	Lead Role	

=== Television ===
Television
Year	Title	English Title	Role	Network	Notes	With
1999	Sapan Dao	Star Bridge	Pu-Pae	Channel 7	Lead Role	Art Supawatt Purdy
2000	Nam Sai Jai Jing	Clear Water, True Heart	Cream	Channel 3	Lead Role	Sarawut Marttong
2004	Karm Fah Chern Kom	Split Second (TV series)	Rita	Channel 3	Main Cast	Chatchai Plengpanich
2004	Kor Wa Ja Mai Ruk	It's Not Love	Pink	Channel 3	Lead Role	Saharat Sangkapreecha
2005	Jan Aey Jun Jao	Oh Moon, Oh Goddess	Jan Jao	Channel 3	Lead Role	Saharat Sangkapreecha
2007	Klin Kaew Klang Jai	Orange Jasmine Scent	Prapai	Channel 3	Lead Role	Patchata Nampan
2007	Sroy Saeng Jan	The Jewel of Bangbod	Duentemduang/Najan (Princess Sisira)	Channel 3	Lead Role	Patchata Nampan
2008	Yuttakarn Huk Karn Thong	Operation Golden Shelf	Porida "Da"	Channel 3	Lead Role	Krissada Pornweroj
2008	Gae Roy Ruk	Trace of Love	Chomduen "Duen" Horapong	Channel 3	Lead Role	Patchata Nampan
2008	Prasart Meud	The Dark Castle	Her Serene Highness Princess Umarangsri Isra	Channel 3	Lead Role	Maurice Legrand
2009	Susarn Phutesuan	Siva Cemetery	Nilpatra "Nilapat" Kraironachit	Channel 3	Lead Role	Nattapol Leeyawanich
2009	Mongkut Saeng Jun	The Moonlight Crown	Princess Sisira	Channel 3	Lead Role	Andrew Gregson
2010	Leum Prai Lai Ruk	Lustrous Design of Love	Nicky/Yanin	Channel 3	Lead Role	Witaya Wasukraipaisarn
2010	Sira Patchara Duang Jai Nak Rope	N/A	Sira Put	Channel 3	Lead Role	Sornram Tappituk
2011	Pim Mala	The Secret Garland Garden	Angel Rampa	Channel 3	Lead Role	None
2012	Buang	Loop	CheunKlin/Rampa	Channel 3	Lead Role	Patchata Nampan
2012	Woon Wai Sabai Dee	N/A	Teacher Nam Thong	Channel 3	Lead Role	Sarawut Marttong
2013	Manee Sawad	Lovely Gem	Naga Devi/UragaDevi(Princess Uraga Na Phu-champasak)	Channel 3	Lead Role	Witaya Wasukraipaisarn
2013	Farm Euy Farm Ruk	N/A	Min-tra	Channel 3	Lead Role	Worrawech Danuwong
2014	Ya Luem Chan	Forget me not	Jeanlong/Jean	Channel 3	Main Cast	Saharat Sangkapreecha
2014	Tang Dern Haeng Ruk	N/A	Sun	Channel 3	Lead Role	Teeradetch Metawarayut
2015	Jao Ban Jao Ruen	Jao Ban Jao Ruen	Prae Kao	Channel 3	Lead Role	Jesdaporn Pholdee
