= Heyman Cheatamee =

Thai film director

Heyman Cheatamee (Thai: เหมันต์ เชตมี) is a Thai film director. His debut film was the horror-comedy Body Jumper in 2001.

== Filmography ==
- Body Jumper (Pop Weed Sayong) (2001)
- Love to Death (Fa Kab Heo) (2003)
- Sexphone & The Lonely Wave (Khluen Ngao Sao Khang Ban) (2003) – co-directed with Chalermpol Bunnag
- Xtreme Limit (Pan X Dek Sood Kua) (2004)
- The Memory (Ruk Jung) (2006)
- Rakna 24 Hours (Rakna 24 Chuamohng) (2007)
