= Singular (band) =

- Origin: Bangkok, Thailand
- Genres: Pop, acoustic, jazz
- Years active: 2010–2013
- Label: Sony Music Entertainment operating (Thailand)
- Past members: Tossaporn Achawanuntakul; Chotiwut Boonyasit
- Website: www.singularband.com

Singular is a band from Thailand. The group includes "Sin" (born on 1 October 1985), a singer-songwriter who has performed with the Bangkok Opera, and "Nut" (born on 12 August 1986), the band's guitarist who won a gold medal at the national guitar awards). Their musical character is likened to the Metro-Acoustic style.

== History ==
In May 2010, Singular released its first ever single "24.7 (Twenty-Four Seven)", which reached number one on top radio charts all over Thailand. The music video for "24.7" also reached 590,000 views after three months on YouTube.

Singular's second single "Bao Bao (Tender)" catapulted the band to greater heights with over four million views on [YouTube. Within two weeks of its release, "Bao Bao" also reached number one on top radio charts all over the Thailand and the phrase "lyric for Bao Bao / Singular" became the sixth most searched phrase on Google Zeitgeist (20–26 September 2010). The song won a number of national music and media awards, including "Song of the Year" and "Best New Acts" for Thailand.

Singular also worked on an international single with the Japanese guitar duo, Depapepe. Their joint single release is called "Some Other Day", which was written by Sin, while incorporating an existing instrumental piece by Depapepe, "Kitto Mata Itsuka".

== Discography ==
=== Albums ===
==== 2011 The White Room -Decoration- (Peak Chart Position 1) ====
1. ONE
2. Try
3. เบาเบา (Tender)
4. GAME
5. Days
6. More
7. 24.7 (Twenty four Seven)
8. Worless
9. FADE
10. Some Other Day feat. Depapepe
11. 24.7 (acoustic) (bonus track)

=== EPs ===
==== 2010 The White Room ====
1. 24.7 (Twenty four Seven)
2. ลอง (Try)
3. เบาเบา (Tender)
4. Game
5. อีกวัน (Days)
6. Faded.acoustic
7. 24.7 (acoustic)

=== Singles ===
==== 2010 ====
Single	Peak Chart Position
24.7 (Twenty-Four Seven)	3
Bao Bao (Tender)	1

==== 2011 ====
Single	Peak Chart Position
Long (Try)	1
ONE	1
Some Other Day feat. Depapepe	5
Niran (Constantly)	TBA

=== DVD ===
2011 The White Room -decoration-

=== Others ===
==== 2011 ====
- Lom Nhao (Jazz Version) – Compilation album ‘Bossa in Love’

(Peak Chart position referenced from National Top Charts)

== Awards ==
- ‘Most Favorite Song’ for 'Bao Bao (Tender)' FAT Awards 2011
- ‘Best Art Direction’ for ‘24.7’ Channel [V] Thailand Music Video Awards 2011
- ‘Popular New Artist’ Channel [V] Thailand Music Video Awards 2011
- 'No.1 Music Chart (May) 2011' for 'ONE' by Intensive Watch
- 'Song of The Year' for 'Bao Bao (Tender)' by Bang Awards 2011
- 'Lyric of The Year' for 'Bao Bao (Tender)' by Bang Awards 2011
- 'Group/Duo of The Year' by Bang Awards 2011
- 'No.1 Music Chart 2010' for 'Bao Bao (Tender)' by Intensive Watch
- 'Song of The Year' for 'Bao Bao (Tender)' by Nine Entertain Awards 2011
- 'Group/Duo Artist of The Year' by Nine Entertain Awards 2011
- 'Most Popular Song of The Year' for 'Bao Bao (Tender)' by Seed Awards 2011
- 'Best Group/Duo Artist' by Seed Awards 2011
- 'Best Newcomer Artist' by Seed Awards 2011
- 'Most Click Music Video' by You2Play Awards 2011
- 'Top Talk-about in Music' by MThai Awards 2011
- 'Greatz Group' by VirginHitz Awards 2012
