= Jessie Zhou =

Chinese actress and model

Zhou Hong
- 周泓
- Born: Zhou Hong; May 4, 1987 (age 38); Suzhou, China
- Years active: 2009-present

Zhou Hong (Chinese: 周泓; born 4 May 1987), or Jessie Zhou, is a Chinese actress and model.

== Career ==
Zhou made her acting debut in famous TV commercials of Head&Shoulders of P&G, Pepsi, Nokia, KFC, Wrigley, and many other major brands, television series Wen Rou de Huang Yan (温柔的谎言), and later received recognition for her memorable roles in various movies and television series including Beijing Love Story (北京爱情故事), My Economical Man (我的经济适用男), In Love with Power (美人无泪), Legend of Lu Zhen (陆贞传奇), Obstetrician (产科医生), Love Deposit (爱情银行), Night Mail (死亡邮件), and The Mirror (魔镜3D).

== Filmography ==
=== Films ===
Year	English title	Chinese title	Role
2010	Legend of the Fist：The Return of Chen Zhen	精武风云	Yi Tai (姨太)
2011	Rushed Wedding	婚礼告急	Hu Tian Qi(胡天琪)
2013	Love Deposit	爱情银行	Yu Xiao Yu(余小鱼)
2014	Night Mail	死亡邮件	Xiao Lu (小璐)
2014	The Mirror	魔镜3D	Jenny (珍妮)

=== Television series ===
Year	English name	Chinese name	Role
2011	Tender Lie	温柔的谎言	Yang Tao (杨桃)
2012	Beijing Love Story	北京爱情故事	Xue Er (雪儿)
2012	In Love with Power	美人无泪	Fei Cui (翡翠)
2012	My Economical Man	我的经济适用男	Wen Xin (文心)
2012	Legend of Lu Zhen	陆贞传奇	Wu Xiu (吴绣)
2014	Obstetrician	产科医生	Qu Lan (曲兰)
