= Worrawech Danuwong =

Thai actor, singer and producer (born 1984)

Dan Worrawech
- วรเวช ดานุวงศ์
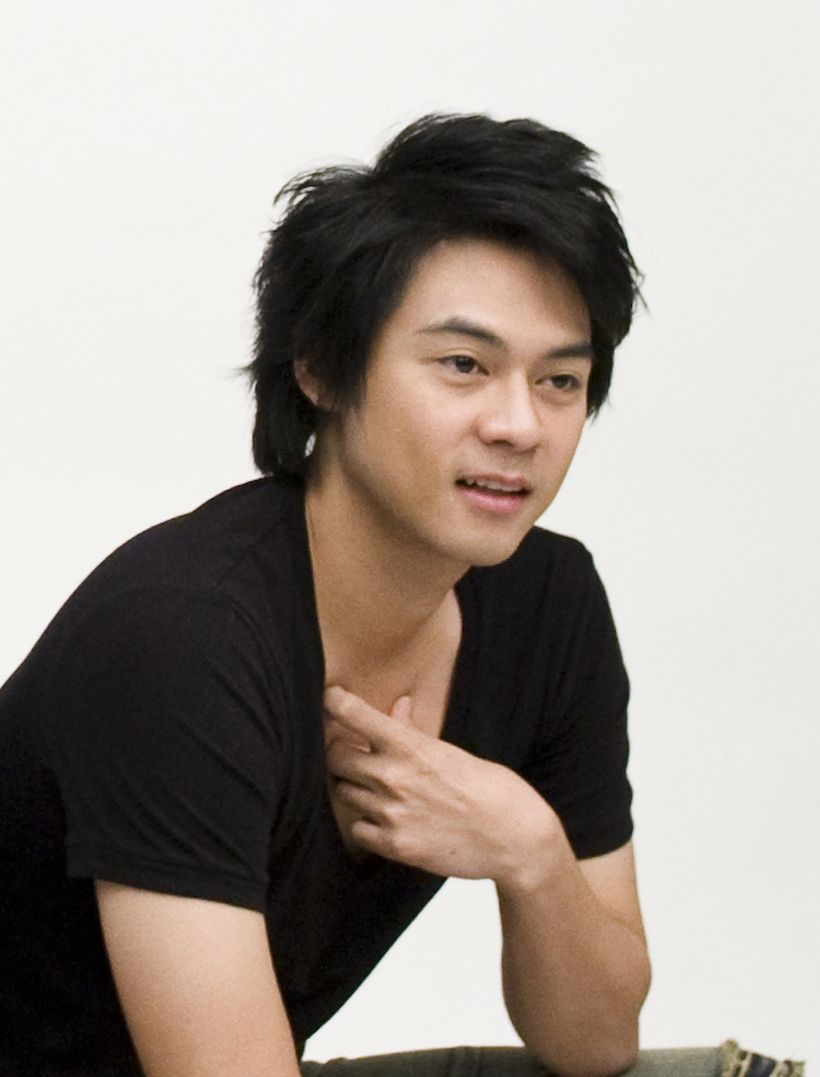
- Born: Worrawech Danuwong; 16 May 1984 (age 42); Suphan Buri, Thailand
- Occupations: Actor; producer; host; singer
- Years active: 2001–present
- Spouse: Ungsumalynn Sirapatsakmetha (m. 2022)
- Children: 2
- Musical career
- Also known as: Dan D2B
- Genres: Thai pop
- Labels: RS (2000–2008); Sony (2008–2013); True4U (2015–present)
- Formerly of: D2B

Signature
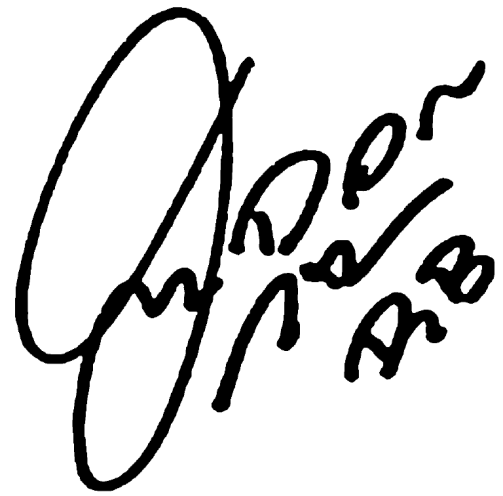

Worrawech Danuwong (Thai: วรเวช ดานุวงศ์, RTGS: Worawet Danuwong; born 16 May 1984), nicknamed Dan (Thai: แดน), is a Thai singer and actor, who was a member of Thai boy band, D2B. He graduated with a bachelor's degree in audio engineering from Rangsit University.

== Biography ==
Worrawech Danuwong is a former member of the boy band D2B, which was very popular in Thailand. Dan entered a singing contest "Star Challenge 2000" applied by RS Promotion, and that was his first and important step of leading him to stardom, and become a member of D2B. He also uses WD as his stage name for his solo career as a singer. D2B is one of Thailand's most famous boy band groups. However, on 22 July 2003, a member of D2B, Big, got into a car accident and being in a coma state. During Big's years while being sick, Dan and Beam continued their music careers and released several duo albums together. The duo became known as Dan Beam. One of his most famous songs included "Wela Mai Keuy Por" (Not Enough Time, เวลาไม่เคยพอ).

After the contract with RS was ended in October 2008, Dan decided not to renew and left RS entertainment business. He decided to sign a contract with Sony Music (Thailand) for 5 years.

== Music career ==
Dan continued his solo career under Sony Music after leaving RS company. On 17 October 2008, a press conference was held at Dhusit Thani Hotel for his comeback and upcoming new album, which was expected to be released in 2009. He stated that Sony Music is a company where he can work for and allow freedom to collaborate with other companies in music and in acting as he wanted a new experience to further his career especially in music composing. He also highlighted that he didn't have any problems with his former company and was ready to work again any time in the future. In his interview during the press conference, he admitted that he felt stressed in making his decision since he had been working at his old company for 6–7 years. Thinking that his decision would be a change for his life, he made the best decision possible and had discussed it with his family.

His first solo album named "Blue" was released on 27 July 2009, and the press conference was held on 4 August 2009. The second album "Solo Motion" was released in 2011.

== Production ==
Dan Worrawech Danuwong, turned behind the scenes to produce quality series and became a full-time drama organizer. He invested in a new drama named I.Sea.U, an adaptation of a famous comic book composition by a cartoonist Munin Saiprasart. The series was primarily shot near the seaside, underwater or submerge. The series was developed by his production house named "Lasercat Studio". The series opening OST was sung by Pattie Ungsumalynn Sirapatsakmetha, his current wife.

== Personal life ==
He has been in a relationship with Ungsumalynn Sirapatsakmetha. He met her since 2009 in a drama filming. He proposed to her in September 2022 and they got married in November 2022. They have a son and a daughter, both fraternal twins born in 2024.

== Discography ==
=== D2B ===
- 2001 - D2B
- 2002 - D2B Summer
- 2003 - D2B Type II
- 2004 - D2B The Neverending Album Tribute To Big D2B

=== Dan-Beam ===
- 2005 - Dan-Beam The Album
- 2006 - Dan-Beam The Album II Relax
- 2007 - Dan-Beam The Album 3 Freedom
- 2007 - DB2B (Dan Beam To Big)

=== Dan WD (Solo Album) ===
- 2009 - Blue
- 2011 - Solo Motion

=== Others ===
- 2002 - TV Soundtrack : Wai-Rai-Freshy (วัยร้ายเฟรชชี่)
- 2004 - Special Album : The Messages - Various Artists
- 2006 - Movie Soundtrack : Noodles Boxer (แสบสนิท ศิษย์ส่ายหน้า)
- 2009 - Movie Soundtrack : 32 December Love Error (32 ธันวา) - 2 Tracks
- 2011 - Movie Soundtrack : Bangkok Sweety
- 2011 - Movie Soundtrack : The Melody

== Filmography ==
=== Films ===
- 2003 - Omen (Sung Horn : สังหรณ์)
- 2006 - Noodles Boxer (แสบสนิท ศิษย์ส่ายหน้า)
- 2009 - Phobia 2 (Ha Praeng : 5 แพร่ง)
- 2009 - 32 December Love Error (32 ธันวา)
- 2011 - Bangkok Sweety
- 2011 - The Melody
- 2012 - Valentine Sweety
- 2012 - Sat2mon
- 2014 - The One Ticket (ตัวพ่อเรียกพ่อ)

=== Television Series (Lakorn) ===
- 2002 - Wai-Rai-Freshy (วัยร้ายเฟรชชี่)
- 2004 - Koo-Kam 2 (คู่กรรม 2)
- 2005 - Pee-Nong-Song-Luead (พี่น้อง 2 เลือด)
- 2005 - Hoi-An-Chun-Ruk-Ther (ฮอยอัน ฉันรักเธอ)
- 2005 - Nai-Kra-Jork (นายกระจอก)
- 2006 - Mon-Ruk-Lottery (มนต์รักล็อตเตอรี่)
- 2006 - Pee-Chai (พี่ชาย)
- 2007 - Poot-Ruk-Na-Mo (ภูตรักนะโม)
- 2007 - Pee-Kaew-Nang-Hong (ปี่แก้วนางหงส์)
- 2009 - Spy The Series (สายลับเดอะซีรี่ส์ กับ 24 คดีสุดห้ามใจ)
- 2010 - Ku-Larb-Sorn-Narm (กุหลาบซ่อนหนาม)
- 2010 - Sueb-suan-puan-rak (สืบสวนป่วนรัก)
- 2011 - Sud-Yod (สุดยอด)
- 2013 - ฟาร์มเอ๋ย ฟาร์มรัก

== MC ==
Television

- 2006 : รายการพิเศษ "ไดอารี่สเปเชี่ยล" On Air Channel 3
- 2007 : "แดนบีม เดอะซีรีส์" On Air Channel 9
- 2009 : รายการพิเศษ "เชอร์ล็อก โฮล์มส์ ดับแผนพิฆาตโลก ทีวี สเปเชียล" On Air Channel 7

Online

- 2018 : แดนแพทตี้ Reality On Air YouTube:DanPattie TV
