= Ungsumalynn Sirapatsakmetha =

Thai actress and model (born 1991)

- อังศุมาลิน สิรภัทรศักดิ์เมธา
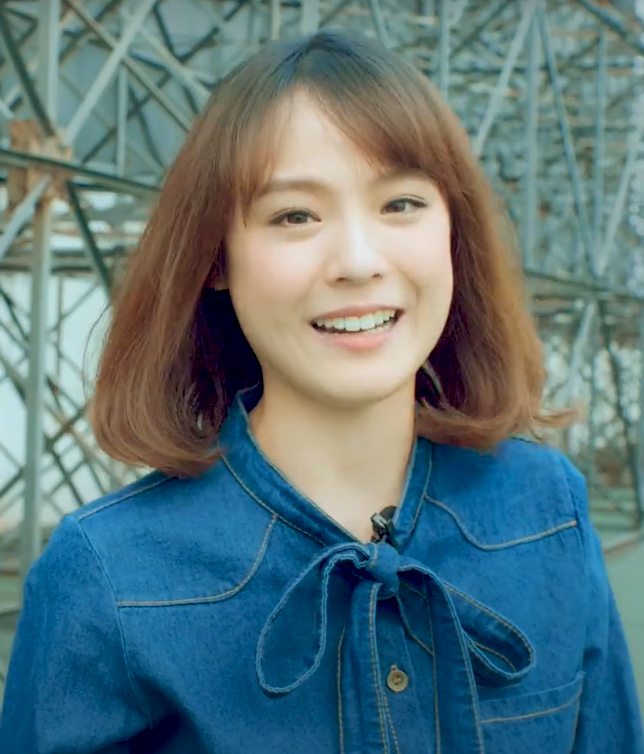
- Born: Ungsumalynn Sirapatsakmetha; 13 July 1991 (age 35); Bangkok, Thailand
- Other name: Pattie
- Education: Bachelor of Communication Arts (SAE Institute Bangkok)
- Occupations: Actress; Model
- Years active: 2008–present
- Height: 1.65 m (5 ft 5 in)
- Spouse: Worrawech Danuwong (m. 2022)
- Children: 2

Signature
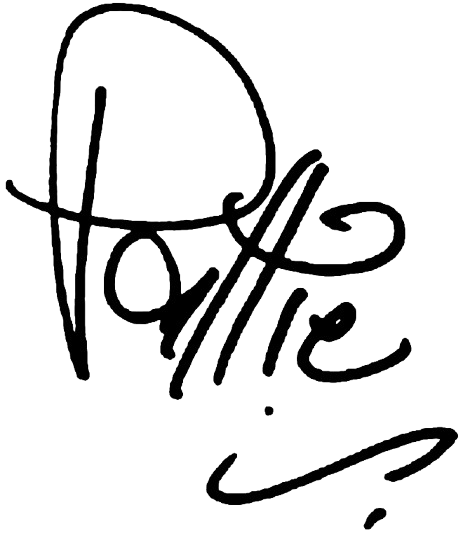

Ungsumalynn Sirapatsakmetha (Thai: อังศุมาลิน สิรภัทรศักดิ์เมธา, RTGS: Angsumalin Siraphatsakmetha; born 13 July 1991), nicknamed Pattie (Thai: แพทตี้), is a Thai film and television actress and model. She has starred in many films and television series such as Hormones (2008), Bangkok Traffic (Love) Story (2009), Hormones: The Series (2013–2014), Princess Hours (2017), I Sea U (2018), and Fleet of Time (2019).

== Early life and education ==
Born in Bangkok, Thailand, Pattie has one elder brother and two elder sisters. She has a Chinese ancestry.

Pattie attended primary school at Sacred Heart Convent school although she is Buddhist. During high school at Convent of the Infant Jesus, in Bangkok, her concentration was Business Chinese. Pattie was a cheerleader and class leader who enjoyed participating in extracurricular activities including sports. Her favorite sports are badminton and wakeboarding. She graduated with a bachelor's degree of communication arts, majoring in digital film making at SAE Institute Bangkok.

== Personal life ==
She has been in a relationship with Worrawech Danuwong whom she met since a 2009 TV series. He proposed to her in September 2022 and they got married in November 2022. They have a son and a daughter, both fraternal twins born in 2024.

== Discography ==
Year	Title	Series	Channel	Ref.
2018	Throw, Throw, Release (เพลง โยน ทิ้ง ปล่อย)	I Sea U	Lasercat Studio	

== Filmography ==
=== Film ===
Year	Title	Role	Notes	Ref.
2008	Hormones	Nana	Main role	
2008	SHE	Prae	Short film	
2009	Best of Times	Pet owner	Supporting role	
2009	Bangkok Traffic (Love) Story	Plern	Supporting role	
2010	Pattie & The Swollen	Pattie	Short film	
2011	Bangkok Sweety	Matae	Supporting role	
2012	Valentine Sweety	Matae	Supporting role	
2012	Seven Something	Cheerleader	Guest role	
2012	Sat2Mon	Pheng (Duonpheng)	Main role	
2014	Find Someone Special	Fai	Main role, short film	

=== Television series ===
Year	Title	Role	Notes	Ref.
2008	Moradok Bunterng	Plern	Guest role	
2009	Spy The Series (Sai Lab the Series)	Amm	Main role	
2010	Hua Jai Ploy Jone		Supporting role	
2013	Carabao		Main role	
2013-2015	Hormones: The Series	Khongkwan "Kwan" Dilokthamsakul	Main role (Season 1–2); Guest role (Season 3)	
2014	Naruk	Lolita	Main role	
2015	Stupid Cupid	Araya Wiwatthananonth	Main role	
2015	Torfun Kub Marvin	Torfun Boonyapat	Main role	
2015	Love Flight	Plaifah / "Fah"	Main role	
2017	Lost in Kiriwong	Nam	Main role	
2017	Princess Hours	Crown Princess Kaning	Main role	
2018	I Sea U	Talay	Main role	
2018	Ngao	Charoenkwan	Main role	
2019	Fleet of Time	Fang	Main role	
2019	Sapai TKO	Rakfah	Main role	

== Awards and nominations ==
Year	Award	Category	Nominated work	Result	Ref.
2009	Top Awards 2008	Best Breakout Actress	Hormones	Nominated	
2010	Top Awards 2009	Best Breakout Movie Actress	Bangkok Traffic (Love) Story	Won	
2010	Star Entertainment Awards 2010	Best Supporting Actress	Bangkok Traffic (Love) Story	Nominated	
2010	7th Hamburger Awards	Best Supporting Actress	Bangkok Traffic (Love) Story	Nominated	
2010	Kazz Awards 2010	Favorite Actress	—N/a	Won	
