= Apichet Kittikorncharoen =

Thai singer (1982–2007)

Panrawat Kittikorncharoen
- อภิเชษฐ์ กิตติกรเจริญ
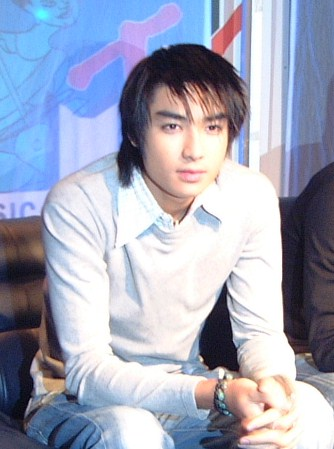
- Born: Apichet Kittikorncharoen; 2 December 1982; Samut Prakan, Thailand
- Died: 9 December 2007 (aged 25); Siriraj Hospital
- Occupations: Actor; model; singer
- Years active: 2000–2003
- Height: 1.82 m (6 ft 0 in)
- Musical career
- Also known as: Big D2B
- Genre: Thai pop
- Instruments: Guitar; vocals
- Label: RS (2000 - 2003)

Apichet Kittikorncharoen (Thai: อภิเชษฐ์ กิตติกรเจริญ; RTGS: Aphichet Kittikoncharoen, name later changed to Panrawat (ปาณรวัฐ), 2 December 1982 – 9 December 2007) was a Thai singer known under the stage name Big D2B. He studied film at Bangkok University and was part of RS Promotion's trio boy band D2B.

On 22 July 2003, a car accident in which he fell into a polluted Bangkok khlong (canal) resulted in severe brain infection with multiple organisms including the fungus known as Scedosporium (ex. Pseudoalleschia) boydii, which, despite efforts to treat him including four brain operations and medicine flown in from Australia, caused extensive damage to his brain. He remained in coma for four years before finally dying on 9 December 2007. Apichet's case, which saw throngs of fans hoping and praying for him at the hospital as well as intense media attention, helped raise awareness about the hazardous nature of Bangkok's water pollution. His funeral was held for 100 days from the end of 2007 to March of the next year, and was patronised by Queen Sirikit.
