= Good Old Days (Thai TV series) =

2022 Thai television series

- Official series poster
- Original title: th
- Genre: Romance; Drama; Slice of Life
- Created by: GMMTV; Watthana Rujirojsakul
- Written by: Supalerk Ningsanon
- Screenplay by: Waasuthep Ketpetch
- Directed by: Pattaraporn Werasakwong
- Starring: Perawat Sangpotirat; Vachirawit Chivaaree; Tawan Vihokratana; Kanyawee Songmuang; Way-Ar Sangngern; Metawin Opas-iamkajorn; Chanikarn Tangkabodee; Yongwaree Anilbol
- Opening theme: Good Old Days by Krist Perawat
- Country of origin: Thailand
- Original language: Thai
- No. of seasons: 1
- No. of episodes: 12

Production
- Executive producers: Patha Thongpan; Sataporn Panichraksapong; Kamthorn Lorjitramnuay; Puchong Tuntisungwaragul
- Producer: GMMTV
- Cinematography: Danuwat Jettana; Wongwattana Chunhavuttiyanon
- Running time: 50 minutes
- Production companies: GMMTV; Parbdee Tawesuk

Original release
- Network: GMM 25
- Release: 10 August – 15 September 2022

Good Old Days (Thai: ร้านซื้อขายความทรงจำ), is romance, slice of life and drama based series starring Perawat Sangpotirat (Krist), Vachirawit Chivaaree (Bright), Tawan Vihokratana (Tay), Kanyawee Songmuang (Thanaerng), Way-Ar Sangngern (Joss), Metawin Opas-iamkajorn (Win), Chanikarn Tangkabodee (Prim) & Yongwaree Anilbol (Fah). It is produced by GMMTV and Bom Watthana Rujirojsakul, directed by Waasuthep Ketpetch and Pattaraporn Werasakwong. The series consists of six short stories – anthologies, based on graphic novels written by Tanis Weerasakwong (Sa-ard). It was announced by GMMTV during the "Borderless" event on 1 December 2021. It premiered on Disney+ Hotstar, Thailand.

== Synopsis ==
All stories hover around a unique antique shop, where a buyer purchases the item based on its hidden value and not based on its material value. This he decides after he listens to the seller's narrative. The theme of these 6 stories are based on bonding, happiness, regrets, dreams, sadness and memories. Each item sold in this antique shop has a background, and the worth is gauged based on the depth of the feelings and sentiments related to it. Person who sells their object, can reminisce how valuable the item meant in their lives.

== Releases ==
Disney + Hotstar, Thailand have distribution rights, and have launched the series every Wednesday and Thursday at 18:00 (ICT) from 10 August 2022, and was broadcast on CS TV Asahi CS TeleAsa Channel 1 in Japanese Television station and on Japanese streaming platform Telasa. It is produced by GMMTV, and co-produced by Kamthorn Lorjitramnuay, Puchong Tuntisungwaragul and Patha Thongpa representing Parbdee production house.

== Soundtrack ==
Opening title "Good Old Days" is sung by Perawat Sangpotirat and the OST "Good Times" is sung by Vachirawit Chivaaree along with Thanaerng Kanyawee. Both the song got launched on GMMTV Records and was well received by the general public.

| Year | Title | Artist | Channel | Ref. |
|---|---|---|---|---|
| 2022 | "Good Old Days" OST (ร้านซื้อขายความทรงจำ) | Krist Perawat Sangpotirat | GMMTV Records | |
| 2022 | "Good Time" (ระหว่างทาง); Story 4: Our Soundtrack | Vachirawit Chivaaree and Kanyawee Songmuang | GMMTV Records | |

== Cast and characters ==
=== Main ===
| Episode | Cast | Notes |
|---|---|---|
| 1 & 2 | Phu: Thanat Lowkhunsombat (Lee); Mint: Yongwaree Anilbol (Fah) | Phu dealing to overcome his wounds of the past and his current situation with the girl he met. |
| 3 & 4 | Jap: Tawan Vihokratana (Tay); Wut: Pathompong Reonchaidee (Toy); Piang: Sarunchana Apisamaimongkol (Aye) | Complexity of love triangle and memories of friendship. |
| 5 & 6 | Bomb: Way-Ar Sangngern (Joss); Got: Kay Lertsittichai; Kai: Tipnaree Weerawatnodom (Namtan) | During journey in their mother's old car, Kai and Got deal with their past trauma, and seek an answer to an unresolved issue. |
| 7 & 8 | Tong: Vachirawit Chivaaree (Bright); Gyb: Kanyawee Songmuang (Thanaerng) | Childhood friends promising each other to become great singers when they grow up and have grand stage performance together. |
| 9 & 10 | Maew: Metawin Opas-iamkajorn (Win); Mew: Chayanit Chansangavej (Pat) | Post engagement, lovers struggles to cop with their differences in status. |
| 11 & 12 | Hey: Perawat Sangpotirat (Krist); Mai: Chanikarn Tangkabodee (Prim) | Hey waiting for his gaming friend, Mai who suddenly disappeared one day. |

=== Supporting and guest appearance ===
| Episode | Story Title | Supporting cast | Guest Role |
|---|---|---|---|
| 1 & 2 | Bond and Relationship | Phu's Mother: Penpak Sirikul (Tai); Bartender: Chinnarat Siriphongchawalit (Mike); Phu's neighbour: Methika Jiranorraphat (Jane) | |
| 3 & 4 | Memory of Happiness | Pete: Metas Opas-iamkajorn (Mick); Piang's Father: Thanongsak Suphakan (Nong) | |
| 5 & 6 | Road to Regret | Ton: Ratthanant Janyajirawong (Ter); Ging (Kai & Got's Mother): Pintira Singhaseem (Tonaoy); Ging's Sister Tai: Ratchanee Boonyatharokul; Ging's Sister Lek: Nipawan Taveepornsawan (Kai); Ging's Brother Song: Boonsong Nakphoo (Sueb) | |
| 7 & 8 | Our Soundtrack | Hua: Phanuroj Chalermkijporntavee (Pepper); Guy: Sivakorn Lertchuchot (Guy) | |
| 9 & 10 | Love WIns | Chaianan: Leo Saussay; Miw Mew's older sister: Phatchara Tubthong (Kapook); Pang: Bhasidi Petchsutee (Lookjun); Jang: Neen Suwanamas; Maew workmate A: Chayapol Jutamas (AJ); Maew workmate Meng: Tharatorn Jantharaworakarn (Boom); Ink: Benyapa Jeenprasom (View); Nat: Jirawat Sutivanichsak (Dew); F: Jirakit Thawornwong (Mek) | |
| 11 & 12 | Somewhere Only We Belong | Hey's Grandfather: Sombat Metanee; Mai's Father: Sornchai Chatwiriyachai (Chua) | |

== Viewership ratings and ranking ==
=== Average TV viewership ratings ===
- The blue number represents the lowest ratings and the red number represents the highest ratings in Thailand.

| Episode | Title | Original Broadcast Date | Average Audience Share |
|---|---|---|---|
| —N/a | Good Old Days Soft Opening | August 4, 2022 | 0.051% |
| 1 | Bond and Relationship | August 10, 2022 | 0.012% |
| 2 | Bond and Relationship | August 11, 2022 | 0.027% |
| 3 | Memory of Happiness | August 17, 2022 | 0.082% |
| 4 | Memory of Happiness | August 18, 2022 | 0.164% |
| 5 | Road to Regret | August 24, 2022 | 0.018% |
| 6 | Road to Regret | August 25, 2022 | 0.025% |
| 7 | Our Soundtrack | August 31, 2022 | 0.029% |
| 8 | Our Soundtrack | September 1, 2022 | 0.058% |
| 9 | Love Wins | September 7, 2022 | 0.045% |
| 10 | Love Wins | September 8, 2022 | 0.019% |
| 11 | Somewhere Only We Belong | September 14, 2022 | 0.024% |
| 12 | Somewhere Only We Belong | September 15, 2022 | 0.073% |
| Average | | 0.041% | |

^1Based on the average audience share per episode.

== Awards ==
| Year | Award | Category | Result | Ref. |
|---|---|---|---|---|
| 2023 | Asian Academy Creative Awards 2023 | Best Drama Series | Won | |
