= Turn Left Turn Right (TV series) =

2020 Thai television series

- Official series poster
- Thai: Turn Left Turn Right – สมองเลี้ยวซ้าย หัวใจเลี้ยวขวา
- Genre: Romantic fantasy; Drama
- Created by: GMMTV
- Based on: Turn Left, Turn Right (A Chance of Sunshine) by Jimmy Liao
- Directed by: Worrawech Danuwong
- Starring: Kawee Tanjararak; Prachaya Ruangroj; Korapat Kirdpan; Ornjira Lamwilai; Chayanit Chansangavej; Napasorn Weerayuttvilai
- Opening theme: "Second Chance" by Singto Numchok
- Country of origin: Thailand
- Original language: Thai
- No. of episodes: 10

Production
- Executive producer: Sataporn Panichraksapong
- Editor: Parbdee Tawesuk
- Running time: 45 minutes
- Production companies: GMMTV; Lasercat Studio

Original release
- Network: GMM 25; LINE TV
- Release: 2 February – 5 April 2020

Turn Left Turn Right (Thai: Turn Left Turn Right – สมองเลี้ยวซ้าย หัวใจเลี้ยวขวา; Turn Left Turn Right – Sa-mong Liao Sai. Hua-chai Liao Khwa) is a 2020 Thai television series adaptation of the illustrated book Turn Left, Turn Right (A Chance of Sunshine) by Taiwanese author Jimmy Liao. The series stars Kawee Tanjararak (Beam), Prachaya Ruangroj (Singto), Korapat Kirdpan (Nanon), Ornjira Lamwilai (Pang), Chayanit Chansangavej (Pat), and Napasorn Weerayuttvilai (Puimek).

Directed by Worrawech Danuwong and produced by GMMTV together with Lasercat Studio, the series was one of the thirteen television series launched by GMMTV in their "Wonder Th13teen" event on 5 November 2018. Originally scheduled for 2019 release, it premiered on GMM 25 and LINE TV on 2 February 2020, airing on Sundays at 21:30 ICT and 23:00 ICT, respectively. The series concluded on 5 April 2020.

== Synopsis ==
Tai dreams of being a sculptor, but he is torn between his parents' wishes for him to study marketing and his girlfriend Sangnuea's desire for them to study the same subject together. He must choose between meeting others' expectations and following his dreams.

Meanwhile, a young musician named Gun, who is waiting for his true love, crosses paths with Aye. While their relationship is going well, Gun is faced with the choice of leaving his old life behind and moving to Taiwan with Aye.

When Pat learns that his long-time friend Tisha is going to marry someone else, he is devastated. He later discovers that Tisha had been in an accident and experienced a temporary loss of memory. She thought she was dating Pat, but what she remembers is false. Still, he decides to return her to her real boyfriend.

The three of them are faced with their own problems until they find themselves in a mysterious bar called Somewhere Only We Know. The owner, Tor, offers them a second chance to turn back time and make a different choice: to follow their heart or listen to their head. Whatever choice they make, their lives will never be the same.

== Cast and characters ==
Below are the cast of the series:

=== Main ===
- Kawee Tanjararak (Beam) as Pat
- Prachaya Ruangroj (Singto) as Gun
- Korapat Kirdpan (Nanon) as Tai
- Ornjira Lamwilai (Pang) as Tisha
- Chayanit Chansangavej (Pat) as Aye
- Napasorn Weerayuttvilai (Puimek) as Earn

=== Supporting ===
- Phatchatorn Tanawat (Ployphach) as Cher
- Wanwimol Jaenasavamethee (June) as Sangnuea
- Singto Numchok as Tor
- Anusorn Maneeted (Young) as Gab
- Danai Jarujinda (Kik) as Jay
- Patara Eksangkul (Foei) as Sun
- Pattadon Janngeon (Fiat) as James
- Chayapol Jutamas (AJ)
- Napat Patcharachavalit (Aun)

=== Guest role ===
- Poramet Noi-um as Tai's father
- Mintita Wattanakul (Mint) as Nym
- Leo Saussay as Patrick
- Carissa Springett as Khim
- Supakan Benjaarruk (Nok) as Jessie

== Soundtrack ==
- "Second Chance" by Singto Numchok

== Reception ==
=== Thailand television ratings ===
- In the table below, the blue number represents the lowest ratings and the red number represents the highest ratings.

Episode No.	Timeslot (UTC+07:00)	Air date	Average audience share	Ref.
1	Sunday 9:30 pm	2 February 2020	0.147%	
2	Sunday 9:30 pm	9 February 2020	0.150%	
3	Sunday 9:30 pm	16 February 2020	0.057%	
4	Sunday 9:30 pm	23 February 2020	0.143%	
5	Sunday 9:30 pm	1 March 2020	0.105%	
6	Sunday 9:30 pm	8 March 2020	0.135%	
7	Sunday 9:30 pm	15 March 2020	0.049%	
8	Sunday 9:30 pm	22 March 2020	0.113%	
9	Sunday 9:30 pm	29 March 2020	0.074%	
10	Sunday 9:30 pm	5 April 2020	0.110%	
Average			0.108% ^{1}	

^1 Based on the average audience share per episode.

== Awards and nominations ==
Award	Year	Category	Recipient(s) and nominee(s)	Result	Ref.
Maya Awards	2020	Male Star	Prachaya Ruangroj	Pending	
