= Sarunchana Apisamaimongkol =

Thai actress and singer (born 2000)

- สรัลชนา อภิสมัยมงคล
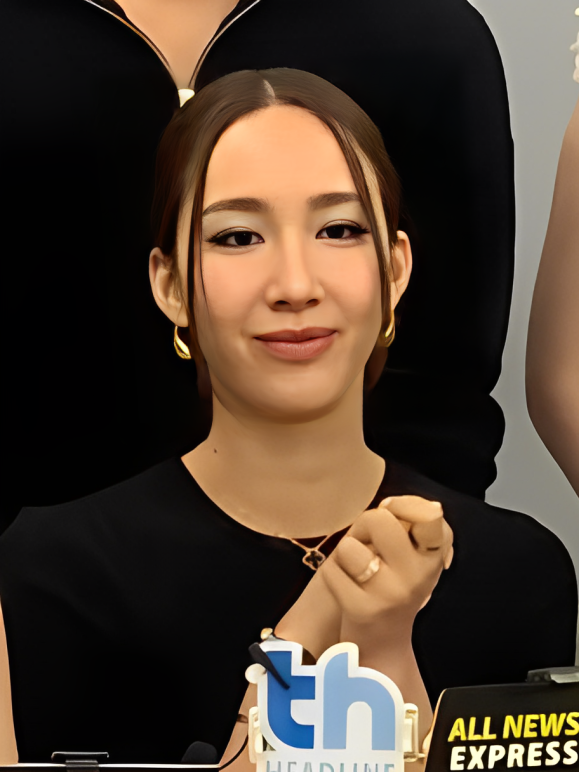
- Sarunchana in June 2025
- Born: 25 March 2000 (age 26); Bangkok, Thailand
- Other name: Aye (อ้าย)
- Education: Chulalongkorn University
- Occupations: Actress; singer; model
- Years active: 2015–present
- Agent: GMMTV (2018–2026)
- Known for: Amm in Friend Zone and Friend Zone 2: Dangerous Area; Liz in Boy For Rent; Saras in P.S. I Hate You
- Spouse: Boonpaween Boonmechote (m. 2025)
- Musical career
- Genre: T-pop
- Instrument: Vocals
- Labels: GMMTV Records; Riser Music
- Formerly of: Sizzy

Sarunchana Apisamaimongkol (Thai: สรัลชนา อภิสมัยมงคล; born 25 March 2000), nicknamed Aye (Thai: อ้าย), is a Thai actress and singer. She is a former member of the girl group Sizzy under Riser Music. She is known for her starring roles in GMMTV's Friend Zone (2018) and its sequel Friend Zone 2: Dangerous Area, as well as the television series Boy For Rent (2019) and P.S. I Hate You (2022).

== Personal life and education ==
Sarunchana was born in Bangkok, Thailand, on 25 March 2000. She completed her secondary education at Assumption College Thonburi and later graduated with a bachelor's degree from the Faculty of Communication Arts (International Program) at Chulalongkorn University. In September 2025, she reportedly held a private wedding ceremony in Bangkok with her longtime partner, Boonpaween Boonmechote.

== Career ==
Sarunchana entered the entertainment industry as a contestant in the 2013 Young Model Contest hosted by Channel 7, where she finished as the first runner-up and won Miss B-ing Bodyline. She subsequently made her acting debut in Channel 3's Sud Kaen Saen Rak (2015).

After appearing in several television series, she landed her first main role as Amm in the 2018–2019 television series Friend Zone alongside Ratthanant Janyajirawong. She then starred in Boy For Rent as Liz, who tries out the titular service after suspecting her boyfriend Badz (Tanutchai Wijitvongtong) of cheating, and portrayed Prang in A Gift For Whom You Hate the same year.

During this period, she signed with GMMTV and recorded multiple television soundtracks. She also debuted as an idol in the girl group Sizzy (formerly known as Sissy) in November 2019, remaining with the group until their official disbandment in October 2024.

In 2020, she reprised her role as Amm in Friend Zone 2: Dangerous Area, where her character explores her identity as an asexual lesbian alongside Lapisara Intarasut, and appeared as Keng in Khun Mae Mafia.

Her roles continued in 2021 as Torfun, a volunteer teacher whose heart is transplanted to Tian (Sahaphap Wongratch) following a tragic accident in A Tale of Thousand Stars, and as Papang, a student council president who dies by suicide during a livestream in the mystery teen miniseries The Comments (2021).

In 2022, she played Min, the girlfriend of Korn (Perawat Sangpotirat) in The War of Flowers. She later received widespread acclaim for starring as Saras, one of five women whose secrets unravel following a friend's suicide in the mystery thriller P.S. I Hate You. That same year, she played Piang in the "Memory of Happiness" segment of the anthology series Good Old Days alongside Tawan Vihokratana and Pathompong Reonchaidee.

She subsequently portrayed Praemai in Be My Favorite and Florence in The Jungle in 2023, followed by Ployjang in Ploy's Yearbook (2024). In 2025, she starred as Chompoonut "Chompoo" Bupphachinda in the mystery thriller drama television series Hide & Sis.

== Filmography ==
Key
†	Denotes films that have not yet been released

=== Television series ===
Year	Title	Role	Notes	Ref.
2015	Sud Kaen Saen Rak	Rapheephan Chuensri	Supporting role	
2015	Wonder Teacher	Mary	Guest role	
2015	Room Alone 2	Namhorm	Supporting role	
2016	Raeng Chang	Auengfah	Supporting role	
2016	Nang Eye	Saya	Guest role	
2017	Love Songs Love Series To Be Continued: Close Friend	Kaew	Supporting role	
2017	Love Books Love Series: Mister Daddy	Fey	Supporting role	
2018	Bang Rak Soi 9: Season 2	Music	Supporting role	
2018	Friend Zone	Amm	Main role	
2019	Boy For Rent	Liz	Main role	
2019	A Gift For Whom You Hate	Prang	Main role	
2020	Friend Zone 2: Dangerous Area	Amm	Main role	
2020	Khun Mae Mafia	Keng	Supporting role	
2021	A Tale of Thousand Stars	Torfun	Supporting role	
2021	The Comments	Papang	Main role	
2022	The War of Flowers	Min	Main role	
2022	P.S. I Hate You	Saras	Main role	
2022	Good Old Days: Story 2 – Memory of Happiness	Piang	Main role	
2023	Be My Favorite	Praemai	Supporting role	
2023	The Jungle	Florence	Main role	
2024	Ploy's Yearbook	Ployjang	Main role	
2025	Hide & Sis	Chompoo	Main role	
2026	Scarlet Heart Ullavee	Maneethip	Supporting role	
TBA	Her †	Linin	Supporting role	

=== Television show ===
Year	Title	Network	Ref.
2018–2019	#TEAMGIRL	GMM 25	

== Discography ==
=== Soundtrack appearances ===
Year	Title	Album	Label	Ref.
2018	"ให้มันน่าKissหน่อย"	Kiss Me Again OST	GMMTV Records	
2018	"จำฉันได้หรือเปล่า"	Happy Birthday OST	GMMTV Records	
2019	"แสนดี แค่ลวง วกวน หรือจริงใจ"	Boy For Rent OST	GMMTV Records	
2019	"ที่สุดในโลก"	Boy For Rent OST	GMMTV Records	
2020	"อยากถูกมองด้วยแววตาแบบนั้น"	Who Are You OST	GMMTV Records	
2020	"ลองเป็นฉันดูไหม (Tell Me You Love Me)" with Mond Tanutchai	Khun Mae Mafia OST	GMMTV Records	
2021	"นิทานพันดาว (ทอฝัน Version)"	A Tale of Thousand Stars OST	GMMTV Records	
2021	"เศษ (Dust) นาบี Version"	Nabi, My Stepdarling OST	GMMTV Records	
2021	"เมื่อไหร่จะถึงใจเธอ"	Mr. Lipstick OST	GMMTV Records	
2021	"Forever You"	Irresistible OST	GMMTV Records	
2022	"ยอม"	The War of Flowers OST	GMMTV Records	
2022	"คนร้าย"	P.S. I Hate You OST	GMMTV Records	
2023	"ต่อให้รู้ว่าไม่จริง (White Lie)"	Beauty Newbie OST	GMMTV Records	
2024	"Friendship"	Ploy's Yearbook OST	GMMTV Records	
2025	"หาย (Hide)" with Emi Thasorn	Hide & Sis OST	GMMTV Records	

== Awards and nominations ==
Award nominations for Sarunchana Apisamaimongkol
Year	Award	Category	Nominee(s)	Result	Ref.
2020	Zoom Dara Awards 2020	Popular Single	"เปลี่ยนคะแนนเป็นแฟนได้ไหม" (Love Score) by Sizzy x Nanon	Won	
2021	Siam Series Awards	Most Popular Supporting Actress	A Tale of Thousand Stars	Nominated	
2025	30th Asian Television Awards	Best Actress in a Leading Role	Hide & Sis	Nominated	
