= Lovey Dovey (TV series) =

2016 Thai television series

- Official series poster
- Thai: Lovey Dovey – แผนร้ายนายเจ้าเล่ห์
- Genre: Romantic comedy
- Created by: GMMTV
- Based on: Lovey Brother แผนรักร้ายของ (พี่) ชายจอมเจ้าเล่ห์ Dovey Sister แผนรักสยบหัวใจ (พี่) สาวจอมเชิด by May 112
- Starring: Chutavuth Pattarakampol; Sheranut Yusananda; Nichaphat Chatchaipholrat; Thassapak Hsu
- Country of origin: Thailand
- Original language: Thai
- No. of episodes: 20

Production
- Running time: 45 minutes
- Production company: GMMTV

Original release
- Network: One31; LINE TV
- Release: 19 June – 4 December 2016

Lovey Dovey (Thai: Lovey Dovey – แผนร้ายนายเจ้าเล่ห์; Lovey Dovey – Phaen Rai Nai Chao-le) is a 2016 Thai television series starring Chutavuth Pattarakampol (March), Sheranut Yusananda (Namcha), Nichaphat Chatchaipholrat (Pearwah) and Thassapak Hsu (Bie).

Produced by GMMTV, the series is an adaptation of the novels Lovey Brother and Dovey Sister by May 112. It premiered on One31 and LINE TV on 19 June 2016, airing on Sundays at 16:00 ICT and 18:00 ICT, respectively. The series concluded on 4 December 2016.

== Cast and characters ==
Below are the cast of the series:

=== Main ===
- Chutavuth Pattarakampol (March) as Daoneu
- Sheranut Yusananda (Namcha) as Kookai
- Nichaphat Chatchaipholrat (Pearwah) as Khaiwan
- Thassapak Hsu (Bie) as Kongfa

=== Supporting ===
- Tawan Vihokratana (Tay) as Dew
- Rutricha Phapakithi (Ciize) as Koi
- Pronpiphat Pattanasettanon (Plustor) as Shang
- Korn Khunatipapisiri (Oaujun) as a young Kongfa
- Methika Jiranorraphat (Jane) as a young Kookai
- Ingkarat Damrongsakkul (Ryu) as a young Daoneu
- Thanaboon Wanlopsirinun (Na) as News
- Praeploy Oree as Coco
