= Friend Zone (TV series) =

2018–19 Thai television series

- Official series poster
- Thai: Friend Zone – เอาให้ชัด
- Genre: Romance; Drama
- Created by: GMMTV
- Directed by: Tidakorn Pookaothong
- Starring: Thanat Lowkhunsombat; Nichaphat Chatchaipholrat; Prachaya Ruangroj; Pronpiphat Pattanasettanon; Nat Sakdatorn; Tipnaree Weerawatnodom; Ratthanant Janyajirawong; Nathasit Kotimanuswanich; Sarunchana Apisamaimongkol
- Country of origin: Thailand
- Original language: Thai
- No. of episodes: 12

Production
- Running time: 50 minutes
- Production companies: GMMTV; Trasher Bangkok

Original release
- Network: One31; LINE TV; GMM 25 (Rerun)
- Release: 11 November 2018 – 2 February 2019

Related
- Friend Zone 2: Dangerous Area

Friend Zone (Thai: Friend Zone – เอาให้ชัด; Friend Zone – Ao Hai Chat) is a 2018–2019 Thai television series starring Thanat Lowkhunsombat (Lee), Nichaphat Chatchaipholrat (Pearwah), Prachaya Ruangroj (Singto), Pronpiphat Pattanasettanon (Plustor), Nat Sakdatorn, Tipnaree Weerawatnodom (Namtan), Ratthanant Janyajirawong (Ter), Nathasit Kotimanuswanich (Best) and Sarunchana Apisamaimongkol (Aye).

Directed by Tidakorn Pookaothong and produced by GMMTV together with Trasher Bangkok, the series was one of the ten television series for 2018 showcased by GMMTV in their "Series X" event on 1 February 2018. It premiered on One31 and LINE TV on 11 November 2018, airing on Sundays at 22:00 ICT and 23:00 ICT, respectively. The series concluded on 2 February 2019.

== Cast and characters ==
=== Main ===
- Thanat Lowkhunsombat (Lee) as Good
- Nichaphat Chatchaipholrat (Pearwah) as Boyo
- Prachaya Ruangroj (Singto) as Earth
- Pronpiphat Pattanasettanon (Plustor) as Stud
- Nat Sakdatorn as Dr. Sam
- Tipnaree Weerawatnodom (Namtan) as Boom
- Ratthanant Janyajirawong (Ter) as Bern
- Nathasit Kotimanuswanich (Best) as Tor
- Sarunchana Apisamaimongkol (Aye) as Amm

=== Supporting ===
- Way-Ar Sangngern (Joss) as Safe
- Chayapol Jutamas (AJ) as Ta
- Tosatid Darnkhuntod (Ten) as Arm
- Sutthipha Kongnawdee (Noon) as Ploypink
- Watchara Sukchum (Jennie) as Satang
- Natthaweeranuch Thongmee (Ja) as Pun
- Phakjira Kanrattanasood (Nanan) as Eve (Claire's sister)
- Napasorn Weerayuttvilai (Puimek) as Claire (Good's ex-girlfriend)
- Chaidi Dididi (Pattai) as Boyo's mother

=== Guest ===
- Pahun Jiyacharoen (Marc) as Umm (Ep. 1–3)
- Pruk Panich (Zee) as Captain (Ep. 6–7)

== Soundtrack ==
Song title	Romanized title	Artist	Ref.
พรุ่งนี้จะเข้าใจ	Prung Nee Ja Kao Jai	Rattana Chanprasit (Na)	

== Awards and nominations ==
Year	Award	Category	Recipient	Result	Ref.
2020	Starpics Thai Films Awards	Best Ensemble Cast	Friend Zone	Won	
2021	Thailand National Film Association Awards	Best Editing	Panayu Kunvanlee – Friend Zone	Nominated	
2021	Asian Television Awards	Best Actress in a Leading Role	Pimchanok Luevisadpaibul – Friend Zone	Nominated	
