= Boy For Rent =

2019 Thai television series

- Official series poster
- Thai: Boy For Rent – ผู้ชายให้เช่า
- Genre: Romantic comedy; Drama
- Created by: GMMTV
- Based on: Badz – Boy For Rent & Sexy – Boy For Rent by Pilaimas Kamchoo (Stampberry)
- Directed by: Ekkasit Trakulkasemsuk
- Starring: Sananthachat Thanapatpisal; Sarunchana Apisamaimongkol; Tanutchai Wijitvongtong; Thanat Lowkhunsombat
- Country of origin: Thailand
- Original language: Thai
- No. of episodes: 12

Production
- Running time: 50 minutes
- Production companies: GMMTV; Keng Kwang Kang

Original release
- Network: One31; LINE TV; GMM 25 (Rerun)
- Release: 10 May – 2 August 2019

Boy For Rent (Thai: Boy For Rent – ผู้ชายให้เช่า; Boy For Rent – Phu Chai Hai Chao) is a 2019 Thai television series starring Sananthachat Thanapatpisal (Fon), Sarunchana Apisamaimongkol (Aye), Tanutchai Wijitvongtong (Mond) and Thanat Lowkhunsombat (Lee).

Directed by Ekkasit Trakulkasemsuk and produced by GMMTV together with Keng Kwang Kang, the series was one of the thirteen television series for 2019 launched by GMMTV in their "Wonder Th13teen" event on 5 November 2018. It premiered on One31 and LINE TV on 10 May 2019, airing on Fridays at 21:45 ICT (previously at 22:00 ICT for the first episode) and 23:00 ICT, respectively. The series concluded on 2 August 2019.

Since 1 June 2020, the series was rerun on GMM 25 airing on Mondays and Tuesdays at 22:45 ICT.

== Cast and characters ==
Below are the cast of the series:

=== Main ===
- Sananthachat Thanapatpisal (Fon) as Smile
- Sarunchana Apisamaimongkol (Aye) as Liz
- Tanutchai Wijitvongtong (Mond) as Badz
- Thanat Lowkhunsombat (Lee) as Kyro

=== Supporting ===
- Rutricha Phapakithi (Ciize) as Onnie
- Sutthipha Kongnawdee (Noon) as Tam
- Jirakit Kuariyakul (Toptap) as Tan
- Chatchawit Techarukpong (Victor) as Jayden
- Suttatip Wutchaipradit (Ampere) as Jenny

=== Guest role ===
- Wanwimol Jaenasavamethee (June) as Badz's young sister
- Nutchapon Rattanamongkol (Nut)
- Sarunthorn Klaiudom (Mean) as Run

== Soundtrack ==
Song title	Romanized title	Artist(s)	Ref.
แสนดี แค่ลวง วกวน หรือจริงใจ	San Dee Kae Luang Wok Von Reu Jing Jai	Sarunchana Apisamaimongkol (Aye)	
ไม่ใช่เรื่องสมมติ	Mai Chai Ruang Som Mut	Jirakit Thawornwong (Mek)	
ที่สุดในโลก	Tee Sud Nai Lohk	Thanat Lowkhunsombat (Lee); Sarunchana Apisamaimongkol (Aye)	
นี่แหละความรัก	Nee Lae Kwahm Ruk	Tanutchai Wijitvongtong (Mond)	
