= Friend Zone 2: Dangerous Area =

2020–21 Thai television series

- Official series poster
- Genre: Romance; Drama
- Created by: GMMTV
- Directed by: Tidakorn Pookaothong
- Starring: Nichaphat Chatchaipholrat; Tipnaree Weerawatnodom; Thanat Lowkhunsombat; Prachaya Ruangroj; Nat Sakdatorn; Pronpiphat Pattanasettanon; Weerayut Chansook; Nathasit Kotimanuswanich; Way-Ar Sangngern; Sarunchana Apisamaimongkol; Purim Rattanaruangwattana
- Country of origin: Thailand
- Original language: Thai
- No. of episodes: 16

Production
- Production companies: GMMTV; Trasher Bangkok

Original release
- Network: GMM 25; LINE TV
- Release: 25 September 2020 – 15 January 2021

Related
- Friend Zone

Friend Zone 2: Dangerous Area is a 2020 Thai television series starring Nichaphat Chatchaipholrat (Pearwah), Tipnaree Weerawatnodom (Namtan), Thanat Lowkhunsombat (Lee), Prachaya Ruangroj (Singto), Nat Sakdatorn, Pronpiphat Pattanasettanon (Plustor), Weerayut Chansook (Arm), Nathasit Kotimanuswanich (Best), Way-Ar Sangngern (Joss), Sarunchana Apisamaimongkol (Aye) and Purim Rattanaruangwattana (Pluem) which serves as the sequel of Friend Zone (2018–19). Directed by Tidakorn Pookaothong and produced by GMMTV together with Trasher Bangkok, it is one of the twelve television series for 2020 showcased by GMMTV during their "New & Next" event on 15 October 2019. The series premiered on GMM 25 and LINE TV on 25 September 2020, airing on Fridays at 22:10 ICT and 23:10 ICT, respectively.

== Cast and characters ==
=== Main ===
- Nichaphat Chatchaipholrat (Pearwah) as Boyo
- Tipnaree Weerawatnodom (Namtan) as Boom
- Thanat Lowkhunsombat (Lee) as Good
- Prachaya Ruangroj (Singto) as Earth
- Nat Sakdatorn as Dr. Sam
- Pronpiphat Pattanasettanon (Plustor) as Stud
- Weerayut Chansook (Arm) as Pop
- Nathasit Kotimanuswanich (Best) as Tor
- Way-Ar Sangngern (Joss) as Safe
- Sarunchana Apisamaimongkol (Aye) as Amm
- Purim Rattanaruangwattana (Pluem) as Locker

=== Supporting ===
- Chayapol Jutamas (AJ) as Ta
- Lapisara Intarasut (Apple) as Cris
- Ravisrarat Pibulpanuvat (Preen) as Bew
- Phatchara Tubthong (Kapook) as Music
- Unnop Thongborisut (Por) as Dr. Ton
- Chanokwanun Rakcheep as Stud's Mother
- Thanavate Siriwattanakul (Gap) as Tod
- Pusit Dittapisit (Fluke) as Blue
