= Angel Beside Me =

2020 Thai television series

- Official series poster
- Thai: Angel Beside Me – เทวดาท่าจะรัก
- Genre: Romantic fantasy; Drama
- Created by: GMMTV
- Based on: Angel Beside Me รัก (หล่น) จากฟากฟ้า by May112
- Directed by: Chatkaew Susiwa
- Starring: Krissanapoom Pibulsonggram; Methika Jiranorraphat
- Opening theme: "Beside You" by Apiwat Phongwat
- Country of origin: Thailand
- Original language: Thai
- No. of episodes: 12

Production
- Production companies: GMM Grammy; GMMTV

Original release
- Network: GMM 25; LINE TV
- Release: 18 January – 4 April 2020

Angel Beside Me (Thai: Angel Beside Me – เทวดาท่าจะรัก; Angel Beside Me – The-wa-da Tha Cha Ruk) is a 2020 Thai television series starring Krissanapoom Pibulsonggram (JJ) and Methika Jiranorraphat (Jane).

Directed by Chatkaew Susiwa and produced by GMMTV, the series was one of the thirteen television series launched by GMMTV in their "Wonder Th13teen" event on 5 November 2018. Originally scheduled for 2019 release, it premiered on GMM 25 and LINE TV on 18 January 2020, airing on Saturdays at 21:30 ICT and 23:00 ICT, respectively. The series concluded on 4 April 2020.

== Cast and characters ==
Below are the cast of the series:

=== Main ===
- Krissanapoom Pibulsonggram (JJ) as Mikael Lansaladon Aekisna Ares/Somchai
- Methika Jiranorraphat (Jane) as Lin

=== Supporting ===
- Pongkool Suebsung as Thong
- Jirakit Thawornwong (Mek) as Luke
- Juthapich Indrajundra (Jamie) as Punpun
- Gornpop Janjaroen (Joke) as Stephen Shepherd (Police Angel)
- Sumonrat Wattanaselarat as Rarin
- Phatchara Tubthong (Kapook) as Dujao
- Worranit Thawornwong (Mook) as Serena
- Patchata Janngeon (Fiat) as Gabriel (Angel)
- Patrick Nattawat Finkler as Cupid

=== Guest ===
- Pronpiphat Pattanasettanon (Plustor) as Guardian Angel
- Niti Chaichitathorn (Pompam) as Lord of Angels
- Napasorn Weerayuttvilai (Puimek) as Angel of Love
- Purim Rattanaruangwattana (Pluem) as Angel
- Harit Cheewagaroon (Sing)
- Chanagun Arpornsutinan (Gunsmile) as Munggorn
- Rachanun Mahawan (Film) as Baitoey

== Soundtrack ==
Song title	Artist	Ref.
"Beside You"	Apiwat Phongwat	
