= Fabulous 30: The Series =

2017–18 Thai television series

- Official series poster
- Thai: 30 กำลังแจ๋ว The Series
- Genre: Romantic comedy; Drama
- Created by: GMMTV
- Based on: 30 กำลังแจ๋ว by Somching Srisupap
- Directed by: Worrawech Danuwong
- Starring: Preechaya Pongthananikorn; Tanutchai Wijitvongtong
- Country of origin: Thailand
- Original language: Thai
- No. of episodes: 12

Production
- Running time: 50 minutes
- Production company: GMMTV

Original release
- Network: One31; LINE TV; GMM 25 (Rerun)
- Release: 20 November 2017 – 12 February 2018

Fabulous 30: The Series (Thai: 30 กำลังแจ๋ว The Series; Sam Sip Kamlang Chaeo The Series) is a 2017–2018 Thai television series adaptation of the 2011 film with the same title, Fabulous 30, starring Preechaya Pongthananikorn (Ice) and Tanutchai Wijitvongtong (Mond).

Produced by GMMTV, the series premiered on One31 and LINE TV on 20 November 2017, airing on Mondays at 22:00 ICT and 23:00 ICT, respectively. The series concluded on 12 February 2018 and was rerun on GMM 25 last 2019.

== Cast and characters ==
Below are the cast of the series:

=== Main ===
- Preechaya Pongthananikorn (Ice) as Ja
- Tanutchai Wijitvongtong (Mond) as Por

=== Supporting ===
- Kawee Tanjararak (Beam) as Captain Nop
- Jumpol Adulkittiporn (Off) as Zen
- Seo Ji Yeon as Ann
- Savitree Suttichanond (Beau) as Cee
- Leo Saussay as Shiro
- Ployshompoo Supasap (Jan) as Gift
- Wichayanee Pearklin (Gam) as Yui
- Orn-anong Panyawong as Ja's mother

=== Guest ===
- Worrawech Danuwong (Dan)
- Siwaj Sawatmaneekul (New)

== Soundtrack ==
Song title	Romanized title	Artist	Ref.
เก็บไว้เพื่อรักแต่เธอ	Gep Wai Pur Ruk Tae Tur	Worrawech Danuwong (Dan)	
ทำไมต้องรักเธอ	Tum Mai Taung Ruk Tur	Preechaya Pongthananikorn (Ice)	
