= A Gift For Whom You Hate =

2019 Thai television series

- Official series poster
- Thai: ของขวัญเพื่อคนที่คุณเกลียด
- Genre: Supernatural thriller; Mystery
- Created by: GMMTV
- Based on: "The Gift Shop For Whom You Hate" (ร้านของขวัญเพื่อคนที่คุณเกลียด) from My Mania 2 (2014) by Eakasit Thairaat
- Directed by: Sarot Nuamsamran
- Starring: Toni Rakkaen; Sarunchana Apisamaimongkol; Napasorn Weerayuttvilai; Jirakit Thawornwong; Tipnaree Weerawatnodom; Chatchawit Techarukpong; Patchata Janngeon; Santisuk Promsiri; Rhatha Phongam
- Country of origin: Thailand
- Original language: Thai
- No. of episodes: 10

Production
- Executive producer: Sataporn Panichraksapong
- Producer: Nar-ra-tor
- Running time: 50 minutes
- Production companies: GMMTV; Nar-ra-tor

Original release
- Network: One31; LINE TV
- Release: 18 October – 20 December 2019

A Gift For Whom You Hate (Thai: ของขวัญเพื่อคนที่คุณเกลียด; RTGS: Khongkhwan Phuea Khon Thi Khun Kliat) is a 2019 Thai television series starring Toni Rakkaen, Sarunchana Apisamaimongkol (Aye), Napasorn Weerayuttvilai (Puimek), Jirakit Thawornwong (Mek), Tipnaree Weerawatnodom (Namtan), Chatchawit Techarukpong (Victor), Patchata Janngeon (Fiat), Santisuk Promsiri (Noom), and Rhatha Phongam (Ying). Based on the story "The Gift Shop For Whom You Hate" from the Thai horror comic book My Mania 2 (2014) by Eakasit Thairaat, the series follows a police inspector who delves into confounding cases linked to a mysterious shop that sells "gifts" for people a customer hates.

Directed by Sarot Nuamsamran and produced by GMMTV together with Nar-ra-tor, the series was one of the thirteen television series for 2019 launched by GMMTV during their "Wonder Th13teen" event on 5 November 2018. It premiered on One31 and LINE TV on 18 October 2019, airing on Sundays at 22:30 ICT and 23:30 ICT, respectively. The series concluded on 20 December 2019.

== Synopsis ==
The series follows a police inspector Chut (Tony Rakkaen) who delves into confounding cases linked to the "Gift Shop For Whom You Hate," a mysterious shop that sells "gifts" for people who are the object of a customer's hatred.

== Cast and characters ==
=== Main ===
- Toni Rakkaen as Chut Pakdeethai

An upright police inspector who delves into the mysterious deaths linked to the Gift Shop For Whom You Hate; Bell's husband.

- Sarunchana Apisamaimongkol (Aye) as Prangrung "Prang" Saehiw

A high school student and girl idol wannabe; Ploy's best friend and Nomnum's younger sister.

- Napasorn Weerayuttvilai (Puimek) as Pimpisa "Ploy" Siripongraksa

A high school student; daughter of Supasit and Ploy's best friend.

- Jirakit Thawornwong (Mek) as Nomnum "Num" Saehiw

Owner of a repair shop who is in debt and is threatened by his lenders; Ploy's elder brother.

- Tipnaree Weerawatnodom (Namtan) as Punnapa "Bell" Siripattana

A news anchor; Chut's wife.

- Chatchawit Techarukpong (Victor) as Krit Janekarn

A police inspector who gets involved in fabricating evidences; Chut's close friend.

- Patchata Janngeon (Fiat) as Aekungkan (Oat)

A high school student who developed sadomasochistic tendencies due to an abusive childhood. He is obsessed with his crush Prang.

- Santisuk Promsiri (Noom) as Supasit Siripongraksa

A politician who aspires to be a Prime Minister; Ploy's father.

- Rhatha Phongam (Ying) as Teacher Kim

A high school teacher who works on weekends in a home for the aged; Prang, Ploy and Oat's homeroom teacher; member of the vigilante group The Judge.

=== Supporting ===
- Apichaya Saejung (Ciize) as New Year

A high school student who dies from a hate gift that Prang intended to give to Ploy.

- Suraphon Phunphiriya as General Sakda

A corrupt police chief who is involved in schemes that will lead to Supasit's victory in the national elections.

- Kittipat Chalaragse (Golf) as Kaew

The secretary of Bell's boss.

- Phakjira Kanrattanasoot (Nanan) as Tarn

Bell's co-worker.

- Krittanai Arsalprakit (Nammon) as Champ

A member of The Judge working undercover as a nurse to Teacher Kim's dying husband.

- Surasak Chaiyaat (Noo) as Chut's father / Hatred

- Chut's father: A high-ranking police officer who was killed by a gift from the Gift Shop For Whom You Hate; a corrupt police unbeknownst to Chut.
- Hatred: The personification of hatred and shopkeeper of the Gift Shop For Whom You Hate who sports a creepy mask. Though his true appearance was never revealed, he temporarily takes on the face of Chut's late father in the final episodes when Chut take off his mask in an attempt to subdue him.
