= Partith Pisitkul =

Thai actor and singer

- พาทิศ พิสิฐกุล
- Born: Sith Thantipisitkul; 30 September 1982 (age 43); Bang Kruai, Nonthaburi Province, Thailand
- Other names: Pai; Patit Pisitkul
- Occupations: Actor; singer
- Years active: 2001–present
- Height: 1.82 m (5 ft 11 1/2 in)

Partith Pisitkul (Thai: พาทิศ พิสิฐกุล, also spelt Patit Pisitkul, born Sith Thantipisitkul), better known by his nickname Pai (ไผ่), is a Thai actor and singer. He is part of a band called Friend. He (Pisitkul) graduated from Thammasat University in Faculty of Commerce and Accountancy. Pisitkul is managed by Channel 7.

== Filmography ==
Year	Title	Role
2002	Ping	Peter
2003	Benja Keta Kwarm Ruk	Sichon
2004	Ni Chiwit	Suthat
2005	Kerd Tae Tom	Solot
2005	Seub Sao Rao Ruk	Mai
2005	Duang Jai Lae Sai Nam	Ainam
2007	Fah Hin Din Sai	Akkhani (Hin)
2007	Apimaheuma Maha Setee	Ek
2007	Saeng Dao Hang Hua Jai	Chanapol
2008	Sai Yai Sawad	Jaonoi
2008	Pom Rak Roi Adit	Naethae
2008	Hor Ying	Woot
2009	Pleng Ruk Kaam Pob	Paytai
2009	Sao 5	Gring Klongtakien
2009	Ruk Tae Kae Dai	Phumchai
2010	Hong Fah	Wayu
2010	Khun Pho Wan Waeo	Suriyon
2011	Ubath Ruk Koh Sawan	Chalarm
2011	Nai Roy Ruk	Kuthep
2011	Sao 5 Tubtim Siam	Gring Klongtakien
2012	The Rustic Model	In / Indy
2012	Kuphai Huajai Waeo	Sawasdee
2013	Suparboorut Ban Thung	Hin
2013	Yomabaan Jao Ka	Thongdee
2013	Nak Soo Maha Gaan	Korn
2015	Waan Jai Nai Jit Raberd	Thana Rachuang
2016	Pak Boong Kub Goong Nang	Korn
2018	Sa Kao Duen	Itsaret
2018	Rak Chan Sawan Jat Hai	Akkanee
2018	Pak	Urot
2019	Pom Ruk Salub Hua Jai	Theeradeth
2019	Love, Lie, Haunt The Series: The Mysterious House	Bi
2020	Khun Mae Mafia	Natthaphon
2021	The Prince Who Turns into a Frog	Reukrit
2021	Irresistible	Thada
2022	Miraculous 5	Himself
2023	The Secret of Moment	Pete
2023	Ruean Chadanang	Ramet
2024	Marital Justice	Kanokphon
2024	Tempting Heart	Phuri
2024	Don't Come Home	Danai
2025	The Ex-Morning	Yong
