= Wolf (Thai TV series) =

2019 Thai television series

- Official series poster
- Thai: Wolf – เกมล่าเธอ
- Genre: Action; Adventure
- Created by: GMMTV
- Directed by: Nuttapong Mongkolsawas
- Starring: Toni Rakkaen; Sutatta Udomsilp; Thitipoom Techaapaikhun; Jumpol Adulkittiporn; Kanaphan Puitrakul
- Country of origin: Thailand
- Original language: Thai
- No. of episodes: 13

Production
- Production locations: Thailand; Vietnam; Singapore; Japan; China; Macau
- Running time: 50 minutes
- Production company: GMMTV

Original release
- Network: One31; LINE TV
- Release: 25 January – 26 April 2019

Wolf (Thai: Wolf – เกมล่าเธอ; Wolf – Game La Thoe) is a 2019 Thai television series starring Toni Rakkaen, Sutatta Udomsilp (Punpun), Thitipoom Techaapaikhun (New), Jumpol Adulkittiporn (Off) and Kanaphan Puitrakul (First).

Directed by Nuttapong Mongkolsawas and produced by GMMTV, the series was one of the ten television series launched by GMMTV in their "Series X" event on 1 February 2018. Originally scheduled for 2018 release, it premiered on One31 and LINE TV on 25 January 2019, airing on Fridays at 22:00 ICT and 23:00 ICT, respectively. The series concluded on 26 April 2019.

== Cast and characters ==
Below are the cast of the series:

=== Main ===
- Toni Rakkaen as Don
- Sutatta Udomsilp (Punpun) as Mo
- Thitipoom Techaapaikhun (New) as Plan
- Jumpol Adulkittiporn (Off) as Por
- Kanaphan Puitrakul (First) as Ryo

=== Supporting ===
- Supoj Janjareon (Lift) as Ryo's father
- Trai Nimtawat (Neo) as Bank
- Juthapich Indrajundra (Jamie) as Ashley
- Harit Cheewagaroon (Sing) as Kon
- Supanaree Sutichitwong (Fern) as Mew Mew

=== Guest role ===
- Maria Poonlertlarp as Ben/Beer
- Chayanit Chansangavej (Pat) as Miss White
- Alysaya Tsoi (Alice) as Miss Black
- Pahun Jiyacharoen (Marc) as Mark
- Chinnarat Siripongchawalit (Mike) as Tum
- Luke Ishikawa Plowden as Ken
- Uttsada Panichkul (Utt) as Patrick
- Suppanad Jittaleela (Tina) as Sam
- Paweenut Pangnakorn as Nida
- Methika Jiranorraphat (Jane) as Ping
- Weerayut Chansook (Arm) as Tiger
- Ployshompoo Supasap (Jan) as Kwan
- Daweerit Chullasapya (Pae) as Robert
- Way-Ar Sangngern (Joss) as a bartender
- Sarocha Burintr (Gigie) as Grace
- Krittanai Arsalprakit (Nammon) as Payu
- Napasorn Weerayuttvilai (Puimek) as Yo
- Tipnaree Weerawatnodom (Namtan) as Pin
- Kay Lertsittichai (Kayavine) as Koji
- Nichaphat Chatchaipholrat (Pearwah) as Pauline
- Marisa Anita as Linda
- Dhanundhorn Neerasingh (Fang) as Jub-An
- Praeploy Oree
- Chompoopuntip Temtanamongkol (Acare) as Mariko
- Jun Vũ as Hải Anh

== Soundtrack ==
Song title	Romanized title	Artist	Ref.
เกมล่าเธอ	Game Lar Ter	Suthita Chanachaisuwan	
