= Endless Love (2019 TV series) =

2019 Thai television series

- Official series poster
- Thai: Endless Love – รักหมดใจ
- Genre: Romance; Drama
- Created by: GMMTV
- Based on: Endless Love (2010 Taiwanese TV series)
- Directed by: Ekkasit Trakulkasemsuk
- Starring: Thanat Lowkhunsombat; Violette Wautier
- Country of origin: Thailand
- Original language: Thai
- No. of episodes: 15

Production
- Running time: 50 minutes
- Production companies: GMMTV; Keng Kwang Kang

Original release
- Network: GMM 25; LINE TV
- Release: 11 August – 17 November 2019

Endless Love (Thai: Endless Love – รักหมดใจ; Endless Love – Rak Mot Chai) is a 2019 Thai television series adaptation of the 2010 Taiwanese drama of the same title "Endless Love", starring Thanat Lowkhunsombat (Lee) and Violette Wautier.

Directed by Ekkasit Trakulkasemsuk and produced by GMMTV together with Keng Kwang Kang, the series was one of the thirteen television series for 2019 launched by GMMTV in their "Wonder Th13teen" event on 5 November 2018. It premiered on GMM 25 and LINE TV on 11 August 2019, airing on Sundays at 20:10 ICT and 22:00 ICT, respectively. The series concluded on 17 November 2019.

== Cast and characters ==
Below are the cast of the series:

=== Main ===
- Thanat Lowkhunsombat (Lee) as Day
- Violette Wautier as Min

=== Supporting ===
- Sivakorn Lertchuchot (Guy) as Phon
- Sarocha Burintr (Gigie) as Namol
- Santisuk Promsiri (Noom) as Theep
- Teerapong Leowrakwong (Bie) as Pairoj (Min's father)
- Kalaya Lerdkasemsap (Ngek) as Pornphen (Phon's mother)
- Chanana Nutakom (Dee) as Wiganda (Namon's mother)
- Paramej Noiam (Plai) as Tua
- Nachat Juntapun (Nicky) as Cue
- Patteera Sarutipongpokin (Orn) as Fah (Min's housemate)
- Pinyadar Salinvarradar (Nitta) as Nene (Min's classmate)
- Weerayut Chansook (Arm) as Danthai (Day's assistant)
- Praeploy Oree (Pray) as Pimrak (Day's assistant)
- Suttatip Wutchaipradit (Ampere) as Jom (Namon's manager)

=== Guest ===
- Suporn Sangkaphibal (Nui) as E (Theep's caregiver) (Ep. 1-3)
- Ninmon Bunsachai (Tak) as Art teacher (Ep. 1, 3, 5)
- Phurikulkrit Chusakdiskulwibul (Amp) as Atichart (Ep. 10-11, 14)

== Soundtrack ==
Song title	Romanized title	Artist	Ref.
จะยอมให้เธอคนเดียว	Ja Yom Hai Tur Kon Diow	Tanont Chumroen (Non)	
ไม่ใช่เรื่องบังเอิญ	Mai Chai Reung Bang Earn	Wonderframe	
