= Yongwaree Anilbol =

Thai actress and model (born 1999)

- ยงวรี อนิลบล
- Born: Yongwaree Ngamkasem; January 16, 1999 (age 27); Bangkok, Thailand
- Other name: Fah Yongwaree
- Education: (Thailand) Ramkhamhaeng University-Bachelor of Laws (United States) Commercial Pilot Program (Thailand) Bodindecha School
- Occupations: Actress; Model
- Years active: 2017–present
- Agent: GMMTV (2020–2024)
- Height: 1.67 m (5 ft 5 1/2 in)
- Spouse: William Cavanaugh
- Children: Joanna Marie Cavanaugh

Yongwaree Anilbol (Thai: ยงวรี อนิลบล); born 16 January 1999), nicknamed Fah (Thai: ฟ้า), is a Thai actress and model.

== Early life ==
Fah was born in Bangkok, Thailand on January 16, 1999. Since her mother worked as a flight attendant at Cathay Pacific, Fah has been interested in the aviation industry since childhood. After graduating from high school, Fah attended Law school and flight school. She obtained a Bachelor of Laws (LL.B.) and Commercial Pilot certificate.

== Career ==
In 2014, Yongwaree, who was only 15 years old, entered the industry as the host of the Thai PBS channel Kid Sanook program[1]. In 2017, she played the role of "Duangkae" in the TV series "Petch Klang Fai" for the first time.

On October 14, 2019, the movie "Khun Phan Begins" that she starring actor Mario Maurer was officially released in Thailand.

In January 2020, she starred in the TV series "The Seawave" with Wongsakorn Paramatthakorn. In the same year, she starred in GMM25 "Fai Sin Chua" and played the role of "Atcharee" in the play.

On February 22, 2021, co-starred with Myria Benedetti and Way-Ar Sangngern in the series "Nabi, My Stepdarling" which premiered on GMM25.

== Filmography ==
=== Film ===
| Year | Title | Role |
|---|---|---|
| 2019 | Khun Phan Begins | Pim |

=== Dramas ===
| Year | Thai Title | English Title | Role | Network |
|---|---|---|---|---|
| 2017 | เพชรกลางไฟ | Petch Klang Fai | Duangkhae (Supporting) | Channel 3 |
| 2020 | ทะเลแปร | The Seawave | Taddiya / "Tadd" | Amarin TV |
| 2020 | ไฟสิ้นเชื้อ | Fai Sin Chua | Atcharee / "Fah" | GMM25 |
| 2020 | จุดจบของส่วนเกิน | Club Friday Season 12: The Paramour's End | View | GMM25 |
| 2021 | นาบี ฉันจะไม่รักเธอ | Nabi, My Stepdarling | Nabi / "Bi" | GMM25 |
| 2021 | เธอเขาเงาแค้น | An Eye for an Eye | Nuengjai / "Nueng" (Supporting) | GMM25 |
| 2021 | หัวใจรักสี่ดวงดาว | F4 Thailand: Boys Over Flowers | Renita Asavarattanakul / "Mira" | GMM25 |
| 2022 | ใครคือ...อองชองเต | Enchanté | Fon (Supporting) | GMM25 |
| 2022 | คืนนับดาว | Astrophile | Tankhun's neighbour (Cameo) | GMM25 |
| 2022 | ด้วยรักและหักหลัง | P.S. I Hate You | Methacha Kantisena / "May" | GMM25 |
| 2022 | ร้านซื้อขายความทรงจำ | Good Old Days: Story 1: Bond and Relationship | Mint | Disney+ Hotstar |
| 2022 | รูปลับรหัสวาร์ป | The Warp Effect | Jean | GMM25 |
| 2023 | พิพิธภัณฑ์รัตติกาล | Midnight Museum | Ing (Cameo) | GMM25 |
| 2024 | เธมโป้ | ThamePo: Heart That Skips a Beat | Gam (Supporting) | GMM25 |
