= Juthapich Indrajundra =

Thai-German actress (born 1997)

- จุฑาพิชญ์ อินทร์จันทร์
- Born: 12 December 1997 (age 28); Bangkok, Thailand
- Other names: Jamie (เจมี่); Jutaphit Inchan
- Education: Chulalongkorn University
- Occupation: Actress
- Years active: 2018–present
- Agent: GMMTV
- Known for: Jingjai in Home School; Ploy in Ploy's Yearbook; May in MuTeLuv: Love Lock

Juthapich Indrajundra (Thai: จุฑาพิชญ์ อินทร์จันทร์; born 1997), nicknamed Jamie (Thai: เจมี่), is a Thai-German actress. She is best known for her roles in Home School (2023), Ploy's Yearbook (2024) and MuTeLuv: Love Lock (2025).

== Early life and education ==
Juthapich was born on December 12, 1997 in Bangkok, Thailand and graduated from Chulalongkorn University's Faculty of Communication Arts. She also competed in the Chulalongkorn-Thammasat Traditional Football Festival. She then went back to University to pursue a master's degree in Business Administration, graduating for the second time in 2023.

== Career ==
Whilst in her second year of studying Chulalongkorn University, she became a junior to GMMTV alumni Tawan Vihokratana (Tay), who recommended she come to an open casting call for the series Kiss Me Again. Her breakthrough role came in the 2023 series Home School Since then she had also gone on to star in Ploy's Yearbook and MuTeLuv: Love Lock.

== Filmography ==
=== Film ===
Key
†	Denotes films that have not yet been released

Year	Title	Role	Notes
2026	Inherit †	TBA	Supporting role

=== Television series ===
Key
†	Denotes television productions that have not yet been released

Year	Title	Role	Notes	Network	Ref.
2018	Kiss Me Again	Mint	Supporting role	GMM 25	
2019	Wolf	Ashley	Supporting role	One 31	
2019	Dok Kun Sieng Kaen	Nalin	Supporting role	GMM 25	
2019	Blacklist	Kiwi	Guest role	GMM 25	
2020	Angel Beside Me	Punpun	Supporting role	GMM 25	
2020	Girl Next Room: Motorbike Baby	Mimi	Guest role	GMM 25	
2020	Girl Next Room: Midnight Fantasy	Mimi	Main role	GMM 25	
2020	Girl Next Room: Richy Rich	Mimi	Guest role	GMM 25	
2020	Girl Next Room: Security Love	Mimi	Guest role	GMM 25	
2020	Who Are You	"Kat" Arisara Panthirat	Supporting role	GMM 25	
2021	A Tale of Thousand Stars	Lin	Guest role	GMM 25	
2021	Baker Boys	Mone	Supporting role	GMM 25	
2022	Oops! Mr. Superstar Hit on Me	Tan	Supporting role	GMM 25	
2022	P.S. I Hate You	"Pan" Palana	Supporting role	GMM 25	
2022	The Three GentleBros	"Pha" Nichapha	Supporting role	GMM 25	
2023	Home School	Jingjai	Main role	Amazon Prime Video	
2023	Hidden Agenda	Nita	Supporting role	GMM 25	
2023	The Jungle	Emmy	Guest role	GMM 25	
2024	Ploy's Yearbook	"Ploy / Ploynerd" Paploy	Main role	GMM 25	
2024	Pluto	Frung	Guest role	GMM 25	
2024	Perfect 10 Liners	Kloi	Supporting role	GMM 25	
2025	Break Up Service	Best	Guest role	GMM 25	
2025	The Ex-Morning	Gaogie	Supporting role	GMM 25	
2025	Hide & Sis	Sara	Guest role	GMM 25	
2025	Friendshit Forever	Wawwa	Supporting role	GMM 25	
2025	Melody of Secrets	Nim	Supporting role	One 31	
2026	MuTeLuv: Love Lock	May	Main role	GMM 25	
2026	Enemies with Benefits	"Medsai" Marisa	Supporting role	GMM 25	
2026	Moonshadow	Peach Mahattanakit	Supporting role	GMM 25	
2026	Good Boy	"Jean" Jitrada Jaroenwong	Supporting role	GMM 25	
TBA	I Will Always Save You †	Fern	Supporting role	TBA	
TBA	Plan B to U †	Mi	Supporting role	TBA	
TBA	Lost in Your Eyes †	TBA	Supporting role	TBA	

=== Appearances in music videos ===
Year	Title	Artist(s)	Label	Ref.
2021	"เหงาเป็น (Lonely Mode)"	Joss Way-ar	GMMTV Records	

== Fan meetings ==
Title	Date	Venue	Notes	Ref.
The Ex-Morning Final EP. Fan Meeting	24 July 2025	Siam Pavalai Paragon Cineplex	With The Ex-Morning cast	
