= P.S. I Hate You =

2022 Thai television series

- Official series poster
- Thai: ด้วยรักและหักหลัง
- Genre: Drama; Mystery; Romantic thriller
- Created by: GMMTV
- Based on: "Flower Maze" (วงกตดอกไม้) by Jinatcha Maneesriwong
- Directed by: Tawan Charuchinda
- Starring: Nichaphat Chatchaipholrat; Ployshompoo Supasap; Chayanit Chansangavej; Yongwaree Anilbol; Sarunchana Apisamaimongkol
- Ending theme: Villain (คนร้าย) by Sarunchana Apisamaimongkol
- Country of origin: Thailand
- Original language: Thai
- No. of episodes: 18

Production
- Executive producer: Sataporn Panichraksapong
- Producer: Snap25
- Running time: 46 minutes
- Production companies: GMMTV; Snap25

Original release
- Network: GMM25; Viu
- Release: 1 August – 27 September 2022

P.S. I Hate You (Thai: ด้วยรักและหักหลัง; RTGS: Duai Rak Lae Haklang) is a 2022 Thai television series starring Nichaphat Chatchaipholrat (Pearwah), Ployshompoo Supasap (Jan), Chayanit Chansangavej (Pat), Yongwaree Anilbol (Fah), and Sarunchana Apisamaimongkol (Aye). Based on the novel "Flower Maze" by Jinatcha Maneesriwong, the series follows a group of five women who have their secrets slowly unveiled after one of them committed suicide.

Directed by Tawan Charuchinda and produced by GMMTV together with Snap25, the series was one of the television series for 2022 showcased by GMMTV during their "BORDERLESS" event on December 1, 2021. It officially premiered on 1 August 2022, airing on Mondays and Tuesdays at 20:30 ICT on GMM25 and 22:30 ICT on Viu. The series concluded on 27 September 2022.

== Synopsis ==
Following the revelation of Pantiwa's (Nichaphat Chatchaipholrat) secret tape during her wedding to Pureenut (Phromphiriya Thongputtaruk), which led to her suicide, Meena (Ployshompoo Supasap), one of her friend group of five, searches for the person responsible for switching the wedding slideshow to the secret tape. But Meena's search for the truth ends up uncovering secrets about other pals in the group as well as stories about herself and her ex-boyfriend, Pitch (Thanat Lowkhunsombat), who is also Pantiwa's brother.

Tidawal (Chayanit Chansangavej) is secretly having an affair with Chanon (Purim Rattanaruangwattana), Meena's boyfriend. Methacha (Yongwaree Anilbol) is threatened and blackmailed with a video recorded by Korrawee (Nattaraht Maurice Legrand), Tharinee's (Mayurin Pongpudpunth) new boyfriend, who is also Tidawal's stepmother. Saratsawadee (Sarunchana Apisamaimongkol) is having an affair with a married man, Captain Key (Danai Charuchinta), and is later caught by his wife, Nuttamon (Maneerat Kam-Uan), who is also Lieutenant Term's (Tanutchai Wijitvongtong) cousin. There is also a mysterious female friend, Palana (Juthapich Indrajundra), who might also be holding some secrets too.

== Cast and characters ==
=== Main ===
- Nichaphat Chatchaipholrat (Pearwah) as Pantiwa Tantiwicha (Prae)
- Ployshompoo Supasap (Jan) as Meena Jessina (Meen)
- Chayanit Chansangavej (Pat) as Thidawal Intharaphrom (Wanwan)
- Yongwaree Anilbol (Fah) as Methacha Kantisena (May)
- Sarunchana Apisamaimongkol (Aye) as Saratsawadee Wichawimol (Saras)

=== Supporting ===
- Juthapich Indrajundra (Jamie) as Palana / Pan
- Thanat Lowkhunsombat (Lee) as Pitch

Prae's brother and Meen's ex-boyfriend.

- Purim Rattanaruangwattana (Pluem) as Chanon / Non

Meen's boyfriend who is having an affair with Wanwan.

- Tanutchai Wijitvongtong (Mond) as Lieutenant Tapanon Bawonratana (Term)

A police lieutenant who is in charge of the investigation into his cousin's case and eventually fall in love with Saras.

- Sivakorn Lertchuchot (Guy) as Khunpol / Khun

Meen's senior in the college and workplace.

- Phromphiriya Thongputtaruk (Papang) as Pureenut / Pu

Prae's groom.

- Thanik Kamontharanon (Pawin) as Thanawin / Win

Wanwan's brother who was in a coma after getting hit by a car.

- Nattaraht Maurice Legrand (Nat) as Korrawee Leroy (Wee)
- Sueangsuda Lawanprasert (Namfon) as Chanadda

Pitch and Prae's mother.

- Mayurin Pongpudpunth (Kik) as Tharinee

Wanwan and Win's stepmother.

=== Guest ===
- Chet Klinprathum (JJ) as Adisorn

May's boss.

- Danai Charuchinta (Kik) as Captain Key

A high-ranking pilot who is having an affair with Saras; Nut's husband.

- Maneerat Kam-Uan (Ae) as Nuttamon / Nut

Captain Key's rich wife and Lieutenant Term's cousin who was in a coma after she fell down the stairs in a fight over a cell phone with Saras.

- Jirakit Kuariyakul (Toptap) as Ruj

Saras' ex-boyfriend.

- Pimkae Goonchorn Na Ayutthaya

Non's grandmother.
