= The Underclass =

2020 Thai television series

- Official series poster
- Thai: ห้องนี้..ไม่มีห่วย
- Genre: Teen drama
- Directed by: Pass Patthanakumjon
- Starring: Nannaphas Loetnamchoetsakun; Praewa Suthamphong; Sumitta Duangkaew; Tanutchai Wijitvongtong; Tarisa Preechatangkit; Natticha Chantaravareelekha; Miori Ohkubo
- Country of origin: Thailand
- Original language: Thai
- No. of episodes: 13

Production
- Running time: 55 minutes
- Production companies: GMM Studios International; Tifa Studios

Original release
- Network: GMM25; Netflix
- Release: 5 July – 27 September 2020

The Underclass (Thai: ห้องนี้..ไม่มีห่วย; RTGS: Hong Ni.. Mai Mi Huai) is a 2020 Thai teen drama television series directed by Pass Patthanakumjon and produced by GMM Studios International together with Tifa Studios, starring Nannaphas Loetnamchoetsakun (Mewnich), Praewa Suthamphong (Music), Sumitta Duangkaew (Fye), Tanutchai Wijitvongtong (Mond) and several other members of BNK48.

The story follows an A class student who is caught cheating on an exam, leading to her transfer to the disadvantaged Class F. It aired every Sunday on GMM25 and Netflix from July 5 to September 27, 2020.

== Synopsis ==
Pang (Nannaphas Loetnamchoetsakun), a student of the prestigious Class A, is caught cheating on an exam and demoted to the Class F, the lowest class that almost every student wants to avoid. Initially, she tries to get back to Class A as she still has the ego of being a smart A-class student. She can't get along with anyone, especially not with Meen (Praewa Suthamphong), the Class F leader. However, after interacting with the class for some time, she realizes that class F isn't as horrible as she had imagined.

One day, Pang accidentally gets involved with the Black Sheep gang, a secret group from Class F who takes action right away when there is inequity in the school. Then, an offer comes from Tam (Sumitta Duangkaew), Pang's friend from Class A and the Deputy Director's nephew. If Pang can uncover the Black Sheep identity, she can return to Class A. On the one hand, the offer is tempting, but on the other, she is reluctant to betray the friendship of Class F.

== Cast and characters ==
=== Main ===
- Nannaphas Loetnamchoetsakun (Mewnich) as Pang
- Praewa Suthamphong (Music) as Meen
- Sumitta Duangkaew (Fye) as Tam
- Tanutchai Wijitvongtong (Mond) as Tee

=== Supporting ===
- Tarisa Preechatangkit (Stang) as Kook
- Natticha Chantaravareelekha (Fond) as Meow
- Ohkubo Miori as Miichan
- Pakwan Noijaiboon as Meringue
- Napaphat Worraphuttanon (Jaa) as Namkaeng
- Vathusiri Phuwapunyasiri (Korn) as Lucky
- Rinrada Inthaisong (Piam) as Cornflake
- Suchaya Saenkhot (Jib) as Email
- Mananya Kaoju (Nink) as Gaprao
- Kandis Wanaroon (Maiake) as Moss
- Ekkaphon Deeboonmee Na Chumphae (Au) as Beam
- Panta Pattanaampaiwong (Plai) as Fui
- Suphasawatt Purnaveja (Watt) as Deputy Director Wichai
- Sawanee Utoomma (Iang) as Sansanee Tichakon

=== Guest ===
- Rachaya Tupkunanon (Minmin) as Prapuen
- Phattharanarin Mueanarit (Nine) as Foam
- Chanyapuk Numprasop (New) as Rain
- Natphichamon Singkornwat (Yongyee) as Pang's mother
- Warattaya Deesomlert (Kaimook) as Mook
