= Ploy's Yearbook =

2024 Thai television series

- Official series poster
- Thai: หนังสือรุ่นพลอย
- Genre: Drama; Romantic comedy
- Created by: GMMTV
- Based on: "The Only Regret" (สิ่งเดียวที่เสียดาย ในวันวัยที่สวยงาม) by Nenechan; "Moving around You" (ดาวหมุนรอบฉัน ตะวันหมุนรอบเธอ) by Bhapimol; "Secretly Love" (เพราะเธอคือความลับของหัวใจ) by Tinya; "Busy February: หรือเดือนกุมภามันสั้น เราเลยรักกันไม่ได้เสียที" by Baison; "Faded Memory" (ภาพสีจางกับบางความทรงจำ) by Maysarinn
- Starring: Tipnaree Weerawatnodom; Pirapat Watthanasetsiri; Sutatta Udomsilp; Jitaraphol Potiwihok; Sarunchana Apisamaimongkol; Pathompong Reonchaidee; Rachanun Mahawan; Archen Aydin; Juthapich Indrajundra; Tanutchai Wijitvongtong
- Country of origin: Thailand
- Original language: Thai
- No. of episodes: 16

Production
- Executive producer: Sataporn Panichraksapong
- Producer: Snap25
- Running time: 43-56 minutes
- Production companies: GMMTV; Snap25

Original release
- Network: GMM25; Viu
- Release: 8 April – 28 May 2024

Ploy's Yearbook (Note: (Thai: หนังสือรุ่นพลอย; RTGS: Nangsue Run Ploy)) is a 2024 Thai television series created by GMMTV. Based on five novels by five Thai authors, the series follows five girls named Ploy in the same classroom who discover that their phone numbers were mixed up in the yearbook, leading to various misunderstandings with the boys from their school days.

The series was announced as one of the television series of GMMTV for 2024 during their "GMMTV2024: UP&ABOVE Part 1" event on October 17, 2023. It officially premiered on April 8, 2024, airing on Mondays and Tuesdays at 20:30 ICT on GMM25 and 22:30 ICT on Viu. The series concluded on May 28, 2024 with 16 episodes.

== Synopsis ==
There are five girls named Ploy in the same classroom who have distinct personalities, aspirations, and loves, leading to different nicknames: Ploykit (Active Ploy), Ploysuay (Pretty Ploy), Ploysaeb (Naughty Ploy), Ploynerd (Nerdy Ploy), and Ployjang (Anon Ploy). One day, a chaotic incident happened. Each person's life and romantic pathway take a different turn when the phone numbers in the yearbook get mixed up.

Ploykit, whose house is about to be taken, runs across Thapchana, her first love that didn't work out. Ploykit is the one who made the yearbook, but she has been unaware about what has happened for the past ten years. Thapchana returns with a condition that he will help Ploykit resolve the unrequited love affair of his close friend Ploysuay and Mek, and resolve past misunderstandings between Kram and Ploynerd, Ploysaeb and Pongtawan, and Ployjang and Pimai, who were each other's first loves.

== Cast and characters ==
=== Main ===
- Tipnaree Weerawatnodom (Namtan) as Ploypang (Ploykit)
- Sutatta Udomsilp (PunPun) as Padparadscha (Ploysuay)
- Sarunchana Apisamaimongkol (Aye) as Jewelry (Ployjang)
- Rachanun Mahawan (Film) as Pandara (Ploysaeb)
- Juthapich Indrajundra (Jamie) as Paploy (Ploynerd)
- Pirapat Watthanasetsiri (Earth) as Thapchana (Thap)
- Jitaraphol Potiwihok (Jimmy) Noppatee (Mek)
- Pathompong Reonchaidee (Toy) as Pimai / Plaimas
- Archen Aydin (Joong) as Pongtawan (Tawan)
- Tanutchai Wijitvongtong (Mond) as Kram

=== Supporting ===
- Kanyarat Ruangrung (Piploy) as Mew
- Neen Suwanamas as Cake-som
- Wanwimol Jaenasavamethee (June) as Prakaimook
- Ploynira Hiruntaveesin (Kapook) as Jaochan
- Thanaboon Wanlopsirinun (Na) as Pat
- Thinnaphan Tantui (Thor) as Alex
- Phromphiriya Thongputtaruk (Papang) as Sandee
