= Tanwarin Sukkhapisit =

Thai politician

- ธัญญ์วาริน สุขะพิสิษฐ์
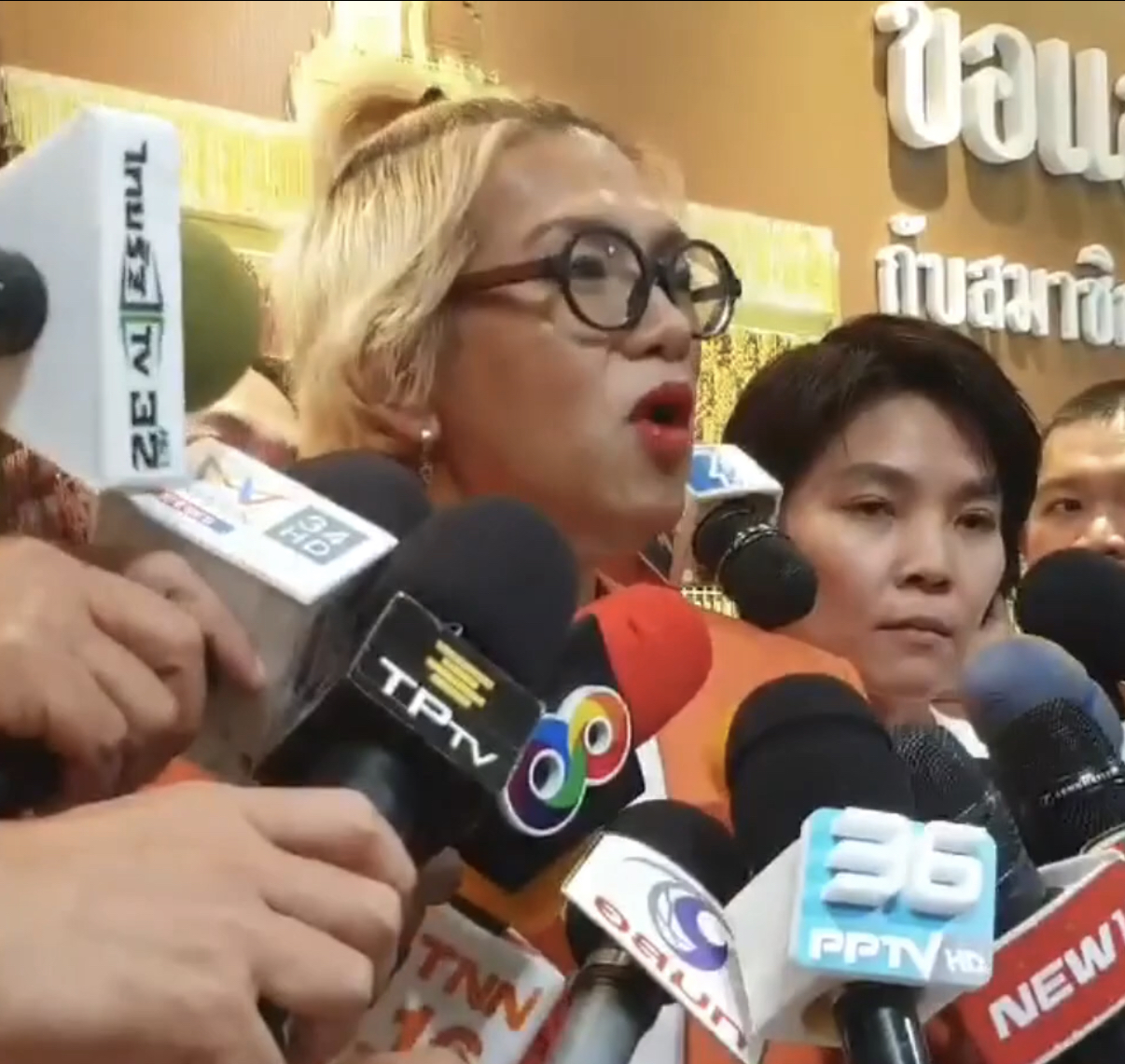
- Tanwarin in 2019

Member of the House of Representatives for the Future Forward Party List
- In office 24 March 2019 – 28 October 2020

Personal details
- Born: October 23, 1973 (age 52) Nakhon Ratchasima Province, Thailand
- Party: Move Forward Party
- Other political affiliations: Future Forward Party (2018–2020)
- Occupation: Filmmaker; politician

Tanwarin Sukkhapisit (Thai: ธัญญ์วาริน สุขะพิสิษฐ์, RTGS: Thanwarin Sukkhaphisit, Thai pronunciation: [tʰān.wāː.rīn sùk.kʰà.pʰí.sìt]) is a Thai filmmaker and politician. They are known for directing the film Insects in the Backyard. Tanwarin identifies as kathoey, and uses they/them pronouns. In the 2019 Thai general election, they were elected to the Thai parliament representing the Future Forward Party. and became the first ever openly transgender member of parliament in Thailand's House of Representatives.

== Biography ==
Tanwarin was born on October 23, 1973, in the Nakhon Ratchasima province. They began publicly living as a woman at 17. They attended Khon Kaen University, where they noted a large presence of cross-dressers and drag-queen shows. While enrolled, they started directing and acting for college plays while completing their graduate studies in Mass Communication. They moved to Bangkok to pursue work in the entertainment industry but was initially unsuccessful. Tanwarin returned to Korat to work as an English teacher for seven years, and played their first role as a kathoey character on a show that was shortly pulled off air. Their first short film that they made, "The Ring", received attention that inspired them to continue their filmmaking career. Tanwarin worked as a waiter for nearly 10 years in order to remain in Bangkok.

== Career ==
=== Film career ===
Tanwarin directed and starred in their first feature film, Insects in the Backyard, released in 2010. The movie was made with a budget of less than 500,000 Thai baht. The story revolves around the troubled lives of a family of siblings Jenny and Johnny, who are raised by their kathoey sibling/mother Tanya. Tanwarin serves to trouble typical notions of kinship and family, as well as explore themes of gender-nonconformity.

Insects in the Backyard was banned by Thailand's Ministry of Culture from being screened for "immoral and pornographic content". Despite its banning, the film was screened at the Bangkok 2010 International Film Festival. It also received attention at international film festivals, such as the 2010 Vancouver International Film Festival. In response to the film's banning, a mock funeral was held in protest which brought around 50 attendees. Sukkhapisit founded their own independent film company, Amfine Productions, in response to the banning.

Tanwarin continued to fight the legal ruling. In 2015, five years after the initial ban, the Administrative Court ruled to uphold the ban, referencing a three-second sex scene in which genitals are visible as the aforementioned pornography. The film was eventually screened for the first time in Thailand in 2017, with said scene removed.

=== Political career ===
Years after their film banning, Tanwarin was inspired to enter politics to campaign for LGBTQ+ rights, and became the first transgender MP in Thailand.

At their first appearance in parliament, Tanwarin, alongside other newly elected LGBTQ+ members of parliament, appeared in brightly coloured outfits as a statement against the conservative politicians and government.

In October 2020, the Constitutional Court of Thailand removed Tanwarin from power, finding them guilty of rules barring lawmakers from owning stock in media companies. Tanwarin's removal has been tied to a broader crackdown on Thailand's pro-democracy movement, with one commentator in the Bangkok Post writing that they were "unjustly removed" in a "huge blow to the Thai LGBTI community".

== Filmography ==
=== Director ===
- Still (2010)
- Insects in the Backyard (2010)
- Hug na Sarakham (2011)
- It Gets Better (2012)
- Fin Sugoi (2014)
- Threesome (2014)
- Keep Running. Zombie Soldier! (2015)
- Red Wine in the Dark Night (2015)
- A Gas Station (2016)
- Sanaeha Maya (2018)
- Irresistible (2021)
- The War of Flowers (2022)
- The Eclipse (2022)
- 609 Bedtime Story (2022)
- Jenny AM/PM (2022)
- Moments of Love (2023)
- Our Skyy 2 (2023)
- Club Friday 15: Moments & Memories (2023)
- Club Friday 16: Hot Love Issue (2024)
- Wandee Goodday (2024)
- The Rebound (2024)
- Club Friday 17: The Theory of Love (2025)

=== Writer ===
- Insects in the Backyard (2010)
- Keep Running. Zombie Soldier! (2015)
- Red Wine in the Dark Night (2015)
- A Gas Station (2016)
- Napat (2021)

=== Producer ===
- Judgement Island (2015)
- Red Wine in the Dark Night (2015)
- A Gas Station (2016)
- Present Perfect (2017)
- 609 Bedtime Story (2022–2023)
- Our Skyy 2 (2023)

=== Actress ===
- The Sperm (2007)
- Insects in the Backyard (2010)
- Tai Hong 2 (2014)
- Summer to Winter (2014)
- Bong Srolanh Oun (2015)
- Love Next Door 2 (2015)
- The Eclipse (2022)
- Our Skyy 2 (2023)
- Wandee Goodday (2024)
- The Rebound (2024)
