= The Comments =

2021 Thai television miniseries

- Official series poster
- Thai: ทุกความคิดเห็น..มีฆ่า
- Genre: Drama; Mystery
- Directed by: Kanittha Kwunyoo
- Starring: Sarunchana Apisamaimongkol; Thitipoom Techaapaikhun; Pathompong Reonchaidee; Rutricha Phapakithi; Rachanun Mahawan; Harit Cheewagaroon
- Country of origin: Thailand
- Original language: Thai
- No. of episodes: 5

Production
- Executive producer: Sataporn Panichraksapong
- Running time: 45 minutes
- Production companies: GMMTV; Nar-ra-tor

Original release
- Network: GMM25; YouTube
- Release: 23 May – 6 June 2021

The Comments (Thai: ทุกความคิดเห็น..มีฆ่า; RTGS: Thuk Khwam Khit Hen Mee Kha) is a Thai teen drama mystery television miniseries directed by Kanittha Kwunyoo (Fon) and produced by GMMTV together with Nar-ra-tor. It stars Sarunchana Apisamaimongkol (Aye), Thitipoom Techaapaikhun (New), Pathompong Reonchaidee (Toy), Rutricha Phapakithi (Ciize), Rachanun Mahawan (Film) and Harit Cheewagaroon (Sing). The series is produced with a special fund from Thai Media Fund for raising awareness about cyberbullying and problems on social media. It aired on GMM25 and GMMTV YouTube channel from May 23 to June 6, 2021.

== Synopsis ==
Papang (Sarunchana Apisamaimongkol), the student council president and an outstanding student who is perfect in every way, decides to commit suicide during her own live broadcast, using the same method as her favorite celebrity, Gina (Jennie Panhan), a transgender idol who was cyberbullied until she decided to commit suicide during her own live broadcast. This tragedy prompts Kan (Thitipoom Techaapaikhun), Papang's older brother, to investigate why his sister chose to commit suicide this time, with the help of Phat (Pathompong Reonchaidee), a young teacher assistant who works as the assistant of Wimol (Suda Chuenban), Papang's homeroom teacher.

Kan and Phat begin to investigate the truth from Papang's school friends, including Nan (Rutricha Phapakithi), a social media addict who believes she is inherently inferior to Papang; Toon (Rachanun Mahawan), the top student, who aspires to be student council president in order to create equality; Pok (Harit Cheewagaroon), a simple guy who once had a crush on Papang but was rejected shamelessly; and even Papang's mother, Pimpa (Fon Tanasoontorn), who has had a long-standing feud with her because Pimpa secretly dated Wittaya, who already has a family. She also seems to be hiding some truth as well.

As Kan and Phat continue their investigation, they uncover more and more concerning hints, leading them to conclude that Papang's perfect environment is actually concealing harassment and bullying that leaves the victim with painful scars. Therefore, they try get the answer to the question: who caused Papang to end her own life?

== Cast and characters ==
=== Main ===
- Sarunchana Apisamaimongkol (Aye) as Papang
- Thitipoom Techaapaikhun (New) as Kan
- Pathompong Reonchaidee (Toy) as Teacher Phat
- Rutricha Phapakithi (Ciize) as Nan
- Rachanun Mahawan (Film) as Toon
- Harit Cheewagaroon (Sing) as Pok

=== Supporting ===
- Jennie Panhan as Gina
- Suda Chuenban (Mao) as Wimol
- Fon Tanasoontorn as Pimpa (Kan and Papang's mother)
- Sukol Sasijulaka (Jome) as Wittaya
- Thunyah Teerakachornkit (Gym) as Champ
- Isarasaena Na Ayuttaya (Mummy) as Mammer
- Nepal Jitranon as Wanwaew
- Sunthari Chotipun (Nong) as Teacher Da
- Narumon Phongsupap (Koy) as Toon's mother
