= Irresistible (TV series) =

2021 Thai television series by Tanwarin Sukkhapisit

- Official series poster
- Thai: สั่งใจให้หยุดรักเธอ
- Genre: Romance; Revenge drama; Procedural drama
- Based on: Mia Nok Hua Jai (เมียนอกหัวใจ) by Chalalai (ชลาลัย)
- Directed by: Tanwarin Sukkhapisit
- Starring: Thanat Lowkhunsombat; Sushar Manaying
- Opening theme: "Forever You" by Aye Sarunchana
- Country of origin: Thailand
- Original language: Thai
- No. of episodes: 22

Production
- Running time: 47 minutes
- Production companies: GMMTV; GoodBoy Entertainment

Original release
- Network: GMM 25; Viu
- Release: 4 October – 14 December 2021

Related
- Mia Nok Hua Jai (1987); Mia Nok Hua Jai (1994); Roy Ruk Raeng Kaen (2015)

Irresistible (Thai: สั่งใจให้หยุดรักเธอ; RTGS: Sang Jai Hai Yut Rak Thoe) is a Thai television series directed by Tanwarin Sukkhapisit (Golf), starring Thanat Lowkhunsombat (Lee) and Sushar Manaying (Aom).

Adapted from the Thai novel Mia Nok Hua Jai (เมียนอกหัวใจ) by Chalalai (ชลาลัย) and produced by GMMTV together with GoodBoy Entertainment, it was announced as one of the television series of GMMTV for 2021 during their "GMMTV2021: The New Decade Begins" event on December 3, 2020. It officially premiered on GMM 25 and Viu on October 4, 2021, and ran until December 14, 2021.

== Synopsis ==
Driven by the idea that human motivation relies entirely on love or revenge, Kimhan (Lee Thanat) chooses the latter after his world shatters. The tragedy began when he discovered his sister, Vimonrat (Ploy Chidjun), dead a year ago from a gunshot wound in an apartment staged to look like a suicide by her husband, Thada (Pai Partith). Following the murder, Kimhan learns of the couple's recent marital problems and confronts Thada, who managed to flee the authorities. Thada denies any involvement, and his claim is supported by Mookrin (Aom Sushar), his sister and Kimhan's lover. Devastated by his sister's death and Mookrin's defense of the prime suspect, Kimhan becomes convinced that his lover is covering up her brother's crimes. He subsequently resolves to seek justice himself, targeting both Thada and Mookrin for their betrayal.

One year later, on the wedding day of Kimhan and Mookrin, Kimhan initiates his calculated plot for revenge. In a shocking twist, Mookrin is replaced at the altar by her own friend, Paktra (Grand Kornpassorn), publicly humiliating Mookrin and infuriating Thada. Ignoring Thada's rage, Kimhan openly declares war, stating that this public disgrace is merely the opening move in seeking justice for Vimonrat's death. As their fierce conflict escalates, Thada's past crimes near exposure. Amid this rising tension, Kimhan and Mookrin are forced to face their unresolved feelings, proving whether their love can survive the devastating cycle of hatred and retribution.

== Cast and characters ==
=== Main ===
- Thanat Lowkhunsombat (Lee) as Kimhan "Kim"
- Sushar Manaying (Aom) as Mookarin "Mook"

=== Supporting ===
- Kornpassorn Duaysianklao (Grand) as Paktra
- Nut Devahastin Na Ayudhya as Prarot
- Phatchatorn Thanawat (Ployphach) as Plaifon
- Thanaboon Wanlopsirinun (Na) as Chumsai
- Ploynira Hiruntaveesin (Kapook) as Gina
- Partith Pisitkul (Pai) as Thada
- Chidjun Hung (Ploy) as Vimonrat "Vi"
- Virahya Pattarachokchai (Gina) as Duangdao
- Sivakorn Lertchuchot (Guy) as Xia Ah
- Kanuengpim Thanaphitchakorn (Nhim) as Nate
- Kemika Sukkhaprasongdi (Pep) as Burger
- Sirilux Songsri (Samina) as Mona

=== Guest ===
- Tanwarin Sukkhapisit (Golf) as street vendor
- Patson Sarindu (Pat) as Att
- Kanokkarn Chulthong (Forjune) as Bonus

== Soundtrack ==
| Song title | Artist | Ref. |
|---|---|---|
| Forever You | Aye Sarunchana | |
