= Patchata Janngeon =

Thai actor (born 1996)

- ภัชทา จันทร์เงิน
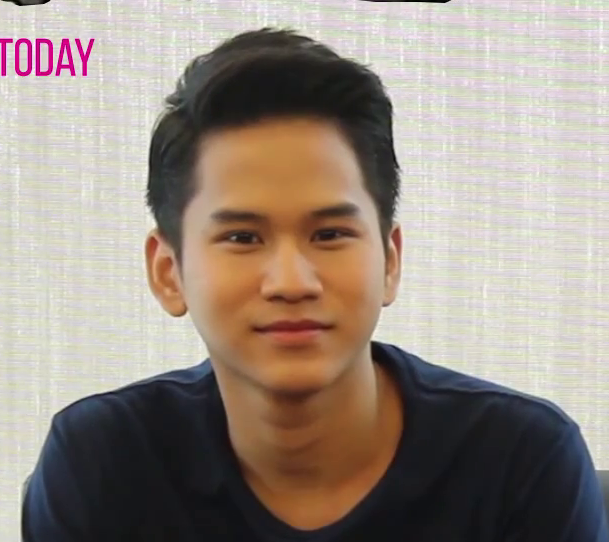
- Patchata being interviewed in 2014
- Born: พัทธดนย์ จันทร์เงิน; 22 October 1996 (age 29); Chiang Mai, Thailand
- Other name: Fiat
- Education: Communication Arts Sripatum University (Bangkhen)
- Occupations: Actor; singer; dancer
- Years active: 2013–present
- Known for: Tee in Grean Fictions; Dae in SOTUS S; Korn in The Gifted

Patchata Janngeon (Thai: ภัชทา จันทร์เงิน; born 22 October 1996), formerly Pattadon Janngeon (Thai: พัทธดนย์ จันทร์เงิน), nicknamed Fiat (Thai: เฟียต), is a Thai actor, singer and dancer. He is known for his main role as Tee in the film Grean Fictions (2013) and supporting roles as Dae in SOTUS S (2017) and Korn in The Gifted (2018).

== Early life and education ==
Patchata was born in Chiang Mai, Thailand. He attended Montfort College for his primary and secondary education. In 2019, he graduated with a bachelor's degree in film and digital media from the Faculty of Communication Arts in Sripatum University Bangkhen Main Campus where he was a first-class honor.

== Filmography ==
=== Film ===
Year	Title	Role	Notes	Ref.
2013	Grean Fictions	Tee	Main role	
2014	1448 Love Among Us	Fiat	Support role	
2015	Love Confession	Tee	Main role	
2022	The World of Killing People		Main role	

=== Television ===
Year	Title	Role	Notes	Ref.
2013	Carabao The Series		Main role	
2014	Greanhouse	Tee	Main role	
2016	Little Big Dream		Guest role	
2017	The U-Prince: The Badly Politics	Fuse	Support role	
2017	Slam Dance	Graph	Support role	
2017	SOTUS S	Dae	Support role	
2018	The Gifted	"Korn" Thanakorn Gorbgoon	Main role	
2019	A Gift For Whom You Hate	Oat	Main role	
2020	Angel Beside Me	Gabriel (Angel)	Support role	
2020	Turn Left Turn Right	James	Support role	
2020	The Gifted: Graduation	"Korn" Thanakorn Gorbgoon	Main role	
2020	My Gear and Your Gown	Pure	Main role	
2021	Girl2K	Kampun	Support role	
2021	Mr. Lipstick	Thanwa	Support role	
2022	The War of Flowers	Wet / Worawet	Main role	
2022	Triage	"Rit" Varit Boonwilai	Support role	
2022	You Are My Missing Piece	Chai	Support role	
2022	School Tales The Series	Korn	Main role	
2023	Return Man	Buai	Support role	
2023	Shadow	Trin Dhevawijitra	Main role	
2024	Every You, Every Me	Ton	Support role	

== Discography ==
Year	Song title	Label	Ref.
2018	"สู้ซ่า" (Soo Za) together with Harit Cheewagaroon & Phuwin Tangsakyuen	GMMTV Records	
2018	"เข้าใจใช่ไหม" (Kao Jai Chai Mai)	GMMTV Records	
2020	"แค่อีกครั้ง" (Kae Ek Krang/Better Man)	GMMTV Records	

== Awards and nominations ==
Key
†	Indicates non-competitive categories

Year	Nominated work	Category	Award	Result	Ref.
2013	Grean Fictions	Best Actor	Bangkok Critics Assembly Awards	Nominated	
2013	Grean Fictions	Best Actor	Starpics Thai Films Awards	Nominated	
2013	Grean Fictions	Best Actor	Suphannahong National Film Awards	Nominated	
2019	—N/a	Male Rising Star †	National Alliance for Tobacco Free Thailand	Won	
