= Napasorn Weerayuttvilai =

Thai actress, singer and doctor (born 1997)

- นภสร วีระยุทธวิไล
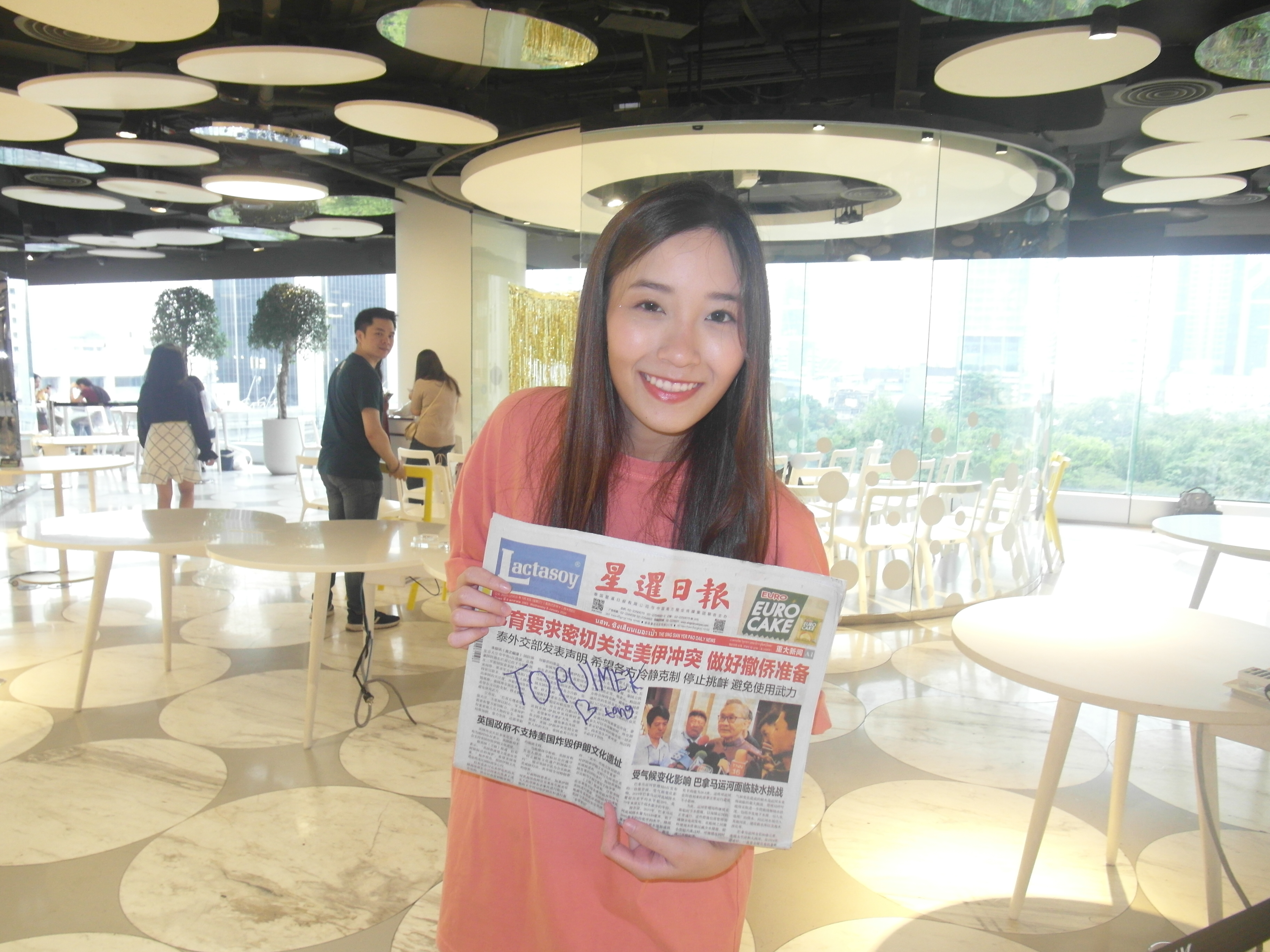
- Napasorn at her birthday party in 2020
- Born: January 20, 1997 (age 29); Bangkok, Thailand
- Other names: Puimek (ปุยเมฆ); Puimekster
- Occupations: Actress; Singer; Doctor
- Years active: 2016–present
- Agents: GMMTV (2017–2022); LOVEiS Entertainment (2023–present)

Napasorn Wirayutthavilai (Thai: นภสร วีระยุทธวิไล, RTGS: Naphason Wirayutthawilai; born 20 January 1997), nicknamed Puimek (ปุยเมฆ), is a Thai actress, singer, and licensed medical doctor. She gained recognition for her performances in several popular Thai television series, including Turn Left Turn Right (2020) as Earn, The Gifted (2020) and The Gifted: Graduation (2020) as Mon, My Dear Loser: Edge of 17 (2017-18) as Ainam, and SOTUS S (2017-18) as Khao Fang.

== Early life and education ==
Napasorn was born in Bangkok, Thailand. In her teens, she started her career as an actress in several music videos and series. Besides working as a full-time actress, Napasorn has also been busy with her studies. She finished and graduated high school at Rajini School and graduated at Rangsit University at the College of Medicine and currently training at Rajavithi Hospital.

== Career ==
Napasorn began her stint in the entertainment industry by shooting and acting on several music videos. In 2017, she debuted as a television actress in the series U-Prince: The Badly Politics as one of the main characters, Princess Karin. In 2023, she joined LOVEiS Entertainment after her contract with GMMTV expired.

== Filmography ==
Television
Year	Title	Native Title	Role	Notes	Ref.
2016	Little Big Dream		Good Example Scene	Guest role	
2017	U-Prince: The Badly Politics	U-Prince Seriesตอน เซอร์เวย์	Princess Karin	Support role	
2017	My Dear Loser: Edge of 17	My Dear Loser รักไม่เอาถ่านตอน Edge of 17	Ainam	Main role	
2017	SOTUS S		Khao Fang	Support role	
2017	My Dear Loser: Happy Ever After	My Dear Loser รักไม่เอาถ่านตอน Happy Ever After	Ainam	Guest role (Ep. 12)	
2018	The Gifted	THE GIFTED นักเรียนพลังกิฟต์	Mon	Main role	
2018	Friend Zone	Friend Zone เอา ให้ ชัด	Claire	Guest role (Ep. 7)	
2018	Yai & The Grandsons		Herself	Guest (Ep. 11-14)	
2018	School Rangers	รถโรงเรียน School Rangers	Herself	Guest (Ep. 39-41)	
2019	Wolf	Wolf เกมล่าเธอ	Yo	Support role	
2019	A Gift For Whom You Hate	ของขวัญเพื่อคนที่คุณเกลียด	Ploy	Main role	
2020	Angel Beside Me	Angel Beside Me เทวดาท่าจะรัก	Angel of Love	Guest role (Ep. 1)	
2020	Turn Left Turn Right	Turn Left Turn Right สมองเลี้ยวซ้าย หัวใจเลี้ยวขวา	Earn	Main role	
2020	Who Are You	Who Are You เธอคนนั้นคือฉันอีกคน	Kannika/ Koykaew	Support Role (Episodes 1-3)	
2020	The Gifted: Graduation		Mon	Main role	
2020	School Rangers	รถโรงเรียน School Rangers	Herself	Guest (Ep. 136, 147-148)	
2020	BRAND's Summer Camp		Herself	Regular member	
2021	Not Me		TBA	Support role	
2021	55:15		TBA		
2022	You Are My Missing Piece				
2022	Manee Morana				

== Discography ==
MUSIC VIDEO APPEARANCES
Year	Title	Singer/Band
2017	ดีต่อใจ	มาตัง The Star 11
2017	อย่าทำร้าย	ปุริม รัตนเรืองวัฒนา
2019	คนพิเศษ	แม็กซ์ เจนมานะ
2020	All I want for Christmas is you (Cover : Korean Version)	Kyutae Oppa
