= Home School (Thai TV series) =

2023 Thai television series

- Official series poster
- Thai: Home School – นักเรียนต้องขัง
- Genre: Mystery; Thriller; Suspense
- Directed by: Kanittha Kwunyoo
- Starring: Jirawat Sutivanichsak; Hirunkit Changkham; Methika Jiranorraphat; Rachanun Mahawan; Wachirawit Ruangwiwat; Kay Lertsittichai; Juthapich Indrajundra; Pattranite Limpatiyakorn; Benyapa Jeenprasom; Sureeyares Yakares; Chayapol Jutamas; Chayakorn Jutamas; Thanathat Tanjararak; Atthaphan Phunsawat
- Country of origin: Thailand
- Original language: Thai
- No. of episodes: 18

Production
- Executive producer: Sataporn Panichraksapong
- Running time: 55 minutes
- Production companies: GMMTV; Nar-ra-tor

Original release
- Network: GMM25; Prime Video
- Release: 9 June – 4 August 2023

Home School (Thai: Home School – นักเรียนต้องขัง; Home School – Nakrian Tongkhang, lit. Home School: Students Must Be Imprisoned) is a 2023 Thai television series starring Jirawat Sutivanichsak (Dew), Hirunkit Changkham (Nani), Methika Jiranorraphat (Jane), Rachanun Mahawan (Film), Wachirawit Ruangwiwat (Chimon), Kay Lertsittichai, Juthapich Indrajundra (Jamie), Pattranite Limpatiyakorn (Love), Benyapa Jeenprasom (View), Sureeyares Yakares (Prigkhing), Chayapol Jutamas (AJ), Chayakorn Jutamas (JJ), Thanathat Tanjararak (Indy), and Atthaphan Phunsawat (Gun).

Directed by Kanittha Kwunyoo (Fon) and produced by GMMTV together with Nar-ra-tor, this series aired on GMM25 and Prime Video from 9 June 2023 to 4 August 2023.

== Synopsis ==
'Home School' is a new alternative boarding school set in the middle of a remote forest. Every three years, 13 students who meet the school's qualifications will be chosen to follow a special curriculum. For the full three years, the students are made to properly behave in Home School, facing stringent restrictions and discipline. What was presented as a luxurious boarding school turns out to be a "prison" for the children.

== Cast and characters ==
=== Main ===
- Jirawat Sutivanichsak (Dew) as Nai
- Methika Jiranorraphat (Jane) as White
- Hirunkit Changkham (Nani) as Tibet
- Rachanun Mahawan (Film) as Maki
- Wachirawit Ruangwiwat (Chimon) as Pennueng
- Kay Lertsittichai as Hugo
- Juthapich Indrajundra (Jamie) as Jingjai
- Benyapa Jeenprasom (View) as Fuji
- Pattranite Limpatiyakorn (Love) as Phleng
- Sureeyares Yakares (Prigkhing) as Biw
- Chayapol Jutamas (AJ) as Mek
- Chayakorn Jutamas (JJ) as Mork
- Thanathat Tanjararak (Indy) as Jean
- Atthaphan Phunsawat (Gun) as Run
- Nappon Gomarachun as Master Amin
- Cindy Sirinya Bishop as Headmaster Yani
- Nueng Chalad Na Songkhla as Master Prasat

=== Supporting ===
- Nattharinphon Phrommin (In) as Master Deluxe
- Chotiros Kaewpinit (Sobee) as Phraephon
- Phromphiriya Thongputtaruk (Papang) as Master Champ
- Chotpipat Suttijun (Deaw) as Phoban (housekeeper)

=== Guest ===
- Machida Sutthikulphanich (Maki) as young Maki (Ep. 1–2, 11)
- Suchada Poonpattanasuk (Hong) as Sunitra (Ep. 1, 4, 10)
- Sornchai Chatwiriyachai (Chua) as Manas (Ep. 1, 4, 10, 17–18)
- Surasak Chaiat (Nu) as Metha (Ep. 1, 5, 10, 17–18)
- Kittipol Kesmanee (Pu) as Phoj (Ep. 1, 9–10)
- Chalee Immak as Bird (Ep. 1, 10, 17–18)
- Naruemon Phongsupap (Koy) as Vivian (Ep. 6, 10)
- Krisada Phatcharapiphat (Ya) as Songyos (Jean's father) (Ep. 8, 17–18)
- Natthaphichamon Singkharawat (Yongyi) as Jinda (Ep. 10)
- Santi Santiwetchakun (Game) as Bodin (Ep. 11–14)
- Sukol Sasijulaka (Jome) as Master Phut (Ep. 11, 14, 17)
- Ployshompoo Supasap (Jan) as Phinya (Ep. 12–13)
- Archen Aydin (Joong) as young Amin (Ep. 12–13)
- Harit Cheewagaroon (Sing) as young Bodin (Ep. 12–13)
- Thanawat Rattanakitpaisan (Khaotung) as Zero (Ep. 18)

Episode	Title
01	Term Begins
02	Duck
03	Punishment
04	Liar
05	Exam
06	The Question
07	The Rules
08	Lizard
09	Cruel
10	Family
11	Masters
12	Cure
13	The Past
14	Run
15	Truth
16	Monster
17	Project R
18	Home
