= Nichaphat Chatchaipholrat =

Thai actress and singer (born 1995)

- ณิชาภัทร ฉัตรชัยพลรัตน์
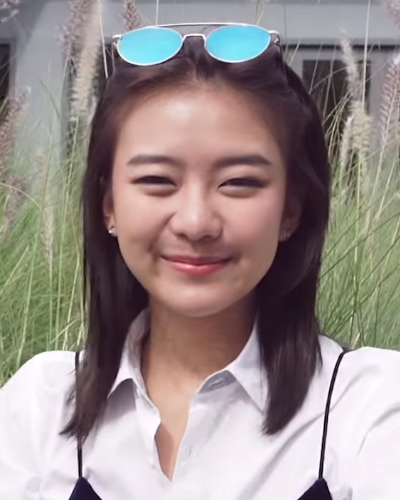
- Chatchaipholrat from Game of Teens 2017
- Born: 17 September 1995 (age 31); Khon Kaen, Thailand
- Other name: Pearwah (แพรวา)
- Occupations: Actress; singer; model
- Years active: 2013–present
- Agents: Nadao Bangkok (2013–2021); Freelance (2021–present)
- Notable work: Hormones: The Series

Nichaphat Chatchaipholrat (Thai: ณิชาภัทร ฉัตรชัยพลรัตน์, RTGS: Nichaphat Chatchaiphonrat; born 17 September 1995), nicknamed Pearwah (Thai: แพรวา; RTGS: Phrae Wa), is a Thai actress and singer who is known for her role as Kanompang in Hormones: The Series and Boyo in Friend Zone The Series and Friend Zone 2: Dangerous Area.

== Early life and career ==
Nichaphat was born on 17 September 1995 in Khon Kaen, Thailand. She joined the Hormones The Next Gen audition and she made it to the Top 12 and later became part of the Top 5. She debuted as an actress in the second season of Hormones: The Series as Kanompang in 2014. The same year she also acted in another series ThirTEEN Terrors.

In 2015, Nichaphat reprised her role as Kanompang in the third season of Hormones: The Series. She also had a guest role in Stupid Cupid: The Series and the main role of Khaiwan in Lovey Dovey.

"Love Siren", a song she and Paris Intarakomalyasut sang as one of the official soundtrack for My Ambulance, was hailed as one of the "two biggest Thai songs" of 2019 and was featured in the "One Love Asia" fundraising event of UNICEF for those affected in Asia by COVID-19.

It was announced last 19 February 2021 via a Facebook post by Nadao Bangkok that Nichaphat is leaving Nadao Music and Nadao Bangkok and would hence work as a freelance actress and singer.

On 20 August 2021 it was announced that she has joined High Cloud Entertainment as a solo artist. [7]

== Filmography ==
=== Television ===
Year	Title	Role	Notes	Ref.
2014	Hormones: The Series (Season 2)	Kanompang	Supporting role	
2014	ThirTEEN Terrors	Palm	Main role	
2015	Stupid Cupid: The Series	young Grandmother	Guest role	
2015	Hormones: The Series (Season 3)	Kanompang	Main role	
2016	Lovey Dovey	Khaiwan	Main role	
2016	Bang Rak Soi 9/1	Yuki	Guest role	
2017	The Cupids Series: Sorn Ruk Kammathep		Supporting role	
2017	The Cupids Series: Kammathep Sorn Kol		Supporting role	
2017	Love Songs Love Series: Sing Khong	Bam	Main role	
2018	Friend Zone	Boyo	Main role	
2019	Korn Aroon Ja Roong	Aroonchai	Main role	
2019	Wolf	Pauline	Guest role	
2019	Great Men Academy	Orange	Guest role	
2019	Bangkok Buddies	Vanessa	Main role	
2019	The Stranded	Mint	Supporting role	
2020	Quarantine Stories	Kwang	Main role	
2020	Friend Zone 2: Dangerous Area	Boyo	Main role	
2022	P.S. I Hate You	Phantiwa Thantiwicha (Prae)	Guest role	
2023	Tee Sood Kong Huajai	Ked	Main role	
2023	Wongsakanayat	Namthan	Main role	
2023	Rak Thuam Thung	Marasri	Main role	
2026	Mr. Fanboy	Cher	Supporting role	
2026	Police in Love	Belle	Guest role	

=== Films ===
Year	Title	Role	Notes	Ref.
2025	Tha Rae: The Exorcist	Malee	Debut film	
