= The Warp Effect =

2022–23 Thai television series

- Official series poster
- Thai: รูปลับรหัสวาร์ป
- Genre: Comedy drama; Sex comedy; Teen drama
- Directed by: Tichakorn Phukhaotong
- Starring: Thitipoom Techaapaikhun; Yongwaree Anilbol; Harit Cheewagaroon; Ployshompoo Supasap; Chanunphat Kamolkiriluck; Rutricha Phapakithi; Phuwin Tangsakyuen; Pavida Moriggi
- Opening theme: "Sweet but Naughty" by Fluke Gawin
- Country of origin: Thailand
- Original language: Thai
- No. of episodes: 12

Production
- Running time: 50 minutes
- Production companies: GMMTV; Hard Feeling Film

Original release
- Network: GMM 25; Viu
- Release: 22 December 2022 – 27 February 2023

The Warp Effect (Thai: รูปลับรหัสวาร์ป; RTGS: Rup Lap Rahat Warp) is a Thai teen sex comedy drama television series starring Thitipoom Techaapaikhun (New), Yongwaree Anilbol (Fah), Harit Cheewagaroon (Sing), Ployshompoo Supasap (Jan), Chanunphat Kamolkiriluck (Gigie), Rutricha Phapakithi (Ciize), Phuwin Tangsakyuen, and Pavida Moriggi (Silvy). Directed by Tichakorn Phukhaotong (Jojo) and produced by GMMTV together with Hard Feeling Film, it was announced as one of the television series of GMMTV for 2022 during their "GMMTV2022: BORDERLESS" event held on December 1, 2021. It officially premiered on GMM 25 and Viu on December 22, 2022, and ran until February 27, 2023.

== Synopsis ==
Alex (New Thitipoom), an insecure 17-year-old photography enthusiast, lives with his younger brother Ice (Phuwin Tangsakyuen) under a strict promise to their late mother to remain a virgin until he turns 18. Feeling left behind by his friends, the nerdy See-ew (Sing Harit) and the cool lesbian Nim (Jan Ployshompoo), Alex decides to break his vow at a high school party hosted by Jedi (Mark Pakin). At the party, he meets Jean (Fah Yongwaree), a sassy feminist, to whom he seemingly loses his virginity. However, the next morning, Alex wakes up with complete amnesia of the night's events and finds out he has been mysteriously warped into the body of a 27-year-old gynecologist and sexology expert. To return to his original time, Alex must navigate his new adult life while piecing together the events of that night using a cryptic Polaroid photo.

== Cast and characters ==
=== Main ===
- Thitipoom Techaapaikhun (New) as Alex
- Yongwaree Anilbol (Fah) as Jean

=== Supporting ===
- Harit Cheewagaroon (Sing) as See-ew
- Ployshompoo Supasap (Jan) as Nim
- Chanunphat Kamolkiriluck (Gigie) as Kat
- Rutricha Phapakithi (Ciize) as Liu
- Phuwin Tangsakyuen as Ice
- Pavida Moriggi (Silvy) as Molly
- Pusit Dittapisit (Fluke) as Army
- Archen Aydin (Joong) as Tony
- Thinnaphan Tantui (Thor) as Jo
- Chaleeda Gilbert as Kim
- Pakin Kunaanuwit (Mark) as Jedi
- Jeera Jareonthamasuk (Best) as Rose

=== Guest ===
- Pongphan Petchbuntoon (Louis) as Saran (Ep. 1, 6, 11–12)
- Penpetch Benyakul (Jab) as Alex and Ice's father (Ep. 1–2, 11–12)
- Soontorn Meesri (Jim) as Alex and Ice's grandfather (Ep. 1, 12)
- Banchorn Vorasataree (Pepzi) as filmmaker (Ep. 2, 4–5)
- Jessica Pasaphan as Bew (Nim's girlfriend) (Ep. 3–8)
- Jatuporn Dangurai (Jay) as Cha Yen (Ep. 4)
- Sivakorn Lertchuchot (Guy) as Captain (Ep. 5, 7–8)
- Chertsak Pratumsrisakhon as Siam (Ep. 5)

== Soundtrack ==
Song title	Artist	Ref.
Sweet but Naughty	Fluke Gawin	
Safe Zone	Sing Harit	
