= Mr. Lipstick =

2021 Thai television series

- Official series poster
- Thai: แต้มรัก
- Genre: Romantic comedy
- Based on: Taem Rak (แต้มรัก) by Pakbung (ผักบุ้ง)
- Directed by: Ekkasit Trakulkasemsuk
- Starring: Arak Amornsupasiri; Sushar Manaying
- Opening theme: "เมื่อไหร่จะถึงใจเธอ" by Aye Sarunchana
- Country of origin: Thailand
- Original language: Thai
- No. of episodes: 14

Production
- Running time: 47 minutes
- Production companies: GMMTV; Keng Kwang Kang Waisai

Original release
- Network: GMM 25; Viu
- Release: 24 March – 13 May 2021

Mr. Lipstick (Thai: แต้มรัก; RTGS: Taem Rak) is a Thai romantic comedy television series directed by Ekkasit Trakulkasemsuk (Koo), starring Arak Amornsupasiri (Pae) and Sushar Manaying (Aom). Adapted from the novel of the same name by Pakbung (ผักบุ้ง) and produced by GMMTV together with Keng Kwang Kang Waisai, it was announced as one of the television series of GMMTV for 2021 during their "GMMTV2021: The New Decade Begins" event on December 3, 2020. It officially premiered on GMM 25 and Viu on March 24, 2021, and ran until May 13, 2021.

== Synopsis ==
Kumarika (Aom Sushar), an aspiring teacher, suffers an unfortunate start to her teaching career after a bitter argument with Mom Rajawongse Noppakhun (Pae Arak), the prestigious heir to the school's founder. Although Kumarika initially believes Nopakhun dislikes her, she unexpectedly captures his heart, prompting him to pursue her despite his high social status.

Their blossoming romance faces immediate backlash due to their significant social differences, as outsiders refuse to believe that a wealthy nobleman would be serious with the daughter of an ordinary restaurant owner. Furthermore, the couple must overcome numerous challenges, including constant sabotage from Noppakhun's family and interference from Kumarika's two mischievous older brothers.

== Cast and characters ==
=== Main ===
- Arak Amornsupasiri (Pae) as M.R. Nopphakhun Kunabordin "Khun Chai Kao"
- Sushar Manaying (Aom) as Kumarika "Mod"

=== Supporting ===
- Prachakorn Piyasakulkaew (Sun) as Tul
- Sakonrut Woraurai (Four) as Wirongraong "Wi"
- Na Chat Juntapun (Nicky) as Khetchon "Mhee" (Mod's brother)
- Chatchawit Techarukpong (Victor) as Khetpana "Muek" (Mod's brother)
- Phol Tantasathien as Panat (Mod, Muek, and Mhee's father)
- Sueangsuda Lawanprasert (Namfon) as Mullika (Mod, Muek, and Mhee's mother)
- Natha Lloyd (Mai) as Nongnaphat "Kaew" (Khun Chai Kao's sister)
- Ampa Phusit (Aew) as Srinuan
- Patchata Janngeon (Fiat) as Thanwa "Than" (Tul's brother)
- Ployshompoo Supasap (Jan) as Pijika "PiPi" (Tul's sister)
- Wanwimol Jaenasavamethee (June) as Dujdao (Than's friend)

== Soundtrack ==
Song title	Artist	Ref.
เมื่อไหร่จะถึงใจเธอ	Aye Sarunchana	
