= The War of Flowers =

2022 Thai television series by Tanwarin Sukkhapisit

- Official series poster
- Thai: สงครามดอกไม้
- Genre: Romance; Revenge drama
- Directed by: Tanwarin Sukkhapisit
- Starring: Metinee Kingpayome; Sonia Couling; Perawat Sangpotirat; Sarunchana Apisamaimongkol; Atthaphan Phunsawat; Wanwimol Jaenasavamethee; Patchata Janngeon; Duangdao Jarujinda; Deuntem Salitul
- Opening theme: "ยอม" by Aye Sarunchana
- Country of origin: Thailand
- Original language: Thai
- No. of episodes: 18

Production
- Running time: 45 minutes
- Production companies: GMMTV; GoodBoy Entertainment

Original release
- Network: GMM 25; Viu
- Release: 14 February – 12 April 2022

The War of Flowers (Thai: สงครามดอกไม้; RTGS: Song Khram Dok Mai) is a Thai television series starring Metinee Kingpayome (Lukkade), Sonia Couling (Pim), Perawat Sangpotirat (Krist), Sarunchana Apisamaimongkol (Aye), Atthaphan Phunsawat (Gun), Wanwimol Jaenasavamethee (June), Patchata Janngeon (Fiat), Duangdao Jarujinda (Dao), and Deuntem Salitul (Tuk). Directed by Tanwarin Sukkhapisit (Golf) and produced by GMMTV together with GoodBoy Entertainment, it was announced as one of the television series of GMMTV for 2021 during their "GMMTV2021: The New Decade Begins" event on December 3, 2020. It officially premiered on GMM 25 and Viu on February 14, 2022, and ran until April 12, 2022.

== Synopsis ==
A multigenerational rivalry between two families develops into a bitter war, ignited by decades of hostility and conflict. Ornnapa (Tuk Deuntem), the mistress to the owner of the nation's largest flower business, endures years of constant harassment from his first wife, Kannika (Dao Duangdao). Following the husband's death, Kannika expels Ornnapa from the estate, fueling a deep-seated hatred. This long-standing feud is passed down through the generations, remaining unresolved for over thirty years.

The conflict reignites when Ornnapa returns to reclaim what she believes her family rightfully deserves. She is accompanied by her daughter, Onsalao (Pim Sonia), and her grandsons, Worakorn (Krist Perawat) and Worawet (Fiat Patchata), targeting Kannika's family, which now includes her daughter, Thantawan (Lukkade Metinee), and her grandchildren, Mintra (Aye Sarunchana), Nontree (Gun Atthaphan), and Iris (June Wanwimol). As both factions clash, the escalating feud and widespread betrayal threaten to destroy both lineages.

== Cast and characters ==
=== Main ===
- Metinee Kingpayome (Lukkade) as Thantawan "Tawan" Budsababan
- Sonia Couling (Pim) as Onsalao "On"
- Perawat Sangpotirat (Krist) as Worakorn "Korn"
- Sarunchana Apisamaimongkol (Aye) as Mintra "Min" Thepwattanapaisan
- Atthaphan Phunsawat (Gun) as Nontree "Non"
- Wanwimol Jaenasavamethee (June) as Iris "Ai"
- Patchata Janngeon (Fiat) as Worawet "Wet"
- Duangdao Jarujinda (Dao) as Kannika "Klin" Budsababan
- Deuntem Salitul (Tuk) as Ornnapa "Napa"

=== Supporting ===
- Ruengrit McIntosh (Willie) as Warut "Rut"
- Apinan Prasertwattanakul (M) as Cheewin "Win" Thepwattanapaisan
- Chinnarat Siriphongchawalit (Mike) as Namchiao "Nam"
- Paweena Chariffskul (Jeab) as Dala "Chor"
- Pawornwan Verapuchong (Ava) as Yogurt (Ai's friend)
- Malys Choeysobhon (Nueng) as Somrak
- Jarusiri Phuwanai (Tu) as Prae
- Wayne Falconer as Phalop
- Aranya Pathumthong (Pui) as Priew
- Peter Tuinstra as Michael
- Preeyaphat Lawsuwansiri (Earn) as Ai's friend

=== Guest ===
- Thitipong Sangngey (Fort) as Ai's friend (Ep. 3)
- Kittipol Kesmanee (Pu) as Iris' client (Ep. 11–12)
- Tanwarin Sukkhapisit (Golf) as Miss Lily (Ep. 14–16)
- Arthur Gagnaux (Attila) as Morse
