= The Ex-Morning =

2025 Thai television series

- Official series poster
- Thai: เพราะแฟนเก่าเปลี่ยนแปลงบ่อย
- Genre: Comedy Romance
- Written by: Pongsate Lucksameepong; Pratchaya Thavornthummarat; Kornprom Niyomsilp
- Directed by: Phadung Samajarn
- Starring: Perawat Sangpotirat; Prachaya Ruangroj
- Country of origin: Thailand
- Original language: Thai
- No. of episodes: 10

Production
- Production companies: GMMTV; Dream Dimension

Original release
- Network: GMM 25; Viu
- Release: May 22 – July 24, 2025

The Ex-Morning (Thai: เพราะแฟนเก่าเปลี่ยนแปลงบ่อย; RTGS: Phro Faen Kao Plianplaeng Boi) is a 2025 Thai romantic drama television series starring Perawat Sangpotirat (Krist) and Prachaya Ruangroj (Singto). Directed by Phadung Samajarn (Lit) and produced by GMMTV together with Dream Dimension, it was announced at the GMMTV 2024: UP&ABOVE Part 2 event on April 23, 2024. It premiered on GMM 25 on May 22, 2025, and ran until July 24, 2025. It is also available for streaming on Viu.

== Synopsis ==
The series follows the story of Phi (Perawat Sangpotirat), a renowned and somewhat arrogant broadcast reporter whose career takes a dramatic nosedive after a video of him publicly yelling at his co-workers goes viral, severely tarnishing his reputation. To salvage his image and rebuild his career, he is reluctantly assigned to work with a new producer. This new collaboration proves to be an immense challenge when he discovers that the producer is none other than his ex-boyfriend Tam (Prachaya Ruangroj). As they navigate the complexities of working together, professional obligations clash with unresolved feelings, leading to a journey of potential reconciliation and rediscovery of their past relationship.

== Cast and characters ==
=== Main ===
- Perawat Sangpotirat (Krist) as Pathaphi Sinan (Phi)

A once-revered broadcast reporter whose career faces ruin.

- Prachaya Ruangroj (Singto) as Tamtawan Anandabhum (Tam/Tawan)

Padtaphi's ex-boyfriend and the new producer assigned to help him.

=== Supporting ===
- Juthapich Indrajundra (Jamie) as Gaogie
- Preeyaphat Lawsuwansiri (Earn) as Nhudee
- Thanaboon Kiatniran (Aou) as Treenat Jarusakkul (Tae)
- Suphakorn Sriphothong (Pod) as Suwit
- Pathit Pisitkul (Pai) as Yong
- Tachakorn Boonlupyanun (Godji) as Rita (Yong's secretary)
- Kanlaya Lerdkasemsub (Ngek) as Wari
- Kwanrudee Klomklorm (Kwan) as Sa (Tam's mother)

=== Guest ===
- Thitiwat Ritprasert (Ohm) as Paul
- Phatchatorn Thanawat (Ployphach)
- Sahaphap Wongratch (Mix) as Vet (Ep. 7)

== Production ==
The Ex-Morning is produced by GMMTV, a prominent Thai entertainment company known for its diverse range of television series, including numerous successful Boys' Love (BL) dramas. The series is directed by Lit Phadung Samajarn. Filming for The Ex-Morning concluded prior to its premiere, generating significant buzz among fans, particularly due to the reunion of Krist and Singto, who previously gained international fame for their roles in the 2016 BL series SOTUS. This reunion is highlighted as a primary reason to watch the series, building on their established popularity.

== Release ==
The series premiered on May 22, 2025, airing on GMM 25 in Thailand. Episodes are also available for streaming internationally on various platforms such as YouTube (GMMTV's official channel), Viu, and Rakuten TV, often with English subtitles. The series consists of 10 episodes, with the final episode scheduled to air on July 24, 2025.

== Fan meeting ==
To mark the conclusion of the series, a fan meeting titled "เพราะแฟนเก่าเปลี่ยนแปลงบ่อย Final EP. FAN MEETING" (The Ex-Morning Final EP. FAN MEETING) will be held on Thursday, July 24, 2025, starting from 5:00 PM (17:00) at Siam Pavalai Royal Grand Theatre, Paragon Cineplex, 6th floor, Siam Paragon. The event will feature a special screening of the final episode, a special show, and interviews with the cast and director Phadung Samajarn. Tickets for the event, priced at 2,500, 2,000, and 1,500 Thai Baht, went on sale on Saturday, July 12, 2025, at 10:00 AM via ThaiTicketMajor.

== Original soundtrack ==
The official soundtrack for The Ex-Morning features:

- "Morning Love" (รักก็ได้) by Krist Perawat, Singto Prachaya
- "Renew" (แก้ข่าว) by Krist Perawat
- "Dreaming of an Ex" (ฝันถึงแฟนเก่า) by Three Man Down
- "Consent" (ความเจ็บที่รัก) by Singto Prachaya
