= Tanutchai Wijitvongtong =

Thai actor (born 1997)

- ธนัชชัย วิจิตรวงศ์ทอง
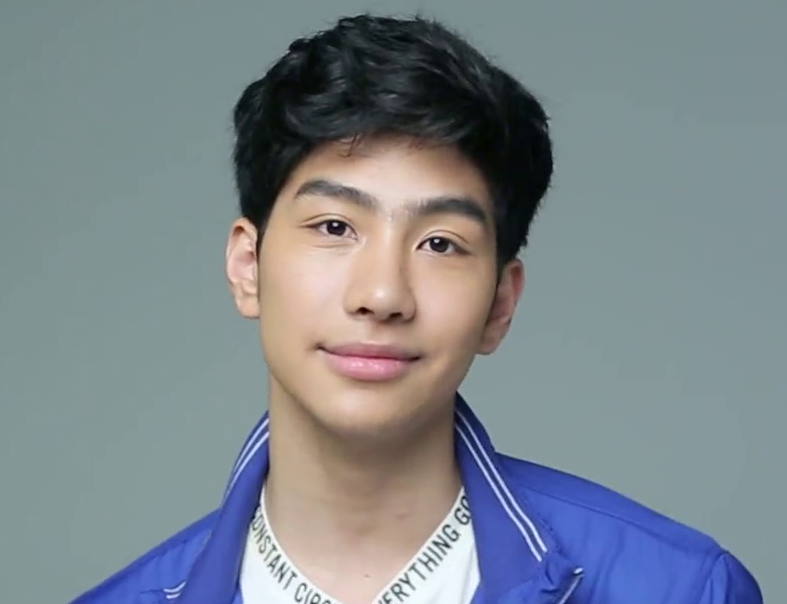
- Tanutchai in 2015
- Born: 25 January 1997 (age 29); Bangkok, Thailand
- Other names: Mond; Tanutchai Vijitvongthong
- Education: Bangkok University Faculty of Communication Arts
- Occupation: Actor
- Years active: 2017–present
- Agent: GMMTV
- Known for: Por in Fabulous 30: The Series; Matt in Kiss Me Again; Badz in Boy For Rent
- Relatives: Chalida Vijitvongthong (sister)

Tanutchai Wijitvongtong (Thai: ธนัชชัย วิจิตรวงศ์ทอง; born 25 January 1997), nicknamed Mond (Thai: ม่อน), is a Thai actor. He is known for his roles GMMTV's Fabulous 30: The Series (2017), Kiss Me Again (2018), Boy For Rent (2019).

== Life and career ==
Tanutchai was born in Bangkok, Thailand to a Thai-Chinese father and a Thai-Indian mother. He is the third child among his siblings, one of which is Chalida Vijitvongthong (Mint), an actress and model. He completed his elementary education at Maepra Fatima School. He started his lower secondary education at Sri Ayudhya School but later transferred to Srinakharinwirot University where he graduated. He was sent by his family to study in India but encountered some problems and had to return to Thailand where he took up and passed the General Educational Development (GED) examination, an equivalent of completing the secondary education level. In 2019, he graduated with a bachelor's degree in communication arts at Bangkok University.

== Filmography ==
=== Television ===
Key
†	Denotes television productions that have not yet been released

Year	Title	Role	Notes	Ref.
2017	Water Boyy	Kluay	Supporting role	
2017	Fabulous 30: The Series	Por	Main role	
2018	School Rangers	Himself	Main host	
2018	Kiss Me Again	Matt	Main role	
2018	The Judgement	Namnhao / Namnuea	Supporting role	
2019	Boy For Rent	Badz	Main role	
2019	Plara Song Krueng	Nawut	Supporting role	
2020	The Underclass	Tee	Main role	
2020	Saneha Stories Season 3: Bar Host	Dodo	Main role	
2020	Khun Mae Mafia	Thana	Supporting role	
2021	Not Me	Gram	Supporting role	
2022	P.S. I Hate You	Term tapanon Bawonratana	Supporting role	
2022	Midnight Motel	Sun	Main role	
2023	Only Friends	Boeing Kittipon	Supporting role	
2024	Ploy's Yearbook	Kram	Main role	
2025	My Golden Blood	Nakan Amarittrakul	Supporting role	
2025	Hide & Sis	Nathat	Main role	
2025	That Summer	Pheng	Supporting role	
2026	My Romance Scammer	—N/a	Guest role (Ep. 9)	
2026	A Dog and a Plane	"Akkhi" Chatchai Phimaimueang	Supporting role	
2026	Lovers & Gangsters	Tot	Supporting role	
TBA	Blue Print †	TBA	Supporting role	
