= Thanat Lowkhunsombat =

Thai actor and model (born 1993)

- ฐานัฐพ์ โล่ห์คุณสมบัติ
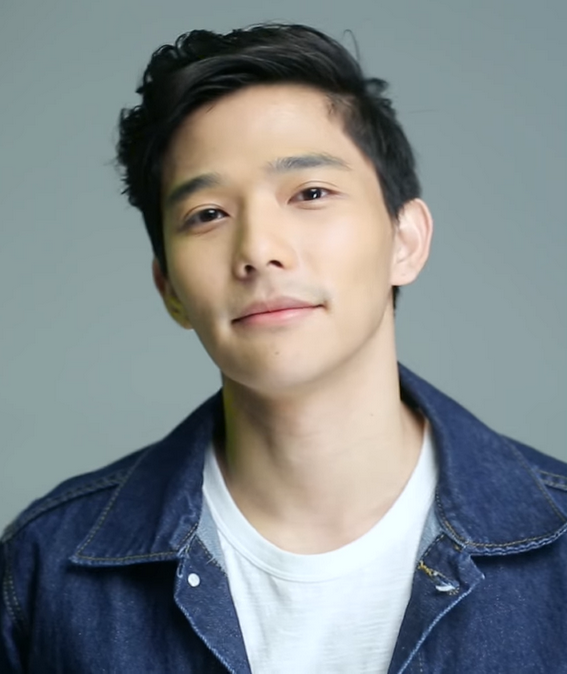
- Thanat in 2017
- Born: Charatpong Lowkhunsombat; 18 January 1993 (age 33); Bangkok, Thailand
- Other name: Lee
- Education: Srinakharinwirot University B.A.: Social Communication Innovation M.F.A.: Fine Arts
- Occupation: Actor
- Years active: 2014–present
- Agent: GMMTV
- Known for: Survey in U-Prince; Play in Secret Seven; Pong in My Dear Loser: Monster Romance

Thanat Lowkhunsombat (Thai: ฐานัฐพ์ โล่ห์คุณสมบัติ; born 18 January 1993), nicknamed Lee (Thai: ลี), is a Thai actor and singer. He began and started his acting career in 2017 playing a main role in the "U-Prince" series after he was declared one of the winners in "Finding U-Prince Project". In 2024, Lee announced his departure from GMMTV.

== Early life and education ==
Thanat was born in Bangkok, Thailand as Charatpong Lowkhunsombat, He completed his secondary education at Suankularb Wittayalai Rangsit School. He graduated with a bachelor's degree in innovative management communication from the College of Social Communication Innovation at Srinakharinwirot University and is currently pursuing a master's degree in fine arts, major in innovative design from the Faculty of Fine Arts at the same university.

Prior to changing his name into Thanat, he initially changed his birth name into Phachon.

== Career ==
He started his acting career in 2014 by playing a main role in Meeting point Then 2016-2017 There is the first series in U-Prince: The Badly Politics after he was declared as one of the winners in the "Finding U-Prince Project". He also took part in CLEO Thailand's 50 Most Eligible Bachelors of 2017 and won as "The Guy with the Most Alluring Move". In the same year, he got the main role of Play in Secret Seven and went on to take part in several television series such as My Dear Loser: Monster Romance, Wake Up Ladies: The Series, Friend Zone, Boy For Rent, and Endless Love.

Currently, he is playing the role of Nont in Rerng Rita.

== Filmography ==
=== Television ===
Year	Title	Role	Notes	Ref.
2014	Meeting point	Telephone operator	Guest role	
2016	U-Prince: The Lovely Geologist	Survey	Guest role	
2016	U-Prince: The Badass Baker	Survey	Guest role	
2016	U-Prince: The Absolute Economist	Survey	Guest role	
2017	U-Prince: The Badly Politics	Survey	Main role	
2017	U-Prince: The Ambitious Boss	Survey	Guest role	
2017	Yutthakan Salat No	Jaokhun	Main role	
2017	My Dear Loser: Edge of 17	Pong	Support role	
2017	Secret Seven	Play	Main role	
2017	My Dear Loser: Monster Romance	Pong	Main role	
2017	My Dear Loser: Happy Ever After	Pong	Guest role	
2018	Wake Up Ladies: The Series	Saifah	Support role	
2018	Social Syndrome	Sin	Main role	
2018	Friend Zone	Good	Main role	
2019	Boy For Rent	Kyro	Main role	
2019	Endless Love	Day	Main role	
2019	One Night Steal	Himself	Guest role	
2019	Club Friday The Series Season 11: Ruk Mai Mee Tua Ton		Main role	
2020	Rerng Rita	Nont	Main role	
2020	The Gifted: Graduation	fake Supot Chueamanee	Guest role	
2020	Friend Zone 2: Dangerous Area	Good	Main role	
2020	Wake Up Ladies: Very Complicated	Saifah	Support role	
2021	Baker Boys	Punn	Main role	
2021	Irresistible	Kimhan	Main role	
2022	Mama Gogo	Chen	Main role	
2022	P.S. I Hate You	Pitch	Main role	

=== Film ===
Year	Title	Role	Rer
2015	Live Liem		turn off Camera 2014

=== Music video appearances ===
- 2016 Sieng Nai Jai (เสียงในใจ) - Pup Potato; Ohm Cocktail (Genierock/YouTube:Genierock)
- 2017 Tot Long Chai (ทดลองใช้) - Pun Basher (Genierock/YouTube:Genierock)
- 2017 Kon Bap Nai Dee (คนแบบไหนดี) Ost.Secret Seven - Bambam The Voice (GMMTV/YouTube:GMMTV RECORDS)
- 2018 Bot Rean Kong Krom Chenh Jai (บทเรียนของความเชื่อใจ) Ost.Wake Up Cha Nee The Series - Ben Chalatit (GMMTV/YouTube:GMMTV RECORDS)
- 2021 (ทิ้งเราทำไม) - Jackfanchan feat. VANGOE (Believe Music/YouTube:Jackfanchan)
- 2022 Jao Ying (เจ้าหญิง) Ost.My Sassy Princess 2022 - Marie Eugenie Le Lay (One Music (ชื่อเดิม : Exact Music)/YouTube:ช่อง one31) Kimmy Chermarin Cole

== Awards ==
Year	Award	Category	Result	Ref.
2018	Attitude Award 7th Anniversary	Actor of the year	Won	
2018	Siamdara Stars Awards 2018	Favorite Star	Won	
2018	Thailand Fever Awards 2017	The Leading Actor Fever	Won	
2018	The role model of Thai society	Person model of Thai society	Won	
2021	Kazz Awards	Young bang of the year	Won	
