= Line TV =

On-demand internet television company

Line TV is a video-on-demand, over-the-top media service owned by Japan-based Line Corporation, operating mainly in Taiwan and previously Thailand. It is a free-to-access, advertisement-supported service available via mobile applications, digital media players, and the World Wide Web. It carries programming from local television networks, and also partners with studios to produce its own original content.

The service launched in Thailand in 2015, becoming the most popular online video platform for local television content, with over 40 million users. It later expanded to Taiwan, and in 2020 to nineteen other territories, mainly in Southeast Asia, Latin America, and the United States. Line TV was instrumental in popularizing the boys' love genre in Thailand as well as exporting such Thai series to overseas audiences. However, the company discontinued the service in Thailand at the end of 2021.

In 2020, Line TV partnered with GagaOOLala, a Taipei-based global LGBT streaming and TV production service to license the latter's content.

== See also ==
- Line (software), Line Corporation's better known messaging application
- Television in Thailand
