= Thirteen Terrors =

2014–15 television series

- Official poster
- Also known as: ThirTEEN Terrors
- เพื่อนเฮี้ยน.. โรงเรียนหลอน
- Genre: Film noir Anthology; Psychological horror Supernatural horror
- Created by: GTH
- Developed by: GTH
- Opening theme: Dead Air Time
- Ending theme: Nung sue run (หนังสือเรียน) (by Cocktail)
- Country of origin: Thailand
- Original language: Thai
- No. of episodes: 13 _{(+ 2 special episodes)}

Production
- Executive producer: Juthamas Kaewchart (จุฑามาส แก้วชาติ)
- Running time: 60 minutes/episode

Original release
- Network: GMM 25; GTH On Air
- Release: November 1, 2014 – February 14, 2015

Thirteen Terrors (stylized as ThirTEEN Terrors and known in Thai as Phuean Hian.. Rongrian Lon (Thai: เพื่อนเฮี้ยน..โรงเรียนหลอน) is a 2014–2015 Thai horror television drama produced by GTH. The series is an anthology of shorts, with thirteen episodes, each by a different director, and follows a school-secrets horror theme. The series was broadcast on the satellite channel GTH On Air and the new digital terrestrial channel GMM 25.

== Episode and Cast ==
=== Episode 0: Halloween Special ===
- The Entire ThirTEEN Terrors Cast

=== Episode 1: Wanida (วนิดา) ===
- Sananthachat Thanapatpisal as Manaswee Thanapatpisan
- Panisara Montharat as Wanida Punya-angkun
- Weeranan Sadakorawongwat as Kornkanok Loetpiriya
- Suraphon Poonpiriya as Teacher
- Nitcha Thitikananon as Manaswee's Mother
- Boonchoo Namjaidee as School security guard

=== Episode 2: Follow to death (ตาย-ตาม) ===
- Sutatta Udomsilp as Im
- Parada Thitawachira as Jen
- Teetatch Ratanasritai as Ball

=== Episode 3: Curse (แช่ง) ===
- Chawinroj Likitcharoensakul as Jo
- Kemisara Paladesh as Aim
- Kanit Wichianwanitchakun as Get / Thachai Kamonploy

=== Episode 4: Unanswered (uninvited) number (สายไม่ได้รับ (เชิญ)) ===
- Thiti Mahayotaruk as Nae
- Napat Chokejindachai as Dew
- Apasiri Nitibhon as Nae's Mother
- Wongravee Nateetorn as Gab
- Nitithorn Akkarachotsophon as Dew's friends

=== Episode 5: Pu Som (ปู่โสม) ===
- Narikun Ketprapakorn as Wan
- Sirinya Tantipongwatthana as Cherry
- Suchada Poonpatthanasuk as Wan's Mother
- Atchariya Kamonpan as Cherry's best friend

=== Episode 6: Beautifully Creepy (สวยสยอง) ===
- Chutavuth Pattarakampol as Aun
- Thunyanun Pipatchaisiri as Fun Promthida Arisuk (in Music)
- Wassana Chalakorn as Sri Aunt
- Chulalak Thepissaradech as Fun (real)
- Natchapongtorn Kesornsuwan as Tot (Aun's Friends)

=== Episode 7: Rule-breaking Night (คืนแหกกฎ) ===
- Sirachuch Chienthavorn as Nut
- Sikarin Setsurapricha as J.
- Chirayus Khaobaimai as Now
- Phakamas Kanchanaburangkoon as Pai
- Theeracha Raiwa as Khem
- Chompoo Prasert as Security guard

=== Episode 8: Secretly Filmed (แอบถ่าย) ===
- Gunn Junhavat as Turk
- Saruda Kietwarawuth as Orm
- Thanyaluck Chokthanadech as Mind
- Natnicha Leuanganankun as Deedee
- Daisuke Sukikawa as Thada Teacher
- Laksanaporn Kotkunthara as Kib

=== Episode 9: Instinct (อจินไตย) ===
- Nichaphat Chatchaipholrat as Palm paradee
- Phawadee Kumchokpaisan as Bee chonthicha
- Pimlapat Surapan as Thip Thipwan
- Narinlaya Kunmongkolpet as View witchuda
- Pimmada Thaisomboonsuk as Abha Teacher

=== Episode 10: Stains (คราบ) ===
- Kanyawee Songmuang as Tong Thitima Kasempaisan
- Chananya Saendech as Praew
- Awat Rattanapintha as Jack
- Chirawat Wachirasaranpat as Teacher Wanchana Srikansakun
- Chinchutha Rattanaburi as Pinto Naphaphorn Wangchertwong/Weerakietdamrong

=== Episode 11: Roommate (เพื่อนร่วมห้อง) ===
- Athittaya Craigg as Nina
- Chanthana Kitiyapan as Su Aunt
- Worawuth Rithreuang as Nina's Uncle
- Alexsandra Abbing as Jamie (Nina's friends)

=== Episode 12: The Sound of Ordering (เสียงตามสาย) ===
- Sarit Tarailoetwichia as Att
- Teeradon Supapunpinyo as Game
- Nareupornkamol Chaisaeng as Dear
- Adithep Anan as Oh
- Theerawuth Hiranyawatthanangkoon as Song
- Thanyaboon Boonprasert as Wisarut
- Sumontha Suanpholrat as Nath Teacher
- Saifa Tanthana as Taweewat Teacher

=== Episode 13: Blue Night (คืนสีน้ำเงิน) ===
- Oabnithi Wiwattanawarang as Poom
- Atthaphan Phunsawat as Tam
- Panatchai Kittisatima as Tam's Brother
- Duangjai Hirunsri as Tam's Mother

=== Episode 14: ThirTEEN Terrors Awards ===
- Napat Chokejindachai as MC
