= List of Thai male actors =

This is a list of Thai male actors. It is customary for Thais to be grouped by their given name, not their family name, even if they have taken a Western name.

== A ==
- Aed Carabao
- Akara Amarttayakul
- Akkaphan Namart
- Alex Rendell
- Amphol Lampoon
- Anan Anwar
- Anan Wong
- Ananda Everingham
- Apisit Opasaimlikit
- Apiwat Ueathavornsuk
- Arak Amornsupasiri
- Archen Aydin
- Artit Somnoei
- Artiwara Kongmalai
- Asanee–Wasan
- Atsadawut Luengsuntorn
- Attachai Anantameak
- Atthaphan Phunsawat

== B ==
- Banjong Pisanthanakun
- Big Ass
- Billy Ogan
- Bodyslam
- Boriboon Chanrueng
- Boyd Kosiyabong
- Boyscout
- Buakaw Banchamek

== C ==
- Carabao
- Chaiya Mitchai
- Chaleumpol Tikumpornteerawong
- Chanon Santinatornkul
- Chantavit Dhanasevi
- Charlie Trairat
- Chatchai Plengpanich
- Chatchawit Techarukpong
- Chatthapong Pantanaunkul
- Chawarin Perdpiriyawong
- Chawinroj Likitcharoensakul
- Chayatorn Trairattanapradit
- Chinawut Indracusin
- Chittaphon Leechaiyapornkul
- Chonlathorn Kongyingyong
- Chulachak Chakrabongse
- Chupong Changprung
- Chutavuth Pattarakampol
- Clash

== D ==
- Daweerit Chullasapya
- Dharmthai Plangsilp
- Dom Hetrakul

== E ==
- Ekkaphong Jongkesakorn
- Evo Nine

== F ==
- Fame

== G ==
- Gawin Caskey
- Getsunova
- Golf & Mike
- Gunn Junhavat

== H ==
- Harit Cheewagaroon
- Hi-Rock
- Hijack
- Hirunkit Changkham
- Hussawee Pakrapongpisan

== I ==
- Itthipat Thanit
- Itthipol Mameket

== J ==
- Jackrin Kungwankiatichai
- Jakrapatr Kaewpanpong
- James Ma
- Jaruwat Cheawaram
- Jason Young
- Jesdaporn Pholdee
- Jetrin Wattanasin
- Jinjett Wattanasin
- Jinna Navarat
- Jirakit Kuariyakul
- Jirakit Thawornwong
- Jirawat Sutivanichsak
- Jirayu La-Ongmanee
- Jirayu Tangsrisuk
- Jitaraphol Potiwihok
- Joey Chernyim
- Johnny Anfone
- Joni Anwar
- Julien Poupart
- Jumpol Adulkittiporn

== K ==
- K-OTIC
- Kanaphan Puitrakul
- Kanawut Traipipattanapong
- Kawee Tanjararak
- Kay Lertsittichai
- Kiatkamol Lata
- Kongkiat Khomsiri
- Korapat Kirdpan
- Korn Khunatipapisiri
- Kornchid Boonsathitpakdee
- Kornkan Sutthikoses
- Krissada Pornweroj
- Krissanapoom Pibulsonggram
- Krit Amnuaydechkorn
- Krit Sripoomseth
- Kunpimook Bhuwakul

== L ==
- Lapat Ngamchaweng
- Leo Putt
- Leo Saussay
- Lift&Oil
- Louis Hesse
- Louis Scott
- Luke Ishikawa Plowden
- LYKN

== M ==
- Manaswin Nuntasane
- Mario Maurer
- Masu Junyangdikul
- Matthew Deane
- Metawin Opas-iamkajorn
- Michael Shaowanasai
- Mick Tongraya
- Mitr Chaibancha
- Modern Dog

== N ==
- Nadech Kugimiya
- Namo Tongkumnerd
- Napat Injaiuea
- Naphat Siangsomboon
- Naravit Lertratkosum
- Nat Sakdatorn
- Natachai Boonprasert
- Natouch Siripongthon
- Nattawat Finkler
- Nattawat Jirochtikul
- Nattawin Wattanagitiphat
- Nawasch Phupantachsee
- Nawat Phumphotingam
- Nichkhun Horvejkul
- Nine by Nine
- Nirut Sirichanya
- Niti Chaichitathorn
- Noppakao Dechaphatthanakun
- Norawit Titicharoenrak
- Norraphat Vilaiphan

== O ==
- Oabnithi Wiwattanawarang

== P ==
- Pachara Chirathivat
- Pakin Kuna-anuvit
- Pakorn Chatborirak
- Pakorn Lam
- Palitchoke Ayanaputra
- Panitan Budkaew
- Paradox
- Paris Intarakomalyasut
- Pat Chatborirak
- Pathit Pisitkul
- Patiparn Pataweekarn
- Pattadon Janngeon
- Pause
- Pawat Chittsawangdee
- Perawat Sangpotirat
- Petchtai Wongkamlao
- Phai Phongsathon
- Phakin Khamwilaisak
- Phakphum Romsaithong
- Phiravich Attachitsataporn
- Phupoom Pongpanupak
- Phuwin Tangsakyuen
- Pichetpong Chiradatesakunvong
- Pirapat Watthanasetsiri
- Pluem Pongpisal
- Pongpat Wachirabunjong
- Pongsak Pongsuwan
- Pongsak Rattanapong
- Poompat Iam-samang
- Potato
- Poyfai Malaiporn
- Prachaya Ruangroj
- Preecha Chanapai
- Prin Suparat
- Pru
- Pruk Panich
- Purim Rattanaruangwattana
- Putthipong Assaratanakul
- Putthipong Sriwat
- Puttichai Kasetsin

== R ==
- Rangsiroj Panpeng
- Rapeepong Supatineekitdecha
- Rapheephong Thapsuwan
- Rathavit Kijworalak
- Ratthasart Korrasud
- Ray MacDonald
- Ruangsak Loychusak

== S ==
- Sadanont Durongkavarojana
- Sahaphap Wongratch
- Saharat Hiranthanapuwadol
- Saharat Sangkapreecha
- Sakrat Ruekthamrong
- Saksit Vejsupaporn
- Samart Payakaroon
- Santisuk Promsiri
- Saran Sirilak
- Saranyu Winaipanit
- Sarin Ronnakiat
- Sapol Assawamunkong
- Sattawat Sethakorn
- Sattabut Laedeke
- Shahkrit Yamnam
- Silly Fools
- Sivakorn Adulsuttikul
- Siwat Chotchaicharin
- Slot Machine
- So Cool
- Sombat Metanee
- Somchai Kemglad
- Somjit Jongjohor
- Somlek Sakdikul
- Somluck Kamsing
- Songsit Roongnophakunsri
- Sorapong Chatree
- Sornram Teppitak
- Sukollawat Kanarot
- Sukosol Clapp
- Sukrit Wisetkaew
- Sunny Suwanmethanon
- Supakorn Kitsuwon
- Supanat Chalermchaichareonkij
- Supawatt Aumprasit
- Suphakorn Sriphothong
- Suppasit Jongcheveevat
- Suppapong Udomkaewkanjana
- Supha Sangaworawong
- Suradet Piniwat
- Suwinit Panjamawat

== T ==
- Tachaya Prathumwan
- Talay Sanguandikul
- Tanapon Sukhumpantanasan
- Tatchakorn Yeerum
- Thana Chatborirak
- Thanapat Kawila
- Thanat Danjesda
- Thanat Lowkhunsombat
- Thanatsaran Samthonglai
- Thanavat Vatthanaputi
- Thanawat Rattanakitpaisan
- Thanakrit Panichwid
- Thanapob Leeratanakachorn
- Thanayong Wongtrakul
- Thanwa Suriyajak
- The Toys
- Theeradej Wongpuapan
- Thiti Mahayotaruk
- Thitisan Goodburn
- Thitiwat Ritprasert
- Thitipoom Techaapaikhun
- Thongchai McIntyre
- Toon Hiranyasap
- Touch Na Takuatung
- Trai Nimtawat
- Tanin Manoonsilp
- Tanit Jitnukul
- Tanont Chumroen
- Tanutchai Wijitwongthong
- Tara Tipa
- Tawan Vihokratana
- Tawinan Anukoolprasert
- Teeradon Supapunpinyo
- Teeradetch Metawarayut
- Teerapat Sajakul
- Teetatch Ratanasritai
- Thakrit Tawanpong
- Theerachai Wimolchaireuk
- Thep Po-ngam

== U ==
- Unnop Thongborisut
- Utt Panichkul

== V ==
- Vachiravit Paisarnkulwong
- Vachirawit Chivaaree
- Vasu Sangsingkeo
- Vichayut Limratanamongkol
- Visava Thaiyanont
- Vithaya Pansringarm
- Vonthongchai Intarawat

== W ==
- Wachirawit Ruangwiwat
- Wan Thanakrit
- Waraphat Phatsathit
- Warintorn Panhakarn
- Way-Ar Sangngern
- Weerayut Chansook
- Willy McIntosh
- Winai Kraibutr
- Witsarut Himmarat
- Witwisit Hiranyawongkul
- Wongravee Nateetorn
- Worrawech Danuwong

== Y ==
- Yingyong Yodbuangarm
- Yongsin Wongpanitnont
- Yuke Songpaisan
