= Nadao Bangkok =

Thai media company

Nadao Bangkok Co., Ltd.
- Native name: บริษัท นาดาว บางกอก จำกัด
- Type: Private
- Industry: Television production; Talent management
- Founded: September 9, 2009; 17 years ago in Bangkok, Thailand
- Founder: Songyos Sugmakanan
- Fate: Renamed to Tada Entertainment on September 29, 2022
- Headquarters: 92/14 Soi Sukhumvit Road 31, Khlong Tan Nuea, Watthana District, Bangkok, Thailand
- Key people: Songyos Sugmakanan (CEO); Kriangkrai Vachiratamporn
- Owners: Songyos Sugmakanan (32%); GDH 559 (30%); Hub Ho Hin Bangkok (10%); Others (28%); (As of 2021)

Nadao Bangkok Co., Ltd. (Thai: นาดาวบางกอก) was a Thai media company in operation from 2009 to 2022. It did business in artist management and television and music production. The company was headed by Songyos Sugmakanan, its largest shareholder and CEO, and was a partially owned subsidiary of the film studio GDH 559 (itself a subsidiary of entertainment conglomerate GMM Grammy).

The company was established under GDH's predecessor GTH, and initially focused only on talent management for GTH's actors. It branched into television production with the 2013 hit TV series Hormones, and since then produced television and streaming drama series including Project S, In Family We Trust, My Ambulance and I Told Sunset About You. A music production arm, Nadao Music, was launched in 2019 as a creative venue for artists under the company's umbrella, who numbered 39 in 2020, mostly young actors catering to Nadao and GDH's target audience group of 15–30-year-olds. However, Nadao ended its artist management as well as series and music production operations in 2022, citing its artists' growth and diverging priorities among its staff. The company was renamed Tada Entertainment and relaunched as a new venture focusing on managing idol groups in the music industry.

== History ==
Nadao Bangkok Co., Ltd. was registered on September 9, 2009. The company was founded as a partially owned subsidiary of film studio GMM Tai Hub (GTH) to manage its growing roster of actors and help develop their talents. It was headed by Songyos Sugmakanan, who had directed several films with GTH.

During its first few years, the company focused on casting and artist management, but struggled to generate revenue. In 2012, Songyos conceived the teen drama television series Hormones to create acting opportunities for the company's teenage actors. The series, released in 2013, became widely popular, prompting the company to produce two subsequent seasons. Hormones' success became a turning point for Nadao, giving it a renewed focus on content production for television as well as the streaming service Line TV, for whose 2015 launch Nadao produced the miniseries Stay.

As GTH was dissolved at the end of 2015 due to internal disagreements, its holdings in Nadao Bangkok were transferred to its successor GDH 559. Nadao further expanded as it partnered with concert organizer 4nologue to launch the boy group Nine by Nine in 2018, releasing its first mainstream prime-time series In Family We Trust as part of the project. By 2020, when it released I Told Sunset About You, its staff had grown to fifty, up from eight during the creation of Hormones. It had 39 actors signed under its label at the beginning of that year. Most were young actors, catering to Nadao and GDH's target audience group of 15–30-year-olds.

The company launched an in-house record label, Nadao Music, as a business unit in 2019. Aimed at opening up opportunities in music to its artists, its first release, "Rak Tid Siren" (รักติดไซเรน, "My Ambulance"), the soundtrack to its 2019 series My Ambulance, became one of the most popular songs of the year. Singer Supol Phuasirirak was brought on as the unit's director and main producer. The company also launched a talent development unit, titled Nadao Academy, to recruit new members, in 2020.

In 2022, the company ended its artist management as well as series and music production operations, effective June 1, citing its artists' growth and diverging priorities among its staff. GDH CEO Jina Osothsilp explained in an interview that the decision was made over the preceding two years, as Songyos felt he had run out of passion to continue with the current operation, and many opportunities were now available to its artists, the world having changed so that it was now much easier to self-manage as individuals compared to before.

The company registration for Nadao Bangkok had its name changed to Tada Entertainment Co., Ltd. on September 29, 2022. The business's relaunch as Tada Entertainment was announced by Songyos in February 2023. It is now focused on idol artist management, with subsidiary labels Ily Lab and Sonray Music covering female and male idol groups, respectively.

== Operations ==
Nadao Bangkok has an authorized capital of 2 million baht (US$60,000 in 2009), and is headquartered at 92/14 Soi Sukhumvit 31, Khlong Tan Nuea Subdistrict, Watthana District, Bangkok. Songyos is the company's largest shareholder and serves as its CEO.

Before it ceased activity in 2022, Nadao Bangkok was 32% owned by Songyos, 30% by GDH, 10% by Hub Ho Hin Bangkok (GDH's minority owner), and 28% by others. Its board of directors included Boosaba Daorueng (CEO of GDH's majority owner GMM Grammy), GDH CEO Jina, Songyos, Rojjarek Luerojwong, and Jongjit Inthung (Nadao's senior artist manager). With the cessation of operations, GDH offloaded its stake in the company to Songyos at a price of 6,948,780 baht.

Nadao did business in three main areas: artist management, production, and music. From 2016 to 2019, it reported increasing revenues from 166 million baht ($5M) to 392 million ($12M) and profits from 17 million baht ($500,000) to 40 million ($1.2M), which dropped to 313 million ($10M) and 29 million ($900,000) in 2020, when the COVID-19 pandemic hit. Its artist management business generated 60–70 percent of its revenue, and the rest was from production. (The music unit had not become profitable as of October 2020.) However, its production business yielded higher profit margins of 20–30 percent, while artist management yielded 8–15 percent.

With Songyos and his team's background in film, Nadao regularly employed filmmaking techniques in its creative process rather than those typical of traditional television productions. This resulted in higher costs (production of Nadao series cost about 2.5 million baht per episode, compared to 1.4–1.5 million for most mainstream prime-time series) which limited the company's capacity, though Songyos insisted on maintaining quality as a distinctive feature of their output.

== Former actors ==
Senior

- Pattarasaya Kreursuwansiri (Peak)
- Ratchu Surajaras (Vaan)
- Sunny Suwanmethanont (Sunny)
- Chantavit Dhanasevi (Ter)
- Suvikrom Amaranon (Per)

First Gen

- Pachara Chirathivat (Peach)
- Ungsumalynn Sirapatsakmetha (Pattie)
- Supassara Thanachat (Kao)
- Sutatta Udomsilp (PunPun)
- Chutavuth Pattarakampol (March)
- Sirachuch Chienthaworn (Michael)
- Sananthachat Thanapatpisal (Fon)
- Awat Ratanapintha (Ud)
- Gunn Junhavat (Gunn)
- Napat Chokejindachai (Top)
- Thanapob Leeratanakachorn (Tor)
- Kemisara Paladesh (Belle)
- Oabnithi Wiwattanawarang (Oab)
- Sedthawut Anusit (Tou)
- Tonhon Tantivejakul (Ton)

Next Gen

- Chanon Santinatornkul (Non)
- Teeradon Supapunpinyo (James)
- Nutchapan Paramacharenroj (Pepo)
- Teetatch Ratanasritai (Kaopun)
- Pakamas Kanchanaburangkun (Kade)
- Saruda Kiatwarawut (Babymild)
- Kunut Boonard (Ken)
- Pavadee Komchokpaisan (Cook)
- Atitaya Craig (Claudine)
- Nichaphat Chatchaipholrat (Pearwah)
- Chayanit Chansangavej (Pat)
- Krissanapoom Pibulsonggram (JJ)
- Kanyawee Songmuang (Thanaerng)
- Thiti Mahayotaruk (Bank)
- Wongravee Nateetorn (Sky)
- Narikun Ketprapakorn (Frung)
- Sarit Trilertvichien (Pea)
- Kanish Vichienvanitchakul (Omp)
- Narupornkamol Chaisang (Praew)
- Dan Pruekpayoong (JJ)
- Jirayus Khaobaimai (Rolex)

New Gen

- Jesadawat Suwanvanichakij (Jade)
- Chonlathorn Kongyingyong (Captain)
- Paris Intarakomalyasut (Ice)
- Ponlawit Ketprapakorn (Pond)
- Putthipong Assaratanakul (Billkin)
- Krit Amnuaydechkorn (PP)
- Panachai Sriariyarungruang (Junior)
- Kandis Wanaroon (Mai-Ake)
- Ingkarat Damrongsakkul (Ryu)
- Sawanya Paisarnpayak (Nana)
- Pongpol Panyamit (Khunpol)

== Works ==
=== Television series ===
Year	Title	Cast	Director(s)	Original broadcast date	Original network	Production company
2013	Hormones: The Series	See list	Songyos Sugmakanan	May 18 – August 17, 2013	One31	GTH
2014	Hormones: The Series Season 2	See list	Kriangkrai Vachiratamporn	July 12 – October 18, 2014	GMM 25; GTH On Air	GTH; Jor Kwang Films
2015	Stay: Saga...Love Always	Sunny Suwanmethanont; Supassara Thanachat; Thiti Mahayotaruk; Teeradon Supapunpinyo	Songyos Sugmakanan	February 21 – March 14, 2015	Line TV	GTH
2015	Hormones 3: The Final Season	See list	Kriangkrai Vachiratamporn	September 19 – December 19, 2015	One31; GTH On Air	GTH; Jor Kwang Films
2016	Yoo Tee Rao	Phakin Khamwilaisak; Oabnithi Wiwattanawarang; Chayanit Chansangavej	Songyos Sugmakanan	March 26 – April 30, 2016	Line TV	Thai Yamaha Motors
2016	I Hate You, I Love You	Suttata Udomsilp; Sananthachat Thanapatpisal; Oabnithi Wiwattanawarang; Krissanapoom Pibulsonggram; Wongravee Nateetorn	Songyos Sugmakanan	September 24, 2016 – January 14, 2017	Line TV	Line Thailand
2017	Project S: Spike!	Oabnithi Wiwattanawarang; Thiti Mahayotaruk	Pitchaya Jarusboonpracha	May 20, 2017 – January 27, 2018	GMM 25	GDH 559; Jor Kwang Films; Hub Ho Hin Bangkok
2017	Project S: Side by Side	Thanapob Leeratanakajorn; Wongravee Nateetorn	Naruebet Kuno	May 20, 2017 – January 27, 2018	GMM 25	GDH 559; Jor Kwang Films; Hub Ho Hin Bangkok
2017	Project S: S.O.S	Teeradon Supapunpinyo; Toni Rakkaen	Pat Boonnitipat	May 20, 2017 – January 27, 2018	GMM 25	GDH 559; Jor Kwang Films; Hub Ho Hin Bangkok
2017	Project S: Shoot! I Love You	Narikun Ketprapakorn; Krissanapoom Pibulsonggram	Tanida Hantaweewatana	May 20, 2017 – January 27, 2018	GMM 25	GDH 559; Jor Kwang Films; Hub Ho Hin Bangkok
2018	In Family We Trust	See list	Songyos Sugmakanan	September 14 – November 10, 2018	One31	The One Enterprise; 4nologue
2019	Great Men Academy	See list	Wanweaw Hongvivat; Weawawan Hongvivat	February 6 – March 27, 2019	Line TV	LINE Thailand
2019	My Ambulance	Sunny Suwanmethanont; Davika Hoorne; Wongravee Nateetorn	Naruebet Kuno	September 6 – October 26, 2019	One31	The One Enterprise
2020	I Told Sunset About You	Putthipong Assaratanakul; Krit Amnuaydechkorn	Naruebet Kuno	October 22 – November 19, 2020	Line TV	Line Thailand
2021	Blackout	Chonlathorn Kongyingyong; Narupornkamol Chaisang; Oabnithi Wiwattanawarang; Violette Wautier	Kriangkrai Vachiratamporn; Atis Kitsupapaisan	February 1 – March 3, 2021	AIS Play	Nadao Bangkok; AIS Play
2021	I Promised You the Moon	Putthipong Assaratanakul; Krit Amnuaydechkorn	Tossaphon Riantong	May 27 – June 24, 2021	Line TV	Line Thailand

=== Film ===
Year	Title	Cast	Director(s)	Release date	Production company
2011	The Billionaire	Pachara Chirathivat	Songyos Sugmakanan	October 20, 2011	GTH

=== Short films ===
Year	Title	Cast	Director(s)	Production company
2011	Confident That More Than a Million Thais Hate Methawi	Jarinporn Joonkiat	Nawapol Thamrongrattanarit	Mind Artworks
2016	Sanctuary	BamBam; Thanapob Leeratanakajorn; Thiti Mahayotaruk; Teeradon Supapunpinyo; Park Jin-young; Mark Tuan	Songyos Sugmakanan	4NOLOGUE

=== Nadao Music ===
Year	Title	Artist(s)	Release date
2019	Rak Tit Siren (My Ambulance)	Ice Paris & PEARWAH	August 14, 2019
2019	Love Message	Sunny Suwanmethanont & Sky Wongravee	September 8, 2019
2019	Tok Lum Rak (Heartbeat)	Mai Davika	October 2, 2019
2019	Mai Penrai Rok (It's O.K.)	Thanaerng Kanyawee	October 5, 2019
2019	You Are My Everything	Billkin	October 12, 2019
2019	Rak Tit Siren (My Ambulance) (Midnight Version)	Ice Paris	October 18, 2019
2020	Didi (UNEXPECTED)	JAYLERR & Ice Paris	February 7, 2020
2020	Hom Thoe (Scent of Love)	Ice Paris feat. Jarinporn Joonkiat	March 5, 2020
2020	Kot Nai Chai (Hug in the Heart)	Billkin feat. JAYLERR	April 23, 2020
2020	Loh-maa Mai Chai Bplaa (A Dolphin isn't a Fish)	NaNa	July 15, 2020
2020	คุยไปก่อน (Take Your Time)	CAPTAIN	August 13, 2020
2020	Very Very Sorry	JAYLERR	September 9, 2020
2020	กีดกัน (Skyline) - I Told Sunset About You OST	Billkin	September 30, 2020
2020	เจอกันก็พัง ห่างกันก็ร้าย	PEARWAH	October 27, 2020
2020	แปลไม่ออก (Can't Translate) - I Told Sunset About You OST	Billkin	October 29, 2020
2020	หรูเหอ 如何 (Skyline) - I Told Sunset About You OST	PP	November 5, 2020
2020	ระเบียง (Balcony)	JAYLERR	November 10, 2020
2020	โคตรพิเศษ (Freaking Special) - I Told Sunset About You OST	Billkin	November 19, 2020
2020	โคตรพิเศษ (Freaking Special) - I Told Sunset About You OST	PP	November 19, 2020
2020	ใจมันรู้สึก (NUDE)	JAYLERR X Ice Paris	December 9, 2020
2021	มันดีเลย (It's So Good)	เป๊ก ผลิตโชค X PEARWAH X Billkin X PP	January 16, 2021
2021	นาทีนี้ (Let's Love)	Ice Paris	March 11, 2021
2021	รู้งี้เป็นแฟนกันตั้งนานแล้ว (Safe Zone)	Billkin X PP	April 29, 2021
2021	อยากเริ่มต้นใหม่กับคนเดิม	JAYLERR X Ice Paris	May 25, 2021
2021	ห่มผ้า (Hold Me Tight) - I Told Sunset About You Part 2 OST	PP	May 28, 2021
2021	ร (W8)	JAYLERR X Ice Paris	June 1, 2021
2021	คนไกล	JAYLERR X Ice Paris	June 8, 2021
2021	หลอกกันทั้งนั้น (Fake News) - I Told Sunset About You Part 2 OST	PP	June 15, 2021
2021	ฝืน	JAYLERR X Ice Paris	June 15, 2021
2021	หลอกกันทั้งนั้น (Fake News) - I Told Sunset About You Part 2 OST	Billkin	June 18, 2021
2021	ทะเลสีดำ (Black Sea) - I Told Sunset About You Part 2 OST	Billkin X PP	June 20, 2021
2021	ไม่ปล่อยมือ (Coming of Age) - I Told Sunset About You Part 2 OST	Billkin X PP	June 25, 2021
2021	เมื่อวานก็นานไป (Feels Like a Year)	JAYLERR X Ice Paris	July 15, 2021
2021	It's Okay Not To Be Alright	PP	August 13, 2021
2021	I ไม่ O (IXO)	Billkin	September 9, 2021
2021	เก็บไว้ตลอดไป (Once & Forever)	Billkin	October 7, 2021
2021	รอยยิ้มไกลไกล (Smile In The Sky)	Ice Paris	November 11, 2021
2022	I'll Do It How You Like It	PP	February 3, 2022
2022	แลกเลยปะ (Hoo Whee Hoo)	Billkin x PP x 4EVE	April 21, 2022
2022	พิเศษจะตาย (One Of A Kind)	Ice Paris	May 5, 2022
2022	ร้อยเปอร์เซ็นต์ (100%)	TAEW x PP	May 27, 2022

=== Television programs ===
Year	Title	Broadcast date	Broadcast time & Channel
2011	Hang Over Thailand	February 12 – March 17, 2011	every Thursday at 8:00 am on YouTube channel of Travel Channel Thailand
2015	Frozen Hormones	June 21 – September 13, 2015	every Sunday at 10:30 am on One 31
2015	Hang Over Thailand	September 20 – October 11, 2015	every Sunday at 10:00 am on One31 / 12:00 pm on LINE TV
2016	Hang Over Thailand	April 24 – December 25, 2016	every Sunday at 11:00 am on GMM 25 / 13:00 pm on LINE TV
2017–2018	Game of Teens	February 5, 2017 – February 18, 2018	every Sunday at 11:00 am on GMM 25 / 13:00 pm on LINE TV
2021	Hang Over Thailand	January 9 – February 6, 2021	every Saturday at 10:30 am on YouTube channel of Nadao Bangkok
