= Stay (miniseries) =

- Promotional poster
- Also known as: STAY: Saga..I will miss you
- Genre: Comedy; Romance; Youth
- Created by: GTH
- Developed by: Nadao Bangkok
- Written by: Songyos Sugmakanan
- Directed by: Songyos Sugmakanan
- Starring: See below
- Country of origin: Thailand
- Original languages: Thai; Japanese
- No. of seasons: 1
- No. of episodes: 4

Production
- Producer: Songyos Sugmakanan
- Production locations: Saga Prefecture, Japan
- Running time: 60 minutes

Original release
- Network: LINE TV; GMM 25; GTH On Air (Re-run on TV)
- Release: 21 February – 14 March 2015

Stay: Saga...Love Always (known in Thai as "Stay ซากะ..ฉันจะคิดถึงเธอ") is a Thai miniseries produced by GTH and Nadao Bangkok as a special project for the Line TV application, sponsored by LINE Corporation (Thailand) Co., Ltd. The series was written and directed by Songyos Sugmakanan and filmed in Japan's Saga Prefecture with support of the Saga Prefectural Government and the Saga Prefecture Film Commission. It is a love story of two Thai people living in Saga, a small province with hidden warmth. The series was aired on Saturdays at 20:00 on the Line TV application from 21 February to 14 March 2015, for 4 episodes. It was re-run on satellite/cable television on GMM 25 and GTH On Air beginning 27 June 2015.

== Production ==
Stay was one of the special projects that GTH produced for Line Corporation (Thailand) to use as exclusive content in advertising and promoting the launch of the Line TV application. Filming was supported by the Saga Prefecture Film Commission as part of the prefecture's strategy of promoting its tourism through foreign cinema. Filming began at the beginning of 2015, with more than 30 crew members filming and staying in Japan for more than a month.

== Synopsis ==
Jook is a girl who has always dreamed of publishing her own book. She decides to combine her dream and her studies by thinking about working on a final project - a journal about food in Japan, with her best friend Ann. A journey to complete her dream then begins and her destination is a small farm in rural Saga, Japan. But in the end, Jook unexpectedly has to go to Japan by herself because suddenly, her best friend decides to ditch her.

At the farm, Jook meets Mee, a kind-hearted Thai man who has left his homeland to spend his life and work in Japan for 3 years. Mee is like Jook's babysitter who takes care of her, which quickly makes them grow closer. But little do they know, their feelings for each other also start growing.

== Cast ==
=== Main ===
- Sunny Suwanmethanont as Mee / Kuma (bear)
- Supassara Thanachart as Jook
- Thiti Mahayotaruk as Men, Mee's younger brother
- Teeradon Supapunpinyo as Jeng, Jook's younger brother

=== Supporting ===
- Sakura Enokida as Naomi, homestay owner's daughter, Mee's fiancée
- Shinichiro Uchida as Hattori, homestay owner
- Atitaya Craig as Kate
- Thanabordee Jaiyen as Copter, Jook's boyfriend
- Arachaporn Pokinpakorn as Ann, Jook's best friend

== Release ==
Stay was revealed at the launch announcement of the Line TV application on 6 February 2015. The series' four episodes were originally aired on Saturdays at 20:00 on the Line TV application from 21 February to 14 March 2015. It was re-run on satellite/cable television on GMM 25 and GTH On Air beginning 27 June 2015.

The series, together with other Thai productions, helped fuel a rise in Thai tourism for the Saga Prefecture, which recorded 4,600 visitors in 2015, compared to 380 in 2012.

== Songs ==
Title	Artist	Music video release date
Secret Admiring (แอบชอบ)	La-Ong-Fong	February 7, 2015
STAY	Getsunova	March 16, 2015
