= Sananthachat Thanapatpisal =

Thai actress (born 1994)

- ศนันธฉัตร ธนพัฒน์พิศาล
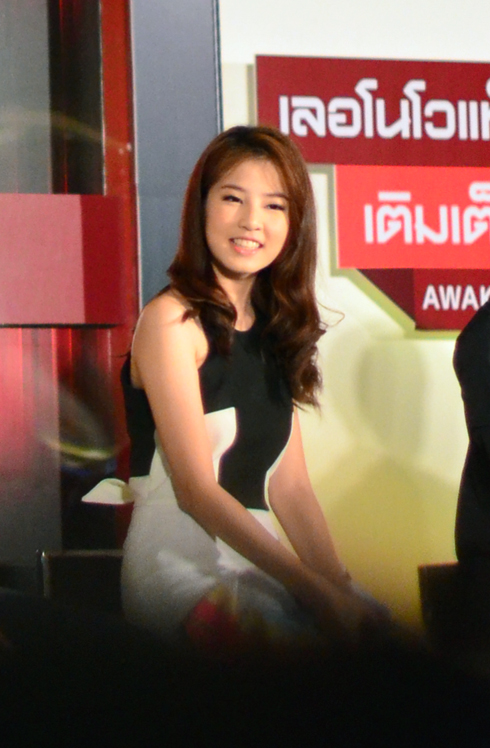
- Sananthachat in 2013
- Born: Chamaiphon Thirasak Thai: ชไมพร ธีระศักดิ์ June 20, 1994 (age 32); Bangkok, Thailand
- Other names: Fon; Sanan
- Education: English Department Faculty of Liberal Arts Mahidol University
- Occupations: Actress; TV host; YouTuber
- Years active: 2012–present
- Known for: Dao in Hormones: The Series
- Height: 1.57 m (5 ft 2 in)

Sananthachat Thanapatpisal ((Thai: ศนันธฉัตร ธนพัฒน์พิศาล); born 20 June 1994), formerly Chamaiphon Thirasak (Thai: ชไมพร ธีระศักดิ์), nicknamed Fon (Thai: ฝน), is a Thai actress. She is known for her role as Dao in Hormones: The Series and Smile in Boy For Rent (2019).

== Personal life ==
In August 2016, Fon Sananthachat graduated from the Faculty of Liberal Arts of Mahidol University with a Bachelor of Arts in English degree.

In February 2017, she launched her brand "FOND", which primarily markets ladies footwear.

== Career ==
Fon Sananthachat debuted in the entertainment industry in 2012 where she took part in the drama Muad Ohpas 2 and See Sahai Sabai Dee. She also played cameo roles in two movies ATM: Er Rak Error and Seven Something respectively. In 2013, she was cast in the mega hit drama Hormones: The Series where she was given the role of Dao, one of the lead characters in the series.

In 2014, Fon was cast in the school-horror drama, ThirTEEN Terrors along with some of the Hormones Series ensemble, in which she played as "Vee" for the first episode entitled "Wanida". She also reprised her role as Dao for the second installment of Hormones: The Series where she developed a love line with co-actress Belle Kemisara Paladesh depicting the homosexuality and same-sex relationship issues among teenagers.

In 2015, she played for the third and final installment of the Hormones franchise. The characters of Fon and Belle were the only ones maintained from the original cast to depict the "graduation" of the previous characters from the series set and to give way to a new set of characters who will take new lead roles (some of which were introduced in Season 2 and 3 respectively). The original casts made their cameos towards the last episode of the final season. In the same year, she portrayed the character of Pear for Torfun Kub Mawin.

In 2016, Fon, together with Hormones co-actress Suttata Udomsilp, starred in a 20-episode drama Hate Love Series (I Hate You, I Love You) which aired on LINE TV from September 24, 2016 and recently concluded last January 14, 2017. In the same year, Fon was paired with actor Phumphothingam Nawat for in U-Prince: The Playful Comm-Arts which aired from December 4, 2016 to December 25, 2016 on GMM One.

In 2017, she starred in the drama Water Boyy, the TV-adaptation of the 2015 LGBT-themed movie "Waterboyy", with actors Thitipoom Techaapaikhun and Victor Zheng among others. The drama will air every Sunday starting April 9 on GMMTV. In the same year, Fon was cast in one of the four different places and stories part of Bangkok Rak Stories which her part is Please. She became the main role in this series along with Baitoei Zuvapit, Meiko Chonnikan Netjui, Tou Sedthawut Anusit, Kacha Nontanun and Chatchawit Techarukpong. She was paired with Tou Sedthawut Anusit which he also one of the original actor in Hormones The Series.

== Hormones: The Series and popularity ==
Fon gained much popularity following the success of the mega hit series Hormones with her character Dao, marking her career breakthrough and rise to stardom as an actress. Many fans were impressed by the transition of her character who started off as the young, sheltered and naive girl, and gradually developed into a more aggressive and more vocal character towards the second season of the series. In Hormones 3, her character depicted great maturity in terms of attitude and mindset as compared from the first two seasons. The character continued to attract more attention when the relationship with her best friend Koi (played by Belle Kemisara) was taken into a new level. With well-written storylines and impressive acting, Fon and Belle have become one of the most popular couples from the series.

== Filmography ==
=== Television dramas ===
- 2015 Torfun Kub Mawin 2015 (ทอฝันกับมาวิน) (Exact-Scenario/One 31) as Lookpear (Pear) (ลูกแพร์ (แพร์)) with Chatchawit Techarukpong
- 2018 In Family We Trust (เลือดข้นคนจาง) (The One Enterprise-Nadao Bangkok-4nologue/One 31) as Sanan () (ศนัน (รับเชิญ))
- 2020 Fai Sin Chua (2020) (ไฟสิ้นเชื้อ) (Goodboy Entertainment/GMM 25) as Narin (ครูณริน) with Way-Ar Sangngern
- 2020 Duang Baeb Nee Mai Mee Ju (ดวงแบบนี้ไม่มีจู๋) (Master One VDO Production/Ch.3) as Phoonlab (Grace) (พูนลาภ รวยเก่งเฮงเจริญ (เกรท))
- 2022 Bad Romeo (คือเธอ) (Thong Entertainment/Ch.3) as Primprao (Prim) (พริ้มเพรา (พริ้ม))
- 2022 (มณีมรณะ) (The One Enterprise/One 31) as ()

=== Television series ===
- 2012 Muad Opas 2 (หมวดโอภาส เดอะซีรีส์ ปี 2) (GMM Tai Hub/Ch.9) as Pui (ปุ้ย)
- 2013-2015 Hormones: The Series (ฮอร์โมนส์ วัยว้าวุ่น) (GMM Tai Hub, Nadao Bangkok/One 31) as Dao (Dujdao Jamraspaisarn) (ดุจดาว จำรัสไพศาล (ดาว))
- 2013 GTH Side Stories (จีทีเอช ไซด์ สตอรี่ส์ ตอน รถไฟฟ้า..มหานะเพลิน) (GMM Tai Hub/GTH On Air) as Kob (ก็อบ (เพื่อนของเพลิน))
- 2013 ATM 2: Koo ver Error Er Rak (ATM 2 คู่เว่อ เอ่อเร่อ เอ่อรัก) (GMM Tai Hub/GTH On Air) as Kob (ก็อบ)
- 2013 Carabao The Series (คาราบาว เดอะซีรี่ส์ ตอน หนุ่มสุพรรณ) (Workpoint Entertainment/Ch.9) as Kampoo (ก้ามปู) with Pattadon Janngeon
- 2014 Thirteen Terrors (เพื่อนเฮี้ยน..โรงเรียนหลอน ตอน วนิดา) (Workpoint Entertainment/GMM 25) as Vee (Manutsavee) (มนัสวี วงศ์ทองปาน)
- 2015 Frozen Hormones - Special () (Nadao Bangkok/One 31) as Herself
- 2016 Club Friday To Be Continued (Club Friday To Be Continued ตอน สัญญาใจ) (เก้ง กวาง แก๊งค์/GMM 25) as Mim (มิ้ม)
- 2016 (Love Songs Love Series ตอน ฤดูร้อน) (GMM 25/GMM 25) as Best (เบส) with Pathompong Reonchaidee
- 2016 I Hate You, I Love You (I Hate You, I Love You ตอน ) (Nadao Bangkok/LINE TV, GMM 25) as Sol (ซอล) with Oabnithi Wiwattanawarang
- 2017 U-Prince: The Playful Comm-Arts (GMMTV/GMM 25) as Sung (ซัง) with Nawat Phumphotingam
- 2017 Water Boyy (Water Boyy the Series) (GMM Grammy-GMMTV/GMM 25) as Wan (ว่าน) with Chatchawit Techarukpong
- 2017 Bangkok Love Stories: PLEASE (Bangkok รัก Stories ตอน Please) (GMM Bravo/GMM 25) as Ada (เอด้า) with Sedthawut Anusit
- 2017 Club Friday Celeb's Stories (Club Friday Celeb's Stories ตอน แย่งชิง) ([[:th:

เอไทม์ มีเดีย|A Time Media]]/GMM 25) as Bowie (โบวี่)

- 2018 Mueng Maya Live The Series Part 3: Sai Luerd Maya (เมืองมายา Live ตอน สายเลือดมายา) (The One Enterprise/One 31) as Sirapatsorn Darasak (Noeywan) (ศิรภัสสร ดาราศักดิ์ (เนยหวาน)) with Worrawech Danuwong & Isariy Patharamanop & Kitsakorn Kanoktorn
- 2018 Kiss Me Again (Kiss Me Again จูบให้ได้ถ้านายแน่จริง) (GMM Grammy-GMMTV/GMM 25) as Sanwhan (แสนหวาน) with Chutavuth Pattarakampol
- 2019 Boy For Rent (Boy for Rent ผู้ชายให้เช่า) (GMMTV/One 31) as Smile (สไมล์) with Tanutchai Wijitwongthong
- 2020 (กักตัว สตอรี่ ตอน The Coach จูนความคิด ปิดความทุกข์) (Nadao Bangkok/YouTube) as (โหยว)

=== Television sitcoms ===
- 2012 See Sahai Sabai Dee (สี่สหายสบายดี) (559 On Air/Ch.7) as Ying (หญิง)
- 2013 Office Pichit Jai (ออฟฟิศ พิชิตใจ) (Workpoint Entertainment/Ch.9) as Ming (มิ้ง)
- 2013 Ra Berd Therd Theng (ระเบิดเที่ยงแถวตรง ตอน คุณหนูฮาร์ดร็อค) (Workpoint Entertainment/Ch.5) as Pat (แพท)
- 2018 (เสือ ชะนี เก้ง ตอน เฮียออยฮะ) (The One Enterprise/One 31) as Pinkky () (พิ้งกี้ ())

=== Film ===
Year	Title	Role
2012	ATM: Er Rak Error	Gob
2012	Seven Something	Cameo
2018	Bike Man	Jai

=== Specials ===
Year	Title	Role
2016	Love Song Love Stories	-

=== Music video appearances ===
Song title	Thai text	Singer
Hindrance	"หน่วง"	Room 39
A Million Words Of Love	“รักล้านคำ	Alarm9
I'll Be The Real One	"ฉันคือตัวจริง"	Funktion
I Can't Hug You	"กอดไม่ได้"	Bedroom Audio
Not In Your Eyes	"ไม่อยู่ในสายตา"	Dunk Punkorn
Hot Shower	"อาบน้ำร้อน"	Big Ass
Reverse	"ย้อน"	Slot Machine
No Status	"จริงจังสักครั้ง"	Ging Muanpair

=== Hosting ===
==== Television ====
- 2013 : Play Gang Boys Meet Girls on Air Play Channel
- 2013 : นิทานมาแล้ว on Air Channel 9
- 2015 : รอบรั้วสถาบัน by สำนักข่าว S.U.N. (School & University Network) on Air GMM 25

==== Online ====
- 2020 : On Air YouTube: Sananthachat (2018–present)
- 2019 : ติดฝน on Air YouTube: Sananthachat (2019–present)
