= Tutchapon Suaetongkum =

Thai actor

- Born: Tossapon Suaetongkum; December 19, 1995; Bangkok, Thailand
- Other names: Soh
- Occupation: Actor
- Height: 5.7 ft (174 cm)

Tutchapon Suaetongkum (Thai: โซ่ ธัชพล เสือทองคำ) as known as Soh Tutchapon, Soh Strawberry Krubcake (former name: Tossapon Suaetongkum) is an actor who has been very well known among teenage viewers and he is becoming one of channel's regulars in 2017. Soh was born on December 19, 1995, and is the youngest child in the family following his only one brother 'Save Sirapop'.

Soh started his TV Star career by being invited to join a teen TV show name "Strawberry Krubcake", Thailand's most famous TV-show franchise for teenage viewers on Channel 3 together with other 8 members: Auey (who left the group after episode 31 of the show for her education purpose), Enjoy, Emi, Tarn, Plustor, Nick, Bright, and Mira who was the replacement of Auey. Furthermore, Soh was one of few members who appeared on every episodes of the show.

Beside his sport enthusiasm, Soh spends most of his free time in travelling and cooking (especially). Developed from interest, cooking has become one of his marvelous skills. This inspired the show producers to grant him his own special and isolated part called "Mai Hew Jing Ror" (means "Hungry! Aren't you?") in the show.

Soh doesn't use many tools on social media to connect with people. It's the reason why he doesn't appear to be posting updates and photos through Facebook and Twitter. However, he uses Instagram, which is the most common channel he picked to connect with his friends and fan club.

To follow his Instagram, search for tutchaponn

== Education ==
Soh Tutchapon graduated from a famous high school, Suankularb Wittayalai School in Bangkok. And in the same year (2014), he started his bachelor's degree in College of Communication Arts, Rangsit University majoring in Motion Picture and Video

== Works ==
=== Emcee ===
- Strawberry Krubcake (TV Show) Ep. 1 – Ep. 101 Aired for the first time on October 13, 2013 until the last episode which was aired on September 27, 2015. (1 year and 11 months)

=== Film ===
- Tang Yaek Wat Jai (ทางแยกวัดใจ)(2011) a GTH's production. Soh shortly appeared during one the scene with the main actress while they were having extra class.

=== TV Dramas ===
- The Beginning Ep. 7–8 (Episode name: B Day D Day) (2014) as Soh (Himself), main actor. The series was a part of the Strawberry Krubcake franchise production. Sincere but persevering Soh (in the series) whose profession is swimming, is keen on making a birthday cake for his crush, Fai. But when Soh asks for some guidance from Tarn, who has always been his close girl friend since when they were young, on how to make an impressive cake, Tarn gives him sincere advises. And that's become the closest time they have ever spent together. The genuine feelings of two close friends are revealed.
- He Ha (Mia) Navy (Thai: เฮฮา (เมีย) นาวี) (2017) (Starring guest) – Produced by DuangMali ManiJan Co., Ltd., this romantic-comedy TV Drama is appointed to air on Channel 3. Leading by Takrit Hemarnopjit and Nantanatch Lohsuwan. Furthermore, after the Strawberry Krubcake franchise has been discontinued, this was the first work that all male members of the franchise reunited: Nick, Bright, Plustor and Soh.
- Tee Nee Mee Rak (Thai: ที่หนี้มีรัก) (2017) (Supporting role) – Another romantic-comedy TV Drama, a Pau Jin Jong Production. Soh plays as a friend of leading actor which means he appears more often and his role is importantly related to the core storyline.
- Yuah Pa Ya Baat (Thai: เหยื่อพยาบาท) (2017) (Leading actor) – The first TV Drama that Soh is featured as a Leading Actor. Under the direction of Thailand's top producer Warayut Milinthachinda (Kai), Soh portrayed an older brother of Fifa Premanan who portrayed his younger brother (Another leading actor). The show is also appointed to air on Channel 3 SD (Number 28) in 2017.
