= Pongpol Panyamit =

Thai actor, model and singer (born 2003)

- ปองพล ปัญญามิตร
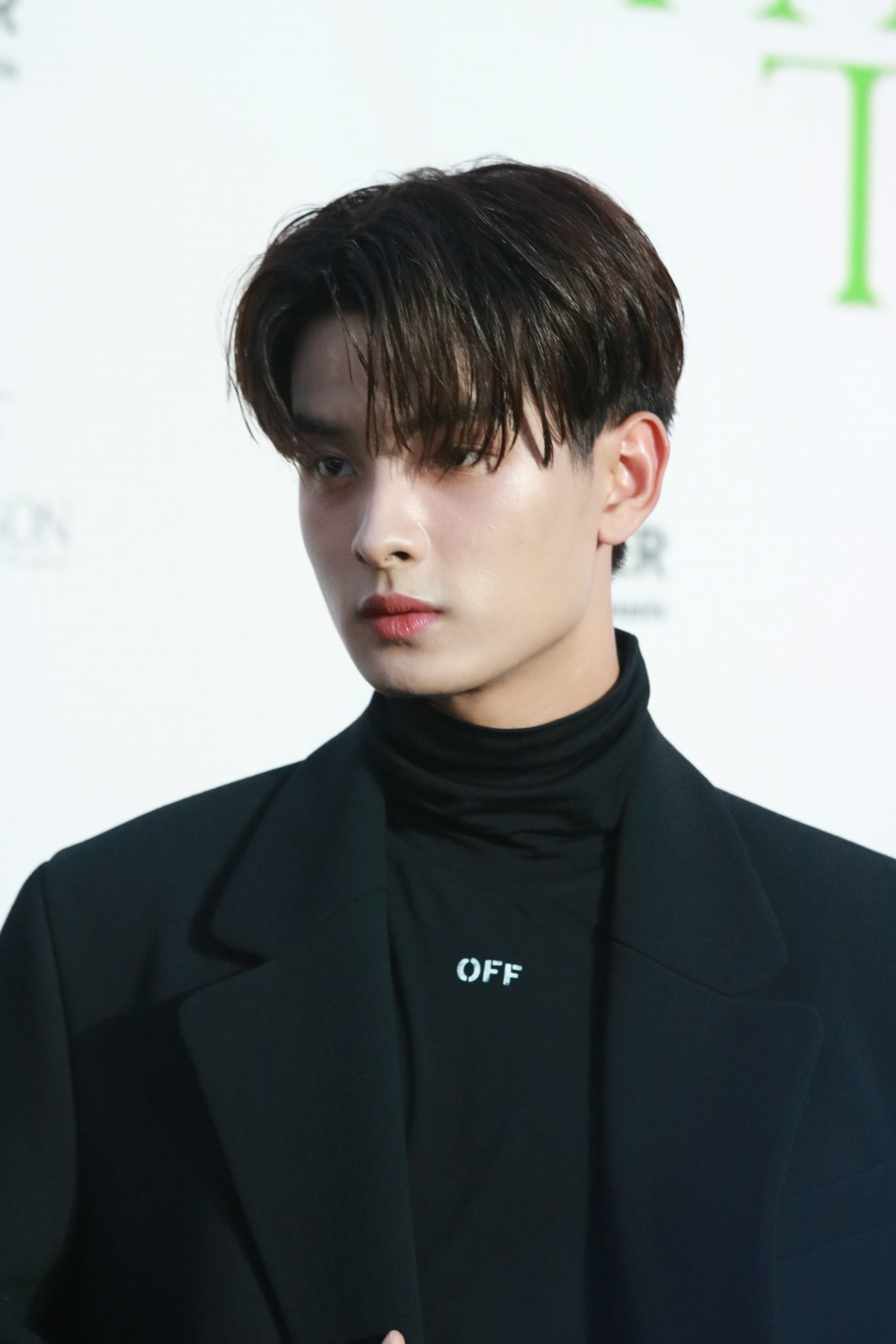
- Khunpol in 2024
- Born: 17 March 2003 (age 23); Bangkok, Thailand
- Other name: Khunpol
- Occupations: Actor; singer; rapper
- Years active: 2020–present
- Agent: Sonray Music
- Notable work: Bas in I Told Sunset About You

Pongpol Panyamit (Thai: ปองพล ปัญญามิตร; born 17 March 2003), nicknamed Khunpol (Thai: ขุนพล), is a Thai actor, singer, rapper, and dancer. He initially debuted as an actor and is currently a member of Thai boy group BUS, formed by Sonray Music. He is known for his role as Bas in I Told Sunset About You (2021) during his acting debut. Alongside his acting career, he is known as a contestant in 789 Survival (2023), a survival reality television show which later on debuted his current group BUS.

== Early life and education ==
Pongpol was born in Bangkok, Thailand. He is the oldest son in the family with a younger sister. He attended Suankularb Wittayalai School in Bangkok from middle to high school. In higher education, he is currently a junior at the Faculty of Communication Arts, Chulalongkorn University.

He grew up in an academic-oriented family which wanted him to pursue scholarly jobs or established career. During adolescent years, he did several school activities such as cheerleader and acting club at the high school. He was a cheerleader in Jaturamitr Samakkee, the traditional football games of boys' schools in Thailand, and received attention on social media for the first time. In the meanwhile, he participated in the drama club of Suankularb Wittayalai School, where one of Nadao Bangkok's actor scouts discovered him and persuaded him to join the audition programme of Nadao Academy. He won the audition for the artist training programme, and was concurrently cast for his first TV series I Told Sunset About You.

== Career ==
=== 2020: Acting debut ===
Pongpol debuted as an actor under Nadao Bangkok in 2020. His first television series is I Told Sunset About You (2020). He played the second male lead role as Bas, a high school student from Phuket, Thailand, who had a crush on his close friend Oh-aew, played by Krit Amnuaydechkorn (PP). In the second season of the TV series, he made a cameo appearance in I Promised You The Moon (2021) in the last episode.

In correlation to I Told Sunset About You, he was invited as a guest artist in Fantopia 2020 concert taken place at Impact Area in. He performed two songs along with Krit Amnuaydechkorn (PP) and with Putthipong Assaratanakul (Billkin).

In 2021, he was nominated for Asia Star Prize in Seoul International Drama Awards 2021. He travelled to Seoul, South Korea and attended the awards ceremony together with his I Told Sunset About You co-stars Krit and Putthipong.

=== 2021–2022: Hiatus and training days ===
After Pongpol decided to pursue an idol career, his former agent asked him to decide whether to remain in acting career or switch to idol training programme. He decided to pursue his dream of becoming a T-pop idol, rejected all the acting projects and start over the training programme which brought him into the hiatus period.

=== 2023–present: Artist debut under BUS ===
After one year of training, he participated in 789 Survival (2023) in the center position of the theme song Limit Break. He was selected as a member of the debut group of twelve members. On 6 December 2023, he debuted as a member of BUS with the debut song "Because of You, I Shine". Later in February 2024, the group released "Watch You Step".

On his solo projects, he participated in Off-White Be Right Back fashion show at Mint Awards 2024 ceremony in Bangkok on 7 September. In October 2024, he starred in PP Krit's Friend to Friend music video as a co-male lead.

== Filmography ==
=== Television series ===
Year	Title	Role	Network	Notes
2020	I Told Sunset About You	Bas	Line TV	Main role
2021	I Promised You the Moon	Bas	One 31	Cameo role

=== Music video appearances ===
Year	Title	Artist	Ref.
2020	"Khot Phiset"	Putthipong Assaratanakul (Billkin)	
2022	"Tha Ter Mai Kid Arai"	Saharat Thiempan	
2024	"Bye Bye"	D-NA	
2024	"Friend to Friend"	Krit Amnuaydechkorn (PP Krit)	

=== Television show ===
Year	Title	Network	Notes	Ref.
2023	789 Survival	One 31	Friday; 26 May 2023 – 11 August 2023	
2024	Bussing Thailand	One 31	Saturday; 15 June 2024 – 29 June 2024, 6 July 2024 – 7 August 2024	

== Discography ==
=== 789 Survival ===
Year	Title	Artist	Ref.
2023	"Limit Break 24"	789 Trainee	
2023	"This Time"	789 Trainee	
2023	"Blind Spot"	BUS because of you i shine	
2023	"Road Trip"	BUS because of you i shine	
2023	"Forget Me Not"	BUS because of you i shine	

=== BUS because of you i shine ===
Year	Title	Album	Notes	Ref.
2023	"Because of You, I Shine"			
2024	"Watch Your Step"			
2024	"Brother Zone"		BUS7 Unit	
2024	"Liar"			
2024	"Transformer"			
2024	"Happily Missing You"			
2025	"Bow Wow"			
2025	"Because of You, I Shine" (Japanese ver.)			

=== Special single ===
Year	Title	Artist	Notes	Ref.
2024	"Feeling Bab Wa Ooh!"	BUS because of you i shine	Summer special song sponsored by Nestlé Pure Life	
2024	"Feaw"	BUS because of you i shine	Bussing Thailand OST	
2024	"Good Quality Picture"	BUS because of you i shine	Bussing Thailand OST	

=== Concert ===
Year	Title	Notes	Ref.
2020	Fantopia	Guest	
2022	The Last Twilight	Finale concert of I Told Sunset About You	
2024	Billkin & PP Krit Double Trouble Concert	Guest	
2025	BUS The 1st Concert Light the World	Main performer	

== Awards and nominations ==
Award nominations for Pongpol Panyamit
Year	Award	Category	Nominee(s)	Result	Ref.
2021	Yniverse Awards 2020	Most Popular Second Male Lead	I Told Sunset About You	Won	
2021	Line TV Awards 2021	Line TV Best Rising Star	I Told Sunset About You	Nominated	
2021	Seoul International Drama Awards 2021	Asian Star Prize	I Told Sunset About You	Nominated	
2021	Siam Series Awards 2021	Most Popular New Actor	I Told Sunset About You	Won	
