= Kung Fu Tootsie =

- Theatrical release poster
- Directed by: Jaturong Mokjok
- Written by: Jaturong Mokjok
- Produced by: Chenchonnee Soonthornsaratul; Jira Maligool; Yongyoot Thongkongtoon; Jaturong Mokjok
- Starring: Sittichai Pabchompoo
- Cinematography: Panya Nimchareonpong
- Edited by: Sunit Asavinikul; Muanfun Uppatham
- Music by: Giant Wave; Sittichai Srichaiyantra; Channasa Mattaphan; Mongkol Pongwachirin; Pravit Kadkasem
- Distributed by: GMM Tai Hub
- Release date: 19 July 2007
- Running time: 92 minutes
- Country: Thailand
- Language: Thai

Kung Fu Tootsie (Thai: ตั๊ดสู้ฟุด or Tat soo foot) is a 2007 Thai action comedy film written and directed by Jaturong Mokjok. The film won the Best Costumes Award at the Suphannahong National Film Awards.

== Title ==
The English title of the film is an allusion to the 1982 American comedy film Tootsie. A Thai slang term for transvestite or effeminate man, toot (ตุ๊ด), comes from the first syllable of Tootsie. The Thai name of the film, Tat soo foot is a Thai spoonerism for toot soo fat, which translates roughly as "butt-kicking sissy" and carries explicit gay overtones.

== Plot ==
Kung Fu Tootsie is set in Hong Kong, the story of Tien and Tao, twins separated at birth. When Tao, living with his wealthy mafioso father, Ma Yong Hai, is mutilated by a rival gang, Ma must find his lost son Tien, living in poverty with his mother, to become the next head of the family.

Antics ensue, however, when Tien turns out to be more 'Sonny and Cher' than 'Sonny Corleone'.

== Cast ==
- Sittichai Pabchompoo (Boy) as Tien
- Koti Arambawy as Kaytree
- Jim Chuancheun as Mha-yonghai
- Erik Markus Schuetz as Mr. Jonas
- Jaturong Mokjok as Foey
- Kreangsak Riantong as Sienpau
- Pokchat Thiamchai as Poey-Poey
- Note Chern-Yim
- Tanai Sripinyo

== Accolades ==
The film received the Suphannahong National Film Award for the Best costumes.

== Reception ==
The film was described as entertaining and visually appealing. It was a considerable commercial success in Thailand.
