= Tada Entertainment =

Thai media company

Tada Entertainment Co., Ltd.
- Native name: บริษัททาดา เอ็นเทอร์เทนเมนท์ จำกัด
- Formerly: Nadao Bangkok
- Type: Private
- Industry: Music; Artist management
- Headquarters: 92/14 Soi Sukhumvit Road 31, Khlong Tan Nuea, Watthana District, Bangkok, Thailand
- Key people: Songyos Sugmakanan (founder and CEO)
- Owners: Songyos Sugmakanan and others

Tada Entertainment Co., Ltd. (Thai: บริษัท ทาดา เอ็นเทอร์เทนเมนท์ จำกัด) is a Thai media company, doing business in idol artist management. Headed by Songyos Sugmakanan, it was originally founded in 2009 as Nadao Bangkok and relaunched for its current venture in 2022. The company has two subsidiary music labels: ILY Lab and Sonray Music, which cover female and male idol groups, respectively.

== History ==
The company was originally founded as Nadao Bangkok on 9 September 2009, and operated as an actor management agency serving the film studio GTH (later GDH 559), of which it was a partial subsidiary. Songyos, a film director affiliated with GTH, was its largest shareholder and CEO. The company later expanded into television and music production, but ended its business activities on 1 June 2022. GDH CEO Jina Osothsilp cited Songyos' requestioning of his passion as reason for the change, as GDH offloaded its stake in the company.

The company registration for Nadao Bangkok had its name changed to Tada Entertainment Co., Ltd. on 29 September 2022. On 1 February 2023, Songyos announced the company's relaunch in the idol artist management business, together with subsidiary labels ILY LAB and SONRAY MUSIC, which would cover female and male artists, respectively. The company also introduced MXFRUIT, a five-member female group, and 789 Survival, a reality music competition "survival" show, which would determine the line-up of its first male group.

789 Survival was broadcast on One 31 from 26 May to 11 August 2023. It featured twenty-four contestants, with the twelve finalists forming the group BUS because of you i shine. Ten of the other contestants were later formed into the group DICE.

== Artists ==
=== MXFRUIT ===
MXFRUIT was a female group with five members: Michaela Olivia Baker (Miquella), Prava Rattana (Oppapech), Skawduan Simons (Skawduan), Yatichapat Hanbenjapong (Knomjean) and Rochelle Labreze (Rochelle). They debuted on 8 March 2023 with the single "Strawberry Ice Cream". MXFRUIT disbanded on 31 December 2025.

=== BUS ===
BUS (because of you i shine) is a male group with twelve members, formed from the finalists of 789 Survival. They are: Pasawee Sriarunotai (Alan), Kris Kanchanatip (Marckris), Pongpol Panyamit (Khunpol), Chuthiwat Jankane (Heart), Jinwook Kim (Jinwook), Chayanon Phakthin (Thai), Nattakit Chaemdara (Nex), Tatchai Limpanyakul (Phutatchai), Dechawat Pondechaphiphat (Copper), Ashirakorn Suvitayasatian (AA), T Boonsermsuwong (Jungt), and Wasupon Pornpananurak (Peemwasu). They debuted with the eponymous single "Because of You, I Shine" on 6 December 2023.

=== DICE ===
DICE is a male group with ten members, formed from the remaining contestants of 789 Survival. They are: Thanakrit Yingwattanakul (Min), Alexander Buckland (Alex), Kansopon Wirunnithiphon (Jay), Wachirakon Raksasuwan (Apo), Akira Kim (Jisang), Aphinat Piamkunvanich (Obo), Chayapol Khieoiem (Cheese), Maddoc Rees Davies (Maddoc), Sippavitch Pongwachirint (Otto), and Tannanat Sittipankul (Frame). They debuted on 19 March 2024 with the single "Mona Lisa".
