= Songyos Sugmakanan =

Thai film director and producer (born 1973)

- ทรงยศ สุขมากอนันต์
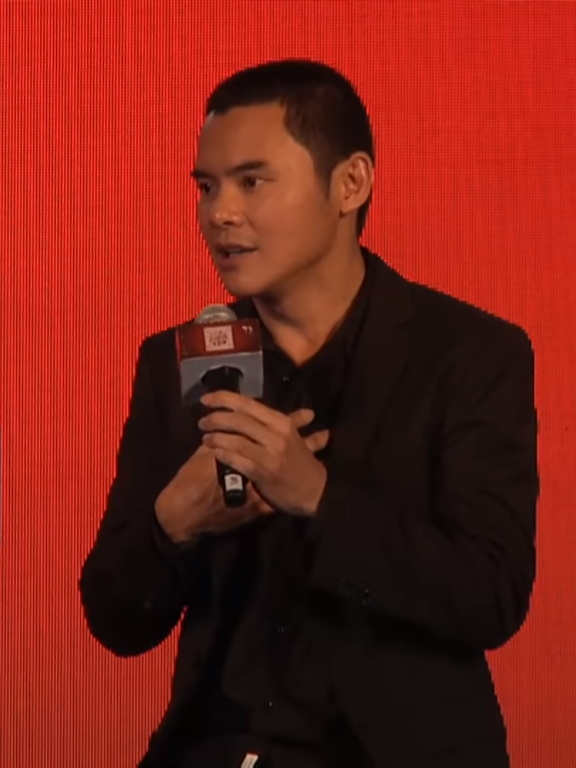
- Songyos in 2018
- Born: August 20, 1973 (age 53); Bangkok, Thailand
- Other name: Yong (ย้ง)
- Occupations: Film director; screenwriter
- Years active: 2002–present
- Notable work: Dorm (Dek Hor) (2006); Hormones: The Series (2013); In Family We Trust (2018)

Songyos Sugmakanan (Thai: ทรงยศ สุขมากอนันต์; RTGS: Songyot Sukmak-a-nan; born 20 August 1973), nicknamed Yong (ย้ง), is a Thai film director and producer, best known for film and television work done with the studio GTH/GDH 559, and as CEO of its subsidiary Nadao Bangkok, later Tada Entertainment.

Songyos graduated from Chulalongkorn University's Faculty of Communication Arts, and made his directorial debut as one of the six directors of the 2003 hit Fan Chan, which led to the formation of GTH. He continued to produce other works with the studio, focusing on youth dramas, including Dorm (2006), Hormones (2008), and The Billionaire (2011). In 2013, he spearheaded GTH's branching into television through the creation of Hormones: The Series, which became immensely popular and initiated a wave of Thai teen dramas. He was CEO of Nadao Bangkok, a talent management agency and partial subsidiary of GTH/GDH 559, until 2022, when the company was relaunched as the music label Tada Entertainment.

== Filmography ==
- My Elephant (Dore Dek Chore Chang) (2002) - short film
- Fan Chan (My Girl) (2003) - co-directed
- Dorm (Dek Hor) (2006)
- Hormones (Pidtermyai Huajai Wawoon) (2008)
- Phobia 2 (2009) – Segment: "Backpackers"
- The Billionaire (2011)
- Coffie Prince (2012) - Remake of Korean drama
- Hormones (2013) - TV series
- In Family We Trust (2018)
