= Dorm (film) =

Dek hor
- The Thai movie poster.
- Directed by: Songyos Sugmakanan
- Written by: Chollada Teaosuwan; Vanridee Pongsittisak; Songyos Sugmakanan
- Produced by: Yodphet Sudsawad
- Starring: Charlie Trairat; Chintara Sukapatana
- Cinematography: Niramon Ross
- Edited by: Pongsatorn Kosolpothisup
- Music by: Chumpol Sepswadi
- Distributed by: GTH
- Release date: 2 February 2006
- Running time: 110 minutes
- Country: Thailand
- Language: Thai

Dek hor (Thai: เด็กหอ, also Dorm or My School) is a 2006 Thai horror-drama film directed by Songyos Sugmakanan.

== Plot ==
In Thailand, young Ton Chatree (Trairat) is sent to a boarding school by his father to get good grades and does not tell his mother about his father having an affair. Once in the school, Ton feels like an outcast and misses his family and friends. His new schoolmates tell ghost stories about a boy who died in the school swimming pool and a young pregnant woman who committed suicide. The stories frighten him, thereby exacerbating Ton's difficulties adjusting to the school. However, Ton becomes close friends with another lonely boy, Vichien (Chienthaworn), who Ton later discovers is the boy who drowned, and his death repeats every night. Ton finds a way to help his friend rest in peace.

At the same time, Ms. Pranee (Sukapatana), the school administrator, is deeply troubled by Vichien's death because she believes incorrectly that Vichien committed suicide and that it was partly her fault. At the end of the movie, Ton tells Pranee the truth, that Vichien's death was an accident and that Pranee should not blame herself.

== Cast ==
- Charlie Trairat as Ton
- Chintara Sukapatana as Ms. Pranee
- Sirachuch Chienthaworn as Vichien
- Suttipong Tudpitakkul as Ton's father
- Jirat Sukchaloen as Peng
- Thanabodin Sukserisup as Doc Nui
- Pakasit Pantural as Pok
- Nipawan Taweepornsawan as Ton's mother

== Reception ==
=== Box office and critical reception ===
The film was screened at the 2006 Bangkok International Film Festival. It opened in wide release in Thailand on February 23, 2006, and was the No. 1 film that weekend, earning nearly US$544,000. The film has had theatrical releases in Singapore and Malaysia and at other film festivals, including the Pusan International Film Festival.

It received praise from critics for the performances of the child actors and Chintara Sukapatana, as well as for its color-drained photography and the production design of the old boarding school.

== Production ==
The film was co-written and directed by Songyos Sugmakanan, one of the six directors of the 2003 hit Thai film Fan Chan, which also starred Charlie Trairat. The film was critically acclaimed in Thailand, where it won more honors than any other film, including best picture from the Bangkok Critics Assembly.

=== Awards ===
- 2007 Berlin Film Festival – Crystal Bear Award for best film in Generation Kplus competition, awarded by 11-member children's jury.
- 2007 Fajr International Film Festival – Crystal Simorgh for best director in the Spiritual Films Competition.
- Thailand National Film Association Awards
  - Best editing
  - Best art direction
- Golden Doll Awards
  - Best actor (Charlie Trairat)
  - Best actress (Chintara Sukapatana)
  - Best script
- Bangkok Critics Assembly Awards
  - Best picture
  - Best director (Songyos Sugmakanan)
  - Best script
  - Best cinematography
- Starpics Awards
  - Best picture
  - Best supporting actress (Chintara Sukapatana)
  - Best script
  - Best editing
- Kom Chad Luek Awards
  - Best supporting actor (Sirachuch Chienthaworn)
  - Best supporting actress (Chintara Sukapatana)

== See also ==
- List of ghost films
