= Focus Jirakul =

Thai actress

- โฟกัส จีระกุล
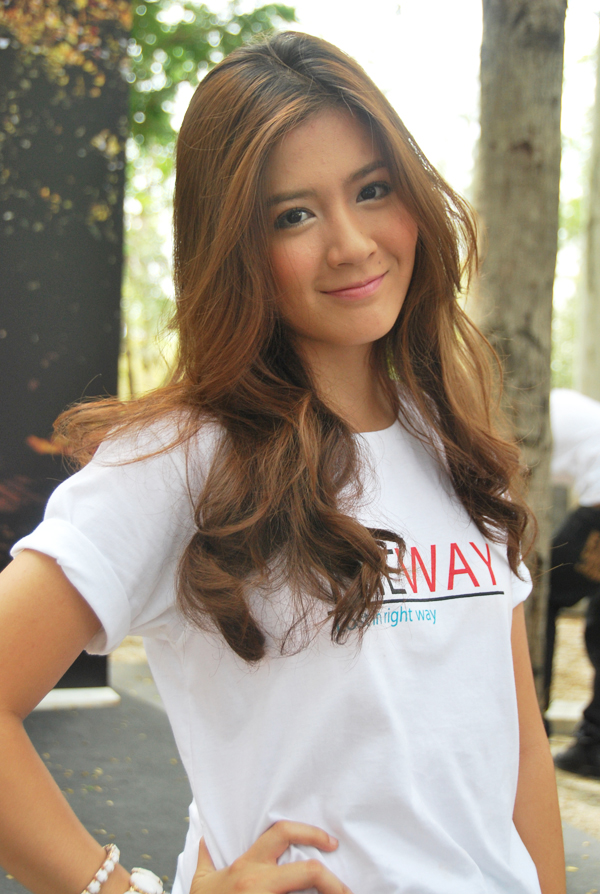
- Born: 14 February 1993 (age 33); Bangkok, Thailand
- Other names: Focus Jeerakul; Fokat Chirakun
- Occupation: actress
- Years active: 2003–present

Focus Jirakul (Thai: โฟกัส จีระกุล) (born 14 February 1993) is a Thai actress.

== Biography ==
Her first leading role was as a child actress in the film Fan Chan (My Girl) in 2003. She is also a lead actress in the television series U-Prince: Absolute Economist season (2016-2017) as well as Monhak Transistor (2018), a 26-episode adaptation of the film Monrak Transistor directed by Chukiat Sakveerakul.

== Filmography ==
- 2003: Fan Chan (แฟนฉัน / My Girl)
- 2006: The Possible (เก๋า..เก๋า)
- 2007: Charlotte's Web (ให้เสียงไทย เด็กหญิงเฟิร์น อราเบิ้ล)
- 2007: Ghost Mother (ผีเลี้ยงลูกคน)
- 2008: Hormones (ปิดเทอมใหญ่ หัวใจว้าวุ่น)
- 2012: Seven Something (รัก 7 ปี ดี 7 หน)
- 2012: 3AM (ตีสาม 3D)
- 2014: The Eyes Diary (คนเห็นผี)
- 2017: Doraemon (โดราเอมอน เดอะมูฟวี ตอน โนบิตะกับกำเนิดญี่ปุ่น)
