= Phobia 2 =

2009 Thai film

- Film poster
- Directed by: Paween Purijitpanya; Visute Poolvoralaks; Songyos Sugmakanan; Parkpoom Wongpoom; Banjong Pisanthanakun
- Written by: Mez Tharatorn; Chantavit Dhanasevi; Songyos Sugmakanan; Sopana Chaowwiwatkul; Sophon Sakdaphisit; Parkpoom Wongpoom; Nitis Napichayasutin; Banjong Pisanthanakun; Paween Purijitpanya
- Produced by: Paiboon Damrongchaitham; Bussaba Daoreung; Visute Poonvoralaks; Jina Osotsilp; Chenchonnee Soontornsantool; Yongyoot Thongkongtoon; Wunruedee Pongsittisuk; Suwimon Thechasupinunt; Prant Thadaweerawatr
- Starring: Jirayu Laongmanee; Worrawech Danuwong; Charlie Trairat; Nicole Theriault; Marsha Wattanapanich
- Cinematography: Jira Maligool; Naruphol Chokanapitak; Niramon Ross; Somboon Piriyapukdeekul; Paween Purijitpanya
- Edited by: Paween Purijitpanya; Thammarat Sumetsupachok; Boonsak Vattanavisith
- Music by: Chatchai Pongprapaphan; Terdsak Janpan
- Production company: Jorkwang Films
- Distributed by: GTH
- Release date: 9 September 2009
- Running time: 120 minutes
- Country: Thailand
- Language: Thai
- Box office: 64.4 million baht

Phobia 2, also known as Ha Phrang, (Thai: ห้าแพร่ง or 5 แพร่ง) is a 2009 Thai anthology supernatural horror film consisting of five shorts: "Novice" directed by Paween Purijitpanya, "Ward" by Visute Poolvoralaks, "Backpackers" by Songyos Sugmakanan, "Salvage" by Parkpoom Wongpoom, and "In the End" by Banjong Pisanthanakun. It is the sequel to the 2008 anthology horror film 4bia.

== Synopsis ==
Phobia 2 is dissected into five shorts stories as follows:

=== Novice ===
"Novice" (หลาวชะโอน; "Nibung") directed by Paween Purijitpanya.

14-year-old rebellious delinquent Pey repeatedly commits crimes by throwing rocks at oncoming cars before looting them. One day, he throws a rock at the car of his own father, failing to recognize it. His father dies immediately.

To protect Pey, his mother has him ordained at a remote temple in a southern forest. At the temple, Pey witnesses an annual ceremony of feeding the ghost being punished for its sinful deeds. That night, the hungry Pey leaves his monastic cell to find something to eat, something forbidden by the precepts. Pey eats the offerings dedicated to the ghost, before getting caught and brought back to his cell. The next morning, the monks inspect the area Pey entered and see that the nibung tree where the ghost's offerings were placed was broken. A senior monk says this is an omen indicating the time for the departure of the existing ghost and the coming of a new ghost.

As days pass, Pey finds the strict precepts unbearable. Moreover, he feels like he has been followed by the ghost. He decides to leave the monkhood, pushing away the aged abbot who begs him to stay to clean his mind a little bit more. Out of the forest, he is stopped by his preceptor who leads him to a cave with Buddha images and instructs him to meditate to calm himself down and realise the wrong he has done.

That night, Pey again decides to leave the monkhood due to unrest in his mind after he recalls his wrongful deeds. While he is walking out of the forest, he feels like something is following him. He then throws rocks at it but the rocks come back to him and hit him at his face that he becomes severely disfigured. Pey attempts to call his mother for help but she only hears a high pitched cry like that of a punished ghost according to traditional belief. Tearfully repenting his crimes, Pey transforms into the new ghost.

=== Ward ===
"Ward" (ห้องเตียงรวม; "Shared Room") was directed by Visute Poolvoralaks.

After crashing his bike and fractures both legs, teenager Arthit spends the night in a hospital. Moved into a shared room, he sees an old shaman in a coma. The man's life support is scheduled to be terminated the following days, after his relatives and students have the chance to say goodbye.

As the night progresses, Arthit begins to see strange things, such as a tray of food left for the old man disappearing. He requests to be moved to another room, to no avail. Seeing Arthit refuses to remain there, the nurse forcibly puts him to sleep through injection of hypnotic. Later, Arthit is suddenly awakened by the old man walking on his chest and reciting spells. The old man then attacks him and vomits blood into his mouth, rendering him unconscious.

The next morning, Arthit is discharged. The old man's students, amongst whom are the nurse and some other hospital staff members, bow to Arthit, implying the body has been taken over by the shaman.

=== Backpackers ===
"Backpacker" was directed by Songyos Sugmakanan.

Two Japanese travelers (a boy and a girl) try to hitch a ride through the Thai countryside. The Japanese boy waves a thousand baht note at a passing truck, which stops to pick them up. The driver, a rough-looking man, immediately extorts them for more money. His companion, a young man named Joi who refers to the older as 'boss', tries to dissuades him from taking the passengers. Soon after, the travelers become uneasy when the driver repeatedly gets phone calls that sets him shouting down "don't make trouble!," worsened by continuous loud bangings from the back of the truck.

Eventually, the driver stops the truck. He holds the travelers at gunpoint while he and Joi check the truck. Opening the cargo hold, they were shocked to discover it filled with dead bodies. Flashbacks reveal that the two are drug runners; and the dead bodies are drug mules, who were supposed to be alive. The boy successfully grabs the gun, but the dead bodies reanimate and kill him. The two men and the girl get back to the truck and drive away, but the driver crashes the truck and is killed by the zombies.

At evening, Joi and the girl wake up to find that bodies have become motionless. Joi checks finds the driver dead with his stomach cut open. The Japanese girl sees a corpse of a boy return to life, seemingly innocent. The Japanese girl shoots Joi dead when he tries to unsuccessfully convince her to abandon the boy due to a language barrier. She and the boy drive off in a stray car (which crashed the truck earlier). Arriving at a market, the Japanese girl tries to shoot the boy while he sleeps, but he suddenly wakes up and kills her before running towards the market maniacally.

=== Salvage ===
"Salvage" (รถมือสอง; "Second Hand Car") was directed by Parkpoom Wongpoom.

Nuch makes a living by restoring severely damaged cars, many from fatal accidents, and reselling them to unsuspecting buyers.

One night after closing the car garage, Nuch discovers her son, Toey, is missing. She tries to look for her son in her compound and is spooked by the ghosts of accident victims, including a mutilated vendor, a boy stuck in a car wheel, and a woman with her belly cut open, revealing her dangling intestines. Nuch gets locked in a car and witnesses how a victim got burnt to death in the car during an accident. Eventually she manages to escape to find that all of the refurbished cars have returned to their original destroyed state.

Nuch tries to drive away with her own car, but the engine sounds weird and suddenly dies. She steps out and finds her son's shoe in front of the car. Bracing herself for the worst, Nuch opens the bonnet of the car. There, she finds her little boy, incinerated by the engine of the car. The part ends with Nuch crying motionlessly to her body-squashed dead little son.

=== In the End ===
"In the End" (คนกอง; "Crew") was directed by Banjong Pisanthanakun.

Ter, Puak, Shin and Aey are the movie crew of an upcoming ghost/horror movie Alone 2, starring Marsha as the lead character and Kate, who is sick, as the ghost. They are shooting the last scene where the ghost appears crawling out of a dark hallway, but Kate collapses. Aey takes Kate to a hospital, at which the doctor later tells Aey that "the patient has died". Thinking that Kate would be unable to join the filming, the crew discuss a possible ending change. But Kate appears in the set shortly and seems alive enough, prompting the change to be reversed.

Kate asks Shin to take her to the toilet at the same time when Aey phones him, telling him that Kate has died. Shocked, he passes Kate to Marsha and tells Ter and Puak about Kate's death. The rest of the studio (except Marsha) overhear their conversation through the microphone and hastily leave the set. Having no choice, the three and an oblivious Marsha decide to shoot the final scene to appease Kate's wish to complete the film. However, the power gets off and a ghostly Kate pursues Ter, Puak and Shin who drive off the set, leaving a confused Marsha behind.

The trio see Aey standing alone on the road and pick him up. When they see the wreckage of his car crashed into another vehicle, they initially think that Aey had died and his ghost is haunting them. Aey tells them that he is still alive and he managed to leave his car with minor injuries before the other car hit him. Kate suddenly appears, much to their shock. However, she tells them that she is not a ghost; she secretly left the hospital to join the crew and the doctor whom Aey met is the twin of another doctor. One of the twin doctors is in charge of Kate, the other was in charge of another dead patient and informed Aey of the patient's death because he mistook Aey for the deceased's relative. As they wave for a car to bring Kate back to the hospital, a car driven by a sleepy Marsha crashes all of them off.

- Note: The characters of Ter, Puak, Shin, and Aey also starred in the short story "The Man In The Middle" from 4bia, the film's predecessor. The fictional film Alone 2 is likely an allusion to director Banjong Pisanthanakun's previous film Alone, also starring Marsha Wattanapanich as the lead character.

== Cast ==
Novice

- Jirayu La-ongmanee as Pae
- Apasiri Nitibhon as Pae's Mother
- Choomporn Theppitak as Abbot
- Ray MacDonald as Senior Monk
- Sirisak Saa-ang as Jinn
- Sapon Parpanurak as Pae's Father
- Bunthaung Navaprapakun as Awat
- Jara Muanprayun as Sitting on the Spear Tree
- Pichit Sriburin as Spear Tree 1
- Apisit Chaikeenee as Spear Tree 2
- Na-rut Nangthong as Spear Tree 3
- Bunthua Thonganong as Spear Tree 4
- Udon Srisawad as Monk 1
- Sombut Maolichat as Monk 2
- Pongpon Theppitak as Monk 3
- Chuchep Chantasuthon as Monk 4
- Leang Thansara as Monk 5
- Boonsong Wasungneun as Monk 6

Ward

- Worrawech Danuwong as Arthit
- Sarinrat Thomas as Senior Nurse
- Chartpawee Treechartchawanwong as Junior Nurse
- Gacha Plienwithi as Shaman
- Kittiphong Dumaviphat as Surgeon
- Yuttichai Jearakul as Leader's Disciple
- Nikorn Chawpaknum as Disciple 1
- Tanawat Puangkitsap as Disciple 2
- Settapol Kammung as Disciple 3
- Chayapol Nitiyanontakit as Disciple 4
- Sarawut Tumasare as Jack
- Kunyamas Maneenak as Nurse 1
- Arun Kamsorn as Nurse 2
- Aree Kamsorn as Nurse 3
- Datinee Somsrepang as Nurse 4
- Chedkreat Nuaninn as Male Nurse 1
- Teetipun Ponglaokum as Male Nurse 2

Backpackers

- Charlie Trairat as Joi
- Suteerush Channukool as Driver
- Akiko Ozeki as Japanese Tourist
- Theerneth Yuki Tanaka as Japanese Tourist
- Danaipat Labpipat as The Boy
- Narin Changpian as Zombie 1
- Sarocha Promyen as Zombie 2
- Somchai Satahnphong as Zombie 3
- Sittichai Intoon as Zombie 4
- Rungnapah Boamee as Zombie 5

Salvage

- Nicole Theriault as Nuch
- Peeratchai Roompol as Toey
- Suchada Poonpattanasuk as Angry Woman
- Akekachai Sangpreang as Mechanic
- Jakala Hormchan as Husband Bought a Car
- Anunya Wongwatanakun as Wife Bought a Car
- Siripot Puangnok as Security Guard
- Wankor Jantongknaw as Garland Seller Ghost
- Karuna Morris as Crying Woman Ghost
- Yosakorn Tansara as Child Ghost
- Suchada Chankhonkaen as Fire Girl Ghost

In The End

- Marsha Wattanapanich as Marsha
- Nattapong Chartpong as Ter
- Kantapat Permpoonpatcharasuk as Aey
- Wiwat Krongrasri as Shin
- Pongsatorn Jongwilas as Phuak
- Phijitra Ratsameechawalit as Ked
- Nimit Lugsameepong as Film Director
- Chiew-wech Dontri as Truck Driver
- O-lan Suleeporn as Twin Doctor 1
- O-pas Suleeporn as Twin Doctor 2
- Ratsameekae Amphawat as Hospital Patients
- Patcharaporn Hitanun as Nurse
- Sittipong Wongvilas as Male Nurse 1
- Prawit Boonnithipaisit as Male Nurse 2
- Chukiat Norongrit as Director of Photography for Twins 2
- Thammarat Sumetsupachok as Camera Assistant
- Banjong Supasee as Makeup Artist
- Prapassorn Chansatitporn as Continue
- Torphong Kul-on as Film Crew 1
- Buncha Sritinon as Film Crew 2
- Boonsak Watanavisit as Film Crew 3

== Production ==
The movie is produced by GTH GMM Thai Hub, following the successful previous film, 4bia.

== Release ==
The movie premiered on 9 September 2009 in Thailand and was part of the 2010 San Diego Comic-Con.

== Reception ==
It was a big hit, making 14.9 Million Baht on its opening day and 64.4 Million Baht in its opening week, one of the highest in Thailand's movie history.

== See also ==
- List of ghost films
