= Once Upon a Time (1995 film) =

- Film poster
- Directed by: Bhandit Rittakol
- Written by: Chaninthorn Prasertprasart; Bhandit Rittakol
- Produced by: Charoen Iamphungporn
- Starring: Ronnarong Buranat; Martang Jantranee; Santisuk Promsiri; Chintara Sukapatana
- Cinematography: Wichien Reungwichayakul; Leng-Eui Wanchai
- Edited by: Poonsakdi Uthaiphant
- Music by: Danu Hantrakul
- Distributed by: Five Star Production
- Release date: 28 January 1995
- Running time: 140 minutes
- Country: Thailand
- Language: Thai

Once Upon a Time or Once Upon a Time... This Morning (Thai: กาลครั้งหนึ่งเมื่อเช้านี้ or Kalla khrung nueng... muea chao nee) is a 1995 Thai drama film directed by Bhandit Rittakol. The film was selected as the Thai entry for the Best Foreign Language Film at the 68th Academy Awards, but was not accepted as a nominee.

== Cast ==
- Ronnarong Buranat
- Martang Jantranee
- Santisuk Promsiri
- Chintara Sukapatana
- Charlie Trairat

== See also ==
- List of submissions to the 68th Academy Awards for Best Foreign Language Film
- List of Thai submissions for the Academy Award for Best Foreign Language Film
