= Lucky Loser (2006 film) =

Lucky Loser (Mak Tae)
- The revised movie poster for the edited version of the film.
- Directed by: Adisorn Tresirikasem
- Written by: Adisorn Trisirikasem; Aummaraporn Phandintong
- Produced by: Jira Maligool; Chenchonnee Soonthornsaratul; Yongyoot Thongkongtoon; Prasert Vivattanananpong
- Starring: Jakrit Panichpatikam; Noi Po-ngam
- Cinematography: Arnon Chunprasert
- Edited by: Boonsak Watanavisit; Surawut Tungkarak; Vijjapat Kojew
- Music by: Soontorn Yodsritong
- Distributed by: GMM Tai Hub
- Release date: 19 October 2006
- Running time: 113 minutes
- Country: Thailand
- Language: Thai

Lucky Loser (Thai: หมากเตะ..โลกตะลึง or Mak Tae Loke Talueng) is a 2006 Thai sports-comedy about a small, fictional Southeast Asian country's bid to play in the World Cup. Initially, the country depicted in the film was Laos, but because of concerns by diplomatic officials that the depiction of Lao players would be seen as offensive to Lao people, the film was delayed from an original May 2006 release date. The film's production company, GMM Tai Hub, re-edited the film and reshot some scenes to remove any references to Laos. The name of the fictional country is Arvee.

== Plot ==
But when there's an opening for coach of the Thailand national team, Pong returns in hopes he'll be named for the job. Instead, he is passed over in favor of a Brazilian coach.

His Aunt Ming, a football fan and inveterate gambler, has just won the lottery and had intended on donating her winnings to the Thai team. However, when her nephew is passed over, she decides to give her money to a regional rival, the struggling team in neighboring Arvee. And she's able to convince the team officials to hire her nephew.

So Pong is named coach of the Arvee side. He sets about filling the team's vacancies with players who display various talents. A man who catches watermelons becomes the goalkeeper. The town's aggressive dogcatcher becomes an attacking midfielder. A veteran striker, banned from the game because of his temper, is lured back in.

Coach Pong whips the players into shape. His methods include having the team train inside a freezer container in order to acclimate themselves to playing in colder climates.

For their part, the Arvee players are eager to conform to their ideals of the Western world, dying their hair in an effort to look like the European soccer players they idolize and will possibly play against.

The team at first doesn't follow the coach's strategy, and they lose. Then they listen, and they win. But for their final match, against archrival Thailand, they find their strategies no longer work. So they must revert to their earlier ways and play however they see fit.

At times Coach Pong is conflicted between loyalty to his native country and his desire to see the team he is coaching win.

== Cast ==
- Jakkrit Panichpatikum as Coach Pong
- Noi Po-ngam as Aunt Ming

== Controversy and re-release ==
When the film was due to be released on May 18, 2006, the story was about the national soccer team of Laos. Laotian foreign ministry officials raised concerns that depictions of the Laotian players would be seen as offensive by Lao people and could trigger anti-Thai violence in Laos, similar to the 2003 Phnom Penh riots.

The controversy also came shortly after another Thai film, Ghost Game, sparked outrage among Cambodian officials, because the teen horror movie made light of the atrocities that occurred under the Khmer Rouge and Tuol Sleng Prison.

The movie was completed at a cost of 60 million baht, and for a time it appeared that the film's production company, GMM Tai Hub, would have to permanently shelve the film. But through re-editing and reshooting some scenes to remove any traces of Lao flags and national emblems and creating a fictional country called Arvee, the company was able to release the film. Dialogue was looped so that whenever anyone said "Laos" they instead would say "Arvee."

Remaining prints of the original film were burned at an event witnessed by the film's producers.
