= Hub Ho Hin Bangkok =

Thai media company

Hub Ho Hin Bangkok Co., Ltd. (Thai: หับโห้หิ้น บางกอก) is a Thai media company, working in advertising and filmmaking. It was one of the three partners in the joint-venture studio GMM Tai Hub (GTH), which dissolved in 2015, and is one of the two corporate partners in its successor GDH 559.

Hub Ho Hin was founded in 1991 by Jira Maligool, Yongyoot Thongkongtoon, Jina Osothsilp and Prasert Vivattanananpong, fellow alumni of Chulalongkorn University's Faculty of Communication Arts. The company initially did business in advertising production, and began branching into film production with the 2000 film The Iron Ladies, which was directed by Yongyoot and co-produced with Tai Entertainment, and Jira's 2002 film Mekhong Full Moon Party, co-produced with GMM Pictures through the joint venture Hub Ho Hin Films (2002–2008). Following the success of the three companies' 2003 co-production My Girl, GTH was formed as a joint venture, which lasted until 2015. Hub Ho Hin now holds a 15% stake in GTH's successor GDH 559, which is 51% owned by GMM Grammy. It also has a 10% direct stake in GDH's partial subsidiary Nadao Bangkok.
