= Kanyawee Songmuang =

Thai actress and model (born 1996)

- กัญญาวีร์ สองเมือง
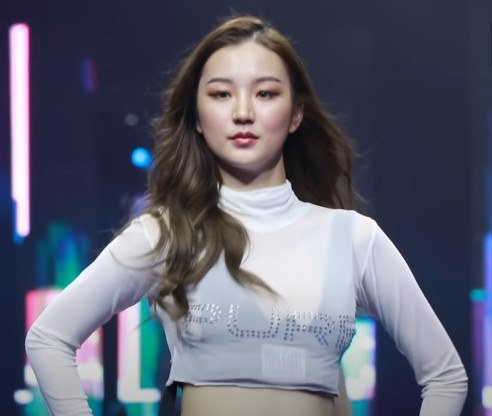
- Thana at Millennials Choice 2020 runway
- Born: Kanyawee Songmuang; 21 July 1996 (age 30); Roi Et Province, Thailand
- Other name: Thanaerng (ต้าเหนิง)
- Occupations: Actress; Model
- Years active: 2014–present
- Notable work: Jane in Hormones; Belle in Senior Secret Love

Kanyawee Songmuang (Thai: กัญญาวีร์ สองเมือง, RTGS: Kanyawi Songmueang, IPA: [kan.jaː.wiː sɔ̌ːŋ.mɯa̯ŋ]; born 21 July 1996), nicknamed Thanaerng (Thai: ต้าเหนิง; RTGS: Ta-noeng; IPA: [tâː.nɤ̌ːŋ]), is a Thai actress and model. She is best known for her lead roles in the television drama Hormones 3 (2015) and Senior Secret Love: My Lil Boy (2016).

== Early life and education ==
Kanyawee Songmuang was born on 21 July 1996 in Roi Et Province, Thailand. She is of Thai-Chinese descent. Currently, she is a student at the College of Interdisciplinary Studies, Thammasat University, where she takes a PPE program.

== Career ==
In 2012, Thana started her entertainment career by joining "Miss Teen Thailand 2012". She participated in "Thailand Super Model 2013". In 2014, she participated in Hormones: The Next Gen and finished up in Top 6.

Thana's career evolved internationally when she starred in Hormones Season 2 as "Jane". In the same year, she acted in the 10th episode of ThirTEEN Terrors as Thitima. In 2015, she reprised her role as "Jane" in Hormones: The Final Season. In 2016, she acted alongside Korapat Kirdpan in Senior Secret Love as "Belle".

In 2022, Thana starred as "Gyb" in two episodes story in Good Old Days: Our Soundtrack, alongside Vachirawit Chivaaree, and her song "Good Times" from the series OST was well received by general public.

== Endorsements ==
Thanaerng is a professional model and is prominent face in the fashion world. She has been in various runways and was part of many brand based promotion and campaigns. She modelled for various brands such as Bottega Veneta, Louis Vuitton, Saint Laurent, Prada, Bvlgari and Dior to name few. She featured in Harper's Bazaar and L'Officiel Singapore. She featured as celebrity guest for Japan Royal Service, a Japan based luxury travel agency. In 2020, Thana was welcomed as Brand Ambassador for Lancôme, Thailand. By November 2023, she had over 4.5M followers in Instagram.

On 11 November 2023, merchandise ASTRO Stuffs opened a pop-up store in Siam Center Thailand, Thana was star guest for the brand.

== Filmography ==
=== Films ===
Year	Title	Ref.
2015	May Who?	
2018	Pretend	
2024	404 Run Run	

=== Television series ===
Year	Title	Role	Ref.
2014	Hormones: The Series - Season 2	Jane	
2015	ThirTEEN Terrors	Thitima	
2015	Hormones: The Series - Final Season	Jane	
2016	Senior Secret Love: My Lil Boy	Belle	
2016	Senior Secret Love: My Lil Boy 2	Belle	
2017	Project S	Fame	
2018	Kiss Me Again	Sanson	
2018	I Stories	Bartender	
2018	In Family We Trust	Kim	
2019	My Ambulance	Banee	
2022	Good Old Days: Story 4: Our Soundtrack	Gyb	

=== Other appearances ===
Year	Title	Label
2014	Hormones 2 Special: Series Introduction	GMM One
2014	Hormones 2 Special: Behind the Scene	GMM One
2015	Hormones 3 Special: Series Introduction	GMM One
2015	Hormones 3 Special: Unseen Hormones	GMM One
2016	Senior Secret Love: My Best Scenes	GMM One
2018	Project S Let's Say Goodbye	GMM 25
2020	Mai Yai War Feun	GMM 25
2022	Good Old Days Soft Opening	GMM 25

=== Variety shows ===
Year	Title	Label
2014	Hormones: The Next Gen	GMM One
2014	Zaaap	Channel 3 GMM One
2015	Tuen Pai Dhamma	GMM One
2015	High School Reunion	GMM 25
2015	Frozen Hormones	GMM One; LINE TV
2015	Talk with Toey Tonight	GMM 25
2018	Nadao's Vlog	GMM 25
2019	10 Fight 10 Season 1	Workpoint TV
2020	GoyNattyDream: Tell Me All About You	
2020	The Wall Song	Workpoint TV; CCND
2022	Good Old Days: Special Interview	GMMTV

== Discography ==
=== Singing journals ===
Year	Song title	Label	Ref.
2019	"It's OK" (Mai Penrai Rok)	Official Video	
2022	"Good Time" (ระหว่างทาง) (with Bright Vachirawit Chivaaree)	GMMTV Records	

=== Music video appearance ===
Year	Song title	Singer	Label	Ref.
2019	"Moon - Happy Anniversary"	Atom Chanakan	OfficialWhite Music	

== Awards ==
Year	Title	Category	Result	Ref.
2014	GHT Award	Next Gen Actress; Hormones	Won	
2020	Joox Thailand Music Awards	Most Stylish Female	Won	
