= Hormones (film) =

2008 Thai film by Songyos Sugmakanan

- Theatrical release poster
- Directed by: Songyos Sugmakanan
- Written by: Prasert Vijitpawan; Thongchai Saelor; Nitis Napichayasutin; Songyos Sugmakanan; Aummaraporn Phandintong; Vanridee Pongsittisak; Nontra Kumwong
- Produced by: Jira Maligool; Chenchonnee Soonthornsaratul; Yongyoot Thongkongtoon; Suwimon Techasupinan
- Starring: Charlie Trairat; Sirachuch Chienthaworn; Focus Jirakul; Ratchu Surachalas; Chutima Teepanat; Chantavit Dhanasevi; Thaniya Ummaritchoti; Ungsumalynn Sirapatsakmetha; Sola Aoi; Lu Ting Wei
- Cinematography: Niramon Ross
- Edited by: Sasikarn Suwansuthi; Nithiwat Tharathorn
- Music by: Terdsak Janpan
- Distributed by: GMM Tai Hub
- Release date: 20 March 2008
- Running time: 122 minutes
- Country: Thailand
- Languages: Thai; Northern Thai; Mandarin; Japanese; English
- Box office: ฿80 million

Hormones (Thai: ปิดเทอมใหญ่ หัวใจว้าวุ่น; RTGS: Pit Thoem Yai Hua Chai Wa Wun) is a 2008 Thai coming-of-age romantic comedy film directed by Songyos Sugmakanan starring Charlie Trairat, Sirachuch Chienthaworn, Focus Jirakul, Ratchu Surachalas, Chutima Teepanat, Chantavit Dhanasevi, Thaniya Ummaritchoti, Ungsumalynn Sirapatsakmetha, Sola Aoi, and Lu Ting Wei and Distributed by GMM Tai Hub. The literal meaning of the Thai title is "Restless Hearts During School Break" or "School Break, Hearts Aflutter".

== Plot ==
The film revolves around a group of high school and university students during their school break, and the relationships that develop (or don't). Four romantic threads are interwoven in the film's plot. Both Pu and Mai are in competition for Nana while class geek Jo is in love with a popular girl C. Meanwhile, Oh Lek is wild about Taiwanese pop sensation Didi, and Hern is thinking of cheating on his girlfriend Nuan when he meets Japanese tourist Aoi.

== Cast ==
- Charlie Trairat as Pu
- Sirachuch Chienthaworn as Mai
- Ungsumalynn Sirapatsakmetha as Nana
- Focus Jirakul as Oh Lek
- Ratchu Surajaras as Jo
- Chutima Teepanat as C
- Thaniya Ummaritchoti as Nuan
- Chantavit Dhanasevi as Hern
- Sola Aoi as Aoi
- Lu Ting Wei as Didi
- Chaleumpol Tikumpornteerawong

== Production ==
Director Sugmakanan admits he was inspired by the format of the British romantic comedy Love Actually but points out that relationships in Asian culture are not comparable to those in Western culture.

The studio was anxious to avoid the possible controversy involved in having Japanese adult video star Sora Aoi in a movie directed at a teen audience, so her name was omitted in promotional materials, although she appears in the trailer. Sugmakanan has said that the segment in which Aoi appears was based on a friend's actual experiences.

== Reception ==
The film saw national release in 163 theatres and earned an unprecedented (for GTH films) 10 million baht on its first day, totalling 34.1 million in its opening weekend. It earned a total of 80 million baht in the box office and was the third-largest grossing Thai film in 2008.

A Daily XPress review of the movie calls it "sexy and funny" as well as "Thought-provoking and nostalgic". The film won the Jury's Special Prize at the fourth Asian Marine Film Festival held in Makuhari, Japan, an award which one journalist ascribes to the presence of Sola Aoi.

== Awards ==
Year	Award	Category	Country	Result
2008	4th Asian Marine Film Festival	The Juries' Special Prize	Japan	Won
2009	6th Starpics Thai Films Awards	Best Picture	Thailand	Won
2009	6th Starpics Thai Films Awards	Best Director	Thailand	Nominated
2009	6th Starpics Thai Films Awards	Best Film Editing	Thailand	Nominated
2009	18th Thai National Film Awards	Best Supporting Actress (Focus Jirakul)	Thailand	Won
2009	18th Thai National Film Awards	Best Costume Design	Thailand	Nominated
2009	17th Bangkok Critics Assembly Awards	Best Picture	Thailand	Nominated
2009	17th Bangkok Critics Assembly Awards	Best Director	Thailand	Nominated
2009	17th Bangkok Critics Assembly Awards	Best Supporting Actor (Ratchu Surajaras)	Thailand	Nominated
2009	17th Bangkok Critics Assembly Awards	Best Supporting Actress (Focus Jirakul)	Thailand	Won
2009	17th Bangkok Critics Assembly Awards	Best Screenplay	Thailand	Nominated
2009	17th Bangkok Critics Assembly Awards	Best Film Editing	Thailand	Nominated
2009	17th Bangkok Critics Assembly Awards	Best Original Score	Thailand	Nominated
2009	6th Hamburger Awards	Best Actress (Focus Jirakul)	Thailand	Won
2009	6th Hamburger Awards	Favourite Scene-Stealing Actress (Sola Aoi)	Thailand	—N/a
2009	6th Hamburger Awards	Best Original Song (รอเธอหันมา – โฟกัส จิระกุล)	Thailand	—N/a
2009	6th Hamburger Awards	Best Original Song (อย่างน้อย – บิ๊กแอส)	Thailand	—N/a
