= Hormones: The Series =

2013-15 Thai television series

- Official logo of season 3
- Also known as: Hormones: The Series
- Genre: Teen drama
- Directed by: Songyos Sugmakanan; Kriangkrai Vachiratamporn
- Starring: See below
- Country of origin: Thailand
- Original language: Thai
- No. of seasons: 3
- No. of episodes: 39 + 6 specials

Production
- Production companies: GTH; Nadao Bangkok

Original release
- Network: GMM One; GTH On Air
- Release: 18 May 2013 – 26 December 2015

Hormones (Full title: Hormones: Wai Wawun, "Hormones: วัยว้าวุ่น"), promoted as Hormones: The Series, is a Thai teen drama television series produced by GTH and first broadcast in 2013. The show follows the lives and relationships of a group of secondary school students as they go through school and home life and face various issues. Breaking the mould of Thai television, which typically features Thai soap operas and sitcoms, Hormones was conceived with a style more commonly found in the U.S. and production values more usually associated with filmmaking. It also distinguished itself by featuring controversial issues such as teenage sex and pregnancy, homosexuality and school violence.

The series' first season was directed by Songyos Sugmakanan, and was broadcast on satellite channel GMM One and online from May to August 2013. The series was positively received and, despite not being shown on free-to-air terrestrial television and being criticized for its content, proved extremely popular, prompting the creation of a second season. Directed by Kriangkrai Vachiratamporn, the second season began broadcasting in July 2014. In September 2015, Hormones 3: The Final Season began broadcasting. The episodes of the final season were also released in the GTH's official channel with official English subtitles.

== Production ==
First season poster

Hormones is produced by Thai film company GMM Tai Hub (GTH) and its subsidiary production and casting company Nadao Bangkok. According to director Songyos Sugmakanan, Hormones was conceived partly as a channel for GTH to create acting opportunities for its teenage actors and partly as an experiment in creating a drama series that was non-typical for Thai television (which usually features Thai soap operas and sitcoms). With a concept partly based on Songyos's 2008 film of the same name and inspired by the British series Skins, Hormones seeks to explore and portray various aspects and issues of adolescent life. These include topics normally considered taboo for open discussion in Thai society, such as teenage sex and school violence.

In creating the script, Songyos and the writing team conducted online research on contemporary adolescent issues, but also learned from the experiences of the young cast members. He aimed to show the issues from a teenager's point of view and actively avoided any preaching, trying instead to have consequences of actions implied through the characters' experiences. Songyos opted to use the filmmaking techniques that he was familiar with in the creation of Hormones, adjusting them to suit a television production. Filming of the first season took place from December 2012 to April 2013.

Although originally planned for only one season, GTH announced towards the end of the first season that it would be producing a second one, responding to the show's popularity. Songyos switched roles to become producer for the second season, with Kriangkrai Vachiratamporn, who had co-written the series, becoming director. GTH also launched a casting programme with an accompanying reality series titled Hormones: The Next Gen, in order to select additional actors to supplement the original main cast from the first season. Twelve actors were selected as The Next Gen with five of them got supporting roles in the second season.

In 2015, GTH announced the third season of Hormones entitled Hormones 3: The Final Season, which referred the season as the show's final season. With five The Next Gen actors, who were the supporting actors in the second season, were promoted to be the main casts of this season, along with other five from the original The Next Gen final 12, Sky Wongravee who was originally not a part of The Next Gen final 12 but was selected as one of the main cast, and Fon Sananthachat, Belle Kemisara, and Ton Tonhon as the remaining First Gen actors who still had a key role in the show's third season.

== Storyline, cast and characters ==
Hormones features an ensemble cast, with nine main characters in the first season. The story mainly takes place at the fictional Nadao Bangkok College, where the characters attend upper-secondary school. All the main characters are followed throughout the season, with each episode focused on one or a few of the characters and the issues they experience.

The main cast for the first and second seasons, in order of first-season billing, are:

- Pachara Chirathivat (Peach) as Win, the most popular boy at school who is used to getting what he wants
- Ungsumalynn Sirapatsakmetha (Pattie) as Kongkwan, a role-model student seen by her classmates as "the perfect girl"
- Sutatta Udomsilp (Punpun) as Toei, a friendly girl who gets along better with male friends than with other girls
- Chutavuth Pattarakampol (March) as Phu, a bisexual saxophonist in the school concert band and Toei's ex-boyfriend
- Sirachuch Chienthaworn (Michael) as Mhog, an artsy and reclusive boy obsessed with film photography
- Gunn Junhavat as Tar, an ambitious boy with a passion for the guitar and an attraction to Toei
- Sananthachat Thanapatpisal (Fon) as Dao, an innocent dreamy girl with an overprotective mother
- Thanapob Leeratanakajorn (Tor) as Phai, a hot-headed boy who often gets in trouble for violence
- Supassara Thanachat (Kao) as Sprite, a free-spirited, sexually liberated girl

Three supporting actors from the first season also receive main billing in the second:

- Sedthawut Anusit (Tou) as Thee, a school band flutist and Phu's ex-boyfriend
- Napat Chokejindachai (Top) as Pop, the de facto school reporter who knows about all the happenings in the school
- Kemisara Paladesh (Belle) as Koi, Dao's best friend and girlfriend

New characters in Season 2 include:

- Thiti Mahayotaruk (Bank) as Non, a cheerful and friendly boy with a bright personality, who becomes Thee's new best friend. Thee falls in love with him, but he only sees Thee as a "brother."
- Nichaphat Chatchaipholrat (Pearwah) as Kanom-Pang, Tar's girlfriend and Pop's younger sister
- Narikun Ketprapakorn (Frung) as Oil, a girl who is very quiet and reserved. She is Kanom-Pang's best friend, runs a fake Facebook account in Sprite's name.
- Teeradon Supapunpinyo (James) as Sun, a new vocalist of Tar's band, See Scape. He is Kanom-Pang's classmate, and he is a funny and innocent boy with a unique voice.
- Kanyawee Songmuang (Thanaerng) as Jane, a drug-addicted girl. She is Win's new friend from New York.

One supporting actors from the first season and second season also receive main billing in the third:

- Tonhon Tantivejakul (Ton) as Phao, Phu's younger brother and Robot's friend, who aspires to be See Scape's new guitarist.

New characters in Season 3 include:

- Sarit Trilertvichien (Pea) as Boss, a smart and serious boy that wants to make a differences in the school. However, he is not well liked by others.
- Nutchapan Paramacharenroj (Pepo) as First, a hilarious and fun-loving kid who sometimes hang out with Non and Pala.
- Wongravee Nateetorn (Sky) as Pala, a quiet, earnest, simple boy. He lives with his grandmother, who appear to be strict.
- Narupornkamol Chaisang (Praew) as Zomzom, a tough girl who often hangout with her three friends. Her parents are divorced, but she maintains a good relationship with both her parents, and her father's friend, John.
- Atitaya Craig (Claudine) as Mali, the daughter of John. She moved with her father from America to Thailand, and has limited understanding of Thai. She became ZomZom's sister and has a good relationship with her. Mali has a huge crush on Sun.
- Jirayus Khaobaimai (Rolex) as Robot, a close friend and a classmate of Phao. They came from the same elementary school.

Pachara, Ungsumalin, Sutatta and Sirachuch had already played major roles in GTH feature films prior to Hormones, while most of the others had experience in supporting roles in films or mini-series. Sedthawut and Kemisara made their acting debut in Hormones. Five new actors from the Hormones: The Next Gen programme also made their acting debut as supporting characters in the second season.

In Hormones, the main characters (with the exception of Dao and Koi, who are a year younger) are matthayom 5 students (equivalent to grade 11) in the first season, which is set during the 2012 academic year. The second season takes place a year after the first. Supporting characters include teachers, family members, classmates and various others.

== Episodes ==
Each season of Hormones consists of thirteen episodes, with one special each at the beginning and the end. The episodes are as follows.

No.	Episode title	Main character(s) of episode	Original broadcast date
Season 1
0	Special: character introduction	-	18 May 2013
1	"Testosterone"	Win	25 May 2013
2	"Dopamine"	Tar	1 June 2013
3	"Endorphin"	Sprite	8 June 2013
4	"Serotonin"	Mhog	15 June 2013
5	"Estrogen"	Toei	22 June 2013
6	"Dopamine"	Phu	29 June 2013
7	"Adrenaline"	Phai	6 July 2013
8	"Progesterone"	Dao	13 July 2013
9	"Cortisol"	Kwan	20 July 2013
10	"Testosterone vs. Estrogen"	Win & Kwan	27 July 2013
11	"Oxytocin"	All characters	3 August 2013
12	"Growth Hormone"	All characters	10 August 2013
13	"Raging Hormones" (Hormone phung phlak phlak)	All characters	17 August 2013
14	Special: the making of	-	24 August 2013
Season 2
0	Special : Behind The Scene	-	12 July 2014
1	"Ruk Krum Krim"	All characters	19 July 2014
2	"Thee"	Thee	26 July 2014
3	"Toei"	Toei	2 August 2014
4	"Dao+Koi"	Dao & Koi	9 August 2014
5	"Phu"	Phu	16 August 2014
6	"Win"	Win	23 August 2014
7	"Kwan"	Kwan	30 August 2014
8	"Mhog"	Mhog	6 September 2014
9	"Sprite"	Sprite	13 September 2014
10	"Oil"	Oil	20 September 2014
11	"Tar"	Tar	27 September 2014
12	"Phai"	Phai	4 October 2014
13	Finale	All characters	11 October 2014
14	Special	-	18 October 2014
Season 3
0	Special	-	19 September 2015
1	"Growth Hormone"	All characters	26 September 2015
2	"Estrogen"	Dao & Koi	3 October 2015
3	"Adrenaline"	Zomzom & Mali	10 October 2015
4	"Serotonin"	Phao	17 October 2015
5	"Dopamine"	Jane	24 October 2015
6	"Cortisol"	Boss	31 October 2015
7	"Androgen"	Non	7 November 2015
8	"Endorphin"	First	14 November 2015
9	"Testosterone"	Sun	21 November 2015
10	"Growth Hormone II"	Pala	28 November 2015
11	"Oxytocin"	Oil	5 December 2015
12	"Oxytocin II"	Kanompang	12 December 2015
13	"Hormones"	All characters	19 December 2015
14	Special Season Finale – "Unseen Hormones"	–	26 December 2015

== Broadcast and reception ==
The first season of Hormones was broadcast from May to August 2013 on GMM One, a satellite channel owned by GMM Grammy, GTH's parent company. It occupied the 22:00 slot on Saturday nights, and was also available to view online through GMM One's website, and for later episodes, YouTube live streaming. Past episodes were also made available for free viewing on YouTube.

Although the series began with some uncertainty regarding its profitability, it quickly proved extremely popular, despite not being broadcast on free-to-air terrestrial television. Each episode had about a million viewers, and by the eighth episode, the channel's viewership ratings had risen from twentieth to third for the 22:00 Saturday time slot, following only terrestrial channels 3 and 7. While teenagers make up most of the show's viewership, it has also received interest from their parents. And although the show started with only one major sponsor, it had at least ten competing advertisers by the end of the season. The success prompted the production of a second season, which was announced shortly before the end of the first. The show also developed followings in Vietnam, Indonesia and the Philippines. A DVD box set was released in October 2013.

Reception to the series was mostly positive. Hormones was widely mentioned by the press, who attributed its success to its production quality and its offering of new content lacking from usual television programming. However, it also received negative criticism, especially from conservative voices, for its inclusion of inappropriate behaviour. Controversial scenes included students attempting to have sex in a classroom, a female student visit an illegal abortion clinic after losing her virginity and female students fighting in a school toilet. Some members of the National Broadcasting and Telecommunications Commission (NBTC) have suggested that the show featured indecent thoughts and images and, by undermining public morality, might be in violation of the Public Broadcasting Act. A summons by the NBTC for the producers to discuss the show's content sparked further debate about media censorship, while supporters pointed out that some popular soap operas seen by wider audiences featured far worse behaviour. Director Songyos Sugmakanan commented that the series played an integral part in Thailand's culture because the issues this series touches upon like teenage sex, drugs usage and other adolescent problems faced by the Thai's teen were not usually discussed in Thai society. For him, avoiding such subjects basically was an example of "adults closing their eyes" to reality especially to the high abortion rate in Thailand. Ungsumalynn Sirapatsakmetha, who plays Khwan in the series, insisted that the series' aim was to provoke the audience to think and censorship was mainly to protect those who can't think for themselves. Ultimately, the broadcast of the first season was completely uncensored but with pixelization of some objects like cigarette and alcohol containers.

Broadcasting of the show's second season began in July 2014. However, it was switched to another GMM Grammy-owned channel, GTH On Air, which is available only through Grammy's own GMM Z set-top box. Although YouTube live streaming was still offered, the season's past episodes were now only available through the affiliated AIS Movie Store mobile application. Responding to viewer's complaints, GTH later offered a simulcast on GMM Channel, a digital terrestrial channel.

Due to the internet and the new media, Hormones also received tremendous response from audiences outside Thailand like Vietnam, the Philippines, Indonesia and China. In China, Hormones has a huge base of fans that watch the fan-sub version of this series in various video streaming sites.
