= Charlie Trairat =

Thai actor and singer

Charlie Potjes
- ชาลี ไตรรัตน์
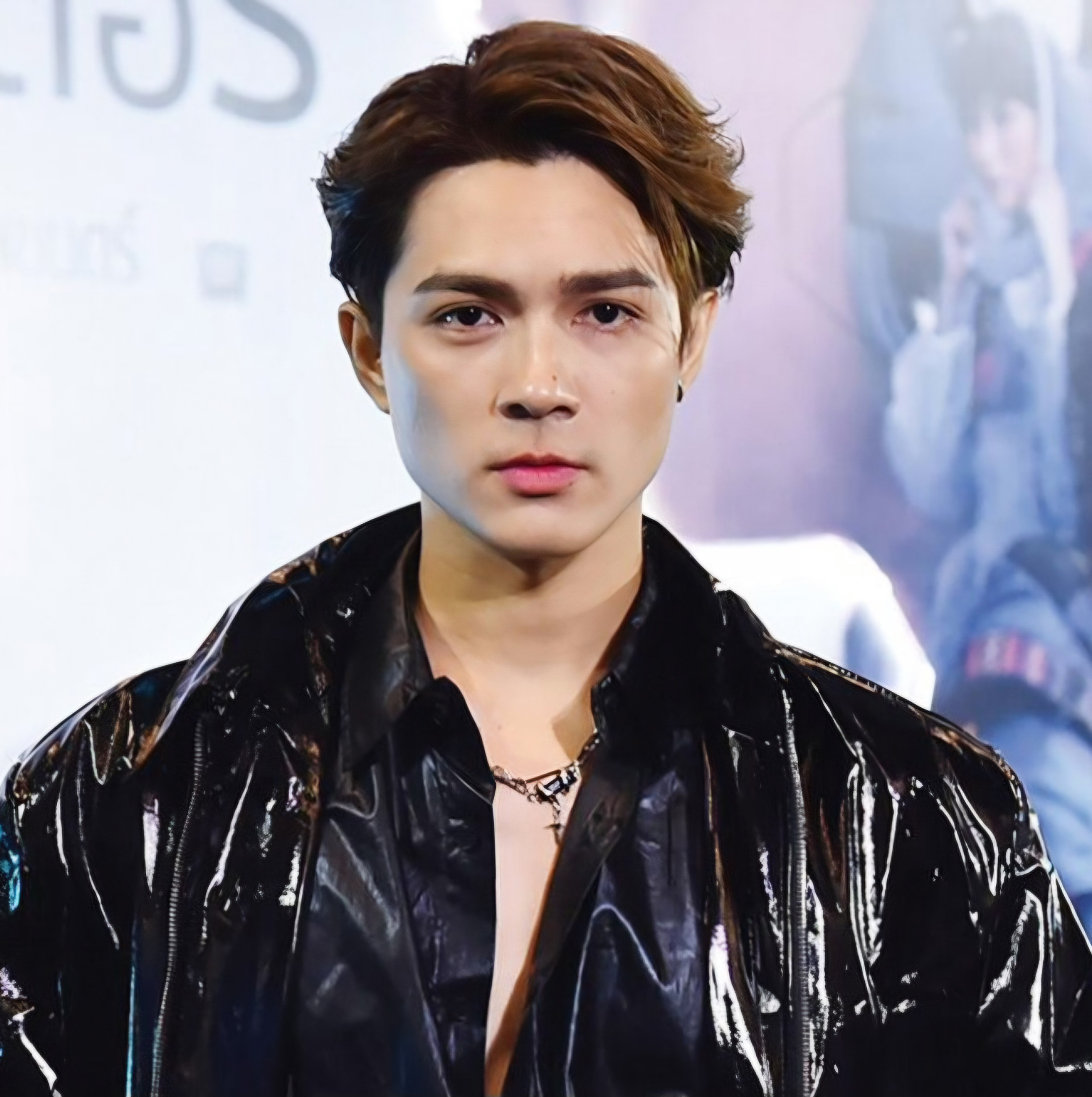
- Born: 19 January 1993 (age 33); Bangkok, Thailand
- Other name: Nack
- Education: Ramkhamhaeng University (drop)
- Occupations: Actor; singer; TV host; voice actor
- Years active: 1995–present
- Height: 1.73 m (5 ft 8 in)

Charlie Trairat Potjes (Thai: ชาลี ไตรรัตน์ ปอทเจส; born 19 January 1993) also known as Nack, is a Thai actor and singer. He gained stardom through Fan Chan, which was Thailand's highest-grossing film in 2003.

== Early life ==
Charlie Trairat Potjes, popularly known by his stage name Nack Charlie, was born on January 19, 1993, in Bangkok, Thailand. He is the youngest of six siblings in a family with a rich cultural heritage, being of Thai and Dutch descent through his father. This multicultural background has played a significant role in shaping his perspectives and artistic expressions. Charlie's early years in Bangkok were marked by a growing interest in the arts and aviation. Despite not completing his university education, he pursued his passion for flying and obtained a Private Pilot License for Very Light Aircraft, which highlights his diverse range of interests beyond acting and music. He first captured the public's attention with his role in "Fan Chan" (My Girl), which became Thailand's highest-grossing film in 2003. This film marked the beginning of his career as an actor and singer, establishing him as a prominent figure in the Thai entertainment industry.

== Career ==
Debut and Early Success

Charlie Potjes, known as Nack Charlie, made an impressive entrance into the film industry before he even turned two years old. His debut came with the 1995 drama "Once Upon a Time" (กาลครั้งหนึ่งเมื่อเช้านี้), directed by the renowned Thai filmmaker Bhandit Rittakol. This early exposure paved the way for his burgeoning career in acting.

Rise to Stardom

Charlie's popularity surged in 2003 with his significant role in "Fan Chan" (My Girl), which topped the Thai box office that year, earning a remarkable 137.3 million baht. This film was not only a commercial success but also received widespread acclaim, establishing Charlie as a prominent figure in Thai cinema.

Continued Film Success

Following the success of "Fan Chan," Charlie starred in "Dek hor" (เด็กหอ), also known as "Dorm" or "My School," a 2006 Thai horror-drama that was well-received both domestically and internationally. The film premiered at the Bangkok International Film Festival and was the number one film in Thailand during its opening weekend, later screening at various international festivals, including the Pusan International Film Festival.

Awards and Recognition

In 2007, Charlie received the Crystal Bear Award at the Berlin Film Festival for "Dek hor," awarded for the best film in the Generation Kplus competition by an 11-member children’s jury. His role in the same film earned him the Golden Doll Award (the Surasawadi Award) for 'Best Actor.'

== Filmography ==
=== Film ===
- Once Upon a Time (Kalla khrung nueng... muea chao nee) (1995)
- Fan Chan (My Girl) (2003)
- The King Maker (2005)
- Dorm (Dek hor) (2006)
- Legend of Sudsakorn (2006)
- Hormones (Pidtermyai huajai wawoon) (2008)
- Phobia 2 (2009)
- Donut โด๋นัท (2011)
- Arbat (2015)
- Buppha Arigato / I Can See Ghost (2016)
- Check In Shock (2020)
- Couples in Trouble (2021)
- Ghost Radio (TBA)

=== Television ===
- Khru Wai Jai Rai on Ch.3 (2005)
- The Gang – Ponlapak Rak Pandin on Ch.5 (2008–2009)
- Puen Sa Tewada Jiew on Ch.7 (2009)
- The Sin Chronicles – Bantuek Karma on Ch.3 (2009–2010)
- Rak Mai Mee Wan Tai on Ch.3 (shooting / 2010) (2011)

=== Hosting ===
- VJ in Kon Doo Pen Yai on Channel V Thailand (2008)

== Discography ==
Singles

- 2018: Sud Tai
- 2018: Kon Lew Lew

== Awards ==
- Surasawadi Awards (Golden Doll Awards) for 'Best Actor' from Dek hor in 2006
- Casting Board talent in 'Star Summit Asia,' Pusan Film Festival 2006
