= Gunn Junhavat =

Thai actor (born 1993)

- กันต์ ชุณหวัตร
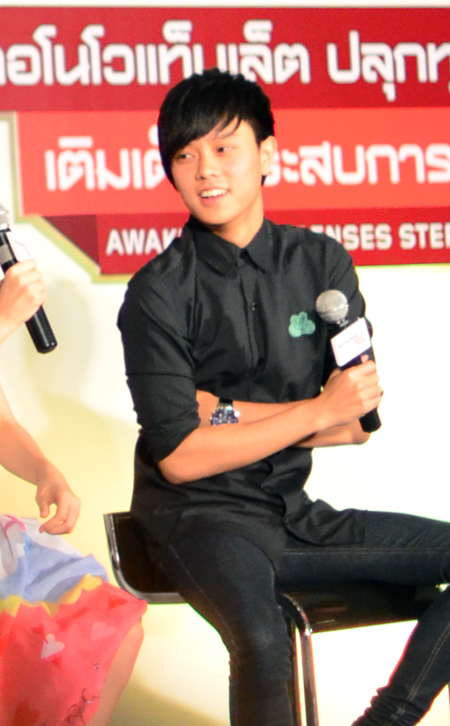
- Gunn in 2013
- Born: Gunn Junhavat; 31 December 1993 (age 32); Bangkok, Thailand
- Education: College of Music, Mahidol University
- Occupations: Actor; host; singer; writer
- Years active: 2007–present
- Agents: GTH (2007–2015); GDH 559 (2016–present)
- Height: 1.62 m (5 ft 4 in)

Gunn Junhavat (Thai: กันต์ ชุณหวัตร; born 31 December 1993) nickname Gunn, is a Thai actor, host and singer. He is best known for his role as Tar in the 2015 GTH's Hormones: The Series.

== Education ==
He attended Srinakharinwirot University Prasarnmit Demonstration School and graduated from College of Music, Mahidol University, majoring in Music Technology (Electric Guitar).

== Filmography ==
=== Film ===
Year	Title	Role	Notes
2006	Dorm		Guest role
2009	Dear Galileo	Angun	Supporting role
2011	SuckSeed	Tem Impact (Vocalist of the band Arena)	Supporting role
2012	Mother		Main role
2012	Band Next Door		Supporting role
2013	SuckSeed GTH Side Stories	Tem Impact	Supporting role
2019	Tootsies and The Fake		Supporting role

=== Television series ===
Year	Title	Role	Channel
2009	Spy The Series	Tom (Ep. 19)	MCOT HD
2013	Hormones: The Series	Tar	One 31
2014	Hormones: The Series Season 2	Tar	GMM 25; GTH On Air
2014	ThirTEEN Terrors	Turk	GMM 25; GTH On Air
2015	Hormones: The Series Season 3	Tar	One 31; GTH On Air
2017	Guiding Light: Smile	Note	MCOT HD
2017	Mitisayong	Jack	GMM 25
2017	Love Songs Love Series 2	Jet	GMM 25
2018	Bang Rak Soi 9/1 Season 2	Joke	One 31
2020	Cat Radio TV	Gun	Channel 3
2020	Quarantine Stories	Tutor (Ep. 9)	GMM 25
2021	#HATETAG	Himself (Ep. 10)	LINE TV
2022	Cat Radio TV Season 2	Gun	Channel 3

=== Host ===
Year	Program	Channel
2010	Hang Over Thailand	Travel Channel Thailand
2013	Play Gang Boys Meet Girls	Play Channel
2015	Hang Over Thailand	One 31
2016	Hang Over Thailand	GMM 25
2016	Love Missions	LINE TV
2017	Game of Teens	GMM 25
2021	Hang Over Thailand: Chiang Dao	YouTube channel: Nadao Bangkok

== Singles ==
Title	Release date	Label
"ขอพร" (Make a Wish)	May 8, 2017	Boxx Music
"ยินดีที่ได้พบ" (Nice To Meet You)	May 24, 2018	Boxx Music
"ถ้าวันหนึ่ง" (If One Day)	August 8, 2019	Boxx Music

== Published works ==
Original title	English title	Publication date	ISBN
Tokyo Unscripted	Tokyo Unscripted	March 2016	978-616-8009055
ฉันออกเดินทางในวันที่ไม่มีแดด	I Leave On a Day Without Sunshine	October 2018	978-616-9317807
ฮอกไกโดสีขาว	White Hokkaido	October 2019	978-616-9317814
I Will Be Back	I Will Be Back	September 2020	978-616-9317821
