= Fan Chan =

2003 Thai film

Fan Chan (My Girl)
- Theatrical release poster
- Directed by: Vitcha Gojiew; Songyos Sugmakanan; Nithiwat Tharathorn; Witthaya Thongyooyong; Anusorn Trisirikasem; Komgrit Triwimol
- Written by: Anusorn Trisirikasem; Aummaraporn Phandintong; Vitcha Gojiew; Nithiwat Tharatorn; Songyos Sugmakanan; Komgrit Triwimol; Witthaya Thongyooyong
- Produced by: Prasert Wiwattananonpong; Yongyoot Thongkongtoon; Jira Maligool
- Starring: Charlie Trairat; Focus Jirakul
- Cinematography: Songyos Sugmakanan
- Edited by: Nithiwat Tharatorn
- Music by: Kongkiat Rueannoi
- Distributed by: Hub Ho Hin; Tai Entertainment; GMM Pictures
- Release date: 3 October 2003
- Running time: 114 minutes
- Country: Thailand
- Language: Thai

Fan Chan (Thai: แฟนฉัน, English: My Girl) is a 2003 Thai coming-of-age romance comedy film directed by Vitcha Gojiew, Songyos Sugmakanan, Nithiwat Tharathorn, Witthaya Thongyooyong, Anusorn Trisirikasem, and Komgrit Triwimol, and starring Charlie Trairat and Focus Jirakul. It was distributed by Hub Ho Hin, Tai Entertainment and GMM Pictures. The film is a nostalgic look back at the childhood friendship of a boy and a girl growing up in a small town in Thailand in the 1980s, featuring a soundtrack of Thai pop music of the era. It was the debut film of six young Thai directors.

== Plot ==
Jeab, a young man working in Bangkok, receives word that his best friend from childhood, Noi-Naa is to be married. While driving back to his hometown, the memories of his friendship with her come flooding back, and their story is told in a flashback.

Jeab and Noi-Naa live in a small city somewhere in Phetchaburi in southern Thailand. Their fathers are rival barbers, whose shops are separated only by a mini-mart. Jeab's father favors efficiency and uses an electric trimmer. Noi-Naa's father, meanwhile, has a more contemplative, artistic approach, and uses scissors. Jeab notes that the results of both methods seem to be the same.

The school holiday has ended. Jeab is notorious for oversleeping, and each day he misses the school bus and must be driven part way by his father on a motorcycle. By taking a shortcut, Jeab and his father are able to catch up to the bus, but only just in time.

On the bus, other boys are introduced. Their ringleader is an overweight bully named Jack. On the bus, the children talk about what they are going to do after school. The boys decide they will play Chinese fantasy characters, while the girls plan to play "house".

Because Jeab must cross a busy street to play with the boys, and he fears getting hit by a car, he stays to play with the girls, which makes him the target of much taunting by Jack and the other boys.

Then, one day, Jack and his friends are playing soccer against a rival neighborhood gang. They are one player short. Jeab happens to be hanging around, and is asked to join the game, proving his abilities.

He earns the trust of Jack's gang, and passes various tests in order to join them. But the one thing he must do is sever his ties with Noi-Naa. Jeab does so, quite literally, by cutting a rubber-band jump rope, which Noi-Naa is skilled at playing with.

From that moment on, Noi-Naa refuses to talk to Jeab. Then, one day, Jeab gets word that Noi-Naa is moving away. And, of course, on the day she is to leave, Jeab oversleeps and misses the chance to say his final goodbye to Noi-Naa. Jeab then gets Jack and his friends to commandeer a delivery motorcycle and pursue Noi-Naa and her family in their moving truck. But the motorcycle breaks down, and the truck rolls out of sight. Jeab is to never see Noi-Naa again ... until her wedding.

== Cast ==
- Charlie Trairat as Jeab
- Focus Jirakul as Noi-Naa
- Charwin Jitsomboon as Jeab (adult)
- Wongsakorn Rassamitat as Jeab's father
- Arnudsara Jantarangsri as Jeab's mother
- Nipawan Taveepornsawan as Noi-Naa's mother
- Prem Tinsulanonda as Himself (on television)
- Aphichan Chaleumchainuwong as Dtee
- Preecha Chanapai as Noi-Naa's father
- Anyarit Pitakkul as Boy
- Yok Teeranitayatarn as Manoj
- Chaleumpol Tikumpornteerawong as Jack
- Thana Vichayasuranan as Prik

== Trivia ==
- Preecha Chanapai (also known as Lek Carabao of the band Carabao), who portrayed Noi-Naa's long-haired, moustachioed father, reprised his role of a barber in Dear Dakanda, a 2005 film directed by one of the six Fan Chan directors, Komgrit Triwimol. Prior in 1984, he made his film debut in Yud Huajai Wai Tee Rak with Arnudsara Jantarangsri, who plays Jeab's mother in this film.
- For Arnudsara Jantarangsri, in this film she also reunited with Wongsakorn Rassamitat after they both performed together in Siam Square, her second film after Yud Huajai Wai Tee Rak in the same year.
- Fan Chan was released in Indonesia in 2006 as First Love, with a soundtrack dubbed in Indonesian and featuring the country's pop music of the era.
- In 2023, a five-part documentary series reflecting on the making of the movie, "Remembering Fan Chan: Dream a Dream Again", was released on Netflix.
