= Teetatch Ratanasritai =

Thai actor (born 1999)

- ธีธัช รัตนศรีทัย
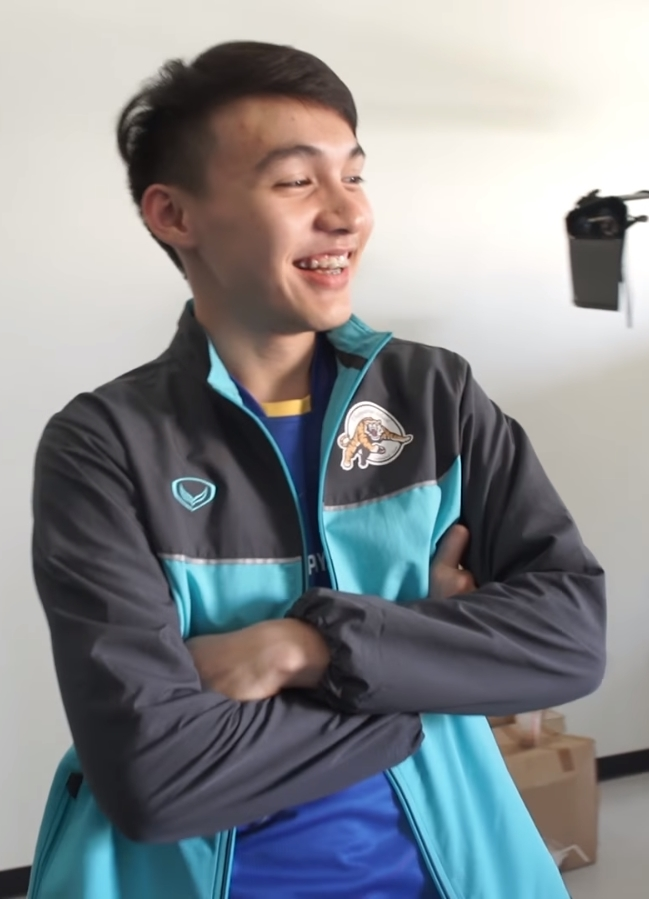
- Teetatch in 2018
- Born: 29 May 1999 (age 27); Thailand
- Other name: Kaopun
- Occupation: Actor
- Height: 1.80 m (5 ft 11 in)

Teetatch Ratanasritai (Thai: ธีธัช รัตนศรีทัย; nicknamed Kaopun; born 29 May 1999) is a Thai singer and actor. As a child, he participated in The Trainer reality singing competition. He attended Sangsom School and the Prasarnmit Demonstration School of Srinakharinwirot University.

== Works ==
=== TV series ===
Year	Title	Role	Channel
2014	Hormones: The Series Season 2	Nat	GMM 25
2014	ThirTEEN Terrors	Ball	GMM 25
2015	Hormones: The Series Season 3	Nat	One 31
2017	Princess Hours Thailand	Kanong	True4U
2017	Project S The Series	Pete	GMM 25

=== Sitcom ===
Year	Title	Role
2016 - 2017	Bangrak Soi 9/1	Top

=== Film ===
Year	Title	Role
2017	School Tales	Net
