= Thiti Mahayotaruk =

Thai actor (born 1996)

- ธิติ มหาโยธารักษ์
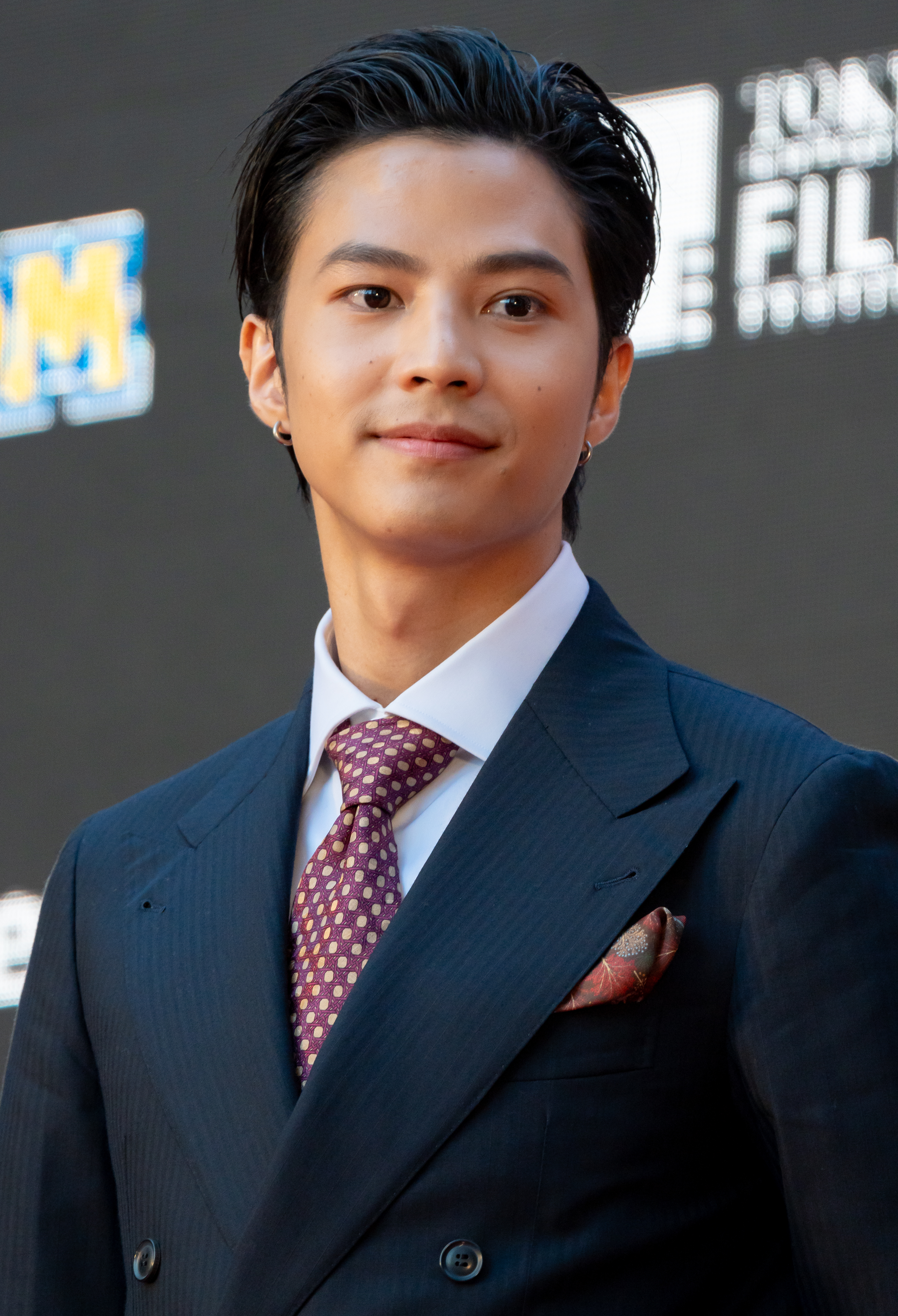
- Thiti in 2023
- Born: November 19, 1996 (age 29); Khon Kaen, Thailand
- Other name: Bank
- Occupation: Actor
- Years active: 2013–present
- Agent: Nadao Bangkok (2014–2022)
- Known for: Non
- Notable work: Hormones: The Series

Thiti Mahayotaruk (Thai: ธิติ มหาโยธารักษ์, born 19 November 1996), nicknamed Bank (Thai: แบงค์) is a Thai actor. He best known for his role as Non in Hormones: The Series.

== Career ==
Thiti Mahayotaruk was born on 19 November 1996 in Khon Kaen, Thailand. He joined a Hormones: The Next Gen audition and placed in the top 12. Later he was placed in the top 5, and made his debut in season 2 of Hormones: The Series. After that he received an offer to play a role in ThirTEEN Terrors. He appeared in episode 4, titled "Missed Call".

In 2015 he was cast for a four-episode LINE short drama series titled Stay The Series. Later he reprised his role as Non in the last season of Hormones: The Series. He also took part in the movie May Who?, where he was paired with Sutatta Udomsilp.

In 2016, he played for another series titled Diary of Tootsies. He also participated in the Love Songs Love Series project.

== Filmography ==
=== Films ===
Year	Title	Role	Notes
2015	May Who?	Pong	Main role
2020	The Con-Heartist	Petch	Main role
2023	Rain Dancer	Chanarong "Vapor" Sathi	Main role
2023	RedLife	Ter	Main role
2025	Gold Rush Gang	Jong Lansaka	Main role
TBA	Esarn Seven		

=== Television series ===
Year	Title	Role	Notes
2014-2015	Hormones: The Series	Natchanon "Non" Kasemchanchai	Season 2 (Recurring) / Season 3 (Main)
2014	ThirTEEN Terrors	Nae	Main role
2015	Stay The Series	Mean	Main role
2016	Diary of Tootsies	Ball	Guest
2016	Love Songs Love Stories: Mai Kang Ying Pae	Aom	Main role
2016	Love Songs Love Series: Kon Mai Jum Pen	Kong	Main role
2017	Love Songs Love Series: How Far is Near	Din	Main role
2017	Project S: SPIKE	Than	Main role
2017	Gata no Kuni kara	Samut	Main role
2018	Muang Maya Live The Series: Game Gon Maya	Tanutam	Main role
2018	Social Syndrome	Pomme	Main role
2019	Fleet Of Time	Win	Main role
2019	My Ambulance	Tai	Supporting
2020	Bpai Hai Teung Duang Dao	Theewin	Main role
2021	Chit Sanghan	Dr. Tattai Thanawat	Main role
2022	My Sassy Princess: The Glass Slippers 2022	Phupha Sirireingpattana (Phu)	Main role
2023	Coin Digger	Bank	Main role

=== Music video appearance ===
- 2014 Ahp Num Raun (อาบน้ำร้อน) Ost.Hormones: The Series 3 - Big Ass (Genierock/YouTube:Genierock)
- 2014 Nung Sue Roon (หนังสือรุ่น) Ost.ThirTEEN Terrors - Cocktail (Genierock/YouTube:Genierock)
- 2015 (ย้อน) Ost.Hormones 3 The Final Season - Slot Machine (/YouTube:GTHchannel)
- 2016 (เพราะ (Just Because)) - Marie Eugenie Le Lay (The Zommarie/YouTube:zommarie)
- 2019 (MCT Compshare : รักติดไซเรน) Ost.My Ambulance - Paris Intarakomalyasut, Nichaphat Chatchaipholrat (Nadao Bangkok/YouTube:Nadao Music)
- 2020 (เจอกันก็พัง ห่างกันก็ร้าย) - Nichaphat Chatchaipholrat (Nadao Bangkok/YouTube:Nadao Music)
- 2021 Sa Tha Na Nhai Nai Sai Ta (สถานะไหนในสายตา) Ost.Jit Sang Harn - Yes'sir Days (Genierock/YouTube:Genierock)
- 2022 Jao Ying (เจ้าหญิง) Ost.My Sassy Princess 2022 - Marie Eugenie Le Lay (One Music (ชื่อเดิม : Exact Music)/YouTube:ช่อง one31) with Earnearn Fatima Dechawaleekul

=== MC ===
Online

- 2022 : ไปไหน.. ไปด้วย! EP.1 On Air YouTube:ThitiThani Channel
- 2023 : Sydney Vlog Ep.1 On Air YouTube:ThitiThani Channel

== Awards and nominations ==
Year	Award	Category	Nominated work	Result
2015	Bioscope Award	Performance of the year	May Who?	Won
