= GMM Tai Hub =

Former film studio of the Thai entertainment conglomerate GMM Grammy

GMM Tai Hub Co. Ltd.
- Final logo used since 2012 before defunct in December 2015
- Type: Subsidiary
- Industry: Motion pictures
- Founded: 2003
- Defunct: 31 December 2015
- Successor: GDH 559
- Headquarters: Bangkok, Thailand
- Key people: Visute Poolvoralaks; Jira Maligool
- Products: Films; TV series
- Parent: GMM Grammy plc
- Subsidiaries: 365 Film; Good Things Happen; Nadao Bangkok
- Website: www.gth.co.th

GMM Tai Hub or GTH (Thai: จีเอ็มเอ็ม ไท หับ or จีทีเอช) was a former film studio of the Thai entertainment conglomerate GMM Grammy. It was formed in 2003 by a merger between GMM Pictures, Tai Entertainment, and Hub Ho Hin Film following the box-office success of the childhood romantic comedy, Fan Chan, which the three companies had produced.

GTH was dissolved on 31 December 2015 due to internal conflicts. It was succeeded by GDH 559.

== Background ==
In 2000, Tai Entertainment joined Hub Ho Hin Bangkok to produce The Iron Ladies, a film that became a domestic box office leader in 2001. In 2003, Tai Entertainment and Hub Ho Hin teamed up with GMM Pictures to produce Fan Chan.

Launched in May 2004, GTH was a fully independent joint venture from three of Thailand's most renowned and innovative media companies: GMM Grammy (held 51%), Tai Entertainment (held 30%), and Hub Ho Hin Bangkok (held 19%). They announced a merger partner and set up a new company under the name "GMM Tai Hub" or "GTH".

=== Partnerships ===
In 2014, GMM Tai Hub partnered with KBank to launch a new line of debit cards, "GTH is Me".

=== Dissolution ===
On 13 November 2015, GMM Tai Hub announced that GTH was to be dissolved on 31 December 2015. They cited internal disputes on the future direction of the firm as the reason for the breakup.

== Filmography ==
This list includes some filmography produced by the predecessor companies GMM Pictures, Tai Entertainment, and Hub Ho Hin Bangkok Co. Ltd. Since 2016, all of these films' distribution rights have been owned by the successor company, GDH 559.

| Year | Title | Release date(s) (Thailand) |
|---|---|---|
| 2001 | The Iron Ladies | January 11, 2001 |
| 2002 | Mekhong Full Moon Party | October 11, 2002 |
| 2002 | Butterfly Man | December 6, 2002 |
| 2003 | My Girl | October 3, 2003 |
| 2003 | Beautiful Boxer | November 3, 2003 |
| 2004 | Tropical Malady | June 25, 2004 |
| 2004 | Shutter | September 9, 2004 |
| 2004 | Pattaya Maniac | October 7, 2004 |
| 2004 | M.A.I.D. | December 23, 2004 |
| 2005 | The Tin Mine | May 17, 2005 |
| 2005 | Oops There's Dad | July 28, 2005 |
| 2005 | Dear Dakanda | October 6, 2005 |
| 2006 | Dek hor (Dorm) | February 2, 2006 |
| 2006 | Metrosexual | July 13, 2006 |
| 2006 | See How They Run | August 3, 2006 |
| 2006 | Seasons Change | August 23, 2006 |
| 2006 | Lucky Loser | October 19, 2006 |
| 2006 | The Possible | December 4, 2006 |
| 2007 | Final Score | February 1, 2007 |
| 2007 | Alone | March 29, 2007 |
| 2007 | Kung Fu Tootsie | July 19, 2007 |
| 2007 | The Bedside Detective | September 6, 2007 |
| 2007 | Body | October 4, 2007 |
| 2008 | Handle Me With Care | February 21, 2008 |
| 2008 | Hormones | March 20, 2008 |
| 2008 | 4bia | April 25, 2008 |
| 2008 | The Last Moment | June 19, 2008 |
| 2008 | Coming Soon | October 30, 2008 |
| 2009 | Best of Times | March 5, 2009 |
| 2009 | Dear Galileo | July 23, 2009 |
| 2009 | Phobia 2 | September 9, 2009 |
| 2009 | Bangkok Traffic Love Story | October 15, 2009 |
| 2010 | Little Comedian | March 11, 2010 |
| 2010 | Hello Stranger | August 19, 2010 |
| 2010 | Cool Gel Attacks | December 2, 2010 |
| 2011 | SuckSeed | March 17, 2011 |
| 2011 | Ladda Land | April 28, 2011 |
| 2011 | The Billionaire | October 20, 2011 |
| 2012 | ATM: Er Rak Error | January 19, 2012 |
| 2012 | Seven Something | July 26, 2012 |
| 2012 | Countdown | December 20, 2012 |
| 2013 | Pee Mak | March 28, 2013 |
| 2014 | Teacher’s Diary | March 20, 2014 |
| 2014 | The Swimmers | August 7, 2014 |
| 2014 | I Fine..Thank You..Love You | December 10, 2014 |
| 2015 | Heart Attack | September 3, 2015 |
| 2015 | May Who? | October 1, 2015 |

== Television ==
=== TV series ===
| Year | Title | Seasons | Original channel |
|---|---|---|---|
| 2008–2014 | True Love Next Door | 4 | Modernine TV (Season 1-2); Channel 5 (Season 3); GTH On Air (Season 4) |
| 2009 | Spy the Series | 1 | Modernine TV |
| 2010–2013 | Opas | 2 | Modernine TV |
| 2013 | GTH Side Story | 1 | GMM One |
| 2013–2014 | ATM 2 | 1 | GMM One |
| 2013–2015 | Hormones The Series | 3 | GMM One (Season 1,3); GMM 25 (Season 2); GTH On Air |
| 2014–2015 | ThirTEEN Terrors | 1 | GTH On Air |
| 2015 | Stay: Saga...Love Always | 1 | Line TV |
| 2015 | Stupid Cupid | 1 | GTH On Air |
| 2015 | Malee: The Series | 1 | GTH On Air |

=== Cable TV and TV channels ===
- GTH On Air
- GMM One
- GMM 25

== See also ==
- GDH 559
