= BUS (band) =

Thai boy band

BUS because of you i shine
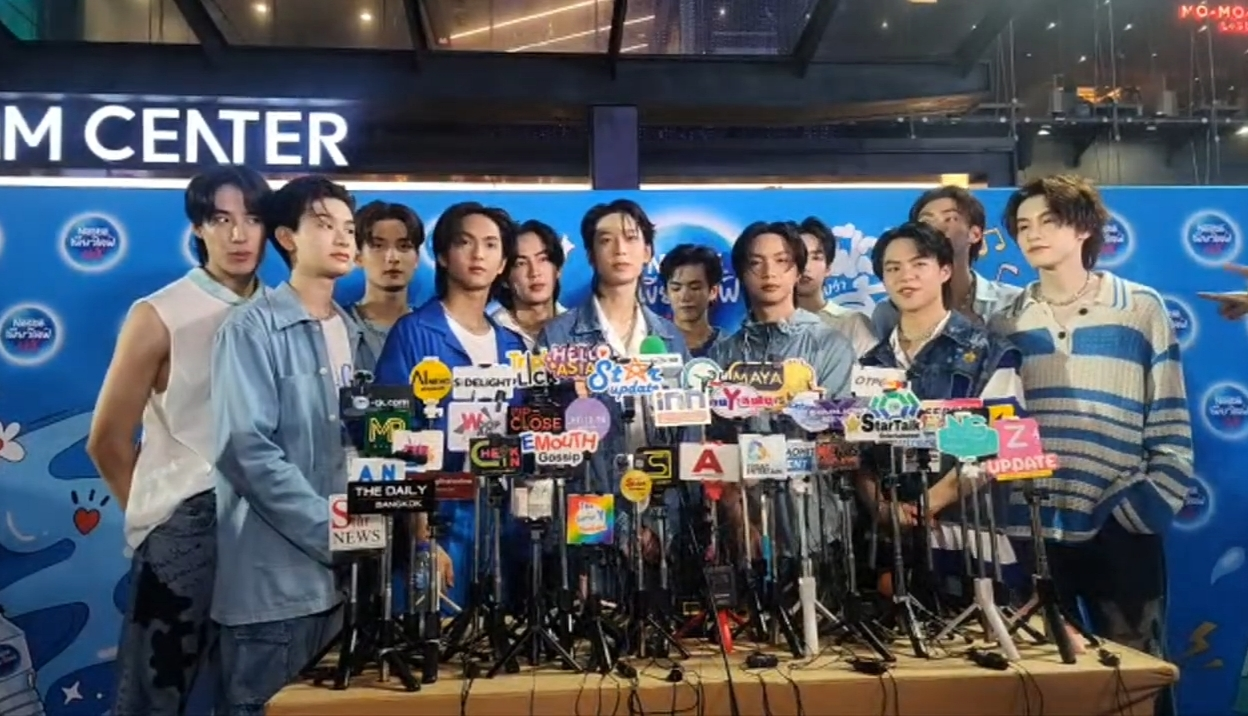
- BUS at Siam Center in 2024

Background information
- Origin: Bangkok, Thailand
- Genres: T-pop; pop
- Years active: 2023–present
- Label: Sonray Music (2023–present) • Universal Music Thailand
- Member of: Tada Entertainment (2023–present)
- Spinoffs: BUS5; BUS7
- Members: Pasawee Sriarunotai (Alan); Kris Kanchanatip (Marckris); Pongpol Panyamit (Khunpol); Chuthiwat Jankane (Heart); Jinwook Kim (Jinwook); Chayanon Phakthin (Thai); Nattakit Chaemdara (Nex); Tatchai Limpanyakul (Phutatchai); Dechawat Pondechaphiphat (Copper); Ashirakorn Suvitayasatian (AA); T Boonsermsuwong (Jungt); Wasupon Pornpananurak (Peemwasu)
- Website: thebeus.com

BUS (stylized in lower case as because of you i shine) is a Thai boy band, and the first group to debut under Sonray Music, a label within Tada Entertainment. The group consists of twelve members, who were selected via participation on the competition reality show 789 Survival. The band's current lineup consists of Alan, Marckris, Khunpol, Heart, Jinwook, Thai, Nex, Phutatchai, Copper, AA, Jungt, and Peemwasu. Fans of the group are known as BEUS, which is short for "Be (with) Us". The band became one of the best-selling Thai boy bands of all time.

== History ==
=== 789 Survival ===
The members of the band were selected as the winners of the Thai reality show 789 Survival, which aired on One 31. Originally, the show intended to form a group of 7, 8, or 9 members, from a total of 24. However, the final winners were chosen through a combination of audience votes, votes from the contestants themselves, and selection by the show's producer, Songyos Sugmakanan. This method resulted in the group having a total of 12 members. Marckris, Copper, and AA were chosen by fan vote. Phutatchai, Khunpol, Heart, Peemwasu, Alan, and Nex were all chosen by the other competitors. Jungt, Thai, and Jinwook were chosen by Sugmakanan.

=== Debut ===
BUS released their debut single, "Because of You, I Shine", on 6 December 2023. The song's music video, which showcases popular tourist attractions across Thailand, was released on the same day.

== Members ==
Name	Nickname	Stage name	Nationality	Position	Birthday	Sub-unit
Pasawee Sriarunotai	Alan	Alan	Thailand	Leader, Rapper	31 July 2002 (age 24)	BUS7
Kris Kanchanatip	Marc	Marckris	Thailand	Main Vocalist	12 December 2002 (age 23)	BUS5
Pongpol Panyamit	Khunpol	Khunpol	Thailand	Lead Dancer, Sub-vocalist	17 March 2003 (age 23)	BUS7
Chuthiwat Jankane	Heart	Heart	Thailand	Main Dancer, Sub-vocalist	8 April 2003 (age 23)	BUS5
Jinwook Kim	Jinwook	Jinwook	South Korea	Rapper	16 July 2004 (age 22)	BUS5
Chayanon Phakthin	Thai	Thai	Thailand, China	Lead Vocalist	26 September 2004 (age 22)	BUS7
Nattakit Chaemdara	Nex	Nex	Thailand	Lead Dancer, Rapper	18 March 2005 (age 21)	BUS7
Tatchai Limpanyakul	Phu	Phutatchai	Thailand	Main Vocalist	10 April 2005 (age 21)	BUS5
Dechawat Pondechaphiphat	Copper	Copper	Thailand	Main Vocalist	18 April 2006 (age 20)	BUS7
Ashirakorn Suvitayasatian	AA	AA	Thailand	Sub-vocalist	22 June 2006 (age 20)	BUS7
T Boonsermsuwong	Jung	Jungt	Thailand	Lead Dancer, Rapper	3 July 2006 (age 20)	BUS5
Wasupon Pornpananurak	Peem	Peemwasu (Note: Peem's Thai stage name is "Peemwasu")	Thailand	Lead Vocalist, Lead Dancer	8 July 2006 (age 20)	BUS7

== Sub-units ==
Unit	Members
BUS5	Marckris, Heart, Jinwook, Phutatchai, Jungt
BUS7	Alan, Khunpol, Thai, Nex, Copper, AA, Peemwasu

== Discography ==
=== 789 Survival ===
Year	Song Title	Members
2023	"Limit Break 24"	789 Trainee
2023	"This Time"	789 Trainee
2023	"Blind Spot"	789 Debut group (BUS)
2023	"Road Trip"	789 Debut group (BUS)
2023	"Forget Me Not"	789 Debut group (BUS)

=== BUS because of you i shine ===
Year	Song	Album	Notes	Ref.
2023	"Because of You, I Shine"	Because of You, I Shine		
2024	"Watch Your Step"	Because of You, I Shine		
2024	"No Matter What"	Because of You, I Shine	BUS5 Unit	
2024	"Brother Zone"	Because of You, I Shine	BUS7 Unit	
2024	"Liar"	Because of You, I Shine		
2024	"Transformer"	Because of You, I Shine		
2024	"Happily Missing You"	Because of You, I Shine		
2025	"Bow Wow"	Because of You, I Shine		
2025	"Boss in the Building"	Hopefully It Leads Somewhere		
2025	"BB"	Hopefully It Leads Somewhere		
2025	"ยังรักอยู่ไหม (Stars.)"	Hopefully It Leads Somewhere		
2026	"So Blue"	Hopefully It Leads Somewhere		
2026	"คับเฮีย (Kub Here)"	Hopefully It Leads Somewhere		
2026	"ดีใจที่ไม่มีเธอ (Happy)"	Hopefully It Leads Somewhere		
2026	"รักมักยาก (Lover Loser)"	Hopefully It Leads Somewhere		
2026	"Chest Voice"	Hopefully It Leads Somewhere		
2026	"K"	Hopefully It Leads Somewhere		

=== Special singles ===
Year	Song	Member(s)	With	Notes
2024	"ฟีลลิ่งแบบว่าอู้วว! (Feeling Bab Wa Ooh!)"	BUS because of you i shine		Special song for Nestle Pure Life endorsement
2024	"เฟี้ยว"	BUS because of you i shine		Bussing Thailand OST
2024	"ภาพเรา (Good Quality Picture)"	BUS because of you i shine		Bussing Thailand OST
2024	"กี่หมื่นครั้งที่ตกหลุมรักคนเดิม"	Marckris		Your Sky OST
2024	"Catch Me"	Jungt	Mindy	
2025	"กั๊ก (No-status Status)"	BUS because of you i shine		Gelboys OST
2025	"Because of You, I Shine (Japanese Version)"	BUS because of you i shine		Special Japanese version
2025	"Rise and Shine"	Peemwasu	T-pop Artists	Olympop theme song
2025	"หายใจทิ้ง (Boys Just Wanna Be Boys)"	BUS because of you i shine		Bussing Japan OST
2025	"หายใจทิ้ง (Boys Just Wanna Be Boys) [Japanese Version]"	BUS because of you i shine		Bussing Japan OST
2025	"Make Your Moment"	BUS because of you i shine		Special song for Oppo endorsement
2025	"เปลี่ยนไปแล้ว (Original by Yokee Playboy)"	JungT	Jung of Perses	F.Hero presents Solid Sound Project
2026	"เพื่อนสนิท (Platonic Love)"	Peemwasu	Three Man Down	
2026	"Take Our Time"	Phutatchai & Jinwook		Duang with You OST
2026	"It Had to Be You"	Copper		Duang with You OST
2026	"Loca"	Nex & AA	Lil League	Collaboration with Japanese Artist
2026	"คน ๆ นี้เป็นของคุณ (Yours)"	Copper	No One Else	
2026	"ถ้าเขาดูแลเธอไม่ดี (To Hold You)"	Thai	Mean Band	
2026	"หยุดน่ารักสักทีเหอะ (Euphoria)"	Jinwook	Fang	
2026	"ปักเมนแฟน (I Stan You)"	Nex	PP Krit, Onglee of Proxie feat. Gelboys	Gelboys 2 OST
2026	"เหตุผลของคำว่ารัก"	Marckris	Wan Thanakrit	

=== Live session ===
Year	Song	Original Artist	Member(s)	Channel	Notes
2021	"โคตรพิเศษ"	Billkin	Khunpol	YouTube: Nadao Bangkok	Tor Billkin PP Khunpol
2023	"เป็นไรมั้ย (Would You Mind?)"	Daou Pittaya	Marckris, Copper	YouTube: One Music	Daou Pittaya x Marc x Copper
2024	"ตกหลุมรักซ้ำๆ (Repeat)"	Mean Band	Peemwasu	YouTube: Mean Band	Mean Band x Peemwasu
2024	"ขอบคุณที่เกิดมาให้รัก"	Mean Band	Peemwasu	YouTube: Mean Band	Mean Band x Peemwasu
2024	"เก่งไม่พอ"	Sarah Salola	Marckris	YouTube: marr team official	Sarah Salola x Marckris BUS
2024	"No Matter What"	BUS5	Marckris	YouTube: BUS because of you i shine	Marckris x Sarah Salola
2024	"No Matter What"	BUS5	BUS5	YouTube: BUS because of you i shine	BUS5 x Mirrr
2024	"กี่เหตุผล (100Reasons)"	Mirrr	BUS5	YouTube: What The Duck	Mirrr x BUS5
2024	"Your Guy"	YourMood	Jungt	YouTube: Whoop Music	YourMood x Jungt BUS
2024	"No Matter What"	BUS5	Jungt	YouTube: BUS because of you i shine	Jungt x YourMood
2024	"แค่น้องชาย (Brother Zone)"	BUS7	BUS7	YouTube: BUS because of you i shine	BUS7 x Billkin PP Krit
2024	""ยอม (Surrender)	Billkin, PP Krit	BUS7	YouTube: Billkin & PP Krit Official	Billkin PP Krit x BUS7
2024	"No Matter What x Brother Zone"	BUS5, BUS7	Alan, Heart	YouTube: KnomJean Kulamas	Knomjean x Alan, Heart (BUS)
2024	"Brother Zone"	BUS7	Copper	YouTube: OTH Entertainment	Jackie x Copper
2024	Medley: "ฉันมันเป็นคนแบบนี้", "R U OK?", "No Matter What", "งอนตลอด"	Boom Saharat, Tigger, BUS5, Ice Paris	Copper	YouTube: One Music	Boom Saharat, Copper, Ice Paris, and Tigger Game Boys Live Session
2024	"11 Months"	Boom Saharat	Copper	YouTube: One Music	Boom Saharat vs Copper Dechawat Game Boys Live Session
2024	"Brother Zone"	BUS7	Copper	YouTube: One Music	Tigger Terio vs Copper Dechawat Game Boys Live Session
2024	"แอบรัก (เพื่อนรัก)"	Kin	Marckris	YouTube: OfficialWhiteMusic	Kin feat. Marckris BUS
2024	"No Matter What"	BUS5	Marckris	YouTube: BUS because of you i shine	Marckris x Kin
2024	"Last Christmas"	Wham!	Alan, Peemwasu	YouTube: MXFRUIT	MXFRUIT x Alan & Peemwasu
2025	"พยายาม"	O-Pavee	Phutatchai	YouTube: BUS because of you i shine	BUS Cover Project
2025	"Happier"	Ed Sheeran	Alan	YouTube: BUS because of you i shine	BUS Cover Project
2025	เธอมากับฝน	Aek Thiti	Heart	YouTube: BUS because of you i shine	BUS Cover Project
2025	"Wicked"	AllDay Project	Jungt	IG, X, Tiktok: Jungwboo	Jung Perses x Jungt BUS
2025	"I Think They Call This Love"	Elliot James Reay	Khunpol	YouTube: BUS because of you i shine	BUS Cover Project
2025	"Heather"	Conan Gray	Jinwook	YouTube: BUS because of you i shine	BUS Cover Project
2025	"I'm Ok // Not Ok"	BoydPod feat. Billkin	Copper, Marckris	YouTube: BUS because of you i shine	Fatcat Number 1 The Orchestra Concert
2025	"Lemon"	Kenshi Yonezu	Nex	YouTube: BUS because of you i shine	BUS Cover Project
2025	"Unfriend"	Helmetheads	Copper	YouTube: BUS because of you i shine	BUS Cover Project
2025	"Dive"	Olivia Dean	Marckris	YouTube: BUS because of you i shine	BUS Cover Project
2025	"สักวันหนึ่ง (Someday)"	Boyd Kosiyabong ft. Marisa	Marckris	YouTube: TorBright Channel	Piano & i Live
2025	"Somewhere Only We Know"	Keane	Marckris	YouTube: TorBright Channel	Piano & i Live
2025	"สิ่งที่สวยงาม (I Wish Every Night)"	Whal & Dolph	Marckris	YouTube: Whattheduck	Whal & Dolph x Marckris BUS
2025	"ยังรักอยู่ไหม (Stars.)"	BUS because of you i shine	Marckris	YouTube: BUS because of you i shine	Whal & Dolph x Marckris BUS
2025	NO WAY	Meyou	Khunpol	YouTube: OfficialWhiteMusic	Meyou x Khunpol
2025	"ยิ่งคบยิ่งไม่รัก (Why?)"	Dice	BUS because of you i shine	YouTube: Tada Labels	BUSDICE
2025	"แค่ไหนแค่นั้น (NO MATTER WHAT)"	BUS5	BUS because of you i shine	YouTube: Tada Labels	BUSDICE
2025	"แค่น้องชาย (brother zone)"	BUS7	BUS because of you i shine	YouTube: Tada Labels	BUSDICE
2025	"อยากแชร์เพลงรักทุกเพลงให้เธอ อยากแชร์เพลงรักให้เธอทุกวัน (y(our) song)"	Dice	BUS because of you i shine	YouTube: Tada Labels	BUSDICE
2026	"9 นาฬิกา"	SPF	Thai	YouTube: BUS because of you i shine	BUS Cover Project
2026	"Blue"	Yung Kai	AA	YouTube: BUS because of you i shine	BUS Cover Project
2026	"Perfect"	Pun feat. 1Mil	Khunpol	YouTube: Pun	Pun feat. Khunpol
2026	"เพลงรักเพลงแรก (Blooming)"	Landokmai	JungT	YouTube: BUS because of you i shine	BUS Cover Project
2026	"คับใจ(อยู่ได้) (Only You)"	Offroad	AA	YouTube: One Music	Offroad x AA
2026	"ส่วนหนึ่งของชีวิต (A Part of Me)"	Guncharlie	Nex	YouTube: Kicks Records	Guncharlie x Nex of BUS
2026	"ดีใจที่ไม่มีเธอ (Happy)"	BUS because of you i shine	Nex	YouTube: Kicks Records	Guncharlie x Nex of BUS
2026	"ยิ้มง่าย (Better Together)"	Fellow Fellow	Phutatchai	YouTube: BUS because of you i shine	BUS Free Zone (แล้วแต่บัส)

=== Dance performances ===
Year	Song	Original Artist	Member(s)	Channel	Notes
2024	"Spot"	Zico feat. Jennie	Jungt	YouTube: One Connection	Charlette x Jungt BUS
2024	"Rookie Lover"	Bamm	Heart, Jungt	YouTube: Bamm	bamm x BUS x Dice
2026	(WE ARE!)	TVXQ	Nex	IG: nay.naranvik, TikTok: perses_official	Nay PERSES x Nex BUS

== Filmography ==
=== TV Series/TV Dramas/Films ===
Year	Title	Type	Role	Member	Channel
2020	Friend Forever	TV series	Pause	Thai	9 MCOT HD, AIS Play
2020	I Told Sunset About You	TV series	Bas	Khunpol	One 31, Line TV
2021	I Promised You the Moon	TV series	Bas	Khunpol	One 31, Line TV
2021	Y-Destiny	Web series	Khao-neow	Thai	AIS Play
2022	Physical Therapy	TV series	Kek-huai	Thai	One 31, AIS Play
2022	My Sassy Princess: Sleeping Beauty	TV drama	Sky	Copper	One 31
2026	Gelboys 2	TV series	Nex & BUS because of you i shine (Cameo)	Nex & BUS because of you i shine	One 31, iQIYI
2026	Inherit	Film		Thai	

=== Music video ===
Year	Song	Artist	Member(s)	Notes
2019	"มีแฟนกันหมดแล้ว"	POP5	Phutatchai	POPIDOL PROJECT
2020	"โคตรพิเศษ"	Billkin	Khunpol	Ost. I Told Sunset About You
2022	"ถ้าเธอไม่ได้คิดอะไร"	Boom Saharat	Khunpol	
2024	"ASAP"	Mobye	Alan	
2024	"Bye Bye"	D-NA	Khunpol	
2024	"Finsta"	Zom Marie feat. Punch 4Eve	Heart, Jinwook	
2024	"Friend to Friend"	PP Krit	Khunpol	
2025	"สักวันฉันจะหายดี"	Ink Waruntorn	Peemwasu	
2025	"No, Thanks"	Ally Jetaime	Jinwook	
	"เพื่อนกี่โมง (friend zone)"	PONCHET	JungT	
2026	"ไม่มีที่ยืน"	Slapkiss	AA	
2026	"RED WINE"	Jetaime	Nex	

=== Variety shows ===
Year	Show	Role	Airtime	Channel	Rerun Channel	Notes:
2023	789 Survival	Contestant	Friday; 9:15 PM; 26 May 2023 – 11 August 2023	One 31	YouTube: 789Survival	
2024	Bussing Thailand	Host	Saturday; 9:45 PM; 15–29 June 2024 Saturday; 9:00 PM; 6 July 2024 – 7 September 2024	One 31	YouTube: BUS because of you i shine	A follow-up to Bussing Thailand, called Bussing Japan, is also available on the group's YouTube channel, but was not broadcast on One 31.
2025	Bussing Japan	Host	Thursday 7:00 PM 7 August 2025 – 6 November 2026	YouTube: BUS because of you i shine		A reality show following BUS's activities around cities in Japan.
2026	BUS TRIP: Singapore	Host	Friday 7:00 PM First Episode: 14 August 2026	YouTube: BUS because of you i shine		A reality show following BUS's activities around cities in Singpore.

== Concerts ==
=== BUS because of You i shine Concerts ===
List of BUS concerts, showing year, concert name, date, and venue
Year	Concert Name	Date	City, Country	Venue
2023	789 Special Stage The Time Capsule	22–24 September 2023	Nonthaburi, Thailand	Thunder Dome
2024	Knock Knock Knock: BUS 1st Thailand Fancon Tour (Khon Kaen)	29 September 2024	Khon Kaen, Thailand	Khon Kaen International Convention and Exhibition Center (KICE) - Hall 1
2024	Knock Knock Knock: BUS 1st Thailand Fancon Tour (Korat)	6 October 2024	Korat, Thailand	Terminal Hall, Terminal 21 Korat Shopping Center
2024	Knock Knock Knock: BUS 1st Thailand Fancon Tour (Hat Yai)	13 October 2024	Hat Yai, Thailand	The 60th Anniversary of His Majesty the King's Accession to the Throne International Convention Center - Convention Hall
2024	Knock Knock Knock: BUS 1st Thailand Fancon Tour (Sriracha)	20 October 2024	Sriracha, Thailand	Sriracha Hall, Central Sriracha Shopping Center
2024	Knock Knock Knock: BUS 1st Thailand Fancon Tour (Chiang Mai)	27 October 2024	Chiang Mai, Thailand	Chiang Mai International Exhibition and Convention Centre - Hall 2-3
2024	Happy BUSDAY The 1st Year Diary Concert	6 December 2024	Bangkok, Thailand	One Bangkok Forum
2025	BUS The 1st Concert Light the World	14–16 March 2025	Nonthaburi, Thailand	Impact Arena
2025	Happy BUSDAY The 2nd Year Diary Concert: The Sophomore	6–7 December 2025	Bangkok, Thailand	Queen Sirikit National Convention Center
2026	BUS The 1st Asia Fancon Tour: The First Light	15 May 2026	Hong Kong	MacPherson Stadium
2026	BUS The 1st Asia Fancon Tour: The First Light	19 May 2026	Kuala Lumpur, Malaysia	Zepp Kuala Lumpur
2026	BUS The 1st Asia Fancon Tour: The First Light	21 May 2026	Jakarta, Indonesia	The Kasablanka Hall
2026	BUS The 1st Asia Fancon Tour: The First Light	24 May 2026	Manila, Philippines	New Frontier Theatre
2026	BUS The 1st Asia Fancon Tour: The First Light	28 May 2026	Taipei	Zepp New Taipei
2026	BUS The 1st Asia Fancon Tour: The First Light	30 May 2026	Tokyo, Japan	Zepp Haneda
2026	BUS The 1st Asia Fancon Tour: The First Light	31 May 2026	Seoul, South Korea	Myunghwa Live Hall
2026	BUS The 1st Asia Fancon Tour: The First Light	5 June 2026	Singapore	The Star Theatre
2026	BUS LIGHT AS ONE Concert	24-26 July 2026	Nonthaburi, Thailand	Impact Arena
2026	Happy BUSDAY The 3rd Anniversary Concert	5-6 December 2026	Bangkok	TBA

=== As Guest appearances ===
Year	Concert Name	Member(s)	Date	Venue
2023	Billkin Tempo Concert Presented by Lazada	BUS because of you i shine	4–5 November 2023	Impact Arena
2024	Billkin & PP Krit Double Trouble Concert Day 1	Marckris, Phutatchai	31 August 2024	Queen Sirikit National Convention Center
2024	Billkin & PP Krit Double Trouble Concert Day 2	Khunpol, Thai	1 September 2024	Queen Sirikit National Convention Center
2024	Gemini Fourth Run the World Concert Day 2	BUS5 (Marckris, Heart, Jinwook, Phutatchai, Jungt)	1 September 2024	Impact Arena
2025	MAMA Presents Nont EP.03 Surui Surai Concert Day 1	BUS because of you i shine	5 September 2025	Impact Arena
2026	PiXXiE Tales Concert: The Enchanted Ceremony	Khunpol	7 February 2026	Impact Arena
2026	Three Man Down Live at Suphachalasai Stadium	Peemwasu	7-8 March 2026	Suphachalasai Stadium
2026	Whal & Dolph Shine Rain Acoustic Concert	Marckris	13 June 2026	centralwOrld PULSE
2026	DUANG GO ROUND Concert Presented by True5G	Phutatchai, Jinwook	15 August 2026	Impact Area
2026	DUANG GO ROUND Concert Presented by True5G	Marckris, Copper	16 August 2026	Impact Area

== Awards and nominations ==
Award nominations for BUS (band)
Year	Award	Category	Nominee(s)	Result	Ref.
2024	Thailand Social Awards 12	Best Creator Performance on Social Media (Boy Band & Girl Group)		Won	
2024	TOTY Music Awards 2023	Best Music of the Year (Male Group)	Because of You, I Shine	Won	
2024	TOTY Music Awards 2023	The Best Performance	Because of You, I Shine	Won	
2024	Kazz Awards 2024	Trending Artist Award		Won	
2024	Kom Chad Luek Award 20th	Best New Artist	Because of You, I Shine	Nominated	
2024	Kom Chad Luek Award 20th	Popular T-pop		Nominated	
2024	Mint Awards 2024	Entertainment Program of the Year	Bussing Thailand	Won	
2024	Mint Awards 2024	Rookie of the Year (Music)		Won	
2024	GQ Men of the Year 2024	Breakout Band of the Year		Won	
2024	Spotify Wrapped Live Thailand 2024	Top Radar Thailand Artist of 2024		Won	
2024	2024 Asia Artist Awards	Best Artist 2024		Won	
2025	Sanook Sud Jud 2024	T-Pop Artist of the Year 2024		Won	
2025	Line Melody Music Awards	Line Melody Best T-Pop 2024		Won	
2025	Thailand Social Award 13th	Best Creator Performance on Social Media (Boy Band)		Won	
2025	The Guitar Mag Awards 2025	New Wave of the Year		Won	
2025	The Guitar Mag Awards 2025	Popular Vote		Nominated	
2025	The Guitar Mag Awards 2025	Best Boy Group of the Year		Nominated	
2025	TOTY Music Awards 2024	New Artist of the Year		Nominated	
2025	TOTY Music Awards 2024	Most Popular Male Group of the Year	"Liar"	Won	
2025	Kazz Awards 2025	Heartthrob of the Year 2024	Marckris	Won	
2025	Kazz Awards 2025	Heartthrob of the Year 2024	Copper	Won	
2025	Kazz Awards 2025	Heartthrob of the Year 2024	AA	Won	
2025	Kazz Awards 2025	Trending Artist Award		Won	
2025	Mint Awards 2025	Best Cover of the Year	Mint Vol.25	Won	
2025	Thailand Influencer Awards 2025	Fans Love Award		Won	
2025	Thailand Influencer Awards 2025	Best T-Pop Influencer Award		Won	
