= Krit Amnuaydechkorn =

Thai actor and singer (born 1999)

- กฤษฏ์ อำนวยเดชกร
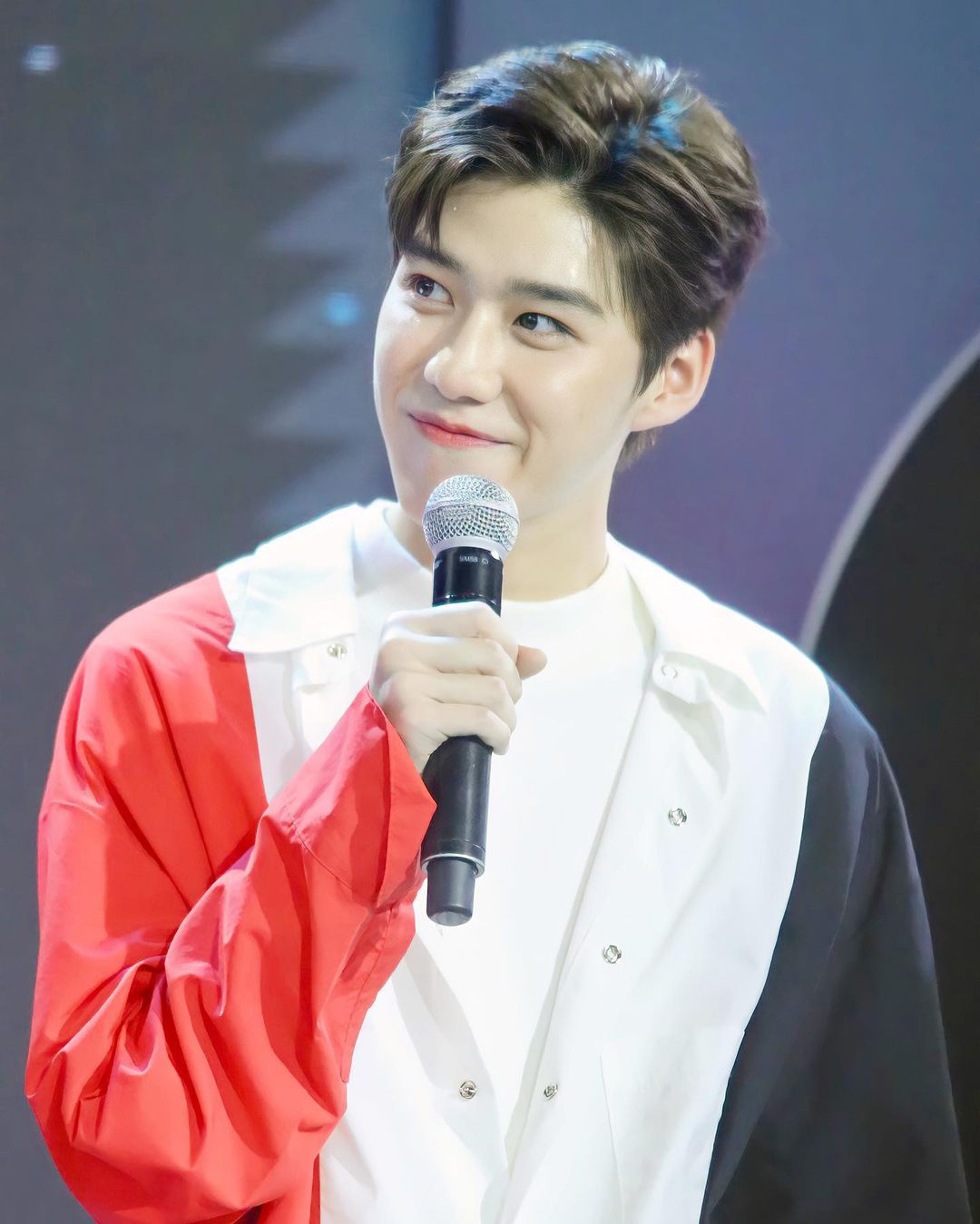
- Krit in November 2020
- Born: 30 April 1999 (age 27); Bangkok, Thailand
- Other names: PP, PP Krit
- Occupations: Actor, Singer, Model
- Years active: 2017–present
- Agent: PP Krit Entertainment
- Known for: Tewkao in My Ambulance; Oh-aew in I Told Sunset About You
- Notable work: I Told Sunset About You, Fire Boy
- Height: 1.78 m (5 ft 10 in)
- Musical career
- Genres: Pop; T-pop
- Labels: Nadao Bangkok (2017–2022); PP Krit Entertainment (2022–present)
- Website: https://www.instagram.com/pp.kritt/

Krit Amnuaydechkorn (Thai: กฤษฏ์ อำนวยเดชกร; born 30 April 1999), nicknamed PP (Thai: พีพี) or PP Krit, is a Thai actor, model and singer. He is known for his roles as Tewkao in My Ambulance (2019) and as Oh-aew in I Told Sunset About You (2020) and I Promised You the Moon (2021). Alongside his acting career, PP Krit is also well known for his music career as a singer; his most notable song is Fire Boy (2022). In 2023, Krit became the first brand ambassador of Balenciaga from Thailand.

== Early life and education ==
Krit was born in Bangkok, Thailand on April 30, 1999. At first, he was named Pruk (พฤกษ์), but only 2–3 weeks later, his parents felt that it was outdated, and decided to change it to PP. He studied at Assumption College from primary to secondary. In Grade 11, he got an opportunity to spend a year in the states as an exchange student. Krit received his high school diploma in 2017. In 2022, he graduated with a degree in entrepreneurial economics at the Faculty of Economics at Kasetsart University.

== Career ==
=== Beginnings (2017–2019) ===
Krit's career in the entertainment industry began when he was scouted by Gong Hive Salon, a famous hair stylist, during his 12th Grade and Gong introduced him to Nadao Bangkok. He got his first opportunity to be a main cast in "MSN" music video, which is a famous single from Helmetheads band. In the same year, he was also cast as a catwalk model in "Boys of Bangkok 2017" at the Emquartier. In 2018, he had his first opportunity to work in the acting field in i Stories (2018) "G" Episode", which is a project of four LGBT-themed short stories.

In 2019, PP Krit, as a Nadao Bangkok artist, had the opportunity to play a supporting role in My Ambulance. This series became a starting point for him to influence the public.

=== Breakthrough (2020–2022) ===
==== Acting career ====
He rose to popularity with his role as Tewkao in My Ambulance (2019) where he was paired with Putthipong Assaratanakul (Billkin), who played the role of Doctor Tao.

With the conclusion of the said television series in October 2019, plans were made to produce a boys' love television series where Putthipong and Krit will play as lead actors. The project, with a working title of "BKPP: The Series", was announced in February 2020 and was supposed to premiere in July 2020. Due to government restrictions placed amidst the COVID-19 pandemic, the series' production was delayed with its release pushed to October 2020 under the title of I Told Sunset About You. Krit played the role of Oh-aew, a high-school student from Phuket and a childhood friend and eventually lover of Putthipong's character Teh. The series returned for a second season in May 2021 entitled I Promised You the Moon.

==== Music career ====
PP Krit had never experienced singing or music before, but Nadao Bangkok recognized his potential. He had the chance to perform live with Billkin at the LINE TV AWARDS 2020, singing a song called "HIDDEN TRACK." The show was a success and proved that Krit had singing potential.

In the series I Told Sunset About You, PP Krit had the opportunity to sing the Original Sound Track for season one, with two songs: "หรูเหอ 如何 (Skyline)" and "โคตรพิเศษ (Khot Phiset)." For season two, he sang "รู้งี้เป็นแฟนกันตั้งนานแล้ว (Safe Zone)" with Billkin, along with "ห่มผ้า (Hold Me Tight)," "หลอกกันทั้งนั้น (Fake News)," "ทะเลสีดำ (Ta Lay See Dum)" with Billkin, and "ไม่ปล่อยมือ (Coming of Age)" with Billkin.

Krit officially debuted as a singer under Nadao Bangkok's music label Nadao Music, with the release of his debut single "It's Okay Not To Be Alright" in August 2021. He later released another single "I'll Do It How You Like It" in February 2022.

=== Continued exposure and PP Krit Entertainment (2022–present) ===
In 2022, PP Krit started his own company, 'PP Krit Entertainment', and continued to focus on entertainment, including acting and music. He launched a new song called "Fire Boy", (2022) which went viral and became a successful track for his new venture. Following its success, he continued to release new songs such as "Hesitate (ลังเล)" (2023) and "Rerun (เส้นเรื่องเดิม)" (2023). For the latter, he also launched 'Rerun-short film' as promotion for the song, acting with Naphat Siangsomboon.

Due to the success of his acting and singing careers, PP Krit decided to host his first fan meeting, titled "LIT & GLITTER PP KRIT: THE FIRST FAN MEETING." Tickets sold out rapidly, prompting the company to schedule an additional round of fan meetings. The fan meetings took place on March 4 and 5, 2023, at the Royal Paragon Hall.

While focusing on solo work, PP Krit continued to collaborate with Billkin on joint projects as a way to reciprocate the love from their fans. They initiated the 'BKPP Asia Fanmeeting' tour, covering many cities across Asia.

PP Krit also performed at music festivals such as Summer Sonic 2022, where he shared the stage with Billkin under the name "Billkin & PP Krit" on the Pacific Stage. Following this, he continued to receive invitations to join music festivals in various countries, including the SONG SHAN MUSIC FESTIVAL and W-POP Music Festival in China, as well as the 555 Thai Music Festival in Singapore.

On July 31, 2023, PP Krit became the First Brand Ambassador of Balenciaga, announcing him alongside Isabelle Huppert.

PP Krit appeared in Troye Sivan's "Got Me Started" music video, which premiered on September 20, 2023. Additionally, he appeared in the final walk of Miss Universe Thailand 2023.

In early March 2024, PP Krit released a new single "Ooh! (เสนอตัว)".

==== Collaborative project with Billkin ====
In July 2024, PP Krit and Billkin announced a new joint project, starting with their duet titled "Surrender (ยอม)" under the collaborative YouTube channel "Billkin & PP Krit Official".

They also held the couple concert "Billkin & PP Krit Double Trouble Concert" at QSNCC, Bangkok, Thailand, on August 31 and September 1, 2024. With over 40,000 attendees, the two-night performance was completely sold out, marking their largest couple concert to date and the biggest ever hosted at the venue since its renovation.

In addition, they co-starred in a GDH movie titled The Red Envelope, released in March 2025.

== Filmography ==
=== Films ===
List of films, showing year, title, role, notes, and references
Year	Title	Role	Notes	Ref.
2025	The Red Envelope	Titi	Thai-language remake of Marry My Dead Body (2022)	

=== Television series ===
List of television series, showing year, title, role, notes, and references
Year	Title	Role	Notes	Ref.
2018	i STORIES	Pete	Episode: "G"	
2019	My Ambulance	Tewkao	Supporting role	
2020	I Told Sunset About You	Oh-aew	Main role	
2021	I Promised You the Moon	Oh-aew	Main role	

=== Short films ===
List of short films, showing year, title, role, notes, and references
Year	Title	Role	Notes	Ref.
2021	Don't Be Sulking, Buddy (อย่างอนดิเพื่อน กูไม่อยากเสียฟอร์มง้อ)	Pastry Chef	NADAOxOPPO	
2021	Last Twilight in Phuket	Oh-aew	I Promised You the Moon side story	
2021	Shining in my Eyes	Fashion Student	NADAOxOPPOChina	
2022	DOUBLE ME	PP	Promotional film for OPPO Reno7 Series 5G	
2023	The (Un)important Part (ส่วน(ไม่)สำคัญ)	Sales Representative	Promotional film for OPPO Reno8 T 5G	
2023	Lay's Exclusive Romantic Comedy Short Film by PP	PP	Lay’s Theatre of Joy	
2023	Rerun (เส้นเรื่องเดิม)	Kit	Promotional film for the song "Rerun"	

=== Television shows ===
List of television shows, showing year, title, role, network or notes, and references
Year	Title	Role	Network / Notes	Ref.
2020	BillkinPP Closer Than Ever	Host / Cast member	AIS PLAY VR; AIS VR originals; 6 episodes	
2022	Lay's ON CRUISE	Host / Cast member	GMMTV (YouTube); Short variety web series; 3 episodes	

=== Music video appearances ===
List of MV appearances, showing year, title, artist, role or notes, and references
Year	Title	Artist	Role / Notes	Ref.
2017	"MSN"	Helmetheads	Male lead; Debut appearance	
2019	"Chan Yuen Yu Trong Ni" (Thai: ฉันยืนอยู่ตรงนี้, lit. 'I am standing right here')	LingRom	Male lead	
2019	"My Ambulance" (รักติดไซเรน)	Ice Paris, Pearwah	Cameo	
2020	"Skyline" (กีดกัน)	Billkin	Series OST; co-star	
2020	"Untold Answer" (แปลไม่ออก)	Billkin	Series OST; co-star	
2020	"Freaking special" (โคตรพิเศษ)	Billkin	Series OST; co-star	
2022	"Thao Rai Ko Mai Pho" (Thai: เท่าไหร่ก็ไม่พอ, lit. 'Never enough')	Bell Supol	Co-starred with Billkin	
2023	"Got Me Started"	Troye Sivan	Special guest cameo; Exclusively featured in the Global/Asian cut	

== Discography ==
=== Extended play ===
Title	Details	Track List
Undress	Released: October 22, 2024; Label: PP Krit Entertainment; Formats: Zoetrope & Picture Disc Vinyl, CD, digital download, streaming	1. Ooh!; 2. FIRE BOY; 3. RERUN; 4. Hesitate; 5. friend to friend 6. FIRE BOY (SpatChies Remix)

=== Singles ===
==== As lead artist ====
Year	Title	Album	Note	Ref.
2021	"It's Okay Not To Be Alright"	Non-album singles	Released under Nadao Music.	
2022	"I'll Do It How You Like It"	Non-album singles	Released under Nadao Music.	
2022	"FIRE BOY"	Undress	Official SpatChies remix version in 2023.	
2023	"Hesitate" (ลังเล)	Undress	—	
2023	"RERUN" (เส้นเรื่องเดิม)	Undress	—	
2024	"Ooh!" (เสนอตัว)	Undress	—	
2024	"friend to friend" (ขอโทษละกัน)	Undress	No More Friends version with PUN in 2024; Mandarin version, Chinese: 就范; pinyin: Jiùfàn, in 2026	
2024	"Surrender" (ยอม) with Billkin	Non-album singles	—	
2025	"Oopsy Daisy"	Non-album singles	—	
2025	"What's going on"	Non-album singles	—	
2026	"guilty pleasure" feat. GALCHANIE	Non-album singles	—	
2026	"GOOD (not) ENOUGH" (เก่งไม่พอ)	Non-album singles	—	
2026	"Your Candy"	Non-album singles	—	

==== As featured artist ====
Year	Title	Main Artist	Album	Ref.
2026	"My Fault" (คนขี้น้อยใจ)	Cake SERIOUS BACON	Non-album singles	

=== Soundtrack appearances ===
Year	Title	Album	Ref.
2020	"Skyline" (Chinese: 如何; pinyin: rúhé)	OST I Told Sunset About You	
2020	"Freaking Special" (โคตรพิเศษ)	OST I Told Sunset About You	
2021	"Safe Zone" (รู้งี้เป็นแฟนกันตั้งนานแล้ว) with Billkin	OST I Promised You the Moon	
2021	"Hold Me Tight" (ห่มผ้า)	OST I Promised You the Moon	
2021	"Fake News" (หลอกกันทั้งนั้น)	OST I Promised You the Moon	
2021	"Ta Lay See Dum" (ทะเลสีดำ) with Billkin	OST I Promised You the Moon	
2021	"Coming of Age" (ไม่ปล่อยมือ) with Billkin	OST I Promised You the Moon	
2025	"Wake Up Call" (ตื่น) feat. MILLI	OST The Red Envelope	
2025	"GFF Ghost Friend Forever" (สัมภเวซี้) with Billkin	OST The Red Envelope	
2025	"Ruined" (ใจหล่น)	OST The Red Envelope	
2026	"I STAN YOU" (ปักเมนแฟน) with NEX OF BUS, ONGLEE PROXIE	OST GELBOYS 2	

=== Collaborations ===
Collaborations and special projects
Year	Title	Collaborated artist(s)	Note	Ref.
2021	"Man Dee Loei" (มันดีเลย)	Peck Palitchoke, Pearwah, Billkin	Special single for Lays Thailand	
2021	"Tha Thoe Rak Chan Ching" (ถ้าเธอรักฉันจริง)	—N/a	GeneLab+ Nadao Music | Cross Cover with Three Man Down #GeneLabPLUSNadaoMusic	
2021	"Let's Celebrate" (เพื่อนกัน)	Ice Paris, Billkin, Nana	亚运好声音 Musical Asian Games	
2021	"Hold Me Tight" (ห่มผ้า)	N/A	#CTWMusicHeals2021	
2021	"Coming of Age" (ไม่ปล่อยมือ)	Billkin	#CTWMusicHeals2021	
2021	"STAY"	Ice Paris, Oab, Bank	#LINETVFINFOREVER x NADAO BANGKOK; cover of Getsunova	
2022	"Hoo Whee Hoo" (แลกเลยปะ)	Billkin, 4EVE	Special single for Lays Thailand	
2022	"I'll Do It How You Like It"	TAEW	#TAEWxPPKritLiveSession NadaoMusic x Ch3Thailand	
2022	"100%"	TAEW	#TAEWxPPKritLiveSession NadaoMusic x Ch3Thailand	

== Videography ==
=== Music videos ===
Year	Title	Director(s)	Cast / Co-star(s)	Ref.
2020	"Skyline"	—	—	
2020	"Freaking Special"	New - Watjakorn Hankoon	Billkin	
2021	"Safe Zone"	Yong - Songyos Sugmakanan	Billkin	
2021	"Hold Me Tight"	Patipol Teekayuwat	Billkin	
2021	"Fake News"	Yong - Songyos Sugmakanan	Billkin	
2021	"It's Okay Not To Be Alright"	Boss - Naruebet Kuno	Bright Rapheephong	
2022	"I'll Do It How You Like It"	Boss - Naruebet Kuno	Alek Teeradetch	

== Concerts and live performances ==
=== Headlining concerts ===
Date(s)	Concert	Venue	City	Country	Ref.
Mar 04 - 05, 2023	PP KRIT THE FIRST FAN MEETING LIT & GLITTER	Royal Paragon Hall	Bangkok	Thailand	
Aug 31 – Sep 01, 2024	Billkin & PP Krit DOUBLE TROUBLE CONCERT	Hall 1 - 4 Queen Sirikit National Convention Center	Bangkok	Thailand	
Mar 08 - 09, 2025	PP Krit My Pleasure Concert	IMPACT Arena	Nonthaburi	Thailand	
Jun 13 – 15, 2025	Billkin & PP Krit - The Red Envelope Wedding Concert	Hall 1 - 2 Queen Sirikit National Convention Center	Bangkok	Thailand	
Nov, 29 - 30, 2025	PP Krit "My Pleasure Concert: AFTERGLOW"	The Venetian Arena	Macau	China	

=== Co-headlining concerts ===
Date(s)	Concert	Co-headliner(s)	Venue	City	Country	Ref.
May 31 - Jun 01, 2025	HER VERSE & HIS VOICE CONCERT Written by AMP ACHARIYA	Billkin, F.Hero, NONT TANONT, NuNew, POP PONGKOOL and URBOYTJ	BITEC Live	Bangkok	Thailand	
Jun 20 - 21 2026	THE TITANS CONCERT	BamBam, Jeff Satur and Timethai	Hall 1 - 3 Queen Sirikit National Convention Center	Bangkok	Thailand	

=== Supporting acts ===
Date(s)	Concert	Main Artist(s)	Role	Venue	City	Country	Ref.
Oct 11, 2025	MARIAH CAREY The Celebration of Mimi Live in Bangkok	Mariah Carey	Opening act	IMPACT Challenger Hall 2	Bangkok	Thailand	

=== Music festivals ===
Date(s)	Festival	Venue	City	Country	Ref.
Nov 21 - 22, 2020	FANTOPIA 2020 (Note: Joint performance by PP Krit and Billkin)	IMPACT Arena	Nonthaburi	Thailand	
Aug 20, 2022	Summer Sonic 2022	Pacific Stage Makuhari Messe	Chiba	Japan	
Aug 24, 2022	Summer Sonic Extra 2022	Ebisu Garden Hall	Tokyo	Japan	
Oct 15, 2022	안녕 BANGKOK ARENA-K 2022 (Note: Joint concert)	IMPACT Challenger Hall 1	Nonthaburi	Thailand	
Oct 29, 2022	T-POP Concert Fest 1	Stage 1 Queen Sirikit National Convention Center	Bangkok	Thailand	
Dec 10, 2022	12th Big Mountain Music Festival (BMMF12)	BLOCK STAGE The Ocean Khao Yai	Nakhon Ratchasima	Thailand	
Jun 23, 2023	SONG SHAN MUSIC FESTIVAL (Chinese: 嵩山音乐节)	Dengfeng Sports Center	Zhengzhou	China	
Jul 21, 2023	BUBBLING & BOILING Music and Arts Festival (Chinese: 泡泡岛音乐与艺术节)	Dongjiangwan Scenic Area	Tianjin	China	
Oct 14, 2023	T-POP Concert Fest 2	Stage 1 Queen Sirikit National Convention Center	Bangkok	Thailand	
Dec 09, 2023	13th Big Mountain Music Festival (BMMF13)	BLOCK STAGE The Ocean Khao Yai	Nakhon Ratchasima	Thailand	
Dec 17, 2023	W-POP Music Festival	Nanning Wu Xiang Bonded Area	Nanning	China	
Jan 03, 2024	555 Thai Music Festival	Resorts World Sentosa, Convention Centre	Singapore	Singapore	
May 5, 2024	Fansland Music Festival 2024 in Bangkok	IMPACT Exhibition Hall 5–8	Bangkok	Thailand	
Oct 13, 2024	T-POP (MART) CONCERT FEST 3	Stage 2 Queen Sirikit National Convention Center	Bangkok	Thailand	
Dec 28, 2024	Yuewen Music Festival	Siloso Beach, Sentosa	Singapore	Singapore	
Apr 13, 2025	X Festival 2025	Warehouse Stadium, Rama4	Bangkok	Thailand	
Oct 12, 2025	NOW FEST 2025 (Bangkok)	Stage 1 BITEC Bangna	Bangkok	Thailand	

=== Guest appearances ===
Date(s)	Concert	Host artist(s)	Venue	City	Country	Ref.
Sep 11, 2022	STAMP Duay Rak Lae Aep Di Concert	Stamp Apiwat	IMPACT Arena	Nonthaburi	Thailand	
Sep 17 - 18, 2022	4 Yak Pak Wan: I Will Survive	Wan Thanakrit, Pop Pongkool, Oat Pramote, Aof Pongsak	Royal Paragon Hall	Bangkok	Thailand	
Sep 30 – Oct 01, 2023	NONT EP.02 SO SERIOUS จริงๆจังๆ CONCERT	Nont Tanont	IMPACT Arena	Nonthaburi	Thailand	
Oct 07, 2023	The 4 Queens Concert	Ink Waruntorn, Bowkylion, Violette Wautier, Zom Marie	IMPACT Challenger Hall 1	Nonthaburi	Thailand	
Nov 4 – 5, 2023	Billkin Tempo Concert	Billkin	IMPACT Arena	Nonthaburi	Thailand	
Aug 2 – 3, 2025	Ink Waruntorn '10th Anniversary' Concert	Ink Waruntorn	IMPACT Arena	Nonthaburi	Thailand	
Jul 19, 2026	TEN : CORE0110 - 10th Anniversary Concert	TEN	BITEC Live	Bangkok	Thailand	

=== Fan meetings and events ===
Date(s)	Event	Venue	City	Country	Ref.
Mar 26, 2022	'I Told Sunset About You The Last Twilight' Music in the park	CU Centenary Park	Bangkok	Thailand	
Jun 04, 2023	BILLKIN & PP KRIT ASIA FAN MEETING 2023 IN TAIPEI	Taipei International Convention Center	Taipei	Taiwan	
Jun 06 - 07, 2023	BILLKIN & PP KRIT ASIA FAN MEETING 2023 IN HONG KONG	Star Hall, KITEC	Hong Kong	China	
Sep 04, 2023	BILLKIN & PP KRIT ASIA FAN MEETING 2023 IN TOKYO	Tachikawa Stage Garden	Tokyo	Japan	
Sep 06, 2023	BILLKIN & PP KRIT ASIA FAN MEETING 2023 IN OSAKA	Grand Cube Osaka	Osaka	Japan	
Sep 08, 2023	BILLKIN & PP KRIT ASIA FAN MEETING 2023 IN SEOUL	KBS Arena	Seoul	South Korea	
Sep 10, 2023	BILLKIN & PP KRIT ASIA FAN MEETING 2023 IN MANILA	World Trade Center Hall A	Manila	Philippines	
Jan 27 - 28, 2024	BILLKIN & PP KRIT ASIA FAN MEETING 2024 IN MACAU	MGM COTAI 1/F Roof Terrace	Macau	China	
Jan 31, 2026	PP KRIT THE TIME WE SLOW DOWN FANSIGN	Undisclosed	Shanghai	China	
Feb 01, 2026	PP KRIT THE TIME WE SLOW DOWN FANSIGN	Undisclosed	Guangzhou	China	
Feb 08, 2026	PP KRIT THE TIME WE SLOW DOWN FANSIGN	Undisclosed	Chongqing	China	

== Publications ==
=== Photobooks ===
- The Official Photobook: I Told Sunset About You / I Promised You The Moon (2021)
- About Sunset to The Moon (2022), a photobook included in the I Told Sunset About You album boxset.
- PP Krit x L'Officiel Photobook (2022), a limited-edition photobook included in Kirinatu's "PP Krit Exclusive Collaboration Set", featuring photographs from his first attendance at Paris Fashion Week in 2022.
- PP Krit RERUN Photobook (2024), a photobook featuring exclusive photographs and behind-the-scenes moments from the short film and music video for "RERUN".
- UNDRESS Exclusive Photobook (2024), an exclusive photobook included in the UNDRESS mini album boxset.
- PP Krit MY PLEASURE Photobook (2025), a commemorative photobook for PP Krit My Pleasure Concert, his first solo concert.

== Accolades ==
=== Awards and nominations ===
Year	Award	Category	Nominated work	Result	Refs.
2020	The 5th Weibo TV Series Awards	Most Popular Foreign Actor	I Told Sunset About You	Won	
2021	Yniverse Awards 2020	Best Actor	I Told Sunset About You	Won	
2021	17th Komchadluek Awards	Popular Actor	I Told Sunset About You	Won	
2021	2021 Line TV Awards	Best Viral Scene	I Told Sunset About You (The "trying on mother's bra" scene)	Won	
2021	2021 Line TV Awards	Best Kiss Scene (shared with Putthipong Assaratanakul)	I Told Sunset About You	Won	
2021	2021 Line TV Awards	Best Couple (shared with Putthipong Assaratanakul)	I Told Sunset About You	Won	
2021	12th Nataraja Awards	Best Actor for Online Drama Series	I Told Sunset About You	Nominated	
2021	1st Siam Series Awards	Popular TV Series Couple (shared with Putthipong Assaratanakul)	I Told Sunset About You	Won	
2021	1st Siam Series Awards	Best Scene (shared with Putthipong Assaratanakul)	I Told Sunset About You (The "underwater" scene)	Won	
2021	Seoul International Drama Awards 2021	Asian Star Prize	I Told Sunset About You	Won	
2021	Kazz Awards 2021	Male Teenage of the year	—	Won	
2021	Kazz Awards 2021	Best Scene (shared with Putthipong Assaratanakul)	I Told Sunset About You	Nominated	
2021	3rd Zoomdara Awards	Popular single	It's okay not to be alright	Nominated	
2021	3rd Zoomdara Awards	Solo Artist of the year		Nominated	
2021	3rd Zoomdara Awards	Popular Couple (shared with Putthipong Assaratanakul)	"แปลรักฉันด้วยใจเธอ" (I Told Sunset About You)	Nominated	
2021	7th Maya Awards	Charming boy	—	Won	
2021	7th Maya Awards	Best Couple (shared with Putthipong Assaratanakul)	I Told Sunset About You	Nominated	
2021	7th Maya Awards	Male Rising Star	—	Nominated	
2022	Maya Entertain Awards	Male Rising star of the year		Nominated	
2022	Maya Entertain Awards	Couple of the year (shared with Putthipong Assaratanakul)	"แปลรักฉันด้วยใจเธอ" (I Told Sunset About You)	Nominated	
2022	Maya Entertain Awards	Male Artist of the year		Nominated	
2022	TOTY MUSIC AWARDS 2021	Best Rookies	It's Okay Not To Be Alright	Won	
2022	TOTY MUSIC AWARDS 2021	The Best Music of The Year: OST	Safe Zone (Note: shared with Billkin)	Nominated	
2022	18th Komchadluek Awards	Popular Actor	—	Won	
2022	18th Komchadluek Awards	Popular Singer	—	Won	
2022	18th Komchadluek Awards	Best couple (shared with Putthipong Assaratanakul)	—	Won	
2022	Siamrath online award 2021	Best Couple (shared with Putthipong Assaratanakul)	—	Won	
2022	16th Kazz Awards	Popular Male artist		Nominated	
2022	Seoul International Drama Awards 2022	Outstanding Asian Star Prize	I Promised You the Moon	Won	
2022	The Guitar Mag Awards 2022	New Wave of the Year	—	Won	
2022	The Guitar Mag Awards 2022	Best Collaboration Song of the Year	Safe Zone	Nominated	
2022	Sudsapda Y Awards 2022	All Time Popular	—	Won	
2022	Sudsapda Y Awards 2022	Favorite Social Media Star	—	Won	
2022	Sudsapda Y Awards 2022	Best Original Soundtrack (shared with Putthipong Assaratanakul)	Safe Zone	Won	
2022	2022 Asia Artist Awards (AAA)	Asia Celebrity (Television)	—	Won	
2022	TikTok Awards Thailand 2022	Viral Song of the Year	I'll Do It How You Like It	Won	
2023	Nine Entertain Awards 2023	Song of the Year	Fire Boy	Nominated	
2023	Mint Awards 2023	The Inspiration Awards	—	Won	
2023	HOWE Awards	Popular Vote Award	—	Won	
2023	19th Komchadluek Awards	Popular Modern Thai Singer	—	Won	
2023	TikTok Awards Thailand 2023	Viral Song of the Year	Fire Boy	Won	
2023	LINE TODAY Poll of the Year 2023	Popular Singer of the Year	—	Won	
2024	LINE MELODY MUSIC AWARDS 2023	Best Male Artist	—	Won	
2025	LINE MELODY MUSIC AWARDS 2024	MELODY of the Year	friend to friend	Won	
2025	Sanook Top of the Year 2024	Popular Vote of the Year	—	Won	
2025	13th Thailand Social Awards	Best Creator Performance on Social Media - Solo Male Artist	—	Finalist	
2025	The Guitar Mag Awards 2025	Best Male Artist of the Year	—	Nominated	
2025	The Guitar Mag Awards 2025	Best Collaboration Song of the Year	Surrender	Nominated	
2025	The Guitar Mag Awards 2025	Popular Vote	—	Won	
2025	TOTY MUSIC AWARDS 2024	ALBUM PACKAGING OF THE YEAR	Undress (Note: Designed by PP Krit Ent. Creative Team & GHOSTFAC BKK STUDIO)	Nominated	
2025	The Viral Hits Awards 2024	Best BL Series Couple of the Year (shared with Putthipong Assaratanakul)	—	Won	
2025	Weibo Gala 2025	Most Influential Overseas Luminary of the stage	—	Won	
2025	Lifestyle Asia Thailand 50 Icons of 2025	Global Icon	—	Won	
2025	TMElive International Music Awards 2025	Most Influentials Internaltional Artist of the Year	—	Won	
2025	FEED x KHAOSOD AWARDS 2025	Best Concert of the Year	PP KRIT My Pleasure Concert	Won	
2025	JOOX Top Music Night 2025	Most Influentials Artist of the Year	—	Won	
2025	JOOX Top Music Night 2025	JOOX x Weibo Social Buzz Artist of the Year	—	Won	
2025	Harper's BAZAAR Women of the Year	Phenomenon	—	Won	
2026	THAIRATH AWARDS 2025	T-POP of the Year	—	Won	
2026	Thailand Box Office Awards 2025	Actor of the Year (Movie)	The Red Envelope	Won	
2026	Thailand Box Office Awards 2025	OST of the Year	GFF Ghost Friend Forever	Nominated	
2026	The Guitar Mag Awards 2026	Popular Vote of the Year	—	Won	
2026	Nine Entertainment Awards 2026	Thai Global Rising Star	—	Won	
2026	LINE MELODY MUSIC AWARDS 2025	Best Male Artist	—	Won	
2026	LINE MELODY MUSIC AWARDS 2025	BLACK MELODY	What's going on	Won	
2026	LINE MELODY MUSIC AWARDS 2025	BLACK MELODY of the Year	Oopsy Daisy	Nominated	
2026	LINE MELODY MUSIC AWARDS 2025	BLACK MELODY of the Year	What's going on	Nominated	
2026	Weibo International Entertainment Award	2026 WIEA Favorite International Artist	—	Won	
2026	The Viral Hits Awards 2026	People's Choice Award for Most Popular Solo Artist	—	Won	
2026	Weibo Gala 2026	Weibo Thailand Outstanding Music Expression Artist	—	Won	

=== Listicles ===
Year	Publisher	Listicle	Placement	Ref.
2021	Thairath	Thairath Star Poll - BL Couple of the Year (Note: shared with Billkin)	3rd	
2022	Thairath	Thairath Star Poll - BL Couple of the Year	1st	
2022	The People	Chosen by The People 2022	Honored	
2023	Tatler Asia	Asia’s Most Influential 2023	Honored	
2023	Thairath	Thairath Star Poll - BL Couple of the Year	1st	
2023	LINE TODAY	LINE TODAY POLL OF THE YEAR - Popular Artist	1st	
2024	Thairath	Thairath Star Poll - Celebrities ' Favorite	1st	
2024	Thairath	Thairath Star Poll - BL Couple of the Year	1st	
2024	LINE TODAY	LINE TODAY POLL OF THE YEAR - Popular Artist	1st	
2024	Thailand Social Awards	12th Top 5 Best Creator Performance on Social Media - Solo Artist	Listed	
2024	Weibo Music Awards	2024 Top 10 Recommended Persons of the Year - Overseas Singer	3rd (Note: Names were listed in alphabetical order by English and Pinyin initials upon announcement.)	
2024	The People Awards	2024: 100 Finalists	Listed	
2024	Suan Dusit Poll	Person of the Year 2024 – Thai Male Pop Singer of the Year	5th	
2025	Thairath	Thairath Star Poll - Celebrities ' Favorite	4th	
2025	Thairath	Thairath Star Poll - BL/GL Couple of the Year	2nd	
2025	Forbes	30 Under 30 Asia (Entertainment & Sports)	Honored	
2025	Lifestyle Asia	Lifestyle Asia Thailand 50 Icons of 2025 - Global Icon	Honored	
2025	Weibo Music Awards	2025 Top 10 Recommended Persons of the Year - Overseas Singer	1st	
2025	Thailand Social Awards	13th Top 5 Best Creator Performance on Social Media - Solo Male Artist	Listed	
2025	Suan Dusit Poll	Person of the Year 2025 – Thai Pop Singer of the Year	4th	
2025	LINE TODAY	LINE TODAY POLL OF THE YEAR - Actor of the Year	1st	
2026	The People Awards	2026: 100 Finalists	Listed	
