= Parada Thitawachira =

Soraya Titawasira โสรญา ฐิตะวชิระ
- Also known as: Smile The Star 8
- Born: Soraya Titawasira; February 8, 1996 (age 29)
- Origin: Thailand
- Genres: Pop; R&B
- Occupations: Singer; actress; MC; YouTubers
- Years active: 2012–present
- Labels: Exact, GMM Grammy
- Website: Official website

Soraya Titawasira (Thai: โสรญา ฐิตะวชิระ), better known by her stage name Smile The Star 8, is a Thai singer and actress. She is under contract with GMM Grammy record label Exact. She became famous during her appearance in season 8 of the television program The Star.

== Filmography ==
=== TV Dramas ===
Year	Thai title	Title	Network	Role	Notes	With
2013–2014	อีสา-รวีช่วงโชติ	E-Sa 2013; E-Sa Rawee Chuangchod	Channel 5	p p		
2014	ฝันเฟื่อง	Fun Fueng 2014	One 31	กุ๊กกิ๊ก; Kukkik		Warawut Poyim
2018	สัมผัสรัตติกาล	Sampat Ruttikan 2018	GMM 25	เบญจนุช (โบ); Benjanuch (Bow)		Poom Rangsithananon
2018	ไร้เสน่หา	Rai Saneha 2018	GMM 25	อนุพัชรี (แอ้ม); Anuphatcharee (Am)		
2018	มนต์ฮักทรานซิสเตอร์ สะออนซอนเด	Monrak Transistor 2018	GMM 25	ว ท (ว); W T (W)		Pongnirun Kantajinda
2018–2019	ขุนปราบดาบข้ามภพ	Khun Prab Darb Kham Pope 2018	One 31	แก้ว (อดีต) ก้านตอง ศิริมณีแก้ว (ปัจจุบัน)		Vorakorn Sirisorn
2021	ผู้ใหญ่สันต์ กำนันศรี	Poo Yai San Gamnan See 2021	One 31	วรรณนภา ทวีวงษ์ (วิว); Wannapa Taweewong (Wiew)		Napat Injaiuea
2021	ภูผาผีคุ้ม	Poo Paa Pee Kum 2021	One 31	เดือน (); Deun ()		Phetch Boranin
2022	ครูมะ ห้อง ป.3 ก.		Kroo Lalana ()	Thai PBS		Arak Amornsupasiri

=== TV Series ===
Year	Thai title	Title	Network	Role	Notes	With
2014	เพื่อนเฮี้ยน..โรงเรียนหลอน ตอนที่ 2 ตาย-ตาม	ThirTEEN Terrors	GMM 25	Jen ()		
2016	Love Rhythms ตอน Daddy จำเป็น		GMM 25	()		
2017	Love Songs Love Series To Be Continued ตอน ขอบคุณที่รักกัน ตอน th:เลิฟซองส์เลิฟซีรีส์#ขอบคุณที่รักกัน	Love Songs Love Series To Be Continued	GMM 25	()		
2018		Love Books Love Series	GMM 25	()		
2018		Love Songs Love Series	GMM 25	()		
2020	แปลรักฉันด้วยใจเธอ ภาค 1	1 : I Told Sunset About You	LINE TV	Tan ()		Putthipong Assaratanakul
2021	แปลรักฉันด้วยใจเธอ ภาค 2	2 : I Promised You The Moon	LINE TV	Tan (Cammo)		
2021	Super แม้น ยอดคนธรรมดา			I-Zone ()		Suppasit Jongcheveevat
2022	th:คลับสะพานฟาย 2 Class ซิฟาย ตอน ตกกะไดพลอยรัก		AIS Play	Lin		Tonhon Tantivejakul

=== TV Sitcom ===
Year	Thai title	Title	Network	Role	Notes	With
2012–2014	บ้านนี้มีรัก ปี 7-9	Baan Nee Mee Ruk Year 7-9	Channel 9			

=== Film ===
Year	Thai Title	Title	Role	Note	Reference
2014	แผลเก่า	Plae kao (2014)	Chomphoo		

=== Master of Ceremony: MC ===
==== Television ====
- 20 : ทุกวัน เวลา น. On Air

==== Online ====
- 2018 : - On Air YouTube:Smile Parada

=== Music video ===
Year	Song Title	English Title	Artist	Notes	Ref.
20			S		
20			T		

== Discography ==
=== Songs ===
Year	Song Title	English Title	Note	Ref.
2016	อ้าว - atom ชนกันต์ Cover		Single	
2017	มีแฟนแล้ว - Oat pramote ft .urboytj cover by		Single	

=== Drama Series Songs ===
Year	Drama	English title	Television Drama	Song title	English title
2013	ไอ้คุณผี		Channel 3	หลอกนาน ๆ ร่วมกับ Appie Frame Stop	
2018	ปาก	Pak 2018	GMM 25	ปาก	SPEAK YOUR MIND
2021	ผู้ใหญ่สันต์ กํานันศรี	Poo Yai San Gamnan See 2021	One 31	คิดอะไรอยุ่ x Napat Injaiuea (Feat.Saksit Tangthong x Sujira Aroonpipat)	

== Live shows ==
=== Stage play ===
Year	Title	Role	Place	Date	Ref.
20					

=== Concert ===
Year	Title	Place	Date	Ref.
20				
