= I Told Sunset About You =

2020–21 Thai television series

I Told Sunset About You I Promised You the Moon
- Promotional poster
- แปลรักฉันด้วยใจเธอ; Plae Rak Chan Duai Chai Thoe
- Genre: Romance, drama, coming-of-age
- Directed by: Naruebet Kuno; Tossaphon Riantong
- Starring: Putthipong Assaratanakul; Krit Amnuaydechkorn
- Country of origin: Thailand
- Original language: Thai
- No. of seasons: 2
- No. of episodes: 10

Production
- Producers: Songyos Sugmakanan; Kriangkrai Vachiratamporn; Naruebet Kuno
- Running time: 69–84 minutes
- Production company: Nadao Bangkok

Original release
- Network: Line TV
- Release: 22 October 2020 – 24 June 2021

I Told Sunset About You / I Promised You the Moon (known in Thai as แปลรักฉันด้วยใจเธอ; RTGS: Plae Rak Chan Duai Chai Thoe, lit. 'interpret my love with your heart') is a Thai coming-of-age series by Nadao Bangkok. It stars Putthipong Assaratanakul (Billkin) and Krit Amnuaydechkorn (PP) as teenage boys Teh and Oh-aew, and explores their relationship as they come to terms with identity, teenage angst, and love.

The series comprises two parts, with five episodes each. Part 1, titled I Told Sunset About You, is directed by Naruebet Kuno, and follows Teh and Oh-aew's lives in Phuket as they prepare for university admissions, while part 2, titled I Promised You the Moon and directed by Tossaphon Riantong, picks up after their entry into university and is set in Bangkok.

The series was released via the Line TV streaming platform, with episodes shown weekly on Thursdays at 20:00. Part 1 was released from 22 October to 19 November 2020, and part 2 from 27 May to 24 June 2021. A 14-minute short film, titled Last Twilight in Phuket, was released on 20 May 2021, serving as a thematic bridge between the two parts. The series was available outside Thailand through Vimeo.

Part 1 of the series was well received, with praise given for its story, performances and cinematography. The series is accompanied by a behind-the-scenes documentary series, as well as original songs and music videos, as part of the promotion plan BKPP Project.

== Synopsis ==
=== I Told Sunset About You ===
Part 1, I Told Sunset About You, follows the relationship of Teh and Oh-aew, schoolboys living in Phuket who used to be childhood best friends but had a falling out and have not spoken for several years. Now in their final year of school, they meet again at a Chinese-language tutorial school as they prepare for university admissions. Starting out as rivals, they eventually make up and begin rebuilding their relationship as Teh helps tutor Oh-aew for their upcoming Chinese exam. They grow closer, forming a new bond that begins to extend beyond friendship but also tests their relationship as Teh struggles to understand and deal with his feelings.

Teh and Oh-aew are supported by their friends and family, but also have to deal with their own conflicting feelings for them. Teh is from a Chinese Thai family and lives with his mother and elder brother Hoon, and has a close female friend, Tarn. Oh-aew lives with his parents, who own an island resort, and is close friends with Bas, who recently joined his and Teh's mutual group of friends Mod, Kai and Phillip.

=== Last Twilight in Phuket ===
The 14-minute short film, Last Twilight in Phuket, picks up after Teh and Oh-aew become boyfriends and follows their last day in their hometown Phuket before leaving for university in Bangkok.

=== I Promised You the Moon ===
Part 2, I Promised You the Moon, explores the development of Teh and Oh-aew's relationship as they adjust to life as university students in Bangkok, with Teh becoming involved in the Drama Club at his university and meeting older fellow students Jai, Khim and Top, while Oh-aew makes a new group of friends including Q, Plug, Maengpong and Auu.

== Cast and characters ==
- Putthipong Assaratanakul (Billkin) as Teh
- Krit Amnuaydechkorn (PP) as Oh-aew

=== Part 1 cast ===
- Nat Kitcharit as Ko Hoon, Teh's older brother
- Parada Thitawachira (Smile) as Tarn, Teh's female friend from upper-secondary school
- Pongpol Panyamit (Khunpol) as Bas, a friend of Oh-aew's who recently joined Moraoyulok, Oh-aew and Teh's group of mutual friends since lower-secondary school
- Jirayus Khawbaimai (Rolex) as Kai, a member of Moraoyulok
- Theethat Suk-im (Dream) as Phillip, a member of Moraoyulok
- Christiaan Churaporn Bos as Mod, a member of Moraoyulok
- Kanchana Pakviwat as Sui, Teh's mother
- Prapassorn Chansatitporn as Oh-aew's mother
- Udom Lalitnithi as Oh-aew's father
- Fu Nan as Fu Nan, the Chinese tutor
- Pitchanan Jiemsirikarn (Nobel) as young Teh
- Inthanon Seangsiripaisarn (Pupa) as young Oh-aew

=== Part 2 cast ===
- Oabnithi Wiwattanawarang as Jai, one of Teh's older fellow students from the Drama Club
- Arachaporn Pokinpakorn as Khim, the Drama Club president
- Naphat Vikairungroj as Top, another Drama Club member
- Taninrat Wadsriwat as Q, a member of Oh-aew's group of friends
- Sarit Trilertvichien as Maengpong, another member of the group
- Kamolpipat Bunnag as Plug, another member of the group
- Chayapak Tunprayoon as Auu, another member of the group
- Porntip Kitdamrongchai as Dream
- Pakin Kunaanuwit (Mark) as Mek, Teh's roommate
- Ploy Siriudomset as Nan
- Panwa Promtep as Guy

== Production ==
=== Conception ===
The series was conceived shortly after Nadao Bangkok's previous series My Ambulance concluded in October 2019. A side couple from that series, played by Putthipong and Krit, had attracted a large fanbase, especially among shippers, and My Ambulance director Naruebet Kuno, in response to audience feedback, briefly considered featuring them in a sequel, but abandoned the idea as it could not be fitted into the earlier story. Instead, he opted to create a new story based on a topic he wanted to explore, that of a relationship between two teenage boys. He presented the idea to Nadao producers and executives Songyos Sugmakanan and Kriangkrai Vachiratamporn, who agreed that a simple coming-of-age story would make a refreshing change of pace from the fantastical My Ambulance. The project was pitched to Line TV, who were eager to produce another collaboration with Nadao Bangkok and promptly agreed to finance the project as Nadao's fourth Line TV original series.

The series was developed as part of what Nadao termed the "BKPP Project", an integrated promotion plan centred on the two actors and codenamed after their nicknames, Billkin and PP. In addition to the series itself, Nadao planned to release music singles and behind-the-scene documentary series, and hold a fan meeting event. The series was envisioned as a ten-episode story following the development of the characters' relationship from their school days and as they adjust to university life, and Kriangkrai suggested the approach of splitting the series into two self-contained five-episode parts.

=== Development ===
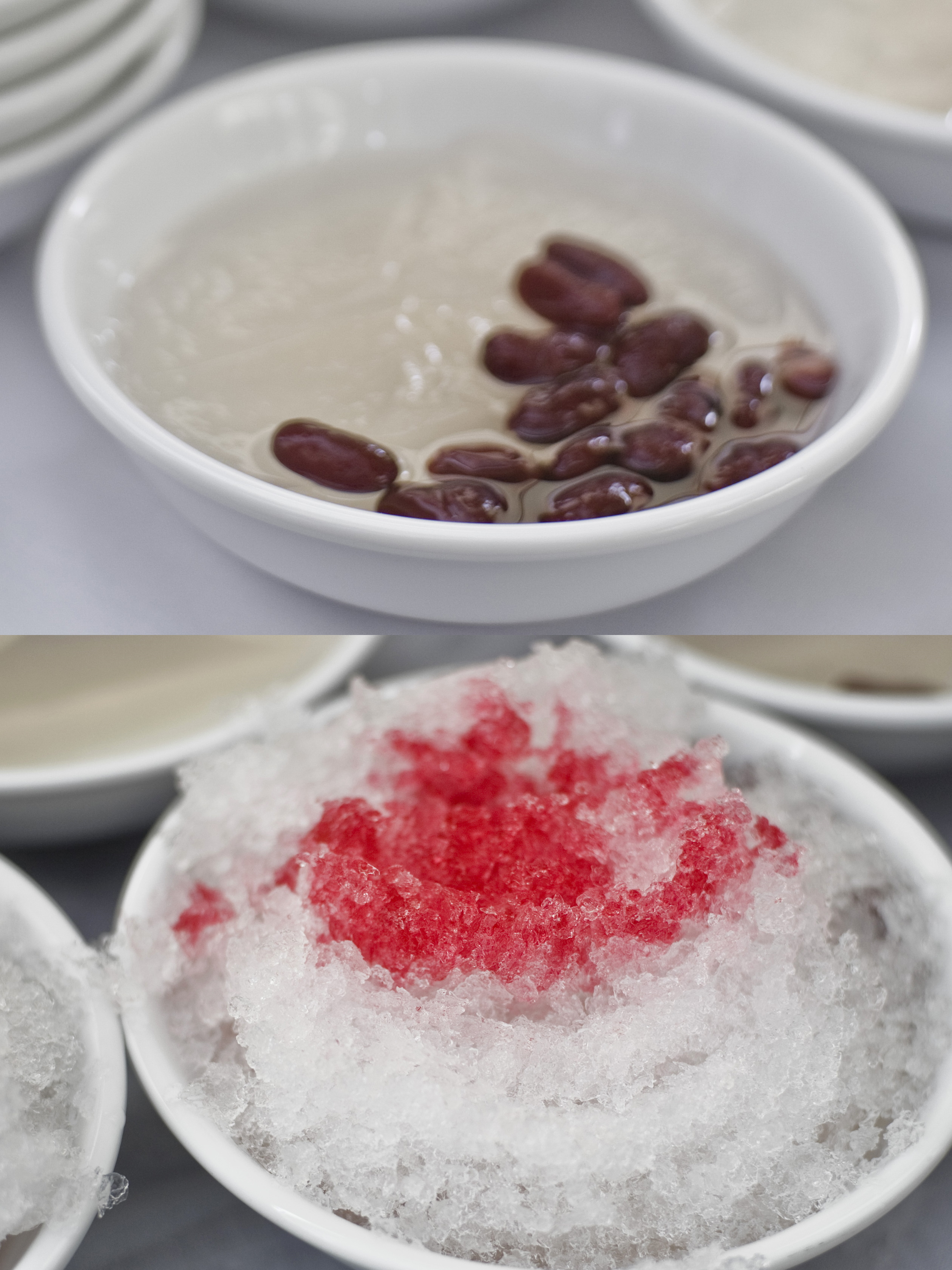
The writers took inspiration from Phuket's local cuisine, and named one of the main characters after the shaved-ice dessert o-aew.

Development of part 1 began in December 2019, with Naruebet at the helm. He invited Karakade Norasethaporn and Naron Cherdsoongnern, both of whom he had worked with as fellow students at the Faculty of Communication Arts of Chulalongkorn University, to develop the screenplay with him. Arachaporn Pokinpakorn, one of Naruebet's co-writers from My Ambulance, later joined the team. The project was Karakade and Naron's first screenwriting experience; Karakade primarily worked as a writer and editor, and Naron as a flight attendant.

As is often Nadao's approach, the writers interviewed the lead actors to aid the development of the script, partly basing the characters on their personalities and taking inspiration from their experiences. The characters meeting at tutorial school, for example, was an early plot point based on Putthipong and Krit's introduction in real life. The actors joined in improvisation sessions with the writers in January 2020, and the project was teased via Nadao Bangkok's Twitter account on 14 January.

Naruebet envisioned visually rich imagery for the series, and wanted a locale that would serve as an atmospheric backdrop. The writers briefly considered Ayutthaya, as well as several other provinces, before settling on Phuket, which offered the combination of beaches, hills, and an urban environment. With a rough draft for the story, the team conducted a research trip to the Southern island province in late January. They took inspiration from Phuket's multicultural heritage, Sino-Portuguese architecture and local cuisine, and set the story mainly in Phuket's Old Town. Several food items are featured in the story, including the Hokkien noodles sold by Teh's mother and the dessert o-aew, which inspired the name of Krit's character. The names of the characters Teh and Hoon, meanwhile, are from the Hokkien words for tea (茶; tê) and rice vermicelli (米粉; bí-hún), one of many nods to the Hokkien Chinese heritage which forms a large part of Phuket's culture. Chinese culture is also featured in the story through the language (as Mandarin), which plays a central role in the university-admissions plot, contributed to by language consultant Suppawat Zhou. Phuket's pluralism is also reflected through language, with several characters speaking in the Southern Thai dialect and employing code switching during conversation.

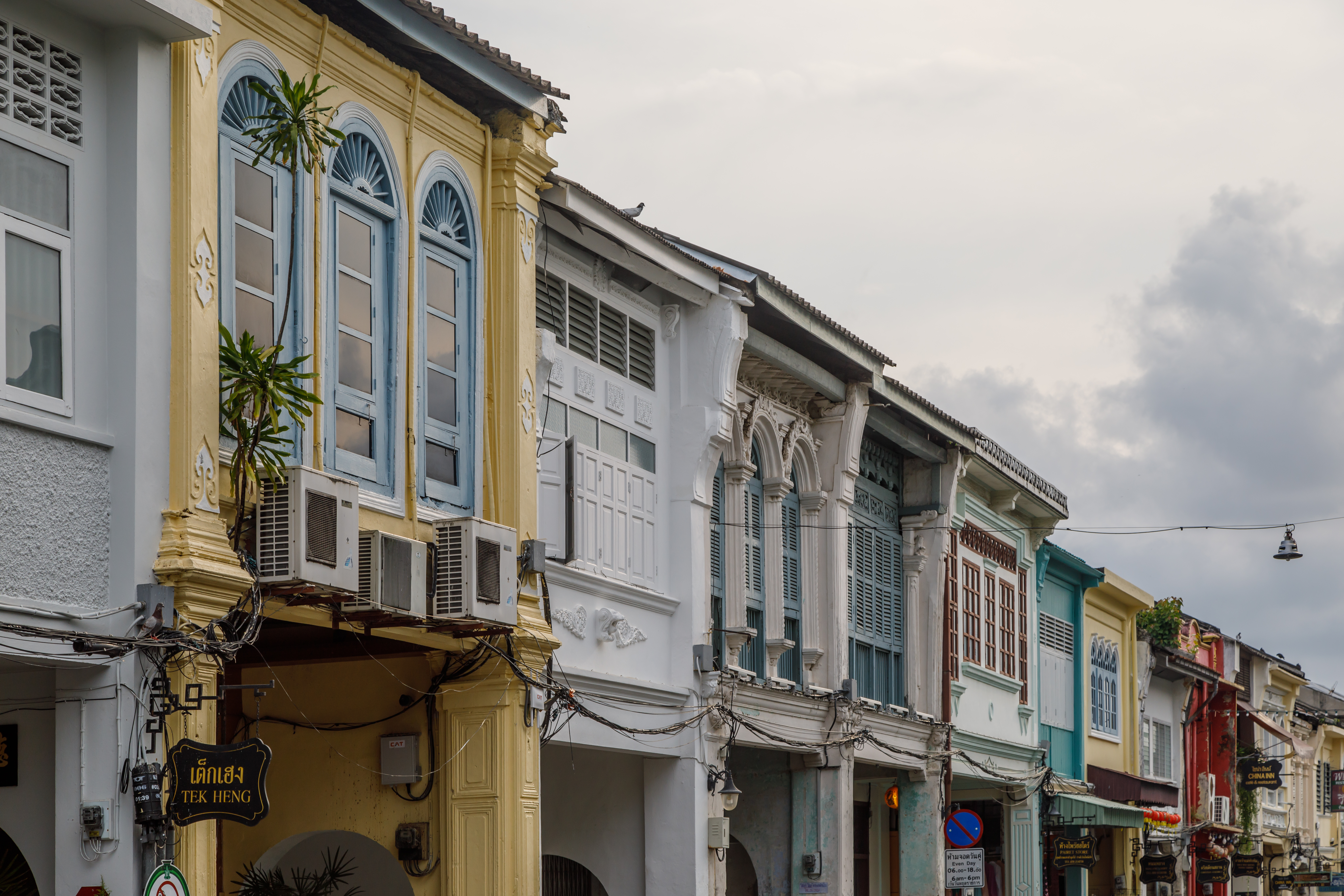
Multiple locations in Phuket's Old Town were featured in the series.

The writers saw the series as first and foremost a coming-of-age story, and created a character-driven narrative focusing on the characters' internal conflicts, having them questioning and learning to understand their own feelings through experience. They employed a lot of symbolism to visually enhance the storytelling. The Chinese hibiscus flower, for example, is commonly used in school textbooks to illustrate the concept of a perfect flower—one with both male and female structures—and the writers used it in different scenes to alternatively represent male and female characters, while leaving open the possibility for viewers to differently interpret the flower's metaphorical meanings. They originally planned for forty-minute episodes, but with the gradually increasing ambition of the project, ended up at almost twice the length.

The project was officially announced by Line TV at its Line Nexplosion 2020 event on 19 February, under the working title BKPP: The Series. It was originally slated for a July 2020 release. However, production was delayed as the COVID-19 pandemic spread through Thailand in March, just as work was entering pre-production. After one of its actors tested positive for the virus, Nadao closed its office from 20 March and advised its staff to self-isolate. The writers, who had until then had almost daily face-to-face meetings, continued working via conference calls, and used the time to further refine the screenplay. A first read-through was held with lead actors Putthipong and Krit via Zoom video call on 24 April, after which some further refinements continued, totalling about 5 1/2 months of screenplay development.

The series entered pre-production under isolation conditions, with the crew holding online meetings where each department presented their work via video conference. Though travel restrictions were in place, one of the crew members lived in Phuket and was able to do location work outside of curfew hours.

=== Casting ===
As the disease came under control, the country began easing restrictions around mid-May, allowing in-person auditions to take place. With the lead actors already fixed for the project, casting for the supporting roles focused on ensuring good chemistry with Putthipong and Krit. The task was split among the casting directors: A-tis Asanachinda, who had done extensive casting work with Nadao, covered the roles of Bas, Hoon, and young Teh and Oh-aew, while Nantanat Thakadkul, who had also co-written My Ambulance, was responsible for the others.

For the role of Hoon, Nat Kitcharit was among the first choices A-tis considered, having been impressed by his lead appearance in the 2018 film App War. The roles of Tarn and Bas, in particular, depended on chemistry with the main actors, and Tarn had to speak Southern Thai. Parada Thitawachira, a TV actress and singer, was invited to audition for the role after the crew came upon a Facebook video of her rapping to a popular song in the dialect, and was promptly chosen. On the other hand, the crew had difficulty filling the role of Bas until Songyos suggested auditioning Pongpol Panyamit, who had earlier been recruited to Nadao Academy, the company's recently launched talent development project. Pongpol had no acting experience and didn't match Naruebet's vision of the character, but his portrayal impressed Naruebet and secured the role.

The crew was also particular about the roles of young Teh and Oh-aew, which required resemblance with their older counterparts as well as the ability to convey the characters. Pitchanan Jiemsirikarn and Inthanon Seangsiripaisarn, neither of whom had acting experience, were ultimately deemed the best fit for the roles. Like Pongpol, both had earlier been discovered by Nadao crew when scouting for the Nadao Academy project. The roles of Teh and Oh-aew's friends Kai, Phillip and Mod were filled by teen actors Jirayus Khawbaimai, Theethat Suk-im and Christiaan Churaporn Bos, respectively. Apart from the two leads, Jirayus was the only Nadao-signed actor to appear in the series.

A complete read-through with all the actors was held on 2 June. The actors underwent several acting workshops around mid-June, which focused on the lead actors' understanding of their characters as well as interactions between character pairs and groups. The lead actors also worked with their younger counterparts, who learned to imitate their demeanour and mannerisms. Screenwriter Arachaporn and casting director Nantanat also served as acting coaches, together with Romchat Tanalappipat and others.

In preparation for the series, Putthipong and Krit took Chinese lessons, practised phrases in the Southern accent, learned to ride the motorcycle, and had lessons in scuba diving. Putthipong also learned to sing Chinese opera, while Krit lost 10 kilograms (22 lb) for the role. Speaking of the experience of their first lead roles, both say they felt tremendous pressure and responsibility, which was compounded by each day's almost continuous shooting. The two are close friends in real life, which they note helped greatly in assuming their roles.

=== Filming ===
Filming locations included (1) Kopitiam by Wilai, (2) On On Hotel, (3) Bang Neow shrine, (4) Dibuk Restaurant, (5) Soi Rommanee, (6) Sang Tham Shrine, (7) Phuket Thai Hua Museum, (8) Cape Panwa Hotel, (9) Ao Po Grand Marina, (10) Krathing Cape, and (11) Phrom Thep Cape.'"`UNIQ--ref-00000025-QINU`"'

A blessing ceremony, marking the start of production, was held on 4 June. Principal photography took place in July, with three weeks spent in Phuket and few more scenes shot in Bangkok. Filming in Phuket commenced on 1 July, and alternated between filming days and break days, during which the camera crew would plan and block shots for upcoming scenes. Filming was highly subject to weather conditions, as it took place during the rainy season, frequently necessitating impromptu changes to the shooting schedule, managed by line producer Patcharaporn Liewpairoj.

The series employed multiple locations in Phuket's Old Town, as well as several places further afield around the island. Filming employed a two-camera setup, overseen by director of photography Tawanwad Wanavit. Tawanwad worked with Naruebet to produce their shared vision of a visually cinematic piece, and used warm lighting to accentuate the tones for the scenes, most of which employed a colour palette highlighting the primaries red, green and blue, which was also factored in the costume and art design. (Teh and Oh-aew are represented in large part by the colours blue and red, respectively, which were expressed through clothing prepared by costume designer Chayanuch Savekvattana, who was working with Nadao Bangkok for the first time.)

As the series entered editing in August, Naruebet found the emotional arc in some scenes to be lacking, and the story hard to follow in places. He discussed the matter with producer Songyos, who decided to have the scenes reshot. Following modification of the screenplay and further workshopping by the actors, the crew spent another two weeks in September reshooting in Phuket, during which music videos for the series' several songs were also filmed. Editing was led by Foolhouse Production's Rachaphun Phisutsinthop, who had worked with Naruebet on My Ambulance and 2017's Project S: "Side by Side". The music score was created by Hualampong Riddim and composed by the studio's head Vichaya Vatanasapt, who had also worked on "Side by Side". Editing continued alongside the release of the series in October.

=== Part 2 ===
As part 2 entered development when part 1 was still under production, the directorial role was handed over to Tossaphon Riantong, who had worked in several of Nadao Bangkok's and its parent GDH's projects as a screenwriter. Naruebet moved on to the role of producer, together with Songyos. Karakade continued as screenwriter from part 1, developing the screenplay together with Tossaphon and Vasudhorn Piyaromna (Tossaphon and Vasudhorn had worked as co-writers on In Family We Trust and Bad Genius: The Series).

Patcharaporn, A-tis and Chayanuch reprised their respective roles as line producer, casting director and costume designer for part 2. Newly introduced cast members include Oabnithi Wiwattanawarang, part 1 writer Arachaporn, and Naphat Vikairungroj as Teh's fellow students Jai, Khim and Top; and Kamolpipat Bunnag, Sarit Trilertvichien, Taninrat Wadsriwat, and Chayapak Tunprayoon as Oh-aew's friends Plug, Maengpong, Q and Auu. The blessing ceremony for part 2 was held on 7 December 2020, and the main cast met for the read-through session on 8 December. Acting workshops during pre-production were overseen by acting coach Prawee Saeueng, while Warunya Munkaew served the role during filming.

Boonyanuch Kraithong served as director of photography for part 2. Production began around mid-December, but was halted in early January 2021 due to renewed outbreaks of the virus. Filming later resumed and concluded in February, with additional shoots in April. As with part 1, editing was done by Foolhouse Production, with a music score by Hualampong Riddim's Vichaya Vatanasapt.

== Release ==
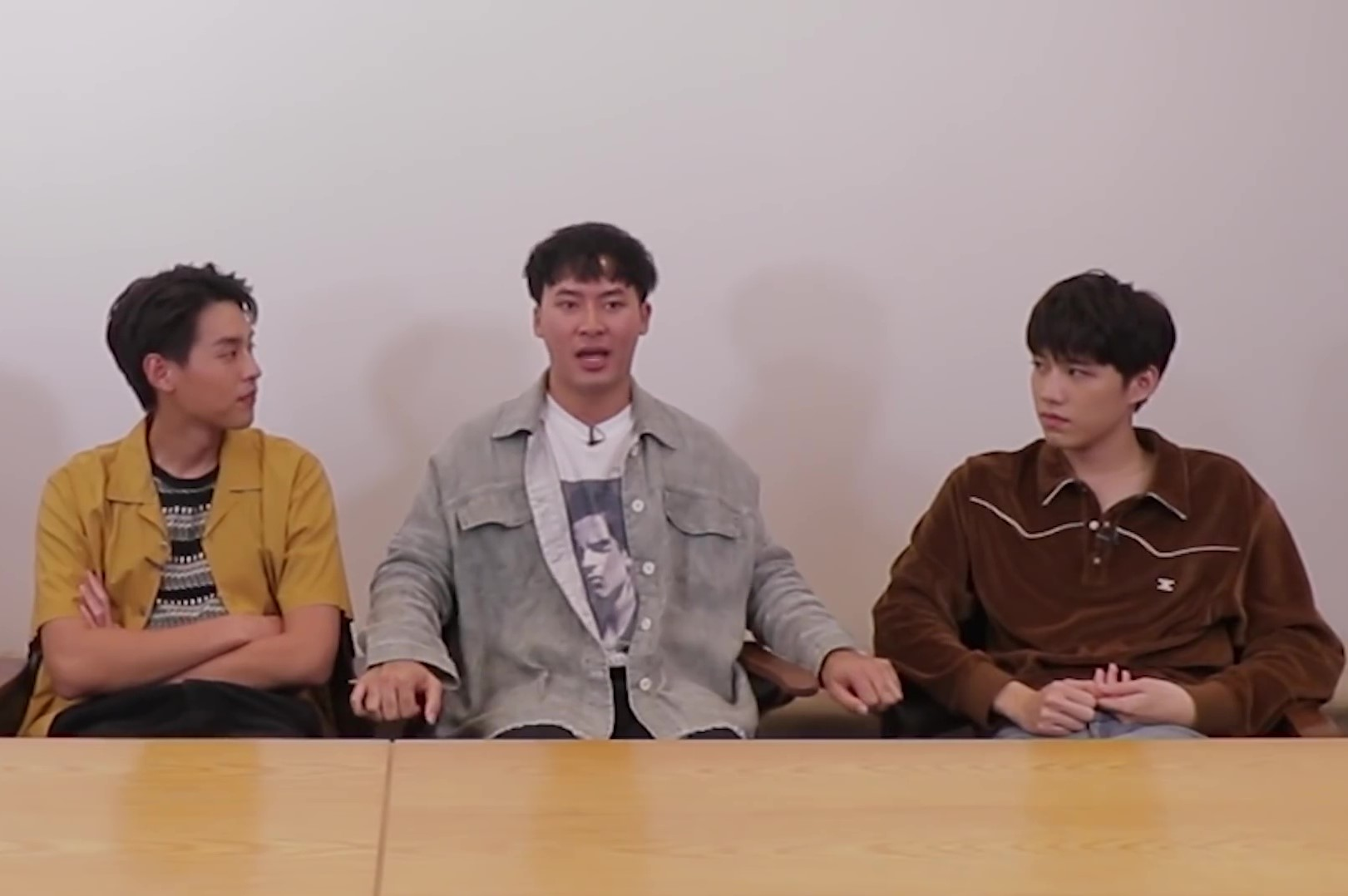
Director Naruebet (centre), with lead actors Putthipong (left) and Krit, at a publicity interview in October 2020

The series' official Thai name, as well as its premiere date of 22 October, was announced at the blessing ceremony on 4 June 2020. Nadao Bangkok also released a timeline for the BKPP Project, announcing the fan meeting event on 30 January 2021 and teasing an unannounced event on 11 March. The theme song "Skyline" was released on 30 September, and the series was officially announced (and the trailer released) at a press event on 8 October.

The five episodes of I Told Sunset About You were released weekly through the Line TV streaming service (in Thailand) at 20:00 on Thursdays, from 22 October to 19 November 2020. They were also made available with English and Chinese subtitles outside Thailand via Vimeo On Demand, for a per-episode rental fee, initially set at US$12 but later reduced to $5.99 for subsequent episodes.

The series' second part, with an originally scheduled release date of 11 March 2021, was revealed with the fifth and final episode of part 1, and officially announced at a press event on 21 November. However, its release, as well as the fan meeting event, was postponed due to the new outbreak of COVID-19 cases. A new release date of 27 May 2021 was announced in February.

Nadao Bangkok began promoting the release of part 2 in April, releasing the poster and announcing the English title I Promised You the Moon on 19 April, and the theme song "Safe Zone" on the 29th. The trailer was released on 13 May, and the short film Last Twilight in Phuket, billed as a side story to the series, was shown in a surprise release on 20 May. Part 2 was released from 27 May to 24 June 2021 on Line TV and Vimeo, following the original weekly schedule.

As the pandemic's largest wave surged in Thailand around mid-2021, Nadao Bangkok issued refunds for tickets to the fan meeting event, and ultimately announced the cancellation of the event in March 2022. A smaller outdoor concert, titled Plae Rak Chan Duai Chai Thoe The Last Twilight: Music in the Park, was instead held at the Chulalongkorn University Centenary Park on 26 March 2022 as the closing event for the BKPP Project. (Note: Nadao Bangkok had been planning to end its artist-management and series- and music-producing operations; this was later announced in May.)

Line TV ended its service in Thailand at the end of 2021. The series, along with Line TV's other original works, was later made available in Thailand via the Line Today website.

The series has also received local distribution in a few other countries: the Philippines (Part 1 being dubbed in Filipino) via the streaming platform POPTV, Taiwan via Line TV, and Japan on Wowow Prime.

=== Documentaries ===
As part of the BKPP Project, Nadao Bangkok also produced behind-the-scenes documentaries to accompany each part of the main series. They were directed and filmed by Patipol Teekayuwat, who had joined the series crew under the Nadao Intensive Trainee project. The documentary for part 1 consisted of eight twenty-minute episodes which were released weekly on Saturdays, from 19 October to 5 December 2020. (Note: The first episode was delayed by two days and released on a Monday.) The documentary series for part 2, with six episodes, was likewise shown weekly on Saturdays, from 22 May to 26 June 2021.

=== Merchandise ===
Nadao Bangkok created several items of tie-in merchandise, which were used as costumes and props in the series. They were designed by a team led by actor Sarit, who had his own apparel brand. Part 1's English title, I Told Sunset About You, in fact originated from the design for one of the shirts, which is worn by Teh in the series.

=== Soundtrack ===
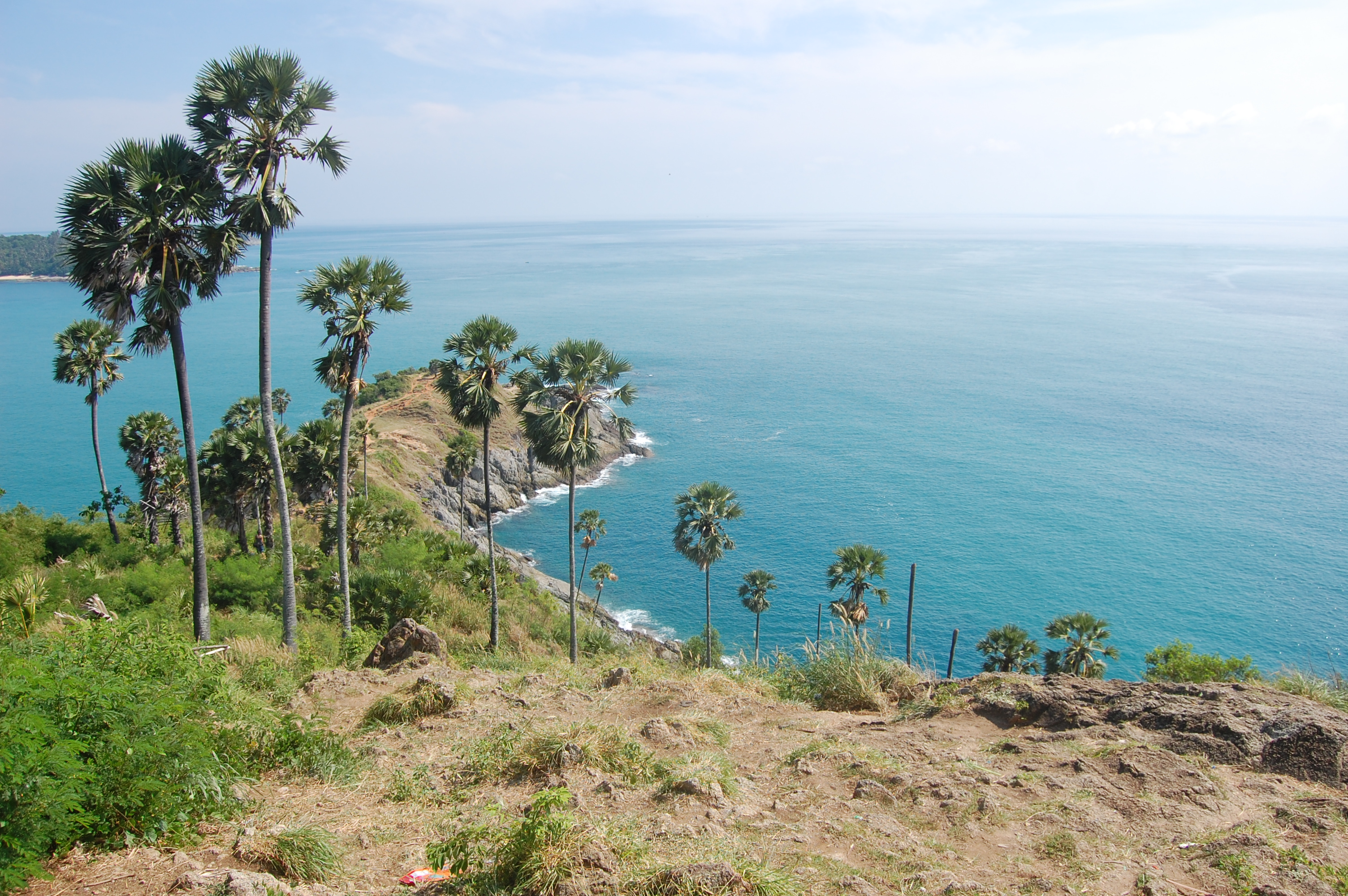
The songs' music videos were filmed at some of the locations featured in the series, including Phrom Thep Cape, the site of the titular sunset.

I Told Sunset About You was accompanied by three original songs, released in seven versions by Nadao Music (Nadao Bangkok's record label) through online streaming platforms, with music videos for each released via YouTube. The series' theme song "Skyline", whose Thai version is known as "Kit Kan" (กีดกัน 'set apart'), was sung by Putthipong and released on 30 September 2020. Subsequent releases followed each week's new episode, with Skyline's Chinese version (Rú Hé, 如何 'How?') accompanying episode 1, "Plae Mai Ok" (แปลไม่ออก 'I can't translate') for episode 2, and another version of "Rú Hé" sung by Krit featured in episode 3. The third song, "Khot Phiset" (โคตรพิเศษ 'freaking special'), had its two versions by Putthipong and Krit released following the fifth episode. Nadao also released ten tracks from the score on YouTube following the conclusion of part 1.

The songs for part 1 were recorded in August, and their accompanying music videos filmed in Phuket in September when the crew went back for reshooting. Songyos assigned the task to various members of the crew, letting them exercise their directing skills. The music video for "Skyline" was directed by series still photographer Rinrada Pornsombutsatien and director of photography Tawanwad, "Plae Mai Ok" was directed by documentary director Patipol, and Krit's version of "Khot Phiset" was directed by second assistant director Watjakorn Hankoon.

I Promised You the Moon likewise was accompanied by original songs. The theme song "Safe Zone" (known in Thai as รู้งี้เป็นแฟนกันตั้งนานแล้ว, Ru Ngi Pen Faen Kan Tang Nan Laeo), sung by Putthipong and Krit, was released on 29 April, and "Hold Me Tight" (ห่มผ้า, Hom Pha) by Krit was released following the first episode.

Song listing
No.	Title	Writer(s)	Artist	Length
1.	"Kit Kan" (Skyline/กีดกัน)	Puntapol Prasarnrajkit, Thitiwat Rongthong	Billkin	3:37
2.	"Rú Hé" (Skyline/如何)	Puntapol Prasarnrajkit, Thitiwat Rongthong; Sichen Li (lyrics)	Tulanan Narasetapisarn	3:55
3.	"Plae Mai Ok" (แปลไม่ออก)	Atom (Chanakan Rattana-udom)	Billkin	4:18
4.	"Rú Hé" (Skyline/如何)	Puntapol Prasarnrajkit, Thitiwat Rongthong; Sichen Li (lyrics)	PP Krit	3:46
5.	"Khot Phiset" (โคตรพิเศษ)	Sudkhate Jungcharoen, Achariya Dulyapaiboon	Billkin	3:58
6.	"Khot Phiset" (โคตรพิเศษ)	Sudkhate Jungcharoen, Achariya Dulyapaiboon	PP Krit	3:58
7.	"Kit Kan" (Skyline/กีดกัน, piano version)	Puntapol Prasarnrajkit, Thitiwat Rongthong	Billkin	3:46
8.	"Safe Zone" (รู้งี้เป็นแฟนกันตั้งนานแล้ว)	Achariya Dulyapaiboon	Billkin, PP Krit	3:19
9.	"Hold Me Tight" (ห่มผ้า)	Letach Ketsook	PP Krit	3:37
10.	"Fake News" (หลอกกันทั้งนั้น)	Atom (Chanakan Rattana-udom)	PP Krit	4:14
11.	"Fake News" (หลอกกันทั้งนั้น)	Atom (Chanakan Rattana-udom)	Billkin	4:10
12.	"Ta Lay See Dum" (ทะเลสีดำ (Note: Originally sung by Lula and Tar Paradox from the album Urban Lullaby.))	Tonn Sofa	Billkin, PP Krit	3:45
13.	"Coming of Age" (ไม่ปล่อยมือ)	Prateep Siri-issranan, Po Posayanukul	Billkin, PP Krit	4:25

== Reception ==
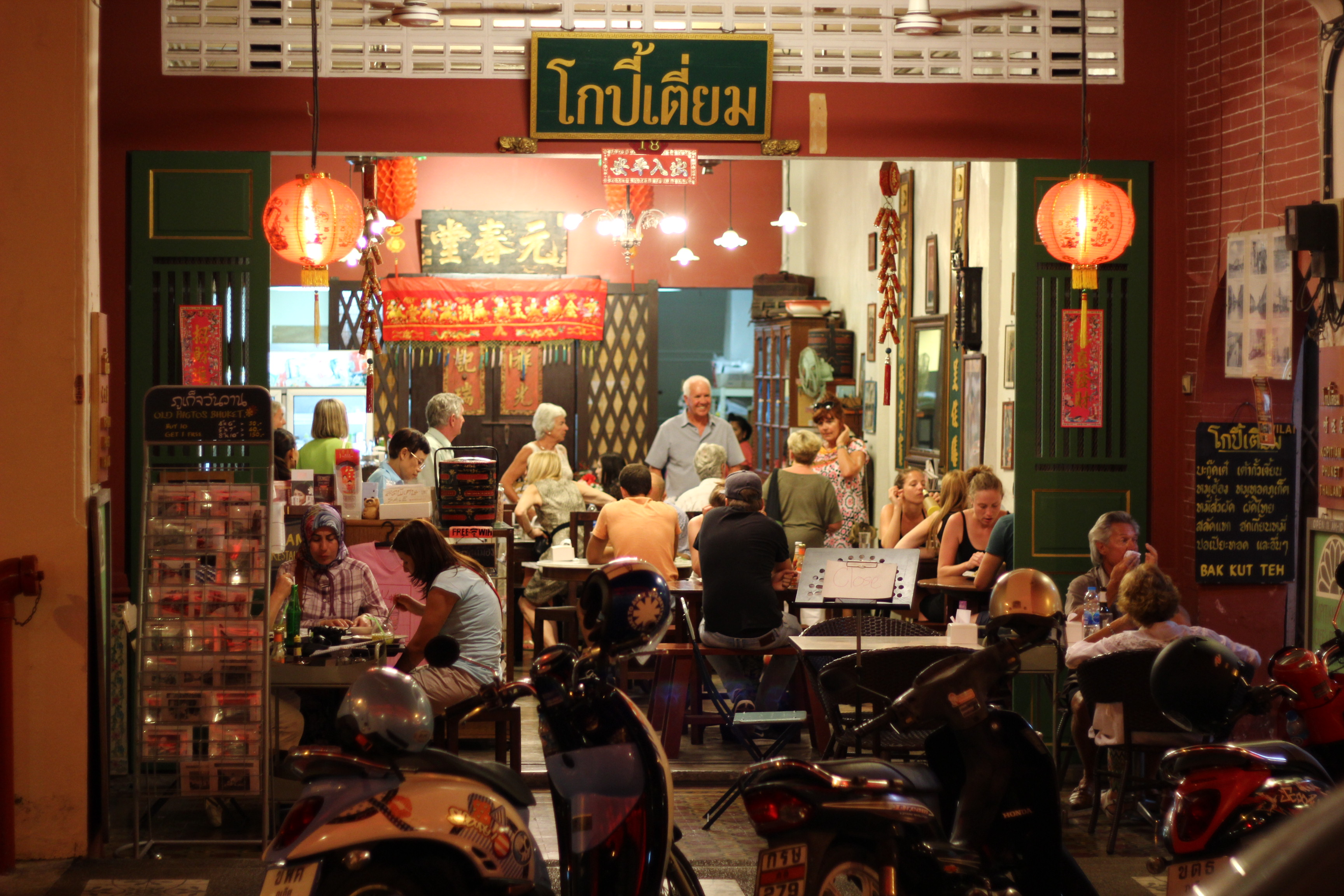
Kopitiam By Wilai (pictured in 2014), as well as other filming locations, saw large increases in visitors following the series' release.

Part 1 of the series received enthusiastic responses from viewers, with associated hashtags becoming the top trending item on Twitter in Thailand during each week's release, as well as globally for later episodes. It was the most viewed series on the Line TV platform for November 2020. It was also popular internationally, with significant followings in Vietnam, Japan, Myanmar, Indonesia, Malaysia, and especially in China, where it rose to the top-rated list on the review website Douban with an aggregate rating of 9.4 out of 10.

Feedback for the series was highly positive, with praise given for the acting and chemistry between the two leads, as well as the cinematography, which effectively conveyed the charms of the Phuket setting. Some viewers compared its mood and tone to that of the 2017 film Call Me by Your Name. Reviewers also took note of the emotionally affecting writing, and commended the story for its approach to sexuality issues. The Bangkok Post's lifestyle columnist wrote: "At times sensual, at times heartbreaking, Sunset was a well-rounded, coming-of-age drama with good writing, and beautiful cinematography to match." The marketing for I Told Sunset About You had sometimes promoted it as Nadao Bangkok's first boys' love series, and in that respect, reviewers noted its exceptional quality for the genre: the Bangkok Post noted it was "better crafted than many of its predecessors," while the Philippines' ABS-CBN's reviewer called it a game changer for the genre. Other commentators noted that the series did not fit most of the genre's conventions, (Note: The boys' love genre usually depicts homoerotic male relationships in a somewhat fantastical manner, and caters mainly to female audiences.) but actually more closely reflected those of LGBT cinema.

Part 2 was featured on Teen Vogue's best BL dramas of 2021 list.

The series' popularity helped fuel a resurgence of tourist activity in Phuket, whose tourism-oriented economy had been battered by the pandemic in 2020. The province saw about 59,000 tourist arrivals over the long weekend holiday of 10–13 December, a significant part of which comprised film tourism by fans of the series, according to the Tourism Authority of Thailand's Phuket Office. The Phuket Tourist Association noted that the series contributed to a substantial increase in visitors especially to the Old Town area and Phrom Thep Cape, which served as major filming locations.

== Awards and nominations ==
Association	Category	Nominee	Result	References
17th Komchadluek Awards	Best Drama/Series	I Told Sunset About You	Nominated	
17th Komchadluek Awards	Best Screenplay	Naruebet Kuno, Arachaporn Pokinpakorn, Karakade Norasethaporn, Naron Cherdsoongnern	Nominated	
17th Komchadluek Awards	Best Director	Naruebet Kuno	Nominated	
17th Komchadluek Awards	Best Leading Actor	Putthipong Assaratanakul	Won	
17th Komchadluek Awards	Popular Actor	Krit Amnuaydechkorn	Won	
17th Komchadluek Awards	Popular Drama/Series	I Told Sunset About You	Won	
12th Nataraja Awards	Best Online Drama/Series	I Told Sunset About You	Won	
12th Nataraja Awards	Best Original Screenplay for Online Drama Series	I Told Sunset About You	Won	
12th Nataraja Awards	Best Actor for Online Drama Series	Putthipong Assaratanakul	Won	
12th Nataraja Awards	Best Actor for Online Drama Series	Krit Amnuaydechkorn	Nominated	
12th Nataraja Awards	Drama Series of the Year	I Told Sunset About You	Won	
2020 Yniverse Awards	Best Series	I Told Sunset About You	Won	
2020 Yniverse Awards	Best Director	Naruebet Kuno	Won	
2020 Yniverse Awards	Best Main Actor	Putthipong Assaratanakul	Won	
2020 Yniverse Awards	Best Main Actor in a Partner Role	Krit Amnuaydechkorn	Won	
2020 Yniverse Awards	Best Co-Starring Actor	Pongpol Panyamit	Won	
2020 Yniverse Awards	Best Supporting Actor	Nat Kitcharit	Won	
2020 Yniverse Awards	Best Script	Naruebet Kuno, Arachaporn Pokinpakorn, Karakade Norasethaporn, Naron Cherdsoongnern	Won	
2020 Yniverse Awards	Best OST	"Can't Translate"	Won	
2021 Line TV Awards	Best Viral Scene	I Told Sunset About You	Won	
2021 Line TV Awards	Best Kiss Scene	I Told Sunset About You	Won	
2021 Line TV Awards	Best Couple	"Teh - Oh-aew"	Won	
2021 Line TV Awards	Best Rising Star	Pongpol Panyamit	Nominated	
2021 Line TV Awards	Best Thai Song	"Skyline"	Won	
Seoul International Drama Awards 2021	International Invitation - International Drama of the Year	I Told Sunset About You	Won	
Seoul International Drama Awards 2021	International Invitation - Asian Star Prize	Krit Amnuaydechkorn	Won	
18th Komchadluek Awards	Popular Thai Drama/Series	I Promised You The Moon	Nominated	
18th Komchadluek Awards	Popular Male Actor	Krit Amnuaydechkorn	Won	
18th Komchadluek Awards	Popular Couple	Putthipong Assaratanakul and Krit Amnuaydechkorn	Won	
Seoul International Drama Awards 2022	International Invitation - Asian Star Prize (Thailand)	Krit Amnuaydechkorn	Won	
13th Nataraja Awards	Drama Series of the Year	I Promised You The Moon	Won	
13th Nataraja Awards	Best Online Drama/Series	I Promised You The Moon	Won	
13th Nataraja Awards	Best Original Screenplay for Online Drama Series	I Promised You The Moon	Won	
13th Nataraja Awards	Best Actor for Online Drama Series	Putthipong Assaratanakul	Won	
13th Nataraja Awards	Best Actor for Online Drama Series	Krit Amnuaydechkorn	Nominated	
13th Nataraja Awards	Best Supporting Actor for Online Drama Series	Oabnithi Wiwattanawarang	Won	
