= The Red Envelope =

- Thai theatrical release poster
- Directed by: Chayanop Boonprakob
- Written by: Chayanop Boonprakob; Thamsatid Charoenrittichai; Chantavit Dhanasevi; Weawwan Hongvivatana
- Produced by: Banjong Pisanthanakun
- Starring: Putthipong Assaratanakul; Krit Amnuaydechkorn
- Cinematography: Kittiwat Semarat
- Edited by: Phiradon Witcharonasorn
- Production companies: Billkin Entertainment; GDH 559; PP Krit Entertainment
- Release date: March 20, 2025
- Running time: 128 minutes
- Country: Thailand
- Language: Thai
- Box office: ฿62.95 million (Bangkok, Metropolitan & Chiang Mai) ฿103.35 million (nationwide)

The Red Envelope (Thai: ซองแดงแต่งผี, RTGS: Sxng dæng tæng phi, lit. 'Red envelope for ghosts') is a 2025 Thai supernatural comedy mystery film co-written and directed by Chayanop Boonprakob and starring Putthipong Assaratanakul and Krit Amnuaydechkorn. It is a remake of the 2022 Taiwanese film Marry My Dead Body. A GDH 559 production along with Billkin Entertainment and PP Krit Entertainment.

== Synopsis ==
Men is a small-time thief turned cop who accidentally picks up a mysterious red envelope and discovers it's an ancient ritual requiring him to marry a corpse, or else be doomed for the rest of his life. But what really shocks a straight man like Men is that the corpse he marries is also a man.

== Cast ==
- Putthipong Assaratanakul as Menn
- Krit Amnuaydechkorn as Titi
- Arachaporn Pokinpakorn as Goi
- Piyamas Monyakul as Amah
- Jaturong Phonboon as Big Joe
- Rusameekae Fagerlund as Rambo
- Tanawat Cheawaram as Matoom

== Release ==
The film was released on March 20, 2025, in Thai theaters. It was also released on April 9, 2025, in Philippine theaters, on April 11, 2025, in Vietnamese theaters, on April 17, 2025, in Myanmar theaters, on April 24, 2025, in Singaporean, Indonesian, Hongkongers and Macanese theaters, and on May 15, 2025, in Australian and New Zealanders theaters.

== Box-office ==
The film grossed over 100 million baht, becoming the first Thai film to break triple figures at the box office in 2025.

== Accolades ==
Year	Award / Festival	Category	Recipient	Result	Ref.
2025	49th Hong Kong International Film Festival	Audience Choice Award	The Red Envelope	Won	
