= My Ambulance =

2019 Thai television series

- Official series poster
- รักฉุดใจนายฉุกเฉิน
- Genre: Fantasy; Romance; Comedy
- Screenplay by: Naruebet Kuno; Pattaranat Phiboonsawat; Nanthanat Thakatkul; Arachaporn Pokinpakorn
- Directed by: Naruebet Kuno
- Starring: Davika Hoorne; Sunny Suwanmethanont; Wongravee Nateetorn
- Theme music composer: Mello Tunes
- Opening theme: My Ambulance by Paris Intarakomalyasut & Nichaphat Chatchaipholrat
- Ending theme: Heartbeat by Mai Davika
- Country of origin: Thailand
- Original language: Thai
- No. of episodes: 16

Production
- Producers: Songyos Sugmakanan; Kriangkrai Vachiratamporn; Suwimon Techasupinan
- Production location: Thailand
- Running time: 45 minutes
- Production companies: The One Enterprise; Nadao Bangkok

Original release
- Network: One31; LINE TV; Dimsum Asia
- Release: September 6 – October 26, 2019

My Ambulance (Thai: รักฉุดใจนายฉุกเฉิน; RTGS: Rak Chut Jai Nai Chukchoen) is a 2019 Thai romantic-comedy television series starring Davika Hoorne, Sunny Suwanmethanont, and Wongravee Nateetorn (Sky). It was aired on One31 from September 6 to October 26, 2019 and consisted of 16 episodes. The series was produced by Nadao Bangkok and directed by Naruebet Kuno.

== Plot ==
Peng (Sunny Suwanmethanont), an emergency center resident, and Tantawan (Davika Hoorne) have been in love for 15 years, mainly because they own a magical power between them which make Peng able to go to Tantawan when she calls him. One day, they got into a traffic accident and Tantawan is seriously injured. When she woke up, she lost her memory of the accident. Unbeknownst to her, the truth about the accident is hidden by Peng and all people around her.
A young and heart-warming intern, Chalarm (Wongravee Nateetorn) appeared in her life and reminded her of the same feeling she once had for Peng. While her magical power with Peng has been weakening, Chalarm has started to have the magical power leading to her confusion - who is the one for her. During this time, Peng also met a new girl named Bamee (Kanyawee Songmuang), who has a crush on Peng and came to the hospital as an ambulance driver to get closer to him.

== Cast and characters ==
=== Main ===
- Davika Hoorne (Mai) as Tantawan
  - Sawanya Paisarnpayak as young Tantawan (Ep. 1, 3 & 6)
- Sunny Suwanmethanont as Peng
  - Vachirawit Chivaaree (Bright) as young Peng (Ep. 1, 3)
- Wongravee Nateetorn (Sky) as Chalarm

=== Supporting ===
- Kanyawee Songmuang (Thanaerng) as Bamee
- Putthipong Assaratanakul (Billkin) as Tao
- Krit Amnuaydechkorn (PP) as Thiukhao (Tantawan's brother)
- Ponlawit Ketprapakorn (Pond) as Wan
- Napat Chokejindachai (Toptap) as Lek
- Paweenut Panakorn (Pookie) as Tak
- Thiti Mahayotaruk (Bank) as Tai
- Machida Sutthikulphanich (Maki) as Khim (Tai's sister)

=== Guest ===
- Lukkhana Siriwong (Bum) as Peng's mother
- Nitmon Ladapornphiphan as girl with heart disease
- Buppa Suttisanon as Tantawan's mother
- Nophand Boonyai (On) as Tantawan's father
- Varit Hongsananda (Pao) as Chao
- Banjong Pisanthanakun (Tong) as psychiatrist

== Soundtrack ==
- Ice Paris & Pearwah Nichaphat - Rak Tit Siren (Love Siren)
- Billkin - You Are My Everything
- Sunny Suwanmethanont & Sky Wongravee - Love Message
- Mai Davika - Tok Lum Rak (Heartbeat)
- Thanaerng Kanyawee - Mai Penrai Rok (It's OK)
- Ice Paris - Rak Tit Siren (Love Siren) (Midnight Version)
- Friday - Nao Ni (This Winter)
- Scrubb - Khao Kan Di (Well)
- Buachompoo Sahavat - Love Message

== Awards and nominations ==
Association	Award	Nominee	Result	Reference
16th Komchadluek Awards	Best Actor	Sunny Suwanmethanont	Nominated	
16th Komchadluek Awards	Best Supporting Actor	Thiti Mahayotaruk	Nominated	
11th Nataraj Awards	Best TV Drama	My Ambulance	Nominated	
11th Nataraj Awards	Best Team Ensemble	My Ambulance	Nominated	
11th Nataraj Awards	Best Director	Naruebet Kuno	Nominated	
11th Nataraj Awards	Best Actress	Davika Hoorne	Nominated	
11th Nataraj Awards	Best Actor	Sunny Suwanmethanont	Nominated	
11th Nataraj Awards	Best Supporting Actor	Thiti Mahayotaruk	Nominated	
11th Nataraj Awards	Best Drama Soundtrack	Rak Tit Siren (Love Siren)	Nominated	
2020 Line TV Awards	Best Song	Rak Tit Siren (Love Siren)	Won	
2020 Line TV Awards	Best Couple	Putthipong Assaratanakul, Krit Amnuaydechkorn	Nominated	
2020 Line TV Awards	Best Kiss Scene	Sunny Suwanmethanont, Davika Hoorne	Nominated	
2020 Line TV Awards	Best Viral Scene	My Ambulance	Nominated	
2020 Line TV Awards	Most Followers of the Year	My Ambulance	Won	
JOOX Thailand Music Awards	Collaboration of the Year	Rak Tit Siren (Love Siren)	Won	
JOOX Thailand Music Awards	Pop Song of the Year	Rak Tit Siren (Love Siren)	Won	
The Guitar Mag Awards 2020	Single Hits of the Year	Rak Tit Siren (Love Siren)	Won	
Kazz Awards 2020	2019 Hottest Song of the Year	Rak Tit Siren (Love Siren)	Won	
LINE Thailand People's Choice Awards 2020	Melody of the Year	Rak Tit Siren (Love Siren)	Won	
