= Putthipong Assaratanakul =

Thai actor and singer (born 1999)

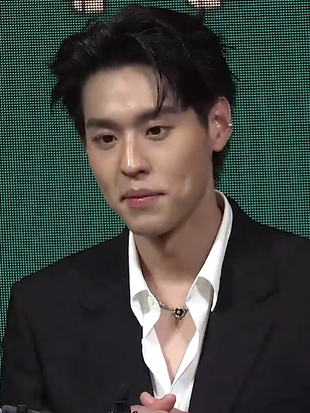
- Billkin in 2024
- Born: 8 October 1999 (age 27); Bangkok, Thailand
- Other name: Billkin
- Occupations: Artist; singer; actor
- Years active: 2016–present
- Agent: Billkin Entertainment
- Height: 1.78 m (5 ft 10 in)
- Musical career
- Genres: Pop; T-pop
- Instrument: Vocals
- Label: Billkin Entertainment

Putthipong Assaratanakul (Thai: พุฒิพงศ์ อัสสรัตนกุล; born 8 October 1999), nicknamed Billkin (Thai: บิวกิ้น), is a Thai actor and singer. He is known for his roles as Tao in My Ambulance (2019), as Teh in I Told Sunset About You (2020) and I Promised You the Moon (2021), and as M in How to Make Millions Before Grandma Dies (2024).

== Early life and education ==
Putthipong was born in Bangkok, Thailand. His father initially considered giving him the nickname "Eeyore" (he has elder siblings named Mickey and Winnie) but later changed it to "Bill". One day, his four-year-old brother called him "Billkin", and the name was adopted. He completed his secondary education at Saint Gabriel's College. He is studying business administration (international program), major in marketing at the Faculty of Commerce and Accountancy at Thammasat University, having enrolled in 2018. He graduated with a degree in this faculty on the 27 November 2023. He is currently studying at University College London for his master in Entrepreneurship.

== Career ==
Putthipong started in the entertainment industry as an actor under Nadao Bangkok. He rose to popularity with his role as Doctor Tao in My Ambulance (2019) where he was paired with Krit Amnuaydechkorn (PP), who played the role of Tewkao. With the conclusion of the said television series in October 2019, plans were made to produce a boys' love television series where Putthipong and Krit will play as lead actors. The project, with a working title of "BKPP: The Series", was announced in February 2020 and was supposed to premiere in July 2020. Due to government restrictions placed amidst the COVID-19 pandemic, the series' production was delayed with its release pushed to October 2020 under the title of I Told Sunset About You. Putthipong played the role of Teh, a high-school student from Phuket and a childhood friend of Krit's character Oh-aew. The series returned for a second season in May 2021 entitled I Promised You the Moon.

Aside from acting, he also sang "You Are My Everything", the official soundtrack of My Ambulance. This later led him to release his first single under Nadao Music entitled "Hug in Mind" which featured his fellow Nadao Bangkok artist JAYLERR. He also sang for the original soundtrack of I Told Sunset About You and I Promised You The Moon. His second single, "IXO" and its music video was released on 9 September 2021. The single is described as a mix of soul and city pop genres. Putthipong was involved from the conceptualization stage to the writing of the song's chorus part.

== Filmography ==
=== Film ===
Year	Title	Role	Notes	Ref.
2019	Brother of the Year	Ball	Guest role	
2024	How to Make Millions Before Grandma Dies	M	Main role	
2025	The Red Envelope	Menn	Main role	

=== Television ===
Year	Title	Role	Notes	Ref.
2017	Please... Siang Riak Winyan	Tle	Support role	
2019	My Ambulance	Tao	Support role	
2019	One Year	Porsche	Support role	
2020	I Told Sunset About You	Teh	Main role	
2021	I Promised You the Moon	Teh	Main role	

=== Music video appearances ===
Year	Title	Singer	Ref(s)
2020	"โคตรพิเศษ"	PP Krit	
2022	"เท่าไหร่ก็ไม่พอ"	Bell Supol	

== Discography ==
=== As lead artist ===
Year	Song Title	Album	Ref.
2019	"You Are My Everything"	OST. My Ambulance	
2019	"I Love You ต่อจากนี้จะขอรัก...รักเธอต่อไป" (I Love You)	OST. My Ambulance	
2020	"กีดกัน" (Skyline)	OST. I Told Sunset About You	
2020	"แปลไม่ออก" (Can't Translate)	OST. I Told Sunset About You	
2020	"โคตรพิเศษ" (Freaking Special)	OST. I Told Sunset About You	
2021	"หลอกกันทั้งนั้น" (Fake News)	OST. I Promised You the Moon	
2021	"I ไม่ O" (IXO)	Single	
2021	"เก็บไว้ตลอดไป" (Once & Forever)	Single	
2022	"ชอบตัวเองตอนอยู่กับเธอ" (I Like Us)	EP Love's Apprentice	
2022	"กลับมาคบกันเถอะ" (Please Please)	EP Love's Apprentice	
2022	"Mr. Everything"	EP Love's Apprentice	
2023	"ยิ้มทั้งน้ำตา" (Always)	EP Love's Apprentice	
2023	"การเดินทางที่สวยงาม" (A Beautiful Ride)	EP Love's Apprentice	
2023	Daily Magic	EP Grow With The Flow	
2024	"ก้าวก่าย" (Still on Your Line)	EP Grow With The Flow	
2024	"สวยงามเสมอ" (Ever-Forever)	OST. How To Make Millions Before Grandma Dies	
2024	Golden Hour	EP Grow With The Flow	
2024	"ยิ่งดุยิ่งชอบ" (Bossy Baby)	EP Grow With The Flow	
2025	"ตัวโดน" (Always Me)	EP Grow With The Flow	
2025	"รักแรกพบ" (Knock Knock)	OST. ซองแดงแต่งผี (The Red Envelope)	
2025	See You Somewhere	OST. ซองแดงแต่งผี (The Red Envelope)	
2025	"นับหนึ่ง" (From Now On)	EP Grow With The Flow	
2025	"ใครจะรู้" (Silent Blue)	EP Grow With The Flow	
2025	Grow With The Flow	EP Grow With The Flow	

=== As collaborating artist ===
Year	Song Title	Album	Ref.
2017	"ไม่กลัว" (Mai Glua) (with Tytan Teepprasan)	OST. Please... Seiyng Reiyk Wiyyan	
2020	"กอดในใจ" (Hug in Mind) (with JAYLERR)	Single	
2021	"มันดีเลย" (with PEARWAH, Peck Palitchoke, PP Krit)	Single	
2021	"รู้งี้เป็นแฟนกันตั้งนานแล้ว" (Safe Zone) (with PP Krit)	OST. I Promised You the Moon	
2021	"คิดไม่ออก" (with TangBadVoice)	Single	
2021	"ทะเลสีดำ" (The Black Sea) (with PP Krit)	OST. I Promised You the Moon	
2021	"ไม่ปล่อยมือ" (Coming of Age) (with PP Krit)	OST. I Promised You the Moon	
2022	"Give Me Your Forever" (with Zack Tabudlo)	BYE 2021 version	
2022	"แลกเลยปะ" (Hoo Whee Hoo) (with PP Krit, 4EVE)	Single	
2022	"Self Love" (with F.Hero, Tiger JK, Yoon Mi-rae )	Single	
2023	"กันและกัน" (with Zom Marie)	OST. You & Me & Me	
2024	"ยอม" (Surrender) (with PP Krit)	Single	
2025	"สัมภเวซี้"(GFF Ghost Friend Forever) (with PP Krit)	OST. ซองแดงแต่งผี (The Red Envelope)	
2025	I'm ok // not ok (with BOYdPOD)	Single	
2025	Oh It's You (with Bird Thongchai)	Single	
2025	"ขอโทษได้ไหม" (If Only) (with Nont Tanont)	EP Mono / Spectrum	

== Awards and nominations ==
Year	Award	Category	Nominated work	Result	Refs.
2020	Maya Awards	Best Official Soundtrack	"You Are My Everything"	Nominated	
2020	The 5th Weibo TV Series Awards	Most Popular Foreign Actor	"แปลรักฉันด้วยใจเธอ" (I Told Sunset About You)	Nominated	
2021	Yniverse Awards 2020	Best Official Soundtrack	"แปลไม่ออก" ("Can't Translate")	Won	
2021	Yniverse Awards 2020	Best Actor	"แปลรักฉันด้วยใจเธอ" (I Told Sunset About You)	Won	
2021	17th Komchadluek Awards	Best Leading Actor	"แปลรักฉันด้วยใจเธอ" (I Told Sunset About You)	Won	
2021	17th Komchadluek Awards	Popular Singer Award	"แปลรักฉันด้วยใจเธอ" (I Told Sunset About You)	Won	
2021	2021 Joox Thailand Music Awards	New Artist of the Year		Won	
2021	2021 Line TV Awards	Best Thai Song	"กีดกัน" ("Skyline")	Won	
2021	2021 Line TV Awards	Best Kiss Scene (shared with Krit Amnuaydechkorn)	"แปลรักฉันด้วยใจเธอ" (I Told Sunset About You)	Won	
2021	2021 Line TV Awards	Best Couple (shared with Krit Amnuaydechkorn)	"แปลรักฉันด้วยใจเธอ" (I Told Sunset About You)	Won	
2021	12th Nataraja Awards	Best Actor for Online Drama Series	"แปลรักฉันด้วยใจเธอ" (I Told Sunset About You)	Won	
2021	1st Siam Series Awards	Popular Soundtrack	"กีดกัน" ("Skyline")	Won	
2021	1st Siam Series Awards	Best Scene (shared with Krit Amnuaydechkorn)	"แปลรักฉันด้วยใจเธอ" (I Told Sunset About You)	Won	
2021	1st Siam Series Awards	Popular Couple (shared with Krit Amnuaydechkorn)	"แปลรักฉันด้วยใจเธอ" (I Told Sunset About You)	Nominated	
2021	Seoul International Drama Awards 2021	Asian Drama Prize		Nominated	
2021	15th Kazz Awards	Popular Male Artist Award		Nominated	
2021	15th Kazz Awards	Male Teenage of the Year		Nominated	
2021	15th Kazz Awards	Male Rising Star		Won	
2021	15th Kazz Awards	Best Scene (shared with Krit Amnuaydechkorn)	"แปลรักฉันด้วยใจเธอ" (I Told Sunset About You)	Nominated	
2021	Maya Awards	Charming boy		Nominated	
2021	Maya Awards	Best Couple (shared with Krit Amnuaydechkorn)	"แปลรักฉันด้วยใจเธอ" (I Told Sunset About You)	Nominated	
2021	Maya Awards	Best Official Soundtrack	"กีดกัน" (Skyline)	Nominated	
2021	Maya Awards	Male Rising Star		Nominated	
2021	Maya Awards	Solo Artist		Nominated	
2021	3nd Zoomdara Awards	Popular Couple (shared with Krit Amnuaydechkorn)	"แปลรักฉันด้วยใจเธอ" (I Told Sunset About You)	Nominated	
2021	3nd Zoomdara Awards	Zoomdara of the Year		Nominated	
2021	TrueID Awards 2021	Male Singer of the Year		Nominated	
2022	Maya Entertain Awards 2022	Male Rising Star of the Year		Nominated	
2022	Maya Entertain Awards 2022	Couple of the year (shared with Krit Amnuaydechkorn)		Nominated	
2022	Maya Entertain Awards 2022	Male artist of the Year		Nominated	
2022	Maya Entertain Awards 2022	Popular vote of Maya		Nominated	
2022	18th Komchadluek Awards	Popular Singer Award		Won	
2022	18th Komchadluek Awards	Popular Actor		Nominated	
2022	18th Komchadluek Awards	Popular Couple		Won	
2022	16th Kazz Awards	Popular Male Teenage		Nominated	
2022	13th Nataraja Awards	Best Actor for Online Drama Series	"แปลรักฉันด้วยใจเธอ Part 2” (I Promised You the Moon)	Won	
2022	2022 Asia Artist Awards (AAA)	AAA Asia Celebrity		Won	
2022	Siamrath online award 2021	Popular Couple (shared with Krit Amnuaydechkorn)		Won	
2022	2022 Joox Thailand Music Awards	Social Thai Artist of the year		Nominated	
2022	2022 Joox Thailand Music Awards	Top Rooms of the Year		Nominated	
2022	2022 Joox Thailand Music Awards	Song of the Year		Nominated	
2023	TOTY MUSIC AWARDS 2022	Best Music of the Year	"ชอบตัวเองตอนอยู่กับเธอ"(I Like Us)	Won	
2023	Line Melody Music Awards 2022	Melody of the Year	"ชอบตัวเองตอนอยู่กับเธอ" (I Like Us)	Won	
2023	The Guitar Mag Awards 2023	Star Single Hits of The Year		Won	
2023	TikTok Awards Thailand 2023	Artist of the Year		Won	
2024	Line Melody Music Awards 2023	Melody of the Year	"Mr. Everything"	Won	
2024	TOTY MUSIC AWARDS 2023	Best Music of the Year (Male Artist)	"ยิ้มทั้งน้ำตา" (Always)	Won	
2024	Marie Claire Asia Star Award 2024	Rising Star Award	"หลานม่า" (How to Make Millions Before Grandma Dies)	Won	
2024	Asia Pacific Film Festival	Best Leading Actor	"หลานม่า" (How to Make Millions Before Grandma Dies)	Won	
2025	Line Melody Music Awards 2024	Silver Melody Awards	"ชอบตัวเองตอนอยู่กับเธอ"(I Like Us)	Won	
2025	Line Melody Music Awards 2024	Best Male Artist 2024		Won	
2025	Thailand Box Office Awards 2024	Best Leading Actor of The Year	"หลานม่า" (How to Make Millions Before Grandma Dies)	Won	
2025	TOTY MUSIC AWARDS 2024	POPular OST. of The Year	"สวยงามเสมอ" (Ever-Forever)	Won	
2025	Thai Film Director Awards 14	Best Actor	"หลานม่า" (How to Make Milloins Before Grandma Dies)	Won	
2025	The Viral Hits Awards 2024	Best Male Solo Artist of the Year		Won	
2025	Weibo Gala 2025	Most Influential Male Singer Overseas		Won	
2025	Lifestyle Asia 50 ICONS	Global Icons		Won	
2025	TIMA International Music Awards	Best International Artist Of The Year		Won	
2025	FEED X KHAOSOD AWARDS 2025	Most Popular Song	"เพลงรักแรกพบ" (Knock Knock)	Won	
2025	FEED X KHAOSOD AWARDS 2025	Most Popular Artist		Won	
2025	FEED X KHAOSOD AWARDS 2025	Best Original Sound Track of The Year	"เพลงรักแรกพบ" (Knock Knock)	Won	
2025	FEED X KHAOSOD AWARDS 2025	Best Actor of The Year (Film)	"ซองแดงแต่งผี" (The Red Envelope)	Won	
2025	33rd Suphannahong	Best Actor	"หลานม่า" (How to Make Millions Before Grandma Dies)	Won	
2025	JOOX Top Music Night 2025	JOOX Artist of the Year		Won	
2026	Thailand Box Office Awards 2025	OST of The Year	See You Somewhere	Won	
2026	The Guitar Mag Awards 2026	Best Male Artist of The Year		Won	
2026	TOTY MUSIC AWARDS 2025	Most Popular Original Soundtrack of The Year	See You Somewhere	Won	
2026	Line Melody Music Awards 2025	Black Melody	"นับหนึ่ง" (From Now On)	Won	
2026	Line Melody Music Awards 2025	Black Melody of The Year 2025	"นับหนึ่ง" (From Now On)	Won	
