= 2021 Line TV Awards =

Awarding ceremony given by LINE TV Thailand

4th LINE TV Awards
- Date: 5 August 2021
- Location: Bangkok, Thailand (Held virtually)
- Country: Thailand
- Presented by: LINE TV Thailand
- Most awards: GMMTV and Nadao Bangkok (4)
- Most nominations: I Told Sunset About You (5)
- Website: linetvawards.com

The 4th LINE TV Awards was an awarding ceremony presented by LINE TV Thailand giving recognition to the Thai online entertainment industry in the fields of music, television, and drama for their achievements in the year 2020.

The nominees were revealed on 21 June, while the online voting for most of the categories occurred from 21 June to 18 July. The award show was held on August 5 through virtual and with no in-person venue due to the COVID-19 pandemic. It was streamed through Line TV app and website.

== Awards ==
Winners are listed first and highlighted in bold:

=== Major awards ===
Best Dramatic Scene	Best Comedy Scene
**The Last Promise** **(One 31)**; In Her Shoes (Amarin TV 34); Mother (JSL Global Media); One Year (GDH 559); Until We Meet Again (Studio Wabi Sabi)	**Hollywood Game Night Thailand Season 3** **(Channel 3 HD)**; Lang Too Yen (Good Deal Entertainment); Six Scenes (Workpoint TV); Win 21 Ded Jai Ter (Leay Do Dee); YYY (Copy A Bangkok)
Best Viral Scene	Best Kiss Scene
**I Told Sunset About You** **(Nadao Bangkok)**; 10 Fight 10 Season 2 (Workpoint TV); The Gifted: Graduation (GMMTV); Toong Sanaeha (Channel 3); Who Are You? (GMMTV)	**I Told Sunset About You** **(Nadao Bangkok)**; My Husband in Law (Thong Entertainment); My Name is Busaba (One 31); Still 2gether (GMMTV); Until We Meet Again (Studio Wabi Sabi)
Best Couple	Best Rising Star
**Teh – Oh-aew from I Told Sunset About You** **(Nadao Bangkok)**; Dean – Pharm from Until We Meet Again (Studio Wabi Sabi); Fighter – Tutor from Why R U? (Mandee); Mark – Vee from En of Love: TOSSARA (Studio Wabi Sabi); Neua-Mek – Kwanma from Shadow of Love (Channel 3); Pailin – Sai from One Year (GDH 559); Saifah – Zon from Why R U?: SaifahZon Story (Mandee); Sarawat – Tine from 2gether (GMMTV)	**Win Metawin for 2gether: The Series** **(GMMTV)**; ALLY for How to Love (feat. GRAY) (411 Entertainment); MILLI for Hold On (YUPP!); Khunpol Pongpol for I Told Sunset About You (Nadao Bangkok); Yin Anan for En of Love: TOSSARA (Studio Wabi Sabi)
Best Thai Song
**"Skyline" by Billkin** **(Nadao Music)**; "I'm Not A Con-Heartist by BamBam (GMM Grammy); "Kan Goo" by Bright Vachirawit (GMMTV Records); "Enough" by First Anuwat (Believe Music); "Erase" by Ink Waruntorn (Boxx Music); "Hold On" by MILLI (YUPP!); "Nicotine" by Mirrr (Macrowave); "Melbourne" by Morvasu ft. TangBadVoice (What The Duck); "Happy Wife Happy Life" by MVL feat. F.HERO, MINDSET (Spicydisc); "Same Page?" by Tilly Birds (GMM Grammy)

=== Special awards ===
Series of the Year	Top Search Content of the Year
**2gether (GMMTV)**	**Pen Tor (One 31)**
Animation Program of the Year	Most Followers of the Year
**Demon Slayer: Kimetsu no Yaiba (Ufotable)**	**2gether (GMMTV)**
Most Hearted Content of the Year
**2gether (GMMTV)**

== Multiple nominations ==
Entries that received multiple nominations
Nominations	Show/Song	Production Company
5	I Told Sunset About You	Nadao Bangkok
4	2gether / Still 2gether	GMMTV
3	Until We Meet Again	Studio Wabi Sabi
2	En of Love: TOSSARA	Studio Wabi Sabi
2	Hold On	YUPP!
2	One Year	GDH 559
2	Why R U?	Mandee

Awards received by production company
Awards	Production Company
4	GMMTV
4	Nadao Bangkok
2	One 31
