= Marie Eugenie Le Lay =

Thai singer and songwriter (born 1992)

Marie Eugenie Le Lay Zom Marie
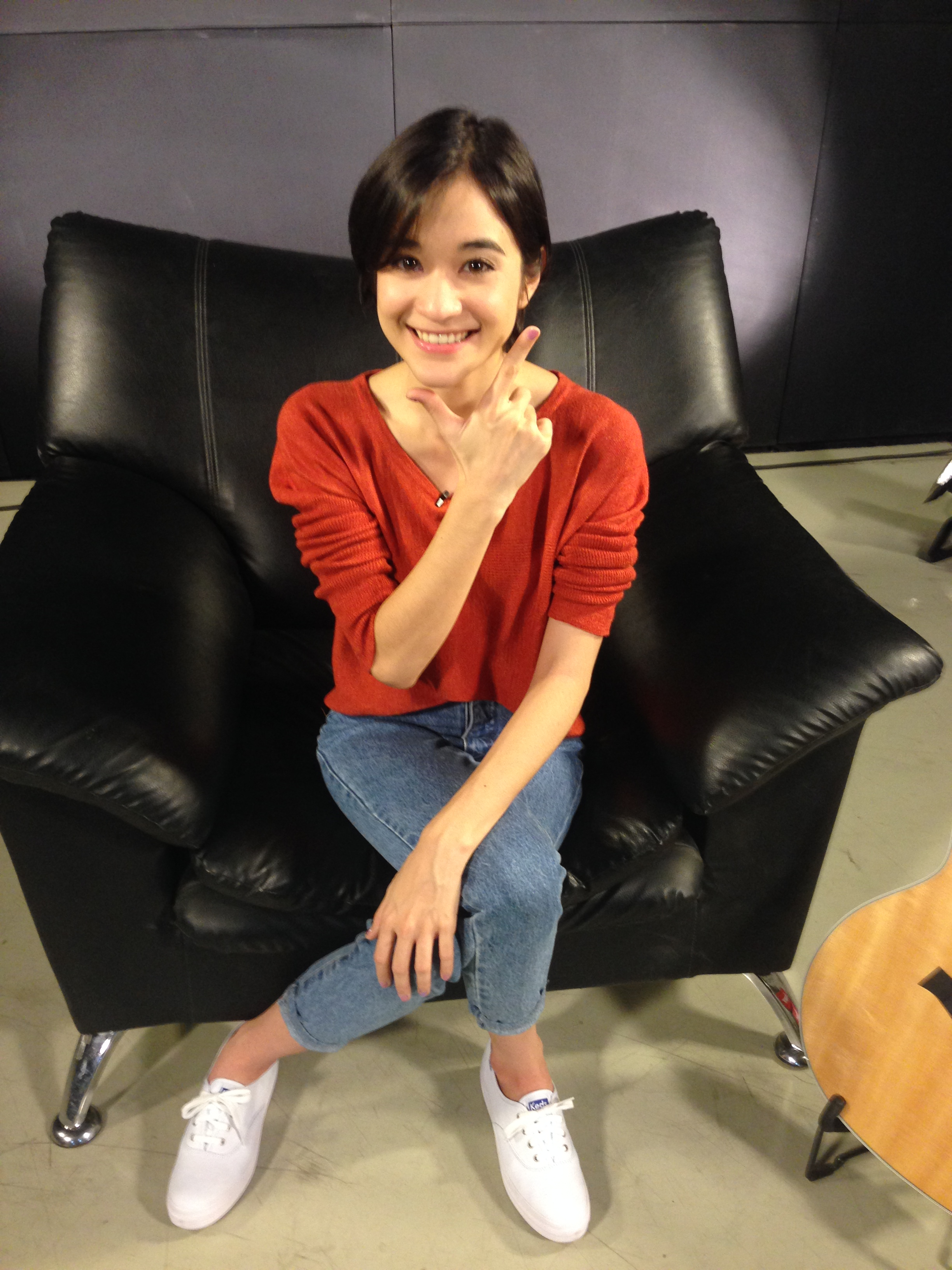
- Born: March 2, 1992 (age 34); France
- Citizenship: Thailand; France
- Education: Rangsit University
- Occupations: Singer; songwriter; actress; model
- Years active: 2008–present

Marie Eugenie Le Lay (Thai: มารี เออเจนี เลอเลย์, born 2 March 1992), known professionally as Zom Marie, is a half-French, half-Thai singer, songwriter, and actress.

Le Lay became known from the LG Starz Talent contest 2008 as one of the five winners. She used to be an artist under GMM Grammy. She has been a solo artist and a duo artist with "Atom Kritchanok Suaysod" under the name "Zom & Atom (Zom-Atom)". Later, she worked with Spicy Disc until 2022.

She graduated with a Bachelor of Communication Arts degree in Radio and Television Broadcasting from the Faculty of Communication Arts, Rangsit University, with first class honors.

On 19 August 2026, Channel 3 announced that Le Lay was one of the 10 competing artists selected to compete in Thailand’s Chosen One.

== Discography ==
=== Album ===
| Title | Year | Singles |
|---|---|---|
| LA LUNE | Released: May 7, 2022; Label: Spicy Disc; Formats: CD, tape, Vinyl | 1. หรือฉันคิดไปเอง (Kidding?); 2. ต้องเสียน้ำตาให้เธออีกกี่ครั้ง; 3. ติดอยู่ตรงนี้; 4. รางวัลปลอบใจ (feat. LazyLoxy); 5. ชิซุกะ (ถึง.. เดคิสุงิ); 6. รู้ได้แล้วมั้ย; 7. โลกอีกใบ (feat. Oat Pramote); 8. กล่องสุ่ม; 9. ยิ้มอ่อนและมองบน; 10. ถ้าบอกว่าไม่ไหว (เธอจะกลับมาไหม); 11. หากว่าเราไม่คิดถึงกัน (feat. The Parkinson); 12. How Was Your Day |
| Sweet And Sour | Released: October 4, 2024; Label: High Cloud; Formats: CD | 1. โหมดพระจันทร์; 2. เก่งแต่ลับหลัง (feat. Punch 4Eve); 3. อยู่คนเดียวกับเขา; 4. ดวงสุขเข้า ดวงเขาแทรก; 5. แม่งเอ๊ย (feat. MILLI); 6. เท่าไหร่ก็ไม่พอ (feat. KASAMA NOA); 7. ลองมั๊ย; 8. วันนี้เมื่อปีที่แล้ว (On This Day) (feat. Apiwat Ueathavornsuk); 9. ไม่ก้าวผ่าน; 10. มีความสุขแต่ก็เหงา |

=== E.P. ===
| Title | Year | Singles |
|---|---|---|
| My Favorite Songs | Released: 8 June 2021; Formats: CD, tape; Label : – | 1. เพราะ (Just Because); 2. วันที่เธอต้องไป; 3. ไม่เป็นไร; 4. ห่าง...คิดถึง; 5. ช่วงเวลา Feat. โอ ปวีย์; 6. กาแฟ |
| Handle with care (EP.) | Released: 15 February 2023; Formats: Piemium Pack (CD Package & Dise); Label : Spicy Disc | 1. Bubble; 2. Blush; 3. Still Talking; 4. Make Your Mind |

==== As featured artist ====
| Year | Title | Album |
|---|---|---|
| 2022 | "ไม่ได้ก็ไม่เอา" (Whatever) (Pixxie feat. Zom Marie) | Bloom |
| 2023 | "This is our life" (Violette Wautier and Zom Marie) | Your Girl |
