= Jackrin Kungwankiatichai =

Thai actor, model, and singer (born 2001)

- จักริน กังวานเกียรติชัย
- Born: 29 March 2001 (age 25); Bangkok, Thailand
- Other names: Jackie; Jack; JK
- Education: Bangkok Christian College; Srinakharinwirot University
- Occupations: Singer; actor; brand endorser
- Agents: 4NOLOGUE (2018-2024); OTH Entertainment (2024-2026); GMMTV (2026–present)
- Height: 180 cm (5 ft 11 in)
- Father: Kamol Kungwankiatichai
- Musical career
- Genres: Pop; T-pop
- Instruments: Vocals; guitar
- Years active: 2018–present
- Label: 4NOLOGUE
- Member of: TRINITY
- Formerly of: Nine by Nine

Jackrin Kungwankiatichai (Thai: จักริน กังวานเกียรติชัย, born 29 March 2001); nicknamed Jackie, (Thai: แจ๊คกี้) is a Thai singer, actor, and brand endorser. He was a member of the Thai boy group Nine by Nine, and is currently a member of TRINITY. He is the grand champion of the Thai singing competition The Mask Thai Literature.

== Early life and education ==
Jackrin was born on 29 March 2001. His father is Kamol Kungwankiatichai, and he has a younger sister named Chawunluk Kungwankiatichai, who is currently a trainee under 4NOLOGUE. He attended school at Bangkok Christian College and is currently studying Acting and Film Directing at the College of Social Communication Innovation, Srinakharinwirot University.

== Career ==
Jackrin began his music career in 2015 with the band Yellow Mustard. One of the band members is then-future Nine by Nine co-member Paris Intarakomalyasut. In 2017, Paris referred Jackrin to 4nologue CEO Anuwat Wichiennarat to audition for the label.

Jackrin signed with the label in 2018. From then to 2019, he became a member of the idol group Nine by Nine, a special one-year project by 4nologue in association with Nadao Bangkok. The group overall has released five songs and one mini-album, and embarked on a series of concert tours across Thailand.

As part of the project, Jackrin starred in two television series. His acting debut came with the 2018 TV series In Family We Trust where he received positive feedback for his performance as Thanat Suriyapairoj (Toei) and earned him acting nominations. He also performed a main role in the 2019 TV series Great Men Academy as Menn.

After the project ended in March 2019, 4nologue announced that it has formed a new boy group among the members of Nine by Nine. Jackrin, along with Teeradon Supapunpinyo, Sivakorn Adulsuttikul, and Lapat Ngamchaweng, debuted as TRINITY in September 2019. Jackrin is the main vocals of the group.

Jackrin was then paired with Sivakorn to appear as a duo in the 2019 TV singing competition show The Mask Thai Literature as Holvichai-Kavee where they received overall positive acclaim from the judges and its viewers. They were hailed as the season's champions by garnering the highest votes from the audience and viewers' text votes during the final round. They became the youngest and first and only duo to win in the show.

As a brand endorser, he collaborated with Thai rapper Milli for the song "Say It", as part of a promotion for an ice cream brand. Together with TRINITY co-member Sivakorn, they became the brand ambassador for the cosmetics brand retailer Kiehl's Thailand. As part of the promotional campaign, the duo has released "My Calendula" as a special single.

In 2022, he starred as the heir of a wealthy family on the Thai TV series You Are My Heartbeat. He also sang one of the series' original soundtrack.

Jackrin landed his first voice acting role in August 2022 for the Thai-dubbed version of One Piece Film: Red. He described the project as a "dream come true" as a childhood fan of its manga and anime versions.

On February 29, 2024, 4nologue announced Jackrin's contract with their agency has ended. On May 8, he established OTH Entertainment as its CEO to manage his solo career.

On June 1, 2026, OTH Entertainment announced it will be ceasing its role as Jackrin's artist management agency and added Jackrin is moving to GMMTV, which announced his welcome to the agency via a post.

== Filmography ==
=== Films ===
| Year | Title | Role | Notes |
|---|---|---|---|
| 2022 | One Piece Film: Red | Eboshi | Voice; Thai-dubbed version |
| 2025 | Art of the Devil: Beginning | Pirak | Main Role |
| 2026 | Panor 2 | Pirak | Main Role |

=== Television series ===
Key
| † | Denotes television productions that have not yet been released |

| Year | Title | Role | Notes |
|---|---|---|---|
| 2018 | In Family We Trust | Thanat Suriyapairoj (Toei) | Main role |
| 2019 | Great Men Academy | Arthit Rutrangsi (Menn) | Main role |
| 2022 | You Are My Heartbeat | Sasa Kukitcharoen (Din) | Main role |
| 2024 | Club Friday Hot Love Issue | Bank | Main role |
| 2024 | Petrichor | Rueangrit Witthayakittisak | Supporting role |
| 2025 | Jet Lag | Shark Yong Ge | Guest role |
| TBA | Arrest & Action † | Ai-ai | Supporting role |
| TBA | 52Hz † | Vee | Main role |

=== Web series ===
| Year | Title | Role | Notes |
|---|---|---|---|
| 2018 | Into the Light with 9x9 | Himself | Musical series |
| 2019 | The Journey of 9x9 Documentary | Himself | Line TV Original Documentary |
| 2019 | TRINITY: The Elementories | Himself | |

== Discography ==
| Year | Song title | Album | Ref. |
|---|---|---|---|
| 2018 | "NIGHT LIGHT" | NINE BY NINE (en Route) | |
| 2018 | "Hypnotize" | NINE BY NINE (en Route) | |
| 2019 | "The Lucky One" | NINE BY NINE (en Route) | |
| 2019 | "Shouldn't" | NINE BY NINE (en Route) | |
| 2019 | "Eternity" | NINE BY NINE (en Route) | |
| 2019 | "Haters Got Nothing" | TRINITY: The 1st Mini Album "The Elements" | |
| 2019 | "IOU" | TRINITY: The 1st Mini Album "The Elements" | |
| 2019 | "Jazzy" | TRINITY: The 1st Mini Album "The Elements" | |
| 2019 | "Hidden Track" | TRINITY: The 1st Mini Album "The Elements" | |
| 2020 | "5:59 (Five-Fifty Nine)" | Single | |
| 2020 | "YESTERDAY TODAY TOMORROW" with 4Nologue Trainees | Single | |
| 2021 | "Say It" with Milli | Single | |
| 2021 | "My Calendula" with Porsche TRINITY | Single | |
| 2021 | "Life Ain't Over" | TRINITY 1st Full Album: BREATH | |
| 2022 | "Nobody" | TRINITY 1st Full Album: BREATH | |
| 2022 | "Let's End This" | OST. You Are My Heartbeat | |
| 2022 | "I Don't Miss You" | TRINITY 1st Full Album: BREATH | |
| 2022 | "My Princess" | OST. My Sassy Princess 2022 | |
| 2022 | "Oh! Oh!" | TRINITY 1st Full Album: BREATH | |

== Awards and nominations ==
| Year | Nominated work | Category | Award | Result | Ref. |
|---|---|---|---|---|---|
| 2019 | In Family We Trust | Rising Male Actor of 2018 | 2018 Dara Daily Awards | Nominated | |
| 2019 | In Family We Trust | Best Team Ensemble | 10th Nataraj Awards | Won | |
| 2019 | In Family We Trust | Rising Star | 2019 Line TV Awards | Nominated | |
| 2019 | "Night Light" | Best Song (with Nine by Nine) | 2019 Line TV Awards | Nominated | |
| 2019 | Nine by Nine | Top Talk-About Artist | MThai Top Talk-About 2019 Awards | Won | |
| 2019 | Nine by Nine | Rising Star | Kazz Awards 2019 | Won | |
| 2020 | Jackrin Kungwankiatchai | Outstanding Children and Youth of the Year | 2020 National Children's Day | Won | |
| 2020 | Jackrin Kungwankiatchai | Male Teenage Star of the Year | Kazz Awards 2020 | Nominated | |
| 2020 | TRINITY | Trending Artist | Kazz Awards 2020 | Won | |
| 2020 | TRINITY | New Artist of the Year | 2020 Joox Thailand Music Awards | Nominated | |
| 2020 | TRINITY | Popular Thai International Artist | 16th Komchadluek Awards | Nominated | |
| 2021 | TRINITY | Youth Favorite Artist - Group | 2020-2021 Thailand Master Youth Awards | Won | |
| 2021 | TRINITY | Top Social Artist of the Year | 2021 Joox Thailand Music Awards | Nominated | |
| 2021 | In Family We Trust | Best Ensemble Cast | 2nd White TV Awards | Won | |
| 2021 | TRINITY | Favorite Group Artist | Maya Awards 2021 | Nominated | |
| 2021 | TRINITY | Trending Artist | Kazz Awards 2021 | Nominated | |
| 2022 | You Are My Heartbeat | Male Rising Star — Romantic Comedy | 3rd Mani Mekhala Awards | Won | |
