= Lapat Ngamchaweng =

Thai actor, model and singer (born 1998)

- ลภัส งามเชวง
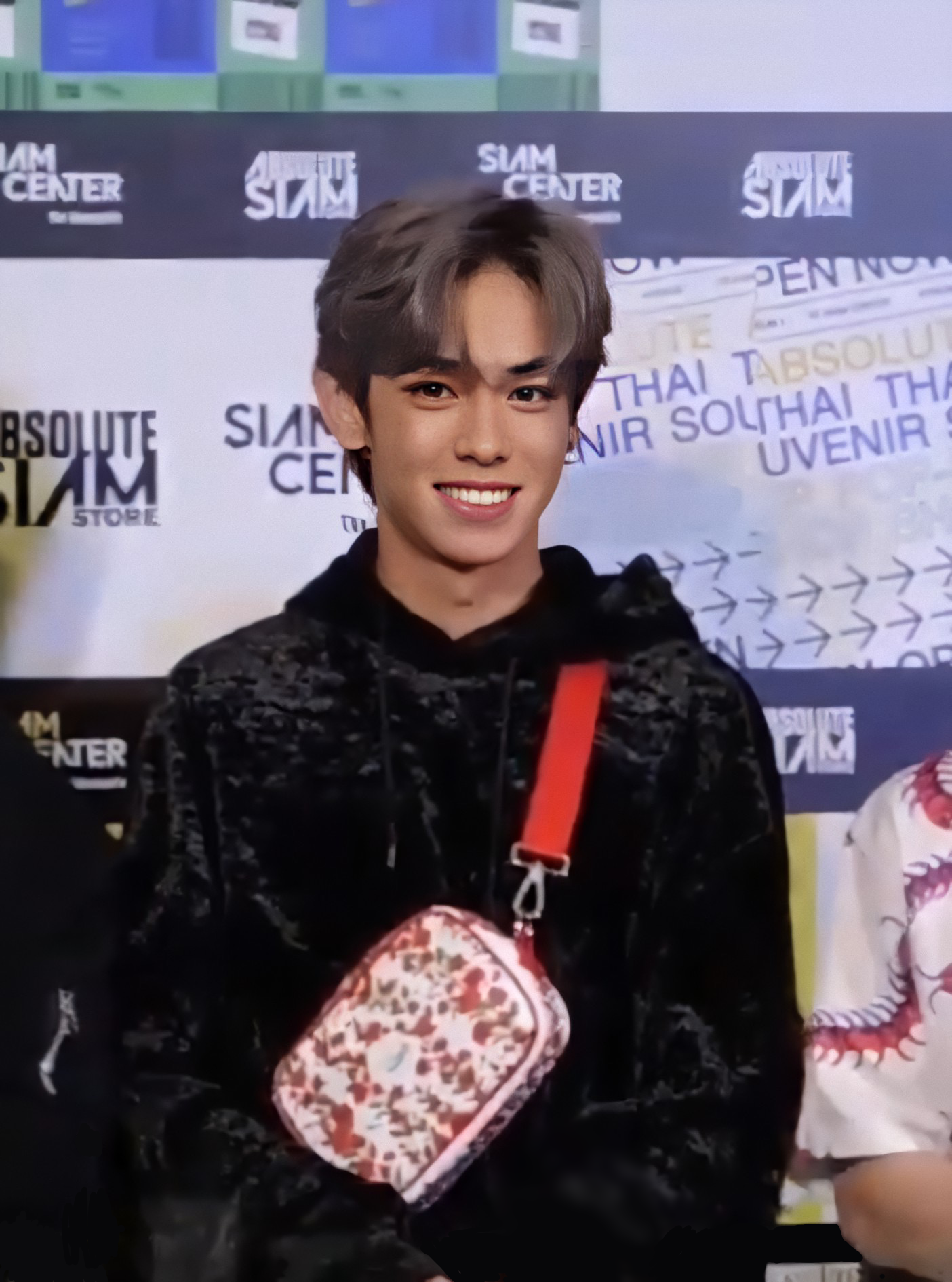
- Lapat in 2019
- Born: 24 November 1998 (age 27); Bangkok, Thailand
- Other names: Third; 3RD
- Education: New Sathorn International School; Chulalongkorn University
- Occupations: Singer; actor; brand endorser
- Years active: 2012–present
- Agents: Kamikaze (2012–2017); 4NOLOGUE (2018–2023); GMMTV (2026–present)
- Height: 1.8 m (5 ft 11 in)
- Musical career
- Genres: Pop; T-pop
- Instrument: Vocals
- Years active: 2013–present
- Labels: Kamikaze; 4NOLOGUE
- Member of: TRINITY
- Formerly of: Nine by Nine

Lapat Ngamchaweng (Thai: ลภัส งามเชวง, RTGS: Laphat Nganchaweng; born 24 November 1998), nicknamed Third (Thai: เติร์ด), is a Thai singer and actor. He was a former member of Nine by Nine. He is currently a member of the Thai boy group TRINITY.

== Early life and education ==
Lapat was born on 24 November 1998 in Bangkok, Thailand. His mother is Ketsara Limpananon. He is the youngest of three siblings, having two older sisters named Larisa Ngamchaweng (Lyly) and Larisara Ngamchaweng (Biba). He attended New Sathorn International School (the same school as singer Mew MEYOU, NistA and NistY from PRINCESS KILL, Miss Universe Pathum Thani 2025 Ploy Amandine, and content creator Mintchyy) and graduated from the Faculty of Communication Arts at Chulalongkorn University in 2020.

== Career ==
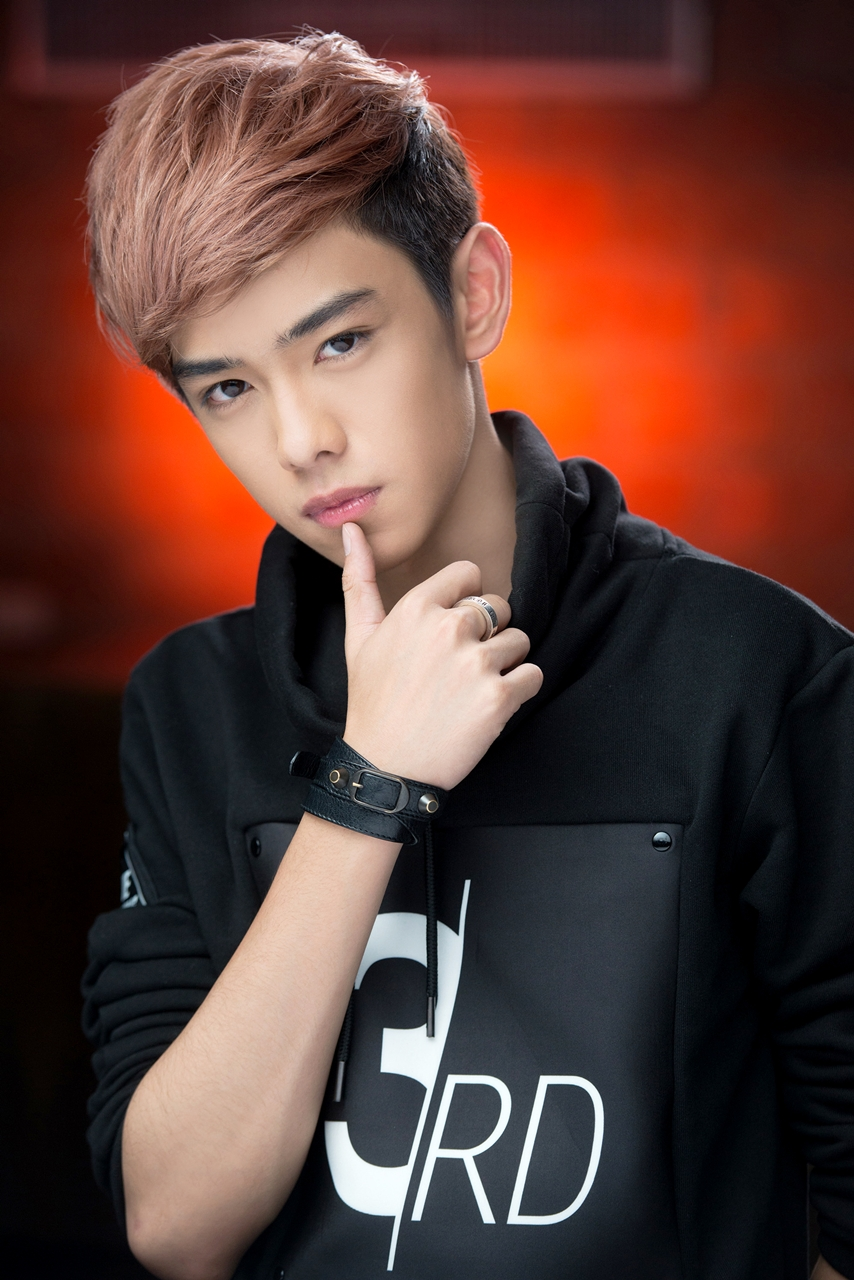
Lapat in 2016 as Third Kamikaze

Lapat became interested in acting at an early age. He first appeared in a 2012 Thai remake of Romeo and Juliet, playing the child lead actor. But he chose to pursue his singing career as he signed under the record label Kamikaze in 2013.

He released his debut single "Reminder" as Third Kamikaze on 27 August 2014. The music video has earned 341 million views on YouTube as of October 2022, making it the most-watched video of the label on the platform to date, and the 29th most viewed YouTube video in Thailand. Due to its success, it is deemed as a modern T-pop hit. He frequently collaborated with other Kamikaze artists for singles such as "Following" and "Hidden Love".

Lapat starred in a short film entitled 5 Degrees 37 Minutes (2016), a film honoring King Bhumibol Adulyadej. He played the role of Kla in the segment "The Brave Things".

His fifth single "Love Warning" was released in January 2016. Its music video became one of the most-watched videos of Kamikaze on Youtube, with over 263 million views as of February 2025. Lapat's sixth and last single with the label is "Stay", released on 9 March 2017 and became one of the soundtracks of the mini-series 21 Days, I Love You (2017), in which he starred with other Kamikaze artists. He stayed with the label until its closure in November 2017.

Lapat signed under 4NOLOGUE in 2018 where he became a member of the group Nine by Nine. As part of the project, he starred in two TV series entitled In Family We Trust (2018), playing the role of "Tao" and in Great Men Academy (2019) as "Nuclear".

After the project, he debuted as one of the members of TRINITY in 2019 along with former Nine by Nine co-members Teeradon Supapunpinyo, Sivakorn Adulsuttikul, and Jackrin Kungwankiatichai. He also appeared in the ninth season of The Mask Singer Thailand as Firework Mask.

Lapat's major film debut came with Mother Gamer (2020), where he starred as an e-sports player named "Kobsak". He received positive response for his performance and earned him Best Actor nominations at the 17th Komchadluek Awards and 11th Thai Film Directors Association.

He played the main role in the 2022 Thai TV series To My Puzzle Pieces as "Key".

On 16 October 2022, Lapat performed as a special guest during the Kamikaze Party 2022, where he performed his solo singles "Reminder" and "Love Warning".

On 15 December 2023, he published a statement in which he announced that he chose not to renew his expired contract with his agency 4NOLOGUE. Thus ending his long career with the agency. He also announced that he will continue to work as a TRINITY member under the consideration between the company and himself as an individual artist as deemed appropriate.

== Filmography ==
=== Film ===
Year	Title	Role	Notes
2012	Romeo and Juliet (Thai remake)	Romeo	Main
2016	5 Degrees 37 Minutes	Kla	Short film
2020	Mother Gamer	Kobsak	Main

=== Television ===
Key
†	Denotes television productions that have not yet been released

Year	Title	Role	Notes
2018	In Family We Trust	Wichaya Suriyapairoj (Tao)	Main
2019	Great Men Academy	Nuclear	Main
2022	To My Puzzle Pieces	Key	Main
TBA	Fake Boss, Real Boyfriend †	Tanil Ngamtai	Main

=== Web series ===
Year	Title	Role	Notes
2017	21 Days, I Love You	Rain	Main
2018	Into the Light with 9x9	Himself	Musical series
2019	The Journey of 9x9 Documentary	Himself	Line TV Original Documentary
2019	TRINITY: The Elementories	Himself	

== Discography ==
Year	Song	Album	Agency
2014	"Reminder"	Single	KAMIKAZE
2014	"Following" as featured artist	Single	KAMIKAZE
2015	"Just One Word"	Single	KAMIKAZE
2015	"Hidden Love" with Marc Kamikaze	Single	KAMIKAZE
2016	"Love Warning"	Single	KAMIKAZE
2017	"Stay"	Single	KAMIKAZE
2018	"NIGHT LIGHT"	NINE BY NINE (en Route)	4NOLOGUE
2018	"Hypnotize"	NINE BY NINE (en Route)	4NOLOGUE
2019	"The Lucky One"	NINE BY NINE (en Route)	4NOLOGUE
2019	"Shouldn't"	NINE BY NINE (en Route)	4NOLOGUE
2019	"Eternity"	NINE BY NINE (en Route)	4NOLOGUE
2019	"Haters Got Nothing"	TRINITY: The 1st Mini Album "The Elements"	4NOLOGUE
2019	"IOU"	TRINITY: The 1st Mini Album "The Elements"	4NOLOGUE
2019	"Jazzy"	TRINITY: The 1st Mini Album "The Elements"	4NOLOGUE
2019	"Hidden Track"	TRINITY: The 1st Mini Album "The Elements"	4NOLOGUE
2020	"5:59 (Five-Fifty Nine)"	Single	4NOLOGUE
2020	"YESTERDAY TODAY TOMORROW" with 4NOLOGUE Trainees	Single	4NOLOGUE
2021	"Life Ain't Over"	TRINITY 1st Full Album: EP.01 BREATH	4NOLOGUE
2022	"Nobody"	TRINITY 1st Full Album: EP.01 BREATH	4NOLOGUE
2022	"I Don't Miss You"	TRINITY 1st Full Album: EP.01 BREATH	4NOLOGUE
2022	"Blue Moon"	OST. To My Puzzle Pieces	OKAY-D Digital
2022	"My Princess"	OST. My Sassy Princess 2022	One Music
2022	"Oh! Oh!"	TRINITY 1st Full Album: EP.01 BREATH	4NOLOGUE
2023	"Champagne Poppin"	TRINITY 1st Full Album: EP.02 DESIRE	4NOLOGUE
2023	"Drop Dead" with Ballistik Boyz	Single	4NOLOGUE
2023	"100 Days"	TRINITY 1st Full Album: EP.02 DESIRE	4NOLOGUE
2023	"Congrats"	TRINITY 1st Full Album: EP.02 DESIRE	4NOLOGUE
2023	"Thank You All"	TRINITY 1st Full Album: EP.02 DESIRE	4NOLOGUE
2026	"Reason Of Seasons"	Ost. Lovers & Gangsters	GMMTV RECORDS

== Awards and nominations ==
Year	Nominated work	Category	Award	Result	Ref.
2019	In Family We Trust	Best Team Ensemble	10th Nataraj Awards	Won	
2019	Night Light	Best Song (with Nine by Nine)	2019 Line TV Awards	Nominated	
2019	Nine by Nine	Top Talk-About Artist	MThai Top Talk-About 2019 Awards	Won	
2019	Nine by Nine	Rising Star	Kazz Awards 2019	Won	
2020	TRINITY	Popular Thai International Artist	16th Komchadluek Awards	Nominated	
2020	TRINITY	Trending Artist	Kazz Awards 2020	Won	
2020	TRINITY	New Artist of the Year	2020 Joox Thailand Music Awards	Nominated	
2021	Mother Gamer	Best Actor	17th Komchadluek Awards	Nominated	
2021	Mother Gamer	Best Actor	11th Thai Film Directors Association Awards	Nominated	
2021	Mother Gamer	Best Actor	18th Starpics Thai Film Awards	Nominated	
2021	Mother Gamer	Moral Creation Media Award for Movies	2020 Moral Media Awards	Won	
2021	TRINITY	Youth Favorite Artist - Group	2020-2021 Thailand Master Youth Awards	Won	
2021	TRINITY	Top Social Artist of the Year	2021 Joox Thailand Music Awards	Nominated	
2021	In Family We Trust	Best Ensemble Cast	2nd White TV Awards	Won	
2021	TRINITY	Favorite Group Artist	Maya Awards 2021	Nominated	
2021	TRINITY	Trending Artist	Kazz Awards 2021	Nominated	
