= Line TV Awards =

Thai awards show presented by LINE TV Thailand

LINE TV Awards
- Current: 2021 Line TV Awards
- Awarded for: Excellence in television and music
- Country: Thailand
- Presented by: LINE TV Thailand
- First award: 2018; 8 years ago
- Website: Official website

Line TV Awards (styled as LINE TV Awards), is an annual entertainment awards presented by LINE TV Thailand. Held within the service's annual NEXPLOSION event, the awards honor people in the Thai entertainment industry and their achievements in the fields of music, television and drama. Nominees are fan-voted through the LINE app and website.

The first ceremony was held on 20 February 2018 at the Royal Paragon Hall of Siam Paragon. In 2021, the awards ceremony was held virtually for the first time with no in-person venue due to the COVID-19 pandemic.

== Ceremonies ==
#	Date	Venue
1st	20 February 2018	Royal Paragon Hall, Siam Paragon, Bangkok, Thailand
2nd	12 February 2019	Royal Paragon Hall, Siam Paragon, Bangkok, Thailand
3rd	19 February 2020	Royal Paragon Hall, Siam Paragon, Bangkok, Thailand
4th	5 August 2021	Bangkok, Thailand (Held virtually)

== Award categories ==
As of 2021, there are 12 categories split between the fan-voted or major awards and special awards which are based on app and website statistics:

=== Major awards ===
- Best Dramatic Scene
- Best Comedy Scene
- Best Viral Scene
- Best Kiss Scene
- Best Couple
- Best Rising Star
- Best Song

=== Special awards ===
- Series of the Year (awarded as Content of the Year from 2018 to 2019)
- Animation of the Year
- Top Searched Content of the Year
- Most Hearted Content of the Year
- Most Followers of the Year

=== Past award categories ===
- Best Fight Scene (2018–2019)
- Most Viewed Content of the Year (2018–2019)
- Top Entertainment/Entertainment Program of the Year (2018–2020)
- Best Friends (2019)
- Talk of the Town Award (2019)
- Best MC (2019–2020)
