= Sivakorn Adulsuttikul =

Thai actor, model and singer (born 1998)

- ศิวกร อดุลสุทธิกุล
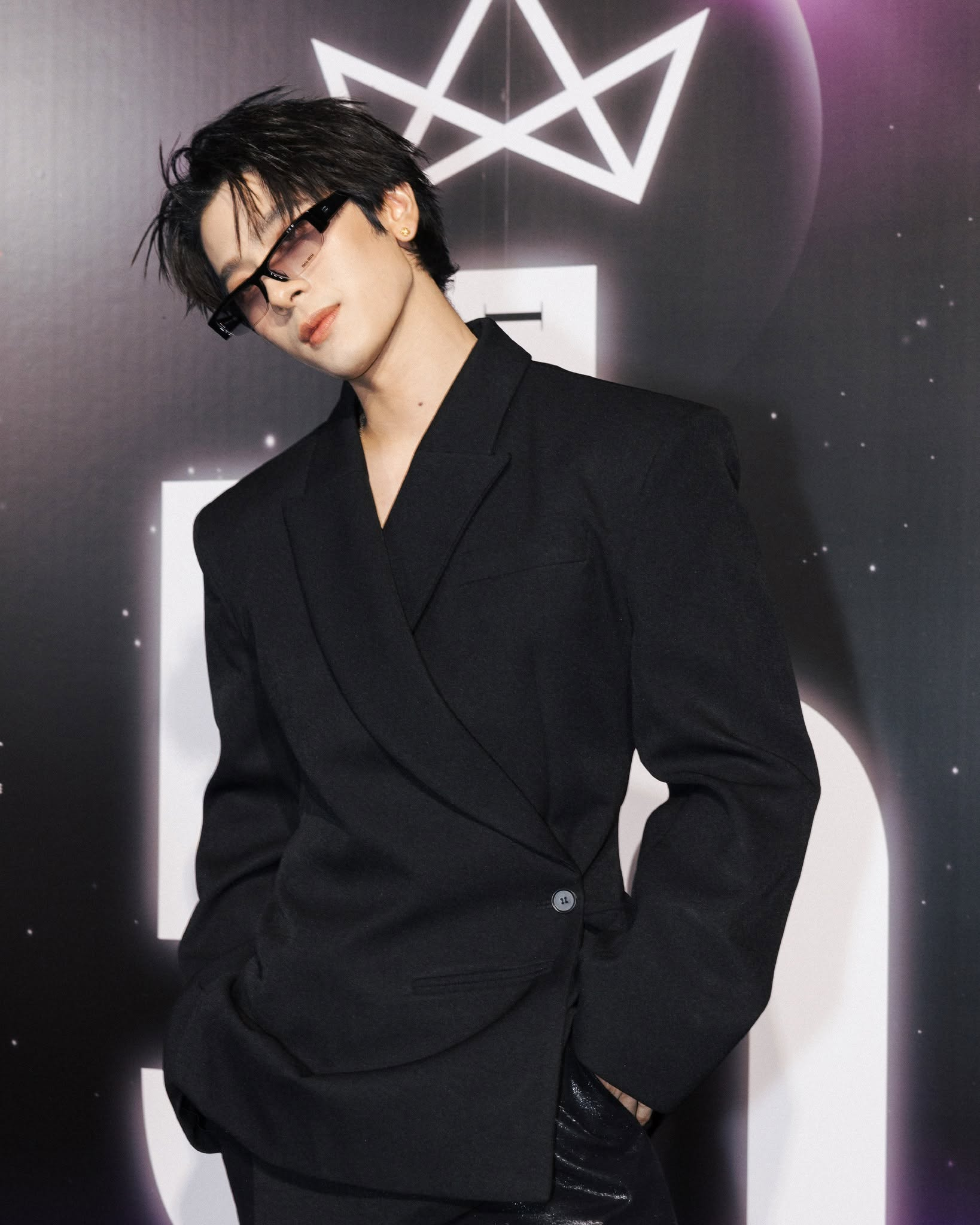
- SVRN in 2026
- Born: 7 May 1998 (age 28); Chonburi, Thailand
- Other names: Porsche; SVRN; XX
- Education: Ladprao Bilingual School; Ramkhamhaeng Advent International School; Thammasat University
- Occupations: Singer; actor; brand endorser; music producer; songwriter; music composer
- Agent: GMM Global
- Height: 1.73 m (5 ft 8 in)
- Parents: Sunchai Adulsuttikul (father); Jirachutinunt Adulsuttikul (mother)
- Musical career
- Genres: Pop; T-pop; Hip hop
- Instrument: Vocals
- Years active: 2014–present
- Label: 4nologue (2019–2024) Gliide (2025–present)
- Formerly of: VRP; Nine by Nine; Trinity

Sivakorn Adulsuttikul (Thai: ศิวกร อดุลสุทธิกุล, born 7 May 1998), nicknamed Porsche (Thai: ปอร์เช่), also known as SVRN, is a Thai singer, rapper, actor and is a member of the former trio Trinity. He is the grand champion of the Thai singing competition The Mask Thai Literature.

== Early life and education ==
Sivakorn was born on 7 May 1998 in Chonburi Province, Thailand. His mother is Utsanunt Jirachutinunt and he has a younger brother named Nathanai Adulsuttikul. Sivakorn started dancing when he was around 7–8 years old when his mother enrolled him in a dance school. His dance teacher then recommended him to audition for the record label Kamikaze. He finished high school on Ramkhamhaeng Advent International School, and graduated from the Thammasat University, Faculty of Liberal Arts with the degree of Bachelor of Arts in International Studies ASEAN-CHINA (IAC) international programme.

== Career ==
Porsche Sivakorn began his singing career in 2014 under Kamikaze with its boy group, V.R.P. Their debut single, "Shout" was released in 2014. His first film role came from the horror film Ghost Coins (2014). He also appeared with other Kamikaze artists in the mini series 21 Days (2017). Sivakorn stayed with the label until its closure in 2017.

He auditioned for the record label 4nologue in 2018 and debuted as a member of the Thai boy group Nine by Nine, a one-year special project by 4nologue and production company Nadao Bangkok. The group has released five singles from 2018 to 2019 and a mini-album entitled "En-Route". He served as the lead rapper and dancer of the group. As part of the project, he starred in the TV series In Family We Trust (2018) as Kuaitiao and Great Men Academy (2019) as Good.

He appeared with Jackrin Kungwankiatichai as the Holvichai-Kavee duo in the 2019 TV singing competition show The Mask Thai Literature. The duo were hailed as the season's champions when they received the highest number of votes from the audience and viewers' text votes during the championship round. They became the youngest and first duo to win in the show.

In September 2019, Sivakorn debuted in another boy group formed by 4nologue namely as Trinity where he continues to pursue his musical career. At present, the group has released five singles, one featured single, and a mini-album. They also held three showcase stages across the country.

In 2021, he became the brand ambassador for the cosmetics brand retailer Kiehl's Thailand, with Jackrin Kungwankiatichai. As part of the promotional campaign, the duo has released the single "My Calendula".

On February 29, 2024, 4nologue released a statement announcing that Porsche's contract had expired. However the group continue to make occasional joint appearances while pursuing individual activities.

After his contract with 4nologue expired in February 2024, Sivakorn continued working in music, including songwriting and production. In 2026, he began his solo career under the stage name SVRN (Sovereign) and became the first artist of Gliide, a music project established through a collaboration between GMM Music and Warner Music Asia. SVRN released his debut single, "Why", on 14 May 2026, marking Sivakorn's return to music as a solo artist. He subsequently released "Overhoped" in July 2026.

In August 2026, Sivakorn performed as SVRN at the Miss Universe Thailand 2026 Final Competition on 23 August 2026. He performed his single "Overhoped" during the swimsuit competition segment and later for the first time, he performed an English-language version of "หนึ่งในร้อย" ("One in a Hundred").

== Discography ==
=== SVRN ===
Year	Song	Album	Label	Distributor
2026	"Why"	Album	Gliide	Warner Music Group
2026	"Overhoped"	Album	Gliide	Warner Music Group
2026	"One Piece"	Album	Gliide	Warner Music Group
2026	"Why [Atelier Session]" with Max The Darkest Romance	Single	Gliide	Warner Music Group
2026	"Fanboy" with AuAu & Heart of BUS	Mr. Fanboy OST	DMD Music	Universal Music Group

=== Formerly ===
==== Kamikaze, Nine by Nine, Trinity & XX ====
Year	Song	Album	Label
2014	ปาว ปาว ("Shout")	Single	Kamikaze
2014	รักกันอย่าบังคับ ("Dictator")	Single	Kamikaze
2015	โชคดีที่มีเธอ ("Luck")	Single	Kamikaze
2015	กล้ามั้ย ("N.E.X.T")	Single	Kamikaze
2016	ระวังติดใจ ("Play With Me")	Single	Kamikaze
2016	กึ่งยิงกึ่งผ่าน ("Blend In") with Angie Kamikaze	Single	Kamikaze
2018	"Night Light"	Nine by Nine (en Route)	4nologue
2018	"Hypnotize"	Nine by Nine (en Route)	4nologue
2019	ผู้โชคดี ("The Lucky One")	Nine by Nine (en Route)	4nologue
2019	ไม่น่าเจอเลย ("Shouldn’t")	Nine by Nine (en Route)	4nologue
2019	"Eternity"	Nine by Nine (en Route)	4nologue
2019	"Haters Got Nothing"	Trinity: The 1st Mini Album "The Elements"	4nologue
2019	"IOU"	Trinity: The 1st Mini Album "The Elements"	4nologue
2019	"Jazzy"	Trinity: The 1st Mini Album "The Elements"	4nologue
2019	"Hidden Track"	Trinity: The 1st Mini Album "The Elements"	4nologue
2020	"5:59 (Five-Fifty Nine)"	Single	4nologue
2020	"Yesterday Today Tomorrow" with 4nologue Trainees	Single	4nologue
2021	เพราะเธอแหละ ("My Calendula") with Jackie Trinity	Single	4nologue
2021	"Life Ain't Over"	Trinity 1st Full Album: Breath	4nologue
2022	"Nobody"	Trinity 1st Full Album: Breath	4nologue
2022	"I Don't Miss You"	Trinity 1st Full Album: Breath	4nologue
2022	"My Princess"	OST. My Sassy Princess 2022	One Music
2022	"Oh! Oh!"	Trinity 1st Full Album: Breath	4nologue
2025	"I Like U, I Luv U" with Matcha	Single	GMM Music
2025	"พูดจริง (Hidden Track) [Mash Up]" with Meyou	Single	GMM Music & 4nologue
2025	"เรา"; Original by Cocktail	Ours Ever Tribute To Cocktail	GMM Music

== Live performances ==
=== Album events ===
Event	Date	Venue	City	Location	Ref.
Overhoped : MV Premiere Event	July 2, 2026	The Corner House	Bangkok	Thailand	

=== Joint events, concerts, and music festivals ===
Event	Date	Venue	City	Location	Role	Ref.
Monster Music Festival 2025	November 1, 2025	QSNCC	Bangkok	Thailand	Official Lineup	
Big Mountain Music Festival 15	December 6, 2025	The Ocean Khaoyai	Nakhon Ratchasima	Thailand	Official Lineup	
Amazing Thailand Countdown 2026	December 28, 2026	Iconsiam	Bangkok	Thailand	Official Lineup	
Pixxie Tales Concert: The Enchanted Ceremony	February 7, 2026	Impact Arena	Nonthaburi	Thailand	Special Guest	
GMA Showcase 2026	June 26, 2026	Corner Max	Taipei	Taiwan	Official Lineup	
Oligio X	July 22, 2026	Siam Paragon	Bangkok	Thailand	Special Guest	
JD Sport 10th Anniversary	July 25, 2026	Sunway Pyramid	Kuala Lumpur	Malaysia	Official Lineup	
Monster Music Festival 2026	July 26, 2026	QSNCC	Bangkok	Thailand	Official Lineup	
Duang Go Round Concert	August 1, 2026	Impact Arena	Nonthaburi	Thailand	Special Guest as Trinity	
A-Nation 2026	October 3, 2026	A-Nation Special Venue, Odaiba	Tokyo	Japan	Official Lineup	

=== Awards shows ===
Event	Date	Venue	City	Location	Ref.
Miss Universe Thailand 2026	August 23, 2026	MGI Hall	Bangkok	Thailand	

== Filmography ==
=== Films ===
Year	Title	Role	Notes
2014	Ghost Coins	Jack	Main role
2026	My Dearest Assassin	M	Main role

=== Television ===
Year	Title	Role	Notes
2018	In Family We Trust	Kuaitiao	Main role
2019	Great Men Academy	Phasu Wisaisombun (Good)	Main role

=== Web series ===
Year	Title	Role	Notes
2016	21 Days	Thieng Trong	Supporting role
2018	Into the Light with 9x9	Himself	Musical series
2019	The Journey of 9x9 Documentary	Himself	Line TV Original Documentary
2019	TRINITY: The Elementories	Himself	

== Awards and nominations ==
Year	Nominated work	Category	Award	Result	Ref.
2019	In Family We Trust	Best Team Ensemble	10th Nataraj Awards	Won	
2019	"Night Light"	Best Song (with Nine by Nine)	2019 Line TV Awards	Nominated	
2019	Nine by Nine	Top Talk-About Artist	MThai Top Talk-About 2019 Awards	Won	
2019	Nine by Nine	Rising Star	2019 Kazz Awards	Won	
2020	Great Men Academy	Best Viral Scene	2020 Line TV Awards	Won	
2020	Sivakorn Adulsuttikul	Cute Boy	2020 Kazz Awards	Nominated	
2020	Trinity	Trending Artist	2020 Kazz Awards	Won	
2020	Trinity	New Artist of the Year	2020 Joox Thailand Music Awards	Nominated	
2020	Trinity	Popular Thai International Artist	16th Komchadluek Awards	Nominated	
2021	Trinity	Youth Favorite Artist - Group	2020-2021 Thailand Master Youth Awards	Won	
2021	Trinity	Top Social Artist of the Year	2021 Joox Thailand Music Awards	Nominated	
2021	Trinity	Favorite Group Artist	Maya Awards 2021	Nominated	
2021	Trinity	Trending Artist	Kazz Awards 2021	Nominated	
2021	In Family We Trust	Best Ensemble Cast	2nd White TV Awards	Won	
2026	SVRN	Iconic Performers	LSA Thailand 50 Icons of 2026	Won	
2026	My Dearest Assassin	Supporting Actor of The Year	Praew Awards 2026	Nominated	
