= Nine by Nine =

Thai boy band

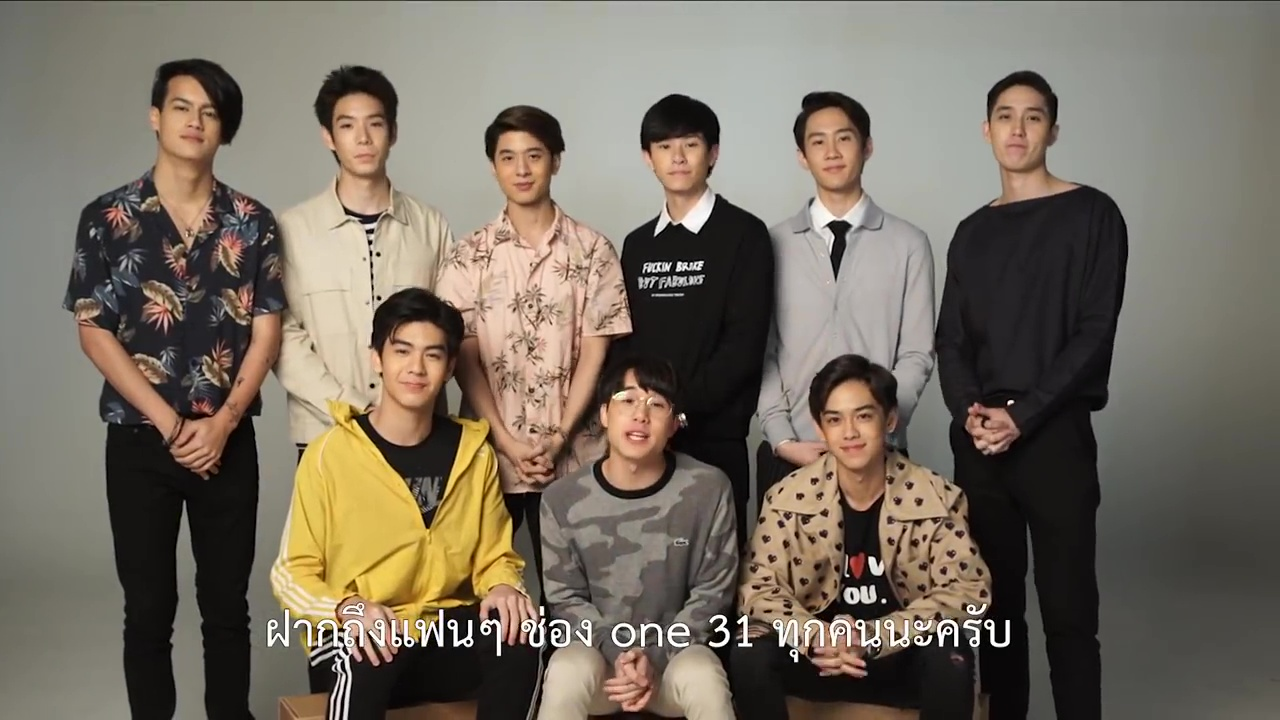
- Nine by Nine during the In Family We Trust promotion in 2018

Background information
- Also known as: 9x9
- Origin: Bangkok, Thailand
- Genres: T-pop; pop
- Years active: 2018–2019
- Labels: 4nologue; Nadao Bangkok
- Members: Thanapob; Jaylerr; Jamyjamess; Captain; Porsche; Third; Paris; Ryu; Jackie

Nine by Nine (Thai: ไนน์บายนาย, stylized as NINE BY NINE or 9x9) was a nine-member Thai boy group formed in 2018. The members were brought together in a special one-year project created in collaboration of 4Nologue with Nadao Bangkok. From 2018 to 2019, the group has released one mini-album and five songs, embarked on a three concert series, and appeared as cast members for Thai TV series In Family We Trust (2018) and Great Men Academy (2019). The group disbanded in March 2019 when the duration of the special project has formally ended.

== Members ==
Name	Nickname	Instagram	Birth date	Agency
Thanapob Leeratanakajorn	Tor (Thanapob)	@thanapob_lee	14 February 1994	TNPLEE.Connect
Krissanapoom Pibulsonggram	Jaylerr (JJ)	@jaylerr	15 August 1996	QOW Entertainment
Teeradon Supapunpinyo	James (JamyJamess) (JMJ)	@jamyjamess	27 April 1997	JMJ Label (Note: Throughout the project, Teeradon was signed under Nadao Bangkok. In April 2019, he announced that he will not renew his contract with the agency to pursue his singing and performing career and later signed under 4NOLOGUE to be part of its boy band, TRINITY. In April 2021, he announced that he terminated his contract with 4NOLOGUE and will continue his career outside the agency.)
Chonlathorn Kongyingyong	Captain (CisT)	@ccaptainch	2 February 1998	ccaptainch_official
Sivakorn Adulsuttikul	Porsche (XX)	@porsche.sivk	7 May 1998	4NOLOGUE
Paris Intarakomalyasut	Ice (Paris)	@icepariss	22 October 1998	Ice Paris Entertainment
Lapat Ngamchaweng	Third (3rd)	@thirdd	24 November 1998	4NOLOGUE
Vachirawich Aranthanawong (Note: Chisanucha Tantimedh (Mew, also known as MEYOU) from GMM Grammy’s MBO left the band, and was replaced by Vachirawich on 21 March 2018.)	Ryu	@ryu_vachirawich	10 October 2000	Channel 3
Jackrin Kungwankiatichai	Jackie (JK)	@j.jackr	29 March 2001	4NOLOGUE

== Career ==
4nologue held a press conference on 1 March 2018 to unveil the project and introduce the members of Nine by Nine. The label's CEO Anuwat Wichiennarat says the group members are set to star in two television series, to be produced by Nadao Bangkok. The group underwent a full year of hard training, which aims to develop each members' singing and dancing skills. Their first television series was In Family We Trust where they took on the roles as the grandchildren of a Thai Chinese business family.

Nine by Nine officially debuted on 8 November 2018, releasing their debut single "Night Light" and its music video. The second single entitled "Hypnotize" was released on December 22, 2018, in an exclusive first official streaming on JOOX. The 'Hypnotize' Music Video was released on 9 January 2019 and was available to stream in various online channels. In February 2019, Nine by Nine released their third single entitled "The Lucky One" which also served as the official soundtrack for their second TV series, Great Men Academy.

The fourth single "Shouldn't" was released on 7 March 2019, days before the group's last concert. Nine by Nine's last single entitled "Eternity", was released and performed for the first time, on 9 March 2019 during the EN(D)ROUTE concert in Impact Arena. The music video for the song featured scenes from the final concert and other behind-the-scene videos of the group.

Almost a year after Nine by Nine's disbandment, seven out of the nine members made a surprise appearance as a group and performed at the 2020 Line TV Awards where they also received the Best Viral Scene Award for Great Men Academy.

== Concert tours ==
Shortly after their debut, Nine by Nine embarked on a concert tour entitled "9x9 On The Route". They performed at various venues until the end of December 2018.

By the end of January 2019, 4nologue announced the start of a second concert tour entitled "9x9 Thailand Tour: Route to the Destination". The first concert was on 2 February 2019, with the last concert date on 23 February 2019.

On 9 March 2019, the Nine by Nine project has ended and the group performed their last concert date dubbed as the 'One-year Finale of the Nine by Nine Project', "The 9x9 THE FINAL CONCERT: EN[D] ROUTE".

== Filmography ==
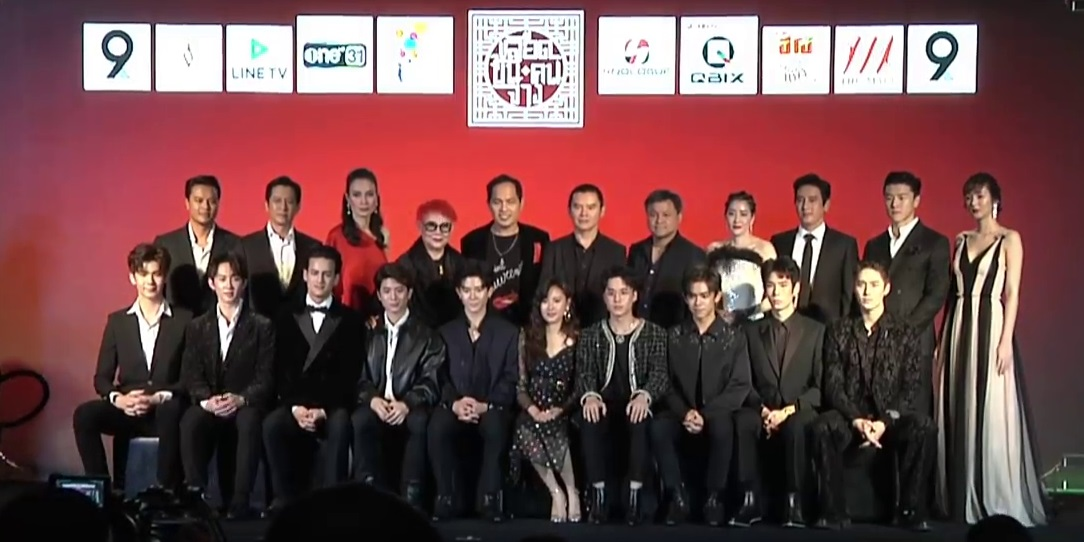
Nine by Nine with other cast and executives of In Family We Trust

The Nine by Nine members have starred and take on the main roles in the Thai TV series In Family We Trust. Their respective character's names are as follows:

- Thanapob as Yi
- Jaylerr as Pete
- James as Vegas
- Captain as Earn
- Third as Tao
- Porsche as Kuaitiao
- Paris as Chi
- Jackie as Toei
- Ryu as Macau

In 2019, seven of the Nine by Nine members appeared in the TV series, Great Men Academy with their respective character's names as follows:

- James as Love
- Paris as Vier
- Jaylerr as Tangmo
- Captain as Sean
- Porsche as Good
- Third as Nuclear
- Jackie as Menn

Aside from the two TV series, Nine by Nine also appeared in two musical series on the streaming platform Line TV entitled Into The Light (2018) and The Journey of 9x9 Documentary (2019).

== Discography ==
=== Mini Album ===
Year	Name	Singles
2019	En Route	1. NIGHT LIGHT; 2. Hypnotize; 3. The Lucky One (ผู้โชคดี); 4. Shouldn't (ไม่น่าเจอเลย); 5. Eternity

=== Music video ===
Year	Title	Director
2018	NIGHT LIGHT	Lee Sang Deok & Mustache Films
2019	Hypnotize	Papa Charlie

== Awards and nominations ==
Year	Nominated work	Category	Award	Result	Ref.
2019	In Family We Trust	Best Team Ensemble	10th Nataraj Awards	Won	
2019	"Night Light"	Best Song	2019 Line TV Awards	Nominated	
2019	Nine by Nine	Top Talk-About Artist	MThai Top Talk-About 2019 Awards	Won	
2019	Nine by Nine	Rising Star	Kazz Awards 2019	Won	
2020	Great Men Academy	Best Viral Scene	2020 Line TV Awards	Won	
