= Paris Intarakomalyasut =

Thai actor and singer (born 1998)

- พาริส อินทรโกมาลย์สุต
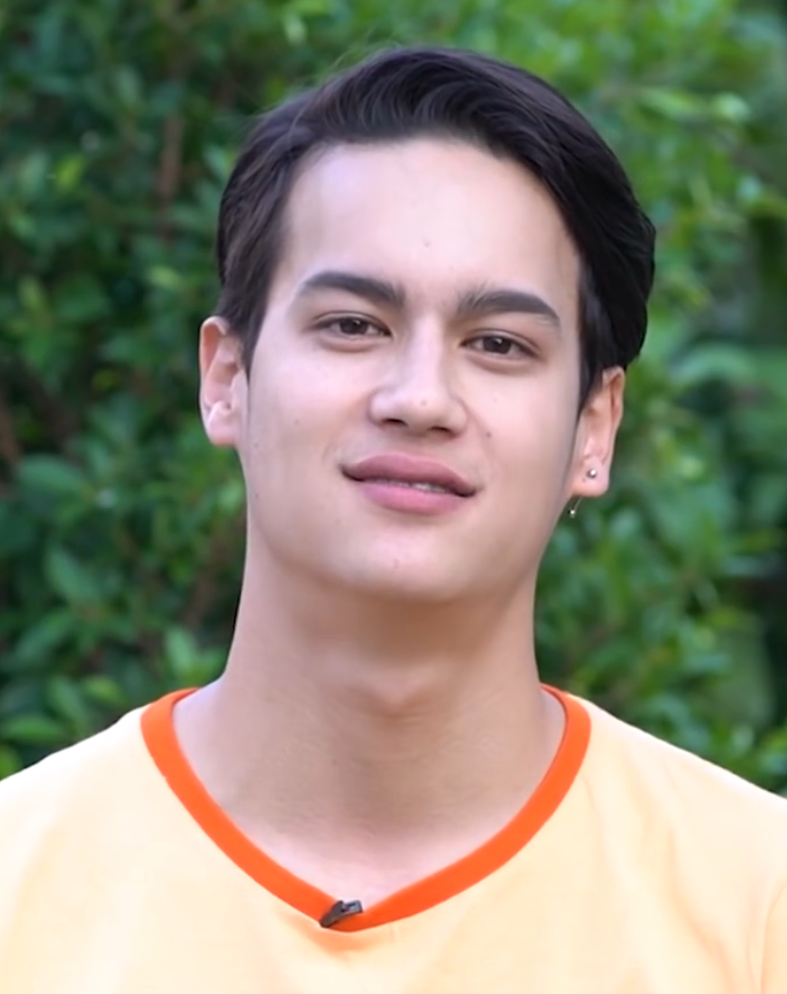
- Intarakomalyasut in 2018
- Born: 22 October 1998 (age 27); Bangkok, Thailand
- Other name: Ice
- Education: Amnuay Silpa School; Chulalongkorn University
- Occupations: Actor; Singer
- Years active: 2017–present
- Agent: Nadao Bangkok (2017–2022)
- Known for: Chi in In Family We Trust; Pat in Bad Genius
- Musical career
- Genres: Pop; T-pop; R&B
- Instruments: Vocals; keyboard; drums
- Years active: 2018–present
- Labels: 4nologue; GMM Grammy; Nadao Music
- Formerly of: Nine by Nine; Jaylerr x Paris

Paris Intarakomalyasut (Thai: พาริส อินทรโกมาลย์สุต; RTGS: Pharit Inthrakomansut; born 22 October 1998), nicknamed Ice (Thai: ไอซ์), is a Thai actor and singer. He is known for his main roles as Chi in In Family We Trust (2018) and as Pat in Bad Genius (2020).

== Early life and education ==
Ice is the youngest son in his family. He is currently taking up a bachelor's degree from the Faculty of Communication Arts at Chulalongkorn University. He is currently living with his mother and older sisters. He is of Eurasian mix with Thai descent.

He is a nephew of Chavanond Intarakomalyasut (Democrat Party spokesperson), grandson of Manasakdi Intarakomalyasut (long-time Bangkok PM and Head of Bank of Thailand), and great grandson of Yos Intarakomalyasut (whom was head of Ministry of Agriculture). Although he tends not to publicise, he is from a family of powerful multi-generational political clan.

== Career ==
He started his acting career as a guest in Project S The Series: Skate Our Souls which aired on GMM 25. He then made his acting debut in 2018, as part of 4Nologue's boy group project Nine by Nine, by playing the role of Chi for In Family We Trust where he acknowledged the similarities of his character in the series and his real life experience, as someone who has lost a father, which made him more passionate about portraying the role. This later earned him GQ Thailand's New Face of the Year award for 2018. He went on to land in another main role for Great Men Academy together with six other members of Nine by Nine.

He also ventured into singing as part of Nine by Nine, which debuted in November 2018, with the release of their first single "Night Light" from the group's mini album entitled "En Route". In 2019, he teamed up with Nichaphat Chatchaipholrat (Pearwah) for "รักติดไซเรน" (Rak Tid Siren), the OST for My Ambulance. The song is considered as one of the two biggest Thai songs for 2019 alongside "ธารารัตน์" (Thararat) by Youngohm according to Google and has already reached over 246 million views on YouTube. He was also tapped for "Human Error", a project by GMM Grammy in collaboration with Line TV and Nadao Music, where he got to work with his co-members in Nine by Nine namely Krissanapoom Pibulsonggram (JJ) and Chonlathorn Kongyingyong (Captain).

He got his first lead role in a drama series with หนี้เสน่หา (Nee Sanaeha) on One31 where he co-stars with Nuengthida Sophon (Noona). In 2021, Paris starred for the first time as a lead role in the Netflix original film, Ghost Lab.

In November 2021, Paris released his latest single entitled "Smile In The Sky" where he co-directed its accompanying music video.

== Filmography ==
=== Films ===
Year	Title	Role	Notes	Ref.
2019	Tootsies & The Fake	Himself	Guest role	
2019	RED	Himself	Human Error short film	
2021	Ghost Lab	Arjong Soonyata (Dr. Kla)	Main role	
2022	Love Destiny: The Movie	Metus	Main role	

=== Television series ===
Year	Title	Role	Notes	Ref.
2017	Project S The Series: Skate Our Souls	Ko	Guest role	
2018	In Family We Trust	Pharada Jiraanan / "Chi"	Main role	
2019	Great Men Academy	Sivakorn Wisetphiriya / "Vier"	Main role	
2019	The Stranded	Northern Children (Ep. 7)	Guest role	
2019	Nee Sanaeha	Akanee	Main role	
2020	Bad Genius	Pat	Main role	
2022	We and Us	TBA	Main role	

== Discography ==
Year	Song Title	Album	Ref.
2018	"NIGHT LIGHT"	Nine by Nine (en Route)	
2018	"Hypnotize"	Nine by Nine (en Route)	
2019	"The Lucky One"	Nine by Nine (en Route)	
2019	"Shouldn't"	Nine by Nine (en Route)	
2019	"Eternity"	Nine by Nine (en Route)	
2019	"รักติดไซเรน" (Rak Tid Siren) with PEARWAH	OST. My Ambulance	
2019	"รักติดไซเรน" (Rak Tid Siren) Midnight Version	OST. My Ambulance	
2019	"Best For You"	Human Error	
2020	"ดี๊ดี" (Unexpected) with JAYLERR	Single	
2020	"หอมเธอ" ft. Jarinporn Joonkiat (Toey)	Single	
2020	"Follow Me" ft. Violette Wautier	OST. Bad Genius	
2020	"Nude" with JAYLERR	Single	
2021	"นาทีนี้" (Let's Love)	Single	
2021	"Feels Like A Year" with JAYLERR	Single	
2021	"Smile In The Sky"	Single	

== Awards and nominations ==
Year	Nominated work	Category	Award	Result	Ref.
2018	Paris Intarakomalyasut	New Face Award	GQ Thailand Men of the Year Awards	Won	
2018	In Family We Trust	Shining Star Award (Male)	HOWE Awards	Won	
2018	In Family We Trust	Best Team Ensemble shared with in Family We Trust cast	10th Nataraj Awards	Won	
2019	Paris Intarakomalyasut	Beautiful Boy Award	OK! Magazine Thailand	Won	
2019	"Night Light"	Best Song with Nine by Nine	2019 Line TV Awards	Nominated	
2019	Nine by Nine	Top Talk-About Artist	MThai Top Talk-About 2019 Awards	Won	
2019	Nine by Nine	Rising Star	Kazz Awards 2019	Won	
2020	"รักติดไซเรน" (Rak Tid Siren)	Best Drama Soundtrack shared with PEARWAH	11th Nataraj Awards	Nominated	
2020	Great Men Academy	Best Viral Scene shared with Great Men Academy cast	2020 Line TV Awards	Won	
2020	"รักติดไซเรน" (Rak Tid Siren)	Best Song shared with PEARWAH	2020 Line TV Awards	Won	
2020	"รักติดไซเรน" (Rak Tid Siren)	Single Hits of the Year shared with PEARWAH	The Guitar Mag Awards	Won	
2020	"รักติดไซเรน" (Rak Tid Siren)	Collaboration Song of the Year shared with PEARWAH	2020 Joox Thailand Music Awards	Won	
2020	"รักติดไซเรน" (Rak Tid Siren)	Pop Song of the Year shared with PEARWAH	2020 Joox Thailand Music Awards	Won	
2020	"รักติดไซเรน" (Rak Tid Siren)	2019 Hottest Song of the Year	Kazz Awards 2020	Won	
2020	"รักติดไซเรน" (Rak Tid Siren)	Melody of the Year	LINE Thailand People's Choice Awards 2020	Won	
2020	In Family We Trust	Best Newcomer – Actor	Asia Contents Awards	Won	
2021	Bad Genius	Best Supporting Actor	17th Komchadluek Awards	Nominated	
2021	Bad Genius	Best Supporting Actor	12th Nataraj Awards	Nominated	
2021	Bad Genius	Best Team Ensemble shared with Bad Genius cast	12th Nataraj Awards	Won	
2021	Bad Genius	Popular Actor	Siam Series Awards 2021	Nominated	
2021	In Family We Trust	Best Ensemble Cast	2nd White TV Awards	Won	
2022	Paris Intarakomalyasut	Male Artist of the Year	Maya Awards 2022	Nominated	
2022	Ghost Lab	Best Supporting Actor	18th Komchadluek Awards	Nominated	
