= Spare Me Your Mercy =

2024 Thai television series

- Also known as: Karunyakhat
- Thai: การุณยฆาต
- Genre: Medical drama; Crime, Mystery, Psychological, Thriller; LGBTQ+, Romantic drama
- Based on: "การุณยฆาต (Euthanasia)" by: Sammon; (Isaree Siriwankulthon)
- Showrunner: Sirilux Srisukon
- Screenplay by: Sirilux Srisukon
- Directed by: Worawit Khuttiyayothin
- Starring: Thanapob Leeratanakachorn; Krissanapoom Pibulsonggram
- Theme music composer: Terdsak Janpan
- Opening theme: "Weight of the Crown" by Edward McCormack (Episodes 1 and 8 only)
- Ending theme: "True or Tale!? (เพียงนิทาน)"; By Nont Tanont
- Composer: Achariya Dulyapaiboon
- Country of origin: Thailand
- Original language: Thai
- No. of series: 1
- No. of episodes: 8

Production
- Executive producers: Takonkiet Viravan; Nipon Pewnen; Rafah Damrongchaitham
- Producer: Nipon Pewnen
- Editor: Foolhouse Production
- Camera setup: Multiple-camera
- Running time: 50−60 minutes
- Production company: The One Enterprise

Original release
- Network: One 31; oneD (Thailand only); iQIYI (Some countries); YouTube (Full episode except for Hong Kong, Japan, South Korea, Thailand); bloome+ from Amazon Prime Video (Japan only)
- Release: November 28 – December 25, 2024

Related
- Manner of Death

Spare Me Your Mercy (Thai: การุณยฆาต pronounced [kāː.rūn.ya.kʰâːt] 'mercy killing' or 'euthanasia') is a 2024 Thai mystery drama boys' love series starring Thanapob Leeratanakachorn and Krissanapoom Pibulsonggram in the lead roles. It was produced by Nipon Pewnen, and executive produced by The One Enterprise, a Thai mass media company. It was directed by Worawit Khuttiyayothin and the showrunner and screenplay was written by Sirilux Srisukon, following their collaboration in the drama series Inspector Vedas. The series was based on a novel with the same name, and alternative on English language versions for e-book or Kindle, originally written by Sammon.

The series is the fifth within oneD Original contents, a special project of the application oneD. It premiered its first episodes in Thailand on November 28, 2024. A censored version was broadcast on Thai digital television channel One 31, and uncensored versions were released on various OTT platforms in Thailand and other countries. The series concluded on December 25, 2024, with 8 episodes in total.

== Synopsis ==
Original official synopsis from mebmarket.com, english translation by bltai.com.

Do you have a right to terminate your life?

The suspiciously increasing rate of deaths in terminal patients left an indelible trace of doubt in Pol.Cap. Wasan's mind. His mother, who had just passed away only a few days before he arrived in his hometown, might be one of the victims of this incident.

Dr. Kantaphat, a palliative doctor who had taken care of Wasan's mother in her final days, became the one who took care of her son's heart in his sorrowful days as well. As their relationship went deeper, the mystery was gradually unraveled and every clue, in this case, led to Kantaphat.

How could Wasan's break through this dilemma and trust his lover with all of his heart?

== Cast ==
The list below contains those that have been credited within the series opening title sequence and those who are credited as "also starring". Recurring and guest stars are listed on the pages.

=== Main ===
- Thanapob "Tor" Leeratanakachorn as Dr. Kantaphat "Kan" Akkharamethi (Dr. Kan), a Family medicine doctor.
- Krissanapoom "JJ" Pibulsonggram as Pol.Capt. Wasan's "Tew" Khambunrueang.

=== Supporting ===
- Gandhi Wasuwitchayagit as Dr. Somsak La-amornchai, a superintendent of the Wiang Singha Hospital.
- Atchareeya "Prim" Potipipittanakorn as Dr. Suphaphorn "Rin" Duangnert (Dr. Rin), a Legal medicine doctor.
- Sivawut "Nut" Putraserani as Joe, he is workmate with Wasan's.
- Arisara "Fresh" Wongchalee as Onanong "On" Sangpeng, a head nurse in the Wiang Singha Hospital.
- Pongsatorn "Phuak" Jongwilas as Pol.Sub.Lt. Kawin "Guin" Kongthong.
- Bhumibhat "Aelm" Thavornsiri as Pharmacist Chanchai "Boss" Maneerat.
- Atchareeya Potipipittanakorn as Rin Suphaphorn Duangnet (Doctor)

=== Guest ===
- Phutanate "Captain" Hongmanop as Dr. Pirot Kunawan Ph.D.
- Pakachon "Frank" Wo-onsri as Pae, a terminal cancer patient.
- Duangjai "Phiao" Hiransri as Mrs. Rawiwan Khambunrueang, she is Wasan's mother.
- Yasaka "Poo" Chaisorn as Som, he is undertaker with mental disorder.
- Jarunun "Jaa" Phantachat as Urai Dansom, a terminal lung cancer patient.
- Ratchaneeboon "Kiwi" Pheinwikraisophon as Sa, she is Wasan's older sister.
- Dr. Isaree "Sam" Siriwankulthon (Sammon) as a Family medicine doctor (Cameo).

== Production ==
=== Filming ===
==== Locations ====
With most filming having taken place in spaces of Lampang near in northern, Thailand.

=== Music ===
This series music scoring created by Banana Sound Studio with Terdsak Janpan, he is famous music theme composer from In Family We Trust.

==== Opening theme ====
| Episodes | Date | Song name | Composer | Duration (min) | Copyright |
|---|---|---|---|---|---|
| 1 | November 28, 2024 | Weight of the Crown | Edward McCormack | 2:32 | Fired Earth Music.Ltd |
| 2 | December 4, 2024 | TBA | | | |
| 3 | December 5, 2024 | TBA | | | |
| 4 | December 11, 2024 | TBA | | | |
| 5 | December 12, 2024 | True or Tale!? (Edit ver.) | Achariya Dulyapaiboon | 4:16 | GMM Music PCL. |
| 6 | December 18, 2024 | TBA | | | |
| 7 | December 19, 2024 | TBA | | | |
| 8 | December 25, 2024 | Weight of the Crown | Edward McCormack | 2:32 | Fired Earth Music.Ltd |

=== Original soundtrack ===
The Thai-language ending song in this series, "True or Tale!?" (Thai: "เพียงนิทาน", romanized: piiang ní-taan, lit. 'Just a tale'), is sung by Nont Tanont and is a composition by Achariya Dulyapaiboon.
