= Wanyai =

Thai musician

Olran Chujai, known professionally as Wanyai is a Thai musician. He was formerly part of the band Room 39.

He won the 2019 Mnet Asian Music Awards for Best New Asian Artist (Thailand), and the 2020 Joox Thailand Music Awards for Artist of the Year.
