= Krissanapoom Pibulsonggram =

Thai actor, model and singer (born 1996)

- กฤษณภูมิ พิบูลสงคราม
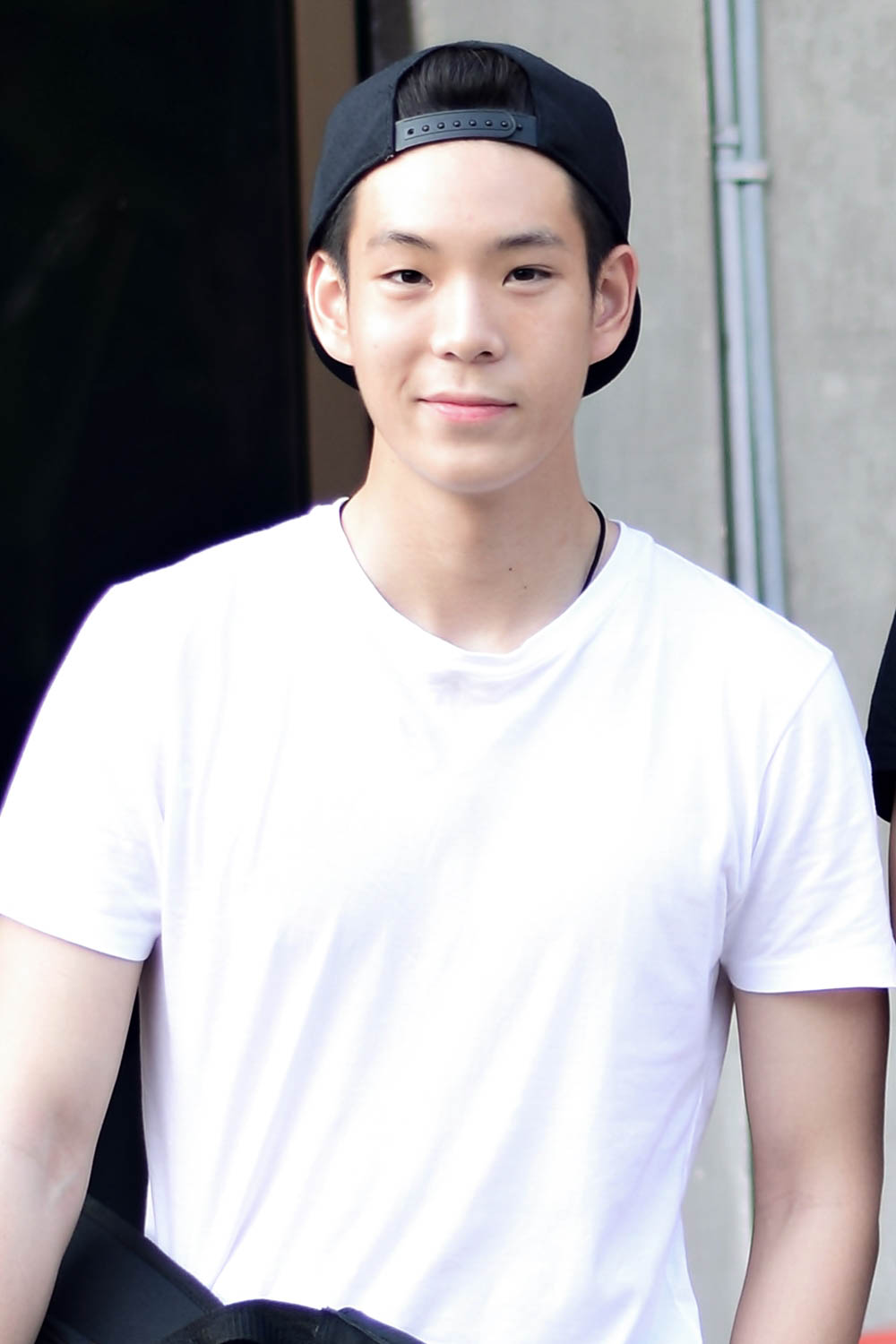
- Krissanapoom in 2015
- Born: 15 August 1996 (age 30); Chiang Mai, Thailand
- Other names: JJ, Jaylerr
- Education: Prince Royal's College; Srinakharinwirot University
- Occupations: Actor; singer; songwriter
- Years active: 2013–present
- Agents: Nadao Bangkok (2015–2021); QOW Entertainment (2022–present)
- Height: 1.80 m (5 ft 11 in)
- Partner: Kanyawee Songmuang (2016-2026)
- Relatives: Plaek Phibunsongkhram (great-grandfather)
- Musical career
- Genres: Pop; T-pop; R&B; Hip hop
- Instrument: Vocals
- Years active: 2018–present
- Labels: 4nologue; Nadao Music; GMM Grammy
- Formerly of: Nine by Nine; Jaylerr x Paris

Krissanapoom Pibulsonggram (Thai: กฤษณภูมิ พิบูลสงคราม; born 15 August 1996), nicknamed JJ (Thai: เจเจ) and also known by the online alias Jaylerr, is a Thai actor, singer, and model. He became known from the 2013 film Grean Fictions and various television roles with Nadao Bangkok. He was a member of the Thai idol group Nine by Nine, and has since released several works with Nadao Music. He is the co-founder of QOW Entertainment.

== Personal life and education ==
Krissanapoom was born on 15 August 1996 in Chiang Mai, Thailand. He is a great-grandson of former Prime Minister Plaek Phibunsongkhram. His parents are Pibulporn Pibulsonggram and Jamika Pibulsonggram, and he has a younger brother named Mahidol Pibulsonggram. He attended school at the Prince Royal's College before moving to Bangkok, where he studied and graduated from College of Social Communication Innovation, Srinakharinwirot University. He is currently in a relationship with Thai actress Kanyawee Songmuang.

In May 2026, Krissanapoom and Kanyawee Songmuang released a joint statement announcing the end of their 10-year relationship, though they confirmed they remain good friends and will continue to manage their agency, QOW Entertainment, together.

Krissanapoom is vocal on social media over his criticisms of the Thai government's response to the 2020–2021 Thai protests and its handling of the COVID-19 pandemic. Thai news agency The Standard recognized him as one of the "Powerful Voices in Crisis" for his influence on the new generation of pop culture fans to actively use social media to raise social and political issues.

== Career ==
=== 2013–2017: Early acting roles ===
He first became known among online social media users following a modelling event for CentralPlaza Chiang Mai Airport, after which he was approached by Chookiat Sakveerakul to cast for his first acting role in Grean Fictions. He then had various acting roles for television in shows such as Carabao The Series, Love Blood, Grean House The Series, Fly to Fin, and Dead Time Stories.

After signing with Nadao Bangkok in 2015, he became more widely known for his projects such as Diary of Tootsies (2016), which was followed by the web mini-series I Hate You, I Love You (2016), Diary of Tootsies Season 2 (2017), and Project S: The Series (2017). He also starred in the movie Suddenly Twenty (2016).

=== 2018–2019: Nine by Nine and Human Error ===
From 2018 to 2019, Krissanapoom took part in a special project by Nadao Bangkok and 4Nologue called Nine by Nine. The project aims to develop nine individual members into a boy group. Nine by Nine have released their mini-album in 2019 composed of five songs: "Night Light", "Hypnotize", "The Lucky One", "Shouldn't", and "Eternity". The members also starred as main roles in the television series In Family We Trust (2018) and Great Men Academy (2019).

After the Nine by Nine project, Krissanapoom was tapped for another project called "Human Error" in partnership of GMM Grammy, LINE TV and Nadao Music with his co-members in Nine by Nine namely, Paris Intarakomalyasut (Ice) and Chonlathorn Kongyingyong (Captain). He sang "Empty King" and starred in a short film entitled Blue as part of the project.

=== 2020–2021: Nadao Music ===
In 2020, Nadao Music paired him with Paris Intarakomalyasut to form a duo named Jaylerr x Paris (later known as Jaylerr x Ice Paris). As of July 2021, the duo has made three original songs under the label namely, "Unexpected", "Nude", and "Feels Like a Year". They also appeared in an online web musical series entitled Jaylerr x Ice Paris Studio Session where they covered songs from other Thai music artists.

As a soloist, he has released his first EP entitled PASSION + PATIENCE on 1 October 2020, with an exclusive release deal with Apple Music. He said that the title of the album, with the words "passion" and "patience" drive him throughout his career. He further says that by doing things with passion and having patience to reach every goal he has set. The album has five songs in it such as "Nimman", "Very Very Sorry", "Balcony", "Your Number", and "Celebrate!", all written and composed by Krissanapoom.

In September 2021, Krissanapoom announced that he terminated his contract with Nadao Music to explore more musical and artistic styles. His duo with Paris was also discontinued as a result. He briefly stayed as an artist under Nadao Bangkok, until December 2021.

=== 2022–present: QOW Entertainment ===
After his departure from Nadao Bangkok, Krissanapoom has announced that together with his girlfriend Kanyawee, they have formed their own entertainment and talent agency named QOW Entertainment. The agency will be handling the pair's local and international projects. They have collaborated with 4Nologue CEO Anuwat Wichiennarat to co-manage and further expand the agency in hopes of hiring more artists in the coming years.

In 2022, he is set to play the lead role in Forbidden, the first Thai-language original series from HBO Asia. The series has been selected to premiere at the 26th Busan International Film Festival.

On 1 October, Krissanapoom released his collaborative single with the Thai girl group 4EVE, entitled "My Duty". This is his first single under QOW Entertainment.

== Filmography ==
=== Films ===
Year	Title	Role	Notes
2013	Grean Fictions	Oat	Main role
2013	Change	Jay	Short film
2014	About Us	Teh	Short film
2016	Charming Person 2	JJ	Short film
2016	Suddenly Twenty	Boom	Main role
2019	BLUE	J	Human Error short film
2019	Tootsies and The Fake	Top	Supporting role
2023	Inhuman Kiss: The Last Breath	Cloud	Main role

=== Television series ===
Year	Title	Role	Network	Notes
2013	Carabao The Series	Deity	MCOT HD	Episode 16 (Young Suphan)
2014-2016	Love Blood	Gao	Workpoint TV	Main role
2014-2015	Grean House The Series	Oat	MCOT HD	Main role
2015	Fly to Fin	Keen	True4U	Main role
2015	Wifi Society	Nam	GMM 25	Episode 18 (Little Light)
2015	Dead Time Stories	Non	GMM 25	Main role
2016	Diary of Tootsies The Series	Top	GMM 25	Supporting role
2016	Fire Escape	Marvin	True4U	Main role
2016	Views of Love: The Series	Peh	PPTV 36	Episode 6 (Poom's Footprints)
2017	Allergic to Bangkok	Mai	GMM 25	Lost in Khiriwong
2017	Diary of Tootsies The Series Season 2	Top	GMM 25	Supporting role
2017	Project S: The Series - Shoot! I Love You	Shan	GMM 25	Main role
2018	In Family We Trust	Poompat Jiraanan (Pete)	One 31	Main role
2019	Great Men Academy	Pakorn Chintaphaisali (Tangmo)	One 31	Main role
2020	Angel Beside Me	Mikael Lansaladon Aekisna Ares (Somchai)	GMM 25	Main role
2021	#Hatetag	Himself	Amarin TV	Episode 10 (Cyber Exposure)
2022	Forbidden	TBA	HBO Asia	Main role
2023	Analog Squad	Keg / Mon	Netflix	Main role
2024	Spare Me Your Mercy	Pol.Capt. Wasan's Khambunrueang (Thiu)	One 31, iQIYI and YouTube	Main role

=== Web series ===
Year	Title	Role	Platform	Notes
2016	I Hate You, I Love You	Tiger	Line TV	Main role
2018	Into the Light with 9x9	Himself	Line TV	Musical series
2019	The Journey of 9x9 Documentary	Himself	Line TV	
2020	Quarantine Stories	Got	YouTube	Episode 6 (CLOSE FRIEND)

== Discography ==
Year	Song Title	Album	Ref.
2017	"Make It Right!" with BamBam, Captain, Best Nutthasit, Mild, Ud Awat	Single	
2018	"Night Light"	Nine by Nine (en Route)	
2018	"Hypnotize"	Nine by Nine (en Route)	
2019	"The Lucky One"	Nine by Nine (en Route)	
2019	"Shouldn't"	Nine by Nine (en Route)	
2019	"Eternity"	Nine by Nine (en Route)	
2019	"Empty King"	Single	
2020	"Unexpected" with Ice Paris	Single	
2020	"Hug In Mind" as featured artist	Single	
2020	"One Million Hugs" with Billkin, Pearwah, Ice Paris, Captain, Nana	Single	
2020	"Nimman"	PASSION + PATIENCE	
2020	"Very Very Sorry"	PASSION + PATIENCE	
2020	"Balcony"	PASSION + PATIENCE	
2020	"Your Number"	PASSION + PATIENCE	
2020	"Celebrate!"	PASSION + PATIENCE	
2020	"Nude" with Ice Paris	Single	
2021	"Feels Like A Year" with Ice Paris	Single	
2022	"My Duty" with 4EVE	Single	
