= Waruntorn Paonil =

Thai singer and actress (born 1994)

Waruntorn Paonil วรันธร เปานิล
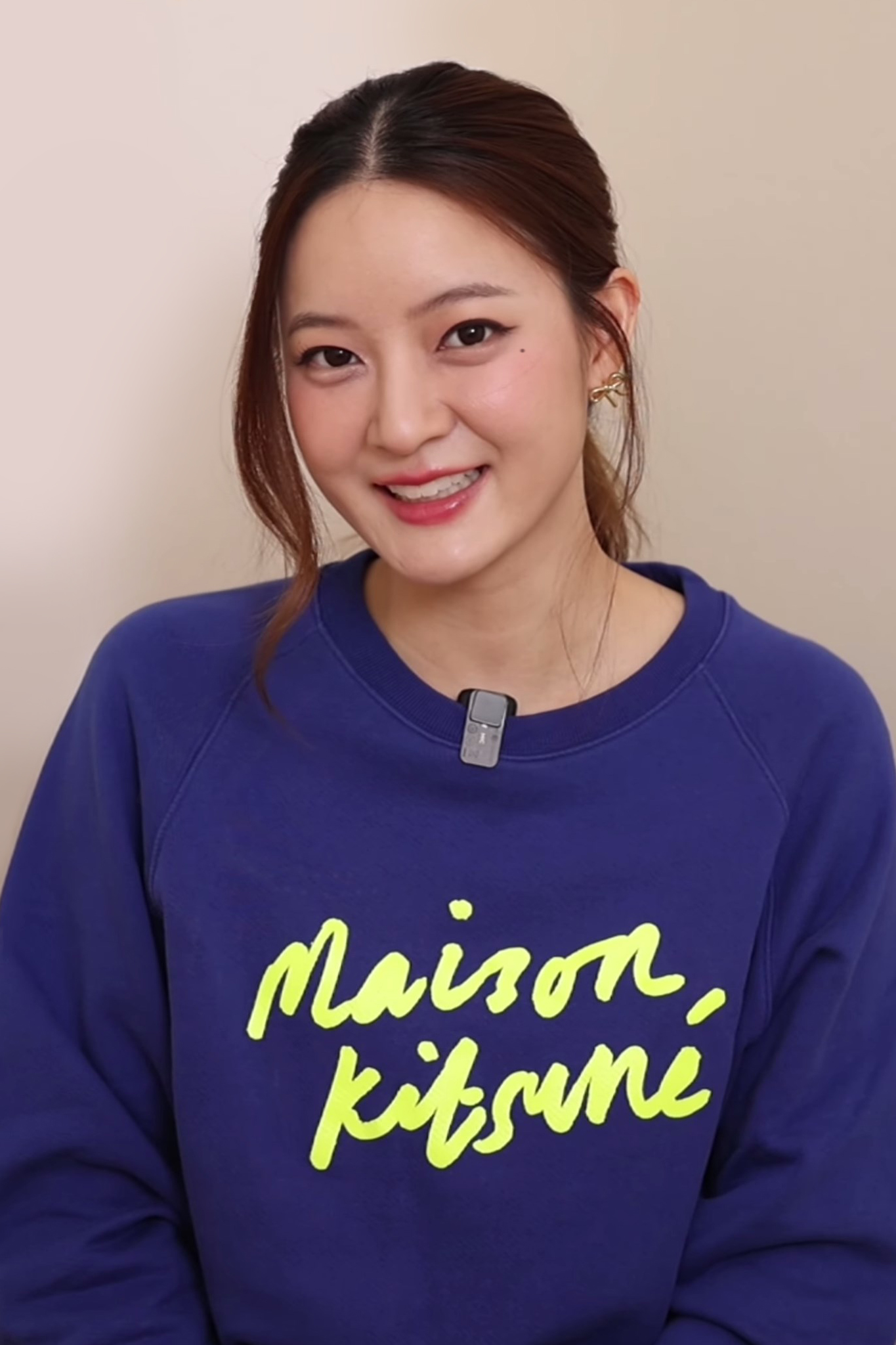
- Waruntorn in 2024

Background information
- Born: 23 February 1994 (age 32); Bangkok, Thailand
- Genre: Synth-pop
- Instruments: Vocal; digital keyboard
- Years active: 2006–present
- Labels: Kamikaze (2006–2009); Boxx Music (2015–present)

Waruntorn Paonil (Note: Thai: วรันธร เปานิล, RTGS: Waranthon Paonin, Thai pronunciation: [wá.ran.tʰɔːn paw.nin]) (born 23 February 1994), nicknamed Ink (Note: Thai: อิ้งค์, RTGS: Ing, Thai pronunciation: [ʔíŋ]), also known by the stage name Ink Waruntorn, is a Thai singer, actress, and voice actress.

In 2006, she began her career with a role in a music video, before becoming a member of the pop group Chilli White Choc, which she left in 2009. In 2015, she returned as a solo artist and also took a lead role in the political romance film Snap. Her first solo single, "Insomnia", went to number one on music charts in Thailand.

In 2020, she was given the Mnet Asian Music Award for Best Asian Artist. The following year, she started her voice acting career with the title role in the animation The Legend of Hei.

== Personal life ==
After completing her secondary education at Srinakharinwirot University Prasarnmit Demonstration School, Waruntorn became a student at the Musical Department of the Faculty of Fine and Applied Arts, Chulalongkorn University, where she majored in classical singing (opera). During her study at Chulalongkorn, she also served as the university drum major for the 70th Chula–Thammasat Traditional Football Match in 2015. She completed her study in 2016 and was conferred with a Bachelor of Arts in Music (Second-Class Honours). Before graduation, she held a one-hour solo opera concert called Senior Voice Recital at her university on 27 April 2016.

== Career ==
In 2006, Waruntorn started her career at the age of 12 by starring in the music video of Four-Mod's "Dek Wunwai" (Thai: เด็กวุ่นวาย). In the same year, she became an artist under RS Music's Kamikaze. The following year, she debuted as a member of the girl group Chilli White Choc. She left the group in 2009, citing study reasons.

In 2015, she returned with a lead role in the political romance film Snap and became a solo artist under Boxx Music. The next year, she released her first single, "Insomnia". The song "Insomnia" went number one on the Cat Radio chart and the Fungjai chart and was listed as one of the Top 50 Thai Songs of the Year by Joox.

She released her first extended play in 2017, called Bliss, containing all of the songs from her first five singles.

During her concert called Secret Between Us on 14 September 2019, she revealed to the audience that she was four days ago diagnosed with a "large, harmful uterine fibroid". After the concert, she received a surgical procedure and took a break for recuperation from 21 October to 22 November 2019.

In 2021, she started her voice acting career with the title role in the Chinese animation The Legend of Hei, for which she also sang the theme song.

== Filmography ==
=== Films ===
Year	Title	Role	Notes	References
2015	Snap (Thai: Snap แค่...ได้คิดถึง)	Phueng (Thai: ผึ้ง)		
2021	The Legend of Hei	Hei or Luo Xiaohei	Voice	
2021	On Vacation (Thai: อร Vacation)	On (Thai: อร)	Produced by Tourism Authority of Thailand	
2022	Faces of Anne (Thai: แอน)	Anne		
2023	Wish	Asha	Voice	
2026	In The Name of Love (Thai: อัศจรรย์วันทอง)	Pimmada / Wanthong (Thai: พิมพ์มาดา / วันทอง)		

=== Series ===
Year	Title	Role	Network	Reference
2024	Tomorrow and I	Kanitthaphada Somphong Na Dara	Netflix	

=== TV Shows ===
Year	Title	Network	Notes	Reference
2026	Running Man Thailand	One31, IQIYI	A Thai licensed version from South Korean TV Show Running Man	

== Discography ==
No.	Year	Title	Notes	References
1	2016	"Insomnia" (Thai: เหงาเหงา)		
2	2016	"Snap"		
3	2017	"Cloudy" (Thai: ฉันต้องคิดถึงเธอแบบไหน)		
4	2017	"You?" (Thai: เกี่ยวกันไหม)		
5	2018	"Old Feelings" (Thai: ยังรู้สึก)		
6	2018	"Secret" (Thai: ความลับมีในโลก)		
7	2019	"Glad" (Thai: ดีใจด้วยนะ)		
8	2019	"Stay" (Thai: รอหรือพอ)		
9	2019	"Call Me" (Thai: ไม่อยากเหงาแล้ว)	Featuring Meyou	
10	2020	"Erase" (Thai: ลบไม่ได้ช่วยให้ลืม)		
11	2020	"Repeat" (Thai: อยากเริ่มต้นใหม่กับคนเดิม)		
12	2021	"Eyes Don't Lie" (Thai: สายตาหลอกกันไม่ได้)		
13	2021	"Expert" (Thai: เก่งแต่เรื่องคนอื่น)	Featuring Sprite	
14	2022	"Goodbye" (Thai: กลับก่อนนะ)		
15	2022	"Ink"		
16	2022	"Chop Yu Khon Diao" (Thai: ชอบอยู่คนเดียว)		
17	2022	"Lok Thi Yang Mi Thoe Yu Duai Kan" (Thai: โลกที่ยังมีเธออยู่ด้วยกัน)		
18	2023	"Khon Mai Khao Dulae Yu" (Thai: คนใหม่เขาดูแลอยู่)		
19	2023	"Pit Thong Lang Chai" (Thai: ปิดทองหลังใจ)		
20	2024	"So What?" (Thai: แล้วยังไงต่อ)		
21	2024	"Phop Rak" (Thai: พบรัก)		
22	2024	"Phap Thi Suai Thi Sut" (Thai: ภาพที่สวยที่สุด)		
23	2025	"Sak Wan Chan Cha Hai Di" (Thai: สักวันฉันจะหายดี)		
24	2025	"Fak Chai" (Thai: ฝากใจ)		
25	2025	"Kit-thueng Thoe Klang-wan, Fan Thueng Thoe Klang-kuen" (Thai: คิดถึงเธอกลางวัน ฝันถึงเธอกลางคืน)		
26	2026	"Ab Rak Dai Som-boon Bab" (Thai: แอบรักได้สมบูรณ์แบบ)	Featuring Fellow Fellow	
27	2026	"Jum Wai" (Thai: จำไว้)		
28	2026	"Love Effects" (Thai: ผลข้างเคียง)	Featuring Billkin	
29	2026	"Last Goodbye" (Thai: ทิ้งเธอไว้ในปีนี้)		

=== Studio albums ===
Year	Title	References
2022	Ink	
2025	Bold	

=== Extended plays ===
Year	Title	References
2017	Bliss	
2022	Bloom	

=== OST songs ===
Year	Title	OST	Notes	References
2017	"Plian" (Thai: เปลี่ยน)	Bbetter (Thai: ทูบีเบทเทอร์)		
2018	"Lok Thi Mai Mi Thoe" (Thai: โลกที่ไม่มีเธอ)	7 Days (Thai: เรารักกัน จันทร์–อาทิตย์)		
2018	"Ru Khae Huachai" (Thai: รู้แค่หัวใจ)	Gravity of Love (Thai: รักแท้...แพ้แรงดึงดูด)		
2021	"Yut Thi Thoe" (Thai: หยุดที่เธอ)	The Legend of Hei (Thai: เฮย ภูตแมวมหัศจรรย์)		
2021	"La La Loi" (Thai: ลาลาลอย)	On Vacation (Thai: อร Vacation)	Featuring Thanapob Leeratanakachorn	
2022	"Tha Thoe Rak Khrai Khon Nueng" (Thai: ถ้าเธอรักใครคนหนึ่ง)	Love Destiny: The Movie		
2025	"Distrust" (Thai: ไม่ไว้ใจ)	Until The Sun Meets The Star (Thai: เมื่อตะวันลับฟ้าก็จะเป็นเวลาของดวงดาว)		
2026	"Duek Laew" (Thai: ดึกแล้ว)	In The Name of Love (Thai: อัศจรรย์วันทอง)	Featuring Youngohm	

=== Other songs ===
Year	Title	Notes	References
2005	"Kon Mali Ban" (Thai: ก่อนมะลิบาน)	Singing the choral parts; the main artist is Time	
2020	"Choe Tae Khon Chairai" (Thai: เจอแต่คนใจร้าย)	Featuring Lipta	
2020	"Rangwan Dae Khon Chang Fan" (Thai: รางวัลแด่คนช่างฝัน)	Featuring Season Five	
2021	"Plae Mai Ok" (Thai: แปลไม่ออก)	Featuring Billkin	
2021	"Phloe Rue Tangchai" (Thai: เผลอหรือตั้งใจ)		
2021	"Have a Blendy Day"	For commercials of Blendy, a beverage brand debuted by Ajinomoto	
2021	"Hai Chan Yu Khang Khang Mai" (Thai: ให้ฉันอยู่ข้าง ๆ ไหม)		
2022	"Tell U Somethin'" (Thai: เธอ ๆ เรามีอะไรจะบอก)	With other Boxx Music artists	
2022	"Last Train"	Featuring Three1989	
2022	"Let Me Love You" (Thai: ถ้าเธอไม่อยากโชคร้ายเรื่องความรัก)	Featuring Tanont Chumroen	
2023	"My Energy" (Thai: เธอคือพลังของฉัน)	Featuring Thongchai McIntyre	
2024	"Lucky You"	Featuring 4Eve	
2024	"Mai Mi Khrai Ru" (Thai: ไม่มีใครรู้)	Featuring Fellow Fellow	
2025	"Greenlight"	Featuring BamBam	

== Concerts ==
Title	Date(s)	Venue	Notes	References
Secret Between Us	14–15 September 2019	Voice Space, Bangkok	First full concert, sold out	
Inksyland (Thai: ดินแดนขยี้ใจ)	22 October 2022	Impact Arena	Sold out	
Ink Waruntorn ‘Close Up’ Concert	3–7 July 2024	Siam-Pic Ganesha Hall	Sold out	
Ink Waruntorn '10th Anniversary' Concert (Thai: สิบปีว่าไม่เท่าตาเห็น)	2–3 August 2025	Impact Arena	Sold out	
Ink Waruntorn 'Synthphony' Concert	3–4 October 2026; 24 December 2026 (Restage)	UOB Live	Sold out	

== Awards and nominations ==
Year	Award	Category	Work	Result	References
2016	6th Thai Film Director Association Awards	Best Lead Actress	Snap	Nominated	
2016	10th Asian Film Awards	Best Newcomer	Snap	Nominated	
2016	13th Kom Chad Luek Awards	Best Lead Actress	Snap	Nominated	
2016	13th Starpics Thai Film Awards	Best Lead Actress	Snap	Nominated	
2016	24th Bangkok Critics Assembly Awards	Best Lead Actress	Snap	Nominated	
2016	25th Suphannahong National Film Awards	Best Lead Actress	Snap	Nominated	
2017	2017 Joox Thailand Music Awards	Indie Song of the Year	"Insomnia"	Nominated	
2018	2018 Joox Thailand Music Awards	Indie Song of the Year	"You?"	Nominated	
2019	2020 Joox Thailand Music Awards	Indie Song of the Year	"Glad"	Won	
2020	2020 Line TV Awards	Best Song	"Glad"	Nominated	
2020	2020 Mnet Asian Music Awards	Best Asian Artist		Won	
2021	2021 MTV Europe Music Awards	Best Southeast Asian Act		Nominated	
2022	2022 Joox Thailand Music Awards	Artist of the Year		Nominated	
2022	2022 Joox Thailand Music Awards	Song of the Year	"Eyes Don't Lie"	Nominated	
2022	2022 Joox Thailand Music Awards	Pop Song of the Year	"Eyes Don't Lie"	Nominated	
2022	The Guitar Mag Awards 2021	Best Female Artist of the Year		Won	
2026	14th Thailand Social Awards	Best Entertainment Figures on Social Media – Solo Female Artist		Won	
2026	The Guitar Mag Awards 2026	Best Female Artist of The Year		Won	
2026	The Guitar Mag Awards 2026	Best Album of The Year	BOLD	Won	
2026	TOTY MUSIC AWARDS 2025	The Best Solo Artist of The Year		Won	
2026	TOTY MUSIC AWARDS 2025	The Most Popular Female Artist of The Year	"Sak Wan Chan Cha Hai Di"	Won	
2026	Kazz Awards 2026	People Of The Year		Won	
2026	Kazz Awards 2026	Hottest TV Program Award	Running Man Thailand	Won	
