= Atchareeya Potipipittanakorn =

Thai actress

- อัจฉรียา โพธิพิพิธธนากร
- Born: 4 November 1995 (age 30); Thailand
- Other name: Prim (ปริม)
- Occupation: Actress
- Years active: 2018–present

Atchareeya Potipipittanakorn (Thai: อัจฉรียา โพธิพิพิธธนากร; born November 04, 1995) is a Thai actress.

== Filmography ==
=== Television series ===
Year	Title	Role
2018	Girl from Nowhere	Sa (Ep. 9)
2019	Luk Krung	Kaewta
2020	My Name Is Busaba	Noei
2021	Boss & Me	May
2022	The Curse of Saree	Nalinee
2023	23:23	Jenjira
2023	Return Man	Nedkamol
2024	Our Destined Love	Jampa
2024	Legend of the Hidden Land	Grey-haired demon
2024	Marital Justice	Wi Wirongrong (Paralegal)
2024	Doctor Climax	Young Korapin (Ep. 7)
2024	Spare Me Your Mercy	Rin Suphaphorn Duangnet (Doctor)
2025	Homeroom	Wira Watcharakit (English Teacher)
2025	Rabbit on the Moon	Maprang
2025	9 Years of You	Napduean
2026	Sunset in Winter	Krathin
2026	The Evil Lawyer	Ang

=== Film ===
Year	Title	Role
2019	Tee Shot: Ariya Jutanugarn	
2022	Faces of Anne	Anne
2024	Bangkok Breaking: Heaven and Hell	Waew
