= The Evil Lawyer =

- Also known as: Thanai Pisat
- Genre: Legal drama Crime thriller
- Created by: Jakkarin Thepvong
- Written by: Jakkarin Thepvong; Sureechay Kaewses; Pannaporn Watthanapong; Usicha Udomsak; Sopana Chaowwiwatkul; Nottapon Boonprakob
- Directed by: Nottapon Boonprakob; Jakkarin Thepvong
- Starring: Rhatha Phongam; Nat Kitcharit; Atchareeya Potipipittanakorn
- Country of origin: Thailand
- Original language: Thai
- No. of seasons: 1
- No. of episodes: 8

Production
- Producer: Songphon Jantharasom
- Editors: Peeradol Amarin; Natthaphon Timmuang; Ittiwat Poobandit
- Running time: 40–67 minute

Original release
- Network: Netflix
- Release: June 11, 2026

The Evil Lawyer (Thai: ทนายปีศาจ; RTGS: Thanai Pisat) is a 2026 Thai legal drama television series directed by Nottapon Boonprakob and Jakkarin Thepvong. It premiered worldwide on Netflix on 11 June 2026.

== Plot ==
Mek, a young lawyer who believes in justice and the rule of law, is accused of murdering the son of a powerful police chief. Facing a corrupt legal system and overwhelming evidence against him, he reluctantly accepts help from Jittri, a ruthless defense lawyer infamous for exploiting legal loopholes and defending guilty clients. As they work together to uncover the truth, both lawyers are forced to confront the moral boundaries of justice.

== Cast ==
=== Main ===
- Rhatha Phongam as Jittri
- Nat Kitcharit as Mek Piriyawich
- Atchareeya Potipipittanakorn as Ang

=== Support ===
- Songsit Roongnophakunsri as Anan Methaneepaisal
- Phollawat Manuprasert as Rit Piriyawich
- Paopetch Charoensook as Techin Methaneepaisal
- Sarinrat Thomas as Atchara
- Popetorn Soonthornyanakij as Chanon
- Nopachai Jayanama as Kosol
- Jutamanee Chaimongkol as Yupin
- Niran Santhanawit as Lawyer Tong
- Sornchai Chatwiriyachai as Attorney Tom
- Natthakritta Techvitul as Manow
- Worakorn Amrittanathithorn as Boonlue
- Kittikun Chattongkum as Aon
- Wanchai Thanawangnoi as Por
- Prachitpon Tangsritrakul as Padung
- Somporn Pongsajapan as Anan's Fathers-in-law
- Chartchai Ketnust as Judge Yuthana
- Phunthida Phairuangkij as Nay Oo
- Kanokphon Phithakhongsa as Nee An
- Pansakorn Teekarungruang as Seya
- Montree Saengmanee as Sorn
- Teerasak Pannonta as Suwat
- Ongart Cheamcharoenpornkul as Chai
- Suthida Jantrabutr as Pawaree (Pang)
- Sawanee Navinthananchai as Aunt Noi
- Sira Simmee as Kang
- Grithsha Kaeosawat as Meuk
- Kanis Chansuwan as Nemo
- Natthaphong Aroonnet as Din
- Enoch Teo as Andy
- Kwantip Devakula as Court Bail Clerk
- Thanyarat Panya as Young Jittri
- Suppakit Wongsa as Young Mek
- Nion Cheewincherdchai as Wimol (Mek's Mother)
- Wongsakorn Temayung as Mai
- Phatcharapon Jangdee as Mai's Sister
- Kengkardd Jongjaipra as Abbot
- Sarinya Inger Olsson as Gynecologist
- Ploy Siriudomset as Pui
- Sunthari Chotipun as Pui's Mother
- Woradej Hongsrisuwan as Dr. Korn
- Nunthunyamon Tontanavescchkul as Dr. Korn' Wife
- Suphatchaya Janpong as Kratai (Por's Grandchild)
- Walakorn Sathitsathian as Leh

== Episodes ==
No.	Title	Original release date
1	"Allegation" (คำกล่าวหา)	June 11, 2026
2	"Testimony" (คำให้การ)	June 11, 2026
3	"Confession" (คำสารภาพ)	June 11, 2026
4	"Oath" (คำสาบาน)	June 11, 2026
5	"Denial" (คำปฏิเสธ)	June 11, 2026
6	"Falsehood" (คำลวง)	June 11, 2026
7	"Statement" (คำแถลง)	June 11, 2026
8	"Judgment" (คำพิพากษา)	June 11, 2026

== Reception ==
The Evil Lawyer received generally positive reviews from critics. On Rotten Tomatoes, the first season holds a 100% approval rating based on five critic reviews.

Lucinda Everett of The Guardian gave the series 3 out of 5 stars, praising its intricate plot, layered characters, and exploration of power, corruption, and systemic injustice, while noting that its tone could be erratic and occasionally over-the-top.

Joel Keller of Decider recommended the series, describing it as "a bit overdramatic" but praising its intriguing premise and the dynamic between the two lead lawyers.

Writing for Khaosod English, the reviewer commended the series for its morally complex portrayal of Thailand's justice system, its visual style, and its incorporation of fictional cases inspired by real-life events, although the review criticized the fast pacing and unresolved ending.
