= 2020 Joox Thailand Music Awards =

Awarding ceremony given by JOOX Thailand

4th JOOX Thailand Music Awards
- Date: 25 March 2020 (originally scheduled); 1 July 2020 (rescheduled date)
- Location: Virtual event
- Presented by: JOOX Thailand; Sanook
- Hosted by: Niti Chaichitathorn; Thanakorn Chinnakul

Highlights
- Most awards: Nichaphat Chatchaipholrat; Paris Intarakomalyasut (2 each)
- Most nominations: F.Hero (4)
- Website: joox.com/th/jtma2020

Television/radio coverage
- Network: JOOX App; Sanook.com

The 4th JOOX Thailand Music Awards was an awarding ceremony presented by JOOX Thailand, giving recognition to the Thai entertainment industry in the field of music for their achievements in the year 2019. Aside from the usual music categories, a set of lifestyle categories were also introduced for the first time in partnership with Sanook. Nominees in 12 out of 14 main categories and 5 special categories were voted upon by fans through the JOOX app while only the special categories through the Sanook website. Voting period started on 13 February 2020 at 10:00 ICT and ended on 8 March 2020 at 23:59 ICT. The nominees in the remaining 2 main categories were determined by their number of streams via the app.

Originally scheduled for Wednesday, 25 March 2020 at Central World Plaza, the awards night was postponed due to the COVID-19 pandemic. It was later held online on Wednesday, 1 July 2020 through the JOOX app and Sanook website. The event was hosted by Niti Chaichitathorn and Thanakorn Chinnakul.

== Awards ==
Nominations were announced on 12 February 2020. Winners are listed first and highlighted in bold:

=== Main (Music) ===
Song of the Year	Artist of the Year
**"ธารารัตน์" (Thararat) by YOUNGOHM**; "ถ้าฉันเป็นเขา" (Tah Chun Bpen Kao) by Indigo; "เจ็บจนพอ" (Enough) by Wanyai; "นอกจากชื่อฉัน" (Nauk Jahk Cheu Chun) by ActArt; "เสือสิ้นลาย" (Seua Sin Lai) by F.Hero ft. P-Hot, YOUNGOHM & Fymme	**Wanyai**; F.Hero; YOUNGOHM; The TOYS; Palmy
New Artist of the Year	Pop Song of the Year
**Indigo**; Paris Intarakomalyasut; Meyou; TRINITY; NICECNX	**"รักติดไซเรน" (Ruk Tid Siren) by Nichaphat Chatchaipholrat & Paris Intarakomalyasut**; "เจ็บจนพอ" (Jep Jon Por - Enough) by Wanyai; "ถ้าฉันเป็นเขา" (Tah Chun Bpen Kao) by Indigo; "ภาวนา" (Pa Wa Na) by Meyou; "ทางผ่าน" (Thang Phan - Passenger) by Pure
Hip-Hop/R&B Song of the Year	Rock Song of the Year
**"เสือสิ้นลาย" (Seua Sin Lai) by F.Hero ft. P-Hot, YOUNGOHM & Fymme**; "ธารารัตน์" (Thararat) by YOUNGOHM; "Gucci Belt" by Diamond ft. YOUNGOHM, Fiixd & Younggu; "Morning" by LazyLoxy; "หลอก" (Lok) by NICECNX	**"นอกจากชื่อฉัน" (Nauk Jahk Cheu Chun) by ActArt**; "รักมือสอง" (Ruk Meu Saung) by Bedroom Audio; "แดงกับเขียว" (Daeng Kab Kieow) by TaitosmitH; "กรรม" (Kam) by Nakharin Kingsak; "เจ็บน้อยที่สุด" (Jep Noy Tee Soot) by Zeal
Indie Song of the Year	Remake Song of the Year
**"ดีใจด้วยนะ" (Dee Jai Duey Na) by Waruntorn Paonil**; "ฝากไว้กับดาว" (Fahk Wai Gup Dao) by Whal & Dolph; "ดูดี" (Doo Dee) by Polycat; "กอดความเจ็บช้ำ" (Kot Khwam Chep Cham) by Safeplanet; "วิภาวดี" (Wi Pha Odi) by YENTED	**"หมื่นคำลา" (Muen Kham La) by Tanont Chumroen** (**Original by Fundee-Funden**); "เพื่อน" (Phuean) by Polycat (Original by Pong Pong); "ช้ำคือเรา" (Chum Keu Rao) by Som Arom (Original by Nittaya Bunsungnoen); "บางสิ่ง" (Bang Sing) by Slot Machine (Original by Moderndog); "คืนที่ดาวเต็มฟ้า" (Keun Tee Dao Dtem Fah) by Jinjett Wattanasin (Original by Pramote Wilepana)
Collaboration Song of the Year	Luk Thung/Pua Chewit of the Year
**"รักติดไซเรน" (Ruk Tid Siren) by Nichaphat Chatchaipholrat & Paris Intarakomalyasut**; "ให้นานกว่าที่เคย" (Hai Nahn Gwah Tee Koey) by Klear & Phai Phongsathon; "ลืมไป" (Leum Pai) by Wanyai & PMC; "เสือสิ้นลาย" (Seua Sin Lai) by F.Hero ft. P-Hot, YOUNGOHM & Fymme; "ถามหน่อย" (Tham Noi) by Varinz x Z Trip ft. Ponchet, Nonny9 & Kanom	**"เลิกคุยทั้งอำเภอเพื่อเธอคนเดียว" (Loek Khui Thang Amphoe Phuea Thoe Khon Diao) by Lilly ft. Kao**; "ชอบแบบนี้" (Chaup Baep Nee) by Nhamtoei Sabangbin; "บักแตงโม" (Bak Tang Mo) by Hun Naew; "งัดถั่งงัด" (Ngat Thang Ngat) by Athipdintha Chupanya; "ฝนเทลงมา" (Fon Te Long Ma) by Kanet Saloepi
International Artist of the Year	K-POP Artist of the Year
**Ariana Grande**; Khalid; Shawn Mendes; Dua Lipa; Lauv	**BLACKPINK**; BTS; EXO; GOT7; Twice
Karaoke of the Year	All Time Hits of the Year
**"ซ่อนกลิ่น" (Sorn Klin) by Palmy**; "ช้ำคือเรา" (Chum Keu Rao) by Som Arom; "ลาลาลอย" (La La Loy) by The TOYS; "รำคาญกะบอกกันเด้อ" (Ram Kan Ka Bok Kan Doe) by Lumplend Wongsaklon; "เลือกได้ไหม" (Leuak Dai Mai) by Zaza	**"เลือกได้ไหม" (Leuak Dai Mai) by Zaza**; "สองรัก" (Song Rak) by Zeal; "งมงาย" (Ngom Ngai) by Bodyslam; "ผิดที่ไว้ใจ" (Pit Tee Wai Jai) by Silly Fools; "ความคิด" (Kwahm Kit) by Apiwat Ueathavornsuk

=== Special (Lifestyle) ===
Most Stylish Male	Most Stylish Female
**Jumpol Adulkittiporn**; Teeradon Supapunpinyo; The TOYS	**Kanyawee Songmuang**; Chutimon Chuengcharoensukying; Mashannoad Suvalmas
Thailand's Male Sweetheart	Thailand's Female Sweetheart
**Krissanapoom Pibulsonggram**; Sunny Suwanmethanont; Sukollawat Kanarot	**Pimchanok Luevisadpaibul**; Waruntorn Paonil; Maylada Susri
Social Superstar
**BamBam** (**GOT7**); Palitchoke Ayanaputra; Lisa (BLACKPINK)

== Multiple nominations and awards ==
Artists that received multiple nominations
Nominations	Artist
4	F.Hero
3	Paris Intarakomalyasut
3	The TOYS
3	Wanyai
3	YOUNGOHM
2	ActArt
2	Indigo
2	Meyou
2	Nichaphat Chatchaipholrat
2	Palmy
2	Som Arom
2	TaitosmitH
2	Waruntorn Paonil
2	NICECNX
2	Zaza

Artists that received multiple awards
Wins	Artist
2	Nichaphat Chatchaipholrat
2	Paris Intarakomalyasut
