= 2018 Line TV Awards =

Awarding ceremony given by LINE TV Thailand

1st LINE TV Awards
- Date: 20 February 2018
- Location: Royal Paragon Hall, Siam Paragon, Bangkok, Thailand
- Presented by: LINE TV Thailand
- Most awards: GDH 559
- Website: linetvawards.com

The 1st LINE TV Awards was an award ceremony presented by LINE TV Thailand, recognizing the achievements of the Thai online entertainment industry in the fields of music, television, and drama in 2017.

The awards night was held at the Royal Paragon Hall, Siam Paragon, Bangkok, Thailand on Tuesday, 20 February 2018.

== Awards ==
Winners are listed first and highlighted in bold:

=== Major awards ===
Best Fight Scene	Best Song
**Project S: The Series – 'Side by Side'** **(GDH 559)**	**"Tod Tee Aow Tae Jai" by Palitchoke Ayanaputra (GMM Grammy)**
Best Viral Scene	Best Kiss Scene
**Chai Mai Jing Ying Tae** **(One31)**	**2 Moons** **(Chachi Digital Media)**
Best Couple
**Arthit – Kongpob from** **SOTUS S** **(GMMTV)**

=== Special awards ===
Top Entertainment	Most Viewed
**Take Guy Out Thailand Season 2** **(TV Thunder)**	**Diary of Tootsies 2** **(GDH 559)**
Content of the Year
**Project S: The Series – 'Side by Side'** **(GDH 559)**
