= 4nologue =

Thai media company

4nologue Co., Ltd.
- Native name: บริษัท โฟร์โนล็อค จำกัด
- Type: Private
- Industry: Event management; Record label; Talent management
- Founded: 11 May 2007; 19 years ago
- Founder: Anuwat Wichiennarat
- Headquarters: 555 Soi Ladprao 107 (Deesomchok) Ladprao Rd. Klongchan, Bangkapi, Bangkok, Thailand
- Key people: Anuwat Wichiennarat (CEO)
- Products: Media, music, events
- Number of employees: 100 (2020)
- Website: 4nologue.com

4nologue Co., Ltd. (Thai: บริษัท โฟร์โนล็อค จำกัด) (branded as 4NOLOGUE) is a Thai media company based in Bangkok. The company was founded in 2007 by Anuwat Wichiennarat, who serves as its CEO. The company began its operations as an event organizer, but from 2018 to 2024 also branched into talent management, television, and music production.

== History ==
4nologue was founded on 11 May 2007 by Anuwat Wichiennarat. The company initially specialized as an event/concert organizer for international artists performing in Thailand, especially K-pop bands including TVXQ, Big Bang and Got7. It operated at a loss during its first six years but began turning a profit in the seventh, after which it became more successful.

In 2018, the company began branching into talent management and music production, launching the boy group Nine by Nine as a pilot project in association with Nadao Bangkok. After the project concluded in 2019, the company debuted its new boy band Trinity, comprising four of Nine by Nine's members.

Company CEO Anuwat planned to further develop Thai male and female idol groups and introduce them to international markets.

On 29 February 2024, 4nologue announced the expiry of all Trinity members' contracts, as well as the termination of all its remaining artists. It would continue in the events organization business.

== Artists ==
=== Nine by Nine ===
Nine by Nine was a one-year special project launched in November 2018, in association with Nadao Bangkok. The group members starred in two Thai television series In Family We Trust (2018) and Great Men Academy (2019).

=== Trinity ===
Trinity is a Thai pop boy band formed in 2019. The group is composed of Sivakorn Adulsuttikul, Lapat Ngamchaweng and Jackrin Kungwankiatichai; former member Teeradon Supapunpinyo departed from the group in August 2021.

=== DVI ===
DVI (Thai: ดี-วาย di-wai), standing for Dreamvolution, was a Thai pop boy band that was announced at Octopop 2022 at the Rajamangala National Stadium on 16 October 2022. DVI debuted with their first single "Sugar" on 30 January 2023.

The group consisted of six members: Palot Chinwongso (Frank), Pitipat Thanasanpaiboon (Cheetah), Chinadis Weangwises (Tang), Samuth Kaewwan (Samui), Thanaphum Sestasittikul (Auau), and Suppakarn Jirachotikul (Por). All of the members except Tang had been contestants on Laz Icon (2022).

The group collaborated with the Japanese boy band Psychic Fever from Exile Tribe, releasing their single "To the Top" in February. DVI also went to Japan to perform at the Battle of Tokyo: Code of Jr.Exile 5-day concert event, held at Saitama Super Arena on 21–23 July, and at Kyocera Dome Osaka on 29–30 July.

DVI released their singles "Second Chance" on 18 July 2023 and "เพื่อน (แอบ) รัก - Close(d) Friend" on 1 February 2024. The group was disbanded after 4nologue announced the decision to terminate the contracts of all members on 29 February 2024.

=== bXd ===
bXd (Born Never Die) was a Thai pop girl group that debuted in January 2023 with "Just Dance" as a debut song. Before that, at OCTOPOP 2022, they were introduced as one of the new groups under 4NOLOGUE. Their social media opened at the same time, including the video introducing the group. This group had 5 members; all of them were a trainees since 2020. The members were: Charisar Oldham (Chari), Chawanluk Kungwankiatichai (Amy), Natchanok Phungtham (MiUMiU), Rinrada Sinchai (Primy) and Saruda Srinarong (S.NY). The group was disbanded after 4nologue announced the decision to terminate the contracts of all members on 29 February 2024.
