= Great Men Academy =

Thai TV series

- Original title: Great Men Academy สุภาพบุรุษสุดที่เลิฟ
- Genre: Fantasy; Romance; Comedy
- Written by: List of writers: Wanwea Hongvivatana; Weawwan Hongvivatana; Phakphumi Vibunronrong; Natcha Kittimongkholchai; Thanaphol Chaowanich; Kriangkrai Vachiratamporn; Tossaphon Riantong; Tanida Hantaweewatana
- Directed by: Wanwea Hongvivatana; Weawwan Hongvivatana
- Starring: Chanyapuk Numprasop; Teeradon Supapunpinyo; Krissanapoom Pibulsonggram; Paris Intarakomalyasut; Chonlathorn Kongyingyong; Jackrin Kungwankiatichai; Lapat Ngamchaweng; Sivakorn Adulsuttikul
- Theme music composer: Terdsak Janpan
- Ending theme: The Lucky One by Nine by Nine
- Country of origin: Thailand
- Original language: Thai
- No. of episodes: 8

Production
- Producers: Songyos Sugmakanan; Kriangkrai Vachiratamporn
- Editor: Foolhouse Production
- Running time: 75 minutes
- Production companies: Nadao Bangkok; Line Thailand

Original release
- Network: Line TV; One31
- Release: 6 February – 27 March 2019

Great Men Academy (Thai: Great Men Academy สุภาพบุรุษสุดที่เลิฟ; RTGS: ...Suphapburut Sut Thi [Love], lit. "Great Men Academy Gentleman in Love") is a 2019 Thai drama series starring Chanyapuk Numprasop, Teeradon Supapunpinyo, Krissanapoom Pibulsonggram, Lapat Ngamchaweng, Chonlathorn Kongyingyong, Jackrin Kungwankiatichai, Sivakorn Adulsuttikul, and Paris Intarakomalyasut. It aired on LINE TV from February 6 to March 27, 2019 and has 8 episodes. The series is produced by Nadao Bangkok and Line Thailand, and written & directed by Wanwea and Weawwan Hongvivatana.

Seven of the nine members of Nine by Nine appeared in this series, namely as Teeradon, Krissanapoom, Paris, Chonlathorn, Sivakorn, Lapat, and Jackrin. It is the second television series project of the group after In Family We Trust (2018).

== Plot ==
Love (Chanyapuk Numprasop) has always been a fan of the popular guy Vier (Paris Intarakomalyasut) of the famous all boys high school Great Men Academy, but she has never had the chance to meet him. One day, she sees the mystical unicorn rumored to fulfill wishes and wished for her love for Vier to get a chance.

Unfortunately, the unicorn interpreted her wishes in a different way and Love wakes up to find herself in a male's body. She is able to switch between genders under the condition that she must return as a girl before midnight each night. Love attends Great Men Academy as a guy, and works through the complications of winning Vier's heart and meeting new people while trying to keep her identity a secret.

== Cast ==
=== Main characters ===
- Chanyapuk Numprasop as Tawanwat Phongwilai (Love (Woman)/Mon)
- Teeradon Supapunpinyo as Tawanwat Phongwilai (Love (Man))
- Krissanapoom Pibulsonggram as Pakorn Chintaphaisali (Tangmo)
- Paris Intarakomalyasut as Sivakorn Wisetphiriya (Vier)
- Narikun Ketprapakorn as Mahatmutra Phisutmaitri (Rose)
- Chonlathorn Kongyingyong as Mahatmutra Phisutmaitri (Sean)
- Sivakorn Adulsuttikul as Phasu Wisaisombun (Good)
- Lapat Ngamchaweng as Napat Mahasal (Nuclear)
- Jackrin Kungwankiatichai as Arthit Rutrangsi (Menn)
- Wannapa Pomjanda as You
- Phakamas Pomjanda as Me

=== Supporting characters ===
- Smith Arayaskul as Phon Wisetphiriya/Vier's Father
- Penpak Sirikul as Love & Good's Mother
- Anorma Sarunsikarin as Teacher Kate
- Nophand Boonyai as Teacher Oh
- Nimit Luksameepong as Teacher Chang
- Nichaphat Chatchaipholrat as Som
- Atitaya Craig as Fon
- Waranya Munkaew as Aunty Phon/Director Venus
- Chayin Prasongkhuamdi as Ken

== Soundtrack ==
- Nine by Nine — ผู้โชคดี ("The Lucky One")
- mints – เหลือ ("fine.")
- Stamp – ผู้โชคดี ("The Lucky One" Stamp Version)
