= 2020 Line TV Awards =

Awarding ceremony given by LINE TV Thailand

3rd LINE TV Awards
- Date: 19 February 2020
- Location: Royal Paragon Hall, Siam Paragon, Bangkok, Thailand
- Presented by: LINE TV Thailand
- Most awards: GMMTV (4)
- Most nominations: My Ambulance (4)
- Website: linetvawards.com

The 3rd LINE TV Awards was an awarding ceremony presented by LINE TV Thailand, giving recognition to the Thai online entertainment industry in the fields of music, television and drama for their achievements in the year 2019.

The awards night was held at the Royal Paragon Hall, Siam Paragon, Bangkok, Thailand on Wednesday, 19 February 2020.

== Awards ==
Winners are listed first and highlighted in bold:

=== Major awards ===
Best Dramatic Scene	Best Comedy Scene
**He's Coming to Me** **(GMMTV)**; Bai Mai Tee Plid Plew (One31); Krong Kam (Channel 3 HD); Phrungni Cha Mai Mi Mae Leo (JSL Global Media); Leh Runchuan (Channel 8)	**Toey Tiew Thai: The Route** **(GMMTV)**; Sucker Kick (Parbdee Taweesuk); Infinite Challenge Thailand (Workpoint TV); Thong Ek Mhorya Tha Chalong (Channel 3 HD); The Face Men Thailand Season 3 (Kantana)
Best Viral Scene	Best Kiss Scene
**Great Men Academy** **(Nadao Bangkok)**; My Ambulance (Nadao Bangkok); Klin Ka Sa Long (Channel 3 HD); Montra Maha Saneh (PPTV); Krong Kam (Channel 3 HD)	**TharnType** **(One31)**; Great Men Academy (Nadao Bangkok); 3 Will Be Free (GMMTV); My Ambulance (Nadao Bangkok); The Sand Princess (GMMTV)
Best Couple	Best MC
**Khai – Third from** **Theory of Love** **(GMMTV)**; Pete – Kao from Dark Blue Kiss (GMMTV); Songpao – Mewadee from Kaew Klang Dong (Channel 3 HD); Sila – Minta from Hua Jai Sila (One31); Dao – Tiwkaow from My Ambulance (Nadao Bangkok)	**Kan Kantathavorn for** **I Can See Your Voice Thailand** / **The Mask Singer** / **10fight10** **(Workpoint TV)**; Panirin Tumwattana for Little Nirin 2 (Orangemama); Panissara Phimpru for Opal All Around 3 (Nang Maew Pa); Willy McIntosh for Hollywood Game Night Thailand Season 3 (Memiti); Kiat Kitjaroen & Sanya Kunakorn for Kik Duu (PPTV)
Best Song
**"Ruk Tid Siren" by Nichaphat Chatchaipholrat & Paris Intarakomalyasut (Nadao Music)**; "Enough" by Wanyai (LOVEiS); "Pa Wa Na" by MEYOU (GMM Grammy); "Rang Wan Plop Chai" by Zom Marie featuring LAZYLOXY (Spicydisc); "Just Wonder" by The Toys (What The Duck); "Move On" by Mean (LOVEiS); "Thang Cham Thang Prap" by Stamp featuring Youngohm & The Parkinson (123Records); "Glad" by Waruntorn Paonil (Muzik Move); "Doung Jai" by Palmy (GMM Grammy); "Tee Rak Reu Tee Pak" by Yinglee Srijumpol (GMM Grammy)

=== Special awards ===
Drama of the Year	Top Search Content of the Year
**Bai Mai Tee Plid Plew** **(One31)**	**Pen Tor** **(One31)**
Entertainment Program of the Year	Most Followers of the Year
**The Face Men Thailand Season 3** **(Kantana)**	**My Ambulance** **(Nadao Bangkok)**
Most Hearted Content of the Year
**Theory of Love** **(GMMTV)**

== Multiple awards and nominations ==
Shows that received multiple nominations
Nominations	Show/Song	Production Company
4	My Ambulance	Nadao Bangkok
2	Great Men Academy	Nadao Bangkok
2	Krong Kam	Channel 3 HD

Awards received by production company
Awards	Production Company
4	GMMTV
3	Nadao Bangkok
3	One 31
