= Teeradon Supapunpinyo =

Thai actor and singer (born 1997)

- ธีรดนย์ ศุภพันธุ์ภิญโญ
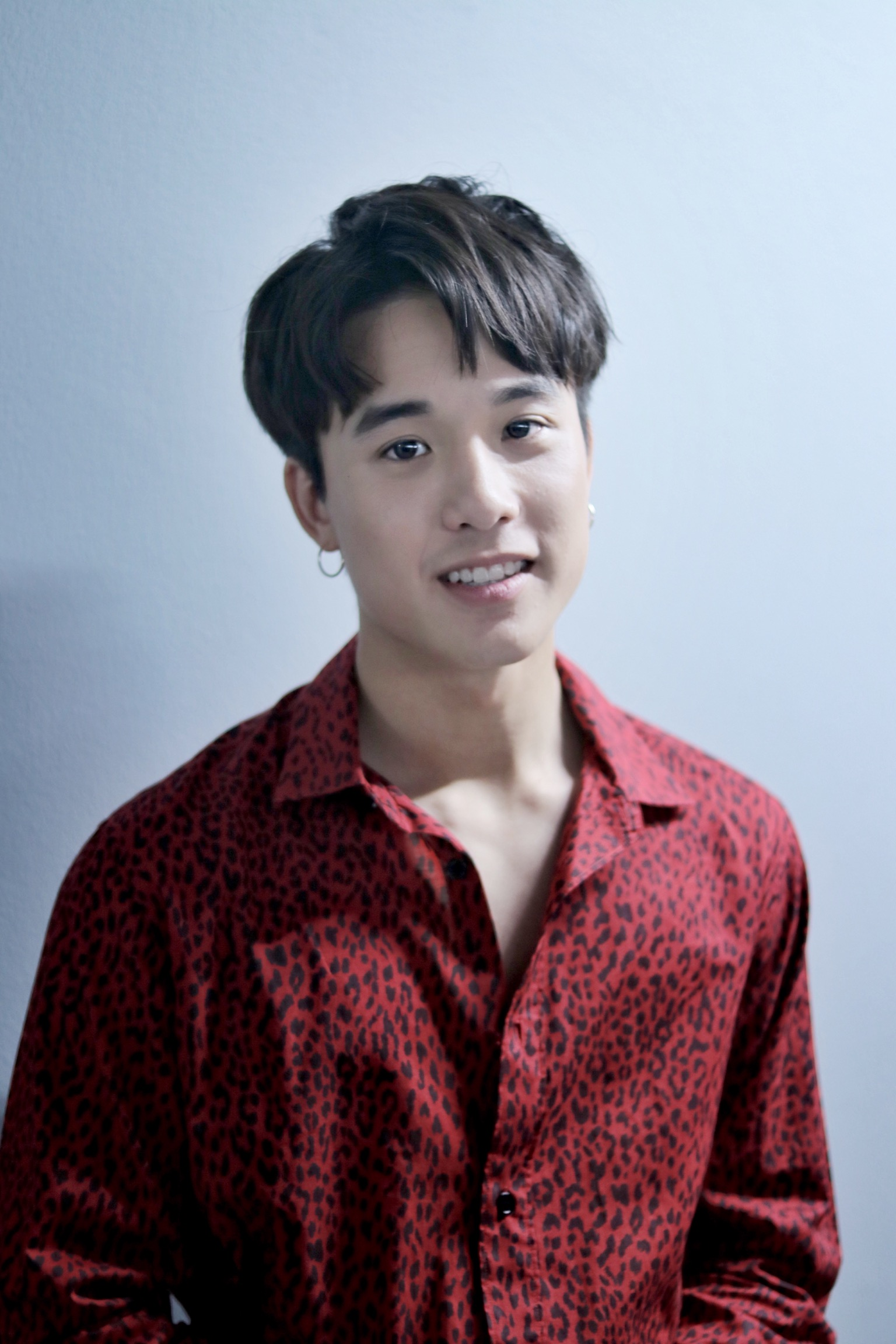
- Teeradon in 2018
- Born: 27 April 1997 (age 28); Bangkok, Thailand
- Other names: James; Jamyjames
- Education: Faculty of Journalism and Mass Communication, Thammasat University
- Occupations: Actor; singer; model
- Years active: 2014–present
- Agents: Nadao Bangkok (2014–2019); 4nologue (2019–2021)
- Musical career
- Genres: Pop; T-pop; Hip hop
- Instrument: Vocals
- Years active: 2018–2021
- Label: 4nologue
- Formerly of: Nine by Nine; Trinity

Teeradon Supapunpinyo (Thai: ธีรดนย์ ศุภพันธุ์ภิญโญ; RTGS: Thiradon Supphaphanphinyo; born 27 April 1997), also known by his nickname James, is a Thai actor, singer, and model. He became known for his role in the GTH television series Hormones, and has starred in the films Bad Genius (2017) and Homestay (2018).

== Early life and education ==
Teeradon was born on 27 April 1997. He attended primary school at Rajini School and graduated secondary school from Suankularb Wittayalai School. He attained a bachelor's degree from the Faculty of Journalism and Mass Communication, Thammasat University, graduating in 2022.

== Career ==
Teeradon began his acting career in 2014 through Hormones: The Next Gen, a talent-searching and reality TV programme produced by Nadao Bangkok (a subsidiary of GTH), which cast actors for the second and third seasons of the main Hormones series, which had been a hit the previous year. Teeradon first appeared in the series' second season as the supporting character Sun, and reprised the role as a main character in the third season. He appeared in several other TV productions by GTH and its affiliates, including the horror anthology ThirTEEN Terrors and the mini-series Stay: Saga.. Love Always in 2015, the Promlikit (Destiny) segment of the 2016 series Love Songs Love Series and its sequel in 2017.

He had his first film role in the 2017 hit Bad Genius, in which he played the character Pat. He portrayed a teenager with major depressive order in the 2017 TV series Project S, and had his first lead role in the 2018 film Homestay.

From 2018 to 2019, he performed as part of the idol group Nine by Nine, a one-year project initiated by 4Nologue. As a member of the group, he appeared in the 2018 TV series In Family We Trust and played the lead role in the 2019 series Great Men Academy. He did not renew his contract with Nadao Bangkok when it ended in 2019, opting instead to pursue singing/performing under 4nologue as part of its four-member boy band Trinity. Teeradon also appeared in the ninth season of the TV show The Mask Singer.

On 20 August 2021, Teeradon announced his departure from Trinity. He will continue his career as an artist and an actor outside of the agency.

He starred in the movie Thirteen Lives as Ekkaphon Chanthawong (Eak), the coach of the junior football team that got trapped and rescued in a cave in 2018. The production was held in Australia, with additional scenes shot in Thailand.

In 2024, he can be seen in Thai crime drama The Believers available worldwide on Netflix.

== Filmography ==
=== Films ===
Year	Title	Role	Notes
2017	Bad Genius	Pat	Nominations, Suphannahong Award and Bangkok Critics Assembly Award for Best Supporting Actor
2018	Homestay	Min	Nominations, Suphannahong Award and Bangkok Critics Assembly Award for Best Actor
2022	Haunted Universities 2nd Semester	Tan	Main role
2022	Thirteen Lives	Ekkaphon Chanthawong	Supporting role
2024	Love Stuck	Toy	

=== Television series ===
Year	Title	Role	Notes	Channel
2014	Hormones: The Next Gen	Himself	Regular member	GMM One; GTH On Air
2014–15	Hormones: The Series	Sun	Season 2 (Recurring), Season 3 (Main)	GMM One; GTH On Air
2014–15	ThirTEEN Terrors	Game	Episode "Siang Tam Sai"	GMM 25; GTH On Air
2015	Stay: Saga.. Love Always	Jeang	Main role	LINE TV; GMM 25; GTH On Air
2016	Diary of Tootsies	Barista (Ep. 3)	Guest role	GMM 25
2016	Love Songs Love Series: Destiny	Time	Main role	GMM 25
2017	Love Songs Love Series To Be Continued: Destiny	Time	Main role	GMM 25
2017	Project S: Skate Our Souls	Boo	Main role	GMM 25
2017	Project S: Shoot! I Love You	Boo (Ep. 5)	Guest role	GMM 25
2018	In Family We Trust	Vegas Jiraanan	Main role	One 31
2019	Great Men Academy	Tawanwat Phongwilai / Love	Main role	LINE TV; One 31
2019	The Stranded	Northern kid (Ep. 7)	Guest role	Netflix
2021	Girl From Nowhere Season 2	Nanai	Episode "Pregnant"	Netflix
2024	The Believers	Win	Main	Netflix
