= 2019 Line TV Awards =

Awarding ceremony given by LINE TV Thailand

2nd LINE TV Awards
- Date: 12 February 2019
- Location: Royal Paragon Hall, Siam Paragon, Bangkok, Thailand
- Presented by: LINE TV Thailand
- Most awards: GMMTV
- Website: linetvawards.com

The 2nd LINE TV Awards was an awarding ceremony presented by LINE TV Thailand, giving recognition to the Thai online entertainment industry in the fields of music, television and drama for their achievements in the year 2018.

The awards night was held at the Royal Paragon Hall, Siam Paragon, Bangkok, Thailand on Tuesday, 12 February 2019.

== Awards ==
Winners are listed first and highlighted in bold:

=== Major awards ===
Best Fight Scene	Best Song
**The Gifted** **(GMMTV)**	**"I'M OK" by Palitchoke Ayanaputra (GMM Grammy)**
Best Viral Scene	Best Kiss Scene
**Love Destiny** **(Channel 3 HD)**	**Love by Chance** **(Studio Wabi Sabi)**
Best Comedy Scene	Best Friends
**Love Destiny** **(Channel 3 HD)**	**Wake Up Ladies: The Series** **(GMMTV)**
Best Couple	Best MC
**Pick – Rome from** **Our Skyy** **(GMMTV)**; **Ae – Pete from** **Love by Chance** **(Studio Wabi Sabi)**	**Niti Chaichitathorn for** **Talk with Toey One Night** and **Yai & The Grandsons** **(GMMTV)**
Rising Star
**The Toys (What The Duck)**

=== Special awards ===
Top Entertainment	Most Viewed
**The Face Thailand Season 4** **(Kantana)**	**Mia 2018** **(One31)**
Content of the Year	Talk of the Town
**Love Destiny** **(Channel 3 HD)**	**In Family We Trust** **(Nadao Bangkok)**
