= Chayapak Tunprayoon =

Thai actor and singer (born 2000)

- ชยภัค ตันประยูร
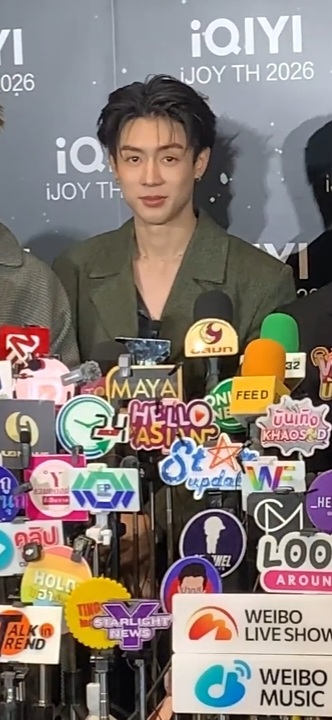
- Born: 30 October 2000 (age 26); Thailand
- Other name: New (นิว)
- Education: Srinakharinwirot University (Film and Digital Media)
- Occupations: Actor; Singer
- Years active: 2021–present
- Agent: LOOKE World

Chayapak Tunprayoon (Thai: ชยภัค ตันประยูร; born 30 October 2000), nicknamed New (Thai: นิว), is a Thai actor and singer. He is known for his roles in the television series I Promised You the Moon (2021), Thank You Teacher (2023), Ready, Set, Love (2024), and GELBOYS (2025). He won the Best Drama Song award at the 2026 Nataraja Awards.

== Early life and education ==
Chayapak completed his secondary education at Suankularb Wittayalai School and later graduated from the College of Social Communication Innovation at Srinakharinwirot University, majoring in Film and Digital Media.

== Career ==
Chayapak began his career with supporting roles in television and film productions. He also worked behind the scenes in the audiovisual industry as a casting assistant on film and television projects.

In 2025, he portrayed Fourmod, one of the lead characters in the coming-of-age series GELBOYS, directed by Naruebet Kuno.

Alongside his acting work, Chayapak released music associated with the series, including the single "Red Flag" (เลิกกั๊กแล้วรักก่อน), which served as part of the soundtrack for GELBOYS.

In 2026, he reprised his role as Fourmod in Gelboys Season 2: Fandom Status.

== Filmography ==
=== Television ===
Year	Title	Role	Notes	Network / Platform
2021	I Promised You the Moon	Au	Supporting role	LINE TV
2023	Thank You Teacher	Din	Supporting role	TrueID
2023	Don't Touch My Gang	—	Supporting role	—
2024	Ready, Set, Love	Paper	Supporting role	Netflix
2025	GELBOYS	Fourmod	Main role	One31 / iQIYI
2026	Gelboys Season 2: Fandom Status	Fourmod	Main role	iQIYI

=== Film ===
Year	Title	Role	Notes
2022	The Antique Shop	Win	Supporting role

=== Specials ===
Year	Title	Role	Notes
2021	Num Kala	Gao	Main role
2025	Charging Gel	Fourmod	
2025	Charging Gel Special Episode	Fourmod	

== Discography ==
=== Singles ===
Year	Title	Notes
2025	Red Flag (เลิกกั๊กแล้วรักก่อน)	GELBOYS soundtrack
2025	ACT ACT ACT (ติดแอ๊ค)	Solo single
2025	No-status Status (กั๊ก)	with BUS; GELBOYS soundtrack
2025	LOVEGELS	with the GELBOYS cast
2025	Roll With Me (ไปตี้)	with GELBOYS; GELTY (GELBOYS VARIETY) soundtrack
2026	Go Cute Far Far (ไปน่ารักไกล ๆ หน่อย)	with GELBOYS

== Events ==
Year	Date	Event	Venue	Notes
2025	23 March	GELBOYS would like to watch the final episode with you	Lido Connect, Bangkok	Special screening event for the season finale
2025	21 June	GELBOYS Close Fan Meeting	Union Hall, Bangkok	First official fan meeting of the main cast
2025	29 September	Diesel – Your Life in D Store Launch	Siam Paragon, Bangkok	Promotional appearance with the cast of GELBOYS

== Awards and nominations ==
Year	Award	Category	Work	Result	Ref.
2025	Mint Awards	Breakthrough Cast of the Year	GELBOYS (cast)	Won	
2026	Nataraja Awards	Best Drama Song	"Red Flag" – GELBOYS	Won	
