= Kemisara Paladesh =

Thai actress (born 1995)

- เขมิศรา พลเดช
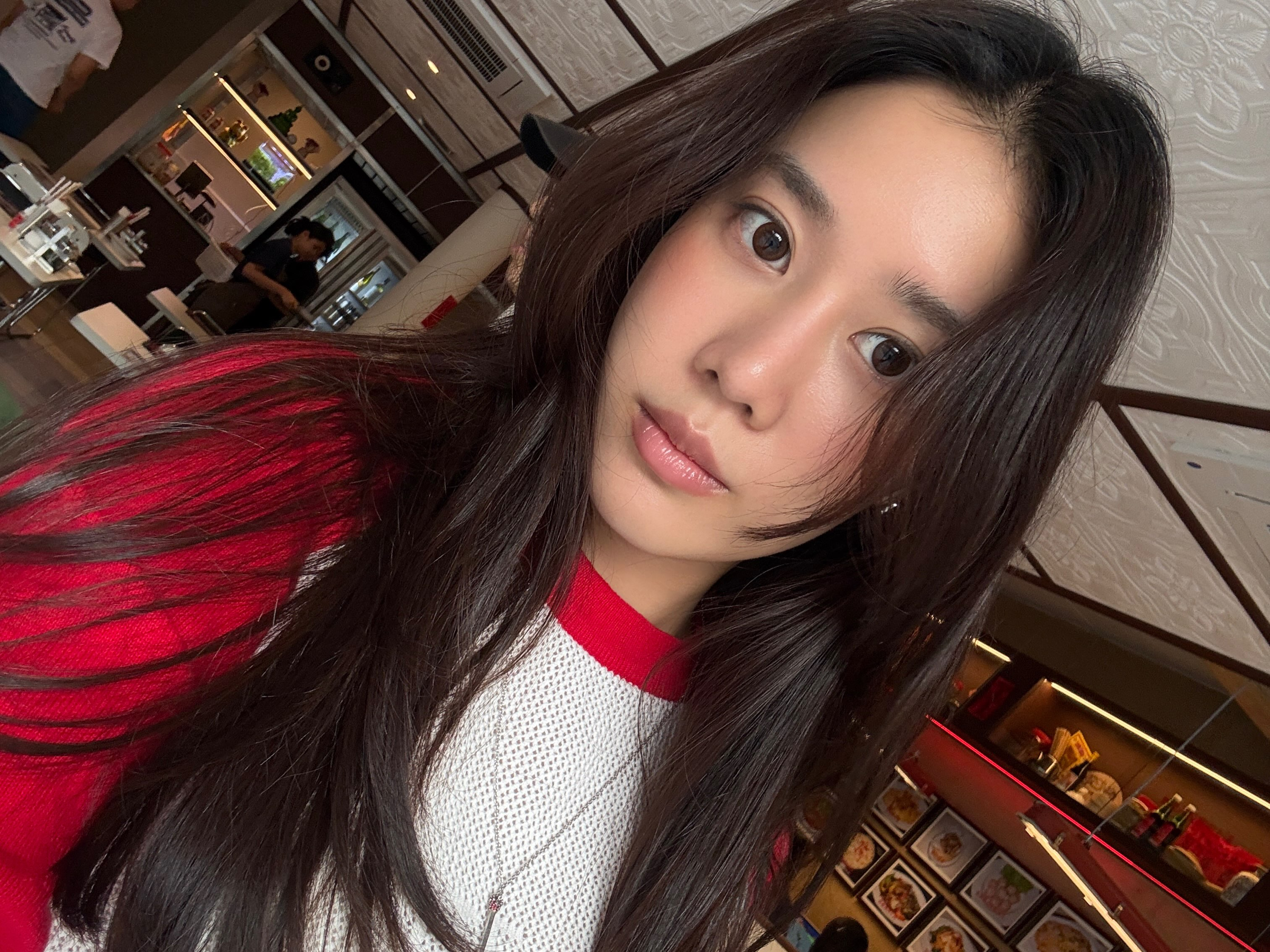
- Belle Kemisara in an Instagram post (2026)
- Born: September 16, 1995 (age 31); Bangkok, Thailand
- Other name: Belle (เบลล์)
- Education: Thammasat University (British and American Studies)
- Occupations: Actress; TV host; YouTuber
- Years active: 2011–present
- Known for: Hormones: The Series (2013–2015); Project S The Series; Ready, Set, Love (2024); ClaireBell (2025)
- Height: 1.60 m (5 ft 3 in)
- Awards: 2019 Global OTT Awards – Best Newcomer Actress

Kemisara Paladesh (Thai: เขมิศรา พลเดช, RTGS: Khemmitsara Phonladet, pronounced [kʰěːm.mít.sā.rāː pʰōn.lā.dèːt], born 16 September 1995), nicknamed Belle (Thai: เบลล์), is a Thai actress, TV host, and YouTuber. She is best known for her role as Koi from Hormones: The Series.

== Career ==
Paladesh began her career after winning the Friend For Film 'Phuean Chan Dan Hai Sut' (เพื่อนฉันดันให้สุด) contest held by GTH, and was a presenter for the studio's GTH On Air shows until 2015.

Her breakout role was Koi from Hormones: The Series (2013-2015), a character noted as one of the earliest girls' love representation on a Thai national broadcast television series, which led to a fan meet in China with her then on-screen partner, Sananthachat Thanapatpisal (Fon). She later starred in numerous television series such as Project S The Series: Side by Side (2017), Remember You (2021), Ready, Set, Love (2024), and ClaireBell (2025).

She started a YouTube channel in 2020 during the start of the COVID-19 pandemic, and earned a Silver Creator Award in June 2023.

== Personal life ==
Paladesh is the youngest child of Kematat Paladesh, former president of Bangkok Media Broadcasting and former president of MCOT Public Company Limited. She has an older brother named Kasempong Paladesh (Bezt).

She graduated from Ekamai International School and bachelor's degree at Thammasat University, majoring in British And American Studies (BAS) under the Faculty of Liberal Arts.

== Filmography ==
=== Films ===
Year	Title	Role	Notes	Ref.
2016	Kon Mee Sanay	Bell	Main	
2016	Kon Mee Sanay Part 2	Bell	Main	
2017	Smile of Tomorrow	Beam	Main	
2020	Family Gathering	Noon	Main	
2022	Haunted Universities 2nd Semester	Meen	Main	
2024	The Package	Fah	Main	

=== Short films ===
Year	Title	Role	Notes
2013	Tor Pai Mai Kong: Tiang-Kuen	Ou	

=== Television series ===
Year	Title	Role	Network	Notes	Ref.
2013	Hormones	Wiriya Korkietpirom (Koi)	ONE31	Support	
2014	Hormones Season 2	Wiriya Korkietpirom (Koi)	ONE31	Main	
2014	ThirTEEN Terrors	Aim	GMM25	Main: Episode 3	
2015	Club Friday Season 5: Secret of Classroom 6/3	Praewpailin (Mook)	GMM25	Support	
2015	Hormones Season 3	Wiriya Korkietpirom (Koi)	ONE31	Main	
2016	I See You	Chaba	GMM25	Support	
2016	Love Songs Love Series: Destiny	Eve	GMM25	Main	
2017	Project S The Series: Side by Side	Noi	GMM25	Main	
2018	House of Venom	Yard	ONE31	Main	
2018	Social Syndrome	Jam	LINE TV	Main	
2019	Club Friday Season 11: Love Without Formula	Nonlinee (Non)	GMM25	Main	
2020	Club Sapan Fine	Munoi	GMM25	Main: Episode 2	
2020	Quarantine Stories	Toey	GMM25	Main: Episode 2	
2021	Money Honey	Honey	Thai PBS	Main	
2021	Debt Therapy	Pun	Thai PBS	Main	
2021	Remember You	Aiyada (Aye)	TrueID	Main	
2022	Catch Me Baby	Pinky	WeTV	Support	
2024	Start-Up	Phafan (Dream)	TrueID	Main	
2024	Ready, Set, Love	Darika Chokwithee (Day)	Netflix	Main	
2025	ClaireBell	Kae	ONE31	Support	

=== Music videos ===
Year	Title	Song Artist	Note	Ref.
2014	Arb-Nam-Ron (อาบน้ำร้อน)	Big Ass	Soundtrack from Hormones: The Series.	
2014	Nak-Leng-Keyboard (นักเลงคีย์บอร์ด)	Stamp Apiwat Eurthavornsuk	Album: Sci-Fi, played as "Pim" Pimchanok Taweechoke.	
2015	Ra-Wang-Rao-Song-Khon (ระหว่างเราสองคน)	Ae Jirakorn Sompitak	Soundtrack from Ab Ruk Online.	
2015	Ru-Lae-Khao-Jai (รู้และเข้าใจ)	Crescendo	Sequel of Ra-Wang-Rao-Song-Khon.	
2015	Yon (ย้อน)	Slot Machine	Soundtrack from Hormones: The Series. (Season 3)	
2015	Jing-Jung-Sak-Krang (จริงจังสักครั้ง)	Muanpair Panaboot		
2017	Lok-Tee-Mai-Mee-Ter (โลกที่ไม่มีเธอ)	PORTRAIT		
2016	Kon-Mee-Sa-Neh (คนมีเสน่ห์)	Pang Nakarin Kingsak	Sequel of Kon-Mee-Sa-Neh.	
2016	Kon-Mee-Sa-Neh Part 2 (คนมีเสน่ห์ ภาค 2)	Pang Nakarin Kingsak	Sequel of Kon-Mee-Sa-Neh.	

=== Web shows ===
Year	Title	Channel
2012	Play Gang Len-sa-nook Sook-yok-koun	GTH On Air
2013	Play Gang Boys Meet Girls	GTH On Air
2014	GANG 'MENT Boys Meet Girls	GTH On Air
2014	24.7 Lung-Luek-Tuek-Grammy	GTH On Air

=== Host ===
Year	Title	Channel	Ref.
2017	Game of Teens	GMM25	
2021	HangOver Thailand: Chiang Dao	Nadao Bangkok	
2021	CCND	Nadao Bangkok	

== Awards and nominations ==
Year	Award	Category	Work	Results	Notes
2015	Daradaily The Great Awards #5	Rising Female Star of the Year	Hormones: The Series	Won	
2016	Kazz Awards	Kazz Magazine's Favorite Female Award	Hormones: The Series	Won	Shared with Sananthachat Thanapatpisal
2018	9th Nataraja Awards	Best Ensemble Cast	Project S The Series: Side by Side	Won	
2019	Global OTT Awards	Best Newcomer Actress	Hormones: The Series	Won	Shared with Sananthachat Thanapatpisal
2026	Y Entertainment Awards	Y Star on Spotlight of the Year	ClaireBell	Nominated	
