= Ride or Die =

Ride or Die may refer to:

== Music ==
- Ride or Die (album), a 2016 album by Devon Allman
- Ride or Die (The Knocks song), 2018, featuring Foster the People
- Ride or Die (Evan song), 2026
- Ride or Die, a 2014 album by HeartsRevolution
- Ride or Die, a 2024 EP by Evnne
- "Ride or Die", the original title of the 2008 "Ride" single by Ace Hood
- "Ride or Die", a song by Arcade Fire from the 2025 album Pink Elephant
- "Ride or Die", a song by Ashley Roberts from the 2014 album Butterfly Effect
- "Ride or Die", a song by Hippo Campus from the 2022 album LP3
- "Ride or Die", a song by Jay-Z from the 1997 album Vol. 2... Hard Knock Life
- "Ride or Die", a song by Jeff Satur from the 2025 EP Red Giant
- "Ryde or Die", a song by Jennifer Lopez from the 2005 album Rebirth
- "Ride or Die", a song by Megan Thee Stallion from the 2019 soundtrack Queen & Slim
- "Ride or Die", a song by Metro Station from the 2015 album Savior

== Film and television ==
- Ride or Die (2003 film), a crime drama film
- Ride or Die (2021 film), a 2021 Japanese film
- Ride or Die (2026 TV series), TV series produced by Skydance Entertainment
- "Ride or Die" (FBI: Most Wanted), a 2020 television episode
- "Ride or Die" (Shameless), a 2016 television episode

== See also ==
- "Ryde or Die, Bitch", a 1999 song by The Lox
- The Challenge: Ride or Dies the 38th installment of reality TV series The Challenge
- Ride-or-die chick
