= ClaireBell =

2025 Thai television series

- Official series poster
- Thai: คลั่ง/รัก/นักโทษ
- Genre: Girls' love; Romantic drama
- Created by: Davika Hoorne; Chantavit Dhanasevi
- Screenplay by: Davika Hoorne; Chantavit Dhanasevi; Kanokphan Ornrattanasakul; Issaraporn Kuntisuk; Irene Insot; Natthakit Fungcharoen
- Directed by: Prach Rojanasinwilai
- Starring: Siriwalee Siriwibool; Paphavarin Sawasdiwech
- Country of origin: Thailand
- Original language: Thai
- No. of episodes: 8

Production
- Executive producer: Paris Intarakomalyasut
- Producer: Adam Muqri Konglapumnuay
- Cinematography: Bhurin Treetampinich
- Editor: Weerapat Tembundit
- Running time: 51–76 minutes
- Production company: Mine Media Production
- Budget: ฿30–40 million

Original release
- Network: One 31
- Release: 1 November – 20 December 2025

ClaireBell (Thai: คลั่ง/รัก/นักโทษ; RTGS: Khlang Rak Nakthot, lit. 'Crazy/Love/Prisoner') is a 2025 Thai girls' love original television series created by Davika Hoorne and Chanthavit Dhanasevi, under Mine Media Production and Maxmotive Production. Directed by Prach Rojanasinwilai (Jeen), it stars Siriwalee Siriwibool (Mable) and Paphavarin Sawasdiwech (Pangjie) as the titular characters Claire and Bell.

The series premiered on One 31 on 1 November 2025 and concluded on 20 December 2025. It was also made available for streaming on YouTube and OneD app (Uncut version).

== Synopsis ==
Bell is sentenced to two years in prison after being wrongfully convicted for drug possession. While serving her sentence, she is targeted by a violent group of inmates for a minor mistake. To survive the ordeal, she turns to the mysterious '19 Stab' Claire for help, an inmate convicted of murder who holds a relentless, 'rabid dog' reputation. Their relationship grows deeper as they spend more time together, providing them solace as Bell fights to regain her freedom, and secrets from Claire's past returns to haunt her.

== Cast and characters ==
=== Main ===
- Siriwalee Siriwibool (Mable) as Koraphat Kultharaksa (Claire), a mysterious, violent inmate who was convicted of brutally murdering a physics teacher years ago.
- Paphavarin Sawasdiwech (Pangjie) as Lalita Pianmas (Bell), a new inmate convicted of drug possession.

=== Supporting ===
- Angie Pantira Ouhirun (Angie) as Dusadee Srisukra (DeeDee), part of the violent '3D' gang and younger sister to Dao and Duen.
- Jirakit Kanjanawaraporn (Barbell) as Porsche Phirat, a new prison guard and Wichai's son.
- Kemisara Paladesh (Belle) as Kae, Bell's cellmate.
- Natcha Wongprasert (Attar) as Natty/Cream, Claire's younger sister.
- Farida Sa-ard (Eye) as Duen, Dao and DeeDee's sister.
- Ponlawit Ketprapakorn (Pond) as Top, Bell's boyfriend.
- Jidapa Phonrojpanya (Tontoei) as Mangpor, an inmate who sources goods from outside the prison.
- Siraphan Wattanajinda (Noon) as Dao, the head inmate and older sister to Duen and DeeDee.
- Witaya Wasukraipaisarn (Aun) as Wichai, the prison warden.
- Usha Seamkhum (Taew) as Pa'Pon, an elderly inmate and Claire's cellmate.
- Watcharawit Sornsuriyawong (Santa) as Joe, Natty's friend.
- Pattarasuda Anuman Rajadhon (Bua) as a new prison officer.

=== Guest ===
- Paris Intarakomalyasut as himself
- Davika Hoorne as Mint, Maed's sister.
- Chantavit Dhanasevi as Jade, Bell's lawyer.
- Elisha Triwiwatkul (Hymn) as Maed, a physics teacher.
- Kittipol Kesmanee (Pu) as Sutthi Sangkhabut, a politician and Top's father.
- Charlotte Austin as an unnamed prisoner.

== Soundtrack ==
ClaireBell Soundtrack
No.	Title	Writer(s)	Artist	Length
1.	"Starlight"	Amp Achariya Dulyapaiboon	Violette Wautier	3:25

== Episodes ==
No.	Title	Original release date
1	"Freshman Orientation Day"	1 November 2025
Bell is wrongfully convicted of drug possession during her graduation party at a club, leaving her sick father behind. Her cellmate Kae introduces her to the prison's hierarchy, including the influential 3D gang, the prison economic system, and the infamous 'Rabid Dog' inmate whom everyone stays away from. Bell begins working at the library, and meets 'Rabid Dog' by chance. She later learns that the inmate's name is '19 Stab' Claire, a young woman convicted of brutally murdering her physics teacher years ago. A new prison officer misuses her power, and is almost strangled to death by Claire. Bell becomes a target of harassment by DeeDee, one of the 3D gang members, due to a small mistake. While being chased by the gang at the canteen, Bell is saved by Claire, who then invites her to share a meal together. Later, DeeDee and her sister Duen, with the help of the new prison officer, enters Bell's cell to take revenge, while the prison officer enters Claire's cell to 'teach her a lesson'.
2	"Visiting Day"	8 November 2025
Claire subdues the new prison officer and saves Belle in time. Wichai, the prison warden, reluctantly brings in his son, Porche, as the new prison officer. Dao's teenage son visits her for the first time. Bell attempts to apologise to DeeDee, but unintentionally makes things worse for herself. DeeDee and her gang attempts to make a jump on Bell, who hides in the prison's abandoned toilet. There, she meets Claire and they share a conversation. Later, Mint visits Claire to push for an explanation on why the latter murdered her brother. Elsewhere, Bell's boyfriend Top, who convinced her to reduce her sentence by pleading guilty, begs his father to get Bell out of prison. His father berates him and refuses his request. To Bell's devastation, Top lies about his involvement with Bell on national TV. When DeeDee and Duen attempt to take revenge on Bell again, they accidentally injure Pa'Pon, Claire's elderly cellmate.
3	"Family"	15 November 2025
DeeDee and Duen narrowly avoid Claire's wrath. Pa'Pon received minor injuries, and Porch discovers that the elderly woman has Alzheimer's. Claire threatens DeeDee in the bathroom for harming Pa'Pon. Bell finds out that her father's nurse has ceased her services under Top's instructions. DeeDee's hazing on Bell continues. Pa'Pon's Alzheimer's symptoms worsen, but shares a tender moment with Claire after she suddenly remembers the reason behind her manslaughter charge. Kae proposes a money lending scheme to DeeDee and Duen in return for them to stop harassing Bell. In the abandoned toilet, Claire and Bell have a heartfelt conversation and give in to their feelings for each other. Later, Top visits Bell and informs her that her father has passed away. Claire discovers Pa'Pon's lifeless body in their cell.
4	"Lost and Found"	22 November 2025
Pa'Pon dies from an accidental overdose, and Claire blames Wichai's negligence for the tragedy. Bell pays a bribe to attend her father's funeral thanks to Kae's loan. When Bell witnesses DeeDee's gang beating up an inmate for failing to pay back their debt, she confronts Kae for being complicit in the violence. An upset Kae confesses her feelings to Bell, and is immediately rejected. Released from solitary confinement, Claire mourns Pa'Pon, and meets Bell at the abandoned toilet. They comfort each other in their respective grief, and Claire reveals that she took the fall for her younger sister Natty, who committed the actual murder. They make love for the first time. Unbeknownst to them, Kae witnesses the entire scene. Mint bumps into Natty while attempting to visit Claire.
5	"Honeymoon Phase"	29 November 2025
Claire and Bell bring their relationship into the open. Dao confronts DeeDee and Duen about running their money lending business behind her back, and Kae gains more power with Dao out of the picture. Porsche reports his father's negligence on Pa'Pon's case to the prison director. Claire breaks Bell out of her cell and teaches her how to short circuit the prison's electrical system. They roam about the grounds before Claire proposes to Bell with a vine ring, and they have an imaginary wedding in the greenhouse. Elsewhere, Natty breaks down in front of her parents from the weight of what happened to Claire. Later, rumours circulate that Natty is the real '19 stab' killer. It is revealed that Kae overheard Claire's confession and had instructed her friend to spread the rumour. Mint provokes Claire with the new information during her visit.
6	"Rabid Dog"	6 December 2025
In a flashback, Claire drops out of school to sell secondhand goods. Natty convinces her physics teacher Maed to tutor her so she could join the Science Olympiad. During a study session, Maed sexually assaults Natty, who stabs him with a pair of scissors in defence. Claire rushes to the computer lab when she receives Natty's call, and finds her sister covered in blood next to Maed's lifeless body. She makes Natty promise to keep the incident a secret, and sends her home before smearing her face and body with Maed's blood. In the present, Claire accuses Bell of revealing her secret. She lands herself in solitary confinement for a month after punching Wichai for rejecting her job request. Bell borrows money from Kae to grow roses in the greenhouse. As Claire begins to lose her mind, Bell sends her a tray of bread and a sketchbook reminiscing their time together. Later, Bell is attacked by DeeDee's gang under Kae's instructions for not paying back her loan in time. Kae cements her power by pushing DeeDee and Duen out of the business. Claire blackmails Wichai and has Bell transferred to her cell. Mint accidentally obtains Maed's phone after a failed attempt to gain information from Natty.
7	"Roses"	13 December 2025
Top pressures Beam to confess to putting the drugs in Bell's handbag at the club. DeeDee and Duen reconciles with Dao. Claire and Bell take up jobs under Dao's supervision to pay off Bell's debt. Dao finds out she's pregnant and confronts Kae for swapping out her birth control pills. Wichai pressures her to get an abortion. Beam visits Bell to tell her that he'll confess, and reveals that the drugs belonged to Top. After getting thrown into solitary confinement for attempting to shiv Kae, DeeDee and Porsche grow closer. Claire and Bell spend a night outdoors to celebrate her impending freedom. Natty reveals the truth to her parents.
8	"Freedom is Not a Coincidence"	20 December 2025
Dao decides to keep the baby. Kae's friend stops paying her her cut of the scheme that landed her in prison. Unable to pay their cut, her underlings leave her to collect her debts alone. Mint discovers lewd pictures of his students on her brother's phone, along with the video of his sexual assault on Natty. She meets Natty to pass her back the phone, who hands it in to authorities as evidence of self-defense, thus clearing Claire of all charges. On the day of Bell's release, Kae tampers with the canteen food, triggering a severe allergic reaction from Bell. Claire brutally attacks Kae, and is sentenced to three years in prison for attempted murder. Porsche resigns from his position, and Wichai is subsequently fired for inappropriate relations with an inmate. Bell visits Claire in prison, and promises to wait for her, but is rejected by Claire. Bell confronts Top at his home about the drugs. While he's intoxicated in the garden, Bell short circuits the electrical system and burns down the house, prompting a search from the police during the fire rescue, who finds large amounts of drugs in Top's study room. Three years later, Duen is in charge of the kitchen, DeeDee is more in control of her temperaments, and Kae shares a cell with an aggressive inmate. Dao's infant son visits her as Claire is leaving. Claire's family greets her at the prison entrance. As they are leaving, Bell calls out to Claire from a distance, and they happily embrace.

== Marketing ==
A teaser was released on 18 January 2025, followed by a pilot on 16 February 2025 on Mine Media Production's YouTube channel. The trailer was released on 17 October 2025.

A series of brand sponsored clips were uploaded before and after the premiere, featuring short skits of the cast. An 8-part documentary was released after each episode, featuring behind the scenes of the production process. Additionally, another series of brand sponsored clips were uploaded after the series ended, showing life after the series for the titular characters.

The completed script was adapted into the novel ClaireBell by Ka9esama, published on 1 January 2024, with the English version translated by Sweet Bar published on 8 June 2025.

== Awards and nominations ==
Award nominations for ClaireBell
Year	Award	Category	Nominee(s)	Result	Ref.
2026	17th Nataraja Awards	Best Editing	ClaireBell	Nominated	
2026	17th Nataraja Awards	Best Supporting Actress	Siraphan Wattanajinda	Nominated	
2026	17th Nataraja Awards	Best OST	"Starlight" by Violette Wautier	Nominated	
2026	22nd Kom Chad Luek Awards	Most Popular Drama – Series	ClaireBell	Nominated	
2026	22nd Kom Chad Luek Awards	Popular Actress	Paphavarin Sawasdiwech	Nominated	
2026	22nd Kom Chad Luek Awards	Popular Actress	Siriwalee Siriwibool	Nominated	
2026	22nd Kom Chad Luek Awards	Popular Girls' Love Couples	Siriwalee Siriwibool & Paphavarin Sawasdiwech	Nominated	
2026	Y Entertain Awards 2026	Best Creative Team of the Year	ClaireBell	Won	
2026	Y Entertain Awards 2026	Best GL Series of the Year	ClaireBell	Won	
2026	Y Entertain Awards 2026	Best Y Series Director of the Year	Prach Rojanasinwilai	Nominated	
2026	Y Entertain Awards 2026	Leading Girls' Love Star of the Year	Siriwalee Siriwibool	Nominated	
2026	Y Entertain Awards 2026	Y Star on Spotlight of the Year	Kemisara Paladesh	Nominated	
2026	Feed x Khaosod Awards 2026	Boys' Love–Girls' Love Director of the Year	Prach Rojanasinwilai	Nominated	
2026	Feed x Khaosod Awards 2026	Girls' Love Actress of the Year	Siriwalee Siriwibool	Nominated	
2026	Feed x Khaosod Awards 2026	Top-Tier GL Series of the Year	ClaireBell	Won	
2026	Feed x Khaosod Awards 2026	Most Popular Actress (Popular Vote)	Siriwalee Siriwibool	Nominated	
2026	Howe Awards 2026	Outstanding Production of the Year	ClaireBell	Won	
