= Project S =

Project S may refer to:

- Project S, an alternative title for the movie Once a Cop
- Project S: The Series, a 2017 Thai television series
- Project [S], or Project Soundpage, an unofficial fan project devoted to recreate Homestuck into an animated format
