= Gelboys =

2025 Thai television series

- Thai: สถานะกั๊กใจ
- Genre: Romantic drama; Comedy; Boys' love
- Written by: Naruebet Kuno; Pattaranad Phiboonsawat; Naron Cherdsoongnern; Es Prinwat
- Directed by: Naruebet Kuno; Naron Cherdsoongnern; Es Prinwat (season 2)
- Starring: Chayapak Tunprayoon; Monthapoom Sumonvarangkul; Mahidol Pibulsonggram; Leon Zech
- Opening theme: "No-status Status" by BUS; "I Stan You" (ปักเมนแฟน) by PP Krit, Nex (BUS), Onglee (Proxie)
- Country of origin: Thailand
- Original language: Thai
- No. of seasons: 2
- No. of episodes: 15

Production
- Running time: 55–83 minutes
- Production company: Looke

Original release
- Network: One31; iQIYI
- Release: 8 February 2025 – 26 September 2026

Gelboys (Thai: สถานะกั๊กใจ; RTGS: Sathana Kak Chai) is a 2025 Thai boys' love romantic drama television series, starring Chayapak Tunprayoon (New), Monthapoom Sumonvarangkul (Pide), Mahidol Pibulsonggram (PJ) and Leon Zech, directed by Naruebet Kuno (Boss).

The series was produced by Looke in partnership with iQIYI and premiered on 8 February 2025, airing on One 31 and streaming internationally via iQIYI.

A second season titled Gelboys 2: Stuck in the Fan Zone (Thai: ตกอยู่ในสถานะติ่งแฟน; RTGS: Tok Yu Nai Sathana Ting Faen), directed by Es Prinwat, premiered on One 31 on 8 August 2026.

== Synopsis ==
Fou4Mod (Chayapak Tunprayoon), a high school student, begins hanging out around Siam Square after being invited by Chian (Monthapoom Sumonvarangkul), who enjoys doing gel nails. The flirty atmosphere sparks feelings in Fou4Mod, but he soon discovers that Chian also invites a TikTok influencer named Bua (Leon Zech) to the same meetups. Feeling left out, Fou4Mod decides to make Chian jealous by getting closer to his best friend, Baabin (Mahidol Pibulsonggram).

== Cast ==
=== Main ===
- Chayapak Tunprayoon (New) as Fou4Mod [seasons 1–2]
- Monthapoom Sumonvarangkul (Pide) as Chian [seasons 1–2]
- Mahidol Pibulsonggram (PJ) as Baabin [seasons 1–2]
- Leon Zech as Bua [seasons 1–2]
- Veeravit Sodsrisuwan (Peem) as Gelz [season 2]
- Nattapat Permpongpanth (Mye) as Baby [season 2]

=== Supporting ===
- Peerada Namwong (Paper) as Faifa (100% Battery gang) [seasons 1–2]
- Jirapat Pakkawin (Focus) as Chuan (100% Battery gang)
- Phordee Satitpunwaycha (Dee) as Pao (100% Battery gang) [seasons 1–2]
- Chintub Duangkaew (Fay) as Mai (100% Battery gang)
- Nutthawut Eamchuen (Bonus) as Moo
- Thananya Thitiworachot (Cream) as FayeFangKaew (Fou4Mod's sister)

=== Guest ===
- Palita Kitiyodom as Chanom (Ep. 1)
- Pariya Terasakulsit (Pin) as Fou4Mod's mother (Ep. 1–3)
- Suriyawit Thanomchaisanit (Yochi) as Men (Ep. 2–4)
- Thananat Dorongsawasd as Fou4Mod's father (Ep. 2–3)
- Nutharphob Phobaikoon as Baabin's father (Ep. 4)
- Natpaphat Klungsuwan (Yipun) as Baabin's mother (Ep. 4)
- Ninew Phetdankaeo as Street interviewer (Ep. 5)
- Sarin Suraprasert (Jaosua) as Chian's roommate (Ep. 6)
- Ratchanon Ruenpech (Gun) as himself (Ep. 7)
- Pannathorn Jirasart (Kim) as himself (Ep. 7)
- Pavaris Srichaichana (Chokun) as himself (Ep. 7)
- Gorn Wannapairote as himself (Ep. 7)
- Oscar Edward Wattraserte (Onglee) as himself (Ep. 7)
- Vorameth Kornubrabhan (Victor) as himself (Ep. 7)
- Patipol Teekayuwat (Es Prinwat) as Faifa's new boyfriend (Ep. 7)
- Jednipat Tassanaananchai as Sing
- Thongchai Wangsiripaisarn (Wu) as Phat
- Taas Tanyongmas as Korn

== Series overview ==
Season	Episodes	Originally released	
Season	Episodes	First released	Last released
1	7	8 February 2025	22 March 2025
2	8	8 August 2026	26 September 2026

== Original soundtrack ==
No.	Title	Writer(s)	Artist	Length
1.	"No-status Status" (กั๊ก)	Noth Getsunova; Prateep Siri-issranan	BUS	3:09
2.	"Red Flag" (เลิกกั๊กแล้วรักก่อน)	Afu Narongsak Sribandasakwatcharakorn; Thanee Wongniwatkajorn (Gop Postcard)	New Chayapak	2:18
3.	"Red Flag" (Fou4Mod Version)	Afu Narongsak Sribandasakwatcharakorn; Thanee Wongniwatkajorn (Gop Postcard)	New Chayapak	3:06
4.	"9PM" (วันนี้ปีหน้า)	Amp Achariya Dulyapaiboon	Pide	3:44
5.	"Gu Ja Crazy" (ไอ้บ้า)	Tan Liptapallop; Panithi Lertudomthana	PJ	3:32
6.	"Noid-Ah" (ไม่เท่าเดิม)	Tunwa Ketsuwan (HYE)	Leon Brocco	3:16
7.	"Lovegels"	UrboyTJ; Prateep Siri-issranan; Thanee Wongniwatkajorn (Gop Postcard); Diary Peerakaz	New Chayapak; Pide; PJ; Leon Brocco	2:47

== Awards and nominations ==
Award ceremony, year, category, nominee/work and result
Award	Year	Category	Nominee/work	Result	Ref.
Mint Awards	2025	Breakthrough Cast of the Year	Gelboys	Won	
Y Universe Awards	2025	The Best BL Series	Gelboys	Nominated	
Y Universe Awards	2025	The Best Series	Gelboys	Nominated	
Y Universe Awards	2025	The Best Art Direction	Gelboys	Won	
Y Universe Awards	2025	The Best Costume Design	Gelboys	Nominated	
Y Universe Awards	2025	The Best Production	Gelboys	Nominated	
Y Universe Awards	2025	The Best Series Script	Gelboys	Won	
Y Universe Awards	2025	The Best Social Commentary Series	Gelboys	Nominated	
Y Universe Awards	2025	The Best Special Effects	Gelboys	Nominated	
Y Universe Awards	2025	The Best Series Director	Naruebet Kuno	Won	
Y Universe Awards	2025	The Best Original Song for a Series	"เลิกกั๊กแล้วรักก่อน (Red Flag)"	Won	
Y Universe Awards	2025	The Best Series OST	"เลิกกั๊กแล้วรักก่อน (Red Flag)"	Nominated	
Nataraja Awards	2026	Best Drama	Gelboys	Nominated	
Nataraja Awards	2026	Best Director	Naruebet Kuno	Nominated	
Nataraja Awards	2026	Best OST	"เลิกกั๊กแล้วรักก่อน (Red Flag)"	Won	
Nataraja Awards	2026	Best Costume	Gelboys	Nominated	
Nataraja Awards	2026	Best Editing	Gelboys	Nominated	
Nataraja Awards	2026	Best Art Direction	Gelboys	Nominated	

=== Listicles ===
Year-end lists for Gelboys
Critic/Publication	List	Rank	Ref.
Teen Vogue	13 Best BL Dramas of 2025	Included	
Queerty	10 Best BL Dramas of 2025	Included	
Teen Vogue	27 Best BL Dramas of All Time	Included	
