= Jeff Satur =

Thai musician and actor (born 1995)

- เจฟ ซาเตอร์
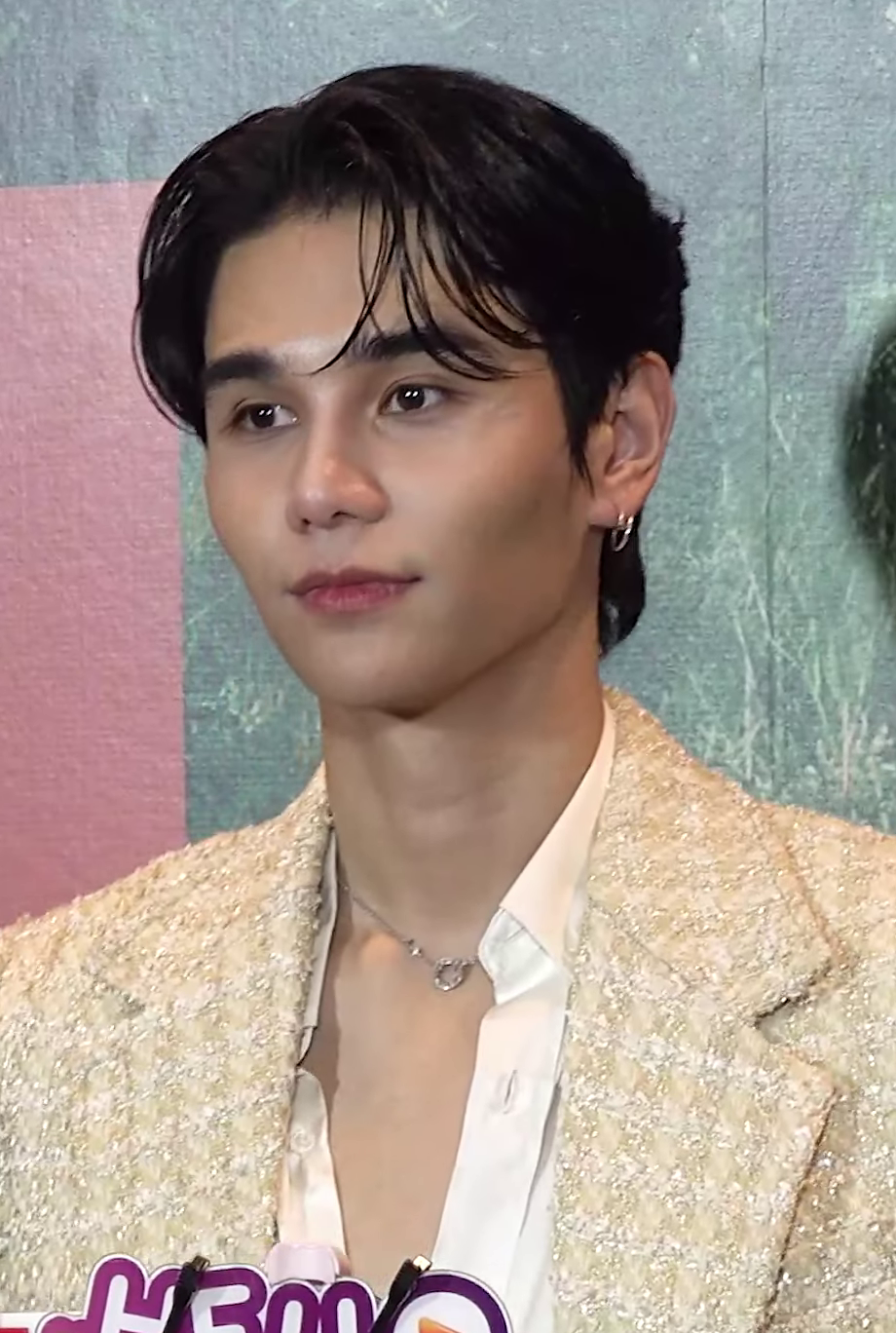
- Satur in July 2024
- Born: Worakamol Satur; 6 March 1995 (age 31); Bangkok, Thailand
- Education: Rangsit University
- Occupations: Singer; songwriter; music producer; actor
- Years active: 2015–present
- Agent: Studio On Saturn
- Works: Discography
- Awards: full list
- Musical career
- Genre: T-pop
- Instruments: Vocals
- Years active: 2013–present
- Labels: Wayfer Records; Universal Music Southeast Asia

Worakamol Satur (Thai: วรกมล ซาเตอร์, born 6 March 1995), better known as Jeff Satur (เจฟ ซาเตอร์), is a Thai singer and actor.

== Early life and education ==
Born and raised in Bangkok, he has Thai-Italian-Indian ancestry from his father's side, while his mother is of Thai-Chinese descent. He's the second child of seven, with an older brother, a younger brother with whom he shares the same mother, and two younger sisters. Details about his two youngest siblings are unknown, as they have been kept out of the public eye to date.

Satur started liking music around 9-10 years old, mostly listening to metal music. He was inspired to take on music by AC/DC and X Japan, and learned to play the acoustic guitar, drums, bass and keyboard. In middle school he formed a band with his friends, taking on the role of singer, and started playing music seriously in grade 11-12. He learned the electric guitar and piano before taking formal singing lessons.

He graduated from the Satit Bilingual School of Rangsit University in Arts and Japanese language and has a bachelor's degree in Business Administration.

== Career ==
After entering the music industry through a TV contest, Satur auditioned at Kamikaze under RS Group, spending more than two years training until he debuted his first song, "Broken World", in 2013. When Kamikaze decided to close down, he was moved to The Demo label instead, releasing the songs "Miss You Like Crazy" and "Afraid to Say", which received positive feedback. In 2015, he signed with Garden Music until the contract expired; Satur then moved to Grand Music in 2018. He used several stage names through the years, like Jeff The Demo, Jeff Demo Project and Jeff Garden Studio.

In 2019, he decided to quit music and work at his father's business, but he met a manager called Pop, who gave him the opportunity to act in the short film He She It and compose a song. "Comedy" was Satur's first ever self-composed song. In 2020 he signed with Passenger Records, then with Wayfer Records under Warner Music Thailand, releasing the singles "Highway", "Complicated" and "Loop". At the same time, he reprised writing his own music.

Satur became known to the general public in 2022 after playing Kim, the youngest son of a mafia family, in the BL drama series KinnPorsche, for which he wrote and sang "Why Don't You Stay". This acclaimed song propelled international fame of Satur and T-pop. During the series world tour, he announced that Be On Cloud would no longer manage him as an actor, while his music contract with Wayfer Records would still be valid. In 2023 he subsequently founded Studio On Saturn. That same year, he held his first solo concert, and released "Dum Dum", "Lucid" and the English-language single "Black Tie". He also ranked first in the Chinese reality show Call Me by Fire Season 3, winning two awards: Hot Song Performance of the Year and Singing Family.

At the beginning of 2024 he served as mentor for Chuang Asia: Thailand and released his first studio album Space Shuttle No.8, followed by an Asia tour in Taipei, Hong Kong, Manila, Jakarta, Singapore and Bangkok. In August 2024, Satur starred in the movie The Paradise of Thorns and sang the soundtrack "Rain Wedding".

On May 3–4, 2025, he performed at Impact Arena, Muang Thong Thani as the first stop of the Red Giant Concert, which continued in Asia and Latin America from June to August. The tickets for São Paulo and Mexico City were quickly sold out. Following the Red Giant tour, in November Satur released the extended play of the same name, Red Giant.

He was the first-ever Thai artist to speak and perform at the Grammy Museum in Los Angeles for a Global Spin Live event on 3 March 2026. The 200-person event at Clive Davis Theater sold out in 2 minutes.

In 2025, he was cast in crime-culinary TV series My Chef in Crime, opposite Nuttanicha Dungwattanawanich. In October 2026, it was announced that Satur had left Wayfer Records and signed with Universal Music Southeast Asia.

He is also set to star in the TV series Vamp and Happy Ending. For the latter, he will serve as producer, script writer, and composer, too.

== Endorsements ==
In June 2024, Satur was named Thailand's ambassador for French luxury jewelry house Cartier along with Kimberley Anne Woltemas and Thanapob Leeratanakachorn. In September 2024, Italian-based American luxury sunglasses and eyeglasses brand Ray-Ban announced Satur to become its first ambassador for Thailand. On 19 December, Italian luxury fashion house Valentino appointed him as its first brand ambassador from Thailand.

== Artistry ==
Satur has named Toshi, Adam Lambert, Freddie Mercury, Brian McKnight, Mariah Carey, Beyoncé, and Michael Jackson as some of his musical idols, expressing his fascination both for the high-pitched vocals of X Japan's Toshi and the artistry of Yoshiki, as well as the powerful mid-range sounds of underground music and Slipknot. He has attributed his singing style, which "incorporate[s] both the powerful high-pitched sounds of rock, and the soft, delicate tone of R&B," to the wide variety of music he had been listening to when he was young.

== Filmography ==
=== Movies ===
| Year | Title | Role | Notes | Ref. |
|---|---|---|---|---|
| 2019 | He She It | Mike | Short film | |
| 2024 | The Paradise of Thorns | Thongkham | | |

=== Television series ===
| Year | Title | Role | Notes | Ref. |
|---|---|---|---|---|
| 2020 | Ingredients | Marwin | | |
| 2021 | Love Area Part 1 | Sean | Supporting role | |
| 2022 | Love Area Part 2 | Sean | Guest role | |
| 2022 | KinnPorsche | "Kim" Kimhant Theerapanyakul | Supporting role | |
| 2026 | Wooju Bakery | Ra-on | Main role | |
| 2026 | My Chef in Crime | Charn Kun | Main role | |
| TBA | Happy Ending | Damon Cillian | Main role | |
| TBA | Vamp | Sean | TBA | |

=== TV shows ===
| Year | Title | Role | Ref. |
|---|---|---|---|
| 2026 | Running Man Thailand | Cast member | |
| 2026 | The Voice Thailand | Coach | |

== Discography ==
- Space Shuttle No. 8 (2024)
