= Mahidol Pibulsonggram =

Thai actor and singer (born 2003)

- มหิดล พิบูลสงคราม
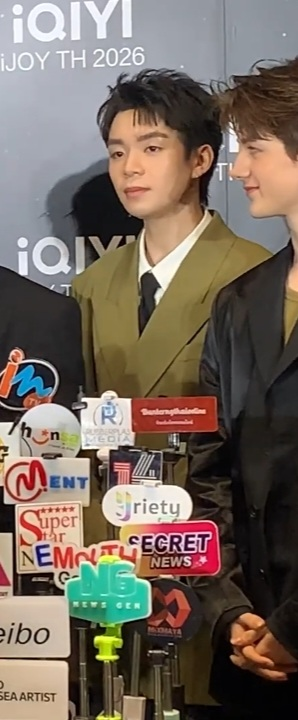
- Born: 15 December 2003 (age 22); Chiang Mai, Thailand
- Other name: PJ (พีเจ)
- Education: Chulalongkorn University
- Occupations: Actor; Singer
- Years active: 2022–present
- Agent: LOOKE World

Mahidol Pibulsonggram (Thai: มหิดล พิบูลสงคราม; born 15 December 2003), nicknamed PJ (Thai: พีเจ), is a Thai actor and singer. He is known for his roles in the television series Good Doctor (2024), GELBOYS (2025), and Happiness (2025). In 2026, he stars in Gelboys Season 2: Fandom Status on iQIYI.

== Early life and education ==
Mahidol Pibulsonggram was born in Chiang Mai, Thailand. He is the younger brother of actor and musician Krissanapoom Pibulsonggram (Jaylerr) and a descendant of former Thai prime minister Plaek Phibunsongkhram. He graduated from The Prince Royal's College in Chiang Mai and later enrolled in the Faculty of Communication Arts at Chulalongkorn University in Bangkok.

== Career ==
Mahidol made his acting debut in the television series Bad Guys in 2022. He later appeared in the series Good Doctor, Homeroom 29, and Happiness. In 2025, he appeared in the coming-of-age series GELBOYS as Baabin Saebal, one of the main characters.

The same year, he released his first solo single, Gu ja Crazy (ไอ้บ้า), which was used as an official soundtrack for GELBOYS. In 2025, he also participated in promotional activities and fan events related to GELBOYS, including the special event GELBOYS would like to watch the final episode with you and the GELBOYS Close Fan Meeting.

In April 2025, LOOKE announced Gelboys Season 2: Fandom Status, with Mahidol reprising his role as Baabin Saebal.

== Filmography ==
=== Television ===
Year	Title	Role	Notes	Network / Platform
2022	Bad Guys	—	Guest role	TrueID
2024	Good Doctor	Pluem	Main role	TrueID
2025	GELBOYS	Baabin Saebal	Main role	One 31 / iQIYI
2025	Homeroom 29	Tonkla	Supporting role	TrueID
2025	Happiness	Jee	Supporting role	TrueID
2026	Gelboys Season 2: Fandom Status	Baabin Saebal	Main role	iQIYI
2026	My Wife's Gunslinger God	Pete Phithan	Supporting role	TBA

=== Specials ===
Year	Title	Role
2025	Charging Gel	Baabin Saebal
2025	Charging Gel Special Episode	Baabin Saebal

== Discography ==
=== Singles ===
Year	Title	Notes
2025	Gu ja Crazy (ไอ้บ้า)	GELBOYS OST
2025	No-status Status (กั๊ก)	with BUS; GELBOYS OST

== Events ==
Year	Event	Venue	Country
2025	GELBOYS would like to watch the final episode with you	Lido Connect, Bangkok	Thailand
2025	GELBOYS Close Fan Meeting	Union Hall, Bangkok	Thailand
2025	TikTok Awards Thailand 2025	Bangkok	Thailand

== Awards and nominations ==
Year	Award	Category	Work	Result
2025	Mint Awards	Breakthrough Cast of the Year	GELBOYS (cast)	Won
