= Leon Zech =

Thai actor (born 2004)

- เลออน เซ็ค
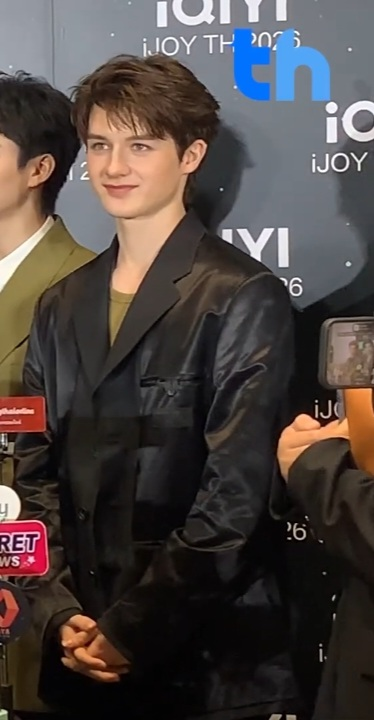
- Born: November 5, 2004 (age 21); Thailand
- Education: Chulalongkorn University
- Occupations: Actor; Model
- Years active: 2023–present

Leon Zech (Thai: เลออน เซ็ค; born 5 November 2004) is a Thai actor and model. He is known for portraying Bua in the coming-of-age series GELBOYS (2025), broadcast on One31, and its sequel Gelboys Season 2: Fandom Status (2026). He is also a member of the Thai boy group CIR*CRL. In 2026, he also joined the cast of Unknown Lover of DomundiTV, scheduled to air on iQIYI.

== Early life and career ==
Leon Zech was born on 5 November 2004. He is of Thai and German descent. Before beginning his acting career, he worked as a model and social media content creator.

In 2025, he made his acting debut in GELBOYS, a series produced by LOOKE and broadcast on One31 and iQIYI, portraying Bua, one of the show's main characters.

Later that year, he released his first solo single, "Noid-Ah" (ไม่เท่าเดิม), as part of the official soundtrack for GELBOYS.

Also in 2025, he joined the MCHOICE TRAINEE project, which later evolved into the boy group CIR*CRL.

In 2026, he reprised the role of Bua in Gelboys Season 2.

== Filmography ==
=== Television series ===
Year	Title	Role	Notes	Network / Platform	Ref.
2025	GELBOYS	Bua (Buachat Kamolprasit)	Main role	One31 iQIYI	
2026	Gelboys Season 2: Fandom Status	Bua (Buachat Kamolprasit)	Main role	One31 iQIYI	
TBA	Unknown Lover	TBA	Supporting role	One31 iQIYI	

=== Specials ===
Year	Title	Role	Notes	Platform
2025	Charging Gel	Bua	Main role	YouTube iQIYI
2025	Charging Gel Special Episode	Bua	Main role	YouTube iQIYI

=== Television shows ===
Year	Title	Role	Network / Platform
2026	3Fight3 Basket Boy Season 2	Special appearance	One31
2025	Gelty	Regular cast member	YouTube
2025	Secret Gel	Regular cast member	YouTube
2025	Gelboys Behind the Scenes	Regular cast member	YouTube
2025	Gelboys Documentary	Regular cast member	YouTube
2025	Thailand Music Countdown 2025	Guest appearance	MCOT HD 30
2025	TikTok Awards Thailand 2025	Musical performance	TikTok Live

== Discography ==
=== Singles ===
Year	Title	Album
2025	Noid-Ah (ไม่เท่าเดิม)	GELBOYS OST

== Events and fan meetings ==
Year	Date	Event	Venue	Notes
2025	23 March	GELBOYS would like to watch the final episode with you	Lido Connect, Bangkok	Special screening event for the season finale
2025	21 June	GELBOYS Close Fan Meeting	Union Hall, Bangkok	First official fan meeting of the main cast
2025	8 November	TikTok Awards Thailand 2025	Bangkok	Musical performance with the cast of GELBOYS

== Recognition ==
=== Awards and nominations ===
Year	Award	Category	Work	Result
2025	Mint Awards	Breakthrough Cast of the Year	GELBOYS (cast)	Won

=== Listicles ===
Editorial recognition
Publication	List	Rank	Ref.
Queerty	As the gay romance BL genre grows, these are the 11 hottest rising stars on the planet right now	Included	
