= List of awards and nominations received by Jeff Satur =

Jeff Satur awards and nominations
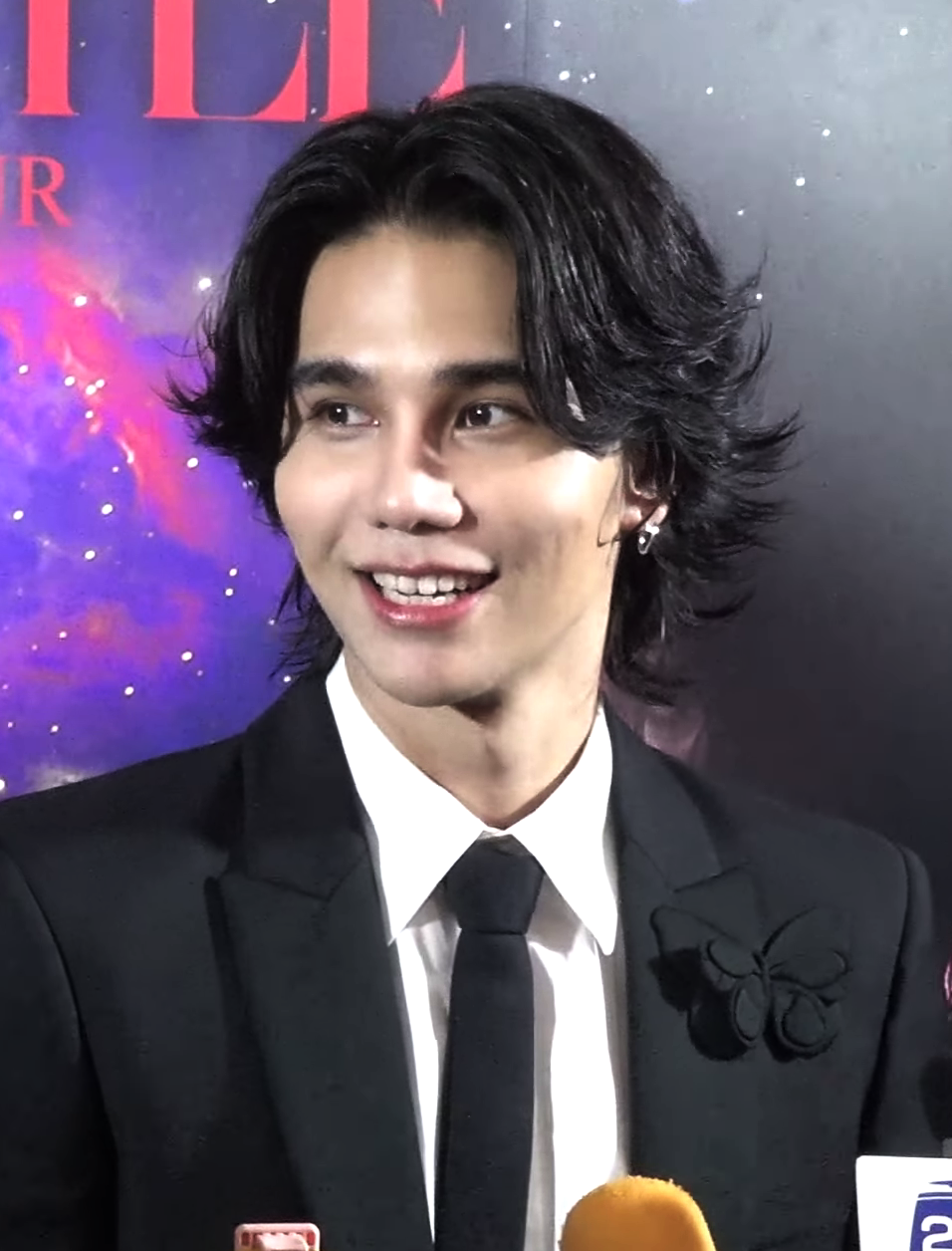
- Satur in November 2023
Awards and nominations
Award	Wins	Nominations
Asian Pop Music Awards	0	1
Berlin Music Video Awards	0	1
Dailynews Awards	0	1
Feed x Khaosod Awards	0	4
Feed Y Awards	0	1
GQ Thailand Men of the Year	1	1
Hashtag Legend 100 List Social Club	1	1
Howe Awards	0	1
Kazz Awards	3	5
Kom Chad Luek Awards	4	6
Line Melody Music Awards	1	1
Line Melody Music Chart	1	1
Maya Superstar Idol Awards	0	1
Maya TV Awards	0	4
Music Awards Japan	1	3
Nine Entertain Awards	3	4
Sanook Top of the Year Awards	0	3
Spotify Wrapped Live Thailand	3	3
Suphannahong National Film Awards	1	2
T-Pop of the Year Music Awards	6	12
Thailand Box Office Movie Awards	1	2
Thailand Social Awards	2	2
The Guitar Mag Awards	5	14
The People Awards	1	2
The Viral Hits Awards	0	2
Trust Gu Thai Film Awards	1	1
YUniverse Awards	1	1
Zoomdara Awards	0	1

Totals (Note: Certain award groups do not simply award one winner. They acknowledge several different recipients, have runners-up, and have third place. Since this is a specific recognition and is different from losing an award, runner-up mentions are considered wins in this award tally. For simplification and to avoid errors, each award in this list has been presumed to have had a prior nomination.)
- Wins: 37
- Nominations: 82

Thai singer and actor Jeff Satur has won many accolades and awards throughout his career. The artist has received a total of 37 awards out of 82 nominations.

Satur was named Thailand's ambassador for French luxury jewelry house Cartier along with Kimberley Anne Woltemas and Thanapob Leeratanakachorn. In September 2024, Italian-based American luxury sunglasses and eyeglasses brand Ray-Ban announced Satur to become its first ambassador for Thailand. On 19 December, Italian luxury fashion house Valentino appointed him as its first brand ambassador from Thailand.

Satur has named Toshi, Adam Lambert, Freddie Mercury, Brian McKnight, Mariah Carey, Beyoncé, and Michael Jackson as some of his musical idols, expressing his fascination both for the high-pitched vocals of X Japan, Toshi and Yoshiki, and the powerful mid-range sounds of underground music and Slipknot. He has attributed his singing style, which "incorporate[s] both the powerful high-pitched sounds of rock, and the soft, delicate tone of R&B," to the wide variety of music he had been listening to when he was young.

== Awards and nominations ==
Name of the award ceremony, year presented, category, nominee of the award, and the result of the nomination
Award	Year	Category	Nominee/work	Result	Ref.
Asian Pop Music Awards	2025	People's Choice Award	Jeff Satur	Nominated	
Berlin Music Video Awards	2024	Best Cinematography	"Black Tie"	Nominated	
Dailynews Awards	2024	Superstar Award	Jeff Satur	Nominated	
Feed x Khaosod Awards	2025	Top 10 Artist	Jeff Satur	Nominated	
Feed x Khaosod Awards	2025	Best Artist of the Year	Jeff Satur	Nominated	
Feed x Khaosod Awards	2025	Best Concert of the Year	Red Giant Concert	Nominated	
Feed x Khaosod Awards	2026	Popular Artist	Jeff Satur	Nominated	
Feed Y Awards	2024	Most Popular Thai Pop Song Award	"Ghost"	Nominated	
GQ Thailand Men of the Year	2024	Actor of the Year	Jeff Satur	Won	
Hashtag Legend 100 List Social Club	2026	Sound of a Generation Award	Jeff Satur	Won	
Howe Awards	2023	Best Singer Award	Jeff Satur	Nominated	
Howe Awards	2026	50 Influential People	Jeff Satur	Won	
Kazz Awards	2023	Popular Male Artist Award	Jeff Satur	Nominated	
Kazz Awards	2024	Popular Male Artist Award	Jeff Satur	Nominated	
Kazz Awards	2025	Superstar Award	Jeff Satur	Won	
Kazz Awards	2025	Hottest Song of the Year	"Ghost"	Won	
Kazz Awards	2026	People of the Year	Jeff Satur	Won	
Kom Chad Luek Awards	2023	Best Song	"Lucid"	Nominated	
Kom Chad Luek Awards	2023	Best Male Solo Artist	Jeff Satur	Nominated	
Kom Chad Luek Awards	2024	Best Male Solo Artist	Jeff Satur	Won	
Kom Chad Luek Awards	2025	Best Male Solo Artist	Jeff Satur	Won	
Kom Chad Luek Awards	2025	Best Leading Actor	Jeff Satur	Won	
Kom Chad Luek Awards	2025	Best Thai Pop Song	"Ghost"	Won	
Line Melody Music Awards	2024	Line Melody Most Searched 2024	Jeff Satur	Won	
Line Melody Music Chart	2024	Black Melody Award (September)	"Rain Wedding"	Won	
Maya Superstar Idol Awards	2026	Idol of the Year	Jeff Satur	Nominated	
Maya TV Awards	2024	T-Pop Artist of the Year	Jeff Satur	Nominated	
Maya TV Awards	2025	T-Pop Artist of the Year	Jeff Satur	Nominated	
Maya TV Awards	2025	Maya Popularity Award	Jeff Satur	Nominated	
Maya TV Awards	2026	Artist of the Year	Jeff Satur	Nominated	
Music Awards Japan	2025	Best Song Asia	"Ghost"	Nominated	
Music Awards Japan	2025	Best of Listeners' Choice: International Song	"Ghost"	Nominated	
Music Awards Japan	2025	Special Award: Thai Popular Music	"Ghost"	Won	
Nine Entertain Awards	2024	Solo Artist of the Year	Jeff Satur	Won	
Nine Entertain Awards	2024	Song of the Year	"Dum Dum"	Nominated	
Nine Entertain Awards	2025	Song of the Year	"Ghost"	Won	
Nine Entertain Awards	2026	Solo Artist of the Year	Jeff Satur	Won	
Sanook Top of the Year Awards	2024	Hit Song of the Year	"Dum Dum"	Nominated	
Sanook Top of the Year Awards	2024	Top Artist of the Year	Jeff Satur	Nominated	
Sanook Top of the Year Awards	2024	Best Actor of the Year	Jeff Satur	Nominated	
Spotify Wrapped Live Thailand	2024	Thailand Top Local Song of 2024	"Ghost"	Won	
Spotify Wrapped Live Thailand	2024	Thailand Top Song from T-Pop Now Playlist	"Ghost"	Won	
Spotify Wrapped Live Thailand	2024	Thailand Top Local Album of 2024	Space Shuttle No.8	Won	
Suphannahong National Film Awards	2025	Best Actor	Jeff Satur	Nominated	
Suphannahong National Film Awards	2025	Best Original Song	"Rain Wedding"	Won	
T-Pop of the Year Music Awards	2022	Best Music of the Year (Male Artist)	"Fade"	Nominated	
T-Pop of the Year Music Awards	2022	Best Music of the Year (OST)	"Why Don't You Stay" (แค่เธอ)	Nominated	
T-Pop of the Year Music Awards	2023	Best Music of the Year (Male Artist)	"Dum Dum"	Won	
T-Pop of the Year Music Awards	2024	Best Song of the Year	"Ghost"	Won	
T-Pop of the Year Music Awards	2024	Best Record of the Year	"Ghost"	Won	
T-Pop of the Year Music Awards	2024	Best Pop Artist of the Year	Jeff Satur	Won	
T-Pop of the Year Music Awards	2024	Best Producer of the Year	Jeff Satur	Won	
T-Pop of the Year Music Awards	2024	Best Solo Artist of the Year	Jeff Satur	Won	
T-Pop of the Year Music Awards	2024	Most Popular Music of the Year	"Ghost"	Nominated	
T-Pop of the Year Music Awards	2024	Most Popular Male Artist of the Year	Jeff Satur	Nominated	
T-Pop of the Year Music Awards	2024	Most Popular OST of the Year	"Rain Wedding"	Nominated	
T-Pop of the Year Music Awards	2024	Most Popular Collaboration of the Year	"Scar"	Nominated	
Thailand Box Office Movie Awards	2024	Actor of the Year	Jeff Satur	Nominated	
Thailand Box Office Movie Awards	2024	Original Soundtrack of the Year	"Rain Wedding"	Won	
Thailand Social Awards	2025	Best Creator Performance on Social Media – Solo Male Artist	Jeff Satur	Won	
Thailand Social Awards	2026	Best Entertainment Figures Performance on Social Media – Solo Male Artist	Jeff Satur	Won	
The Guitar Mag Awards	2024	Best Male Artist of the Year	Jeff Satur	Won	
The Guitar Mag Awards	2024	Popular Vote	Jeff Satur	Nominated	
The Guitar Mag Awards	2024	Best Producer of the Year	Jeff Satur	Nominated	
The Guitar Mag Awards	2025	Best Male Artist of the Year	Jeff Satur	Won	
The Guitar Mag Awards	2025	Best Producer of the Year	Jeff Satur	Won	
The Guitar Mag Awards	2025	Best Songwriter of the Year	Jeff Satur	Nominated	
The Guitar Mag Awards	2025	Best Collaboration Song of the Year	"Scar"	Nominated	
The Guitar Mag Awards	2025	Best Album of the Year	Space Shuttle No.8	Won	
The Guitar Mag Awards	2025	Single Hits of the Year	"Ghost"	Won	
The Guitar Mag Awards	2025	Popular Vote	Jeff Satur	Nominated	
The Guitar Mag Awards	2026	Best Male Artist	Jeff Satur	Nominated	
The Guitar Mag Awards	2026	Best International Song	"Ride or Die"	Nominated	
The Guitar Mag Awards	2026	Best Album	Red Giant	Nominated	
The Guitar Mag Awards	2026	Popular Vote	Jeff Satur	Nominated	
The People Awards	2026	Popular of the Year	Jeff Satur	Longlisted	
The People Awards	2026	People of the Year – Entertainment	Jeff Satur	Won	
The Viral Hits Awards	2024	Best Male Solo Artist of the Year	Jeff Satur	Nominated	
The Viral Hits Awards	2025	Best Male Solo Artist of the Year	Jeff Satur	Nominated	
Trust Gu Thai Film Awards	2025	Original Song	"Rain Wedding"	Won	
YUniverse Awards	2022	Best OST for a Series	"Why Don't You Stay" (แค่เธอ)	Won	
Zoomdara Awards	2025	Hottest Hit of the Year	"Fade"	Nominated	
