= The Paradise of Thorns =

2024 romantic drama film

- Theatrical release poster
- Directed by: Naruebet Kuno
- Screenplay by: Naruebet Kuno; Naron Cherdsoongnern; Karakade Norasethaporn
- Produced by: Vanridee Pongsittisak; Yannassma Thannitsch
- Starring: Jeff Satur; Engfa Waraha
- Cinematography: Tawanwad Wanavit
- Edited by: Piriyakorn Cotchadorn; Rungrot Ounwong
- Music by: Vichaya Vatanasapt
- Production companies: GDH 559; Jor Kwang Film; Jai Studios
- Release dates: 22 August 2024 (Thailand); 6 September 2024 (Toronto)
- Running time: 131 minutes
- Country: Thailand
- Language: Thai

The Paradise of Thorns (Thai: วิมานหนาม) is a 2024 Thai romantic drama film directed and written by Naruebet Kuno in his feature directorial debut. The film stars Jeff Satur and Engfa Waraha. The film was released theatrically in Thailand on 22 August 2024 and had its international premiere at the 2024 Toronto International Film Festival on 6 September 2024.

== Premise ==
An unmarried gay couple starts a durian farm together. When one of them dies, the surviving partner fights to regain their shared property, which is seized by his family.

Thongkham (Jeff Satur) and Sek (Pongsakorn Mettarikanon), a same-sex couple, have dedicated themselves to hard work and have managed to acquire a large house, land, and durian orchard in Mae Hong Son province. They had hoped to make this place their happy sanctuary. However, a tragic turn of events occurs when Sek suddenly passes away. Thongkham also discovers the harsh reality of Thai law, which does not recognize same-sex partnerships. As a result, all the assets they had accumulated together, including the house, land, and durian farm, are inherited by Saeng (Seeda Puapimon), Sek's mother. Saeng then brings her adopted daughter, Mo (Engfa Waraha), to live with them at the house. With no other choice, Thongkham must fight against the injustice of the law to protect and reclaim their dream home.

== Cast ==
- Jeff Satur as Thongkham Kronlongsuk
- Engfa Waraha as Mo Jongyoi
- Seeda Puapimon as Nang Saeng Boonkamlue, Sek's mother
- Harit Buayoi (Keng) as Jingna Jongyoi, Mo's younger brother
- Pongsakorn Mettarikanon (Toey) as Seksan Boonkamlue

== Production ==
In March 2023, the project was first announced by GDH 559 at its 2023 press conference under the title The Project D and was scheduled to be released at the end of the year. GDH originally cast Krit Amnuaydechkorn in the role of Thongkham but he withdrew due to scheduling conflict and was eventually replaced by Jeff Satur.

The project had been showcased by GDH 559 at the 2024 Cannes Film Festival.

== Release ==
The Paradise of Thorns was released in Thai theatres on 22 August 2024. The film became the third highest-grossing Thai film of 2024 after grossing more than ฿100 million ($2.9 million). It had its international premiere at the 2024 Toronto International Film Festival on 6 September 2024 during its Discovery program.

The film began screening on 19 September in Australia and New Zealand; 25 September in the Philippines, 27 September in Cambodia, 3 October in Laos, 10 October in Singapore, 1 November in Vietnam, 6 November in Indonesia, and 8 November in Taiwan.

It was released on Netflix on 9 January 2025.

== Awards and nominations ==
Name of the award ceremony, year presented, category, nominee of the award, and the result of the nomination
Award	Year	Category	Nominee/work	Result	Ref.
Baannang Klang Lakorn Awards	2025	Outstanding Performance by an Actress in a Supporting Role – Films (Theatrical and Streaming)	Seeda Puapimon	Won	
Bangkok Pride Awards	2025	Pride Popular of Movie	The Paradise of Thorns	Won	
Feed Y Capital Awards	2024	Film of the Year Award	The Paradise of Thorns	Won	
Ganesha Awards	2025	Best Screenplay	The Paradise of Thorns	Won	
Ganesha Awards	2025	Best Supporting Actress	Seeda Puapimon	Won	
GQ Thailand Men of the Year	2024	Actor of the Year	Jeff Satur	Won	
Howe Awards	2024	Hottest Actress Award	Engfa Waraha	Won	
Jakarta Film Week	2024	Global Feature Award	The Paradise of Thorns	Nominated	
Kazz Awards	2025	Hottest Film Award	The Paradise of Thorns	Won	
Kazz Awards	2025	The Best Actor of the Year	Harit Buayoi	Nominated	
Kom Chad Luek Awards	2025	Best Film	The Paradise of Thorns	Nominated	
Kom Chad Luek Awards	2025	Best Director - Film	Naruebet Kuno	Won	
Kom Chad Luek Awards	2025	Best Actor - Film	Jeff Satur	Won	
Kom Chad Luek Awards	2025	Best Actress - Film	Engfa Waraha	Won	
Kom Chad Luek Awards	2025	Best Supporting Actor - Film	Harit Buayoi	Nominated	
Kom Chad Luek Awards	2025	Best Supporting Actress - Film	Seeda Puapimon	Won	
Kom Chad Luek Awards	2025	Best Screenplay	Naruebet Kuno, Naron Cherdsoongnern, Karakade Norasethaporn	Nominated	
Mchoice & Mint Awards	2025	Best Rookie of the Year	Harit Buayoi	Nominated	
Nine Entertain Awards	2025	Creative Team of the Year	The Paradise of Thorns	Won	
Nine Entertain Awards	2025	Leading Actress of the Year	Engfa Waraha	Won	
Sanook Top of the Year Awards	2024	Best Movie of the Year	The Paradise of Thorns	Won	
Sanook Top of the Year Awards	2024	Best Actor of the Year	Jeff Satur	Nominated	
Sanook Top of the Year Awards	2024	Best Actress of the Year	Engfa Waraha	Won	
Suphannahong National Film Awards	2025	Best Picture	The Paradise of Thorns	Nominated	
Suphannahong National Film Awards	2025	Best Director	Naruebet Kuno	Nominated	
Suphannahong National Film Awards	2025	Best Screenplay	Naruebet Kuno, Naron Cherdsoongnern, Karakade Norasethaporn	Nominated	
Suphannahong National Film Awards	2025	Best Actor	Jeff Satur	Nominated	
Suphannahong National Film Awards	2025	Best Actress	Engfa Waraha	Nominated	
Suphannahong National Film Awards	2025	Best Supporting Actor	Harit Buayoi	Nominated	
Suphannahong National Film Awards	2025	Best Supporting Actress	Seeda Puapimon	Won	
Suphannahong National Film Awards	2025	Best Costume Design	Chayanuch Sewakwatana	Won	
Suphannahong National Film Awards	2025	Best Art Direction	Songsak Kamutira	Won	
Suphannahong National Film Awards	2025	Best Original Score	Hua Lamphong Riddim	Nominated	
Suphannahong National Film Awards	2025	Best Original Song	"Rain Wedding"	Won	
Suphannahong National Film Awards	2025	Best Sound	Naruebet Piemyai	Nominated	
Suphannahong National Film Awards	2025	Best Film Editing	Thammarat Sumetsubhachok	Won	
Suphannahong National Film Awards	2025	Best Cinematography	Tawanwad Wanavit	Won	
Thai Film Director Awards	2025	Best Picture	The Paradise of Thorns	2nd place	
Thai Film Director Awards	2025	Best Director	Naruebet Kuno	2nd place	
Thai Film Director Awards	2025	Best Screenplay	Naruebet Kuno	2nd place	
Thai Film Director Awards	2025	Best Cinematography	The Paradise of Thorns	2nd place	
Thai Film Director Awards	2025	Best Film Editing	The Paradise of Thorns	2nd place	
Thai Film Director Awards	2025	Best Music Score	The Paradise of Thorns	2nd place	
Thai Film Director Awards	2025	Best Actress in Leading Role	Engfa Waraha	2nd place	
Thai Film Director Awards	2025	Best Supporting Actress	Seeda Puapimon	Won	
Thailand Box Office Movie Awards	2024	Movie of the Year	The Paradise of Thorns	Won	
Thailand Box Office Movie Awards	2024	Director of the Year	Naruebet Kuno	Nominated	
Thailand Box Office Movie Awards	2024	Actor of the Year	Jeff Satur	Nominated	
Thailand Box Office Movie Awards	2024	Actress of the Year	Engfa Waraha	Won	
Thailand Box Office Movie Awards	2024	Supporting Actor of the Year	Harit Buayoi	Nominated	
Thailand Box Office Movie Awards	2024	Supporting Actor of the Year	Pongsakorn Mettarikanon	Nominated	
Thailand Box Office Movie Awards	2024	Supporting Actress of the Year	Seeda Puapimon	Won	
Thailand Box Office Movie Awards	2024	Original Soundtrack of the Year	"Rain Wedding"	Won	
Thailand Social Awards	2025	Best Content Performance on Social Media – Movie	The Paradise of Thorns	Nominated	
Thailand Y Content Awards	2024	Best Film	The Paradise of Thorns	Won	
The Viral Hits Awards	2025	Best Film of the Year	The Paradise of Thorns	Won	
The Viral Hits Love Moment Awards	2026	People's Choice Award for Film of Enduring Impact	The Paradise of Thorns	Won	
The Viral Hits Thailand Spotlight Awards	2025	Best Film	The Paradise of Thorns	Won	
Trust Gu Thai Film Awards	2025	Original Score	The Paradise of Thorns	Won	
Trust Gu Thai Film Awards	2025	Original Song	"Rain Wedding"	Won	
Zoomdara Awards	2025	Hottest Movie of the Year	The Paradise of Thorns	Nominated	
