= Ready, Set, Love (TV series) =

2024 Thai television series

- Official series poster
- Also known as: เรดี้ เซ็ต เลิฟ (Ready, Set, Love)
- Thai: เกมชนคนโสด
- Genre: Romantic comedy; Dystopian
- Written by: Rangsima Akarawiwat; Phuwanit Pholdee
- Directed by: Yanyong Kuruangkura; Apizsara Praisin
- Starring: Kemisara Paladesh; Pongtiwat Tangwancharoen; Trisanu Soranun; Nichapalak Thongkham
- Composers: Chapavich Temnitikul; Wuttipon Athiphongkit
- Country of origin: Thailand
- Original language: Thai
- No. of episodes: 6

Production
- Running time: 68 minutes

Original release
- Network: Netflix
- Release: 15 February 2024

Ready, Set, Love (Thai: เกมชนคนโสด, RTGS: Game Chon Khon Sot; lit. 'Single People's Fighting Game') is a 2024 Thai dystopian romantic comedy television series directed by Yanyong Kuruangkura and Apizsara Praisin. It stars Kemisara Paladesh (Belle), Pongtiwat Tangwancharoen (Blue), Trisanu Soranun (Man), and Nichapalak Thongkham (Lilly). The series follows a working-class woman who is unexpectedly entered into a government-sponsored dating game show in a parallel universe where men have become a scarce "national treasure". Consisting of six episodes, it premiered globally on Netflix on 15 February 2024.

== Plot ==
In an alternate universe, a mysterious pandemic beginning in the 1970s caused male birth rates to plummet to less than one percent. Because men have become exceedingly rare, the government designates them as "national treasures" and houses them inside a guarded, luxurious compound called The Farm. Every four years, the state hosts a nationally televised dating competition called Ready, Set, Love, in which single women, known as The Ladies, are selected via a national lottery to compete for the chance to marry one of five eligible men, known as The Gentlemen, and reside in an idyllic village called The Family.

Darika "Day" Chokwithee (Kemisara Paladesh), a resourceful working-class woman, juggles multiple odd jobs to support herself and pay for the cancer treatment of her younger sister, May (Neennara Boonnithipaisit). Without Day's knowledge or consent, May enters her into the Ready, Set, Love lottery, and Day is unexpectedly chosen to compete. Initially reluctant to participate, Day decides to stay in the game after learning that joining The Family will cover May's future medical expenses.

Inside the competition, Day draws the attention of Son (Pongtiwat Tangwancharoen), the most popular of the Gentlemen, sparking a fierce rivalry with Chanel (Nichapalak Thongkham), a wealthy heiress pressured by her mother to secure Son's hand in marriage. Meanwhile, Day's close friend Valentine (Jaytiya Naiwattanakul) infiltrates the show's production crew to search for her missing brother and expose the regime's corruption. As Day and Son grow closer, they begin to uncover a hidden conspiracy behind The Farm and the society they live in.

== Cast ==
=== Main ===
- Kemisara Paladesh (Belle) as Darika "Day" Chokwithee
  - Wanichaya Pornpanarittichai as young Day
- Pongtiwat Tangwancharoen (Blue) as Son Methapitak (Red Gentleman)
  - Pachchun Hiranprateep (Chun) as young Son
- Trisanu Soranun (Man) as Almond (Blue Gentleman)
- Nichapalak Thongkham (Lilly) as Chanel (Lady 01)

=== Supporting ===
- Chayapak Tunprayoon (New) as Paper (Yellow Gentleman)
- Puriphat Jiramethaporn (P.U.) as Max (Purple Gentleman)
- Ryota Omi as Jin (Green Gentleman)
- Neennara Boonnithipaisit (Neen) as May Chokwithee (Day's younger sister)
- Jaytiya Naiwattanakul (Jane) as Valentine
- Natthaweeranuch Thongmee (Ja) as Jenny (show producer)
- Panadda Wongphudee (Boom) as Kwan (Chanel's mother and Eve Capital executive)
- Amanda Charisa Obdam (Da) as Sarah (show host)
- Chakrit Yamnam (Krit) as Son's father
- Kunchanuj Kengkarnka (Kun) as Chun (underground city musician)
- Anongnart Yusananda (Kiw) as Bovy (Chanel's best friend)
- Phutharit Prombandal (Wit) as Non
- Narinthip Phoaiphattharangsakun (Fon) as Nat
- Wae Soul as Nam

== Production ==
The project was directed by Yanyong Kuruangkura, known for teen films such as App War (2018) and Mother Gamer (2020), as part of Netflix Thailand's 2024 content slate. According to Kuruangkura, the concept originated from a "what if" scenario exploring modern demographic trends in which women outnumber men, packaged as a brightly colored romantic comedy to examine themes of personal freedom, gender inequality, and feminism.

To construct a distinct alternate reality, the production utilized stylized art direction, bold color palettes, geometric framing, and negative space. Principal photography took place in Thailand using a single-camera setup.

== Reception ==
Following its premiere, Ready, Set, Love peaked at number two on Netflix's Global Top 10 chart for Non-English television series.

Weerawat Atchutmanat of The Standard praised the series' distinctive art direction and satirical opening, comparing its visual style to Squid Game and The Hunger Games. However, he criticized the middle episodes for losing momentum, noting that the plot relied too heavily on standard romance tropes instead of exploring its themes of class and gender inequality.
