= Project S: The Series =

2017 Thai TV series

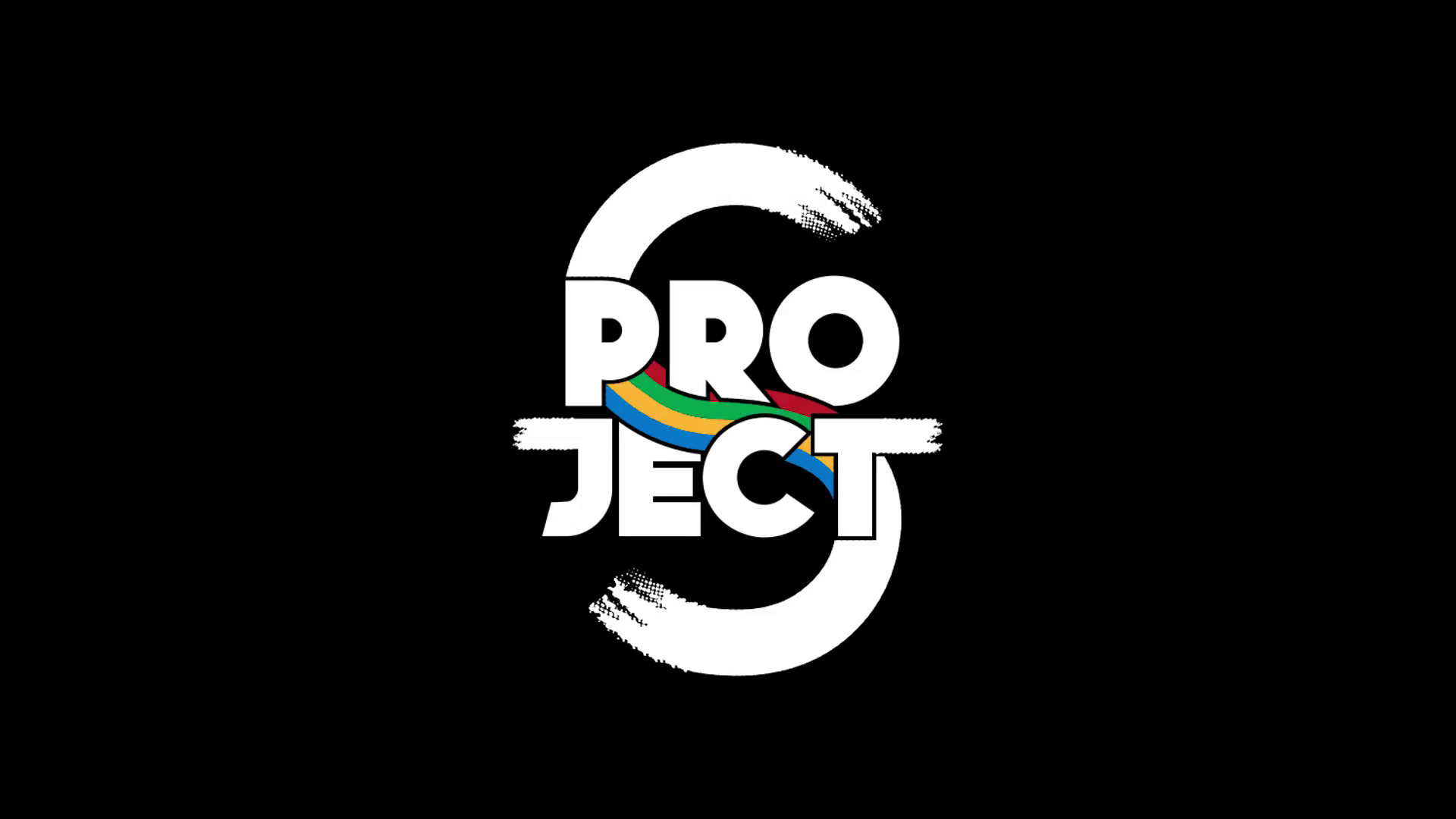
- Official logo
- Genre: Teen drama, Sports
- Directed by: Pitchaya Jarusboonpracha; Naruebet Kuno; Pat Boonnitipat; Tanida Hantaweewatana
- Starring: List of main cast: Oabnithi Wiwattanawarang; Thiti Mahayotaruk; Thanapob Leeratanakachorn; Wongravee Nateetorn; Teeradon Supapunpinyo; Toni Rakkaen; Narikun Ketprapakorn; Krissanapoom Pibulsonggram
- Composer: Terdsak Janpan
- Country of origin: Thailand
- Original language: Thai
- No. of seasons: 4
- No. of episodes: 32 + 2 specials

Production
- Producers: Jina Osothsilp; Suwimon Techasupinan; Songyos Sugmakanan; Kriangkrai Vachiratamporn
- Editor: Foolhouse Production
- Production companies: GDH 559; Nadao Bangkok; Hub Ho Hin Bangkok; Jor Kwang Films

Original release
- Network: GMM 25
- Release: 20 May 2017 – 20 January 2018

Related
- Project 17 (Chinese remake), Hormones: The Series

Project S: The Series is a Thai teen drama television series by GDH 559 and Nadao Bangkok, in association with Hub Ho Hin Bangkok and Jor Kwang Films. It was produced by Songyos Sugmakanan and Kriangkrai Vachiratamporn, and consists of four sports-themed segments, each with eight episodes and directed by a crew member from Nadao's previous series Hormones: Spike! (volleyball); Side by Side (badminton); S.O.S (skateboarding); and Shoot! I Love You (archery). The series was originally broadcast weekly from 20 May 2017 to 20 January 2018 on GMM 25.

== Segments ==
=== Spike! ===
Spike!, directed by Pitchaya Jarusboonpracha, features the story of a school volleyball team attempting to win an annual championship. Puen (Oabnithi Wiwattanawarang) is still recovering from his best friend Singha (Papangkorn Lerkchaleampote)'s decision to leave the team for a rival school, while new recruit Than (Thiti Mahayotaruk) tries hard to earn his trust, under the guidance of Coach Win (Prama Imanotai) and team manager teacher Best (Apinya Sakuljaroensuk). The segment was broadcast from 20 May to 8 July 2017.

=== Side by Side ===
In Side by Side (known in Thai with the subtitle พี่น้องลูกขนไก่, RTGS: Phi Nong Luk Khonkai; directed by Naruebet Kuno), cousins Gym (Thanapob Leeratanakachorn), who is autistic, and Dong (Wongravee Nateetorn) live together with their mothers, widowed sisters Tum (Hattaya Wongkrachang) and Taeng (Suquan Bulakul), and play badminton as a pair. As Gym demonstrates exceptional skills, they begin playing competitively, facing numerous challenges along the way. The segment was broadcast from 15 July to 2 September.

=== S.O.S ===
In S.O.S (subtitled Skate ซึม ซ่าส์, Skate Suem Sa, directed by Pat Boonnitipat), Boo (Teeradon Supapunpinyo), a teenager struggling with major depressive disorder, happens upon a skateboarding group led by Simon (Iirah Wimonchailerk, a.k.a. Toni Rakkaen). He learns to skate under Simon's mentorship, at the same time learning to cope with his condition with support from psychiatrist-in-training Bell (Chayanit Chansangavej) and Simon's sister Baifern (Narupornkamol Chaisang). The segment was broadcast from 9 September to 25 November.

=== Shoot! I Love You ===
Shoot! I Love You (ปิ้ว! ยิงปิ๊งเธอ, Pio! Ying Ping Thoe; directed by Tanida Hantaweewatana), a romantic comedy, is the lightest in tone of the four segments. Bo (Narikun Ketprapakorn), a girl who has never achieved anything, forces her best friend Shan (Krissanapoom Pibulsonggram) to take up archery with her in order to get near her crush Archwin (Chanon Santinatornkul), but soon finds herself also competing for attention with his fellow athlete Fame (Kanyawee Songmuang). The segment was broadcast from 2 December 2017 to 20 January 2018.

== Production ==
Project S was Nadao Bangkok's first major television series to follow the highly successful Hormones, whose three seasons were broadcast from 2013 to 2015. Nadao CEO and Hormones creator Songyos Sugmakanan conceived the series as an outlet for younger members of the Hormones creative team to assume directorial roles. He invited Kriangkrai Vachiratamporn, who had directed Hormones's second and third seasons, to co-produce and oversee the script, and invited four Hormones crew members to join the project as directors: Pitchaya and Naruebet had co-written and co-directed the third season, Tanida was on the writing team for all three seasons, and Pat had been a cinematographer.

Each of the directors picked a sport they wanted to work on, and developed the script from there. The creators wanted each sport to be integral part of the story, and the actors spent months learning and practising their sports. Teeradon lost 8 kilograms (18 lb) for the role and also broke his wrist practising during pre-production, while Thanapob spent almost three months with autistic children to learn and understand their behaviour.

The series was announced on 2 June 2016 in a press event by GDH 559 (Nadao Bangkok's parent company), as part of its upcoming line-up. Hub Ho Hin Bangkok served as production company for Spike! and S.O.S, and Jor Kwang Films for Side by Side and Shoot! I Love You. A blessing ceremony, marking the start of production, was held on 29 November. Filming of the first segment, Spike!, began in December 2016 and concluded in February 2017, with the others following sequentially.

== Release and reception ==
Project S was originally broadcast on Saturdays at 21:45 on GMM 25, beginning with a special introductory episode on 13 May 2017. The segments were broadcast sequentially, with a four-week hiatus in October to observe the royal cremation ceremony of King Bhumibol Adulyadej. It was made available for on-demand streaming via Line TV, and later also became available on Netflix.

While not as popular as Hormones, the series, especially the Side by Side segment, gained a large following and was widely discussed online. Side by Side and S.O.S, and their lead actors Thanapob and Teeradon in particular, were commended for their portrayal of psychiatric issues. Side by Side won three categories at the ninth Nataraja Awards for television and radio programming: Best Drama Series, Best Overall Cast, and Best Lead Actor (for Thanapob).

The series has seen a Chinese remake, titled Project 17, which was released in 2019.

== Awards and nominations ==
Association	Award	Nominee	Result	Reference
32nd Golden Television Awards	Best Lead Actor	Thanapob Leeratanakachorn	Nominated	
32nd Golden Television Awards	Best Supporting Actress	Suquan Bulakul	Nominated	
32nd Golden Television Awards	Best Social TV Drama	Project S: Side by Side	Nominated	
9th Nataraja Awards	Best TV Drama	Project S: Side by Side	Won	
9th Nataraja Awards	Best Team Ensemble	Project S: Side by Side	Won	
9th Nataraja Awards	Best Screenplay	Project S: Side by Side	Nominated	
9th Nataraja Awards	Best Director	Naruebet Kuno	Nominated	
9th Nataraja Awards	Best Actor	Thanapob Leeratanakachorn	Won	
9th Nataraja Awards	Best Supporting Actress	Suquan Bulakul	Nominated	
9th Nataraja Awards	Best Supporting Actress	Hattaya Wongkrachang	Nominated	
9th Nataraja Awards	Best Supporting Actor	Wongravee Nateetorn	Nominated	
9th Nataraja Awards	Best Male Rising Star	Teeradon Supapunpinyo	Nominated	
9th Nataraja Awards	Best Script	Naruebet Kuno, Pattanat Phibunsawat	Nominated	
9th Nataraja Awards	Best Cinematography	Project S: SOS	Nominated	
