= The Antique Shop =

2022 Thai-Singaporean film

- Theatrical release poster
- Original title: ร้านของเก่า
- Directed by: Suphakorn Riansuwan
- Produced by: LeayDoDee Studio, NoonTalk Media
- Starring: Rio Dewanto; Bae Jin-young; Aloysius Pang; Phiravich Attachitsataporn
- Release dates: 2 June 2022 (Thailand, Laos, Cambodia); 1 December 2022 (Singapore)
- Running time: 100 minutes
- Countries: Singapore; Thailand
- Languages: Thai, English
- Box office: 3.6 million baht

The Antique Shop (Thai: ร้านของเก่า; RTGS: Ran Khongkao; lit. Antique Shop) is a 2022 Thai-Singaporean anthology horror film directed by Suphakorn Riansuwan and starring Rio Dewanto, Bae Jin-young, Aloysius Pang and Phiravich Attachitsataporn in the main roles.

== Plot ==
Connected by an antique shop, the movie tells three different stories. The first story is focused on Wadi (played by Rio Dewanto), an Indonesian man seeking a job in Thailand to support his family back home. He ended up working for a gang and was captured by a rival gang. He was tied to a haunted chair and now has to escape from the captors and the spirits haunting the chair. The second story is about Ryan (played by Aloysius Pang), a Singaporean who falls in love with a Thai woman. He wanted to gift a bracelet to the woman as a token of love, but it landed him in a prison cell where an evil spirit materialised. The third story is about Song (played by Bae Jin-young), a South Korean student who studied in Thailand and was bullied by a local student. After Song returned to South Korea, he invited the bully and his best friends to celebrate his birthday.

== Cast ==
=== Antique Shop ===
- Xu Bin as Andy, a businessman from Singapore, who came across an antique shop.
- Damien Teo as Alec, the assistant of Madam, the shop's owner.
- Pijika Chittaputta as Madam, the owner of the shop.

=== Survive (Chair of Death) ===
- Rio Dewanto as Wadi, an Indonesian man who fled to Thailand in order to earn money for his family and send them in a safe place.
- Pakachon Voonsri (Frank) as Krit, the leader of the mafia gang that captured Wadi.

=== Half Second (Bracelets of Love) ===
- Aloysius Pang as Ryan, a tourist who fell in love with a Thai woman, to which he gifted a bracelet that unbeknownst to him, leads him to an accident.

=== Happy Birthday (Knife of Vengeance) ===
- Bae Jin-young as Song, a Korean student that transferred to a school in Thailand. He invites to his birthday party three former classmates of his, who bullied him.
- Phiravich Attachitsataporn (Mean) as Champion, one of the students that targeted Song and the main bully.
- Chayapak Tunprayoon (New) as Win, one of Champion's friends.
- Setthapong Eosuk (Gun) as Tae, one of Champion's friends.
- Natpatsorn Janjarearn (Yiwa) as a maid, that works in Song's house.

== Production ==
The movie was in production as early as in 2018, with Aloysius Pang having filmed some scenes in Thailand before his death on 24 January 2019 during a military reservist exercise. The production was then delayed due to Pang's death, and then further delayed due to COVID-19 pandemic. Production resumed in 2022, now with fellow actors Xu Bin and Damien Teo filming as well. To deal with the death of Pang, the original storyline was now split into three parts. The production was initiated by NoonTalk Media, was filmed in Thailand with LeayDoDee Studio and directed by Thai director Suphakorn Riensuwan, due to "Thailand's reputation for producing supernatural films". The film schedule for the third story, which Bae Jin-young, Xu, and Teo were cast in, was difficult to arrange as finding out it was difficult to find a South Korean artist with a suitable block of free time and Teo was in national service. This would be Bae's debut film and Pang's final posthumous film release.

The film was released in Thailand on 2 June 2022. The Singapore release was delayed to 1 December 2022 as NoonTalk Media's boss Dasmond Koh wanting to avoid releasing the movie during the Chinese New Year festivities.

== Reception ==
=== Reviews ===
TrueID reviewed the movie as having a certain level of horror, but mild compared to most Thai supernatural movies.

=== Box office ===
The film placed third in the list of films that gained more money in the first week of June and sixth in the second week, grossing 0.18 million baht. It also grossed 320,000 baht on its first day of release and 1.58 million baht in the first week.
