= Jina Osothsilp =

Thai film studio executive

Jina Osothsilp (Thai: จินา โอสถศิลป์) is a Thai film studio executive. She is CEO of GDH 559, one of Thailand's largest film studios, as well as its predecessor GMM Tai Hub (GTH). Jina graduated from the Faculty of Communication Arts at Chulalongkorn University, and began working in the advertising industry. She joined Jira Maligool's production company Hub Ho Hin Bangkok in 1991, and helped found GTH, a joint venture between Hub Ho Hin, GMM Pictures and Tai Entertainment, in 2003.
