= Naruebet Kuno =

Thai director (born 1991)

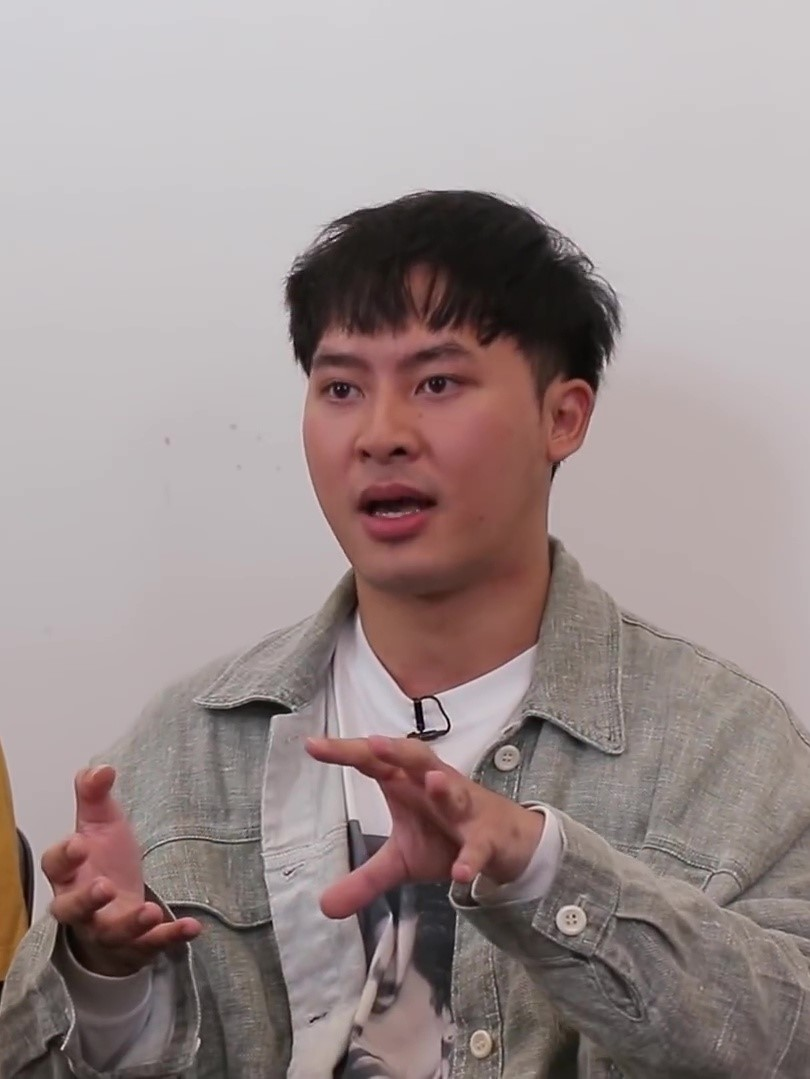
- Born: 19 March 1991 (age 35); Hat Yai District, Songkhla Province, Thailand
- Other name: Boss
- Occupations: Director, screenwriter
- Years active: 2015–present

Naruebet Kuno (Thai: นฤเบศ กูโน, born 19 March 1991), nicknamed Boss, is a Thai director and screenwriter, best known for his work with GDH 559 and Nadao Bangkok. Naruebet's recent works focus on representation of LGBTQ+ stories.

== Early life ==
Naruebet grew up in Hat Yai, and graduated from Hatyaiwittayalai School. He then attended Chulalongkorn University in Bangkok, under the Faculty of Communication Arts where he directed the faculty's annual play and also became known from a viral video promoting the 69th Chula–Thammasat Traditional Football Match in 2013.

== Career ==
After graduating, Naruebet was invited by Kriangkrai Vachiratamporn to join the writing team of the third season of film studio GTH and its affiliate Nadao Bangkok's teen drama series Hormones. He later also became a co-director.

In 2016, Kriangkrai and Nadao Bangkok CEO Songyos Sugmakanan invited him to direct a segment in their new series Project S, which was released under GTH's successor GDH 559. Naruebet created "Side by Side", a drama about an autistic teen playing competitive badminton with his cousin, writing the screenplay with Pattaranad Bhiboonsawad. The series was very positively received.

Naruebet directed the 2019 romantic-comedy series My Ambulance for Nadao Bangkok. He went on to direct the Nadao Bangkok series I Told Sunset About You. Distributed by Line TV, the series features the relationship between two teenage boys, starring actors who played side characters in My Ambulance. He co-produced part two of the series, titled I Promised You the Moon, which was released in 2021 and was preceded by the short film Last Twilight in Phuket, also directed by Naruebet.

In 2024, Naruebet released his debut feature film, The Paradise of Thorns, with GDH. He directed the film, and wrote the screenplay with Naron Cherdsoongnern and Karakede Norasethaporn. The film was released during the legalization process of same-sex marriage in Thailand, but before the law was officially passed. The film is about a man who struggles to inherit the durian orchard owned by him and his dead partner, as their same-sex partnership is not recognized by Thai law.

In 2025, Naruebet started the production company Looke. Under Looke and distributed by iQIYI, he wrote and directed the series Gelboys. A teen drama, Gelboys features Siam Square and Gen-Z youth culture, including social media and nail art.

== Filmography ==
=== Film ===
Year	Title	Title in Thai	Credits
2024	The Paradise of Thorns	วิมานหนาม	Director, screenwriter

=== Television series ===
Year	Title	Title in Thai	Credits
2015	Hormones 3 The Final Season	ฮอร์โมนส์ วัยว้าวุ่น ซีซั่น 3	Screenwriter, co-director
2016	Yoo Tee Rao	อยู่ที่เรา	Co-director
2016	I Hate You, I Love You		Screenwriter, co-director
2017	Project S The Series "Side By Side"	พี่น้องลูกขนไก่	Director, screenwriter
2019	My Ambulance	รักฉุดใจนายฉุกเฉิน	Director, screenwriter
2020	I Told Sunset About You	แปลรักฉันด้วยใจเธอ พาร์ท 1	Director, screenwriter
2021	I Promised You the Moon	แปลรักฉันด้วยใจเธอ พาร์ท 2	Co-producer
2025	Gelboys	สถานะกั๊กใจ	Director, producer, screenwriter

== Awards and nominations ==
Year	Award	Category	Nominated work	Result	Refs.
2018	9th Nataraja Awards	Best Director	Project S The Series: "Side by Side"	Nominated	
2018	9th Nataraja Awards	Best Script (with Pattanat Phibunsawat)	Project S The Series: "Side by Side"	Nominated	
2020	11th Nataraja Awards	Best Director	My Ambulance	Nominated	
2021	17th Kom Chad Luek Awards	Best Screenplay (with Arachaporn Pokinpakorn, Karakade Norasethaporn, Naron Cherdsoongnern)	I Told Sunset About You	Nominated	
2021	17th Kom Chad Luek Awards	Best Director	I Told Sunset About You	Nominated	
2025	Thailand Box Office Movie & Series Awards 2024	Director of the Year	The Paradise of Thorns	Nominated	
2025	21st Kom Chad Luek Awards	Best Director – Film	The Paradise of Thorns	Won	
2025	Suphannahong National Film Awards	Best Director	The Paradise of Thorns	Nominated	
2026	Y Universe Awards 2025	The Best Series Director	Gelboys	Won	
