= Jeff Satur discography =

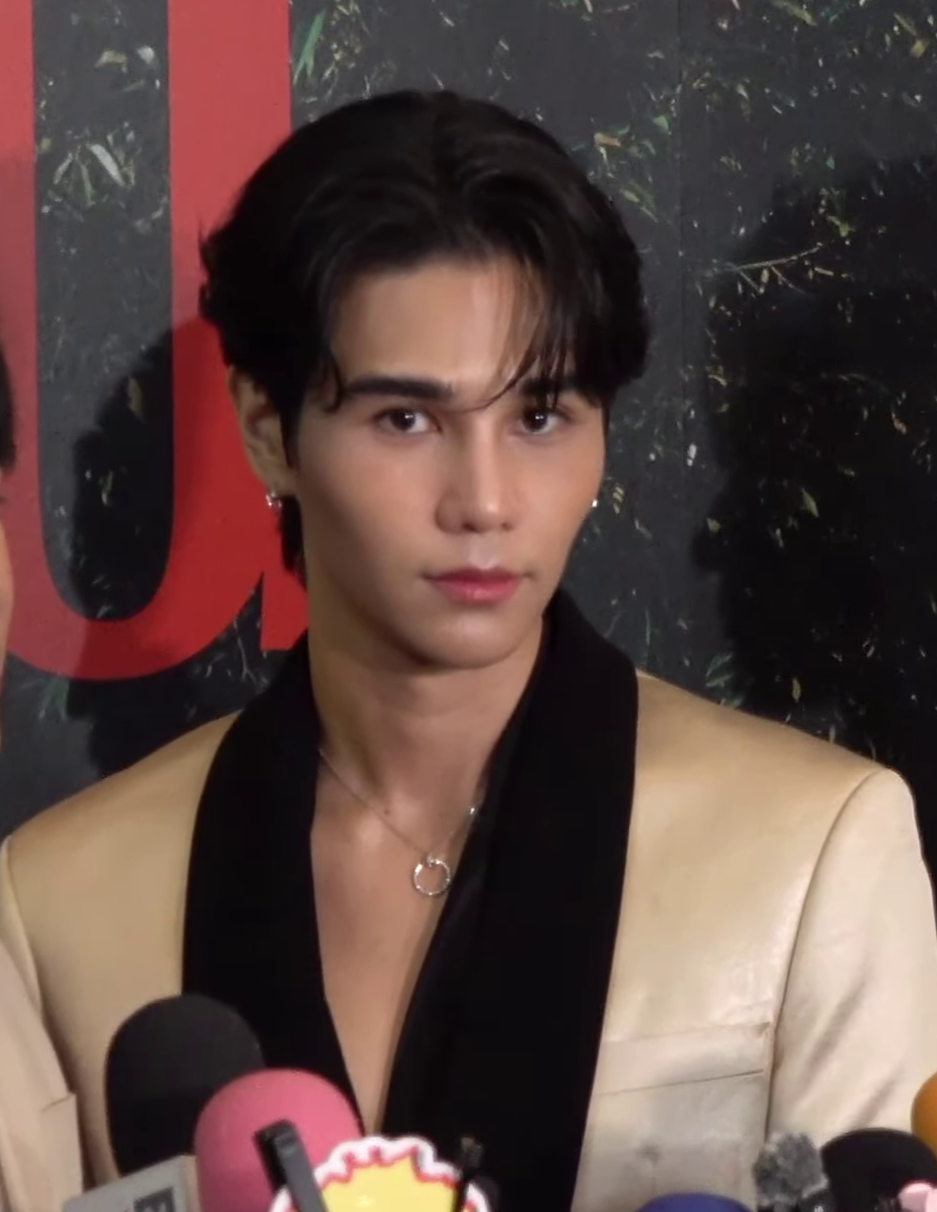
- Satur in 2024
- Studio albums: 1
- Singles: 32
- Soundtracks: 14

The discography of Thai recording artist Jeff Satur consists of one studio album, one extended play, 32 singles and 14 soundtrack appearances. His debut studio album, Space Shuttle No. 8, was released in February 2024. The album produced the single "Ghost" (ซ่อน(ไม่)หา), which reached number one on the Billboard Top Thai Songs chart.

== Studio albums ==
List of studio albums, with selected details
Title	Details
Space Shuttle No. 8	Released: February 8, 2024; Label: Wayfer Records; Formats: digital download, streaming; Tracklist: 1. "Dum Dum"; 2. "Hide" (แค่เงา); 3. "Lucid" (ก่อนที่เธอจะลืมฝัน); 4. "Loop" (วันนี้คือพรุ่งนี้ของเมื่อวาน); 5. "Highway"; 6. "Complicated" (ทำไมมันยาก); 7. "Ghost" (ซ่อน(ไม่)หา); 8. "Yellow Leaf" (ส่วนน้อย); 9. "Fade" (ลืมไปแล้วว่ายังไง); 10. "Black Tie"; 11. "Almost Over You"; 12. "Hide (English Version)"; 13. "Fade (English Version)"; 14. "Lucid (English Version)"; 15. "Dum Dum (English Version)"; 16. "Fade (我最愛的就是你) (Chinese Version)"; 17. "Stranger"; 18. "Saturdayss"

== Extended plays ==
List of extended plays, with selected details
Title	Details
Red Giant	Released: November 17, 2025; Label: Wayfer Records; Formats: digital download, streaming; Tracklist: 1. "Ride or Die"; 2. "Passion Fruit"; 3. "Tell Me the Name"; 4. "Golden Night (English Version)"; 5. "Call It Over"; 6. "Golden Night" (ของขวัญปีใหม่)

== Singles ==
=== Thai singles ===
Title	Year	Peak chart positions	Album
Title	Year	Top Thai Songs	Album
"Broken World" (โลกแตก)	2013	—	Non-album singles
"Miss You Like Crazy" (คิดถึงเธอแทบจะตายแล้ว)	2013	—	Non-album singles
"Afraid to Say" (ไม่กล้าบอกชัด)	2014	—	Non-album singles
"Still" (ไม่หายไป)	2015	—	Non-album singles
"Changed" (เปลี่ยนไปแล้ว)	2018	—	Non-album singles
"Set Free" (ปล่อยมือ)	2019	—	Non-album singles
"Good Story" (เรื่องดีดี)	2020	—	Non-album singles
"Holding On" (อยู่..)	2021	—	Non-album singles
"Surreal" (จริงเกิน)	2021	—	Non-album singles
"Highway"	2021	—	Space Shuttle No.8
"Call Me Your Brother" (ความลับ)	2022	—	Non-album single
"Complicated" (ทำไมมันยาก)	2022	—	Space Shuttle No.8
"Loop" (วันนี้คือพรุ่งนี้ของเมื่อวาน)	2022	—	Space Shuttle No.8
"Hide" (แค่เงา)	2022	—	Space Shuttle No.8
"Fade" (ลืมไปแล้วว่าลืมยังไง)	2022	2	Space Shuttle No.8
"Dum Dum"	2023	5	Space Shuttle No.8
"Lucid" (ก่อนที่เธอจะลืมฝัน)	2023	—	Space Shuttle No.8
"Ghost" (ซ่อน(ไม่)หา)	2023	1	Space Shuttle No.8
"Make a Bold Move" (ฟังเพลง ไม่กล้า ไม่เกิด)	2024	—	Non-album singles
"Lost and Found" (ฉันก่อนเจอเธอ)	2025	—	Non-album singles
"Golden Night" (ของขวัญปีใหม่)	2025	—	Red Giant
"Grief Eaters" (ที่ชอบที่ชอบ)	2026	—	Non-album single

=== English singles ===
Title	Year	Peak chart positions	Album
Title	Year	THA (Note: The Official Southeast Asia Charts launched in January 2025.)	Album
"Hide"	2022	—	Space Shuttle No.8
"Fade"	2022	—	Space Shuttle No.8
"Black Tie"	2023	—	Space Shuttle No.8
"Ride or Die"	2025	18	Red Giant
"Tell Me The Name"	2025	—	Red Giant

=== As featured artist ===
Title	Year	Peak chart positions	Album
Title	Year	THA (Note: The Official Southeast Asia Charts launched in January 2025.)	Album
"Last Sunset" (ปีใหม่ปีนี้) (Saran feat. Jeff Satur)	2021	—N/a	Non-album single
"Far" (Silvy feat. Jeff Satur)	2022	—N/a	Silvy
"Scar" (แผลเป็น) (Bodyslam feat. Jeff Satur)	2024	—N/a	Non-album singles
"Circus" (ลามปาม) (Bowkylion feat. Jeff Satur)	2025	3	Non-album singles
"Time Flies" (Nont Tanont feat. Jeff Satur)	2025	13	Non-album singles
"More Than Friend" (มากกว่าfriend) (BamBam feat. Jeff Satur)	2025	—	Hometown

== Soundtrack appearances ==
Title	Year	Peak chart positions	Album
Title	Year	Top Thai Songs	Album
แค่ได้รัก	2016	—	Buang Rak Salak Kaen OST
"Comedy"	2020	—	He She It OST
"Comedy (Tragedy)"	2020	—	He She It OST
"Moment" (เวลานี้)	2020	—	Ingredients OST
"Goodbye Not Goodbye"	2021	—	Ingredients OST
"Stay Together"	2021	—	Love Area OST
"Love Area" (ที่ตรงนี้)	2021	—	Love Area OST
"Warm Heart" (อุ่นหัวใจ)	2022	—	The Tuxedo OST
"Because of You" (เพราะเธอ)	2022	—	The Tuxedo OST
"Secretly Admired" (ทำได้แค่มอง)	2022	—	My Secret Love OST
"Why Don't You Stay" (แค่เธอ)	2022	26	KinnPorsche OST
"Why Don't You Stay (WorldTour Ver.)"	2022	—	KinnPorsche OST
"Stranger"	2022	—	Closer OST
"Rain Wedding" (เหมือนวิวาห์)	2024	1	The Paradise of Thorns OST

== Collaborations ==
Title	Year	Album
"Silence" (ความเงียบคือคำตอบ) (with Mean Band)	2022	Non-album singles
"Steal the Show" (with Shaun)	2023	Non-album singles
"King Power" (อยากรู้จัก ไม่รู้จบ) (with Jaylerr, Kanyawee Songmuang and 4Eve)	2023	Non-album singles
