= Nataraja Awards =

Award ceremony for television and radio

- Native name: รางวัลนาฏราช
- Description: Excellence in television and radio in Thailand
- Country: Thailand
- Presented by: Radio-Television Broadcasting Professional Confederation (RTBPF)
- First award: 16 May 2010; 16 years ago
- Final award: 2025
- Website: rtbpf.org

The Nataraja Awards (Thai: รางวัลนาฏราช) is the most prestigious award ceremony for television and radio in Thailand, often compared to the Oscars by the local press due to its rigorous selection process conducted by industry professionals.

== History and process ==
Established in 2010 by the Radio-Television Broadcasting Professional Confederation (RTBPF), the award's key differentiator is that winners are chosen through peer voting: actors vote for best actor, directors for best director, etc.

The voting process is audited by PricewaterhouseCoopers (PwC), the same company that audits the Oscars, ensuring transparency and credibility.

== Main categories ==
- Best Drama
- Best Actor
- Best Actress
- Best Director
- Best Screenplay
