= List of awards and nominations received by Sarocha Chankimha =

Sarocha Chankimha awards and nominations
- Sarocha in January 2023
Awards and nominations
Award	Wins	Nominations
Bangkok Pride Awards	1	2
Bic Seven Awards	1	0
BreakTudo Awards	8	0
Dailynews Awards	1	0
EFM Fandon	1	0
Feed x Khaosod Awards	0	6
Feed Y Awards	1	0
Feed Y Capital Awards	2	0
GQ Men of The Year	1	0
Harper’s Bazaar Women of the Year	1	0
Hashtag Legend Thailand	1	0
Howe Awards	3	3
HUB Awards	8	0
Japan Expo Awards	1	0
Kazz Awards	13	0
Kom Chad Luek Awards	3	1
Lesbonice	3	0
Madame Mount Awards	0	1
Maya TV Awards	6	6
Mellow Pop	2	0
Mint Awards	3	0
Nakarat Awards	0	2
Nine Entertain Awards	4	3
Sanook Top of the Year Awards	5	0
SEC Awards	5	0
Superstar Idol Awards	2	4
Superstar Maya Idol Awards	1	1
Suphannahong National Film Awards	1	1
Thai Update Awards	4	0
Thailand Box Office Awards	0	5
Thailand Headlines Person of the Year Awards	1	0
Thailand Moral Awards	1	0
Thailand Social Awards	5	0
Thailand Y Content Awards	1	2
Thairath Awards	2	0
The Viral Hits Awards	0	4
Tpop Stage	8	7
Y Universe Awards	3	1
Y Entertain Awards	2	3
Zoomdara Awards	0	1

Totals (Note: Certain award groups do not simply award one winner. They acknowledge several different recipients, have runners-up, and have third place. Since this is a specific recognition and is different from losing an award, runner-up mentions are considered wins in this award tally. For simplification and to avoid errors, each award in this list has been presumed to have had a prior nomination.)
- Wins: 106
- Nominations: 49

Sarocha Chankimha is a Thai actress, singer, model and entrepreneur. who has won many accolades and nominations throughout her career, including the Nine Entertain Awards, the Kazz Awards, the Maya TV Awards and the Kom Chad Luek Awards. The artist has received a total of 106 awards out of 49 nominations.

From 2022 to 2023, Freen starred alongside Rebecca Patricia Armstrong in the IdolFactory channel sitcom Gap the series. For her performance as Samanan Anantrakul and her work on the show's soundtrack, she was nominated for two Tpop Stage and one Y Universe Awards. she made her acting debut in the drama Gap the series, for which she received the Kazz Awards for Saowaisai. In the same year, she landed her first leading role, for which she received Best Female from several institutions and also received nominations for the Kazz Awards, Kom Chad Luek Awards, Maya TV Awards, Nataraja Awards for Best Rising Star and as well as earning nominations for Nine Entertain Awards.

In 2024, she received her first Y Entertain Awards for her performance in the drama The Loyal Pin, for which she won two Kazz Awards, one SEC Awards, one BreakTudo Awards and one Thailand Social Awards, and her performance in her debut film, Uranus 2324, earned him the Best Movie awards from the Suphannahong National Film Awards, the Thailand Social Awards, the Bangkok Pride Awards, and the Thailand Moral Awards.

In 2026, she took on the lead role in the drama 4 Elements : The Air, for which she received Feed x Khaosod Awards, Maya TV Awards and BreakTudo Awards.

== Accolades ==
=== Awards and nominations ===
Name of the award ceremony, year presented, category, nominee of the award, and the result of the nomination
Award	Year	Category	Nominee work	Result	Ref.
Bangkok Pride Awards	2025	Pride Popular of Series / Drama	The Loyal Pin	Nominated	
Bangkok Pride Awards	2025	Pride Popular of Sapphic Series Star	(with Becky Armstrong)	Nominated	
Bangkok Pride Awards	2026	Pride Popular of Movie	Uranus 2324	Won	
Bic Seven Awards (Brazil)	2024	LGBTQ+ Spotlight	Gap The Series	Won	
BreakTudo Awards (Brazil)	2023	Fictional Ship	Gap The Series	Won	
BreakTudo Awards (Brazil)	2024	International Fandom of the Year	(with Becky Armstrong)	Won	
BreakTudo Awards (Brazil)	2024	Fictional Ship	The Loyal Pin	Won	
BreakTudo Awards (Brazil)	2025	International Fandom of the Year	(with Becky Armstrong)	Won	
BreakTudo Awards (Brazil)	2025	Crush International	Freen Sarocha	Won	
BreakTudo Awards (Brazil)	2026	International Fandom of the Year	(with Becky Armstrong)	Won	
BreakTudo Awards (Brazil)	2026	GL Series of the Year	The Air	Won	
BreakTudo Awards (Brazil)	2026	International Crush	Freen Sarocha	Won	
Dailynews Awards	2024	Couple of the Year	(with Becky Armstrong)	Won	
EFM Fandom Awards	2024	Sissss of the Year	(with Becky Armstrong)	Won	
Feed x Khaosod Awards	2025	Best Chemistry	(with Becky Armstrong)	Nominated	
Feed x Khaosod Awards	2025	Popular Drama Series	The Loyal Pin	Nominated	
Feed x Khaosod Awards	2025	Top-Tier GL Series of the Year	The Loyal Pin	Nominated	
Feed x Khaosod Awards	2025	Girls' Love Actress of the Year	Freen Sarocha	Nominated	
Feed x Khaosod Awards	2025	Couple of the Year	(with Becky Armstrong)	Nominated	
Feed x Khaosod Awards	2026	Popular Drama Awards	The Air	Nominated	
Feed Y Awards	2024	Most Popular Couple	(with Becky Armstrong)	Won	
Feed Y Capital Awards	2023	Most Popular Couple	(with Becky Armstrong)	Won	
Feed Y Capital Awards	2023	Popular Series	Gap The Series	Won	
GQ Men of The Year	2023	Nation's Trending Stars	(with Becky Armstrong)	Won	
Harper’s Bazaar Women of the Year	2025	Breakthrough	Freen Sarocha	Won	
Hashtag Legend Thailand	2026	100 List Social Club 2026 - Super Stars	Freen Sarocha	Won	
Howe Awards	2023	The Best Couple Award	(with Becky Armstrong)	Won	
Howe Awards	2023	Hottest Series	Gap The Series	Won	
Howe Awards	2024	Popular Awards	Freen Sarocha	Nominated	
Howe Awards	2025	Howe Hottest Actress Award	Freen Sarocha	Nominated	
Howe Awards	2025	Hottest The Best Couple Award	(with Becky Armstrong)	Nominated	
Howe Awards	2025	Howe Hottest Series Award	The Loyal Pin	Nominated	
Howe Awards	2025	The 50 Influential People 2025	Freen Sarocha	Won	
HUB Awards (Brazil)	2024	Couple of the Year	(with Becky Armstrong)	Won	
HUB Awards (Brazil)	2024	Chemistry of the Year	(with Becky Armstrong)	Won	
HUB Awards (Brazil)	2024	Actress of the Year	Freen Sarocha	Won	
HUB Awards (Brazil)	2024	Main Couple of the Year	(with Becky Armstrong)	Won	
HUB Awards (Brazil)	2024	Kiss Scene of the Year	The Loyal Pin	Won	
HUB Awards (Brazil)	2024	Dramatic Scene of the Year	The Loyal Pin	Won	
HUB Awards (Brazil)	2025	Most Anticipated Premiere	4 Elements	Won	
Japan Expo Award (Japan)	2024	Japan Expo Actors Award	(with Becky Armstrong)	Won	
Kazz Awards	2023	Saowaisai 2022 (3rd place)	Freen Sarocha	Won	
Kazz Awards	2023	Series of the Year	Gap The Series	Won	
Kazz Awards	2023	Popular Female Teenage Award	Freen Sarocha	Won	
Kazz Awards	2023	Couple of the Year	(with Becky Armstrong)	Won	
Kazz Awards	2024	Couple of the Year	(with Becky Armstrong)	Won	
Kazz Awards	2024	Popular Vote	Freen Sarocha	Won	
Kazz Awards	2025	Series of The Year	The Loyal Pin	Won	
Kazz Awards	2025	Couple of the Year 2025	(with Becky Armstrong)	Won	
Kazz Awards	2025	Popular Female Teenage Award 2025	Freen Sarocha	Won	
Kazz Awards	2025	Superstar Award 2025	Freen Sarocha	Won	
Kazz Awards	2026	Hottest Film Award	Rakhi (The Stain)	Won	
Kazz Awards	2026	The Best Actress Of The Year	Freen Sarocha	Won	
Kazz Awards	2026	Couple Of The Year	(with Becky Armstrong)	Won	
Kom Chad Luek Awards	2024	Best Couple of the Year	(with Becky Armstrong)	Won	
Kom Chad Luek Awards	2024	Most Popular Actress	Freen Sarocha	Won	
Kom Chad Luek Awards	2025	Popular Actress	Freen Sarocha	Nominated	
Kom Chad Luek Awards	2025	Popular Couple	(with Becky Armstrong)	Won	
Lesbonice (Brazil)	2024	Top Best Kiss	Gap The Series	Won	
Lesbonice (Brazil)	2024	Biggest Couple	The Loyal Pin	Won	
Lesbonice (Brazil)	2025	Iconic Sapphic	Gap The Series	Won	
Madame Mount Awards	2025	Couple of the Year	(with Becky Armstrong)	Nominated	
Maya TV Awards	2023	Song of the Year Award	Pink Theory	Nominated	
Maya TV Awards	2023	Female Rising Star of the Year	Freen Sarocha	Won	
Maya TV Awards	2023	Couple of the Year	(with Becky Armstrong)	Won	
Maya TV Awards	2024	Charming Female of the Year	Freen Sarocha	Nominated	
Maya TV Awards	2024	Popular Award	Freen Sarocha	Won	
Maya TV Awards	2024	Couple of the Year	(with Becky Armstrong)	Won	
Maya TV Awards	2025	Charming Female of the Year	Freen Sarocha	Nominated	
Maya TV Awards	2025	Popular Vote	Freen Sarocha	Nominated	
Maya TV Awards	2025	Female Couple of the Year	(with Becky Armstrong)	Won	
Maya TV Awards	2026	Charming Woman of the year	Freen Sarocha	Nominated	
Maya TV Awards	2026	Popular vote of the year	Freen Sarocha	Nominated	
Maya TV Awards	2026	Female Couple of the year	(with Becky Armstrong)	Won	
Mellow Pop	2023	Top Viral Idol Chart March	(with Becky Armstrong)	Won	
Mellow Pop	2024	Best Couple of the Month	(with Becky Armstrong)	Won	
Mint Awards	2024	Best Cover of the Year	Freen Sarocha	Won	
Mint Awards	2024	Best Digital Cover of the Year	(with Becky Armstrong)	Won	
Mint Awards	2025	Best Digital Cover of the Year - December 2024	(with Becky Armstrong)	Won	
Nakarat Awards	2023	People's Choice	(with Becky Armstrong)	Nominated	
Nakarat Awards	2023	Rising star of the Year	Freen Sarocha	Nominated	
Nine Entertain Awards	2023	People's Choice	(with Becky Armstrong)	Won	
Nine Entertain Awards	2024	Couple of the Year	(with Becky Armstrong)	Won	
Nine Entertain Awards	2024	People's Choice	Freen Sarocha	Nominated	
Nine Entertain Awards	2025	Couple of the Year	(with Becky Armstrong)	Won	
Nine Entertain Awards	2025	People's Choice	Freen Sarocha	Nominated	
Nine Entertain Awards	2026	Couple of the Year	(with Becky Armstrong)	Won	
Nine Entertain Awards	2026	People's Choice	Freen Sarocha	Nominated	
Sanook Top of the Year Awards	2023	The Best Couple Award	(with Becky Armstrong)	Won	
Sanook Top of the Year Awards	2023	Female Rising Star	Freen Sarocha	Won	
Sanook Top of the Year Awards	2023	The Best Series of the Year	Gap The Series	Won	
Sanook Top of the Year Awards	2025	Best Couple of the year	(with Becky Armstrong)	Won	
Sanook Top of the Year Awards	2025	The Best Series of the Year	The Loyal Pin	Won	
SEC Awards (Brazil)	2023	Favorite Couple in a Series	(with Becky Armstrong)	Won	
SEC Awards (Brazil)	2023	Best Asian Series	Gap The Series	Won	
SEC Awards (Brazil)	2025	Favorite Couple	The Loyal Pin	Won	
SEC Awards (Brazil)	2025	Asian Series Performance	The Loyal Pin	Won	
SEC Awards (Brazil)	2026	International Crush of the Year	Freen Sarocha	Won	
Superstar Idol Awards	2025	Superstar Best Actress	Freen Sarocha	Nominated	
Superstar Idol Awards	2025	Best [Y] Actress	Freen Sarocha	Nominated	
Superstar Idol Awards	2025	Superstar Female Couple	(with Becky Armstrong)	Nominated	
Superstar Idol Awards	2025	Best [Y] Original Soundtrack	Cheevee	Won	
Superstar Idol Awards	2026	Idol of the Year	Freen Sarocha	Won	
Superstar Idol Awards	2026	Popular Female Couple of the Year	(with Becky Armstrong)	Nominated	
Superstar Maya Idol Awards	2023	Superstar Maya Idol Female	Freen Sarocha	Won	
Superstar Maya Idol Awards	2023	Superstar Maya Idol Couple	(with Becky Armstrong)	Nominated	
Suphannahong National Film Awards	2025	Popular Movie	Uranus 2324	Won	
Suphannahong National Film Awards	2025	Popular Movie	Rider	Nominated	
Thai Update Awards	2023	The Best TV Series	Gap The Series	Won	
Thai Update Awards	2023	The Most Favorite Young Female Star Group A	Freen Sarocha	Won	
Thai Update Awards	2024	The Most Favorite On-Screen Couple	(with Becky Armstrong)	Won	
Thai Update Awards	2024	Popular Star Awards	Freen Sarocha	Won	
Thailand Box Office Awards	2025	Best Couple of the Year	(with Becky Armstrong)	Nominated	
Thailand Box Office Awards	2025	Actress Series of the Year	The Loyal Pin	Nominated	
Thailand Box Office Awards	2025	Series of the Year (GL)	The Loyal Pin	Nominated	
Thailand Box Office Awards	2025	Movies of the Year	Uranus 2324	Nominated	
Thailand Box Office Awards	2025	Actress Movie of the Year	Uranus 2324	Nominated	
Thailand Headlines Person of the Year Awards (China)	2024	The Most Popular on-screen Couple of the Year Award	(with Becky Armstrong)	Won	
Thailand Moral Awards	2024	Honorable Mention - Film	Uranus 2324	Won	
Thailand Social Awards	2024	Best Creator Performance on Social Media - Actor & Actress	Freen Sarocha	2nd place	
Thailand Social Awards	2024	Best Content Performance on Social Media (Thai Series)	Gap The Series	2nd place	
Thailand Social Awards	2025	Best Creator Performance on Social Media - (Actor & Actress)	Freen Sarocha	2nd place	
Thailand Social Awards	2025	Best Content Performance on Social Media - (Movie)	Uranus 2324	2nd place	
Thailand Social Awards	2025	Best Content Performance on Social Media - (Series)	The Loyal Pin	Won	
Thailand Y Content Awards	2024	Best series	The Loyal Pin	Nominated	
Thailand Y Content Awards	2024	Best Leading Actress	Freen Sarocha	Nominated	
Thailand Y Content Awards	2024	Couple of the Year	(with Becky Armstrong)	Won	
Thairath Awards	2025	Female Couple of the Year	(with Becky Armstrong)	Won	
Thairath Awards	2025	Most Popular Celebrity of the Year	Freen Sarocha	Won	
The Viral Hits Awards	2024	Most Popular Yuri Series of the Year Award	Gap The Series	Nominated	
The Viral Hits Awards	2024	Most Popular Yuri Series of the Year Award	The Loyal Pin	Nominated	
The Viral Hits Awards	2024	Best Yuri Series Couple of the Year Award	(with Becky Armstrong)	Nominated	
The Viral Hits Awards	2025	Best Yuri Couple Of The Year	(with Becky Armstrong)	Nominated	
The Viral Hits Awards	2026	People's Choice - GL Leading Actress	Freen Sarocha	Nominated	
The Viral Hits Awards	2026	People’s Choice - Leading Actress of the Year	Freen Sarocha	Pending	
Tpop Stage	2022	OST of the Week (week 1)	"Whisper" (week 67/2022)	Won	
Tpop Stage	2023	OST of the Week (week 1)	"Order from my heart" (week 1/2023)	Won	
Tpop Stage	2024	OST of the Week (week 2)	"Cheevee" (week 44/2024)	Won	
Tpop Stage	2025	Rookie of the week (week 1)	Girlfreen (week 12/2026)	Won	
Tpop Stage	2025	Rookie of the week (week 2)	Girlfreen (week 13/2026)	Won	
Tpop Stage	2025	Rookie of the week (week 4)	Girlfreen (week 15/2026)	Won	
Tpop Stage	2026	Ost of the Week (week 1)	All For You (week 21/2026)	Won	
Tpop Stage	2026	Popular of the Week (week 4)	All For You (week 24/2026)	Won	
Y Universe Awards	2024	The Best Series OST	"Pink Theory"	Won	
Y Universe Awards	2024	The Best Couple Awards	(with Becky Armstrong)	Won	
Y Universe Awards	2024	Y Iconic Star	Freen Sarocha	Nominated	
Y Universe Awards	2026	The Best Coming Soon	Cranium	Won	
Y Entertain Awards	2024	Y Couple of the Year	(with Becky Armstrong)	Won	
Y Entertain Awards	2024	Leading Girls' Love Star of the Year	Freen Sarocha	Nominated	
Y Entertain Awards	2024	Princess of Girls' Love	Freen Sarocha	Nominated	
Y Entertain Awards	2024	Best GL Series of the Year	The Loyal Pin	Nominated	
Y Entertain Awards	2024	Best Scene of the Year	The Loyal Pin	Won	
Y Entertain Awards	2025	Y Couple of the Year	(with Becky Armstrong)	Won	
Y Entertain Awards	2025	Princess of Girls' Love	Freen Sarocha	Nominated	
Zoomdara Awards	2025	The Hottest Couple of the Year	(with Becky Armstrong)	Nominated	

=== Listicles ===
Name of publisher, year listed, name of listicle, and placement
Publisher	Year	Listicle	Placement	Ref.
Miss Teen Thailand	2016	Miss Swizer Superfood	15th	
Women in Cinema (France)	2024	One of six honorees for the year 2024	Inducted	
The Business of Fashion 500	2025	BOF 500 - Class of 2025	Inducted	
