= Wild =

Wild, wild, wilds or wild may refer to:

== Common meanings ==
- Wilderness, a wild natural environment
- Wildlife, an undomesticated organism
- Wildness, the quality of being wild or untamed

== Art, media and entertainment ==
=== Film and television ===
- Wild (2014 film), a 2014 American film from the 2012 book
- Wild (2016 film), a 2016 German film
- The Wild, a 2006 Disney 3D animation film
- Wild (TV series), a 2006 American documentary television series
- The Wilds (TV series), a 2020 television series

=== Literature ===
- Wild: From Lost to Found on the Pacific Crest Trail a 2012 non-fiction book by Cheryl Strayed
- Wild, An elemental Journey, a 2006 autobiographical book by Jay Griffiths
- The Wild (novel), a 1991 novel by Whitley Strieber
- The Wild, a science fiction novel by David Zindell
- The Wilds, a 1998 limited-edition horror novel by Richard Laymon

=== Music ===
- Wild (band), a five-piece classical female group

==== Albums and EPs ====
- Wild (Troye Sivan EP), a 2015 EP by Troye Sivan
- Wild (Katseye EP), a 2026 EP by Katseye
- Wild, a 2013 EP by Nine Muses
- Wild, a 1999 album by Inkubus Sukkubus
- Wild, a 2016 album by Joanne Shaw Taylor
- Wild!, a 1989 album by Erasure
- Wild!!, a 2004 album by Terry Silverlight
- The Wild (Raekwon album), 2017
- The Wild (The Rural Alberta Advantage album), 2017

==== Songs and singles ====
- "Wild" (Beach House song), 2012
- "Wild" (Jessie J song), 2013
- "Wild" (Namie Amuro song), 2009
- "Wild" (Troye Sivan song), 2015
- "Wild", a 2025 song by Babymonster from their EP We Go Up
- "Wild", a 2000 song by Poe on her album Haunted
- "Wild", a 2020 single by John Legend (feat. Gary Clark Jr.) from his album Bigger Love
- "Wild", a 2018 song by Trevor Daniel from his EP Homesick
- "The Wild", a song by Mumford & Sons from their 2018 album Delta

==== Concerts and tours ====
- The Wild Tour, 1995–1997 Red Hot Chili Peppers concert tour
- Walk In Lay Down (WILD), a biannual concert event at Washington University in St. Louis

=== Video games ===
- Wild (video game), a cancelled video game
- Rollercoaster Tycoon 3: Wild!, a video game expansion pack

== Organizations ==
- Wild (food company), German food company
- Wild (entertainment company), Singaporean entertainment company and agency
- Wild Heerbrugg, a Swiss company that makes optical instruments
- The Wilds Christian Association, a Protestant Christian organization in South Carolina

== Places ==
- Wild (river), a small stream in Germany and The Netherlands
- Wild Center, a natural history center in Tupper Lake, New York
- Wild Lake, a lake near Idrija in western Slovenia
- The Wilds (Johannesburg), a municipal park in Johannesburg, South Africa
- The Wilds (Ohio), a wildlife conservation center in Muskingum County, Ohio

== Radio stations ==
- WILD (AM), an AM station in the Boston radio market
- WILD-FM, the former callsign of an FM station in the Boston radio market, now WZRM
- WiLD 94.9 (KYLD), an FM station in San Francisco
- WLLD, a station in Tampa–St. Petersburg branded WiLD 94.1
- DXWT, popularly known as Wild FM, a radio station in the Philippines

== Other uses ==
- Wild (surname), various people with the name
- Minnesota Wild, a National Hockey League team
- Wake Induced Lucid Dream, the move from a normal waking state into a dream state with no apparent lapse in consciousness
- Wheel Impact Load Detector, a type of railway defect detection device
- Wenatchee Wild, a major junior ice hockey club in the Western Hockey League

== See also ==
- Comet Wild
- Willd., a botanical author abbreviation
- Wield, a civil parish in Hampshire, England
- Feral child, a human child who has lived isolated from human contact from a very young age
- Wilde (disambiguation)
- Wyld (disambiguation)
- Weld (disambiguation)
- Wylde (disambiguation)
