= Wylde =

Wylde:

- Wylde Green
- Wylde Green railway station

== See also ==
- Wilde
- Wyld (disambiguation)
- Wild (disambiguation)
