= Weld =

Weld may refer to:

- Welding, a metalworking technique
- Weld (name), and persons with the name
- Port Weld, now Kuala Sepetang, Perak, Malaysia
- Weld, Maine, United States
- Weld County, Colorado, United States
- Weld (album), 1991, by Neil Young & Crazy Horse
- Weld (dye), an intense yellow dye made from Reseda luteola
- Weld (band), Norwegian rock group
- The Weld, a mixed-use development in Raleigh, North Carolina

== See also ==
- WELD (disambiguation)
- Wield
- Wild (disambiguation)
