= Wyld =

Wyld or WYLD may refer to:

== People ==
- Carlos Wyld Ospina (1891–1956), Guatemalan novelist, essayist and poet
- Evie Wyld (born 1980), English author
- Harry Wyld (1900–1976), British track cyclist
- Helen Wyld, British museum curator
- Henry Cecil Kennedy Wyld (1870–1945), English lexicographer and philologist
- James Hart Wyld (1913–1953), American engineer and rocketry scientist
- K. A. Ren Wyld (fl. 2020s), formerly known as Karen Wyld, Australian author
- Lew Wyld (1905–1974), British track cyclist
- Percy Wyld (1907–1972), British track cyclist
- William Wyld (1806–1889), British artist

== Radio stations ==
- WYLD (AM), a radio station (940 AM) licensed to New Orleans, Louisiana, US
- WYLD-FM, a radio station (98.5 FM) licensed to New Orleans, Louisiana, US

== Other uses ==
- Wyld (crater), a lunar crater
- Wyld (World of Darkness), a fictional entity
- Wyld diagrams, in fluid mechanics

== See also ==
- Wild (disambiguation)
- Wyld's Great Globe, an attraction of Victorian London
- Wylde (disambiguation)
