= WELD =

WELD may refer to:

- WELD (AM), a radio station broadcasting at 690 kHz on the AM band, licensed to Fisher, West Virginia
- WELD-FM, a radio station broadcasting at 101.7 MHz on the FM band, licensed to Moorefield, West Virginia
- WELD (Ohio), a radio station broadcasting at 97.1 MHz on the FM band, licensed to Columbus, Ohio, which held this call sign from 1943 until its deletion in 1953

== See also ==
- Weld (disambiguation)
