= Freen Sarocha =

Thai actress, singer, model, and entrepreneur (born 1998)

Sarocha Chankimha
- สโรชา จันทร์กิมฮะ
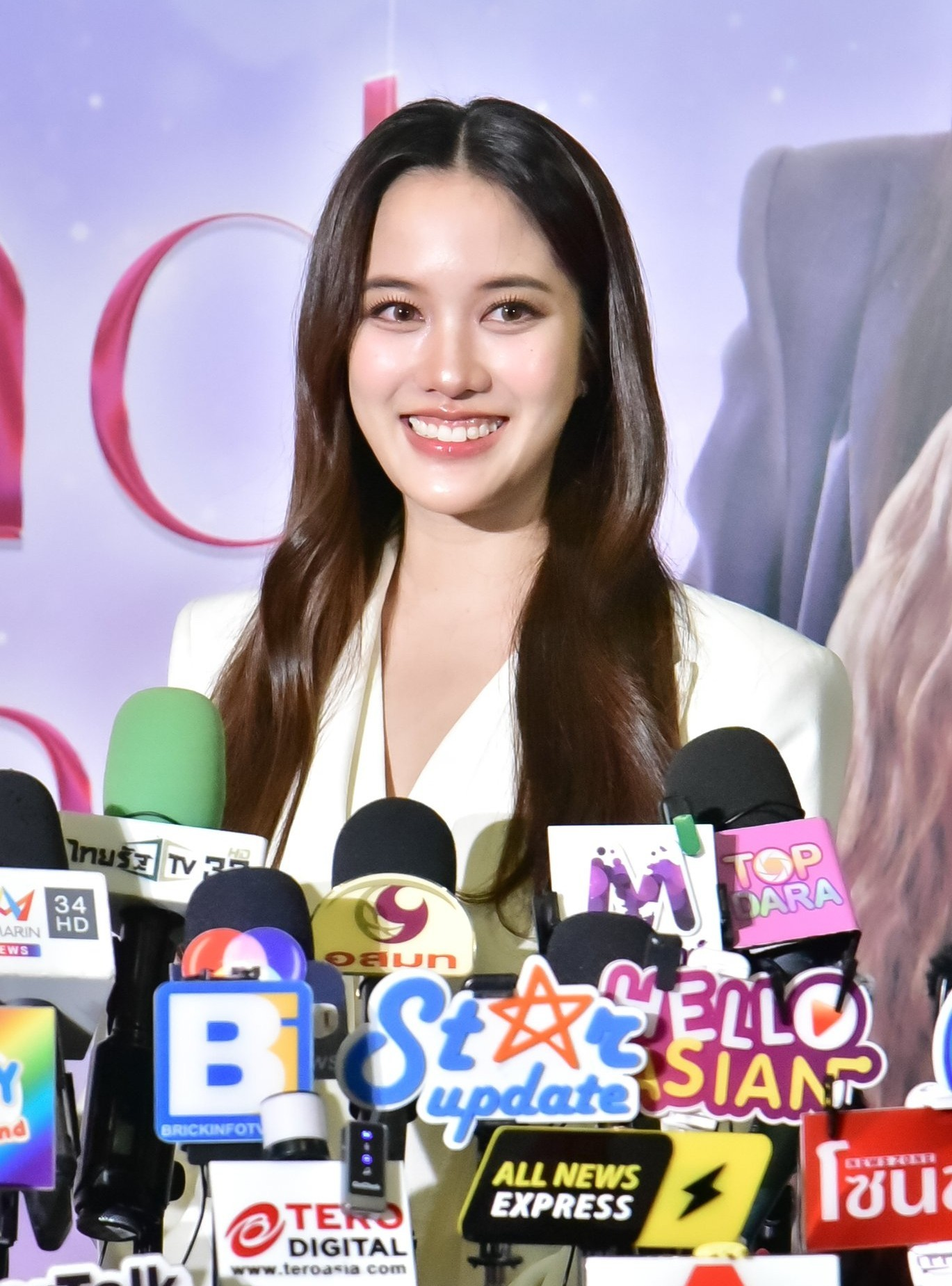
- Sarocha Chankimha (Freen) at the 4 Elements Grand Unveiling, January 2026
- Born: Sarocha Chankimha; 8 August 1998 (age 28); Bangkok, Thailand
- Other names: Freen, Freen Sarocha
- Education: Rangsit University
- Occupations: Actress; Singer; Model; Entrepreneur
- Years active: 2016–present
- Agents: Idol Factory (2020–2025); The Venture Management (2024-present); Solenn Entertainment (2025–present)
- Notable work: Sam in Gap; Pin in The Loyal Pin; Linlada in Uranus 2324; Namsai in The Stain; Lom in The Air
- Height: 167 cm (5 ft 5 1/2 in)

Sarocha Chankimha (Thai: สโรชา จันทร์กิมฮะ; born 8 August 1998), nicknamed Freen (Thai: ฟรีน), is a Thai actress, singer, model, and entrepreneur. She is best known for her lead role as Sam in Gap (2022). Her subsequent works include the science fiction film, Uranus 2324 (2024), and the period drama The Loyal Pin (2024).

In January 2025, she became the first female Thai ambassador for Italian luxury fashion house Valentino. She was the first Thai actress to attend the Met Gala in May 2025, and was inducted into The Business of Fashion BOF 500 in October of the same year.

In 2026, she appeared in all 4 Elements series, a Thai Girls' Love mega-project broadcast in prime time on Channel 7HD, starring as the lead of The Air.

== Early life and education ==
Sarocha was born on 8 August 1998 in Bangkok, Thailand. She completed her secondary education at La Salle School, and went on to study Public Relations and Corporate Communication at the College of Communication Arts at Rangsit University on an academic merit scholarship. In parallel to her studies, she ran an online clothing store on Instagram, and worked multiple jobs to help support her family: blogging, advertising, runway and photography modelling, as well as music video appearances. Sarocha graduated with first-class honours; the degree ceremony was held on 23 January 2022.

== Career ==
In 2016, Sarocha competed in Miss Teen Thailand. She stated that a relative entered her in the contest, and that she took part because she wanted to go to Chiang Mai. Sarocha made the round of 15, and was the recipient of the Miss Swizer Superfood award, (Note: The Thai name of the award is ตำแหน่งหุ่นสวยสุขภาพดี (tamnaeng hun suai sukkhaphap di), meaning beautiful figure, good health. It was one of ten sponsor awards presented at the contest's press round on 29 January 2017.) which came with 30,000 baht in prize money.

=== Acting ===
==== Early work (2016–2022) ====
Sarocha made her first appearance in the entertainment industry in May 2017, starring in the music video "Before Rain" by Thai singer The Toys. In 2020, she signed with the talent agency Idol Factory. The following year, she made her acting debut with a lead role in the romantic comedy series So Fit, which premiered on 25 February 2021. She then joined the cast of Secret Crush on You, a romantic comedy produced by Idol Factory that premiered on Channel 3 HD (Thailand) on 11 February 2022.

==== Breakthrough: Gap: The Series (2022–23) ====
Later that same year, Sarocha starred as Khun Sam in the television series Gap opposite Becky Armstrong in Thailand's first Girls' Love series to be broadcast on national television. The series accumulated more than 900 million views on YouTube. She and Armstrong became known as "FreenBecky". Sarocha also contributed songs to the series' soundtrack, including "Whisper".

==== Diversification (2024–25) ====
In January 2024, Sarocha signed with The Venture Management, a boutique talent consultancy founded in 2023 by Nichapat Suphap.

In May 2024, Sarocha attended the 77th Cannes Film Festival as a "Women in Cinema" honoree, invited by the Red Sea International Film Festival (RSIFF). She participated in the Variety Global Conversations / RSIFF Women in Cinema panel, during which she spoke about the international reach of Thai Girls' Love drama. She was featured on the digital cover of the European edition of Vanity Fair as part of its "Six Women in Cinema" feature.

In 2024, Sarocha and Armstrong co-starred in two productions, filmed concurrently. The first, Uranus 2324, Thailand's first Girls' Love science fiction film, was produced by VelCurve Studio and directed by James Thanadol. Released on 4 July 2024, it topped the Thai domestic box office on opening day, grossing more than 2 million baht in Bangkok and Chiang Mai. The second, The Loyal Pin, a period drama series produced by Idol Factory, premiered on Workpoint TV on 4 August 2024. Sarocha played Lady Pilanthita Kasidit (known as Khun Pin), an orphan noblewoman raised by her aunt within the royal household in 1950s Thailand who develops a close bond with the mischievous Princess Anilaphat Sawetawarit. After eight months of filming, Sarocha called the project the most demanding of her career to date. She described Khun Pin's personality as completely at odds with her own, requiring significant time and effort to fully portray. The cast noted that the period-specific royal vocabulary was challenging to master.

Also in 2024, Sarocha appeared in the horror-comedy Rider alongside Mario Maurer. Produced by Sahamongkolfilm International and directed by Nitivat Cholvanichsiri, it was released on 10 December 2024.

==== Independent career and Solenn Entertainment (2025–present) ====
In October 2025, Sarocha's contract with Idol Factory concluded, after which she established her own management company, Solenn Entertainment, and began operating as an independent artist.

Starting in January 2026, Sarocha appeared in the Thai Girls' Love mega-project 4 Elements, produced by North Star Entertainment. Adapted from a series of novels by Thai author Salmon (Thai: แซลม่อน), the project is composed of four series of eight episodes, each starring a different lead couple. The stories are connected through the Wathinwanit cousins, each named after one of the four elements, who appear in all series. Sarocha plays Vayo Wathinwanit, nicknamed Lom, a police officer. She appears as a recurring guest star in The Earth, The Water and The Fire, and stars as the lead in The Air (Thai TV Series), alongside Armstrong, in their fourth project together.

In February 2026, Sarocha co-starred as Namsai in psychological romantic thriller The Stain (Thai: ราคี) alongside Engfa Waraha, Nattawin Wattanagitiphat and Jespipat Tilapornputt. Produced by Be On Cloud, the film is a modern take on the classic Thai horror film Buppah Rahtree. It was released in Thai cinemas on 26 February 2026.

=== Fashion and modelling ===
Following her early modelling days while still in college, and following the success of Gap, Sarocha pursued her interest in fashion further, both on her own and alongside Armstrong. Starting in 2024, she has worked with multiple luxury brands for fashion features, campaigns and magazine covers. She also regularly promotes local Thai brands through events and campaigns, such as Lamotte, House of Little Bunny, and sustainable brand Pipatchara, among others.

In January 2025, Italian luxury fashion house Valentino announced her appointment as their first Thai female Brand Ambassador.

In November 2025, Sarocha was selected by ICONSIAM as their Nang Noppamas of the Year for the Loy Krathong Festival. As part of that honour, she led a showcase of Thai royal traditional dresses in a Thai Chakraphat designed by Dr. Surat Jongda.

==== Fashion work with Armstrong ====
Sarocha and Armstrong were the recipients of a 'Men of the Year 2023' award from GQ Thailand as 'Nation's Trending Stars', and were featured as one of the four covers of the magazine in December 2023, wearing Emilio Pucci. In January 2024, they were the cover stars of Vogue Thailand and in May 2024, covered Harper's Bazaar's Singapore. In December 2025, they were featured on the cover of Vogue Hong Kong, shot by BJ Pascual, both solo and together.

==== Solo fashion work ====
Sarocha has been featured on the cover of multiple fashion magazines in Thailand, Hong Kong, Singapore, Malaysia and Taiwan.

In January 2024, Sarocha was featured on the cover of L'Officiel Thailand. In July 2024, she covered Harper's Bazaar Thailand, wearing Saint Laurent. In December 2024, she was featured on the cover of Hong Kong magazine #legend.

In March 2025, she was featured on the covers of GRAZIA Singapore and GRAZIA Malaysia, shot by Mark Kawin, wearing Valentino.

In August 2025, Sarocha was featured for the second time on the cover of Vogue Thailand, this time on her own.

In June 2026, she worked with photographer Mark Kawin once more for the 357th edition of Vogue Taiwan. Titled 'Notes from Bangkok', the editorial was shot at Praya Palazzo in Bangkok.

==== International Red Carpet events ====
On 18 May 2024, Sarocha and Armstrong walked the red carpet for the 77th Cannes Film Festival premiere of Emilia Pérez. Sarocha wore a custom Eman AlAjlan tulle gown and Chopard jewellery for the occasion.

On 5 May 2025, she was the first Thai actress to attend the Metropolitan Museum of Art's annual Met Gala in New York City, wearing a custom creation by Michele with Valentino Garavani accessories. According to Launchmetrics' annual Red Carpet Power Rankings, published by The Hollywood Reporter, she generated $19.5 million in Media Impact Value (MIV), placing her second overall among all attendees after fellow Thai and Blackpink member Lisa (rapper), helping Valentino rank second among brands present. The Business of Fashion noted that Sarocha's custom looks "sparked discussions about “retro-futurism” and “dark romanticism”" on TikTok, and highlighted that her debut "was a resounding success for Valentino, underscoring a fashion brand's ability to amplify rising global talent."

In October 2025, she was included in The Business of Fashion's BOF 500 list and subsequently attended the BOF 500 Gala on 4 October 2025, wearing a custom Valentino dress.

==== Fashion Weeks ====
In September 2024, Sarocha attended her first Paris Fashion Week show, which saw new Valentino creative director Alessandro Michele debut his first collection, Pavillon des Folies Spring/Summer 2025, for the Maison. According to Launchmetrics, Sarocha ranked fourth among all celebrities at the event, generating an estimated $5.9 million in Media Impact Value (MIV) from 4 placements.

In 2025, Sarocha attended two Valentino shows in Paris: the Fall/Winter 2025 Ready-to-wear collection presentation on 9 March, and the Womenswear Spring/Summer 2026 show on 5 October.

In January 2026, Sarocha made her Haute Couture Week debut, attending the Valentino Haute Couture Spring/Summer 2026 show, Specula Mundi, in Paris.

== Filmography ==
=== Film ===
| Year | Title | Role | Notes | Ref. |
|---|---|---|---|---|
| 2024 | Uranus 2324 | Lin (Linlada Sasinpimon) | Main role | |
| 2024 | Rider | Pie | Main role | |
| 2026 | Rakhi (The Stain) | Namsai | Main role | |

=== Television series ===
| Year | Title | Role | Notes | Ref. |
|---|---|---|---|---|
| 2021 | So Fit | Bing | Main role | |
| 2022 | Secret Crush on You | Khongkwan | Supporting role | |
| 2022 | Gap The Series | M.L. Samanan "Sam" Anantrakul | Main role | |
| 2023 | The Sign | Wansarat | Guest | |
| 2024 | The Loyal Pin | Lady Pilanthita "Pin" Kasidit | Main role | |
| 2024 | Duangjai Taewaprom: Porncheewan | Jane | Guest (EP.12) | |
| 2026 | 4 Elements: The Earth | Lieutenant Vayo "Lom" Wathinwanit | Supporting role | |
| 2026 | 4 Elements: The Water | Lieutenant Vayo "Lom" Wathinwanit | Supporting role | |
| 2026 | 4 Elements: The Air | Lieutenant Vayo "Lom" Wathinwanit | Main role | |
| 2026 | 4 Elements: The Fire | Lieutenant Vayo "Lom" Wathinwanit | Guest | |
| 2026 | Jet Lag 2 | Ayi | Guest (EP.21) | |
| 2027 | The Witch of Siam † | Irene | Main role | |
| TBA | Cranium † | Dr. Phinya "Phin" Thananon | Main role | |

Key
| † | Denotes films that have not yet been released |

=== Music videos ===
| Year | Song title | Artist | Notes | Ref. |
|---|---|---|---|---|
| 2017 | "Before Rain" (ก่อนฤดูฝน) | The Toys | | |
| 2018 | "Goodbye" | Singto Numchok | | |
| 2020 | "นิสัยรวย" | Nicky & Goyyog Ft. P-HOT | | |
| 2022 | "Pink Theory" (ทฤษฎีรักนี้สีชมพู) | with Becky Armstrong | From Gap OST | |
| 2023 | "Marry Me" | with Becky Armstrong | From Gap OST | |
| 2023 | "Balloon" (ผิดที่ฉันกอดเธอไม่แน่นพอ) | Playground | | |
| 2023 | "No More Blues" | with Becky Armstrong | From Gap OST | |
| 2024 | "Rain" (ติดฝน) | with KnomJean | Cover song (original song by PiXXiE) | |
| 2024 | "Awkward" (มองหน้ากันไม่ติด) | with Becky Armstrong | Oat Pramote Pathan Feat. Maiyarap | |
| 2024 | "Cheevee" (ชีวี) | with Becky Armstrong | From The Loyal Pin OST | |
| 2025 | "Melt" (ละลาย) | with Becky Armstrong | Cover song (original song: Lalalye by Four-Mod) | |
| 2026 | "All For You" (หมดชีวิต) | | From The Air OST | |
| 2026 | "Flashback" (จำได้ว่าลืม) | William Jakrapatr | Member of LYKN | |

== Discography ==
| Year | Song title | Artist | Notes | Ref. |
|---|---|---|---|---|
| 2022 | "ลูกอม" (Candy) | with Becky Armstrong | Cover song (original song: ลูกอม - วัชราวลี WhatChaRaWaLee) | |
| 2022 | "เอาปากกามาวง" (Give Me A Pen) | with Becky Armstrong | Cover song English version (original song: เอาปากกามาวง - Bell Warisara) | |
| 2022 | "Pink Theory" (ทฤษฎีรักนี้สีชมพู) | with Becky Armstrong | From Gap OST | |
| 2022 | "คำสั่งจากหัวใจ" (Orders From The Heart) | | From Gap OST | |
| 2022 | "Whisper" (กระซิบ) | | From Gap OST | |
| 2022 | "Pink Theory" (ทฤษฎีรักนี้สีชมพู) (Bossa Ver.) | with Becky Armstrong | From Gap OST | |
| 2023 | "No More Blues" | with Becky Armstrong | From Gap OST | |
| 2023 | "Marry Me" | with Becky Armstrong | From Gap OST | |
| 2024 | ติดฝน (rain) | with Knomjean (ขนมจีน) | Cover song (original song by PiXXiE) | |
| 2024 | "Cheevee" (ชีวี) | with Becky Armstrong | From The Loyal Pin OST | |
| 2025 | "Girlfreen" | | Official audio released on YouTube and music streaming services on 17 March 2025. | |
| 2025 | "Melt" (ละลาย) | with Becky Armstrong | Cover song (original song: ละลาย by Four-Mod) | |
| 2025 | "SOLO" | | Cover song (original song: Solo by Jennie) | |
| 2025 | "FIRE BOY" | with Becky Armstrong | Cover song (original song: Fire Boy by PP Krit) | |
| 2025 | "ยังเป็นดอกไม้ของเธอ...หรือเปล่า" (Flower) | | Cover song (original song: ยังเป็นดอกไม้ของเธอ...หรือเปล่า (Flower) by Faye Fang Kaew) | |
| 2025 | "เพลงรัก" | with Becky Armstrong | Cover song (original song: เพลงรัก by All KamiKaze) | |
| 2025 | "Me Too" | with Natthaphat Tantisathianchai, Fay Kunyaphat and Justin Jamy | Cover song (original song: Me Too by 3.2.1 KamiKaze) | |
| 2026 | "หมดชีวิต (All For You)" | | From The Air OST | |

== Concerts/Events ==
| Year | Day/month | Name | City | Country | Location | Ref. |
|---|---|---|---|---|---|---|
| 2022 | 19 November | Gap Yuri World Premier | Bangkok | Thailand | Major Cineplex Ratchayothin | |
| 2023 | 10 February | Gap: The Debutante | Bangkok | Thailand | Siam Pavalai Royal Grand Theatre | |
| 2023 | 12 February | Gap: The Debutante | Manila | Philippines | SM North EDSA Sky Dome | |
| 2023 | 26 March | FreenBecky FaBulous FanBoom | Bangkok | Thailand | Thunder Dome | |
| 2023 | 9 April | FreenBecky FaBulous FanBoom | Macao | China | Broadway Theatre | |
| 2023 | 21 April | FreenBecky FaBulous FanBoom | Cebu | Philippines | Waterfront Cebu City Hotel & Casino | |
| 2023 | 23 April | FreenBecky FaBulous FanBoom | Manila | Philippines | New Frontier Theater | |
| 2023 | 24 April | FreenBecky Aromagicare Fan Sign Launch | Manila | Philippines | New Frontier Theater | |
| 2023 | 4 July | FreenBecky Grand Fan Meeting by Aromagicare | Manila | Philippines | Araneta Coliseum / Big Dome | |
| 2023 | 22 July | FreenBecky FaBulous FanBoom | Hong Kong | China | AsiaWorld Expo Runway 11 / Hall 11 | |
| 2023 | 30 July | FreenBecky FaBulous FanBoom | Macao | China | Broadway Theatre | |
| 2023 | 13 - 14 August | Sarocha Solo Stage Birthday Fan Meeting | Bangkok | Thailand | Indoor Stadium HuaMark | |
| 2023 | 7 October | FreenBecky Fan Meeting | Chiba | Japan | Ichikawa City Cultural Hall | |
| 2023 | 25 November | FreenBecky 1st Fan Meeting | Taipei | Taiwan | NTU Sports Center 1F | |
| 2024 | 12 January | FreenBecky 1st Fan Meeting | Capitol Singapore | Singapore | Capitol Theatre | |
| 2024 | 30 March | FreenBecky 1st Fan Meeting | Ben Thanh Theater | Vietnam | Ho Chi Minh City | |
| 2024 | 27 April | FreenBecky 2024 Fan Meeting | Manila | Philippines | New Frontier Theatre | |
| 2024 | 6 - 7 July | Uranus2324 Fancon live in Bangkok | Bangkok | Thailand | MCC Hall lifestore The mall Ngamwongwan | |
| 2024 | 28 July | The Loyal Pin Gala Premiere | Bangkok | Thailand | MCC Hall The Mall LifeStore Ngamwongwan | |
| 2024 | 17 August | Sarocha Solo Stage Birthday Fan Meeting: The Freenairy Oracle | Bangkok | Thailand | Thunder Dome | |
| 2024 | 13 October | The Loyal Pin Lantern Night | Bangkok | Thailand | MCC Hall The Mall LifeStore Bangkhae | |
| 2024 | 16 November | PROXIE The 2nd Concert "The Final Fantasy" [Guest] | Bangkok | Thailand | IMPACT Arena, Muang Thong Thani | |
| 2024 | 17 November | The Loyal Pin Final Episode | Bangkok | Thailand | Siam Pavalai Royal Grand Theatre | |
| 2024 | 23 November | The Loyal Pin Final Episode | Macau | China | The Venetian L3 Ballroom | |
| 2024 | 22 December | Rider: Girlfreen Screening | Bangkok | Thailand | Siam Pavalai Theatre, Siam Paragon | |
| 2025 | 12 January | Idol Factory Has Unveiled The Lineup Projects For 2025 | Bangkok | Thailand | Siam Pavalai Royal Grand Theatre | |
| 2025 | 9 February | The Royal Coronation: FreenBecky Fan Meeting | Manila | Philippines | New Frontier Theater | |
| 2025 | 2 March | Idol Factory Girl's Day | Saitama | Japan | Sonic City Large Wall | |
| 2025 | 3 March | Idol Factory Girl's Day | Osaka | Japan | Osaka International House Foundation | |
| 2025 | 15 March | FreenBecky Real Bond | Macau | China | Lisboata Macau H853 Entertainment Place | |
| 2025 | 30 March | "Love Overload" Freenbecky 1st Fanmeeting | Bangkok | Thailand | Idea Live, Bravo BKK | |
| 2025 | 20 April | Gap Reunion Final Episode | Bangkok | Thailand | Siam Pavalai Theatre, Siam Paragon | |
| 2025 | 25 April | 4 Elements: The Global Phenomenon of Girl Love | Bangkok | Thailand | River Park at Iconsiam | |
| 2025 | 21 June | FreenBecky: Unbreakable Connection in Vietnam | Vietnam | Ho Chi Minh City | Hoa Binh District 10 Cultural Center | |
| 2025 | 29 June | FreenBecky: Love Aboard in Taipei | Taipei | Taiwan | Legacy Tera Taipei | |
| 2025 | 9 August | INFREENNITY | Bangkok | Thailand | Phenix Grand Ballroom, 5th floor | |
| 2025 | 30 August | Freenbecky 1st Fan Meeting [Love Spreads] | São Paulo | Brazil | Vibra São Paulo | |
| 2025 | 1 September | Freenbecky 1st Fan Meeting [Love Spreads] | Mexico City | Mexico | Teatro Metropolitan | |
| 2025 | 3 September | Freenbecky 1st Fan Meeting [Love Spreads] | Lima | Peru | Auditorio del Pentagonito, San Borja | |
| 2025 | 20 September | FREEN's First Fan Meeting | Nanning | China | Star Hall Haoyouyuan Center Nanning Guangxi | |
| 2025 | 11 October | "HAPPY TIME" Idol Factory Fanmeeting | Osaka | Japan | Sky Theater MBS (Osaka) | |
| 2025 | 20 December | EnjoyJune' J-land 1st Journey - Jewel' Fan [Guest] | Bangkok | Thailand | Union Hall, Union Mall | |
| 2026 | 11 January | 4 Elements: The Grand Unveiling | Bangkok | Thailand | Union Hall, Union Mall | |
| 2026 | 17 January | Freen's First Fansign | Tianjin | China | | |
| 2026 | 8 February | Girlfreen - Love Letter Solo Fanmeeting | Taipei | Taiwan | NCCU Arts & Culture Center | |
| 2026 | 28 March | Freen’s Fansign Event | Shanghai | China | | |
| 2026 | 30 May | Freen Fan Meeting in Vietnam - One Fine Day | Ho Chi Minh City | Vietnam | Ben Thanh Theatre | |
| 2026 | 8 August | Room Number Freen Concert | Bangkok | Thailand | Thunder Dome | |
| 2026 | 12 September | 4 Elements Infinite Bonds Fan Meeting | Bangkok | Thailand | Union Hall, Union Mall | |
| 2026 | 24 October | Freen’s Fan Signing Event | China | China | | |
| 2026 | 3 November | Freen Latin America Tour: Velvet Dream "Twilight" | Mexico City | Mexico | Aauditorio BB | |
| 2026 | 5 November | Freen Latin America Tour: Velvet Dream "Hush" | Lima | Peru | Pentagonito Auditorium | |
| 2026 | 7 November | Freen Latin America Tour: Velvet Dream "Lucid" | São Paulo | Brazil | Teatro Renault | |
| 2026 | 8 November | Freen Latin America Tour: Velvet Dream "Dawn" | Santiago | Chile | Teatro La Cupula | |

== Ambassadorship ==
| Year | Period | Brand | Position | Notes | Ref |
|---|---|---|---|---|---|
| 2021 | 2021–present | IN2IT | Brand Presenter | | |
| 2023 | 2023 | Mi-NE COCOA | Brand Presenter | with Becky Armstrong | |
| 2023 | 2023 | Aromagicare | Brand Ambassador | with Becky Armstrong | |
| 2024 | 2024 | Cutepress | Brand Presenter | | |
| 2025 | 2025–present | Valentino | Brand Ambassador | | |
| 2025 | 2025–present | Central World | Brand ambassador | with Becky Armstrong | |
| 2025 | 2025–present | Central Pattana | Brand Ambassador | with Becky Armstrong | |
| 2025 | 2025 | Charlotte Tilbury | Friend of Charlotte Tilbury; Pillow Talk Cushion Brand Ambassador | | |
| 2026 | 2026–present | Time Phoria | Brand Ambassador | | |
| 2026 | 2026–present | Elemis | Friend of Elemis Thailand | | |

== Accolades ==
=== Awards and nominations ===
| Won | 106 |
| Nominated | 57 |
| Total Nominations | 163 |

*Few private voting based recognitions are not mentioned here.

| Year | Award | Category | Nominated work | Result | Ref. |
|---|---|---|---|---|---|
| 2016 | Miss Teen Thailand 2016 | Miss Swizer Superfood | | Won | |
| 2022 | Tpop Stage | OST of the Week (week 1) | "Whisper" (week 67/2022) | Won | |
| 2023 | Tpop Stage | OST of the Week (week 1) | "Order from my heart" (week 1/2023) | Won | |
| 2023 | Mellow Pop | Top Viral Idol Chart March 2023 | Gap The Series (with Becky Armstrong) | Won | |
| 2023 | Kazz Awards 2023 | Saowaisai 2022 (3rd place) | | Won | |
| 2023 | Kazz Awards 2023 | Series of the Year | Gap The Series | Won | |
| 2023 | Kazz Awards 2023 | Popular Female Teenage Award | | Won | |
| 2023 | Kazz Awards 2023 | Couple of the Year | (with Becky Armstrong) | Won | |
| 2023 | Maya TV Awards | Song of the Year Award | "Pink Theory" | Nominated | |
| 2023 | Maya TV Awards | Female Rising Star of the Year | | Won | |
| 2023 | Maya TV Awards | Couple of the Year | (with Becky Armstrong) | Won | |
| 2023 | Nine Entertain Awards | People's Choice | (with Becky Armstrong) | Won | |
| 2023 | Nakarat Awards | People's Choice | (with Becky Armstrong) | Nominated | |
| 2023 | Nakarat Awards | Rising star of the Year | | Nominated | |
| 2023 | SEC Awards 2023 (Brazil) | Favorite Couple in a Series | Gap The Series (with Becky Armstrong) | Won | |
| 2023 | SEC Awards 2023 (Brazil) | Best Asian Series | Gap The Series | Won | |
| 2023 | Feed Y Capital Awards 2023 | Most Popular Couple | (with Becky Armstrong) | Won | |
| 2023 | Feed Y Capital Awards 2023 | Popular Series | Gap The Series | Won | |
| 2023 | Howe Awards 2023 | The Best Couple Award | (with Becky Armstrong) | Won | |
| 2023 | Howe Awards 2023 | Hottest Series | Gap The Series | Won | |
| 2023 | Thai Update Awards 2023 | The Best TV Series | Gap The Series | Won | |
| 2023 | Thai Update Awards 2023 | The Most Favorite Young Female Star Group A | | Won | |
| 2023 | Superstar Maya Awards 2023 | Superstar Maya Idol Female | | Won | |
| 2023 | Superstar Maya Awards 2023 | Superstar Maya Idol Couple | (with Becky Armstrong) | Nominated | |
| 2023 | Y Universe Awards 2023 | The Best Series OST | "Pink Theory" | Won | |
| 2023 | Y Universe Awards 2023 | The Best Couple Awards 2023 | (with Becky Armstrong) | Won | |
| 2023 | Y Universe Awards 2023 | Y Iconic Star | | Nominated | |
| 2023 | BreakTudo Awards 2023 (Brazil) | Fictional Ship | MonSam: Gap The Series | Won | |
| 2023 | GQ Men of The Year 2023 (Thailand) | Nation's Trending Stars | (with Becky Armstrong) | Won | |
| 2024 | Lesbocine 2024 | Top Best Kiss | Gap The Series | Won | |
| 2024 | Sanook Top of the Year Awards 2023 | The Best Couple Award | (with Becky Armstrong) | Won | |
| 2024 | Sanook Top of the Year Awards 2023 | Female Rising Star | | Won | |
| 2024 | Sanook Top of the Year Awards 2023 | The Best Series of the Year | Gap The Series | Won | |
| 2024 | Japan Expo Thailand Award 2024 | Japan Expo Actors Award | (with Becky Armstrong) | Won | |
| 2024 | BIC Seven Awards 2024 (Brazil) | LGBTQ+ Spotlight | Gap The Series (with Becky Armstrong) | Won | |
| 2024 | 12th Thailand Social Awards | Best Creator Performance on Social Media - Actor & Actress | | 2nd place | |
| 2024 | 12th Thailand Social Awards | Best Content Performance on Social Media (Thai Series) | Gap The Series | 2nd place | |
| 2024 | Kazz Awards 2024 | Couple of the Year | (with Becky Armstrong) | Won | |
| 2024 | Kazz Awards 2024 | Popular Vote | | Won | |
| 2024 | Women in Cinema (France) | One of six honorees for the year 2024 | Hosted by Red Sea International Film Festival (RedSeaIFF) and Vanity Fair Europe in conjunction with the 77th Cannes Film Festival | Won | |
| 2024 | 20th Kom Chad Luek Awards | Best Couple of the Year | (with Becky Armstrong) | Won | |
| 2024 | 20th Kom Chad Luek Awards | Most Popular Actress | | Won | |
| 2024 | Nine Entertain Awards | Couple of the Year | (with Becky Armstrong) | Won | |
| 2024 | Nine Entertain Awards | People's Choice | | Nominated | |
| 2024 | EFM Fandom Awards | Sissss of the Year | (with Becky Armstrong) | Won | |
| 2024 | Mint Awards 2024 | Best Cover of the Year | | Won | |
| 2024 | Mint Awards 2024 | Best Digital Cover of the Year | (with Becky Armstrong) | Won | |
| 2024 | Feed Y Capital Awards 2024 | Most Popular Couple | (with Becky Armstrong) | Won | |
| 2024 | Maya TV Awards 2024 | Charming Female of the Year | | Nominated | |
| 2024 | Maya TV Awards 2024 | Popular Award | | Won | |
| 2024 | Maya TV Awards 2024 | Couple of the Year | (with Becky Armstrong) | Won | |
| 2024 | Howe Awards 2024 | Popular Awards | | Nominated | |
| 2024 | Tpop Stage | OST of the Week (week 1) | "Cheevee" (week 43/2024) | Nominated | |
| 2024 | Tpop Stage | OST of the Week (week 2) | "Cheevee" (week 44/2024) | Won | |
| 2024 | Tpop Stage | OST of the Week (week 3) | "Cheevee" (week 45/2024) | Nominated | |
| 2024 | Tpop Stage | OST of the Week (week 4) | "Cheevee" (week 46/2024) | Nominated | |
| 2024 | Thai Update Awards 2024 | The Most Favorite On-Screen Couple of 2024 | (with Becky Armstrong) | Won | |
| 2024 | Thai Update Awards 2024 | Popular Star Awards | | Won | |
| 2024 | 2024 Thailand Headlines Person of the Year Awards (China) | The Most Popular on-screen Couple of the Year Award | Gap The Series (with Becky Armstrong) | Won | |
| 2024 | BreakTudo Awards 2024 (Brazil) | International Fandom of the Year | (with Becky Armstrong) | Won | |
| 2024 | BreakTudo Awards 2024 (Brazil) | Fictional Ship | AnilPin: The Loyal Pin | Won | |
| 2024 | Dailynews Awards 2024 | Couple of the Year | (with Becky Armstrong) | Won | |
| 2024 | Y Entertain Awards 2024 | Y Couple of the Year | (with Becky Armstrong) | Won | |
| 2024 | Y Entertain Awards 2024 | Leading Girls' Love Star of the Year | | Nominated | |
| 2024 | Y Entertain Awards 2024 | Princess of Girls' Love | | Nominated | |
| 2024 | Y Entertain Awards 2024 | Best GL Series of the Year | The Loyal Pin | Nominated | |
| 2024 | Y Entertain Awards 2024 | Best Scene of the Year | The Loyal Pin | Won | |
| 2024 | Lesbocine 2024 | Biggest Couple of 2024 | The Loyal Pin | Won | |
| 2025 | Sanook Top of the Year Awards 2024 | Best Couple of the year | (with Becky Armstrong) | Won | |
| 2025 | Sanook Top of the Year Awards 2024 | The Best Series of the Year | The Loyal Pin | Won | |
| 2025 | HUB Awards 2024 | Couple of the Year | (with Becky Armstrong) | Won | |
| 2025 | HUB Awards 2024 | Chemistry of the Year | (with Becky Armstrong) | Won | |
| 2025 | HUB Awards 2024 | Actress of the Year | | Won | |
| 2025 | HUB Awards 2024 | Main Couple of the Year | (with Becky Armstrong) | Won | |
| 2025 | HUB Awards 2024 | Kiss Scene of the Year | The Loyal Pin | Won | |
| 2025 | HUB Awards 2024 | Dramatic Scene of the Year | The Loyal Pin | Won | |
| 2025 | HUB Awards 2024 | Opening of the Year | The Loyal Pin | Won | |
| 2025 | 13th Thailand Social Awards | Best Creator Performance on Social Media - (Actor & Actress) | | 2nd place | |
| 2025 | 13th Thailand Social Awards | Best Content Performance on Social Media - (Movie) | Uranus 2324 | 2nd place | |
| 2025 | 13th Thailand Social Awards | Best Content Performance on Social Media - (Series) | The Loyal Pin | Won | |
| 2025 | Thailand Box Office Movies & Series Awards 2024 | Best Couple of the Year | (with Becky Armstrong) | Nominated | |
| 2025 | Thailand Box Office Movies & Series Awards 2024 | Actress Series of the Year | The Loyal Pin | Nominated | |
| 2025 | Thailand Box Office Movies & Series Awards 2024 | Series of the Year (GL) | The Loyal Pin | Nominated | |
| 2025 | Thailand Box Office Movies & Series Awards 2024 | Movies of the Year | Uranus 2324 | Nominated | |
| 2025 | Thailand Box Office Movies & Series Awards 2024 | Actress Movie of the Year | Uranus 2324 | Nominated | |
| 2025 | Mellow Pop | Best Couple of the Month 2024 | (with Becky Armstrong) | Won | |
| 2025 | Zoomdara Awards 2025 | The Hottest Couple of the Year [Female] | (with Becky Armstrong) | Nominated | |
| 2025 | Madame Mount Awards 2025 | Couple of the Year | (with Becky Armstrong) | Nominated | |
| 2025 | Superstar Idol Awards 2025 | Superstar Best Actress | | Nominated | |
| 2025 | Superstar Idol Awards 2025 | Best [Y] Actress | | Nominated | |
| 2025 | Superstar Idol Awards 2025 | Superstar Female Couple | (with Becky Armstrong) | Nominated | |
| 2025 | Superstar Idol Awards 2025 | Best [Y] Original Soundtrack | "Cheevee" | Won | |
| 2025 | The Viral Hits Awards 2024 | Most Popular Yuri Series of the Year Award | Gap The Series | Nominated | |
| 2025 | The Viral Hits Awards 2024 | Most Popular Yuri Series of the Year Award | The Loyal Pin | Nominated | |
| 2025 | The Viral Hits Awards 2024 | Best Yuri Series Couple of the Year Award | (with Becky Armstrong) | Nominated | |
| 2025 | Tpop Stage | Rookie of the week (week 1) | Girlfreen (week 12/2026) | Won | |
| 2025 | Tpop Stage | Rookie of the week (week 2) | Girlfreen (week 13/2026) | Won | |
| 2025 | Tpop Stage | Rookie of the week (week 3) | Girlfreen (week 14/2026) | Nominated | |
| 2025 | Tpop Stage | Rookie of the week (week 4) | Girlfreen (week 15/2026) | Won | |
| 2025 | Kom Chad Luek Awards 2025 | Popular Actress | | Nominated | |
| 2025 | Kom Chad Luek Awards 2025 | Popular Couple | (with Becky Armstrong) | Won | |
| 2025 | Nine Entertain Awards 2025 | Couple of the Year | (with Becky Armstrong) | Won | |
| 2025 | Nine Entertain Awards 2025 | People's Choice | | Nominated | |
| 2025 | Kazz Awards 2025 | Series of The Year | The Loyal Pin | Won | |
| 2025 | Kazz Awards 2025 | Couple of the Year 2025 | (with Becky Armstrong) | Won | |
| 2025 | Kazz Awards 2025 | Popular Female Teenage Award 2025 | | Won | |
| 2025 | Kazz Awards 2025 | Superstar Award 2025 | | Won | |
| 2025 | Bangkok Pride Awards 2025 | Pride Popular of Series / Drama | The Loyal Pin | Nominated | |
| 2025 | Bangkok Pride Awards 2025 | Pride Popular of Sapphic Series Star | (with Becky Armstrong) | Nominated | |
| 2025 | Thailand Moral Awards 2024 | Honorable Mention - Film | Uranus 2324 | Won | |
| 2025 | Thailand Y Content Awards 2024 | Best series | The Loyal Pin | Nominated | |
| 2025 | Thailand Y Content Awards 2024 | Best Leading Actress | | Nominated | |
| 2025 | Thailand Y Content Awards 2024 | Couple of the Year | (with Becky Armstrong) | Won | |
| 2025 | Thailand Y Content Awards 2024 | People's Choice Award | | Nominated | |
| 2025 | SEC Awards 2025 (Brazil) | Favorite Couple | AnilPin: The Loyal Pin | Won | |
| 2025 | SEC Awards 2025 (Brazil) | Asian Series Performance | The Loyal Pin | Won | |
| 2025 | Lesbocine 2025 | Iconic Sapphic | Gap The Series | Won | |
| 2025 | Mint Awards 2025 | Best Digital Cover of the Year - December 2024 | (with Becky Armstrong) | Won | |
| 2025 | FEED X KHAOSOD Awards 2025 | Best Chemistry | (with Becky Armstrong) | Nominated | |
| 2025 | FEED X KHAOSOD Awards 2025 | Popular Drama Series | The Loyal Pin | Nominated | |
| 2025 | FEED X KHAOSOD Awards 2025 | Top-Tier GL Series of the Year | The Loyal Pin | Nominated | |
| 2025 | FEED X KHAOSOD Awards 2025 | Girls' Love Actress of the Year | | Nominated | |
| 2025 | FEED X KHAOSOD Awards 2025 | Couple of the Year | | Nominated | |
| 2025 | 33rd Suphannahong National Film Awards 2025 | Popular Movie | Uranus 2324 | Won | |
| 2025 | 33rd Suphannahong National Film Awards 2025 | Popular Movie | Rider | Nominated | |
| 2025 | Y Entertain Awards 2025 | Y Couple of the Year | (with Becky Armstrong) | Won | |
| 2025 | Y Entertain Awards 2025 | Princess of Girls' Love | | Nominated | |
| 2025 | The Business of Fashion 500 | BOF 500 - Class of 2025 | (with Becky Armstrong) | Won | |
| 2025 | Maya TV Awards 2025 | Charming Female of the Year | | Nominated | |
| 2025 | Maya TV Awards 2025 | Popular Vote | | Nominated | |
| 2025 | Maya TV Awards 2025 | Female Couple of the Year | (with Becky Armstrong) | Won | |
| 2025 | Howe Awards 2025 | Howe Hottest Actress Award | | Nominated | |
| 2025 | Howe Awards 2025 | Hottest The Best Couple Award | (with Becky Armstrong) | Nominated | |
| 2025 | Howe Awards 2025 | Howe Hottest Series Award | The Loyal Pin | Nominated | |
| 2025 | Howe Awards 2025 | The 50 Influential People 2025 | | Won | |
| 2025 | BreakTudo Awards 2025 (Brazil) | International Fandom of the Year | (with Becky Armstrong) | Won | |
| 2025 | BreakTudo Awards 2025 (Brazil) | Crush International | | Won | |
| 2025 | Harper’s Bazaar Women of the Year | Breakthrough | | Won | |
| 2026 | Y Universe Awards 2025 | The Best Coming Soon | Cranium | Won | |
| 2026 | Thairath Awards 2025 | Female Couple of the Year | (with Becky Armstrong) | Won | |
| 2026 | Thairath Awards 2025 | Most Popular Celebrity of the Year | | Won | |
| 2026 | The Viral Hits Awards 2025 | Best Yuri Couple Of The Year | (with Becky Armstrong) | Nominated | |
| 2026 | Nine Entertain Awards 2026 | Couple of the Year | (with Becky Armstrong) | Won | |
| 2026 | Nine Entertain Awards 2026 | People's Choice | | Nominated | |
| 2026 | Superstar Idol Awards 2026 | Idol of the Year | | Won | |
| 2026 | Superstar Idol Awards 2026 | Popular Female Couple of the Year | (with Becky Armstrong) | Nominated | |
| 2026 | HUB Awards 2025 | Most Anticipated Premiere | 4 Elements | Won | |
| 2026 | Kazz Awards 2026 | Hottest Film Award | Rakhi (The Stain) | Won | |
| 2026 | Kazz Awards 2026 | The Best Actress Of The Year | | Won | |
| 2026 | Kazz Awards 2026 | Couple Of The Year | (with Becky Armstrong) | Won | |
| 2026 | Bangkok Pride Awards | Pride Popular of Movie | Uranus 2324 | Won | |
| 2026 | T-pop Stage | Ost of the Week (week 1) | All For You (week 21/2026) | Won | |
| 2026 | T-pop Stage | Ost of the Week (week 2) | All For You (week 22/2026) | Nominated | |
| 2026 | T-pop Stage | Ost of the Week (week 3) | All For You (week 23/2026) | Nominated | |
| 2026 | T-pop Stage | Ost of the Week (week 4) | All For You (week 24/2026) | Nominated | |
| 2026 | T-pop Stage | Popular of the Week (week 4) | All For You (week 24/2026) | Won | |
| 2026 | SEC Awards 2026 (Brazil) | International Crush of the Year | | Won | |
| 2026 | The Viral Hits Awards 2026 | GL Leading Actress - People's Choice Award | | Nominated | |
| 2026 | Hashtag Legend Thailand | 100 List Social Club 2026 - Super Stars | | Won | |
| 2026 | FEED X KHAOSOD Awards 2026 | Popular Drama Awards | The Air | Nominated | |
| 2026 | Maya TV Awards 2026 | Charming Woman of the year | | Nominated | |
| 2026 | Maya TV Awards 2026 | Female Couple of the year | (with Becky Armstrong) | Won | |
| 2026 | Maya TV Awards 2026 | Popular vote of the year | | Nominated | |
| 2026 | BreakTudo Awards 2026 | International Fandom of the Year | (with Becky Armstrong) | Pending | |
| 2026 | BreakTudo Awards 2026 | GL Series of the Year | The Air | Pending | |
| 2026 | BreakTudo Awards 2026 | International Crush | | Pending | |
| 2026 | The Viral Hits Awards 2026 | People’s Choice - Leading Actress of the Year | | Pending | |

=== Listicles ===
| Year | Publisher | Listicle | Placement | Ref. |
|---|---|---|---|---|
| 2023 | TC Candler | The 100 Most Beautiful Faces of 2023 | 98th place | |
| 2024 | Lefty.io | Top Influencers of Cannes | 6th place | |
| 2024 | TC Candler | The 100 Most Beautiful Faces of 2024 | 46th place | |
| 2024 | Lefty.io | The Top Brands of PFW SS25 | 11th place | |
| 2025 | Lefty.io | The Definitive List of 2024 Top Fashion Influencers | 10th place | |
| 2025 | Lefty.io | The Top Influencers of Paris Fashion Week AW25 | 6th place | |
| 2025 | Favikon | Top 20 Fashion Influencers in 2025 | 12th place | |
| 2025 | Lefty.io | A Global View of Fandom | 2nd place | |
| 2025 | Lefty.io | Top Key Voice by Met Gala Top influencers | 4th place | |
| 2025 | POP X | Most mentioned celebrities on Twitter during the Met Gala | 5th place | |
| 2025 | Brandwatch | Most mentioned celebrities online at the Met Gala | 2nd place | |
| 2025 | Lefty.io | The Top 15 Celebrities at the 2025 Met Gala | 7th place | |
| 2025 | Wearisma | Top 15 Met Gala 2025 Brands By Earned Media Value | 3rd place | |
| 2025 | POP Core | Top Fashion Brands at the Met Gala 2025 | 4th place | |
| 2025 | The Hollywood Reporter | Top 10 Fashion Brands at the Met Gala | 2nd place | |
| 2025 | POP Core | Top 5 Women at the Met Gala | 2nd place | |
| 2025 | BOF | Top 10 Celebrities mentioned in Met Gala | 10th place | |
| 2025 | Lefty.io | The Top 5 Thai Stars by EMV at 2025 Fashion Weeks | 4th place | |
| 2025 | Lefty.io | The Top 5 Thai Stars by EMV at 2025 Fashion Weeks | 4th place | |
| 2025 | Onclusive | Top Mentioned Female kpop artist during PFW on social media. | 8th place | |
| 2025 | Pop Core | Top Fashion Houses and Celebrities Mentioned on X during SS26 | 2nd place | |
| 2025 | Favikon | Top 20 Influencers in Thailand in 2026 | 7th place | |
| 2025 | TC Candler | The 100 Most Beautiful Faces of 2025 | 42nd place | |
| 2026 | Launchmetrics | Top Voices by MIV for Valentino - Haute Couture 2026 | 2nd place | |
| 2026 | Launchmetrics | Top Placement by MIV for Valentino - Haute Couture 2026 | 1st place | |
| 2026 | Launchmetrics | Top Influencer by MIV for Valentino at Haute Couture 2026 & FW 26/27 | 2nd place | |
| 2026 | SOA star | The Most Influential Asian Artist | 3rd place | |
| 2026 | Thai Updates | New Thai Dramas and Series Pairings That Fans Are Excited For | 2nd place | |
