= Girl from Nowhere: The Reset =

Thai mystery thriller television series

- Promotional poster
- เด็กใหม่ The Reset
- Genre: Mystery; Thriller
- Starring: Becky Armstrong
- Country of origin: Thailand
- Original language: Thai
- No. of seasons: 1
- No. of episodes: 6

Production
- Production companies: The One Enterprise; SOUR Bangkok; GINGERx; Parbdee Taweesuk

Original release
- Network: ONE31 (cut version) *oneD app and Netflix (uncut version)
- Release: 7 March 2026 – present

Related
- Girl from Nowhere

Girl from Nowhere: The Reset (Thai: เด็กใหม่ The Reset) is a Thai mystery thriller television series created by studio SOUR Bangkok. It serves as a reboot and a reimagining of the original Girl from Nowhere franchise. The series stars Becky Armstrong as the lead character, Nanno. It premiered on 7 March 2026 on the One31 TV Channel (cut version), the OneD app, and globally on Netflix (uncut version). It broke the record for the Top Thai series by number of 67 Countries/Regions in the Netflix Top 10. Becky Armstrong won the "Rising Star Award" at the 2026 Korea International Streaming Festival (KISF) Global OTT Awards in Korea for her performance as "Nanno" in Girl From Nowhere: The Reset.

== Premise ==
The series centers on Nanno, a mysterious girl who transfers to various private schools in Thailand. She works to reveal lies, hidden truths, and moral failures committed by students and staff members. Girl from Nowhere: The Reset is not a continuation of the previous seasons but is a standalone story set in a new universe. The new version of Nanno does not know the characters from the earlier seasons. The promotional tagline for the series is, "When evil strikes every day, Nanno must return."

== Cast ==
=== Main ===
- Becky Armstrong as Nanno.

A mysterious high school girl, possesses a enigmatic personality whose identity and origins remain unknown. She consistently transfers to a new school and is a new student everywhere she goes. Each school she visits brings a different story, filled with enigmatic powers and origins. She acts as both a guide and a punisher for humans who conceal secrets or commit acts without considering the consequences. She takes over the role from Chicha Amatayakul, who portrayed Nanno in the first two seasons.

=== Supporting ===
- "Sam" Prudtichai Ruayfupant as Sky

A male student who is severely bullied by Jomphol and wants revenge on him by finding Nanno to help resolve his situation. However, Sky is the only one who can track down Nanno and knows her every move in various events. His motives remain a mystery. (Appearing from episode 1)

== Production ==
The series is produced by the studio SOUR Bangkok. The original Girl from Nowhere series aired its first season in 2018 and its second season in 2021. The franchise gained popularity in Thailand and other countries such as Vietnam and the Philippines.

On 12 January 2026, the official social media pages for the show released a teaser image. This image showed the new lead actress from behind, wearing the character's signature school uniform. The caption on the teaser hinted at a "new student" and a "new universe." The identity of the new lead actress was officially revealed on 14 January 2026. The official teaser was released on January 19, 2026 on YouTube, X, Instagram, and TikTok.

== Release ==
Girl from Nowhere: The Reset premiered on 7 March 2026 and aired on Channel One 31. An uncut version of the show was released on the oneD streaming application, It was also released on Netflix globally that same day.

== Reception ==
After an acclaimed gala premiere, the following episodes received mixed reactions from the public and critics alike, who had high expectations. Those attached to the original imagery of the show's first run continue to expect it to become darker, even though the series itself has moved to prime time and lowered its age rating to 15+ to reach a new, more global audience. While this resulted in mixed reviews from long-standing fans, the series was fully embraced by a new generation of younger fans, extending its international reach. #GFNTR became the biggest debut for a Thai show in Netflix history, becoming the most-watched Thai series on Netflix globally, hitting the top 10 in 67 countries and regions.

Despite the pressure on the show's new lead actress, Becky Armstrong, she was praised by casual viewers and specialist critics alike for her fresh interpretation of the character. Her portrayal of Nanno is considered well-crafted, capturing the sarcasm and issues of this new generation. Visually, the show received mixed reviews, but its artistic use of angles, symmetry, details and transitions was widely praised. Critics and the public mostly criticised the length of the episodes, the director's unclear vision and editing, but the writers' room received the most criticism. Confusing storylines and weak dialogue undermined the talents of the cast, both newcomers and veterans, causing both the public and critics to lament the squandering of potential in terms of both the cast and the themes.

== Viewership ==
In the table below, the blue number represents the lowest ratings and the red number represents the highest TV and streaming ratings.

=== Girl from Nowhere: The Reset ===
Episode	Original release date	Timeslot	Average audience share								Ref.
Episode	Original release date	Timeslot	Nationwide All 15+	Bangkok	BU	BU + BKK (15+)	Rural	Netflix (TH)	Netflix (Global)	OneD App	Ref.
1	07 March 2026	20:30	0.754	0.556	0.773	0.683	0.797	1	5	2	
2	14 March 2026	20:30	0.810	0.969	1.203	1.107	0.631	1	5	2	
3	21 March 2026	20:30	0.639	1.252	0.717	0.938	0.458	1	10	5	
4	28 March 2026	20:30	0.711	0.589	1.057	0.864	0.618	2	10	4	
5	04 April 2026	20:30	1.072	0.385	1.159	0.840	1.212	2	10	4	
6	18 April 2026	20:30	0.606	0.655	1.235	0.996	0.370	5	10	10	
Average			0.766	0.766	1.033	0.9	0.683	2	10	4	

== Awards and nominations ==
Year	Award	Category	Nominee	Nominated work	Result	Ref.
2026	2026 Asia Contents Awards & Global OTT Awards	Best New Female Actress	Becky Armstrong	Nanno in Girl From Nowhere: The Reset	Nominated	
2026	2026 Asia Contents Awards & Global OTT Awards	People's Choice Award (Female Actor)	Becky Armstrong	Nanno in Girl From Nowhere: The Reset	Nominated	
2026	2026 Asia Contents Awards & Global OTT Awards	Rising Star of the Year	Becky Armstrong	Nanno in Girl From Nowhere: The Reset	Won	

== Episodes ==
Season	Episodes	Originally released		
Season	Episodes	First released	Last released	Network
1	6	March 7, 2026	April 18, 2026	ONE31 oneD App and Netflix (Uncut version)

No. in season	Title	Directed by	Original release date
1	"Sky"	Pairach Khumwan	March 7, 2026
Bullies ruthlessly torment Sky at school. When his attempt at revenge backfires, Nanno intervenes and shifts the balance of power. Guest stars: Prudtichai Ruayfupant (Sky), Nuttawat Thanathaveepraserth (Jom), Suparak Sangkarit (Oddy), Porramat La-dee (Mike), Gandhi Wasuwitchayagit (Jom's father), Paradorn Vesurai (Headmaster), Marian Poom-on (Teacher), Phanawan Nasik (Jom's sister)
2	"Panty"	Sitisiri Mongkholsiri	March 14, 2026
Nanno joins a girls' volleyball team that is targeted by voyeurs. When the school fails to act, she pushes her teammates to protect themselves. Guest stars: Kantapon Jindataweephol (Peck), "Perth" Veerinsara Tangkit Suwanich (Mook), Ratchanee Boonyatharokul (Headmaster), Kanthee Limpitikranon (Markkaw), Akkarapat Neeyapan (Doi), Nawapron Kamluan (Da), Sumyi Wong (Jew), Prudtichai Ruayfupant (Sky)
3	"Hater"	Patha Thongpan	March 21, 2026
Jealous of a classmate's online fame, a student launches a viral takedown. But his scheme quickly spirals when Nanno hits back with an opposing hashtag. Guest stars: Punnavich Sirikiatvanit (Hongtae), Alexander Buckland (Jamie), Prudtichai Ruayfupant (Sky), Pranee Meechamnan (Hongtae's mom)
4	"Only Nanno"	Sivaroj Kongsakul	March 28, 2026
An influencer's bold self-image sparks a rivalry with Nanno. As the showdown escalates, the cost of pleasing a demanding fandom unveils a dark reality. Guest stars: Methika Jiranorraphat (Blossom), Piya Sastrawaha (Headmaster), Prachapon Thepsukdee (Suea), Prudtichai Ruayfupant (Sky)
5	"Corrupt Lies"	Eakasit Thairaat	April 4, 2026
A school begins to crumble under the weight of corruption and neglect. As fear and scandal take hold, Nanno gains leverage over the unfolding crisis. Guest stars: Saharat Thiempan (Pankam)
6	"Election"	Waasuthep Ketpetch	April 18, 2026
One student's principled campaign falters against Nanno's crowd-pleasing tactics, leaving him to question if ideals are really worth more than victory. Guest stars: Pisitpol Ekaphongpisit (Paradorn), Teeradech Vitheepanich (New)
