= Wilde (disambiguation) =

Wilde is a surname.

Wilde may also refer to:

== Places ==
- Wilde, Buenos Aires, a city in Argentina
- Wilde (Eder), a tributary of the Eder in Hesse, Germany
- Wilda, Poznań or Wilde, a district of Poland
- Wilde Lake, Columbia, Maryland, a reservoir and the surrounding neighborhood
- Wilde River, a river in Massachusetts and Rhode Island

== Other uses ==
- Wilde Baridón (1941–1965), Uruguayan cyclist
- Wilde Gomes da Silva (born 1981), Brazilian futsal player
- Wilde baronets, an extinct title in the Baronetage of England
- Wilde (film), a film about Oscar Wilde

== See also ==
- Wilde Professor of Mental Philosophy, a professorship at the University of Oxford
- De Wilde., a botanical author abbreviation for Émile Auguste Joseph De Wildeman
- Wild (disambiguation)
