= Uranus 2324 =

2023 Thai historical mystery-drama film

- Theatrical release poster
- Thai: ยูเรนัส 2324
- Directed by: James Thanadol
- Produced by: Keetawat Chinnakote
- Starring: Sarocha Chankimha; Rebecca Patricia Armstrong
- Cinematography: Nut Nualpang; Titipong Chaisati; Thanadol Nualsuth
- Edited by: Velcurve Motion Post; Wasupol Sripuk
- Music by: Ekkaphop Khiaoyasit; Teerraphong Prathumrat
- Production companies: Velcurve Co.,LTD
- Distributed by: Netflix; Amazon Prime Video
- Release date: July 4, 2024
- Running time: 130 minutes
- Country: Thailand
- Languages: Thai; English

Uranus 2324 is a 2024 Thai science fiction romantic drama film directed by James Thanadol and produced by Keetawat Chinnakote. The film stars Sarocha Chankimha and Rebecca Patricia Armstrong, popularly known as the pairing "FreenBecky". The story explores themes of love, identity, and destiny against a futuristic backdrop. It was released in Thailand on July 4, 2024, with a runtime of 130 minutes.

Uranus 2324 was screened at international festivals, including the Toronto Independent Film Festival of Cift, and received several nominations at the 13th Thailand Social Awards, the Thailand Box Office Movies & Series Awards 2024, and the Thailand Y Content Awards 2024. It has been considered the first Thai space film. The film was praised for its innovations, visuals, and practical effects, and critics highlighted the performances by Armstrong and Chankimha.

== Synopsis ==
The story revolves around two childhood friends, an astronaut and a free diver, who try to reconnect in spite of their unfortunate parting.

== Cast ==
=== Main ===
- Sarocha Chankimha as "Lin" Linlada Sasinpimon
  - Usha Seamkhum as Lin (old)
- Rebecca Patricia Armstrong as Kath

=== Supporting ===
- Torfan Taweema as Friend / Prim
- Sirium Pukdeedumrongrit as Rose (Kath's mother)
- Amarin Nitibhon as Yut (Kath's father)
- Ninnart Sinchai as Phat (Lin's father)
- Christopher Gerber as Astronaut Thomas Weston
- Ken Yashiro as Ken Miyamoto
- So Takei as Japanese soldier

=== Guest ===
- Erich Fleshman as Nick Nelson [Administrator of NASA]

== Production ==
The film Uranus 2324 held an unveiling ceremony on August 20, 2023 fully announcing the project and its ambitions and supporters while launch its trailer pilot (which gain millions of views and social media talk). Including funds to build a spaceship and a virtual space station. The space station was inspired by NASA's Lunar Gateway space station. The film is one of four Thai films from 2023-24 productions, to be chosen by Thai Royal Government to receive a budget, to make a film to promote Thailand's soft power from the Ministry of Culture. And one of the few Thai projects in film/series to be fully approved by the Thai department fiscal year 2024.

September and October 2023 were mark by several workshops for the main actors focus on acting, stunts, free-diving, english scientific language and more; with the first Qs of shooting the movie starting on 30 November 2023 in New York City, NY and later, after a several shooting across Thailand, they finished shooting all big scenes (heavily post production ones) on studio in Bangkok on 17 March 2024, with the producers announcing that the movie production progress was at 80%, after that, both actresses returned to shooting individual scenes and to the sound booth to improve some sound capture while the team worked on post-production, Freen Sarocha and Becky Armstrong officially resumed filming at the beginning of June 2024. Produce by Velcurve in collaboration with GM Generates, and big sponsors, the movie hit theaters on July 4, 2024.

== Distribution/Reception ==
The film Uranus 2324 started its distribution at many film festivals and entertainment content events participating in the Asian Contents & Film Market 2023 (ACFM) and 28th Busan International Film Festival (BIFF) in Busan, South Korea, and TIFFCOM 2023 and 36th Tokyo International Film Festival (2023) in Tokyo, Japan.

The film received positive responses from fans, investors and critics alike. Attention from foreign film industries ensured rights sales and distribution deals in more than 27 countries around the world. These deals included the streaming giants Netflix and Amazon Prime Video. After its run in theaters the film would be shared across Asia, Europe, and Latin America.

The movie Uranus 2324 was part of the Thai Nights for Cannes 2024 and premiered its first official poster both at Cannes and Hong Kong Filmart 2024. The Royal Thai Embassy in partnership with UP Film Institute organized the Thai Film Festival 2024 in celebration of the 75th anniversary of the diplomatic relations between the Kingdom of Thailand and the Philippines and had Uranus 2324 as one of the main attractions of the festival.

The full trailer was released on of June 16, 2024. Less than an hour after releasing, the hashtag #URANUS2324OfficialTrailer immediately became a popular trend in Thailand. It trended in more than 20 countries around the world.

Later the official Gala Premiere Uranus 2324 event took social media and the mall by storm. With thousand of fans, Thai and international, in loco, the gala event stop the mall by the amount of people trafficking the event area, the special black carpet lead by Freen Sarocha and Rebecca Armstrong, also count with many Thai stars appearances and the full cast and main crew and executives highlights. The event was also honored by Mrs. Yutika Isarankul Na Ayutthaya, Deputy Permanent Secretary of the Ministry of Culture, as a special guest at the Uranus 2324 Movie Premiere Gala. Zom Marie also made a special performance of "Still Missing You" on the main soundtrack for the movie.

After its premiere July 4, the movie climbed to top 5 biggest box office in its first weekend at Thai cinemas and continued being screened at international festivals. The movie was released in international theaters simultaneously with the Thai premiere. Laos screened the film on July 4, marking the start of its international run. From there, it reached audiences in over 18 countries, making a general run or limited time screening due to local partnerships with companies like Rafaella Films and Cinemark.

After an almost five-month run in theaters worldwide, December 2024 marked its debut on streaming, starting with Netflix Asia. In 2025, the movie arrived on MyMovies One (an Italian platform), and in the US and Europe via Amazon Prime, later its availability was expanded to Latin America, breaking into the top 10 across streaming platforms.

== Original soundtrack ==
No.	Title	Lyrics	Artist	Length
1.	"Still Missing You" (Thai: ล้านปีแสง)	Achariya Dulyapaiboon	Zom Marie	5:27
2.	"If I Could"	Dena Euprasert	Dena Euprasert	4:42
3.	"Sparkles"	Dena Euprasert	Dena Euprasert	4:09

== Ratings/Scores ==
Year	Publisher	Info	Score	Contribuitions (critics + audience)	Added by users	Ref.
2024	IMDb (Internet Movie Database)	An online database of information about movies, TV, music, and games, now owned by Amazon. (global)	6.3	5.6k+	36.2k+	
2024	TMDB (The Movie Database)	It is a community-driven platform that provides a comprehensive database of movies, TV shows, actors, and production crews. (Film niche)	80	untracked	untracked	
2024	MDL (MyDramalist)	It's a community-driven platform where Asian drama and movie fans can create their own lists, discuss their favorite shows and movies, discover new content. (Asian audience and enthusiasts)	7.7	1.5k+	4.5k	

== Accolades ==
=== Awards and nominations ===
Year	Award	Category	Nominated work	Result	Ref.
2024	Toronto Independent Film Festival of Cift	Best Directing in Feature Film	Thanadol Nualsuth	Nominated	
2024	Toronto Independent Film Festival of Cift	Best Script for a Long Feature Film	Thitipong Chaisati & Nut Nualpang	Nominated	
2025	Idol Star Thai Awards Mexico	Best Thai LGBTQ+ Film Production	Uranus 2324	Won	
2025	HUB Awards 2024	Ost of the Year	Sparkles (Dena Euprasert)	Nominated	
2025	13th Thailand Social Awards	Best Creator Performance on Social Media - (Movie)	Uranus 2324	2nd place	
2025	Thailand Box Office Movies & Series Awards 2024	Movies of the Year	Uranus 2324	Nominated	
2025	Thailand Box Office Movies & Series Awards 2024	Director Movie of the Year	James Thanadol	Nominated	
2025	Thailand Box Office Movies & Series Awards 2024	Actress Movie of the Year	Freen Sarocha	Nominated	
2025	Thailand Box Office Movies & Series Awards 2024	Actress Movie of the Year	Becky Armstrong	Nominated	
2025	Thailand Box Office Movies & Series Awards 2024	Supporting Actor Movie of the Year	Amarin Nitibhon	Nominated	
2025	Thailand Box Office Movies & Series Awards 2024	Supporting Actress Movie of the Year	Sirium Pukdeedumrongrit	Nominated	
2025	Thailand Box Office Movies & Series Awards 2024	Original Song Movie of the Year	Still Missing You	Nominated	
2025	Thailand Y Content Awards 2024	Best Film	Uranus 2324	Nominated	
2025	Thailand Moral Awards 2024	Honorable Mention - Film	Uranus 2324	Won	
2025	33rd Suphannahong National Film Awards 2025	Best Visual Effects	Velcurve Studios	Nominated	
2025	33rd Suphannahong National Film Awards 2025	Best Original Song	Still Missing You	Nominated	
2025	33rd Suphannahong National Film Awards 2025	Popular Movie	Uranus 2324	Won	
2026	Bangkok Pride Awards 2026	Pride Popular of Movie	Uranus 2324	Won	

=== Listicles ===
Year	Publisher	List	Nominees	Position	Ref.
2025	Lesbocine	Top Sapphic Characters of 2025	Kath	9th place	
2025	Lesbocine	Top Sapphic Characters of 2025	Lin	13th place	

=== Events ===
Year	Day/Month	Name	City	Country	Location	Ref.
2023	20 August	Project Velcurve 2023 New Space Press Conference	Bangkok	Thailand	Central Court, Central World Shopping Center	
2023	19 November	Uranus2324 Worship Ceremony	Bangkok	Thailand	Lan Hin Avenue, Ratchayothin	
2024	2 July	The Gala Premiere of Uranus2324	Bangkok	Thailand	Infinity Hall Paragon Cineplex on the 5th floor of Siam Paragon Shopping Center	
2024	6-7 July	Uranus2324 FanCon Live in Bangkok	Ngamwongwan	Thailand	MCC Hall The Mall LifeStore Ngamwongwan	
2024	10 July	Special Screening with FreenBecky SFW	Bangkok	Thailand	SF World Cinema, Central World	
2024	10 July	Special Screening with FreenBecky Major Cineplex	Bangkok	Thailand	Siam Pavalai Theatre, Siam Paragon	

== Sponsorships/Partners ==
Company	Function/Activity	Info	Country	Ref.
Velcurve Studios	Main Production Company	Holds the rights to the production and is responsible for the cast, script, crew, and marketing, and its global distribution.	Thailand	
GM Generates	Support Production Company and Distribuitor	Official distributor and licensing agent in Thailand.	Thailand	
C EYE Group	Support Production -Public Company	Full-service Advertising, Photography, Cinematography and production support company.	Thailand	
Ministry of Culture	Main Sponsor - Royal Government	Part of the Thai Royal Government’s effort to promote Thailand’s soft power from the Ministry of Culture.	Thailand	
Tourism Authority of Thailand	Main Sponsor - Royal Government	Part of the Thai Royal Government’s effort to promote Thailand’s tourism through supporting Thai productions that travel across the country and have a global audience.	Thailand	
CP (Charoen Pokphand Group Company)	Official Sponsor - Private Royal Conglomerate	Thai conglomerate based in Bangkok. It is Thailand's largest private company and the largest privately held Royal Warrant holder of the Thai Royal Family.	Thailand	
Udom Thai	Official Sponsor - Sets and Cast/Crew support	New York Based Thai Restaurant.	USA	
Central Pattana	Official Sponsor - Business Conglomerate	One of the biggest companies in Thailand focus on property developer with shopping centers, residences, offices, hotels and strategic investments	Thailand	
NETA auto	Official Sponsor - company owned by Hozon Auto	Chinese electric car manufacturer	China	
Klean & Kare	Official Sponsor - Pharmaceuticals	With over 50 years of experience, it’s a highly respected and award-winning pharmaceutical group offering saline-based products for cleaning and maintaining family hygiene, focusing on sterile solutions that can be used for a variety of benefits.	Thailand	
SONY	Official Sponsor - Sound Engineer	Sony's new sound and camera technology was used to enhance audio capture, and during the editing and post-production process, it helped boost the audience's experience in theaters and later at home with high-quality sound.	Japan	
The Matter	Official Sponsor - Publisher	A news agency specializing in multiple platforms, bringing Thai news to the world and global news to Thailand.	Thailand	
ONE31	Official Sponsor - Network	A TV company that also invests in many productions.	Thailand	
Good Things Happen	Official Sponsor - Marketing	Its a Collaboration Marketing Agency who create customer experiences through touch point integration & customize a campaign to achieve the goal.	Thailand	
