= Wild (entertainment company) =

Singaporean entertainment company

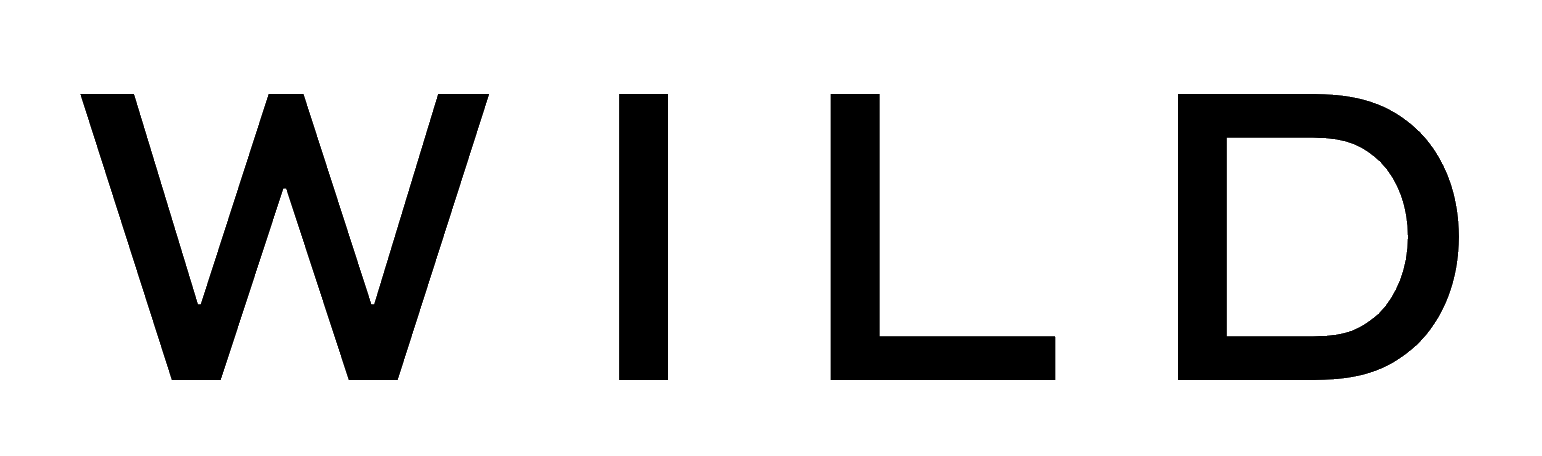
- Trade name: WILD Entertainment Group Pte. Ltd.
- Type: Private
- Industry: Music entertainment; Mass media; Marketing
- Founded: 2020; 6 years ago
- Founder: Leonard Lim
- Headquarters: Singapore
- Key people: Leonard Lim (CEO); Audrey Lim (COO)
- Divisions: Record Label; Creator Management; Marketing
- Website: teamwildent.com

Wild (stylized as WILD) is a global entertainment company that encompasses a record label, creator management agency, and marketing division. Founded in August 2020 by Leonard Lim, it operates with headquarters in Singapore and additional offices in Seoul, South Korea.

Wild represents a variety of creators across different industries, including music, fashion, and digital media.

Wild had signed a distribution deal with The Orchard

== History ==
Wild Entertainment, founded by Leonard Lim in 2020, is a group headquartered in Singapore and Seoul.Founder Leonard Lim was named to Prestige Singapore's 40 Under 40 list in 2026. He was also among the Singapore business figures featured in Portfolio magazine's 2026 industry forecast.

The company operates in three main divisions: an in-house record label. The in-house label is home to several recording artists, while the management arm supports artists, music producers, and digital content creators in navigating global markets. The global agency division manages creators worldwide, aiming to connect them with leading brands for marketing and promotional initiatives.

Since its inception, Wild has signed numerous artists and creators. In May 2021, under Wild Entertainment's representation, Sorn debuted as a solo artist with her single "Run," known for its energetic vibe and positive message. The partnership with Sorn marked a significant step in the agency’s strategy to nurture solo careers and expand its presence in the K-pop industry with the addition of Seungyeon, another former CLC member. The company soon expanded to represent Yubin (former Wonder Girls member) and Korean-American rapper Junoflo, positioning itself as a versatile entertainment agency.

The agency’s expansion extended beyond K-pop to encompass various industries and regions. This was exemplified by the signing of Liza Soberano in 2024, marking her international career transition, and the addition of Tasha Low, a Singaporean K-pop idol and actress. Tasha originally debuted in 2012 with the girl group SKarf. After the group disbanded, she transitioned into acting in 2018 and gained popularity through roles in local dramas and films. Under Wild’s management, Tasha diversified her career and returned to music as a soloist in 2024 with her debut single Everything You Wanted. The song allowed Tasha to showcase a new and independent side of herself, receiving attention for its empowering message and well-produced sound.

In addition to managing musicians, Wild has expanded into managing other prominent personalities.

In March 2026, Wild signed Thai-British actress and singer Becky Armstrong, marking her transition into a recording artist. She released her debut single "Skin" on 1 May 2026 under the label.
