= Comet Wild =

Comet Wild or Wild's Comet may refer to any of the comets below that were discovered by the Swiss astronomer, Paul Wild:

- 63P/Wild 1
- 81P/Wild 2
- 86P/Wild 3
- 116P/Wild 4
- C/1957 U1 (Latyshev–Wild–Burnham)
- C/1967 C2 (Wild)
- C/1968 U1 (Wild)
