= Gap (TV series) =

2022–23 Thai television series

- Promotional poster
- Thai: ทฤษฎีสีชมพู
- Genre: Girls' love; Romantic comedy
- Based on: GAP by Chao Planoy (เจ้าปลาน้อย)
- Written by: Patty Phatphatson Warissaraphuricha
- Directed by: Nuttapong Wongkaveepairoj
- Starring: Sarocha Chankimha; Rebecca Patricia Armstrong
- Opening theme: "Pink Theory" by Pixxie
- Country of origin: Thailand
- Original language: Thai
- No. of seasons: 1
- No. of episodes: 12

Production
- Executive producer: Suppapong Udomkaewkanjana
- Cinematography: Supakit Thawise; Chonkan Tosiri
- Running time: 60 minutes
- Production company: IDOLFACTORY

Original release
- Network: Channel 3; YouTube
- Release: 19 November 2022 – 11 February 2023

Gap (Thai: ทฤษฎีสีชมพู; RTGS: Thritsadi Si Chomphu; lit. Pink Theory) is a Thai romantic comedy television series that premiered on Channel 3 and the IdolFactory channel on YouTube on 19 November 2022, and ran until 11 February 2023. It stars Sarocha Chankimha and Rebecca Patricia Armstrong. Based on the novel of the same name by Chao Planoy (เจ้าปลาน้อย), the series was written by Patty Phatphatson Warissaraphuricha, directed by Nuttapong Wongkaveepairoj, and produced by IdolFactory. It is the first GL series broadcast on Thailand's national television and surpassed 800 million views on YouTube within one year of its release.

The series attracted an international following and earned multiple awards for its two leads, Sarocha "Freen" Chankimha and Rebecca Patricia "Becky" Armstrong, who became known as "FreenBecky".

== Synopsis ==
Ever since Sam (Sarocha Chankimha) came to her aid years ago, Mon (Rebecca Patricia Armstrong) has always considered the former as her role model. When Mon graduates from University, she decides to apply for a job at Sam's company, yet Sam's distant and icy exterior surprises her. The closer Mon gets to Sam, and the more of Sam's barriers she breaks, the more Mon's feelings gradually change from idolizing to love and Sam's world becomes brighter. However, between them lie many obstacles such as gender barriers, the 8-year age gap, company rules, and social class, as Sam is a descendant of royalty.

== Cast ==
=== Main ===
- Freen Sarocha Chankimha as "Sam" Samanan Anantrakul
- Rebecca Patricia Armstrong as "Mon" Kornkamon Phetpailin
- Tassawan Seneewongse as Sam's grandmother
- Asavarid Pinitkanjanapun as Kirk

=== Supporting ===
- Looknam Orntara Poolsak as Jim
- Irin Urassaya Malaiwong as Yuki
- Ratchanon Kanpiang as Nop
- Punnisa Sirisang as Kade
- Noey Natnicha Vorrakittikun as Tee
- Mind Sawaros Nekkham as Neung
- Potida Boomee as Song
- Jirawat Wachirasarunpat as Aon
- Amata Piyavanich as Pohn
- Thongthong Mokjok as Mhee
- Suttatip Wutchaipradit as Noi
- Natsinee Charoensitthisap as Yha
- Chirapathr Pingkanont as Chin

=== Guest ===
- Suppapong Udomkaewkanjana as Phoom
- Amanda Jensen as Nita
- Sulax Siriphattharapong as Cher
- Praiya Padungsuk as Risa
- Patchanon Ounsa-ard as Nuea (Secret Crush On You story)
- BonBon Armstrong as Sua/Singha

== Production ==
Gap was announced as the first mainstream GL series in Thailand. The project was launched on 22 August 2021, along with the main cast confirmation. Casting for supporting roles was held on 13 November 2021.

== Original soundtrack ==
| No. | Title | Artist | Length |
|---|---|---|---|
| 1. | "Pink Theory" (Thai: ทฤษฎีรักนี้สีชมพู) | Sarocha Chankimha; Rebecca Patricia Armstrong | 3:11 |
| 2. | "Whisper" | Sarocha Chankimha | 3:59 |
| 3. | "Because of You" | Pinpin | 3:28 |
| 4. | "Think Alike" (Thai: คิดเหมือนกัน) | Rebecca Patricia Armstrong | 3:08 |
| 5. | "Orders From the Heart" (Thai: คำสั่งจากหัวใจ) | Sarocha Chankimha | 3:21 |
| 6. | "Don't End It Like This" (Thai: อย่าจบกันแบบนี้) | Orntara Poolsak | 4:07 |
| 7. | "Pink Theory (Bossa Ver.)" (Thai: ทฤษฎีรักนี้สีชมพู) | Sarocha Chankimha; Rebecca Patricia Armstrong | 2:56 |
| 8. | "Is This It?" (Thai: นี่น่ะหรือ) | Asavarid Pinitkanjanapun | 3:25 |
| 9. | "Marry Me" | Suppapong Udomkaewkanjana | 3:16 |
| 10. | "This is Enough" (Thai: แค่นี้พอ) | Asavarid Pinitkanjanapun | 4:06 |
| 11. | "I Won't Give Up" (Thai: ฉันไม่ยอมแพ้) | Orntara Poolsak | 4:33 |
| 12. | "No More Blues" | Sarocha Chankimha; Rebecca Patricia Armstrong | 3:20 |
| Total length: | | | 42:50 |

== Reception ==
After the release of the first trailer on 14 May 2022, the series received negative feedback on social media. The production team had to readjust the script and costumes, in addition to making changes to shooting locations, which prompted filming to be postponed until 20 June 2022. Filming finally wrapped up on 22 October 2022.

Following the success of Gap, another production company called NineStarStudios, adopted the novel's spinoff Blank into another GL series called Blank: The Series, which continues to follow a new version of Nueng (Sam's oldest sister) and includes new versions of Sam, Mon and other familiar characters, played by different actresses than the original show.

=== Viewership ===
In the table below, the blue number represents the lowest ratings and the red number represents the highest ratings.

| Episode No. | Timeslot (UTC+07:00) | Air date | Average audience share | CH3 Website | TrueID | Ref. |
|---|---|---|---|---|---|---|
| 1 | Saturday 11:00 pm | 19 Nov 2022 | 0.4% | 41.7K | 37.4K | |
| 2 | Saturday 11:00 pm | 26 Nov 2022 | 0.3% | 39.5K | 33.2K | |
| 3 | Saturday 11:00 pm | 3 Dec 2022 | 0.3% | 39.6K | 28.9k | |
| 4 | Saturday 11:00 pm | 10 Dec 2022 | 0.2% | 44.8K | 31.8K | |
| 5 | Saturday 11:00 pm | 17 Dec 2022 | 0.4% | 48.5K | 33.7K | |
| 6 | Saturday 11:00 pm | 24 Dec 2022 | 0.3% | 61.8K | 36.7K | |
| 7 | Saturday 11:00 pm | 7 Jan 2023 | 0.3% | - | - | |
| 8 | Saturday 11:00 pm | 14 Jan 2023 | 0.5% | 59.9K | 40.9K | |
| 9 | Saturday 11:00 pm | 21 Jan 2023 | 0.4% | 52.7K | 40.3K | |
| 10 | Saturday 11:00 pm | 28 Jan 2023 | 0.5% | 57.3K | 41.6K | |
| 11 | Saturday 11:00 pm | 4 Feb 2023 | 0.5% | 59.3K | 47.1K | |
| 12 | Saturday 11:00 pm | 11 Feb 2023 | 0.6% | 84.3K | 51.4K | |
| Average | | | 0.4% ^{1} | | | |

^1 Based on the average audience share per episode.

== Awards and nominations ==
Name of the award ceremony, year presented, category, nominee of the award, and the result of the nomination
| Award | Year | Category | Nominee/work | Result | Ref. |
|---|---|---|---|---|---|
| BIC Seven Awards | 2024 | LGBTQ+ Spotlight | Sarocha Chankimha and Rebecca Patricia Armstrong | Won | |
| Feed Y Capital Awards | 2023 | Couple of the Year | Sarocha Chankimha and Rebecca Patricia Armstrong | Won | |
| Feed Y Capital Awards | 2023 | Actress of the Year | Rebecca Patricia Armstrong | Won | |
| Feed Y Capital Awards | 2023 | Series of the Year | Gap: The Series | Won | |
| Howe Awards | 2023 | Hottest Series Award | Gap: The Series | Won | |
| Howe Awards | 2023 | Best Couple Award | Sarocha Chankimha and Rebecca Patricia Armstrong | Won | |
| Huading Awards | 2023 | Global Most Popular Actress in a TV Series | Rebecca Patricia Armstrong | Nominated | |
| Japan Expo Thailand Award | 2024 | Japan Expo Actors Award | Sarocha Chankimha and Rebecca Patricia Armstrong | Won | |
| Kazz Awards | 2023 | Popular Female Teenage Award | Sarocha Chankimha | Won | |
| Kazz Awards | 2023 | Rising Female of the Year | Rebecca Patricia Armstrong | Won | |
| Kazz Awards | 2023 | Couple of the Year | Sarocha Chankimha and Rebecca Patricia Armstrong | Won | |
| Kazz Awards | 2023 | Series of the Year | Gap: The Series | Won | |
| Kazz Awards | 2024 | Couple of the Year | Sarocha Chankimha and Rebecca Patricia Armstrong | Won | |
| Kazz Awards | 2024 | Popular Female Teenage Award | Rebecca Patricia Armstrong | Won | |
| Kazz Awards | 2024 | Popular Vote | Sarocha Chankimha | Won | |
| Kom Chad Luek Awards | 2024 | Best Couple of the Year | Sarocha Chankimha and Rebecca Patricia Armstrong | Won | |
| Kom Chad Luek Awards | 2024 | Most Popular Actress | Sarocha Chankimha | Won | |
| Maya TV Awards | 2023 | Song of the Year Award | "Pink Theory" | Nominated | |
| Maya TV Awards | 2023 | Series of the Year Award | Gap: The Series | Nominated | |
| Maya TV Awards | 2023 | Female Rising Star of the Year Award | Rebecca Patricia Armstrong | Nominated | |
| Maya TV Awards | 2023 | Female Rising Star of the Year Award | Sarocha Chankimha | Won | |
| Maya TV Awards | 2023 | Couple of the Year Award | Sarocha Chankimha and Rebecca Patricia Armstrong | Won | |
| Mellow Pop Top Viral | 2023 | Top Viral Idol Chart – March | Gap: The Series | Won | |
| Nakarat Awards | 2023 | People's Choice | (with Becky Armstrong) | Nominated | |
| Nakarat Awards | 2023 | Rising star of the Year | Sarocha Chankimha | Nominated | |
| Nine Entertain Awards | 2023 | People Choice's Award | Sarocha Chankimha and Rebecca Patricia Armstrong | Won | |
| Sanook Top of the Year Awards | 2023 | Best Couple of the Year | Sarocha Chankimha and Rebecca Patricia Armstrong | Won | |
| Sanook Top of the Year Awards | 2023 | Female Rising Star | Sarocha Chankimha | Won | |
| Sanook Top of the Year Awards | 2023 | Female Rising Star | Rebecca Patricia Armstrong | Nominated | |
| Sanook Top of the Year Awards | 2023 | Best Series | Gap: The Series | Won | |
| SEC Awards | 2023 | Best Asian Series | Gap: The Series | Won | |
| SEC Awards | 2023 | Favorite Couple in a Series | Sarocha Chankimha and Rebecca Patricia Armstrong | Won | |
| Superstar Maya Awards | 2023 | Superstar Maya Idol Female | Sarocha Chankimha | Won | |
| Superstar Maya Awards | 2023 | Superstar Maya Idol Female | Rebecca Patricia Armstrong | Nominated | |
| Superstar Maya Awards | 2023 | Superstar Maya Idol Couple | Sarocha Chankimha and Rebecca Patricia Armstrong | Nominated | |
| Thai Update Awards | 2023 | The Best TV Series | Gap: The Series | Won | |
| Thailand Social Awards | 2024 | Best Creator Performance on Social Media (Actor & Actress) | Sarocha Chankimha | Nominated | |
| Thailand Social Awards | 2024 | Best Creator Performance on Social Media (Actor & Actress) | Rebecca Patricia Armstrong | Nominated | |
| Thailand Social Awards | 2024 | Best Content Performance on Social Media (Thai Series) | Gap: The Series | Nominated | |
| TPOP STAGE | 2023 | OST of the Week | "Order from my heart" | Won | |
| TPOP STAGE | 2023 | OST of the Week | "Whisper" | Won | |
| TPOP STAGE | 2023 | OST of the Week | "Think Alike" | Won | |
| YUniverse Awards | 2023 | Best Novel | Chao Pla Noy | Nominated | |
| YUniverse Awards | 2023 | Best Writing | Chao Pla Noy | Won | |
| YUniverse Awards | 2023 | Best Character | Chao Pla Noy | Nominated | |
| YUniverse Awards | 2023 | Rising Star Award | Rebecca Patricia Armstrong | Won | |
| YUniverse Awards | 2023 | Best Couple Award | Sarocha Chankimha and Rebecca Patricia Armstrong | Won | |
| YUniverse Awards | 2023 | The Best Series OST | "Pink Theory" | Won | |
| YUniverse Awards | 2023 | The Best Y Series | Gap: The Series | Nominated | |
| YUniverse Awards | 2023 | Y Iconic Star | Sarocha Chankimha | Nominated | |
| YUniverse Awards | 2023 | Best Cuties | Rebecca Patricia Armstrong | Nominated | |
| BreakTudo Awards 2023 | 2023 | Shipp de Ficção (Fictional Ship) | Gap: The Series | Won | |
| Sanook Top of the Year Awards 2023 | 2024 | The Best Series of the Year | Gap: The Series | Won | |
| 2024 Thailand Headlines Person of the Year Awards | 2024 | The Most Popular on-screen Couple of The Year Award | Gap: The Series | Won | |
| The Viral Hits Awards 2024 | 2025 | Most Popular Yuri Series of the Year Award | Gap: The Series | Nominated | |
| Thai GL Awards Japan 2025 | 2025 | Best Work Award | Gap: The Series | Won | |
| Thai GL Awards Japan 2025 | 2025 | Best Music Award | "No More Blues" | Won | |
| Y Entertain Awards 2025 | 2025 | Most Popular Y Novel | Gap: The Series | Nominated | |

| Won | 39 |
| Nominated | 19 |
| Total Nominations | 58 |

*Few private voting based recognitions are not mentioned here.
