= Becky Armstrong =

Thai entertainer (born 2002)

- เบคกี้ อาร์มสตรอง
- Armstrong at the 2026 Cannes Film Festival
- Born: Rebecca Patricia Armstrong; 5 December 2002 (age 23); Bangkok, Thailand
- Education: University of Essex
- Occupations: Actress; singer
- Years active: 2020–present
- Agents: Idol Factory (2020–2025); KOLAB Asia (2025–present); Becky Entertainment (2025–present); CAA (2026–present)
- Notable work: Mon in Gap; Anil in The Loyal Pin; Kath in Uranus 2324; Nanno in Girl from Nowhere: The Reset
- Height: 165 cm (5 ft 5 in)
- Website: www.beckyentertainment.co

Rebecca Patricia Armstrong (รีเบคก้า แพทรีเซีย อาร์มสตรอง; born 5 December 2002) is a Thai actress and singer.

She is best known for portraying Nanno in Girl from Nowhere: The Reset (2026), which entered Netflix's Top 10 in 67 countries and regions and reached No. 9 on Netflix's global television chart during its opening week. Armstrong's performance as Nanno earned her the Rising Star of the Year award at the 2026 Korea International Streaming Festival (KISF) Global OTT Awards.

She is also known for her roles as Mon in Gap (2022), Namo in Long Live Love! (2023), and Princess Anin in The Loyal Pin (2024). She received a nomination for Best Supporting Actress at the 32nd Suphannahong National Film Awards for her performance in Long Live Love!, which grossed more than THB100 million (US$3 million) at the Thai box office.

In 2026, Armstrong signed with Creative Artists Agency (CAA), becoming the first Thai actress to receive international representation from the agency. The same year, she was appointed Global Brand Ambassador for L'Oréal Paris and Brand Ambassador for Tod's, and made her solo music debut under Wild Group with the single "Skin".

== Early life and education ==
Rebecca Patricia Armstrong was born on 5 December 2002 in Bangkok, Thailand, to a Thai mother and a British father. She has an older brother.

Armstrong spent her childhood between Australia, Thailand, and New Zealand. She attended Shrewsbury International School, Wattana Wittaya Academy, and Victoria College, Belfast. She later enrolled at the University of Essex to study Criminology and Psychology.

== Career ==
=== 2016–2022: Early appearances and breakthrough ===
At age 13, Armstrong appeared as a contestant on the Thai talent competition television series Thailand's Got Talent. She later recalled that she had auditioned for several talent shows before beginning her acting career.

Armstrong's acting career began in 2020 when she played Thanya, a supporting character in TharnType 2: 7 Years of Love, a sequel to the series TharnType. She was announced as part of the cast in May 2020 via Twitter. The series premiered in November of that year.

In early 2022, Armstrong played the supporting role of Fon in Secret Crush on You. Later that year, she played Mon, her first leading role, in Gap: The Series, Thailand's first girls' love television series, opposite Sarocha Chankimha. Armstrong and Chankimha became known collectively as FreenBecky. The series brought Armstrong widespread international recognition and several awards, and later surpassed 900 million views on YouTube.

=== 2023–2024: Film expansion and leading roles ===
In 2023, Armstrong played Namo, a supporting character in the romantic comedy film Long Live Love!, which follows a dysfunctional family attempting to repair their relationships. Released theatrically in Thailand in June 2023, the film grossed more than 100 million baht and was subsequently released internationally on Netflix in October. For her performance, Armstrong was nominated for Best Supporting Actress at the 32nd Suphannahong National Film Awards.

In 2024, Armstrong starred as Kath in the romantic science-fiction film Uranus 2324, opposite Chankimha. Produced by VelCurve Studio and directed by James Thanadol, the film was released theatrically in Thailand on 4 July 2024. It topped the Thai domestic box office on its opening day, earning more than 2 million baht in Bangkok and Chiang Mai. The film also received selected screenings at film festivals and in several international markets, including Mexico, Australia and the Philippines, and later became available through selected streaming services in parts of Asia, Europe and Latin America.

Later that year, Armstrong played Princess Anilaphat Sawetwarit, commonly known as Princess Anin, in The Loyal Pin, a period girls' love television series and her second leading television role. Her character is a royal who returns to Thailand after studying abroad and reunites with her childhood companion, Lady Pilanthita Kasidit. The series premiered on 4 August 2024 and was broadcast in Thailand on Workpoint TV, while being made available internationally through Idol Factory's YouTube channel.

Armstrong described the production as one of the most challenging experiences of her career because the period drama required her to deliver dialogue in formal and archaic Thai. To prepare for the role, she highlighted unfamiliar words in her scripts and repeatedly rehearsed her lines throughout the day. Filming continued for approximately eight months. The series later surpassed 300 million views and was reported as one of the most socially engaged Thai series of 2024 and one of the country's most rewatched dramas of 2025.

=== 2025–present: Independent career and international expansion ===
In February 2025, Armstrong's relationship with L'Oréal Paris expanded when she was appointed as one of the brand's makeup ambassadors. She subsequently represented the company at the Cannes Film Festival in May 2025. Her role with the company later expanded to cosmetics, and she was described as a global cosmetics ambassador in 2026.

In March 2025, Armstrong was announced as a Chanel house ambassador following previous collaborations and appearances at the brand's events.

In 2025, Armstrong was included in The Business of Fashion's annual BoF 500 list in recognition of her international influence in fashion and entertainment, including her work with Chanel and L'Oréal Paris. Harper's Bazaar Thailand subsequently appointed Armstrong as its first muse, with plans to collaborate on content reflecting her work in fashion, lifestyle and the arts.

On 14 October 2025, Armstrong concluded her contract with her former talent agency and established her own company, Becky Entertainment. According to the company's announcement, it was created to give Armstrong greater creative and professional control over her acting, music, personal style and storytelling.

In November 2025, she entered into a partnership with Kolab Asia for the management of brand partnerships and other commercial activities, primarily in Thailand and elsewhere in Asia.

In March 2026, Armstrong took over the role of Nanno in Girl from Nowhere: The Reset, a standalone reimagining of the Girl from Nowhere franchise set in a new universe. The six-episode mystery thriller was produced by GINGERx, SOUR Bangkok and Parbdee Taweesuk, with each episode directed by a different filmmaker. Armstrong portrayed Nanno as a mysterious transfer student who moves between schools and exposes cruelty by turning power, guilt and desire against those who abuse them.

The series premiered on 7 March 2026 on One 31 and the oneD application in Thailand, and was released globally on Netflix. Her performance earned her a nomination for Best Newcomer (Female) and the Rising Star of the Year award at the 2026 KISF Global OTT Awards in South Korea. The latter marked her first award from a South Korean awards ceremony.

Also in 2026, Armstrong signed with Wild Entertainment Group to formally begin her solo music career. She released her debut single, "Skin", on 1 May 2026.

In April 2026, Armstrong signed with Creative Artists Agency (CAA) for international representation in film and television, becoming the first Thai actress represented by the agency in those areas.

In May 2026, Armstrong starred as Crown Princess Blue of the fictional country of Medalinn in The Air, an action romance drama adapted from a novel by Salmon and produced by North Star Entertainment. Part of the 4 Elements anthology, the series follows Blue after her arrival in Thailand, where police officer Vayo Wathinwanit is assigned to protect her. Armstrong portrayed both the real princess and an impostor posing as her, distinguishing the two characters through their expressions and mannerisms.

The series marked Armstrong's fourth leading production opposite Chankimha and the third television series released as part of the anthology. It premiered on 16 May 2026 during prime time on Channel 7 HD and was made available internationally through iQIYI. Its premiere achieved a nationwide television rating of 2.2 and was reported as the highest-rated debut for a Thai girls' love or boys' love television series. It also recorded the highest first-day international viewership for a Thai series released on iQIYI that year.

== Personal life ==
Armstrong's interests include football, tennis, archery, shooting and rock climbing. She is a swimmer and kick-boxes as workout. She has two French Bulldogs, Bonbon and Boba.

== Filmography ==
=== Film ===
Year	Title	Role	Notes	Ref.
2023	Long Live Love!	Namo	Main role	
2023	No Worries	Herself	Short film	
2024	Uranus 2324	Kathriya "Kath" Raywat	Main role	
2025	4 ป่าช้า (Graveyards Horror)	Pun	Main role	

=== Television ===
Year	Title	Role	Notes	Ref.
2020	TharnType 2: 7 Years of Love	Thanya	Supporting role	
2022	Secret Crush on You	Fon	Supporting role	
2022	Gap	Kornkamon "Mon" Phetpailin	Main role	
2024	The Loyal Pin	Princess Anilaphat "Anin" Sawetawarit	Main role	
2026	Girl from Nowhere: The Reset	Nanno	Main role	
2026	4 Elements: The Air	Princess Catherine Blew de Laina of Madelin / Helena	Main role	
2026	4 Elements: The Fire	Blew Wathinwanit	Guest role	
TBA	Cranium †	Dr. Busaya "Bua" Methin	Main role	

Key
†	Denotes television productions that have not yet been released

== Music videos ==
Year	Song title	Artist	Notes	Ref.
2022	"Pink Theory" (ทฤษฎีรักนี้สีชมพู)	with Sarocha Chankimha	From Gap OST	
2023	"Marry Me"	with Sarocha Chankimha	From Gap OST	
2023	"แอบรักไม่ทำให้ใครตาย" (No Worries)	LYKN		
2023	"ดาวหางฮัลเลย์" (Halley's Comet)	with Tee Jets (พิพิธพล พุกกะณะสุต)	Fellow Fellow cover	
2023	"No More Blues"	with Sarocha Chankimha	From Gap OST	
2024	"Rule Your Own Pink"	Becky Armstrong	Collaboration with Maybelline Thailand	
2024	"มองหน้ากันไม่ติด" (Awkward)	โอ๊ต ปราโมทย์ Feat. Maiyarap, with Sarocha Chankimha		
2024	"Cheevee" (ชีวี)	with Sarocha Chankimha	From The Loyal Pin OST	
2024	"Dancing Queen"	Jackrin Kungwankiatichai		
2025	"Ride or Die"	Jeff Satur		
2025	"Pantone"	Becky Armstrong		
2025	"Wildflower"	Becky Armstrong	Billie Eilish cover	
2025	"เธอ" (You)	with Looknam Orntara Poolsak (Nam) and Ploy Rawintera Phanpatthana (Ploynoii)	Cocktail cover	
2025	"ละลาย" (Melt)	with Sarocha Chankimha	Four-Mod cover	
2025	"Fire Boy"	with Sarocha Chankimha	PP Krit cover	
2026	"Skin"	Rebecca Armstrong		

== Discography ==
Becky began using the name Rebecca Armstrong upon officially launching her career as a singer.

=== Singles ===
==== As lead artist ====
Year	Title	Artist	Label	Ref.
2025	"Pantone"	Becky Rebecca	Idolpop Music	
2026	"Skin"	Rebecca Armstrong	WILD Group	
2026	"Stuck in Between"	Rebecca Armstrong	WILD Group	

=== Soundtrack appearances ===
Year	Title	Soundtrack	Artist	Ref.
2022	"ทฤษฎีรักนี้สีชมพู" (Pink Theory)	Gap OST	Becky Rebecca and Sarocha Chankimha	
2022	"คิดเหมือนกัน" (Think Like Me)	Gap OST	Becky Rebecca	
2023	"ทฤษฎีรักนี้สีชมพู" (Pink Theory) (Bossa version)	Gap OST	Becky Rebecca and Sarocha Chankimha	
2023	"No More Blues"	Gap OST	Becky Rebecca and Sarocha Chankimha	
2024	"Cheevee" (ชีวี)	The Loyal Pin OST	Becky Rebecca and Sarocha Chankimha	
2026	"รักฉันบ้างหรือเปล่า" (Don't You Love Me)	4 Elements: The Earth OST	Becky Rebecca	
2026	"แค่มีเธอก็พอแล้ว (Only You)"	4 Elements: The Air OST	Becky Rebecca	

== Ambassadorship ==
Year	Period	Brand	Position	Notes	Ref.
2024	2024–present	Zeekr Thailand	Friend of the Brand		
2025	2025	Chanel	House Ambassador		
2025	2025	Central World	Brand Ambassador		
2025	2025	Central Pattana	Brand Ambassador		
2025	2025–present	L'Oréal Paris	Global Cosmetics Ambassador		
2025	2025–present	Harper's Bazaar Thailand	Muse		
2026	2026–present	BioActive+	Presenter		
2026	2026–present	Major Popcorn	Presenter		
2026	2026–present	Tao Kae Noi	Brand Ambassador		
2026	2026–present	Sunsilk Thailand	Presenter		
2026	2026–present	OPPO Thailand	OPPO Finder		
2026	2026–present	Tod's	Brand Ambassador	for Southeast Asia	

== Commercials ==
Year	Date	Brand	Category	Campaign or advertisement	Ref.
2023	7 July	Nestlé / Kit Kat	Food	"Take a Break with KitKat, Fall in Love with Long Live Love!"	
2024	12 January	Maybelline	Beauty	"Becky – Rule Your Own Pink"	
2025	7 April	Vivo Thailand	Consumer electronics	Vivo V50 Songkran campaign	
2025	31 July	Chanel	Beauty	"Radiate like Rebecca Armstrong with every look"	
2025	1 August	Chanel	Beauty	"Radiate like Rebecca Armstrong with Le Rouge Duo Ultra Tenue"	
2026	8 March	BioActive+	Food supplement	"Liquid Collagen"	
2026	9 Apri	Major Popcorn	Food	Becky Armstrong Major Cineplex popcorn cup campaign	
2026	20 April	Tao Kae Noi	Food	"A Day in GenZ(eaweed) Life with Becky"	
2026	20 April	Sunsilk Thailand	Hair care	Sunsilk Bouncy Big Hair	
2026	1 May	Sunsilk Thailand	Hair care	Sunsilk Bouncy Big Hair	
2026	3 August	Sunsilk Thailand	Hair care	Sunsilk Glycol Gloss	

== Media image ==
=== Endorsements and brand partnerships ===
Becky's partnership with L'Oréal Paris began in February 2025 with a make-up ambassadorship and expanded to a broader cosmetics role in May. In May 2026, Becky's official profile listed her as a global cosmetics ambassador for L'Oréal Paris. She represented the brand at the Cannes Film Festival in both 2025 and 2026.

In March 2025, Becky was appointed a house ambassador for Chanel. Prior to the appointment, she attended the house's spring/summer 2025 and Métiers d'Art 2024–25 shows, and the appointment was announced during its fall/winter 2025 presentation in Paris. Chanel subsequently described Becky as an actress and house ambassador on its official website.

In October 2024, Becky was appointed a Friend of Zeekr by Zeekr Thailand. In a 2025 interview produced in association with the company, she discussed the responsibility of representing a brand and her experience working with the Zeekr 009 electric vehicle.

In October 2025, Harper's Bazaar Thailand appointed Becky as the magazine's first muse. The partnership was intended to include jointly produced content reflecting her identity through fashion, lifestyle and artistic expression.

In 2026, Becky expanded her commercial portfolio into the wellness sector when she became the official presenter for BioActive+ Concentrated Liquid Collagen. She also served as a presenter or ambassador for Sunsilk Thailand, Tao Kae Noi and OPPO Thailand.

Becky began working with Italian fashion house Tod's in February 2026, when she attended its fall/winter 2026–27 women's show during Milan Fashion Week. In July, she attended the opening of the brand's flagship boutique at Takashimaya Shopping Centre in Singapore.

In August 2026, Tod's appointed Becky as its brand ambassador from Southeast Asia, making her the first Thai person to hold the Brand Ambassador title. She was also announced to attend the house's spring/summer 2027 fashion show in Milan on 25 September.

=== Fashion and editorial appearances ===
In January 2026, Becky attended the Australian Open in Melbourne as a guest of Polo Ralph Lauren. Ralph Lauren had served as the tournament's official outfitter since 2021.

Becky later appeared on the print cover of Vogue Singapore's April 2026 “Retrofuture” issue in an editorial featuring Ralph Lauren. In an accompanying interview, she discussed her work in acting, music and modelling, describing modelling as a means of connecting with fashion and visual expression.

=== Literary interests ===
Becky has expressed an interest in reading. In 2025, she appeared in Chanel's literary interview series In the Library, in which she discussed the role of books in her life and shared a selection of works that had accompanied her throughout it.

Her selections included Susan Cain's Quiet, Ichiro Kishimi and Fumitake Koga's The Courage to Be Disliked, Louisa May Alcott's Little Women, L. M. Montgomery's Anne of Green Gables, and Alicia Malone's Girls on Film: Lessons from a Life of Watching Women in Movies.

=== Social views and philanthropy ===
In August 2024, Becky attended UNHCR Thailand's Moment of Hope charity event in Bangkok. The event raised funds to support the work of the United Nations High Commissioner for Refugees for stateless children and women in Thailand.

In a 2025 interview with L'Officiel Thailand, Becky expressed support for social equality and environmental protection. When asked what she would do for the world, she said that she wanted people to have equal rights and called for collective action against global warming. She also welcomed the enactment of Thailand's marriage equality law, saying that everyone should have the right to love and marry regardless of gender.

In a 2026 interview with Tatler Asia, Becky discussed the values she hoped to convey through soft power. She said that she wanted people to become who they wished to be and to take pride in themselves without being constrained by their age, gender or criticism from others.

== Accolades ==
=== Awards and nominations ===
Won	96
Nominated	39
Total Nominations	142

*Few private voting based recognitions are not mentioned here.

Year	Award	Category	Nominated work	Result	Ref.
2023	Mellow Pop Top Viral Chart	Top Viral Idol Chart for March	Gap	Won	
2023	36th Global Film and Television Huading Awards	Global Most Popular Actress in a TV Series	Gap	Nominated	
2023	Kazz Awards	หนุ่มสาววัยใสโดนใจแห่งปี Sao Wai Sai (2nd Place)		Won	
2023	Kazz Awards	Rising Female of the Year		Won	
2023	Kazz Awards	Couple of the Year	(with Sarocha Chankimha)	Won	
2023	Maya TV Awards	Female Rising Star of the Year		Nominated	
2023	Maya TV Awards	Couple of the Year	(with Sarocha Chankimha)	Won	
2023	Nine Entertain Awards	People's Choice	Gap	Won	
2023	SEC Awards 2023 (Brazil)	Favorite Couple in a Series	Gap (with Sarocha Chankimha)	Won	
2023	SEC Awards 2023 (Brazil)	Best Asian Series	Gap	Won	
2023	Feed Y Capital Awards	Most Popular Actor		Won	
2023	Feed Y Capital Awards	Most Popular Couple	(with Sarocha Chankimha)	Won	
2023	Feed Y Capital Awards	Most Popular Series	Gap (with Sarocha Chankimha)	Won	
2023	Howe Awards	The Best Couple Award	(with Sarocha Chankimha)	Won	
2023	Howe Awards	Hottest Series	Gap	Won	
2023	Thai Update Awards	The Most Favorite Young Female Star		Won	
2023	Thai Update Awards	The Best TV Series	Gap	Won	
2023	Superstar Maya Idol Awards	Superstar Maya Idol Female		Nominated	
2023	Superstar Maya Idol Awards	Superstar Maya Idol Couple	(with Sarocha Chankimha)	Nominated	
2023	Y Universe Awards	สาขา The Best Series OST	"Pink Theory"	Won	
2023	Y Universe Awards	สาขา The Best Couple	(with Sarocha Chankimha)	Won	
2023	Y Universe Awards	สาขา Rising Star		Won	
2023	BreakTudo Awards	Shipp de Ficção (Fictional Ship)	MonSam Gap	Won	
2023	GQ Men of The Year (Thailand)	Nation's Trending Stars	(with Sarocha Chankimha)	Won	
2024	Japan Expo Thailand Award 2024	Japan Expo Actors Award	(with Sarocha Chankimha)	Won	
2024	Sanook Top of the Year Awards	The Best Couple Award	(with Sarocha Chankimha)	Won	
2024	Sanook Top of the Year Awards	The Best Thai Movie of the Year	Long Live Love!	Won	
2024	Sanook Top of the Year Awards	The Best Series of the Year	Gap	Won	
2024	12th Thailand Social Awards	Best Content Performance: (Series)	Gap	2nd place	
2024	12th Thailand Social Awards	Best Content Performance: (Movie)	Long Live Love!	2nd place	
2024	12th Thailand Social Awards	Best Creator Performance on Social Media - Actor & Actress		2nd place	
2024	Kazz Awards	Popular Female Teenage Award		Won	
2024	Kazz Awards	Couple of the Year	(with Sarocha Chankimha)	Won	
2024	คมชัดลึก อวอร์ด (Komchadluek Awards)	ดาวรุ่งยอดเยี่ยม Best Rising Star		Nominated	
2024	คมชัดลึก อวอร์ด (Komchadluek Awards)	สาขาคู่จิ้นยอดนิยม Popular Vote: Couple of the Year	(with Sarocha Chankimha)	Won	
2024	Nine Entertain Awards	Couple of the Year	(with Sarocha Chankimha)	Won	
2024	Mint Awards 2024	Best Digital Cover of the Year	(with Sarocha Chankimha)	Won	
2024	Feed Y Capital Awards 2024	Most Popular Couple	(with Sarocha Chankimha)	Won	
2024	Maya TV Awards 2024	Couple of the Year	(with Sarocha Chankimha)	Won	
2024	Tpop Stage	OST of the Week	"Cheevee" (ชีวี)	Won	
2024	32nd Suphannahong National Film Awards or the National Film Awards	Best Actress in a Supporting Role	Long Live Love	Nominated	
2024	Tpop Stage	OST of the Week	"Cheevee" (ชีวี)	Won	
2024	2024 Thailand Headlines Person of the Year Awards	The Most Popular on-screen Couple of The Year Award	(with Sarocha Chankimha)	Won	
2024	BreakTudo Awards 2024	International Fandom of the Year	"FreenBecky"	Won	
2024	BreakTudo Awards 2024	Fiction Ship	AnilPin from The Loyal Pin	Won	
2024	2024 Y Ent Awards	Princess of Girls' Love		Nominated	
2024	2024 Y Ent Awards	Y Couple of the Year	(with Sarocha Chankimha)|	Won	
2025	Sanook Top of the Year Awards 2025	Most Popular Series of the Year	The Loyal Pin	Won	
2025	Sanook Top of the Year Awards 2025	Best Couple of the year	(with Sarocha Chankimha)	Won	
2025	HUB Awards 2024	Series of The Year	The Loyal Pin	Won	
2025	HUB Awards 2024	Couple of The Year	(with Sarocha Chankimha)	Won	
2025	HUB Awards 2024	Chemistry of The Year	(with Sarocha Chankimha)	Won	
2025	HUB Awards 2024	Main Couple of The Year	(with Sarocha Chankimha)	Won	
2025	HUB Awards 2024	Kiss Scene of The Year	The Loyal Pin	Won	
2025	HUB Awards 2024	Dramatic Scene of The Year	The Loyal Pin	Won	
2025	HUB Awards 2024	Opening of The Year	The Loyal Pin	Won	
2025	HUB Awards 2024	Best Production of The Year	The Loyal Pin	Won	
2025	13th Thailand Social Awards	Best Content Performance on Social Media - (Series)	The Loyal Pin	Won	
2025	13th Thailand Social Awards	Best Creator Performance on Social Media - (Movie)	The Loyal Pin	2nd place	
2025	13th Thailand Social Awards	Best Creator Performance on Social Media - Actor & Actress		2nd place	
2025	Tpop Stage	Rookie of the Week (Week 7)	"Pantone"	Won	
2025	Tpop Stage	Rookie of the Week (Week 8)	"Pantone"	Won	
2025	Tpop Stage	Rookie of the Week (Week 9)	"Pantone"	Won	
2025	Tpop Stage	Rookie of the Week (Week 10)	"Pantone"	Won	
2025	Thailand Box Office Movies & Series Awards 2024	Best Couple of the Year	(with Sarocha Chankimha)	Nominated	
2025	Thailand Box Office Movies & Series Awards 2024	Series of The Year (GL)	The Loyal Pin	Nominated	
2025	Thailand Box Office Movies & Series Awards 2024	Movies of The Year	Uranus 2324	Nominated	
2025	Mellow Pop	Best Couple of The Month 2024	(with Sarocha Chankimha)	Won	
2025	Zoomdara Awards 2025	The Hottest Couple of The Year [Female]	(with Sarocha Chankimha)	Nominated	
2025	Madame Mount Awards 2025	Couple of the Year	(with Sarocha Chankimha)	Nominated	
2025	Tpop Stage	Best [Y] Original Soundtrack	"Cheevee (ชีวี)"	Won	
2025	Thai Update Awards 2025	The Best Drama Series of The Year	The Loyal Pin	2nd place	
2025	The Viral Hits Awards 2024	Most Popular Yuri Series of the Year Award	Gap The Series	Nominated	
2025	The Viral Hits Awards 2024	Most Popular Yuri Series of the Year Award	The Loyal Pin	Nominated	
2025	The Viral Hits Awards 2024	Best Yuri Series Couple of the Year Award	(with Sarocha Chankimha)	Nominated	
2025	The Viral Hits Awards 2024	Popular Couple	(with Sarocha Chankimha)	Won	
2025	Nine Entertain Awards 2025	Couple of the Year	(with Sarocha Chankimha)	Won	
2025	Kazz Awards 2025	Series of The Year 2025	The Loyal Pin	Won	
2025	Kazz Awards 2025	Couple of The Year 2025	(with Sarocha Chankimha)	Won	
2025	Thai GL Awards Japan 2025	Best Couple Award	(with Sarocha Chankimha)	Won	
2025	Thai GL Awards Japan 2025	Best Work Award	The Loyal Pin	Won	
2025	Thai GL Awards Japan 2025	Best Work Award	Gap The Series	Won	
2025	Thai GL Awards Japan 2025	Next Big Work Award	Cranium	Won	
2025	Thai GL Awards Japan 2025	Best Music Award	"No More Blues"	Won	
2025	Thai GL Awards Japan 2025	Best Music Award	"Cheevee (ชีวี)"	Won	
2025	Thai GL Awards Japan 2025	Best Episode Award	The Loyal Pin: Episode 9	Won	
2025	Bangkok Pride Awards 2025	Pride Popular of Series / Drama	The Loyal Pin	Nominated	
2025	Bangkok Pride Awards 2025	Pride Popular Of Sapphic Series Star	(with Sarocha Chankimha)	Nominated	
2025	Thailand Y Content Awards 2024.	Best Film	Uranus 2324	Nominated	
2025	Thailand Y Content Awards 2024.	Best series	The Loyal Pin	Nominated	
2025	Thailand Y Content Awards 2024.	Best Cinematography	The Loyal Pin	Nominated	
2025	Thailand Y Content Awards 2024.	Best Art Direction	The Loyal Pin	Nominated	
2025	Thailand Y Content Awards 2024.	Best Series Screenplay	The Loyal Pin	Nominated	
2025	Thailand Y Content Awards 2024.	Best Thai Cultural Promotion	The Loyal Pin	Nominated	
2025	Thailand Y Content Awards 2024.	Best Costume Design	The Loyal Pin	Nominated	
2025	Thailand Y Content Awards 2024.	Couple of The Year	(with Sarocha Chankimha)	Won	
2025	SEC Awards 2025 (Brazil)	Asian Series	The Loyal Pin	Won	
2025	SEC Awards 2025 (Brazil)	Favorite Couple	AnilPin: The Loyal Pin	Won	
2025	SEC Awards 2025 (Brazil)	Asian Series Performance	The Loyal Pin	Won	
2025	Mint Awards 2025	Best Digital Cover of The Year - December 2024	(with Sarocha Chankimha)	Won	
2025	Feed X Khaosod Awards 2025	Popular Actress Award	The Loyal Pin	Won	
2025	Feed X Khaosod Awards 2025	Best Chemistry	(with Sarocha Chankimha)	Nominated	
2025	Feed X Khaosod Awards 2025	Popular drama series	The Loyal Pin	Nominated	
2025	Feed X Khaosod Awards 2025	Top-Tier GL Series of the Year	The Loyal Pin	Nominated	
2025	Feed X Khaosod Awards 2025	Couple of The Year	(with Sarocha Chankimha)	Nominated	
2025	33rd Suphannahong National Film Awards 2025	Popular Movie	Uranus 2324	Won	
2025	Y Entertain Awards 2025	Y Couple of the Year	(with Sarocha Chankimha)	Won	
2025	Y Entertain Awards 2025	Hottest The Best Couple Award	(with Sarocha Chankimha)	Nominated	
2025	Y Entertain Awards 2025	Howe Hottest Series Award	The Loyal Pin	Nominated	
2025	Y Entertain Awards 2025	Female Couple of the Year	(with Sarocha Chankimha)	Nominated	
2025	BreakTudo Awards 2025 (Brazil)	International Fandom of the Year	(with Sarocha Chankimha)	Nominated	
2025	BreakTudo Awards 2025 (Brazil)	GL Series of the Year	The Loyal Pin	Nominated	
2025	Maya Awards 2025	Female Couple of the Year	(with Sarocha Chankimha)	Won	
2025	Harper's Bazaar Thailand's Muse and WOTY 2025	Breakthrough Award honoree		Won	
2026	Y Universe Awards2025	The Best Coming Soon	Cranium	Won	
2026	HUB Awards 2025	Most Anticipated Premiere	4 Elements	Won	
2026	Thairath Awards 2025	Female Couple of the Year	(with Sarocha Chankimha)	Won	
2026	14th Thailand Social Awards	Best Entertainment Figures on Social Media awards		2nd place	
2026	The Viral Hits Awards 2025	Best Yuri Couple of the Year	(with Sarocha Chankimha)	Nominated	
2026	Nine Entertain Awards 26	Couple of the Year	(with Sarocha Chankimha)	Won	
2026	Kazz Awards 2026	Popular Female Teenage		Won	
2026	Kazz Awards 2026	Couple of the Year	(with Sarocha Chankimha)	Won	
2026	Superstar Idol Awards 26	Popular Female Couple of the Year	(with Sarocha Chankimha)	Nominated	
2026	Tpop Stage	Ost of the Week (Week 10)	Don't You Love Me (4 Elements)	Won	
2026	Bangkok Pride Awards 2026	Pride Popular of Movie	(with Sarocha Chankimha)	Won	
2026	Tpop Stage	Popular of the Week (Week 22)	Skin	Won	
2026	2026 Asia Contents Awards & Global OTT Awards	Best New Female Actress	Girl From Nowhere: The Reset	Nominated	
2026	2026 Asia Contents Awards & Global OTT Awards	People's Choice Award (Female Actor)	Girl From Nowhere: The Reset	Nominated	
2026	2026 Asia Contents Awards & Global OTT Awards	Rising Star of the Year	Girl From Nowhere: The Reset	Won	
2026	Tpop Stage	Ost of the Week (Week 25)	Only You (The Air)	Won	
2026	Tpop Stage	Popular of the Week	Only You (The Air)	Won	
2026	Mint Awards 2026	Best Digital Cover Of The Year		Won	
2026	FEED x KHAOSOD Awards	Most Popular Female		Nominated	
2026	FEED x KHAOSOD Awards	Most Popular Series/Drama	4 Elements: The Air	Nominated	
2026	Seoul International Drama Awards 2026	Outstanding Asian Star (Thailand)	Girl From Nowhere: The Reset	Won	
2026	Maya TV Awards 2026	Charming Female of the Year		Nominated	
2026	Maya TV Awards 2026	Female Couple of the Year	(with Sarocha Chankimha)	Won	
2026	Maya TV Awards 2026	Popular Vote of the Year		Nominated	
2026	BreakTudo Awards (Brazil) 2025	International Fandom of the Year	(with Sarocha Chankimha)	Pending	
2026	BreakTudo Awards (Brazil) 2025	GL Series of the Year	4 Elements: The Air	Pending	

=== Listicles ===
Year	Publisher	Listicle	Placement	Ref.
2024	TC Candler	The 100 Most Beautiful Faces of 2024	13th place	
2025	TC Candler	The 100 Most Beautiful Faces of 2025	7th place	
