= Vogue Thailand =

- Editor-in-Chief: Kullawit Laosuksri
- Categories: Fashion
- Frequency: Monthly
- Publisher: Serendipity Media
- Founded: January 25, 2013
- First issue: February 2013
- Country: Thailand
- Based in: Central Tower; Bangkok 10330; Thailand
- Language: Thai
- Website: vogue.co.th
- ISSN: 2286-8674
- OCLC: 1289727352

Vogue Thailand (Thai: โว้กไทยแลนด์) it is a monthly fashion magazine from Thailand that covers clothing styles, including haute couture, beauty, culture, lifestyle, and runway shows. It is the 21st international edition, with the first issue being February 2013.The first model, Pichsini Tanviboon, wore a headpiece designed by hat designer Philip Tracey. Kullawit Laosuksri has served as the first editor-in-chief until the present day.

== History ==
James Woolhouse, President of Asia Pacific at Condenast International. Vogue Thailand was established in 2013 under Serendipity Media Co., Ltd. The first editor-in-chief was Kullawit Laosuksri, and Siri Udomritiruj served as the chief executive officer. Both had experience in the fashion publishing industry, having previously worked with Elle Thailand magazine. The first issue's cover featured model Pichsini Tanviboon wearing a gold lace hat resembling a traditional Thai headdress designed by Philip Tracy. There was also a special first-issue cover given to guests at the launch event, featuring Namthip Jongrachatawiboon, who was also wearing a similar headdress.

== Criticism ==
When the first issue of Vogue Thailand was released, it received mixed reviews. Yoninah Eliza from The Fashion Spot said, "It's good to see them embracing a little bit of Thai culture in the first issue, and the cover is beautiful in a gold tone that looks really great. It's a good way to start a new issue. They still have a lot of room to improve, which I'm sure they will in the next issue, but for the first cover, I think it's quite lovely." Nolan Ong commented, "The art direction on the cover is outstanding, but it doesn't quite reflect the values of Vogue. It's more like Madame Figaro. However, I believe the content and the contributors within will meet the standards of Condénest." Reuters noted that Vogue's appearance in Thailand raises questions about the country's income inequality and the stark disparity between the lifestyles of many city dwellers in Bangkok and the 66 percent of the population living in slums on the outskirts of the city, or in rural areas far from modern conveniences and upscale shopping malls.

The November 2013 issue, featuring model Naomi Campbell on the cover, was criticized for excessively altering her skin tone.
