= Fourever You =

2024–25 Thai television series

- เพราะรักนำทาง
- Genre: Romantic drama; Romantic comedy; Boys' love
- Based on: East: Tag!, You're Mine; North: How Much Is Your Love?; by Howlsairy
- Written by: Rampha Phetchart; Utchariyakorn Sirikam
- Directed by: Siwaj Sawatmaneekul; Nantalit Tampacha
- Starring: Ponlawit Ketprapakorn; Katsamonnat Namwirote; Ratchata Pichetshote; Suradet Piniwat
- Music by: Sompob Pokepoon
- Country of origin: Thailand
- Original language: Thai
- No. of seasons: 1
- No. of episodes: 17

Production
- Producer: Studio Wabi Sabi
- Running time: 45 minutes

Original release
- Network: GMM 25
- Release: October 3, 2024 – January 16, 2025

Related
- Fourever You 2

Fourever You (Thai: เพราะรักนำทาง) is a 2024–2025 Thai boys' love romantic comedy television series produced by Studio Wabi Sabi and broadcast on GMM 25. The series stars Ponlawit Ketprapakorn (Pond), Katsamonnat Namwirote (Earth), Ratchata Pichetshote (Maxky) and Suradet Piniwat (Bas) . It is based on the novels East: Tag!, You're Mine and North: How Much Is Your Love? by Howlsairy.

The series premiered on 3 October 2024 on GMM 25 and was simultaneously released on WeTV. In July 2025, the series was internationally released on Rakuten Viki.

== Synopsis ==
Easter begins studying at a university in Chiang Mai in an attempt to move on from his previous relationship with Hill, which ended unexpectedly. Upon arriving at the university, he discovers that Hill has become his mentor. Meanwhile, North, Easter's roommate, finds himself in debt after a night of drinking. Johan, the person demanding repayment, begins pursuing him, leading to a complicated relationship between the two.

== Cast and characters ==
=== Main ===
- Ponlawit Ketprapakorn (Pond) as Hill
- Katsamonnat Namwirote (Earth) as Easter
- Ratchata Pichetshote (Maxky) as Johan
- Suradet Piniwat (Bas) as North

=== Supporting ===
- Patsapon Jansuppakitkun as Tonfah
- Methaphat Chimkul as Typhoon
- Anupart Luangsodsai as Arthit
- Tharathon Phumphothingam as Daotok
- Benjanee Watcharavasoontara as Christmas
- Saranvut Nittayasuthi as Suea (Tiger)
- Pasatorn Lertsathitwong as Nao
- Pannin Charnmanoon as Thanmild
- Wanut Sangtianprapai as Foam
- Weerapat Toemmaneerat as Pheem
- Chanitcha Pimthong as Bua
- Supakorn Wuttinansurasit as Ikkyu
- Samantha Melanie Coates as Mei Li
- Waratchaya Noliam as Jia
- Weeramethachai as Prang
- Pakphum Jitpisutsiri as Ryu

=== Guest ===
- Puwanai Sangwan as Ton (Ep. 5)
- Saran Anantasetthakul as Day (Ep. 8)
- Peeradol Kitsakulpanit as Than (Ep. 12)
- Pakpoom Juanchainat as James (Ep. 14, 16)
- Natkharin Tankaew as Frank (Ep. 16)

== Production ==
The series was produced by Studio Wabi Sabi, with Siwaj Sawatmaneekul and Nantalit Tampacha serving as directors. The screenplay was written by Rampha Phetchart and Utchariyakorn Sirikam.

Fourever You is based on the novels East: Tag!, You're Mine and North: How Much Is Your Love? by Howlsairy. The project was officially introduced by Studio Wabi Sabi in 2024 as part of the Fourever You Project franchise.

== Release ==
The series premiered on 3 October 2024 on GMM 25, airing weekly on Thursdays. Episodes were also made available through WeTV. The final episode aired on 16 January 2025. In July 2025, the series was internationally released on Rakuten Viki.

== Soundtrack ==
Title	Artist(s)	Length	Ref.
"คืนนิรันดร์" (Forever Night)	Ponlawit Ketprapakorn and Katsamonnat Namwirote	3:41	
"Love Is Everywhere"	Boy Sompob	3:40	
"Love Is Everywhere"	Cast of Fourever You	3:58	
"แรงดึงดูด" (Law of Attraction)	Ratchata Pichetshote and Hatsanat Piniwat	4:03	

== Live events ==
=== Fan meetings ===
Year	Date	Title	Venue	Ref.
2024	26 September	Fourever You Pre-Screen	Siam Pavalai Royal Grand Theatre, Bangkok	
2025	25 January	Fourever You Final Episode Fan Meeting	Siam Pavalai Royal Grand Theatre, Bangkok	
2025	22 February	For You Forever Fan Meeting	Idea Live, Bravo BKK, Bangkok	
2025	17 May	Fourever You Fan Meeting	Macau	
2025	21 June	Fourever You Fan Meeting	Cambodia	
