= Ratchata Pichetshote =

Thai actor

- รชต พิเชฐโชติ
- Born: 27 July 1994 (age 31); Thailand
- Other name: Maxky (แม็กกี้)
- Occupations: Actor, model
- Years active: 2017–present

Ratchata Pichetshote (Thai: รชต พิเชฐโชติ; born 27 July 1994), professionally known as Maxky (Thai: แม็กกี้), is a Thai actor and model. He made his acting debut in 2017 in the boys' love series Make It Right 2. In 2022, he starred in the BL series Why You... Y Me?, followed by a leading role in Fourever You in 2024. In 2026, he stars in the BL series Be My Player Two.

== Filmography ==
=== Television ===
| Year | Title | Role | Notes | Network / Platform |
|---|---|---|---|---|
| 2017 | Make It Right 2 | Phop | Supporting role | Channel 9 MCOT HD |
| 2021 | Girl2K | Nurse | Guest role (ep. 10) | GMM25 |
| 2022 | Why You... Y Me? | Paul | Main role | GMM25 |
| 2024 | My Cherie Amour | Khacha Chinnaworn / Anan Klaikan | Guest role (eps. 2–3) | Channel 3 |
| 2024 | Fourever You | Johan ("Jo") | Main role | GMM25 / WeTV |
| 2025 | Fourever You 2 | Johan ("Jo") | Supporting role | GMM25 / WeTV |
| 2026 | Be My Player Two | Thi ("THR33") | Main role | WeTV |

== Events ==
| Year | Event | Venue | Notes |
|---|---|---|---|
| 2024 | FOUREVER YOU Pre-Screen Special Event | Siam Pavalai Theatre, Bangkok | Special screening of the series with the cast. |
| 2025 | JohanNorth: The Glowing of Love Special Event | KBank SIAM PIC-GANESHA Theatre | Launch event for the JohanNorth special episodes. |
| 2025 | MaxkyBas "My Home Your Home" 1st Fan Meeting | IDEA LIVE, BRAVO BKK | First official fan meeting of Maxky and Bas. |

== Discography ==
=== Singles ===
| Year | Title | Album / Series | Credits | Ref. |
|---|---|---|---|---|
| 2024 | "FOREVER YOU" | Fourever You (Original Soundtrack) | With Earth Katsamonnat, Pond Ponlawit, Bas Hatsanat, Bever Patsapon, Tonliew Methaphat, Ngern Anupart and Oat Tharathon. | |
| 2025 | "จนตลอดกาล" (Forevermore) | Special JohanNorth (Original Soundtrack) | Duet with Suradet Piniwat (Bas). | |
| 2026 | "แรงดึงดูด" (Watch It Burn) | Be My Player Two (Original Soundtrack) | Duet with Suradet Piniwat (Bas). | |
