= Fourever You 2 =

2025–26 Thai television series

- Official poster
- เพราะรักนำทาง พาร์ท 2
- Genre: Drama / Romance / Boys' love
- Directed by: Natthanon Kheeddee
- Starring: Beside the Sky: Patsapon Jansuppakitkun (Bever); Methaphat Chimkul (Tonliew); The Sun From Another Star: Anupart Luangsodsai (Ngern); Tharathon Phumphothingam (Oat); Lately, It's Winter Season: Saranvut Nittayasuthi (Pie); Pasatorn Lertsathitwong (Golf)
- Country of origin: Thailand
- Original language: Thai
- No. of seasons: 1
- No. of episodes: 24 (divided into 3 arcs)

Production
- Executive producer: Siwaj Sawatmaneekul
- Cinematography: Saran Jantharakkha; Chonticha Suttiphaet
- Running time: 58–59 minutes
- Production company: Studio Wabi Sabi

Original release
- Network: WeTV; GMM 25
- Release: 18 December 2025 – present

Related
- Fourever You

Fourever You 2 (Thai: เพราะรักนำทาง พาร์ท 2) is the second season of the Thai boys' love project Fourever You. It was produced by Studio Wabi Sabi and airs on WeTV. The season has three separate arcs, each with eight episodes and its own main couple. The three pilots came out on 22 February 2025 on Studio Wabi Sabi's YouTube channel.

== Beside The Sky ==
=== Synopsis ===
The first arc, Beside The Sky (ต้นฟ้าไต้ฝุ่น), stars Bever Patsapon Jansuppakitkun as Tonfah and Tonliew Methaphat Chimkul as Typhoon. It aired from 18 December 2025 to 31 January 2026, on Saturdays, with eight episodes of 58 minutes each. It's based on a novel with the same name.

Tonfah and Typhoon grew up as neighbors. Something happened that pulled them apart. Years later, they run into each other again at university. Typhoon has some emotional baggage and figures out how to trust people again. Slowly, their friendship turns into something more.

=== Cast and characters ===
==== Main ====
- Patsapon Jansuppakitkun (Bever) as Tonfah (ต้นฟ้า) / "Fah"
- Methaphat Chimkul (Tonliew) as Typhoon Teerapat Chaowakornkul (ไต้ฝุ่น ธีรภัทร เชาวกรกุล) / "Phoon"

==== Supporting ====
- Anupart Luangsodsai (Ngern) as Arthit
- Tharathon Phumphothingam (Oat) as Dao
- Ponlawit Ketprapakorn (Pond) as Hill
- Katsamonnat Namwirote (Earth) as Easter / "Ter"
- Ratchata Pichetshote (Maxky) as Johan / "Jo"
- Hatsanat Piniwat (Bas) as North Natchanan
- Jidapa Phonrojpanya (Tontoei) as Torfun / "Fun"
- Wanut Sangtianprapai (Mix) as Foam

== Original soundtrack ==
Title	Artist(s)	Arc	Ref.
"ใต้ฟ้าเดียวกัน" (Tai Fah Diaw Gan)	Patsapon Jansuppakitkun (Bever) and Methaphat Chimkul (Tonliew)	Beside The Sky	

== The Sun From Another Star ==
=== Synopsis ===
The second arc, The Sun From Another Star (#อาทิตย์ดาวตก), stars Ngern Anupart Luangsodsai as Arthit and Oat Tharathon Phumphothingam as Daotok. It aired from 4 March to 15 April 2026, on Wednesdays, with eight episodes of 59 minutes each.

Daotok can see and talk to ghosts. Arthit lives next door and wants to find the spirit of his dead mother. Daotok agrees to help, even though he's not really into it. While they're looking into things, they start getting closer and end up falling for each other.

=== Cast and characters ===
==== Main ====
Source:

=== Cast and characters ===
==== Main ====
- Anupart Luangsodsai (Ngern) as Arthit (อาทิตย์) / "Thit"
- Tharathon Phumphothingam (Oat) as Daotok (ดาวตก) / "Dao"

==== Supporting ====
- Patsapon Jansuppakitkun (Bever) as Tonfah (ต้นฟ้า) / "Fah"
- Methaphat Chimkul (Tonliew) as Typhoon Teerapat Chaowakornkul (ไต้ฝุ่น ธีรภัทร เชาวกรกุล) / "Phoon"
- Penpetch Benyakul (Jab) as Direk
- Ponlawit Ketprapakorn (Pond) as Hill
- Katsamonnat Namwirote (Earth) as Easter / "Ter"
- Ratchata Pichetshote (Maxky) as Johan / "Jo"
- Suradet Piniwat (Bas) as North Natchanan
- Ratchaneeboon Pheinwikraisophon (Kiwi)
- Thanakom Minthananan (Win)
- Naruemon Khampan (Jennie)

==== Guest ====
- Natsakan Chairote (Gunner) as Khram (episodes 3–4)
- Nara Sudprasert (Seua) as Kim Tae Min

== Original soundtrack ==
Title	Artist(s)	Arc	Ref.
"ข้างไหล่" (Khang Lai)	Anupart Luangsodsai (Ngern) and Tharathon Phumphothingam (Oat)	The Sun From Another Star	

== Lately, It's Winter Season ==
=== Synopsis ===
The third arc, Lately, It's Winter Season (ไทเกอร์เดือนหนาว), stars Pie Saranvut Nittayasuthi as Suer (Tiger) and Golf Pasatorn Lertsathitwong as Nao. It will run from 14 May to 25 June 2026, with eight episodes. The show will air on WeTV and also on GMM 25.

Suer is the son of a crime family. For six years, he's been in love with his best friend Nao but never said anything. He's scared of getting rejected and worried about the dangers that come with his family background. One winter, he decides to take a chance and finally confess.

=== Cast and characters ===
==== Main ====
- Saranvut Nittayasuthi (Pie) as Suea / "Tiger" / "Ger"
- Pasatorn Lertsathitwong (Golf) as Dueannao / "Nao"

==== Supporting ====
- Nanthawat Phaiboonphattana (Earth) as Dannue
- Tanapon Hathaidachadusadee (Kade) as Field
- Benjamin Greenwell (Ben) as Mickey / "Mick"
- Waratthip Kittiphaisan (Euro) as Apo
- Sorathon Chaloemlapsombut (Jay)
- Supakorn Wuttinansurasit (Tor)

==== Guest ====
- Sittan Supakriangkrai (Aong) as Leo
- Sutthipong Sutthi-aroonrat (Ome) as Ben

== Production ==
The director is Natthanon Kheeddee. Siwaj Sawatmaneekul (New) is the executive producer. Cinematography was handled by Saran Jantharakkha (Reon) and Chonticha Suttiphaet (Sai). The soundtrack was composed by Sompob Pokepoon (Boy).

The three pilots dropped together on 22 February 2025 on Studio Wabi Sabi's YouTube channel. Each arc is based on a different Thai novel.

== Reception ==
The Bangkok Post said that The Sun From Another Star gave a "boost" to the BL genre in Thailand. TrueID Entertainment commented on the emotional impact of Beside The Sky and the anticipation for the other arcs. MGR Online reported on the simultaneous release of the three pilots and called Studio Wabi Sabi's strategy "innovative". Innnews also covered the release and the fans' expectations.
