= Ma Chérie (disambiguation) =

"Ma Chérie" is a song by Swiss producer DJ Antoine.

Ma Chérie may also refer to:

- "Ma Chérie ~Itoshii Kimi E~", a song by Japanese visual kei band Malice Mizer

== See also ==
- Bonne nuit ma chérie, the German entry in the Eurovision Song Contest 1960
- My Cherie Amour (disambiguation)
