= Sai Lub Lip Gloss =

Thai television soap opera

- Thai: สายลับลิปกลอส
- Genre: Romantic comedy; drama; action
- Directed by: Nattaphong Wongkaveepairot
- Starring: Pakorn Chatborirak; Pichukkana Wongsarattanasin; Lapassalan Jiravechsoontornkul; Itthipat Thanit; Kannarun Wongkajornklai; Kawin Imanothai
- Country of origin: Thailand
- Original language: Thai
- No. of episodes: 15

Original release
- Network: Channel 3
- Release: 28 October – 27 November 2022

Sai Lub Lip Gloss (Thai: สายลับลิปกลอส), is a Thai television soap opera starring Pakorn Chatborirak, Pichukkana Wongsarattanasin, Lapassalan Jiravechsoontornkul, Itthipat Thanit, Kannarun Wongkajornklai, and Kawin Imanothai.

Directed by Nattaphong Wongkaveepairot, the series aired on Channel 3 from 28 October to 27 November 2022.

Sai Lub Lip Gloss tells the story of a clumsy beautician who becomes a spy, while also searching for the perfect man.

== Cast and characters ==
=== Main ===
- Pakorn "Boy" Chatborirak as Teeraphat "Tee" Anantathanakarn; Sai Lub Team
- Pichukkana "Namtarn" Wongsarattanasin as Bararee "Nu Lee", Pornnapha's daughter
- Lapassalan "Mild" Jiravechsoontornkul as Nampueng "Pueng" Rungreungrattanakid, Mina's daughter
- Itthipat "God" Thanit as Danuphob "Phob", online journalist
- Kannarun "Prang" Wongkajornklai as Yadpirun "Pon" Khanjanawithoo, Nu Lee's friend and Dr. Ekachai's daughter
- Kawin "Panjan" Imanothai as Warakorn "Korn" Raksasat, Teeraphat's friend

=== Supporting ===
- Sirium Pakdeedumrongrit as Madame Gee, owner of GCosMagic
- Nirut Sirijanya as Senit, a police officer
- Apinun Prasertwattanakulas Mr. Prakarn, owner of M PARADISE hotel
- Daraneenuch Pohpiti as Pornnapa, Jum's elder sister and Nu Lee's mother
- Suzana Renaud as Saruta "Ta" Lerngwatcharakul
- Thongchai Thongkanthom as Pach
- Vichayut Limratanamongkolas Tawich "Ped" Wareechat
- Sasapin Siriwanij as Mali Chua-Chod
- Surasak Chaiat as Dr. Eakkachai Khanjanawithoo, Pon's father
- Nathakron Traikitsyavet as Tai, Mr. Prakarn's henchman
