= Saranvut Nittayasuthi =

Thai actor and model (born 2000)

- พาย ศรัณวุฒิ นิตยสุทธิ
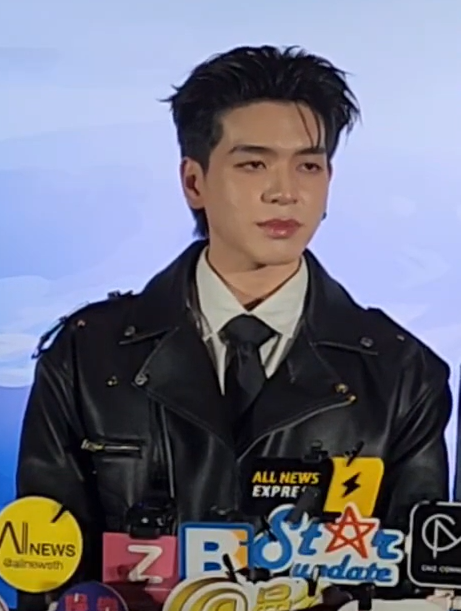
- Pie in 2026
- Born: 20 December 2000 (age 25); Thailand
- Other name: Pie (พาย)
- Education: Kasetsart University (Mechanical Engineering)
- Occupation: Actor
- Years active: 2022–present
- Agent: Studio Wabi Sabi
- Height: 1.81 m (5 ft 11 in)

Saranvut Nittayasuthi (Thai: ศรัณวุฒิ นิตยสุทธิ; born 20 December 2000), known as Pie (Thai: พาย), is a Thai actor. In 2022, he starred in the series Restart(ed) on WeTV and MCOT. In 2023, he starred in the feature film Moments of Love. In 2024, he acted in Fourever You which aired on GMM 25, and in May 2026, he star in the BL series Fourever You 2.

== Career ==
Pie made his acting debut in 2022 in the BL series Restart(ed), playing Chin (Rachin Pholawat), one of the main characters. In 2023, Saranvut starred alongside Thitiphong Sengngai in the segment "My Heartless Boy" from the anthology BL film Moments of Love, directed by Tanwarin Sukkhapisit.

Also in 2023, Saranvut was announced as one of the lead actors of the Studio Wabi Sabi BL project Star Scope alongside Pasatorn Lertsathitwong. The project's official pilot was released on YouTube on 23 November 2023.

In 2024, Pie played Suea (Tiger/Ger) in the series Fourever You, which aired on GMM25, appearing as part of the secondary couple alongside Pasatorn Lertsathitwong (Golf).

In January 2025, Saranvut participated in the Fourever You Final Episode special event held at Siam Pavalai Royal Grand Theatre in Bangkok alongside the main cast of the series.

In 2026, Saranvut reprised his role as Suea (Tiger/Ger) in Fourever You 2, starring alongside Pasatorn Lertsathitwong in the arc Lately, It's Winter Season, adapted from the novel of the same name.

== Filmography ==
=== Television ===
Year	Title	Role	Notes	Network/Platform	Ref.
2022	Restart(ed)	Chin (Rachin Pholawat)	Main role	WeTV, MCOT	
2023	Star Scope (pilot)	Khobkhet	Main role (only 1 episode)	YouTube (Studio Wabi Sabi)	
2024	Fourever You	Suea (Tiger/Ger)	Supporting role	GMM25, WeTV	
2026	Fourever You 2	Suea (Tiger/Ger)	Main role	WeTV, GMM25	
2026	Be My Player Two	TBA	Supporting role	WeTV	

=== Film ===
Year	Title	Role	Notes	Ref.
2023	Moments of Love	Pie	Main role	

==== Soundtrack appearances ====
Year	Title	Artist(s)	Notes	Ref.
2026	"FOREVER YOU"	Earth Katsamonnat, Pond Ponlawit, Maxky Ratchata, Bas Hatsanat, Bever Patsapon, Tonliew Methaphat, Ngern Anupart, Oat Tharathon, Pie Saranvut and Golf Pasatorn	Fourever You เพราะรักนำทาง OST	

==== Music video appearances ====
Year	Title	Performer	Role	Ref.
2026	"เพื่อน(ไม่)รัก" (Friend (Not) Love) - OST Lately, It's Winter Season	Boy Sompob	Appeared in the official music video	

=== Fan meetings and events ===
Year	Date	Name	Venue	Ref.
2026	10 May	Lately, It's Winter Season Pre-Screen	Major Cineplex Ratchayothin	
