= Ghostfluencer =

2026 Thai comedy horror romance film

- Ghostfluencer poster.
- สาปเมือง
- Directed by: Anawat Phromchae
- Written by: Anawat Phromchae
- Produced by: Worapoj Mueanboon; Jantaras Jear
- Starring: Pichukkana Wongsarattanasin; Boonyakait Wongsajaem; Phulita Supinchompooas
- Music by: Good Morning Monday Studio
- Production company: M Studio
- Release date: May 14, 2026 (Thailand)
- Running time: 105 minutes
- Country: Thailand
- Language: Thai

Ghostfluencer (Thai: สาปเมือง) is a 2026 Thai comedy horror romance film written and directed by Anawat Phromchae.

== Plot ==
A nameless female ghost from Northern Thailand seeks to become a legendary spirit remembered by future generations. To create an unforgettable love story, she begins searching for her soulmate from a previous life, but complications arise when he is reincarnated as a firecracker maker, something she cannot approach.

== Cast ==
- Pichukkana Wongsarattanasin as Fangkham
- Boonyakait Wongsajaem as Sai
- Phulita Supinchompooas as Buatong
- Thanachet Namwong as Khamma
- Patteerat Laemluang as Pankaew
- Pongpun Suwee as Nuanjan
- Nattachot Sriponwaree as Bataeng
- Patinya Tangtragul as Sai's father
- Patiphan Suteerapinyo as Temple host
- Thanakrit Paengkantha as Village chief

== Production ==
The film was produced by M Studio and directed by Anawat Phromchae, who also wrote the screenplay.

== Release ==
Ghostfluencer was theatrically released in Thailand on 14 May 2026. The film was released on Netflix on 17 September 2026.

== Original soundtrack ==
- เมื่อฉันได้มารักเธอ (When I Found You) by Sarah salola
