= Restart(ed) =

2022 Thai television series

- Thai: ขอรักอีกครั้งได้ไหม
- Literally: Restart(ed)
- Genre: Romantic drama; Boys' love; Romantic comedy
- Written by: Paphangkorn Ponnara
- Directed by: Paphangkorn Ponnara (Ton)
- Starring: Thanabot Yeamponmakun; Saranvut Nittayasuthi; Sutthiphong Sutthi-arunrat; Nattapong Phothikhonoi
- Country of origin: Thailand
- Original language: Thai
- No. of episodes: 12

Production
- Production company: Cloth_Lab+ Entertainment

Original release
- Network: Channel 9 MCOT HD; WeTV
- Release: 30 January – 20 March 2022

Restart(ed) (Thai: ขอรักอีกครั้งได้ไหม) is a 2022 Thai series that mixes romantic drama, comedy and boys' love (BL). It was directed by Paphangkorn Ponnara and produced by Cloth_Lab+ Entertainment. The show ran from 30 January to 20 March 2022, with new episodes every Sunday at 11 p.m. on Channel 9 MCOT HD. It was also available on WeTV.

== Synopsis ==
The show follows a bunch of university students figuring out their feelings. "Yu" (Thanabot Yeamponmakun) is a freshman. During orientation week, he meets "Chin" (Saranvut Nittayasuthi), an older student. They become friends, but there's more going on underneath. Then there's "Seemai" (Sutthiphong Sutthi-arunrat). He's your classic nerd, all about studying and nothing else. That changes when he meets "So" (Nattapong Phothikhonoi), a younger student who throws his whole world off balance.

The series touches on identity, figuring out your sexuality, and being afraid to fall for someone. It asks whether these couples can get past their own fears and give love another shot.

== Cast and characters ==
=== Main ===
- Thanabot Yeamponmakun (Dong) as Yu
- Saranvut Nittayasuthi (Pie) as Chin
- Sutthiphong Sutthi-arunrat (Ohm) as Seemai
- Nattapong Phothikhonoi (Oat) as So
- Phumiphat Chatchairungruang (Bank) as Jed
- Wisarut Suwanjit (Tee) as Unwa

=== Supporting ===
- Jatnipat Channarakul (Frame) as Jeng
- Aekapol Saeheng (Tiger) as BB
- Nuttapong Suriyapattanalapa (Nut) as Arno
- Rapeepan Jantaranipa (Cherry) as Tisa
- Jettanut Mahattanapruet (Boss) as Patt
- Jamin (Top) as Tin
- Jinna Pichit-O-Pakun (Mild) as Rak

=== Guest ===
- Jirawat Vachirasarunpatra (War) as Chin's father
- Naarpa Navawutcharakul (May)

== Production ==
The show was made by Cloth_Lab+ Entertainment. Paphangkorn Ponnara (Ton) both wrote and directed it. The official trailer dropped on YouTube on 18 October 2021. It aired on Channel 9 MCOT HD as part of their 2022 lineup, which also included other Thai shows. The series was available for streaming on WeTV.

== Soundtrack ==
Title	Artist	Notes	Ref.
"ขอรักอีกครั้ง"	Jeaniich	Official soundtrack for Restart(ed) ขอรักอีกครั้งได้ไหม	
