= The Yarns =

Thai thriller mystery television series (2025)

- ปริศนาปมไหม
- Genre: Thriller; Mystery; Crime
- Written by: Chayanan Liaophairoj (ชญานิน เลี่ยวไพโรจน์); Tinnana Simaphaisan (ติณณา สิมะไพศาล) (eps. 1–2); Phanek Chuaychusap (พันธุ์เอก ช่วยชูทรัพย์) (eps. 3–12)
- Directed by: Warayu Rakkul (วรายุ รักษ์กุล)
- Starring: Chaiyapol Julian Pupart; Nalinthip Sakulongampai; Chatchaya Samerngraj; Thatpong Rojsangruang; Hatthaya Wongkrachang
- Country of origin: Thailand
- Original language: Thai
- No. of seasons: 1
- No. of episodes: 12

Production
- Executive producer: Sorawit Subun (สรวิชญ์ สุบุญ)

Original release
- Network: Mono Max
- Release: 17 January – 21 February 2025
- Network: Mono 29
- Release: 4 August – 9 September 2025

The Yarns (Thai: ปริศนาปมไหม) is a Thai thriller, mystery and crime television series that aired in 2025. Starring Chaiyapol Julian Pupart and Nalinthip Sakulongampai, the series aired every Friday on the Mono Max application from 17 January to 21 February 2025, totaling 12 episodes. It was later rebroadcast on Mono 29 from 4 August to 9 September 2025.

== Synopsis ==
A series of brutal murders terrorizes the country. The killer leaves balls of yarn and mysterious codes next to each victim. Lieutenant Colonel Pilanthon (Chaiyapol Julien Poupart), a young police officer, is assigned to investigate the case. To decipher the codes, he teams up with Sky (Nalinthip Sakulongumpai), an autistic woman obsessed with solving all kinds of puzzles.

As the investigation progresses, Pilanthon begins to suspect that the killer may be someone very close to him.

== Cast ==
=== Main ===
Actor	Role
Chaiyapol Julien Poupart (New)	Lieutenant Colonel Pilanthon
Nalinthip Sakulongumpai (Bua)	Sky
Chatchaya Samerngraj (Neen)	Anya
Thatpong Rojsangruang (Heng)	Marc
Hatthaya Wongkrachang (Ple)	Su Khwan

== Awards and nominations ==
Year	Award	Category	Nominee(s)	Result	Ref.
2025	Asian Television Awards 2025	Best Southeast Asian Drama (Original Screenplay)	Chayanan Liaophairoj, Tinnana Simaphaisan, Phanek Chuaychusap	Won	
2025	Asian Television Awards 2025	Best Southeast Asian Drama Series	The Yarns	Nominated	
2025	Star International Awards 2025	Best Leading Actress in a Standout Role	Nalinthip Sakulongampai	Won	
2026	Pantip TV Awards (5th edition)	Best Online Platform Series	The Yarns	Nominated	
2026	Nataraja Awards (17th edition)	Best Television Screenplay	Chayanan Liaophairoj, Tinnana Simaphaisan, Phanek Chuaychusap	Nominated	
