= 2 Brothers =

2019 Thai television series

- Thai: 2 Brothers – แผนลวงรักฉบับพี่ชาย
- Genre: Romantic comedy; Drama
- Directed by: Ekkasit Trakulkasemsuk
- Starring: Sattaphong Phiangphor; Suradet Piniwat; Dhanundhorn Neerasingh
- Country of origin: Thailand
- Original language: Thai
- No. of episodes: 12

Production
- Running time: 50 minutes
- Production company: Star Hunter Studio

Original release
- Network: GMM 25; LINE TV
- Release: 16 February – 11 May 2019

2 Brothers (Thai: 2 Brothers – แผนลวงรักฉบับพี่ชาย) is a 2019 Thai television series starring Sattaphong Phiangphor (Tao), Suradet Piniwat (Bas) and Dhanundhorn Neerasingh (Fang).

Directed by Ekkasit Trakulkasemsuk and produced by Star Hunter Studio, the series premiered on GMM 25 and LINE TV on 16 February 2019, airing on Saturdays at 21:25 ICT. The series concluded on 11 May 2019.

== Cast and characters ==
Below are the cast of the series:

=== Main ===
- Sattaphong Phiangphor (Tao) as Pete / Chanan
- Suradet Piniwat (Bas) as Tony
- Dhanundhorn Neerasingh (Fang) as Kaopun

=== Supporting ===
- Prachakorn Piyasakulkaew (Sun) as Badin
- Theewara Panyatara (Bank) as Bad
- Suttatip Wutchaipradit (Ampere) as Pancake
- Chomchai Chatwilai (Add) as Grandmother Sompit
- Ampha Phoosit as Jam
- Ratawan Aomtisong (Min) as Brownie
- Naerunchara Lertprasert (Neko) as Pat
- Methakorn Supapantaree (Ice) as Taro
- Krit Atthaseri (Kling) as Theeradeth, Badin's father

=== Guest role ===
- Suppapong Udomkaewkanjana (Saint) as Phat (Ep. 12)

== Soundtracks ==
Song title	Romanized title	English title	Artist	Ref.
รักฉันหมายความว่าเธอ	Rak Chan Maikhwam Wa Tur	Curious?	Dhanundhorn Neerasingh (Fang)	
ลมหายใจคือเธอ	Lomhaichai Khu Tur	All I Need	Dhanundhorn Neerasingh (Fang)	
ลมหายใจคือเธอ	Lomhaichai Khu Tur	All I Need	Sattaphong Phiangphor (Tao)	
