= Don't Be Too Emotional =

2026 Thai television series

- Official trailer poster
- อย่าขอพี่เจน
- Genre: BL; Romantic drama; Supernatural
- Written by: Hwang Sol
- Directed by: Tee Bundit Sintanaparadee (ตี๋ บัณฑิต สินธนภารดี)
- Starring: Boonyakait Wongsajaem; Thatpong Rojsangruang
- Country of origin: Thailand
- Original language: Thai
- No. of seasons: 1
- No. of episodes: 12

Production
- Producer: Anusorn Limprasert (บอส อนุสรณ์ ลิ้มประเสริฐ)
- Production companies: DeeHup House; iQIYI

Original release
- Network: iQIYI
- Release: 26 June – 11 September 2026

Don't Be Too Emotional (Thai: อย่าขอพี่เจน) is a Thai boys' love (BL) television series with romantic drama and supernatural elements, starring Boonyakait Wongsajaem (Tee) and Thatpong Rojsangruang (Heng). Directed by Tee Bundit Sintanaparadee and produced by Anusorn Limprasert, the series is adapted from Hwang Sol's novel Rule No.1: Don't Be Too Emotional. It is a co-production between DeeHup House and the iQIYI platform.

The official pilot was released on 27 February 2026 on DeeHup House's YouTube channel, accumulating over 2.8 million views by May 2026. The series is scheduled to premiere on 26 June 2026 exclusively on iQIYI.

== Synopsis ==
Jane Patrick (Boonyakait Wongsajaem) is a university student with a campus reputation for granting wishes, each of which comes with a steep price. As a result, most students keep their distance. Jenn Alee (Thatpong Rojsangruang), a football player, ignores warnings to stay away from Jane. After a chance encounter, he approaches Jane to retrieve a ball. As their relationship develops, Jenn Alee begins to see a different side of Jane Patrick, uncovering questions about his identity and the true nature of his power.

== Cast and characters ==
=== Main ===
- Boonyakait Wongsajaem (Tee) as Jane Patrick / "Jane Yai"
- Thatpong Rojsangruang (Heng) as Jenn Alee / "Jane Lek"

=== Recurring ===
- Phattharapon Dejpongwaranon (Donut) as Dan
- Palat Chayutnitiroj (Korn) as Putt
- Tanthai Tatchapol Thitiapichai (Gap)
- Maki Machida Sutthikulphanich as Jean
- Tom Phollawat Manuprasert as Little Jane's father
- Namfon Sueangsuda Lawanprasert as Little Jane's mother
- Chatchawit Techarukpong (Victor) as Ram
- Byron Bishop as Big Jane's father
- Duangjai Hiransri (Pure) as Putt's mother
- Praew Hassaya Isariyasereekul as Rose, a lawyer
- Namwa Thapanee Suparattanapirak as Jui
- Fluk Nithikorn Chaiwan as Job
- Rattawich Meechai (Pann) as Toy

== Soundtrack ==
Don't Be Too Emotional OST
No.	Title	Artist	Length
1.	"Colorblind" (Opening theme)	Jung PERSES featuring GeniePak	03:42
2.	"เคยรักกันหรือเปล่า (Was I just a lie?)" (Ending song of EP 06)	sarah salola	03:53

== Production ==
iQIYI announced the series as part of its original lineup in partnership with DeeHup House. The blessing ceremony took place on 6 April 2026 at the Ganesha shrine in CentralWorld, Bangkok.

Tee Bundit Sintanaparadee (Tee Bundit) directed the series. Anusorn Limprasert (Boss), founder of DeeHup House, served as executive producer. His previous works include Lovely Writer (2021) and I Feel You Linger in the Air (2023). The screenplay is based on Hwang Sol's novel Rule No.1: Don't Be Too Emotional (อย่าขอพี่เจน); Hwang was also involved in the adaptation.

Filming began in 2026 in Bangkok. The series reunites actors Tee Boonyakait and Heng Thatpong, who previously appeared together in the short series LOVETRUCK รักสองแถว. The production team noted their on-screen chemistry.

== Release ==
The official pilot was released on 27 February 2026 on DeeHup House's YouTube channel, garnering over 2.8 million views within three months. The same pilot was made available on the iQIYI platform, where it received an average user rating of 9.9/10. The series is scheduled to premiere on June 26, 2026, exclusively on iQIYI. The official trailer was released on the iQIYI Thailand YouTube channel on 10 June 2026. According to Thai press reports, the series adopts a darker, more dramatic tone, exploring the "dark romance" subgenre with fantasy elements and supernatural bargains.

== Reception ==
Following its release, the pilot received positive feedback from audiences, who praised the chemistry between the leads, the dark atmosphere, and the dramatic potential of the story. The series' hashtag trended on X (formerly Twitter) in Thailand after the pilot's release.

Critics highlighted iQIYI's investment in bolder narratives and the choice of director Tee Bundit, known for his work on high-quality dramas. The production also drew attention for casting Phattharapon Dejpongwaranon (Donut) in his first BL role.
