= The Loyal Pin =

2024 Thai television series

- Official series poster
- Also known as: The Loyal Pin : ปิ่นภักดิ์
- Genre: Girls' love; Historical drama; Romantic Drama; Family drama; Melodrama
- Based on: ปิ่นภักดิ์ by MonMaw (ม่อนแมว)
- Written by: Tinna Simapaisal
- Directed by: Kittisak Cheewasatjasakun
- Starring: Rebecca Patricia Armstrong; Sarocha Chankimha
- Country of origin: Thailand
- Original language: Thai
- No. of episodes: 16

Production
- Executive producers: Suppapong Udomkaewkanjana; Kachen Sodpho
- Running time: 60 minutes
- Production company: IDOLFACTORY

Original release
- Network: Workpoint TV; YouTube
- Release: 4 August – 17 November 2024

The Loyal Pin (Thai: ปิ่นภักดิ์ RTGS: Pinphak) is a Thai historical romance television series that premiered on Workpoint TV and the IdolFactory channel on YouTube on 4 August 2024, and ran until 17 November 2024. It stars Rebecca Patricia Armstrong and Sarocha Chankimha. Based on the novel of the same name by MonMaw (ม่อนแมว), the series was written by Tinna Simapaisal, directed by Kittisak Cheewasatjasakun, and produced by IdolFactory.

== Synopsis ==
The series begins in the 1950s; it follows the relationship between Princess Anilaphat (Anin) and Lady Pilantita (Pin), beginning in childhood. By the age of 15, Princess Anin has to pursue her study in England resulting in her leaving her close friend, Lady Pin.

Princess Anin realizes that she has feelings for Lady Pin. By the time she returns to her home country for her brother's engagement, Princess Anin does everything it takes to get close and confess her love to Lady Pin; however Lady Pin is arranged to be married to Master Kueakiat (Kuea).

== Cast and characters ==
=== Main ===
- Rebecca Patricia Armstrong (Becky) as M.C. Anilaphat Sawetawarit / H.S.H. Princess Anilaphat Sawetawarit (Princess Anin)

- Sarocha Chankimha (Freen) as M.R. Pilantita Kasidit (Lady Pin)

=== Supporting ===
- Charm Osathanond as H.S.H. Princess Pattamika Kasidit (Princess Pat)

- Apinan Prasertwattanakul as H.R.H. Prince of the Sawetawarit Palace

- Alicia Hiranprueck as H.S.H. Princess Alisa (Princess Alisa)

- Kanin Stanley as H.S.H. Prince Anantawut Sawetawarit (Prince Anan)

- Danny Luciano as H.S.H. Prince Arnon Sawetawarit (Prince Arnon)

- Chatchawit Techarukpong as M.R. Kueakiat Kankuea (Master Kuea)

- Sarochinee Petampai as M.R. Uangfah Darawan (Lady Uang)

- Asavarid Pinitkanchanapan as M.R. Muangram (Lord Muangram)

- Lalichat Warawirojpol as M.R. Paravati (Lady Vati)

- Neilinyah Taweearayapat as Alisara Sawatdiphat (Aon)

- Tanida Bavornkaisri as Ornida Sawatdiphat (Orn)

- Nuttapart Tuntistianchai as Pranot

- Orntara Poolsak as Prik

- Sutthatip Wutichaipradit as Pia

- Anna Maria Benedic as Koi

=== Guest ===
- Nutthacha Jessica Padovan as Princess Anin (Young)

- Ravinnapa Vannarot as Lady Pin (Young)

- Rudklao Amratisha as H.S.H. Princess Dararai

- Katreeya English as H.R.H. Princess Arbhanumas (Princess Im)

- Phongsakorn Sukiang as Nanmuang

== Production ==
On 18 August 2023, IdolFactory released character images of Armstrong and Chankimha and announced the project as the first Thai GL period drama. Fitting began of all actors on 23 October 2023, and filming started on 20 November 2023. On 28 February 2024, a Memorandum of Understanding (MOU) was signed by the Ministry of Commerce with IdolFactory with the aim to promote Thai goods and services to the international markets through their productions, including The Loyal Pin. Filming wrapped on 11 June 2024.

The Loyal Pin worship ceremony, held at the Workpoint TV headquarters on 30 June 2024, was attended by fans and members of the press. The first official teasers were released on 30 June and 8 July, respectively, and the official trailer was released on 21 July. The Loyal Pin premiere gala, where fans could watch the first episode with the cast, took place on 28 July 2024. The episode then aired on Workpoint TV on 4 August 2024 follow by the uncut version on Idol Factory YouTube Channel.

== Reception ==
In February 2024, Thailand's Ministry of Commerce signed an agreement with IdolFactory to feature Thai community products, services and cultural elements in the series as part of the government's soft power strategy; Commerce Minister Phumtham Wechayachai said the project was expected to generate around 2 billion in value for the Thai economy.

Reviewing the first half of the series for Okazu, a website dedicated to yuri, Erica Friedman called it the best Thai live-action yuri series to date, praising its production values, story and the performances of its leads, while noting that, as part of Thailand's soft power strategy, it presents an idealized view of its fictional royal family.

== Events ==
Year	Day/month	Name	City	Country	Location	Ref.
2024	30 June	The Loyal Pin Worship Ceremony	Pathum Thani (province)	Thailand	Workpoint Entertainment Headquarters	
2024	28 July	The Loyal Pin Gala Premiere	Bangkok	Thailand	MCC Hall The Mall LifeStore Ngamwongwan	
2024	13 October	The Loyal Pin Lantern Night	Bangkok	Thailand	MCC Hall The Mall LifeStore Bangkhae	
2024	17 November	The Loyal Pin Final Episode	Bangkok	Thailand	Siam Pavalai Royal Grand Theatre	
2024	23 November	The Loyal Pin Final Episode	Macau	China	The Venetian L3 Ballroom	

== Episodes Overview ==
No.	Title	Original release date
1	"The Loyal Pin Thai GL No.1"	4 August 2024
Pilantita, also known as Lady Pin is a young girl who has experienced sorrow since childhood as her parents passed away when she was a kid. She is rescued from this sorrow by Princess Anilaphat, a little friend who constantly brings smiles to her face. However, as time goes by Lady Pilantita faces sorrow once again when the king of Sawatwarit family wishes for Princess Anillapat to go studies abroad.
2	"TLP Affection From Afar"	11 August 2024
With the beauty of Khun Pin, Khun Kuea often visited the Palace. However, Khun Pin didn't have any feelings for Khun Kuea. After 5 years, the palace was busy preparing for Prince Anan's engagement, Princess Anin suddenly appeared in the palace, bringing joy to everyone. The happiest of all to see the person she missed was Khun Pin.
3	"Anilpin Blossom Aromatic"	18 August 2024
Aunt Patt reveals to Pin that Anin is only here for a short period and will return to England soon. After returning to the Palace to attend her brother’s engagement, Anin visits Aunt Patt right away in the hope of seeing Khun Pin, the one she misses very much. She then pours out her heart to Khun Pin, but isn’t sure enough if Khun Pin thinks of her as more than friend. Therefore, she plans sth out to make Khun Pin fall for her. Meanwhile, Khun Pin has also developed feelings which she hasn’t realized what they are.
4	"The Loyal Pin French Kiss"	25 August 2024
Anin is still in doubt about Khun Pin’s feelings, leading to get Khun Euangfah involved to prove Khun Pin’s feeling for her. She tries to make Pin jealous by being close to Euangfah,she also planned to let Prik go province with Aunt Patt so that she could be alone with Khun Pin. Additionally, she teaches Khun Pin how to kiss with demonstrating each meaning of it not just through word but practice.
5	"TLP Hairpin of Love"	1 September 2024
Pin seemed confused by Anin's actions and her own feelings, so she had to avoid Anin for several days. Anin falls sick and confessed her love to Pin, but Pin still isn't sure about her feelings for Anin. Anin goes to Phrae to attend her uncle Prince Jakkham's funeral. Pin realises her true feelings. After Anin returns to the palace Pin told that she loved Anin with all her heart. After Anin heard this, she gave Pin a gold hairpin so that she could be paired with her silver hairpin.
6	"Anilpin We Are The One"	8 September 2024
After belonging to each other, Anin and Khun Pin have spent their time in the Pine Palace much happier than before even though Aunt Patt is getting suspicious of their intimacy. However, she brushes it off as both of them have known each other since their youth. Happiness doesn’t last forever as Anin has to return abroad to resume her studies.
7	"The Loyal Pin Kiss Mark"	15 September 2024
After Khun Pin woke up from a nightmare, she found Lady Anin by her side, caring for her closely. The two spent their last night together before Anin had to leave for abroad. Although Khun Pin said she wouldn’t see her off, she still hid behind the bushes to secretly bid her farewell. Both exchanged longing gazes, knowing that they were truly parting. During this trip abroad, Anin encountered Khun Aon, the daughter of the ambassador, who had studied with Anil and Pin since childhood.
8	"TLP Hot Wrist Intertwined"	22 September 2024
Anin returns to Thailand after graduating early. Khun Pin and Anin reunited, they showed their love, affection and burning desire to each other in the Pine Palace. Meanwhile, Anin was very clingy to Khun Pin no matter what she did or where she went. Although Khun Pin blushed, she was comfortable with it because they realized that one may have to get married soon. At the welcoming party, Anin is intoxicated by drinking wine and kisses Pin in the garden while returning to Pine Palace. Prince Anan who was searching for Anin witnesses this
9	"Anilpin Love on the Beach"	29 September 2024
As everyone gathered together at the beach, Master Kuea kept on chasing Khun Pin, but she kept backing off every time. Something unexpected happened to Khun Aon. She had a cramp and almost got drown in the water; Anin performed CPR on her. Such act caused Khun Pin to be secretly jealous and sulking with Anin. Anin well-noticed it, so she came up with every method to reconcile with her. Anin notices the red flags of Kuea as he kicks the tree angrily after Pin rejected to go on a walk with him. The next day, Anin gives Pin a diamond ring and promises to stay by her side forever. While returning Khun Kuea notices the diamong ring on Pin's ring finger causing him to worry about it.
10	"TLP The Secret of Ring"	6 October 2024
After returning from the beach, Khun Kuea was unable to contain his curiosity of the ring on Khun Pin’s finger, so he asked Aunt Patt. She then asked Khun Pin about the origin of the ring. Fortunately, Prince Anan and Prik came to the rescue. However, Aunt Patt’s concern didn’t subside as she was afraid that Khun Pin would encounter the same thing she went through in the past. Anin confessess her relationship with Pin to Prince Anan and he assures her that he wouldn’t forbid the relationship between Anin and Khun Pin since he understood that love couldn’t be forbidden.
11	"The Loyal Pin Lantern Night"	13 October 2024
Anin, Khun Pin and everyone prepared to go to Chiang Mai to represent His Highness to attend a banquet at the Chao Fah Palace. The first night of their arrival, as Khun Pin had to go with Aunt Patt her friendship place, Khun Euangfah took this opportunity to confess her feelings for Anin, but turned out, Anin could only comfort her. In the banquet, Khun Pin performed Candle Dance beautifully with Khun Ueang. While dancing, Khun Ueang kept starring at Anin. Such behavior made Khun Pin more possessive of Anin. Later that night Pin gives Anin a ring. After noticing the kiss mark on Anin's finger Aunt Patt becomes even more suspicious of them.
12	"Anilpin Love Deprivation"	20 October 2024
After returning from Chiang Mai, Aunt Pad became suspicious because she saw Khun Pin and Anin were kissing hands. She then called Prik to interrogate about the truth and found out that the two have a connection deeper than friendship. She forbids Pin from leaving the Bua Palace. Hence, she decided to separate Khun Pin and Anin decisively and arranged for Khun Pin to be engaged to Khun Kuea. As for Anin, after learning everything, she went to intervene with aunt pad and confessed the truth in front of her mother.
13	"TLP Let's Get Back Together"	27 October 2024
Anin threatens to sacrifice her royal title and run way to with Pin to somewhere else if they didn't allow her relationship with Pin. Anin's mother starts to panic, seeing this Pin agrees to marry Kuea and rejects Anin in front of everyone. Anin leaves the hall feeling betrayed by Pin. Anin was angry and didn’t understand Khun Pin’s decision as she had tried everything for their love. Yet, Khun Pin gave up on them easily, which made Anin so heartbroken and hurt that she chose to avoid her. After a few days Pin is engaged to Khun Kuea leaving Anin to find solace in her cousin Euangfah who comforts her.
14	"The Loyal Pin The Key Witness"	3 November 2024
The next day, Pin arrives at the Pine Palace and reveals to Anin that she's only marrying Kuea for names sake and she will be her love. Anin rejects Pin and tells her that she will return to England and will never come back as she can't see Pin with Kuea every day. Anin delves into the situation regarding Kauekiat and discovers that he is a Casanova who already has a pregnant wife, Savitree. Anin confronts Savitree and reveals Kuea's engagement and pleads to stop it. Savitree rejects the pleas of Anin as she is worried about her and her baby's future. Anin then reveals this to Aunt Patt. Despite this revelation, Pattamika refuses to believe Anin remains adamant about proceeding with the wedding. Struggling to come to terms with it, Anin flees to Hua Hin With Aon. At the wedding, Pin is filled with sadness, with tears flowing freely.
15	"Anilpin A Chaotic Wedding"	10 November 2024
The wedding seemed to be going well until Khun Kuea’s pregnant wife came to interrupt it, which shocked everyone. As a result, the wedding was canceled. Aunt Patt deeply regretted that she almost made Khun Pin’s life turn into a living nightmare. Upon knowing the news, Anil hurriedly returned from Hua Hin to her beloved, Khun Pin, without being afraid of any danger that could have happened to her.
16	"The Loyal Pin Final EP"	17 November 2024
Anin decided to ask for permission from her father to marry Khun Pin without getting married, which made His Majesty very displeased. However, due to the steadfast love of the two, along with the persuasion and help from princess Alisa and prince Anan, His Majesty eventually soft-hearted. as time passed, the couple lived happily together and with Nong Alin, the granddaughter who filled the family with warmth.

== Original soundtrack ==
No.	Title	Lyrics	Artist	Length
1.	"Yard Petch" (Thai: หยาดเพชร)	Charlie Intaravichit	Wichayanee Piaklin	4:05
2.	"Until That Day"	Pinpin	Rudklao Amratisha	4:40
3.	"Cheevee"	Pinpin	Sarocha Chankimha; Rebecca Patricia Armstrong	5:07
Total length:				13:52

== Awards and nominations ==
Name of the award ceremony, year presented, category, nominee of the award, and the result of the nomination
Year	Award	Category	Nominated work	Result	Ref.
2024	TPOP STAGE	OST of the Week - Cheevee	Rebecca Patricia Armstrong and Sarocha Chankimha	Won	
2024	BreakTudo Awards 2024	Shipp de Ficção (Fictional Ship) - AnilPin	Rebecca Patricia Armstrong and Sarocha Chankimha	Won	
2024	Y Entertain Awards 2024	Y Couple of the Year	(with Becky Armstrong)	Won	
2024	Y Entertain Awards 2024	Best GL Series of the Year	The Loyal Pin	Nominated	
2024	Y Entertain Awards 2024	Best Production Team of the Year	The Loyal Pin	Nominated	
2024	Y Entertain Awards 2024	Best Girls’ Love Star of the Year	Sarocha Chankimha	Nominated	
2024	Y Entertain Awards 2024	Best Scene of the Year	The Loyal Pin	Won	
2024	Y Entertain Awards 2024	Best Y Series Director of the Year	Kittisak Cheewasatjasakun	Nominated	
2024	Y Entertain Awards 2024	Most Popular Y Novel	Monmaw	Won	
2024	Y Entertain Awards 2024	OST. of the Year	Until That Day	Nominated	
2024	Lesbocine 2024	Biggest Couple	Rebecca Patricia Armstrong and Sarocha Chankimha	Won	
2024	Lesbocine 2024	Icone Sapphic Character	Rebecca Patricia Armstrong	Won	
2025	Sanook Top of the Year Awards 2025	Best Couple of the year	Rebecca Patricia Armstrong and Sarocha Chankimha	Won	
2025	Sanook Top of the Year Awards 2025	Most Popular Series of the Year	The Loyal Pin	Won	
2025	HUB Awards 2024	Series of The Year	The Loyal Pin	Won	
2025	HUB Awards 2024	Chemistry of The Year	Rebecca Patricia Armstrong and Sarocha Chankimha	Won	
2025	HUB Awards 2024	OST of The Year	"Until That Day"	Won	
2025	HUB Awards 2024	Kiss Scene of The Year	The Loyal Pin	Won	
2025	HUB Awards 2024	Dramatic Scene of The Year	The Loyal Pin	Won	
2025	HUB Awards 2024	Opening of The Year	The Loyal Pin	Won	
2025	HUB Awards 2024	Best Production of The Year	The Loyal Pin	Won	
2025	13th Thailand Social Awards	Best Creator Performance on Social Media - (Actor & Actress)	Sarocha Chankimha	2nd place	
2025	13th Thailand Social Awards	Best Creator Performance on Social Media - (Actor & Actress)	Rebecca Patricia Armstrong	2nd place	
2025	13th Thailand Social Awards	Best Content Performance on Social Media - (Series)	The Loyal Pin	Won	
2025	Thailand Box Office Movies & Series Awards 2024	Director Series of The Year	Kittisak Cheewasatjasakun	Nominated	
2025	Thailand Box Office Movies & Series Awards 2024	Original Song Series of The Year	Until That Day	Nominated	
2025	Thailand Box Office Movies & Series Awards 2024	Series of The Year (GL)	The Loyal Pin	Nominated	
2025	Thailand Box Office Movies & Series Awards 2024	Actress Series of The Year	Sarocha Chankimha	Nominated	
2025	Thailand Box Office Movies & Series Awards 2024	Actress Series of The Year	Rebecca Patricia Armstrong	Nominated	
2025	Superstar Idol Awards 2025	Best [Y] Actress	Sarocha Chankimha	Nominated	
2025	Superstar Idol Awards 2025	Superstar Female Couple	Rebecca Patricia Armstrong and Sarocha Chankimha	Nominated	
2025	Superstar Idol Awards 2025	Best [Y] Original Soundtrack	"Cheevee (ชีวี)"	Won	
2025	Superstar Idol Awards 2025	Superstar Best Actress	Sarocha Chankimha	Nominated	
2025	Superstar Idol Awards 2025	Superstar [Y] Director	Kittisak Cheewasatjasakun	Won	
2025	Thai Update Awards 2025	The Best Drama Series of The Year	The Loyal Pin	Nominated	
2025	The Viral Hits Awards 2024	Most Popular Yuri Series of the Year Award	The Loyal Pin	Nominated	
2025	The Viral Hits Awards 2024	Best Yuri Series Couple of the Year Award	Rebecca Patricia Armstrong and Sarocha Chankimha	Nominated	
2025	13th Ganesha Award 2025	The Best Director	Kittisak Cheewasatjasakun	Won	
2025	Kom Chad Luek Awards 2025	Popular Actress	Sarocha Chankimha	Nominated	
2025	Kom Chad Luek Awards 2025	Popular Actress	Rebecca Patricia Armstrong	Nominated	
2025	Kom Chad Luek Awards 2025	Popular Couple	(with Becky Armstrong)	Won	
2025	Kazz Awards 2025	Series of The Year	The Loyal Pin	Won	
2025	Kazz Awards 2025	Popular Female Teenage Award	Sarocha Chankimha	Won	
2025	Kazz Awards 2025	The Best Actress of The Year	Rebecca Patricia Armstrong	Won	
2025	Kazz Awards 2025	Superstar Award	Sarocha Chankimha	Won	
2025	Kazz Awards 2025	Couple of The Year	Rebecca Patricia Armstrong and Sarocha Chankimha	Won	
2025	Thai GL Awards Japan 2025	Best Couple Award	Rebecca Patricia Armstrong and Sarocha Chankimha	Won	
2025	Thai GL Awards Japan 2025	Best Work Award	The Loyal Pin	Won	
2025	Thai GL Awards Japan 2025	Best Music Award	"Cheevee (ชีวี)"	Won	
2025	Thai GL Awards Japan 2025	Best Episode Award	Episode 9	Won	
2025	Bangkok Pride Awards 2025	Pride Popular of Series / Drama	The Loyal Pin	Nominated	
2025	Bangkok Pride Awards 2025	Pride Popular of Sapphic Series Star	Rebecca Patricia Armstrong and Sarocha Chankimha	Nominated	
2025	Thailand Y Content Awards 2024	Popular Vote	Sarocha Chankimha	Nominated	
2025	Thailand Y Content Awards 2024	Popular Vote	Rebecca Patricia Armstrong	Won	
2025	Thailand Y Content Awards 2024	Best series	The Loyal Pin	Nominated	
2025	Thailand Y Content Awards 2024	Best Leading Actress	Sarocha Chankimha	Nominated	
2025	Thailand Y Content Awards 2024	Best Director	Kittisak Cheewasatjasakun	Nominated	
2025	Thailand Y Content Awards 2024	Best Cinematography	The Loyal Pin	Nominated	
2025	Thailand Y Content Awards 2024	Best Art Direction	The Loyal Pin	Nominated	
2025	Thailand Y Content Awards 2024	Best Series Screenplay	The Loyal Pin	Nominated	
2025	Thailand Y Content Awards 2024	Best Thai Cultural Promotion	The Loyal Pin	Nominated	
2025	Thailand Y Content Awards 2024	Best Costume Design	The Loyal Pin	Nominated	
2025	Thailand Y Content Awards 2024	Couple of the Year	Rebecca Patricia Armstrong and Sarocha Chankimha	Won	
2025	SEC Awards 2025 (Brazil)	Asian Series	The Loyal Pin	Won	
2025	SEC Awards 2025 (Brazil)	Favorite Couple	Rebecca Patricia Armstrong and Sarocha Chankimha	Won	
2025	SEC Awards 2025 (Brazil)	Asian Series Performance	Freen Sarocha	Won	
2025	FEED X KHAOSOD Awards 2025	Popular Actress Award	Rebecca Patricia Armstrong	Won	
2025	FEED X KHAOSOD Awards 2025	Best Chemistry	Rebecca Patricia Armstrong and Sarocha Chankimha	Nominated	
2025	FEED X KHAOSOD Awards 2025	Popular drama series	The Loyal Pin	Nominated	
2025	FEED X KHAOSOD Awards 2025	Top-Tier GL Series of the Year	The Loyal Pin	Nominated	
2025	FEED X KHAOSOD Awards 2025	Director Girl's love of the Year	Kittisak Cheewasatjasakun	Nominated	
2025	FEED X KHAOSOD Awards 2025	Actress Girl's love of the Year	Sarocha Chankimha	Nominated	
2025	FEED X KHAOSOD Awards 2025	Couple of the Year	Rebecca Patricia Armstrong and Sarocha Chankimha	Nominated	
2025	Howe Awards 2025	Howe Hottest Actress Award	Freen Sarocha	Nominated	
2025	Howe Awards 2025	Hottest The Best Couple Award	Rebecca Patricia Armstrong and Sarocha Chankimha	Nominated	
2025	Howe Awards 2025	Howe Hottest Series Award	The Loyal Pin	Nominated	
2025	BreakTudo Awards 2025 (Brazil)	GL Series of the Year	The Loyal Pin	Won	
2025	BreakTudo Awards 2025 (Brazil)	Crush International	Freen Sarocha	Won	

Won	40
Nominated	38
Total Nominations	78

*Few private voting based recognitions are not mentioned here.

== Listicles ==
Year	Publisher	Listicle	Character/Artist	Nominated work	Placement	Ref.
2024	Lesbocine	Top Sapphic characters	Anil	Rebecca Patricia Armstrong	1st place	
2024	Lesbocine	Top Sapphic characters	Pin	Sarocha Chankimha	3rd place	
2024	Lesbocine	Biggest Couple of 2024	AnilPin	Rebecca Patricia Armstrong and Sarocha Chankimha	1st place	
2025	Lesbocine	Top Sapphic characters	Anil	Rebecca Patricia Armstrong	2nd place	
2025	Lesbocine	Top Sapphic characters	Pin	Sarocha Chankimha	4th place	
