= Rudklao Amratisha =

Thai singer, actress and voice actress (born 1969)

- รัดเกล้า อามระดิษ
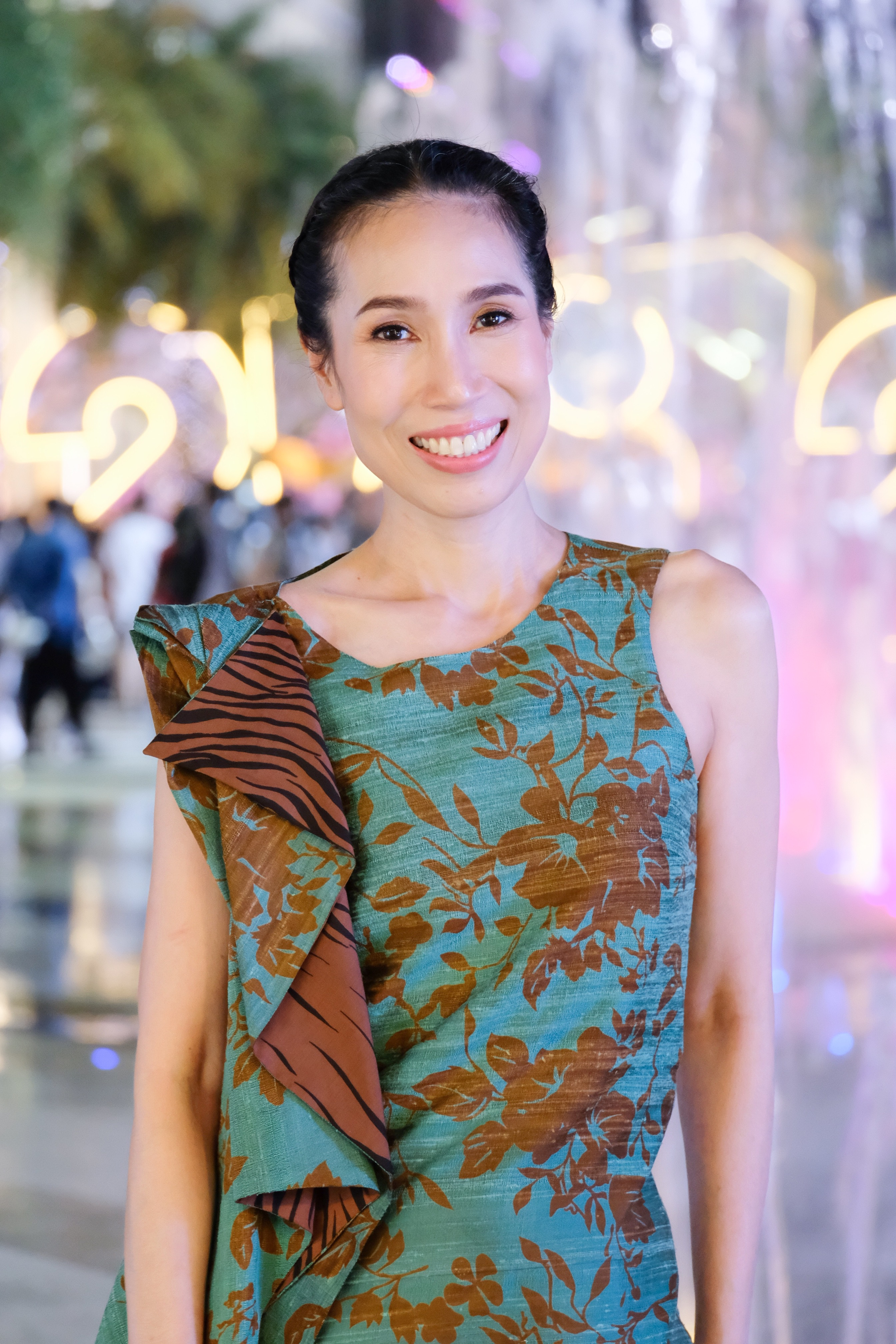
- Born: 16 October 1969 (age 56); Bangkok, Thailand
- Other name: Tungneng (ต๊งเหน่ง)
- Occupations: Singer; actress; voice actress
- Years active: 1992–present
- Awards: Kom Chad Luek Award for Best Actress (2015); Nataraj Award for Best Actress (2015); Bangkok Critics Assembly Award for Best Supporting Actress (2011)

Rudklao Amratisha (Thai: รัดเกล้า อามระดิษ; born 16 October 1969), nicknamed Tungneng (Thai: ต๊งเหน่ง), is a Thai singer, actress and voice actress. As a singer, she is known for songs such as "Lom Haijai" (Breath), "Prode Thoe" (Please) and "Bep Mue" (Squeeze Hand). In film, she won the Bangkok Critics Assembly Award for Best Supporting Actress in 2011 for the film The Outrage (อุโมงค์ผาเมือง). On television, she won the Nataraja Awards for Best Actress in 2015 for the drama Sud Kaen Saen Rak (สุดแค้นแสนรัก). She is also the official voice of the announcements on the BTS Skytrain system in Bangkok.

== Filmography ==
=== Television ===
Year	Title	Role	Network
1999	Bangoei Ruay Chuay Mai Dai (บังเอิญรวยช่วยไม่ได้)	Nid (นิด)	Channel 5
2000	Khu Rak Khu Rop (คู่รักคู่รบ)	—	Channel 5
2002	Bua Klang Bueng (บัวกลางบึง)	—	Channel 7
2002	Sam Wai Alaweng (สามวัยอลเวง)	Gina (จีน่า)	Channel 7
2011	Kham We La Ha Rak (ข้ามเวลาหารัก)	Oboon (โอบอรุณ)	Channel 5
2012	Jud Nud Pop (จุดนัดภพ)	Suwimon (สุวิมล)	Channel 3
2013	Khun Chai Tharathon (คุณชายธราธร)	Sophee (โสภี)	Channel 3
2013	Eesa Rawee Chong Chot (อีสา-รวีช่วงโชติ)	Sumruay (สำรวย)	Channel 5
2014	7 Mongkut (7 มงกุฎ)	Khun Ying Nopnapha (คุณหญิงนพนภา)	Channel 7
2015	7 Wan Jong Woen (7 วันจองเวร)	Rampha (รัมภา)	Workpoint TV
2015	Krob Krua Tueang Nuead Tuead Kao (ครอบครัวตึ๋งหนืดตืดขั้นเทพ)	Je Mad (เจ๊หมัด)	Channel 7
2015	Sud Kaen Saen Rak (สุดแค้นแสนรัก)	Yaem Munkij (แย้ม หมั่นกิจ)	Channel 3
2016	I See You (I See You พยาบาลพิเศษ..เคสพิศวง)	S.J. Nun (ส.จ. นุ่น)	GMM25
2016	MelodiesOf Life – My Name Is Single (MelodiesOfLife ตอน My Name Is Single คนไม่มีแฟน)	Eve Sang (อีฟแซง)	GMM25
2016	Rao Koet Nai Ratchakhan Thi 9 The Series (เราเกิดในรัชกาลที่ ๙ เดอะซีรีส์)	Citizen (ประชาชน)	One 31
2017	The One You Are My Destiny (เธอคือพรหมลิขิต)	Bangon (บังอร)	One 31
2017	La (ล่า)	Sensei Yuki (เซ็นเซยูกิ)	One 31
2017	Sri Ayodhya (ศรีอโยธยา)	Krom Muen Phimol Phakdi / Prof. M.L. Phuangkaew Uthaiwong (กรมหมื่นพิมลภักดี / ศาสตราจารย์ หม่อมหลวง พวงแก้ว อุทัยวงศ์)	True4U
2017	Duean Pradap Dao (เดือนประดับดาว)	Khun Ying Chonlada (คุณหญิงชลลดา)	Channel 3
2018	Khun Chai Kai Tong (คุณชายไก่โต้ง)	Xiu Jin / Yi Jin (ซิ่วจิน / อี๊จิน)	Channel 7
2018	Kalom Mahorathuek (กาหลมหรทึก)	Pa On (ป้าอร)	One 31
2018	Saneh Nang Khruan (เสน่ห์นางครวญ)	Nom Kham (นมขาม)	Channel 8
2018	Bangkok Rak Stories – Innocence @ Silom (Bangkok รัก Stories ตอน Innocence ไม่เดียงสา @สีลม)	Mae Simon (แม่ไซม่อน)	GMM25
2019	Thong Aek Mor Ya Tha Chalong (ทองเอก หมอยา ท่าโฉลง)	Mae Mom Man (แม่หมอมั่น)	Channel 3
2019	Krong Kam (กรงกรรม)	Yaem Munkij (แย้ม หมั่นกิจ) (guest)	Channel 3
2019	Wai Saep Sa Haek Khad – Project 2 (วัยแสบสาแหรกขาด โครงการ 2)	Kru Phannee Jitthiangtham (ครูพรรณี จิตเที่ยงธรรม)	Channel 3
2019	Nang Mar (นางมาร)	Sommalee (โสมมาลี)	GMM25
2019	Montra Maha Saneh (มนตรามหาเสน่ห์)	Phutson / Pa Chub (พุดซ้อน/ป้าชุบ)	PPTV
2019	Phadukat (ภาตุฆาต)	Napha (นภา)	One 31
2019	Plerng Rak Plerng Kaen (เพลิงรักเพลิงแค้น)	Duangmal (ดวงมาลย์)	Channel 3
2019	Tee Khrai Tee Man (Teeใครทีมันส์)	Metta (เมตตา)	Channel 3
2019	Dao Long Fah (ดาวหลงฟ้า)	Maen Khian (แม้นเขียน)	Channel 3
2019	Plai Chawak (ปลายจวัก)	Khun Krun (คุณกรุ่น)	Thai PBS
2019	Sri Ayodhya 2 (ศรีอโยธยา 2)	Krom Muen Phimol Phakdi / Prof. M.L. Phuangkaew Uthaiwong	True4U
2021	Girl2K (สาวออฟฟิศ 2000 ปี)	Kanyao (ก้านยาว)	GMM25
2021	Let's Eat – Rak Lon Poong (Let's Eat รักล้นพุง)	Je Run (เจ๊รัน)	True Asian Series HD / Netflix / True4U
2021	Bite Me – Song Ron Serf Rak (Bite Me ส่งร้อนเสิร์ฟรัก)	Mae Nuan (แม่นวล)	One 31
2021	Phruetsapha Thanwa Rak Thae Kert Kon (พฤษภา-ธันวา รักแท้แค่เกิดก่อน)	Chan Kapho (Sis Chan / Madame J) (จันทร์กะพ้อ (ซิสจันทร์ / มาดามเจ))	Channel 3
2021	Sut Leh Sanae Ha (สูตรเล่ห์เสน่หา)	Fongkaew (ฟองแก้ว)	Channel 8
2021	Phra Chan Daeng (พระจันทร์แดง)	Pa Eueang (ป้าเอื้อง)	One 31
2022	Tai La (ใต้หล้า)	Suay (สวย)	One 31
2022	The Broken Us Na Khana Ngao (The broken us ณ ขณะเหงา)	Je Miang (เจ๊เมี่ยง)	Thai PBS
2023	Nang Nak Sapai Phra Khanong (นางนาคสะใภ้พระโขนง)	Mae Muean (แม่เหมือน)	Workpoint TV
2023	House of Stars (สถาบันปั้นดาว)	Suzy (ซูซี่)	One 31
2023	Wongsa Khana Yati (วงศาคณาญาติ)	Pa Yai (Nuan) (ป้าใหญ่ (นวล))	Amarin TV
2023	Butsaba Lui Fai (บุษบาลุยไฟ)	Mae Thawai (แม่ทวาย)	Thai PBS
2023	Phuean Phan Mi Moradok Pen Homstay Khrap – Escape to Homestay (เพื่อนผมมีมรดกเป็นโฮมสเตย์ครับ Escape to Homestay)	Ya Thap (ยายทับ)	Channel 9
2023	Phrom Likhit (พรหมลิขิต)	Ya Kui (ยายกุย)	Channel 3
2023	Chi Wit Phak Song (ชีวิตภาคสอง)	Wan Dee (วันดี)	One 31
2024	Rot Rang Thieo Sut Thai (รถรางเที่ยวสุดท้าย)	Bunga (บุหงา)	Thai PBS
2024	Beating Again – Khyap Huachai Ma Sai Jungwa (Beating Again ขยับหัวใจมาใส่จังหวะ)	A Ko Hua (อาโกวฮัว)	Thai PBS
2024	The Loyal Pin (ปิ่นภักดิ์)	Mom Chao Ying Dararai (หม่อมเจ้าหญิงดาราราย) (guest)	Workpoint TV
2024	Khatakam The Musical (ฆาตกรรม The Musical)	Nong Phanga (นงพะงา)	Mono Max
2024	Mom Pet Sawan (หม่อมเป็ดสวรรค์)	Khun Thao Worachan (คุณท้าววรจันทร์) (guest)	Thai PBS
2025	Ruedu Long Pa – Lost In The Woods (ฤดูหลงป่า Lost In The Woods)	Ya Pat (ย่าปัด)	Viu
2025	Sam Sao Khok I Raeng (สามสาวโคกอีแร้ง)	Ya Nian (ยายเนียน)	Channel 3
2025	Rak Mai Loek (รักไม่เลิก)	Psychiatrist (จิตแพทย์หญิง)	Thai PBS
2025	A(ir) Moment – Okat Akat (A(ir) Moment โอกาส อากาศ)	Ananke (อนันเก้)	Channel 9
2025	Krai Nai Krachok – Mystique in the Mirror (ใครในกระจก)	Khun Si (คุณศิ)	iQIYI
2026	My Romance Scammer (รักจริงหลังแต่ง)	Nath (นาถ)	GMM25
2026	Klin Malee (กลิ่นมาลี)	Khun Ying Bua Kaew (คุณหญิงบัวแก้ว)	One 31
2026	BROKEN (Of) LOVE – Hua Jai Cham Rak (BROKEN (Of) LOVE หัวใจช้ำรัก)	Ruchee (รุวจี)	YouTube (Fabel Entertainment)
2026	Rak Dai Rue Young (รักได้หรือ young)	Thien See (เทียนสี)	Channel 3
2027	Butsaba Taklee (บุษบาตาคลี)	Phan Rai (พรรณราย)	Channel 3

== Awards ==
- Bangkok Critics Assembly Award (20th edition, 2011) – Best Supporting Actress for The Outpost (อุโมงค์ผาเมือง) (2012)
- Siamdara Star Awards 2015 – Best Villain (ร้ายได้ใจ) for Sud Kaen Saen Rak (สุดแค้นแสนรัก) (2015)
- Colorful Entertainment Award 2015 – Best Actress for Sud Kaen Saen Rak (สุดแค้นแสนรัก) (2015)
- Kom Chad Luek Award (13th edition) – Best Actress (TV) for Sud Kaen Saen Rak (สุดแค้นแสนรัก) (2016)
- MThai Top Talk-About 2016 – Most Talked About Actress for Sud Kaen Saen Rak (สุดแค้นแสนรัก) (2016)
- Howe Awards 2015 – Popular Award (ขวัญใจมหาชน) for Sud Kaen Saen Rak (สุดแค้นแสนรัก) (2016)
- Nataraj Award (7th edition) – Best Actress for Sud Kaen Saen Rak (สุดแค้นแสนรัก) (2016)
- Golden "Khanes Mayure Suwan" Award (1st edition) – Best Supporting Actress for Sri Ayodhya (ศรีอโยธยา) Part 1 (2018)
- "Good Person of Rattanakosin" Award – Outstanding Artist-Actor (2018)
- "Rassad Bundit" Award (Good People, Talented People of Thailand) – Best Actress for Sri Ayodhya (ศรีอโยธยา) (2018)
- "Royal Society of Thailand Appreciation" Award – Outstanding Use of Thai Language for Mantra Maha Saneh (มนตรามหาเสน่ห์) (2020)
- Outstanding Use of Thai Language Award (National Thai Language Day) from the Department of Cultural Promotion (2021)
- Nataraj Award (16th edition) – Best Supporting Actress (Online Platform) for The Musical Murder (ฆาตกรรม The Musical) (2025)
