= House of Stars =

Thai BL television series (2023)

- สถาบันปั้นดาว
- Genre: BL; Drama; Mystery
- Directed by: Art Anan Rasamee (อานันท์ รัศมี)
- Starring: Rudklao Amratisha; Nutchapan Paramacharenroj; Sirapob Pratipnatsir; Pornpipat Kunisorn; Akaravin Nanthipat; Tupthep Jiraprasertkon; Thatpong Rojsangruang; Thanon Apithanawong; Ponchanok Theerawan; Niranara Insao; Nannapas Suzuki
- Country of origin: Thailand
- Original language: Thai
- No. of seasons: 1
- No. of episodes: 12

Production
- Producer: Kraipich Tassanasilp (ไกรพิชญ์ ทัศนาแสงสูรย์)
- Running time: 45 minutes
- Production companies: Star Halo Entertainment; One 31; iQIYI

Original release
- Network: One 31; iQIYI
- Release: 1 May – 17 July 2023

House of Stars (Thai: สถาบันปั้นดาว) is a Thai boys' love (BL) television series with drama and mystery elements, aired from 1 May to 17 July 2023. It features an ensemble cast including Rudklao Amratisha, Nutchapan Paramacharenroj (Pepo), Sirapob Pratipnatsir (Leo), and Pornpipat Kunisorn (Boss), among others. Directed by Art Anan Rasamee and produced by Kraipich Tassanasilp (Star Halo Entertainment), the series is a co-production of Star Halo Entertainment with channel One 31 and platform iQIYI.

The series aired weekly on Mondays at 23:00 on One 31, with an extended (UNCUT) version released at midnight on iQIYI.

== Synopsis ==
Suzy (Rudklao Amratisha) is a powerful businesswoman in the Thai entertainment industry. She created "House of Stars" – a mansion where she gathers the most successful artists from her agency, all living under one roof. The house has strict rules: no romantic relationships between colleagues, mandatory curfew, and a prohibition on causing any kind of trouble.

Among the residents are Gun (Pepo), the country's biggest superstar; the popular fan couple Pitch (Leo) and So (Boss); the real-life couple Korn (New) and Mintra (Oaey); and the newcomers Pawin (Double), Wayha (Heng) and Wayu (Namchok). Despite the glamour and cameras, each one carries dark secrets – repressed desires, hidden ambitions, and forbidden relationships.

When a mysterious young man appears at the mansion calling Suzy "mother," buried truths begin to surface. The series explores the dark backstage of the entertainment industry, where no one is completely innocent.

== Cast ==
=== Main ===
- Rudklao Amratisha (Rudklao) as Suzy
- Nutchapan Paramacharenroj (Pepo) as Gun
- Sirapob Pratipnatsir (Leo) as Pitch
- Pornpipat Kunisorn (Boss) as So
- Akaravin Nanthipat (New) as Korn
- Ponchanok Theerawan (Oaey) as Mintra
- Tupthep Jiraprasertkon (Double) as Pawin
- Thatpong Rojsangruang (Heng) as Wayha
- Thanon Apithanawong (Namchok) as Wayu
- Niranara Insao (Katang) as Lalit
- Nannapas Suzuki (Mie) as Host

=== Recurring ===
- Korn Nattawat Rachatanich (Korn) as Sin

== Production ==
The series was announced as a partnership between Star Halo Entertainment, One 31, and iQIYI. The press conference ("Sit Down Launch") was held at L'ensemble Studio, one of the filming locations, with the full cast and executives in attendance. Director Art Anan Rasamee led the production. Producer Kraipich Tassanasilp stated that the series aims to show that "no one is completely white or black, but everyone lives in gray areas." The series marked the first BL role for several actors, including Rudklao Amratisha (known for her roles in traditional dramas) and young actors Heng Thatpong and Namchok Thanon.

== Release ==
The series premiered on 1 May 2023 on One 31 (Mondays at 23:00) and simultaneously on iQIYI (UNCUT version at midnight). The final episode aired on 17 July 2023, totaling 12 episodes of approximately 45 minutes each. iQIYI promoted the series as part of its original catalog, offering Full HD resolution and Dolby Atmos sound for subscribers.

== Reception ==
The first episodes generated buzz on social media, with the hashtag #HouseOfStars trending in Thailand. The press highlighted Rudklao Amratisha's performance as Suzy, praising her dramatic intensity.

Critics noted that the series stands out for addressing more mature themes such as betrayal, excessive ambition, and the psychological pressures of fame. Episode 8, which reveals the family relationship between Suzy and Host, was considered one of the season's highlights. On iQIYI, the series achieved a rating of 6.9/10 with over 6,900 user ratings.

== Accolades ==
=== Listicles ===
Listicle appearances for House of Stars
Critic/Publication	List	Rank	Ref.
Sanook	Popular Thai BL and GL Series of 2023–2024	Included	
TrueID Entertainment	12 BL Series Worth Watching	7	
