= Narikun Ketprapakorn =

Thai actress (born 1997)

- นรีกุล เกตุประภากร
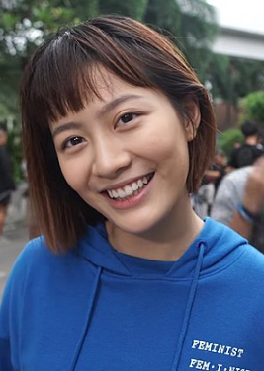
- Narikun in 2018
- Born: July 26, 1997 (age 29); Bangkok, Thailand
- Other name: Frung
- Education: Chulalongkorn University – Faculty of Medicine
- Occupations: Actress; model; medical student
- Years active: 2014–present
- Agent: Nadao Bangkok (2014–2022)
- Known for: Oil
- Notable work: Hormones: The Series
- Relatives: Ponlawit Ketprapakorn (brother)

Narikun Ketprapakorn (Thai: นรีกุล เกตุประภากร; born 26 July 1997), nicknamed Frung (Thai: ฟรัง), is a Thai actress. She is known as Oil in Thai series, Hormones.

== Biography ==
Narikun was born in Bangkok and has 2 younger brothers. She is the eldest sister of Ponlawit Ketprapakorn (Pond), a Thai actor. She graduated grade and secondary school at Saint Joseph Convent school and Triam Udom Suksa School respectively. She was an emcee in the game show, Are You Smarter Than Elementary Students? in her 6th grade. She is currently studying in Faculty of Medicine at the Chulalongkorn University.

In 2013, she won the 5th Utip Freshy Idol contest and received the photogenic model award. She soon became a commercial model. Narikun has been selected as cast in the second season of Hormones: The Series after finishing up Top 6 in the reality show project "Hormones The Next Gen".

== Filmography ==
=== Film ===
Year	Title	Role	Notes
2015	May Who?	Wikanda (Mink)	

=== Television series ===
Year	Title	Role	Network	Notes
2014	Hormones: The Series season 2	Arrol Suwisutkomol (Oil)	GMM 25	
2014	ThirTEEN Terrors	Wan	GTH On Air	Poo Som episode
2015	Stupid Cupid The Series	Ang Kab	GMM 25	Cameo
2015	Hormones: The Series season 3	Arrol Suwisutkomol (Oil)	ONE 31	
2016	Love Songs Love Series	Ketprapakorn Narikun (Ting)	GMM 25	Khob Khun Thi Ruk Kun
2016	I am bright	bright	Youtube	Short movie ads, clean & clear
2017	Love Songs Love Series To Be Continued	Ketprapakorn Narikun (Ting)	GMM 25	Khob Khun Thi Ruk Kun
2017	Project S The Series	Bo	GMM 25	Shoot! I Love You
2019	Great Men Academy	Rose	Line tv	
2020	Win 21 Ded Jai Tur	Bella	Line tv	
2020	Quarantine Stories	Bam	GMM 25	Ep:8

=== TV Show ===
- 2008 Are You Smarter Than Elementary Students?
- 2014 Hormones The Next Gen
- 2015 Frozen Hormones
- 2016 Hangover Thailand 2016

=== Music video ===
- 2014 Arb Nam Ron - Big Ass
- 2015 Yorn - Slot Machine
- 2016 Tua Pun Ha - Fymme Bongkot
- 2017 Neptune - Gesplanet
- 2017 Aitakatta (Ost. Shoot! I Love You) - BNK48
- 2018 เพื่อนไม่รัก - Foam

=== Concert ===
- 2015 STAR THEQUE GTH 11 ปีแสง

== Awards ==
- 2013 5th Utip Freshy Idol contest : The Winner and The Photogenic Model
- 2014 Daradaily The Great Awards : The Rising Star Actress
- 2015 MThai Top Talk-About : Top Talk-About Memorable Character
