= Girl2K =

2021 Thai television series

- Official series poster
- Thai: สาวออฟฟิศ 2000 ปี
- Genre: Romantic comedy; Fantasy; Mystery
- Directed by: Pawis Sowsrion
- Starring: Sushar Manaying; Pathompong Reonchaidee; Jumpol Adulkittiporn
- Opening theme: "โดดออกมารัก (Take a Risk)" by Katreeya English
- Country of origin: Thailand
- Original language: Thai
- No. of episodes: 10

Production
- Running time: 45 minutes
- Production company: GMMTV

Original release
- Network: GMM 25; Line TV
- Release: 17 February – 18 March 2021

Girl2K (Thai: สาวออฟฟิศ 2000 ปี; RTGS: Sao Offit 2000 Pi) is a Thai television series starring Sushar Manaying (Aom), Pathompong Reonchaidee (Toy), and Jumpol Adulkittiporn (Off). Produced by GMMTV and directed by Pawis Sowsrion (Film), it was announced as one of the television series of GMMTV for 2020 during their "GMMTV2020: NEW & NEXT" event held on October 15, 2019. It officially premiered on GMM 25 and Line TV on February 17, 2021, and ran until March 18, 2021.

== Synopsis ==
Momay (Aom Sushar), a charming short story writer for the popular online magazine The Year, has a youthful appearance that leads everyone to believe she is only 25 years old despite actually being a 2,000-year-old immortal. Her endless and solitary existence has become a living hell, where the only way to break her immortality curse is to find true love. She encounters four potential suitors: her innocent neighbor Kampun (Fiat Patchata), her highly accomplished boss Tawin (Off Jumpol), a flirtatious client Mr. Prom (Utt Panichkul), and a handsome new journalist Moo-Tod (Toy Pathompong). However, her search for romance is complicated by a dark mystery involving the murder of a withered woman. As Momay searches for her soulmate among these four candidates, she must also uncover whether her true love is connected to or perhaps even the criminal behind the crime.

== Cast and characters ==
=== Main ===
- Sushar Manaying (Aom) as Momay
- Pathompong Reonchaidee (Toy) as Moo-Tod
- Jumpol Adulkittiporn (Off) as Tawin

=== Supporting ===
- Patchata Janngeon (Fiat) as Kampun
- Uttsada Panichkul (Utt) as Mr. Prom
- Rudklao Amratisha (Tungneng) as Kanyao
- Chaleumpol Tikumpornteerawong (Jack) as Oab
- Passakorn Ponlaboon (Fern) as Jelly
- Kornrawich Sungkitbool (Junior) as Krating

=== Guest ===
- Suporn Sangkaphibal (Nui) as Mrs. Chailai / Jisoo (Ep. 1)
- Panomrekha Potiticka (Nom) as Ning (Ep. 1)
- Ploynira Hiruntaveesin (Kapook) as Punpun (Ep. 1–2)
- Darina Boonchu (Nancy) as Dao (Ep. 2)
- Jirawat Wachirasarunpat (War) as hotel manager (Ep. 2–3)
- Sutthipha Kongnawdee (Noon) as Mr. Prom's fling (Ep. 2, 5)
- Anna Chuanchyn as policeman (Ep. 3)
- Suttathip Wutchaipradit (Ampere) as insurance saleswoman (Ep. 3)
- Nitiwadee Tamnyantrong (Tan) as Jah (Ep. 4)
- Parassara Dejkraisak (Frappe) as Pimrose (Ep. 8)
- Chayanit Boonsopit (Eve) as Junejune (Ep. 8)
- Tawan Vihokratana (Tay) as Matt (Ep. 8–10)
- Sirapob Patomkanbuth (Ampere) as young Matt (Ep. 9)
- Ratchata Pichetshote (Maxky) as nurse (Ep. 10)
- Ravipon Pumruang (Aea) as host (Ep. 10)

== Soundtrack ==
Song title	Artist	Ref.
โดดออกมารัก (Take a Risk)	Katreeya English	
