= Be My Player Two =

- Official poster
- ซอโซ่ล่ามธีร์
- Genre: Boys' love; Romantic comedy; Esports
- Directed by: New Siwaj Sawatmaneekul
- Starring: Maxky Ratchata Pichetshote; Suradet Piniwat (Bas); Jeng Chotipat Suthadsanasoung; Mean Wichayaporn Jiravechsoontornkul; Gunner Natsakan Chairote; Jay Sorathon Chaloemlapsombut; Ben Benjamin Greenwell; Jack Chaleumpol Tikumpornteerawong; Euro Waratthip Kittiphaisan
- Country of origin: Thailand
- Original language: Thai
- No. of seasons: 1
- No. of episodes: 10

Original release
- Network: WeTV

Be My Player Two (th:ซอโซ่ล่ามธีร์) is an upcoming Thai boys' love romantic comedy television series centered on the world of esports. Produced by Studio Wabi Sabi for WeTV, the series is directed by New Siwaj Sawatmaneekul and stars Ratchata Pichetshote (Maxky) and Suradet Piniwat (Bas).

The series is scheduled to premiere on 16 July 2026 on WeTV, which will stream the international uncut version.

== Synopsis ==
The series follows Thi (THR33), a well-known livestreamer famous for his competitive personality and sharp tongue. During one of his livestreams, he is unexpectedly defeated by Zo (DERYA MK12), an unknown newcomer to the competitive gaming scene.

What begins as Thi's determination to track down and defeat his mysterious rival gradually develops into an unexpected romance. As they pursue their dream of competing professionally in esports, Thi and Zo must navigate intense competition, the pressures of their gaming careers, and the feelings growing between them, discovering that some connections cannot simply be reset like a video game.

== Cast ==
=== Main ===
- Ratchata Pichetshote (Maxky) as Thi / THR33
- Suradet Piniwat (Bas)as Zo / DERYA MK12

=== Supporting ===
- Chotipat Suthadsanasoung (Jeng) as Cher / CHERISH
- Wichayaporn Jiravechsoontornkul (Mean) as Praew / PREAWPREAW
- Natsakan Chairote (Gunner) as Jack / JJACK
- Waiyakorn Wongkhakaew (Newton)
- Jay Sorathon Chaloemlapsombut as Arm
- Ben Benjamin Greenwell as James
- Jack Chaleumpol Tikumpornteerawong as Tubtab
- Euro Waratthip Kittiphaisan as Four

== Production ==
The series was officially announced on 6 November 2025 during the WeTV Always More 2026 event held in Bangkok.

Produced by Studio Wabi Sabi under the supervision of WeTV Thailand, the series is based on the novel เกมเมอร์และน้องเด๋อของเขา and was developed in collaboration with Garena Online (Thailand), the publisher of Arena of Valor (RoV), which serves as the backdrop for the story.

Principal photography began after a traditional blessing ceremony held on 20 February 2026 at the Ganesha Shrine in Union Mall, Bangkok. The ceremony was attended by director New Siwaj Sawatmaneekul, representatives from WeTV Thailand, Studio Wabi Sabi, Garena Online (Thailand), and the main cast.

== Release ==
The series' first concept trailer was unveiled during the WeTV Always More 2026 event in November 2025, confirming the production and introducing Maxky Ratchata Pichetshote and Bas Hatsanat Piniwat as the lead actors.

On 18 June 2026, WeTV officially announced that the series would premiere on 16 July 2026. The platform also confirmed that the international uncut version would be available exclusively through its streaming service.

As part of the promotional campaign, WeTV and Garena organized several events centered around Arena of Valor (RoV), including livestreams in which the cast appeared as their respective characters and competed against members of the public.
