= Nine (singer) =

Thai singer (born 1999)

- กรชิต บุญสถิต์ภักดี
- Born: 11 July 1999 (age 27); Bangkok, Thailand
- Other names: Gao Qingchen, Nine, Little Nine, Xiao Jiu, Nai
- Education: Assumption University Roong Aroon School
- Occupations: Actor; singer; host
- Years active: 2019–present
- Agent: Insight Entertainment
- Height: 1.75 m (5 ft 9 in)
- Musical career
- Genres: Pop; Mandopop; T-pop
- Instruments: Keyboard; acoustic guitar
- Label: Gao Qingchen Studio
- Formerly of: OXQ; Into1

Chinese name
- Traditional Chinese: 高卿塵
- Simplified Chinese: 高卿尘
Transcriptions
Standard Mandarin
- Hanyu Pinyin: Gāo Qīngchén
- Website: https://m.weibo.cn/u/5627362571?luicode=10000011&lfid=1005055627362571

Kornchid Boonsathipakdee or Gao Qingchen (Thai: กรชิต บุญสถิต์ภักดี; simplified Chinese: 高卿尘; traditional Chinese: 高卿塵; pinyin: Gāo Qīngchén, born 11 July 1999), more commonly known as Nine (Thai: นาย) is a Thai artist. He made his acting debut in 2019 as kit in the Thai boys' love television series 2 Moons 2. He is the fifth member of the former multi-national Chinese boy group Into1 that debuted in the reality survival show Produce Camp 2021.

== Career ==
Nine made his acting debut in 2019 with the role of Mongkol 'Kit' Intochar in the second season of 2 Moons 2.

On 11 January 2021, it was confirmed that Nine would participate in the Chinese survival show Produce Camp 2021, under Insight Entertainment. In the Audition Stage, Nine introduced himself under his Chinese name Gao Qingchen and his nickname Xiao Jiu. He and Patrick Finkler performed 'Me and My Broken Heart'. At the extra round, he was asked to perform a song; he sang "Happiness". In the First Stage, Nine performed the song "Yummy". During the Second Stage Performance, Nine joined the group who would sing "You Better Not Think About Me". After the performance, the group also performed "Unbreakable Love" at the behest of the judges and his groupmate Yu Gengyin. Their group lost by a slim margin. Nine won the MVP of their group and won the Super MVP with fellow Into1 singer Liu Zhang "AK". On the Third Stage, he performed the opening stage with the other Super MVP and his team. They performed the song "Happy". Nine chose to join the Push No. 5 for Cute Input Method group. At the Debut Night Stage, Nine performed "Sun" and "We Are The Youth".

== Filmography ==
=== Television series ===
Year	Title	Role	Note	Ref.
2019	2 Moons 2	Kit	Main role	
2023	The Shiny Group	Jin Xin Xin / Seven Gold Young Masters	Main role	
2024	Insect Detective 2	De / Ter / Xiao De [Thai police officer]	Support Role	
2024	The Rise of Ning	Cheng Lang	Support Role	
2026	Pursuit of Jade	Man Di [Northwest Pig Butcher Squad]	Support Role	
2026	The Epoch of Miyu	Ma Ke Si / Marcos Yang	Support Role	
2026	Veil of Flames	Yun Que [Immortal lord]	Guest Role	
2027	Winner	Chen San Wa	Guest Role	
2027	Kiss In The Wind			

=== Television shows ===
Year	Title	Role	Notes	Network	Ref.
2021	Produce Camp 2021	Contestant	Finished 5th	Tencent	
2023	3Zaap (3 แซ่บ)		Ep 171	YouTube, Channel 3	

=== Music video appearances ===
Year	Song title	Artist (s)
2020	ME (ผมเองครับ)	OXQ
2020	Long Trip (ต้น ธนษิต)	Thanasit Jaturaput
2021	Into The Fire	INTO1
2021	The Storm Center (风暴眼)	INTO1
2021	Hit The Punchline	INTO1
2021	The Ocean of Dunes (风吹沙成海)	INTO1
2021	See You (明早老地方，出发)	INTO1
2022	Go Further (万里)	INTO1
2022	Born To Fly (天生就要飞)	INTO1
2022	Dancing On The Moon (跳支夜的舞)	INTO1
2023	Grown Up	INTO1
2023	BumBuBum	INTO1
2023	I Hate Goodbyes	INTO1
2023	金鸣	Kornchid Boonsathitpakdee / Nine / 高卿尘
2023	从你望向我的那一刻	Kornchid Boonsathitpakdee / Nine / 高卿尘

== Discography ==
=== Studio albums ===
Title	Details
Unseen Boutique (情绪商店)	Released: May 21, 2024; Label: Hahahai-Voc; Formats: Digital download, streaming; Tracklist: 1. "心跳回音"; 2. "浪漫夏日计划"; 3. "薄荷不加冰"; 4. "还给你"; 5. "夜晚陷落"; 6. "绝口不提爱和你"; 7. "狂风暴雨"; 8. "月白"; 9. "极地热恋"; 10. "มัวแต่น่ารัก"
N.I.N.E	Released: June 22, 2026; Label: 讯飞音乐; Formats: Digital download, streaming; Tracklist: 1. "Give Me Five"; 2. "之外"; 3. "怪丘比特"; 4. "晕眩"; 5. "你是不是也疲惫"; 6. "你总是"; 7. "请给我一个回答"; 8. "阶段"; 9. "幸福请帖"

=== Extended plays ===
Title	Details
Fine (不谢)	Released: January 5, 2024; Label: Beijing Xiwen Lejian Culture Media; Formats: Digital download, streaming; Track listing: 1. "眼前你是心上人"; 2. "久久"; 3. "谢谢你"

=== Singles ===
Title	Year	Notes	Ref.
"You At That Time" (那时的你)	2023	Lead artist	
"Jinming" (金鸣)	2023	Jinming musical theatre OST	
"From the Moment You Looked A Me" (从你望向我的那一刻)	2023	Sweet Games OST	
"欢喜赋"	2023	The Shiny Group OST	
"Who are you missing?" (อยู่กับฉัน ฝันถึงใคร)	2024	My Stand-In OST	
"时间的答案"	2024	The theme song for "Call Me By Fire Season 4"	
"允许自己成为树"	2025		
"大步流星"	2025		
"何须问梦中事"	2025		
"我还是藏不住爱你开始奏乐开始舞"	2026	ft. Michelle Chen (陈妍希)	
