= Get Him Girl! =

- Sompoy poster.
- Directed by: Anawat Phromchae Aroonakorn Pick
- Written by: Anawat Phromchae Aroonakorn Pick
- Produced by: Kongkiat Komesiri
- Starring: Pichukkana Wongsarattanasin; Thanapon Jarujitranon; Thatchathon Sabanun; Patteerat Laemluang
- Cinematography: Nattapon Liamwinit
- Edited by: Weerapat Tembundit
- Music by: Rangsan Rasi-dib
- Distributed by: M Pictures
- Release date: 4 November 2021
- Running time: 121 minutes
- Country: Thailand
- Language: Thai

Sompoy (Thai: ส้มป่อย, RTGS: Som Poi), known in English as Get Him Girl!, is a 2021 Thai romantic comedy film, directed by Anawat Phromchae and Aroonakorn Pick.

== Plot ==
The love story follows a young woman named Sompoy, who feels bored with her hometown and yearns for romance with someone from Bangkok.

== Cast ==
- Pichukkana Wongsarattanasin as Sompoy
- Thanapon Jarujitranon as Zaab
- Thatchathon Sabanun as Van
- Patteerat Laemluang as Waew
- Utaiwan Anuwong as Pun
- Yutthapong Tana as Mhan
- Polanat Boonma as Kaew
- Thitanan Tessakarn as Khaotog
- Pongpun Suwee as Kampun
- Prasert Singka as Sompoy's father
- Hernfah Lannathai as Zaab's father
- Saranporn Phinit as Zaab's auntie
- Chativait Saibuth as Ake
- Peerapon Thongpak as Suphachock
- Panutat Apichanatong as Village Headman
- Charinthip Petta as Homestay's kid
- Netnattha Phoungphiphat as Khaotog's mother
- Buachum Inta as Dang
- Pattranit Thongdee as Sompoy (Young)
- Prapaporn Changrue as Pla
- Warunya Veangkham as Pear
- Thanwiphat Wara-assawaphun Pear (Young)
- Inta Laokham as Sompoy's grandfather
- Mala Tatinnam as Sompoy's grandmother
- Kanjarna Pangsuta as Khaek
- Nantawan Tawong as Juu
- Jamjan Saengsing as Jhan
- Jules Viera as Michael

== Original soundtrack ==
- "Mai Khoei" (ไม่เคย) by Mai Mueang
- "Yak Mi Faen Laeo" (อยากมีแฟนแล้ว) by Marie Eugenie Le Lay
