= Thatpong Rojsangruang =

Thai actor (born 2002)

- ทัตพงศ์ โรจน์แสงเรือง
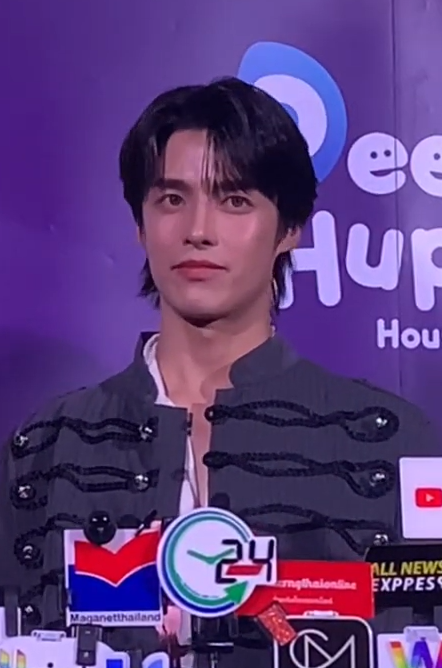
- Heng in 2026
- Born: 15 June 2002 (age 24); Nakhon Ratchasima, Thailand
- Other name: Heng (เฮง)
- Education: Mahidol University (Food Technology)
- Occupation: Actor
- Years active: 2023–present
- Agent: Dee Hup House

Thatpong Rojsangruang (Thai: ทัตพงศ์ โรจน์แสงเรือง; born 15 June 2002), nicknamed Heng (Thai: เฮง), is a Thai actor from Nakhon Ratchasima. He is known for his roles in the series House of Stars (2023), The Yarns (2025), and Love Truck (2026). In 2026, he stars in the series Don't Be Too Emotional on iQIYI.

== Biography and career ==
Heng was born in Nakhon Ratchasima and is studying Food Technology at Mahidol University. He made his acting debut in 2023 in the series House of Stars (สถาบันปั้นดาว), where he played one of the protagonists, Wayha. The series aired on One 31 and the iQIYI platform.

In 2025, he participated in the series The Yarns as Marc, a main role. The following year, he starred in the series Love Truck as Leng, alongside actor Boonyakait Wongsajaem (Tee). In February 2026, he was announced as one of the protagonists of the series Don't Be Too Emotional (อย่าขอพี่เจน), where he will play Jenn Alee (also called "Jane Lek"), alongside Boonyakait Wongsajaem (Tee).

== Filmography ==
=== Television series ===
Year	Title	Role	Notes	Network/Platform
2023	House of Stars	Wayha	Main role	One 31 / iQIYI
2025	The Yarns	Marc	Main role	Monomax, Mono 29
2026	Love Truck	Leng	Main role	Dee Hup House
2026	Don't Be Too Emotional	Jenn Alee / "Jane Lek"	Main role	iQIYI

== Events and fan meetings ==
Year	Date	Event	Location	Notes	Ref.
2023	—	House of Stars Promotional Events	Thailand	Promotional events for the series House of Stars	
2026	27 February	Don't Be Too Emotional Pilot Release	Global / YouTube		
2026	3 March	GEN:D Hack Your Skin 3.3 Event	Bangkok, Thailand	Promotional event with Tee Boonyakait and Heng Thatpong at CentralWorld	
