= Phattharapon Dejpongwaranon =

Thai actor and model (born 1998)

- ภัทรพลฒ์ เดชพงษ์วรานนท์
- Born: Phattharapon Pinta (ภัทรพล ปินตา); 13 July 1998 (age 28); Hang Dong District, Chiang Mai Province, Thailand
- Other name: Donut (โดนัท)
- Education: Rangsit University (Communication Arts)
- Occupations: Actor; model; host; YouTuber
- Years active: 2013–present
- Agent(s): Channel 7 HD (2013–2026); TB Entertainment (2022–present)
- Height: 1.80 m (5 ft 11 in)

Phattharapon Dejpongwaranon (Thai: ภัทรพลฒ์ เดชพงษ์วรานนท์; born 13 July 1998), nicknamed Donut (Thai: โดนัท), is a Thai actor, model, host and YouTuber. He won the "Smart Boy 2013" title at the Thai Supermodel Contest 2013. He was formerly an actor under Channel 7 HD and is now a freelance actor.

== Biography ==
Donut was born on 13 July 1998 in Hang Dong District, Chiang Mai Province. His birth name was Phattharapon Pinta. He won the Smart Boy 2013 competition at the Thai Supermodel Contest 2013, which launched his entertainment career. He later signed as an actor with Channel 7 HD.

He completed his secondary education at Hang Dong Rath Ratsadon Upatham School in Chiang Mai and graduated with a bachelor's degree from the Faculty of Communication Arts at Rangsit University, majoring in Film and Video. He received his degree on 23 January 2022.

== Career ==
=== Television dramas ===
Donut made his acting debut in 2015 with the drama Phaya Sok (พญาโศก). He gained recognition for his roles in Khamin Kap Pun (ขมิ้นกับปูน, 2016), Khun Chai Kai Tong (คุณชายไก่โต้ง, 2018), and Rang Rak Phrang Jai (รางรักพรางใจ, 2021). He also starred as Police Lieutenant Colonel Diao in Sao 5 (เสาร์ ๕, 2022).

He left Channel 7 HD in 2026 after his contract ended and became a freelance actor. He is currently cast in the iQIYI original BL series Don't Be Too Emotional (อย่าขอพี่เจน), where he plays the role of Dan.

=== Other work ===
Donut has also worked as a host on the variety program Thiang Bantern Sot (เที่ยงบันเทิงสด) on Channel 7 HD. He has released several songs, mostly drama soundtracks, including collaborations with Melada Susri (Bow) and Pim Pimprapa.

== Filmography ==
=== Television ===
Year	Title	Role	Role Type	Network
2015	Phayasok (พญาโศก)	Kanang	Support Role	Channel 7 HD
2016	Kamin Gub Poon (ขมิ้นกับปูน)	Thana (young)	Support Role	Channel 7 HD
2018	Khun Chai Kai Tong (คุณชายไก่โต้ง)	Tong / Tony	Main Role	Channel 7 HD
2018	Por Mod Jao Sanae (พ่อมดเจ้าเสน่ห์)	Rome	Main Role	Channel 7 HD
2019	Plerng Sanaeha (เพลิงเสน่หา)	Mok	Main Role	Channel 7 HD
2020	Fah Mee Tawan (ฟ้ามีตะวัน)	Paul Yang / Poramee Suriyakan	Main Role	Channel 7 HD
2021	Rarng Ruk Prang Jai (รางรักพรางใจ)	"Thian" Kharawat Phu-aran	Main Role	Channel 7 HD
2022	Miraculous 5 (เสาร์ ๕)	Diao Somdet	Main Role	Channel 7 HD
2022	Miracle of Love (อุ้มรักปาฏิหาริย์)	"Pheem" Atiruj	Main Role	Channel 7 HD
2023	Marvellous Love (ฤทัยบดี)	Singkham	Main Role	Channel 7 HD
2024	The Deception Game (เล่ห์ร้ายเกมลวง)	Tham	Main Role	Channel 7 HD
2026	Olympus Mystery		Main Role	TBA
2026	Don't Be Too Emotional (อย่าขอพี่เจน)	Dan	Support Role	iQIYI
TBA	Lust		Main Role	iQIYI

=== Short drama ===
- Fah Mee Ta (ฟ้ามีตา) – episode "Rueang Phi" (เรื่องผี) (16 September 2017)

=== Music video ===
- "Rak Term Prom" (รักเติมโปร) – Sen Lek (2014)

=== Host ===
- Thiang Bantern Sot (เที่ยงบันเทิงสด) – Channel 7 HD

=== Discography ===
- "Un Ai Ar torn" (อุ่นไออาทร) – with Channel 7 HD actors (2016)
- "Pup Tong Jum" (ภาพทรงจำ) – tribute song for King Rama IX (2017)
- "Weltee Tee Samkhan" (เวลาที่สำคัญ) – with Channel 7 HD actors (2017)
- "Khoei" (เขิล) – duet with Maylada Susri (Bow) – Khun Chai Kai Tong OST (2018)
- "Ole Ole Ole" (โอเลโอเลโอ) – duet with Pim Pimprapa – Phomad Jao Sanae OST (2018)
- "Katha Rak Diao" (คาถารักเดียว) – duet with Gan Natcha – Rueathai Bodin OST (2023)

== Awards and nominations ==
Year	Award	Category	Result	Work
2013	Thai Supermodel Contest 2013 – Smart Boy 2013		Won	
2017	Daradaily The Great Awards (6th)	Rising Actor of the Year 2016	Nominated	Khamin Kap Pun
2017	Phet Nam Aek Rattanawadi Awards	Outstanding Thai Youth Role Model	Won	
2017	Darainside Award Nakhonrat (2nd)	Best Rising Young Actor of the Year	Won	Sang Soot Tai (แสงสุดท้าย)
2021	Siam Series Awards 2021	Popular New Actor	Nominated	Rang Rak Phrang Jai
2025	Mother's Day Honorary Plaque	Grateful Son Award	Won	
