= 2 Moons =

2017–22 Thai television series

- Official series poster for 2 Moons (season 1)
- Also known as: 2 Moons: The Series
- Original title: เดือนเกี้ยวเดือน (Moon Courting Moon)
- Genre: Teen drama; Boys' love; Romance; Comedy
- Based on: Moon Courting Moon
- Written by: Chiffon_cake
- Screenplay by: Nuttachai Jiraanont (2 Moons 2)
- Directed by: Kanchanapun Meesuwan (2 Moons); Anusorn Soisa-ngim (2 Moons 2); Note Pannapan Songkham (2 Moons: The Ambassadors)
- Starring: 2 Moons Suradet Piniwat; Itthipat Thanit; Warodom Khemmonta; Panuwat Kerdthongtavee; 2 Moons 2 Benjamin Brasier; Teerapat Ruangritkul; Archen Aydin; Kornchid Boonsathitpakdee; 2 Moons: The Ambassadors Bandit Disatharit; Vachara Promma; Chasit Karapim
- Opening theme: "Kae Dai Bpen Kon Soot Tai Tee Tur Kit Teung'" by Pause (2 Moons) '"Between Us'" by August Vachiravit (2 Moons 2)
- Country of origin: Thailand
- Original language: Thai
- No. of seasons: 3
- No. of episodes: 36

Production
- Executive producers: Waranchayan Ananphichaidej; Yachay Konhirun Wittawat Sangsakit (2 Moons); BECI Corporation Company Limited (2 Moons 2)
- Production location: Thailand
- Running time: 45 minutes
- Production companies: Chachi Digital Media Co., Ltd. (2 Moons); Motive Village Co., Ltd. (2 Moons 2)

Original release
- Network: One 31
- Release: 7 May – 23 June 2017
- Network: Mello Thailand
- Release: 22 June – 14 September 2019
- Release: 10 October – 26 December 2022

2 Moons (Thai: เดือนเกี้ยวเดือน; RTGS: Duean Kiao Duean) is a 2017 Thai boys' love drama series. It is adapted from the novel series Moon Courting Moon (Thai: เดือนเกี้ยวเดือน) by web author Chiffon_cake. The first season, simply known as 2 Moons, aired on One 31 from 7 May 2017 to 23 July 2017 for twelve episodes and starred Suradet Piniwat (Bas), Itthipat Thanit (God), Warodom Khemmonta (Kimmon), Panuwat Kerdthongtavee (Copter). The second season, titled 2 Moon 2, aired on Mello Thailand from 29 June 2019 to 14 September 2019 for 12 episodes and starred Benjamin Brasier (Ben), Teerapat Ruangritkul (Earth), Archen Aydin (Joong), Kornchid Boonsathitpakdee (Nine). The third and last season, 2 Moons: The Ambassadors starred Bandit Disatharit (Danny), Vachara Promma (Mark), Chasit Karapim (Hue), Anantadaj Sodsee (Park) premiered on 12 October 2022 and concluded on 26 December 2022 for twelve episodes.

== Synopsis ==
=== 2 Moons (season 1, 2017) ===
Wayo Panitchayasawad is a freshman at the same university as Phana Kongthanin, a second-year student and his longtime hidden lover. Despite his immense reputation as the Campus Moon, Pha doesn't seem to take pleasure in it. The two meet every day when Yo is appointed the Moon of his department. Since Pha seems to pick on Yo, their friendship begins out rocky, but things eventually improve.

=== 2 Moons 2 (season 2, 2019) ===
Wayo has been admitted to the Faculty of Sciences at Kantaphat University. He runs across Phana again there, a second-year boy he has loved for a long time but has never been able to speak to. Since Phana, the former "moon" of the medical faculty, has to oversee the freshmen competing in the competition, Wayo and Phana are thrown together when Wayo gets the chance to become the "moon" of his faculty. The two gradually become closer in spite of a brutal first meeting. Wayo meets Phana's friends Beam and Kit. Despite Kit's initial aversion, Wayo starts courting Kit, with whom Ming, his best buddy, develops an odd friendship.

=== 2 Moons: The Ambassadors (season 3, 2022) ===
Since Park and Pring have made Wayo's damning photos and films public, Pha must endure throughout these powerless moments. Following that situation, the story will depict how their relationship developed. Forth and Beam will also settle down and advance in their relationship, while Ming and Kit will need to learn how to grow and mature.

== Cast and characters ==
=== 2 Moons (season 1) ===
==== Main ====
- Itthipat Thanit (God) as Phana Kongthanin (Pha)
- Suradet Piniwat (Bas) as Wayo Panitchayasawad (Yo)
- Varodom Khemmonta (Kimmon) as Mingkwan Daichapanya (Ming)
- Panuwat Kerdthongtavee (Copter) as Mongkol Intochar (Kit / KitKat / Kitty)
- Darvid Kreepolrerk (Tae) as Jaturapoom Jamornhum (Forth)
- Thanapon Jarujitranon (Tee) as Baramee Vongviphan (Beam)

==== Supporting ====
- Nopparat Monsintorn (Meme) as Suphat Wijittan (Pring)
- Phongsathorn Padungktiwong (Green) as Suthee Sittiprapaphan
- Maryann Porter as Natedaojit Umnhoy (Nate)
- Sattapong Hongkittikul (Scott) as Park
- Chanidapha Leksongcharoen as Cake
- Phee Pikulngern (Haji) as Montri
- Jirayu Sutthisat (M) as Twin 1
- Jirawat Sutthisat as Twin 2
- Sathitpong Taiworachot (Offaff) as Fatty

=== 2 Moons 2 (season 2) ===
==== Main ====
- Benjamin Brasier (Ben) as Phana Kongthanin (Pha)
- Teerapat Ruangritkul (Earth) as Wayo Panitchayasawad (Yo)
- Archen Aydin (Joong) as Mingkwan Daichapanya (Ming)
- Kornchid Boonsathitpakdee (Nine) as Mongkol Intochar (Kit / KitKat / Kitty)
- Naret Promphaopun (Pavel) as Jaturapoom Jamornhum (Forth)
- Woranart Ratthanaphast (Dome) as Baramee Vongviphan (Beam)

==== Supporting ====
- Kanyarat Katiya (Mimi) as Suphat Wijittan (Pring)
- Phongsathorn Padungktiwong (Green) as Suthee Sittiprapaphan
- Pongkorn Wongkrittiyarat (Kaprao) as Park
- Samantha Melanie Coates (Sammy) as Cake
- Phee Pikulngern (Haji) as Montri
- Jirayu Sutthisat (M) as Twin 1
- Jirawat Sutthisat as Twin 2
- Sathitpong Taiworachot (Offaff) as Fatty

=== 2 Moons: The Ambassadors (season 3) ===
==== Main ====
- Bandit Disatharit (Danny) as Tarntatch
- Vachara Promma (Mark) as Lomnaw
- Chasit Karapim (Hue) as Phana Kongthanin (Pha)
- Anantadaj Sodsee (Park) as Wayo Panitchayasawad (Yo)
- Chris Chen (Eiffel) as Mingkwan Daichapanya (Ming)
- Nathapong Sing-on (Toey) as Mongkol Intochar (Kit / KitKat / Kitty)
- Pumipat Paiboon (Prame) as Jaturapoom Jamornhum (Forth)
- Khunnaphat Jaroenchim (Payu) as Baramee Vongviphan (Beam)

==== Supporting ====
- Punnaphat Danaiarunphat (James) as Luknam

== Series overview ==
Series overview
Series	Episodes	Originally released	
Series	Episodes	First released	Last released
2 Moons	12	7 May 2017	23 June 2017
2 Moons 2	12	22 June 2019	14 September 2019
2 Moons 2: The Ambassadors	12	10 October 2022	26 December 2022

== Soundtrack ==
=== 2 Moons (season 1) ===
- Pause – "Kae Dai Bpen Kon Soot Tai Tee Tur Kit Teung" (Opening theme)
- PHCY – "Nup Neung Gun Mai" (Ending title ep. 1-3, 9-10, 12 + 1 special)
- Memê – "Eek Krung... Dai Mai" (Ending theme ep. 4-8)
- Bas Suradet – "Kon Tummadah (Cover Version)" (Ending theme ep. 11)
- The Bottom Blues – "1 2 3 4 5 I Love You"
- Calories Blah Blah – "Yahk Roo... Dtae Mai Yahk Tahm"

=== 2 Moons 2 (season 2) ===
- August Vachiravit – "Between Us" (Opening theme)

== Awards and nominations ==
=== 2 Moons (season 1) ===
- LINE TV Awards 2018 – Best Kiss Scene (Itthipat Thanit and Suradet Piniwat) (Winner)

=== 2 Moons 2 (season 2) ===
- Content Asia Awards 2020 - Best LGBT + Program (Nomination)
