= Boonyakait Wongsajaem =

Thai footballer, actor and model

- บุญยเกียรติ วงค์ษาแจ่ม
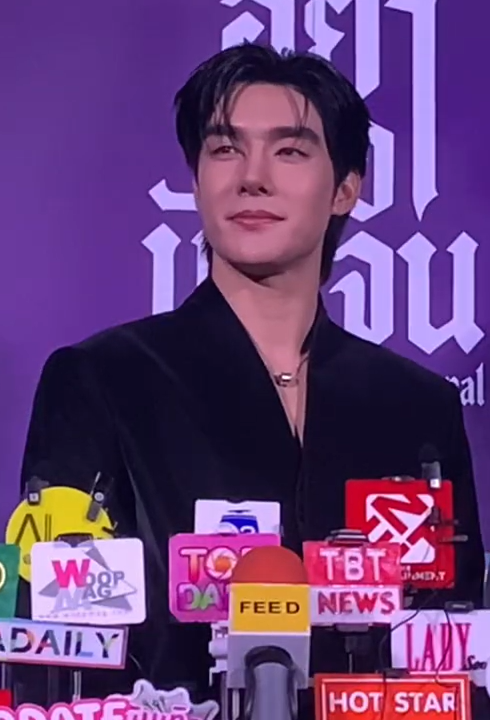
- Boonyakait in 2026
- Born: June 29, 1994 (age 32); Lamphun, Thailand
- Other name: Tee (ตี๋)
- Occupations: Footballer; actor; model
- Years active: 2014–present
- Notable work: Ghostfluencer; Don't Be Too Emotional
Association football career
- Position: Goalkeeper
Team information
- Current team: Uthai Thani
- Number: 18
Youth career
- 2012–2013: Lamphun Warrior
Senior career*
Years	Team	Apps	(Gls)
2014	Army United	0	(0)
2015–2017	Suphanburi	1	(0)
2016	→ PTT Rayong (loan)	4	(0)
2017–2019	PTT Rayong	16	(0)
2019–2020	BG Pathum United	0	(0)
2019	→ Ayutthaya United (loan)	15	(0)
2020–2021	Navy	34	(0)
2021–	Uthai Thani	80	(0)
International career
2024	Thailand	0	(0)
- * Club domestic league appearances and goals as of 18 March 2025

Boonyakait Wongsajaem (Thai: บุญยเกียรติ วงค์ษาแจ่ม; born 29 June 1994), nicknamed Tee (Thai: ตี๋), is a Thai professional footballer, actor and model. He currently plays as a goalkeeper for Thai League 1 club Uthai Thani.

Outside football, Boonyakait began pursuing an acting career in 2026. He appeared in the horror film Ghostfluencer and was cast in the BL series Love Truck and Don't Be Too Emotional.

== Football career ==
Boonyakait, playing as goalkeeper in the 2020/21 season.

Boonyakait began his football career in the youth system of Lamphun Warrior, where he also competed in the 2013 Thailand National Games, winning a silver medal.

In 2014, he signed with Army United, before joining Suphanburi the following year. In 2016, he was loaned to PTT Rayong, where he gained more first-team experience.

He later played for BG Pathum United, Ayutthaya United on loan, and Navy. Since 2021, he has played for Uthai Thani.

In 2024, Boonyakait received his first call-up to the Thailand national team.

== Honours ==
=== Club ===
Uthai Thani

- Thai League 3: 2021–22
- Thai League 3 Northern Region: 2021–22

== Acting career ==
In 2026, Boonyakait made his acting debut in the Dee Hup House BL series Love Truck alongside Thatpong Rojsangruang.

Later that year, he appeared in the horror film Ghostfluencer, portraying Singkham (Sai).

Later in 2026, he was announced as one of the lead actors in the BL series Don't Be Too Emotional, in which he portrays Jane Patrick opposite Thatpong Rojsangruang.

== Filmography ==
=== Film ===
Year	Title	Role	Notes
2026	Ghostfluencer	Singkham / Sai	Main role

=== Television series ===
Year	Title	Role	Notes
2026	Love Truck	Thai	Main role
2026	Don't Be Too Emotional	Jane Patrick / "Jane Yai"	Main role
