= Pichukkana Wongsarattanasin =

Thai actress and model

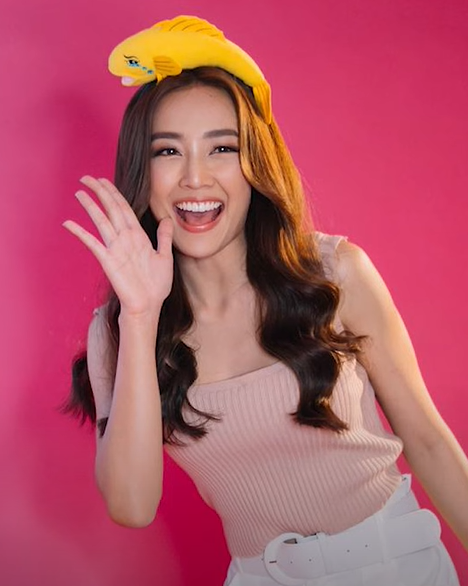
- Born: Pichukkana Wongsarattanasin; August 30, 1991 (age 34); Phrae, Thailand
- Other name: Namtarn
- Occupations: Actress; Model
- Agent: Channel 3 (2012-present)
- Height: 1.70 m (5 ft 7 in)

Pichakkana Wongsarattanasin (Thai: พิจักขณา วงศารัตนศิลป์; born 30 August 1991) nicknamed Namtarn (น้ำตาล) is a Thai actress and model. Known as a Net idol and for a leading role in MajjuratSiNamPhueng in 2013, her dramatic debut.

== Early life ==
Pichukkana was born in Phrae province. Her father was a police officer. Her mother is also a civil servant, and she has a brother who is 6 years younger.

Pichakkana graduated from high school from Muang Khai Pittayakom School, Phrae province. During that time she wrote part of a novel, but stopped before finishing it. After finishing secondary school, Pichukkana studied at the Faculty of Education at Chiang Mai University because she wanted to be a teacher, according to her parents, who were civil servants.

As a first year student, she was a cheerleader and won many beauty-related awards, including the public's favorite award in the Miss CMU League contest, Nitipon Clinic's clear-faced girl award, and Puriku Idol award. Her future personal manager invited her to do photoshoots and TV commercials.

== Career ==
In 2012, she signed a contract as an actress under Channel 3 and in the same year, Arunocha Panupan, the drama producer of Channel 3 as an executive of Broadcast Thai Television Company, chose her to play Rojanachanai, the heroine in the TV series MajjuratSiNamPhueng, instead of Taksaorn Paksukcharern. To pursue her acting career, Pichukkana resigned from Chiang Mai University to study at the Department of Communication Arts Faculty of Management Science Suan Sunandha Rajabhat University. Due to insufficient study time, she moved to the field of film and video science College of Communication Arts Rangsit University in the middle of 2013.

== Filmography ==
=== Television series ===
Year	Title	Role
2013	Majurat See Nam Pueng	Rojanasnai Peung Wichanee
2014	Ruen Rissaya	Nuntanut
2014	Dao Kiang Duen	Darika
2015	Sai Lub Sam Miti	Plaifah / Pawan
2015	Sapai Jao	Salin
2016	Love Songs Love Stories: Lah Ok	Fon
2017	The Cupids (Chapter: Kamathep Online)	Praewproud
2017	Tawan Yor Saeng	Tawan / Yorsaeng Dechabodin / Duangporn
2018	Prakasit Kammathep	Panita / Namtarn
2019	Likit Haeng Jan	Duangkaew / Opal
2019	My Love from Another Star	Prapai
2020	Pom Arthun	Gaysinee
2021	Khaen Rak Salap Chata	Ginny
2022	Lipgloss Spy	Baralee
2023	Love Destiny 2	Mae Klin
2024	The Invincible	Bulan / Kamlai
2025	Eight Count	Lin
2026	Let's Begin Again	Weluri
TBA	Cranium; The Legacy	

=== Film ===
Year	English title	Native Title	Role
2021	Get Him Girl!	ส้มป่อย	Sompoy
2026	Ghostfluencer	สาปเมือง	Fangkham
TBA	Last Fight	Last Fight กูรอด...มึงตาย	
