= Itthipat Thanit =

Thai actor and model (born 1995)

- อิทธิพัทธ์ ฐานิตย์
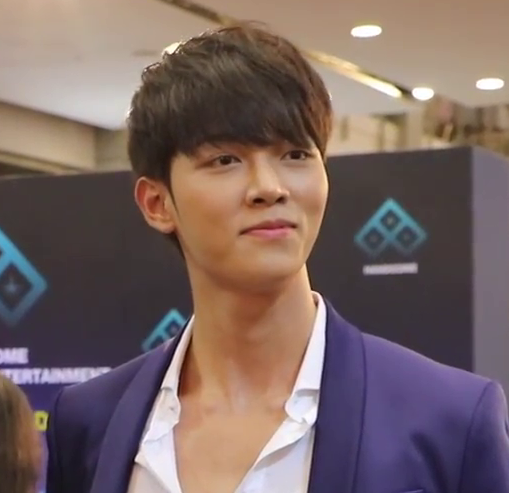
- Itthipat at Handsome Golden Carpet in 2017
- Born: August 4, 1995 (age 31); Samut Prakan, Thailand
- Other name: God (ก็อต)
- Education: Assumption University
- Occupations: Actor; YouTuber
- Years active: 2017–present
- Notable work: 2 Moons; Shadow of Love

Itthipat Thanit (Thai: อิทธิพัทธ์ ฐานิตย์), nicknamed God (Thai: ก็อต), is a Thai actor.

== Life and career ==
Itthiphat was born on 4 August 1995 in Samut Prakan, Thailand. He is currently studying in Assumption University. He has his own brand called XXG store. In 2017, he played the role of P'Pha in the popular boys' love Thai series 2 Moons.

== Filmography ==
=== Television dramas ===
- 2019 My Love From Another Star (Likit Ruk Karm Duang Dao) (ลิขิตรักข้ามดวงดาว) (Broadcast Thai Television/Ch.3) as Sky (สกาย)
- 2020 Shadow of Love (Sorn Ngao Ruk) (ซ่อนเงารัก) (Love Drama/Ch.3) as Nuea-Mek Siraphanit (Nuea) (เหนือเมฆ ศิราพาณิชย์ (เหนือ)) with Oranate D. Caballes & Sadanun Balenciaga
- 2022 My Friend, The Enemy (Koo Wein) (คู่เวร) (Good Feeling/Ch.3) as Wayu Chaiwat (Wayu) (วายุ ชัยวัฒน์ (วายุ)) with Monchanok Saengchaipiangpen
- 20 Sai Lub Lip Gloss () (/Ch.3) as Danupob () with Lapassalan Jiravechsoontornkul

=== Television series ===
- 2017 2 Moons (เดือนเกี้ยวเดือน ซีซั่น 1) (Chachi Digital Media And Motive Village/One 31) as Phana Kongthanin (Doctor Pha) (พนา ก้องธานินทร์ (หมอป่า))
- 2018 Hi, I'm Saori (我的保姆手冊) (/ZJTV) as Hu Ze Hao (蘇達浩) with Zheng Shuang
- 2019 Nong Mai Rai Borisut () (/Ch.3) as U ()
- 2019 ReminderS () (/LINE TV) as ()
- 2022 Finding the Rainbow (Finding The Rainbow สุดท้าย…ที่ปลายรุ้ง) (/Viu Original) as Non (นนท์) with Sushar Manaying

=== Television sitcom ===
- 2017 Under Her Nose (พ่อบ้านใจกล้าสตอรี่) (The Pipal Tree/Workpoint TV) as Bom (บอม) (รับเชิญ EP.23, EP.24)
