= Ponlawit Ketprapakorn =

Thai actor and model (born 1999)

- พลวิชญ์ เกตุประภากร
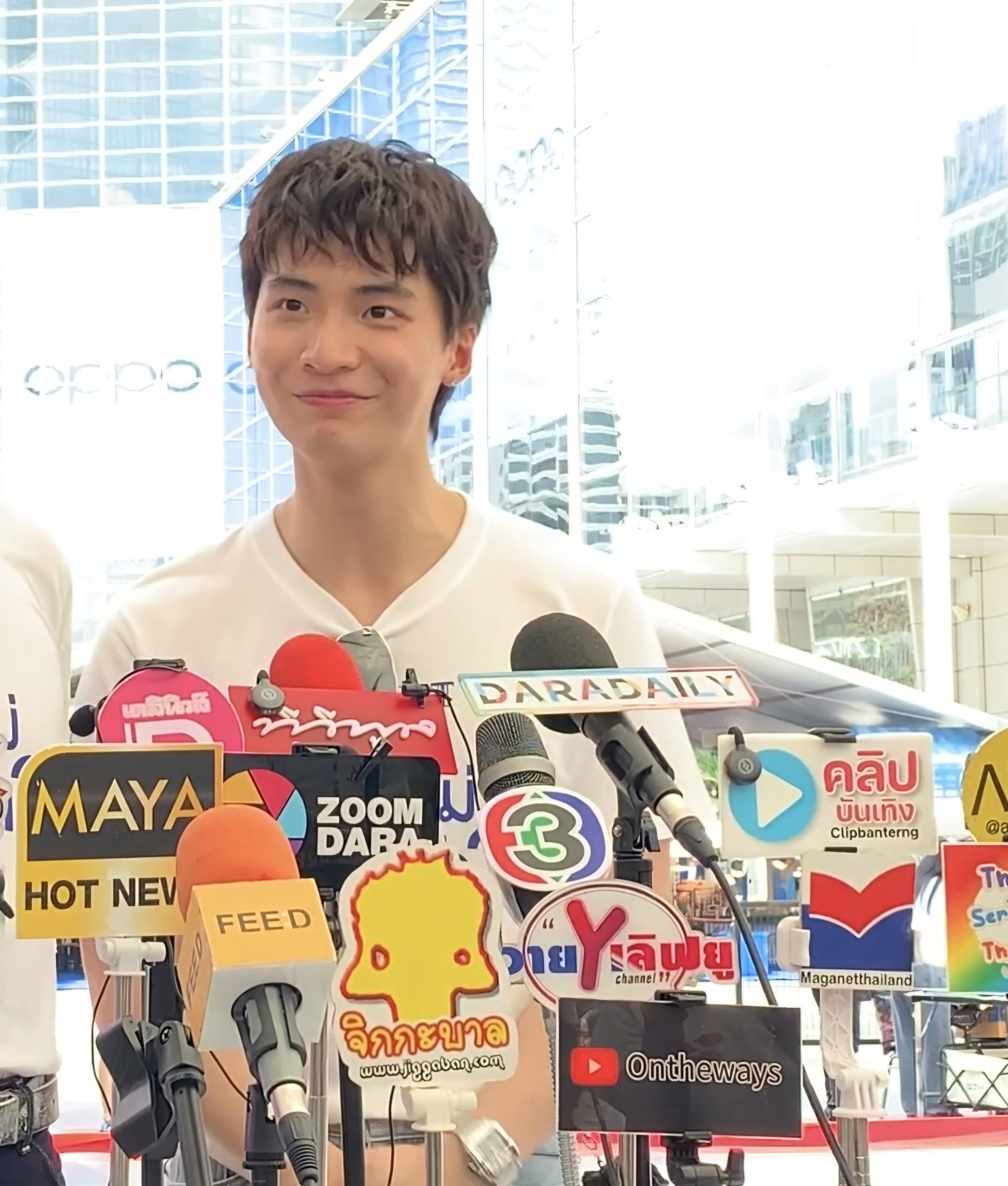
- Pond in May 2025
- Born: March 25, 1999 (age 27); Bangkok, Thailand
- Other names: Zhang Jinqi, Pond
- Education: Chulalongkorn University
- Occupations: Actor, model
- Years active: 2018–present
- Agent: Nadao Bangkok (–2022)
- Known for: My Ambulance; Bangkok Love Stories 2: Innocence; 180 Degree Longitude Passes Through Us; Reset
- Relatives: Narikun Ketprapakorn (sister)

Ponlawit Ketprapakorn (Thai: พลวิชญ์ เกตุประภากร; born 25 March 1999), nicknamed Pond (Thai: ปอนด์), is a Thai actor. His notable works in Thai television series include: Bangkok Love Stories: Innocence (2018), My Ambulance (2019), 180 Degree Longitude Passes Through Us (2022) and Reset (2025).

== Early life and education ==
Ponlawit was born in Thailand. He is the younger brother of Narikun Ketprapakorn (Frung), a Thai actress. Pond noted in an interview that he was often referred to simply as "Frung's younger brother," which motivated him to build his own reputation in the entertainment industry.

He enrolled in the Faculty of Engineering at Chulalongkorn University. By the age of 20, he was already in his fourth year of the program. In October 2014, he completed a Master of Business Administration at the Faculty of Commerce and Accountancy, Chulalongkorn University.

== Career ==
Ponlawit began his acting career appearing in Thai television dramas and anthology series. He gained broader recognition through roles in nationally broadcast series such as Bangkok Love Stories: Innocence (2018) and My Ambulance (2019).

In mid-2022, Pond began working with new production companies. This coincided with his former management agency, Nadao Bangkok, announcing the discontinuation of its artist management and production operations. Following the closure of his former talent agency, Pond continued his acting career as a freelance artist. He subsequently took on a leading role in the multilayer drama series 180 Degree Longitude Passes Through Us (เส้นลองจิจูดที่ 180 องศาลากผ่านเรา), produced by Miti Art Media. In the series, which explores complex family dynamics and cross-generational LGBTQ+ romance, Pond starred alongside veteran actors Kathaleeya McIntosh and Nitidon Pomsuwan. He portrayed a teenager who falls in love with his mother's longtime friend.

In 2024, he starred in the romantic drama series Fourever You, which further increased his visibility among Thai television audiences. He gained increased popularity after starring in the BL series RESET. The series garnered the highest viewership across more than 190 regions worldwide for nine consecutive weeks and held the number one spot on the iQIYI streaming platform.

== Controversies ==
In late March 2025, Pond faced significant public backlash following a severe magnitude 8.2 earthquake originating in Myanmar that caused noticeable tremors, damage, and casualties across Thailand. During the event, Pond posted a joke on social media stating, "That shaking isn't an earthquake, it's the sound of my heart beating." The post was heavily criticized by netizens for being insensitive to a natural disaster that had caused loss of life and property damage. Pond subsequently deleted the post and issued a public apology, citing thoughtlessness and a lack of awareness regarding the severity of the situation.

== Filmography ==
=== Television series ===
Year	Title	Role	Network	Notes	Ref
2018	Bangkok Love Stories: Innocence	Danny	Netflix	Main role	
2019	My Ambulance	Wan	Mewatch, Nadao Bangkok	Supporting role	
2019	Clean and Jerk	Talent	Thai PBS	Main role	
2020	Quarantine Stories	Ken	Nadao Bangkok	Main role	
2021	Drama for All: Criminal People 5G	Book	Thai PBS	Main role	
2022	180 Degree Longitude Passes Through Us	Wang	One 31	Main role	
2023	The Interns	Best	Thai PBS	Main role	
2023	Counter Corruption	"Khun" Pongkhun Wannaphibal	Amarin TV	Main role	
2023	Love Destiny 2	Por Wek	Channel 3 HD	Guest role	
2023	Liar	Surasit	Amarin TV	Supporting role	
2024	Once upon a Time	Pharadon	Thai PBS	Main role	
2024	Century of Love	Trai / Third	Netflix, iQIYI	Supporting role	
2024	Fourever You	Hill	WeTV, Rakuten Viki	Main role	
2025	The Death of Khun Pra	Sangthong	Thai PBS	Main role	
2025	Reset	Armin Thiwanon	iQIYI	Main role	
2025	ClaireBell	"Top" Chanchanok Sangkhabut	One 31	Supporting role	
2025	Fourever You 2	Hill	WeTV	Supporting role	
2026	Eternal Rain	Tang Tinara	Monomax	Supporting role	
2026	The Edge of Horizon	Prince Chatthorn Varakulvathin	One 31	Supporting role	

== Awards and nominations ==
Year	Award	Category	Result	Ref
2025	Feed X Khaosod Awards 2025	Best BL Actor of the Year Award	Won	
