= My Cherie Amour =

My Cherie Amour may refer to:

- My Cherie Amour (album), a 1969 album by Stevie Wonder
- "My Cherie Amour" (song), a 1969 song by Stevie Wonder
