= Suradet Piniwat =

Thai actor and singer (born 1999)

- สุรเดช พินิวัตร์
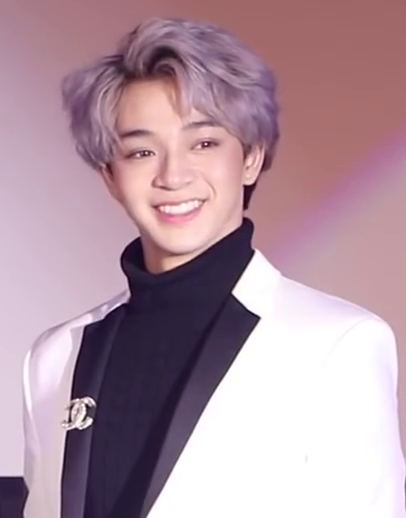
- Suradet in 2018
- Born: 4 March 1999 (age 27); Bangkok, Thailand
- Other names: Bas, Bass
- Occupations: Actor; singer
- Years active: 2016–present
- Agent: Star Hunter Studio
- Notable work: 2 Moons
- Height: 170 cm (5 ft 7 in)
- Musical career
- Instruments: Vocals; guitar
- Member of: SBFIVE

Suradet Piniwat (Thai: สุรเดช พินิวัตร์, RTGS: Suradet Phiniwat, IPA: [sù.rá.dèːt pʰí.ní.wát]; born 4 March 1999), nicknamed Bas (Thai: บาส), is a Thai actor and singer. He came to prominence for his role of Wayo in the Thai boys' love television series 2 Moons (2017).

== Early life and education ==
Raised in Chiang Mai, Suradet was born on 4 March 1999 in Bangkok, Thailand. He has a younger sister named Praepailin Piniwat, who was a trainee in BNK48. He currently studies GED (General Educational Development) at a university.

== Filmography ==
=== Film ===
Year	Title	Role	Network
2018	The Right One	Bas	ACNOC YT
2020	Bullet Teen	Ta	
2021	Tell The World I Love You	Kheng	
2021	You Are My Arm	Pong	

=== Television series ===
Year	Title	Role	Network
2016	U-Prince: The Extroverted Humanist	Mark	GMM One
2017	Love Songs Love Series To Be Continued	Dah	GMM25
2017	2 Moons	Wayo	LINE TV, GMM One
2018	Way Back Home	Well	Channel 3
2018	Cinderella Chef	Prince	QQLive
2019	2 Brothers	Tony	LINE TV, GMM 25
2019	Hotel Stars The Series	Toey	Mello Thailand
2020	Dad... Be and Will Not Disappear	Fluke	ThaiPBS
2020	Gen Y The Series	Wayu	Channel 3
2021	Gen Y The Series Season 2	Wayu	Channel 3
2022	What Zabb Man!	Beebas	Amarin TV 34
2022	Close Friend 2	Seonmin	Viu
2022	My Lucky Cat The Series	Kasidet Danaiphiriya ( Moji )	

=== Musical ===
Year	Title	Role
2018	See You In The Dream	Bas

== Discography ==
=== Singles ===
Year	Title
2017	คนธรรมดา (An Ordinary Man )
2018	คนที่ใช่ ไม่ต้องเปลี่ยนอะไรก็ใช่อยู่ดี(The Right Person Doesn't Need to Change Anything; It's Already Perfect)
2020	สมองเหงา (Lonely Brain)
2020	ดีดีอยู่ (Why)
2020	ดาว (DAO / STAR)
2021	สุดท้ายระหว่างเรา (The Last Between Us)
2021	เพื่อนรัก (Dear Friend)
2021	บอกตัวเอง (Tell Yourself)
2022	เธอทั้งนั้น(You Too)
2022	กาลครั้งหนึ่ง(Once Upon A Time)

=== SBFIVE ===
Year	Title
2017	WHENEVER
2018	SPARK (ช็อต...หัวใจ)
2019	SUPERBOY
2019	DREAM (เรื่องของความฝัน)
2020	GOOD DAY (สิ่งดีดีทุกวัน)
2020	CANDY CRUSH (THAI VERSION)
2020	CANDY CRUSH (INTERNATIONAL VERSION)
2020	YOUR MAN

=== BKC ===
Year	Title
2023	มีเขาเหงาได้ไง (Why Lonely)

=== Collaborations ===
Year	Artist	Song title
2020	Copter SBFIVE ( Feat. BAS SBFIVE, Alvin Chong )	GIRL WENT GONE
2020	Tung	40KM/HR
2021		ความสุขแอคทีฟได้（Active happiness）
2021	Star Hunter Artistsc	วันหนึ่งในฤดูหนาว (Winter of love)
2021	Star Hunter Artistsc	All I Want For Christmas Is You

=== Music videos ===
Year	Artist	Song title
2020	Isbanky	"รักโดยไม่มีเหตุผล (Love Is Love)"
2021	Perth Tanapon	"เหตุผลที่ฉันไม่กลับมา (The Reason I Don't Come Back)"
2021	Doy	"บอกโลกให้รู้ (Tell The World)"

== Endorsements ==
- ACNOC
- VOOV Thailand
- AIS One-2-Call ZEED SIM
- Taokaenoi
- Government Savings Bank (GSB)
- BKC Plus
- Star girl
- Halls Chews
- Arabus
- Viva Plus
- Magnolia Milky

== Awards and nominations ==
Year	Award	Category	Recipient / Nominated work	Result
2017	KAZZ AWARDS 2017	Young Star of 2017	Himself	Won
2017	Great Stars Social Super Star of the Year	Couple of the Year	with Itthipat Thanit for 2 Moons	Nominated
2018	LINE TV AWARDS	Best Kiss Scene	with Itthipat Thanit for 2 Moons	Won
2018	SANOOK	Couple of the Year	with Itthipat Thanit for 2 Moons	Nominated
2018	ATTITUDE 7th Anniversary	Rising Star of the Year 2018	Himself	Won
2018	KAZZ AWARDS 2018	New Actor Award	Himself	Won
2018	STARMOMETER	Ultimate Asian Heartthrob of 2018 (2nd Placer)	Himself	Won
2018	MAYA AWARDS 2018	A celebrity couple	with Itthipat Thanit for 2 Moons	Nominated
2018	MAYA AWARDS 2018	male star public favorite	Himself	Nominated
2019	daradaily Awards 2019	POPULAR VOTE Awards Male	Himself	Nominated
