= List of GL dramas =

Girls' love dramas, commonly known as GL, are Asian dramatic television, streaming television, and web (i.e. short-form) series featuring romantic relationship between female leads. The list is divided by countries and year of release.

== Japan ==
=== 2010s ===
Year	Title	Broadcaster(s)	Notes/Ref.
2015	Transit Girls	Fuji Television	
2017	Futari Monologue	Tokyo MX	

=== 2020s ===
Year	Title	Broadcaster(s)	Notes/Ref.
2022	She Loves to Cook, and She Loves to Eat	NHK General TV	Season 1
2023	Young Ladies Don't Play Fighting Games	NTT Docomo	
2024	She Loves to Cook, and She Loves to Eat	NHK General TV	Season 2
2024	* Chaser Game W: My Evil Boss is My Ex-Girlfriend	TV Tokyo	Season 1
2024	Chaser Game W2: Utsukushiki Tennyotachi	TV Tokyo	Season 2
2024	Stardust Telepath	TV Tokyo	
2024	Ayaka Is in Love with Hiroko!	MBS	Season 1
2024	Kimi no Tsugu Kaori wa (The Fragrance You Inherit)	Tokyo MX	
2025	Call Me by No-Name	MBS	
2025	Even Though We're Adults	Hulu, Nippon TV	
2025	Ayaka Is in Love with Hiroko! 2nd Stage	MBS	Season 2
2025	Futari Escape	TV Osaka, TV Aichi	
2026	How Do We Relationship?	MBS	
2026	In That Moment, It Was Love	nooto.(ノオト)	

== Thailand ==
=== 2020s ===
Year	Title	Broadcaster(s)	Notes/Ref.
2022	Gap	YouTube (Idol Factory), Channel 3, Workpoint TV	
2023	Show Me Love	Grand TV	
2023	Love Senior	YouTube	
2023	Lucky My Love	YouTube	
2024	Blank The Series	YouTube	Two seasons
2024	23.5	GMM 25, YouTube, Netflix	
2024	My Marvellous Dream Is You	YouTube (Idol Factory)	
2024	Love Bully	Change2561	
2024	The Secret of Us	Channel 3, Netflix	
2024	The Loyal Pin	YouTube (Idol Factory), Workpoint TV	
2024	Reverse 4 You	Channel 3, YouTube, Netflix	
2024	Affair	One 31, Netflix	
2024	Unlock Your Love	YouTube	
2024	Apple My Love	YouTube	
2024	Pluto	GMM 25, YouTube, Viu	
2024	Mhom Ped Sawan	Thai PBS	
2024	Petrichor The Series	iQIYI, One 31	
2024	Mate The Series	YouTube	
2024	I Am Devil	Channel 9, YouTube	Two seasons, 2024–2025
2025	Us	GMM 25, YouTube	
2025	Reverse with Me	Channel 3, iQIYI, YouTube	
2025	I'm Your Moon	Amarin TV, YouTube	
2025	Denied Love	We TV	
2025	B-Friend	MCOT, IDX Entertainment	
2025	Whale Store xoxo	GMM 25, Netflix	Set in the same universe as Enemies with Benefits and Bake Love Feeling
2025	Only You	Channel 3, Netflix	
2025	Harmony Secret	One 31, Netflix	
2025	Somewhere Somehow	YouTube (Idol Factory), Channel 3	
2025	Roller Coaster The Series	Channel 3	
2025	Queendom	WeTV	
2025	Poisonous Love	iQIYI, YouTube, Channel 3	
2025	Love Design	WeTV, Channel 3, Netflix	
2025	Player The Series	iQIYI	
2025	Dangerous Queen	Channel 7, YouTube	
2025	Unlimited Love	YouTube, Channel 7	
2025	My Safe Zone	Channel 3	
2025	ClaireBell	One 31, YouTube, OneD	
2025	Runaway	Channel 3, YouTube	
2025	Like a Palette	Channel 3	
2025	MuTeLuv: Hello, is this Luck?	GMM 25, YouTube	
2026	4 Elements: The Earth	iQIYI, Channel 7	Set within the 4 Elements universe
2026	Be My Angel	iQIYI, GagaOOLala	
2026	I Wanna Be Sup'tar	One 31, YouTube	
2026	Heart Code	Monomax	
2026	Frozen Valentine	WeTv	
2026	Play Park	Channel 3	
2026	My Only Sunshine	GMM 25, iQIYI	
2026	Girl Rules	GMM 25, iQIYI	
2026	4 Elements: The Water	iQIYI, Channel 7	Set within the 4 Elements universe
2026	Broken of Love	YouTube	
2026	Hometown Romance	One 31, OneD	
2026	Shades	TrueVisions	
2026	Fulfill	Channel 3	
2026	Chasing Love (Thai TV series)	One 31, Netflix	
2026	Enemies with Benefits	GMM 25, OneD	Set in the same universe as Whale Store xoxo and Bake Love Feeling
2026	Love Beyond Dreams	iQIYI, YouTube	Shares the same universe as AI Girl
2026	4 Elements: The Air	iQIYI, Channel 7	Set within the 4 Elements universe
2026	In Love Forever	Channel 3	
2026	AI Girl (Thai TV Series)	iQIYI, YouTube	Shares the same universe as Love Beyond Dreams
2026	4 Elements: The Fire	iQIYI, Channel 7	Set within the 4 Elements universe
2026	Moonshadow	GMM 25, OneD	
2026	Juliet & Juliet	One 31, OneD, GagaOOLala, Line TV	
2026	Fairway of Love	One 31, WeTV	
2026	Khom Khlang	WeTV	
2026	Pls love	Channel 3, iQIYI	
2026	Third Person	YouTube	
2026	Love on Hire	WeTV	
2026	Built in Love	Studio Wabi Sabi	
2026	Love Me to Hurt Me	Channel 3, iQIYI	
2026	Under Her Rules	iQIYI	
2026	Oxytoxin	GMM 25, Netflix	
2026	Love Bound	Channel 9 (Channel 30), iQIYI	

=== Upcoming ===
GMMTV

- Ditto
- Love's Echoes
- Bake Love Feeling (Set in the same universe as Whale Store xoxo and Enemies with Benefits)
- Wish upon a Star
- Her
- Beyond You
- Above Her Class
- Kiss Me, Stranger
- Cherish
- My Beautiful Enemy
- Lost in Your Eyes
- Be Mine: Be My Baby
- Be Mine: Be My Sugar
- Be Mine: Be My Boo
- Be Mine: More & More
- Safety Flirt

Other

- Buy My Boss – MCOT HD
- Remain – YouTube
- The Hidden Blood – Channel 7
- Love in Quarantine – YouTube
- Trial Love – Channel 3
- Cranium – YouTube (Idol Factory)
- Love Above The Clouds — Century UU Thailand
- Did You Know — Domundi TV

== Other countries ==
=== Cambodia ===
Year	Title	Broadcaster(s)	Notes/Ref.
2024	Don't Mess with Senior	YouTube	
2024	Is You	YouTube	

=== China ===
Year	Title	Broadcaster(s)	Notes/Ref.
2021	Legend of Yun Qian	Kuaidian TV	(Two seasons, 2021—2022)
2022	Led Astray by Love	Kuaishou	
2025	Who Knows Girls' L	YouTube	
2025	The Secret of Girls	WeChat	
2026	She Is Still Cute Today	Tencent Video	

=== South Korea ===
Year	Title	Broadcaster(s)	Notes/Ref.
2015	Lily Fever	Naver TV	
2022	Girlfriend Project Day 1	YouTube	
2022	She Makes My Heart Flutter	YouTube	
2025	An Office Thing	YouTube	
2025	ON&OFF	YouTube	
2025	Almost Lover	YouTube	
2025	Friendly Rivalry	Netflix	

=== Taiwan ===
Year	Title	Broadcaster(s)	Notes/Ref.
2021–2025	Fragrance of the First Flower	GagaOOLala, Netflix Asia	(Two seasons, 2021—2025)

=== Vietnam ===
Year	Title	Broadcaster(s)	Notes/Ref.
2023	Omai	YouTube	

== See also ==
- Lists of television programs with LGBT characters
- Homoeroticism
