= 4Elements (Thai TV series) =

2026 Thai television series

- Official series poster
- Also known as: 4Elements : บ้านวาทินวณิช
- Genre: Girls' love; Romantic; Drama; Action
- Based on: 4Elements by Salmon (แซลม่อน)
- Written by: Tinna Simapaisal (The Earth, The Air, The Fire); Sarut Samngamjam (The Water)
- Directed by: Kittisak Cheewasatjasakun
- Starring: Lapisara Intarasut; Panthita Jencharoentham; Engfa Waraha; Charlotte Austin; Sarocha Chankimha; Rebecca Patricia Armstrong; Milin Watinthanakit; Kanteera Wadcharathadsanakul
- Country of origin: Thailand
- Original language: Thai Language
- No. of seasons: 1
- No. of episodes: 32

Production
- Producer: Kanyarat Jiraratchakit
- Production location: Thailand
- Running time: 85-102 minutes
- Production company: NorthStar Entertainment

Original release
- Network: Channel 7HD; IQIYI
- Release: 24 January – 29 August 2026

4Elements (Thai: บ้านวาทินวณิช; RTGS: "Baan Watinwanich", lit. '4Elements') is a Thai series consists of 4 dramas, The Earth, The Water, The Air and The Fire (the classical elements). The television series is based on the novel series of the same name written by Salmon (แซลม่อน), it is directed by Kittisak Cheewasatjasakun and produced by NorthStar Entertainment. It was aired every Saturday from 24 January 2026 to 29 August 2026. The series premiered on Channel 7 with the uncut version made available for streaming an hour after the initial broadcast.

== History ==
The first announcement of the series was made on 12 January 2025, during the "Idolfactory Project Line up 2025" event held by IdolFactory. The series was a part of "Sapphic Series MEGA Project", with a confirmation that 4Elements was in the process of being made into a television series and will be using the same titles as the novels. All four series will be produced by NorthStar Entertainment and directed by the same director.

During the following months, the series' official account on Twitter (X) was posting hints on the cast for the main roles. A one-minute overture video, an official poster, as well as the main cast reveal for The Fire, The Air, The Water and The Earth were released on 8 March, 15 March, 22 March and 29 March, respectively.

On 25 April 2025, the official press conference event for the series, "4Elements: The Global Phenomenon of Girl Love", was held at River Park, Iconsiam. During the event, it was announced that the series will be airing every Saturday from 20:30 on Channel 7 HD, making it one of the first Girls' Love series to broadcast during the prime time on one of the top national television channel.

On 11 Jan 2026, NorthStar Entertainment held the official opening event of the series, "4Elements: The Grand Unveiling" ,was held at Union Hall.

== Novel ==
Novel 4Elements is a four-part GL novel series by Thai author Salmon, with each book inspired by one of the classical elements: Earth, Water, Air and Fire. The stories follow four cousins, each navigating complex relationships shaped by their personalities and the symbolic nature of their element.

Though the stories are self-contained, they are connected through emotional depth, strong female leads and the theme of love triumphing over adversity.

Salmon, known for her vivid character development and emotionally layered storytelling, is one of Thailand's most recognized voices in the Girls' Love literary space. Her writing often weaves in themes of identity, class, duty and vulnerability presenting love stories that are both romantic and socially relevant. The success of the 4Elements series led IdolFactory and NorthStar Entertainment to acquire adaptation rights in 2024, bringing the stories to life as a highly anticipated live-action anthology.

Each episode features a different lead couple from Thailand's top GL actresses, making this project a major milestone for both Thai literature and queer representation on screen.

== Family trees ==
=== Watinwanich family ===
Watinwanich family tree

| Kasidit; Watinwanich | | Kotchakorn; Wathinwanich | Adisorn; Watinwanich | | Pawee; Wathinwanich | Wathit; Watinwanich | | Yosita; Watinwanich | Akanee; Watinwanich | | Phakhwan; Wathinwanich |
| | Kasama Watinwanich "Din" | | Thipapha; Amornjida "Rose" | Apo Watinwanich "Nam" | | Chonlada; Kunanon "Lada" | Vayo Watinwanich "Lom" | | Catherine; Blew de Laina de Madelin "Blew" | Atchima Watinwanich "Fai" | | Atthitaya "Kaphrao" |

- Din, Nam, Lom and Fai are cousins, not real siblings. However, the fathers of all 4 are siblings.
- Kaphrao's last name was never revealed in the novels.

== Broadcast and release ==
The broadcast order of 4Elements
| Season | Title | Episodes | Original airing | | Notes |
| Season | Title | Episodes | First airing date | Last airing date | Notes |
|---|---|---|---|---|---|
| 1 | The Earth | 8 | 24 January 2026 | 14 March 2026 | |
| 2 | The Water | 8 | 21 March 2026 | 9 May 2026 | |
| 3 | The Air | 8 | 16 May 2026 | 4 July 2026 | |
| 4 | The Fire | 8 | 11 July 2026 | 29 August 2026 | |

== The Earth ==
=== Main ===
- Lapisara Intarasut(Apple) as Kasama Wathinwanit (Din)
- Panthita Jencharoentham (Mim) as Tipapha Amornjinda (Rose)

=== Supporting ===
- Nutthasit Panyangarm (Nodt) as Wasu
- Piya Vimuktayon (Ex) as Wasupol
- Pathsitar Pheongkong (Fame) as Kaew
- Rachaya Rakkasikorn (Ae) as Chan
- Ake Oree (Day) as Kla
- Surasak Chaiyaat (Nu) as Thipakorn Amornjinda (Thip)
- Natsinee Charoensitthisap (Mint) as Moddaeng

=== Guest ===
- Penpetch Benyakul (Jab) as Kasidit Wathinwanit
- Alina Marie Chang (Alina) as young Din
- Wakie Kuznetsova (Jasmina) as young Rose
- Pannawit Thong-inn (Good) as young Wasu

== The Water ==
=== Main ===
- Engfa Waraha (Mook) as Apo Wathinwanit (Nam)
- Charlotte Austin (Charlotte) as Chonlada Kunanon (Lada)

=== Supporting ===
- Thanapon Thongchua (Pete) as Adisorn Wathinwanit
- Phol Tantasathien (Phol) as Pheemdet Watcharadecha
- Nicole Theriault (Nikki) as Chutimon Kunanon (Mon)
- Asavarid Pinitkanchanapan (Heng) as Pheempat Watcharadecha (Pat)
- Prachakorn Piyasakulkaew (Sun) as Pheemwat Watcharadecha (Wat)
- Thanthip Thaweesinthanat (Mew) as Farin Carver (Fah)
- Suchita Oxman (Meena) as Nate
- Panichada Kongsawanya (Xobam) as Preem
- Michelle Behrmann (Michelle) as Wadee
- Chutima Sodapak (Arm) as Nuch

=== Guest ===
- Kochakorn Nimakorn (Ngor) as Pawee
- Piya Pongkullapa (Giftza) as Mei
- Jessica Wang (Paope) as Chef Ean

== The Air ==
=== Main ===
- Sarocha Chankimha (Freen) as Police Lieutenant Vayo Wathinwanit (Lom / Wind)
- Rebecca Patricia Armstrong (Becky) as Princess Catherine Blew de Laina de Madeline (Blew / Phatpha) and Helena

=== Supporting ===
- Lieutenant General Wanchana Sawasdee (Bird) as Police General Wathit Wathinwanit
- Peter Tuinstra (Peter) as King Arthur de Laina de Madeline
- Angus Moir (Justin) as Prince Karel Jean de Laina de Madeline
- Renita Veronica Pagano (Renée) as Grace
- Thitisan Goodburn (Kim) as Henri
- Prompatcha Sanitwong Na Ayutthaya (Frung) as Police Sub-Lieutenant Beam
- Orntara Poolsak (Looknam) as Buakiang, Buahima and Bua
- Ken Streutker (Ken) as Antoine
- Pichet Iamchaona (Yong Chernyim) as Boonsong
- Vattcharachai Sundarasiri (Ant) as Suea
- Lerwith Sangsith (Aon) as Yod
- Natchukorn Maikan (Nong) as Santi

=== Guest ===
- Kevlin Kortland (Aon) as Yosita Wathinwanit
- Ampa Phusit (Aew) as Phaka
- Thitayaporn Prasertsom (Fayfay) as Mew

== The Fire ==
=== Main ===
- Milin Watinthanakit (Namneung) as Atchima Wathinwanit (Fai)
- Kanteera Wadcharathadsanakul (Noey) as Athittaya (Kaphrao)

=== Supporting ===
- Somchai Khemglad (Tao) as Akanee Wathinwanit (Ak)
- Prima Ratchata (Duean) as Aunt Panee
- Charm Osathanond (Charm) as Wanna
- Rachaya Tupkunanon (Minmin) as Note
- Jiradapa Intajak (Pupe) as Jeerapha
- Lerwith Sangsith (Aon) as Yod
- Suttatip Wutchaipradit (Ampere) as Paen

=== Guest ===
- Praveenar Singh as Master of Ceremony (MC)
- Winnawich Sriprasong as Arthit
- Wanichaya Pornpanarittichai (Minna) as young Fai
- Milina Onnuam (Milin) as young Kaphrao

== Original soundtracks ==
=== 4 Elements ===
| No. | Title | Lyrics | Artist | Length |
|---|---|---|---|---|
| 1. | "Love And Destiny" () | Chopin Nanan | Tata Young | 3:46 |
| 2. | "Don't You Love Me" (รักฉันบ้างหรือเปล่า ) | Paween Wongrat | Becky Rebecca (Rebecca Armstrong) | 4:14 |
| Total length: | | | | 7:60 |

=== The Earth ===
| No. | Title | Lyrics | Artist | Length |
|---|---|---|---|---|
| 1. | "You got Me" (เธอจะมีฉัน) | Paween Wongrat | Lapisara Intarasut | 3:50 |
| 2. | "My Always" (นานๆนะ) | Paween Wongrat | Lapisara Intarasut; Panthita Jencharoentham | 3:31 |
| Total length: | | | | 10:32 |

=== The Water ===
| No. | Title | Lyrics | Artist | Length |
|---|---|---|---|---|
| 1. | "Is This Love?" (หรือนี่คือความรัก) | Paween Wongrat | Engfa Waraha | 4:12 |
| 2. | "Lucky Me" (โชคดีที่สุดเลย) | Paween Wongrat | Charlotte Austin | 3:35 |
| Total length: | | | | 8:47 |

=== The Air ===
| No. | Title | Lyrics | Artist | Length |
|---|---|---|---|---|
| 1. | "All for you" (หมดชีวิต) | Paween Wongrat | Freen Sarocha | 3:29 |
| 2. | "Only You" (Thai: แค่มีเธอก็พอแล้ว) | Paween Wongrat | Becky Rebecca (Rebecca Armstrong) | 3:40 |
| 3. | "Stay With Me" () | Paween Wongrat | Noona Nuengthida | 3:22 |
| Total length: | | | | 10:31 |

=== The Fire ===
| No. | Title | Lyrics | Artist | Length |
|---|---|---|---|---|
| 1. | "It's You" (คือเธอ) | Paween Wongrat | Namneung Milin | 3:21 |
| 2. | "Back Again" (Thai: กลับมาพบกัน) | Paween Wongrat | Namneung Milin & Noey Kanteera | 4:15 |
| 3. | "Secret Love" (Thai: เก็บไว้ไม่ให้ใครรู้) | Paween Wongrat | Noey Kanteera | 3:56 |
| Total length: | | | | 11:32 |

== Ratings ==
In this table, the blue numbers represent the lowest ratings and the red numbers represent the highest ratings.

=== The Earth ===
| Episode | Original release date | Average audience share | | | | Ref. |
| Episode | Original release date | Nationwide All 15+ | Bangkok | BU | Rural | Ref. |
|---|---|---|---|---|---|---|
| 1 | 24 January 2026 | 1.92% | 1.60% | 1.73% | 2.07% | |
| 2 | 31 January 2026 | 1.89% | 1.42% | 1.40% | 2.18% | |
| 3 | 7 February 2026 | 1.67% | 1.35% | 1.44% | 1.83% | |
| 4 | 14 February 2026 | 1.87% | 1.24% | 1.95% | 2.00% | |
| 5 | 21 February 2026 | 1.72% | 1.26% | 1.23% | 2.02% | |
| 6 | 28 February 2026 | 1.61% | 1.17% | 1.33% | 1.83% | |
| 7 | 7 March 2026 | 1.58% | 1.36% | 0.87% | 1.88% | |
| 8 | 14 March 2026 | 1.90% | 0.72% | 1.64% | 2.29% | |
| Average | | 1.77% | 1.26% | 1.44% | 2.01% | |

=== The Water ===
| Episode | Original release date | Average audience share | | | | Ref. |
| Episode | Original release date | Nationwide All 15+ | Bangkok | BU | Rural | Ref. |
|---|---|---|---|---|---|---|
| 1 | 21 March 2026 | 1.69% | 0.77% | 1.50% | 1.98% | |
| 2 | 28 March 2026 | 1.38% | 0.97% | 1.05% | 1.60% | |
| 3 | 4 April 2026 | 1.61% | 0.74% | 1.64% | 1.81% | |
| 4 | 11 April 2026 | 1.29% | 1.08% | 0.82% | 1.52% | |
| 5 | 18 April 2026 | 1.90% | 1.52% | 1.66% | 2.07% | |
| 6 | 25 April 2026 | 1.53% | 0.76% | 0.93% | 1.94% | |
| 7 | 2 May 2026 | 1.87% | 1.03% | 1.26% | 2.30% | |
| 8 | 9 May 2026 | 1.78% | 0.92% | 1.70% | 2.04% | |
| Average | | 1.63% | 0.97% | 1.32% | 1.91% | |

=== The Air ===
| Episode | Original release date | Average audience share | | | | | Ref. |
| Episode | Original release date | Nationwide All 4+ | Nationwide 15+ | Bangkok | BU | Rural | Ref. |
|---|---|---|---|---|---|---|---|
| 1 | 16 May 2026 | 2.2% | 2.3% | 1.5% | 1.9% | 2.4% | |
| 2 | 23 May 2026 | 2.2% | 2.4% | 1.7% | 1.5% | 2.6% | |
| 3 | 30 May 2026 | 2.1% | 2.3% | 1.5% | 1.6% | 2.4% | |
| 4 | 6 June 2026 | 2.0% | 2.1% | 1.7% | 1.5% | 2.1% | |
| 5 | 13 June 2026 | 2.2% | 2.4% | 1.7% | 1.6% | 2.6% | |
| 6 | 20 June 2026 | 2.3% | 2.4% | 1.3% | 1.5% | 2.6% | |
| 7 | 27 June 2026 | 2.0% | 2.1% | 1.5% | 1.6% | 2.2% | |
| 8 | 4 July 2026 | 2.2% | 2.4% | 1.1% | 2.2% | 2.5% | |
| Average | | 2.0% | 2.3% | 1.5% | 1.6% | 2.4% | |

=== The Fire ===
| Episode | Original release date | Average audience share | | | | | Ref. |
| Episode | Original release date | Nationwide All 4+ | Nationwide All 15+ | Bangkok | BU | Rural | Ref. |
|---|---|---|---|---|---|---|---|
| 1 | 11 July 2026 | 2.5% | 2.7% | 1.2% | 2.5% | 2.8% | |
| 2 | 18 July 2026 | 2.3% | 2.4% | 1.6% | 2.2% | 2.5% | |
| 3 | 25 July 2026 | 2.3% | 2.4% | 1.6% | 1.9% | 2.5% | |
| 4 | 1 August 2026 | 2.1% | 2.1% | 1.2% | 2.1% | 2.3% | |
| 5 | 8 August 2026 | 1.9% | 2.0% | 1.5% | 1.3% | 2.1% | |
| 6 | 15 August 2026 | 2.1% | 2.2% | 1.5% | 1.4% | 2.4% | |
| 7 | 22 August 2026 | 1.8% | 2.0% | 1.0% | 1.3% | 2.1% | |
| 8 | 29 August 2026 | 2.4% | 2.5% | 1.6% | 1.8% | 2.7% | |
| Average | | 2.1% | 2.2% | 1.4% | 1.8% | 2.4% | |

== Awards and nominations ==
| Year | Award | Category | Nominees | Nominated work | Result | Ref. |
|---|---|---|---|---|---|---|
| 2026 | HUB Awards 2025 | Most Anticipated Premiere | Full Cast | 4 Elements | Won | |
| 2026 | Tpop Stage | Ost of the Week (week 10/2026) | Becky Rebecca | Don't You Love Me (4 Elements) | Won | |
| 2026 | Tpop Stage | Ost of the Week (week 11/2026) | Becky Rebecca | Don't You Love Me (4 Elements) | Nominated | |
| 2026 | Tpop Stage | Ost of the Week (week 12/2026) | Becky Rebecca | Don't You Love Me (4 Elements) | Nominated | |
| 2026 | Tpop Stage | Ost of the Week (week 13/2026) | Becky Rebecca | Don't You Love Me (4 Elements) | Nominated | |
| 2026 | Tpop Stage | Ost of the Week (week 21/2026) | Freen Sarocha | All For You (The Air) | Won | |
| 2026 | Tpop Stage | Ost of the Week (week 22/2026) | Freen Sarocha | All For You (The Air) | Nominated | |
| 2026 | Tpop Stage | Ost of the Week (week 23/2026) | Freen Sarocha | All For You (The Air) | Nominated | |
| 2026 | Tpop Stage | Ost of the Week (week 24/2026) | Freen Sarocha | All For You (The Air) | Nominated | |
| 2026 | Tpop Stage | Popular of the Week (week 24/2026) | Freen Sarocha | All For You (The Air) | Won | |
| 2026 | Tpop Stage | Ost of the Week (week 24/2026) | Becky Rebecca | Only You (The Air) | Nominated | |
| 2026 | Tpop Stage | Ost of the Week (week 25/2026) | Becky Rebecca | Only You (The Air) | Won | |
| 2026 | Tpop Stage | Popular of the Week (week 25/2026) | Becky Rebecca | Only You (The Air) | Won | |
| 2026 | Tpop Stage | Ost of the Week (week 26/2026) | Becky Rebecca | Only You (The Air) | Nominated | |
| 2026 | Tpop Stage | Ost of the Week (week 27/2026) | Becky Rebecca | Only You (The Air) | Nominated | |
| 2026 | Thailand Y Content Awards 2026 | Best Tourism Promotion | | The Earth | Nominated | |
| 2026 | Thailand Y Content Awards 2026 | Best Cinematography | | The Earth | Nominated | |
| 2026 | Thailand Y Content Awards 2026 | Best Supporting Actress | Natsinee Charoensitthisap | The Earth | Nominated | |
| 2026 | Thailand Y Content Awards 2026 | Best Actress | Engfa Waraha | The Water | Nominated | |
| 2026 | Thailand Y Content Awards 2026 | Best Costume Design | | The Water | Nominated | |
| 2026 | Pattaya International Film Festival 2026 | Outstanding Rising GL Actress | Lapisara Intarasut and Panthita Chencharoentham | The Earth | Won | |
| 2026 | Feed X Khaosod Awards 2026 | Nominees for Boys’ Love - Girls’ Love Series Director of the Year | Kittisak Cheewasatjasakun | 4 Elements | Nominated | |
| 2026 | Feed X Khaosod Awards 2026 | Popular Female Actress Award | Becky Rebecca | The Air | Nominated | |
| 2026 | Feed X Khaosod Awards 2026 | Popular Drama Awards | | The Air | Nominated | |
| 2026 | Maya TV Awards 2026 | Charming Woman of The Year | Engfa Waraha | The Water | Nominated | |
| 2026 | Maya TV Awards 2026 | Charming Woman of The Year | Freen Sarocha | The Air | Nominated | |
| 2026 | Maya TV Awards 2026 | Charming Woman of The Year | Becky Rebecca | The Air | Nominated | |
| 2026 | Maya TV Awards 2026 | Female Couple of The Year | Freen Sarocha and Becky Rebecca | The Air | Won | |
| 2026 | Maya TV Awards 2026 | Popular Vote | Freen Sarocha | The Air | Nominated | |
| 2026 | Maya TV Awards 2026 | Popular Vote | Becky Rebecca | The Air | Nominated | |
| 2026 | Howe Awards 2026 | The Best Couple Award | Engfa Waraha and Charlotte Austin | The Water | Nominated | |
| 2026 | Howe Awards 2026 | Hottest Actress Award | Charlotte Austin | The Water | Nominated | |
| 2026 | Howe Awards 2026 | Shining Female Drama Awards | Panthita Chencharoentham | The Earth | Nominated | |
| 2026 | Howe Awards 2026 | Shining Female Drama Awards | Michelle Behrmann | The Water | Won | |
| 2026 | BreakTudo Awards 2026 | GL Series of the Year | | The Air | Pending | |
| 2026 | BreakTudo Awards 2026 | International Crush | Freen Sarocha | The Air | Pending | |
| 2026 | BreakTudo Awards 2026 | International TV Star | Becky Rebecca | The Air | Pending | |
| 2026 | The Viral Hits Awards | People’s Choice - Leading Actress of the Year | Freen Sarocha | The Air | Pending | |
| 2026 | The Viral Hits Awards | People’s Choice - Leading Actress of the Year | Becky Rebecca | The Air | Pending | |
| 2026 | The Viral Hits Awards | People’s Choice - Supporting Actress of the Year | Orntara Poolsak | The Air | Pending | |
| 2026 | NPBL Choice Awards | GL Couple of the Year | Milin Watinthanakit and Kanteera Wadcharathadsanakul | The Fire | Pending | |

== Listicles ==
| Year | Publisher | Listicle | Character/Artist | Nominated work | Placement | Ref. |
|---|---|---|---|---|---|---|
| 2026 | Lesbocine | Top Sapphic Characters 2026 | Lom | The Air | 2nd place | |
| 2026 | Lesbocine | Top Sapphic Characters 2026 | Blew | The Air | 3rd place | |
| 2026 | Lesbocine | Top Sapphic Characters 2026 | Lada | The Water | 7th place | |
| 2026 | Lesbocine | Top Sapphic Characters 2026 | Fai | The Fire | 11th place | |
| 2026 | Lesbocine | Top Sapphic Characters 2026 | Din | The Earth | 12th place | |
| 2026 | Lesbocine | Top Sapphic Characters 2026 | Rose | The Earth | 20th place | |
| 2026 | Lesbocine | Top Sapphic Characters 2026 | Nam | The Water | 22th place | |
| 2026 | Lesbocine | Top Sapphic Characters 2026 | Kaphrao | The Fire | 34th place | |

== Events ==
| Year | Day/month | Name | City | Country | Location | Ref. |
|---|---|---|---|---|---|---|
| 2025 | 25 April | 4 Elements: The Global Phenomenon of Girl Love | Bangkok | Thailand | River Park at Iconsiam | |
| 2025 | 04 July | Opening Ceremony 4 Elements บ้านวาทินวณิช | Bangkok | Thailand | Chulalongkorn University Centenary Park | |
| 2026 | 11 January | 4 Elements: The Grand Unveiling | Bangkok | Thailand | Union Hall, Union Mall | |
| 2026 | 14 March | วิวาห์ปฐพี The Final Episode | Bangkok | Thailand | Major Cineplex Ratchayothin | |
| 2026 | 21 March | นทีร้อยเล่ห์ First Episode Premiere | Bangkok | Thailand | Siam Pavalai, Siam Paragon | |
| 2026 | 09 May | นทีร้อยเล่ห์ The Final Episode | Bangkok | Thailand | Siam Pavalai, Siam Paragon | |
| 2026 | 06 June | เสน่หาวาโย Episode 4 Premiere Event | Bangkok | Thailand | Siam Pavalai, Siam Paragon | |
| 2026 | 04 July | เสน่หาวาโย Final Episode Event | Bangkok | Thailand | Siam Pavalai, Siam Paragon | |
| 2026 | 11 July | โซ่รักอัคนี First Episode Premiere Event | Bangkok | Thailand | Major Cineplex Ratchayothin | |
| 2026 | 29 August | โซ่รักอัคนี The Final Episode | Bangkok | Thailand | Siam Pavalai, Siam Paragon | |
| 2026 | 12 Sept | 4 Elements:Infinite Bonds Fanmeeting | Bangkok | Thailand | Union Hall, Union Mall | |

Note1: During 4 Elements: The Grand Unveiling Becky Armstrong wasn't present due to overseas work.
