= Miss Grand Bangkok =

Provincial pageant in Bangkok, Thailand

Miss Grand Krungthep Maha Nakhon มิสแกรนด์กรุงเทพมหานคร
- Formation: April 16, 2016; 10 years ago
- Founder: Russamee Tongsiripaisri
- Type: Beauty pageant
- Headquarters: Bangkok
- Location: Thailand
- Members: Miss Grand Thailand
- Official language: Thai
- Provincial Director: Rucharin Udmuangkham

Summary result of Bangkok representatives at Miss Grand Thailand
Placement	Number(s)
Winner	1
1st runner-up	0
2nd runner-up	1
3rd runner-up	0
4th runner-up	1
5th runner-up	1
Top 10/11/12	2
Top 20	1
Unplaced	2

Miss Grand Bangkok or Miss Grand Krung Thep Maha Nakhon (Thai: มิสแกรนด์กรุงเทพมหานคร) is a Thai provincial beauty pageant which selects a representative from Bangkok for the Miss Grand Thailand national competition, founded in 2016 by a Bangkok-based model and actress Russamee Tongsiripaisri.

Since the first competition in the Miss Grand Thailand pageant in 2016, Bangkok's representatives won the main title once; in 2022, obtained by Engfa Waraha, and was named the second runner-up once; in 2023, by Pimjira Jaroenlak.

== History ==
In 2016, after Miss Grand Thailand began franchising the provincial competitions to individual organizers, who would name seventy-seven provincial titleholders to compete in the national pageant, the license for Bangkok was purchased by a model and actress, Russamee Tongsiripaisri, who later organized the first Miss Grand Bangkok competition on 16 April 2016, in which a University of the Thai Chamber of Commerce student, Wisumitra Prayoonphan, was elected as the first Miss Grand Bangkok titleholder. Tongsiripaisri relinquished the franchise to an actress Anyarin Terathananpat in 2019.

The pageant was skipped once; in 2021, due to the COVID-19 pandemic in Thailand, the national organizer was unable to organize the national event, and the country representative for the international tournament was appointed instead.

Winner gallery

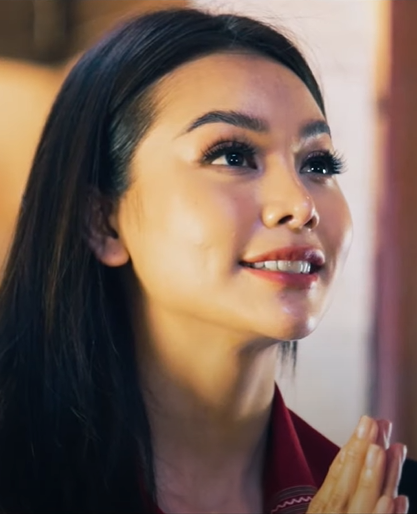
Engfa Waraha
Miss Grand Bangkok 2022

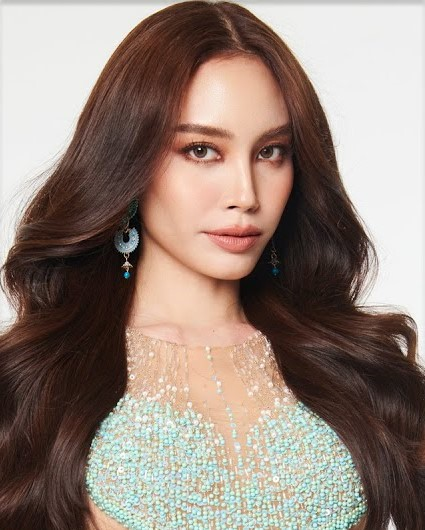
Pimjira Jaroenlak
Miss Grand Bangkok 2023

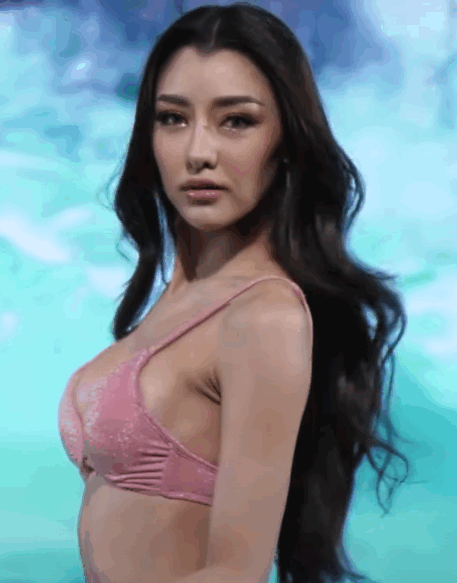
Yuwaporn Songngam
Miss Grand Bangkok 2024

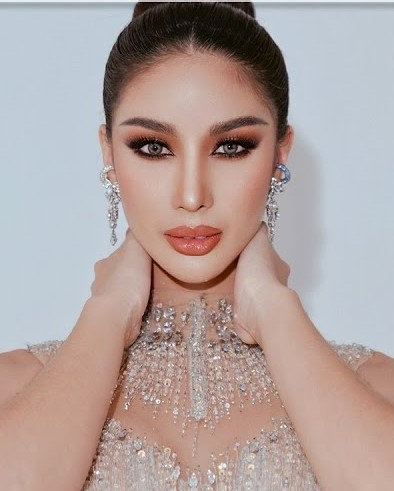
Khanaporn Phatthanaphan
Miss Grand Bangkok 2025

== Editions ==
The following table details Miss Grand Bangkok's annual editions since 2016.

Edition	Date	Final venue	Entrants	Winner	Ref.
1st	16 April 2016	Dusit Hall, Dusit Thani Hotel, Pathum Wan, Bangkok	18	Wisumitra Prayoonphan	
2nd	23 April 2017	Dusit Hall, Dusit Thani Hotel, Pathum Wan, Bangkok	20	Jessica Espiner	
3rd	1 April 2018	Dusit Hall, Dusit Thani Hotel, Pathum Wan, Bangkok	20	Kachanich Ariyasiriphuvadej	
4th	24 May 2019	MCC Hall, The Mall Bangkapi, Bang Kapi, Bangkok	15	Natsuda Termjai	
5th	1 August 2020	Mirinn Show Theater, Bang Kapi, Bangkok	41	Suphatra Kliangprom	
6th	6 February 2022	ESC Park Hotel, Khlong Luang, Pathum Thani	14	Engfa Waraha	
7th	11 September 2023	TVT Green Park Studio, Saphan Sung, Bangkok	18	Pimjira Jaroenlak	
8th	15 September 2024	MGI Hall, Show DC Megacomplex, Bangkok	22	Yuwaporn Songngam	
9th	2 December 2025	AVA Trivi Studio, Pak Kret, Nonthaburi	14	Khanaporn Phatthanaphan	
10th	2026	The Royal City Hotel Bang Phlat, Bangkok		Pitchayawi Yokoyama	

== National competition ==
The following is a list of Bangkok representatives who competed at the Miss Grand Thailand pageant.

Year	Representative		Original provincial title	Placements	Provincial director	Ref.
Year	Romanized name	Thai name	Original provincial title	Placements	Provincial director	Ref.
2016	Wisumitra Prayoonphan	วิสุมิตรา ประยูรพันธ์	Miss Grand Bangkok 2016	Top 20	Russamee Tongsiripaisri	
2017	Jessica Espiner	เจสสิกา เอสพินเนอร์	Miss Grand Bangkok 2017	Top 12	Russamee Tongsiripaisri	
2018	Kachanich Ariyasiriphuvadej	กชณิช อริยสิริภูวเดช	Miss Grand Bangkok 2018	Unplaced	Russamee Tongsiripaisri	
2019	Natsuda Termjai	ณัฐสุดา เติมใจ	Miss Grand Bangkok 2019	Unplaced	Anyarin Terathananpat	
2020	Suphatra Kliangprom	สุภัทรา เกลี้ยงพร้อม	Miss Grand Bangkok 2020	Top 10	Sarannaphat Srisawat	
2022	Engfa Waraha	อิงฟ้า วราหะ	Miss Grand Bangkok 2022	Winner	Soraya Pratsachaksattru	
2023	Pimjira Jaroenlak	พิมพ์จิรา เจริญลักษณ์	Miss Grand Bangkok 2023	2nd runner-up	Soraya Pratsachaksattru	
2024	Yuwaporn Songngam	ยุวภรณ์ ทรงงาม	Miss Grand Bangkok 2024	5th runners-up	Rucharin Udmuangkham	
2025	Khanaporn Phatthanaphan	คณาพร พัฒนพันธ์	Miss Grand Bangkok 2025	4th runner-up	Thanat Bunsemsem and Chudaphan Kantaphom	
2026	Pitchayawi Yokoyama	พิชญาวี โยโกยาม่า	Miss Grand Bangkok 2026	5th runners-up		
