= Petrichor The Series =

2024 Thai television series

- Official series poster
- Thai: หยดฝนกลิ่นสนิม
- Genre: Girls' love; Mystery thriller
- Based on: Petrichor: Rust in the Rain by SIXTEENSEVEN
- Directed by: Pannares Ruchirananta; Pongsatorn Thongjareon
- Starring: Engfa Waraha; Charlotte Austin
- Country of origin: Thailand
- Original language: Thai
- No. of episodes: 10

Original release
- Network: ONE31; iQIYI
- Release: 25 November 2024 – 1 February 2025

Petrichor The Series (Thai: หยดฝนกลิ่นสนิม; RTGS: Yod Fon Klin Sanim; also known as Petrichor: The Scent of Rain) is a 2024 Thai mystery thriller television series starring Engfa Waraha and Charlotte Austin as Inspector Tul and Dr Cherran, adapted from the novel Petrichor: Rust in the Rain by SIXTEENSEVEN. It is directed by Pannares Ruchirananta and Pongsatorn Thongjareon, and is one of several collaborative Thai girls' love projects between Waraha and Austin, also known as "Englot", others being Show Me Love, Club Friday Night: Love Bully, Unlimited Love, and 4 Elements: The Water.

The series also stars other past Thai national beauty pageant winners in supporting roles, such as Vanessa Herrmann (Miss Thailand World 2012), Malin Sae-lim (Miss Grand Thailand 2024), and Rina Chatamonchai (Miss Grand Thailand 2023 5th Runner Up). It has 10 episodes, and premiered on 23 November 2024 on ONE31 and iQIYI, and concluded on 1 February 2025.

== Synopsis ==
Rookie officer Inspector Tul from the Special Investigations Department joins forces with forensic doctor Cherran when a wealthy businessman's son was found dead in a car explosion. Their personalities and attitudes cannot be any more different, but when the 'Raindrop Killer', a serial killer from 18 years ago resurfaces, they gradually learn to trust each other as they work together to deliver justice to the victim's families.

== Cast and Characters ==
=== Main ===
- Engfa Waraha as Tul Chanwimol, an inspector from the Special Investigations Department.
- Charlotte Austin as Cherran Trakulwipatkul, a forensics doctor who has a history with the Raindrop Killer.

=== Supporting ===
- Malin Sae-Lim (Lin) as May, Cherran's colleague.
- Rina Chatamonchai (Meena) as Captain Jiu, part of Tul's team.
- Vanessa Herrmann (Na-Chatra) as Thiwa, a reporter and Charran's close friend.
- Naphat Vikairungroj (Na) as Tin Chanwimol, Tul's older brother and bakery shop owner
- Nattapol Diloknawarit (Max) as Kawin, Tin's close friend from a wealthy family
- Akarin Akaranithimetrad (Joke) as Wisut, the alleged Raindrop Killer who was released from prison after 18 years
- Athiwad Sanidwong Na Ayoodthayaa (Ton) as Big Tech, a Lieutenant General in the police force
- Khomkrit Duangsuwan (Parn) as Daensiam, an inspector in Tul's department
- Tha Thep Chaichanbutr (David) as Phicet, a Major General in the police force and Tul's superior officer
- Pruet Nakprad (Pluto) as Seargent Phu, part of Tul's team
- Kittiphong Dumaviphat (Kroi) as Doctor Rak, Cherran's father and forensics doctor
- Naphat Chalermphonphakdee (Inntouch) as Athit, a pub owner and suspect in the Raindrop Killer case

=== Guest ===
- Alissa Intusmith (Yuyee) as Tul and Tin's mother
- Marisa Anita Fandeurwawdeu as Cherran's mother and Rak's wife
