= Charlotte Austin (Thai actress) =

Thai-British actress, model, singer, and beauty pageant titleholder

- ชาล็อต ออสติน
- Charlotte Austin at Thailand Box Office Award 2025
- Born: 21 December 1998 (age 27); Phuket, Thailand
- Education: Prince of Songkla University
- Occupations: Beauty pageant titleholder; Actress; Model; Singer
- Years active: 2022–present
- Agent: MGI
- Height: 1.73 m (5 ft 8 in)
- Title: Miss Grand Phuket 2022 (1st Runner-up); Miss Grand Chumphon 2022 (Winner); Miss Grand Thailand 2022 (5th Runner-up)

Thanwarat Charlotte Louise Austin (Thai: ธัญวรัตน์ ชาล็อต ลูอิส ออสติน; born 21 December 1998), known professionally as Charlotte Austin (Thai: ชาล็อต ออสติน), is a Thai-British actress, model, singer, and beauty pageant titleholder. She rose to prominence after placing fifth runner-up at Miss Grand Thailand 2022 and subsequently gained recognition for her television roles in Show Me Love (2023), Falling in Love (2024), Petrichor (2024), and 4 Elements: The Water (2026).

== Early life and education ==
Austin was born on 21 December 1998 in Phuket, Thailand, to a British father and a Thai mother. She has three older half-brothers. Following her parents' separation during her childhood, she divided her time between Phuket and Chumphon province, and was primarily raised by her father, a former soldier who worked as an English teacher in Phuket, while her mother worked abroad. During university, she supported herself by working as a freelance model and waitress.

She attended Kajonkiet Suksa School for her secondary education. In 2022, she graduated with a Bachelor of Arts in Tourism Management from the Faculty of Hospitality and Tourism at Prince of Songkla University's Phuket campus.

== Career ==
=== 2017–2022: Pageantry ===
Austin began competing in beauty pageants in 2017 at the Miss Supranational Phuket pageant. In February 2022, she placed first runner-up at Miss Grand Phuket behind Heidi Amanda Jensen. She subsequently won the Miss Grand Chumphon 2022 title, qualifying to represent the province at Miss Grand Thailand 2022, where she finished as fifth runner-up. Following the pageant, she signed with Miss Grand International (MGI) and frequently collaborated with pageant winner Engfa Waraha on commercial endorsements, live events, and television projects.

=== 2023–present: Acting and solo work ===
Austin made her acting debut in the 2023 girls' love television series Show Me Love, starring opposite Waraha. In early 2024, she played the lead role of Thongkwao alongside Suppasit Jongcheveevat in Channel 3's remake of the musical drama Mon Rak Luk Thung, titled Falling in Love. Later that year, she reunited with Waraha in One 31's anthology series Club Friday The Series: Hot Love Issue - Love Bully, and starred as forensic physician Dr. Cheran Trakulwipatkul in the crime thriller Petrichor (2024).

In 2025, she appeared in the sitcom Unlimited Love. The following year, she starred as Chonlada in the anthology project 4Elements, leading its third installment, The Water. Alongside her acting work, Austin has performed at solo events as well as international concerts and fan meetings with Waraha across Asia, Europe, and the Americas. In 2026, she also embarked on a solo Asian fan meeting tour, Here With You Asia Tour 2026. In August 2026, Austin announced that she would not renew her contract with MGI upon its expiration in April 2027, choosing to pursue an independent career.

== Personal life ==
Austin has spoken publicly about her experiences with panic disorder and depression to promote mental health awareness. In December 2024, she lost 4 million baht in a call-center scam in which perpetrators impersonated law enforcement officers. In May 2025, the Criminal Court convicted four defendants in the case and ordered them to repay the stolen funds.

== Filmography ==
=== Television series ===
Year	Title	Role	Notes	Ref.
2023	Show Me Love	Cherine	Main role	
2024	Falling in Love	Thongkwao	Main role	
2024	Club Friday Season 16: Hot Love Issue	Irene	Main role	
2024	Petrichor	Doc Ran / Cherran	Main role	
2025	Unlimited Love	Ray / Leliya Airmes	Main role	
2025	ClaireBell	—N/a	Guest role	
2026	4 Elements: The Earth	Lada / Chonlada Kunanon	Supporting role	
2026	4 Elements: The Water	Lada / Chonlada Kunanon	Main role	
2026	4 Elements: The Air	Lada / Chonlada Kunanon	Supporting role	
2026	4 Elements: The Fire	Lada / Chonlada Kunanon	Supporting role	

=== Music video appearances ===
Year	Title	Artist	Ref.
2023	"เขาคือมีใหม่ไวแท้"	Ning Eileen	
2023	"พี่ชาย"	Ble Patumrach R Siam	

== Discography ==
=== Soundtrack appearances ===
Year	Title	Album	Ref.
2023	"อยากให้รู้ว่ารักเธอ (When I Fall In Love)" (with Engfa Waraha)	Show Me Love OST	
2023	"มาตามสัญญา" (with Mew Suppasit)	Falling in Love OST	
2024	"รักเธอที่สุด"	Falling in Love OST	
2026	"โชคดีที่สุดเลย (Lucky Me)"	4 Elements: The Water OST	

== Concerts and fan meetings ==
=== Joint and guest appearances ===
Year	Date	Event	Country	Venue	Notes	Ref.
2023	23 July	ENGLOT 1st Fan Meet in Manila	Philippines	New Frontier Theater, Manila	With Engfa Waraha	
2023	23 October	The Grand Concert ENGFA Live in Vietnam	Vietnam	Phu Tho Indoor Stadium, Ho Chi Minh City	Guest	
2023	22 November	Woody FM on Stage with Engfa and Charlotte	Thailand	True Icon Hall, Bangkok	With Engfa Waraha	
2024	5 March	Miss Grand Thailand 2024 Welcome Ceremony	Thailand	MGI Hall, Bangkok	—N/a	
2024	24 March	The Grand Concert Live in Phuket	Thailand	Phuket	With Engfa Waraha	
2024	11–12 May	The Grand Concert ENGLOT USA Tour 2024	United States	SOB's, New York City	With Engfa Waraha	
2024	15–16 May	The Grand Concert ENGLOT USA Tour 2024	United States	Dulles International Event Center, Washington, D.C.	With Engfa Waraha	
2024	17–18 May	The Grand Concert ENGLOT USA Tour 2024	United States	La Scala de Miami, Miami	With Engfa Waraha	
2024	20 May	The Grand Concert ENGLOT USA Tour 2024	United States	Zapverr Thai Restaurant & Lounge, Washington, D.C.	With Engfa Waraha	
2024	22 May	The Grand Concert ENGLOT USA Tour 2024	United States	The Vermont Hollywood, Los Angeles	With Engfa Waraha	
2024	25 May	The Grand Concert ENGLOT USA Tour 2024	United States	Stones Gambling Hall, Sacramento	With Engfa Waraha	
2024	29 May	The Grand Concert ENGLOT USA Tour 2024	United States	Holiday Inn Event Hall, Dallas	With Engfa Waraha	
2024	3 September	Petrichor The Series Press Conference	Thailand	MGI Hall, Bangkok	With Petrichor cast	
2024	17 November	Englot 1st Fan Meeting in Bangkok	Thailand	MGI Hall, Bangkok	With Engfa Waraha	
2025	20 June	Astral Dreamgate: EngLot 1st Fan Meeting in Mexico & Brazil	Mexico	Circo Volador, Mexico City	With Engfa Waraha	
2025	22 June	Astral Dreamgate: EngLot 1st Fan Meeting in Mexico & Brazil	Brazil	Terra SP, São Paulo	With Engfa Waraha	
2025	13 September	The Englot Infinity Europe Tour	Spain	Teatre Auditori de Sant Cugat, Sant Cugat del Vallès	With Engfa Waraha	
2025	16 September	The Englot Infinity Europe Tour	France	Bouillon République, Paris	With Engfa Waraha	
2025	20 September	The Englot Infinity Europe Tour	United Kingdom	The Drum Wembley, London	With Engfa Waraha	

=== Solo ===
Year	Date	Event	Country	Venue	Ref.
2023	31 March	The Grand Concert Charlotte Possible	Thailand	MGI Hall, Bangkok	
2024	17 August	The Grand Concert Charlotte Possible 2: The Magical Moment	Thailand	MGI Hall, Bangkok	
2026	29 August	Here With You Asia Tour 2026	China	Shanghai	
2026	20 September	Here With You Asia Tour 2026	Thailand	Bangkok	
2026	31 October	Here With You Asia Tour 2026	Philippines	Manila	
2026	14 November	Here With You Asia Tour 2026	Taiwan	Taipei	

== Awards and nominations ==
Year	Award	Category	Nominated work	Result	Ref.
2022	KAZZ Awards	Popular Girls of the Year	—N/a	Won	
2022	KAZZ Awards	Most Trending on Social Media (with Engfa Waraha)	—N/a	Won	
2023	KAZZ Awards	Popular Female Teenage Award	—N/a	Won	
2023	KAZZ Awards	Rising Female of the Year	—N/a	Nominated	
2023	KAZZ Awards	Couple of the Year (with Engfa Waraha)	—N/a	Nominated	
2024	KAZZ Awards	Popular Female Teenage Award	—N/a	Nominated	
2024	KAZZ Awards	Couple of the Year (with Engfa Waraha)	—N/a	Nominated	
2025	KAZZ Awards	Shining Star of the Year (Female)	—N/a	Won	
2025	Bangkok Pride Awards	Pride Popular of Sapphic Series Star	—N/a	Nominated	
2025	Thailand Box Office Awards	Couple of the Year (with Engfa Waraha)	—N/a	Won	
2025	Thailand Box Office Awards	Girl Love Series of the Year	Petrichor	Won	
2025	HUB Awards	Best Performance: Couple (GL) (with Engfa Waraha)	Petrichor	Won	
