= The Voice Thailand season 7 =

The Voice Thailand
- Season 7
- Hosted by: Songsit Rungnopphakhunsi
- Coaches: Saharat Sangkapreecha; Jennifer Kim; Joey Boy; Pop Pongkool
- Winner: Pongsatorn Kambang
- Winning coach: Joey Boy
- Runner-up: Onratda Rojjanatechasiri

Release
- Original network: PPTV and LINE TV
- Original release: 19 November 2018 – 4 March 2019

Season chronology
- ← Previous; Season 6 Next → Season 8

The seventh season of the Thai reality television show, The Voice Thailand premiered on November 19, 2018, on PPTV and LINE TV. The show was hosted by Songsit Rungnopphakhunsi on PPTV and LINE TV.

== Teams ==
Color key

- Winner
- Runner-up
- Eliminated in the Final
- Eliminated in the Playoffs
- Eliminated in the Battles
- Stolen in the Knockouts
- Eliminated in the Knockouts

Coaches	Top 48 artists			
Kong Saharat
Kong Saharat	Onratda Rojjanatechasiri (Nissnueng)	Apisit Suriwong (Sefe)	Alongkorn Sirimahaweero (Plug)	Aree Rueangsawat (Boss)
Kong Saharat	Anil Suwannachot	Chonlatorn Wajisattayanurak (Cherry)	Piangpen Bunkaeo (Taew)	Thanaphat Peanchompoo (Foofoo)
Kong Saharat	~~Ittiphon Photichai (M)~~	Archanai Thamniyai (Joe)	Karun Satchadewa (Run)	Pimnipha & Narissara (Namoon & May)
Kong Saharat	Pradutphon Khamklom (Zai)	Yanin Chotisut (Tu)		
Jennifer Kim
Jennifer Kim	Wathanyoo Pringhatyai (Pok)	Ekkarat Phonsri (Ou)	Thatsanai Kittirungsuwan (Tao)	Thitiyakorn Thongsri (Pim)
Jennifer Kim	Ittiphon Photichai (M)	Jetsada Trirungkit (Aun)	Matwakarn Thongkham (Ammy)	Saharat O'Leary (Kevin)
Jennifer Kim	~~Chonlatorn Wajisattayanurak (Cherry)~~	~~Hathaikarn Klahan (Pudthai)~~	~~Kewalin Wongjai (Mew)~~	~~Wanchaleom Luangprathum (Aemmy)~~
Jennifer Kim	Naphatsanan Natthawuttisit (Hong)	Praiwan Srikam (Se)		
Joey Boy
Joey Boy	Pongsatorn Kambang (Lek)	Wanchaleom Luangprathum (Aemy)	Buma & Suphamet (Danny & Pipe)	Worraruethai Phakdiwijit (Nueng)
Joey Boy	Benyada Thawornset (Ben)	Hathaikarn Klahan (Pudthai)	Monsit Suansri (Ped)	Natnatcha Namchareonsombut (Ann)
Joey Boy	~~Aree Rueangsawat (Boss)~~	~~Tipphayaphon Wiyasing (Puifai)~~	Apinya Lohirun (Ice)	Chananai Sukhawat (Jet'aime)
Joey Boy	Ingfa Waraha	Natwadee Khambenja (Tatcher)		
Pop Pongkool
Pop Pongkool	Areeya Rotjanadit (Lookpla)	Jakkrit Khamjit (Joey Phuwasit)	Sayapha Singchu (Tangmo)	Nutprawe & Khrongkwan ^{a}
Pop Pongkool	Kewalin Wongjai (Mew)	Nathee Sinchanya (Earth)	Tipphayaphon Wiyasing (Puifai)	~~Wathanyoo Pringhatyai (Pok)~~
Pop Pongkool	Alisa Nutiam (Tess)	Jittanit Panitwit (Numchum)	Phatiya Tuadsuwan (Mark)	Phonsawan Yanwaro (Bungkee)
Pop Pongkool	Phurithat Piyasattanti (Boom)			
Pop Pongkool	Note:Italicized names are stolen contestants (names struck through within former teams)			

- ^a Nutprawe & Khrongkwan originally were solo artist but Pop Pongkool chose both of them to advance as a duo in the Battles.

== Blind auditions ==
The Voice of Thailand Season 7 has added a new rule in the Blind Audition to the Blocked Button, which is a button that can block the chair coaches do not turn to choose the same contestant. The contestants will not be able to select the coach that has blocked the chair. This rule was created to create a rut for the coach.

Color key

Coach pressed "I WANT YOU" button
Coach pressed the "I WANT YOU" button, but was "blocked" by Kong from getting the artist
Coach pressed the "I WANT YOU" button, but was "blocked" by Kim from getting the artist
Coach pressed the "I WANT YOU" button, but was "blocked" by Joey from getting the artist
Coach pressed the "I WANT YOU" button, but was "blocked" by Pop from getting the artist
Artist defaulted to a coach's team
Artist elected a coach's team
Artist was eliminated with no coach pressing their button

=== Episode 1 (November 19) ===
Coaches' Performance - คนไม่เข้าตา

Order	Artist	Age	Hometown	Song	Coach's and artist's choices			
Order	Artist	Age	Hometown	Song	Kong	Kim	Joey	Pop
1	Archanai Thamniyai (Joe)	22	Nakhon Ratchasima	"Sweet Home Alabama"		—	—	
2	Areeya Rotjanadit (Lookpla)	23	Nakhon Pathom	"Il dolce suono" & "The Diva Dance"				
3	Yanin Chotisut (Tu)	51	Phatthalung	"น้ำตาลาไทร"		—	—	—
4	Thanaphat Peanchompoo (Foofoo)	36	Roi Et	"โอ๊ะ...โอ๊ย"				—
5	Krittabun Ronruen	71	Bangkok	"Beyond the Sea"	—	—	—	—
6	Chonlatorn Wajisattayanurak (Cherry)	28	Bangkok	"กลัว"			—	—
7	Benyada Thawornset (Ben)	25	Bangkok	"Dream a Little Dream of Me"	—	—		—
8	Nathee Sinchanya (Earth)	24	Sakon Nakhon	"เมืองชุดดำ"	—	—		
9	Buma Derrick (Danny) & Suphamet Petch-udom (Pipe)	28	Cameroon & Phetchabun	"ห่อหมกฮวกไปฝากป้า"	—	—		—

=== Episode 2 (November 26) ===
Order	Artist	Age	Hometown	Song	Coach's and artist's choices			
Order	Artist	Age	Hometown	Song	Kong	Kim	Joey	Pop
1	Apinya Lohirun (Ice)	27	Bangkok	"ไหง่ง่อง"		—		
2	Phurithat Piyasattanti (Boom)	26	Bangkok	"When You Got a Good Friend"	—	—	—	
3	Thatsanai Kittirungsuwan (Tao)	21	Ratchaburi	"ตายทั้งเป็น"	—			—
4	Jom-anon Chareonwaisanit	37	Prachaup Kirikhan	"ไว้ใจ"	—	—	—	—
5	Sayapha Singchu (Tangmo)	17	Krabi	"ออเจ้าเอย"; Love Destiny OST	—		—	
6	Saharat O'Leary (Kevin)	15	Nakhon Ratchasima	"เสมอ"	—		—	—
7	Anil Suwannachot	34	Kamphaengphet	"ช้ำคือเรา"		—	—	—
8	Aree Rueangsawat (Boss)	24	Udon Thani	"Sunday Morning"				
9	Pongsatorn Kambang (Lek)	24	Phetchaburi	"อกหักเพราะรักเมีย"				

=== Episode 3 (December 3) ===
Order	Artist	Age	Hometown	Song	Coach's and artist's choices			
Order	Artist	Age	Hometown	Song	Kong	Kim	Joey	Pop
1	Monsit Suansri (Ped)	21	Narathiwat	"เกลียดห้องเบอร์ห้า"		—		—
2	Kritsana Raknak	35	Phitsanulok	"ฤดูที่แตกต่าง"	—	—	—	—
3	Karun Satchadewa (Run)	21	Khonkaen	"เจ็บจุงเบย"		—		
4	Jetsada Trirungkit (Aun)	24	Bangkok	"Paris In the Rain"	—		—	—
5	Tipphayaphon Wiyasing (Puifai)	20	Nakhon Sithammarat	"แต่งงานกันเฮอะ"				
6	Natchanon Suphalak	25	Suphanburi	"รู้สึกไหม"	—	—	—	—
7	Alongkorn Sirimahaweero (Plug)	31	Songkhla	"คาถามหานิยม"		—	—	—
8	Piangpen Bunkaeo (Taew)	27	Nonthaburi	"มีเธอ"		—	—	—
9	Ekkarat Phonsri (Ou)	30	Sathun	"คนมีเสน่ห์"			—	—
10	Jakkrit Khamjit (Joey Phuwasit)	22	Roi Et	"เคลิ้ม"	—	—	—	

=== Episode 4 (December 10) ===
Order	Artist	Age	Hometown	Song	Coach's and artist's choices			
Order	Artist	Age	Hometown	Song	Kong	Kim	Joey	Pop
1	Naphatsanan Natthawuttisit (Hong)	17	Phuket	"Can't Take My Eyes Off You"				
2	Sompong Lakornchai	26	Nongkhai	"สิ่งมีชีวิตที่เรียกว่าหัวใจ"	—	—	—	—
3	Matwakarn Thongkham (Ammy)	28	Pathum Thani	"The Game of Love"	—		—	—
4	Kitti Chareonkham	30	Chonburi	"10 Things"	—	—	—	—
5	Worraruethai Phakdiwijit (Nueng)	53	Bangkok	"ทางของฝุ่น"	—	—		—
6	Pradutphon Khamklom (Zai)	27	Chonburi	"ก็เลิกกันแล้ว"		—	—	—
7	Phonsawan Yanwaro (Bungkee)	18	Chachoengsao	"ภาพจำ"	—		—	
8	Ittiphon Photichai (M)	26	Chanthaburi	"เหล้าจ๋า"		—	—	—
9	Wanchaleom Luangprathum (Aemmy)	25	Nakhon Pathom	"ใบไม้"	—		—	—
10	Saksit Khamloet	35	Amnat Chareon	"ปั้นปึง"	—	—	—	—
11	Hathaikarn Klahan (Pudthai)	17	Phra Nakhon Si Ayutthaya	"หญิงลั้ลลา"	—		—	—

=== Episode 5 (December 17) ===
Order	Artist	Age	Hometown	Song	Coach's and artist's choices			
Order	Artist	Age	Hometown	Song	Kong	Kim	Joey	Pop
1	Khrongkwan Wankhanongkit (Ink)	16	Nonthaburi	"Best Part"	—	—		
2	Pongphisut Khumthong	25	Surin	"ปราสาททราย"	—	—	—	—
3	Pimnipha Jangthaisong (Namoon) & Narissara Rattanapanya (May)	21	Bangkok & Suphanburi	"ก่อนฤดูฝน"		—	—	—
4	Chananai Sukhawat (Jet'aime)	25	Bangkok	"Somewhere Over the Rainbow"		—		
5	Wathanyoo Pringhatyai (Pok)	25	Surat Thani	"บอกตัวเอง"	—	—	—	
6	Thawichai Yawilat	19	Chiang Mai	"พบกันใหม่?"	—	—	—	—
7	Praiwan Srikam (Se)	42	Si Saket	"เต้ยสาวจันทร์กั้งโกบ"	—		—	—
8	Natnatcha Namchareonsombut (Ann)	29	Bangkok	"ชั่วฟ้าดินสลาย"	—	—		—
9	Sarawut Samon	24	Kamphaengphet	"ฝันลำเอียง"	—	—	—	—
10	Engfa Waraha	23	Uthai Thani	"อยากเจอคนจริงใจ"	—	—		—
11	Thitiyakorn Thongsri (Pim)	22	Ubon Ratchathani	"ศัตรูที่รัก"	—		—	—

=== Episode 6 (December 24) ===
Order	Artist	Age	Hometown	Song	Coach's and artist's choices			
Order	Artist	Age	Hometown	Song	Kong	Kim	Joey	Pop
1	Apisit Suriwong (Sefe)	17	Bangkok	"เรียนและงาน"		—	—	—
2	Chatmongkol Wongsritha	29	Amnat Chareon	"ยินดี"	—	—	—	—
3	Jittanit Panitwit (Numchum)	30	Chonburi	"Bang Bang"		—		
4	Phatiya Tuadsuwan (Mark)	29	Nakhon Ratchasima	"หมดเวลา"	—	—	—	
5	Kewalin Wongjai (Mew)	22	Lampang	"If I Ain't Got You"	—		—	—
6	Natwadee Khambenja (Tatcher)	20	Bangkok	"โอ๊ย..โอ๊ย"	—	Team full		—
7	Alisa Nutiam (Tess)	31	Bangkok	"Lost Stars"		Team full	Team full	
8	Sittichok Tasa	19	Chiang Mai	"คิดถึงนะ"	—	Team full	Team full	—
9	Nutprawe Khongrod (Mew)	17	Bangkok	"The Power of Love"	—	Team full	Team full	
10	Worraphon Sanphanit & Worraphan Thongra-ar	22 & 18	Chonburi	"(They Long to Be) Close to You"	—	Team full	Team full	Team full
11	Onratda Rojjanatechasiri (Nissnueng)	25	Phitsanulok	"น้ำตาจระเข้"		Team full	Team full	Team full

== The Knockouts ==
Color key:

Artist won the Knockouts and advanced to the Battles
Artist lost the Knockouts but was stolen by another coach and advanced to the Battles
Artist lost the Knockouts and was eliminated

Episode	Order	Coach	Song	Artists		Song	'Steal' result			
Episode	Order	Coach	Song	Winner	Loser	Song	Kong	Kim	Joey	Pop
Episode 7 (Monday, January 7)	1	Jennifer Kim	"ไม่หลับไม่นอน"	Saharat O'Leary (Kevin)	Naphatsanan Natthawuttisit (Hong)	"เรื่องจริง"	—	—N/a	—	—
Episode 7 (Monday, January 7)	2	Pop Pongkool	"อังกอร์"	Areeya Rotjanadit (Lookpla)	Phurithat Piyasattanti (Boom)	"When a Man Loves a Woman"	—	—	—	—N/a
Episode 7 (Monday, January 7)	3	Joey Boy	"ในคืนที่เราเจอะเจอกันครั้งแรก"	Benyada Thawornset (Ben)	Chananai Sukhawat (Jet'aime)	"เธอจะอยู่กับฉันตลอดไป"	—	—	—N/a	—
Episode 7 (Monday, January 7)	4	Kong Saharat	"อยากจะลืม"	Thanaphat Peanchompoo (Foofoo)	Karun Satchadewa (Run)	"นักโทษประหาร"	—N/a	—	—	—
Episode 7 (Monday, January 7)	5	Joey Boy	"Goodbye My Love"	Natnatcha Namchareonsombut (Ann)	Engfa Waraha	"พี่ไปดู หนูไปด้วย"	—	—	—N/a	—
Episode 7 (Monday, January 7)	6	Jennifer Kim	"หมากัด"	Thatsanai Kittirungsuwan (Tao)	Hathaikarn Klahan (Pudthai)	"คิดถึงทุ่งลุยลาย"	—	—N/a		—
Episode 8 (Monday, January 14)	1	Pop Pongkool	"04:00"	Sayapha Singchu (Tangmo)	Phatiya Tuadsuwan (Mark)	"ห้องสุดท้าย"	—	—	—	—N/a
Episode 8 (Monday, January 14)	2	Jennifer Kim	"อยากให้รู้ว่าเหงา"	Thitiyakorn Thongsri (Pim)	Kewalin Wongjai (Mew)	"มหันตภัย"	—	—N/a	—	
Episode 8 (Monday, January 14)	3	Kong Saharat	"Versace on the Floor"	Piangpen Bunkaeo (Taew)	Archanai Thamniyai (Joe)	"Wanted"	—N/a	—	—	—
Episode 8 (Monday, January 14)	4	Pop Pongkool	"Lady"	Jakkrit Khamjit (Joey Phuwasit)	Jittanit Panitwit (Numchum)	"อยากนอนกับเธอ"	—	—	—	—N/a
Episode 8 (Monday, January 14)	5	Kong Saharat	"น้อยไปอีกหรือ"	Anil Suwannachot	Yanin Chotisut (Tu)	"กลกามแห่งความรัก"	—N/a	—	—	—
Episode 8 (Monday, January 14)	6	Joey Boy	"Creep"	Worraruethai Phakdiwijit (Nueng)	Tipphayaphon Wiyasing (Puifai)	"ช่างไม่รู้เลย"	—		—N/a	
Episode 9 (Monday, January 21)	1	Kong Saharat	"สัญญากับใจ"	Onratda Rojjanatechasiri (Nissnueng)	Pimnipha & Narissara (Namoon & May)	"ช่วงนี้"	—N/a	—	—	Team full
Episode 9 (Monday, January 21)	2	Jennifer Kim	"รังเกียจกันไหม"	Ekkarat Phonsri (Ou)	Praiwan Srikam (Se)	"เลิกรา"	—	—N/a	—	Team full
Episode 9 (Monday, January 21)	3	Joey Boy	"นาฬิกาตาย"	Monsit Suansri (Ped)	Natwadee Khambenja (Tatcher)	"ละครชีวิต"	—	—	—N/a	Team full
Episode 9 (Monday, January 21)	4	Pop Pongkool	"แม่เกี่ยว"	Nathee Sinchanya (Earth)	Wathanyoo Pringhatyai (Pok)	"ปรากฏการณ์"	—		—	Team full
Episode 9 (Monday, January 21)	5	Pop Pongkool	"IDGAF"	Khrongkwan Wankhanongkit (Ink)	Alisa Nutiam (Tess)	"Can't Feel My Face"	—	—	—	Team full
Episode 9 (Monday, January 21)	6	Joey Boy	"เปลืองน้ำตา"	Pongsatorn Kambang (Lek)	Aree Rueangsawat (Boss)	"รักครั้งแรก"		—	—N/a	Team full
Episode 10 (Monday, January 28)	1	Kong Saharat	"เหงา"	Apisit Suriwong (Sefe)	Pradutphon Khamklom (Zai)	"คงไม่ทัน"	—N/a	—	—	Team full
Episode 10 (Monday, January 28)	2	Jennifer Kim	"ผิดตรงไหน"	Jetsada Trirungkit (Aun)	Chonlatorn Wajisattayanurak (Cherry)	"นอนไม่หลับ"		—N/a	—	Team full
Episode 10 (Monday, January 28)	3	Pop Pongkool	"ลบ"	Nutprawe Khongrod (Mew)	Phonsawan Yanwaro (Bungkee)	"อยู่ดีๆก็..."	Team full	—	—	Team full
Episode 10 (Monday, January 28)	4	Jennifer Kim	"แมงมุม"	Matwakarn Thongkham (Ammy)	Wanchaleom Luangprathum (Aemy)	"นานเท่าไหร่ก็รอ"	Team full	—N/a		Team full
Episode 10 (Monday, January 28)	5	Kong Saharat	"ท่าฉลอม"	Alongkorn Sirimahaweero (Plug)	Ittiphon Photichai (M)	"อกหักเพราะรักแป๋ว"	Team full		Team full	Team full
Episode 10 (Monday, January 28)	6	Joey Boy	"โสดกะปริบกะปรอย"	Buma & Suphamet (Danny & Pipe)	Apinya Lohirun (Ice)	"You Let Me Down"	Team full	Team full	Team full	Team full

== The Battles ==
– Artist won the Battles and advanced to the Live Playoffs
– Artist lost the Battles and was eliminated

Episode	Order	Coach	Winner	Song	Loser
Episode 11 (Monday, February 4)	1	Kong Saharat	Apisit Suriwong (Sefe)	"รูปไม่หล่อมีสิทธิ์ไหมครับ"	Thanaphat Peanchompoo (Fooofoo)
Episode 11 (Monday, February 4)	2	Pop Pongkool	Areeya Rotjanadit (Lookpla)	"กุหลาบแดง"	Kewalin Wongjai (Mew)
Episode 11 (Monday, February 4)	3	Jennifer Kim	Ekkarat Phonsri (Ou)	"กํานันทองหล่อ"	Ittiphon Photichai (M)
Episode 11 (Monday, February 4)	4	Joey Boy	Worraruethai Phakdiwijit (Nueng)	"Lovefool"	Benyada Thawornset (Ben)
Episode 11 (Monday, February 4)	5	Kong Saharat	Aree Rueangsawat (Boss)	"I Just Can't Stop Loving You"	Piangpen Bunkaeo (Taew)
Episode 11 (Monday, February 4)	6	Pop Pongkool	Sayapha Singchu (Tangmo)	"เต่างอย"	Tipphayaphon Wiyasing (Puifai)
Episode 11 (Monday, February 4)	7	Joey Boy	Pongsatorn Kambang (Lek)	"เป็นอย่างนี้ตั้งแต่เกิดเลย"	Monsit Suansri (Ped)
Episode 11 (Monday, February 4)	8	Jennifer Kim	Thatsanai Kittirungsuwan (Tao)	"ผีเสื้อราตรี"	Matwakarn Thongkham (Amy)
Episode 12 (Monday, February 11)	1	Jennifer Kim	Thitiyakorn Thongsri (Pim)	"แอบเจ็บ"	Saharat O'Leary (Kevin)
Episode 12 (Monday, February 11)	2	Kong Saharat	Onratda Rojjanatechasiri (Nissnueng)	"ทําเป็นไม่ทัก"	Chonlatorn Wajisattayanurak (Cherry)
Episode 12 (Monday, February 11)	3	Pop Pongkool	Khrongkwan Wankhanongkit (Ink)	"Fix You"	—N/a (Note: Pop Pongkool chose both of them to advance as a duo.)
Episode 12 (Monday, February 11)	3	Pop Pongkool	Nutprawe Khongrod (Mew)	"Fix You"	—N/a
Episode 12 (Monday, February 11)	4	Joey Boy	Buma & Suphamet (Danny & Pipe)	"คนใจง่าย"	Hathaikarn Klahan (Pudthai)
Episode 12 (Monday, February 11)	5	Jennifer Kim	Wathanyoo Pringhatyai (Pok)	"เหตุผล"	Jetsada Trirungkit (Aun)
Episode 12 (Monday, February 11)	6	Joey Boy	Wanchaleom Luangprathum (Aemy)	"เปลี่ยนกันไหม"	Natnatcha Namchareonsombut (Ann)
Episode 12 (Monday, February 11)	7	Kong Saharat	Alongkorn Sirimahaweero (Plug)	"กลับมาทำไม" & "มาทำไม"	Anil Suwannachot
Episode 12 (Monday, February 11)	8	Pop Pongkool	Jakkrit Khamjit (Joey Phuwasit)	"คิดฮอด"	Nathee Sinchanya (Earth)

== Live shows ==
=== Episode 13 & 14 : The Playoffs (February 18 & 25) ===
Artist advanced to the Final by the Public's votes
Artist was eliminated

Episode	Order	Code	Coach	Artist	Song	Score	Result
Episode 13 (Monday, February 18)	1	TV1	Joey Boy	Pongsatorn Kambang (Lek)	"บาดเจ็บ"	62%	Advanced
Episode 13 (Monday, February 18)	1	TV2	Jennifer Kim	Thatsanai Kittirungsuwan (Tao)	"ระเบิดเวลา"	38%	Eliminated
Episode 13 (Monday, February 18)	2	TV3	Jennifer Kim	Wathanyoo Pringhatyai (Pok)	"คนไม่เอาถ่าน"	54%	Advanced
Episode 13 (Monday, February 18)	2	TV4	Kong Saharat	Alongkorn Sirimahaweero (Plug)	"ชัยชนะ"	46%	Eliminated
Episode 13 (Monday, February 18)	3	TV5	Kong Saharat	Onratda Rojjanatechasiri (Missnueng)	"รักเธอนิรันดร์"	61%	Advanced
Episode 13 (Monday, February 18)	3	TV6	Pop Pongkool	Nutprawe & Khrongkwan (Mew & Ink)	"Ddu-Du Ddu-Du"	39%	Eliminated
Episode 13 (Monday, February 18)	4	TV7	Pop Pongkool	Jakkrit Khamjit (Joey Phuwasit)	"ข้ามันลูกทุ่ง"	70%	Advanced
Episode 13 (Monday, February 18)	4	TV8	Joey Boy	Buma & Suphamet (Danny & Pipe)	"บักแตงโม"	30%	Eliminated
Episode 14 (Monday, February 25)	1	TV1	Joey Boy	Wanchaleom Luangprathum (Aemmy)	"ผิดที่ไว้ใจ"	59%	Advanced
Episode 14 (Monday, February 25)	1	TV2	Kong Saharat	Aree Rueangsawat (Boss)	"หลับตา"	41%	Eliminated
Episode 14 (Monday, February 25)	2	TV3	Kong Saharat	Apisit Suriwong (Sefe)	"ถามยาย"	51%	Advanced
Episode 14 (Monday, February 25)	2	TV4	Jennifer Kim	Ekkarat Phonsri (Ou)	"Miss Call"	49%	Eliminated
Episode 14 (Monday, February 25)	3	TV5	Jennifer Kim	Thitiyakorn Thongsri (Pim)	"ทรมาน"	19%	Eliminated
Episode 14 (Monday, February 25)	3	TV6	Pop Pongkool	Areeya Rotjanadit (Lookpla)	"งานเต้นรำในคืนพระจันทร์เต็มดวง"	81%	Advanced
Episode 14 (Monday, February 25)	4	TV7	Pop Pongkool	Sayapha Singchu (Tangmo)	"ซ่อนกลิ่น"	83%	Advanced
Episode 14 (Monday, February 25)	4	TV8	Joey Boy	Worraruethai Phakdiwijit (Nueng)	"ควายเท่านั้น"	17%	Eliminated

=== Episode 15 : Final (March 4) ===
Order	Coach	Artist	Song	Percentage	Result
Round 1 Group 1
TV1	Kong Saharat	Apisit Suriwong (Sefe)	"กัญชา"	7%	Eliminated
TV2	Jennifer Kim	Wathanyoo Pringhatyai (Pok)	"เดียวดายกลางสายลม"	17%	Eliminated
TV3	Kong Saharat	Onratda Rojjanatechasiri (Nissnueng)	"เชพบ๊ะ"	39%	Advanced
TV4	Pop Pongkool	Sayapha Singchu (Tangmo)	"มือถือไมค์ไฟส่องหน้า"	37%	Eliminated
Round 1 Group 2
TV5	Pop Pongkool	Areeya Rotjanadit (Lookpla)	"ชีวิตฉันขาดเธอไม่ได้"	3%	Eliminated
TV6	Joey Boy	Wanchaleom Luangprathum (Aemy)	"เพลงสุดท้าย"	4%	Eliminated
TV7	Pop Pongkool	Jakkrit Khamjit (Joey Phuwasit)	"ความเชื่อ"	41%	Eliminated
TV8	Joey Boy	Pongsatorn Kambang (Lek)	"รักเธอทั้งหมดของหัวใจ"	52%	Advanced
Round 2
TV3	Kong Saharat	Onratda Rojjanatechasiri (Nissnueng)	"สัญญากับใจ"	14%	Runner-up
TV8	Joey Boy	Pongsatorn Kambang (Lek)	"อกหักเพราะรักเมีย"	86%	Winner
