= Kanteera Wadcharathadsanakul =

Thai singer and actress

- กานต์ธีรา วัชรทัศนกุล
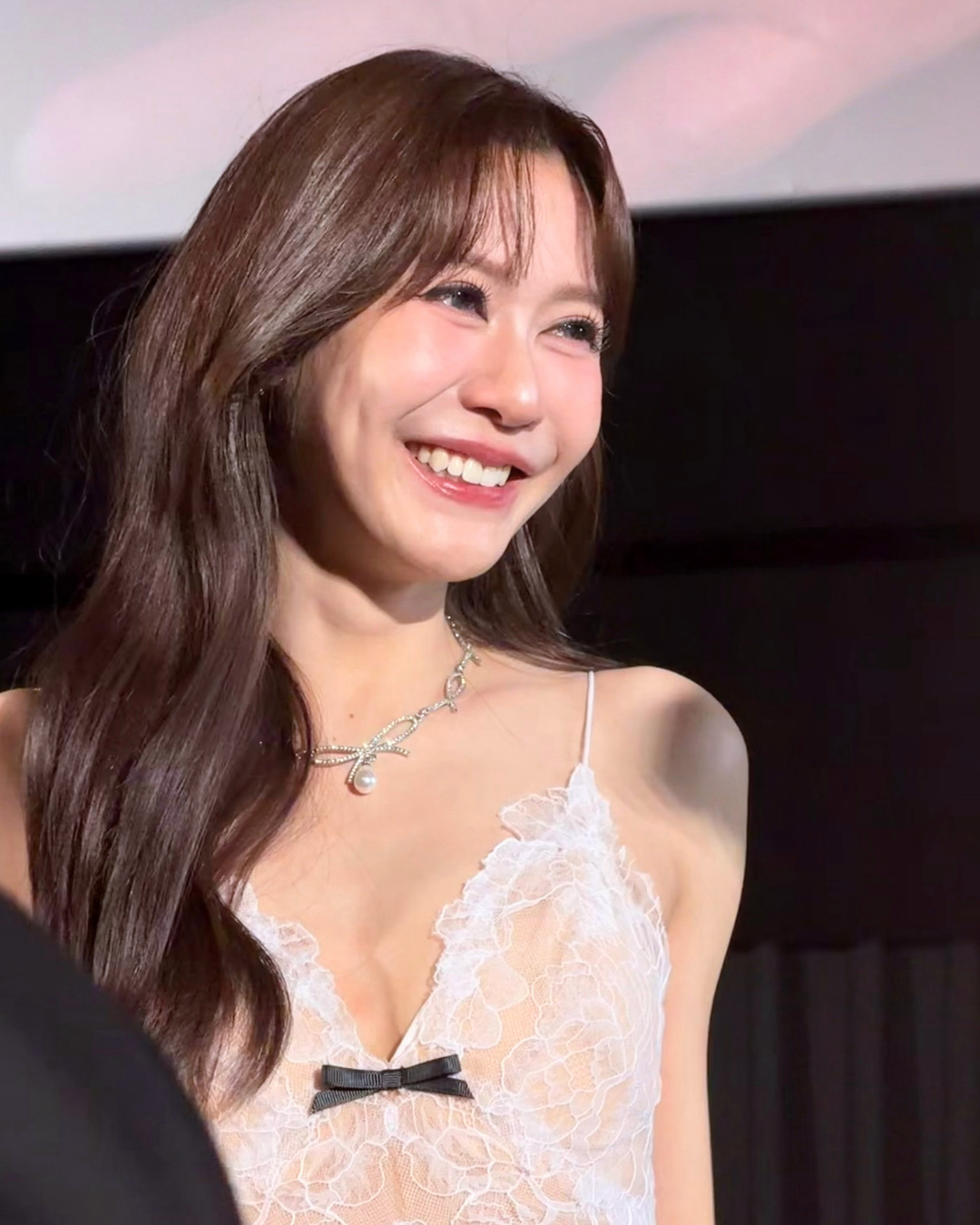
- Noey in 2026
- Born: April 9, 1997 (age 29); Samut Prakan, Thailand
- Other name: Noey
- Occupations: Singer; Actress
- Years active: 2017–present
- Musical career
- Genres: T-Pop; J-Pop
- Formerly of: BNK48 (2017–2022); LYRA (2020–2021)

Kanteera Wadcharathadsanakul (Thai: กานต์ธีรา วัชรทัศนกุล; born April 9, 1997), also known as Noey (Thai: เนย), is a Thai singer and actress. She is a former first-generation member of the Thai girl group BNK48, where she was a member of Team BIII. She was also a member of the group's sub-unit LYRA (later renamed VYRA). Following her graduation from BNK48 in December 2022, she has worked as an independent artist, with her works including her theatrical debut in the stage play Onlaman Lang Ban Sai Thong (2023) and a starring lead role in the 2026 television series 4 Elements: The Fire.

== Early life ==
Kanteera Wadcharathadsanakul was born in Samut Prakan, Thailand.

== Career ==
=== 2017–2022: BNK48 ===
Kanteera joined BNK48 as a first-generation trainee on February 12, 2017. During her early years with the group, she was frequently noted for her shy and reserved personality. She was promoted to Team BIII on December 24, 2017, during the team's initial formation. During her tenure with the group, she served as a center for two singles. She held the double center position for the Thai version of "Shonichi" (2018) alongside Praewa Suthamphong (Miusic), and later served as the center for "Kimi wa Melody" (2018).

In addition to her activities with the main group, she was selected as a member of the sub-unit LYRA (later renamed VYRA) in 2020, a collaboration between Universal Music Thailand and iAM Records. However, in February 2021, Kanteera announced her departure from the sub-unit to focus on her primary commitments with BNK48, as she faced difficulties balancing the workloads of both groups.

On October 30, 2022, she announced her graduation from BNK48 during the BNK48 & CGM48 Request Hour 2022. On December 18, 2022, she participated in the BNK48 1st Generation Graduation Concert "Dan D'1ion" held at BITEC Bang Na. Her activities with the group officially concluded on December 21, 2022, following the BNK48 1st Generation Special Stage.

Apart from her musical activities, Kanteera expanded her career into acting. In 2019, she starred in the musical-comedy crossover film Thibaan x BNK48, playing a fictionalized version of herself as part of the main cast.

In November 2022, shortly before her graduation from BNK48, she took on a lead role in the anthology film The Cheese Sisters. She portrayed the character Fern in the segment titled "Dairy Farm", starring alongside Milin Watinthanakit.

==== BNK48 Senbatsu General Elections ====
Kanteera participated in all three BNK48 Senbatsu General Elections during her time with the group. She consistently ranked within the top seven members, commonly referred to as the "Kami 7."

In the first election in 2019, she placed 7th with 44,769 votes. In the second election in 2020, she improved her position to 6th place, receiving 38,100 votes. In her final election in 2022, she achieved her highest rank, finishing in 3rd place with a total of 115,306.45 votes (recorded in BNK Governance Tokens).

===== Election results =====
Year	Election	Rank	Votes	Single
2019	1st Senbatsu General Election	7th	44,769	6th Single: "Beginner"
2020	2nd Senbatsu General Election	6th	38,100	9th Single: "Heavy Rotation"
2022	3rd Senbatsu General Election	3rd	115,306.45	12th Single: "Believers"

=== 2023–present: Independent career ===
Following her graduation from BNK48 in December 2022, Kanteera began her transition into a full-time entertainer and actress. She was initially managed by UNEQ Entertainment before transitioning into an independent artist.

Between June and July 2023, Kanteera made her theatrical debut in the stage play Onlaman Lang Ban Sai Thong (อลหม่านหลังบ้านทรายทอง). Produced by Dreambox, the play was a comedic adaptation of the classic Thai novel Ban Sai Thong and ran for a total of eight performances at M Theatre. She portrayed the character of a clumsy intern, a comedic role performed alongside veteran actors. This production marked her theatrical debut and served as her initial foray into live theatre following her graduation from BNK48.

In 2025, Kanteera expanded her acting portfolio with a supporting role in the television series Reverse with Me, broadcast on Channel 3HD. Later that year, she was officially announced as one of the eight lead actresses in the high-profile television franchise 4 Elements, specifically headlining the series 4 Elements: The Fire, produced by North Star Entertainment.

=== Discography ===
BNK48 singles

Year	No.	Title	Role	Notes
2017	1	"Aitakatta"	A-side	Also sang "Oogoe Diamond" and "365nichi no Kamihikouki"
2017	2	"Koi Suru Fortune Cookie"	A-side	Also sang "BNK48"
2018	3	"Shonichi"	A-side	Double center position alongside Praewa Suthamphong. Also sang "Sakura no Hanabiratachi" and "Namida Surprise!"
2018	4	"Kimi wa Melody"	A-side	Center position
2018	5	"BNK Festival"	A-side	
2019	6	"Beginner"	A-side	Ranked 7th in General Election 2019 (Kami 7 position)
2019	7	"77 no Suteki na Machi e"	A-side	
2020	8	"High Tension"	A-side	Also sang "Dode Di Dong"
2020	9	"Heavy Rotation"	A-side	Ranked 6th in General Election 2020 (Kami 7 position)
2021	10	"D.AAA"	A-side	Also sang "Sukida Sukida Sukida"
2022	11	"Sayonara Crawl"	A-side	
2022	12	"Believers"	A-side	Ranked 3rd in General Election 2022 (Kami 7 position)
2022	Special	"Jiwaru DAYS"	A-side	Also sang "Pioneer" and "Sakura no Ki ni Narou"

BNK48 Albums

Year	No.	Title	Participated song
2018	1	RIVER	"RIVER"
2020	2	Jabaja	"Jabaja" and "Bye Bye Plastic"
2020	3	Warota People	"Can You...?"

=== Films ===
Year	Title	Role	Notes	Ref(s)
2018	BNK48: Girls Don't Cry	Herself	Documentary film	
2020	Thibaan X BNK48	Herself	Full-length film	
2020	BNK48: One Take	Herself	Documentary film	
2022	The Cheese Sisters	Fern	Main role (Segment: "Dairy Farm")	
2025	ROOMMATE	Herself	Short-film	

=== Series ===
Year	Title	Role	Network	Notes	Ref(s)
2025	Reverse with Me	Nene	Channel 3HD	Support Role	
2026	4 Elements: The Fire	Kaphrao (Athittaya)	Ch7HD	Lead role	

=== Theatre ===
Year	Title	Role	Venue	Notes	Ref(s)
2023	Onlaman Lang Ban Sai Thong (อลหม่านหลังบ้านทรายทอง)	Ploy	M Theatre	Total of 8 performances	

=== Music Videos ===
Year	Title	Artist	Ref(s)
2019	"เสียงขอร้องของคนเสียใจ"	Dome Pakorn Lam	
2023	"ช่วงเวลาต้องมนตร์"	With Orn, Tarwaan, Korn and Tomo	
2024	"Baby Baby Boo"	With Pitcha, Tarwaan, Jennis and Kaew	
2025	"Forget Forgot Forgotten"	MYYU	
2026	"กลับมาพบกัน (Back Again)"	With Namneung	
2026	"เก็บไว้ไม่ให้ใครรู้ (Secret Love)"		
