= Jessica Sompong Espiner =

Thai actress (born 1997)

Jessica Espiner
- Born: Jessica Espiner (เจสสิก้า เอสพินเนอร์); February 22, 1997 (age 29); Bangkok, Thailand
- Education: Rangsit University
- Occupations: Actress; Model
- Years active: 2016–present

Jessica Sonpong Espiner (Thai: เจสสิก้า สมปอง เอสพินเนอร์; born 22 February 1997), nicknamed Jess (Thai: เจส), is a Thai actress on CH7HD who was Miss Grand Bangkok 2017.

== Career ==
=== Pageantry ===
Jessica won Miss Grand Bangkok 2017 and represent Bangkok at Miss Grand Thailand, She was place at top 12 Miss Grand Thailand 2019 and won Miss Grand Rising Star contract an actress at CH7HD

== Filmography ==
=== Television ===
- 2017, Passion DIARY, as Feara
- 2018, LOVE COMPLEX, as Je
- 2018, Kluen Pee Puan, as LookPaer
- 2018, MaeSueParkRai PooChaiRosJad, as Panita / Nita
- 2020, Roi-Pa, as SaengThong
- 2022, My Lovely Bodyguard, as Prima

=== Movie ===
- 2561 KhunBunLue, as Tharin

== Hosting ==
- Tieng Bunterng
