= She Is Still Cute Today =

Manhua by Guo Si Te

- Volume 1 cover

今天的她也是如此可爱
- Genre: Comedy, Romance, Girls' love
- Author: Guo Si Te
- Other publishers: Tokyopop (US)
- Original run: September 14 2019 – present
- Volumes: 3

She Is Still Cute Today (Chinese: 今天的她也是如此可爱), also known as My Darling is the Cutest, is a Chinese girls' love manhua written and illustrated by Guo Si Te. The manhua has been serialized online via Kuaikan Comics from September 14, 2019, and was later published into three paperback collections by Yangcheng Wanban Publishing House. The story follows the highest scoring academic student, Sadie Cang, and the lowest scoring student, Lex Qi, as they are brought together to dispel gossip surrounding Sadie's love life.

== Plot ==
Sadie Cang, the top student in Class 1, is troubled by gossip that she is in a relationship with the school heartthrob Cui Xin, Unable to take rumors any longer, Sadie lies and claims she is interested in Lex Qi, the worst student in Class 7. While just meant as a casual excuse, she doesn't realize that Lex Qi was sitting behind her and heard everything. The two girls, initially strangers, become best friends due to the misunderstanding, experiencing the chaotic daily life on campus together.

== Media ==
=== Manhua ===
Written and illustrated by Guo Si Te, She Is Still Cute Today began serialization online via Kuaikan Comics on September 14, 2019. After the first season concluded the series went onto hiatus. The series has been collected into three print volumes by Yangcheng Wanban Publishing House as of October 1, 2023. In 2021 it was licensed by Tapas for a digital English release under the titles "My Darling is the Cutest", and in 2025 Tokyopop announced it would be publishing English print volumes in North America.

No.	Original release date	Original ISBN	English release date	English ISBN
1	July 1, 2021	978-7554309285	July 28, 2026	978-1427884763
2	June 1, 2022	978-7554310168	—	—
3	October 1, 2023	978-7554312438	—	—

=== Drama ===
A live-action television drama adaptation starring Sun Mei Lin and Zhu Lin Yu was announced on July 3, 2022. The show was produced by Motie Entertainment, Yiping Xiangshang, and Feiyu Xingji, and was released on the streaming platform Tencent Video on July 11, 2026.
