= The Air =

2026 Thai television series

- Official series poster
- Thai: เสน่หาวาโย
- Genre: Girls' love; Romance drama; Action
- Based on: The Air by Salmon (แซลม่อน)
- Written by: Tinna Simapaisal
- Directed by: Kittisak Cheewasatjasakun
- Starring: Sarocha Chankimha; Rebecca Patricia Armstrong
- Country of origin: Thailand
- Original language: Thai
- No. of episodes: 8

Production
- Executive producer: Kanyarat Jiraratchakit
- Running time: 61–94 minutes
- Production company: North Star Entertainment

Original release
- Network: Channel 7HD; iQIYI
- Release: 16 May – 4 July 2026

The Air (Thai: เสน่หาวาโย; RTGS: Saneha Wayo, lit. 'Love Wind') is a Thai romantic drama series, starring Sarocha Chankimha (Freen) and Rebecca Patricia Armstrong. Directed by Kittisak Cheewasatjasakun, produced by North Star Entertainment, the series was adapted from the novel of the same name by Salmon (แซลม่อน). It is the third series in the 4 Elements shared universe.

The series premiered on Channel 7HD on 16 May 2026, airing on Saturdays at 20:30 ICT. The uncut version was made available for streaming at 21:30 ICT on iQIYI.

== Synopsis ==
Princess "Blew" Catherine de Leina de Madelin visits Thailand and is placed under the protection of a police officer Wayo "Lom" Watinwanich.

When an assassination attempt forces them into hiding, the two grow emotionally close, developing forbidden feelings despite knowing a relationship may be impossible.

With enemies closing in, Lom is determined to protect the princess at all costs, leading to a final confrontation.

== Cast and characters ==
=== Main ===
- Sarocha Chankimha (Freen) as Police Lieutenant Vayo Watinwanich (Lom / Wind)
- Rebecca Patricia Armstrong (Becky) as Princess Catherine Blew de Laina de Madeline (Blew / Phatpha) and Helena

=== Supporting ===
- Lapisara Intarasut (Apple) as Kasama Watinwanich (Din)
- Panthita Chencharoentham (Mim) as Tipapha Amornjinda (Rose)
- Engfa Waraha as Apo Wathinwanich (Nam)
- Charlotte Austin as Cholada Kunanon (Lada)
- Milin Watinthanakit (Namneung) as Atchima Watinwanich (Fai)
- Veronica Pagano (Renée) as Grace
- Thitisan Goodburn (Kim) as Henri
- Wanchana Sawasdee as Police General Wathit Watinwanich
- Thanthip Thaweesinthanat (Mew) as Farin Carver (Fah)
- Prompatcha Sanitwong Na Ayutthaya (Frung) as Police Sub-Lieutenant Beam
- Justin Angus Moir as Prince Karel Jean de Laina de Madeline
- Peter Tuinstra as King Arthur de Laina de Madeline
- Ken Streutker as Antoine
- Orntara Poonsak (Nam) as Buakiang, Buahima and Bua
- Vattcharachai Sundarasiri (Ant) as Suea
- Lerwith Sangsith (Aon) as Yod
- Yong Chernyim as Boonsong
- Natchukorn Maikan (Nong) as Santi

=== Guest ===
- Kevlin Kortland as Yosita Wathinwanit
- Ampa Phusit as Phaka
- Thitayaporn Prasertsom as Doctor Mew
- Gwanggi Clung as News Reporter from Ch7HD

== Production ==
On 12 January 2025, The Sapphic Series mega project was announced as a Major GL (Girls' Love) produced by Idol Factory and North Star Entertainment, featuring four distinct novels and series, each themed around a classical element and set in a different region of Thailand. Idol Factory and North Star Entertainment teamed up and produced the mega project 4 Elements. This project features four series: The Earth, The Water, The Air, and The Fire. This 2025 project features four distinct GL series based on the 4 Elements novel universe, the series was set to air with a star-studded cast and be exhibited on CH7HD's TV channel during primetime. Meanwhile, iQIYI release the series globally via its streaming platform.

The Air (เสน่หาวาโย) was the first series in this anthology to began filming on 17 July 2025. This marked the start of filming for all four series. One interesting fact is that the first day of filming also marked Mim Panthita's acting debut, as well as the filming of the first scenes featuring AppleMim (the lead stars of The Earth). Filming of The Air also marked the first ever on-screen collaboration between FreenBecky and Englot, two of the most iconic figures in the GL community in Thailand and around the world. By the end of the year, the main production company, Idol Factory, had left the project due to internal and legal issues. North Star Entertainment then took over leading the project as the main production company with its CEO, Tik Kanyarat, acting as the sole executive producer. After a pause in filming due to legal issues with the former producer, The Air resumed filming on 18 January 2026. It became the last of the four series to finish filming on 22 March 2026, having visited locations across all Thailand (from North to South) and completed 29 queues, the most of any of the 4 Elements series, thereby completing not only its own show, but also the entire anthology filming schedule.

== Episodes Overview ==
| No. | Title | Original release date | TH viewers (millions) |
|---|---|---|---|
| 1 | "Welcome to The Air" | 16 May 2026 | 2.3 |
Lom is assigned to protect Princess Blew of Madelin. However, a treasonous plot leads to the Princess being drugged and abducted for execution. After a daring rescue, Lom discovers a shocking truth: an impostor has taken the Princess’s place! Amidst a deadly conspiracy and a high-stakes chase, can Lom protect the true heir and expose the global deception?
| 2 | "The Air Closer Distance" | 23 May 2026 | 2.4 |
Danger intensifies as "Sua" raids the safehouse to assassinate Princess Blew! Lom ignites a thrilling rescue, escorting the Princess through gunfire to a hideout in the North using a brilliant diversion to lure the villains South. Amidst the chaos, an undeniable spark forms will this mission transform into a forbidden love?
| 3 | "The Air Hidden Heart" | 30 May 2026 | 2.3 |
Watit orders Lom to stand down, but the royal convoy he leads is brutally ambushed, leaving the unit in chaos. Having secretly followed them, Lom rescues Princess Blew just in time. They flee to Hua Hin, hitching rides on vegetable trucks to stay hidden. Amidst the life-and-death stakes, the Princess who once pushed Lom away now confesses she "needs" her... How will this forbidden spark end?
| 4 | "The Air Crossing The Line" | 6 June 2026 | 2.1 |
The line between "Princess" and "Bodyguard" shatters when assassins storm Hua Hin, forcing Lom to smuggle Blew away in a laundry truck to a remote private island. Amidst newfound freedom, Blew dares to cross the boundaries of status to get closer to Lom , leading to a breathtaking kiss that changes everything. But even in paradise, the deadly hunters are closing in.
| 5 | "The Air Drifting Closer" | 13 June 2026 | 2.4 |
Love blossoms on a secret island as Lom and Blew live as "Wind and Pudpa". But paradise shatters when Sua’s gang tracks them down and launches a brutal raid. Lom acts as a decoy to save the Princess, leading to a high-speed sea chase that ends in tragedy. Shot and falling into the deep ocean, Lom disappears beneath the waves, forcing a desperate Blew to dive in after her as the world watches in horror.
| 6 | "The Air Confessed Heart" | 20 June 2026 | 2.4 |
Blew heroically rescues Lom from the ocean depths , but the peace is shattered when Henri infiltrates the hospital to finish the job, forcing a daring escape to the mountains! Amidst the high-stakes hideout, Lom confesses her love to the Princess , unaware that a lethal trap is being set for a final bloody showdown.
| 7 | "The Air Bleeding Love" | 27 June 2026 | 2.1 |
Wathit’s trap turns deadly when Henri outsmarts them and takes Princess Blew hostage! Lom braves a hail of bullets and suffers severe injuries to rescue her , while Grace reveals a blood-stained vendetta and fires at Blew right before Lom’s eyes! Amidst heartbreaking tears and an abrupt farewell, will their love succumb to destiny and the burden of the crown?
| 8 | "The Air Final Episode" | 4 July 2026 | 2.4 |
Determined to confront her feelings one last time, Wayo travels to Madelin in search of Blew. But when they finally reunite, an unbridgeable wall of royal duty and destiny stands between them. As the princess prepares to ascend the throne, she buries her true feelings behind a composed smile, while Wayo is left with no choice but to say goodbye despite the love they still hold for each other. When fate forces them to choose between love and responsibility, will Blew let go of the woman she loves forever, or will she sacrifice everything to follow her heart? Will their love finally find its happy ending... or become nothing more than a beautiful memory?

== Reception ==
“The Air” has become one of the most highly anticipated premieres in Channel 7HD's special programming lineup. In addition to the praise for the production, beautiful visuals and fast-paced narrative, viewers commented on the skill with which Freen executed the action scenes and the charm and multifaceted performance of Becky, who demonstrated depth in both her portrayal of the princess and her other character, Helena. This has generated a continuous flood of praise, reflected not only in social media trends, but also in the ratings for the first episode. With All 4+ and All 15+ ratings of 2.2% and 2.3% respectively, The Air became not only the highest-rated Y series premiere at its time, but also the highest-rated GL series of all time.

Without losing any momentum from its historic premiere, the second episode maintained the overall numbers and broke its own previous record, reaching a new peak of 2.4%. There was a notable increase in rural and regional viewership, especially among the 40+ demographic, which rose to a 3.0 rating. In addition to its success with the public, critics have loved the series, considering it to be a show that has broken through GL/BL barriers and reached a broad audience as a light-hearted, action-packed drama. Even with expectations growing with each episode, the series shows no signs of slowing down, managing to exceed the expectations of both the public and critics alike. Everyone is eagerly awaiting the next episode.

Meanwhile, due to its global release on the iQIYI streaming platform, The Air has become the Thai series with the highest global viewership on its first-day of the year on iQIYI app. This demonstrates the series' global impact and international reach, as well as the power of the 'FreenBecky' fandom. This cements Freen and Becky's status as the 'Queens of Thai GL' and the 'Number One Thai Couple in the World', an title previously awarded to them by data analysis and specialised media.

That fandom power and the great reception by the general public are also reflected in person, with the tickets for the two main focus 'The Air' events (เสน่หาวาโย Episode 4 Premiere Event & เสน่หาวาโย Final Episode Event) selling out in under 30 minutes, generating equivalent to 3 million baht in ticket sales alone for each event, while also raising approximately 1.000.000 Bath for a 30-minute live stream for the Episode 4 Premiere and approximately 2.000.000 Bath for the official live stream for the Final Episode Event. The last event also count with over 2000 fans closing the 5th floor of Siam Paragon for a special gathering post event to also embrace fans that weren't able to secure their ticket for the inside event.

Continuing its momentum,'The Air' defied expectations by maintaining an overall rating of 2+ across all episodes. It not only maintained its consistency, but also went from strength to strength, achieving new highs through special television events and national occurrences. A prime example of this is that, despite the Thailand morning period, episode 5 of 'The Air' actually managed to achieve a new high rating, even though fans, the team and the TV network expecting a normal decline in viewership due to current circumstances. 'The Air' also competed with major sporting events happening parallel to its airing: episodes 4 to 8 coincided with the 2026 FIFA World Cup and the Volleyball Nations League. A particular highlight was episode 6, which was broadcast at the same time as the Thailand v Canada VNL match. Remarkably, not only did the series maintain its numbers, it also achieved a new nationwide high.

'The Air' wrapped up its official run achieveing over a 2.0 rating for every episode, averaging 2.2 for all 4+ and 2.3 for 15+. On the iQIYI app, it ranks in the top 2 and 3 of most watched series on the platform globally, and consistently stays in the top 10 across 39 countries and territories keeping a 9.9 score over 30k reviews.

In the table below, the blue number represents the lowest numbers and the red number represents the highest numbers across rating and social media platform. The grey numbers are equivalent to untracked or minimal participation numbers due to a special situation in Thailand and are marked with an asterisk (*).

| Social Media Impact - International Impact & Scores | | | | | | | | | | | | | | | | | |
| Episode No. | Air date | Timeslot UTC+1:30pm | Trend X (TH) | Trend X (Worldwide) | Trending (Places) | X (Results) | iQIYI (soaring) | iQIYI (high popularity) | iQIYI (popular search) | iQIYI (drama selection) | iQIYI (high score drama) | iQIYI (ratings) | IMDB | TMDB (score) | MyDramaList | TV ADS | Ref. |
|---|---|---|---|---|---|---|---|---|---|---|---|---|---|---|---|---|---|
| 1 | 16 May 2026 | Saturday 08:30 pm | 1 | 4 | 38 | 1.1M | 7 | 8 | 1 | 18 | 6 | 10 | 9.4 | 100 | 9.1 | 11 | |
| 2 | 23 May 2026 | Saturday 08:30 pm | 2 | 3 | 32 | 1M | 1 | 5 | 1 | 6 | 5 | 9.9 | 9.9 | 100 | 9.6 | 13 | |
| 3 | 30 May 2026 | Saturday 08:30 pm | 1 | 5 | 34 | 1M | 1 | 6 | 1 | 6 | 6 | 9.9 | 10 | 100 | 9.5 | 10 | |
| 4 | 6 Jun 2026 | Saturday 08:30 pm | 3 | 3 | 42 | 1.2M | 1 | 6 | 1 | 6 | 6 | 9.9 | 9.9 | 100 | 9.6 | 15 | |
| 5* | 13 Jun 2026 | Saturday 08:30 pm | 3* | 8* | untracked* | untracked* | 2* | 7* | 3* | 7* | 4* | 9.9 | 10 | 100 | 9.3 | 17* | |
| 6 | 20 Jun 2026 | Saturday 08:30 pm | 3 | 3 | 32 | 794.4k | 3 | 5 | 3 | 5 | 4 | 9.9 | 10 | 100 | 9.3 | 8 | |
| 7 | 27 Jun 2026 | Saturday 08:30 pm | 1 | 2 | 37 | 1.1M | 1 | 10 | 3 | 10 | 5 | 9.9 | 10 | 100 | 9.5 | 11 | |
| 8 | 4 Jul 2026 | Saturday 08:30 pm | 1 | 3 | 46 | 1.6M | 2 | 5 | 5 | 7 | 5 | 9.9 | 9.9 | 100 | 9.3 | 14 | |
| Average | | | 1 | 3 | 36 | 1.1M | 1 | 6 | 1 | 6 | 5 | 9.95 | 9.7 | 90 | 8.3 | 13 | |

Note: Episode 1 placed top 2 New Drama globally in iQIYI.

Note1: Episode 5 was broadcast during the Thai national mourning period. Due to the current situation in the country, the production team and television network suspended the episode hashtag trend out of respect for the royal family and the nation. The figures cited in the above table were achieved with minimal social media participation.

[note1 depicted the special situation marked in the tables with an asterisk (*)]

In the table below, the blue number represents the lowest ratings and the red number represents the highest TV and streaming ratings. The grey numbers are equivalent to untracked or minimal participation numbers due to a special situation and are marked with an asterisk (*).

Audience Impact - Thai TV ratings & Top Streamings Views
| Episode No. | Air date | Timeslot UTC+1:30pm | All 15+ | Female 15+ | 40+ | BKK | Urban | Rural | North | Central | South | Northeast | Average All 4+ | CH7 Website | TrueID | BUGABOO.TV | iQIYI GLOBAL TOP 10 | iQIYI REGIONS (TOP10) | Ref. |
|---|---|---|---|---|---|---|---|---|---|---|---|---|---|---|---|---|---|---|---|
| 1 | 16 May 2026 | Saturday 08:30 pm | 2.3 | 2.8 | 2.8 | 1.5 | 1.9 | 2.4 | 2.6 | 1.7 | 2.4 | 2.5 | 2.2 | 21.75k | 26.4k | 1 | 6 | 32 | |
| 2 | 23 May 2026 | Saturday 08:30 pm | 2.4 | 2.8 | 3.0 | 1.7 | 1.5 | 2.6 | 2.2 | 1.7 | 2.4 | 2.7 | 2.2 | 23.9k | 27.5k | 1 | 3 | 39 | |
| 3 | 30 May 2026 | Saturday 08:30 pm | 2.3 | 2.6 | 2.7 | 1.5 | 1.6 | 2.4 | 3.1 | 1.9 | 2.3 | 2.0 | 2.1 | 25.31k | 29.7k | 1 | 2 | 39 | |
| 4 | 6 Jun 2026 | Saturday 08:30 pm | 2.1 | 2.4 | 2.6 | 1.7 | 1.5 | 2.1 | 2.8 | 1.3 | 2.2 | 2.1 | 2.0 | 21.38k | 30.3k | 1 | 3 | 39 | |
| 5* | 13 Jun 2026 | Saturday 08:30 pm | 2.4* | 2.6* | 3.0* | 1.7* | 1.6* | 2.6* | 2.4* | 1.6* | 2.2* | 2.8* | 2.2* | 20.91k* | 28.1k* | 1* | 3 | 39 | |
| 6 | 20 Jun 2026 | Saturday 08:30 pm | 2.4 | 2.8 | 3.0 | 1.3 | 1.5 | 2.6 | 3.0 | 2.3 | 2.6 | 2.2 | 2.3 | 24.36k | untracked** | 1 | 2 | 39 | |
| 7 | 27 Jun 2026 | Saturday 08:30 pm | 2.1 | 2.4 | 2.6 | 1.5 | 1.6 | 2.2 | 2.5 | 2.1 | 3.0 | 1.5 | 2.0 | 25.52k | 26.1k | 1 | 3 | 39 | |
| 8 | 4 Jul 2026 | Saturday 08:30 pm | 2.4 | 2.7 | 2.8 | 1.1 | 2.2 | 2.5 | 3.2 | 2.6 | 1.9 | 2.1 | 2.2 | 27.50k | 18.1k | 1 | 4 | 39 | |
| Average | | | 2.35 ^{1} | 2.6 ^{1} | 2.8 ^{1} | 1.7 ^{1} | 1.6 ^{1} | 2.4 ^{1} | 2.7 ^{1} | 1.9 ^{1} | 2.3 ^{1} | 2.2 ^{1} | 2.2 ^{1} | 23.65 ^{1} | 27.87 ^{1} | 1 ^{1} | 3 ^{1} | 39 ^{1} | |

Note: Episode 3 aired during Thailand long holiday time.

Note1: Episode 4 aired during Special Premiere Event with FreenBecky.

Note2: Episode 5* aired during the Thai national mourning period.

Note3**: The True ID algorithm crashed several days before the episode was due to air, and remained down with technical issues even after it had aired. This made it impossible to track the number of viewers who were connected at the time of broadcast.

^1 Based on the average audience share per episode.

== Original soundtrack ==
| No. | Title | Lyrics | Artist | Length |
|---|---|---|---|---|
| 1. | "All for you" (Thai: หมดชีวิต) | Paween Wongrat | Freen Sarocha | 3:29 |
| 2. | "Only You" (Thai: แค่มีเธอก็พอแล้ว) | Paween Wongrat | Becky Rebecca | 3:40 |
| 3. | "Stay With Me" () | Paween Wongrat | NOONA | 3:22 |
| Total length: | | | | 10:31 |

== Awards and nominations ==
| Year | Award | Category | Nominees | Nominated work | Result | Ref. |
|---|---|---|---|---|---|---|
| 2026 | HUB Awards 2025 | Most Anticipated Premiere | Full Cast | 4 Elements | Won | |
| 2026 | Tpop Stage | Ost of the Week (week 1) | Becky Rebecca | Don't You Love Me (4 Elements) (week 10/2026) | Won | |
| 2026 | Tpop Stage | Ost of the Week (week 2) | Becky Rebecca | Don't You Love Me (4 Elements) (week 11/2026) | Nominated | |
| 2026 | Tpop Stage | Ost of the Week (week 3) | Becky Rebecca | Don't You Love Me (4 Elements) (week 12/2026) | Nominated | |
| 2026 | Tpop Stage | Ost of the Week (week 4) | Becky Rebecca | Don't You Love Me (4 Elements) (week 13/2026) | Nominated | |
| 2026 | Tpop Stage | Ost of the Week (week 1) | Freen Sarocha | All For You (week 21/2026) | Won | |
| 2026 | Tpop Stage | Ost of the Week (week 2) | Freen Sarocha | All For You (week 22/2026) | Nominated | |
| 2026 | Tpop Stage | Ost of the Week (week 3) | Freen Sarocha | All For You (week 23/2026) | Nominated | |
| 2026 | Tpop Stage | Ost of the Week (week 4) | Freen Sarocha | All For You (week 24/2026) | Nominated | |
| 2026 | Tpop Stage | Popular of the Week (week 4) | Freen Sarocha | All For You (week 24/2026) | Won | |
| 2026 | Tpop Stage | Ost of the Week (week 1) | Becky Rebecca | Only You (week 24/2026) | Nominated | |
| 2026 | Tpop Stage | Ost of the Week (week 2) | Becky Rebecca | Only You (week 25/2026) | Won | |
| 2026 | Tpop Stage | Popular of the Week (week 2) | Becky Rebecca | Only You (week 25/2026) | Won | |
| 2026 | Tpop Stage | Ost of the Week (week 3) | Becky Rebecca | Only You (week 26/2026) | Nominated | |
| 2026 | Tpop Stage | Ost of the Week (week 4) | Becky Rebecca | Only You (week 27/2026) | Nominated | |
| 2026 | Feed X Khaosod Awards 2026 | Nominees for Boys’ Love - Girls’ Love Series Director of the Year | Kittisak Cheewasatjasakun | 4 Elements | Nominated | |
| 2026 | Feed X Khaosod Awards 2026 | Popular Female Actress Award | Becky Rebecca | | Nominated | |
| 2026 | Feed X Khaosod Awards 2026 | Popular Drama Awards | | | Nominated | |
| 2026 | Maya TV Awards 2026 | Charming Woman of The Year | Freen Sarocha | | Nominated | |
| 2026 | Maya TV Awards 2026 | Charming Woman of The Year | Becky Rebecca | | Nominated | |
| 2026 | Maya TV Awards 2026 | Female Couple of The Year | Freen Sarocha and Becky Rebecca | | Won | |
| 2026 | Maya TV Awards 2026 | Popular Vote | Freen Sarocha | | Nominated | |
| 2026 | Maya TV Awards 2026 | Popular Vote | Becky Rebecca | | Nominated | |
| 2026 | BreakTudo Awards 2026 | GL Series of the Year | The Air | | Pending | |
| 2026 | BreakTudo Awards 2026 | International Crush | Freen Sarocha | | Pending | |
| 2026 | BreakTudo Awards 2026 | International TV Star | Becky Rebecca | | Pending | |
| 2026 | The Viral Hits Awards | People’s Choice - Leading Actress of the Year | Freen Sarocha | | Pending | |
| 2026 | The Viral Hits Awards | People’s Choice - Leading Actress of the Year | Becky Rebecca | | Pending | |
| 2026 | The Viral Hits Awards | People’s Choice - Supporting Actress of the Year | Orntara Poolsak | | Pending | |

== Listicles ==
| Year | Publisher | Listicle | Character/Artist | Nominated work | Placement | Ref. |
|---|---|---|---|---|---|---|
| 2026 | Lesbocine | Top Sapphic Characters 2026 | Lom | The Air | 2nd place | |
| 2026 | Lesbocine | Top Sapphic Characters 2026 | Blew | The Air | 3rd place | |

== Events ==
| Year | Day/month | Name | City | Country | Location | Ref. |
|---|---|---|---|---|---|---|
| 2025 | 25 April | 4 Elements: The Global Phenomenon of Girl Love | Bangkok | Thailand | River Park at Iconsiam | |
| 2025 | 04 July | Opening Ceremony 4 Elements บ้านวาทินวณิช | Bangkok | Thailand | Chulalongkorn University Centenary Park | |
| 2026 | 11 January | 4 Elements: The Grand Unveiling | Bangkok | Thailand | Union Hall, Union Mall | |
| 2026 | 06 June | เสน่หาวาโย Episode 4 Premiere Event | Bangkok | Thailand | Siam Pavalai, Siam Paragon | |
| 2026 | 04 July | เสน่หาวาโย Final Episode Event | Bangkok | Thailand | Siam Pavalai, Siam Paragon | |
| 2026 | 12 Sept | 4 Elements:Infinite Bonds Fanmeeting | Bangkok | Thailand | Union Hall, Union Mall | |

Note1: During 4 Elements: The Grand Unveiling Becky Armstrong wasn't present due to overseas work.
