= 4 Elements: The Water =

2026 Thai television series

- Official series poster
- Thai: นทีร้อยเล่ห์
- Genre: Girls' love; Romantic comedy
- Based on: The Water by Salmon
- Directed by: Kittisak Cheewasatjasakun
- Starring: Engfa Waraha; Charlotte Austin
- Country of origin: Thailand
- Original language: Thai
- No. of episodes: 8

Production
- Production company: North Star Entertainment

Original release
- Network: Channel 7
- Release: 21 March – 9 May 2026

4 Elements: The Water (Thai: นทีร้อยเล่ห์; also known as: The Water) is a 2026 Thai girls' love television series, starring Engfa Waraha and Charlotte Austin. It is part of the 4 Elements mega project by North Star Entertainment, about interconnected stories featuring three other prominent GL pairings in their own series, namely 4 Elements: The Earth, 4 Elements: The Air, and 4 Elements: The Fire. Directed by Kittisak Cheewasatjasakun (Fuse), it is adapted from the novel The Water from The Wathinwanits series by Salmon. The series premiered on Channel 7 on 21 March 2026, and was made available for streaming on iQIYI an hour after the initial broadcast.

The series is one of several collaborative GL projects between Engfa Waraha and Charlotte Austin, and features other past Thai national beauty pageant winners such as Suchita Oxman, Michelle Behrmann, and Chutima Sodapak (Miss Grand Thailand 2025 5th runner ups), and Panichada Kongsawanya (Miss Grand Thailand 2025 3rd runner up).

== Synopsis ==
"Amidst a power struggle between "Watin Group" and "Watchara Group," Chonlada, the secret daughter of tycoon Pheemdet, is deployed as a pawn to sabotage their rival. She infiltrates the company as a receptionist to get close to Apo, a sophisticated and sharp executive. Although Apo sees through the ruse from the start, she chooses to play along to protect Lada from lurking dangers.Through scandals and life-threatening crises, their walls crumble, transforming rivalry into genuine care." — iQIYI

== Cast and characters ==
=== Main ===
- Engfa Waraha as Apo "Nam" Wathinwanit
  Executive Vice President of the fictional Monarch Global International Hotel owned by the Wathinwanit family.
- Charlotte Austin as Chonlada "Lada" Kunanon
  The illegitimate daughter of Pheemdech, the Wathinwanit family's business rival.

=== Supporting ===
- Thanthip Thaweesinthanat (Mew) as Farin "Fah" Carver
  A journalist and Nam's younger half-sister from her mother's second marriage.
- Panichada Kongsawanya (Xobam) as Preem
  Nam's secretary.
- Suchita Oxman (Meena) as Net
  Lada's best friend.
- Asavarid Pinitkanjanapun (Heng) as Phat
  Lada's older brother who sends Lada to be a mole at the Wathinwanit family's hotel.
- Michelle Behrmann as Wadee
  A senior receptionist at the Monarch Global International Hotel.
- Chutima Sodapak (Arm) as Nus
  A senior receptionist at the Monarch Global International Hotel.
- Lapisara Intarasut (Apple) as Kasama "Din" Wathinwanit
  Nam's older cousin and the lead of the 4 Elements: The Earth series.
- Sarocha Chankimha (Freen) as Vayo "Lom" Wathinwanit
  Nam's younger cousin and the lead of the 4 Elements: The Air series.
- Panthita Jencharoentham (Mim) as Thipapha "Rose" Amornjida
  Din's wife and the secondary lead of the 4 Elements: The Earth series.
- Milin Watinthanakit (Namneung) as Atchima "Fai" Wathinwanit
  Nam's youngest cousin and the lead of the 4 Elements: The Fire series.
- Pete Thongchua as Adisorn Wathinwanit
  Nam's father and owner of the Wathinwanit family's hotel chain.
- Phol Tantasathien as Pheemdech Watcharadechara
  Chonlada's father and head of the Watchara Group.
- Prachakorn Piyasakulkaew (Sun) as Pheemwat
  Lada's eldest brother.
- Nicole Theriault as Chutimon Kunanon
  Lada's mother and Pheemdech's second wife.

=== Guest ===
- Kochakorn Nimakorn (Ngor) as Pawee Wathinwanit
  Nam and Fah's mother.
- Piya Pongkullapa (Giftza) as May
  Pheemwat's wife and Lada's sister-in-law.

== Original soundtrack ==
Title	English title	Artist	Composer
หรือนี่คือความรัก	Is This Love?	Engfa Waraha	Paween Wongrat
ชคดีที่สุดเลย	Lucky Me	Charlotte Austin	Paween Wongrat
