= Engfa Waraha =

Thai musician, beauty-pageant titleholder, and actress

- อิงฟ้า วราหะ
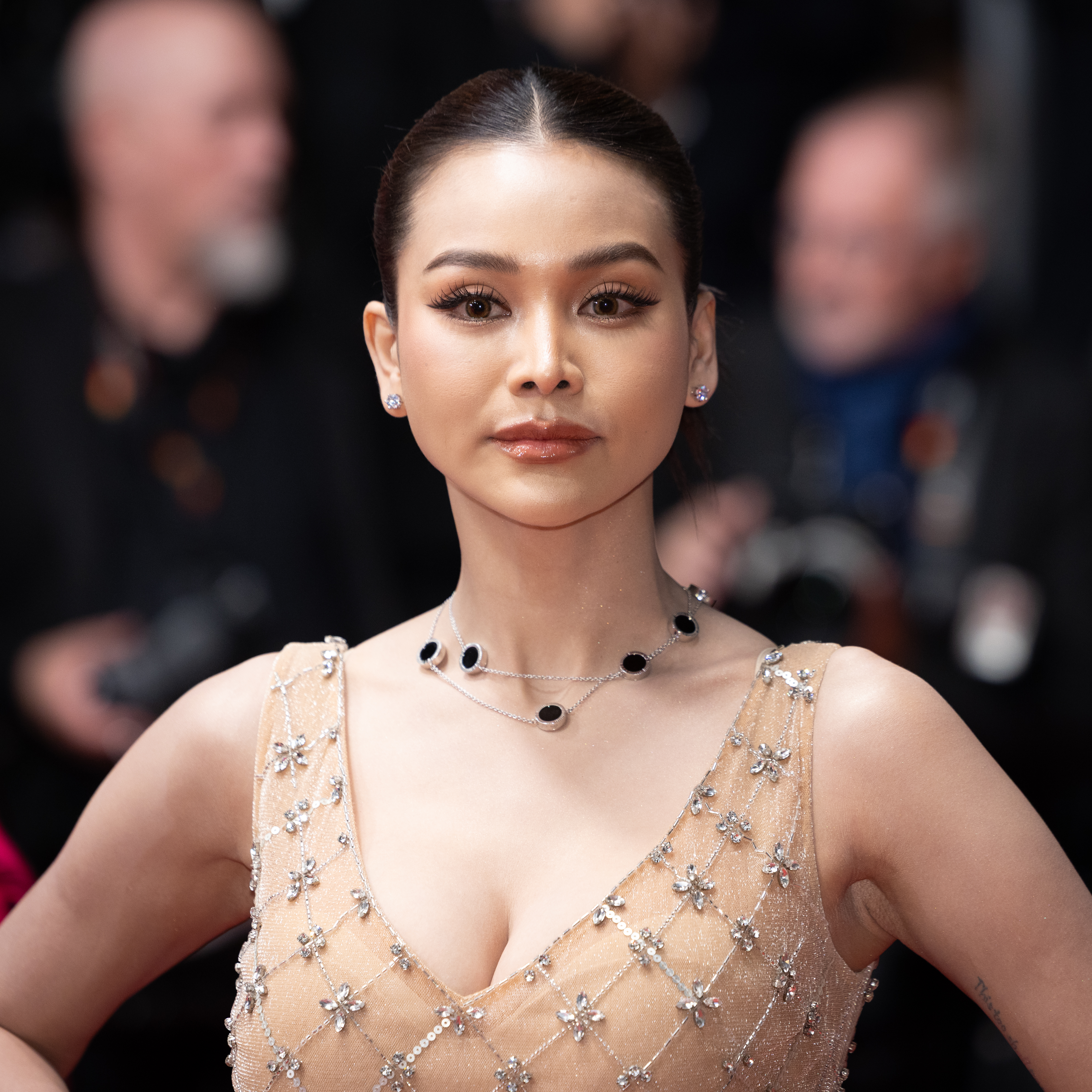
- Waraha in 2025
- Born: 15 February 1995 (age 31); Uthai Thani, Thailand
- Other name: Mook
- Occupations: Singer; model; actress; ceremonial officiant
- Height: 1.70 m (5 ft 7 in)
- Beauty pageant titleholder
- Title: Miss Grand Thailand 2022
- Years active: 2018–present
- Major competitions: Miss Grand Bangkok 2022; (Winner); Miss Grand Thailand 2022; (Winner); Miss Grand International 2022; (1st Runner-Up)

Engfa Waraha (Thai: อิงฟ้า วราหะ, RTGS: Ingfa Waraha, pronounced [ʔīŋ.fáː wá(ʔ).rāː.hàʔ]; born February 15, 1995) is a Thai beauty pageant titleholder and actress. She appeared in the seventh season of The Voice Thailand. In 2022, she won Miss Grand Thailand 2022 representing Bangkok. Later that year, she represented Thailand at Miss Grand International 2022, held in Indonesia on 25 October, where she finished as first runner-up.

She made her acting debut in 2023 in the drama TV series Show Me Love, and in 2024 her film debut in The Paradise of Thorns. It won her the Best Actress of the Year award at the 2025 Thailand Box Office Awards and broke the 150M baht box office record. She was honored at the Red Sea Film Festival Foundation the Women in Cinema Gala held during the 2025 Cannes Film Festival. Her acting roles also sparked discourse around LGBTQ rights in Thailand.

== Early life and career ==
Engfa Waraha was born on 15 February 1995 in Uthai Thani province into a family of musicians; her father was a eyboard player and her mother was a luk thung (Thai pop-country) singer. She has two siblings.

Waraha began performing on stage at the age of six. At the age of 17, she signed a 12-year contract with the Bangkok-based artist management organ Sangravee Entertainment to pay for her father's cancer treatment, and released four singles; two in 2015 and the rest in 2016. In 2013, she met with a master of the Thai blessing ceremony Phonraphee Maneethai (Thai: พรระพี มณีไทย) who later persuaded her to study to be an officiant, and Thai verse singing (Thai: ขับเสภา) until proficient enough to be able to use it for a career. In addition, before entering the national entertainment industry, she also worked as a waitress, greengrocer, food vendor, caddie, and model.

Waraha became known as Engfa Sangravee after participating in the seventh season of the reality singing contest The Voice Thailand in 2018. She was eliminated in the second phase of the contest. Waraha has appeared in several TV and game show programs, including the situation comedy Pen Tor and Raberd Terd Terng, 123 Ranking Show, Still Standing Thailand, and Guess My Age.

== Pageantry ==
In 2020, Waraha entered the provincial pageant, Miss Grand Suphanburi, but withdraw due to contractual problems. She won Miss Grand Bangkok 2022, and Miss Grand Thailand 2022, and was first runner-up at Miss Grand International 2022.

== Recognition ==
=== Women In Cinema Spotlight ===
In May 2025, she was honored at the Cinema Gala, hosted by the Red Sea Film Festival Foundation during the 2025 Cannes Film Festival. Held at the Hôtel du Cap-Eden-Roc in Cap d’Antibes, the gala spotlighted seven women from the Arab world, Africa, and Asia who have made significant contributions to the film and entertainment industries.

Waraha was celebrated for her roles in the 2023 television series Show Me Love, Bangkok Blossom (2024) as Kulap and The Paradise of Thorns (2024). The Paradise of Thorns earned her the Best Actress of the Year award at the 2025 Thailand Box Office Awards, as well as runner-up for Best Actress at the 14th Thai Film Director Awards.

== Filmography ==
=== Film ===
Year	Title	Role	Notes
2024	The Paradise of Thorns	Mo Jongyoi	
2026	ราคี THE STAIN	Malee	
2027	Lady Bee	Khun Boonleung, Lady Bee	

=== Television series ===
Year	Title	Role	Notes
2023	Show Me Love	Meena	
2024	Club Friday Hot Love Issue	Night	Episode: Love Bully
2024	Bangkok Blossom บางกอกคณิกา	Kulap	
2024	Petrichor	Tul Chanwimol	Main Role
2025	The Tipsy Mystery	Ping	
2025	Unlimited Love	Phlu	Main Role
2026	4 Elements: The Earth	Apo “Nam” Wathinwanit	Support Role
2026	4 Elements: The Water	Apo “Nam” Wathinwanit	Main Role
2026	4 Elements: The Air	Apo “Nam” Wathinwanit	Support Role
2026	4 Elements: The Fire	Apo “Nam” Wathinwanit	Support Role
2026	Murder in the Kitchen	Nalin	
2026	Under Her Rules	Rinlada	Guest Role
2027	Love Desire	Irin	

=== Lady Bee at Cannes Film Festival 2025 ===
In May 2025, Waraha was featured at the 2025 Cannes Film Festival, where her upcoming film Lady Bee was officially announced during the Cannes Market. Although Lady Bee was not part of the official screening line up, its unveiling generated significant buzz due to its bold narrative shift and the casting of Engfa Waraha. It directed by Rutaiwan Wongsirasawad and Thanika Jenjesda, the film is a feminist reinterpretation of The Story of Jan Dara, a Thai literary classic by Utsana Phloengtham. Waraha stars as Lady Boonleung, also known as Lady Bee, a character reimagined as the central figure in a narrative exploring identity, desire, and power.

The announcement coincided with Waraha’s recognition at the Women in Cinema Gala, hosted by the Red Sea Film Festival Foundation, which honored seven women from Asia, Africa, and the Arab world for their contributions to cinema. Lady Bee is scheduled to begin principal photography in late 2025, with a global release expected in 2026.

== Awards and nominations ==
Name of the award ceremony, year presented, category, nominee of the award, and the result of the nomination
Year	Award	Category	Nominated work	Result	Ref.
2022	Miss Grand Bangkok	Miss Grand Bangkok	—	Won	
2022	Miss Grand Thailand	Miss Grand Thailand	—	Won	
2022	Miss Grand International	Miss Grand International	—	1st Runner-up	
2022	TikTok Awards Thailand	Best Live Creator Ent. & Music		Won	
2022	TikTok Awards Thailand	Celebrity of the Year		Won	
2022	Kazz Awards	Most Trending on Social Media		Won	
2022	Kazz Awards	Best Girl of the Year		Won	
2022	Kom Chad Luek Awards	Best Female Artist – Cover Folk Music		Won	
2022	TV Pool Stars Party Retire & Reborn	Celebrity of the Year		Won	
2022	TV Pool Stars Party Retire & Reborn	Couple of the Year (Englot)		Won	
2022	The Idol Awards	The Idol Award		Won	
2022	Thairath Best Of The Year	Celebrity of the Year		Won	
2022	Thairath Best Of The Year	Entertainment News of the Year		Won	
2022	Thairath Best Of The Year	Couple of the Year (Englot)		Won	
2022	Sanook Top of the Year	Inspirational Woman of the Year		Won	
2022	Beauty Queen College Awards	Queen of the Year		Won	
2022	Beauty Queen College Awards	Most Fans Favorite		Won	
2023	Maya TV Awards	Charming Woman of the Year		Won	
2023	Kazz Awards	Shining Star of the Year		Won	
2023	Sanook	Most Talked About of the Year		Won	
2023	Miss Grand	Grand Voice Award		Won	
2023	Siamrath Online Awards	Couple of the Year (Englot)		Won	
2024	The National Council on Social Welfare Thailand	Royal Award – Grateful Child Award	—	Won	
2024	EFM Awards	The Rival Couple of the Year (Engfa-Jeff)		Won	
2024	HOWE Awards	Hottest Actress Award		Won	
2024	Thailand Headline Person of the Year Awards	Most Popular Actress in Thailand & China		Won	
2024	Daily News Awards	D-Superstar Award		Won	
2024	Likay Festival Soft Power Awards	Soft Power Award – The Miracle of Life Foundation	—	Won	
2024	Nineentertain Awards	People Choice Award | Mahachon Award		Nominated	
2024	Feed Y Awards	Most Popular Series Actor Award		Nominated	
2024	Sanook Top of the Year 2024	Most Popular Actress of 2024		Won	
2025	Cinefile Audience Awards	Best Leading Actress	The Paradise of Thorns	Won	
2025	Sanook Top of the Year	Actress of the Year		Won	
2025	13th Thailand Social Awards	Best Creator Performance on Social Media – Actor & Actress		Won	
2025	Thailand Box Office Awards	Best Actress of the Year (Movie)	The Paradise of Thorns	Won	
2025	Thailand Box Office Awards	Best Actress of the Year (Drama)	Bangkok Blossom	Nominated	
2025	4th The People Awards	Popular of the Year		Won	
2025	Maya TV : Superstar Idol Awards	Hot Star Female Idol of the Year		Won	
2025	14th Thai Film Director Awards	Best Actress in Leading Role	The Paradise of Thorns	Runner-up	
2025	The Viral Hits Awards	Best Yuri Couple of the Year (Englot)		Won	
2025	16th Nataraj Awards	Best Actress in Leading Role	Bangkok Blossom	Nominated	
2025	Nineentertain Awards	People Choice Award | Mahachon Award		Nominated	
2025	Nineentertain Awards	Best Actress of the Year		Won	
2025	21st Kom Chad Luek Awards	Best Actress in Film	The Paradise of Thorns	Won	
2025	21st Baannang Klang Lakorn Awards	Best Actress in Leading Role	The Paradise of Thorns	Nominated	
2025	Kazz Awards	People of the Year		Won	
2025	Thailand Y Content Awards	Best Leading Actress	Petrichor: The Series	Nominated	
2025	Thailand Y Content Awards	People's Choice Award		Nominated	
2025	Trust Gu Thai Film Awards	Best Actress in Leading Role	The Paradise of Thorns	Nominated	
2025	FEED x Khaosod Awards	Girl Love Best Leading Actress	Petrichor: The Series	Nominated	
2025	FEED x Khaosod Awards	Popular Actress of the Year		Nominated	
2025	Suphannahong National Film Awards	Best Actress	The Paradise of Thorns	Nominated	
2025	HOWE Awards	Hottest Actress Award		Nominated	
2025	HOWE Awards	The 50 Influential People		Won	
2026	Thairath Best of the Year	Actor of the Year		Won	
2026	The Viral Hits Awards	Best Leading Actress of the Year		Won	
2026	14th Thailand Social Awards	Best Entertainment Figures Performance on Social Media - Actress		Won	
2026	Thailand Box Office Awards	Actress Series of the Year (Series)	Petrichor: The Series	Won	
2026	Nineentertain Awards	People Choice Award – Mahachon Award		Nominated	
2026	Maya TV : Superstar Idol Awards	Best Actress of the Year		Nominated	
2026	Maya TV : Superstar Idol Awards	Idol of the Year		Nominated	
2026	Kazz Awards	Superstar Award		Won	
2026	Love Moment Awards	Mainstream Leading Performance - People's Choice Award		Won	
2026	Love Moment Awards	The People's Heart Power Award		Nominated	
2026	Thailand Y Content Awards	Best Leading Actress	4 Elements: The Water	Pending	

Awards and achievements
Preceded by Suphatra Kliangprom	Miss Grand Bangkok (Winner); 2022	Succeeded by Pimjira Charoenluk
Preceded by Indy Johnson	Miss Grand Thailand (Winner); 2022	Succeeded by Thaweeporn Phingchamrat
Preceded by (Ecuador) Andrea Aguilera	Miss Grand International (1st Runner-Up); 2022	Succeeded by (Myanmar) Ni Ni Lin Eain
