= Show Me Love (TV series) =

- Genre: Romance drama LGBT
- Starring: Charlotte Austin, Engfa Waraha
- Country of origin: Thailand
- Original language: Thai
- No. of seasons: 1
- No. of episodes: 9

Production
- Running time: 43 minutes

Original release
- Release: 28 February – 28 April 2023

Show Me Love (Thai: แค่อยากบอกรัก lit. 'I just want to say I love you') is a thai GL television series starring Charlotte Austin and Engfa Waraha. The show is the first thai GL that is an original production. Based on the real life story of Miss Grand Thailand 2022 and the success of "Englot", the ship name for Engfa and Charlotte, it was the first GL series from Miss Grand Thailand. The show was produced by MGI and it premiered on the GrandTV YouTube channel the on 28 February 2023. The first episode was available to watch for free worldwide while the rest required a paid membership. Later on a re-edited version was made available for all public on the same YouTube channel.

== Synopsis ==
Meena (Engfa Waraha) dreams of becoming a famous singer and decides to move to Bangkok to pursue her singing career. Once there, after a performance, they want to recruit her to compete in the Miss Grand beauty pageant. Initially, she doesn't want to participate, but when she sees how much she would earn monthly, she agrees. That's how she meets and falls in love with Cherine (Charlotte Austin), who works for the same manager and has decided to compete again.

== Cast ==
=== Main ===
- Charlotte Austin as Cherine
- Engfa Waraha as Meena

=== Supporting ===
- Nudee Ornpreeya Nesa Mahmoodi as Lalin
- Chompu Athita Payak as Diana
- Marima Suphatra Kliangprom as Namtan
- Anna Warinthorn Watrsang as Kiki
- Madam Pam Winlaphat Srisakulmekhi as Queenie
- Pom Pritsadee Chantasaro as Keane, Cherine's ex-boyfriend
- White Suti Ruangvittayachote as Ken, Lalin's boyfriend
- Tum Rossarin Jantra as Chat
- Heidi Amanda Jensen as Heidi
- Pich Votey Saravody as Faye

=== Guests ===
- "Emi" Thasorn Klinnium
- Meena Rina Chatamonchai
- Tia Tavee
- Earn Pattaravadee Boonmeesup
- "Pim" Pimjira Jaroenlak

== Awards and nominations ==
Year	Award	Category	Nominee(s)	Result	Ref.
2023	SANOOK Y-VOTE Q2	Best Duo Star of 2nd Quarter -Top-Rated Couple	Charlotte Austin and Engfa Waraha	Won	
2023	SANOOK Y-VOTE Q2	Best Y-Series of 2nd Quarter	Show Me Love	Second place	
2023	SANOOK 2023	Most Fun and Exciting Series of 2023	Show Me Love	Second place	
