= 2020 Maya Awards =

Awarding ceremony given by Maya Channel Magazine

6th Maya Awards
- Presented by: Maya Channel Magazine
- Date: 20 October 2020
- Site: CDC Crystal Grand Ballroom, Bangkok, Thailand

Television coverage
- Network: Maya Channel

The 6th Maya Awards was an awarding ceremony presented by the Maya Channel Magazine, giving recognition to the Thai entertainment industry in the fields of music, film, television and drama for their achievements in the year 2020.

The awards night was held at the CDC Crystal Grand Ballroom, Bangkok, Thailand on Tuesday, 20 October 2020. Voting period for certain categories ran from 1 May 2020 to 10 October 2020.

== Nominees ==
Nominations were announced on 30 April 2020. Winners are listed first and highlighted in bold:

=== Television networks and personalities ===
Entertainment Person of the Year	Television Station Executive of the Year
**Ekkachai Srivichai**	**Ongard Prapakamol, Chief Media Officer of True Corporation & Managing Director of TNN**
Best News Production	Best Television Program
**TNN**	**กิ๊กดู๋ สงครามเพลงเงินล้าน (Kik Duu)** **(PPTV)**
Top Digital Television of the Year
**ONE 31**; Workpoint TV; True4U; GMM 25; MCOT HD; Thairath TV; Channel 3 HD; Amarin TV; Channel 7 HD; PPTV

=== Television ===
Best Male Newscaster	Best Female Newscaster
**Suphapchai Boodchan from Workpoint News**	**Niratchaya Monthong from TNN**
Best Male Program Host	Best Female Program Host
**Siwat Chotchaicharin for** **Ching Roi Ching Lan** **(Workpoint Entertainment)**	**Panadda Wongphudee for** **สุดจัดปนัดดา (Sut Cat Panadda)** **(Amarin TV)**
Best News Analyst	Best Newscaster in Thai Language
**Banjong Cheewamongkolkarn from Workpoint News**	**Tanasorn Amatayakul from Channel 3 HD**
Male Rising Star	Female Rising Star
**Kanin Chobpradit for** **ทิวาซ่อนดาว (Thiwa Son Dao)** **(Channel 3 HD)**	**Mookda Narinrak for** **โซ่เวรี (So Weri)** **(Channel 7 HD)**
Best Television Drama	Best Drama Director
**รักนิรมิต (Rak Niramit) (True4U)**	**Ampaiporn Jitmaingong for My Husband in Law (Channel 3 HD)**
Best Actor	Best Actress
**Pakorn Chatborirak for เพลิงรักเพลิงแค้น (Plerng Rak Plerng Kaen (Channel 3 HD)**; Sukollawat Kanarot for Mister Indy Honey Hipster (Channel 7 HD); Sean Jindachot for ฤกษ์สังหาร (Roek Sanghan) (ONE 31); Andrew Gregson for Voice (True4U); Sunny Suwanmethanont for My Ambulance (ONE 31); Pattaradet Sa-nguankwamdee for มธุรสโลกันตร์ (Mathurot Lokan) (Channel 7 HD); Mick Tongraya for มนตร์กาลบันดาลรัก (Mon Kan Bandan Rak) (Channel 7 HD); Wongsakorn Poramathakorn for ทะเลแปร (Thale Paen) (Amarin TV); Thanapob Leeratanakajorn for หัวใจศิลา (Hua Jai Sila) (ONE 31); Napat Injaiuea for ลูกกรุง (Luk Krung) (ONE 31)	**Peechaya Wattanamontree for สองนรี (Song Naree) (Channel 7 HD)**; Pimchanok Luevisadpaibul for ใบไม้ที่ปลิดปลิว (Bai Mai Tee Plid Plew) (ONE 31); Urassaya Sperbund for กลิ่นกาสะลอง (Klin Kasalong) (Channel 3 HD); Davika Hoorne for My Ambulance (ONE 31); Khemanit Jamikorn for Voice (True4U); Woranuch Bhirombhakdi for วุ่นรักนักข่าว (Woon Rak Nakkao) (PPTV); Maylada Susri for อินทรีแดง (Insi Daeng) (Channel 7 HD); Chiranan Manochaem for วิมานมนตรา (Viman Montra) (Channel 7 HD); Marie Broenner for ลูกกรุง (Luk Krung) (ONE 31); Nuttanicha Dungwattanawanich for เพลิงพรางเทียน (Plerng Phrang Thian) (Channel 3 HD)
Best Supporting Actor	Best Supporting Actress
**Amarin Nitibhon for ทีใครทีมันส์ (Tee Khrai Tee Man) (Channel 3 HD)**; Tanin Manoonsilp for ทุ่งเสน่หา (Toong Sanaeha) (Channel 3 HD); Natthawut Skidjai for Mist of Love (Channel 3 HD); Thiti Mahayotaruk for My Ambulance (ONE 31); Patiparn Patavekarn for ฤกษ์สังหาร (Roek Sanghan) (ONE 31); Masu Junyangdikul for ลับ ลวง ใจ (Lab Luang Jai) (Channel 3 HD); Pongsakorn Mettarikanon for เพลิงพรางเทียน (Plerng Phrang Thian) (Channel 3 HD); Kawee Tanjararak for เกมรักเอาคืน (Kem Rak Ao Khuen) (GMM 25); Poonpat Attapanyapol for สองนรี (Song Naree) (Channel 7 HD); Nattarat Nopparattayaporn for Voice (True4U)	**Siriam Pakdeedumrongrit for หัวใจศิลา (Hua Jai Sila) (ONE 31)**; Sawika Chaiyadech for รักนิรมิต (Rak Niramit) True4U; Kanyawee Songmuang for My Ambulance (ONE 31); Pichukkana Wongsarattanasin for ผมอาถรรพ์ (Pohm Arthan) (Channel 3 HD); Gunnaporn Phungthong for มนตรามหาเสน่ห์ (Montra Maha Sane) (PPTV); Patsita Athianantasak for พรายพิฆาต (Phrai Phikhat) (Channel 7 HD); Thunyaphat Pattarateerachaicharoen for ทุ่งเสน่หา (Toong Saneha) (Channel 3 HD); Phitchanat Sakhakon for ฤกษ์สังหาร (Roek Sanghan) (ONE 31); Raviyanun Takerd for สงครามนักปั้น 2 (Songkhram Nak Pan 2) (ONE 31); Suphaphorn Wongthuaithong for Mist of Love (Channel 3 HD)
Favorite Television Series of the Year	Favorite Television Drama of the Year
**2gether: The Series (GMM 25)**; Until We Meet Again (LINE TV); TharnType (ONE 31); One Year 365 (LINE TV); The Stranded (Netflix); Diamond Eyes: The Series (MONO29); Secret Garden (True4U); ปลายจวัก (Plai Chawak) (Thai PBS); Mother: The Series (LINE TV); Dark Blue Kiss (GMM 25)	**Mist of Love (Channel 3 HD)**
Highest-rated Television Drama of the Year	Best Inspirational Program
**ร้อยป่า (Roi Pah) (Channel 7 HD)**	**ปัญญาปันสุข (Panya Pansuk) (Workpoint TV)**

=== Music ===
Most Popular Male Country Singer	Most Popular Female Country Singer
**Apiwat Boonanak (Kuentin Studio)**; Tree Chainarong (Grammy Gold); Zak Chumpae (Tonmai Music & Studio); Lumplend Wongsaklon (Grammy Gold); Kanet Saloepi (Phodi Muan Studio); Oil Saengsin (Guitar Record); Phot Saindi (ศรีบุญเพ็ง ศรีเอเชีย); Tae Trakooltor (Sing Music); Kong Huayrai (Independent artist); Beer Prompong (Grammy Gold)	**Super Valentine (Topline Music)**; Lily (ค่ายได้หมดถ้าสดชื่น (เพลง เลิกคุยทั้งอำเภอเพื่อเธอคนเดียว)); Nhamtoei Sabangbin (Sabaengbin Studio); Jintara Poonlarp (Independent artist); Takkatan Chonlada (Independent artist); Kratai Pannipa (จ้วดจ้าด Studio); Lamyai Haithongkham; Nescafe Srinakhon (Eurnar Record); Jirapan Boonchit (เซิ้ง Music); Bam Pailin (Smiles Music)
Favorite Thai Singer	Best Official Soundtrack
**Tanont Chumroen (I AM)**; Marie Eugenie Le Lay (SpicyDisc); Supakchaya Sukbaiyen (Independent artist); Du-Omay (Lai Thai Indie); Milli (Yupp!); The TOYS (What The Duck); Olran Chujai (Love Is); Issara Kitnitchi (Independent artist); Chisanucha Tantimedh (White Music); Patsarakorn Chirathivat (Independent artist)	"**ไม่มีนิยาม (Mai Mee Ni Yam)**" **by Tawan Vihokratana & Thitipoom Techaapaikhun from Dark Blue Kiss (GMM 25)**; "ขอแค่เธอ (Kor Kae Tur/Hold Me Tight)" by Chainon Jantem from TharnType (ONE 31); "(รักติดไซเรน) Rak Tid Siren" by Nichaphat Chatchaipholrat & Paris Intarakomalyasut from My Ambulance (ONE 31); "My Everything" by Putthipong Assaratanakul from My Ambulance (ONE 31); "พรหมลิขิต (Prom Likit)" by Napat Injaiuea; "ทุกวันที่สูญใจ (Thuk Wanthi Suk Jai)" by Saksit Vejsupaporn from ฟ้าฝากรัก (Fah Fak Rak) (Channel 3 HD); "อยากหยุดเวลาไว้ (Yak Yut Wela Wai)" by Tanont Chumroen from My Love from the Star (Channel 3 HD); "คาถาหารัก (Katha Ha Rak)" by Sukollawat Kanarot from ยอดรักนักรบ (Yotrak Nakrop) (Channel 7 HD); "สายซับ (Sai Sap)" by BNK48 from One Year 365 (LINE TV); "แรงดึงดูดของความรัก (Raeng Deung Dut Khong Khwam Rak)" by Peechaya Wattanamontree & Mick Tongraya from Saphai Imphot (Channel 7 HD)

=== Special awards ===
Best Commentator	Sexy Star of the Year
**Jakkawal Saothongyuttitum**; Sala Khunnawut; Note Chern-Yim; Siriporn Yooyord; Sunaree Rachasima; Nalin Hohler; Sakuntala Thianphairot; Thanawat Prasitsomporn; Maneenuch Smerasut; Techin Ploypetch	**Karnklao Duaysianklao**; Apissada Kreurkongka; Natapohn Tameeruks; Phitchanat Sakhakon; Sammy Cowell; Cris Horwang; Patcharapa Chaichua; Pimchanok Luevisadpaibul; Kanticha Chumma; Aniporn Chalermburanawong
Male Star	Female Star
**Suppasit Jongcheveevat (GMM 25) for TharnType (One31)**; Prachaya Ruangroj for Turn Left Turn Right (GMM 25); Itthipat Thanit for Shadow of Love (Channel 3 HD); Trisanu Soranun for ฝ่าดงพยัคฆ์ (Fa Dong Phayak) (PPTV); Hussawee Pakrapongpisan for ตะกรุดโทน (Takrut Thon) (Channel 7 HD); Wongravee Nateetorn for My Ambulance (ONE 31); Perawat Sangpotirat for One Night Steal (GMM 25); Jiravich Pongpaijit for ศรีอโยธยา ภาค 2 (Si Ayutthaya Phak 2) (True4U); Oabnithi Wiwattanawarang for รักไม่ลืม (Rak Mai Luem) (ONE 31); Way-Ar Sangngern for เกมรักเอาคืน (Kem Rak Ao Khuen) (GMM 25)	**Oranate Caballes for Shadow of Love (Channel 3 HD)**; Mookda Narinrak for มธุรสโลกันตร์ (Mathurot Lokan) (Channel 7 HD); Yongwaree Ngamkasem for ทะเลแปร (Thale Paer) (Amarin TV); Cherprang Areekul for One Year 365 (LINE TV); Eisaya Hosuwan for แก้วกลางดง (Kaeo Klang Dong) (Channel 3 HD); Sadanun Balenciaga for Shadow of Love (Channel 3 HD); Paphada Klinsuman for ตะกรุดโทน (Takrut Thon) (Channel 7 HD); Ploypailin Thangprapaporn for สุขสันต์วันโสด (Suksan Wan Sot) (Sahamongkol Film); Paparwadee Chansamorn for ขิงก็ร่า ข่าก็แรง (Khing Ko Ra Kha Ko Raeng) (Channel 7 HD); Supassra Thanachat for เขาวานให้หนูเป็นสายลับ (Khao Wan Hai Nu Pen Sailap) (Channel 3 HD)
Best Healthy Star	Best Couple
**Hussawee Pakrapongpisan**	**Suppasit Jongcheveevat and Kanawut Traipipattanapong**; Jumpol Adulkittiporn and Atthaphan Phunsawat; Ranee Campen and Sukollawat Kanarot; Oranate Caballes and Itthipat Thanit; Thitiwat Ritprasert and Natouch Siripongthon; Maylada Susri and Mick Tongraya; Vachirawit Chivaaree and Metawin Opas-iamkajorn; Marie Broenner and Napat Injaiuea; Mookda Narinrak and Pattaradet Sa-nguankwamdee; Suppapong Udomkaewkanjana and Pruk Panich
Charming Boy	Charming Girl
**Tanapon Sukumpantanasan**; Hussawee Pakrapongpisan; Mick Tongraya; Thanapob Leeratanakajorn; Palitchoke Ayanaputra; Prin Suparat; Mario Maurer; Tanawat Wattanaputi; Jirayu Tangsrisuk; Napat Injaiuea	**Maylada Susri**; Davika Hoorne; Natapohn Tameeruks; Urassaya Sperbund; Ranee Campen; Kimberley Anne Woltemas; Cherprang Areekul; Pimprapa Tangprabhaporn; Pimchanok Luevisadpaibul; Peechaya Wattanamontree
Best Creative Television Drama
**ลูกผู้ชายหัวใจทองคำ (Lukphuchai Huachai Thongkham)** **(Channel 5)**
