= Star Hunter Entertainment =

Thai entertainment company

Star Hunter Entertainment Co., Ltd.
- Trade name: Star Hunter Entertainment
- Native name: สตาร์ ฮันเตอร์ เอ็นเตอร์เทนเม้นท์
- Type: Limited company
- Industry: Talent management agency, television production, film production, record label
- Founded: 2018
- Founder: Yotcha Kornhiran
- Area served: Worldwide
- Key people: Yotcha Kornhiran (President)
- Website: starhunterent.com

Star Hunter Entertainment (Thai: สตาร์ฮันเตอร์ เอ็นเตอร์เทนเมนท์) is a Thai entertainment company, television production company and talent agency founded in 2018 by Yotcha Kornhiran (Pi Oh). The company produces television series, films, music and music videos, with a primary focus on boys' love (BL) and girls' love (GL) productions. It is best known for producing series such as Big Dragon (2022), What Zabb Man! (2022), Love Senior (2023), Sunset x Vibes (2024), City of Stars (2024), First Note of Love (2024), Flirt Milk (2025), and My Only Sunshine (2026).

== History ==
Star Hunter Entertainment was founded in Thailand in 2018 and operates as a talent management agency for actors, singers and influencers, while also producing television series and music projects. In 2020, the company produced its first BL series, Gen Y The Series, starring Kimmon Warodom Khemmonta and Copter Panuwat Kerdthongtavee. The series aired on Channel 3 and was streamed on iQIYI. In 2021, it received a second season, Gen Y Season 2, which also aired on Channel 3 and iQIYI.

In 2022, the company released What Zabb Man!, starring Bosszo Thawatchanin Darayon and Bank Toranin Manosudprasit. The series aired on Amarin TV. Later that year, Star Hunter released the BL series Big Dragon, starring Panuwat Sopradit (Mos) and Mondop Heamtan (Bank). The series aired on One 31, iQIYI and Viki.

In 2023, the company released its first GL series, Love Senior, on GMM 25 and iQIYI. The series received a five-episode special the following year. In 2024, the company released the BL series City of Stars on One 31 and iQIYI, starring Job Kris Ahandrik and Porsche Sitha Kanchana-alongkorn. In the same year, it released Sunset x Vibes, starring Panuwat Sopradit (Mos) and Mondop Heamtan (Bank), which also aired on One 31 and iQIYI. In 2025, the company released the BL series Flirt Milk on Amarin TV and iQIYI, starring Neel Kawich Sansai, Phu Purin Phattanawiriyawanich, Newton Waiyakorn Wongkhakaew and Paul Somphop Amatamuntri. In 2026, it released the GL series My Only Sunshine, starring Mercedes Siripath Sarakune and Atom Aphichaya Kamnoetsirikun, on iQIYI.

== Productions ==
=== Television series ===
Year	Title	Original network(s)	Notes	Ref.
2020	Gen Y The Series	Channel 3, iQIYI	The company's first BL series, starring Kimmon Warodom Khemmonta and Copter Panuwat Kerdthongtavee.	
2020	2021	Gen Y Season 2	Channel 3, iQIYI	Second season of Gen Y The Series.
2022	What Zabb Man!	Amarin TV	Starring Bosszo Thawatchanin Darayon and Bank Toranin Manosudprasit.	
2022	Big Dragon	One 31, iQIYI, Viki	Starring Panuwat Sopradit (Mos) and Mondop Heamtan (Bank).	
2024	Love Senior	GMM 25, iQIYI	The company's first GL series.	
2024	Love Senior Special	Amarin TV, WeTV	Five-episode special of Love Senior.	
2024	City of Stars	One 31, iQIYI	Starring Job Kris Ahandrik and Porsche Sitha Kanchana-alongkorn.	
2024	Sunset x Vibes	One 31, iQIYI	Starring Panuwat Sopradit (Mos) and Mondop Heamtan (Bank).	
2025	Flirt Milk	Amarin TV, iQIYI	Starring Neel Kawich Sansai, Phu Purin Phattanawiriyawanich, Newton Waiyakorn Wongkhakaeo and Paul Somphop Amatamuntri.	
2026	My Only Sunshine	iQIYI	Starring Mercedes Siripath Sarakune and Atom Aphichaya Kamnoetsirikun.	

== Upcoming television series ==
Expected year	Title	Original network(s)	Notes	Ref.
2026	Remain	TBA	GL series starring Anda Anunta Teavirat and Lookkaew Kamollak Sangsubsin.	
2026	Time Zone	iQIYI	BL series starring Amas Piopoom, Ikkiw Nithiphat Chatpho and Paul Somphop Amatamuntri.	
2026	True Moon	TBA	BL series starring Arm Napatchai and Dol Noppadol.	
2026	Khom Khlang	WeTV	GL series starring Bint Sireethorn Leearamwat and Puinoon Warangsiri Tanajarusworaphat.	

== Awards and nominations ==
Awards and nominations received by Star Hunter Entertainment
Award	Year	Category	Recipient	Result	Ref.
Asia Top Awards	2023	Best Content Provider	Star Hunter Entertainment	Won	
