= 2019 Maya Awards =

Awarding ceremony given by Maya Channel Magazine

5th Maya Awards
- Presented by: Maya Channel Magazine
- Date: 19 September 2019
- Site: CDC Crystal Grand Ballroom, Bangkok, Thailand

Television coverage
- Network: Maya Channel

The 5th Maya Awards was an awarding ceremony presented by the Maya Channel Magazine, giving recognition to the Thai entertainment industry in the fields of music, film, television and drama for their achievements in the year 2019.

The awards night was held at the CDC Crystal Grand Ballroom, Bangkok, Thailand on Thursday, 19 September 2019.

== Awards ==
Below are the awardees:

=== Television networks and personalities ===
Entertainment Person of the Year	Top Digital Television of the Year
Chalong Pakdeevijit	Workpoint TV
Best News Production	Best Sports TV Program
Nation TV	Golf Channel Thailand
Most Sought-After Artist	Long Live TV Program
Mayurin Pongpudpunth	Chumtangdaotong (Channel 7)
Television Person of Honor
Khematat Pholdet, President of MCOT

=== Television ===
Best Male Newscaster	Best Female Newscaster
Supachok Opasakhun from Amarin TV	Khemasorn Nukao from Thairath TV
Best Male Program Host	Best Female Program Host
Varavuth Jentanakul for Sing Your Face Off (Channel 7)	Panita Tumwattana for Kuizap Show (One 31)
Best News Analyst	Best Drama Director
Bakban Boonlert (Nation TV)	Samruay Rakchat for Satta Ya Thit Than (Channel 3)
Male Rising Star	Female Rising Star
Hussawee Pakrapongpisan for Jao Saming (Channel 7)	Supapong Wongthongthong for Angkor (Channel 3)
Best Television Drama	Best Action Drama
In Family We Trust (One 31)	Sarawat Yai (Channel 7)
Best Actor	Best Actress
Jirayu Tangsrisuk for Krong Kam (Channel 3)	Maylada Susri for Pachara Montra (Channel 7)
Best Supporting Actor	Best Supporting Actress
Kelly Thanapat for Leh Ruk Bussaba (Channel 7)	Marie Broenner (One 31)
Favorite TV Series of the Year
Krong Kam (Channel 3) by Act-Art Generation

=== Movies ===
Best Actor	Best Actress
Thaneth Warakulnukroh for Pro May by Transformation Films	Phantira Pipityakorn for Inhuman Kiss by Transformation Films
Best Supporting Actor	Best Supporting Actress
Jason Young for Friend Zone by GDH 559	Hattaya Wongkrachang for Pro May by Transformation Films
Best Screenplay	Best Film Director
Friend Zone by GDH 559	Pongpat Wachirabunjong for Nakee 2 by Search Entertainment
Best Movie
Nakee 2 by Search Entertainment

=== Music ===
Favorite Male Singer	Favorite Female Singer
Perawat Sangpotirat from GMMTV	Napassorn Phuthornjai and Piyanut Sueajongpru from GMM Grammy
Most Popular Male Country Singer	Most Popular Female Country Singer
Han Band from Guitar Record	Tai Orathai from Grammy Gold
Hot New Singer	Best Official Soundtrack
ActArt Band from Battery Music	"Siang Kong Tub" from Sai Lohit (Channel 7)

=== Special awards ===
Most Popular Social Media TV	Best Comeback Star
LINE TV	Yuranunt Pamornmontri for Bai Mai Tee Plid Plew (One 31)
Male Star	Female Star
Itthipat Thanit for Nong Mai Rai Borisut The Series (Channel 3)	Hana Lewis for Diamond Armor Rose (Channel 7)
Best Healthy Star	Best Couple
Stephany Auernig from Channel 7	Atthaphan Phunsawat and Jumpol Adulkittiporn from GMMTV
Best Drama for Family and Society	Best Inspirational Program
Phrungni Cha Mai Mi Mae Laeo (LINE TV)	SUPER 100 (Workpoint TV)
Charming Boy	Charming Girl
Prachaya Ruangroj from GMMTV	Pattarasaya Kreuasuwansri
