= Waiyakorn Wongkhakaew =

Thai actor

- ไวยากรณ์ วงค์ขาแก้ว
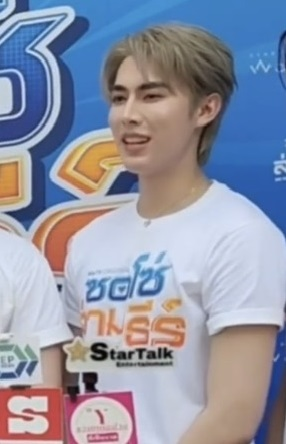
- Newton in 2026
- Born: 3 August 1998 (age 28); Narathiwat, Thailand
- Other name: Newton (นิวตัน)
- Occupation: Actor
- Years active: 2020–present
- Agent: Headliner Thailand

Waiyakorn Wongkhakaew (Thai: ไวยากรณ์ วงค์ขาแก้ว; born 3 August 1998), professionally known as Newton (Thai: นิวตัน), is a Thai actor and singer. He made his television debut in 2021 as a contestant on the One31 reality competition LAZ iCON. He is known for his roles in the television series Love Senior Special (2024) on WeTV and Amarin TV, Flirt Milk (2025) on Amarin TV and iQIYI, and Be My Player Two (2026) on WeTV. In 2026, he joined the cast of the TrueVisions NOW series Butsaba Siang Trin.

== Biography and career ==
Born in Narathiwat Province, Newton graduated with a bachelor's degree in Business Administration (English Program) from Prince of Songkla University, Hat Yai Campus.

In 2021, he competed in the One31 reality competition LAZ iCON, making his television debut. In 2022, he participated in Star Hunter Entertainment's year-end event as one of the agency's artists. He made his acting debut in the BL series Sunset x Vibes in 2024, and later that year appeared in the GL series Love Senior Special.

In 2025, Newton portrayed Pharong in Flirt Milk, joining the main cast opposite Somphop Armartmoontree (Paul). The two were promoted together as the on-screen pairing "NewPaul".

In 2026, he worked as a model at Harbin Fashion Week in Harbin, China.

Later that year, he left Star Hunter Entertainment and joined Headliner Thailand. He was subsequently cast as Ten ("TEN10"), a member of the Blue Viper team, in the BL series Be My Player Two, alongside Natsakan Chairote.

== Filmography ==
=== Television ===
Year	Title	Role	Notes	Network
2024	Sunset x Vibes	Pim's Boyfriend	Guest role	One 31, iQIYI
2024	Love Senior Special	Kirin	Supporting role	Amarin TV, WeTV
2025	Flirt Milk	Pharong	Main role	Amarin TV, One 31, iQIYI
2026	Be My Player Two	Ten ("TEN10")	Supporting role	WeTV
2026	Butsaba Siang Trin	Khobut	Supporting role	TrueVisions NOW

== Television shows ==
Year	Title	Role	Network
2020	SosatSeoulsay	Guest (Episode 276)	YouTube
2021	LAZ iCON	Contestant	One 31 / Lazada Thailand
2026	Buddy Boys	Regular cast member	One 31 / YouTube

== Music videos ==
Year	Title	Artist	Role
2022	เธอคือของขวัญ (Best Gift)	Star Hunter Artists	Appearance

== Specials ==
Year	Title	Role	Platform
2024	Merry Christmas & happy new year	Participant	YouTube

== Discography ==
=== Promotional singles ===
Year	Title	Artist	Notes
2021	Last One	LAZ iCON contestants	Promotional single

== Awards and nominations ==
Year	Award	Category	Result	Ref.
2024	TikTok Awards Thailand	Creator of the Year Beauty and Fashion	Nominated	
