= List of magazines in Thailand =

Magazines formed a major component of the Thai publishing industry in 20th century. Printed Thai-language serial publications began with The Bangkok Recorder in 1844, but it wasn't until after the abolition of absolute monarchy in 1932 that a distinct genre of magazines, as opposed to newspapers, began to form, prominently featuring fiction and lifestyle-related content. Magazine publishing experienced a boom in the late 20th century and the 2000s, diversifying into many niche titles, numbering over 400 at its peak. However, they sharply declined as a result of digital disruption in the 2010s, and many have since either converted to online-only or ceased publication entirely.

== Print magazines by genre ==
=== Art and design ===
- B1 (? to 2015–2017)
- Creative Thailand (2009–?)
- Happening (2007–2015)
- iDesign (? to 2015–2017)
- Wallpaper* Thai edition (? to 2015–2017)

=== Automotive ===
- 4Wheels (1992–present)
- Car Thailand (?–2017)
- Formula (?–?)
- Option Thailand (1981–2017)

=== Business ===
- BrandAge (?–?)
- Manager monthly (1983–?)
- Monograph (2015–?)

=== Comics and manga ===
- C-Kids (1994–2016)

=== Celebrity gossip ===
- Hamburger (2002–2015)
- Hello! Thailand (2006–present)
- Maya Channel (?–present)
- Oho (2008–2015)
- Oops! (2004–2016)
- Who (2008–2016)
- Zupzip (2009–2015)

=== Fashion ===
- Dont (2010–?)
- Harper's Bazaar Thailand (2005–present)
- Image (1988–2016)
- Kazz (?–present)
- Lips (1999–?)
- L'Officiel Thailand (2011–present)
- Vogue Thailand (2013–present)

=== Film ===
- Bioscope (2000–2022)
- Moving Picture News (1922–1927)
- The Hollywood Reporter Thailand (2016–2017)

=== Food and health ===
- Health & Cuisine (?–2017)
- Krua (1994–2017)
- Cheewajit (?–present)
- Sook (2014–?)

=== Knowledge and general interest ===
- A Day (2000–?)
- A Day Bulletin (2008–?)
- Art & Culture (1979–present)
- Darunowat (1874–?)
- Muse Mag (2011–?)
- National Geographic Thailand (?–present)
- Thawi Panya (1904–1907)
- Sarakadee (1985–present)
- The Siam Pra Bheth (1897–1898)
- Way (2006–?)

=== Lifestyle ===
- 247 (2007–?)
- BK Magazine (2005–present)
- Giraffe (2014–2017)
- Koo Sang Koo Som (1980–2017)
- Lips Love (2015–?)

=== Men's ===
- GM (1985–?)
- GQ Thailand (2014–present)
- Lips Garçon (2015–?)
- Men's Health (2006–2017)

=== Music ===
- Billboard Thailand (2016–2017)
- The Guitar Mag (1969–present)

=== News and politics ===
- Matichon Weekly (1980–present)
- Manager Weekend (2008–present)
- Nation Weekend (1992–2017)

=== Shelter magazines ===
- Baan Lae Suan (1976–present)

=== Travel ===
- Barefoot (? to 2015–2017)

=== Women's ===
- Cleo Thailand (1997–2019)
- Cosmopolitan Thailand (1997–2016)
- Dichan (1977–2017)
- Elle Thailand (1994–present)
- Her World Thailand (2004 to 2015–2017)
- In Magazine (2005 to 2015-2017)
- Kullastree (1970–present)
- Kunlasatri (1906–?)
- Kwanruen (1968–present)
- Lalana (1973–1995)
- Lemonade (2011–2016)
- Lips Palette (2015–?)
- Lisa (? to 2015–2017)
- Madame Figaro Thailand (?–2017)
- Marie Claire Thailand (2004–2017)
- Narirom (1906–1907)
- Ploy Kaem Petch (1992–2016)
- Praew (1978–present)
- Priew (1981–2015)
- Sakulthai (1954–2016)
- Satree Sarn (1948–1996)
- Seventeen Thailand (2002–2016)
- Sudsapda (1983–2019)
- Volume (2005–2016)
- We (? to 2015–2017)
- Women's Health (?–2017)

=== Youth ===
- Cheeze (2006–?)
- I Like (2001–2016)
