= Napapa Tantrakul =

Thai actress (born 1986)

- ณปภา ตันตระกูล
- Born: Waranya Tantrakul; 16 July 1986 (age 40); Yan Nawa, Bangkok, Thailand
- Other names: Patt; Suleeporn Tantrakul
- Occupation: Actress
- Years active: 2003–present
- Partner(s): Akarakit Worarojcharoendet (m. 2016; sep. 2018) Chanon Wong-ngamkham (m. 2023)
- Children: Akaranan Worarojcharoendet; Napapat Tantrakul

Napapa Tantrakul (Thai: ณปภา ตันตระกูล; RTGS: Napapha Tantrakun, born 16 July 1986), also known by the nickname Patt and previously by the given name Suleeporn (ศุลีพร), is a Thai actress who has been active in the entertainment industry since she was 11–12 years old. Tantrakul was married to Akarakit “Benz Racing” Worarojcharoendet.

Tantrakul was born on 16 July 1986 to a Thai family of partial Pakistani and Hainanese descent. Tantrakul was raised Muslim. In 2016, Tantrakul converted to Buddhism.

== Filmography ==
=== Television dramas ===
- 2006 Kaw Morn Bai Nun Tee Tur Fun Yam Nun as Nid
- 2006 (ทีเด็ด ครูพันธุ์ใหม่จิตพิสัยเดือด) (Broadcast Thai Television/Ch.3) as
- 2005 Likisat Hua Jai (ลิขสิทธิ์หัวใจ) (Quiz&Quest/Ch.3) as Mai
- 2005 Barb Rak Talay Fun (บาปรักทะเลฝัน) (Quiz&Quest/Ch.3) as Umaporn
- 2006 Ruen Naree See Chompoo (เรือนนารีสีชมพู) (Maker J Group/Ch.3)
- 2006 Hima Tai Prajun (หิมะใต้พระจันทร์) (Red Drama/Ch.3) as In
- 2006 Tay Jai Rak Nak Wang Pan (เทใจรักนักวางแผน) (Five Fingers Productions/Ch.3)
- 2007 Ram Pissaward (แรมพิศวาส) (Polyplus entertainment/Ch.3)
- 2007 Mae Krua Kon Mai (แม่ครัวคนใหม่) (Step Aonvert/Ch.3)
- 2007 Mafia Tee Ruk (2007) (มาเฟียที่รัก) (METTA & MAHANIYOM/Ch.3)
- 2008 King Kaew Kar Fak (กิ่งแก้วกาฝาก) (Maker Group/Ch.3) as King Kanok & Kaew Ked
- 2008 Ruk Sorn Kaen (รักซ่อนแค้น) (Polyplus Entertainment/Ch.3) as Namneung
- 2008 Ruk Ter Yord Ruk (2008) (รักเธอยอดรัก) (Five Fingers Productions/Ch.3) as Umwika
- 2009 Mon Ruk Kao Tom Mud (2009) (มนต์รักข้าวต้มมัด) (Polyplus Entertainment/Ch.3) as Chormuang
- 2009 Jao Por Jum Pen (เจ้าพ่อจำเป็นกับเจ้าหนูนินจา) (TV Thunder/Ch.3) as Orlada
- 2009 SanaeHa Ngern Tra (เสน่หาเงินตรา) (Step Aonvert/Ch.3) as Farida
- 2009 Theptida Pla Rah (เทพธิดาปลาร้า) (Suk San Hun Sa 52/Ch.3) as Bai Mon/Mai Tong
- 2010 3 Hua Jai (สามหัวใจ) (Akarapon Productions/Ch.3) as Chom
- 2010 Pleng Ruk Rim Khob Fah (เพลงรักริมขอบฟ้า) (Master One VDO Production/Ch.3) as Neera or Namtan
- 2011 Sapai Mai Rai Sakdena (สะใภ้ไม่ไร้ศักดินา) (TV Scene & Picture/Ch.3) as Panaree kitjaluk (Namkaeng)
- 2011 Theptida Pla Rah 2 (เทพธิดาปลาร้าไห 2) (Suk San Hun Sa 52/Ch.3) as Bai Mon/Mai Tong
- 2011 Mae Pua Tabun Fai Mae Yai Talai Plerng (แม่ผัวตะบันไฟ แม่ยายตะไลเพลิง) (TV Thunder/Ch.3) as Mei Lin
- 2012 Rak Prakasit (2012) (รักประกาศิต) (Maker Y/Ch.3) as Supattana
- 2012 Baan Nok Kao Krung (บ้านนอกเข้ากรุง) (Quiz&Quest/Ch.3) as Dao-Nil Susak
- 2013 Ai Koon Pee (ไอ้คุณผี) (Maker K/Ch.3) as Jeerin
- 2014 Koo Plub Salub Rang (คู่ปรับสลับร่าง) (Maker K/Ch.3) as Thiamfah
- 2014 The Rising Sun: Roy Ruk Hak Liam Tawan (The Rising Sun: รอยรักหักเหลี่ยมตะวัน) (Maker K/Ch.3) as Mizawa Aiko
- 2014 Rodfai Ruemay Likay Kongtai (รถไฟ เรือเมล์ ลิเก กองถ่าย) (Akarapon Productions/Ch.3) as Pimphatchara Poonpattanasuk
- 2015 Mor Pee Cyber 2015 (หมอผีไซเบอร์) (Good Feeling/Ch.3) as Prai Saitarn/Chonticha (Twin Character)
- 2015 Song Huajai Nee Puea Tur (สองหัวใจนี้เพื่อเธอ) (Sonix Boom 2013/Ch.3) as Champagne
- 2018 Kaew Kumpun (แก้วกุมภัณฑ์) (D-One TV/Ch.3) as Yaowamarn / Yaem
- 2019 Buang Nareumit (บ่วงนฤมิต) (Who & Who/Ch.3)
- 2019 Thong Eak Mor Ya Tah Chaloang (ทองเอก หมอยา ท่าโฉลง) (Sonix Boom 2013/Ch.3) as Chongko
- 2019 Game Rak Ao Keun (เกมรักเอาคืน) (/GMM 25) as Gaysiri
- 2021 Duang Tah Tee Sarm (ดวงตาที่สาม) (Citizen Kane/Ch.3) as Bhanchoun
- 2022 Suptar 2550 (ซุปตาร์ 2550) (Citizen Kane/Ch.3) as Pim
- 2023 Khru Phensri and Ghoul Lady (ครูเพ็ญศรีกับเลดี้ปอบ) (B Movie/Workpoint TV) as Lady
- 2023 Mor Luang (Royal Doctor) (หมอหลวง) (Sonix Boom 2013/Ch.3) as Phad
- 20 Sai Lap Sabud Chor (สายลับสะบัดช่อ) (/Ch.3) as Parina

=== Television series ===
- 2019 Club Friday The Series: Season 11 (Club Friday the Series 11 รักไม่ได้ออกอากาศ ตอน รักนอกกฎ) (/GMM 25) as Sin (ซิน) with Witaya Wasukraipaisarn

=== Master of Ceremony: MC ===
Television

- 2012 : รายการ ตะลุยกองถ่าย On Air Ch.3 (2012-2013)
- 2015 : รายการ พราวเสน่ห์ ภายหลังเปลี่ยนชื่อเป็น พราวสตอรี่ On Air Ch.8
- 2015 : รายการ E-Entertainment (อีเอนเตอร์เทนเมนท์) On Air Ch.8
- 2015 : รายการ เสียงสวรรค์ พิชิตฝัน ภายหลังเปลี่ยนชื่อเป็น เสียงสวรรค์ ขวัญใจมหาชน On Air Ch.3
- 2015 : รายการ We Beauty On Air Shop77
- 2015 : รายการ บ้านข่าวบันเทิง On Air 3SD (28) (2015-2016)
- 2015 : รายการ At Ten Day (ผลิตรายการโดย 2020 ENTERTAINMENT) เสาร์ 15.00-16.00 น. On Air Ch.3 (เริ่มวันที่ 1 สิงหาคม 2558-ปัจจุบัน ร่วมกับ Wittawat Sunthonwinet
- 2015 : Variety@home On Air Amarin TV
- 2016 : รายการ เสียงสวรรค์พิชิตล้าน On Air Ch.8
- 2018 : (ผู้หญิงถึงผู้หญิง) On Air Ch.3 (2017-2019)
- 2018 : Shair Khao Sao Satrong (แชร์ข่าวสาวสตรอง) (Polyplus Entertainment) Every morning Monday - Friday from 10:00 a.m. to 11:00 a.m. with Pimonwan Hoonthongkam, Puttachat Pongsuchat, Taksaorn Paksukcharern (starting May 7, 2018 – present)
- 2019 : (ผู้หญิงยกกำลังแจ๋ว) ทุกวันจันทร์ถึงวันศุกร์ เวลา 08.00-08.20 น. On Air Ch.3 ร่วมกับ ปุณยวีร์ สุขกุลวรเศรษฐ์, อภิสรา นุตยกุล, สุภาพร วงษ์ถ้วยทอง (เริ่มวันที่ 1 ตุลาคม 2562-ปัจจุบัน)
- 2018 : Snatch Million (เกมกระชากล้าน ซีซั่นที่ 2) On Air Amarin TV with Willy McIntosh
- 2019 : Tok Man Ban Teing (ตกมันส์บันเทิงสุดสัปดาห์) On Air Ch.9 (2019-2021)
- 2019 : Let Me In Season 4 Reborn On Air Workpoint TV with Warattaya Nilkuha, JakJaan Akhamsiri (2019)
- 2019 : Mission Idol ภารกิจลับซุปตาร์ On Air One 31 with Atthama Chiwanitchaphan, Chompoo Konbai (2019)
- 2019 : Souy Roy Saeb (สวย รวย แซ่บ) Every Monday - Friday from 6:00 p.m. - 7:00 p.m. On Air GMM 25 with Sakaojai Poonsawatd, Ubonwan Boonrod, Sujira Arunpipat, Tanyares Ramnarong (2019-2020)
- 2019 : Yud Jak Nak Rong (ยุทธจักรนักร้อง) On Air One 31 (2019)
- 2021 : Mae Wha Dai (แม่ว่าได้) (Yuenton Studio) On Air Thairath TV with Warinda Damrongphol, Panita Tumwattana (starting March 2, 2021 – May 31, 2021)
- 2021 : รายการ เผ็ดมันส์บันเทิง (ผลิตรายการโดย) ทุกวันจันทร์ถึงวันศุกร์ เวลา 11.10 น. On Air Ch.8 (เริ่มวันที่ 23 พฤษภาคม 2564-ปัจจุบัน) ร่วมกับ Anna TV-Pool, Primrata Dejudom, อรรณพ ทองบริสุทธิ์ (เริ่มวันจันทร์ที่ 8 มีนาคม พ.ศ. 2564-ปัจจุบัน)
- 2022 : Ting Khao Sud Sub Da (ติ่งข่าวสุดสัปดาห์) (Workpoint Entertainment) Every Sunday from 9:00 a.m. to 9:30 a.m. On Air Workpoint TV (starting August 14, 2022 – present)

Online

- 20 : รายการ ปลอมป่ะล่ะ On Air Online
- 20 : รายการ The bike idol On Air Online Workpoint TV
- 20 : รายการ แม่ว่าแม่รู้ On Air Online GMM 25
- 2019 : รายการ PatNapapa On Air Youtube:PatNapapa (14 มีนาคม 2562)

=== Music video appearance ===
- 20 () - (/YouTube:)
