= True Moon =

Upcoming Thai television series

- Official pilot poster
- Thai: เดือนหลงเดือน
- Genre: Boys' love; Romantic drama
- Based on: 3 Words 8 Letters by Aiden Black
- Starring: Dol Noppadol; Arm Napatchai
- Country of origin: Thailand
- Original language: Thai

Production
- Production company: Star Hunter Entertainment

True Moon (Thai: เดือนหลงเดือน) is an upcoming Thai boys' love (BL) romantic drama television series produced by Star Hunter Entertainment. The series stars Dol Noppadol and Arm Napatchai, with Panuwat Sopradit (Mos) and Pin Danita Choktadaporn in supporting roles.

The series is based on the novel 3 Words 8 Letters (เดือนหลงเดือน) by Aiden Black (Aiden N Vivienne), who also wrote the novel Big Dragon (มังกรกินใหญ่). As of July 2026, the official pilot trailer has accumulated more than 1.3 million views on YouTube.

== Synopsis ==
Pat (Dol Noppadol), the Moon of the Faculty of Engineering and heir to a wealthy family, crosses paths with Kong (Arm Napatchai), the runner-up Moon of the Faculty of Architecture, who works to support himself. After Kong mistakenly believes that Pat is responsible for the end of his relationship, a confrontation between the two unexpectedly ends with a kiss. As they grow closer, they begin to navigate their developing feelings while facing differences in their backgrounds, social status and lifestyles.

== Cast ==
=== Main ===
- Dol Noppadol as Pat
- Arm Napatchai as Kong

=== Supporting ===
- Pin Danita Choktadaporn as Paeng
- Panuwat Sopradit as Mangkorn
- Tenon Teachapat Pinrat
- Bua Buachumpoo Homdork
- Jeffy Chonsit Boonkhiri
- Nunnat Sena
- Lilly Nguyen

== Production ==
True Moon was first announced in January 2023 when Star Hunter Entertainment launched the Star Hunter Final Casting Project Series 2023, an audition project to recruit new actors for five planned television series, including True Moon.

In April 2023, Star Hunter Entertainment officially confirmed True Moon as part of the Star Hunter Project Line Up 2023, which consisted of five television series, two films and two music projects.

During the Star Hunter Project Line Up 2023 event in May 2023, the company's first official pilot trailer for the series was released.

On 12 November 2024, during the Star Hunter Project Line Up 2025 event held at EM GLASS @ EMSPHERE in Bangkok, Star Hunter Entertainment premiered a new pilot trailer for True Moon and introduced Dol Noppadol and Arm Napatchai as the series' lead actors.
