= Flirt Milk =

2025 Thai television series

- Official poster
- Thai: รักรสนมจืด
- Genre: Boys' love; Romance
- Directed by: ToTo Worawut Tangkawiboon
- Starring: Poohrin Pattanawiriyawanich; Neel Kawich Sansai; Newton Waiyakorn Wongkhakaew; Paul Somphop Armartmoontree; Thunyaphat Inyawilert; Putticha Boonyamas
- Opening theme: "Best Thing (ดีที่สุดแล้ว)" by JJ Rathasat
- Country of origin: Thailand
- Original language: Thai
- No. of episodes: 10

Production
- Running time: 45–50 minutes

Original release
- Network: Amarin TV; iQIYI
- Release: 8 February – 12 April 2025

Flirt Milk, also known as The Taste of Fresh Milk, is a Thai BL television series that originally aired from January to March 2025 on Amarin TV, and was later broadcast on One31. The series was also made available internationally through iQIYI and on the official YouTube channel of Star Hunter Entertainment.

== Synopsis ==
Nomjuet, a reserved university senior, unexpectedly becomes close to the carefree freshman Phra-ek. Despite their contrasting personalities, the two gradually grow closer while navigating university life and their feelings for each other. The story also follows the relationships between Pharong and Phai, and Yingyam and Beauty, as each couple faces its own challenges and experiences.

== Cast ==
=== Main ===
- Kawich Sansai (Neel) as Nomjuet
- Poohrin Pattanawiriyawanich (Pooh) as Phra-ek
- Waiyakorn Wongkhakaew (Newton) as Pharong
- Somphop Armartmoontree (Paul) as Phai
- Thunyaphat Inyawilert (Noon) as Yingyam
- Putticha Boonyamas (Praewa) as Beauty

=== Supporting ===
- Fong Bovorn Kongnawdee as Kornthep
- JJ Rathasat Butwong as Somchat
- Pete Wacharanon Seeduan as Pomprap
- Amus as Nong Noei
- Pin Danita Choktadaporn as Jan

=== Guest ===
- Tenon Teachapat Pinrat as Tan

== Soundtrack ==
Flirt Milk Soundtrack
No.	Title	Artist	Length
1.	""Best Thing (ดีที่สุดแล้ว)""	JJ Rathasat	4:49

== Production ==
The series was announced as part of Star Hunter Entertainment's 2023 project lineup, which was unveiled on 11 April 2023. It was one of five television series introduced by the company for the year, alongside Mueang Feung Nakhon, Duean Long Duean, Love Senior, and Phi Wak Kha Rak Nu Dai Mai!? The company also stated that it had cast a largely new group of lead actors for the productions. The series was developed by Star Hunter Entertainment, directed by Worawut Thanamatchaicharoen and written by Chim Sedthawut Inboon. Yot Kornherun served as executive producer.

== Broadcast ==
Flirt Milk premiered on 25 January 2025 on Amarin TV, airing weekly until 29 March 2025. In August 2025, the series also began airing on One31. Internationally, it was released via iQIYI and on Star Hunter Entertainment's official YouTube channel.

== Reception ==
Sudsapda listed Flirt Milk among notable BL productions of 2025. Vogue Thailand published an interview with the lead actors.
