= Khom Khlang =

2026 Thai television series

- Official series poster
- Thai: ข่มขลัง
- Genre: Girls' love; Supernatural drama; Romance
- Based on: Formidable Eyes by Luxurious.W
- Screenplay by: Chalermpong Udomsilp; Puwadon Naosopa; Luxurious.W
- Directed by: Puwadon Naosopa
- Starring: Sireethorn Leearamwat; Warangsiri Tanajarusworaphat
- Music by: Zom Marie
- Country of origin: Thailand
- Original language: Thai
- No. of episodes: 10

Production
- Executive producers: Yot Kornherun; Chanan Laprananrung
- Cinematography: Ratchanon Kaeosaart
- Production company: Star Hunter Entertainment

Original release
- Network: WeTV
- Release: 7 September 2026

Khom Khlang (Thai: ข่มขลัง) is a 2026 Thai girls' love supernatural drama television series starring Sireethorn Leearamwat (Bint) and Warangsiri Tanajarusworaphat (Puinoon). Directed by Puwadon Naosopa (Mi), it is based on 'Formidable Eyes' by Luxurious.W. It is produced by Star Hunter Entertainment in collaboration with WeTV, and receives support from the Department of Cultural Promotion, under Thailand's Ministry of Culture. The series is noted for helping spread Thai culture and supernatural beliefs globally through 'soft power'.

The series premiered on 7 September 2026, and is expected to conclude on 10 November 2026. It was also released on Amarin TV on 20 September. Episodes 8-10 were released a week ahead of schedule on WeTV for users who paid an extra fee.

== Synopsis ==
A rational police lieutenant is forced to seek help from a sacred master when her investigation into a human trafficking gang leads her to Phop Phra district, where magic and the dark arts are a prominent way of life for many. Initially skeptical about the master's faith, her world-view is challenged when she encounters ancient sacred rituals, supernatural beings, and occult practices. As the investigation deepens, so does the attraction between both women.

== Cast and Characters ==
=== Main ===
- Sireethorn Leearamwat (Bint) as Chanwara Kritpirat (Mae Kru/Master Bulan)
  - A highly respected sacred master in the Phop Phra district, Tak province of Western Thailand. Master Bulan specialises in Sak Yant, a traditional tattoo practice, along with other various sacred arts such as sorcery and exorcism. She's a calm, composed, and stern woman who mostly keeps to herself, and holds her craft in high regard, often seen at her sanctum and major merit-making ceremonies. She was instructed years ago by her late father, a formidable master himself, to wait for the arrival of her karmic soulmate. Leearamwat was cast after she was invited to audition for the role by Kornherun, herself being a fan of the novel prior to that. Punnicha Suttitrum (Poon) plays a younger Bulan.
- Warangsiri Tanajarusworaphat (Puinoon) as Lieutenant Phitcha Ruechakun (Peem)
  - A fearless, confident police officer from a wealthy family in Bangkok. Lieutenant Peem is highly dedicated to her work, and holds fresh grief from losing her younger sister to suicide, who was kidnapped and blackmailed by Krating's gang. She doesn't believe in magic and spirits, but carries a Garuda talisman with her for protection. Highly trained in combat and firearms, Peem often puts herself in danger to help others.

=== Supporting ===
- Kamollak Sangsubsin (Lookkaew) as Natinee Tangjareon (Lom), Bulan's chief disciple.
  - A bright, mischievous 24 year old who yearns to meet her soulmate, but persistently fails to cross paths with them. Lom provides Peem with insight on Bulan and their karmic bond, and is a supportive presence around their relationship.
- Anunta Teavirat (Anda) as Ratha, a mysterious woman who attends the Krua Tan Procession.
- Raveewit Jirapongkanon (Boom) as Por Kru/Master Zai
  - Bulan's estranged older brother who is a master in the dark arts. He is a cruel, unstable man who yearned for his father's approval, and despises Bulan for inheriting their father's sacred arts, and the family's powerful tiger spirit.
- Krid Channongsruang as Sergeant Piak
  - A friendly and playful police officer at the Phop Phra police station. He moved to Phop Phra decades ago after falling in love with a local woman, and is a firm believer of magic, as seen by his habit of passing offered food under his legs to dispel charms and curses.
- Sarahat Boonyanan as Krating
  - The cruel leader of a human trafficking gang that kidnaps underage girls and films their sexual assault to blackmail them. He possesses tattoos given by a master to make himself invulnerable to bullets, thus evading capture from the police. He is cocky and arrogant, likes to taunt his opponents, and shows no remorse for his harmful actions.
- Ampa Phusit (Aew) as Ratchaphorn
  - A gold shop tycoon and Peem's grandmother. She is a kind person who preaches Buddhist virtues, and goes out of her way to help Peem in her relationship with Bulan.
- Nattarinee Karnasuta (Mink) as Ratchapee
  - Peem's wealthy mother who opposes her relationship with Bulan.
- Phanuwat Thawinjindarat (Oh) as Phakin
  - A police lieutenant general and Peem's father. He advises Peem to seek out Bulan for the consecrated bullets due to a similar case years ago with Bulan's father.
- Pitchet Priabyodying (Moss) as Seua
  - A sleazy steel shop owner who is persistent in his romantic pursuit of Peem, going as far as asking Bulan to tattoo a charm yantra on him. He is the son of one of In's sacred masters, and has former ties with Krating.
- Yasaka Chaisorn (Pu) as Por Kru/Master In
  - Bulan's late father and a well-respected master who passed on his sacred arts to Bulan before his death. Phakin's superior officer approached him many years ago to forge powerful bullets inscribed with sorcery to take down a criminal with an Invulnerability Sak Yant tattooed on him.
- Chatthip Kaewkul as Preaw, Piak's daughter.
  - Piak's oldest child and Stephan's on-and-off girlfriend who takes a liking to Peem.
- Nisarat Intasut as Stephan, Preaw's on-and-off girlfriend.
- Krisz Ahandrik (Job) as Inspector Chon
  - A police officer from the Mae Sot Provincial Police Station who helps Peem and Piak in their investigation into Krating.

=== Guest ===
- Kasama Kranjanawattana (Jame) as Phuvaphatch Reuchakun (Phu), Peem's younger brother.
- Unna Athikomchakorn as Pichapat Reuchakun (Phat), Peem and Phu's younger sister who committed suicide after being sexually assaulted and blackmailed by Krating's gang.
- Thanaphat Imkiat as Thong, a kuman thong under Bulan's care.
- Chomphunuch Tansatien (Honey) as Faii, Preaw's friend who is involved with Krating.
- Pintira Singhaseem (Tonaoy) as Seejan, a maechi who is Bulan's mother and In's wife.
- Dangtawan Ho (Scene) as Tubtim, a watermelon smoothie seller at the Krua Tan Festival.

== Original soundtrack ==
No.	Title	Music	Artist	Length
1.	"ไสยเวทมนตรา (Siyweth Mantra)"	เกรียงเดช ผลทวี	Surapol Thongduang	2:18
2.	"ขังหัวใจ (Cage)"	Sakdithat Tuwichian & Zom Marie	Zom Marie	3:50
3.	"มนต์ขลัง (Mon Khlang)"	Nato Narathip	เก๋ วรรณ์ฐกานต์ (Kae Wanthakan) & เค ปิยวัฒน์	3:10

== Episodes ==
No.	Title	Original release date
1	"Episode 1"	7 September 2026
While pursuing the criminal Krating, Lieutenant Peem discovers that he possesses invulnerable skin before he escapes. Her brother Phu is injured in the pursuit, leading her to seek out a spiritual master in Phop Phra for bullets that can pierce through impenetrable skin. Her first meeting with Master Bulan ended in strife due to her lack of faith in the sacred arts, but when dark spirits haunt her in her sleep, she returns to Bulan for help. Peem requests a transfer to Phop Phra so she could hunt down Krating and convince Bulan to make her the bullets. Bulan realises that Peem is the karmic soulmate she has been waiting for.
2	"Episode 2"	14 September 2026
Bulan visits Peem at the Phop Phra police station to bring her food. Peem refuses, and visits the town instead with Sergeant Piak. At a nearby school, Bulan intervenes a spiritual possession on a student, but Peem interrupts the ritual to Bulan's dismay. The spirit latches onto Peem instead, and nearly claims her life before Bulan steps in to break the spell. They return to Bulan's bedroom after the ordeal, and kiss. The next morning, Peem suspects that Bulan may have put her under a love spell.
3	"Episode 3"	21 September 2026
Peem seeks out alternative room rentals to no avail after leaving Bulan's house in haste. During dinner with Piak's family, she realises her growing feelings for Bulan and drops by her house intoxicated, but is rejected due to Bulan's aversion to alcohol. Against the police chief's request, Peem and Piak follow a lead on Krating to Mae Sot, and finds proof that he's in the area. Peem and Piak visit Bulan's sanctum for a ritual, and both women return to Bulan's room to have sex. Despite Bulan's warnings, Peem forges ahead with making the consecrated bullets.
4	"Episode 4"	28 September 2026
Bulan gives Peem a list of materials needed to forge the consecrated bullets. After meeting Inspector Chon at the Mae Sot Provincial Police Station to gather information on Krating's whereabouts, Peem sets out to find the materials from masters connected to Por Kru In, but faces challenges from supernatural forces. She acquires the remaining materials from Bulan, before they set out to Bulan's childhood home for the ritual. Peem learns about Bulan's journey to becoming a master, and they reaffirm their feelings for each other after. Bulan forges the bullets for Peem. Back at Phrop Phra, Krating lures Peem and Piak away from the police station to stage an attack on them. Bulan rushes to Peem after Thong warns her of the danger.
5	"Episode 5"	5 October 2026
Inspector Chon predicts that Krating's gang will attend the upcoming merit-making Krua Tan Procession in search for new victims. Bulan visits the temple for arrangements on her almshouse for the ceremony. At the same time, Krating lures Peem, Piak, and the Mae Sot police to an abandoned building. The Mae Sot unit is unwillingly controlled by Krating's enchantment to attack Peem and Piak. While Piak lures the unit away, Peem searches for Krating and uses the consecrated bullets to take him down, but fails due to his illusion spell. Suea, a steel shop owner is also enchanted to stop Bulan from leaving the temple. Bulan breaks the enchantment, and borrows the temple's sacred grounds for a ritual to interrupt Krating's spell. Peem accidentally injures Inspector Chon, and Krating escapes. Peem finally meets Thong. Later, Peem inquires about Bulan's tattoos, and they have sex. Meanwhile, Lom shows up at Bulan's house.
6	"Episode 6"	12 October 2026
An unknown entity taunts Bulan at her home. Peem meets Lom, Bulan's chief disciple, who is visiting Phrop Phra for the Krua Tan Procession. Bulan pays her mother a visit at the temple and enquires about her estranged older brother, wary about his appearance in her dreams. Peem and Piak are assigned to close the human trafficking case by the superintendent. Despite their deepening affection, Peem and Bulan struggle to verbally acknowledge their relationship status to each other. Peem and Piak attend the ceremony's night market to keep a lookout for Krating's gang. After a brief misunderstanding, Peem and Bulan make spiritual vows before the Buddha and affirm their love and devotion for each other. Faii, a friend of Praew's is revealed to be dating Krating, and doing his bidding by collecting items tied to Peem.
7	"Episode 7"	19 October 2026
The Phop Phra and Mae Sot police stations work together to find a missing Faii and capture Krating. The police ambush an abandoned building after Suea reveals its location, and finds the kidnapped girls. Peem subdues Krating with Bulan's help, but Faii is possessed by an unknown entity. They bring her to Bulan, who attempts a ritual to expel the entity, but is transported into a different realm in the process and meets the mastermind behind the human trafficking ring: her estranged older brother, Zai. Unbeknownst to them, Peem's family is hounded by dark spirits due to Zai's influence.
8	"Episode 8"	26 October 2026
Years ago, Por Kru In banishes his son Zai from their home due to his interest in the dark arts. In present day, the police pressures Krating to reveal the person behind the trafficking ring with the help of Seua, but both men die suddenly from a curse. Bulan confronts Zai at her home, and is almost overpowered before Peem arrives to rescue her. Bulan reveals to Peem that Zai had came for the family's powerful tiger spirit that she inherited from their father. Both women visit Bulan's mother, and Peem reaffirms her devotion to Bulan, but the latter is hesitant from what's about to come between them. Bulan returns to Bangkok with Peem to visit her family, but senses something amiss with Peem's mother.
9	"Episode 9"	2 November 2026
Madam Ratchapee displays hostile behaviour and distrust towards Bulan. Peem confronts her father Phakin on his infidelity and abuse towards her mother, during which Bulan performs an exorcism to dispel the black magic he'd been cursed with. They confront Madam Ratchapee, who demands that Bulan leave Peem. Bulan tearfully obliges, while Peem reluctantly agrees to let her mother prove she's under Bulan's love spell. After Peem visits her grandmother, Madam Ratchaphorn pays Bulan a visit disguised as a poor street hawker. Bulan teaches Phorn a few dishes to sell back home, and Phorn takes care of an ill, melancholic Bulan. They gradually grow closer.
10	"Episode 10"	9 November 2026
Two months later, Madam Ratchapee brings Peem to a charlatan who attempts to dispel dark magic from her through violent means. Madam Ratchapee finally accepts help to rid herself of Zai's influence. She returns to normal and accepts Bulan as Peem's lover. On the way back to Phop Phra, Peem gets into a suspicious car accident and is hospitalised. Bulan confronts Zai at their father's sanctum and is subdued. Phat's spirit finds Peem's spirit wandering in another realm and guides her back to her body after a tearful goodbye. Peem attempts to rescue Bulan, but is also subdued. Bulan agrees to transfer her sacred magic to Zai in exchange for Peem's life. He tries to kill them after obtaining Bulan's powers, but was defeated by a sacred object from their mother. Later, Phu wakes up and the Reuchakun family embrace happily, including Phat's spirit. Peem transfers to Phop Phra and starts a new life with Bulan.

== Marketing ==
A pilot was release on Star Hunter Entertainment's YouTube channel on 12 December 2025. A teaser was released on 20 August 2026, followed by the official trailer on 31 August. A grand opening premiere was held on 7 September at CentralWorld with the cast and crew in attendance, and the premiere hashtag trended at #1 in Thailand on the social media platform X. Subsequent episode's official hashtags trended on X weekly through encouragement by the series' official accounts, resulting in Episodes 3-7 trending at #1 on X in Thailand and worldwide. A special screening of Episode 5 with the cast was held on 5 October at the Siam Pavalai Royal Grand Theatre. Tickets to the screening were sold out within 30 minutes. 2,700 tickets to the finale screening event at MGI Hall, Bravo BKK were sold out in 15 minutes. An exhibition of the series' setting was held at Siam Center in conjunction with Halloween from 29 October - 1 November, where cast members attended to meet with fans from 29 - 31 October.

Year	Date	Fanmeet Event Name	Venue	Ref.
2026	7 September	Khom Khlang Grand Opening Premiere	SF World Cinema, CentralWorld	
2026	5 October	Khom Khlang EP5 Special	Siam Pavalai Royal Grand Theatre, Siam Paragon	
2026	9 November	Khom Khlang The Final Episode	MGI Hall, Bravo BKK	
2026	16 November	Khom Khlang Busking	MCC HALL, The Mall Lifestore Bangkapi	
2026	24 November	Khom Khlang The Series - Loy Krathong Festival	Miracle Land Mae Taeng, Chiangmai	

== Awards and nominations ==
Year	Award	Category	Nominee	Result
2026	Guadix Iridiscente Festival Internacional de Cine (GIFIC)	Miradas de Asia	Khom Khlang	Won

== Cultural references ==
The series heavily features Thai culture, mythology, and spiritual beliefs rooted in Thai occultism and Theravada Buddhism.

The character Bulan observes the five Buddhist precepts, and worships the Buddha and the sacred 'three-eyed' fire hermit Ruesi Ta Fai. She also pays respects to other deities such as Phra Mae Thorani, and cares for a kuman thong named Thong. She is also a sak yant master, and carries five tattoos with distinct meaning connected to real world yantra designs. Other characters such as Krating also carry yantra tattoos based on real designs. In her pursuit to bring Krating to justice, Peem approaches Bulan to create consecrated bullets out of seven mythical sacred materials, such as the popular lek lai (fabled iron) and parot pa (wild mercury).

Other cultural and mystic practices include merit making, love charms, exorcisms, black magic curses, the concept of reincarnation, khuu boon (karmic soulmates), and the concept of khwan (vital spirit).
