= Royal Doctor =

- Also known as: หมอหลวง
- Genre: Period; Romantic comedy; Medical drama
- Directed by: Chudapha Chanthakhet
- Starring: Mario Maurer; Kimberley Anne Woltemas; Masu Junyangdikul; Napapa Tantrakul
- No. of episodes: 22

Production
- Producers: Chudapha Chanthakhet; Piya Sawetpikul
- Production company: Sonix Boom 2013 company limited

Original release
- Network: Channel 3
- Release: March 21 – June 5, 2023

Royal Doctor (Thai: หมอหลวง) is a Thai television drama, period, romantic comedy from Sonix Boom 2013 company limited by the drama producer Chudapha Chanthakhet, which is also the director of this drama and Piya Sawetpikul, starring Mario Maurer as Thong-on, Kimberley Anne Woltemas as Bua, along with Masu Junyangdikul, Napapa Tantrakul, Charttayodom Hiranyatthiti, Jariya Anfone, Sueangsuda Lawanprasert. Which this drama is not a sequel to the drama Thong-Ek Mor Ya Tha Chalorng that aired in 2019

== Production ==
Costume fittings for the drama have already taken place. The production for Royal Doctor has finished filming, holding a sacrifice ceremony at Channel 3 Studio, Nong Khaem, followed by an official closing party in the evening.

== Cast ==
=== Main ===
- Mario Maurer (Oh) as Thong-on (Son of Luang Chamnanwet who was born to Phikun's mother)
- Kimberley Anne Woltemas (Kim) as Bua / Akrima
- Masu Junyangdikul (Masu) as Thongtae (The eldest son of Luang Chamnanwet who was born to Mae Thiap.)
- Mayurin Pongpudpunth (Kik) as Mae Phikun (Luang Chamnanwet's second wife and Thong-on's mother)
- Chatayodom Hiranyatithi (Chai) as Luang Chamnanwet (Thongkham) (Mor Luang, the father of Thong-on and Thongtae)
- Jariya Anfone (Nok) as Mae Thiap (First wife of Luang Chamnanwet and the mother of Thongtae)
- Tatsapon Wiwitawan (Peterpan) as Prince Phanphichakorn (Jao Phan)
- Sirilak Kwong (Lingling) as Khun Manwad (Man)

=== Supporting ===
- Nakhun Rojanai (Baan) as Yod (Thong-on's friend)
- Jakarin Puribhat (Gap) as Phum (Thong-on's friend)
- Visarut Hiranbuth (Pai) as Boon (Teacher Han's son)
- Panudet Watnasuchart (Duke) as Phraya Bamrerat (Doctor Luang, teacher of Luang Chamnanwet)
- Sueangsuda Lawanprasert (Namfon) as Mom Tuan (His Royal Highness's mother)
- Napapa Tantrakul (Patt) as Phad / Pat (Bua's current friend's name is Pat. During the reign of King Rama III, they were villagers whom Bua came to live with and made friends.)
- Joopjeep Chernyim (Joopjeep) as Niang (plays the role of Niang)
- Freudonidas Natthapong Chartpong (Freud) as Jerd / Sap (Thong-on's friend), Sap is a twin brother of Jerd
- Charlie Sricharoen as Na Tem
- Watcharachai Sunthornsiri (Ant) as Teacher Han (Boon's father) / Dr.Niwat (Akrim's teacher)
- Phusaya Naksawat (Ya) as Bao Phuak (Mother's closest maid)
- Unruean Rachot (Noi) as Jam Pha (Mai Phikul's closest maid)
- Konglar Kanchanahoti as Doctor Nob (Royal Physician in the Royal Court of Siam)
- Suphadej Wongwattanaphan as Doctor Prueang (Royal Physician in the Royal Court of Siam)
- Norapat Nakadumrongchai (Time) as Thong-in (Real gold's adopted son)
- Thanathip Pongsuphan as a novice (Samanera)
- Thepthana Palakawong Na Ayutthaya (Max) as Doctor Chid (Royal Physician in the Royal Court of Siam)
- Lerwith Sangsith (Aon) as Doctor Chan (Royal Physician in the Royal Court of Siam)
- Sornchai Chatwiriyachai (Sonny) as the blind doctor (Folk Healer)
- Murad Yapici as Doctor Bradley (American Protestant missionary to Siam)
- Kanidsorn Laiwrakoran (Got) as Doctor Sorn (Thong-on's friend)
- Thanadol Auepong (Parm) as Doctor Um (Thong-on's friend)
- Ratchapong Anomakiti (Poppy) as Doctor Suk (Thong-on's friend)
- Chenrach Sumonwat (Champ) as Doctor Kaew (Thong-on's friend)
- Pichayut Rungroadsub as Doctor Chom (Thong-on's friend)
- Pipatpong Sakdanarong as Doctor Dam (Thong-on's friend)
- Suphawit Jankiean as Doctor (Thong-on's friend)
- Supachai Panrattanapong (Pee) as Doctor (Thong-on's friend)
- Sangsan Santimaneerat (Chert) as Pon (Mom Tuan's close servant)

=== Guest appearances ===
- Penpetch Benyakul (Jab) as Sunthorn Phu (a royal poet began in the reign of King Rama II / Medication) (Ep. 11)
- Komsan Tinnakorn Na Ayutthaya as Doctor Kom (Royal Physician in the Royal Court of Siam) (Ep. 1–3, 5–6, 9–11, 13–16)
- Kenneth Won (Ken) as Doctor Prueang
- Gasab Jumpadib (Ong) as Doctor Thad (Folk Healer) (Ep. 1, 12–14)
- Jaran Ngamdee (Num) as Chao Phraya Surawongwaiyawat (Worn Bunnag) (Minister of Defence of Siam) (Ep. 4, 7–8)
- Pongsanart Vinsiri (Too) as HRH Doctor (Ep. 15)
