= Naiin =

Thai bookstore chain

- Trade name: Amarin Book Center
- Native name: ร้านนายอินทร์
- Company type: Subsidiary
- Industry: Retail; Bookselling
- Founded: 1993; 33 years ago
- Founder: Chukiat Utakapan
- Headquarters: Nonthaburi, Thailand
- Number of locations: 116 stores (2024)
- Area served: Thailand
- Products: Books; Magazine
- Parent: Amarin Group
- Website: https://naiin.com

Naiin (Thai: ร้านนายอินทร์) is a Thai bookstore chain operated by Amarin Book Center, a subsidiary of the Amarin Group. The subsidiary was founded in 1993 by Chukiat Utakapan and initially focused on distributing publications from freelance writers, external publishers, and its parent company. In 1994, it entered the retail market with the opening of its first physical store at Tha Phra Chan in Bangkok. By 2012, Naiin was described by the Bangkok Post as one of the country's two largest bookstore chains.

On March 31, 2022, the original Tha Phra Chan branch permanently closed after 28 years. As of 2024, the chain operates approximately 116 stores in Thailand, down from 145 in 2018.
