= Time Zone (Thai TV series) =

- Official pilot poster
- เขตรักอันตราย
- Genre: Boys' love; Romantic comedy; Drama; Coming-of-age
- Directed by: Phuwadol Naosopa
- Starring: Pipit Wutthiwat; Amus Piopoom; Kaweewat Samapongwiwat; Somphop Amatmuntree; Thapanak Limpisutthipong; Suriya Phakdisiriwong; Prameen Naromram; Natsaset Dankaeo; Chonsit Boonsiriwatcharakul; Pisit Nimitsamanjit; Techin Ploypetch; Tonhorm Sakuntala
- Country of origin: Thailand
- Original language: Thai
- No. of seasons: 1
- No. of episodes: 10

Original release
- Network: iQIYI

Time Zone, also known by its Thai title Khet Rak Antarai (เขตรักอันตราย), is an upcoming Thai boys' love romantic comedy, drama and coming-of-age television series produced by Star Hunter Entertainment and directed by Phuwadol Naosopa. The series stars Pipit Wutthiwat and Amus Piopoom in the lead roles.

The series is scheduled to premiere in 2026 on iQIYI. The first official pilot, released during the STAR HUNTER 2025 event, had surpassed 440,000 views by July 2026.

== Synopsis ==
Time is a second-year high school student known for his rebellious behavior and constant disregard for school rules. After being caught skipping class by Zone, the disciplined president of the student council, he is sent to the principal's office. The incident sparks Time's desire to get revenge on his classmate. However, unexpected circumstances gradually bring the two closer together. While Zone devotes himself to maintaining order and strictly following the rules, Time lives to break them. As they are forced to spend more time together, both begin to see each other differently, transforming their initial rivalry into a relationship marked by self-discovery, personal growth and feelings that challenge every rule of the school.

== Cast ==
=== Main ===
- Pipit Wutthiwat as Time
- Amus Piopoom as Zone
- Kaweewat Samapongwiwat
- Somphop Amatmuntree

=== Supporting ===
- Thapanak Limpisutthipong
- Suriya Phakdisiriwong
- Prameen Naromram
- Natsaset Dankaeo
- Chonsit Boonsiriwatcharakul
- Pisit Nimitsamanjit
- Techin Ploypetch as the school principal
- DJ Tonhorm as the disciplinary teacher

== Production ==
The series was officially announced during the Star Hunter Project Line Up 2025 event, held in Bangkok in November 2024. Alongside the announcement, a three-minute-and-nine-second pilot trailer was released.

In December 2025, Star Hunter held the Star Hunter Project Line Up 2026 event, reintroducing the series with a new promotional video featuring the updated cast.

In July 2026, Star Hunter held the blessing ceremony and officially began filming at Canvas Studio by Charcoal Design in Bangkok. The event was attended by the company's president Yot Kornhiran, executive director Chanan Lapanantrong, director Phuwadol Naosopa, and representatives from iQIYI Thailand.

The adaptation is based on a novel whose rights were acquired by Star Hunter approximately three years before production began. According to Naosopa, development of the project was postponed until the production team found actors they considered ideal for portraying the two lead characters.
