= Panuwat Sopradit =

Thai actor

- ภาณุวัฒน์ โสประดิษฐ
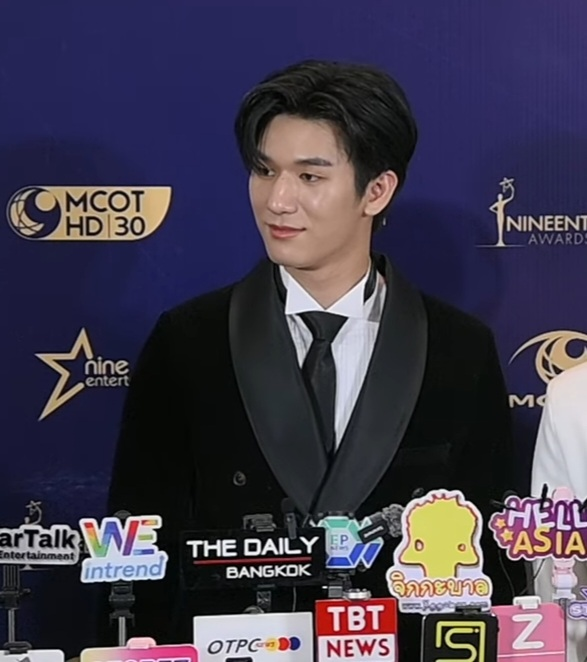
- Born: August 29, 2001 (age 25); Loei Province, Thailand
- Other names: Mos, Moslhong
- Education: Bangkok University (B.A. in Broadcasting and Streaming Media Production)
- Occupations: Actor, model
- Years active: 2022–present
- Agent(s): Star Hunter Entertainment (2022–2025) iQIYI (2025–present)

Panuwat Sopradit (Thai: ภาณุวัฒน์ โสประดิษฐ; born 29 August 2001), nicknamed Mos (Thai: มอส), is a Thai actor and model. He is best known for portraying Mangkorn Akira Chitsanupongkul in Big Dragon (2022) and Sun Suriyen in Sunset x Vibes (2024). In 2026, he stars in the series Identity Zero on iQIYI.

== Early life and education ==
Panuwat Sopradit was born on 29 August 2001 in Loei Province, Thailand. He later moved to Bangkok to pursue his studies and attended Bangkok University, where he studied Broadcasting and Streaming Media Production. He graduated with a bachelor's degree in 2024.

== Career ==
In 2022, Sopradit signed with Star Hunter Entertainment and made his acting debut in the boys' love television series Big Dragon, starring opposite Mondop Heamtan. He portrayed Mangkorn Akira Chitsanupongkul, one of the series' lead characters.

In 2023, he starred as Joong in Club Friday Season 15: Rak Ni Mai Mee Luem and appeared in the anthology series Y Journey. That same year, Star Hunter Entertainment announced that Sopradit and Heamtan would reunite as the lead couple in Sunset x Vibes, while plans for a Big Dragon film adaptation were also revealed.

In 2024, Sopradit starred as Sun Suriyen in the romantic drama series Sunset x Vibes, again opposite Mondop Heamtan.

In November 2025, Sopradit and longtime co-star Mondop Heamtan joined iQIYI following the expiration of their contracts with Star Hunter Entertainment. In 2026, he was cast as Phanuthir in the fantasy drama series Identity Zero, one of iQIYI Thailand's original productions.

== Filmography ==
=== Film ===
Year	Title	Role	Notes
2025	Ta Khon	Joy	Leading role
TBA	Big Dragon: The Movie	Mangkorn Akira Chitsanupongkul	Leading role

=== Television ===
Year	Title	Role	Notes	Network
2022	Big Dragon	Mangkorn Akira Chitsanupongkul	Leading role	One 31 / iQIYI
2023	Club Friday Season 15: Rak Ni Mai Mee Luem	Joong	Leading role	One 31
2023	Y Journey	—	Lead role (Let's Say a Lover)	—
2024	Sunset x Vibes	Sun Suriyen	Leading role	One 31 / iQIYI
2024	First Note of Love	Himself	Guest role (Episodes 4, 8)	GagaOOLala
2025	My Dream Is Fencing	Time	Leading role	Thai PBS
2026	Identity Zero	Phanuthir	Leading role	iQIYI
2026	Dangerous Rose	Somchai	Indonesian series	iQIYI
TBA	Be My (Soul)mate	Mi	Leading role	—
TBA	True Moon	Mangkorn	Supporting role	—

== Discography ==
=== Singles ===
Year	Release date	Title	Artist(s)	Notes	Ref.
2023	9 January	Between Us	ISBANKY feat. Moslhong	—	
2024	1 January	Always Dreaming of You	Moslhong	First Mandarin single	—
2024	6 February	Heart Sticker	Moslhong feat. Wonderframe	—	
2024	30 April	Heartbeat Connection	Moslhong & ISBANKY	Mandarin single	—
2024	31 July	Can't Stop Me Loving You	The Dragon	Group single	

=== Soundtrack appearances ===
Year	Release date	Title	Artist(s)	Project	Ref.
2022	21 September	Dancing With The Devil	ISBANKY	Big Dragon OST	
2022	8 November	Just Smile (ได้แค่ยิ้ม)	ISBANKY	Big Dragon OST	

=== Cover songs ===
Year	Release date	Title	Original artist	Performer(s)	Ref.
2025	30 January	Far Away (千里之外)	Jay Chou	The Dragon	

== Fan meetings ==
Year	Date	Fan meeting	Country / Region	Venue	Ref.
2022	26 November	Big Dragon Final EP. Fan Meeting	Thailand	ICON CINECONIC, ICONSIAM	
2023	12 February	Mos Bank Valentine Party in Seoul	South Korea	M5 Studio	—
2023	10 March	Big Dragon 1st Fan Meeting	Taiwan	Legacy Taipei	
2023	25 March	Mos Bank "The First Precious Love" Fan Meeting in Paris	France	Théâtre Marie Bell	
2023	29 July	Mos Bank Summer Hot Love 1st Fan Meeting in Macau	Macau	Lisboeta Macau H853 Entertainment Place	—
2023	2 December	Mos Bank JIB Dream Fan Meeting in Italy	Italy	Hilton Rome Airport Hotel	
2023	23 December	Mos Bank Mistletoe Magic Online Fan Meeting	Worldwide	Online	—
2024	27 January	The Dragon Fan Meeting	Brazil	Terra SP	—
2024	6 April	The Dragon Fan Meeting	Mexico	Auditorio BB	
2024	30 August	Moslhong Birthday Party	Thailand	Union Co-Event Studio	—
2024	31 August	Sunset x Vibes Final EP. Fan Meeting	Thailand	Earthlab Cinema by Dr. CBD	—
2024	2 October	Moslhong Fan Meeting in China	China	Nanning	—
2024	1 December	Mos Bank & The Dragon 1st Fan Meeting in Taipei	Taiwan	Corner Max	—
2025	24 January	Mos Bank 1st Fan Meeting in Brazil	Brazil	Carioca Club	—
2025	25 January	Mos Bank Pocket Show	Brazil	Expo MinAsia Te Leva	—
2025	26 January	Mos Bank Fan Sign	Brazil	Expo MinAsia Te Leva	—
2025	17 May	Mos Bank 1st Fan Meeting	Singapore	Foochow Building	—
2025	24 May	Mos Bank 1st Fan Meeting	Indonesia	Ciputra Artpreneur	—
2025	1 November	Mos Bank 1st Fan Sign in Chongqing	China	Chongqing	—

== Live performances ==
Year	Date	Event	Country / Region	Venue	Ref.
2024	22 September	NineEntertain Birthday Festival 2024	Thailand	Siam Paragon	
