= Big Dragon =

2022 Thai television series

- มังกรกินใหญ่
- Genre: Comedy; Drama; Romance; Boys' love
- Written by: Puwadon Naosopa; Mitpracha Outtaros
- Directed by: Puwadon Naosopa
- Starring: Panuwat Sopradit; Mondop Heamtan
- Composer: Jeff Satur
- Country of origin: Thailand
- Original language: Thai
- No. of seasons: 1
- No. of episodes: 8

Production
- Cinematography: Ratchanon Kaeosaart
- Running time: 50 minutes
- Production company: Star Hunter Entertainment

Original release
- Network: One31; iQIYI
- Release: 8 October – 26 November 2022

Big Dragon (Thai: มังกรกินใหญ่) is a 2022 Thai boys' love romantic drama television series starring Panuwat Sopradit (Mos) and Mondop Heamtan (Bank).

Directed by Puwadon Naosopa and produced by Star Hunter Entertainment, the series premiered on One31 on 8 October 2022 and concluded on 26 November 2022 after eight episodes. The series was also made available for international streaming through iQIYI and Viki.

== Synopsis ==
Yai (Mondop Heamtan) and Mangkorn (Panuwat Sopradit) are romantic rivals. One night, at Yai's newly inherited pub, the two end up drinking together. Yai plans to take revenge on Mangkorn, but his scheme backfires and the pair spend the night together. The following day, Yai becomes frustrated when Mangkorn reveals that he possesses evidence of their encounter. Hoping to move on, Yai focuses on renovating his pub, only to discover that Mangkorn is part of the design team assigned to the project.

== Cast ==
=== Main ===
- Panuwat Sopradit as Akira Chitsanupongkul (Mangkorn)
- Mondop Heamtan as Alangkan Singhawatthanachok (Yai)

=== Supporting ===
- Bovorn Kongnawdee as Park
- Rathasat Butwong as Phong
- Mathurada Tuilampang as Hong
- Thanakorn Kuljarassombat as Nine
- Wayne Falconer as Barom Singhawatthanachok
- Naruemon Phongsupap
- Iverinr Chuenchob as Ajo
- Kasama Kranjanawattana as George
- Jetsadakorn Bundit
- Kad Ploysupa as Tao

== Soundtrack ==
Year	Release date	Title	Artist	Ref.
2022	21 September	Dancing With The Devil	ISBANKY	
2022	8 November	ได้แค่ยิ้ม (Just Smile)	ISBANKY	

== Live performances ==
=== Fan meetings ===
Year	Date	Event	Country / Region	Venue	Ref.
2022	26 November	Big Dragon Final Ep. Fan Meeting	Thailand	ICON CINECONIC, ICONSIAM	
