= Mookda Narinrak =

Thai actress

- มุกดา นรินทร์รักษ์
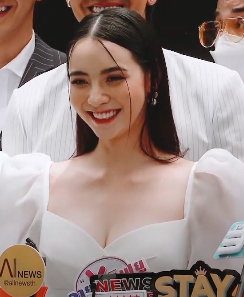
- Mookda in 2022
- Born: Mookda Narinrak; July 26, 1996 (age 29); Ranong, Thailand
- Other name: Mook (มุก)
- Occupations: Actress; model; MC; YouTubers
- Years active: 2016–present
- Agent(s): Channel 7 (2016–2024); The One Enterprise (2025–present)
- Notable work: Mussaya; So Wayree
- Height: 1.65 m (5 ft 5 in)

Mookda Narinrak (มุกดา นรินทร์รักษ์; born 1996) or known as Mook (มุก) is an actress, model, and dancer in Thailand. She is mostly known for her roles in Mussaya (2017), Suparburuth Jom Jorn (2019), So Wayree (2020), and Ku Kaen Saen Ruk (2021). She is the winner of Miss Teen Thailand 2011.

== Early life ==
Mookda was born on 26 July 1996 in Ranong province, Thailand. She went to Pichai Ratana Carmi Secondary School for her high school education. She also attended University of the Thai Chamber of Commerce (UTCC) majoring in Communication Arts.

== Career ==
She competed in Miss Teen Thailand in 2011 and she was the winner for that year. She also participated in another show that is To Be Number One Idol 2012 Contest and won for dance team category. Other than that she also working as a model for Japan Magazine Ray from 2013 to 2014, where she worked both in Bangkok and Tokyo as a professional runway model. In 2016, she signed a contract with Channel 7 to become one of the actresses. Her debut drama was in Kamin Gub Poon, where she is paired with Bank Arthit Tangwiboonpanit. She transitioned into a freelance actor after the contract ended with Channel 7 in 2024.

== Filmography ==
=== Film ===
Year	Title	Role	Note
2021	My Boss is a Serial Killer	Maesa	
2023	Slyth: The Hunt Saga	Z	
2025	Wooden Buddha	Kampaeng	

=== Television series ===
Year	Title	Role	Network	Notes
2016	Kamin Gub Poon	Paramee	Channel 7	
2016	Tai Rom Pra Baramee: Jahk Fahk Fah Suralai	Som	Channel 7	
2017	A Ma Apartment	Mei Li	Channel 7	
2017	Mussaya	Mussaya Rattanamahasarn	Channel 7	
2018	Panthakan Ruk	Prapai	Channel 7	
2018	Nang Thip	Parita Chotwaree	Channel 7	
2019	Suparburoot Jorm Jon: Maturot Lohgan	M.L. Petch Nampeung	Channel 7	
2020	Marn Bang Jai	Fuenglada	Channel 7	
2020	So Wayree	Paramita Issaret	Channel 7	
2021	Ku Kaen Saen Ruk	Ingdao Naowarat / Daopradub Tubjakrawan	Channel 7	
2022	Koei Baan Rai Sapai Hi-So	Somesopha	Channel 7	
2022	Buang Wimala	Paramita Issaret	Channel 7	Cameo
2022	Petra Narumit	Khemiorn Apiraktharakon (Cream) / Mae Orn	Channel 7	
2024	Fai Nam Kang	Plubpla	Channel 7	
2025	The Thirsty Thirty	Busaba	Disney+	
2025	Decalcomania	Lea Wu / Nuengdiao Ananthikhun	One31	

=== Music video appearances ===
Year	Song title	Artist	Ref.
2017	"Kae Kon Tee Aep Ruk" (แค่คนที่แอบรัก)	Season Five feat. Noinae	
2020	"Shouldn't Ask" (คำถามจากคนเก่า)	Tanont Chumroen	

=== Hosting ===
Television

- 20 : ทุกวัน เวลา น.-น. ทางช่อง () ร่วมกับ

Online

- 2018 : Ep.1 ฮาน่า มุกดา พลอย On Air YouTube:PHM Channel ร่วมกับ Hana Lewis, Randapa Muntalumpa

== Awards and nominations ==
Name of the award ceremony, year presented, category, nominee of the award, and the result of the nomination
Award ceremony	Year	Category	Nominee / Work	Result	Ref.
ChobAPP Awards	2022	The Most Popular Couple (with Hussawee Pakrapongpisan)	So Wayree	Won	
Content Asia Awards	2021	Best Female Lead in a TV Programme	So Wayree	Nominated	
D Online Awards	2021	Favorite Female Lead	So Wayree	Nominated	
D Online Awards	2021	Favorite Couple (with Hussawee Pakrapongpisan)	So Wayree	Nominated	
Dara Inside Awards	2019	Best New Actress	Suparburoot Jorm Jon: Maturot Lohgan	Won	
Fever Awards	2018	Fever Female Rising Star	Mussaya	Won	
Japan Expo Thailand Awards	2022	Japan Expo Best Actress	Mookda Narinrak	Won	
Kazz Awards	2018	Best Couple (with Mik Thongraya)	Mussaya	Nominated	
Kazz Awards	2019	Top Girl of the Year	Mookda Narinrak	Won	
Kazz Awards	2020	Rising Actress of the Year	Suparburoot Jorm Jon: Maturot Lohgan	Nominated	
Kazz Awards	2020	The Best Scene (with Pattaradet Sa-nguankwamdee)	Suparburoot Jorm Jon: Maturot Lohgan	Nominated	
Kazz Awards	2020	Top Girl of the Year	Mookda Narinrak	Won	
Kazz Awards	2020	Popular Vote	Mookda Narinrak	Nominated	
Kazz Awards	2021	Top Actress Award	So Wayree	Nominated	
Kazz Awards	2021	Popular Couple of the Year (with Hussawee Pakrapongpisan)	So Wayree	Nominated	
Kazz Awards	2021	Top Girl of the Year	Mookda Narinrak	Won	
Kom Chad Luek Awards	2021	Popular Vote – Actress	So Wayree	Nominated	
Kom Chad Luek Awards	2022	Popular Vote – Actress	Ku Kaen Saen Ruk	Nominated	
Maya Awards	2018	Favorite Female Rising Star – TV	Mussaya	Nominated	
Maya Awards	2020	Best Female Rising Star – TV	So Wayree	Won	
Maya Awards	2020	Favorite Female Rising Star – TV	Suparburoot Jorm Jon: Maturot Lohgan	Nominated	
Maya Awards	2021	Favorite Leading Actress – TV	So Wayree	Won	
Maya Awards	2021	Favorite Couple (with Hussawee Pakrapongpisan)	So Wayree	Nominated	
Maya Awards	2021	Charming Girl	Mookda Narinrak	Nominated	
Maya Awards	2024	Best Leading Actress	Petra Narumit	Won	
Maya Entertain Awards	2022	Charming Girl	Mookda Narinrak	Nominated	
Miss Teen Thailand	2011	Miss Teen Thailand – Winner	Mookda Narinrak	Won	
Nataraj Awards	2018	Breakthrough Actress	Mussaya	Nominated	
Siam Series Awards	2021	Best Actress in a Leading Role	So Wayree	Nominated	
Siam Series Awards	2021	Best Couple (with Hussawee Pakrapongpisan)	So Wayree	Nominated	
Siam Series Awards	2021	Favorite Couple (with Pattaradet Sa-nguankwamdee)	Ku Kaen Saen Ruk	Won	
Zoomdara Awards	2019	Zoom Female Rising Star	Suparburoot Jorm Jon: Maturot Lohgan	Won	
