= Amarin Group =

Thai media company

Amarin Corporations Public Company Limited
- Type: Public
- ISIN: TH0277010Z04
- Industry: Book publishing; Magazines; Retail; Media
- Founded: 1976; 50 years ago
- Headquarters: Thailand
- Parent: Vadhanabhakdi Co., Ltd.

Amarin Corporations Public Company Limited, known as Amarin Printing and Publishing until 2023 and branded as Amarin Group, is a Thai media company. It began doing business in 1976 with the Baan Lae Suan home and lifestyle magazine and grew to become a major publisher of books and glossy magazines, including titles such as Room, Praew, Cheewajit, and National Geographic Thailand. It also has operations in book retail through the Naiin bookstore chain and branched into television with Amarin TV in 2012. The company was listed on the Stock Exchange of Thailand in 1993 but has been experiencing financial difficulties since the 2010s due to the changing media landscape. The Sirivadhanabhakdi family's Vadhanabhakdi Co., Ltd. bought into the company in 2016, and is now the majority shareholder at 60.35%.
