= Masu Junyangdikul =

Thai actor

- มาสุ จรรยางค์ดีกุล
- Born: Masu Junyangdikul; June 9, 1994 (age 31); Bangkok, Thailand
- Other name: Masu
- Education: Bangkok University (Faculty of Communication Arts)
- Occupations: Actor; DJ
- Years active: 2011–present
- Agent: Channel 3 (2015–present)
- Height: 1.82 m (5 ft 11 1/2 in)

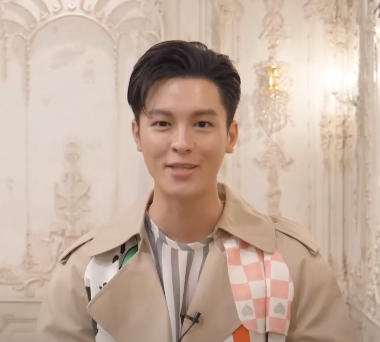

Masu Junyangdikul (Thai: มาสุ จรรยางค์ดีกุล; born June 9, 1994), nickname Masu (Thai: มาสุ), is a Thai actor and DJ.

== Early life and education ==
Masu was born on June 9, 1994, in Bangkok, Thailand.

Masu graduated junior high school from Roong Aroon School and upper secondary level from Wat Suthiwararam School. He continued to study the undergraduate level at the Faculty of Communication Arts, Bangkok University.

== Career ==
Masu began to enter the entertainment industry for the first time by becoming a DJ in Pynk98 wave with DJ Matoom and show sitcom Clear Siwaypink, playing as Marvin on Channel 5.

After that, in 2014, Masu signed an actor contract with Channel 3.

In 2015, his first work was the Mafia Luerd Mungkorn Series, in which he played the role of Zhou Kae-sung (young). Later, he starred in Kor Pen Jaosao Suk Krung Hai Cheun Jai. He also starred in the drama Bu Ram Pram Pra, which is his first lead role.

== Filmography ==
=== Television series ===
Year	Title	Role	Notes	Network
2015	Luerd Mungkorn: Krating	Zhou Kae-sung (young)	Supporting role	Channel 3
2015	Luerd Mungkorn: Raed	Zhou Kae-sung (young)	Cameo	Channel 3
2015	Luerd Mungkorn: Hong	Zhou Kae-sung (young)	Supporting role	Channel 3
2015	Kor Pen Jaosao Suk Krung Hai Cheun Jai	Leuk Lap	Supporting role	Channel 3
2015	Bu Ram Pram Pra	Saensamut Samutgavin	Main role	Channel 3
2017	Roi Pa Wai Duay Rak	Major Saenkom Ariyawat / "Saen"	Main role	Channel 3
2017	Khluen Chiwit	Jade	Supporting role	Channel 3
2018	Chuamong Tong Mon	Phutimeth Kittipaisarnsakun (Meth)	Main role	Channel 3
2019	Lub Luang Jai	Jarinthorn / "Joe"	Main role	Channel 3
2019	My Love From Another Star (Thai ver.)	Mork	Supporting role	Channel 3
2019	Dao Lhong Fah	Dom	Main role	Channel 3
2020	Pom Arthun	Kawin	Main role	Channel 3
2021	Ubaat Rai Ubaat Ruk	"Mong" Thitphati Techpipat	Main role	Channel 3
2023	Royal Doctor / Mor Luang	Thongtae	Supporting role	Channel 3
2023	Male Prostitute / Chai Paetsaya	Tatcha	Supporting role	Channel 3
2025	Twisted Destinies	Chanon	Main role	Channel 3
2026	Love Like a Bike	Nubnueng	Main role	Channel 3

=== Sitcom ===
Year	Title	Role	Network
2011	Clear Siwaypink (คลื่นใสวัยปิ๊งค์)	Marvin	Channel 5

== Award ==
Year	Awards	Category	Nominated work	Result
2015	TV Three Fans Award	Most Popular Male Star	Bu Ram Pram Pra	Won
