= Love Senior The Series =

2023 Thai television series

- Also known as: พี่ว้ากคะรักหนูได้มั้ย
- Genre: Girls' love; Romantic drama
- Directed by: Ying Manassanun Su
- Starring: Anda Anunta Teavirat; Lookkaew Kamollak Sangsubsin; Noon Thunyaphat Inyawilert; Praewa Putticha Boonyamas; Pin Danita Choktadaporn; Atom Aphichaya Kamnoetsirikun; Pam Parima Peamkaroonrath; Som Supatsorn Suriyakul; Bua Buachumpoo Homdork; Jenny Pataravadee Thitivoodtikul
- Country of origin: Thailand
- Original language: Thai
- No. of seasons: 1
- No. of episodes: 10

Production
- Running time: 51 minutes

Original release
- Release: November 8, 2023 – January 10, 2024

Love Senior (Thai: พี่ว้ากคะรักหนูได้มั้ย RTGS: phiwakkharaknudaimai; lit. 'Hey senior, can you love me?') is a Thai girls' love television series directed by Ying Manassanun Su and starring Anda Anunta Teavirat and Lookkaew Kamollak Sangsubsin in the lead roles. The series premiered on 8 November 2023 on GMM 25 and was simultaneously made available on WeTV. It was later added to the iQIYI catalog. In November 2024, the series received a five-episode sequel titled Love Senior Special, which aired on Amarin TV and WeTV.

== Synopsis ==
Gyoza, a second-year electrical engineering student, is the senior student responsible for welcoming incoming freshmen. During the university initiation, freshman Manaow must obtain Gyoza's signature to complete one of her tasks. Although she expects to meet a strict senior, Manaow discovers that Gyoza has a kind personality. Instead of giving her signature immediately, Gyoza asks Manaow and her friend Ali to take part in an electrical engineering department competition. As they spend more time together, their relationship gradually develops beyond friendship.

== Cast ==
- Anda Anunta Teavirat as Manaow
- Lookkaew Kamollak Sangsubsin as Gyoza
- Noon Thunyaphat Inyawilert as Warang
- Praewa Putticha Boonyamas as Prang
- Pin Danita Choktadaporn as Jupjip
- Atom Aphichaya Kamnoetsirikun as Luktan
- Pam Parima Peamkaroonrath as Thida
- Som Supatsorn Suriyakul as Oei
- Bua Buachumpoo Homdork as Grazia
- Jenny Pataravadee Thitivoodtikul as Lada
- Sceneho as Suay
- Devi Deviyabha Uddhachandra as Poy
- Mersedes Siripath Sarakune as Belle
- Tora Toranin Manosudprasit as Mafueang, Manaow's older brother
- Bonus Tanadech Deeseesuk as Pure
- Jame Kasama Kranjanawattana as Ali
- Ohm Phatcharaphol Nimnual as Jaojom
- Pufresh as Ikkiw
- Mawin Tanawin Duangnate as Sutrit
- Mo Amena Pinit as Warit (Love Senior Special)
- Newton Waiyakorn Wongkhakaew as Kirin (Love Senior Special)

=== Guest appearance ===
- Nattapol Diloknawarit (Max) as Max (episode 3)

== Love Senior Special ==
Love Senior Special (พี่ว้ากคะ รักหนูได้มั้ย!? ตอนพิเศษ) is a five-episode sequel to Love Senior, which aired from 30 November to 28 December 2024 on Amarin TV HD 34 and WeTV.

The story follows Manaow, Gyoza, Warang, and Prang after their university years as they face new challenges in their personal and professional lives.

=== Cast ===
- Anda Anunta Teavirat as Manaow
- Lookkaew Kamollak Sangsubsin as Gyoza
- Mo Amena Pinit as Warit
- Noon Thunyaphat Inyawilert as Warang
- Praewa Putticha Boonyamas as Prang
- Mersedes Siripath Sarakune as Belle
- Atom Aphichaya Kamnoetsirikun as Luktan
- Waiyakorn Wongkhakaew (Newton) as Kirin
- Jenny Pataravadee Thitivoodtikul as Lada
- Pam Parima Peamkaroonrath as Thida
- Pin Danita Choktadaporn as Jupjip
- Sceneho as Suay
- Som Supatsorn Suriyakul as Oei
- Devi Deviyabha Uddhachandra as Poy

== Soundtrack ==
Title	Artist	Length
"ชอบใช่มะ! (YOU GET LUCKY)"	COSMOS	4:23
