= Hussawee Pakrapongpisan =

Thai actor (born 1997)

- หัสวีร์ ภัคพงษ์ไพศาล
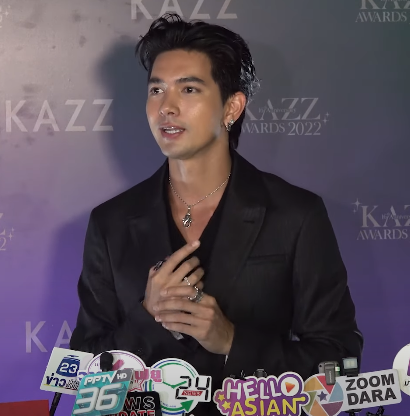
- Kem in 2022
- Born: 21 August 1997 (age 29); Nong Khai (present-day Bueng Kan), Thailand
- Other name: Kem (เข้ม)
- Education: Dhurakij Pundit University
- Occupation: Actor
- Years active: 2016–present
- Agent(s): Channel 7 (2017–2025); The One Enterprise (2025-present)
- Notable work: Jao Saming; Hua Jai Look Poochai; Tawan Arb Dao; So Wayree
- Height: 187 cm (6 ft 1 1/2 in)
- Website: Official website

Hussawee Pakrapongpisan (Thai: หัสวีร์ ภัคพงษ์ไพศาล; born 21 August 1997) nicknamed Kem (เข้ม) is a Thai actor. He is currently signed under The One Enterprise. He is best known for his roles in television dramas such as Jao Saming (2018), Hua Jai Look Poochai (2019), Tawan Arb Dao (2020), and So Wayree (2020).

== Early life ==
Kem was born on August 21, 1997, in Nong Khai (present-day Bueng Kan). He graduated from high school in Bueng Kan and on January 21, 2023, he graduated and earned a bachelor's degree in the Faculty of Communication Arts at Dhurakij Pundit University.

== Career ==
Kem started his career in the entertainment industry as a model. In 2017, he makes his debuted as an actor and signed an exclusive contract with Channel 7. His first lead role was in Hi-So Sa Orn, an evening drama in 2018. In that same year, his first prime-time drama was Jao Saming. In 2020, Kem popularity grow even bigger after paired with Mookda Narinrak in a drama So Wayree.

== Filmography ==
=== Film ===
Year	Title	Role
2020	Rak Na, Soup Soup	Hunsas
2021	Love the Wrong Person	Tin
2022	Why We Love	Min

=== Dramas ===
Year	Title	Role	Notes	Channel
2016	Patihan		Support Role	PPTV HD
2018	Hi-So Sa Orn	Aidin	Main Role	Channel 7
2018	Jao Saming	Ongtee / Tawan	Main Role	Channel 7
2019	Hua Jai Look Poochai	Nop	Main Role	Channel 7
2019	Dtagrut Ton	Sayumphu / phu	Main Role	Channel 7
2020	Tawan Arb Dao	Siwath	Main Role	Channel 7
2020	So Wayree	Parin / "Prince"	Main Role	Channel 7
2021	Phao Khon	Amphon	Main Role	Channel 7
2022	Koei Baan Rai Sapai Hi-So	"Nin" / Chaninthorn	Main Role	Channel 7
2022	Buang Wimala	Parin / "Prince"	Guest Role	Channel 7
2022	Chart Payak Khom Nak Laeng	Chart	Main Role	Channel 7
TBA	Lhom Pud Parn Dao	Wayu	Main Role	Channel 7
TBA	Muang Kaew	Naksit	Main Role	Channel 7

=== Music video appearances ===
Year	Song title	Artist	Ref.
2014	"กระเป๋าสมปอง"	จ่อย ไมค์ทองคำ	
2016	"ฝันว่ามีแฟน"	นัท มาลิสา	
2017	"ภาวนา (Pray)"	Coconut Sunday	
2020	"คำถามจากคนเก่า (Shouldn't Ask)"	Tanont Chumroen	
2021	"รักคนผิด"	Labanoon	

== Awards and nominations ==
Year	Awards	Category	Nominated work	Result
2019	MAYA AWARDS 2019	Male Rising Star, People's Choice Award	Jao Saming	Won
2020	MAYA AWARDS 2020	Charming Young Man, People's Choice Award	—N/a	Nominated
2020	MAYA AWARDS 2020	Rising Star Actor Award, People's Choice Award	Dtagrut Ton	Nominated
2020	MAYA AWARDS 2020	Best Healthy Star	—N/a	Won
2020	Poldara Thairath	Rising Star	So Wayree	Won
2020	The 17th Kom Chad Luek Award	Popular Actor	So Wayree	Nominated
2020	FEVER Awards 2020	Lead Actor Fever	So Wayree	Won
2020	FEVER Awards 2020	Super Fever Awards	So Wayree	Won
2021	D Online Awards 2021	Favorite Couple (with Mookda Narinrak)	So Wayree	Nominated
2021	D Online Awards 2021	Popular Lead Actor	So Wayree	Won
2021	KAZZ Award 2021	Young Bang of the Year	So Wayree	Won
2021	KAZZ Award 2021	Hot young man of the year	So Wayree	Nominated
2021	KAZZ Award 2021	The best couple of the year (with Mookda Narinrak)	So Wayree	Nominated
2021	SIAM SERIES AWARDS 2021	Best Actor	So Wayree	Nominated
2021	SIAM SERIES AWARDS 2021	Best Couple (with Mookda Narinrak)	So Wayree	Nominated
2021	MAYA AWARDS 2021	Popular Male Lead Actor	So Wayree	Won
2021	MAYA AWARDS 2021	Favorite Couple (with Mookda Narinrak)	So Wayree	Nominated
2021	MAYA AWARDS 2021	A charming young man who is loved by the public	So Wayree	Nominated
2023	ChobAPP Awards 2022	The Most Popular Couple (with Mookda Narinrak)		Won
