= Sunset x Vibes =

2024 Thai television series

- เพียงชลาลัย
- Genre: Boys' love; Romantic drama
- Starring: Mos Panuwat Sopradit; Bank Mondop Heamtan; Fong Bovorn Kongnawdee; JJ Rathasat Butwong; Anda Anunta Teavirat; Lookkaew Kamollak Sangsubsin; Tenon Teachapat Pinrat; Pete Wacharanon Seeduan; Koy Naruemon Phongsupap
- Country of origin: Thailand
- Original language: Thai
- No. of seasons: 1
- No. of episodes: 12

Production
- Running time: 50 minutes
- Production company: Star Hunter Entertainment

Original release
- Network: One 31; iQIYI
- Release: June 15 – August 31, 2024

Sunset x Vibes (Thai: เพียงชลาลัย; RTGS: Phiang Chonlalai) is a Thai Boys' love television series produced by Star Hunter Entertainment. Based on the novel of the same name by Rosesarin, it stars Panuwat Sopradit (Mos) and Mondop Heamtan (Bank) in the lead roles.

The series premiered on One 31 on 15 June 2024 and was released simultaneously on iQIYI. A special episode was released exclusively on iQIYI on 13 September 2024.

== Synopsis ==
Since childhood, Salin has dreamed of a man dressed in traditional Thai clothing on every full moon night. Shortly before his eighteenth birthday, the mysterious man suddenly disappears from his dreams. Later, while interning at a company, Salin meets its chief executive officer, Sun, and realizes he is the very same man who had appeared in his dreams.

== Cast ==
=== Main ===
- Panuwat Sopradit (Mos) as Sun Suriyen
- Mondop Heamtan (Bank) as Salin

=== Supporting ===
- Bovorn Kongnawdee (Fong) as Chan
- Rathasat Butwong (JJ) as Juldis
- Anda Anunta Teavirat as Prim Primlada
- Lookkaew Kamollak Sangsubsin as Pim Phiphatthanakul
- Tenon Teachapat Pinrat as Sam Tinnakorn
- Pete Wacharanon Seeduan as Yotha
- Koy Naruemon Phongsupap as Sasi, Salin's mother

=== Guest ===
- Waiyakorn Wongkhakaew (Newton) as Pim's boyfriend (episode 8)
- Attila Arthur Gagnaux as a model (episode 12)
- Rina Wacharin Anantapong as Madam Wang
- Atom Aphichaya Kamnoetsirikun (episode 12; uncredited)

=== Others ===
- Mersedes Siripath Sarakune as Ally
- Job Krisz Ahandrik as Chris
- Jumneansri Janejira as Sitharinthewi
- Naamon Patcharawalai Pongpamon as Sasikanthewi
- Tonaoy Pintira Singhaseem as Ammaraphon
- Pooh Poohrin Pattanawiriyawanich as Phayasattaban

== Soundtrack ==
Title	Artist	Length
"Pink Sea"	Bank Mondop Heamtan	3:55

== Awards and nominations ==
Year	Award	Category	Result
2025	Thailand Y Content Awards 2024	Best Art Direction	Nominated
2025	Thailand Y Content Awards 2024	Best Special Effects	Nominated
