= Maya Channel Magazine =

Thai gossip magazine owned by Maya Channel 2002 Co., Ltd.

- Categories: Gossip
- Frequency: Biweekly
- Publisher: Maya Channel 2002 Co., Ltd.
- Country: Thailand
- Based in: Bangkok
- Language: Thai
- Website: www.maya-channel.com
- ISSN: 1906-7453

Maya Channel Magazine is a Thai biweekly gossip magazine owned by Maya Channel 2002 Co., Ltd.

The magazine also presents an annual entertainment award called Maya Awards.
