= Amarin TV =

Thai television network

- Country: Thailand
- Broadcast area: Southeast Asia
- Headquarters: 7/9 - 18 Arun Amarin Road, Bangkok Noi, Bangkok, Thailand

Programming
- Language: Thai
- Picture format: 1080i (16:9 HDTV)

Ownership
- Owner: Amarin Television Co., Ltd.

History
- Launched: Satellite system: 1 December 2012; 13 years ago Terrestrial digital: 25 May 2014; 11 years ago Satellite and digital: 2 December 2015; 10 years ago
- Former names: Amarin Activ TV (2013)

Links
- Website: www.amarintv.com

Availability

Terrestrial
- Digital terrestrial television: Channel 34 (HD)

Amarin TV, fully known as Amarin TV 34 HD (Thai: อมรินทร์ทีวี เอชดี ช่อง 34), is a Thai digital terrestrial television channel operated by Amarin Television Co., Ltd., a subsidiary of Amarin Corporation PCL, which is an affiliate of the TCC Group. The channel offers a variety of content such as news, entertainment, lifestyle, food and variety programs. It was also one of the broadcasting companies that was granted a license to operate on digital television by the National Broadcasting and Telecommunications Commission in December 2013.

Officially launched on 12 December 2012, the channel initially carried the name of "Amarin Activ TV" on 1 January 2013 but ceased operations on 31 January 2014. It was later relaunched under its current name on 25 May 2014.

== Programming ==
=== Amarin News ===
News Program	Announcer
Khao Arun Amarin Tuar Thai (ข่าวอรุณอมรินทร์ ทั่วไทย); Mon. - Fri. 5:30 - 6:30 a.m. Sat. - Sun. 6:00 - 7:00 a.m. Khao Arun Amarin (ข่าวอรุณอมรินทร์); Mon. - Fri. 6:30 - 8:45 a.m. Khao Arun Amarin Sudsapda (ข่าวอรุณอมรินทร์ สุดสัปดาห์); Sat. - Sun. 7:00 - 9:00 a.m	Rangsima S. (รังสิมา ศฤงคารนฤมิตร); Sathapat P. (สถาปัตย์ แพทอง); Supachoke O. (ศุภโชค โอภาสะคุณ); Chompoonuch Na P. (ชมพูนุช ณ พัทลุง); Kanokporn M. (กนกภรณ์ มรรคผลสมบัติ)
Sport Lifestyle 34 (สปอร์ตไลฟ์สไตล์ 34); Mon. - Fri. 8.45 - 9.05 a.m.	Nantakwang S. (นันทขว้าง สิรสุนทร); Phakjira J. (ภัคจิรา จิระวัฒนะภัณฑ์)
Khao Tiang Amarin (ข่าวเที่ยงอมรินทร์); Mon. - Fri. 11:00 a.m. - 1:30 p.m. Sat. - Sun. 11:00 a.m. - 12:00 p.m.	Areerat S. (อารีรัตน์ สุขรุ่งเรือง); Nopjarot J. (นภจรส ใจเกษม); Patiphan Y. (ปฏิภาณ ยุวนะวณิช); Watsamon C. (วรรษมน ช่างปรีชา); Natchaya S. (ณัฐชยา สงวนสุข)
APOP Bunterng (เอป็อป บันเทิง); Mon. - Fri. 1:30 - 2:00 p.m.	Maspreeya S. (มาศปรียา สุวรรณธารารัตน์); Nutchapol R. (ณัชพล รัตนมงคล); Sajee K. (ศจี คันธยศ); Saranrak S. (ศรัณรักษ์ สุขศรี); Laksika P. (ลักษิกา ประชาสมบูรณ์)
Khao Yen Amarin (ข่าวเย็นอมรินทร์); Mon. - Fri. 3:50 - 5:00 p.m.	Patiphan Y. (ปฏิภาณ ยุวนะวณิช); Watsamon C. (วรรษมน ช่างปรีชา)
Tub Toh Khao (ทุบโต๊ะข่าว); Mon. - Fri. (Part 1); 6:50 - 8:00 p.m. (Part 2); 8:15 - 10:00 p.m. Sat. - Sun. (Part 1); 7:00 - 8:00 p.m. (Part 2); 8:15 - 9:30 p.m.	Nopjarot J. (นภจรส ใจเกษม); Thanannapat N. (ธนญญ์นภสสร์ น้อยเวียง) Kamonphorn W. (กมลพร วรกุล); Ekkalak S. (เอกลักษณ์ ศรีสุขใส)
Tub Toh Khao X'clusive (ทุบโต๊ะข่าว X'clusive); Mon. - Fri. 10:00 - 10:30 p.m.	Thanannapat N. (ธนญญ์นภสสร์ น้อยเวียง); Ekkalak S. (เอกลักษณ์ ศรีสุขใส)

=== Thai Drama ===
{{List of dramas on Amarin TV}}

- Samee See Thong (THE HUSBANDS สามีสีทอง) (2019)
- Rong Tao Naree (รองเท้านารี) (2019 - 2020)
- Talay Prae 2020 (ทะเลแปร) (2020)
- Plerng Nang (2020) (เพลิงนาง) (2020)
- Bangkert Klao (บังเกิดเกล้า) (2020 - 2021)
- Tawan Tok Din (ตะวันตกดิน) (2021)
- Pleng Bin Bai Ngiew (เพลงบินใบงิ้ว) (2022)
- Samee Ngern Phon (สามีเงินผ่อน) (2022)
- Fah Tan Tawan (ฟ้า/ทาน/ตะวัน) (2022)
- Fai Luang (ไฟลวง) (2023)
- Wongsakanayat (วงศาคณาญาติ) (2023)
- Songkram Ngern (สงครามเงิน) (2023)

=== Thai Series ===
- Love Stage!! (2022) (เลิฟสเตจ)
- What Zabb Man! (2022) (What Zabb Man! รักวุ่นวาย นายรสแซ่บ)
- Check Out (2022) (Check Out คืนนั้นกับนายดาวเหนือ)
- Remember Me (2022) (Remember Me ความรักเขียนด้วยความรัก)
- Hit Bite Love (2023) (Hit Bite Love รักชอบเจ็บ)
- The Yearbook (2021) (หนังสือรุ่น)
- Love Syndrome III (2023) (รักโคตร ๆ โหดอย่างมึง 3)
- Manner of Death (2020) (พฤติการณ์ที่ตาย)

=== Notable sports ===
- Muay Thai Kiatphet Or Tor Kor 3 On Or Tor Kor 3 Nonthaburi (past), Rajadamnern Stadium (past), World Siam Stadium (present) (“อมรินทร์ซูเปอร์ไฟต์ ศึกช้างมวยไทยเกียรติเพชร”) Every Saturday from 4:00 PM to 8:00 PM, January 7, 2023-present (Sunday from 5:00 PM to 7:00 PM, January 20, 2018-January 1, 2023) (Originally broadcast on the channel T-Sports Channel (2 February - 28 September 2014), Channel Bright TV 20 (2 January - 8 October 2016), Channel NOW26 (1 November 2015 - 24 June 2018), Nation TV 22 (1 July 2018 - 13 January 2019))
- The Champion Muay Thai ตัดเชือก Every Saturday from 6:00 PM to 8:00 PM (2019-2020)
- Muay Thai Rajadamnern (“ศึกมวยไทยมรดกคนไทย : ราชดำเนินซุปเปอร์ไฟต์”) On Rajadamnern Stadium Every Friday from 5:00 PM to 7:00 PM Parallel to Online Facebook:GSV ศึกมวยไทยมรดกคนไทย, November 26, 2021 – present (Originally broadcast on the channel PPVHD36 every sunday from 6:00 PM to 8:00 PM (November 9, 2014 - January 29, 2017), 3SD28 every thursday from 8:30 PM to 10:30 PM (June 7, 2018 - June 13, 2019))

== Presenters ==
=== Current ===
- Thanannapat Noiwiang
- Kamonphorn Worrakul
- Rangsima Sarungkarnnarumit
- Sathapat Paethong
- Supachok Supasakun
- Nantakwang Sirasoontorn
- Phakjira Jirawattanaphan
- Nopjarot Jaikasem
- Arirat Sukrungreung–ŠBig text
- Watsamon Changpreecha
- Natchaya Sanguansuk
- Angkanang Maimongkol (Spotlight)
- Maspreeya Suwantararat
- Natchaphol Rattanamongkol
- Saranyu Prachakrit
- Patiphan Yuwanawanich
- Chompoonuch Na Phatthalung
- Ekkalak Srisuksai
- Nutchapol Rattanamongkol
- Sajee Khantayot
- Saranrak Suksri
- Laksika Prachasomboon
- Kanokporn Markpolsombat

=== Former ===
- Piyaluck Rakpratanporn
- Chart Pattanakulkarnkit
- Sarunpat Tangphaisarntanakul (now at ONE31)
- Jitdee Sridee (now at Channel 8)
- Jade Prasertrungreung
- Praiwan Wannabut
- Ruengrit McIntosh
- Wit Sittivaekin
- Jindarat Charoenchaichana
- Thikamporn Ritthaapinan
- Ratchanok Suwannakej

== See also ==
- Announcements and broadcasters on Amarin TV channel
- List of TV dramas on Amarin TV channel
